= The Brave-Tuber =

Japanese manga series

- Cover of The Brave-Tuber volume 1 by Mag Garden

配信勇者 (Haishin Yūsha)
- Genre: Comedy, sword and sorcery
- Manga
- Written by: Takahito Oosaki
- Illustrated by: Ikuro
- Published by: Mag Garden
- English publisher: NA: Seven Seas Entertainment
- Magazine: Monthly Comic Garden; Mag Comi
- Original run: February 2018 – March 2019
- Volumes: 2
- Original net animation
- Directed by: Kazuya Fujishiro
- Studio: acca effe; Giga Production
- Released: December 27, 2019 – January 17, 2020
- Episodes: 12

The Brave-Tuber (配信勇者, Haishin Yūsha) is a Japanese manga series written by Takahito Oosaki and illustrated by Ikuro. It was serialized in Mag Garden's shōnen manga magazine Monthly Comic Garden, as well as the website Mag Comi, between February 2018 and March 2019 and was collected in two tankōbon volumes. The manga is licensed in North America by Seven Seas Entertainment. An original net animation adaptation by acca effe and Giga Production was streamed on the &CAST!!! and Production I.G's Anime Beans app between December 27, 2019, and January 17, 2020, for 12 episodes.
