= Seven Seas Entertainment =

American publishing company

- Parent company: Media Do International
- Founded: 2004; 22 years ago
- Founder: Jason DeAngelis
- Country of origin: United States
- Headquarters location: Los Angeles, California
- Distribution: Penguin Random House Publisher Services
- Publication types: Manga, graphic novels, OEL manga, light novels, danmei
- Imprints: Ghost Ship; Airship; Steamship
- Official website: sevenseasentertainment.com

Seven Seas Entertainment is an American publishing company located in Los Angeles, California. It was originally dedicated to the publication of original English-language manga, but now publishes licensed manga and light novels from Japan, as well as select webcomics. The company is headed by Jason DeAngelis, who coined the term "world manga" with the October 2004 launch of the company's website.

== History ==
In April 2005, Seven Seas became the first manga publisher to release downloadable manga content for the PlayStation Portable and, as a result, gained over 12,000 downloads in the first five days. Seven Seas followed the PlayStation Portable announcement with enlisting the platinum-selling Filipino group the J Brothers to create a theme song for its web OEL manga series Aoi House entitled "Itsumo Futaride". During Comic-Con 2005, Seven Seas Entertainment premiered the pilot of its No Man's Land flash anime series and later followed it with a flash animation music video based on Aoi House.

In October 2005, it announced plans for its first Japanese license for novels and manga from the Boogiepop series by Kouhei Kadono and Kouji Ogata.

In September 2006, Seven Seas announced a project to translate and publish Japanese light novels, including popular titles such as Strawberry Panic!.

In March 2008, Seven Seas Entertainment began publishing new editions of Rachel Robert's popular children's fantasy novel series Avalon: Web of Magic in conjunction with Red Sky Entertainment. A three-volume manga spin-off titled Avalon: The Warlock Diaries followed which started in June 2009. Seven Seas and Red Sky Entertainment also launched a dedicated website for the Avalon novel series in September 2008 at AvalonMagic.com.

On August 1, 2012, Seven Seas Entertainment launched the ad-supported free webcomic portal Zoom Comics in partnership with Pixie Trix Comix. The initial launch titles included Amazing Agent Jennifer, Dracula Everlasting, Paranormal Mystery Squad, and Vampire Cheerleaders.

On January 20, 2017, Seven Seas Entertainment announced that it had partnered up with online light novel publisher J-Novel Club to release their licensed properties in print.

On October 11, 2017, Seven Seas Entertainment announced a new manga imprint called Ghost Ship for its mature titles. Manga series licensed under this imprint are distributed through Diamond Book Distributors.

On October 5, 2018, Seven Seas Entertainment won the Harvey Award for Best Manga for its English version of My Lesbian Experience With Loneliness.

On November 13, 2020, Seven Seas Entertainment announced a new imprint called "Airship" for its light novel and Japanese prose novel licenses.

On November 20, 2020, Seven Seas Entertainment announced that it would be switching distributors worldwide, with all imprints moving to Penguin Random House Publisher Services from July 1, 2021.

On December 21, 2020, Seven Seas Entertainment announced that they would publish Hiveworks webcomics in print.

In early 2021, it was found that Seven Seas Entertainment had been making alteration to their English translations of certain light novels.

On August 4, 2021, Seven Seas Entertainment began licensing Danmei novels from China, beginning with The Scum Villain's Self-Saving System, Grandmaster of Demonic Cultivation, and Heaven Official's Blessing, all written by Mo Xiang Tong Xiu.

On January 5, 2022, Seven Seas Entertainment began releasing Korean webtoons in print, beginning with PULSE, Love is an Illusion!, and Killing Stalking all published on the Lezhin Comics web platform.

On January 26, 2022, Seven Seas Entertainment announced a new imprint called "Steamship" for its shōjo, josei and teens' love romance manga titles, beginning with GAME: Between the Suits, I'll Never be Your Crown Princess!, Ladies on Top, and Outbride: Beauty and the Beasts.

On May 23, 2022, employees of Seven Seas announced the formation of "United Workers of the Seven Seas", a union working with Communications Workers of America. On May 29, 2022, Seven Seas management announced that it would not voluntarily recognize the union and has requested an election with the NLRB.

On May 25, 2022, Seven Seas Entertainment began licensing manhuas from China, beginning with the manhua adaptation of Mo Xiang Tong Xiu's Grandmaster of Demonic Cultivation.

On May 31, 2022, it was revealed that Seven Seas had hired the law firm of Ogletree, Deakins, Nash, Smoak & Stewart to represent them in their NLRB case with their employees. In response the United Workers of the Seven Seas tweeted out that Seven Seas had hired "the union-busting firm Ogletree Deakins" to counter their union efforts.

On June 24, 2022, the United Workers of the Seven Seas announced that Seven Seas had agreed to voluntarily recognize the union after a majority card check.

On May 30, 2023, Seven Seas Entertainment announced that they would begin publishing audiobooks under the new "Siren" imprint in the following month.

Seven Seas Entertainment was acquired by Media Do International, a California-based subsidiary of the Japanese corporation Media Do Holdings, for US$80 million on March 1, 2026.

=== Controversies ===
In early 2021, it was found that Seven Seas Entertainment had been making alterations to their English translations of certain light novels. This resulted in multiple lines or paragraphs being altered for the English release. Some of the titles affected were Classroom of the Elite, I'm in Love with the Villainess, and Mushoku Tensei: Jobless Reincarnation. Altered sections were made without consulting the original authors and involved controversial issues including sexual assault and homophobia. In the case of Mushoku Tensei: Jobless Reincarnation this involved plot points being rewritten, while in I'm in Love with the Villainess it involved omitting text.

After receiving criticism, Seven Seas Entertainment announced that they would be revising these changes, republishing the affected volumes, and making changes to their editing process to "make sure important lines are not lost".

In May 2022, Seven Seas Entertainment released the first volume of I Think I Turned My Childhood Friend into a Girl. Their localization of this was criticized for portraying Hiura – a feminine male character in the original – as a trans woman and removing the intent of it being a boys love story; Seven Seas Entertainment responded by revising this for future volumes and for reprints of volume 1.

== Age ratings ==
Seven Seas currently has six different age ratings for their titles (they previously had a single unified "Older Teens" rating for ages 16 and older, but that was changed to have separate "Older Teen (15+)" and "Older Teen (17+)" ratings to better indicate the intensity and frequency of the different types of content):

Seven Seas Entertainment Age Ratings
Rating	Description
All ages	Appropriate for readers of any age. No swearing or suggestive themes/sexual content. May include mild fantasy action/violence.
Ages 10+	Intended for readers aged 10 years and older. No swearing. May include mild action/comedic violence, mildly crude humor, or mild tobacco/alcohol use.
Teen (13+)	Intended for readers aged 13 years and older. May include mild swearing, mild suggestive themes, moderate violence, and/or tobacco, alcohol, or other substance use.
Older Teen (15+)	Intended for readers aged 15 years and older. May include moderate swearing, mild suggestive themes/sexual content, partial nudity, violence, and/or tobacco, alcohol, or other substance use.
Older Teen (17+)	Intended for readers aged 17 years and older. May include frequent swearing, intense violence, nudity, sexual content, and/or tobacco, alcohol, or other substance use.
Mature	Intended for readers aged 18 years and older. May include intense language, nudity, sexual content, extreme violence, and/or other mature themes.

== Titles ==
=== Original series ===
- Amazing Agent Jennifer
- Amazing Agent Luna
- Aoi House
- Arkham Woods
- Avalon: The Warlock Diaries
- Avalon: Web of Magic
- Blade for Barter
- Captain Nemo
- Coral's Reef
- Dead Already
- Destiny's Hand
- Dracula Everlasting
- Dungeon Crawlers Academy
- Free Runners
- Hollow Fields
- InVisible
- It Takes a Wizard
- Laddertop
- Last Hope
- Mr. Grieves
- My Little Pony: The Manga
- No Man's Land
- Paranormal Mystery Squad
- Ravenskull
- Ringworld
- ROADQUEEN: Eternal Roadtrip to Love
- Ten Beautiful Assassins
- The Outcast (2007)
- Unearthly
- Vampire Cheerleaders

==== Hiveworks ====
- Amongst Us
- Awaken
- Life of Melody
- Never Satisfied
- Persephone: Hades' Torment
- Sleepless Domain
- Tiger, Tiger

=== Seven Seas Entertainment (manga) ===
- 10 Things I Want to Do Before I Turn 40
- 100 Ghost Stories That Will Lead to My Own Death
- 12 Beast
- 365 Days to the Wedding
- 5 Seconds Before a Witch Falls in Love
- 7th Time Loop: The Villainess Enjoys a Carefree Life Married to Her Worst Enemy!
- A Cat from Our World and the Forgotten Witch
- A Centaur's Life
- A Certain Scientific Accelerator
- A Certain Scientific Railgun
- A Certain Scientific Railgun: Astral Buddy
- A Chinese Fantasy
- A Couple Drifting in the Wind
- A Life Turned Upside Down: My Dad's an Alcoholic
- A Love Yet to Bloom
- A Ninja and an Assassin Under One Roof
- A Paradise Reached Through Love
- A Prince of a Friend
- A Quirky Girl Is Inviting Me to Bed
- A Reincarnated Carrier's Strategy for Another World
- A Story of Seven Lives
- A Tale of the Secret Saint
- A White Rose in Bloom
- A Yuri Love Story That Begins with Getting Dumped in a Dream
- Absolute Duo
- Accomplishments of the Duke's Daughter
- After School Etude
- Afterglow
- Aharen Is Indecipherable
- Akashic Records of Bastard Magic Instructor
- Akuma no Riddle: Riddle Story of Devil
- Al the Adventurer: That Magic Shouldn't Work!
- Alice & Zoroku
- Alice in the Country of Hearts
  - Alice in the Country of Clover
  - Alice in the Country of Joker
- Alice Love Fables
- Alice, All the Way to Outer Space
- Amamiya-san is the Cutest…and I'm a Close Second!
- Amnesia Labyrinth
- An Ordinary Guy's Crazy Modern Dungeon Survival!
- And They Were Roommates...!
- Angel Para Bellum
- Anti-Magic Academy: The 35th Test Platoon
- Anti-Romance
- Anyhow, the Rabbit Is Infatuated with the Puppy
- Are You a Landmine, Chihara-san?
- Arifureta: From Commonplace to World's Strongest
  - Arifureta: From Commonplace to World's Strongest Zero
  - Arifureta: I Heart Isekai
- Arpeggio of Blue Steel
- As Fish to Water: Where the Forest Meets the Sea
- Asumi-chan Is Interested in Lesbian Brothels
- At 25:00, in Akasaka
- Backstabbed in a Backwater Dungeon: My Party Tried to Kill Me, But Thanks to an Infinite Gacha I Got LVL 9999 Friends and Am Out for Revenge
- Barbarities
- Battle Rabbits
- Beasts of Abigaile
- Beautiful Things
- Beauty and the Beast Girl
- Become You
- Berserk of Gluttony
- Betrothed to My Sister's Ex
- Bite Maker: The King's Omega
- BL First Crush Anthology: Five Seconds Before We Fall in Love
- BL Game Rebirth: My New Life as the Hero's Younger Brother
- BL Metamorphosis
- Black and White: Tough Love at the Office
- Black Blood
- Black Night Parade
- Blank Canvas: My So-Called Artist's Journey
- Blood Alone
- Blood Night Market
- Bloom Into You
  - Bloom Into You Anthology
- Blue Giant
- Bodacious Space Pirates: Abyss of Hyperspace
- Boogiepop Doesn't Laugh
- Box of Light
- Boy Meets Maria
- Breakfast with My Two-Tailed Cat
- Call To Adventure! Defeating Dungeons with a Skill Board
- Can You Kiss Me First?
- Candy and Cigarettes
- Captain Harlock: Dimensional Voyage
- Captive Hearts of Oz
- Cat Companions Maruru and Hachi
- Cat Man
- Cat Massage Therapy
- Cat on the Hero's Lap
- Catnaps, Catnaps, Everywhere!
- Cats and Sugar Bowls
- Cats With Jobs
- Chainsmoker Cat
- Chasing Spica
- Cheeky Devil Cop!
- Chii's Winged Life
- Chillin' in Another World with Level 2 Super Cheat Powers
- Choking on Love
- Chronicles of an Aristocrat Reborn in Another World
- Cinderella Closet
- Citrus
  - Citrus+
- Classmates
- Classroom of the Elite
  - Classroom of the Elite: Horikita
- Claudine
- Clay Lord: Master of Golems
- Colorless
- Concrete Revolutio
- Contrast
- Correspondence from the End of the Universe
- Cosmo Familia
- Creepy Cat
- Crimson Empire
- Crisis Girls
- Crossplay Love: Otaku x Punk
- Crow Hill: Don't Be Shy!!
- Cube Arts
- Cupid Is Struck by Lightning
- Cutie and the Beast
- Cutie Honey
- Cutie Honey a Go Go!
- D-Frag!
- Dai Dark
- Daily Report About My Witch Senpai
- Dance in the Vampire Bund
  - Dance in the Vampire Bund II: Scarlet Order
  - Dance in the Vampire Bund: Age of Scarlet Order
  - Dance in the Vampire Bund: Forgotten Tales
  - Dance in the Vampire Bund: The Memories of Sledgehammer
  - Dive in the Vampire Bund
- Days of Love at Seagull Villa
- Deadline Summoner
- Dear Sister, I've Become a Blessed Maiden
- Delinquent Daddy and Tender Teacher
- Demon Under the Waxing Moon
- Devilman
- Devilman Grimoire
- Devilman VS. Hades
- Devils and Realist
- Diary of a Female Lead: Shujinkou Nikki
- Dictatorial Grimoire
- Didn't I Say to Make My Abilities Average in the Next Life?!
- Didn't I Say to Make My Abilities Average in the Next Life?! Everyday Misadventures!
- Dinosaurs Sanctuary
- Dirty Pair
- DNA Doesn't Tell Us
- Does It Count If You Lose Your Virginity to an Android?
- Dogs of Tosca
- Don't Call it Mystery
- Don't Meddle With My Daughter
- Doughnuts Under a Crescent Moon
- Dragon Goes House-Hunting
- Dragon Half
- Dragon Quest Monsters+
- Dragonar Academy
- Draw This, Then Die!
- Dreamin' Sun
- Drugstore in Another World: The Slow Life of a Cheat Pharmacist
- Dungeon Builder: The Demon King's Labyrinth Is a Modern City!
- Dungeon Dive: Aim for the Deepest Level
- Dungeon Elf: What's a Dungeon without Treasure Chests?
- Dungeon Friends Forever
- Dungeon People
- Dungeon Toilet
- Dysfunctional Family Theory
- Easygoing Territory Defense by the Optimistic Lord: Production Magic Turns a Nameless Village into the Strongest Fortified City
- EAT
- Entangled with You: The Garden of 100 Grasses
- Even Dogs Go to Other Worlds: Life in Another World with My Beloved Hound
- Even Though We're Adults
- Evergreen
- Everything for Demon King Evelogia
- Ex-Yakuza and Stray Kitten
- Exotic Animal Doctor
- Failed Princesses
- Failure Frame: I Became the Strongest and Annihilated Everything with Low-Level Spells
- Fairy Cat
- Fairy Tale Battle Royale
- Fake Fact Lips
  - Fake Fact Lips Break
- Family, Now and Forever
- Far From Romance
- Fate/Kaleid Liner Prisma Illya
- First Love Sisters
- Follow That Kiss
- Fragtime
- Franken Fran
- Free Life Fantasy Online: Immortal Princess
- Freezing
- Futari Escape
- Gakuen Polizi
- Gal Gohan
- Gap Papa: Daddy at Work and at Home
- Gene Bride
- Generation Witch
- Get Married So I Can Curse Your Firstborn and Finally Be Free!
- Getter Robo Devolution
- Ghost & Witch
- Ghost Diary
- Ghostly Things
- Giant Spider & Me: A Post-Apocalyptic Tale
- Gigant
- Gilded Seven
- Girl Friends
- Girl Meets Rock!
- Girls und Panzer
  - Girls und Panzer: Little Army
- Give Me a Hug, Mr. Frog!
- Glasses with a Chance of Delinquent
- Go for It, Nakamura!
  - Go for It Again, Nakamura!
- God of Seduction in the Bedroom
- Gold Kingdom and Water Kingdom
- Golden Time
- Good Morning, Good Night, and See You Tomorrow
- Good Night, My Little Bird
- Goodbye, My Rose Garden
- Grand Metal Organs
- Gravitation
- Great Pretender
- Grim Night Tales
- Gunslinger Girl
- Haganai
- Hana & Hina After School
- Hanaori-san Still Wants to Fight in the Next Life
- Handsome Girl and Sheltered Girl
- Happy Kanako's Killer Life
- Harukana Receive
- Hate Me, but Let Me Stay
  - Hate Me, but Let Me Stay - Manager and Otoha
  - Hate Me, but Let Me Stay - Mr. Asanaga and Mr. Yanagi
- Hatsukoi Note
- Hatsune Miku Presents: Hachune Miku's Everyday Vocaloid Paradise!
  - Hatsune Miku: Bad∞End∞Night
  - Hatsune Miku: Cantarella ~Poison of Blue~
- Haven't You Heard? I'm Sakamoto
- Hayate × Blade
- He Craves to be Teased by His Favorite ASMR Streamer
- He Is My Master
- Headhunted to Another World: From Salaryman to Big Four!
- Hello World
- Hello, Melancholic!
- Heroine? Saint? No, I'm an All-Works Maid (and Proud of It)!
- Hibana
- High-Rise Invasion
- Hikari-Man
- Himegasaki Sakurako Is a Hot Mess
- Himitsu Sentai Gorenger
- Himouto! Umaru-chan
- His Little Amber
- His Majesty the Demon King's Housekeeper
- History of the Kingdom of the Orcsen: How the Barbarian Orcish Nation Came to Burn Down the Peaceful Elfland
- Hitomi-chan is Shy With Strangers
- Hokkaido Gals Are Super Adorable!
- Holy Corpse Rising
- Home Sweet Home
- Homunculus
- HOOL!GAN'S
- Hope You're Happy, Lemon
- The Horizon Will Soon Shine
- Hotel Inhumans
- Hoteri Hotette First Kiss
- Hour of the Zombie
- How Do I Turn My Best Friend Into My Girlfriend?
- How Heavy Are the Dumbbells You Lift?
- How Many Light-Years to Babylon?
- How My Daddies Became Mates
- How Not to Summon a Demon Lord
- How to Repair a Broken Cup
- How to Train Your Devil
- How to Treat Magical Beasts: Mine and Master's Medical Journal
- Hungry for You: Endo Yasuko Stalks the Night
- Hunting in Another World with My Elf Wife
- I Abandoned My Engagement Because My Sister Is a Tragic Heroine, but Somehow I Became Entangled with a Righteous Prince
- I Am a Cat Barista
- I Am Alice: Body Swap in Wonderland
- I Became a Necromancer After Beating Up My Angel Guide and Accidentally Triggered the Apocalypse
- I Can't Believe I Slept With You!
- I Can't Stand Being Your Childhood Friend
- I Didn't Mean to Fall in Love
  - I Didn't Mean to Fall in Love -double-
- I Don't Like You at All, Big Brother!!
- I Get the Feeling That Nobukuni-san Likes Me
- I Got Caught Up in a Hero Summons, but the Other World Was at Peace!
- I Got Married to the Girl I Hate Most in Class
- I Got Fired as a Court Wizard so Now I'm Moving to the Country to Become a Magic Teacher
- I Had That Same Dream Again
- I Like Cat Butts
- I Married My Best Friend To Shut My Parents Up
- I Married My Female Friend
- I Quit My Apprenticeship as a Royal Court Wizard to Become a Magic Item Craftswoman
- I Reincarnated as the "Villain" Commander of an Order of Knights
- I Say
- I See You, Aizawa-san!
- I Swear I Won't Bother You Again!
- I Think I Turned My Childhood Friend into a Girl
- I Used to Think My Childhood Friend Was a Guy—Now We’re Newlyweds, and She’s the Perfect Bride!
- I Want to Eat Your Pancreas
- I Will Fall in Love with Azami Yako (if it kills me)
- I Wish I Could Meet You Again on the Hill Where That Flower Blooms
- I Won't Let Mistress Suck My Blood
- I, Otaku: Struggle in Akihabara
- I'll Forget You Starting Today, Senpai!
- I'm a Terminal Cancer Patient, but I'm Fine
- I'm a Wolf, but My Boss is a Sheep!
- I'm in Love with the Older Girl Next Door
- I'm in Love with the Villainess
- I'm Kinda Chubby and I'm Your Hero
- I'm Running for Crown Princess, but All I Want is a Steady Paycheck!
- I'm the Evil Lord of an Intergalactic Empire!
  - I'm the Heroic Knight of an Intergalactic Empire!
- Ichi the Killer
- IDOL × IDOL STORY!
- If It's for My Daughter, I'd Even Defeat a Demon Lord
- Imaginary
- In This Corner of the World
- Influencer Hero: After Saving Another World, I Got Rich Streaming Dungeons!
- Inukami!
- It Takes More Than a Pretty Face to Fall in Love
- It's a Secret, Shirotae-sama
- Jack the Ripper: Hell Blade
- Juana and the Dragonewt's Seven Kingdoms
- Kageki Shojo!! The Curtain Rises
- Kageki Shojo!!
- Kaiju Kamui
- Kamen Rider
- Kanokon
- Karate Survivor in Another World
- Kase-san
  - Kase-san and Yamada
- Kashimashi: Girl Meets Girl
- Kaya-chan Isn't Scary
- Kemono Jihen
- Kidnapped by Elves, I Went from Potion Factory Alchemist to Accidental Hero
- Killer Shark in Another World
- Killing Me / Killing You
- Kindred Spirits on the Roof
- Kingdom of Z
- Kiruru Kill Me
- Kisses, Sighs, and Cherry Blossom Pink
- Kitayama and Minamiya
  - Kitayama and Minamiya: Our First Year of Dating
- Kokoro Connect
- Koharu and Minato: Happy Life with My Girlfriend
- Kuma Kuma Kuma Bear
- Land of the Rising Dead
- Last Game
- Lazy Dungeon Master
- Lazy Girl Momogusa
- Leave the Sacrifice at the Gate
- Les Misérables
- Let Me See the Real You, Senpai!
- Let's Buy the Land and Cultivate It in a Different World
- Let's Run an Inn on Dungeon Island! (In a World Ruled by Women)
- Level 1 Demon Lord and One Room Hero
- Life with an Ordinary Guy Who Reincarnated into a Total Fantasy Knockout
- Lion Hearts
- Little Devils
- Living with My Old Cat
- Lizzie Newton: Victorian Mysteries
- Lonely Castle in the Mirror
- Long Period
- The Lord Magear's Apprentice
- Lord Marksman and Vanadis
- Love in Hell
  - Love in Hell: Death Life
- Love Is Money
- Love Me for Who I Am
- Love on the Other Side – A Nagabe Short Story Collection
- Love Tattoo
- Love, a Kitten, and a Salty Dog
- Lovers on the Last Train
- Lucifer and the Biscuit Hammer
- Luna Knight
- Lupin III (Lupin the 3rd): Greatest Heists
  - Lupin III (Lupin the 3rd): Thick as Thieves
- Machimaho: I Messed Up and Made the Wrong Person Into a Magical Girl!
- Made in Abyss
  - Made in Abyss Official Anthology
- Magaimono: Super Magic Action Entertainment
- Magia the Ninth
- Magic Artisan Dahlia Wilts No More
- Magic Maker: How to Create Magic in Another World
- Magic Repo Man: Dumped by My Party, I'll Cash in with a Cute Support Fairy to Become the Strongest!
- Magical Angel Creamy Mami and the Spoiled Princess
- Magical Buffs: The Support Caster Is Stronger Than He Realized!
- Magical Girl Apocalypse
  - Magical Girl Site
- Magical Girl Spec-Ops Asuka
- Magika Swordsman and Summoner
- Makeup Is Not (Just) Magic: A Manga Guide to Cosmetics and Skin Care
- Malevolent Spirits: Mononogatari
- MaMaMa: Magical Director Mako-chan's Magical Guidance
- Manly Appetites: Minegishi Loves Otsu
- Marmalade Boy
- Marriage to Kitsune-sama
- Mars Red
- Masamune-kun's Revenge
- Mayo Chiki!
- Me and the Prez, Drinking Under the Stars
- Merman in My Tub
- Mii-chan and Yamada-san
- Mii-chan Wants to Be Kept
- Miss Kobayashi's Dragon Maid
  - Miss Kobayashi's Dragon Maid: Elma's Office Lady Diary
  - Miss Kobayashi's Dragon Maid: Fafnir the Recluse
  - Miss Kobayashi's Dragon Maid: Kanna's Daily Life
  - Miss Kobayashi's Dragon Maid: Ilulu Doesn't Understand Love
- Mistress Kanan Is Devilishly Easy
- Mocha the Cat & His Forever Family
- Modern Dungeon Capture Starting with Broken Skills
- MoMo: The Blood Taker
- Monologue Woven for You
- Mononoke Sharing
- Monotone Blue
- Monster Cats
- Monster Girl Encyclopedia
- Monster Guild: The Dark Lord's (No-Good) Comeback!
- Monster Musume
  - Monster Musume: I Heart Monster Girls
- Moonlight Meow
- Mouse Royale
- Muscles are Better Than Magic!
- Mushoku Tensei: Jobless Reincarnation
  - Mushoku Tensei: Roxy Gets Serious
- Mushroom Girls in Love
- My [Repair] Skill Became a Versatile Cheat, So I Think I'll Open a Weapon Shop
- My Androgynous Boyfriend
- My Boyfriend Is a Dog
- My Boyfriend Is a Vampire
- My Brain Is Different: Stories of ADHD and Other Developmental Disorders
- My Cat Is Such a Weirdo
- My Cute Cousin Always Gets Her Way
- My Cute Little Kitten
- My Darling Devilish Daughter
- My Dear Detective: Mitsuko's Case Files
- My Deer Friend Nokotan
- My Dog Is a Death God
- My Father Is a Unicorn
- My Girlfriend Cheated on Me, and Now My Flirty Underclassman Won't Leave Me Alone!
- My Girlfriend Is 8 Meters Tall
- My Girlfriend Is a T-Rex
- My Girlfriend's Child
- My Girlfriend's Not Here Today
- My Goddess Is Precious Today, Too
- My House Cat Became the World's Strongest?!
- My Kitten Is a Picky Eater
- My Lesbian Experience with Loneliness
  - My Alcoholic Escape from Reality
  - My Pancreas Broke, But My Life Got Better
  - My Solo Exchange Diary
  - My Wandering Warrior Eating Disorder
  - My Wandering Warrior Existence
- My Lovey-Dovey Wife Is a Stone Cold Killer
- My Monster Secret
- My Name Is Mienne: Tales of a Blind Kitten
- My New Boss Is Goofy
- My New Life as a Cat
- My Next Life as a Villainess: All Routes Lead to Doom!
  - My Next Life as a Villainess Side Story: Girls Patch
  - My Next Life as a Villainess Side Story: On the Verge of Doom!
- My Pathetic Vampire Life
- My Room Is a Dungeon Rest Stop
- My Secret Affection
- My Senpai Is Annoying
- My Sister Took My Fiancé and Now I'm Being Courted by a Beastly Prince
- My Sister, the Cat
- My Sketchy Roommate
- My Status as an Assassin Obviously Exceeds the Hero's
- My Stepmother and Stepsisters Aren't Wicked
- My Wife Has No Emotion
- My Younger Knight Takes Care of Me in Another World
- Mysterious Disappearances
- Mythical Beast Investigator
- Nagahama to Be, or Not to Be
- Nakamura-san, the Uninvited Gyaru
- Namekawa-san Won't Take a Licking!
- Nameless Asterism
- Natsume Wants to be Trained
- Necromance
- Nemu the Corpse Bearer
- New Game!
- Nicola Traveling Around the Demons' World
- Night of the Living Cat
- Nightfall Travelers
- Nirvana
- No Game No Life
- No God in Eden
- No Longer Allowed in Another World
- No Matter What You Say, Furi-san Is Scary!
- No Spicy Romance Allowed!
- Non Non Biyori
- Nono's Phantom Shop
- Noss and Zakuro
- Not Lives
- Now Loading...!
- Now That We Draw
- NTR: Netsuzou Trap
- Nurse Hitomi's Monster Infirmary
- Obey Me! The Comic
- Ojojojo
- Only I Know the World Is Ending and Getting Killed by Rampaging Beasts Only Makes Me Stronger
- Only the Stars Know
- Orange
- Orb: On the Movements of the Earth
- Otaku Elf
- Otome Mania!!
- Otonari Complex
- Our Dining Table
  - Our Dining Table: Seconds, Please!
- Our Dreams at Dusk
- Our Sweet One-Room Apartment
- Our Teachers Are Dating!
- Our Torsos Align: Human × Monster Love
- Our Wonderful Days
- Pandora in the Crimson Shell: Ghost Urn
- Pendulum: The Beastmen Omegaverse Saga
- Penguindrum
- Perfect Addiction
- Pet Shop of Horrors
- Phenomenon X: Paranormal Crime Files
- Play Me Softly
- Please Tell Me! Galko-chan
- Plum Crazy! Tales of a Tiger-Striped Cat
- Plus-Sized Elf
  - Shin Plus-Sized Elf
- Polar Bear Café
- Pompo: The Cinéphile
- Precarious Woman Executive Miss Black General
- Primitive Boyfriend
- Printernia Nippon
- Puniru Is a Kawaii Slime
- Punks Triangle
  - Punks Triangle stitch
- Qualia the Purple
- Rainbow and Black
- Ramen Wolf and Curry Tiger
- Raul and His Vampire Prince
- Reborn as an Aristocratic Scoundrel, I Broke the Game and Mastered Magic Beyond Limits!
- Re-Living My Life with a Boyfriend Who Doesn't Remember Me
- Re:Monster
- Reborn as a Barrier Master
- Reborn as a Space Mercenary: I Woke Up Piloting the Strongest Starship!
- Red Riding Hood and the Big Sad Wolf
- Reincarnated as a Dragon Hatchling
- Reincarnated as a Sword
  - Reincarnated as a Sword: Another Wish
- Reincarnated Into a Game as the Hero's Friend: Running the Kingdom Behind the Scenes
- Reluctant Space Commander: From Death Wish to Galactic Hero!
- Restart After Coming Back Home
  - Restart After Growing Hungry
- Ride Your Wave
- Ripples in the River
- Robo Sapiens: Tales of Tomorrow
- ROLL OVER AND DIE: I Will Fight for an Ordinary Life with My Love and Cursed Sword!!
- Romelia War Chronicle: The Count's Daughter Rallies an Army in the Wake of Mankind's Victory
- Royal Tailor: Clothier to the Crown
- Rozen Maiden
- Rozi in the Labyrinth
- Sacrifice of My Manly Soul
- Sadako-san and Sadako-chan
- Saint Seiya: Saintia Shō
- Sakurai-san Wants to Be Noticed
- Sarazanmai: Reo and Mabu
  - Sarazanmai Official Anthology
- Satan's Secretary
- Satoko and Nada
- Sazan & Comet Girl
- Scarlet
- School Zone Girls
- Sea Melt Lover
- Seaside Stranger: Umibe no Étranger
  - Seaside Stranger: Harukaze no Étranger
- Secret of the Princess
- semelparous
- Senran Kagura
- Servamp
- She Professed Herself Pupil of the Wise Man
- Sheep Princess in Wolf's Clothing
- Sheeply Horned Witch Romi
- Shibanban: Super Cute Doggies
- Shomin Sample
- SHWD
- Skeleton Knight in Another World
- Skip and Loafer
- Sleeping Dead
- Sleeping Idiot
- Slime Saint
- Slow Life In Another World (I Wish!)
- Slumbering Beauty
- Smell
- Soara and the House of Monsters
- Soloist in a Cage
- Someone's Girlfriend
- Sorcerous Stabber Orphen
- Sorry for My Familiar
- Soul Liquid Chambers
- Space Battleship Yamato
- Space Pirate Captain Harlock
- Species Domain
- Spirit Circle
- Spriggan
- Stay by My Side After the Rain
- Steam Reverie in Amber
- Strawberry Panic!
- Strike Witches: 1937 Fuso Sea Incident
  - Strike Witches: Maidens in the Sky
  - Strike Witches: One-Winged Witches
  - Strike Witches: The Sky That Connects Us
- Succubus & Hitman
- Summer Ghost
- Super Sentai: Himitsu Sentai Gorenger
- Superwomen in Love! Honey Trap and Rapid Rabbit
- Sweet Room Escape
- Sword of the Demon Hunter: Kijin Gentōshō
- Sworn Brothers on the Farm
- Syrup: A Yuri Anthology
- Tales of the Hundred Monsters Next Door
- Tales of Zestiria
- Tamamo-chan's a Fox!
- Tease Me Harder: A Sweet and Kinky Romance
- Tetragrammaton Labyrinth
- That Girl I'm Interested In Is a Maid From The Abyss
- That Time I Got Stuck to the Guy I Hate
- The Ancient Magus' Bride
  - The Ancient Magus' Bride: Fragments Collection
  - The Ancient Magus' Bride: Jack Flash and the Faerie Case Files
  - The Ancient Magus' Bride: Wizard's Blue
- The Apothecary Is Gonna Make This Ragged Elf Happy
- The Barbarian's Bride
- The Beast King and His Apprentice
- The Berserker NPC Unknowingly Destroys the World
- The Brave-Tuber
- The Bride & the Exorcist Knight
- The Bride Was a Boy
- The Case Files of Jeweler Richard
- The Cat Who Didn't Believe in "What-ifs"
- The Clingy New Hire Keeps Asking Me Out
- The Concierge at Hokkyoku Department Store
- The Condemned Villainess Goes Back in Time and Aims to Become the Ultimate Villain
- The Conditions of Paradise
  - The Conditions of Paradise: Azure Dreams
  - The Conditions of Paradise: Our First Time
- The Cornered Mouse Dreams of Cheese
  - The Carp on the Chopping Block Jumps Twice
- The Count of Monte Cristo
- The Country Without Humans
- The Dangers in My Heart
  - The Dangers in My Heart: The Romantic Comedy Won't Start
- The Death Defying Princess Creates a Yuri Harem to Survive
- The Delinquent and the Transfer Student
- The Demon Girl Next Door
- The Demon King is Way Too Overprotective!
- The Dragon King's Imperial Wrath: Falling in Love with the Bookish Princess of the Rat Clan
- The Dragon Knight's Beloved
- The Duke of Death and His Maid
- The Duke Is Obsessed with the Vicious Omega
- The Dungeon of Black Company
- The Eccentric Doctor of the Moon Flower Kingdom
- The Evil Secret Society of Cats
- The Exo-Drive Reincarnation Games: All-Japan Isekai Battle Tournament!
- The Fed-Up Office Lady Wants to Serve the Villainess
- The Feisty Omega and His Twin Mates
- The Girl from the Other Side: Siúil, a Rún
- The Girl I Want Is So Handsome!
- The Girl in the Arcade
- The Great Snake's Bride
- The Handsome Catboy Wants to be His Pet
- The Haunted Bookstore – Gateway to a Parallel Universe
- The Hidden Dungeon Only I Can Enter
- The High School Life of a Fudanshi
- The Idaten Deities Know Only Peace
- The Ideal Sponger Life
- The Invincible Shovel
- The Invisible Man and His Soon-to-Be Wife
- The Journey of a Dark Elf with Fading Powers
- The Kaiju Autopsy
- The King of Fighters: A New Beginning
- The Kingdoms of Ruin
- The Knight Blooms Behind Castle Walls
- The Knight Captain Is the New Princess-to-Be
- The Lady Knight and the Beast-Eared Child
- The Last Elf
- The Last Uniform
- The Legend of Dororo and Hyakkimaru
- The Long Summer of August 31st
- The Lying Bride and the Same-Sex Marriage Debate
- The Masterful Cat Is Depressed Again Today
- The Misdeeds of an Extremely Arrogant Villain Aristocrat
- The Moon Cries at the Final Wish
- The Most Heretical Last Boss Queen: From Villainess to Savior
- The Most Notorious "Talker" Runs the World's Greatest Clan
- The Muscle Girl Next Door
- The NPCs in This Village Sim Game Must Be Real!
- The Oblivious Girl and the Maidenly Man
- The One-Eyed, One-Armed, One-Legged Sorcerer
- The Other Side of Secret
- The Prince's Body Pillow
- The Princess I Loved in My Past Life Is Now a Middle-Aged Dad
- The Sacred Blacksmith
- The Saint's Magic Power Is Omnipotent
  - The Saint's Magic Power Is Omnipotent: The Other Saint
- The Savior's Book Café Story in Another World
- The Second Alpha
- The Secret of Friendship
- Sensei's Mail-Order Food
- The Seven Princes of the Thousand-Year Labyrinth
- The Skull Dragon's Precious Daughter
- The Sorcerer King of Destruction and the Golem of the Barbarian Queen
- The Strange Adventure of a Broke Mercenary
- The Strange House
- The Summer You Were There
- The Tale of a Little Alchemist Blessed by the Spirits
- The Tale of the Outcasts
- The Testament of Sister New Devil
  - The Testament of Sister New Devil Storm!
- The Titan's Bride
- The Tomorrow I Want to See with Kako: A Time-Loop Romantic Comedy
- The Too-Perfect Saint: Tossed Aside by My Fiancé and Sold To Another Kingdom
- The Tree of Death: Yomotsuhegui
- The Tunnel to Summer, the Exit of Goodbyes
- The Two Lions
- The Two of Them Are Pretty Much Like This
- The Valiant Must Fall
- The Villainess Who Has Been Killed 108 Times: She Remembers Everything!
- The Voynich Hotel
- The Walking Cat: A Cat's-Eye-View of the Zombie Apocalypse
- The Weakest Contestant in All Space and Time
- The Weakest Tamer Began a Journey to Pick Up Trash
- The White Mage Doesn't Want to Raise the Hero's Level
- The Wicked Princess and Her Twelve Eyes: The Legendary Villainess and Her Elite Assassins
- The Wize Wize Beasts of the Wizarding Wizdoms
- The World's Fastest Level Up
- There's a Demon Lord on the Floor
- There's No Freaking Way I'll be Your Lover! Unless...
- They Are Still Being Shaken This Morning
- Thigh High: Reiwa Hanamaru Academy
- This Is Screwed Up, but I Was Reincarnated as a Girl in Another World!
- This Time Around, My Lovesick Hero Will Keep Me Alive … If I'm Lucky!
- This World is Worth Fighting For
- Though I Am an Inept Villainess: Tale of the Butterfly-Rat Body Swap in the Maiden Court
- Throw Away the Suit Together
- Thunderbolt Fantasy
- Tiger and Dragon
- Time Stop Hero
- Tokyo Revengers
  - Todai Revengers
  - Tokyo Revengers: A Letter from Keisuke Baji
- Tokyo Undead
- Tomo-chan Is a Girl!
- Tomodachi × Monster
- Tonight, I Have a Date with a Serial Killer
- Too Many Losing Heroines!
- Toradora!
- Total Eclipse of the Eternal Heart
- Training Mister Sakurada
- Transparent Light Blue
- Trapped in a Dating Sim: The World of Otome Games is Tough for Mobs
- True Love Fades Away When the Contract Ends
- Two Guys at the Vet Clinic
- Uesugi-kun Wants to Quit Being a Girl
- Ultra Kaiju Humanization Project
- Ultraman (Kazuo Umezu)
- Unexpectedly Naughty Fukami
- Unicorns Aren't Horny
- Unmagical Girl
- Until I Meet My Husband
- Ushiyama-san
- Uzaki-chan Wants to Hang Out!
- Venus Versus Virus
- Versailles of the Dead
- Voiceful
- vs. Love
- Wadanohara and the Great Blue Sea
- Wait, I Love You
- Wakaba Won't Give Up!
- Wandmaker of the Ruined World
- Wanna Be My Dress-Up Lover?
- We Are Not Beasts
- We Started a Threesome!
- We Swore to Meet in the Next Life and That's When Things Got Weird!
- Wet Dream Aquarium
- What He Who Doesn't Believe in Fate Says
- What the Font?! A Manga Guide to Western Typeface
- When a Clueless First-Person Shooter Player Falls into Another World
- Who Says Warriors Can't be Babes?
- Why Don't You Eat Me, My Dear Wolf?
- Wild Love: A BL Guide to the Animal Kingdom
- Wild Roses and Pretenders
- Wimpy Demon King and Tsundere Hero
- Witch Buster
- Witches
- Wolf's Daughter: A Werewolf's Tale
- Wonder Cat Kyuu-chan
- Wonder Cats
- Wonderland
- Working as a Goddess!
- World End Solte
- World War Blue
- X-Gender
- Yakuza Fiancé: Raise wa Tanin ga Ii
- Yakuza Reincarnation
- Yes, No, or Maybe?
- Yoichi & Tsugumo
- Yokai Cats
- Yokai Rental Shop
- Yokohama Kaidashi Kikou
- Yonoi Tsukihiko's Happy Hell
- You Are My Alpha
- You Like Me, Not My Daughter?!
- Young Ladies Don't Play Fighting Games
- Young Miss Holmes
- Your Meteor, Hidden in Flowers
- Yuri Yuri Panic
- Zero's Familiar

==== Ghost Ship (manga) ====
- 2.5 Dimensional Seduction
- 12 Dirty Deeds to Unite the Princess and Her Heroine
- Ayakashi Triangle
- Becoming a Princess Knight and Working at a Yuri Brothel
- Betrayed by the Hero, I Formed a MILF Party with His Mom!
- Booty Royale: Never Go Down Without a Fight!
- Building a Monster Girl Harem with Forbidden Science
- Call Girl in Another World
- Cat in a Hot Girls' Dorm
- Creature Girls: A Hands-On Field Journal in Another World
- Darling in the Franxx
- Desire Pandora
- Destiny Lovers
- Devilish Darlings Portal Fantasy
- Do You Like Big Girls?
- Does a Hot Elf Live Next Door to You?
- Double Your Pleasure – A Twin Yuri Anthology
- Ero Ninja Scrolls
- Even the Student Council Has Its Holes!
- Girls Zombie Party
- Gunbured × Sisters
- Harem Camp!
- How to Build a Dungeon: Book of the Demon King
- I Don't Know, Yoshida-san
- I'm Fine With Being the Second Girlfriend
- I'm Not a Succubus!
- I'm Not Meat: Get Your Filthy Paws Off Me!
- Imaizumi Brings All the Gals to His House
- Inside the Tentacle Cave
- Into the Deepest, Most Unknowable Dungeon
- Isekai Affair: 10 Years After Defeating the Demon King, the Hero Cheats on His Wife With a Warrior Woman Who Lost Her Husband
- It's Just Not My Night: Tale of a Fallen Vampire Queen
- JK Haru Is a Sex Worker in Another World
- Let's Make a Harem in a Zombie World!
- Lilia's Pregnancy Spells the World's End
- Makina-san's a Love Bot?!
- Manga Diary of a Male Porn Star
- Might as Well Cheat: I Got Transported to Another World Where I Can Live My Wildest Dreams!
- Monster Marriage Shop
- My Former Student Is a Hunk?!
- My Sword Saint Master Is Too Cute to Live With!
- My Useless Cuddle Skill Awakened, and Now I’m Building the Ultimate Harem!
- Parallel Paradise
- Peter Grill and the Philosopher's Time
- Please Go Home, Miss Akutsu!
- Rebel Hero: I Will Use My Skills to Control the Scheming Princess's Heart and Body
- Record of Chrono's War: Apparently I'm Only the Strongest in Bed
- Record of Lustful Warriors: The Rod Master's Unstoppable Conquest in Another World
- Rise of the Outlaw Tamer and His Wild S-Rank Cat Girl
- Saki the Succubus Hungers Tonight
- Secret Rites with the Holy Maidens
- She's the Strongest Bride, But I'm Stronger in Night Battles: A Harem Chronicle of Advancing Through Cunning Tactics
- Shiori's Diary
- Sundome!! Milky Way
- Super HxEros
- Survival in Another World with My Mistress!
- Tamamori's Fantasies Never Stop!
- The 100 Girlfriends Who Really, Really, Really, Really, Really Love You
  - The 100 Girlfriends Who Really, Really, Really, Really, Really Love You: Secret Love Story (light novel)
- The Cuckolding Wizard's Adventure
- The Cursed Sword Master's Harem Life: By the Sword, For the Sword
- The Elf Sisters Can't Wait for the Night
- The Erotical Wizard and His Twelve Brides
- The Hungry Succubus Wants to Consume Him
- The Villainous Noble Is Way Too Fond of MILF Heroines
- The Witches of Adamas
- To Love Ru
  - To Love Ru Darkness
- Virgin Knight: I Became the Frontier Lord in a World Ruled by Women (manga and light novel)
- Virgin Ventures: The Hilarious Hijinks of Erotic Amateurs
- Welcome to Succubus High!
- Who Wants to Marry a Billionaire?
- Wicked Trapper: Hunter of Heroes
- World's End Harem
- World's End Harem: Fantasia
  - World's End Harem: Fantasia Academy
- Yandere Dark Elf: She Chased Me All the Way From Another World!
- Yokai Girls
- Yuuna and the Haunted Hot Springs

==== Steamship (manga) ====
- A Suitable Fetish
- Adored By an Elite Officer: Could This Be Love?
- Alpha Wolfgirl x Omega Wolfboy
- At Your Service in Another World
- Before You Discard Me, I Shall Have My Way With You
- Don't Hold Back, Lord Hades
- Fire in His Fingertips: A Flirty Fireman Ravishes Me with His Smoldering Gaze
- Flirting with my Bear-like Boyfriend
- GAME: Between the Suits
- Guilty Smile
- Healer for the Shadow Hero
- His Sensual Whisper: The Voice That Sets Me On Fire
- I Can't Refuse S
- I Want You to Make Me Beautiful
- I'll Never be Your Crown Princess!
  - I'll Never be Your Crown Princess! – Betrothed
- Ladies on Top
- Loved by Two Fiancés
- Loving Moon Dog
- Loyal Soldier, Lustful Beast (light novel)
- My Boss Is a Giant: He Manages My Every Need with Enormous Skill
- Outbride: Beauty and the Beasts
- Revenge: Mrs. Wrong
- Seduced by the Demon King: A Sensual Rebirth
- Sex Drive
- Shindou-kun's Tight Squeeze: Helpless Against His Alluring Touch
- Sweet Heat Before Falling in Love: The CEO and His Fated Omega
- The Missing “O” (webtoon)
- The Obsessed Mage and His Beloved Statue Bride: She Cannot Resist His Seductive Voice (manga and light novel)
- The Scheming Crown Prince's (Supposedly) Wicked Consort
- The Tea Ceremony Master's Rich and Steamy Service: Spoiled by His Skillful Hands
- The Trapped Former Villainess Wants to Escape from the Sadistic Prince
- The Villainess and the Demon Knight (manga and light novel)
- The Yakuza and His Omega: Raw Desire
- Virgin Marriage: A Maiden Voyage into Passion's Embrace
- Werewolves Going Crazy Over Me (webtoon)
- You Will Become My Wife

=== Airship (novel/light novel) ===
- 7th Time Loop: The Villainess Enjoys a Carefree Life Married to Her Worst Enemy!
  - 7th Time Loop: The Villainess Enjoys a Carefree Life Married to Her Worst Enemy! Short Story Collection
- A Good Day Starts with Cats and Books
- A Little Princess (Yū Shiina)
- A Serious Error in Chihaya-chan's Reputation
- A Tale of the Secret Saint
  - A Tale of the Secret Saint ZERO
- Accomplishments of the Duke's Daughter
- Adachi and Shimamura
- Al the Adventurer: That Magic Shouldn't Work!
- Alice's Adventures in Wonderland and Through the Looking-Glass (Kriss Sison)
- Alice in the Country of Diamonds
- Anne of Green Gables (Maki Minami)
- Arifureta: From Commonplace to World's Strongest
  - Arifureta: From Commonplace to World's Strongest Zero
- At Night, I Become a Monster
- An Autumn in Amber, a Zero-Second Journey
- Ballad of a Shinigami
- Berserk of Gluttony
- Betrothed to My Sister's Ex
- Bloom Into You: Regarding Saeki Sayaka
- Boogiepop
- Bowing to Love: The Noble and the Gladiator
- Breathless Time Traveler
- Buck Naked in Another World
- Chronicles of an Aristocrat Reborn in Another World
- Classroom of the Elite
  - Classroom of the Elite: Year 2
- Clockwork Planet
- Dance in the Vampire Bund: Secret Chronicles
- The Disappearance of Hatsune Miku
- Didn't I Say to Make My Abilities Average in the Next Life?!
- Disciple of the Lich: Or How I Was Cursed by the Gods and Dropped Into the Abyss!
- Division Maneuver
- Drugstore in Another World: The Slow Life of a Cheat Pharmacist
- Easygoing Territory Defense by the Optimistic Lord: Production Magic Turns a Nameless Village into the Strongest Fortified City
- Failure Frame: I Became the Strongest and Annihilated Everything with Low-Level Spells
- Fluffy Café in Another World
- Free Life Fantasy Online: Immortal Princess
- Gear × Magic: Reincarnated as an Engineer, I'll Save the Villainous Princess
- Godzilla Minus One
- Goetia Shock
- Grimgar of Fantasy and Ash
- Hello World
- Heroine? Saint? No, I'm an All-Works Maid (and Proud of It)!
- History of the Kingdom of the Orcsen: How the Barbarian Orcish Nation Came to Burn Down the Peaceful Elfland
- How a Realist Hero Rebuilt the Kingdom
- I Abandoned My Engagement Because My Sister is a Tragic Heroine, but Somehow I Became Entangled with a Righteous Prince
- I am Blue, in Pain, and Fragile
- I Became a Necromancer After Beating Up My Angel Guide and Accidentally Triggered the Apocalypse
- I Got Married to the Girl I Hate Most in Class
- I Had That Same Dream Again
- I Have a Secret
- I Like Villains, so I Reincarnated as One
- I Swear I Won't Bother You Again!
- I Want to Eat Your Pancreas
- I Will Forget This Feeling Someday
- I Wish I Could Meet You Again on the Hill Where That Flower Blooms
- I'm in Love with the Villainess
  - I'm in Love with the Villainess: She's so Cheeky for a Commoner
  - I'm in Love with the Villainess: Come on and Notice Me Already
- I'm Running for Crown Princess, but All I Want is a Steady Paycheck!
- I'm the Evil Lord of an Intergalactic Empire!
  - I'm the Heroic Knight of an Intergalactic Empire!
- In Another World with My Cat: A Software Engineer Uses Code to Master Magic and Build a Territory
- Irina: The Vampire Cosmonaut
- Kuma Kuma Kuma Bear
- Legend of the Accidental Sword Saint: Playing the Mentor from the Sidelines
- Liar's Journey: Reborn as a False Hero - I'll Save the Tragic Heroine from Every Death Route!
- Loner Life in Another World
- Magic Maker: How to Create Magic in Another World
- Magical Buffs: The Support Caster Is Stronger Than He Realized!
- Magic User: Reborn in Another World as a Max Level Wizard
- Modern Dungeon Capture Starting with Broken Skills
- Modern Villainess: It's Not Easy Building a Corporate Empire Before the Crash
- Monster Girl Doctor
- Monster Musume – Monster Girls on the Job!
- Muscles are Better Than Magic!
- Mushoku Tensei: Jobless Reincarnation
  - Mushoku Tensei: Jobless Reincarnation – A Journey of Two Lifetimes [Special Book]
  - Mushoku Tensei: Jobless Reincarnation – Recollections
  - Mushoku Tensei: Redundant Reincarnation
- My Girlfriend Cheated on Me, and Now My Flirty Underclassman Won't Leave Me Alone!
- My Status as an Assassin Obviously Exceeds the Hero's
- Neon Genesis Evangelion: ANIMA
- Occultic;Nine
- Penguindrum
- Perfect Blue: Awaken from a Dream
  - Perfect Blue: Complete Metamorphosis
- Peter Pan (Kriss Sison)
- Pita-Ten
- Planet of the Orcs
- Pollyanna (Yukawa Kazuno)
- Predator Witches
- Pride and Prejudice (Shiei)
- Qualia the Purple
- Raven of the Inner Palace
- Reborn as a Space Mercenary: I Woke Up Piloting the Strongest Starship!
- Reborn as an Assassin's Apprentice
- Record of Lodoss War
- Reincarnated as a Dragon Hatchling
- Reincarnated as a Sword
- Reincarnated Into a Game as the Hero's Friend: Running the Kingdom Behind the Scenes
- Reluctant Space Commander: From Death Wish to Galactic Hero!
- Restaurant to Another World
- Ride Your Wave
- Riku Can't Be a Goddess
- Ripping Someone Open Only Makes Them Bleed
- ROLL OVER AND DIE: I Will Fight for an Ordinary Life with My Love and Cursed Sword!!
- Sarazanmai
- Saving a Weapon Shop From Bankruptcy After the Demon King's Defeat
- SCP Foundation: Iris Through the Looking Glass
- She Professed Herself Pupil of the Wise Man
- Skeleton Knight in Another World
- Space Orc: Barbarian Raider of the Stars, Aiming for the Queen!
- Strawberry Panic!
- Summer Ghost
- Survival in Another World with My Mistress!
- Sword of the Demon Hunter: Kijin Gentōshō
- The Ancient Magus' Bride: The Golden Yarn
  - The Ancient Magus' Bride: The Silver Yarn
- The Berserker NPC Unknowingly Destroys the World
- The Case Files of Jeweler Richard
- The Condemned Villainess Goes Back in Time and Aims to Become the Ultimate Villain
- The Dangers in My Heart
- The Devil Princess
- The Evil Queen's Beautiful Principles
- The Faceless Mercenary Wants to Settle Down: Homestead at the Edge of the Galaxy
- The Haunted Bookstore – Gateway to a Parallel Universe
- The Hidden Dungeon Only I Can Enter
- The Invincible Shovel
- The Mimosa Confessions
- The Misdeeds of an Extremely Arrogant Villain Aristocrat
- The Most Heretical Last Boss Queen: From Villainess to Savior
- The Most Notorious "Talker" Runs the World's Greatest Clan
- The Neverending Winter, the Land of Broken Dreams
- The NPCs in this Village Sim Game Must Be Real!
- The Princess and the Goblin (okama)
- The Saint's Magic Power Is Omnipotent
- The Secret Garden (Yū Shiina)
- The Sorcerer King of Destruction and the Golem of the Barbarian Queen
- The Strange Adventure of a Broke Mercenary
- The Tale of a Little Alchemist Blessed by the Spirits
- The Too-Perfect Saint: Tossed Aside by My Fiancé and Sold to Another Kingdom
- The Tunnel to Summer, the Exit of Goodbyes
- The Twelve Kingdoms
- The Weakest Tamer Began a Journey to Pick Up Trash
- The Wicked Princess and Her Twelve Eyes: The Legendary Villainess and Her Elite Assassins
- The Wonderful Wizard of Oz & The Marvelous Land of Oz (Kriss Sison)
- There's No Freaking Way I'll be Your Lover! Unless...
  - There's No Freaking Way I'll be Your Lover! Unless… Short Stories
  - There's No Freaking Way I'll be Your Lover! Unless… Spin-off Collection
- Though I Am an Inept Villainess: Tale of the Butterfly-Rat Body Swap in the Maiden Court
- Titan (Mado Nozaki)
- To Every You I've Loved Before
  - To Me, the One Who Loved You
- Too Many Losing Heroines!
  - Too Many Losing Heroines! Short Stories
- Toradora!
- Trapezium
- Trapped in a Dating Sim: The World of Otome Games is Tough for Mobs
  - Trapped in a Dating Sim: The World of That Otome Game is Tough for Us
- True Love Fades Away When the Contract Ends
- True Tenchi Muyo!
- Until I Meet My Husband
- Villager A Wants to Save the Villainess No Matter What!
- Vivy Prototype
- Wait for Me Yesterday
- Wandmaker of the Ruined World
- When a Clueless First-Person Shooter Player Falls into Another World
- When It Rains, It Pours
- Wicked City
- Witch and Mercenary
- The World's Fastest Level Up
- Yes, No, or Maybe?
  - Yes, No or Maybe? – Center of the World
  - Yes, No or Maybe? – Where Home Is

=== Siren (audiobooks) ===
- A Good Day Starts with Cats and Books
- Accomplishments of the Duke's Daughter
- Adachi and Shimamura
- Astrolabe Rebirth
- At Night, I Become a Monster
- Berserk of Gluttony
- Betrothed to My Sister's Ex
- Classroom of the Elite
  - Classroom of the Elite: Year 2
- Didn't I Say to Make My Abilities Average in the Next Life?!
- Distorted I Love You
- Easygoing Territory Defense by the Optimistic Lord: Production Magic Turns a Nameless Village into the Strongest Fortified City
- Heroine? Saint? No, I'm an All-Works Maid (and Proud of It)!
- I Abandoned My Engagement Because My Sister Is a Tragic Heroine
- I Got Married to the Girl I Hate Most in Class
- I Had That Same Dream Again
- I Have a Secret
- I Want to Eat Your Pancreas
- I Wish I Could Meet You Again on the Hill Where That Flower Blooms
- I'm in Love with the Villainess
  - I'm in Love with the Villainess: She's so Cheeky for a Commoner
- I'm the Evil Lord of an Intergalactic Empire!
  - I'm the Heroic Knight of an Intergalactic Empire!
- KinnPorsche
- Kuma Kuma Kuma Bear
- Legend of Exorcism: Tianbao Fuyao Lu
- Loner Life in Another World
- Lout of Count's Family
- Love Between Fairy and Devil
- Loyal Soldier, Lustful Beast
- Magic Maker: How to Create Magic in Another World
- Magic User: Reborn in Another World as a Max Level Wizard
- Monster Musume – Monster Girls on the Job!
- Mushoku Tensei: Jobless Reincarnation
  - Mushoku Tensei: Jobless Reincarnation - Recollections
  - Mushoku Tensei: Redundant Reincarnation
- My Girlfriend Cheated on Me, and Now My Flirty Underclassman Won't Leave Me Alone!
- My Husband and I Sleep in a Coffin
- Neon Genesis Evangelion: ANIMA
- Perfect Blue: Complete Metamorphosis
- Qualia the Purple
- Reborn as a Space Mercenary: I Woke Up Piloting the Strongest Starship!
- Record of Lodoss War: The Grey Witch
- Reincarnated as a Dragon Hatchling
- Reincarnated as a Sword
- Reincarnated Into a Game as the Hero’s Friend: Running the Kingdom Behind the Scenes
- Riku Can't Be a Goddess
- Ripping Someone Open Only Makes Them Bleed
- Riverbay Road Men's Dormitory
- ROLL OVER AND DIE: I Will Fight for an Ordinary Life with My Love and Cursed Sword!
- SCP Foundation: Iris Through the Looking Glass
- She Professed Herself Pupil of the Wise Man
- Skeleton Knight in Another World
- Survival in Another World with My Mistress!
- Sword of the Demon Hunter: Kijin Gentōshō
- The Condemned Villainess Goes Back in Time and Aims to Become the Ultimate Villain
- The Evil Queen's Beautiful Principles
- The Haunted Bookstore – Gateway to a Parallel Universe
- The Husky and His White Cat Shizun: Erha He Ta De Bai Mao Shizun
- The NPCs in this Village Sim Game Must Be Real!
- The Saint's Magic Power Is Omnipotent
- The Twelve Kingdoms
- The Weakest Tamer Began a Journey to Pick Up Trash
- The Wicked Princess and Her Twelve Eyes: The Legendary Villainess and Her Elite Assassins
- The World's Fastest Level Up
- Toradora!
- Trapped in a Dating Sim: The World of Otome Games is Tough for Mobs
- True Love Fades Away When the Contract Ends
- Until I Meet My Husband
- When a Clueless First-Person Shooter Player Falls into Another World
- Witch and Mercenary

=== Korean / Chinese / Thai novels ===
- Beacon of Light in the Dark Sea
- Hidden Love
- KinnPorsche
- Lout of Count's Family
- Love Between Fairy and Devil
- Till the End of the Moon

==== Danmei ====
- After the Disabled God of War Became My Concubine
- Astrolabe Rebirth
- Ballad of Sword and Wine: Qiang Jin Jiu
- Case File Compendium: Bing an Ben
- Copper Coins: Tong Qian Kan Shi
- Dinghai Fusheng Records
- Golden Assistant
- Golden Terrace
- Grandmaster of Demonic Cultivation: Mo Dao Zu Shi
- Guardian: Zhen Hun
- Heaven Official's Blessing: Tian Guan Ci Fu
- Joyful Reunion
- Legend of Exorcism: Tianbao Fuyao Lu
- Look Up at Me: Deng Ni Yang Wang
- Little Mushroom
- Panguan: The Twelfth Gate
- Peerless
- Remnants of Filth: Yuwu
- Revenged Love
- Riverbay Road Men's Dormitory
- Run Wild: Sa Ye
- Seizing Dreams
- Silent Reading: Mo Du
- Stars of Chaos: Sha Po Lang
- The Disabled Tyrant's Beloved Pet Fish: Canji Baojun De Zhangxin Yu Chong
- The Husky and His White Cat Shizun: Erha He Ta De Bai Mao Shizun
- The Scum Villain's Self-Saving System: Ren Zha Fanpai Zijiu Xitong
- The Sword Named No Way Out: Jian Ming Bu Nai He
- The Villain's White Hallow
- The White Cat's Divine Scratching Pos
- The Wife Comes First: Qi Wei Shang
- There's Something Wrong with the Chief: Du Zhu You Bing
- Thousand Autumns: Qian Qiu
- Three Hundred Years of Longing: Bu Jian Shang Xian San Bai Nian
- Thrice Married to a Salted Fish
- Transform Me, Mark Me
- Twin Jades of Jiangdong
- You've Got Mail: The Perils of Pigeon Post – Fei Ge Jiao You Xu Jin Shen

==== Baihe ====
- The Beauty’s Blade: Mei Ren Jian

=== Webtoons ===
- Beetle Hands

==== Manhwa ====
- A Stepmother's Märchen
- Bastard
- BOSS, BXTCH, BABY
- Checkmate
- Dear. Door
- ENNEAD
- How to Survive as a Maid in a Horror Game
- It's Just a Dream… Right?!
- Killing Stalking
- King the Land
- Lost in the Cloud
- Love Is an Illusion!
  - Love Is an Illusion! – The Queen
- Low Tide in Twilight
- My Bias Is Showing!?
- No Love Zone
- Obnoxious Hero-kun
- Our Sunny Days
- Painter of the Night
- Perfect Buddy
- PULSE
- Punch Drunk Love
- Reborn Rich
- Roses and Champagne
- The Big Apple
- The Dangerous Convenience Store
- The Greatest Wolf of My Life
- The Lady and Her Butler
- The New Recruit
- What It Means to Be You
- Who Made Me a Princess
- Winter Wolf

==== Manhua ====
- Dinghai Fusheng Records
- Grandmaster of Demonic Cultivation
- I Ship My Rival x Me

== Former titles ==
=== Original series ===
- Chugworth Academy
- Earthsong
- Inverloch
- Pandora: A Death Jr. Manga
- Speed Racer

=== Seven Seas Entertainment (manga) ===
- Afro Samurai (now licensed by Titan Manga)
- Akatsuki-iro no Senpuku Majo (dropped)
- Angel Beats! Heaven's Door
- Boogiepop Dual: Losers' Circus
- Eve and Eve
- Kodomo no Jikan (rescinded, now licensed by Digital Manga)

=== Novels/light novels ===
- Diva v. Poe
- Gun Princess
- The Pirate and the Princess: The Timelight Stone
