= Love Is an Illusion! =

2018-21 South Korean manhwa by Fargo

사랑은 환상! RR: Sarangeun hwansang! MR: Sarangŭn hwansang!
- Genre: Romance, Boys' love, Omegaverse
- Author: Fargo
- Magazine: Lezhin
- Original run: January 29, 2018 – March 22, 2021
- Collected volumes: 6

Love Is an Illusion! (Korean: 사랑은 환상!) is a South Korean boys' love manhwa written and illustrated by Fargo. The series has an omegaverse setting and follows Hye-sung, an Omega who thought he was an Alpha until recently, and Dojin, an Alpha who cannot stand Omegas. The series was serialized online via Lezhin Comics between January 2018 and March 2021. On February 12, 2022, a sequel, Love Is an Illusion! — The Queen, began serialization.

== Plot ==
Hye-sung has believed he was an Alpha his whole life and dreams of marrying a rich Omega so he can have an easy life. However, after a meeting Dojin, an Omega-hating Alpha, triggers Hye-sung's heat it is revealed he was actually an Omega. Unable to accept the truth, Hye-sung decides to become an Alpha no matter what.

== Publication ==
Written and illustrated by Fargo, Love Is an Illusion! was serialized on Lezhin Comics from January 29, 2018, to March 22, 2021. Hye-sung and Dojin were originally side characters of Fargo's previous work, If You Hate Me So, but were popular enough that they were given their own series. On February 12, 2022, a sequel, Love Is an Illusion! — The Queen, began serialization.

The series is licensed for English paperback releases in North America by Seven Seas Entertainment.

| No. | Release date | ISBN |
|---|---|---|
| 1 | September 27, 2022 | 978-1-63858-565-7 |
| 2 | April 18, 2023 | 978-1-63858-736-1 |
| 3 | July 4, 2023 | 978-1-63858-882-5 |
| 4 | October 10, 2023 | 978-1-68579-607-5 |
| 5 | February 13, 2024 | 978-1-68579-768-3 |

== Reception ==
Volume 2 of Love Is an Illusion! charted on Circana BookScan's "Top 20 Adult Graphic Novels" for April and May 2023.

The Comic Book Resources has featured Love Is an Illusion! several times, with Jahanvi Shah including it in their "25 Must-Read Boy's Love Manhwa For BL Fans", praising that series is "known for its beautiful black-and-white art, hilarious characters, and incredibly steamy scenes." In Jason Collins' round up of "17 Hot BL Webtoons Taking The Fandom By Storm" Love Is an Illusion! came in at #10 as "one of the warmest BL webtoons out there."
