= The Bride Was a Boy =

Japanese manga

- Japanese cover

花嫁は元男子。 (Hanayome wa Motodanshi)
- Genre: Romantic comedy
- Manga
- Written by: Chii
- Published by: Asukashinsha
- English publisher: NA: Seven Seas Entertainment
- Published: February 9, 2016
- Volumes: 1

The Bride Was a Boy (Japanese: 花嫁は元男子。, Hepburn: Hanayome wa Motodanshi) is a Japanese autobiographical manga written and illustrated by Chii. It was published in a single volume in February 2016.

== Plot ==
The autobiography follows Chii as she navigates love, sexuality, and gender as a trans woman. She recounts her relationship with her boyfriend and eventual husband, and explains how she physically and legally transitioned.

== Publication ==
The manga was written and illustrated by Chii. It was published in a single tankōbon volume by Asukashinsha on February 9, 2016.

In November 2017, Seven Seas Entertainment announced they licensed the series for English publication. They released the volume on May 8, 2018.

== Reception ==
As part of Anime News Network's spring 2018 manga guide, Amy McNulty, Lynzee Loveridge, and Rebecca Silverman reviewed the volume for the website. All three critics praised the story and art as "heartwarming". The reviewer for Publishers Weekly had similar thoughts about the volume, praising the art and emotion in the plot. Johanna of Comics Worth Reading also praised the volume for being both educational and entertaining. Jason Thompson of Otaku USA recommended the series for similar reasons as other critics, praising the plot and artwork. Sean Gaffney of A Case Suitable for Treatment concurred with Johanna, praising the volume as fun and educational. Melina Dargis of The Fandom Post concurred with previous critics, praising the volume as "touching".

In 2019, the volume included in the Young Adult Library Services Association's list of the Great Graphic Novels for Teens. It was also an honor title for the 2018 Virginia Library Association Graphic Novel Diversity Award.
