= Loving Moon Dog =

Japanese manga series

- First tankōbon volume cover

恋するMOON DOG (Koi Suru Mūn Doggu)
- Genre: Romantic comedy; Supernatural
- Manga
- Written by: Nanpei Yamada
- Published by: Hakusensha
- English publisher: NA: Seven Seas Entertainment
- Imprint: Hana to Yume Comics Special
- Magazine: Hana Yume Ai
- Original run: October 20, 2018 – September 20, 2024
- Volumes: 13
- Manga

Ikemen Kishi o Hirottanda ga Doushitara Ii? Koi Suru Moon Dog Spin-off
- Written by: Nanpei Yamada
- Published by: Hakusensha
- Imprint: Hana to Yume Comics Special
- Magazine: Trifle by Hana to Yume
- Original run: December 5, 2020 – present
- Volumes: 2
- Manga

Inukai-kun no Shippo: Koi Suru Moon Dog Spinoff
- Written by: Nanpei Yamada
- Published by: Hakusensha
- Magazine: Hana Yume Ai
- Original run: December 20, 2024 – present
- Volumes: 3

Loving Moon Dog (恋するMOON DOG, Koi Suru Moon Dog) is a Japanese manga series written and illustrated by Nanpei Yamada. It was serialized in Hakusensha's digital manga magazine Hana Yume Ai from October 2018 to September 2024.

== Synopsis ==
Rikka, a 25-year old dog groomer, rescues an abandoned doberman who later transforms into a man, and asks her to be his lover.

== Publication ==
Written and illustrated by Nanpei Yamada, Loving Moon Dog was serialized in Hakusensha's digital manga magazine Hana Yume Ai from October 20, 2018, to September 20, 2024. Its chapters were collected into thirteen tankōbon volumes released from July 19, 2019, to December 20, 2024.

During their panel at Anime NYC 2024, Seven Seas Entertainment announced that they had licensed the series under their Steamship imprint for English publication beginning in February 2025.

A boy's love spin-off manga, titled Ikemen Kishi o Hirottanda ga Doushitara Ii? Koi Suru Moon Dog Spin-off began serialization in the newly launched Trifle by Hana to Yume digital BL manga magazine on December 5, 2020. The spin-off's chapters have been collected into two tankōbon volumes as of December 2025.

Another spin-off manga, titled Inukai-kun no Shippo: Koi Suru Moon Dog Spinoff, was serialized in Hana Yume Ai from December 20, 2024 to October 20, 2026. The spin-off's chapters have been collected into three tankōbon volumes as of August 2026.

A sequel manga is being planned.

=== Volumes ===
No.	Original release date	Original ISBN	North American release date	North American ISBN
1	July 19, 2019	978-4-592-22701-4	February 18, 2025	979-8-89160-886-3
Stories 1–4; Bonus: "White-haired Iso"; Bonus: "What Happened the First Night"
2	October 18, 2019	978-4-592-22702-1	May 20, 2025	979-8-89160-963-1
Stories 5–8; Story 7.5: "The Day the Plum Tree Blossomed"; Bonus: "The Comforting Dog, Tetsu"; Bonus: "What Happened Saturday Evening"
3	February 20, 2020	978-4-592-22703-8	August 19, 2025	979-8-89160-964-8
Stories 9–12; Bonus: "Strongheart Bond"; Bonus: "What Happened Wednesday Evening"
4	July 20, 2020	978-4-592-22704-5	November 18, 2025	979-8-89373-429-4
Stories 13–16; Bonus: "Momojirou's Dream"; Bonus: "Their Thoughts on Tuesday"
5	February 19, 2021	978-4-592-22705-2	February 17, 2026	979-8-89373-672-4
Stories 17–20; Story 17.5: "Her Majesty's Guard Dog"; Bonus: "The Motherly Dog Chloe"; Bonus: "Rikka-san's Challenge"
6	July 20, 2021	978-4-592-22797-7	July 28, 2026	979-8-89373-673-1
Stories 21–24; Bonus: "Sora's Diary"; Bonus: "What Happened After Wednesday Night"
7	December 20, 2021	978-4-592-22798-4	December 29, 2026	979-8-89561-377-1
8	April 20, 2022	978-4-592-22861-5	May 25, 2027	979-8-89561-378-8
9	November 18, 2022	978-4-592-22864-6	—	—
10	March 20, 2023	978-4-592-22865-3	—	—
11	September 20, 2023	978-4-592-22897-4	—	—
12	May 20, 2024	978-4-592-22898-1	—	—
13	December 20, 2024	978-4-592-22899-8	—	—

=== Ikemen Kishi o Hirottanda ga Doushitara Ii? ===
No.	Original release date	Original ISBN	North American release date	North American ISBN
1	November 18, 2022	978-4-592-22870-7	—	—
2	December 19, 2025	978-4-592-23107-3	—	—

=== Inukai-kun no Shippo ===
No.	Original release date	Original ISBN	North American release date	North American ISBN
1	May 20, 2025	978-4-592-23074-8	—	—
2	December 19, 2025	978-4-592-23104-2	—	—
3	August 20, 2026	978-4-592-23154-7	—	—

== Reception ==
The series won the 12th Anan Manga Award in 2021.
