= Call To Adventure! Defeating Dungeons with a Skill Board =

Japanese light novel series

- First light novel volume cover

冒険家になろう！～スキルボードでダンジョン攻略～ (Bōken-ka ni Narou!: Sukiru Bōdo de Danjon Kōryaku)
- Genre: Adventure, fantasy
- Novel series
- Written by: Aki Hagiu
- Published by: Shōsetsuka ni Narō
- Original run: October 13, 2017 – September 13, 2019
- Light novel
- Written by: Aki Hagiu
- Illustrated by: Teddy
- Published by: Futabasha
- Imprint: M Novels
- Original run: July 30, 2018 – May 30, 2019
- Volumes: 3
- Manga
- Written by: Aki Hagiu
- Illustrated by: Renji Kuriyama
- Published by: Futabasha
- English publisher: NA: Seven Seas Entertainment
- Imprint: Monster Comics
- Magazine: Gaugau Monster
- Original run: September 14, 2018 – present
- Volumes: 13

Call To Adventure! Defeating Dungeons with a Skill Board (冒険家になろう！～スキルボードでダンジョン攻略～, Bōken-ka ni Narou!: Sukiru Bōdo de Danjon Kōryaku) is a Japanese light novel series written by Aki Hagiu and illustrated by Teddy. It was serialized as a web novel on Shōsetsuka ni Narō from October 2017 to September 2019. It was later acquired by Futabasha who published the series under their M Novels imprint from July 2018 to May 2019. A manga adaptation illustrated by Renji Kuriyama began serialization on Futabasha's Gaugau Monster manga website in September 2018.

== Media ==
=== Light novel ===
Written by Aki Hagiu, Call To Adventure! Defeating Dungeons with a Skill Board was originally serialized as a web novel on Shōsetsuka ni Narō from October 13, 2017, to September 13, 2019. It was later acquired by Futabasha who published three volumes with illustrations by Teddy under their M Novels light novel imprint from July 30, 2018, to May 30, 2019.

No.	Release date	ISBN
1	July 30, 2018	978-4-575-24107-5
2	December 18, 2018	978-4-575-24145-7
3	May 30, 2019	978-4-575-24180-8

=== Manga ===
A manga adaptation illustrated by Renji Kuriyama began serialization on Futabasha's Gaugau Monster manga website on September 14, 2018. The manga's chapters have been compiled into thirteen tankōbon volumes as of July 2026.

No.	Original release date	Original ISBN	North American release date	North American ISBN
1	February 28, 2019	978-4-575-41048-8	August 31, 2021	978-1-64827-587-6
2	August 30, 2019	978-4-575-41073-0	November 2, 2021	978-1-64827-614-9
3	April 30, 2020	978-4-575-41116-4	December 7, 2021	978-1-64827-631-6
4	November 30, 2020	978-4-575-41165-2	April 12, 2022	978-1-63858-185-7
5	August 8, 2021	978-4-575-41263-5	February 21, 2023	978-1-63858-598-5
6	February 12, 2022	978-4-575-41365-6	September 19, 2023	978-1-63858-824-5
7	September 15, 2022	978-4-575-41492-9	March 19, 2024	979-8-88843-337-9
8	April 14, 2023	978-4-575-41610-7	September 3, 2024	979-8-89160-036-2
9	October 13, 2023	978-4-575-41750-0	March 11, 2025	979-8-89160-753-8
10	June 14, 2024	978-4-575-41863-7	September 9, 2025	979-8-89373-605-2
11	January 15, 2025	978-4-575-42051-7	March 31, 2026	979-8-89561-839-4
12	January 15, 2026	978-4-575-42183-5	December 22, 2026	979-8-89765-899-2
13	July 15, 2026	978-4-575-42461-4	—	—
