= Sheeply Horned Witch Romi =

Japanese manga series

- First tankōbon volume cover

羊角のマジョロミ (Yōkaku no Majoromi)
- Genre: Dark fantasy; Romantic comedy; Supernatural
- Manga
- Written by: Yoichi Abe
- Published by: Fujimi Shobo
- English publisher: NA: Seven Seas Entertainment
- Imprint: Dragon Comics Age
- Magazine: Bessatsu Dragon Age (2017–2019); Young Dragon Age (2019–2024)
- Original run: September 25, 2017 – June 26, 2024
- Volumes: 3
- icon

Sheeply Horned Witch Romi (Japanese: 羊角のマジョロミ, Hepburn: Yōkaku no Majoromi) is a Japanese manga series written and illustrated by Yoichi Abe. It was serialized in Fujimi Shobo's Bessatsu Dragon Age (rebranded as Young Dragon Age in 2019) from September 2017 to June 2024, with its chapters collected in three tankōbon volumes.

== Publication ==
Written and illustrated by Yoichi Abe, Sheeply Horned Witch Romi started in Fujimi Shobo's Bessatsu Dragon Age on September 25, 2017; the magazine was rebranded as Young Dragon Age starting on December 26, 2019. The series ended serialization on June 26, 2024. Fujimi Shobo collected its chapters in three tankōbon volumes, released from July 9, 2020, to November 9, 2024.

The manga is licensed for English release in North America by Seven Seas Entertainment.

=== Volumes ===
No.	Original release date	Original ISBN	English release date	English ISBN
1	July 9, 2020	978-4-04-073653-2	March 29, 2022	978-1-63858-169-7
2	January 7, 2023	978-4-04-074837-5	October 24, 2023	978-1-63858-380-6
3	November 9, 2024	978-4-04-075677-6	December 23, 2025	979-8-89160-656-2
