= Daily Report About My Witch Senpai =

Japanese manga series

- First tankōbon volume cover

魔女先輩日報 (Majo Senpai Nippō)
- Genre: Fantasy; Romantic comedy
- Manga
- Written by: Maka Mochida
- Published by: Akita Shoten
- English publisher: NA: Seven Seas Entertainment
- Imprint: Princess Comics
- Magazine: Champion Cross
- Original run: August 30, 2018 – October 26, 2026
- Volumes: 5

Daily Report About My Witch Senpai (魔女先輩日報, Majo Senpai Nippō) is a Japanese manga series written and illustrated by Maka Mochida. It was originally published as a webcomic on the author's Pixiv account in March 2018. It was later serialized on Akita Shoten's Champion Cross website from August 2018 to October 2026.

== Synopsis ==
The series is centered around the relationship between Misono and his senior at work, Shizuka. Whenever Misono is in a difficult situation, Shizuka, who is a witch, comes in on a broomstick to help him. Though grateful for her help, Misono believes that Shizuka should use her powers less on errands, due to his belief that she would get exhausted.

== Publication ==
Written and illustrated by Maka Mochida, Daily Report About My Witch Senpai initially began publication as a webcomic on the author's Pixiv account on March 4, 2018. It later began serialization on Akita Shoten's Champion Cross website on August 30, 2018. The series initially ended on November 19, 2020, but resumed serialization on April 25, 2022. It ended serialization on October 26, 2026. Its chapters have been collected into five tankōbon volumes as of February 2025. The series is licensed in English by Seven Seas Entertainment.

| No. | Original release date | Original ISBN | North American release date | North American ISBN |
|---|---|---|---|---|
| 1 | February 14, 2020 | 978-4-253-27516-3 | January 11, 2022 | 978-1-64827-784-9 |
Encounters 1–24; Bonus: "Kouhai-kun's First Year"
| 2 | January 15, 2021 | 978-4-253-27517-0 | July 12, 2022 | 978-1-63858-167-3 |
Encounters 25–42; Bonus: "Married Couple on a Date"
| 3 | May 16, 2023 | 978-4-253-27514-9 | July 9, 2024 | 979-8-88843-049-1 |
Encounters 43–59; Bonus: "Komachi and Kouhai-kun's Day Off"
| 4 | April 16, 2024 | 978-4-253-27515-6 | February 4, 2025 | 979-8-89373-132-3 |
Encounters 60–75; Bonus: "At the Hot Springs"
| 5 | February 14, 2025 | 978-4-253-27590-3 | November 11, 2025 | 979-8-89561-666-6 |
Encounters 76–89; Bonus

== Reception ==
The series, alongside Kieta Mama Tomo, was ranked 17th in the 2021 edition of Takarajimasha's Kono Manga ga Sugoi! guidebook's list of the best manga for female readers.
