= My Cute Cousin Always Gets Her Way =

Japanese manga series

- First tankōbon volume cover

いとこのこ (Itoko no Ko)
- Genre: Romantic comedy
- Manga
- Written by: Inuchiku
- Published by: Fujimi Shobo
- English publisher: NA: Seven Seas Entertainment
- Imprint: Dragon Comics Age
- Magazine: DraDra Sharp
- Original run: August 4, 2023 – present
- Volumes: 6

My Cute Cousin Always Gets Her Way (いとこのこ, Itoko no Ko) is a Japanese manga series written and illustrated by Inuchiku. It was originally published as a one-shot in Kodansha's shōnen manga magazine Weekly Shōnen Magazine in August 2022. It later began serialization on the KadoComi and Nico Nico Seiga websites under Fujimi Shobo's DraDra Sharp brand in August 2023.

== Synopsis ==
Nozomu spends his summer vacation at his uncle's house in the countryside. While there, he has to deal with the whims of younger cousin, Sou, who frequently teases him.

== Publication ==
Written and illustrated by Inuchiku, My Cute Cousin Always Gets Her Way was originally published as a one-shot in Kodansha's shōnen manga magazine Weekly Shōnen Magazine on August 18, 2022. It later began serialization on Kadokawa Corporation's KadoComi and Nico Nico Seiga websites under Fujimi Shobo's DraDra Sharp brand on August 4, 2023. Its chapters have been collected in six tankōbon volumes as of September 2026. The series is licensed by Seven Seas Entertainment for English publication.

No.	Original release date	Original ISBN	North American release date	North American ISBN
1	May 9, 2024	978-4-04-075425-3	November 11, 2025	979-8-89561-319-1
1. "My Cousin from the Countryside"; 2. "Beach Day"; 3. "The Summer Festival" (part 1); 4. "The Summer Festival" (part 2); 5. "A Boy?"; 6. "Scattered Showers"; 7. "Extended Family" (part 1); 8. "Extended Family" (part 2); 9. "Walking the Dog"; 8.5. "The Weight of Words"; Extra
2	September 9, 2024	978-4-04-075555-7	March 17, 2026	979-8-89561-320-7
10. "Double Trouble"; 11. "Starry Skies"; 12. "A Smartphone for Sou?"; 13. "The Secret Base"; 14. "Heavy Sleepers"; 15. "My Cousin's Friends"; 16. "A Test of Courage" (part 1); 17. "A Test of Courage" (part 2); 10.5. "My Cousin: Some Things Never Change"; 11.5. "Proper Etiquette"; 12.5. "Spring Water"; Extra
3	March 7, 2025	978-4-04-075842-8	July 14, 2026	979-8-89561-920-9
18. "The Old Sou"; 19. "Relationship Counseling"; 20. "One-Sided Feelings"; 21. "Grandpa's Home"; 22. "Just Me & My Cousin"; 23. "Weathering the Storm"; 24. "Hospital Visit" (part 1); 25. "Hospital Visit" (part 2); 26. "Back to School"; 23.5. "My Sister's Plaything"; Extra
4	September 9, 2025	978-4-04-076090-2	December 15, 2026	979-8-89765-990-6
5	March 9, 2026	978-4-04-076322-4	May 11, 2027	979-8-89863-988-4
6	September 9, 2026	978-4-04-076529-7; 978-4-04-076530-3 (SE)	—	—

== Reception ==
The series was nominated for the tenth and eleventh Next Manga Awards in the web category in 2024 and 2025, respectively.
