= Raul and His Vampire Prince =

Japanese manga series

- First tankōbon volume cover

ラウルと吸血鬼 (Rauru to Kyūketsuki)
- Genre: Boy's love; Slice of life; Supernatural
- Manga
- Written by: Ataru Sonoguchi
- Published by: Shogakukan
- English publisher: NA: Seven Seas Entertainment
- Imprint: Sunday GX Comics
- Magazine: Sunday Webry; Monthly Sunday Gene-X; (June 18, 2024 – March 19, 2026)
- Original run: April 18, 2024 – January 16, 2026
- Volumes: 3

Raul and His Vampire Prince (ラウルと吸血鬼, Rauru to Kyūketsuki) is a Japanese manga series written and illustrated by Ataru Sonoguchi. It was originally published as a one-shot on Shogakukan's Sunday Webry website in July 2023. It was later serialized on the same website between April 2024 and January 2026.

== Plot ==
Raul is a young man who was adopted and raised by a youthful effeminate vampire named Rose. Raul seeks to become stronger in order to protect Rose.

== Publication ==
Written and illustrated by Ataru Sonoguchi, Raul and His Vampire Prince was originally published as a one-shot on Shogakukan's Sunday Webry website on July 24, 2023. It was later serialized on the same website from April 18, 2024, to January 16, 2026. It was also serialized in the Monthly Sunday Gene-X magazine from June 18, 2024, to March 19, 2026. Its chapters were compiled into three tankōbon volumes released from October 10, 2024, to February 12, 2026.

In November 2025, Seven Seas Entertainment announced that they had licensed the series for English publication, with the first volume set to release in August 2026.

No.	Original release date	Original ISBN	North American release date	North American ISBN
1	October 10, 2024	978-4-09-853656-6	August 25, 2026	979-8-89765-934-0
Chapters 1–7
2	April 11, 2025	978-4-09-854056-3	November 24, 2026	979-8-89765-935-7
3	February 12, 2026	—	February 23, 2027	979-8-90209-010-6

== Reception ==
The series was ranked 20th in the sixth Sanyodo Bookstore Comic Awards in 2025.
