= The Dragon Knight's Beloved =

Japanese light novel series

- First light novel volume cover

竜騎士のお気に入り (Ryūkishi no Okiniiri)
- Genre: Romantic fantasy
- Light novel
- Written by: Asagi Orikawa
- Illustrated by: Akito Ito
- Published by: Ichijinsha
- Imprint: Ichijinsha Bunko Iris
- Original run: January 20, 2017 – present
- Volumes: 10
- Manga
- Written by: Asagi Orikawa
- Illustrated by: Ritsu Aozaki
- Published by: Ichijinsha
- English publisher: NA: Seven Seas Entertainment
- Imprint: Zero Sum Comics
- Magazine: Monthly Comic Zero Sum
- Original run: January 28, 2019 – present
- Volumes: 11

The Dragon Knight's Beloved (Japanese: 竜騎士のお気に入り, Hepburn: Ryūkishi no Okiniiri) is a Japanese light novel series written by Asagi Orikawa and illustrated by Akito Ito. It began publication under Ichijinsha's Ichijinsha Bunko Iris light novel imprint in January 2017. A manga adaptation illustrated by Ritsu Aozaki began serialization in Ichijinsha's josei manga magazine Monthly Comic Zero Sum in January 2019.

== Synopsis ==
On her 16th birthday, Melissa decided to work as a maid at the royal castle. Her goal is to work at the same place as her idol, Dragon Knight Captain Hubert and the dragons who adore her. Unfortunately for her, she later hears that the Captain is retiring, and she feels like she's failed in achieving her goal. However, the Captain reaches out to Melissa, asking her if she could be his pretend girlfriend.

== Media ==
=== Light novel ===
Written by Asagi Orikawa and illustrated by Akito Ito, The Dragon Knight's Beloved began publication under Ichijinsha's Ichijinsha Bunko Iris light novel imprint on January 20, 2017. Ten volumes have been released as of December 20, 2023.

No.	Title	Release date	ISBN
1	Jijo wa Tadaima Kenmu-chū (侍女はただいま兼務中)	January 20, 2017	978-4-7580-4906-1
2	Jijo wa Negai o Jitsugen-chū (侍女はねがいを実現中)	June 20, 2017	978-4-7580-4961-0
3	Jijo wa Shibaraku Kisei-chū (侍女はしばらく帰省中)	November 20, 2017	978-4-7580-9007-0
4	Futari wa Tabi o Mankitsu-chū (ふたりは旅を満喫中)	May 19, 2018	978-4-7580-9072-8
5	Ryū wa Futari o Shukufuku-chū (竜はふたりを祝福中)	November 20, 2018	978-4-7580-9122-0
6	Futari wa Shimei o Suikō-chū (ふたりは使命を遂行中)	June 20, 2019	978-4-7580-9182-4
7	Okusama wa Hisokana Koi o Ōen-chū (奥様は密かな恋を応援中)	March 19, 2020	978-4-7580-9238-8
8	Okusama wa Ikoku no Sora o Kakushin-chū (奥様は異国の空を革新中)	October 20, 2020	978-4-7580-9305-7
9	Futari wa Shukumei ni Chokumen-chū (ふたりは宿命に直面中)	October 20, 2021	978-4-7580-9383-5
10	Ryū no Inori to Tabidachi no Sora (竜の祈りと旅立ちの空)	December 20, 2023	978-4-7580-9491-7; 978-4-7580-9492-4 (SE)

=== Manga ===
A manga adaptation illustrated by Ritsu Aozaki began serialization in Ichijinsha's josei manga magazine Monthly Comic Zero Sum on January 28, 2019. The manga's chapters have been compiled into eleven tankōbon volumes as of May 2026. The manga adaptation is licensed in English by Seven Seas Entertainment.

No.	Original release date	Original ISBN	North American release date	North American ISBN
1	July 25, 2019	978-4-7580-3453-1	January 11, 2022	978-1-64827-666-8
Chapters 1–6; Bonus: "The Apprentice Maids' Private Conversation"
2	March 25, 2020	978-4-7580-3497-5	March 29, 2022	978-1-63858-150-5
Chapters 7–13; Bonus: "What One Can Do for a Baby Dragon"
3	November 30, 2020	978-4-7580-3566-8	August 23, 2022	978-1-63858-343-1
Chapters 14–21; Bonus: "Hubert and Melissa's Promise"
4	June 28, 2021	978-4-7580-3620-7	January 24, 2023	978-1-63858-792-7
Chapters 22–26; Bonus: "Reminiscences from Louis's Diary"
5	March 31, 2022	978-4-7580-3724-2	June 20, 2023	978-1-68579-613-6
Chapters 27–32; Bonus: "A Dressmaker's Struggles"
6	November 30, 2022	978-4-7580-3820-1	November 21, 2023	978-1-68579-708-9
Chapters 33–38
7	July 31, 2023	978-4-7580-3913-0	June 25, 2024	979-8-88843-795-7
Chapters 39–45
8	March 29, 2024	978-4-7580-8485-7	January 28, 2025	979-8-89160-662-3
Chapters 46–52
9	December 26, 2024	978-4-7580-8631-8	September 9, 2025	979-8-89561-721-2
Chapters 53–58; Bonus
10	October 31, 2025	978-4-7580-8834-3	October 13, 2026	979-8-89765-365-2
Chapters 59–64; Bonus
11	May 29, 2026	978-4-7580-9916-5	—	—

== Reception ==
By December 2023, the series had over 1.8 million copies in circulation.
