= The Oblivious Girl and the Maidenly Man =

Japanese manga series

- First tankōbon volume cover

無自覚ちゃんとオトメな男 (Mujikaku-chan to Otome na Otoko)
- Genre: Romantic comedy
- Manga
- Written by: Rabi
- Published by: No. 9 (digital); Gentosha (print)
- English publisher: NA: Seven Seas Entertainment
- Imprint: Birz Comics
- Magazine: Comic Boost; (February 7, 2025 – present)
- Original run: July 1, 2024 – present
- Volumes: 4

The Oblivious Girl and the Maidenly Man (Japanese: 無自覚ちゃんとオトメな男, Hepburn: Mujikaku-chan to Otome na Otoko) is a Japanese manga series written and illustrated by Rabi. It was originally published as a webcomic on the author's Pixiv account in March 2024. It was later acquired by No. 9 who began serializing chapters on online bookstores in July 2024, with its physical releases handled by Gentosha.

== Synopsis ==
Rintaro is an effeminate man who owns a café. He has a crush on his regular customer Luna. However, Luna has a fear of men, but is comfortable conversing with Rintaro, so she asks for his help to get her used to men. When Luna starts making advances towards Rintaro, Rintaro isn't sure how to restrain his growing feelings for her.

== Publication ==
Written and illustrated by Rabi, The Oblivious Girl and the Maidenly Man was originally published as a webcomic on the author's Pixiv account on March 5, 2024. It was later acquired by No. 9 who began serializing chapters on online bookstores on July 1, 2024. It later began serialization on Gentosha's Comic Boost website on February 7, 2025. The series' chapters have been compiled by Gentosha into four tankōbon volumes as of September 2026.

In October 2025, Seven Seas Entertainment announced that they had licensed the series for English publication, with the first volume set to release in May 2026.

No.	Original release date	Original ISBN	North American release date	North American ISBN
1	February 21, 2025	978-4-344-85552-6	July 28, 2026	979-8-89765-410-9
Chapters 1–10; Bonus
2	July 24, 2025	978-4-344-85611-0	November 10, 2026	979-8-89765-894-7
3	December 24, 2025	978-4-344-85693-6	April 20, 2027	979-8-90209-054-0
4	September 24, 2026	978-4-344-85817-6	—	—

== Reception ==
The series was ranked fifteenth in the web category of the 11th Next Manga Awards in 2025.
