= Welcome to Succubus High! =

Japanese manga series

- First tankōbon volume cover

サキュバス学園の犬ッ!! (Sakyubasu Gakuen no Inutsu!!)
- Genre: Modern fantasy; Supernatural
- Manga
- Written by: Knuckle Curve
- Published by: Takeshobo
- English publisher: NA: Seven Seas Entertainment
- Imprint: Bamboo Comics
- Magazine: Web Comic Gamma Plus
- Original run: October 25, 2018 – June 16, 2023
- Volumes: 6
- icon

Welcome to Succubus High! (Japanese: サキュバス学園の犬ッ!!, Hepburn: Sakyubasu Gakuen no Inutsu!!; "The Dog at Succubus High School") is a Japanese manga series written and illustrated by Knuckle Curve. It was serialized on Takeshobo's Web Comic Gamma Plus website from October 2018 to June 2023.

== Plot ==
Inubou Takeru is transferred to a new high school, but is shocked to find it is an all-girls school and all the students are succubi. Now he struggles to survive with his chastity intact.

== Publication ==
Written and illustrated by Knuckle Curve, Welcome to Succubus High! was serialized on Takeshobo's Web Comic Gamma Plus website from October 25, 2018, to June 16, 2023. Takeshobo has collected its chapters into individual tankōbon volumes. The first volume was released on July 5, 2019. Six volumes were released from July 5, 2019, to August 17, 2023.

In North America, the manga has been licensed for English release by Seven Seas Entertainment and it is released under their Ghost Ship mature imprint.

=== Volumes ===
No.	Original release date	Original ISBN	English release date	English ISBN
1	July 5, 2019	978-4-8019-6673-4	September 29, 2020	978-1-947804-74-6
2	May 29, 2020	978-4-8019-6984-1	January 26, 2021	978-1-947804-77-7
3	February 27, 2021	978-4-8019-7224-7	November 16, 2021	978-1-947804-91-3
4	November 11, 2021	978-4-8019-7511-8	June 13, 2023	978-1-64827-508-1
5	October 17, 2022	978-4-8019-7908-6	December 26, 2023	978-1-63858-334-9
6	August 17, 2023	978-4-8019-8130-0	October 22, 2024	979-8-88843-810-7
