= The Elf Sisters Can't Wait for the Night =

Japanese manga series

- First tankōbon volume cover

四姉妹は夜をおまちかね (Erufu wa Yoru o Omachikane)
- Genre: Romantic comedy; Supernatural
- Manga
- Written by: Kei Hozumi
- Illustrated by: Bcoca
- Published by: Fujimi Shobo
- English publisher: NA: Seven Seas Entertainment
- Imprint: Dragon Comics Age
- Magazine: Monthly Dragon Age
- Original run: September 9, 2021 – present
- Volumes: 8

The Elf Sisters Can't Wait for the Night (四姉妹は夜をおまちかね, Erufu wa Yoru o Omachikane) is a Japanese manga series written by Kei Hozumi and illustrated by Bcoca. It began serialization in Fujimi Shobo's shōnen manga magazine Monthly Dragon Age in September 2021.

== Synopsis ==
Yoake Hashibami is a young man who often plays pranks on four elf sisters. One day, Yoake discovers that his pranks have an effect on the sisters, as their "Queen's Blood" begins to manifest. After the discovery, Yoake is given permission by the sisters' guardian to continue pulling pranks on them.

== Publication ==
Written by Kei Hozumi and illustrated by Bcoca, The Elf Sisters Can't Wait for the Night began serialization in Fujimi Shobo's shōnen manga magazine Monthly Dragon Age on September 9, 2021. Its chapters have been compiled into eight tankōbon volumes as of October 2026. The series is licensed for English publication by Seven Seas Entertainment.

No.	Original release date	Original ISBN	North American release date	North American ISBN
1	February 9, 2022	978-4-04-074435-3	January 28, 2025	979-8-89160-743-9
1. "I Can Prank the Sisters as Much as I Want?"; 2. "First Night with the Sisters"; 3. "She Sucked Me Dry"; 4. "Let's Take It Again from Here"
2	August 9, 2022	978-4-04-074639-5	May 27, 2025	979-8-89160-973-0
5. "Didn't See That Coming"; 6. "Why Do You Want It So Bad?"; 7. "First Feelings"; 8. "Pool Shenanigans with the Four Sisters"; 9. "Wilder than the Imagination"; 10. "A Magic Showdown with the Sisters?!"
3	February 9, 2023	978-4-04-074863-4	November 25, 2025	979-8-89373-376-1
11. "Naratachi's Forest Princess and Tsukiko's True Form"; 12. "Flowers Bloom"; 13. ""Oneechan's" Power"; 14. "Well Beyond a Plank"; 15. "A Shockingly Shocking Shock"; 12.5. "What the Other Three Were up To"
4	August 9, 2023	978-4-04-075067-5	March 10, 2026	979-8-89373-377-8
16. "So Wait, You Mean...?"; 17. "The Queen's Consort"; 18. "This Isn't Just My Problem Anymore"; 15.5. "What Ei Was Doing"; 19. "An Invitation to Sanzashi Hill"; 20. "Before This Night Ends"; 21. "You Won't Get There Unless You Embrace Your Feelings"
5	April 9, 2024	978-4-04-075397-3	July 21, 2026	979-8-89373-760-8
22. "Even If the Trembling Never Stops"; 23. "Role Reversal, and Then..."; 24. "Please, It's Not What You Think"; 25. "I Don't Get It"; 26. "An Earnest Invitation"; 27. "Despite My Feelings"
6	December 9, 2024	978-4-04-075646-2	November 24, 2026	979-8-89561-545-4
7	February 9, 2026	978-4-04-076262-3	March 16, 2027	979-8-90209-043-4
8	October 9, 2026	978-4-04-076586-0	—	—

== Reception ==
By October 2026, the series had over 300,000 copies in circulation.
