= Nemu the Corpse Bearer =

Japanese manga series

- First tankōbon volume cover

死体担ぎのネム (Shitai Katsugi no Nemu)
- Genre: Fantasy
- Manga
- Written by: Tsukamu Yoriwake
- Published by: Shinchosha
- English publisher: NA: Seven Seas Entertainment
- Imprint: Bunch Comics
- Magazine: Kurage Bunch
- Original run: April 1, 2025 – present
- Volumes: 3

Nemu the Corpse Bearer (死体担ぎのネム, Shitai Katsugi no Nemu) is a Japanese manga series written and illustrated by Tsukamu Yoriwake. It began serialization on Shinchosha's Kurage Bunch manga website in April 2025.

== Synopsis ==
Garen is a young adventurer who is looking for his sister who has been missing for over a year. He enters into a dungeon in search of her, but he later picks up an injury and is unable to move. He later has an encounter with a woman named Nemu who works as a corpse bearer. Her job is to traverse terrains in order to retrieve dead bodies. While witnessing her at work, Garen starts to show respect for her work, and decides to tag along with her in order to find his sister.

== Publication ==
Written and illustrated by Tsukamu Yoriwake, Nemu the Corpse Bearer began serialization on Shinchosha's Kurage Bunch manga website on April 1, 2025. Its chapters have been compiled into three tankōbon volumes as of August 2026.

In December 2025, Seven Seas Entertainment announced that they had licensed the manga for English publication, with the first volume set to be released in November 2026.

No.	Original release date	Original ISBN	North American release date	North American ISBN
1	August 7, 2025	978-4-10-772855-5	November 24, 2026	979-8-89863-488-9
2	February 9, 2026	978-4-10-772908-8	March 23, 2027	979-8-89863-995-2
3	August 7, 2026	978-4-10-772968-2	—	—

== Reception ==
The series has been recommended by manga creators Yoshitoki Ōima and Kanehito Yamada.
