= I See You, Aizawa-san! =

Japanese manga series by Dorothy Odoroo

- First tankōbon volume cover

見えてますよ! 愛沢さん (Mietemasu yo! Aizawa-san)
- Genre: Horror; Romantic comedy; Yuri
- Manga
- Written by: Dorothy Odoroo
- Published by: Kill Time Communication
- English publisher: NA: Seven Seas Entertainment
- Imprint: Valkyrie Comics
- Magazine: Comic Valkyrie; (July 4, 2022 – October 8, 2025); KimiComi; (April 16, 2026 – present)
- Original run: July 4, 2022 – present
- Volumes: 6

I See You, Aizawa-san! (Japanese: 見えてますよ! 愛沢さん, Hepburn: Mietemasu yo!, Aizawa-san) is a Japanese manga series written and illustrated by Dorothy Odoroo. It was initially serialized in Kill Time Communication's digital seinen manga magazine Comic Valkyrie from July 2022 to October 2025. After the magazine published its final issue in December 2025, it resumed serialization on the KimiComi manga website in April 2026.

== Synopsis ==
Honami Aizawa, a Japanese high school student and member of the idol group De:LPhinus died recently, but her ghost roams around her classroom and haunts her classmate, Michi Kurotori. Michi has had the ability to see ghosts since her childhood. However, she views her ability as an inconvenience, and tries desperately to ignore Honami's antics.

== Characters ==
Michi Kurotori (黒鳥みち, Kurotori Michi)
Voiced by: Akari Kitō (voice comic)
Honami Aizawa (愛沢ほなみ, Aizawa Honami)
Kasumi Namoto (名本かすみ, Namoto Kasumi)

== Media ==
=== Manga ===
Written and illustrated by Dorothy Odoroo, I See You, Aizawa-san! was initially serialized on Kill Time Communication's digital seinen manga magazine Comic Valkyrie from July 4, 2022, to October 8, 2025. After the magazine published its final issue on December 15, 2025, the series resumed serialization on the KimiComi manga website on April 16, 2026. Its chapters have been compiled into six tankōbon volumes as of November 2026.

During their panel at Anime Expo 2026, Seven Seas Entertainment announced that they had licensed the series for English publication, with the first volume set to release in March 2027.

No.	Original release date	Original ISBN	English release date	English ISBN
1	March 8, 2023	978-4-79921-748-1	March 30, 2027	979-8-90209-667-2
2	November 8, 2023	978-4-79921-837-2	—	—
3	July 8, 2024	978-4-79921-924-9	—	—
4	March 7, 2025	978-4-79922-018-4	—	—
5	February 6, 2026	978-4-79922-135-8	—	—
6	November 6, 2026	978-4-79922-236-2	—	—

=== Other ===
A voice comic adaptation was uploaded to the Comic Valkyrie YouTube channel on March 8, 2023. It featured voice acting from Akari Kitō.

== Reception ==
The series was nominated for the twelfth Next Manga Award in 2026 in the web category.
