= My Girlfriend Cheated on Me, and Now My Flirty Underclassman Won't Leave Me Alone! =

Japanese light novel series

- First light novel volume cover

カノジョに浮気されていた俺が、小悪魔な後輩に懐かれています (Kanojo ni Uwakisareteita Ore ga, Koakuma na Kōhai ni Natsukareteimasu)
- Genre: Romantic comedy
- Novel series
- Written by: Yū Omiya
- Published by: Shōsetsuka ni Narō; Kakuyomu
- Original run: December 23, 2017 – December 7, 2021
- Light novel
- Written by: Yū Omiya
- Illustrated by: Eeru
- Published by: Kadokawa Shoten
- English publisher: NA: Seven Seas Entertainment
- Imprint: Kadokawa Sneaker Bunko
- Original run: December 1, 2019 – October 1, 2024
- Volumes: 8 + 1
- Manga
- Written by: Yū Omiya
- Illustrated by: Yōhei Kazawa
- Published by: Kadokawa Shoten
- English publisher: NA: Seven Seas Entertainment
- Imprint: Kadokawa Comics A
- Magazine: Shōnen Ace Plus
- Original run: November 26, 2021 – present
- Volumes: 6

My Girlfriend Cheated on Me, and Now My Flirty Underclassman Won't Leave Me Alone! (カノジョに浮気されていた俺が、小悪魔な後輩に懐かれています, Kanojo ni Uwakisareteita Ore ga, Koakuma na Kōhai ni Natsukareteimasu) is a Japanese light novel series written by Yū Omiya and illustrated by Eeru. It was originally serialized as a web novel on the websites Shōsetsuka ni Narō and Kakuyomu from December 2017 to December 2021. It was later published by Kadokawa Shoten under their Kadokawa Sneaker Bunko imprint, with eight volumes being published between December 2019 and November 2023; an additional volume was released digitally in October 2024. A manga adaptation illustrated by Yōhei Kazawa began serialization in November 2021, and has been compiled into six tankōbon volumes as of August 2025.

== Plot ==
The series follows Yūta Hasegawa, a university student who recently broke up with his girlfriend after she cheated on him. Feeling alone as Christmas approached, he encounters Mayu Shinohara, who is wearing a Santa costume. Feeling a connection, he and Mayu start to hang out.

== Characters ==
Yūta Hasegawa (羽瀬川 悠太, Hasegawa Yūta)
Voiced by: Wataru Katoh (voice comic)
A second-year university student who recently broke up with his girlfriend. He is a basketball player and belongs to a circle of friends named "Start".
Mayu Shinohara (志乃原 真由, Shinohara Mayu)
Voiced by: Konomi Inagaki (voice comic)
A first-year university student who goes to the same school as Yūta. He initially encountered her on Christmas Eve as she was distributing flyers while wearing a Santa costume. They form a relationship and she frequently visits his place.
Ayaka Mino (美濃 彩華, Mino Ayaka)
Voiced by: Yurika Moriyama
Yūta's friend and a second-year university student at their school.
Reina Aisaka (相坂 礼奈, Aisaka Reina)
Yūta's ex-girlfriend, who broke up with him shortly before Christmas.

== Publication ==
=== Light novel ===
The series is written by Yū Omiya, who originally posted it as a web novel on the websites Shōsetsuka ni Narō and Kakuyomu from December 23, 2017 to December 7, 2021. Kadokawa Shoten later began publishing it as a light novel series with illustrations by Eeru under their Kadokawa Sneaker Bunko imprint, releasing eight volumes between December 1, 2019 and November 1, 2023. An additional volume featuring an epilogue and side stories was released digitally on October 1, 2024. The novels are licensed in English by Seven Seas Entertainment.

No.	Original release date	Original ISBN	English release date	English ISBN
1	December 1, 2019	978-4-04-108799-2	February 26, 2026 (digital); March 24, 2026 (print)	979-8-89765-167-2
2	May 1, 2020	978-4-04-108804-3	June 11, 2026 (digital); July 21, 2026 (print)	979-8-89765-168-9
3	November 1, 2020	978-4-04-110867-3	November 10, 2026 (print)	979-8-89765-169-6
4	June 1, 2021	978-4-04-111217-5	—	—
5	December 1, 2021	978-4-04-111862-7	—	—
6	April 28, 2022	978-4-04-112300-3	—	—
7	December 1, 2022	978-4-04-113087-2	—	—
8	November 1, 2023	978-4-04-113733-8	—	—
AF	October 1, 2024	—	—	—

=== Manga ===
A manga adaptation illustrated by Yōhei Kazawa began serialization on the ComicWalker and Niconico Seiga services under Kadokawa Shoten's Shōnen Ace Plus brand on November 26, 2021, with the series being compiled into six tankōbon volumes as of August 2025. A voiced comic video of the series was posted on YouTube in December 2022. The manga is also licensed in English by Seven Seas Entertainment.

No.	Original release date	Original ISBN	English release date	English ISBN
1	June 24, 2022	978-4-04-112722-3	December 15, 2026	979-8-89765-461-1
2	December 26, 2022	978-4-04-112726-1	—	—
3	July 25, 2023	978-4-04-113919-6	—	—
4	January 26, 2024	978-4-04-114551-7	—	—
5	August 26, 2024	978-4-04-115294-2	—	—
6	August 26, 2025	978-4-04-116228-6	—	—

== Reception ==
In September 2024, Omiya reported on his personal Twitter account that the series had sold over 400,000 copies.
