= Nakamura-san, the Uninvited Gyaru =

Japanese manga series

- First tankōbon volume cover, featuring Karin Nakamura

押しかけギャルの中村さん (Oshikake Gyaru no Nakamura-san)
- Genre: Romantic comedy; Slice of life
- Manga
- Written by: Sachiko Orihara
- Published by: Futabasha
- English publisher: NA: Seven Seas Entertainment
- Imprint: Action Comics
- Magazine: Manga Town; (July 5, 2021 – December 5, 2023); Web Comic Action; (January 12, 2024 – present)
- Original run: July 5, 2021 – present
- Volumes: 9

Nakamura-san, the Uninvited Gyaru (押しかけギャルの中村さん, Oshikake Gyaru no Nakamura-san) is a Japanese manga series written and illustrated by Sachiko Orihara. It began serialization in Futabasha's Manga Town magazine in July 2021. After the magazine published its last issue in December 2023, the series was transferred to the Web Comic Action manga website in January 2024.

== Plot ==
Teppei Akiyama is a 20-year-old otaku working at a bar who easily get flustered. Following a frustrating day, he almost gets hit by a car until he is saved by Karin Nakamura, his gyaru coworker. She then asks if she can live with him at his apartment as a favor. While displaying an outgoing personality, Nakamura becomes flustered when she is by herself. Akiyama and Nakamura find themselves dealing with this sudden and unexpected cohabitation.

== Publication ==
Written and illustrated by Sachiko Orihara, Nakamura-san, the Uninvited Gyaru began serialization in Futabasha's Manga Town magazine on July 5, 2021. After the magazine published its final issue on December 5, 2023, the series was transferred to the Web Comic Action website on January 12, 2024. Its chapters have been compiled into nine tankōbon volumes as of October 2026. The series is licensed in English by Seven Seas Entertainment.

No.	Original release date	Original ISBN	North American release date	North American ISBN
1	September 12, 2022	978-4-575-85755-9	October 22, 2024	979-8-89160-502-2
Chapters 1–13; Extra (おまけマンガ – 描き下ろし –, Omake Manga – Kakioroshi –)
2	June 12, 2023	978-4-575-85849-5	February 18, 2025	979-8-89160-747-7
Chapters 14–24; Extra (おまけマンガ – 描き下ろし –, Omake Manga – Kakioroshi –)
3	February 8, 2024	978-4-575-85934-8	June 17, 2025	979-8-89160-986-0
Chapters 25–35; Extra (おまけマンガ – 描き下ろし –, Omake Manga – Kakioroshi –)
4	August 8, 2024	978-4-575-85993-5	November 4, 2025	979-8-89373-815-5
Chapters 36–44; Extra (おまけマンガ – 描き下ろし –, Omake Manga – Kakioroshi –); Gyaru and Fashion (ギャルとファッション, Gyaru to Fasshon)
5	January 9, 2025	978-4-575-86044-3	March 31, 2026	979-8-89561-774-8
Chapters 45–53; Extra (おまけマンガ – 描き下ろし –, Omake Manga – Kakioroshi –)
6	July 24, 2025	978-4-575-86118-1	August 25, 2026	979-8-89765-929-6
Chapters 54–62; Extra (おまけマンガ – 描き下ろし –, Omake Manga – Kakioroshi –)
7	December 11, 2025	978-4-575-86170-9	January 19, 2027	979-8-89863-217-5
Chapters 63–71; Extra (おまけマンガ – 描き下ろし –, Omake Manga – Kakioroshi –)
8	May 14, 2026	978-4-575-86223-2	—	—
Chapters 72–80; Extra (おまけマンガ – 描き下ろし –, Omake Manga – Kakioroshi –)
9	October 8, 2026	978-4-575-86277-5	—	—
Chapters 81–89; Extra (おまけマンガ – 描き下ろし –, Omake Manga – Kakioroshi –)
