= Eve and Eve =

Japanese manga series

- tankōbon volume cover

イヴとイヴ (Eve to Eve)
- Genre: Sci-Fi; Yuri; Erotica
- Manga
- Written by: Nagashiro Rouge
- Published by: Ichijinsha
- English publisher: NA: Seven Seas Entertainment
- Magazine: Comic Yuri Hime
- Original run: April 16, 2016 – March 17, 2018
- Volumes: 1

Eve and Eve (Japanese: イヴとイヴ) is a Japanese yuri manga anthology written and illustrated by Nagashiro Rouge. It was first published as individual one-shots in Ichijinsha's Comic Yuri Hime and Kill Time Communications's Yuri Pregnancies anthology series from April 2016, to March 2018, before being collected into a single tankōbon volume by Ichijinsha in 2018. It was licensed for an English-language release by Seven Seas Entertainment.

== Publication ==
Written and illustrated by Nagashiro Rouge, Eve and Eve was published as individual one-shots in Ichijinsha's Comic Yuri Hime and Kill Time Communications's Yuri Pregnancies anthology series from April 2016, to March 2018, before being collected into a single tankōbon volume by Ichijinsha in 2018.

The series was licensed for an English release in North America by Seven Seas Entertainment, but is now listed as part of their past releases that are permanently out of print.

No.	Original release date	Original ISBN	English release date	English ISBN
1	July 18, 2018	978-4-7580-7845-0	May 28, 2019	978-1-642753-31-8
1. "I Want to Leave Behind a Miraculous Love" (from Yuri Pregnancies 2); 2. "The Case of Eko and Lisa" (from Comic Yuri Hime Oct. 2017); 3. "Top or Bottom? The Showdown!" (from Comic Yuri Hime Nov. 2017); 4. "An Infidelity Revisited" (from Comic Yuri Hime Jan. 2018); 5. "Heir to the Curse" (from Yuri Pregnancies); 6. "Eternity 1 and 2: Eve and Eve" (from Comic Yuri Hime May 2018); 7. "Eve and Eve: Epilogue"

== Reception ==
The series has received positive reviews. Rebecca Silverman for Anime News Network gave Eve and Eve an overall B+ rating; remarking that it was "thoughtful in its plots and not always comfortable in its romances, two elements which are definitely connected." Erica Friedman of Yuricon gave the first volume and overall 8 rating, noting that while she was not interested in the collection's stories featuring pregnancy, she did appreciate the science fiction elements and enjoyed the story “Top or Bottom: Showdown.”
