= Killing Stalking =

2016–2019 manhwa by Koogi

- Cover of the first comic volume (Italian edition)

킬링 스토킹 RR: Killing seutoking MR: K'illing sŭt'ok'ing
- Genre: Boys' Love, Yaoi, Drama, Horror, Psychological Horror
- Author: Koogi
- Original run: March 3, 2016 – March 22, 2019
- Volumes: 8 (Korea)

Killing Stalking (Korean: 킬링 스토킹) is a South Korean manhwa written and illustrated by Koogi. It was published online in Korean and English by Lezhin Comics and won the ₩100,000,000 Grand Prize Award at the Second Lezhin World Comics Contest.

The series has been licensed in English in print format by Seven Seas Entertainment. A live action television adaptation of the series was announced on February 24, 2022.

== Plot ==
The story follows Yoon Bum, a young mentally ill man with a difficult past. After becoming infatuated with Oh Sangwoo, a peer from his time in the South Korean military who saved him from a rape attempt, he decides to break into Sangwoo's home while he is out. Eventually getting in, Bum finds a tied up and bruised woman in Sangwoo's basement. He is discovered by Sangwoo, who breaks his legs and keeps him captive, eventually trapping him in an abusive and manipulative relationship as he grows Stockholm syndrome.

== Characters ==
- Yoon Bum (윤범)

Yoon Bum is the main character of Killing Stalking. Due to his parents dying when he was little, Yoon Bum grew up a victim to his uncle's abuse. Along with struggling in the military and school, Bum grew up struggling with poor coping mechanisms. He developed crushes easily, as the thought that anyone could care about him at all was so foreign. He'd fall deeply for those who did show him care, and never forget them when they inevitably abandoned or hurt him. Hence, why he ended up breaking into Sangwoo's house at the beginning of the story.

- Oh Sangwoo (오상우)

Oh Sangwoo is the second main character of Killing Stalking. Behind his kind public facade, he is a cruel killer. Severe childhood trauma shaped him into a violent man, feeling nearly no interest in anyone other than himself and Yoon Bum (and even that is up for debate). He appears to be a narcissist and sociopath, not caring for others but himself and only showing that care when it benefits him. Ever since his first killings, rape, torture, and murder just seem to be a pastime for him.

- Yang Seungbae (양승배)

Yang Seungbae is a former investigator who has been demoted to patrolling police officer. Dutiful and prone to skepticism, he often second-guesses others' conclusions. These traits prove to be detrimental, as they cost him his position on the investigation team.
