= Box of Light =

Japanese manga series

- First tankōbon volume cover

光の箱 (Hikari no Hako)
- Genre: Drama; Mystery; Supernatural
- Manga
- Written by: Seiko Erisawa
- Published by: Shogakukan
- English publisher: NA: Seven Seas Entertainment
- Imprint: Flower Comics
- Magazine: Zōkan Flowers
- Original run: November 14, 2018 – present
- Volumes: 4

Box of Light (光の箱, Hikari no Hako) is a Japanese manga series written and illustrated by Seiko Erisawa. It began serialization in Shogakukan's josei manga magazine Zōkan Flowers in November 2018.

== Synopsis ==
The series is set in a mysterious convenience store that is connected to the supernatural, and is centered around the customers who visit this store trying to make their "final purchase".

== Publication ==
Written and illustrated by Seiko Erisawa, Box of Light began serialization in Shogakukan's josei manga magazine Zōkan Flowers on November 14, 2018. The series' chapters have been compiled into four tankōbon volumes as of March 2025.

In October 2021, Seven Seas Entertainment announced that they had licensed the series for English publication.

No.	Original release date	Original ISBN	North American release date	North American ISBN
1	July 10, 2020	978-4-09-167093-9	July 19, 2022	978-1-63858-521-3
1. "Workaholic Misaki"; 2. "Indecisive Yuuto"; 3. "Three-Shift Kokura"; 4. "Tahini and Humans"; 5. "Akari"; 6. "Kozakura's Wages"
2	March 10, 2022	978-4-09-167098-4	March 28, 2023	978-1-64827-889-1
7. "Chirping"; 8. "Frozen"; 9. "Heartbreak"; 10. "How She Became the Manager"; 11. "Motoha and the Locker"
3	November 9, 2023	978-4-09-167114-1	December 31, 2024	979-8-89160-517-6
12. "Pickup"; 13. "Rescue"; 14. "Kishu Nanko Ume"; 15. "Reminder"; 16. "Ribbons"
4	March 10, 2025	978-4-09-167118-9	December 30, 2025	979-8-89561-658-1
17. "Fragrance-Free"; 18. "Late-Night Broadcast"; 19. "Mineral Water"; 20. "Drive"; Side story: "Christmas Evil"

== Reception ==
The series ranked eighteenth in Freestyle magazine's "The Best 2021 Kono Manga wo Yome!" ranking in 2020. The series, alongside Hajimete no Hito was ranked nineteenth in the 2021 edition of Takarajimasha's Kono Manga ga Sugoi! guidebook's ranking of the best manga for female readers.
