= The Journey of a Dark Elf with Fading Powers =

Japanese manga series

- First tankōbon volume cover

魔力枯れのダークエルフ (Maryoku Kare no Dāruku Erufu)
- Genre: Fantasy
- Manga
- Written by: Daisuke Itabashi
- Published by: Kodansha
- English publisher: NA: Seven Seas Entertainment
- Imprint: Young Magazine KC
- Magazine: Monthly Young Magazine
- Original run: December 17, 2025 – present
- Volumes: 2

The Journey of a Dark Elf with Fading Powers (Japanese: 魔力枯れのダークエルフ, Hepburn: Maryoku Kare no Dāruku Erufu) is a Japanese manga series written and illustrated by Daisuke Itabashi. It was initially published as a one-shot in the Young Magazine USA special edition of Kodansha's seinen manga magazine Weekly Young Magazine in August 2025. It later began serialization in Monthly Young Magazine in December 2025.

== Synopsis ==
Amira was once a powerful magician known as the "omnipotent caster", but then her powers started fading. Afterwards, Amira focuses on how to live her new life without her powers.

== Publication ==
Written and illustrated by Daisuke Itabashi, The Journey of a Dark Elf with Fading Powers was initially published as a one-shot in the Young Magazine USA special edition of Kodansha's seinen manga magazine Weekly Young Magazine on August 21, 2025. It later began serialization in Monthly Young Magazine on December 17, 2025. Its chapters have been compiled into two tankōbon volumes as of September 2026.

The series' chapters are simultaneously published in English on Kodansha's K Manga app. During their panel at Anime Expo 2026, Seven Seas Entertainment announced that they had licensed the series for English publication, with the first volume set to release in March 2027.

| No. | Original release date | Original ISBN | North American release date | North American ISBN |
|---|---|---|---|---|
| 1 | May 20, 2026 | 978-4-06-543013-2 | March 23, 2027 | 979-8-90209-666-5 |
| 2 | September 17, 2026 | 978-4-06-544835-9 | — | — |

== Reception ==
The series was nominated for the twelfth Next Manga Award in 2026 in the print category.
