= Destiny Lovers =

Japanese manga series

- First tankōbon volume cover, featuring Sayaka Ibu

デスラバ (Desuraba)
- Genre: Erotic thriller, mystery
- Manga
- Written by: Kazutaka
- Illustrated by: Kai Tomohiro
- Published by: Kodansha
- English publisher: NA: Seven Seas Entertainment
- Imprint: Shōnen Magazine Comics
- Magazine: Magazine Pocket
- Original run: February 10, 2018 – April 18, 2020
- Volumes: 8
- Manga
- Written by: Kazutaka
- Illustrated by: Kai Tomohiro
- Published by: Kodansha
- Imprint: Shōnen Magazine Comics
- Magazine: Magazine Pocket
- Original run: April 18, 2020 – December 9, 2023
- Volumes: 15
- icon

Destiny Lovers (Japanese: デスラバ, Hepburn: Desu Raba) is a Japanese web manga series written by Kazutaka and illustrated by Kai Tomohiro. It was serialized on Kodansha's Magazine Pocket online magazine from February 2018 to April 2020, with its chapters collected in eight tankōbon volumes. A sequel, also titled Destiny Lovers, was serialized on Magazine Pocket from April 2020 to December 2023, with its chapters collected in fifteen tankōbon volumes. In North America, the first manga series has been licensed for English language release by Seven Seas Entertainment.

== Premise ==
High school student Kosuke Fujishiro is abducted and put into a prison run by women who intend to take away his virginity. However, Kosuke refuses, as he has pledged to be faithful to his childhood friend Sayaka. He and the other men there must survive by not giving into the seductions and temptations, or they will be killed. To further complicate things, the person in charge of the seduction team is Sayaka, who tells Kosuke to keep resisting.

== Publication ==
Destiny Lovers is written by Kazutaka and illustrated by Kai Tomohiro. It was serialized on Kodansha's Magazine Pocket online magazine from February 10, 2018, to April 18, 2020. Kodansha collected its chapters in eight tankōbon volumes, released from June 8, 2018, to August 5, 2020.

In North America, the manga is licensed for English language release by Seven Seas Entertainment, being published under its Ghost Ship imprint for mature readers.

A sequel, also titled Destiny Lovers but written Desutinī Rabāzu (デスティニーラバーズ), was serialized on Magazine Pocket from April 18, 2020, to December 9, 2023. It serves as the original manga's last arc. Kodansha collected its chapters in fifteen tankōbon volumes, released from August 5, 2020, to January 9, 2024.

=== Volumes ===
==== 1st series ====
No.	Original release date	Original ISBN	English release date	English ISBN
1	June 8, 2018	978-4-06-511590-9	December 17, 2019	978-1-947804-66-1
2	September 7, 2018	978-4-06-512320-1	February 25, 2020	978-1-947804-68-5
3	November 6, 2018	978-4-06-513394-1	August 25, 2020	978-1-947804-75-3
4	March 6, 2019	978-4-06-514425-1	October 27, 2020	978-1-947804-76-0
5	July 5, 2019	978-4-06-515693-3	January 26, 2021	978-1-947804-81-4
6	November 6, 2019	978-4-06-517300-8	April 27, 2021	978-1-947804-90-6
7	March 6, 2020	978-4-06-518458-5	August 17, 2021	978-1-638580-39-3
8	August 5, 2020	978-4-06-520445-0	November 9, 2021	978-1-64827-504-3

==== 2nd series ====
No.	Release date	ISBN
1	August 5, 2020	978-4-06-520446-7
2	November 6, 2020	978-4-06-521267-7
3	February 5, 2021	978-4-06-522347-5
4	May 6, 2021	978-4-06-523157-9
5	July 6, 2021	978-4-06-524011-3
6	September 6, 2021	978-4-06-524821-8
7	December 6, 2021	978-4-06-526291-7
8	March 4, 2022	978-4-06-526912-1
9	June 6, 2022	978-4-06-528160-4
10	September 6, 2022	978-4-06-529145-0
11	January 6, 2023	978-4-06-530902-5
12	June 6, 2023	978-4-06-531868-3
13	September 6, 2023	978-4-06-532880-4
14	January 9, 2024	978-4-06-533939-8
15	January 9, 2024	978-4-06-534167-4
