= The Obsessed Mage and His Beloved Statue Bride =

Japanese light novel

- The Obsessed Mage and His Beloved Statue Bride: She Cannot Resist His Seductive Voice
- Light novel volume cover

ヤンデレ魔法使いは石像の乙女しか愛せない 魔女は愛弟子の熱い口づけでとける (Yandere Mahōtsukai wa Sekizō no Otome Shika Aisenai: Majo wa Manadeshi no Atsui Kuchiduke de Tokeru)
- Genre: Romantic fantasy
- Light novel
- Written by: Crane
- Illustrated by: Hachi Uehara
- Published by: Takeshobo
- English publisher: NA: Seven Seas Entertainment
- Imprint: Mitsuneko Bunko
- Published: February 22, 2021
- Volumes: 1
- Manga
- Written by: Crane
- Illustrated by: Sekimori
- Published by: Takeshobo
- English publisher: NA: Seven Seas Entertainment
- Magazine: Hana Neko
- Original run: February 1, 2022 – October 1, 2024
- Volumes: 5
- icon

The Obsessed Mage and His Beloved Statue Bride: She Cannot Resist His Seductive Voice (ヤンデレ魔法使いは石像の乙女しか愛せない 魔女は愛弟子の熱い口づけでとける, Yandere Mahōtsukai wa Sekizō no Otome Shika Aisenai: Majo wa Manadeshi no Atsui Kuchiduke de Tokeru) is a Japanese light novel written by Crane and illustrated by Hachi Uehara. It was published under Takeshobo's Mitsuneko Bunko imprint in February 2021. A manga adaptation illustrated by Sekimori was serialized on NTT Solmare's Comic CMoa website under Takeshobo's Hana Neko brand between February 2022 to October 2024.

== Plot ==
Lara is a powerful mage, and her twelve-year-old apprentice Alistair is intent on proposing marriage to her. One day, Lara casts a spell that turns herself into stone in order to protect Alistair from a dangerous monster, and she awakens twenty years later to find that Alistair has grown in her absence and remains obsessed with her.

== Media ==
=== Light novel ===
Written by Crane and illustrated by Hachi Uehara, The Obsessed Mage and His Beloved Statue Bride: She Cannot Resist His Seductive Voice was published under Takeshobo's Mitsuneko Bunko light novel imprint on February 22, 2021. The light novel is licensed for English publication by Seven Seas Entertainment.

No.	Original release date	Original ISBN	North American release date	North American ISBN
1	February 22, 2021	978-4-80-192555-7	December 17, 2024	979-8-89160-737-8
1. Prologue: "Mage in the Dragon's Belly"; 2. Chapter 1: "Maiden of Stone"; 3. Chapter 2: "The Mage's Disciple"; 4. Chapter 3: "How (Not) to Raise an Evil Sorcerer"; 5. Chapter 4: "Spellbound"; 6. Chapter 5: "The Maiden's Surrender"; 7. Chapter 6: "True Love's Kiss"; 8. Epilogue: "Love in the Mage's Belly"

=== Manga ===
A manga adaptation illustrated by Sekimori was serialized on NTT Solmare's Comic CMoa website under Takeshobo's Hana Neko brand between February 1, 2022, and October 1, 2024. Its chapters were collected in five tankōbon volumes released from November 29, 2024, to August 1, 2025.

In October 2025, Seven Seas Entertainment announced that they had also licensed the manga adaptation for English publication, with the first volume set to release in September 2026.

No.	Original release date	Original ISBN	North American release date	North American ISBN
1	November 29, 2024	978-4-80-194238-7	September 1, 2026	979-8-89863-097-3
Chapters 1–6; Bonus
2	May 1, 2025	978-4-80-194444-2	January 5, 2027	979-8-89863-098-0
3	May 30, 2025	978-4-80-194493-0	May 4, 2027	979-8-89863-099-7
4	July 1, 2025	978-4-80-194531-9	—	—
5	August 1, 2025	978-4-80-194572-2	—	—

== Reception ==
The manga adaptation, alongside The Simple Life of an Ex-Villainess (With a Fluffy Friend?!), won the Isekai Comic Prize at NTT Solmare's Digital Comic Awards in 2023.
