= Beasts of Abigaile =

Shōjo manga series

- Cover of first volume

薔薇監獄の獣たち (Bara Kangoku no Kemono-tachi)
- Genre: Romantic fantasy
- Manga
- Written by: Spica Aoki
- Published by: Akita Shoten
- English publisher: NA: Seven Seas Entertainment
- Magazine: Princess
- Original run: June 2016 – April 2018
- Volumes: 4

Beasts of Abigaile (Japanese: 薔薇監獄の獣たち, Hepburn: Bara Kangoku no Kemono-tachi) is a shōjo manga series by Spica Aoki. The plot centers around a high school student named Nina Tsukishiro, who moves to the European nation of Ruberia and quickly becomes involved with the native luga (wolf people) of the region which have been imprisoned in the island fortress of Abigaile. Beasts of Abigaile appeared as a serial in the monthly manga magazine Princess starting in 2015. Akita Shoten has published the chapters in four bound volumes, and American publishing company Seven Seas Entertainment licensed the series for an English-language translation in North America. A German translation has been published by Tokyopop from June 2017 to November 2018. The English-language translated series has received generally positive reception, though readers note that the manga appears to have a rushed ending, which the author confirmed in an addendum of Volume 4. The German translation had a mixed reception, being criticised for a predictable and at times nonsensical plot, but praised for being fast-paced, well-drawn and enjoyable overall.

== Plot ==
Nina Tsukishiro is a teenage girl who travels to the European country of Ruberia with her uncle. For hundreds of years, Ruberia has enslaved and taken advantage of the native wolf people known as luga for their ability to seek out the best of the country's prized roses, keeping them trapped in the castle of Abigaile. An escaped "alpha" luga, Roy, bites Nina, which transforms her into a luga, after which she is taken away to Abigaile and forced into a chaotic world with rules of dominance and hierarchy she does not understand.

Though her appearance is that of a luga, Nina struggles to fit in, as her scent is that of a human. She comes to discover more about the truth of Abigaile, and herself, as she makes her way through the prison's hierarchy of Alphas and Omegas.

== Publication ==
Volume	Japanese release date	Japanese ISBN	English release date	English ISBN	German release date	German ISBN
1	June 16, 2016	978-4-253-27301-5	June 27, 2017	978-1-626925-35-9	June 31, 2017	978-3-8420-3902-5
2	November 11, 2016	978-4-253-27302-2	October 17, 2017	978-1-626925-67-0	November 6, 2017	978-3-8420-3903-2
3	March 16, 2017	978-4-253-27303-9	March 6, 2018	978-1-626927-11-7	February 1, 2018	978-3-8420-4183-7
4	April 16, 2018	978-4-253-27304-6	November 20, 2018	978-1-626928-56-5	November 8, 2018	978-3-8420-4901-7

== Reception ==
The English-language adaptation of Beasts of Abigaile has received several recommendations: Rebecca Silverman from Anime News Network gave the first 2 volumes an overall "B+" rating, praising the art which "occasionally makes references to the shoujo of the 70s and 80s" and the story's twists on the classic themes of Little Red Riding Hood. Che Gilson of Otaku USA remarks that the elements of the manga "combine to form a perfectly winning shojo fantasy", though the first volume's rapid pacing received some criticism, which has been reflected in reviews of the German-language translations.
