= They Are Still Being Shaken This Morning =

Japanese manga series

- First tankōbon volume cover

今朝も揺られてます (Kesa mo Yuraretemasu)
- Genre: Romantic comedy
- Manga
- Written by: Eiji Masuda
- Published by: Akita Shoten
- English publisher: NA: Seven Seas Entertainment
- Imprint: Shōnen Champion Comics
- Magazine: Bessatsu Shōnen Champion
- Original run: February 9, 2024 – present
- Volumes: 5
- icon

They Are Still Being Shaken This Morning (Japanese: 今朝も揺られてます, Hepburn: Kesa mo Yuraretemasu) is a Japanese manga series written and illustrated by Eiji Masuda. It began serialization in Akita Shoten's shōnen manga magazine Bessatsu Shōnen Champion in February 2024.

== Synopsis ==
The series is centered around two students from different schools going on a train, seemingly developing feelings for each other, and the three particular onlookers on the same train rooting for the couple to be together. All the while the onlookers (composing of a university student, an office lady and an office manager) bond over their shared shipping through texting in a group chat. Throughout the series, the relationship between the two students develops as they are supported or indirectly (and hilariously) challenged by the appearance of their friends and schoolmates, as well as other passengers on the train.

== Characters ==
Hoshino Hikoichi
A high school student in the school near Sakuranomiya Station. He wants to get to know Nayu better.
Himeori Nayu
A high school student in the next school near the train station following Sakuranomiya. She is also interested in Hikoichi, but cannot express her feelings.
Manager
A middle-aged business manager and one of the three onlookers who ships Nayu and Hikoichi. He is part of a group chat with University Student and Office Lady, where they frequently discuss the relationship between Nayu and Hikoichi. Sometimes, he and the other two onlookers take actions in the background to help bring Hikoichi closer to Nayu.
University Student
A university student and one of the three onlookers who ships Nayu and Hikoichi. He is part of a group chat with Manager and Office Lady, where they frequently discuss the relationship between Nayu and Hikoichi. Sometimes, he and the other two onlookers take actions in the background to help bring Hikoichi closer to Nayu.
Office Lady
A young office lady and one of the three onlookers who ships Nayu and Hikoichi. She is part of a group chat with Manager and University Student, where they frequently discuss the relationship between Nayu and Hikoichi. Sometimes, she and the other two onlookers take actions in the background to help bring Hikoichi closer to Nayu.
Ganshin Guy
A friendly middle-aged man who is a fan of the game Ganshin. While he frequently (and unknowingly) interrupts Hikoichi and Nayu's interactions, these interruptions usually end up serving to develop their relationship.
Kirishima
Hikoichi's best friend and classmate. He has a large amount of dating experience, leading to Hikoichi frequently asking him for advice on how to get closer to Nayu. He works together with Himari on occasions to bring Hikoichi closer to Nayu.
Himari
Nayu's best friend and classmate. A bubbly and cheerful girl, she knows about Nayu's crush on Hikoichi, and frequently thinks of ways she can bring the two closer together. He works together with Kirishima on occasions to bring Nayu closer to Hikoichi.
Sakurai
An energetic and straightforward schoolmate of Nayu's. He is dating a friend of hers named Shizuku.
Yaa-Bo
Hikoichi and Kirishima's friend and classmate. He is looking for a girlfriend, but has no luck so far.
Mase
An elementary school girl and Okute's friend who often talks with her about love and relationships despite their age. Their "love talks" often influences Hikoichi and Nayu's decisions in their relationship.
Okute
An elementary school girl and Mase's friend who often talks with her about love and relationships despite their age. Their "love talks" often influences Hikoichi and Nayu's decisions in their relationship.
Lone-Wolf
A young salaryman and the fourth onlooker who ships Nayu and Hikoichi. He decided not to join the group chat with Manager, University Student, and Office Lady when they invited him, because he prefers to observe the relationship between Nayu and Hikoichi at his own pace, but is willing to work together with them on occasions. Because of this, the other three onlookers gave him the nickname "Lone-Wolf".

== Publication ==
Written and illustrated by Eiji Masuda, They Are Still Being Shaken This Morning began serialization in Akita Shoten's shōnen manga magazine Bessatsu Shōnen Champion on February 9, 2024. Its chapters have been compiled into five tankōbon volumes as of September 2026.

In June 2025, Seven Seas Entertainment announced that they had licensed the series for English publication beginning in April 2026.

No.	Original release date	Original ISBN	North American release date	North American ISBN
1	September 6, 2024	978-4-253-29661-8	March 3, 2026	979-8-89561-998-8
1. "I'm Still Cheering You On This Morning"; 2. "I'm Still Overthinking This Morning"; 3. "I'm Still Nodding Off This Morning"; 4. "I'm Still Pretty Pumped This Morning"; 5. "It Still Smells Like Breakfast This Morning"; 6. "I'm Still Watching This Morning"; 7. "I'm Still Maturing This Morning"; 8. "I Still Need Advice This Morning"; 9. "I'm Still Not Sitting This Morning"; 10. "I'm Still Protecting You This Morning"
2	June 6, 2025	978-4-253-29662-5	July 28, 2026	979-8-89765-285-3
11. "I'm Still Being Shaken Tonight"; 12. "It's Still Raining This Morning"; 13. "I'm Still Double-Checking This Morning"; 14. "I'm Still Freezing This Morning"; 15. "I Still Haven't Noticed This Morning"; 16. "I'm Still Egging You on This Morning"; 17. "I Still Can't Concentrate This Morning"; 18. "Your Timing Is Still Terrible This Morning"; 19. "I'm Still Choosing This Morning"; 20. "I'm Still Going to Give It to You This Morning"
3	October 8, 2025	978-4-253-00438-1	December 15, 2026	979-8-89765-995-1
4	April 8, 2026	978-4-253-01276-8	April 27, 2027	979-8-90209-070-0
5	September 17, 2026	978-4-253-01948-4	—	—

== Reception ==
The series was ranked thirteenth in the print category at the twelfth Next Manga Awards in 2026.
