= Handsome Girl and Sheltered Girl =

Japanese manga series

- First tankōbon volume cover

イケメン女と箱入り娘 (Ikemen Gāru to Hakoiri Musume)
- Genre: Romance; Yuri
- Manga
- Written by: mocchi-au-lait
- Illustrated by: majoccoid
- Published by: Ichijinsha
- English publisher: NA: Seven Seas Entertainment
- Magazine: Monthly Comic Rex
- Original run: September 27, 2019 – October 27, 2020
- Volumes: 2

Handsome Girl and Sheltered Girl (Japanese: イケメン女と箱入り娘, Hepburn: Ikemen Gāru to Hakoiri Musume) is a Japanese yuri manga series written by mocchi-au-lait and illustrated by majoccoid. It was serialized in Ichijinsha's Monthly Comic Rex from September 2019 to October 2020. It was licensed for an English-language release by Seven Seas Entertainment.

== Synopsis ==
Having lived a sheltered life before starting university, Okuma Satomi has never really considered men before, but falls in love at first sight with Kanda Mizuki, a handsome man in one of her classes. When Okuma asks Kanda for a favor, Kanda agrees on the condition that they go on a date, and Okuma is overjoyed. However, Kanda soon realizes that there has been a misunderstanding between them, as Kanda is actually a woman.

== Publication ==
Written by mocchi-au-lait and illustrated by majoccoid, Handsome Girl and Sheltered Girl was serialized in Ichijinsha's Monthly Comic Rex from September 27, 2019, to October 27, 2020, and collected into 2 tankōbon volumes as of December 25, 2020.

The series was licensed for an English release in North America by Seven Seas Entertainment, who collected both volumes into a single omnibus edition.

| No. | Original release date | Original ISBN | English release date | English ISBN |
|---|---|---|---|---|
| 1 | March 27, 2020 | 9784758068550 | September 24, 2024 | 979-88-916049-0-2 |
| 2 | December 25, 2020 | 9784758069014 | September 24, 2024 | 979-88-916049-0-2 |

== Reception ==
Erica Friedman of Okazu gave both volumes an overall rating of 8 out of 10, noting in her review of the first volume: "It was a sweet story and I certainly want them to be happy....but it was often very annoying as well [...] I really want to like this manga. The art being by majoccoid helps so much, I won't lie. Kanda-kun looks cool when she's supposed to. Satomis [sic] is cute. Mochi_Au_Lait just does not have the style for this. The characters are likable, the situation is not problematic, but it is, nonetheless, a problem."
