= The Condemned Villainess Goes Back in Time and Aims to Become the Ultimate Villain =

Japanese light novel series

- First light novel volume cover

断罪された悪役令嬢は、逆行して完璧な悪女を目指す (Danzai sareta Akuyaku Reijō wa, Gyakkō-shite Kanpeki na Akujo o Mezasu)
- Genre: Fantasy; Romance
- Novel series
- Written by: Bakufu Narayama
- Published by: Shōsetsuka ni Narō
- Original run: November 16, 2020 – present
- Light novel
- Written by: Bakufu Narayama
- Illustrated by: Ebisushi
- Published by: TO Books
- English publisher: NA: Seven Seas Entertainment
- Imprint: TO Books (2021–2025); Celica Novels (2026–)
- Original run: September 18, 2021 – present
- Volumes: 11
- Manga
- Written by: Bakufu Narayama
- Illustrated by: Rat Kitaguni
- Published by: TO Books
- English publisher: NA: Seven Seas Entertainment
- Imprint: Corona Comics (vol. 1–7); Celica Comics (vol. 8–)
- Magazine: Corona EX
- Original run: May 23, 2022 – present
- Volumes: 9
- Anime

The Condemned Villainess Goes Back in Time and Aims to Become the Ultimate Villain (Japanese: 断罪された悪役令嬢は、逆行して完璧な悪女を目指す, Hepburn: Danzai sareta Akuyaku Reijō wa, Gyakkō-shite Kanpeki na Akujo o Mezasu) is a Japanese light novel series written by Bakufu Narayama and illustrated by Ebisushi. It began serialization on the user-generated novel publishing website Shōsetsuka ni Narō in November 2020. It was later acquired by TO Books who began releasing it in September 2021. A manga adaptation illustrated by Rat Kitaguni began serialization on TO Books' Corona EX manga website in May 2022. An anime adaptation has been announced.

== Synopsis ==
Claudia, the daughter of a duke, was tricked by her half-sister Fermina, had her marriage canceled and was later sold to a brothel. While there, she develops a reputation as one of the best workers in the brothel, but suddenly dies of an illness. Later she gets transported to when she was fourteen, and with all the knowledge she had previously, she vows her revenge.

== Characters ==
Claudia Lindsay (クラウディア・リンジー, Kuraudia Rinjńī)
Portrayed by: Haruka Komiyama (stage play)
Sylvester Harland (シルヴェスター・ハーランド, Shiruvesutā Hārando)
Portrayed by: Fumitaka Kuroki (stage play)
Virgil Lindsay (ヴァージル・リンジー, Vājiru Rinjī)
Portrayed by: Yuta Suzuki (stage play)
Fermina Lindsay (フェルミナ・リンジー, Ferumina Rinjī)
Portrayed by: Non Harusaki (stage play)
Helen Hoskins (ヘレン・ホスキンス, Heren Hosukinsu)
Portrayed by: Minori Takahashi (stage play)
Tristan Newbury (トリスタン・ニューベリー, Torisutan Nyūberī)
Portrayed by: Yu Ichinose (stage play)
Louise Saville (ルイーゼ・サヴィル, Ruīze Saviru)
Portrayed by: Marina Nishii (stage play)
Brian Evans (ブライアン・エバンズ, Buraian Evanzu)
Portrayed by: Kazuya Kurosawa (stage play)

== Media ==
=== Light novel ===
Written by Bakufu Narayama, The Condemned Villainess Goes Back in Time and Aims to Become the Ultimate Villain began serialization on the user-generated novel publishing website Shōsetsuka ni Narō on November 16, 2020. It was later acquired by TO Books who began releasing it with illustrations by Ebisushi on September 18, 2021. Eleven volumes have been released as of October 1, 2026.

The series is licensed in English by Seven Seas Entertainment.

No.	Original release date	Original ISBN	North American release date	North American ISBN
1	September 18, 2021	978-4-86699-332-4	February 22, 2024 (digital); March 5, 2024 (print)	979-8-88843-616-5
Chapter 1: "The Villainess Is Condemned, Sent to a Brothel"; Chapter 2: "The Villainess Goes Back in Time"; Chapter 3: "The Villainess Attends a Tea Party with His Royal Highness"; Chapter 4: "The Villainess Piques the Prince's Interest"; Chapter 5: "The Villainess Gets an Older Sister"; Chapter 6: "The Lady Maid Gets a Younger Sister"; Chapter 7: "The Noble Lord Would Like His Sister to Rely on Him More"; Chapter 8: "The Villainess's Encounter with Her Half-Sister"; Chapter 9: "The Younger Half-Sister Hates the Villainess"; Chapter 10: "The Villainess Begins Attending the Academy"; Chapter 11: "The Villainess Participates in the School Council"; Chapter 12: "The Villainess Is Entranced by the Sunset"; Chapter 13: "The Villainess Gets to Work"; Chapter 14: "The Young Noble Lord Meets His Goddess"; Chapter 15: "The Villainess and the Prince Who Desires Her"; Chapter 16: "The Villainess Faces a Problem Head-On"; Chapter 17: "The Younger Half-Sister Rendezvouses with Her Accomplice"; Chapter 18: "The Villainess Has No Time to Enjoy the School Festival"; Chapter 19: "The Knight Captain's Son Hopes for a Smooth Resolution"; Chapter 20: "The Marquess' Daughter Learns Warmth"; Chapter 21: "The Villainess Cuts a Path Forward"; Chapter 22: "The Future That Lies Ahead"; Chapter 23: "The Time Before Time Rewound"; Chapter 24: "The Battle Between the Villainess and the Crown Prince"; Chapter 25: "The Villainess's Gift to Her Lady Maid"; Bonus: "The Villainess's Gift to the Duke's Heir"
2	February 10, 2022	978-4-86699-423-9	May 16, 2024 (digital); June 25, 2024 (print)	979-8-88843-668-4
3	June 20, 2022	978-4-86699-550-2	October 17, 2024 (digital); November 19, 2024 (print)	979-8-89160-073-7
4	December 20, 2022	978-4-86699-729-2	March 13, 2025 (digital); April 15, 2025 (print)	979-8-89160-074-4
5	June 20, 2023	978-4-86699-865-7	June 19, 2025 (digital); July 15, 2025 (print)	979-8-89373-016-6
6	April 15, 2024	978-4-86794-159-1	October 23, 2025 (digital); November 18, 2025 (print)	979-8-89373-962-6
7	December 14, 2024	978-4-86794-341-0	February 26, 2026 (digital); March 17, 2026 (print)	979-8-89561-453-2
8	June 14, 2025	978-4-86794-585-8	June 11, 2026 (digital); July 14, 2026 (print)	979-8-89765-173-3
9	October 15, 2025	978-4-86794-734-0	December 29, 2026 (print)	979-8-89765-940-1
10	April 1, 2026	978-4-86794-950-4	—	—
11	October 1, 2026	978-4-86854-145-5	—	—

=== Manga ===
A manga adaptation illustrated by Rat Kitaguni began serialization on TO Books' Corona EX manga website on May 23, 2022. The manga's chapters have been collected into nine tankōbon volumes as of October 2026.

The manga adaptation is also licensed in English by Seven Seas Entertainment.

No.	Original release date	Original ISBN	North American release date	North American ISBN
1	August 1, 2022	978-4-86699-629-5	April 9, 2024	979-8-88843-621-9
2	December 1, 2022	978-4-86699-717-9	July 23, 2024	979-8-88843-670-7
3	June 15, 2023	978-4-86699-876-3	December 3, 2024	978-1-68579-529-0
4	July 16, 2024	978-4-86794-243-7	April 29, 2025	979-8-89373-284-9
5	December 14, 2024	978-4-86794-382-3	October 28, 2025	979-8-89561-217-0
6	June 2, 2025	978-4-86794-576-6	April 21, 2026	979-8-89765-174-0
7	October 1, 2025	978-4-86794-716-6	October 6, 2026	979-8-89765-941-8
8	April 1, 2026	978-4-86794-929-0	April 20, 2027	979-8-90209-036-6
9	October 1, 2026	978-4-86854-137-0	—	—

=== Stage play ===
A stage play adaptation was announced on December 14, 2024. The play was held at Shibuya's CBGK Shibugeki from March 26–30, 2025.

=== Anime ===
An anime adaptation was announced on March 27, 2026.

== Reception ==
By April 2026, the series had over 2 million copies in circulation.
