= The Delinquent and the Transfer Student =

Japanese manga series

- First tankōbon volume cover

スケバンと転校生 (Sukeban to Tenkōsei)
- Genre: Romantic comedy; Yuri
- Manga
- Written by: Fujichika
- Published by: Futabasha
- English publisher: NA: Seven Seas Entertainment
- Magazine: Web Comic Action
- Original run: October 22, 2021 – October 11, 2024
- Volumes: 3

The Delinquent and the Transfer Student (Japanese: スケバンと転校生, Hepburn: Sukeban to Tenkōsei) is a Japanese manga series written and illustrated by Fujichika. It was serialized online via Futabasha's Web Comic Action from October, 2021, to October, 2024, and is licensed for an English-language release by Seven Seas Entertainment. The series follows the unlikely relationship between a high school delinquent and a new transfer student.

== Synopsis ==
Kanzaki Riri, a carefree transfer student, begins an unusual friendship with the new school's most notorious sukeban, Nagumo Atsuko, by getting her say cute words and phrases she thinks up. While playing their word game gives them an excuse to spend time with each other, the pair begins to wish to deepen their budding relationship.

== Publication ==
Written and illustrated by Fujichika, The Delinquent and the Transfer Student was serialized online via Futabasha's Web Comic Action from October 22, 2021 to October 11, 2024. The series was collected in three tankōbon volumes.

The series is licensed for an English release in North America by Seven Seas Entertainment.

| No. | Original release date | Original ISBN | English release date | English ISBN |
|---|---|---|---|---|
| 1 | July 21, 2022 | 978-4-575-44016-4 | June 2, 2026 | 979-8-89765-282-2 |
| 2 | September 21, 2023 | 978-4-575-44042-3 | August 25, 2026 | 979-8-89765-283-9 |
| 3 | October 24, 2024 | 978-4-575-44066-9 | December 8, 2026 | 979-8-89765-284-6 |

== Reception ==
The series was a nominee for AnimeJapan's "Manga We Want to See Animated" poll in 2026.
