= We Started a Threesome! =

Japanese manga series

- First tankōbon volume cover

3P始めました!! (Surī Pātonā Hajimemashita!!)
- Genre: Romance; Slice of life
- Manga
- Written by: Katsu Aki
- Published by: Shogakukan
- English publisher: NA: Seven Seas Entertainment
- Magazine: eBigComic4
- Original run: December 7, 2018 – April 2, 2021
- Volumes: 3
- icon

We Started a Threesome! (Japanese: 3P始めました!!, Hepburn: Surī Pātonā Hajimemashita!!) is a Japanese web manga series written and illustrated by Katsu Aki. It was serialized on Shogakukan's eBigComic4 website from December 2018 to April 2021.

== Publication ==
Written and illustrated by Katsu Aki, We Started a Threesome! was on Shogakukan's eBigComic4 website from December 7, 2018, to April 2, 2021. Shogakukan collected its chapters in three tankōbon volumes, released from September 30, 2019, to June 30, 2021.

In North America, Seven Seas Entertainment announced in March 2023 that they had licensed the series, and the first volume is set to be released in December of the same year.

=== Volumes ===
No.	Original release date	Original ISBN	English release date	English ISBN
1	September 30, 2019	978-4-09-860431-9	December 5, 2023	979-8-88843-260-0
2	June 30, 2020	978-4-09-860674-0	April 9, 2024	979-8-88843-403-1
3	June 30, 2021	978-4-09-861092-1	September 3, 2024	979-8-88843-589-2
