= Shinichirō Ushijima =

Japanese anime director and storyboard artist

Shinichiro Ushijima (牛嶋新一郎, Ushijima Shin'ichirō) is a Japanese anime director and storyboard artist, best known for directing the 2018 theatrical anime film I Want to Eat Your Pancreas.

== Biography ==
Ushijima was born in Fukuoka Prefecture. He majored in design at a college in Los Angeles and later started out working at animation studio Madhouse. Prior to I Want to Eat Your Pancreas, he directed the opening of the anime series Sunday Without God (2013), participated as assistant director in the anime series One Punch Man (2015–, including the OVA One Punch Man: Road to Hero) and All Out!! (2016–2017), and directed an individual episode of the anime series Death Parade (2015). As a storyboard artist, he worked on individual episodes of anime series such as My Love Story!! (2015).

In 2018, the first theatrical anime film directed by Ushijima was released, the adaptation of Yoru Sumino's novel I Want to Eat Your Pancreas, for which Ushijima worked with Studio VOLN. About the production of this film, he stated that he had read the original novel many times before he started working on the anime, and wanted to express through his film the feeling that he got from reading the book. He also said he took great care to emphasize the opposite personalities of the unnamed male protagonist and Sakura, the female protagonist, and to convey a development in these two main characters over the course of the film, with the aim of making the viewers feel attached to them and thus gripping the hearts of the audience.

After I Want to Eat Your Pancreas, Ushijima did some more work for television anime as assistant director (Hunter × Hunter, 2018–2019) and episode storyboard artist (BNA: Brand New Animal, 2020; Fate/Grand Order - Absolute Demonic Front: Babylonia, 2020; Kiratto Pri Chan, 2020; Kaguya-sama: Love Is War, 2022), and he directed individual episodes for a number of other anime series, including Karakuri Circus (2019; another Studio VOLN production), To the Abandoned Sacred Beasts (2019), Norimono Man – Carl from Mobile Land (2020), Sing "Yesterday" for Me (2020), Wonder Egg Priority (2021), Akebi's Sailor Uniform (2022), Tokyo 24th Ward (2022) and My Dress-Up Darling (2022). Ushijima went on to direct his first anime series, UniteUp!, which is part of a multimedia franchise, with animation studio CloverWorks in 2023.
