= I Want to Eat Your Pancreas =

2015 Japanese novel by Yoru Sumino

- Cover of the novel featuring Haruki Shiga (left) and Sakura Yamauchi (right)

君の膵臓をたべたい (Kimi no Suizō o Tabetai)
- Genre: Coming-of-age, drama
- Serial novel
- Written by: Yoru Sumino
- Published by: Shōsetsuka ni Narō
- Published: 2014
- Novel
- Written by: Yoru Sumino
- Illustrated by: loundraw
- Published by: Futabasha
- English publisher: NA: Seven Seas Entertainment
- Published: June 19, 2015
- Manga
- Illustrated by: Izumi Kirihara
- Published by: Futabasha
- English publisher: NA: Seven Seas Entertainment
- Magazine: Monthly Action
- Original run: August 25, 2016 – May 25, 2017
- Volumes: 2
- Films
- Let Me Eat Your Pancreas (2017 live-action film); I Want to Eat Your Pancreas (2018 anime film)
- icon

I Want to Eat Your Pancreas (Japanese: 君の膵臓をたべたい, Hepburn: Kimi no Suizō o Tabetai), also known as Let Me Eat Your Pancreas, is a novel by the Japanese writer Yoru Sumino. Initially serialized as a web novel in the user-generated site Shōsetsuka ni Narō in 2014, the book was published in print in 2015 by Futabasha. A manga adaptation ran from 2016 to 2017. A live-action film titled Let Me Eat Your Pancreas premiered in 2017, and an anime film adaptation premiered on September 1, 2018.

== Plot ==
The story revolves around an unnamed male protagonist, a high school student who prefers to spend his time reading, and his relationship with his classmate, Sakura Yamauchi, a cheerful and popular girl who is secretly suffering from a terminal illness affecting her pancreas. Their unlikely connection begins when the protagonist discovers Sakura's handwritten journal, titled Living with Dying, in a hospital lobby. The journal details Sakura's thoughts and feelings about her impending death and her desire to live life to the fullest.

Despite his initial reluctance, the protagonist is drawn into Sakura's world, and they begin spending time together. They embark on a series of adventures, including a trip to Fukuoka, where they explore local specialties, visit shrines, and share meals. Throughout their time together, Sakura encourages the protagonist to open himself up to others, while they both grapple with the reality of her mortality. As their bond deepens, they share personal secrets and challenge each other's perspectives, with Sakura determined to make the most of her remaining time. Eventually, the protagonist finds himself needing Sakura just as she needs him.

The story takes a tragic turn when Sakura is murdered in an alleyway, becoming a victim of a random killer, leaving the protagonist to deal with his grief and the unanswered questions about their relationship. He is deeply saddened by her death and the abrupt end to their connection. He never attends Sakura's funeral, but eventually musters the courage to visit her parents at her house, where he receives her book, Living with Dying, as per her wishes.

He finds a way to make sense of what he is feeling by seeking out Sakura's best friend, Kyoko, to whom he reveals the truth about Sakura's illness and her journal. In a heartfelt conversation, he shares the contents of Living with Dying, including Sakura's final message to Kyoko and to him, finally telling Kyoko that he too had grown to care for Sakura. The protagonist, Haruki Shiga, ultimately learns that Sakura had come to love him, despite her stated reluctance to form a romantic bond, and that she had also come to recognize his need for connection. He promises to keep her memory alive and to live his life more fully, carrying the lessons he learned from Sakura and their brief but impactful time together.

== Characters ==
The character names listed here are in western order of family name last. The official English language light novel and manga volumes use the Japanese naming order of family name first, while the English subtitles of the anime use the western order.

"Me" (「僕」, "Boku") / Haruki Shiga (志賀 春樹, Shiga Haruki)
Voiced by: Mahiro Takasugi (Japanese); Robbie Daymond (English)
Portrayed by: Takumi Kitamura, Shun Oguri (adult)
Sakura Yamauchi (山内 桜良, Yamauchi Sakura)
Voiced by: Lynn (Japanese); Erika Harlacher (English)
Portrayed by: Minami Hamabe
Kyoko Takimoto (滝本 恭子, Takimoto Kyōko)
Voiced by: Yukiyo Fujii (Japanese); Kira Buckland (English)
Portrayed by: Karen Otomo, Keiko Kitagawa (adult)
Takahiro (隆弘)
Voiced by: Yuma Uchida (Japanese); Kyle McCarley (English)
Portrayed by: Dori Sakurada
"Gum Boy" (「和原」, "Kazuhara") / Issei Miyata (宮田 一誠, Miyata Issei)
Voiced by: Jun Fukushima (Japanese); Khoi Dao (English)
Portrayed by: Yuma Yamoto, Yusuke Kamiji (adult)
"Me"'s mother (「僕」の母, "Boku" no haha)
Voiced by: Atsuko Tanaka (Japanese); Minae Noji (English)
Sakura's mother (桜良の母, Sakura no haha)
Voiced by: Emi Wakui (Japanese); Dorah Fine (English)
Portrayed by: Satomi Nagano

== Media ==
=== Novel ===
Yoru Sumino originally published the novel as a web novel on the user-generated content site Shōsetsuka ni Narō in 2014, before Futabasha republished it with cover art by loundraw on June 19, 2015 (ISBN 978-4-575-23905-8). English publisher Seven Seas Entertainment announced their license to the novel on March 15, 2018, and it was released on November 20, 2018.

=== Manga ===
Izumi Kirihara began serializing a manga adaptation in Futabasha's Monthly Action magazine on August 25, 2016, and ended the series on May 25, 2017. The chapters were compiled into two collected tankōbon volumes, published on February 10, 2017 (ISBN 978-4-575-84925-7), and June 20, 2017 (ISBN 978-4-575-84993-6). The manga is also licensed by Seven Seas, who released the first volume on January 22, 2019.

=== Live-action film ===
A Japanese live-action film based on the novel, titled Let Me Eat Your Pancreas, starring Takumi Kitamura and Minami Hamabe in the lead roles premiered in Japan on July 28, 2017. The film was also shown in South Korea at the Busan International Film Festival in October 2017, and in Malaysia on November 9, 2017, where it was distributed by GSC Movies.

=== Anime film ===
A Japanese animated film adaptation of the novel, titled I Want to Eat Your Pancreas, was announced in August 2017. The film is written for the screen and directed by Shinichiro Ushijima and produced by Keiji Mita at Studio VOLN, with music composed by Hiroko Sebu. Yūichi Oka provides the character designs and serves as chief supervising animator. Yukako Ogawa is the background supervisor and is assisted by Yoshito Watanabe. Sound effects are produced by Noriko Izumo under the direction of Jōji Hata. Compositing for the film was supervised by Hiroshi Saitō and directed by Mayuko Koike. Koremi Kishi was the 3D CG director, and Yoshinori Horikawa was the color designer. The film was edited by Yumi Jingugi. The film's theme song is "Fanfare" (ファンファーレ) and the ending is "Shunkashūtō" (春夏秋冬; transl. "The Four Seasons"). Both songs are by the band Sumika, who also played voice acting roles in the film. The film is distributed by Aniplex in Japan and premiered in theaters on September 1, 2018.
