= Sara Matsumoto =

Japanese voice actress

- 松本 沙羅
- Born: 25 May 1992 (age 34)
- Occupation: Voice actress
- Years active: 2013–present
- Notable work: Kono Oto Tomare! Sounds of Life as Hiro Kurusu; Yashahime as Towa Higurashi; Back Arrow as Jim; KamiErabi God.app as Honoka

Sara Matsumoto (松本 沙羅, Matsumoto Sara; born 25 May 1992) is a Japanese voice actress affiliated with Kenyu Office. She voiced Towa Higurashi in Yashahime, Hiro Kurusu in Kono Oto Tomare! Sounds of Life, and Jim in Back Arrow.

== Biography ==
Sara Matsumoto, a native of Chiba Prefecture, was born on 25 May 1992. She was educated at Tokyo Announce Gakuin and Kenyu Office's Talk Back training center. In May 2017, she was cast as Wanchoi in The Silver Guardian. In February 2019, she was cast as Hiro Kurusu in Kono Oto Tomare! Sounds of Life.

In August 2020, Matsumoto was cast as Towa Higurashi, the main character of the Inuyasha sequel anime television series Yashahime. In March 2021, she appeared at AnimeJapan 2021's Yashahime booth "Bringing Anime to Life with Sound".

In December 2020, Matsumoto was cast as Jim in Back Arrow. In March 2023, she was cast in the anime television adaptation of Shinsuke Yoshitake's picture book Sore Shikanai Wake Nai Deshō; where she voices the older brother of the protagonist. In January 2023, she voiced Tomoki in "Ice Cream Truck", the second segment of the second episode of Junji Ito Maniac: Japanese Tales of the Macabre. In May 2023, she was cast as Loretta Kugret in I'm in Love with the Villainess.

Matsumoto voiced Namida Suzumeno in Boruto, Pete in Karakuri Circus, Mokomoko in NiNoKuni, Kanami in Ghost in the Shell: SAC 2045, Mari Ikoma in My Hero Academia, Naomi Komachi in Tropical-Rouge! Pretty Cure, Charlotte in Birdie Wing: Golf Girls' Story, young Mahiru Seki in Call of the Night, young Kōki Suidō in Tokyo 24th Ward, and Aya in Urusei Yatsura. In video games, Matsumoto voiced Daniel Diaz in Life Is Strange 2 and Monaka Tsukishiro in Heaven Burns Red.

== Filmography ==
=== Anime ===
2017

- Boruto, Namida Suzumeno, Ōga/Yatsume
- The Silver Guardian, Wanchoi
- Soreike! Anpanman, Onion Oni, others

2018

- Karakuri Circus, Pete

2019

- Kono Oto Tomare! Sounds of Life, Hiro Kurusu
- NiNoKuni, Mokomoko

2020

- Ghost in the Shell: SAC 2045, Kanami
- My Hero Academia, Mari Ikoma
- Yashahime, Towa Higurashi

2021

- Back Arrow, Jim
- The Seven Deadly Sins: Dragon's Judgement, young Escanor
- Tropical-Rouge! Precure, Naomi Komachi

2022

- Birdie Wing: Golf Girls' Story, Charlotte
- Call of the Night, young Mahiru Seki
- Motto! Majime ni Fumajime Kaiketsu Zorori, baby
- Tokyo 24th Ward, young Kōki Suidō, others
- Urusei Yatsura, Aya

2023

- I'm in Love with the Villainess, Loretta Kugret
- Junji Ito Maniac: Japanese Tales of the Macabre, Tomoki
- Sore Shikanai Wake Nai Deshō, older brother
- The Dreaming Boy Is a Realist, Rena Aizawa
- Zom 100: Bucket List of the Dead, Sumire Kousaka
- Undead Girl Murder Farce, Fatima Double Darts
- KamiErabi God.app, Honoka

2025

- The Water Magician, Rin

=== Video games ===
2020

- Life Is Strange 2, Daniel Diaz

2022

- Heaven Burns Red, Monaka Tsukishiro

=== Dubbing ===
- Record of Youth (Ahn Jeong-ha (Park So-dam)
- Secret Level (Mega Man (Alkaio Thiele)
- The Equalizer 3 (Emma Collins (Dakota Fanning))
- Thanksgiving (Jessica (Nell Verlaque))
