= List of Back Arrow characters =

The following is a list of characters from the Back Arrow animated TV series.

== Characters ==
=== Main characters ===
Back Arrow (バック・アロウ, Bakku Arō)
Voiced by: Yuki Kaji (Japanese); Shannon McCormick (English)
An amnesiac young man who emerged from a Rakuho capsule that landed in Edger Village. He claims his only memory is that he is from "beyond the wall" and seeks to return despite people believing nothing exists past the wall. He takes his alias from Bit calling him an idiot (バカやろう (Bakayarō), "blunt arrow" in the English dub). His Briheight Muga (ムガ) is a blue and white humanoid. Lacking a solid Conviction, Muga is composed of a malleable gel-like material that absorbs physical attacks and is capable of feats generally thought impossible for Briheights, primarily the ability to destroy Briheights without killing the operator. Muga is also capable of shapeshifting and unlocking new abilities seemingly on Arrow's whim, such as morphing into a sword other Briheights can wield or spontaneously growing wings to fly. Arrow also appears to be able to operate his Briheight for far longer than most people, once keeping Muga manifested for nearly five hours while the average user struggles to maintain their armor for more than one or two hours. It is later revealed that Arrow was sent to Lingalind by "God" to destroy the continent and all of its inhabitants. When his destructive power manifests, he is unable to remove his Bind Warper and deactivate Muga and the Briheight seemingly moves on its own beyond his control, emitting a golden light that erases Conviction Particles and kills whoever it touches.

=== Edger Village / Granedger United ===
Atlee Ariel (アタリー・アリエル, Atarī Arieru)
Voiced by: Aya Suzaki (Japanese); Natalie Rose (English)
The sheriff of Edger Village after her father passed away. Her Briheight Ryuju (リュージュ) manifests as a pink and white feminine humanoid that can use whip-like weapons stored in its forearms. Atlee's Conviction is I'll Manage Somehow (とりあえずやり過ごす, Toriaezu yarisugosu), allowing her to easily slip through most attacks unscathed. However, her gentle nature makes Ryuju fairly weak in combat. Ryuju possesses a special attack named "Lightning Whip" that allows her to charge her whip weapons with electrical energy. Later, Atlee is named queen of the new nation Granedger United, based on the flying dreadnought Granedger.
Elsha Lean (エルシャ・リーン, Erusha Rīn)
Voiced by: Ari Ozawa (Japanese); Alexis Tipton (English)
Granddaughter of Burk Lean, chief of Edger Village. Her Briheight is the yellow and green Shadoh (シャドウ), a feminine form equipped with basic blasters mounted on the forearms and wings. Shadoh's primary ability, derived from Elsha's Conviction Survive No Matter What (絶対に生きのびる, Zettai ni ikinobiru), is to merge with the flying dreadnought Granedger (グランエッジャ, Guranejja), acting as the figurehead on its prow and allowing Elsha to steer it. Granedger is initially buried beneath Edger Village, but is awakened by Elsha manifesting Shadoh for the first time. Its emergence destroys the village, forcing its inhabitants to move to the ship and accompany Arrow on his journey. Later it is revealed that Granedger can be kept on course without Shadoh by using a Residual Conviction System built into the ship, but requires Shadoh to be attached for anything more complex. Soon after departing on Granedger, Elsha's grandfather steps down as chief of the village, passing the title to her. She later steps down from being chief of the village to allow Atlee to become the queen of Granedger United, claiming that helming Granedger with Shadoh is a big enough responsibility on its own.
Burk Lean (バーク・リーン, Bāku Rīn)
Voiced by: Kunihiro Kawamoto (Japanese); Charlie Campbell (English)
Chief of Edger Village and Elsha's grandfather. He is highly distrustful of outsiders and disapproves of Edger's villagers being brought along on Arrow's journey, fearing that the World Wall will curse his people should they continue.
Bit Namital (ビット・ナミタル, Bitto Namitaru)
Voiced by: Kensho Ono (Japanese); Arnie Pantoja (English)
A longtime friend of Atlee and Elsha. Despite his boastful, arrogant attitude, he is actually rather cowardly and unlucky. He avoided his village's coming-of-age trials and is inclined to take the easy option in a difficult situation. As a result, he is easily fooled and swayed by more intelligent and willful people. Because of these traits, his allies often have difficulty determining Bit's worth as part of the Granedger crew, though Shū Bi names him admiral of tactics (軍師管理大元帥, Gunshi Kanri Daigensui) (an ultimately meaningless title) to placate his ego. Bit's Briheight Kaiten (カイテン) manifests as a giant Bind Warper, which can attach to Granedger to allow it to assume the giant humanoid mecha form Briheight Granedger. His Conviction is Rely on Damn Near Everyone (とことんまでに人頼み, Tokoton made ni Hitodanomi), which allows him to draw strength from others and further combine Granedger's Briheight configuration with Dairekka to form Granrekka, which he declares is the power of all three of Lingalind's major nations united.
Sola Athin (ソーラ・アシン, Sōra Ashin)
Voiced by: Tomokazu Seki (Japanese); Aaron Roberts (English)
Edger Village's doctor, a man possessing vast knowledge of Bind Warpers and Briheights, and their connection to the user's willpower and Conviction. He claims to have wandered the world for some time before settling in Edger Village. His real name is Werner Conrad (ヴェルナー・コンラート, Verunā Konrāto), brother of Prax Conrad. He was formerly the Armored Supreme of Lutoh, but was forced to leave after he caused the accident that created Fine Forté's split personality. His Conviction, according to Rudolf Conductore, is Run Away from Fate (運命から逃げ続ける, Unmei Kara Nigetsuzukeru), which grants his Briheight Palanoash (パラノアッシュ, Paranoasshu) the ability Acceleration, allowing it to move at speeds fast enough to look like teleportation to an outside observer.
Shū Bi (シュウ・ビ)
Voiced by: Tomokazu Sugita, Reina Ueda (young) (Japanese); Brandon McInnis, Sarah Roach (young) (English)
Rekka's former High Diviner, an eccentric scientist who monitors Rakuho capsule arrivals and directs the army to retrieve them. He has been friends with general Kai Rhodan since childhood. He and Kai were sold into slavery as children and have worked their way up as part of a plan change Rekka's government from within. He seemingly betrays Rekka and his promise to Kai to join up with the Granedger crew, finding Arrow irresistibly interesting. In contrast to his intelligence, Shū's stamina is incredibly poor and he quickly tires out after only a few moments of light jogging. His conviction is I think, therefore I am (我思う、故に我在り, Ware Omou, Yue ni Ware Ari) which instead of creating armor, transfers his mind into a Briheight that is his exact doppleganger.
Annie (アニー, Anī)
Voiced by: Reina Ueda (Japanese); Meg McClain (English)
Jim (ジム, Jimu)
Voiced by: Sara Matsumoto (Japanese); Kristen McGuire (English)
Sam (サム, Samu)
Voiced by: Maria Naganawa (Japanese); Suzie Yeung (English)
Tom (トム, Tomu)
Voiced by: Anna Nagase (Japanese); Amber Lee Connors (English)

=== Republic of Rekka ===
Zetsu Daidan (ゼツ・ダイダン, Zetsu Daidan)
Voiced by: Kenyu Horiuchi (Japanese); Ben Bryant (English)
Emperor of Rekka. Despite his advanced age and frail appearance, he has a phenomenally strong Conviction: I Don't Follow a Path; I Make the Path (我が前に道はなし。ただ道を創る, Waga mae ni michi wa nashi, Tada michi o tsukuru), granting his Briheight Ogen (オウゲン) enough raw power to level the surrounding landscape with a gesture. Ogen also has the ability to absorb Conviction from other Briheights in order to repair itself. Because of the sheer power of his Conviction, normal Bind Warpers break down over time as he battles, requiring him to use multiple devices simultaneously to maintain Ogen for any significant period of time. He is also able to easily defeat Briheights using only a handheld wire weapon. He has also displayed the ability to de-age himself, becoming a fit and well-built younger man. In this state, Ogen discards its cloak and becomes much faster and more agile. Zetsu's Conviction grants him so much raw power that he is easily able to counter Arrow's abilities solely by regenerating Ogen faster than Muga can erase it.
Tae Howa (テイ・ホウワ, Tae Houwa)
Voiced by: Kenta Miyake (Japanese); Randy Pearlman (English)
Chancellor of the Republic of Rekka, a greedy and conniving noble. His Conviction is Protect Myself At All Costs (何が何でも我が身を守る, Nani ga Nan demo Waga Mi o Mamoru).
Bai Toatsu (バイ・トウアツ, Bai Toatsu)
Voiced by: Tetsu Inada (Japanese); Chris Rager (English)
Rekka's Northern General. His Briheight Senpu (センプ) wields a large triple-bladed axe and possesses strong offensive power due to his aggressive, battle-hungry personality and his Conviction of Mow Down All Enemies (全ての敵を薙ぎ倒す, Subete no teki o nagitaosu).
Goh Zanga (ゴウ・ザンガ, Gō Zanga)
Voiced by: Nobuyuki Hiyama (Japanese); Marcus D. Stimac (English)
Rekka's Western General. His Briheight Baryu (バリュウ) is themed after an Eastern dragon and is armed with a spear with a beam tip. His Conviction is Fighting Spirit Travels Quickly (闘志千里を走る, Tōshi senri o hashiru) granting his spear weapon near limitless range.
Kai Rhodan (カイ・ロウダン, Kai Rōdan)
Voiced by: Ryōtarō Okiayu, Sachiko Kojima (young) (Japanese); Jarrod Greene (English)
A general in Rekka's army and Shū Bi's childhood friend. His Conviction is Unrivaled (天下御免, Tenka Gomen), which translates into his Briheight Gigan (ギガン), a humanoid clad in bulky red armor and armed with a guandao, boasting incredible strength. He and Shū Bi were sold into slavery by their hometown as children and they have plotted since then change Rekka from the inside. Shu's betrayal deeply hurt him and has caused him to swear vengeance on both Shu and Arrow (who inspired him to leave). He later gains the ability to merge Gigan with Ren Sin's Reppu, creating Gigan Reppu (ギガンレップウ), which shares their abilities and Convictions.
Ren Sin (レン・シン, Ren Shin)
Voiced by: Megumi Han (Japanese); Kristi Rothrock (English)
A devoted, high-ranking soldier in Rekka's army, often accompanying Shū Bi when he ventures out into the world and later becoming Kai Rhodan's subordinate. She has a cold and tough exterior, but Shū Bi claims she is an excellent cook and she is easily flustered when teased. Originally loyal to Shu, his betrayal has filled her with hatred and rage towards him, and she has become fully devoted to serving Kai and killing Shu. Her Conviction is Never Forgive Injustice (不義なるもの断じて許さず, Fugi naru mono danjite yurusazu). Her Briheight was initially named Shunretsu (シュンレツ) and possessed great speed and agility, but after training and reasserting her Conviction, it evolves into Reppu (レップウ). Reppu possesses wings and the ability to merge with Kai Rhodan's Gigan to form Gigan Reppu (ギガンレップウ), combining Gigan's strength with Reppu's speed and flight.
Kyo Meiketsu (キョウ・メイケツ, Kyō Meiketsu)
Voiced by: Junji Majima (Japanese); Andy Mullins (English)
Rekka's Prime Minister. His Conviction is Go With the Flow (流れに身を任す, Nagare ni Mi o Makasu). He is designated the helmsman of Dairekka, a flying dreadnought unearthed in the nation's far north region.
Four Fiends (四界鬼隊, Shikaikitai)
A group of four mercenaries with their own individual elemental-themed Briheights who sometimes work for the Republic of Rekka.

Cho Chisen (コウ・チセン, Kō Chisen)
Voiced by: Ryuichi Kijima (Japanese); Bryan Massey (English)
He controls a yellow earth-themed Briheight Doki (ドキ, Doki) and his conviction is Bury Everything (埋め尽くす, Umetsukusu).
Kei Suiitsu (ケイ・スイイツ, Kei Suiitsu)
Voiced by: Asami Hanase (Japanese); Brianna Roberts (English)
She controls a blue water-themed Briheight Suiki (スイキ, Suiki) her whose conviction is Drown Everything (流し尽くす, Nagashitsukusu).
Nen Kasei (ネン・カセイ, Nen Kasei)
Voiced by: Kentarō Kumagai (Japanese); Anthony Bowling (English)
He controls a red fire-themed Briheight Enki (エンキ, Enki) and his conviction is Burn Everything (燃やし尽くす, Moyashitsukusu).
Sin Fusui (シン・フウスイ, Shin Fūsui)
Voiced by: Yukito Soma (Japanese); Kyle Phillips (English)
He controls a green wind-themed Briheight Fuki (フウキ, Fūki) and his conviction is Blast Everything (飛ばし尽くす, Tobashitsukusu).

=== Supremacy of Lutoh ===
The Supremacy of Lutoh is controlled by six nobles, called the Six Supremes, with Princess Fine Forte as the head of state and advocate of peace.

Fine Forté (フィーネ・フォルテ, Fine Forute)
Voiced by: Ami Koshimizu (Japanese); Tia Ballard (English)
The pacifistic Princess Supreme of Lutoh, who strongly believes in the power of love and diplomacy. Despite her gentle and kind public demeanor, she also possesses a vulgar, aggressive and dark split personality named Finoir (フィノワール, Finowāru), signified by red eyes and a darker, wilder hairstyle. Finoir first manifested herself after Fine underwent a blood transfusion following an accident caused by Sola Athin (then Werner Conrad). Fine later seals this personality using a Bind Warper, turning the device black, but has trouble keeping it under control. She later uses this Bind Warper to manifest the Briheight Lovsolute (ラブソリュート, Rabusoryūto) with her Conviction Love is Everything (愛こそ全て, Ai koso subete), granting it the ability to absorb attacks and redirect the energy as rays of light that can repair Briheights and heal wounds. When Finoir asserts herself, Lovsolute becomes Lovsolute-Noir (ラブソリュート・ノワール, Rabusoryūto Nowāru). This form twists Fine's Conviction and instead of healing others, Lovsolute-Noir absorbs Conviction from other Briheights in order to heal and empower itself.
Prax Conrad (プラーク・コンラート, Purāku Konrāto)
Voiced by: Mikako Komatsu (Japanese); Morgan Lauré (English)
A Commander in the Lutoh military and Lutoh's current Armored Supreme. She is nicknamed "Prax the Bloodstained" for her habit of violently retaliating to any perceived disrespect towards Princess Fine stemming from her Conviction Devotion to the Princess (姫への献身, Hime e no Kenshin). She is also known as "Bratty Prax" for her stubborn and haughty nature. Her Briheight Paranoble (パラノーブル, Paranōburu) possesses the unique ability to fly unassisted, which Shū determines is an artificial power granted by Lutoh somehow modifying Prax's Bind Warper. It also possesses a saber and a shoulder cape that can separate into remotely-guided beam weapons.
Peath Glinhouse (ピース・グリンハウス, Pīsu Gurinhausu)
Voiced by: Kōichi Tōchika (Japanese); Clifford Chapin (English)
One of the members of Fine's Council of Advisers. After the revolution that turns the country into a Republic, he takes the role of leader of the new nation for himself, using a Bind Warper to take command of the flying dreadnought Maestrog, originally buried under Lutoh's Maestrog Castle.
Baran Sujita (バラン・スジータ, Baran Sujīta)
Voiced by: Yasuhiro Mamiya (Japanese); Josh Bangle (English)
Demyne Shaft (デマイン・シャフト, Demain Shafuto)
Voiced by: Riki Kitazawa (Japanese); Jerry Jewell (English)
A maniacal scientist working for Lutoh. He takes particular glee in experimenting on people and has a chorus of scientists under his employ who sing while he experiments.
Fritz Kraus (フリッツ・クラウス, Furittsu Kurausu)
Voiced by: Wataru Hatano (Japanese); Matt Holmes (English)
A member of the Prax Armored Division of Lutoh's military, possessing a green-hued Briheight. After the revolution, he and almost the entire Armored Division mass desert for the newfound Granadger United, turning into the Royal Guard of Queen Atlee.
Hans Paldin (ハンス・パルディン, Hansu Parudin)
Voiced by: Daisuke Nakamura (Japanese); Austin Tindle (English)
A member of the Prax Armored Division of Lutoh's military, possessing a blue-hued Briheight. He, like most members of the Prax Armored Division, defects to Granedger United after the revolution.
Severn Walston (セバーン・ウォルストン, Sebān Worusuton)
Voiced by: Takehito Koyasu (Japanese); Robby Gemaelich (English)
Debugger (デバッガー, Debaggā)
Voiced by: Dai Matsumoto (Japanese); Nazeeh Tarsha (English)
Rudolf Conductore (ルドルフ・コンダクターレ, Rudorufu Kondakutāre)
Voiced by: Shin-ichiro Miki (Japanese); J. Michael Tatum (English)
The Elect Supreme, responsible for choosing the ruler of Lutoh. Rudolf has informants everywhere, which commands a great deal of reverence and fear among the Lutoh populace. He possesses an immensely powerful Conviction, God is Everything (神こそ全て, Kami koso subete) and has a Bind Warper embedded in his body, which allows him to summon the Briheight Diostrage (ディオストラージェ, Diosutorāje), which can further merge with a gigantic dreadnought-like machine known as Diobenedica (ディオベネディッカ, Diobenedikka). Though initially appearing as a massively obese middle-aged man, his true appearance is that of a tall, muscular, and handsome young man, which is referred to as his "audience form." He maintains his obese appearance and constantly indulges in hedonistic pleasures in order to keep himself lazy and distracted, claiming his Conviction has the potential to destroy the world if he ever gets serious. He claims he is not human and is the agent of God who has manipulated Lingalind for years as part of God's plans.
Dissonanza (ディソナンザ, Disonanza)
Voiced by: Kikuko Inoue (Japanese); Mikaela Krantz (English)
Rudolf Conductore's assistant, a young woman dressed in a jester-like outfit, who has the ability to alter her appearance. Her Briheight Phantasmone (ファンタズモーネ, Fantazumōne) similarly has the ability to project illusions and camouflage itself. Her Conviction is Live Till the World Dies (決して死なない、世界の終わりまで, Kesshite Shinanai, Sekai no Owari made), effectively granting her immortality, able to near instantly reappear unscathed if felled in battle.
Butch (ブッチ, Bucchi)
Voiced by: Shigeru Chiba (Japanese); Jordan Dash Cruz (English)

=== Iki Territory ===
Garay Barigaban (ガライ・バリバガーン, Garai Barigabān)
Voiced by: Hiroshi Tsuchida (Japanese); Kenny James (English)
President of the Iki Territory which forms an uneasy alliance with Lutoh Republic to capture Back Arrow.
Tyrone Duster (タイロン・ダスター, Tairon Dasutā)
Voiced by: Tōru Nara (Japanese); Dalton Tindall (English)
A vigilante military commander who is sent to retrieve Arrow. His Conviction is Don't Get Roped into Things (長い物には巻かれろ, Nagai Mono ni wa Makarero), which grants his Briheight, a black and red model with a bulky appearance and arm cannons, a strong defense. He has a habit of spouting clichéd one-liners and exclaiming that he always wanted to say them.

=== Pretty Boys ===
Bruh Brian (ブルー・ブリアン, Burū Burian)
Voiced by: Tatsumaru Tachibana (Japanese); Ry McKeand (English)
Leader of the Pretty Boys, a group of genetically-engineered and unusually handsome young men who were bred as livestock as part of cruel Conviction experiments conducted by Severn Walston. The group escaped and lived in hiding in the autonomous Walston Province on the outskirts of Lutoh's territory. His Briheight is a fairly basic model, which is shared by all of the Pretty Boys.
Gote Gordon (ゴート・ゴードン, Gōto Gōdon)
Voiced by: Takuma Nagatsuka (Japanese); Kiba Walker (English)
Jay (ジェイ, Jei)
Voiced by: Asami Hara (Japanese); Amanda Gish (English)

=== Other characters ===
Guardian (ガーディアン, Gādian)
Voiced by: Shunsuke Takeuchi (Japanese); Larry Brantley (English)
