= I Want to Eat Your Pancreas (film) =

2018 Japanese animated film by Shinichiro Ushijima

- Theatrical release poster
- Kanji: 君の膵臓をたべたい
- Revised Hepburn: Kimi no Suizō o Tabetai
- Directed by: Shinichiro Ushijima
- Screenplay by: Shinichiro Ushijima
- Based on: I Want to Eat Your Pancreas by Yoru Sumino
- Produced by: Yuma Takahashi; Shinichiro Kashiwada
- Starring: Mahiro Takasugi; Lynn; Yukiyo Fujii; Yuma Uchida; Jun Fukushima; Atsuko Tanaka; Shin-ichiro Miki; Emi Wakui
- Cinematography: Mayuko Koike
- Edited by: Yumi Jinguji
- Music by: Hiroko Sebu
- Production company: Studio VOLN
- Distributed by: Aniplex
- Release dates: July 24, 2018 (Tokyo); September 1, 2018 (Japan)
- Running time: 108 minutes
- Country: Japan
- Language: Japanese
- Box office: ¥500 million (Japan); US$6.5 million (worldwide)

I Want to Eat Your Pancreas (Japanese: 君の膵臓をたべたい, Hepburn: Kimi no Suizō o Tabetai) is a 2018 Japanese animated coming-of-age drama film based on the light novel of the same name by Yoru Sumino. Produced by Studio VOLN and distributed by Aniplex, the film is written and directed by Shinichiro Ushijima and stars Mahiro Takasugi, Lynn, Yukiyo Fujii, Yuma Uchida, Jun Fukushima, Atsuko Tanaka, Shin-ichiro Miki, and Emi Wakui. In the film, a male high school student befriends his classmate Sakura Yamauchi, who is revealed to have a terminal illness in her pancreas.

An anime film adaptation of the light novel was announced in August 2017. The staff for the film revealed in March 2018, with Takasugi and Lynn being announced as the unnamed male high school student and Sakura, respectively. The remaining cast were revealed in June, July, and August 2018.

I Want to Eat Your Pancreas held its preview screening in Tokyo on July 24, 2018, and was released in Japan on September 1. The film grossed over ¥500 million in Japan and received positive reviews from critics, who praised the story and its message, animation, and writing. It received several nominations from film festivals held at Sitges and Scotland.

== Plot ==
An unnamed male high school student comes across a stranded book in a hospital waiting room. He soon discovers that it is a diary kept by his very popular classmate Sakura Yamauchi, who reveals to him that she is secretly suffering from a fatal illness in her pancreas. Despite this, Sakura intends to maintain a normal school life and thus is drawn to him due to his relatively unfazed reaction to her condition. They begin to spend time together and become friends.

During their school break, Sakura invites him on a train trip to Fukuoka where they play truth-or-dare game and eventually share a bed in their hotel room. Afterward, Sakura's friends and classmates grow suspicious and resentful of his newfound closeness to her. The two begin doing activities from Sakura's bucket list together until she is suddenly hospitalized. During her hospitalization, the two sneak out to see fireworks together. When she gets discharged, Sakura invites him for lunch but fails to show up at their meeting place. Later that night, he learns from the news that Sakura died from a stabbing. He breaks down and does not attend her funeral.

Later, he visits Sakura's mother and asks for her diary. Her mother recognizes him and reveals Sakura left a message in the diary for him. The message tells him to keep the diary and to make her best friend Kyoko read it since she was unaware of her illness. Soon after reading the message, he immediately breaks down into tears as he never felt so much sorrow for a single person before. Sakura's mother learns of his name as Haruki Shiga before he leaves and explains how his name meaning "spring trees" relates to her daughter's name which means "cherry blossom". Haruki meets with Kyoko, who is in denial that Sakura ever lied to her, but she runs away after reading the diary. Haruki runs after her and asks her to be his friend. In a post-credits scene, Haruki and Kyoko, who are now friends, visit Sakura's grave a year later.

== Voice cast ==
Character	Japanese	English
"Me" / Haruki Shiga	Mahiro Takasugi	Robbie Daymond
Sakura Yamauchi	Lynn	Erika Harlacher
Kyoko	Yukiyo Fujii	Kira Buckland
Takahiro	Yuma Uchida	Kyle McCarley
Gum Boy (Note: Identified off-screen as Issei Miyata)	Jun Fukushima	Khoi Dao
"Me"'s mother	Atsuko Tanaka	Minae Noji
"Me"'s father	Shin-ichiro Miki	Patrick Seitz
Sakura's mother	Emi Wakui	Dorah Fine

== Production ==
In August 2017, an anime film adaptation of I Want to Eat Your Pancreas light novel series by Yoru Sumino was announced. Shinichiro Ushijima as director and screenwriter, Yūichi Oka as chief animation director and character designer, Mayuko Koike as cinematographer, and Yumi Jingugi as editor were confirmed in March 2018 as part of the staff behind the film at Studio VOLN. In contrast to his past directing of action films, this was Ushijima's first time working on a "coming-of-age drama" genre. Additionally, Mahiro Takasugi and Lynn were announced to be starring in the film as the unnamed male high school student credited as "Me" (僕, Boku) and Sakura Yamauchi, respectively. This was Takasugi's debut in voice acting. In June 2018, Yukiyo Fujii, Yuma Uchida, Jun Fukushima, Atsuko Tanaka, and Shin-ichiro Miki were cast as Kyoko, Takahiro, Gum Boy, and "Me"'s mother and father, respectively. In July 2018, Emi Wakui joined the cast in her voice acting debut as Sakura's mother. In August 2018, 3DCG director Koremi Kishi stated how the team spent a lot of time and effort animating trams and diesel railcars since they were "important elements of the [film]'s worldview." Despite the frequent use of 3D in the layout and moving backgrounds, the team tried to avoid using it "in a way that would make the technology stand out and to make it fit naturally into the screen." That month, the four members of the band Sumika were cast in undisclosed roles. The English dub cast for the film was announced by Aniplex of America in November 2018.

== Music ==
Hiroko Sebu was announced to be composing I Want to Eat Your Pancreas in March 2018. This was Sebu's first time composing an anime film. She used the pizzicato technique to create sounds that would make "[Sakura] look cute... based on [her] movements and the way her hair flutters". Sumika was revealed to be performing the theme music and insert song for the film in May 2018, with the song "Fanfare" (ファンファーレ) as the opening theme music. The film's ending theme music titled "The Four Seasons" (春夏秋冬, Shunkashūtō) was revealed in July 2018. The two theme music and the original soundtrack, which includes the film version of the insert song "Secret" (秘密, Himitsu), were released in Japan on August 29, 2018.

I Want to Eat Your Pancreas Anime Film Original Soundtrack track listing
No.	Title	Length
1.	"Prologue"	1:13
2.	"Slope"	1:24
3.	"[Classmate Who Knows the Secret]"	3:37
4.	"She Tries to Be a Party"	1:31
5.	"Paradise"	1:51
6.	"Words That I Used Casually"	2:11
7.	"Rather than Travel"	0:56
8.	"First Landing!"	0:55
9.	"We're in a Room Together"	0:44
10.	""Truth or Dare?""	0:55
11.	"This Is Reality"	1:20
12.	"Honshin"	0:43
13.	"Punishment for Yourself"	1:49
14.	"It's Not a Coincidence"	2:49
15.	"What I Want to Do"	0:54
16.	"True Feelings"	1:58
17.	"I Want to Eat Your Pancreas"	2:25
18.	"I Broke My Promise"	1:06
19.	"The Tenth Morning"	0:58
20.	"Disease Coexistence Journal"	3:21
21.	"Someone, Not Me"	7:33
22.	"Cherry Blossoms and Spring"	1:14
23.	"Truth"	1:47
24.	""Let's Be Happy""	2:09
25.	"I Want to Eat Your Pancreas -Main Theme-"	2:39
26.	"Secret (movie ver.)"	2:27
Total length:		50:29

== Marketing ==
In August 2017, the first special news trailer and visual for I Want to Eat Your Pancreas were published. In January 2018, the film received the second visual as well as a tagline that reads, "The distance between two people still has no name." The second and third special news trailers for the film were released in March and May 2018, respectively. The third visual for the film was published in June 2018, followed by the fourth and main visual the following month. To My Father and to Someone in My Memories (父と追憶の誰かに, Chichi to Tsuioku no Dareka ni), a sequel to the light novel series, was announced in August 2018 as a gift to filmgoers in Japan who saw the film in participating theaters. The official guidebook for the film was released in Japan on October 12, 2018.

Promotional partners for the film included Nakabayashi through their notebook product Logical Air, Toyama Prefecture, H.I.S. Chūbu travel agency, Uniqlo, Hakata Ikkousha ramen restaurant, Sweets Paradise store, Cerezo Osaka, and Respect for Geeks (R4G) clothing brand.

== Release ==
=== Theatrical ===
I Want to Eat Your Pancreas had its early screening in Zepp DiverCity in Tokyo on July 24, 2018. The film was screened at the Seoul International Cartoon and Animation Festival in South Korea on August 23, 2018. The film was widely released in Japan on September 1, 2018. The film held its Australian premiere at the Madman Anime Festival in Melbourne in September 2018 and was widely released in the country on October 18. The film held its United Kingdom premiere at Scotland Loves Anime festival in Glasgow on October 14, 2018. The film held its United States premiere at the Animation Is Film Festival in Los Angeles on October 21, 2018, and was released in 400 theaters in the country by Aniplex of America and Fathom Events for two days on February 7 and 10, 2019.

=== Home media ===
I Want to Eat Your Pancreas was released on Blu-ray and DVD in Japan on April 3, 2019. The film was aired on NHK E on May 2, 2020, and on Nippon TV on July 23, 2021.

Aniplex of America released the film on Blu-ray in the United States on October 29, 2019. Madman Entertainment released the film on Blu-ray and DVD in Australia and New Zealand on January 22, 2020, while Manga Entertainment released it on Blu-ray and DVD in the United Kingdom on February 24.

== Reception ==
=== Box office ===
I Want to Eat Your Pancreas grossed over ¥500 million in Japan. It earned ¥107 million ($968,991) in its opening weekend, placing tenth at the box office. The film had a worldwide box office gross of US$6.5 million.

=== Critical response ===
The review aggregator website Rotten Tomatoes reported an approval rating of 93%, with an average score of 7.2/10, based on 14 reviews. I Want to Eat Your Pancreas light novel author Yoru Sumino had a "mixed review" on its anime film adaptation, stating that it had "good parts, but honestly there are also unsatisfying parts."

Rafael Motamayor graded I Want to Eat Your Pancreas "A−" for Collider, feeling that the film "may look like a traditional romantic drama about a dying character, but it is a heartfelt celebration of life and friendships with a tight script and round characters", and had similarities with The Fault in Our Stars (2014) and A Silent Voice (2016). James Perkins of Starburst felt the film was a "devastatingly beautiful – a gut-punch of a romantic drama that will leave you broken and have you crying your eyes out by its ending with its respectful portrayal of dealing with and accepting loss and finding wonder in the world during the short time we are on this planet for." He praised the film for its "powerful message, sublime animation and writing and deep profound focus on the development of its characters". Alex Osborn gave the film 8 out of 10 for IGN Southeast Asia, feeling that it was "a beautiful and moving exploration of what it means to truly live". Osborn praised the art direction and premise that it "isn't especially novel, but the strength of its core relationship and the satisfying way it concludes makes for a memorable story with a powerful message."

Kim Morrissy of Anime News Network graded the film "B−", feeling that it "isn't... a poor adaptation. It's a perfectly good movie in its own right, and I don't intend to compare its merits to the live-action version. However, [the film] does have some noticeable failings as an animated film." Morrissy criticized the inconsistent character animation with the script and voice acting, and the overuse of filters that became "hard to tell what is happening in those scenes because the characters are completely overshadowed by the effects." However, she praised the film for its "[c]onsistently great voice acting, [and] some good character animation and nuanced writing". Matt Schley rated the film 2 out of 5 stars for The Japan Times, feeling that it would "either leave you sniffling or wishing some zombies had shown up after all." Schley criticized the pacing as similar to "an episodic structure more suited to television", dialogue, narration, and "swelling" music.

=== Accolades ===
I Want to Eat Your Pancreas was nominated for Best Animated Feature Film at the Sitges Film Festival in September 2018. The film won the Audience Award and was nominated for the Jury Award at Scotland Loves Anime festival in October 2018.
