= Yoru =

Yoru may refer to:

== People with the given name ==
- Yoru Sumino (住野 よる, born 1992), Japanese novelist

== Fictional characters ==
- Yoru (Shugo Chara!) (ヨル), fictional character from the Shugo Chara! manga series
- Yoru, or War Devil (戦争の悪魔, Sensō no Akuma), a fictional character from the Chainsaw Man manga series

== Music ==
- "Yoru", a song by Gen Hoshino from Yellow Dancer (2015)
