= Si-Vis: The Sound of Heroes =

Japanese anime television series

- Teaser visual
- Genre: Music
- Created by: Aniplex; Sony Music Entertainment Japan
- Anime television series
- Directed by: Daisuke Yoshida
- Written by: Fumiaki Maruto
- Music by: Shuhei Mutsuki
- Studio: Studio VOLN
- Licensed by: Crunchyroll
- Original network: FNS (Fuji TV)
- Original run: October 5, 2025 – March 29, 2026
- Episodes: 24

Si-Vis: The Sound of Heroes is a Japanese original anime television series produced by Aniplex and Sony Music Entertainment Japan. It was animated by Studio VOLN and directed by Daisuke Yoshida, with series composition by Fumiaki Maruto, and features original character designs by Hidari adapted for animation by Nami Fujii, and music by Shuhei Mutsuki. The series premiered on October 5, 2025, on Fuji TV and other networks, and ran for two consecutive cours. Crunchyroll is streaming the series. The series features opening and ending themes performed by the in-story unit Si-Vis. For the first cours, the opening theme song is "So Far Away", while the ending theme song is "Friends & Smile". During the second cours, the opening theme is "Supernova", and the ending theme is "Singing Over".

== Characters ==
Yosuke Shiba (司馬 洋介, Shiba Yōsuke) / Yosuke
Voiced by: Daisuke Namikawa
Kyoko Takagi (高木 京子, Takagi Kyōko) / Siren (セイレーン, Seirēn)
Voiced by: Ayane Sakura
Miu Narumiya (成宮 魅羽, Narumiya Miu) / μ
Voiced by: Akari Kitō
Soshiro Sakamoto (坂本 奏士郎, Sakamoto Sōshirō) / Sōji (ソウジ, Sōji)
Voiced by: Nobunaga Shimazaki
Jun Asukai (飛鳥井 純, Asukai Jun) / June
Voiced by: Soma Saito
Kyoya Minami (南 響也, Minami Kyōya) / Kyoya (キョウヤ, Kyōya)
Voiced by: Anan Furuya
Nagi (凪, Nagi)
Voiced by: Manaka Iwami
Krios (クリオス, Kuriosu)
Voiced by: Megumi Han
Lukos (リュコス, Ryukosu)
Voiced by: Maaya Uchida

== Episodes ==
No.	Title	Directed by	Written by	Storyboarded by	Original release date
1	"City of Mirage"; Transliteration: "Mirāju no Machi" (Japanese: 蜃気楼(ミラージュ)の街)	Lee Jeong-Muk	Fumiaki Maruto	Daisuke Yoshida	October 5, 2025
2	"A Thoroughly Eaten Star"; Transliteration: "Kui Tsukusareru Hoshi" (Japanese: 喰い尽くされる星)	Tomohisa Onoue & Lee Jeong-Muk	Fumiaki Maruto	Daisuke Yoshida	October 12, 2025
3	"Welcome to Hellish Paradise"; Transliteration: "Jigoku no Yōna Tengoku ni Yōkoso" (Japanese: 地獄のような天国にようこそ)	Lee Jeong-Muk	Fumiaki Maruto	Daisuke Yoshida	October 19, 2025
4	"New Team with a Rocky Road Ahead"; Transliteration: "Zento Tanan no Shin Chīmu" (Japanese: 前途多難の新チーム)	Junichi Fujise & Norifumi Udono	Fumiaki Maruto	Daisuke Yoshida	October 26, 2025
5	"The Day When Five Become One"; Transliteration: "Itsutsu ga Hitotsu ni Natta hi" (Japanese: 五つが一つになった日)	Junichi Fujise & Norifumi Udono	Fumiaki Maruto	Daisuke Yoshida	November 2, 2025
6	"Holding This Song and Courage in My Heart"; Transliteration: "Kono Kyoku to, Soshite Yūki o Mune ni" (Japanese: この曲と、そして勇気を胸に)	Yūsuke Shintani	Fumiaki Maruto	Daisuke Yoshida	November 9, 2025
7	"Irrational Encounter"; Transliteration: "Fugōrina Kaikō" (Japanese: 不合理な邂逅)	Lee Jeong-Muk	Takashi Tanaka	Kayonaka Yamada	November 16, 2025
8	"Light and Darkness After the Festival"; Transliteration: "Matsuri no Nochi no Hikari to Yami to" (Japanese: 祭りの後の光と闇と)	Lee Jeong-Muk	Takashi Tanaka	Shinji Itadaki	November 23, 2025
9	"I Want to See Your Gentle Smile Again"; Transliteration: "Mōichido, Yasashī Egao no Kimi ni Aitai" (Japanese: もう一度、優しい笑顔の君に会いたい)	Yūsuke Shintani, Norihiro Udono & Lee Jeong-Muk	Takashi Tanaka	Daisuke Yoshida	November 30, 2025
10	"The Sixth SI-VIS"; Transliteration: "Roku Ninme no SI-VIS" (Japanese: 六人目のSI-VIS)	Yūsuke Shintani	Fumiaki Maruto	Shinji Itadaki	December 7, 2025
11	"A Diva and a Knight"; Transliteration: "Utahime to Kishi" (Japanese: 歌姫と騎士)	Norihiro Udono	Fumiaki Maruto	Shinji Itadaki	December 14, 2025
12	"The Last Remaining Despair"; Transliteration: "Saigo ni Nokotta Zetsubōyo" (Japanese: 最後に残った絶望よ)	Junichi Fujise	Fumiaki Maruto	Daisuke Yoshida	December 21, 2025
13	"Dejection and Determination"; Transliteration: "Sorezore no Shitsui to Ketsui" (Japanese: それぞれの失意と決意)	Norihiro Udono	Fumiaki Maruto	Kayonaka Yamada	January 4, 2026
14	"Come Back to Life, My Friend"; Transliteration: "Tomoyo Atsuku Yomigaere" (Japanese: 親友(とも)よ熱く蘇れ)	Lee Jeong-Muk	Fumiaki Maruto	Shinji Itadaki	January 11, 2026
15	"Because I Am SI-VIS"; Transliteration: "Datte Watashi wa SI-VIS Dakara" (Japanese: だってわたしは SI-VIS だから)	Yūsuke Shintani	Fumiaki Maruto	Shinji Itadaki	January 18, 2026
16	"Welcome to Labyrinth"; Transliteration: "Rabirinsu e Yōkoso" (Japanese: 迷宮(ラビリンス)へようこそ)	Lee Jeong-Muk	Fumiaki Maruto	Shinji Itadaki	January 25, 2026
17	"Wishes and Songs Will Be Heard"; Transliteration: "Omoi wa Todoku, Uta wa Todoku" (Japanese: 想いは届く、歌は届く)	Junichi Fujise	Fumiaki Maruto	Hiroshi Kashina	February 1, 2026
18	"Bring Despair to the Earth, and…" Transliteration: "Chikyū ni Zetsubō o, Soshite……" (Japanese: 地球に絶望を、そして……)	Norihiro Udono	Fumiaki Maruto	Shinji Itadaki	February 8, 2026
19	"Accelerating Collapse"; Transliteration: "Kasoku Shiteiku Hōkai" (Japanese: 加速していく崩壊)	Lee Jeong-Muk	Fumiaki Maruto	Shinji Itadaki	February 15, 2026
20	"Future After Revenge"; Transliteration: "Fukushū no Hate no Mirai" (Japanese: 復讐の果ての未来)	Lee Jeong-Muk	Fumiaki Maruto	Shinji Itadaki	February 22, 2026
