= Studio VOLN =

Japanese animation studio

Studio VOLN Co., Ltd.
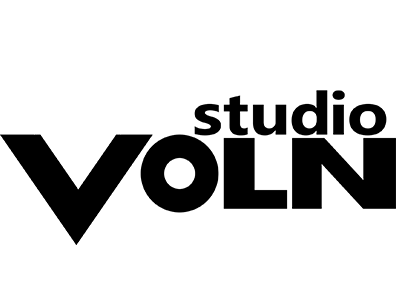
- Native name: 株式会社 studio VOLN
- Romanized name: Kabushiki-gaisha Sutujio VORUN
- Type: Kabushiki gaisha
- Industry: Japanese animation
- Founded: August 12, 2014; 12 years ago
- Founder: Keiji Mita
- Headquarters: Suginami, Tokyo, Japan
- Key people: Keiji Mita (CEO)
- Website: www.voln.co.jp

Studio VOLN Co., Ltd. (Japanese: 株式会社 studio VOLN, Hepburn: Kabushiki-gaisha Sutujio VORUN) is a Japanese animation studio that animates and produces anime television series and films.

The company's name, "VOLN", is an acronym for "Visiting Old Learn New".

== Establishment ==
The studio was founded on August 12, 2014, by ex-Madhouse producer and director Keiji Mita, who currently heads the company as its president and representative. The studio's first two animated series, an adaptation of the manga series Ushio & Tora and Idol Incidents, were co-productions with MAPPA. Since then, it started to produce its own works, including a theatrical anime film version of the 2015 novel I Want to Eat Your Pancreas. Animator Abiru Takahiko was one of the studio's animation directors for a time.

== Works ==
The list below is a list of Studio VOLN's works as a lead animation studio.

=== Anime television series ===
Title	Director(s)	First run start date	First run end date	Eps	Note(s)	Ref(s)
Ushio & Tora	Satoshi Nishimura	July 3, 2015	June 24, 2016	39	Adaptation of a manga series by Kazuhiro Fujita. Co-animated with MAPPA.	
Idol Incidents	Daisuke Yoshida	January 8, 2017	March 27, 2017	12	Based on a mixed media project by MAGES. Co-animated with MAPPA.	
Karakuri Circus	Satoshi Nishimura	October 11, 2018	June 27, 2019	36	Adaptation of a manga series by Kazuhiro Fujita.	
Back Arrow	Gorō Taniguchi	January 9, 2021	June 19, 2021	24	Original work.	
Blue Exorcist: Shimane Illuminati Saga	Daisuke Yoshida	January 7, 2024	March 24, 2024	12	Sequel to Blue Exorcist: Kyoto Saga.	
Blue Exorcist: Beyond the Snow Saga / The Blue Night Saga	Daisuke Yoshida	October 6, 2024	March 23, 2025	24	Sequel to Blue Exorcist: Shimane Illuminati Saga.	
Si-Vis: The Sound of Heroes	Daisuke Yoshida	October 5, 2025	March 29, 2026	24	Original work.	

=== Films ===
Title	Director(s)	Release date	Note(s)	Ref(s)
I Want to Eat Your Pancreas	Shin'ichirō Ushijima	September 1, 2018	Adaptation of a novel by Yoru Sumino.	
Garo: The Fleeting Cherry Blossom	Satoshi Nishimura	October 6, 2018	Part of the Garo: Crimson Moon series Co-animated with Studio M2.	
