= Let Me Eat Your Pancreas (film) =

2017 Japanese live action film

- Theatrical release poster

Japanese name
- Kanji: 君の膵臓をたべたい
Transcriptions
- Revised Hepburn: Kimi no Suizō o Tabetai
- Directed by: Sho Tsukikawa
- Screenplay by: Tomoko Yoshida
- Based on: I Want to Eat Your Pancreas by Yoru Sumino
- Produced by: Akira Kobe; Kazuaki Kishida
- Starring: Minami Hamabe; Takumi Kitamura; Keiko Kitagawa; Shun Oguri
- Cinematography: Hiroo Yanagida
- Edited by: Junnosuke Hogaki
- Music by: Suguru Matsutani
- Production companies: Toho Pictures, Inc.
- Distributed by: Toho
- Release date: July 28, 2017 (Japan)
- Running time: 115 minutes
- Country: Japan
- Language: Japanese
- Box office: $39.1 million

Let Me Eat Your Pancreas (Japanese: 君の膵臓をたべたい, Hepburn: Kimi no Suizō o Tabetai) is a 2017 Japanese romance drama film starring Minami Hamabe, Takumi Kitamura, Keiko Kitagawa and Shun Oguri. Directed by Sho Tsukikawa, it is based on the 2015 novel I Want to Eat Your Pancreas by Yoru Sumino.

== Plot ==
An introvert boy, Haruki Shiga, comes across a book in a hospital waiting room. Looking through the book, he discovers that it is a diary kept by his very popular classmate, a girl. The girl, Sakura Yamauchi, happens to see him holding her diary and reveals to him that she is secretly suffering from pancreatic cancer.

Sakura then playfully forces Haruki to attend to all her whims and fancies. Initially, Haruki begrudgingly accedes to her requests, citing the excuse that he is merely putting up with a sick classmate. However, as time passes, he finds himself being drawn to her and he begins to enjoy the time he spends with her.

== Cast ==
- Minami Hamabe as Sakura Yamauchi
- Takumi Kitamura as Haruki Shiga
  - Shun Oguri as adult Haruki
- Karen Ōtomo as Kyōko Takimoto
  - Keiko Kitagawa as adult Kyōko
- Yūma Yamoto as Gamu-kun
  - Yusuke Kamiji as adult Gamu-kun
- Dori Sakurada as Takahiro
- Daichi Morishita as Kuriyama
- Satomi Nagano as Sakura's mother

== Box office ==
In Japan, the film grossed ¥3.52 billion ($31.38 million), becoming the fifth highest-grossing domestic film of 2017. Overseas, the film grossed $3.6 million in China, $3,457,444 in South Korea, $277,019 in the United States and Canada, and $115,494 in Spain, Thailand and Australia. This brings the film's total worldwide gross to $39,129,957.

== Awards ==
Award	Category	Nominee	Result
42nd Hochi Film Award	Best Picture	Let Me Eat Your Pancreas	Nominated
42nd Hochi Film Award	Best Supporting Actor	Shun Oguri	Nominated
42nd Hochi Film Award	Best New Artist	Minami Hamabe	Won
42nd Hochi Film Award	Best New Artist	Takumi Kitamura	Won
30th Nikkan Sports Film Award	Best Film	Let Me Eat Your Pancreas	Nominated
30th Nikkan Sports Film Award	Best Actress	Minami Hamabe	Nominated
30th Nikkan Sports Film Award	Best Newcomer	Minami Hamabe	Won
30th Nikkan Sports Film Award	Best Newcomer	Takumi Kitamura	Nominated
72nd Mainichi Film Awards	Best New Actor	Takumi Kitamura	Nominated
72nd Mainichi Film Awards	Best New Actress	Minami Hamabe	Nominated
60th Blue Ribbon Awards	Best Film	Let Me Eat Your Pancreas	Nominated
60th Blue Ribbon Awards	Best Supporting Actor	Shun Oguri	Nominated
60th Blue Ribbon Awards	Best Newcomer	Minami Hamabe	Nominated
60th Blue Ribbon Awards	Best Newcomer	Takumi Kitamura	Nominated
27th Tokyo Sports Film Award	Best Newcomer	Minami Hamabe	Nominated
27th Tokyo Sports Film Award	Best Newcomer	Takumi Kitamura	Nominated
41st Japan Academy Prize	Picture of the Year	Let Me Eat Your Pancreas	Nominated
41st Japan Academy Prize	Newcomer of the Year	Minami Hamabe	Won
41st Japan Academy Prize	Newcomer of the Year	Takumi Kitamura	Won
