= Khoi Dao =

American voice actor

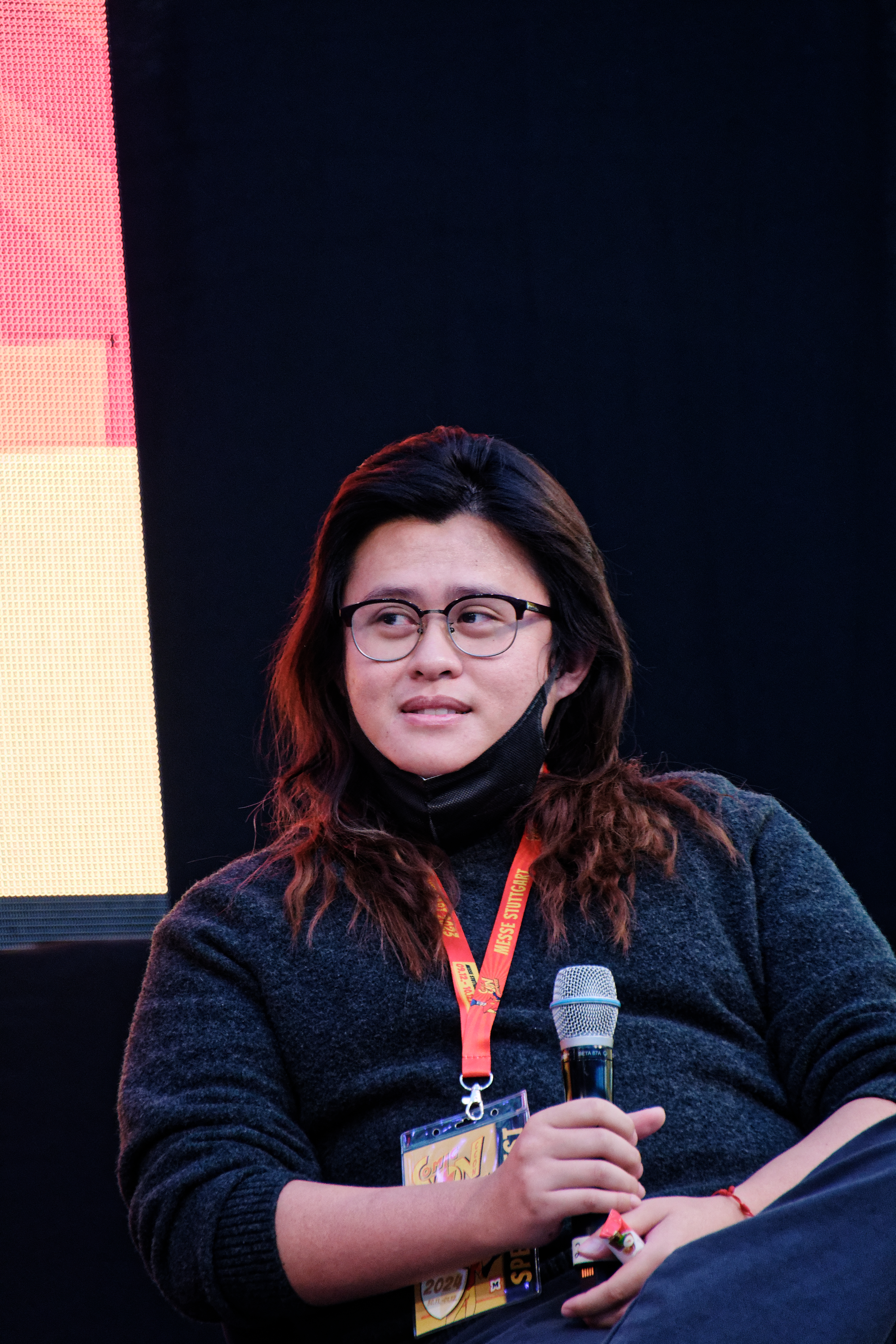
- Born: September 3 Vietnam
- Occupation: Voice actor
- Years active: 2015–present

Khoi Dao (born September 3) is an American voice actor.

== Filmography ==
=== Animation ===
Year	Title	Role	Notes	Source
2022	Ejen Ali	Khai	Disney+ Hotstar English dub	

=== Anime ===
Year	Title	Role	Notes	Source
2017	March Comes In like a Lion	Rei Kiriyama		Resume
2018	Sword Gai	Gai Ogata		
2018	Sirius the Jaeger	Yuily Jirov		
2018	The Testament of Sister New Devil BURST	Luka		
2018	Beyblade Burst	Free De La Hoya	Turbo-QuadStrike	
2019	Sword Art Online: Alicization	Iskahn		
2019	Gundam Build Divers	Tsukasa Shiba		
2019	Mob Psycho 100	Additional Voices		Resume
2019	Cells at Work!	Cancer Cell		
2021	Kuroko's Basketball	Tetsuya Kuroko	Netflix English dub	
2021	My Hero Academia	Geten		
2021	2.43: Seiin High School Boys Volleyball Team	Akito Kanno		
2021	Pokémon Master Journeys: The Series	Rinto	Netflix English dub	
2022	Tokyo 24th Ward	Kunai		
2022	Ghost in the Shell: SAC_2045	Shinjo	Netflix English dub	
2022	Love Live! Superstar!!	Manmaru		
2022	Life with an Ordinary Guy Who Reincarnated into a Total Fantasy Knockout	Hinata Tachibana (Male)		
2024	Kimi ni Todoke	Shōta Kazehaya		
2024	Mission: Yozakura Family	Kengo Yozakura	Hulu English dub	
2024	Re:Zero 3rd Season	Regulus Corneas	Replacing Kyle McCarley	
2025	Tougen Anki	Jin Kougasaki		
2026	Fate/strange Fake	Flat Escardos		

=== Film ===
Year	Title	Role	Notes	Source
2017	Sword Art Online The Movie: Ordinal Scale	Additional Voices		Resume
2019	I Want to Eat Your Pancreas	Gum Boy		
2021	Detective Conan: The Fist of Blue Sapphire	Rishi Ramanathan		
2023	Godzilla Minus One	Shirō Mizushima	2024 Netflix English dub, originally played by Yuki Yamada	

=== Video games ===
Year	Title	Role	Notes	Source
2017	Mary Skelter: Nightmares	Jack		Resume
2018	Detective Pikachu	Tim Goodman		
2019	Zanki Zero: Last Beginning	Ryo Mikajime		
2019	Pokémon Masters	Paulo		
2019	Fire Emblem Heroes	Nils, Wolt		
2020	Phantasy Star Online 2	Afin, Oza		
2020	Genshin Impact	Albedo		
2021	Shadowverse: Champion's Battle	Mauro Abelard		
2021	Cookie Run: Kingdom	Herb Cookie		
2021	Deathloop	Charlie Montague, 2-B.I.T.		
2021	Lost Judgment	Kenya Oshikiri		
2021	Demon Slayer: Kimetsu no Yaiba – The Hinokami Chronicles	Murata		
2022	Relayer	Halley		
2023	Fire Emblem Engage	Kagetsu		
2023	Master Detective Archives: Rain Code	Desuhiko Thunderbolt		
2023	Octopath Traveler II	Additional voices		
2023	Detective Pikachu Returns	Tim Goodman		
2023	Arknights	Puzzle		
2024	Like a Dragon: Infinite Wealth	Additional voices		
2024	Persona 3 Reload	Additional voices		
2024	Unicorn Overlord	Mercenaries (Type C), additional voices		
2024	Farmagia	Manas, additional voices		
2025	Like a Dragon: Pirate Yakuza in Hawaii	Additional voices		

=== Video on demand ===
Year	Title	Role	Platform	Notes	Ref.
2023	YuYu Hakusho	Yusuke Urameshi	Netflix	English Dub	
