= Sumika (band) =

Japanese rock band

Background information
- Also known as: sumika [camp session]
- Origin: Kawasaki, Kanagawa (10 years ago)
- Genres: Rock
- Years active: 2013–present
- Labels: Muffin Discs (2014–2017); Sony Music Entertainment Japan (2018–present)
- Members: Kenta Kataoka; Tomoyuki Arai; Takayuki Ogawa
- Past members: Junnosuke Kuroda
- Website: www.sumika-official.com

Sumika (stylized as sumika) is a Japanese rock band from Kawasaki, Kanagawa. The band formed as an indie rock band in 2013, before being signed to a major label in 2018. The band is also known as Sumika [camp session] during live performances, which are known for including performances by non-musicians such as filmmakers, photographers, painters, sculptors, architects, potters, and poets. The band's music has also been featured in the anime series Wotakoi: Love is Hard for Otaku, Mix: Meisei Story, Pretty Boy Detective Club, Delicious in Dungeon, and the anime films I Want to Eat Your Pancreas and My Hero Academia: Heroes Rising. The band is affiliated with Sony Music Entertainment Japan.

== History ==
Sumika was formed in Kawasaki, Kanagawa, in May 2013. The group's name is derived from the Japanese word sumika (すみか, residence), and refers to the desire of its members to consider the band as their "house" or their "room". The original members were Kenta Kataoka, Junnosuke Kuroda, and Tomoyuki Arai. Takayuki Ogawa, who had previously performed with the group as a guest member, joined the group full-time in 2015.

Sumika debuted in 2013 with the release of their first mini-album Shinsekai Orichalcum (新世界オリハルコン) in October of that year. Their second mini-album I Co Y was released in November 2014 and peaked at number 59 on the Oricon weekly charts. Their third mini-album Vital Apartment was released in June 2015 and peaked at number 32 on the Oricon weekly charts. In 2016, they released the single "Lovers/Dengon Uta" (Lovers/「伝言歌」), the mini-album Answer Parade (アンサーパレード), and the extended play "Sally". In 2017, they released their first full-length album Familia, which peaked at number 5 on the Oricon weekly charts and charted for 41 weeks.

Sumika became affiliated with Sony Music Entertainment Japan in 2018. That same year, they released the extended play "Fiction"; the title track was used as the opening theme to the anime television series Wotakoi: Love is Hard for Otaku. This was followed by the release of the single "Fanfare/Shunkashuutou" (ファンファーレ / 春夏秋冬) in August; The release's two songs were used in the anime film I Want to Eat Your Pancreas, and the band's members also made voice acting appearances in the film.

On February 24, 2023, it was announced that guitarist Junnosuke Kuroda died the day prior, at the age of 34.

== Members ==
Current members

- Kenta Kataoka (片岡 健太, Kataoka Kenta) – lead vocals, guitarist
- Tomoyuki Arai (荒井 智之, Arai Tomoyuki) – drummer
- Takayuki Ogawa (小川 貴之, Ogawa Takayuki) – keyboardist, chorus vocals

Past members

- Junnosuke Kuroda (黒田 隼之介, Kuroda Junnosuke; died 2023) – guitarist, chorus vocals

== Discography ==
=== Albums ===
List of albums, with selected chart positions
Title	Peak Oricon position
Shinsekai Orichalcum (新世界オリハルコン): Release date: October 16, 2013	—
I co Y: Release date: November 12, 2014	59
Vital Apartment: Release date: June 10, 2015	32
Answer Parade (アンサーパレード): Release date: May 25, 2016	12
Familia: Release date: July 12, 2017	5
Chime: Release date: March 13, 2019	5
AMusic: Release date: March 3, 2021	3
For.: Release date: September 21, 2022	5
Sugar Salt Pepper Green: Release date: September 21, 2022	18
Vermillion's: Release date: March 5, 2025	6

=== Singles ===
==== Independent releases ====
Title	Peak Oricon position
"Dress farm #1": Release date: June 6, 2014	—
"Dress farm #2": Release date: June 27, 2014	—
"Lovers/Dengon Uta" (Lovers/「伝言歌」): Release date: March 19, 2016	15
"Sally e.p.": Release date: December 7, 2016	12
"Dress farm #3": Release date: May 18, 2017	—

==== Major releases ====
Title	Peak Oricon position
"Fiction e.p": Release date: April 25, 2018	3
"Fanfare/Shunkashuutou" (ファンファーレ / 春夏秋冬): Release date: August 29, 2018	4
"Equal/Traveling": Release date: June 12, 2019	7
"Negai / Higher Ground": Release date: December 11, 2019	6
"Harmonize e.p": Release date: March 4, 2020	5
"Honne/Late Show": Release date: January 6, 2021	6
"Shake & Shake/Nightwalker": Release date: June 2, 2021	7
"Sound Village": Release date: December 1, 2021	17
"Glitter": Release date: July 27, 2022	12
"Starting Over": Release date: June 7, 2023	6
"Unmei": Release date: April 5, 2024	5
"Vincent": Release date: September 18, 2024	10
"Dang Ding Dong": Release date: December 20, 2024	N/A
"Vermillion": Release date: February 17, 2025	

=== DVDs ===
Title	Peak Oricon position
sumika live tour Starting Caravan 2018.07.01 at Nippon Budokan: Release date: October 24, 2018	4
Music Video Tree Vol.1 & Vol.2: Release date: July 31,2019	4
