= Takumi Kitamura =

Japanese actor (born 1997)

- 北村 匠海
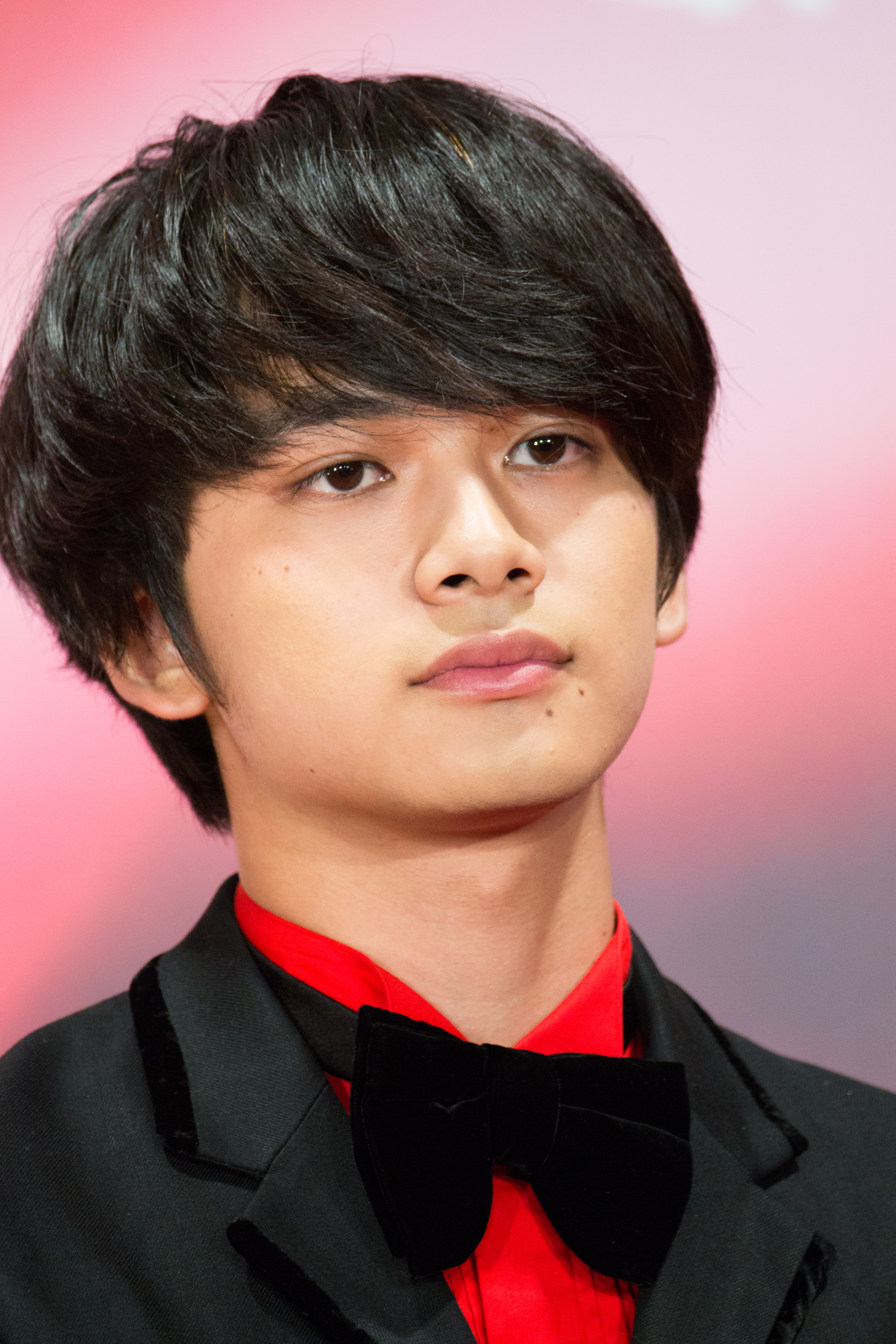
- Kitamura at Opening Ceremony of the Tokyo International Film Festival, 2017
- Born: 3 November 1997 (age 28); Tokyo, Japan
- Other name: Takumi
- Occupations: Actor; singer; model
- Years active: 2007–present
- Agent: Stardust Promotion
- Style: Television drama; film
- Height: 1.77 m (5 ft 10 in)
- Musical career
- Genres: J-pop; Rock
- Instruments: Vocals; Guitar
- Label: Sony Music Records
- Website: Official profile

Takumi Kitamura (Japanese: 北村 匠海, Hepburn: Kitamura Takumi; born November 3, 1997) is a Japanese actor, singer, and model represented by Stardust Promotion's Section 3. He is the leader of Stardust's music collective Ebidan unit Dish. As a member of Dish, he is nicknamed Takumi.

== Biography ==
Kitamura was born on November 3, 1997, in Tokyo. He was scouted by Stardust Promotion when he was in third grade of elementary school.

His first singing debut was "Risu ni Koi Shita Shōnen" in the NHK series Minna no Uta in February and March 2008. Later in June Kitamura's first film appearance was Dive!!. He won the 2009 Reader Model Award of the magazine Shōgaku Rokunensei in 2009. In the summer of 2010, Kitamura joined the actor unit Ebidan. He later joined Ebidan's dance rock band Dish in December 2011. Kitamura is the leader of the band as its lead vocalist and guitarist.

Takumi recently starred in the live-action film Tokyo Revengers. The film received positive reviews, and is one of the highest grossing Japanese films of 2021.

== Discography ==
=== Singles ===
Year	Title	Notes
2008	"Risu ni Koi Shita Shōnen"	As Takumi Kitamura & Toshiaki Matsumoto

== Filmography ==
=== Films ===
Year	Title	Role	Notes	Ref.
2008	Dive!!	Yoichi Fujitani (child)		
2008	School Days with a Pig	Takumi Kishimoto		
2009	Jūryoku Pierrot	Haru Okuno (child)		
2009	Tajomaru	Naomitsu Hatakeyama (child)		
2009	Shizumanu Taiyō	Katsumi Onchi (child)		
2010	Surely Someday	Takumi Kishi (child)		
2011	Ninja Kids!!!	Tamura Mikiemon		
2012	Sorairo Monogatari: Nike to katatsumuri		Omnibus film	
2013	Suzuki Sensei	Masa Izumi		
2013	Girl in the Sunny Place	Kosuke Okuda (middle school)		
2016	Sailor Suit and Machine Gun: Graduation	Shuhei		
2016	Sing My Life	Tsubasa Seyama		
2016	Destruction Babies	Kenji		
2017	Let Me Eat Your Pancreas	Haruki Shiga	Lead role	
2017	Love and Lies	Yūto Shiba		
2017	Tremble All You Want	Ichi		
2018	Over Drive	Akira Shinkai		
2018	Waiting for Spring	Towa Asakura		
2019	You Shine in the Moonlit Night	Takuya Okada	Lead role	
2019	12 Suicidal Teens	Nobuo		
2019	Hello World	Naomi Katagaki (voice)	Lead role	
2019	Shadowfall	Keiji		
2019	Seven Days War	Mamoru Suzuhara (voice)	Lead role	
2020	Sakura	Kaoru Hasegawa	Lead role	
2020	Love Me, Love Me Not	Rio Yamamoto	Lead role	
2020	Love Me, Love Me Not: The Animation	A student (voice)	Cameo	
2020	Our 30-Minute Sessions	Sōta Kubota	Lead role	
2020	Tonkatsu DJ Agetarō	Agetarō Katsumata	Lead role	
2020	Underdog Part 1	Ōmura		
2020	Underdog Part 2	Ōmura		
2021	My Blood & Bones in a Flowing Galaxy	Arashi		
2021	Tokyo Revengers	Takemichi Hanagaki	Lead role	
2022	Tombi: Father and Son	Akira Ichikawa		
2022	The End of the Pale Hour	I	Lead role	
2022	I Am What I Am	Amato		
2022	Lonely Castle in the Mirror	Rion (voice)		
2023	Tokyo Revengers 2: Bloody Halloween Part 1	Takemichi Hanagaki	Lead role	
2023	Tokyo Revengers 2: Bloody Halloween Part 2	Takemichi Hanagaki	Lead role	
2023	Scroll	I	Lead role	
2023	The Innocent Game	Kaoru Yūki		
2024	Crayon Shin-chan the Movie: Our Dinosaur Diary	Billy (voice)		
2025	Kaneko's Commissary	Takashi Kojima		
2025	A Bad Summer	Mamoru Sasaki	Lead role	
2025	Baka's Identity	Takuya Matsumoto	Lead role	
2026	Until We Meet Again	Ryota Yanagisawa		
2026	Numb	Daichi	Lead role	
2026	Sakamoto Days	Nagumo		
2026	Shadow Work			
2026	Your Story: Kimi No Hanashi	Chihiro	Lead role	

=== Television drama ===
Year	Title	Role	Notes	Ref.
2008	Homeroom on the Beachside	Hiroki Negishi (child)	Episode 4	
2008	Joshidai Nama Kaikeishi no Jiken-bo	Ichiasa Kakimoto (child)	Episode 9	
2009	Tomica Hero: Rescue Fire	Kota	Episode 29	
2009	Anti-Terrorism Investigators	Kenji Juhon (child)		
2011	Suzuki Sensei	Masa Izumi		
2012	Taira no Kiyomori	Emperor Konoe	Taiga drama	
2012	Pillow Talk: Bed no Omowaku	Motoki	Episode 11	
2013	Aibō Season 11	Yusuke Aizawa	Episode 14	
2014	Nobunaga Concerto	Katsuzo Mori	Episode 8	
2015	Tenshi no Knife	Kazuya Sawamura		
2016	Yutoridesuga nanika	Shigeru Kogure	Episodes 3 to 6, 8, 10	
2016	Brass Dreams	Keita Abo		
2017	Zutto Waratteta	Sanma Akashiya	Short drama	
2018	Residential Complex	Saku Aoki		
2019	The Good Wife	Kōtarō Asahi		
2020	Love Begins When the Money Ends	Jun Itagaki	Miniseries	
2021	Nizi Village Clinic	Taiyou Aoyama		
2021	Night Doctor	Shun Sakuraba		
2021	Kyojo 2	Akihiro Tōno	Miniseries	
2022	Don't Call It Mystery	Jūto	Episodes 11 and 12	
2022	One Night, She Thinks of the Dawn	He	Lead role	
2023	On a Starry Night	Issei Hiiragi		
2023	Kazama Kimichika: Kyojo Zero	Akihiro Tōno		
2023	Kissing the Ring Finger	Sakuraba Arata	Episodes 3, 8 and 10	
2023	YuYu Hakusho	Yusuke Urameshi	Lead role	
2024	Antihero	Shūto Akamine		
2025	Anpan	Takashi Yanai	Asadora	
2025	Just a Bit Espers	Ichimatsu		
2026	Song of the Samurai	Takasugi Shinsaku		
2026	Canned Mackerel Heads to Space	Shunichi Asano	Lead role	

=== Other television ===
Year	Title	Notes	Ref.
2025	76th NHK Kōhaku Uta Gassen	He sang several songs with his co-stars from the TV drama Anpan.	

== Awards and nominations ==
Year	Award	Category	Work	Result	Ref.
2017	42nd Hochi Film Awards	Best New Artist	Let Me Eat Your Pancreas	Won	
2017	30th Nikkan Sports Film Awards	Best Newcomer	Let Me Eat Your Pancreas	Nominated	
2018	72nd Mainichi Film Awards	Best New Actor	Let Me Eat Your Pancreas	Nominated	
2018	60th Blue Ribbon Awards	Best Newcomer	Let Me Eat Your Pancreas	Nominated	
2018	27th Tokyo Sports Film Awards	Best Newcomer	Let Me Eat Your Pancreas	Nominated	
2018	41st Japan Academy Film Prize	Newcomer of the Year	Let Me Eat Your Pancreas	Won	
2018	13th Osaka Cinema Festival	Best New Actor	Let Me Eat Your Pancreas	Won	
2020	45th Hochi Film Awards	Best Supporting Actor	Underdog	Nominated	
2021	75th Mainichi Film Awards	Best Supporting Actor	Underdog	Nominated	
2021	Elle Cinema Awards 2021	Elle Men Award	Tokyo Revengers	Won	
2021	45th Elan d'or Awards	Newcomer of the Year	Himself	Won	
2021	GQ Japan Men of the Year 2021	Men of the Year Breakthrough Actor	Himself	Won	
2021	2021 Asia Artist Awards	Best Acting	Himself	Won	
2022	47th Hochi Film Awards	Best Supporting Actor	Tombi: Father and Son	Nominated	
2025	30th Busan International Film Festival	Best Actor Award	Baka's Identity	Won	
2025	38th Nikkan Sports Film Awards	Best Actor	Baka's Identity and A Bad Summer	Nominated	
2026	68th Blue Ribbon Awards	Best Actor	Baka's Identity	Nominated	
