= Back Arrow =

Japanese anime television series

- First Blu-ray volume cover, featuring Back Arrow

バック・アロウ (Bakku Arō)
- Genre: Mecha
- Created by: Gorō Taniguchi; Kazuki Nakashima; Aniplex
- Anime television series
- Directed by: Gorō Taniguchi
- Written by: Kazuki Nakashima
- Music by: Kōhei Tanaka
- Studio: Studio VOLN
- Licensed by: Crunchyroll
- Original network: Tokyo MX, GTV, GYT, BS11, ABC
- English network: US: Crunchyroll Channel
- Original run: January 9, 2021 – June 19, 2021
- Episodes: 24
- icon

Back Arrow (Japanese: バック・アロウ, Hepburn: Bakku Arō) is an original Japanese anime series produced by Studio VOLN, directed by Gorō Taniguchi and written by Kazuki Nakashima. The series aired from January to June 2021.

== Plot ==
The series takes place in the land of Lingalind (リンガリンド, Ringarindo), a continent completely surrounded by a massive wall. The people of Lingalind revere the wall as a god, believing that all of existence is contained within and that the wall protects and provides for its inhabitants. While the land consists of several territories, it is mostly dominated by two powerful nations: The Republic of Lutoh (リュート卿和国, Ryutō Kyōwakoku), which values intelligence and diplomacy, and The Empire of Rekka (レッカ凱帝国, Rekka Kai Teikoku), which values honor and strength. These two nations are in constant conflict with each other over obtaining land and Rakuho (ラクホウ) capsules, which are sent from an unknown location once per month and land in predetermined regions of Lingalind, containing provisions and weapons that the people of Lingalind consider gifts from the wall. Some of these capsules contain devices known as Bind Warpers, metallic armbands that allow one to summon and control a giant mechanical armor known as a Briheight (ブライハイト, Buraihaito). A Briheight's appearance and abilities are tied to one's Conviction (信念, Shin'en), the thing they believe in above all else. Conviction is also recognized as an energy that flows throughout the world, powering various forms of advanced technology found within Lingalind and granting some people special abilities outside of operating a Briheight. Being defeated in battle while controlling a Briheight causes the user to disappear.

One day after a Rakuho is recovered by Rekka forces, a previously unheard-of second Rakuho lands in Edger Village on the outskirts of Lingalind's Iki region. Inside is an amnesiac young man whose only memory is that he is from "beyond the wall." Taking the name "Back Arrow," he seeks to journey back over the wall to restore his memory, entangling himself in the conflict between the two nations.

== Production and release ==
The original anime television series was announced on December 28, 2019, and was produced by Studio VOLN. The series was directed by Goro Taniguchi and written by Kazuki Nakashima. Kōhei Tanaka composed the music and character designs were provided by Shinobu Ohtaka and Toshiyuki Kanno. The series aired from January 9 to June 19, 2021, with the series running for two cours (seasons). (Note: Tokyo MX listed the series premiere at 24:00 on January 8, 2021, which is at midnight on January 9.) The opening theme is "dawn" performed by Lisa, while the ending theme is "The End of the World" (セカイノハテ, "Sekai no Hate") performed by Shuka Saitō. The second opening theme is "Heartbeat" (鼓動, "Kodō") performed by Eir Aoi, while the ending theme is "United Sparrows" performed by Flow. Funimation licensed the series and streamed it on its website in North America and the British Isles, in Europe through Wakanim, and in Australia and New Zealand through AnimeLab. On April 22, 2021, Funimation announced the series would receive an English dub, with the first two episodes premiering the next day. Following Sony's acquisition of Crunchyroll, the series was moved to Crunchyroll.

== Episodes ==
| No. | Title (Note: All English titles are taken from Funimation.) | Directed by | Written by | Original release date |
|---|---|---|---|---|
| 1 | "Do Guys From the Sky Have Undies?"; Transliteration: "Tonde Kita Otoko ni Pantsu wa Aru ka" (Japanese: 飛んで来た男にパンツはあるか) | Daisuke Yoshida | Kazuki Nakashima | January 9, 2021 |
General Kai Rhodan of Rekka claims a "Rakuho" which lands near the Lutoh Republic border containing a cache full of Bind Warpers. A Lutoh unit of Briheights soon arrive, but he defeats them by becoming a Briheight himself. A second Rakuho is then seen streaking across the sky, heading for uninhabited Iki Territory and Rekka High Diviner, Shu Bi, goes to investigate with warrior Ren Sin providing support. The second capsule lands in the remote Edgar Village. Villager Bit Namital suspects there's food inside, so the villagers start boiling the capsule while Shu Bi watches from afar. The capsule opens and a naked youth jumps out, recalling only that he came from "beyond the Wall", much to everyone's disbelief. Suddenly, a bandit attacks the village and uses his Briheight to obtain the Rakuho treasure. The sheriff, Atlee Ariel, attempts to defend the village and stop the destruction with her own Briheight, but she is trapped by the bandit. The naked youth grabs a Bind Warper from his capsule and transforms into a unique Briheight, Muga, rescuing Atlee and destroying both the bandit's Briheight and Bind Warper, although unusually the bandit survives. Bit has repeatedly called the naked youth an idiot, a "bakayaro!", which the young man mistakenly hears as "Back Arrow", and takes it as his name.
| 2 | "Is Having Dreams a Burden?"; Transliteration: "Yume wa Mattaku Meiwaku na no ka" (Japanese: 夢はまったく迷惑なのか) | Won Chang hee | Kazuki Nakashima | January 16, 2021 |
Back Arrow heads off for the distant Wall in his Briheight Muga, but when the falls from exhaustion hours later, Shu Bi and Ren Sin catch up with him. Shu Bi offers to help him in a few days and returns him to Edgar Village. There, Back Arrow learns about village life and the conflict between Rekka and Lutoh. Shu Bi returns to the Rekka capital to carry out research at the Banned Text Archive. Meanwhile in Maestrog Castle in the capital of Lutoh, the bandit displays his broken Bind Warper and relates his experience with the naked youth and destruction of his Briheight. Princess Fine Forte sees the appearance of the foreigner as a potential for world peace, however the Lutoh military force the Iki president to retrieve the foreigner and destroy the Edgar Village. Tyrone Duster of the Iki defense force arrives at the village and begins to destroy it, but Atlee uses her inherited Bind Warper to invoke her Briheight, "Ryuju", but is ineffective. Sheriff Elsha finds another Bind Warper in Back Arrow's capsule and transforms into her own Briheight, "Shadoh", to defend the village, but is into a cavern. Back Arrow invokes his Briheight Muga and defeats Duster's Briheight and breaks Duster's Bind Warper, but again this does not cause the death of the wearer. Back in Rekka capital Shu Bi discovers an ancient text containing a prophecy that when a newcomer achieves self realization, the world will be destroyed.
| 3 | "Does a Huge Ship Bring Hope?"; Transliteration: "Kyodai na Fune wa Kibō ni Naru ka" (Japanese: 巨大な城艦は希望になるか) | Jun'ichi Fujise | Kazuki Nakashima | January 23, 2021 |
Elsha's Briheight, Shadoh, emerges from underground, connected as a figurehead to the huge flying battleship Granedger. Together with Back Arrow's battle with Duster, the emerging battleship threatens to destroy Edgar Village and everything in the vicinity. The Rekka emperor, Zetsu Daidan, distributes Bind Warper armbands salvaged from the Rakuho to his troops in an effort to seize the foreigner. Meanwhile, Bit steals Arrow's Bind Warper while he sleeps, and the villagers prepare to hand him over to the Iki president in exchange for a new place to live. That night Atlee tries to release Arrow in return for defending the villagers, but she is stopped by Elsha, and Arrow agrees to remain a prisoner. As the Edgar villagers are transported towards their new location on the Granedger piloted by Elsha, Bit joins the Iki military in frustration in response to Elsha expressing her disappointment in him, at the departure of the villagers. Iki's president orders his forces fire cannons to destroy Granedger to avoid the ship falling into the hands of either Rekka or Lutoh, leaving Bit horrified. Bit throws Arrow his Bind Warper whereupon Arrow invokes his Briheight and saves the ship. Arrow and Bit then leave with the villagers to find a new homeland. When Emperor Daidan learns of the ancient prophecy, Shu Bi offers to capture Arrow himself.
| 4 | "Does Genius Come When Least Expected?"; Transliteration: "Tensai wa Wasureta Koro ni Yatte Kuru no ka" (Japanese: 天才は忘れた頃にやってくるのか) | Tomohisa Onoue | Kazuki Nakashima | January 30, 2021 |
A flashback to fifteen years earlier shows the young friends Shu and Kai, along with other children from their poor village, being offered to Rekka in lieu of paying taxes and forced to become soldiers. Shu decides to exploit the opportunity to succeed and change the Rekka system from within. In the present, the mercenary group of Four Friends attack and breach a Lutoh border outpost in the "Neutral Zone". Meanwhile, Sol Athin suggests the Granedger dreadnaught follows a path through the neutral zone used by traders as the best way to reach the Wall in the north. They are soon confronted by Shu and Ren with Rekka forces who launch an attack. Atlee and Arrow invoke their Briheights to engage the troops while Elsha attempts to steer the Granedger towards Bandkia in the northeast. The Four Friends invoke their Briheights and use a "decouple" spray to halt the Granedger. (Note: Liquid metals flow underground in Lingalind like rivers, and metal devices like the Granedger dreadnaught use its magnetic attraction and repulsion to float and move. Decouple spray temporarily neutralizes the effect for about one hour.) Facing defeat, Arrow clones his Briheight into four separate versions and attacks and defeats the Four Friends' Briheights, returning them to their human forms. Shu surmises that without a single "conviction" Arrow is not limited to a single Briheight. Shu suddenly disables all of the Rekka army's weapons and Briheights, and offers to join Back Arrow and Edgar Village. Impressed by Arrow's powers, Shu orders Ren to return to the Rekka capital and report his betrayal to Zetsu Daidan.
| 5 | "Is Today Yesterday's Tomorrow?"; Transliteration: "Kyō wa Kinō no Asu na no ka" (Japanese: 今日は昨日の明日なのか) | Daisuke Yoshida | Kazuki Nakashima | February 6, 2021 |
A flashback to ten years earlier, Kai and Shu earn the respect of the Rekka emperor by finding a Rakuho and defeating rebel troops. In the present Kai sets off to confront Shu and finds him in the company of the Edgar villagers aboard the Granedger. Shu refuses to return to Rekka and Kai prepares to kill him, but Back intercepts him and they both invoke their Briheights. However, Shu has Dr. Sola Athin fire a particle cannon from the Granedger towards the capital. Expulsions rack the capital and Kai decides to return, but vows that his former friend Shu is now his enemy. Shu then reveals that he had remotely detonated pre-prepared explosives in the capital and that they should head for the north wall before the deception is discovered. In the capital, Ren Sin agrees to now serve Kai Rhodan.
| 6 | "Are Pretty Boy Farms a Thing?"; Transliteration: "Bishōnen Bokujōtte Maji na no ka" (Japanese: 美少年牧場ってマジなのか) | Won Chang hee | Kazuki Nakashima | February 13, 2021 |
The Granedger continues on its way under the guidance of Shu. Meanwhile in Rekka, Kai has imprisoned himself to increase his conviction to defeat Shu. Prime Minister Tae appoints Kyo, the Minister of Defense as Head Diviner, and he investigates whether the explosions were truly caused by the power of the Granedger. The Granedger bypasses Lutoh and approaches the autonomous Walston Province, but is attacked by a Briheight controlled by a weakened handsome "pretty boy" called Bruh. Back Arrow easily defeats Bruh, and the boy takes the Edger leaders back to his farm which is inhabited solely by escaped Pretty Boys. They had all been bred specifically by Lord Walston as livestock for his cruel experiments to enhance conviction. Shu decides to visit Lord Walston and offers to have Back Arrow defeat the Pretty Boys in exchange for free passage. However, it is a ruse, and when Walston's army attacks the farm, Bruh creates a smoke screen and the boys steal all Walston's Bind Warpers then surround him with Briheights. Walston surrenders and the Granedger continues through Walston Province.
| 7 | "Is the Wall Really That Solid?"; Transliteration: "Kabe wa Sonna ni Katai no ka" (Japanese: 壁はそんなに堅いのか) | Jun'ichi Fujise | Kazuki Nakashima | February 20, 2021 |
As the Granedger approaches the wall in the north through the neutral zone, it is monitored by Rekka's North General, Bai Toatsu. In the Lutoh capital, Princess Fine Forte admonishes Lord Walston for carrying out unauthorized experiments on the Pretty Boys and for attacking the Granedger without her authority. Walston is unrepentant until Commander Prax Conrad confronts him and severs his left arm. The Granedger reaches the wall, and Arrow tries to breach it without success, and Shu also fires the particle cannons at the wall, but with no apparent effect. Suddenly large vents open in the wall which emit a blast of wind which threatens the Granedger. Bai Toatsu then decides to attack the ship in his Briheight, but he is intercepted by the flying Briheight of Commander Prax who disarms him. The Rekka Prime Minister, Tae Howa, orders Bai Toatsu to stand down rather than provoke an incident with Lutoh. Prax invites Arrow and the Granedger to Lutoh and Shu accepts, however Arrow decides to stay at the wall.
| 8 | "What is the Bloodstained Knight Hiding?"; Transliteration: "Chimamire no Kishi wa Nani o Himeru no ka" (Japanese: 血まみれの騎士は何を秘めるのか) | Tomohisa Onoue | Kazuki Nakashima | February 27, 2021 |
The Granedger travels to Maestrog Castle in Lutoh at the invitation of Commander Prax Conrad, one of the Six Supremes, while Arrow vainly continues to breach the Wall. Meanwhile at its western border region, the Rekka army continues its military expansion into other territories, leaving only Lutoh unconquered. In Maestrog Castle, the Edger villagers enjoy the hospitality of Princess Fine and she invites them to stay in Lutoh. At the same time, Lutoh officials and Shu bargain over what information they propose to exchange. Prax returns to the wall and manages to capture Arrow and take him to Supreme Scientist Demyne Shaft in Lutoh for analysis. He is rescued by Shu and Bit but a masked Prax tries to recapture them. During the fight, the mask is dislodged and reveals an angry Princess Fine who appears to have a dual personality and she prepares to slaughter them.
| 9 | "Why Do Lips that Profess Love Hide Fangs?"; Transliteration: "Ai o Kataru Kuchibiru wa Naze Kiba o Kakusu no ka" (Japanese: 愛を語る唇はなぜ牙を隠すのか) | Michiru Itabisashi | Kazuki Nakashima | March 6, 2021 |
In her alternate warrior personality, Princess Fine pursues Arrow, Shu and Bit, but Prax intervenes and distracts her, promising to kill them herself to keep Fine's secret. Arrow is too weakened to fight, so he changes to his Briheight and escapes with Shu and Bit. Princess Fine returns to the palace while the Briheight battle between Arrow and Prax continues. They head towards Maestrog Castle and Arrow is forced back to his human form. Before the fight can continue, Dr. Sola arrives and stops Prax, revealing to the others that he is her brother, and responsible for the princess' predicament. He tries to convince Prax not to kill them but she is unconvinced, so Sola sets of a flash bomb and they escape while she is blinded. Later, Sola reveal that his real name is Werner Conrad, and he was forced to leave Lutoh after causing the princess to have a dangerous accident. In Rekka, Emperor Zetsu strips Prime Minister Tae of his position and ill-gotten wealth as he prepares Rekka to invade Lutoh and conquer Lingaland. In a display of power, Zetsu surprisingly challenges the general of the Lustar Emirates to a Briheight contest, but easily destroys his enemy's Briheight with a hand-held weapon. Zetsu then declares war on Lutoh, but Princess Fine publicly changes personality and defiantly insults him.
| 10 | "Can Have-Nots Have Backbone?"; Transliteration: "Motazaru Mono ni mo Iji wa Aru no ka" (Japanese: 持たざる者にも意地はあるのか) | Jun'ichi Fujise | Kazuki Nakashima | March 13, 2021 |
The aggressive Princess Fine declares war on Rekka and orders Demyne Shaft to prepare their armaments. Fritz Kraus finds Arrow, Shu, Bit and Sola, but before he can transform into his Briheight, Dissonanza arrives and takes the group with her to the Depraved Palace, where they meet Elect Supreme Rudolf Conductore, one of the Six Supremes. Meanwhile Princess Fine arranges a contest between Elsha and Prax hoping to acquire the Granedger for her upcoming war if Prax wins. If Elsha refuses, Fine threatens to kill the Edger villagers, so Elsha accepts the challenge and the fight begins. Back Arrow and the others attempt to escape from the Depraved Palace, but are surrounded by Hans Paladin and the Armoured Division Briheights. However, Muga suddenly sprouts wings and he flies off with his friends. Arrow reaches the arena in Lutoh and changes Muga into a sword which Elsha uses to defeat Prax. As Elsha convinces Fine to use her love to overcome her evil persona, Fine loses her temper and uses a Bind Warper to transform into a Briheight, but suddenly her good personality appears and regains control, sealing her other dark personality inside the Bind Warper. Elsha then decides to form an alliance with Fine as an equal leader to protect Lutoh from Rekka.
| 11 | "Is This a Head-to-Head Fight?"; Transliteration: "Makkō Shōbu no Sensō na no ka" (Japanese: 真っ向勝負の戦争なのか) | Kayonaka Yamada | Kazuki Nakashima | March 20, 2021 |
Emperor Zetsu announces a full scale invasion against Lutoh. Lutoh, Secretary Supreme convinces Princess Fine to keep her split personality secret and prepare for war against Rekka in accordance with Rudolf's wishes. Shu assists Demyne Shaft in developing his artificial Bind Warpers to equip the Lutoh army. Baran Sujita advises Fine that Rekka's army is three time the size of theirs and they prepare plans to repel the expected attack at two places, Viola and Siboe. Rekka general Goh Zenga with his Briheight Baryu and General Bai Toatsu with Senpu, lead the assault at Viola which is closest border point to Maestrog Castle. At Siboe, Ren Shin engages Arrow while Kai attacks the Granedger to get to Shu. However Shu had already prepared a strategy to defeat them both, and the Granedger continues on its way to engage Zetsu at Viola. Meanwhile, Prax gains the upper hand over the Rekka generals, but Zetsu unleashes his hand-held Briheight weapon and pins her to the castle wall.
| 12 | "Is Too Much Pride A Problem?"; Transliteration: "Hokori mo Tsumoreba Akuta to Naru ka" (Japanese: 誇りも積もれば芥となるか) | Kuniyasu Nishina | Kazuki Nakashima | March 27, 2021 |
The war between Rekka and Lutoh has begun, with some successes on both sides. Arrow has damaged his hand and preventing him from using his "Saberblow", limiting his fighting ability. Lutoh plans to lure the Rekka army into the Viola canyon in an attempt to destroy the canyon and the enemy. Kai tries to stop the Granedger closing in behind to trap the Rekka army, but he is too weak from his injuries. Ren Sin comes to his rescue in her renamed flying Briheight, Reppu, after her conviction is forcibly reinforced by Zetsu. Kai initially refuses her assistance because of his pride, but she eventually convinces him to utilize her abilities and they merge into a combined flying Briheight called Gigan Reppu. Meanwhile, the Rekka generals are facing defeat from Lutoh and the Granedger, but Kai and Gigan Reppu arrive and he challenges Back Arrow's Muga. They begin to fight for ultimate victory, but as Arrow attacks his injured arm causes him to falter.
| 13 | "Do the Heavens Cry When the Princess Rises?"; Transliteration: "Hime ga Tatsu Toki Ten wa Naku no ka" (Japanese: 姫が立つ時天は泣くのか) | Won Chang hee | Kazuki Nakashima | April 3, 2021 |
The battle between the Rekka and Lutoh Briheights continues. Kai renews his attack on Arrow who is helped by Prax Conrad, while the Rekka generals Goh Zenga and Bai Toatsu attack Elsha who are helped by Hans Paladin and Fritz Kraus of the Prax Armoured Division. The battle is broadcast live back at Lutoh by Supreme Rudolf, showing the Rekka warriors defeating those from Lutoh causing concern among the people. In desperation, Princess Fine summons her Briheight Lovsolute and goes to the battlefield where she re-energizes the Lutoh warriors. However, Zetsu dons multiple Bind Warpers and summons his Briheight Ogen. He approaches Princess Fine and forces her dark aggressive personality to reappear and the two leaders prepare for an all-out battle.
| 14 | "Is There Love on the Battlefield?"; Transliteration: "Sono Senjō ni Ai wa Aru no ka" (Japanese: その戦場に愛はあるのか) | Michiru Itabisashi | Kazuki Nakashima | April 10, 2021 |
The dark Princess Fine attacks Zetsu, but after some initial success, he uses his strong conviction to drain Briheight particles from the area to counter-attack. In desperation, the dark Fine strikes at her own Briheight warriors to absorb their energy but Arrow uses his Saberblow to dissipate her out-of-control conviction and return her to her Lovesolute persona. Meanwhile, Shu withdraws Granedger which the Rekka forces interpret as a retreat, but then Shu exposes Granedger's Super-Dreadnaught Cannon, Granarrow, which combines Granedger's particle cannon with Arrow's Saberblow and it decimates the Rekka Briheight forces. However, the Rekka troops, charge towards Granedger in a suicide attack using only hand-weapons and suffer high casualties. In a surprise move, Fine uses her compassion to heal both the Lutoh and Rekka warrirors and neauralizes Zetsu's Briheight. Admitting defeat, Zetsu agrees to peace between Lutoh and Rekka, although when he returns home he still maintains his ambition for conquest. The Granedger is temporarily disabled in the battlefield following the firing of its cannon so Fine returns to Lutoh with Prax. However, instead of being hailed as a victor and peacemaker, the princess is accused of being a warmonger by the citizens after seeing images of her aggressive alter ego's behavior broadcast by Rudolf.
| 15 | "What Will the Riots Produce?"; Transliteration: "Shikumareta Dōran wa Nani o Umu no ka" (Japanese: 仕組まれた動乱は何を生むのか) | Tomohisa Onoue | Kazuki Nakashima | April 17, 2021 |
The riots in Lutoh become a revolution, and the National Assembly of citizens demands Princess Fine's head. The princess makes an attempt to talk to the crowd, but Dissonanza, masquerading as Back Arrow, kills their leader provoking even more rage among the population. Meanwhile, the Granadger begins to slowly move towards the Lutoh capital. Rudolf proclaims Fine's removal as ruler of Lutoh, and the nobles of the Council agree, with the exception of Prax. Werner tries to kill Rudolf by using a Briheight, but Rudolf reveals that he has plotted against Fine since the beginning and Werner is attacked by a powerful unknown Briheight. With the rebellion gaining momentum, Prax tries to take Fine to safety but she insists on facing her people. Fine is about to be executed but she is rescued by Back Arrow while Prax stays behind to delay Dissonanza. Werner tries to save the Edgar villagers by taking them to the safety of Granedger, but succumbs to the spears of the Lutoh forces and dies. When the Council demands the return of Princess Fine, Atlee proclaims the princess is a political refugee of the Granedger and that from now on it will act as an independent nation, the Granadger United.
| 16 | "When People Want Peace, What Does God Want?"; Transliteration: "Hito ga Heiwa o Nozomu Toki, Kami wa Nani o Hossuru ka" (Japanese: 人が平和を望む時、神は何を欲するか) | Jun'ichi Fujise | Kazuki Nakashima | April 24, 2021 |
Two months after the battle between Lutoh and Rekka at the Caravan Road Neutral Zone, Atlee Ariel is pronounced Granedger United's Queen and Princess Fine offers to act as its councilor. Prax, along with the Lutoh Armored Division and the Pretty Boys join them. Arrow and Shu travel to Rekka seeking an agreement for the Edger people and their allies to settle in the north of the country. They are met by Kyo Meiketsu, Rekka's new Prime Minister following the departure of the disgraced Tae Howa. While they discuss the agreement, a new flying dreadnaught appears and attacks the participants under the command of Tae Howa with the backing of Rudolf Conductore. Meanwhile, as Bit and Elsha race to the control room of the Granedger, they are confronted by a hooded figure who invites them to join the Lind Faith.
| 17 | "Is This How They Rise Up?"; Transliteration: "Kakute Karera wa Tachiagaru no ka" (Japanese: かくて彼らは立ち上がるのか) | Kayonaka Yamada | Kazuki Nakashima | May 1, 2021 |
Tae Howa threatens Rekka and the Edger people in a huge flying dreadnaught with the backing of Rudolf Conductore. Zetsu withdraws Rekka from the talks and Back Arrow attacks the dreadnaught with Muga, but cannot reach Howa who has securely protected himself. Atlee calls Arrow back to Granedger to meet a cloaked member of the Lind Faith who states that The Founder has foretold of Arrow's arrival as the Newcomer and invites him to Epitaph Mountain which is beyond the Wall. Meanwhile, Zetsu in his Briheight Ogen attacks and kills Tae and defeats his dreadnaught. Back in Lutoh, Rudolf gives Peath Glinhouse a Bind Warper which he uses to raise the dreadnaught Maestrog from beneath the city and advances it towards Granedger. Arrow agrees to travel to Epitaph Mountain, but the Maestrog dreadnaught catches up with them. It begin firing its cannons and Peath sends out an army of flying Briheights, however Shu and Arrow transform Granedger into the vertical Granarrow which fires a mighty blast and defeats the Maestrog. With the assistance of the Lind Faith disciple, the Granedger then passes through the Wall, only to discover that there was another wall beyond it.
| 18 | "Is This the World's Truth?"; Transliteration: "Kore ga Sekai no Shinri na no ka" (Japanese: これが世界の真理なのか) | Sō Toyama | Kazuki Nakashima | May 8, 2021 |
Granedger passes through a succession of illusory walls devised to shield the sacred mountain. The dreadnaught travels past columns of faces which appear to be of all those who died in Lingaland, and they see the face of Werner Conrad. A messenger from the Founder of the Lind Faith appears, explaining that Arrow was sent on a mission to destroy Lingaland, but lost his memory. Granedger is suddenly fired upon by the Maestrog dreadnaught which has followed them through the walls. Arrow attacks the Meastrog, and after fighting through its defenses, destroys Peath's Bind Warper, killing someone for the first time. Arrow suddenly releases an unknown force which wipes out all the Bind Warpers on Meastrog and the Lutoh forces wearing them. Rudolf informs the Edger alliance that Arrow was sent by God to wipe out life in Lingaland which has now served its purpose, like a ripe fruit for harvesting. Arrow tries to resist God's will and Shu orders the Granedger to blast Arrow free of Maestrog. They succeed and Arrow breaks free and leaves, however a new wall appears around the Granedger preventing it from moving further towards Epitaph Mountain and Arrow's escape. Bit then leads Shu and the others to the cargo hold and shows them the fully intact Rakuho which first carried Arrow into Lingaland.
| 19 | "Can You Sort This Out?"; Transliteration: "Omae ni Shimatsu ga Tsukerareru no ka" (Japanese: お前に始末がつけられるのか) | Tomohisa Onoue; Kim Hyoun il | Kazuki Nakashima | May 15, 2021 |
While Arrow heads towards the North Wall, the Edger group in Granedger are trapped within a temporary wall by God. Rudolf address Zetsu in the Rekka dreadnaught and explains that God has decided to destroy Lingalind because a human had progressed further than God desired. Zetsu vows to destroy Rudolf and what he calls his "fake God" and gives Prime Minister Kyo Meiketsu a Bind Warper to steer the dreadnaught which they name "Dairekka". Meanwhile, the wall surrounding Granedger dissolves freeing the dreadnaught. Arrow finds that he is unable to leave Lingalind and Rudolf forces him to return and crashes down near Dairekka. Granedger arrives and Shu convinces Zetsu to allow him to stop Arrow and his Briheight Muga. Princess Fine combines the power of Granedger and Lovsolute to get close to Muga and invoke her dark side, Lovsolute-Noir which absorbs Arrow's Conviction and returns him to his human form. However, when Shu shakes Arrow's hand to welcome him back, it appears that Arrows ability to destroy Convictions remains and he causes Shu to disappear.
| 20 | "Does People's Anger Reach God?"; Transliteration: "Hito no Ikari wa Kami ni Todoku ka" (Japanese: 人の怒りは神に届くか) | Michiru Itabisashi | Kazuki Nakashima | May 22, 2021 |
Unable to stop his own destructive actions, Arrow sets off to confront Rudolf while Dissonanza uses her Briheight Phantasmone to prevent anyone from following him. Kai again merges Gigan with Ren Sin's Reppu, creating the Briheight Gigan Reppu and they attack Phantasmone, cutting it to pieces. Bit convinces the others to return to Lutoh to protect the people from the upcoming battle between Rudolf and Rekka. Prax arrives first and confronts Rudolf, but he is too powerful for her. Arrow arrives and saves her then attack Rudolf but again he is too powerful. Zetsu dons multiple Bind Warpers and hands the rest to his troops, and then merges his Briheight with Arrow who turns into Muga Sword and he attacks Rudolf. Rudolf then manifests his own Briheight, Diostrage, and merges with his dreadnaught Diobenedica, repelling Zetsu and causing mass destruction in the Lutoh capital. When all seems lost, Bit dons a Bind Warper which creates his Briheight, Kaiten, which is in the shape of a giant Bind Warper. He then combines with Granedger turning the dreadnaught into a gigantic Briheight.
| 21 | "Who Will Stop Me?" (Note: Title written as 誰が私をとめられるのか in the episode.); Transliteration: "Dare ga Watashi o Tomerareru no ka" (Japanese: 誰が私を止められるのか) | Kayonaka Yamada | Kazuki Nakashima | May 29, 2021 |
Bit's conversion of Granedger into a Briheight inspires the Lingalind forces to unite in an attack on Rudolf's Diobenedica. They realize that Rudolf is manipulating Diobenedica remotely by cables, but are unable to break through his defenses. Bit then combines Granedger with Dairekka to form an even more powerful giant Briheight they name Granrekka. The combined Lingalind forces defeat Diobenedica, and Zetsu's Ogen combines with Muga Sword to impale Diostrage. Rudolf uses the physical contact with Muga Sword to transform it into a weapon to impale Zetsu, however Zetsu uses his remaining energy to reach into Rudolf's body and remove his chain of Bind Warpers. As he dies, Zetsu entreats the citizens of Lingalind to fight on as he and Rudolf are enveloped in a huge explosion. In the aftermath, Rudolf, Dissonanza or Arrow seem to have disappeared, but the Pretty Boys report that Arrow's Muga is staggering across the countryside, destroying everything in its path. Kai and Ren go to confront Muga, and Kai uses Zetsu's technique to create dark balls of conviction particles which destroy the parts of Muga that they touch. However, Kai is suddenly interrupted by the appearance of a gigantic Shu who reminds Kai that he promised to save Arrow.
| 22 | "But What Do I Live For?"; Transliteration: "Sore de mo Ore wa Naze Ikiru no ka" (Japanese: それでも俺はなぜ生きるのか) | Kōsaku Taniguchi | Kazuki Nakashima | June 5, 2021 |
Shu fits a giant Bind Warper to Arrow's Muga form while claiming that he rewrote Arrow's data, enabling Arrow to return to his human form. He then reveals that his human body is asleep in the Granedger and that his Briheight looks exactly like his human form. When Shu awakes, he explains that it was his Briheight form which disappeared when Arrow touched him. He says that he deduced that Arrow's power turns living beings into conviction particles which are absorbed by God to nourish the deity and it was part of Shu's risky plan to return Arrow to his human form. Meanwhile the Rekka forces capture arrow for killing Zetzu, but Shu offers information about God in exchange for his release. Shu starts by explaining that there are many "worlds" like Lingalind, like a snowflake with God's realm at the center and a "Lind" nodule surrounded by a wall at the end of each extension. Shu estimates that they can only reach God through Epitaph Mountain to negotiate with the deity. However, Kai challenges Arrow to a duel, and uses Zetsu's weapon, but Arrow refuses to fight and dodges Kai's blows. Arrow eventually realizes that it was the will to survive in the people he met in Lingalind which changed him from being a destroyer into a savior.
| 23 | "Does Destruction Rain From the Heavens?"; Transliteration: "Ten Kara Furu no wa Hametsu no Shirushi ka" (Japanese: 天から降るのは破滅の印か) | Tomohisa Onoue | Kazuki Nakashima | June 12, 2021 |
Arrow and the Edger leaders head off to confront God over the planned destruction of Lingalind while Shu and Kai reconcile and join forces. They leave in Granrekka for Epitaph Mountain and the wall vanishes as they approach but they are confronted by Rudolf. He releases the Rondo of Ruin, a gigantic Rakuho device that begins to destroy Lingalind while he creates a gigantic multi-pronged spear which immobilizes Granrekka and neutralizes their Briheights. Arrow summons his energy and conviction to save the population and his Saberblow converts the spear's prongs back into pillars. Granrekka then fires an Astonishment Maser blast at Rudolf and attempts to stop the rotating Rondo of Ruin, but without success. Rudolf unleashes his Arbitrator powers, but Fine absorbs Granrekka's damage with Lovesolute while Kai combines Arrow's Muga Sword, Ren's conviction and Zetsu's Martial Arrow to destroy the Rondo of Ruin. Rudolf manifests it again, but Shu encourages them the blast through it to the other side. They break in to God's realm and confront a man with a similar appearance to Arrow and his Briheight looks like a dark version of Arrow's Muga.
| 24 | "Do We Head for the Stars?"; Transliteration: "Waga Omomuku wa Hoshi no Gun ka" (Japanese: 我が赴くは星の群か) | Michiru Itabisashi; Jun'ichi Fujise | Kazuki Nakashima | June 19, 2021 |
The united Lingalind forces battle Rudiof's Diobenedica and Dissonanza's Phantasmone whose connection to God's power is suddenly broken. Relying on their own powers, Rudolf and Dissonanza continue to fight on. Meanwhile, Atlee challenges the man to explain why Lingalind and its population should be destroyed. He describes how a fleet of space ships carrying God's ancestors was struck by an epidemic and only a young newborn boy would survive. The ancestors created the "Lind" system to protect and nurture the child via a supply of conviction and left him as his guardian. However the survival instinct of the Lingaland people exceeded the system limits and like a malignant growth, it was destined for destruction in case it spread to other Linds. The guardian commences the destruction of Arrow and the others, while Rudolf's attack causes the Dark Fine to appear. Under Bit's urging, the Lingalind forces, including those who died and were converted to data, launch an all-out attack, destroying Rudolf and Dissonanza. Arrow offers to personally return the child to its home and his plea is heard. The Lingalind leaders reach the gigantic child which has been in stasis for 2,000 years. One month later, Shu has revised the conviction cycle, and developed an interstellar warp system. Shu, Bit, Elsha, Atlee and Arrow head off in their space ship to find God's home world, the third planet of the Solar System, called Earth.
