= Tokyo 24th Ward =

Japanese anime television series

- Key visual

東京24区 (Tōkyō Nijūyon-ku)
- Genre: Thriller; Science fiction
- Created by: Team 24
- Anime television series
- Directed by: Naokatsu Tsuda
- Written by: Vio Shimokura
- Music by: Hideyuki Fukasawa
- Studio: CloverWorks
- Licensed by: Aniplex of America: SEA: Plus Media Networks Asia; HK/TW: Muse Communication
- Original network: Tokyo MX, GYT, GTV, BS11, ABC, Mētele
- Original run: January 6, 2022 – April 7, 2022
- Episodes: 12
- icon

Tokyo 24th Ward (Japanese: 東京24区, Hepburn: Tōkyō Nijūyon-ku; also stylized as TOKYO TWENTY FOURTH WARD) is a Japanese original anime television series produced by CloverWorks. The series aired from January to April, 2022.

== Plot ==
On an artificial island in Tokyo Bay there is a special district commonly known as the 24th Ward, childhood friends Ran, Koki and Shuta hung out together. Their lives changed when their school caught on fire and Koki's sister Asumi was caught inside. They argued about the best way to save her, and instead of working together, Shuta rushed in but was unable to save Asumi's life. Now, a year after the incident, they receive visual messages from Asumi presenting them with life-and-death situations in which they have to decide on their course of action. A strange character called Carneades appears and threatens to thrust choices upon the world.

== Characters ==
Shuta (Shu) Aoi (蒼生シュウタ, Aoi Shūta)
Voiced by: Junya Enoki (Japanese); Billy Kametz (episodes 1-6), Alejandro Saab (episode 7-12) (English)
The blue-haired son of the owner of the "Aoi Bakery" in the 24th ward. He is physically fit with almost superhuman physical abilities. He is known as hero "Mr.24" because he protects the ward. He is a childhood friend of Koki and Ran.
Ran Akagi (朱城ラン, Akagi Ran)
Voiced by: Yuma Uchida (Japanese); Zeno Robinson (English)
The red-haired leader of the artist group "DoRed" who is active in the 24th Ward. He has a strong personality and conveys his message through graffiti art. He is a childhood friend of Shuta and Koki and the trio are referred to as "RGB" because of their individual hair colors, Red, Green and Blue.
Kouki (Ko) Suidō (翠堂コウキ, Suidō Kōki)
Voiced by: Kaito Ishikawa (Japanese); Landon McDonald (English)
The green-haired son of the famous "Suidou Zaibatsu" in the 24th ward. He is extremely bright and generally has a calm demeanor. He is a childhood friend of Shuta and Ran.
Asumi Suidō (翠堂アスミ, Suidō Asumi)
Voiced by: Manaka Iwami (Japanese); Xanthe Huynh (English)
Sister of Koki and childhood friend of her brother, Ran and Shuta whom she called "RGB" because of their hair colors. A year ago, she died getting trapped in a fire at school.
Mari Sakuragi (櫻木まり, Sakuragi Mari)
Voiced by: Yui Makino (Japanese); Jackie Lastra (English)
A childhood friend of Ran, Kouki and Shuta, who works on the popular okonomiyaki restaurant "Itadaki" in the 24th Ward and has a puppy called Daisy.
Kinako (きなこ)
Voiced by: Nanami Tomaru (Japanese); Lisa Reimold (English)
A friend of Ran and member of the "DoRed" group.
Sakiko (Satchan) Tsuzuragawa (黒葛川早紀子, Tsuzuragawa Sakiko)
Voiced by: Hitomi Nabatame (Japanese); Amber Lee Connors (English)
She is the chief researcher of the Central Information Center and manages the Hazard Cast used by SARG which automatically calculates and predicts crime scenes. She also keeps a watchful eye over Koki.
Gori Suidō (翠堂豪理, Suidō Gori)
Voiced by: Taiten Kusunoki (Japanese); Jason Marnocha (English)
Koki and Asumi's father and the powerful mayor of the 24th Ward.
Kanae Suidō (翠堂香苗, Suidō Kanae)
Voiced by: Sayaka Ohara (Japanese); Dawn M. Bennett (English)
Koki and Asumi's mother, and former wife of Gori Suidō and died some years ago. She was a kind-hearted woman who worked as an elementary school teacher and had a strong interest in justice.
Kudo (Kunai) Naito (クナイ)
Voiced by: Soma Saito (Japanese); Khoi Dao (English)
A member of the "DoRed" group and childhood friend of Ran. He wanted to be a graffiti artist but was much better with technology and developed his hacking skills.
Kuchikiri (0th)
A former associate of Kanae Isshiki and later mentor to Ran. He was injured in a car accident and became dyslexic, turning to graffiti art to express himself. He rejected technology and started a campaign against the KANAE System.
Yamamori (ヤマモリ)
Voiced by: Atsushi Imaruoka (Japanese); Bob Carter (English)
Lucky (ラッキー, Rakkī)
Voiced by: Eri Kitamura (Japanese); Shara Kirby (English)
Hiroki (Kaba) Shirakaba (白樺広樹, Shirakaba Hiroki)
Voiced by: Yōji Ueda (Japanese); SungWon Cho (English)
Former teacher at Takara Elementary school who keeps in contact with and takes an interest in the lives of his former students.
Kozue Shirakaba (白樺梢, Shirakaba Kozue)
Voiced by: Rina Hidaka (Japanese); Brittany Lauda (English)
Daughter of Hiroki Shirakaba and refused to attend school following the fire in which Asumi was killed.
Wataru Tsukushi (筑紫渉, Tsukushi Wataru)
Voiced by: Yuichi Nakamura (Japanese); Keith Silverstein (English)
Kana Shishido (宍戸花奈, Shishido Kana)
Voiced by: Yumiri Hanamori (Japanese); Morgan Berry (English)
Kaoru Shindō (進藤薫, Shindō Kaoru)
Voiced by: Hiroya Egashira (Japanese); Austin Lee Matthews (English)
Hajime Taki (ターキー, Tākī)
Voiced by: Ryōtarō Okiayu
A shady character who works for the large Yabusame corporation which is seeking to buy up land in the 24th Ward prior to its amalgamation with greater Tokyo. His main gang members are called Gutter and Chop.
Howard Win (ハワード・ウィン, Hawādo Win)
Voiced by: Takeshi Hirabayashi
A wealthy industrialist and developer who plans to demolish shantytown and the 24th ward, then make a fortune from redeveloping it.

== Production and release ==
On October 24, 2021, CloverWorks announced that it is producing an original anime television series titled Tokyo 24th Ward. The series is directed by Naokatsu Tsuda, with Vio Shimokura writing and overseeing series' scripts, Shuji Sogabe and Kanako Nono designing the characters, Takahiro Kishida adapting those designs for animation, and Hideyuki Fukasawa composing the series' music. It aired from January 6 to April 7, 2022, on Tokyo MX and other networks, with the first episode being a one-hour special. (Note: Tokyo MX lists the series premiere at 24:30 JST on January 5, 2022, which is effectively January 6 at 12:30 a.m..) The opening theme song is "Paper Sky" by Survive Said the Prophet, while the ending theme song is "255,255,255" by Junya Enoki, Yuma Uchida, and Kaito Ishikawa. Plus Media Networks Asia licensed the series in Southeast Asia and will release it on Aniplus Asia.

=== Episodes ===
No.	Title	Directed by	Written by	Storyboarded by	Original release date
1	"RGB"	Naokatsu Tsuda, Hidetoshi Takahashi, Ōri Yasukawa	Vio Shimokura	Naokatsu Tsuda	January 6, 2022 (Note: This double-length episode aired as a one hour special at 12:00 a.m. JST, 30 minutes before the original air time.)
Childhood friends Ran, Ko, and Shu were born and raised in the 24-ku (24th Ward). They hung out together and were referred to a "RGB" because of their different hair color. One day, their school was engulfed in flames, and Shu tried to save Koki's sister Asumi from the inferno, but she was fatally injured when she shielded her friend Kozue with her body and died in his arms. A year later, the three friends to meet again at the memorial ceremony of the incident and afterwards their phones ring simultaneously. The phone call is from their supposedly dead friend, Asumi, which presents them with a vision of the soon to be launched Kizuna Train full of passengers heading towards their friend Mari holding her puppy on the tracks, presenting them with the Trolley problem. The vision becomes true after Mari who chases her puppy Daisy onto the railway tracks and becomes caught as the train hurtles towards her. The RGB friends use their combined and strangely enhanced knowledge and skills to resolve the dilemma by saving both Mari and the passengers. Later, Shu is convinced that Asumi still exists.
2	"Sepia Graffiti"; Transliteration: "Sepia Gurafiti" (Japanese: セピア・グラフィティ)	Kakushi Ifuku	Vio Shimokura	Naokatsu Tsuda	January 13, 2022
Preparations are being made for the 24th Ward Gourmet Festival and Mari overhears Shirakaba and Chikushi from SARG talking about its funding by Takara Mall which is operated by Yabusame through a paper company. In a series of flashbacks, the proposed demolition of the historic Takara Elementary school was strongly opposed by Asumi who encouraged her friends and the RGB to cover the buildings with murals and draw attention to its plight. However, while the issue was being discussed, the school caught on fire, which led to Asumi's death. Back in the present, Mari draws strength from Asumi's conviction for what she believed in, and decides to enter her okonomiyaki in the Gourmet Festival.
3	"Here Today, Gone Tomorrow"; Transliteration: "Asa ni wa Kōgan Arite" (Japanese: 朝には紅顔ありて)	Ryō Kodama	Vio Shimokura	Takahiro Miura	January 20, 2022
Hajime Taki and his gang plan to sabotage the judging at the Gourmet Festival so that Yabusame's Mon Jungle food stall wins, but they are foiled by Kaba who exposes them and they are disqualified. Just then the RGB team receive another phone message from Asumi, with a vision showing a tornado threatening the lives of everyone at the festival. The boys are given a choice: get people run across the bridge to the mainland, but leaving the weak behind or guide the weak into a shipping containers for protection, but this will leave many others outside - either way, people will die. RGB immediately initiate a plan to clear the bridge of vehicles and begin evacuation, while Ran arranges for trucks carrying containers to head towards the island. However, due to a misunderstanding Shu causes a truck to block the bridge, so the boys arrange for everyone to shelter inside the containers on trucks jammed on the bridge. However, Kaba's daughter Kozue is still on the island looking for her father. Kabe tries to save her, and Shu goes to their aid, but is unable to save Kaba who is blown away. Later it is reported that 21 people died and 130 were seriously injured and the RGB decide that they must work together more effectively if another disaster occurs. Suddenly, TV transmission is interrupted with the image of and upside-down phoenix and a character appear on the screen calling himself Carneades and threatening to thrust choices upon the world in the future.
4	"Silver City"; Transliteration: "Nibiiro no Machi" (Japanese: 鈍色の街)	Shin'ichirō Ushijima	Vio Shimokura	Shin'ichirō Ushijima	January 27, 2022
Three months after the tornado there has been no communication from Asumi or Carneades. Ko is assigned to investigate the threat of highly addictive drug "D" which is being used by the youth. Meanwhile, Mr Howard Win, the "Casino King", is seeking to open a casino in the 24th Ward. Shu sees Kozue leaving her house late at night and follows her into shantytown. She has gone to photograph a graffiti mural featuring the character "SuperKaba" which is modelled on her father and she is approached by Kunai who explains the mural was painted by "Red" of the DoRed group. Shu consoles her, and she sees him as a hero even though he could not save her father. Suddenly the Carneades firebird symbol appears projected into the night sky and the symbol appears on TV screens warning the population to "choose their future". The RGB group then receive another call from Asumi sending a vision of a cruise ship of VIPs in Tokyo Harbor which has a remote controlled bomb on board planted by a terrorist. They are challenged to snipe to bomber before they can detonate the bomb which does not seem a real choice, until Ran realizes the terrorist is probably Kunai.
5	"Red Line"; Transliteration: "Reddo Rain" (Japanese: レッドライン)	Hidetoshi Takahashi	Vio Shimokura	Takahiro Miura	February 3, 2022
The RGB calculate the time that the will explode bomb on the cruise ship which is owned by Mr Howard Win. Ko notifies the ship, but the captain refuses to evacuate so Shu sneaks on board to investigate. Meanwhile, Ran has a series of flashbacks to his youth where he and Kunai were influenced and encouraged by the famous graffitist, Oth, however, Kunai was more skilled at hacking than art. Ran visits Kunai's home where he discovers that Kunnai's invention of Di-VA, a music application which uses the owner's biorhythms to create soothing music, had been sold to Hajime Taki of the Kaburaya Corporation to aid his ailing mother. Kaburaya Corporation then modified the app to create addictive sounds which could destroy the user's reasoning, a drug without a physical existence. This led to the increased the crime rate, playing into Howard Win's plan to demolish shantytown and redevelop it. Devastated by the misuse of his creation, Kunai built a bomb in a hard drive which he gave to Taki stating it was an enhanced software version, knowing that Taki would take it to Howard aboard the ship. Ran tracks down Kunai just as he is about to detonate the bomb, but he is followed by Ko and SARG whose sniper shoots Kunai dead.
6	"Under the Green Flower"; Transliteration: "Suika no Moto ni" (Japanese: 翠花の下に)	Ken Sanuma	Vio Shimokura	Chacha Yamamoto	February 10, 2022
SARG prepare to arrest Ran for questioning about Kunai's activities, but DoRed members help him escape. The next day, TV channels broadcast a message previously recorded by Kunai in which he admits creating the app for the popular biometric-enabled cPhones that became the basis of drug "D". He claims that it was modified and distributed by Howard in his attempt to acquire Shantytown which is why Kunai targeted Howard's ship. Kunai's action causes a rift between Ran and Ko which Shu appears unable to mend. Ko's father, Mayor Gori, shows Ko the futuristic accumulation radio tower, Cornucopia, which is nearing completion and will be the center of the Hazard Cast system monitored by Sakiko Tsuzuragawa. The supercomputer has been named the KANAE System after Ko's mother whose ideas on protecting society inspired it. Days later, Mayor Gori announces the trial of the new system prior to a referendum on its implementation. Because it uses personal data from the participant's cPhone, there is a mixed reaction by the citizens about the trade-off between loss of privacy for enhanced security. While explaining the system to Ko, Gori reveals to his son's surprise that the heart of the system is Asumi's brain, still encased in her damaged body which was retrieved and kept in stasis after her death.
7	"Golden Sunrise"; Transliteration: "Kogane Sanraizu" (Japanese: 黄金サンライズ)	Kei Kamura	Vio Shimokura	Hidetoshi Takahashi, Ōri Yasukawa	February 24, 2022 (Note: This episode was scheduled to air on February 17, 2022 but was delayed.)
Two months after the introduction of the KANAE System, the integration between 24th Ward and Tokyo approaches and SARG's apprehension rates have increased. Ko is transferred to the Accident and Disaster Prevention Department and placed in charge of the Hazard Cast system, Shu is having problems making the bakery's signature Golden Sunrise bun, and Ran has gone underground to avoid the police. Anti-KANAE graffiti is increasing and DoRed graffiti murals such as SuperKaba is being covered over by Carneades graphics of a firebird in what has become a graffiti war. Shu is conflicted over his duty to be both a good baker and a hero, but eventually realizes that he can be both. His buns improve and in gratitude, the local children lead him to the location of the person creating the Carneades firebird graphics. He enters the building and finds 0th, the person who inspired Ran to become a graffitist.
8	"Black Mist"; Transliteration: "Kuroi Kiri" (Japanese: 黒い霧)	Tazumi Mukaiyama	Vio Shimokura	Takahiro Miura	March 3, 2022
0th reveals to Shu that he knows Carneades who resides at the top of the Cornucopia tower. Suddenly the RGB receive another call from Asumi showing the construction cranes atop Cornucopia being struck by lightning during a torrential storm and toppling to the ground creating many casualties. Asumi says that one person at the location could reconnect the crane's control cables and prevent the disaster, however they will be killed by a ligntning strike. If they are waned beforehand, they could survive, but the cranes will fall. 0th explains to Ran that he started the so-called graffiti war to stir people's anger against the KANAE system which he sees as a threat to humanity because it purports to control human behavior through its predictive AI is based on cypher and he asks Ran to hack into the KANAE system. As a storm approaches and the lightning alarm is sounded. Ran hacks into the Cornucopia surveillance system which shows Carneades at the top, but when Shu calls the rooftop phone, Carneades does not pick it up. Shu climbs to the top to find Carneades repairing the broken cable but is struck by lightning. Shu discovers that Carneades is actually really Tsuzuragawa. She had already revealed to Ko that the KANAE system had a bug, information which she kept from mayor Gori. Shu manages to revive Tsuzuragawa and take her to hospital. Meanwhile, during Ran's hack into the KANAE system to extract data for 0th and as sees a young woman who looks like Asumi.
9	"Silver Salt"; Transliteration: "Shirubā Soruto" (Japanese: シルバーソルト)	Yukiko Imai	Vio Shimokura	Yukiko Imai	March 10, 2022
Twenty years ago, the young Gori Suido reveals his future plans for the 24th Ward a "smart city" without crime, entrusting the AI design to Kanae Isshiki, backed up by Zaibatsu Suido, however her assistant Kuchikiri distrusted him. Later, as Kanae and were travelling in an experimental autonomous vehicle of her design, they had to quickly avoid another car, and the AI decided to save Isshiki and the young Sakiko Tsuzuragawa who was walking by, but caused Kuchikiri to be badly injured. Kuchikiri eventually regained consciousness but suffered from a form of dyslexia so gave he up technology and became a graffiti artist, calling himself 0th. As the years passed, Sakiko graduated and carried on Kanae's research. One day, during a Takara Food Bank day, Kanae was stabbed to death by a crazed man demanding money, and with her dying breath she asked Sakiko to watch over Ko and Asumi. Years later when Kuchikiri realized that Gori was building Cornucopia he fiercely objected saying that the KANAE system had a flaw. As Cornucopia and the KANAE system neared completion Gori and Sakiko still did not have the biological brain to run the system, so when Asumi was fatally wounded at the historic Takara Elementary school, he decided to use his own daughter to complete the KANAE system and keep both his wife and daughter's memory alive. Back in the present, it is revealed that Asumi calls on the RGB when she is presented with a disastrous situation that she cannot resolve herself.
9.5	"Reversal film"	Takashi Konishi	N/A	N/A	March 17, 2022
A recap of the first half of the series.
10	"Confession From a Mask"; Transliteration: "Kamen no Kokuhaku" (Japanese: 仮面の告白)	Ryō Kodama	Vio Shimokura	Tomohiko Itō	March 24, 2022
The integration between 24th Ward and Tokyo approaches and property values and rents in Shantytown has made life difficult for the residents. In an attempt to catch Ran, SARG leaks word that Kinako is a member of DoRed, but when she is attacked by vigilantes, Shu saves her. Hajime Taki brings Ran into his office and reveals he is profiting from the DoRed graffiti war and convinces Ran to hack into the KANAE polling system to help sway the people using cPhones to vote against the Hazard Cast system. Meanwhile, Gori decides on forced eviction of the Pylon Apartment building which stirs up anti SARG feelings and the residents begin to gather under the DoRed banner. Tsuzuragawa regains consciousness and explains to Shu how Asumi became the brain of the KANAE system which began to develop its own conscience. Asumi contacted the RGB for help when she was faced with an unsolvable problem but this caused bugs in the system. Tsuzuragawa confesses that she created Carneades to buy time to investigate and asks Shu to save Asumi.
11	"Additive Color Mixture"; Transliteration: "Aditibu Karā Mikusuchā" (Japanese: アディティブ・カラー・ミクスチャー)	Ōri Yasukawa	Vio Shimokura	Ōri Yasukawa	March 31, 2022
Tsuzuragawa presents Shuta with the dilemma of either eradicating Asumi from the KANAE system or sending her into permanent sleep. Chikushi arrests Shuta after he is identified by the Hazard Cast system as a terrorist, but many others are also identified, indicating a fault with the system and that Asumi is not coping with the data load. At SARG headquarters, Chikushi explains to Shuta that the Takara Elementary school fire was caused by rats eating through electrical wiring and not arson as Gori has asserted. He hands Shuta a HDD with data that Tsuzuragawa retrieved from Cornucopia. Meanwhile, Mari convinces Shuta to talk to Asumi to dertemine her wishes and he meets with Ko and Ran to discuss their options. However, they argue and start fighting about the right path to take but eventually decide they must collaborate and talk to Asumi. With the data on the HDD and Kunai's Di-VA data that Ran received from Oth, Ran believes that he can connect to her. Meanwhile, Asumi detects their intentions and does not want Shuta to contact her.
12	"Youth 24th Ward"; Transliteration: "Seishun Nijūyon-ku" (Japanese: 青春24区)	Hidetoshi Takahashi, Takahiro Miura	Vio Shimokura	Takahiro Miura	April 7, 2022
Asumi sends another message to the RGB boys, saying that if Shuta gives the data to Ran, the faults of the KANAE system will be exposed, her father arrested and the referendum will fail, however if he gives the data to Ko, the KANAE system will take effect and protect the 24th Ward but at the cost of losing personal privacy. Rather than make a choice, RGB decide to visit Asumi together and discuss it with her, although she does not want to see them or be forced to determine the future. Asumi does everything she can to stop them, including declaring them as terrorists, but with Tsuzuragawa's help they find a way into Cornucopia. They reach the core and see Asumi and establish contact with her conscience while their conversation is transmitted across the 24th Ward. RGB offer to share her burden of having to make important decisions and as Asumi accepts their offer, Shuta declares his love for her and she reciprocates. Then, across the island, everyone declares their love for Asumi and the sacrifices she made, but then she asks Shuta, Ko and Ran if she can leave, and she fades from existence along with the KANAE system. Later, the 24th Ward is incorporated into Tokyo and renamed the "Nijimi Ward" with everyone's futures now resting on their own shoulders, although with the benefit of Shuta, Ko and Ran's help.
