= Karakuri Circus =

Japanese manga series and its adaptations

- First tankōbon volume cover, featuring (from left to right) Masaru Saiga, Éléonore Saiga and Narumi Katō

からくりサーカス (Karakuri Sākasu)
- Genre: Action; Dark fantasy
- Manga
- Written by: Kazuhiro Fujita
- Published by: Shogakukan
- Imprint: Shōnen Sunday Comics
- Magazine: Weekly Shōnen Sunday
- Original run: July 9, 1997 – May 31, 2006
- Volumes: 43
- Anime television series
- Directed by: Satoshi Nishimura
- Produced by: Shōta Wada
- Written by: Toshiki Inoue; Kazuhiro Fujita
- Music by: Yuki Hayashi
- Studio: Studio VOLN
- Licensed by: Sentai Filmworks
- Original network: Tokyo MX, BS11
- Original run: October 11, 2018 – June 27, 2019
- Episodes: 36
- icon

Karakuri Circus (Japanese: からくりサーカス, Hepburn: Karakuri Sākasu; lit. 'Mechanical Puppet Circus') is a Japanese manga series written and illustrated by Kazuhiro Fujita. It was serialized in Shogakukan's shōnen manga magazine Weekly Shōnen Sunday from July 1997 to May 2006, with its chapters collected in 43 tankōbon volumes.

The series follows Masaru Saiga, a young boy who inherits a vast fortune and dreams of becoming a puppeteer; Narumi Katō, a martial arts expert afflicted with Zonapha syndrome—a mysterious condition that halts his breathing unless he elicits laughter from others; and Shirogane, a silver-haired woman serving as Masaru's caretaker, who manipulates the puppet Harlequin. Together, they engage in combat against hostile Automatons (auto-mannequins) while striving to uncover a cure for Zonapha syndrome and prevent global catastrophe.

Karakuri Circus was adapted into a 36-episode anime television series by Studio VOLN, broadcast from October 2018 to June 2019. A mobile game was launched in December 2018 and stage play ran in January 2019.

By March 2018, the Karakuri Circus manga series had over 15 million copies in circulation.

== Synopsis ==
=== Background ===
The series' events revolve around a 200-year cycle of reincarnation beginning with Bai Yin and Bai Jin, two brothers who traveled from China to Prague to study alchemy and puppetry. Both fell in love with a woman named Francine, but when Yin married her, a jealous Jin abducted her. After nine years, Yin found Francine imprisoned and dying in Quiberon, France. He created the Aqua Vitae, an elixir of life, to save her, but she perished in a fire before he could administer it.

23 years later, Jin built an Automaton resembling Francine, infusing it with Aqua Vitae, but it remained lifeless. Desperate to make it laugh, he unleashed the Zonapha Syndrome (Z.O.N.A.P.H.A.) on Kuroga Village, cursing its people with agonizing paralysis unless they provoked laughter. Yin later sacrificed himself to cure them, passing his memories and puppet, Harlequin, to villager Lucille Berneuil.

Centuries later, swordsman and physician Shōji Saiga studied under Bai Yin and met Angelina, a healer carrying the "Soft Stone", a source of Aqua Vitae. After drinking the elixir to stay with her eternally, they adopted a marionette named Dean Maistre (later Sadayoshi). They also encountered Jin's abandoned Francine Automaton, which Shōji weakened. When Angelina gave birth to Éléonore—who unknowingly housed the Soft Stone—Automata attacked, forcing Angelina to entrust the baby to Francine. The Automaton perished saving Éléonore, who was then raised by Lucille.

Years later, Shōji discovered Sadayoshi was Jin's reincarnation, plotting to transfer his consciousness into his son, Masaru, for immortality. Shōji destroyed the memory data and sent Éléonore to protect Masaru and reclaim the Soft Stone.

=== Plot ===
The plot follows Masaru Saiga, Narumi Katō, and the shirogane (an Automata destroyer) Éléonore Saiga—referred to simply as Shirogane—blending elements of circus performance, alchemy, and karakuri puppetry. Upon his father's death, Masaru inherits an immense fortune, making him the target of assassination and abduction plots by his uncle and half-siblings. During an attack by his uncle's henchmen, Masaru is rescued by Narumi, a martial arts expert and a sufferer of the Zonapha syndrome, alongside Éléonore. As the story unfolds, a centuries-old tragedy is revealed, intertwining the origins of the Shirogane, malevolent Automatons, and the Zonapha syndrome. The Shirogane faction and the Nakamachi Circus group must collaborate to avert global catastrophe.

Later on, the narrative diverges into two parallel story arcs. The first follows Narumi as he allies with the Shirogane to combat the Automatons and halt the spread of Zonapha syndrome. The second arc centers on Éléonore and Masaru, who join the Nakamachi Circus in an attempt to lead ordinary lives, though their destinies remain inextricably tied to the overarching conflict. Events from each arc are referenced in the other, occasionally directly influencing their respective outcomes. The two storylines ultimately converge during the climax, resolving the central conflict.

== Media ==
=== Manga ===
Written and illustrated by Kazuhiro Fujita, Karakuri Circus was serialized in Shogakukan's shōnen manga magazine Weekly Shōnen Sunday from July 9, 1997, to May 31, 2006. (Note: It started in the magazine's 32nd issue of 1997 (cover date July 23), released on July 9 of that same year.) (Note: It finished in the magazine's 26th issue of 2006 (cover date June 14), released on May 31 of that same year.) It spanned 425 chapters, which were collected in 43 tankōbon volumes, released from December 10, 1997, to August 11, 2006. The manga has been reprinted and collected in multiple editions: "My first wide" edition (collected in 16 volumes, released from November 2008 to February 2010); wideban edition (collected in 23 volumes, released from July 2011 to April 2013); bunkoban edition (collected in 22 volumes, released from May 2017 to February 2019); and kanzenban edition (collected in 26 volumes, released from September 2018 to September 2019).

An official guidebook was published by Shogakukan under the Shōnen Sunday Comics Special imprint on July 16, 2004.

=== Anime ===
A 36-episode anime television series adaptation aired from October 11, 2018, to June 27, 2019, on Tokyo MX and BS11. The series was animated by Studio VOLN and directed by Satoshi Nishimura, with series composition by Toshiki Inoue and Kazuhiro Fujita, and character designs by Takahiro Yoshimatsu. Yuki Hayashi composed the series' music and Twin Engine produced the series. The episodes were collected in three Blu-ray sets released by VAP between June 19 and October 23, 2019. The first opening song is "Gekkō" (月虹; lit. 'Moonbow'), performed by Bump of Chicken, while the first ending song is "Marionette" (マリオネット, Marionetto), performed by Lozareena. The second opening song is "Haguruma" (ハグルマ; lit. 'Cogwheel'), performed by Kana-Boon, and the second ending song is "Yūdachi" (夕立ち; lit. 'Evening Shower'), performed by Memai Siren. The third opening song is "Over Me", performed by Lozareena, while "Gekkō" by Bump of Chicken is used again as the third ending song.

The series was simulcast exclusively on Amazon Video worldwide. In February 2021, Sentai Filmworks announced that it had licensed the series for home video and digital release. It was released on Blu-ray Disc on May 18, 2021.

=== Video games ===
A RPG smartphone game developed by Tenda, Kick Ass and Game Gate, titled Karakuri Circus: Larmes d'un Clown, was launched on December 18, 2018. The game was shut down on most platforms on October 24, 2022.

A pachinko game, P-Fever Karakuri Circus, was released by SANKYO in August 2022.

=== Stage play ===
A stage play adaptation ran in Tokyo at the Shinjuku Face theater from January 10–20, 2019. Yū Murai directed the play and Keita Kawajiri wrote the script. The cast included Taiga Fukazawa as Masaru Saiga, Koudai Takikawa as Narumi Kato, Momoka Onishi and Riho Iida as Shirogane/Francine (double cast), Kairi Miura as Bai In, Ryōtarō Kosaka as Bai Jin, Kento as Eiryo Ashihana, Shōjirō Yokoi as George LaRoche, Yūki Ochi as Guy Christophe Rech, Ryōko Tanaka as Lucille Berneuil, Natsuki Maeda as Harlequin, Saki Endō as Fatima, Yōjirō Murata as Faceless, Mitsuru Karahashi as Pantalone, Hiroya Matsumoto as Arlecchino, Seshiru Daigo as Columbine and Shūhei Izumi as Dottore.

== Reception ==
By March 2018, the manga had over 15 million copies in circulation. Karakuri Circus was nominated for the 23rd Kodansha Manga Award in the shōnen category in 1999. It was one of the Jury Recommended Works at the 5th Japan Media Arts Festival in 2001. It was nominated for the 38th Seiun Award in the Best Comic category in 2007. On a 2020 poll conducted by the Goo website about the best Weekly Shōnen Sunday titles, Karakuri Circus ranked ninth. On TV Asahi's Manga Sōsenkyo 2021 poll, in which 150,000 people voted for their top 100 manga series, Karakuri Circus ranked 86th.
