= Yoru Sumino =

Japanese novelist

- 住野よる
- Born: Japan
- Occupation: Novelist
- Writing career
- Period: 2015–present
- Genres: Light novel, coming-of-age story
- Notable work: I Want to Eat Your Pancreas
- Notable awards: The Touch "2015 Book of the Year" Award (2nd place); "2016 Japan Booksellers' Award" (2nd place); "2018 Honto Hatachi ga Ichiban Yonda Shōsetsu Ranking" (1st place)

Yoru Sumino (Japanese: 住野よる, Hepburn: Sumino Yoru) is a Japanese novelist currently living in Osaka Prefecture.

== Biography ==
Sumino started writing in high school. They initially submitted a story for the Dengeki Novel Prize, however after not making it past the first round of selection, Sumino revised their writing style before writing I Want to Eat Your Pancreas; the manuscript ended up being too long to be submitted for the prize.

They submitted the novel to the user-generated fiction website Shōsetsuka ni Narō in February 2014 under the pen name Yasumi Yano (夜野やすみ, Yano Yasumi). They later officially debuted with the same work under Futabasha in 2015.

== Works ==
- I Want to Eat Your Pancreas (君の膵臓をたべたい) (Illustrated by loundraw, published by Futabasha, June 2015, ISBN 978-4-575-23905-8)
- I Had That Same Dream Again (また、同じ夢を見ていた) (Illustrated by loundraw, published by Futabasha, February 2016, ISBN 978-4-575-23945-4)
- At Night, I Become a Monster (よるのばけもの) (Published by Futabasha, December 2016, ISBN 978-4-575-24007-8)
- I Have a Secret (か「」く「」し「」ご「」と「) (Published by Shinchosha, March 2017, ISBN 978-4-10-350831-1)
- I Am Blue, in Pain, and Fragile (青くて痛くて脆い) (Published by Kadokawa, March 2018, ISBN 978-4-04-105206-8)
- Mugimotosan Sanpo no Sukina Mono (麦本三歩の好きなもの) (Published by Gentosha, March 2019, ISBN 978-4-344-03435-8)
  - Mugimotosan Sanpo no Sukina Mono Dainishū (麦本三歩の好きなもの 第二集) (Published by Gentosha, February 2021, ISBN 978-4-344-03756-4)
- I Will Forget This Feeling Someday (この気持ちもいつか忘れる) (Published by Shinchosha, September 2020, ISBN 978-4-10-350832-8)
- Ripping Someone Open Only Makes Them Bleed (腹を割ったら血が出るだけさ) (Published by Futabasha, July 2022, ISBN 9784575245431)
- Koi to Sore to Ato Zenbu (恋とそれとあと全部) (Published by Bungeishunjū, February 2023, ISBN 978-4-16-391660-6)
