= Seeing Blue =

Japanese manga series

- First tankōbon volume cover

青に、ふれる (Aoi ni, Fureru)
- Genre: Coming of age
- Manga
- Written by: Nozomi Suzuki
- Published by: Futabasha
- English publisher: NA: MangaPlaza
- Imprint: Action Comics
- Magazine: Monthly Action
- Original run: December 25, 2018 – December 25, 2023
- Volumes: 7

Seeing Blue (青に、ふれる, Aoi ni, Fureru) is a Japanese manga series written and illustrated by Nozomi Suzuki. It was serialized in Futabasha's Monthly Action magazine from December 2018 to December 2023.

== Synopsis ==
The series is centered around two people coming closer due to their disabilities. Ruriko Aoyama has a large blue birthmark over her face, but doesn't let it bother her in high school. One day, she meets her new homeroom teacher Nozomi Kanda, and takes a peek at his notebook, discovering that the book contains features about her classmates, but nothing about her. She later discovers that Kanda cannot see people's faces clearly, but can identify hers due to the blue birthmark.

== Publication ==
Written and illustrated by Nozomi Suzuki, Seeing Blue was serialized in Futabasha's Monthly Action magazine from December 25, 2018, to December 25, 2023. Its chapters were collected into seven tankōbon volumes from July 12, 2019, to February 8, 2024.

The series is published in English on NTT Solmare's MangaPlaza website and app.

=== Volumes ===
No.	Release date	ISBN
1	July 12, 2019	978-4-575-85328-5
2	February 12, 2020	978-4-575-85408-4
3	December 10, 2020	978-4-575-85524-1
4	October 12, 2021	978-4-575-85647-7
5	September 12, 2022	978-4-575-85756-6
6	June 12, 2023	978-4-575-85850-1
7	February 8, 2024	978-4-575-85936-2

== Reception ==
The series was one of 50 nominees for the sixth Next Manga Awards in the print category in 2020.
