= Holmes of Kyoto =

Japanese mystery novel series

- First novel volume cover

京都寺町三条のホームズ (Kyōto Teramachi Sanjō no Hōmuzu)
- Genre: Mystery, romance
- Novel series
- Written by: Mai Mochizuki
- Illustrated by: Shizu Yamauchi
- Published by: Futabasha
- English publisher: NA: J-Novel Club
- Original run: April 2015 – present
- Volumes: 24 + 2 extra
- Manga
- Illustrated by: Ichiha Akizuki
- Published by: Futabasha
- Magazine: Monthly Action; Web Action
- Original run: December 2017 – August 2025
- Volumes: 15
- Anime television series
- Directed by: Tokihiro Sasaki
- Produced by: List: Yutaka Kashiwagi; Ayaka Sugiura; Sau Chiba (Note: Unconfirmed romanization of 千葉唆宇.); Tetsuya Aoyama; Naoto Nagata; Kōhei Yamada; Yūichi Nakano; Ryūichirō Kawasaki; Toshimitsu Saegusa; Hideaki Suzuki; Gō Morita; Taiga Itō; Naoki Ishihara; Kōji Akio; Kōji Hatazawa (#6–12); Kenji Tsujimura (#7–12)
- Written by: Kenichi Yamashita
- Music by: Akito Matsuda
- Studio: Seven
- Licensed by: Crunchyroll; NA: Discotek Media (home video)
- Original network: TV Tokyo, TVO, TVA, BS Japan, AT-X
- Original run: July 9, 2018 – September 24, 2018
- Episodes: 12

Holmes of Kyoto (Japanese: 京都寺町三条のホームズ, Hepburn: Kyōto Teramachi Sanjō no Hōmuzu) is a Japanese mystery novel series written by Mai Mochizuki and illustrated by Shizu Yamauchi. Futabasha have published twenty-four volumes since April 2015. A manga adaptation with art by Ichiha Akizuki has been serialized in Futabasha's seinen manga magazine Monthly Action from December 2017 to February 2024, later transferring to Web Action. It was collected into fifteen tankōbon volumes. An anime television series adaptation by Seven aired from July 9 to September 24, 2018, on TV Tokyo.

== Synopsis ==
In Kyoto's Teramachi Sanjou shopping district, there is an antique selling and government-licensed appraisal shop named "Kura". High school girl Aoi Mashiro unexpectedly runs into Kiyotaka Yagashira, the grandson of the shop's owner, and ends up working part-time at the shop. Kiyotaka is called the "Holmes of Teramachi Sanjou", and he and Aoi solve odd cases connected with artwork or antiques brought to them by various clients.

== Characters ==
Kiyotaka Yagashira (家頭 清貴, Yagashira Kiyotaka)
Voiced by: Kaito Ishikawa
Kiyotaka is a 22-year-old graduate student at Kyoto University and an apprentice at his family's antique shop "Kura". He is handsome and seems very gentle, but he is strict with himself and those around him. His nickname "Holmes", while a pun off his surname, also stems from his amazing deduction skills, as shown when he is able to discern a fake antique from a con artist. He was emotionally scarred when his first girlfriend left him for and became engaged to another man and has had no girlfriend since, but Aoi seems to have begun to fill that void in his life.
Aoi Mashiro (真城 葵, Mashiro Aoi)
Voiced by: Miyu Tomita
Aoi is in her second year of high school and has moved from Omiya in Saitama to Kyoto, which has caused a strained relationship with her friends back at home and a break-up with her then-boyfriend. She currently works part-time at Kura. Honest and straightforward, Aoi was hired by Kiyotaka, who is convinced she has good intuition with and instinct about antiques, can see their true value and can determine if the articles are genuine or not. With the help of Kiyotaka's tuition and his encouragement, her "eye" develops to such an extent that she is praised by others as well as Kiyotaka. She also begins to develop feelings for Kiyotaka, but because of the betrayal by her ex-boyfriend and former best friend she had created an emotional line that she refused to cross; however, as the series progresses she comes to terms with and accepts her feelings for Kiyotaka.
Akihito Kajiwara (梶原 秋人, Kajiwara Akihito)
Voiced by: Ryohei Kimura
A novice actor, but gaining popularity. He is very handsome, and because of the light color of his hair, has an aura like a half-Japanese person. His father, who recently passed away, was a famous author. Even though he grew up in Kyoto, thanks to the influence of his parents he speaks standard Japanese. No matter what, he is very agreeable, but he sees Kiyotaka as his rival for Aoi's affections.
Enshō (円生)
Voiced by: Koji Yusa
He is said to be a genius art counterfeiter, encouraged by his artist father from a very young age. After his father died, he lost his enthusiasm for counterfeiting and entered the priesthood, but began counterfeiting again when after learning that Kiyotaka was exposing counterfeit artwork. He has shaved his head and wears Japanese style clothes. He is extremely nimble-fingered, is good at sports and has a good eye for things. After he is first exposed by Kiyotaka, he takes the name "Moria" (as in "Professor Moriarty", Sherlock Holmes' nemesis).
Seiji Yagashira (家頭 誠司, Yagashira Seiji)
Voiced by: Rikiya Koyama
Kiyotaka's grandfather and the owner of Kura. He is a nationally-known and -recognized appraiser who has also traveled internationally. He had at one time appeared on television as a panel member on an antiques appraisal show, but his refusal to identify a counterfeit piece as genuine and the producers' pleas that he do so in order to save the particular episode caused him to leave the show. Currently in his late 70's, he is currently dating Yoshie, a divorced woman thirty years his junior.
Takeshi Yagashira (家頭 武史, Yagashira Takeshi)
Voiced by: Yōji Ueda
Kiyotaka's father and Seiji's son. He is a novelist and the manager of Kura, but mostly leaves the actual day-to-day management to Kiyotaka. In the light novels and manga, he explains to Aoi that he had originally wanted to become an appraiser like his father, but found that he lacked the necessary talent; however, he has achieved success as a novelist, and even Kiyotaka praises his father as a brilliant writer.
Kaori Miyashita (宮下 香織, Miyashita Kaori)
Voiced by: Suzuna Kinoshita
Aoi's classmate and the younger sister of Saori. Due to her family's financial issues, her sister being chosen as Saio-Dai caused a great strain on them due to the overwhelming costs of preparation needed to transform one into the Saio-Dai. To persuade her sister to turn down the role, she wrote her a threatening letter telling her to not be the Saio-Dai, but in the end she is convinced it would be the best for her sister to become the Saio-Dai after all. Over time, she becomes Aoi's close friend and confidente.
Saori Miyashita (宮下 佐織, Miyashita Saori)
Voiced by: Yui Horie
Saori is a university student who was chosen to be the Saio-Dai for the Aoi Festival. Because of her strained relationship with two of her former friends, their relationship took a darker turn when she was chosen as the Saio-Dai, thus she began writing threats to herself in the hopes her friends would worry for her.
Yoshie Takiyama (滝山 好江, Takiyama Yoshie)
Voiced by: Sayaka Ohara
Yoshie is the girlfriend of Kiyotaka's grandfather. Although in her 40's, she looks much younger. The moment Akihito sees her he falls for her, but refuses to believe she is old enough to have a son Rikyu's age; his reaction when the truth is forced upon him is priceless.
Rikyū Takiyama (滝山 利休, Takiyama Rikyū)
Voiced by: Sanae Kobayashi
Rikyu is Yoshie's son, a cheeky little boy who has been studying abroad in France. Because he looked feminine from a very young age on, he started to train his body and studied judo in France. He also used to work part-time at Kura, similarly to Aoi, and his respect for Kiyotaka, whom he sees as an older brother, is over the top. He judges Aoi strictly, but finally accepts her as his successor at Kura.

== Media ==
=== Novel ===
The novel is written by Mai Mochizuki and illustrated by Shizu Yamauchi. Futabasha have published twenty-four volumes, a prequel volume and a side volume since April 2015. During their Anime Expo Lite panel, J-Novel Club announced they have licensed the novel.

No.	Original release date	Original ISBN	English release date	English ISBN
1	April 16, 2015	978-4-575-51775-0	September 8, 2020	978-1-7183-7648-9
2	August 6, 2015	978-4-575-51811-5	November 17, 2020	978-1-7183-7650-2
3	December 10, 2015	978-4-575-51848-1	January 20, 2021	978-1-7183-7652-6
4	April 14, 2016	978-4-575-51882-5	March 31, 2021	978-1-7183-7654-0
5	August 4, 2016	978-4-575-51775-0	June 11, 2021	978-1-7183-7656-4
6	December 15, 2016	978-4-575-51957-0	October 7, 2021	978-1-7183-7658-8
6.5	April 13, 2017	978-4-575-51988-4	—	—
7	April 13, 2017	978-4-575-51987-7	December 30, 2021	978-1-7183-7660-1
8	September 14, 2017	978-4-575-52032-3	February 17, 2022	978-1-7183-7662-5
9	March 15, 2018	978-4-575-52091-0	April 21, 2022	978-1-7183-7664-9
10	July 12, 2018	978-4-575-52132-0	July 8, 2022	978-1-7183-7666-3
11	January 10, 2019	978-4-575-52181-8	October 6, 2022	978-1-7183-7668-7
12	July 11, 2019	978-4-575-52243-3	November 21, 2022	978-1-7183-7670-0
13	January 16, 2020	978-4-575-52308-9	February 2, 2023	978-1-7183-7672-4
14	February 12, 2020	978-4-575-52318-8	April 6, 2023	978-1-7183-7674-8
15	August 7, 2020	978-4-575-52385-0	July 19, 2023	978-1-7183-7676-2
16	March 11, 2021	978-4-575-52456-7	January 15, 2024	978-1-7183-7678-6
17	August 5, 2021	978-4-575-52491-8	March 6, 2024	978-1-7183-7680-9
0	March 10, 2022	978-4-575-52555-7	April 30, 2026	978-1-7183-7682-3
18	April 14, 2022	978-4-575-52565-6	May 23, 2024	978-1-7183-7684-7
19	February 15, 2023	978-4-575-52625-7	August 15, 2024	978-1-7183-7686-1
20	October 11, 2023	978-4-575-52699-8	November 11, 2025	978-1-7183-7688-5
21	June 12, 2024	978-4-575-52761-2	February 19, 2026	978-1-7183-7690-8
22	May 14, 2025	978-4-575-52848-0	—	—
23	June 10, 2026	978-4-575-52926-5	—	—
24	July 8, 2026	978-4-575-52935-7	—	—

=== Manga ===
Written and illustrated by Ichiha Akizuki, it has been serialized in Futabasha's seinen manga magazine Monthly Action from December 2017 to February 2024, later transferring to Web Action where it completed its run in August 2025. The chapters were collected into fifteen tankōbon volumes.

No.	Release date	ISBN
1	March 12, 2018	978-4-575-85119-9
2	July 12, 2018	978-4-575-85185-4
3	January 12, 2019	978-4-575-85257-8
4	July 12, 2019	978-4-575-85329-2
5	January 10, 2020	978-4-575-85403-9
6	August 8, 2020	978-4-575-85480-0
7	March 12, 2021	978-4-575-85558-6
8	August 11, 2021	978-4-575-85622-4
9	March 10, 2022	978-4-575-85701-6
10	November 10, 2022	978-4-575-85776-4
11	March 28, 2023	978-4-575-85827-3
12	October 12, 2023	978-4-575-85886-0
13	June 12, 2024	978-4-575-85966-9
14	January 9, 2025	978-4-575-86046-7
15	October 23, 2025	978-4-575-86150-1

=== Anime ===
An anime television series adaptation by Seven aired from July 9 to September 24, 2018, on TV Tokyo. The series is directed by Tokihiro Sasaki, with scripts handled by Kenichi Yamashita, and character designs by Yōsuke Itō. The opening theme is "Koi ni Saku Nazo, Harahara to." (恋に咲く謎、はらはらと) by AŌP, and the ending theme is "Sasameyuki" (細雪, Light Snowfall) by Wagakki Band. Crunchyroll streamed the series. Discotek Media licensed the series and released it on home video in July 2022.

==== Episodes ====
No.	Title (Note: All English titles are taken from Crunchyroll.)	Original release date
1	"Holmes and Zen Master Hakuin"; Transliteration: "Hōmuzu to Hakuin zenji" (Japanese: ホームズと白隠禅師)	July 9, 2018
Two weeks after she started working at Kura, an antiques shop, Mashiro Aoi is happily settled in her new job. The store is owned by Yagashira Seiji, who is often out traveling the world, and his son Takeshi is an author who manages it but is more of an author. Seiji's grandson Kiyotaka, often nicknamed "Holmes", a young antiques' appraiser, actually runs the store. After Seiji leaves to talk with his editor, a man comes in and attempts to pass off a counterfeit ancient Kizeto tea bowl, but Kiyotaka exposes the fake and he flees the shop. Afterwards, while Kiyotaka and Aoi take a break, Aoi remembers when she first came, having stolen two hanging scrolls formerly belonging to her late grandfather to have appraised for money. The scrolls were painted by Zen Master Hakuin; both are genuine and worth a lot of money, but the second (a rare picture of a baby) Kiyotaka deems priceless and is impressed that Aoi managed to pick the two most valuable pieces out of an attic full of various antiques and junk. Aoi admits she wants to buy a ticket to go back to Saitama; she had moved to Kyoto six months ago, leaving behind her boyfriend and best friend. Last month her boyfriend had broken up with her to start dating her best friend, and she wants to tell them off. Kiyotaka tells her the story about the scroll of the baby, and she realizes that selling off such a treasure just to scold her friends is wrong. He offers her a job at Kura so she can earn the money for the ticket. Back in the present, a man angrily smashes the counterfeit tea bowl he made for the conman, promising to remember Kiyotaka's name.
2	"In Days of Aoi"; Transliteration: "Aoi no koro ni" (Japanese: 葵の頃に)	July 16, 2018
Miyashita Saori is chosen to be the yearly Saio-dai, "Queen" of the local Aoi Festival, a high honor. Kura's Owner brings Mrs. Miyashita and her daughters Saori and Kaori (who is a schoolmate of Aoi's) to the shop. Saori has found threatening letters in her bag telling her to drop out, and Owner thinks Kiyotaka can help. It's assumed a pair of girls, former friends of hers, are behind it. Kiyotaka goes to a gallery showing off the flower arrangements of their class, seeing two pieces from Saori, but they are very different. He meets the girls in question, Yuko and Keiko, at the gallery. Kiyotaka leaves to answer his phone, but it turns out to be a ruse as he believes the girls will speak more freely to Aoi, which happens. They reveal they are jealous of Saori, but with her family business on the decline and the expense of being the Saoi-dai, they're sure it'll ruin them. After hearing this, Kiyotaka arranges to meet with the Miyashita women with the answer. He accounts one letter to Kaori - she is conscious about how much money the role will cost the struggling family business and became worried. Kaori admits she hoped the letter would give her parents a reason to stop but when she learned the publicity would make up for the cost, decided not to go through with it. However, Saori put the first letter and a second she made herself in her bag. He points out the different flower arrangements, having realized from the styles one was made by Kaori, which also let him determine the letters were made by two people. Saori hoped the letters would make Yuko and Keiko worry about her and maybe they could go back to being friends. Kaori tells Saori to stop worrying about them and be such an amazing Saoi-dai they'll brag they used to be friends. Saori goes ahead as the Saio-dai, and Aoi and Kaori become friends.
3	"The Case of the Mt. Kurama Estate Inheritance"; Transliteration: "Kurama sansō ihin jiken-bo" (Japanese: 鞍馬山荘遺品事件簿)	July 23, 2018
A hike of Kiyotaka and Aoi's to Mt. Kurama turns into a visit to the Kajiwara estate at the request of Kiyotaka's father. Mr. Kajiwara passed away a few months ago and they are requesting Kiyotaka's help. They enjoy the day and stop at a river restaurant, Aoi in a good mood. Kiyotaka admits he lost his girlfriend when he was her age as he wouldn't have sex with her until they were in college, and she left him for another man. After they eat, they are escorted to the estate by Kurashina, Kajiwara's secretary, where they meet his widow Ayako and three sons: Fuyuki, Akihito, and Haruhiko, the youngest. Akihito is a rising actor and initially dismissive of Kiyotaka's abilities. Kurashina explains he was given two wills, the first a division of assets, the second a request he open three months after his death. It had instructions to a safe and orders to split three hanging scrolls between the sons. The scrolls were fakes, but were also burned by one of the five, though they don't know who. Kiyotaka learns Akihito was given the lion's share of the inheritance and Ayako was given an aquamarine ring. By having each of the sons describe the scrolls, Kiyotaka identifies them and says each had a message the father left for them. Fuyuki's, "Kiyomori Calls Back The Sun", was an expression of Kiyomori's power, so Kiyotaka believes Kajiwara was telling Fuyuki to aim for great heights, certain he could succeed. Akihito's was "Dragon Flying Over Mt. Fuji," an expression of the artist's ambition and a message that if Akihito is serious about his art he should aim high and wanted him to succeed. He is about to get to Haruhiko's when Ayako abruptly confesses that she burned the scrolls because she got such a small share, but wouldn't have done so if she had known there were such messages. Done, Kiyotaka and Aoi are escorted out by Fuyuki and Akihito, who ask about their brother's painting. Kiyotaka reluctantly tells them it's based on the "Tadamori's Lantern" tale: Tadamori went to slay an oni but realized it was only a monk, and the emperor thanked him for clearing it up by giving him a present, which (according to rumor) was the emperor's beloved, and Tadamori's son was born shortly afterwards. Kurashina had once saved Kajiwara and developed feelings for Ayako, so the message was that Kajiwara knew of the affair and that Haruhiko was the resulting child, so Ayako burned the scrolls to hide this. The second will was dated for shortly after Haruhiko's 20th birthday, so Kiyotaka believes that Kajiwara had meant to tell him when he came of age, but doesn't believe Kajiwara resented them; aquamarine stands for freedom, so his message was that he wanted his wife to live a life freely after his death, with Kurashina if they wish. The brothers thank him and promise to tell their family about this. Later, Kiyotaka says he realized Haruhiko was Kurashina's natural son when he first saw him as they had the same-shaped ears, which meant they were related.
4	"After the Festival"; Transliteration: "Matsuri no ato ni" (Japanese: 祭りのあとに)	July 30, 2018
Waking up from a dream in which she remembers how her ex-boyfriend Katsumi broke up with her telephonically to be with her former best friend Sanae, Aoi receives a text message. At the shop, she sees that Akihito is visiting and is startled when Kiyotaka enters wearing a yukata; he explains that he has been ordered to wear one on the Owner's orders in honor of the Gion Festival. Aoi is given a yukata by Mieko, which makes her feel self-conscious, and Akihito has to be pulled off her by Kiyotaka when he gets too familiar. After Mieko and Akihito leave, Izumi (Kiyotaka's former girlfriend) enters, asking to have a dish appraised for her husband. Kiyotaka identifies it as a Royal Copenhagen plate, and Izumi confides that her husband had cheated on her multiple times and she has considered leaving him; however, Kiyotaka appears to be completely unmoved. Before she leaves, she gives him a leaf-patterned tea bowl that she made at a mountain in Shiga, saying that she will return for it in two days at the Yoi Yoi Yama portion of the Festival. Later, Kiyotaka reminisces with Aoi about how he and Izumi first met, and Aoi tells him that the text she received was that her friends from Saitama will be coming to Kyoto for the Festival and that Sanae and Katsumi may be part of the group. Two days later, Kiyotaka leaves to make a special delivery, leaving Aoi to watch over the shop. Aoi does some research to try and learn the meaning of the tea bowl, and believes that the message Izumi is trying to convey is that she still loves Kiyotaka. As Aoi prepares to leave to meet her friends, Izumi finally arrives. When Aoi does meet up with her friends, Katsumi and Sanae are with them; they ask her to forgive them with Aoi's friends joining in, and she realizes that her friends have set her up. Kiyotaka shows up as they try to get her to enjoy the Festival with them and cleverly extricates her. Katsumi reveals his jealousy and gets slapped for it by Sanae, who then storms off. As they stroll away, Kiyotaka reveals that he was worried about Aoi and Aoi reveals her disappointment about the group's behavior towards her. Aoi finally allows herself to cry as Kiyotaka consoles her. Later, back at the shop, Kiyotaka tells Aoi that he replied to Izumi's hidden message with a poem of rejection and a suggestion that she talk out her problems with her husband and parents...a suggestion that was not received well, which secretly pleases Aoi.
5	"The Lost Dragon"; Transliteration: "Ushinawareta ryū" (Japanese: 失われた龍)	August 6, 2018
At Nanzenji Temple, a message is found stating that a dragon has been stolen. At the shop, Kiyotaka, the Owner and Aoi discuss the amount of counterfeit art work that has recently infiltrated museums, with Kiyotaka theorizing that the counterfeits are meant to test appraisers like himself and the Owner. Akihito, who's in Kyoto to appear in a television program, drops in drops in needing information from Kiyotaka about Nanzenji Temple and begs him to come with him to the temple; Kiyotaka agrees, since he has to go there anyway. The next day, they tour the temple with Akihito trying to learn about Kiyotaka's personal life, especially about his relationship with Aoi. They are met by a priest named Ensho, who gives them an impromptu tour of the temple's art treasures. The Vice-Abbot Unsho explains about the found message, but that nothing appears to have been stolen. Examination of the message compared to examples of the handwriting of everyone at the temple appears to show that the handwriting is that of the Head Abbot, but Kiyotaka concludes that the dragon in question has been stolen and a counterfeit put in its place, identifying the fake as a Zuiryu scroll he had seen earlier. He exposes Ensho as the counterfeiter who had also tried to implicate the Head Abbot and created the counterfeit tea bowl Kiyotaka had spotted in Episode 1. Ensho reveals that he was behind the flood of counterfeits in the museums, all to test Kiyotaka's appraisal skills, and flees. The Vice-Abbot confesses that he was aware of Ensho's criminal activities, but that it was their duty to accept Ensho's desire to join the priesthood, and in a strange way Kiyotaka's acknowledgement of him has made Ensho happy. Back at the shop, Akihito tells Aoi everything that happened, and Kiyotaka, after giving a detailed analysis about Ensho, is determined to expose all of Ensho's counterfeits.
6	"The Connoisseur's Philosophy"; Transliteration: "Mekiki no Tetsugaku" (Japanese: 目利きの哲学)	August 13, 2018
7	"Straying and Enlightenment"; Transliteration: "Mayoi to Satori to" (Japanese: 迷いと悟りと)	August 20, 2018
8	"Christmas Eve Tears and a Broken Alibi"; Transliteration: "Seiya no Namida to Aribai kuzushi" (Japanese: 聖夜の涙とアリバイ崩し)	August 27, 2018
Kiyotaka, along with Rikyu, is reluctantly drafted into becoming one of the waiters at Ueda's new "hunk cafe" for a few days until Christmas (with both of them becoming extremely popular with the young ladies frequenting the cafe). During this period, Kiyotaka's old girlfriend Izumi appears, needing Kiyotaka's help; she had finally broken up with her cheating boyfriend and has become engaged to Tachibana, but on the night of their engagement party he mysteriously disappeared for an hour and the alibi he gave appears extremely suspicious. Kiyotaka asks Izumi to check on certain things for him, and on Christmas Eve he, Aoi, Izumi and Tachibana meet at the cafe after closing time.. Kiyotaka reveals that Tachibana has indeed been lying to Izumi, but not for the reason she had believed (that he was cheating on her with his former girlfriend); he had met with her but to finally break things off with her because he had actually fallen in love with Izumi. Kiyotaka and Aoi leave Izumi and Tachibana to mend their relationship, and they exchange Christmas gits: she gives him a bag full of cookies she had baked herself and he gives her a year-long pass to a special botanical gardens.
9	"The Sound of the Bell at Gion"; Transliteration: "Gion ni hibiku Kane no Oto wa" (Japanese: 祇園に響く鐘の音は)	September 3, 2018
10	"The Bisque Doll's Smile"; Transliteration: "Bisuku Dōru no Egao" (Japanese: ビスクドールの笑顔)	September 10, 2018
Aoi is constantly creeped out by one of the items on display in Kura, a Western female doll known as a "Bisque doll", even though she can't figure out why. Kiyotaka takes Aoi to another lesser-known cafe; upon leaving it, they run into Kiyotaka's grandmother, who then asks for his help concerning another Bisque doll which Kiyotaka's grandfather had given her upon their divorce fifty years ago, this one a male and the mate to the one at Kura; apparently her doll has been moving about the house from its place on a living room shelf of its own accord, frightening her granddaughter, and has even been found with tears on its face as though it had been crying. Kiyotaka quickly deduces that because his grandmother had recently placed the doll so prominently, her current husband had become insecure about their relationship, believing her to still be in love with Kiyotaka's grandfather. Realizing her mistake, she gives the doll to Kiyotaka, telling him to take it back to Kura; he does so, and the pair of dolls are reunited.
11	"Valentine's Party"; Transliteration: "Barentain no Yakai" (Japanese: バレンタインの夜会)	September 17, 2018
On Valentine's Day, Kiyotaka is asked to attend a reading by famous mystery writer Aigasa Kurisu who supposedly recently attempted suicide. When he and Aoi arrive, they are joined by the writer's two high school friends, her publisher, two photographers who work with her and a detective Kurisu had hired (but apparently stiffed on the payment). The reading is conducted by Kurisu's younger sister and states that her attempted suicide a month ago was in reality an attempted murder; it is accompanied by a request that Kiyotaka solve the mystery, and he agrees. He questions everyone present and is able to both reveal many of the company's hidden secrets and also come to a conclusion: that, with the exception of the sister and the detective, everyone present was somehow involved in the attempted murder. The suspects turn on one another, each claiming that the others were more responsible. Kurisu herself appears and announces that all of the confessions have been recorded, but that the culprits' fates will be decided later. Leaving, Aoi presents Kiyotaka with a Valentine's Day gift: chocolates made with the profile of Sherlock Holmes. He thanks her for her gift, saying that he couldn't have asked for a better birthday gift (his birthday happens to be February 14th); in return, he gives her her own pair of appraiser's gloves.
12	"Conditions of an Heir"; Transliteration: "kōkei-sha no jōken" (Japanese: 後継者の条件)	September 24, 2018
It's been almost a year since Aoi first came to work at Kura. Kiyotaka is asked by Rikyu's father to attend a meeting with his father, the head of the prestigious and wealthy Saito family. Arriving at the grandfather's mansion, they meet Saito's other two sons (all three were born of different mothers); also present is an assessor from Seiji's party and Fujiwara Keiko, the curator of a New York museum and an old acquaintance of Kiyotaka's. The patriarch appears and originally dismisses Aoi, but she is able to prove her appraiser's "eye" and skill and is allowed to remain. Saito explains that he has gathered his sons to choose his heir; the test is for them to decide which treasured item in the house is "the greatest to House Saito"; the assessors can provide information, but the sons must each make their own choice, with their decisions to be given at 7 pm. However, the assessor for one of the brothers arrives late...and is revealed to be Kiyotaka's nemesis Ensho. While the brothers and their assessors scour the house, in a conversation with Keiko Aoi mistakenly assumes her relationship with Kiyotaka to have been a romantic one, and she flees outside, where she is confronted by and almost attacked by Ensho; fortunately, Kiyotaka comes to her rescue. At 7 pm, all three brothers give their choices, but Saito declares them all to be incorrect; however, Kiyotaka is able to make the correct choice. Rikyu finally acknowledges Aoi to be a worthy successor to his position at Kura. Outside, Kiyotaka and Ensho confront each other; they both state their hatred for each other, and Ensho leaves. As Kiyotaka and Aoi leave, Aoi realizes and finally accepts that she has fallen in love with Kiyotaka; she decides that whatever happens she will no longer hide away her true feelings for him.

== Reception ==
=== Previews ===
Anime News Network (ANN) had five editors review the first episode of the anime: Paul Jensen felt the first antique appraisal wasn't engaging and lacked "emotional involvement" for the viewers but praised Aoi's appraisal for delivering "a much better story" with both personal and emotional stakes, saying the subject matter being used for character development was a "novel concept" and is worth seeing more of the show; James Beckett praised the "lush, colorful aesthetic", Aoi and Yagashira's characterizations and their "undeniable chemistry" elevating the "potentially dry material", concluding he expects the antique mysteries to stand alongside the slice-of-life elements with intriguing threads; Theron Martin praised Yagashira's character work and both the Aoi romantic angle and counterfeit story arc showing potential but was critical of the "measured pacing" and limited "visual variety" making the show fall "a bit on the dry side", concluding the show will find its audience and encourage more to watch it. Rebecca Silverman commented the show's set-up of appraising Japanese antiques will depend on the viewers' interest in subject matter, concluding "if you're a fan of slice of life, it may be worth checking out." The fifth reviewer, Nick Creamer, wrote that: "Holmes of Kyoto offers a surprisingly natural mix of mystery, pawn shop drama, character drama, and slice of life atmosphere. Making natural use of its Sherlock Holmes gimmick and offering a satisfying narrative even within this first episode, it's a low-key but confident and engaging production. Holmes gets a thumbs up from me."

=== Series ===
Silverman and fellow ANN editor Amy McNulty chose Holmes of Kyoto as their pick for the Worst Anime of Summer 2018, the former calling it disappointing with its "tedious mysteries" and "slow-burn romance" causing the show to feel unfocused and conflicted with the billing of its main genre, and the latter saying it suffers from "poor story choices and bad characterization" that makes it come across as "melodramatic" and "strain[s] credulity." Silverman chose the series as her pick for the Worst Anime of 2018, saying that despite the Aoi-Yagashira relationship being "fun to watch" she criticized the overall premise for lacking in quality mysteries and neglecting the counterfeiter subplot, concluding that "as far as an anime series goes, this alternately bored and frustrated me, which is not what I'm looking for in my entertainment." Tim Jones, writing for THEM Anime Reviews, wrote that: "Holmes of Kyoto isn't a bad show, but it's largely forgettable. It has decent leads, but the side characters are either underutilized or obnoxious. The art is solid, but the animation is bare-bones. It has a lot of stories, but few of them are particularly engaging."
