= Every Adventure Needs a Weapon! The Blacksmith Life of Rudy the Obsessed =

Japanese manga series

- First tankōbon volume cover

冒険には、武器が必要だ！～こだわりルディの鍛冶屋ぐらし～ (Bōken ni wa, Buki ga Hitsuyo da! Kodawari Rudi no Kajiya-gurashi)
- Genre: Fantasy comedy
- Manga
- Written by: Mado Guchimoto
- Published by: Futabasha
- English publisher: NA: Yen Press
- Imprint: Action Comics
- Magazine: Monthly Action; (December 25, 2023 – February 24, 2024); Web Comic Action; (April 26, 2024 – present)
- Original run: December 25, 2023 – present
- Volumes: 5

Every Adventure Needs a Weapon! The Blacksmith Life of Rudy the Obsessed (冒険には、武器が必要だ！～こだわりルディの鍛冶屋ぐらし～, Bōken ni wa, Buki ga Hitsuyo da! Kodawari Rudi no Kajiya-gurashi) is a Japanese manga series written and illustrated by Mado Guchimoto. It initially began serialization in Futabasha's seinen manga magazine Monthly Action in December 2023. After the magazine disbanded in February 2024, it was transferred to the Web Comic Action website in April that year.

== Synopsis ==
The series is centered around Rudy, a young female blacksmithing apprentice who is obsessed with crafting impractical weaponry to aid adventurers entering the dungeon near her house, much to the chagrin of her boss.

== Production ==
In an interview with Web The Television, Guchimoto mentioned that they had spoken with their editor about launching a new series with a female protagonist in a fantasy world, since they had admired female inventors and mechanics.

== Publication ==
Written and illustrated by Mado Guchimoto, Every Adventure Needs a Weapon! The Blacksmith Life of Rudy the Obsessed initially began serialization in Futabasha's seinen manga magazine Monthly Action on December 25, 2023. After the final issue of Monthly Action was published on February 24, 2024, the series was transferred to the Web Comic Action website on April 26, 2024. Its chapters have been compiled into five tankōbon volumes as of September 2026.

In November 2025, Yen Press announced that they had licensed the series for English publication beginning in May 2026.

No.	Original release date	Original ISBN	North American release date	North American ISBN
1	August 8, 2024	978-4-575-85992-8	May 26, 2026	979-8-8554-2483-6
1. "Rudy – Apprentice at Lock and Key in the Dungeon Town of Whale's Maw"; 2. "A Job for Nico of the Goat Vane Tavern"; 3. "A Job for the Boss Lady of the Goat Vane Tavern"; 4. "A Job for Kittle the Gardener"; 5. "A Job for Yish the Bounder"; 5.5: "Every Weaponsmith Needs a Catalog!"
2	March 13, 2025	978-4-575-86066-5	April 27, 2027	979-8-8554-2876-6
3	September 11, 2025	978-4-575-86130-3	—	—
4	March 12, 2026	978-4-575-86198-3	—	—
5	September 10, 2026	978-4-575-86267-6	—	—

== Reception ==
The series was ranked fourth in the Isekai Category at Niconico's 2nd Manga General Election.
