= Noriko Shibasaki =

Japanese voice actress and singer

- 芝崎 典子
- Born: 14 September 1991 (age 34)
- Occupation: Voice actress
- Years active: 2013–present
- Employer: Mausu Promotion
- Notable work: Tsugumomo as Chisato Chikaishi; The Idolmaster Shiny Colors as Chiyuki Kuwayama; The Witch and the Beast as Mary

Noriko Shibasaki (Japanese: 芝崎 典子, Hepburn: Shibasaki Noriko; born 14 September 1991) is a Japanese voice actress from Tokyo, affiliated with Mausu Promotion. She is known for voicing Chisato Chikaishi in Tsugumomo, Chiyuki Kuwayama in The Idolmaster Shiny Colors, and Mary in The Witch and the Beast.

== Biography ==
Noriko Shibasaki, a native of Tokyo, was born on 14 September 1991. As an elementary school student, she got tired of eating lunch in the classroom, and she thought about joining the broadcast committee because only their members could eat lunch in the broadcast room. As a junior high and high school student, she was part of the broadcasting club for six years and participated in several competitions and won awards.

While attending Joshibi University of Art and Design, she reconsidered broadcasting club activities after learning that the people around her had established their own ways of expressing themselves, so she started attending a narration course. After starting a class where she would appear on camera, she realized that it was a class for announcers, and she then decided to attend Amusement Media Academy's Tokyo campus. After graduating, she joined Ogipro The Next.

In January 2017, Shibasaki was cast as Chisato Chikaishi in Tsugumomo. In May 2018, she was cast as Ai in Aguu: Tensai Ningyō. In April 2021, she was cast as Liliana S. B. Heiligh in Arifureta. After spending some time as a freelancer, he transferred to Mausu Promotion on 1 February 2023. In November 2023, she was cast as Mary in The Witch and the Beast.

She voices Chiyuki Kuwayama, one of the three members of the unit Alstroemeria, in The Idolmaster Shiny Colors, a spinoff of The Idolmaster franchise. She performed in several Alstroemeria singles, one of which charted in the Top 20 of the Oricon Singles Chart. She reprised her role in the 2024 anime adaptation.

On 20 September 2020, Shibasaki announced at the "Noriko Shibasaki Birthday Event 2020" that she would make her solo music debut, with her mini-album Follow My Heart being released on 20 January 2021.

Shibasaki is a qualified museum curator.

== Filmography ==
=== Animated television ===
2013

- Gifu Dodo!! Kanetsugu and Kyōji, prostitute
- Infinite Stratos 2, Fee

2014

- Akame ga Kill!, woman
- Mushishi: Zoku-Shō, Shima's friend
- Mysterious Joker, King Mama

2015

- Kamisama Minarai: Himitsu no Cocotama, Ayaka Otsuki

2016

- Days, young Tsukushi Tsukamoto

2017

- Cinderella Nine, Shizuku Tsukahara
- Tsugumomo, Chisato Chikaishi

2018

- Aguu: Tensai Ningyō, Ai
- Boruto, Kirara
- How to Keep a Mummy, student
- Tsukumogami Kashimasu, Ohana

2019

- Arifureta, Liliana S. B. Heiligh

2020

- Sorcerous Stabber Orphen, Pat

2022

- Classroom of the Elite, waitress

2024

- The Witch and the Beast, Mary

=== Original video animation ===
2014

- The Prince of Tennis II OVA vs. Genius 10, young Renji Yanagi

=== Original net animation ===
2016

- Pokémon Generations, Skyla

=== Video games ===
2013

- S4 League

2014

- Marginal #4 Idol of Supernova
- Senjō no Enbukyoku, Mark

2015

- Chain Chronicle, Frida
- Thousand Memories, Lily
- Uchi no Hime-sama ga Ichiban Kawaii, Florence Shear
- Venus Project, Maria Yoshida

2016

- Bara ni Kakusareshi Verite, Elizabeth
- Idol Connect: AsteriskLive, Hikari Takahana
- Megido 72, Plancy
- Trickster: Shōkan Samurai ni Naritai, Licorice
- Yu-Gi-Oh! Saikyo Card Battle

2017

- Chōchō Jiken Rhapsodic, Midori Okuda
- Kurokishi to Shiro no Maou, Io
- Quiz RPG: The World of Mystic Wiz, Efa

2018

- The Idolmaster Shiny Colors, Chiyuki Kuwayama

2019

- Cinderella Nine, Shizuku Tsukahara
- Wonder Gravity, Reto
- World Flipper, Heart Leaf

2020

- Kirara Fantasia, Mayu Shinohana

2022

- Azur Lane, Volga

2023

- UsoNatsu ~The Summer Romance Bloomed From A Lie~, Kayo Asahi
