= UsoNatsu =

Japanese visual novel

- UsoNatsu ~The Summer Romance Bloomed From A Lie~

嘘から始まる恋の夏 (Uso kara Hajimaru Koi no Natsu)
- Genre: Romance, yuri
- Video game
- Developer: LYCORIS
- Publisher: Sekai Project
- Genre: Visual novel
- Platform: Microsoft Windows, Nintendo Switch
- Released: WW: November 3, 2023
- Manga

Uso kara Hajimaru Koi no Natsu -squall-
- Written by: Rococo
- Published by: Ichijinsha
- Magazine: Comic Yuri Hime
- Original run: August 17, 2024 – November 18, 2024

UsoNatsu ~The Summer Romance Bloomed From A Lie~ (Japanese: 嘘から始まる恋の夏, Hepburn: Uso kara Hajimaru Koi no Natsu) is a yuri visual novel developed by LYCORIS, that was released worldwide on November 3, 2023.

== Plot ==
The story follows the developing relationship between Kaoru Tachibana and Shiori Minagi. The two connect with each other after Shiori finds Kaoru in tears, having been rejected by their teacher, Mirei Shimotsuki, with whom Kaoru had a particularly close relationship. Having listened to Kaoru's story about Mirei, Shiori asks Kaoru if she will help Shiori forget about her older brother, as she never feels like she can live up to the comparisons between them, by overwriting her memories of her brother with memories of Kaoru instead. Kaoru agrees in hopes that it will let her forget about her how painful memories with Mirei.

The producer Yasutaka Iida describes this as an indie visual novel that takes a serious approach to yuri as a form of romance.

== Characters ==
=== Main characters ===
Kaoru Tachibana (橘 薫, Tachibana Kaoru)
Voiced by: Makoto Koichi
Shiori Minagi (御凪 栞里, Minagi Shiori)
Voiced by: Manaka Iwami
Riku Inohara (猪ノ原 莉久, Inohara Riku)
Voiced by: Konomi Fujimura
Mirei Shimotsuki (霜月 深玲, Shimotsuki Mirei)
Voiced by: Eriko Matsui

=== Supporting characters ===
Kayo Asahi (朝日 花世, Asahi Kayo)
Voiced by: Noriko Shibasaki
Koharu Tachibana (橘 小春, Tachibana Koharu)
Voiced by: Tsugumi Makita
Atsushi Tachibana (橘 敦志, Tachibana Atsushi)
Voiced by: Daisuke Kageura
Naomasa Minagi (御凪 直政, Minagi Naomasa)
Voiced by: Hiroshi Watanabe

== Release history ==
UsoNatsu ~The Summer Romance Bloomed From A Lie~ was announced on February 28, 2022.

Crowdfunding was launched on Camp Fire on April 28, 2022, with a goal of ¥2,000,000. The project raised ¥5,618,950 with the support of 365 people, successfully ending its campaign on May 31, 2022. It was initially planned to release in February 2023, however the game was delayed by LYCORIS due to the increased length of the scenarios and the extra animations needed, with a further delay announced in October 2023 due to Valve's review process. UsoNatsu was released worldwide to Steam on November 3, 2023.

A Switch port, published by Prototype, is scheduled to be released on June 18, 2026.

== Adaptations ==
On April 29, 2022, LYCORIS released a prequel voice drama, titled "Falling, In Love", to their official YouTube channel. Another voice drama adaptation was released commercially on January 19, 2024, and later published in English by Sekai Project on June 20 of the same year.

In July 2024 it was announced that a manga mini-series adaptation, titled Uso kara Hajimaru Koi no Natsu -squall-, would be serialized in Ichijinsha's Comic Yuri Hime starting the following month on August 17.

== Reception ==
Thomas Knight of NookGaming commented that the game was well worth reading thanks to its "well-paced and thoughtful story, great character dynamics, and high production values."
