= Tsugumomo =

Japanese manga series

- Cover of the first volume

つぐもも
- Genre: Harem; Romantic comedy; Supernatural
- Manga
- Written by: Yoshikazu Hamada
- Published by: Futabasha
- English publisher: NA: JManga (former)
- Imprint: Action Comics
- Magazine: Comic Seed!; WEB Comic High!; Monthly Action; Manga Action
- Original run: November 20, 2007 – present
- Volumes: 37
- Anime television series
- Directed by: Ryōichi Kuraya
- Produced by: List: Yuuichi Nakano; Toshiyuki Onuma; Taisuke Hashirayama; Gou Morita; Yukiya Sakikawa; Motohiro Oda; Shinji Horikiri; Fuminori Yamazaki; Katsunori Narumo; Eiji Maesaka; Yuuji Yoshida
- Written by: Ryōichi Kuraya
- Music by: Yasuharu Takanashi
- Studio: Zero-G
- Licensed by: Crunchyroll (Note: Previously known as Funimation, which dubbed the series prior to its acquisition by Sony Pictures Television in 2018. At that time, Crunchyroll was owned by Otter Media, which was acquired by AT&T in 2018 before divesting to Sony in 2021.)
- Original network: Animax, Tokyo MX, BS11
- Original run: April 3, 2017 – June 19, 2017
- Episodes: 12
- Original video animation
- Directed by: Ryōichi Kuraya
- Produced by: Taisuke Hashirayama; Gou Morita; Motohiro Oda
- Written by: Ryōichi Kuraya
- Music by: Yasuharu Takanashi
- Studio: Zero-G
- Released: January 22, 2020
- Runtime: 22 minutes
- Anime television series

Tsugu Tsugumomo
- Directed by: Ryōichi Kuraya
- Produced by: List: Taisuke Hashirayama; Gou Morita; Motohiro Oda; Yukiya Sakikawa; Fuminori Yamazaki; Hideyuki Kachi; Yutaka Kashiwagi; Natsuko Kawasaki; Shinji Oomori; Kentarou Suga; Tomaki Yusa; Isao Soumiya; Shizuko Tonuma; Ayaka Sugiura; Jun Hamada; Masaya Kuramoto; Hiromichi Takagi
- Written by: Ryōichi Kuraya
- Music by: Yasuharu Takanashi
- Studio: Zero-G
- Licensed by: Crunchyroll
- Original network: AT-X, Tokyo MX, Chūkyō TV, BS Fuji
- Original run: April 5, 2020 – June 21, 2020
- Episodes: 12
- icon

Tsugumomo (Japanese: つぐもも) is a Japanese manga series written and illustrated by Yoshikazu Hamada, started in 2007. Two volumes of the series were published in English by the now-defunct JManga service. An anime television series adaptation aired in 2017. A second season aired in 2020.

== Synopsis ==
Kazuya Kagami, an ordinary boy, finds his life turned upside down when his late mother's obi transforms into a girl wearing a kimono named Kiriha. She happens to be a tsukumogami called a "tsugumomo," objects that have gained a soul through long years of harmony with their owners. Kazuya has no recollection of meeting Kiriha when she exclaims "Long time no see" to him. He nearly loses his life from an attacking "amasogi", premature spirits born only to fulfill impure wishes of certain people, and Kiriha defends him. With Kiriha's arrival, Kazuya enters a reality with gods and other tsukumogami and slowly discovers his dark past.

== Characters ==
=== Main ===
Kazuya Kagami (加賀見 一也, Kagami Kazuya)
Voiced by: Yūko Sanpei (Japanese); Howard Wang (English)
Kazuya has a dark past that is hidden from himself with a seal which slowly comes undone throughout the series. He often mourns over his status as a Taboo Child, feeling responsible for the amasogi that are born around him and feeling greatly distressed upon seeing someone suffer from a severe Curse Backlash. He's quite brave, often stepping up and selflessly throwing himself into the fray to accomplish his mission as Kamioka's exorcist, as well as frequently prioritizing the safety of the host's and the others above everything else. Over the series, Kazuya comes to hold a very strong sentimental value for those he met upon becoming an exorcist, like Kukuri, Kokuyou and Kiriha. He becomes exceedingly concerned for their well-being to the point of being thrown into a great rage if he feels they are endangered.
Kiriha (桐葉)
Voiced by: Naomi Ōzora (Japanese); Sarah Wiedenheft (English)
Kiriha is a tsukumogami who used to be in a form of a white cherry blossom obi that Kazuya carries around, in a human form she appears as a teenager who is very powerful and is capable of taking down amasogi and other tsukumogami. She has a malevolent side where she enjoys roughing up others especially Kazuya and Kukuri, when in her loli form, she is basically crude, arrogant, brash, boastful, possessive, lazy, ill tempered and curses a lot, as an obi she used to belong to Kazuya's mother where the scent serves as a memento to Kazuya. She also has a perverted side where she occasionally enjoys sexually harassing Kazuya when they are alone and Kukuri as well though the former is due to her infatuation with him.
Kyōka (響華)
Voiced by: Sora Tokui
Kyōka is a flute tsukumogami who was originally a member of Mayoiga. She first appeared as part of a radical group who would wait for Kukuri to weaken and attacked Kazuya and Kukuri's other defenders. However, Kazuya defeats her and she exhausts her spirit powers, turning back into a flute. Kazuya spares her because he understood that she attacked Kukuri to protect her fellow tsukumogami at Mayoiga, who were running out of spirit power and returning to their original forms. For this reason, Kukuri returns Kyōka's flute form to Kazuya believing that Kyōka can be revived. Kazuya carries the flute with him until Kazuya is imprisoned at Tsuzura Temple along other tsukumogami users who viewed their tsukumogami as partners rather than tools. Kyōka awakens and helps the group escape from their prison and later partners with Kazuya since Kiriha had been destroyed in a previous confrontation with a resurrected Kanaka Kagami. After she partners with Kazuya she acts as a typical tsundere until she comes to understand him and starts to like him.

=== Supporting ===
Chisato Chikaishi (近石 千里, Chikaishi Chisato)
Voiced by: Noriko Shibasaki (Japanese); Megan Shipman (English)
She is Kazuya's childhood friend who has a crush on him unbeknownst to Kazuya. She is the Class Representative of Kamioka East Middle School's Class 2-2.
Kukuri (くくり)
Voiced by: Yurika Kubo (Japanese); Apphia Yu (English)
Kikurihime no Kami is the god of the land (ubusunagami), protecting Kazuya's city. She specializes in using water spells and attacks. In her adult form, she is very powerful to the point she can even beat Kiriha, though she would always wear a Noh Mask that enhances her power. But in her loli form, she is basically too weak and is no match for Kiriha even in her loli form, she would often find herself being on the receiving end of Kiriha's bullying where she would end up screaming in agony. She and her familiar Kokuyo used to live in a shrine but after suffering from financial difficulties, they both lived in a park, then in Kazuya's house after their temporary home was demolished. Unlike Kiriha who bums around, she is very helpful with household chores which pleases Kazuya's sister, Kasumi. She also likes Kazuya and hopes that she can marry him and have a family.
Kokuyō (黒耀)
Voiced by: Eriko Matsui (Japanese); Leah Clark (English)
She is a voluptuous woman who is also a raven spirit; she serves as Kukuri's familiar. She has a big appetite where there is a running gag that everything she eats goes to her huge breasts. Due to the shrine's huge debt she has to work at lot of odd jobs that include working construction to working as a cashier at a supermarket. She appears to be infatuated with Kazuya like many of the other female characters although, later after witnessing Kazuya showing concern over her injured, she begins to develop deeper feelings for him.
Sunao Sumeragi (皇 すなお, Sumeragi Sunao)
Voiced by: Yō Taichi (Japanese); Megan Emerick (English)
She is a malison cleaner belonging to a long line of malison cleaners. She challenges Kazuya to a duel over his rights as a malison cleaner, and loses. Due to her loss, the only way she can inherit her family's swordsmanship school is by marrying Kazuya. She does show hints of feelings towards Kazuya at times, but she is extremely embarrassed.
Kotetsu (虎鉄)
Voiced by: Rumi Okubo (Japanese); Orion Pitts (English)
He is a tsugumomo who is in a form of a Katana, he basically serves Sunao Sumeragi.
Kasumi Kagami (加賀見 霞, Kagami Kasumi)
Voiced by: Ayana Taketatsu (Japanese); Jeannie Tirado (English)
She is Kazuya's elder sister, who is in high school and is often in charge with the household chores. Though she doesn't show it often, she actually has a brother complex towards Kazuya. Among the people in the household she is the only one whom Kiriha would dare not mess with.
Shirou Shiramine (白峰 四郎, Shiramine Shirō)
Voiced by: Sachi Kokuryu (Japanese); Kyle Igneczi (English)
Tadataka Tadata (只田 忠孝, Tadata Tadataka)
Voiced by: Mikako Komatsu (Japanese); Ryan Reynolds (English)
He is the Student Council President at Kamioka East Middle School.
Akito Ashimine (安次峰 あきと, Ashimine Akito)
Voiced by: Shogo Sakata
Arumi Ashimine (安次峰 あるみ, Ashimine Arumi)
Voiced by: Riho Sugiyama
Mimane Miyou (美鷹みまね, Miyou Mimane)
Voiced by: Mami Uchida
She is a mirror tsukumogami and was a member of Mayoiga. After their defend, tsukumogami of Mayoiga surrender and was sent to Tsuzura Temple where she along with her fellow was tsukumogami was held captive by the Assistant Head Priest Masuji Madarai. After Madarai was defeated by Kazuya, the tsukumogami was set free and in return for Kazuya's help, Mimane becomes his tsukumogami. Mimane becomes helpful to Kazuya, using her mirror to teleport oncoming attacks. Her mirror world includes a house which becomes a resting place for Kazuya and his tsukumogami on their travels. She also shows be fascinated with Kazuya's naked body and usually watches him perform Spiritual Intercourse with his tsukumogami with her mirrors.
Azami (あざみ, Azami)
Voiced by: Yūko Ōno
Shinobu (糸信, Miyou Mimane)
She is a sewing needle tsukumogami and was a member of Mayoiga. She along her fellow tsukumogami was held captive by Madarai and was freed by Kazuya and Kyōka. To show her appreciation for Kazuya freeing her, she repairs Kiriha's obi which revives Kiriha. Shinobu eventually becomes Kazuya's tsukumogami, she can use her needles to attack enemies and to repair objects.
Sosogu (そそぐ, Sosogu)
Sosogu is a tokkuri tsukumogami and was a member of Mayoiga. Like her fellow tsukumogami, she was held captive by Madarai until she was freed by Kazuya and Kyōka. Sosogu becomes one of Kazuya's tsukumogami, her powers allow her to brew various potions with different effects on the drinker such as increase speed or power and healing although overconsumption of Sosogu's potions will have a negative side-effect on the user such as increase uncontrollable lust.

=== Others ===
Osamu Osanai (小山内 治, Osanai Osamu)
Voiced by: Shiho Sasaki (Japanese); Stephen Fu (English)
Kanaka Kagami (加賀見 奏歌, Kagami Kanaka)
Voiced by: Kotono Mitsuishi (Japanese); Brittney Karbowski (English)
Mother of Kazuya Kagami.
Kazuaki Kagami (加賀見 一明, Kagami Kazuaki)
Voiced by: Hiroki Gotō (Japanese); Sonny Strait (English)
Father of Kazuya Kagami.
Suzuri Sumeragi (皇 すずり, Sumeragi Suzuri)
Voiced by: Hiromi Igarashi (Japanese); Morgan Garrett (English)
Mother of Sunao Sumeragi.
Taguri Kanayama (金山 たぐり, Kanayama Taguri)
Voiced by: M.A.O (Japanese); Amber Lee Connors (English)

== Media ==
=== Manga ===
Tsugumomo is written and illustrated by Yoshikazu Hamada, who began serializing the manga on November 20, 2007. The series was initially published in Futabasha's Comic Seed! web magazine, before being moved to their WEB Comic High! magazine on August 20, 2008. It later switched to the publisher's new Monthly Action magazine with the first issue on May 25, 2013. After Monthly Action closed on February 24, 2024, it transferred to Manga Action.

The first volume of the series was one of the titles made available in English upon the launch of the digital manga publishing website JManga on August 17, 2011. The second volume was added on March 22, 2012. Those two volumes were the only ones published before the company shut down in May 2013.

No.	Japanese release date	Japanese ISBN
1	June 28, 2008	978-4-575-83509-0
2	April 11, 2009	978-4-575-83609-7
3	October 10, 2009	978-4-575-83682-0
4	May 12, 2010	978-4-575-83768-1
5	November 12, 2010	978-4-575-83837-4
6	July 12, 2011	978-4-575-83926-5
7	January 12, 2012	978-4-575-84018-6
8	June 12, 2012	978-4-575-84081-0
9	September 12, 2012	978-4-575-84127-5
10	February 12, 2013	978-4-575-84194-7
11	July 12, 2013	978-4-575-84261-6
12	February 10, 2014	978-4-575-84344-6
13	June 10, 2014	978-4-575-84425-2
14	January 9, 2015	978-4-575-84559-4
15	May 9, 2015	978-4-575-84617-1
16	October 10, 2015	978-4-575-84703-1
17	April 12, 2016	978-4-575-84782-6
18	September 12, 2016	978-4-575-84849-6
19	March 11, 2017	978-4-575-84939-4
20	November 10, 2017	978-4-575-85056-7
21	June 12, 2018	978-4-575-85166-3
22	November 12, 2018	978-4-575-85228-8
23	March 12, 2019	978-4-575-85290-5
24	January 22, 2020	978-4-575-85386-5; 978-4-575-85387-2 (SP)
25	May 12, 2020	978-4-575-85446-6
26	December 10, 2020	978-4-575-85522-7
27	June 10, 2021	978-4-575-85591-3
28	February 12, 2022	978-4-575-85690-3
29	August 10, 2022	978-4-575-85745-0
30	February 9, 2023	978-4-575-85803-7
31	July 12, 2023	978-4-575-85862-4
32	February 8, 2024	978-4-575-85935-5
33	August 8, 2024	978-4-575-85994-2
34	February 13, 2025	978-4-575-86055-9
35	September 11, 2025	978-4-575-86128-0
36	March 12, 2026	978-4-575-86200-3
37	September 26, 2026	978-4-575-86271-3

=== Anime ===
An anime adaptation of the series was announced via a wraparound band on the 18th volume of the manga on September 12, 2016, and was later confirmed to be a television series. It premiered in April 2017. The anime television series is directed and had scripts written by Ryōichi Kuraya at studio Zero-G. Yasuharu Takanashi composed the music at Pony Canyon. The anime aired from April 3 to June 19, 2017, on Animax, Tokyo MX and BS11. The series ran for 12 episodes. Prior to its acquisition by Sony Pictures Television, Crunchyroll streamed the series with original Japanese audio and English subtitles, while Funimation (which was renamed itself to Crunchyroll in 2022) dubbed it and released it on home video in North America.

A 20-minute original video animation was also produced through crowdfunding. It was bundled with the manga's 24th volume released on January 22, 2020.

A second season titled Tsugu Tsugumomo aired from April 5 to June 21, 2020, with the staff and cast members reprising their roles.

== Reception ==
=== Sales ===
The 7th volume of the series ranked at 22nd place on the Oricon manga sales chart, selling 19,102 copies; the 9th volume ranked at 29th place, with 23,470 copies sold; the 10th volume also ranked at 29th, with 24,454 copies sold; the 12th volume reached 16th place, with 22,500 copies sold; the 13th volume ranked at 24th place, with 22,551 copies sold; the 15th volume ranked at 42nd place, with 24,145 copies sold; the 17th volume reached 45th place, with 17,843 copies sold, and the 18th volume ranked at 44th place, with 19,563 copies sold.
