= Ichigo Takano =

Japanese manga artist

- 高野苺
- Pronunciation: たかの いちご
- Born: January 11, 1986 (age 40); Nagano, Japan
- Occupation: Manga artist
- Years active: 2002–present
- Notable work: Orange, Dreamin' Sun
- Website: https://www.choco-de.net/

Ichigo Takano (Japanese: 高野苺, Hepburn: Takano Ichigo; born January 11, 1986) is a Japanese manga artist from Nagano in Japan and is best known for Orange.

== Biography ==
Takano made her debut in high school in 2002 with START. She first achieved success with her work Dreamin' Sun. Takano is also the creator and author of New York Times bestseller Orange. After beginning serialization in Shueisha's Bessatsu Margaret in 2012, Orange was abruptly suspended from the January 2013 issue. It was later picked up by Futabasha's Monthly Action in February 2014 where it continued to be serialized until 2015.

== Works ==
- START (2002) – (serialized in Shueisha's Bessatsu Margaret)
- Ookami Shounen (オオカミ少年) (2004) – (serialized in Shuiesha's Margaret)
- Itoshi Kingyo (愛し金魚) (2006) – (serialized in Bessatsu Margaret)
- Shooting Star (シューティング スター) (2006)
- Bambi no Tegami (バンビの手紙) (2007) – (serialized in Bessatsu Margaret)
- Dreamin' Sun (夢みる太陽) (2007-2011) – (serialized in Bessatsu Margaret)
- Orange (2012-2017) – (serialized in Bessatsu Margaret and Futabasha's Monthly Action)
- Orange (2015-2016) – (light novel)
- ReCollection (2013-) – (serialized in Monthly Action)
- Kimi ni Nare (君になれ) (2018-) – (serialized in Monthly Action)

== Filmography ==
In 2015, the film Orange was released based on the manga in Japan. A 13-episode anime adaptation of Orange was produced by Telecom Animation Film in 2016 and was simulcast by Crunchyroll.
