= Dreamin' Sun =

Japanese slice of life romance shōjo manga series

- Cover of the first volume of the series, published by Shueisha

夢みる太陽 (Yumemiru Taiyō)
- Genre: Romantic comedy
- Manga
- Written by: Ichigo Takano
- Published by: Shueisha; Futabasha
- English publisher: NA: Seven Seas Entertainment
- Magazine: Bessatsu Margaret; Monthly Action
- Original run: 13 October 2007 – 11 August 2011
- Volumes: 10

Dreamin' Sun (夢みる太陽, Yumemiru Taiyō) is a Japanese romantic comedy manga series written and illustrated by Ichigo Takano. It was serialized in Shueisha's Bessatsu Margaret manga magazine and compiled into 10 volumes published between 2008 and 2011. The manga is published in English by Seven Seas Entertainment.

== Plot ==
Shimana Kameko has suffered depression since her mother died, while her father remarried and had a second child with a wife she cannot tolerate. In the morning, Shimana runs away from home and meets Taiyō Fujiwara, who allows her to live in his house as long as they trust each other.

== Characters ==
Shimana Kameko (亀戸 しま奈, Kameko Shimana)
Shimana is a teenager who runs away from her home upon being torn apart by her remarrying after her mother's death. She is ashamed of her name, and dislikes the fact that her father remarried and had another child, Yura. As she runs away from home, she runs into a man dressed in a kimono sleeping in park, who offered her a place to stay in exchange for fulfilling three conditions.
Taiyō "Taiga" Fujiwara (藤原 虎・太陽, Fujiwara Taiga Taiyō)
Taiga is the landlord of the house where Zen and Asahi live. He is seen wearing a kimono and a prosecutor like his father. Taiga offers Shimana a place to live after falling asleep in a park after a night of drinking.
Zen Nakajō (中城 善, Nakajō Zen)
Zen is Shimana's classmate who lives in Taiga's house. He is often seen admiring pandas and a fan of kung-fu.
Asahi Tatsugae (龍ヶ江 朝陽, Tatsugae Asahi)
Asahi is a student who attends the same school as Shimana and one year senior to her. He is seen at school wearing glasses and reading books, but changes in appearance when he is not in this state of studying. Asahi has a crush on his childhood friend Manami.

== Media ==
=== Manga ===
The original series is written and illustrated by Ichigo Takano, and was serialized in Shueisha's Bessatsu Margaret from October 13, 2007, to August 11, 2011. The series was later published into tankōbon volumes, with the first volume being released on March 25, 2008, and the final volume being released on November 25, 2011. The series was later redrawn by Takano, with the redrawn series published by Futabasha. Futabasha published the redrawn series from December 12, 2015, to April 28, 2017.

The series is licensed in English in North America by Seven Seas Entertainment, who is publishing the Futabasha version of the series. The first volume was published on May 2, 2017.

==== Volume list ====
No.	Original release date	Original ISBN	English release date	English ISBN
1	March 25, 2008 (Shueisha); December 12, 2015 (Futabasha)	978-4-08-846281-3 (Shueisha); ISBN 978-4-575-84727-7 (Futabasha)	May 2, 2017	978-1-626925-25-0
2	September 25, 2008 (Shueisha); December 12, 2015 (Futabasha)	978-4-08-846336-0 (Shueisha); ISBN 978-4-575-84728-4 (Futabasha)	July 11, 2017	978-1-626925-27-4
3	March 25, 2009 (Shueisha); February 12, 2016 (Futabasha)	978-4-08-846395-7 (Shueisha); ISBN 978-4-575-84739-0 (Futabasha)	September 19, 2017	978-1-626925-45-8
4	August 25, 2009; April 28, 2016 (Futabasha)	978-4-08-846436-7 (Shueisha); ISBN 978-4-575-84751-2 (Futabasha)	November 7, 2017	978-1-626925-75-5
5	December 25, 2009; June 28, 2016 (Futabasha)	978-4-08-846479-4 (Shueisha); ISBN 978-4-575-84814-4 (Futabasha)	January 2, 2018	978-1-626926-71-4
6	April 23, 2010; August 27, 2016 (Futabasha)	978-4-08-846516-6 (Shueisha); ISBN 978-4-575-84839-7 (Futabasha)	April 3, 2018	978-1-626927-20-9
7	September 24, 2010; October 28, 2016 (Futabasha)	978-4-08-846569-2 (Shueisha); ISBN 978-4-575-84868-7 (Futabasha)	July 31, 2018	978-1-626928-26-8
8	January 25, 2011; December 28, 2016 (Futabasha)	978-4-08-846618-7 (Shueisha); ISBN 978-4-575-84902-8 (Futabasha)	October 30, 2018	978-1-626929-15-9
9	May 25, 2011; February 28, 2017 (Futabasha)	978-4-08-846655-2 (Shueisha); ISBN 978-4-575-84931-8 (Futabasha)	May 28, 2019	978-1-626929-74-6
10	November 25, 2011; February 28, 2017 (Futabasha)	978-4-08-846721-4 (Shueisha); ISBN 978-4-575-84962-2 (Futabasha)	August 13, 2019	978-1-642750-22-5

== Reception ==
Volume 8 reached the 13th place on the weekly Oricon manga chart and has sold 41,147 copies as of January 30, 2011; volume 9 reached the 14th place and has sold 42,809 copies as of May 29, 2011; volume 10 reached the 27th place and has sold 66,309 copies as of December 4, 2011.

On manga-news.com, Dreamin' Sun has a staff grade of 13.67 out of 20. On Manga Sanctuary, it has a staff grade from one staff member of 7 out of 10. On planetebd.com, it has a staff grade of "good, nice".

== See also ==
- Orange, another manga series by the same author
