= How to Melt the Ice Queen's Heart =

Japanese light novel written by Kakeru Takamine

- Volume 1 cover of the Japanese light novel

氷の令嬢の溶かし方 (Kouri no Reijou no Tokashi Kata)
- Genre: Romantic comedy; Slice of life
- Light novel
- Written by: Kakeru Takamine
- Illustrated by: Ichigo Kagawa
- Published by: Futabasha
- English publisher: Tentai Books
- Imprint: Monster Bunko
- Original run: September 30, 2020 – March 29, 2021
- Volumes: 2
- Manga
- Written by: Kakeru Takamine
- Illustrated by: Tokomichi
- Published by: Futabasha
- Imprint: Monster Comics
- Magazine: Gaugau Monster
- Original run: January 16, 2022 – July 14, 2023
- Volumes: 3

How to Melt the Ice Queen's Heart (Japanese: 氷の令嬢の溶かし方, Hepburn: Kōri no Reijō no Tokashi Kata) is a Japanese romantic comedy light novel series written by Kakeru Takamine and illustrated by Ichigo Kagawa. The series was published by Futabasha under the Monster Bunko label in Japanese language and Tentai Books in English language. The first volume was released on September 30, 2020, in Japanese and currently has 2 volumes. Tentai Books released the digital version of first volume on July 26, 2021, in English language. In early April, Futabasha decided to discontinue the light novel series after the second volume because it didn't sell well in Japan. A manga adaptation illustrated by Tokomichi was serialized on Futabasha's Gaugau Monster manga website from January 16, 2022, to July 14, 2023.

== Characters ==
- Kagami Asahi
- Fuyuka Himuro
- Chiaki Kikkawa
- Hinami Aiba

== Volumes ==
=== Light novel ===
No.	Original release date	Original ISBN	English release date	English ISBN
1	September 30, 2020	978-4-575-75275-5	July 26, 2021	978-8-412-35466-9
2	March 29, 2021	978-4-575-75287-8	March 3, 2023	—

=== Manga ===
No.	Original release date	Original ISBN	English release date	English ISBN
1	May 30, 2022	978-4-575-41425-7	—	—
2	December 12, 2022	978-4-575-41551-3	—	—
3	July 14, 2023	—	—	—
