= Shikizakura =

Japanese anime television series

- Poster of Shikizakura

シキザクラ
- Genre: Science fiction
- Created by: Sublimation
- Manga
- Written by: Hayato Aoki
- Published by: Futabasha
- Magazine: Monthly Action
- Original run: December 25, 2020 – November 25, 2022
- Volumes: 4
- Anime television series
- Directed by: Shinya Sugai (Chief); Gō Kurosaki
- Produced by: Tomoyasu Nishimura
- Written by: Naruki Nagakawa
- Music by: Takumi Saitou
- Studio: Sublimation
- Licensed by: Sentai Filmworks
- Original network: Chukyo TV, Nippon TV, ABS, FBS
- Original run: October 10, 2021 – December 26, 2021
- Episodes: 12

Shikizakura (Japanese: シキザクラ) is an anime television series co-produced by Chukyo TV and animation studio Sublimation. The series is chief directed by Shinya Sugai, directed by Gō Kurosaki, and features character designs by Manabu Nakatake. The series aired from October to December 2021.

== Plot ==
A high school student gets involved in a battle between powered suits and oni that emerge from the demon world to prey on humans.

== Characters ==
Kakeru Miwa (三輪 翔, Miwa Kakeru)
Voiced by: Yūdai Noda (Japanese); Bryson Baugus, Brittney Karbowski (young) (English)
Ōka Myōjin (明神 逢花, Myōjin Ōka)
Voiced by: Miho Mashiro (Japanese); Melissa Molano (English)
Kippei Nagatsu (永津 吉平, Nagatsu Kippei)
Voiced by: Daisuke Nakamoto (Japanese); Clint Bickham (English)
Ryō Hattori (服部 涼, Hattori Ryō)
Voiced by: Shōto Mizukami (Japanese); Jeremy Gee (English)
Kaede Naruse (成瀬 楓, Naruse Kaede)
Voiced by: Eri Sakazaki (Japanese); Alyssa Marek (English)
Haruko Yamada (山田 春子, Yamada Haruko)
Voiced by: Natsuki Ochiai (Japanese); Cat Thomas (English)
Ibara (イバラ)
Voiced by: Shingo Yoneyama (Japanese); Courtland Johnson (English)
Benio Myōjin (明神 紅緒, Myōjin Benio)
Voiced by: Miki Yakata (Japanese); Christie Guidry (English)
Issa Inuzuka (犬塚 一左)
Voiced by: Iwori (Japanese); Ty Mahany (English)
Ukon Kijima (雉嶋 右近)
Voiced by: Yūto Arai (Japanese); Blake Weir (English)

== Media ==
=== Anime ===
The series was announced by Chukyo TV and CG studio Sublimation on October 1, 2018. Shinya Sugai is chief directing the series, with Gō Kurosaki serving as director, Tomoyasu Nishimura serving as producer, Manabu Nakatake adapting Ryōga Inoue's character designs for animation, and Takumi Saitou composing the music and directing the sound. It is scheduled to consist of twelve 30-minute episodes. The series aired from October 10 to December 26, 2021. Asaka performed the series' opening theme song "BELIEVE MYSELF", while May'n performed the series' ending theme song "Shikizakura". Sentai Filmworks licensed the series.

No.	Title	Directed by	Written by	Storyboarded by	Original release date
1	"Hope / Start"; Transliteration: "Kibō/Sutāto" (Japanese: 希望/START)	Gō Kurosaki	Naruki Nagakawa	Gō Kurosaki	October 10, 2021
2	"United Front / Tag"; Transliteration: "Kyōtō/Taggu" (Japanese: 共闘/TAG)	Makoto Satō; Keita Watanabe	Naruki Nagakawa	Naoya Andō	October 17, 2021
3	"Flight / Jump"; Transliteration: "Hishō/Janpu" (Japanese: 飛翔/JUMP)	Kaito Hamakawa; Yū Satō	Naruki Nagakawa	Takahiko Kyōgoku	October 24, 2021
4	"Family / Brother"; Transliteration: "Kazoku/Burazā" (Japanese: 家族/BROTHER)	Ippei Yokota	Naruki Nagakawa	Shūji Yoshikawa	October 31, 2021 (Note: This episode aired at 1:00 a.m. JST, 5 minutes after the original air time on Chukyo TV.)
5	"Black Team / Sister"; Transliteration: "Kuro-gumi/Shisutā" (Japanese: 黒組/SISTER)	Makoto Satō; Keita Watanabe	Naruki Nagakawa	Hiroshi Nishikiori	November 7, 2021
6	"Partner / Ibara"; Transliteration: "Aibō/Ibara" (Japanese: 相棒/IBARA)	Yū Satō; Kaito Hamakawa	Naruki Nagakawa	Kazuo Sakai	November 14, 2021
7	"Smile/Real"; Transliteration: "Egao/Riaru" (Japanese: 笑顔/REAL)	Akihiro Shibata	Takayuki Nakanishi; Naruki Nagakawa	Shūji Yoshikawa	November 21, 2021
8	"Dearest Wish/Mother"; Transliteration: "Higan/Mazā" (Japanese: 悲願/MOTHER)	Makoto Satō; Keita Watanabe	Naruki Nagakawa	Gō Kurosaki	November 28, 2021
9	"Escape/Stop"; Transliteration: "Tōhi/Sutoppu" (Japanese: 逃避/STOP)	Kaito Hamakawa; Yū Satō	Naruki Nagakawa	Ryōsuke Ogata	December 5, 2021
10	"Determination/Re:Start"; Transliteration: "Ketsui/Ri:Sutāto" (Japanese: 決意/RE:START)	Yū Satō; Kaito Hamakawa	Naruki Nagakawa	Takayoshi Nagatomo	December 12, 2021
11	"Pulse/Climax"; Transliteration: "Myakudō/Kuraimakkusu" (Japanese: 脈動/CLIMAX)	Makoto Satō; Keita Watanabe	Naruki Nagakawa	Seung-hui Son	December 19, 2021
12	"Future/Shikizakura"; Transliteration: "Mirai/Shikizakura" (Japanese: 未来/SHIKIZAKURA)	Gō Kurosaki	Naruki Nagakawa	Gō Kurosaki	December 26, 2021

=== Manga ===
A manga adaptation written and illustrated by Hayato Aoki was serialized in Futabasha's Monthly Action magazine from December 25, 2020, to November 25, 2022.

No.	Japanese release date	Japanese ISBN
1	September 9, 2021	978-4-575-85634-7
2	December 9, 2021	978-4-575-85664-4
3	July 12, 2022	978-4-575-85733-7
4	January 12, 2023	978-4-575-85804-4
