= Shōnen Ashibe =

Japanese manga series

- First tankōbon volume cover, featuring Ashibe Ashiya and his Goma-chan

少年アシベ
- Genre: Comedy, slice of life
- Manga
- Written by: Hiromi Morishita
- Published by: Shueisha
- Imprint: Young Jump Comics
- Magazine: Weekly Young Jump
- Original run: 1988 – 1994
- Volumes: 8
Further information
Original video animation
Directed by	Noboru Ishiguro
Music by	Toshiyuki Arakawa
Studio	Nippon Animation
Released	January 21, 1991 – July 27, 1991
Runtime	50 minutes
Episodes	6
Anime television series
Directed by	Susumu Ishizaki
Music by	Toshiyuki Arakawa
Studio	Life Work
Original network	TBS
Original run	April 11, 1991 – March 27, 1993
Episodes	62
Manga
ComaGoma
Written by	Hiromi Morishita
Published by	Shueisha
Magazine	Weekly Young Jump
Original run	October 12, 2000 – March 25, 2004
Volumes	6
Manga
Shōnen Ashibe Go! Go! Goma-chan
Written by	Hiromi Morishita
Illustrated by	Junko Ogino
Published by	Futabasha
Magazine	Monthly Action (2016–2017); Manga Town (2017–2018)
Original run	April 1, 2016 – March 5, 2018
Volumes	3
Anime television series
Shōnen Ashibe Go! Go! Goma-chan
Directed by	Nobuhiro Kondō
Written by	Toshimitsu Takeuchi (S1–S3); Masashi Sogo (S4)
Music by	Kenji Kato; Hiromi Mizutani (38–120)
Studio	Bridge (S1–S3); Husio Studio (S1 & S2); Studio Palette (S3 & S4); Shin-Ei Animation (S4)
Original network	NHK Educational TV
Original run	April 5, 2016 – December 17, 2019
Episodes	120
Manga
Seishōnen Ashibe
Written by	Hiromi Morishita
Illustrated by	Shōhei
Published by	Futabasha
Magazine	Monthly Action (2017–2024); Web Action (2024)
Original run	July 25, 2017 – November 8, 2024
Volumes	9
Manga
Shō 3 Ashibe QQ Goma-chan
Written by	Hiromi Morishita
Published by	Futabasha
Magazine	Manga Action
Original run	March 17, 2020 – present
Volumes	4
Anime television series
Shō 3 Ashibe QQ Goma-chan
Directed by	Kōtarō Yamawaki
Produced by	Ayumi Kanno
Music by	Kyōhei Matsuno
Studio	DLE
Original network	TV Tokyo
Original run	April 12, 2026 – present
Episodes	1
- icon

Shōnen Ashibe (少年アシベ; lit. 'Boy Ashibe') is a Japanese manga series written and illustrated by Hiromi Morishita. It was serialized in Shueisha's seinen manga magazine Weekly Young Jump from 1988 to 1994, with its chapters collected in eight tankōbon volumes. It follows the daily life of Ashibe, an elementary school boy, and his family and friends, including his spotted seal pup named Goma-chan.

It received a six-episode original video animation (OVA) adaptation in 1991, which led to an anime television series adaptation aired on TBS in that same year; a second season aired from 1992 to 1993. A second manga series, titled ComaGoma, which depicts Ashibe as a second grade student, was serialized in Weekly Young Jump from 2000 to 2004, with its chapters collected in six volumes.

A second anime television series adaptation, titled Shōnen Ashibe Go! Go! Goma-chan, was broadcast for four seasons on NHK Educational TV from 2016 to 2019. A manga adaptation of Shōnen Ashibe Go! Go! Goma-chan, illustrated by Junko Ogino, was published in Futabasha's Monthly Action and Manga Town from 2016 to 2018, and its chapters were collected in three volumes.

Another manga series illustrated by Shōhei, titled Seishōnen Ashibe, was serialized in Monthly Action, and later on the Web Action website, from 2017 to 2024. It depicts an older Ashibe as a freshman in high school. In 2020, Morishita started another manga series, titled Shō 3 Ashibe QQ Goma-chan, which depicts Ashibe as a third grade student. A short anime television series adaptation of Shō 3 Ashibe QQ Goma-chan premiered in April 2026.

== Plot ==
Ashibe Ashiya is close friends with his classmate Sugao Anan. However, his father accidentally starts a fire in a house under construction, forcing him and Ashibe to move into an apartment in another area; Ashibe also has to transfer schools. Shortly after moving, Ashibe is walking down the street when a white object falls out of a passing truck. They initially thought it was a fish, but later found out it was a baby seal, which they decided to name "Goma-chan" and raise it.

== Media ==
=== Manga ===
Written and illustrated by Hiromi Morishita, Shōnen Ashibe was serialized in Shueisha's seinen manga magazine Weekly Young Jump from 1988 to 1994. Shueisha collected its chapters in eight tankōbon volumes, released from April 19, 1989, to March 18, 1994. Shueisha republished the series in four bunkoban volumes from August 10 to October 18, 2001. Futabasha released two volumes, consisting of selected stories, on April 28 and November 12, 2011, and republished the eight volumes from April 1, 2016, to March 28, 2017.

==== Sequels ====
A second manga series, titled ComaGoma, following Ashibe as a second grade student, was serialized in Weekly Young Jump from October 12, 2000, to March 25, 2004. (Note: It finished in the magazine's 17th issue of 2004, released on March 25 of that same year.) Shueisha collected its chapters in six tankōbon volumes, released from November 20, 2001, to July 16, 2004. Futabasha republished the six volumes, under the title ComaGoma Goma-chan (COMAGOMA ゴマちゃん), from June 12, 2017, to April 12, 2018.

A third manga series, titled Shō 3 Ashibe QQ Goma-chan (小3アシベ QQゴマちゃん), following Ashibe as a third grade student, started in Manga Action on March 17, 2020. Futabasha collected its chapters in nine volumes, released from April 25, 2022, to February 27, 2025.

==== Other series ====
A manga adaptation of Shōnen Ashibe Go! Go! Goma-chan, illustrated by Junko Ogino, was serialized in Futabasha's Monthly Action from April 25, 2016, to February 25, 2017, and was later transferred to the publisher's Manga Town starting on May 2 of that same year, and concluded on March 5, 2018. Futabasha collected its chapters in three volumes; the first two volumes were published on September 12, 2016, and January 12, 2017, respectively, and the third volume was published digitally-only on April 12, 2018.

Another manga series illustrated by Shōhei, titled Seishōnen Ashibe (青少年アシベ), which depicts an older Ashibe as a freshman in high school, started in Monthly Action on July 25, 2017; the magazine ended in February 2024, and the series moved to the publisher's Web Action website, where it finished on November 8, 2024. Futabasha released the first volume on April 12, 2018. As of March 12, 2024, eight volumes have been released.

=== Anime ===
==== 1991–1994 series ====
A six-episode original video animation (OVA) adaptation, animated by Nippon Animation and distributed by Pony Canyon, was released between January 21 and July 21, 1991. A 37-episode anime television series, animated by Life Work, was broadcast on TBS from April 11 to December 28, 1991. It was followed by a 25-episode second season broadcast from October 3, 1992, to March 27, 1993.

==== Shōnen Ashibe Go! Go! Goma-chan ====
A second anime television series, titled Shōnen Ashibe Go! Go! Goma-chan (少年アシベ GO！GO！ゴマちゃん), animated by Bridge and Husio Studio, directed by Nobuhiro Kondo, with series composition by Toshimitsu Takeuchi, was broadcast for 32 episodes on NHK Educational TV from April 5, 2016, to February 21, 2017.

A second season, animated by the same studios of the first season, was broadcast for 32 episodes from April 4, 2017, to February 13, 2018.

A third season, animated by Bridge and Studio Palette, was broadcast for 32 episodes from April 3, 2018, to February 26, 2019.

A fourth season, animated by Shin-Ei Animation and Studio Palette, with series composition by Masashi Sogo, was broadcast for 24 episodes from April 2 to December 17, 2019.

==== Shō 3 Ashibe QQ Goma-chan ====
In November 2025, a short anime television series adaptation of Shō 3 Ashibe QQ Goma-chan was announced. It is animated by DLE and directed by Kōtarō Yamawaki, who also designed the characters, with music composed by Kyōhei Matsuno. Ayumi Kanno serves as the producer. The series premiered on April 12, 2026, within TV Tokyo's Animori! program.

=== Video game ===
An adventure video game based on the manga, titled Shōnen Ashibe: Nepal Daibōken no Maki (少年アシベ ネパール大冒険の巻), was released for the Nintendo Famicom by Takara on November 15, 1991.

== Reception ==
With its anime adaptation, the manga increased in popularity. The manga has sold 20 million copies.
