= The Witch and the Beast =

Japanese manga series

- First tankōbon volume cover

魔女と野獣 (Majo to Yajū)
- Genre: Adventure; Dark fantasy; Thriller
- Manga
- Written by: Kousuke Satake
- Published by: Kodansha
- English publisher: NA: Kodansha USA
- Magazine: Young Magazine the 3rd (November 6, 2016 – April 6, 2021); Monthly Young Magazine (May 20, 2021 – present)
- Original run: November 6, 2016 – present
- Volumes: 10
- Anime television series
- Directed by: Takayuki Hamana
- Written by: Yūichirō Momose
- Music by: Hanae Nakamura; Natsumi Tabuchi
- Studio: Yokohama Animation Laboratory
- Licensed by: Crunchyroll (streaming); SEA: Plus Media Networks Asia
- Original network: TBS, BS11, RKK, TBS Channel 1
- Original run: January 12, 2024 – April 5, 2024
- Episodes: 12
- icon

The Witch and the Beast (Japanese: 魔女と野獣, Hepburn: Majo to Yajū) is a Japanese manga series written and illustrated by Kousuke Satake. It started serialization in Young Magazine the 3rd in November 2016, before moving to Monthly Young Magazine following Young Magazine the 3rd publishing its final issue.

The series went on an initial two-month hiatus after January 2023, which was later extended upon due to Satake's health. As of August 2022, its individual chapters have been collected in 10 tankōbon volumes.

An anime television series adaptation produced by Yokohama Animation Laboratory aired from January to April 2024.

== Synopsis ==
=== Setting ===
The world consists of eight continents where magic saturates the environment, influencing both nature and civilization. Magical disasters are collectively called "Paranomena", while spellcasting involves inscribing runes, known as "Lettering", either in the air or on prepared surfaces. The Global Holy Church regulates magic from its seat on the First Continent, with technological advancement decreasing in more distant lands. However, the eighth continent is able to develop its own unique brand of magic technology, allowing it and the seventh continent to have prosperous societies. Between them lies the Fall, a seventeen-tiered abyss created by the Origin Witches, each level containing its own isolated world known only to the powerful elites.

The Church's Paladin Corps handles major magical threats, while their Executioners branch ruthlessly hunts all witches. Three holy women lead the Church: the Healer, the Defender, and the Seer, who periodically awakens to prophesize future turning points called the Great Flow. Witches descend from the seventeen Origin Witches, inheriting vast power marked by Ultoma sigils when casting spells. Though outwardly human, they live two centuries without aging. Humans who master magic become mages, with the five strongest recognized as Archmages. Magic interferes with machinery unless purified, and practitioners can be neutralized through pressure points or finger injuries. Other beings like the nearly immortal vampires are capable of challenging mages.

The Order of Magical Resonance, an independent coalition of magic-wielders and supernatural beings, frequently opposes the Church's methods but maintains an uneasy truce to prevent outright war.

=== Plot ===
The story follows Ashaf, a tall, soft-spoken agent of the Order of Magical Resonance, and his unruly partner, Guideau, whose soul resides in a female body, yet her true form is that of a powerful, masked "beast", contained within a coffin strapped to Ashaf's back. They are tasked by the Order of Magical Resonance to solve cases involving magic, especially those concerning witches. As they go about their missions, they travel the world seeking a particular infamous witch, Angela Anne Huell, who casts a curse on Guideau and is the only Origin witch still alive.

Due to unknown reasons, Forbidden Instruments, dark magical tools that grant the wielders immense power at the cost of blood sacrifices, are being spread around the world. At the core of it, Angela and a coven of witches and mages are prophesized to become a "great enemy" to society, causing the Order and the Holy Church to scramble to stop them.

== Characters ==
=== Main characters ===
Guideau (ギド, Gido)
Voiced by: Yō Taichi (Japanese); Rowan Gilvie (English)
A mysterious "beast", Guideau is trapped in a female form due to a witch's curse, but her real form is a powerful masked man with a pitch-black right arm and is the "natural enemy" of witches. She reluctantly works with the Order of Magical Resonance to find the witch who hexed her and break the curse. Guideau can temporarily release the curse by kissing a witch, but it only works once per witch. Although she inhabits a witch's body, Guideau cannot use magic, but has superhuman abilities, such as enhanced strength and heightened senses.
Guideau is foul-mouthed, aggressive, egocentric, and ignorant about many aspects of the world. Her tendency towards violence and her burning hatred for witches tends to cloud her judgement, but she can be rational and is learning more self-control. While single-minded in her goal and apathetic to everything else, Guideau has slowly developed a trusting and somewhat abrasive partnership with Ashaf.
Ashaf (アシャフ, Ashafu)
Voiced by: Toshiyuki Morikawa (Japanese); Xan Cramer (English)
A proud and confident first-class mage of the Order of Magical Resonance, Ashaf is a tall, gentlemanly, chain-smoking man. He is partnered with Guideau, whom he first met three years earlier, and carries the coffin with her real body strapped to his back. Knowledgeable and skilled in many fields of magic, Ashaf primarily fights using magical barriers and summoning animal familiars, particularly crows. Mature and intelligent, Ashaf is perceptive of others and handles the numerous dangers of his job with a cautious, cool-headed approach.
Ashaf is generally caring, sociable, and has a playful sense of humor, but can be pragmatic, dubious, and rather enigmatic in his actions. Despite playfully antagonizing her at times, Ashaf keeps Guideau in line and takes responsibility for her in various ways, including teaching her about the world. While Guideau views Ashaf neutrally as a partner, Ashaf has more ambiguous feelings for Guideau, admitting to caring deeply about her, but hints at a more complex reason to his relationship with her.

=== The Order of Magical Resonance ===
Phanora Kristoffel (ファノーラ・クリストフル, Fanōra Kurisutofuru)
Voiced by: Saori Hayami (Japanese); Katelyn Barr (English)
Known as the "Profound Witch", Phanora specializes in necromancy and is one of the most powerful members of the Order. While typically cold and detached, Phanora has good morals and is caring to those she is close to. Phanora seems to be well-connected to her fellow witches, displaying familiarity with both the Velvette clan and Angela.
Johan (ヨハン, Yohan)
Voiced by: Ryōta Ōsaka (Japanese); Kyle Phillips (English)
A tall, dark-haired man with a patch over his left eye, Johan is Phanora's personal assistant and her partner in the Order. As a "special" undead, Johan possesses an immortal body capable of regenerating without Phanora's magic, as well as superhuman strength, and is a skilled knife-wielding combatant. Laid-back and good-humored, Johan faithfully serves Phanora and handles the "physical labor" aspect of their job.
Helga Velvette (へルガ・ベルベット, Heruga Berubetto)
Voiced by: Miyu Tomita (Japanese); Brittney Karbowski (English)
A young, compassionate witch and a descendant of "Dauntless Witch" Quena Velvette, one of the Origins who sealed the Demon Sword Ashgan. Helga is the sole survivor after the Executioners attacked her clan. She later joins the Order after being saved by Ashaf and Guideau. While understanding how dangerous Ashgan is, Helga has some affection for him, being the first since Quena to have pity for him.
Demon Sword Ashgan (魔剣アシュガン, Maken Ashugan)
Voiced by: Rintarō Nishi (Japanese); Jarrod Greene (English)
Once a demon capable of destroying to the world, Ashgan is sealed in the form of a one-eye talking sword. Currently in possession of Helga Velvette and the Order, who helps Helga maintain the seal on it. While he refuses admit it, Ashgan holds some affection for Helga, who reminds him of Quena.
Falvell Farmington (ハルベル・ハーミントン, Haruberu Hāminton)
Voiced by: Mizuki Mano (Japanese); Kelsey Poppen (English)
A descendant of Luna Farmington, the Origins witch known as the "Mystic Witch". Falvell is mute due to an unknown witch cursing her family line and making them unable to use their vocative magic, which involves casting magic via speech. Despite growing up ostracized, Falvell is a sweet and gentle girl who simply wants a peaceful life.
Owent Farmington (オーエント・ハーミントン, Ōento Hāminton)
Voiced by: Aimi Tanaka (Japanese); Madeleine Morris (English)
Falvell's kind, strong-willed, and mature younger brother, who speaks on her behalf. While a descendant of a witch, Owent has no magical power and prefers to live quietly with his sister. While not members of the Order, Owent and Falvell are under the Order's protection.
Oscar Orlencia (オスカー・オルエンシア)
A descendant of Lionelle Orlencia, the Origins witch known as the "Great Witch" and a user of sun magic. Despite having a feminine appearance, Oscar is a male, making him an oddity since most witches are female. He is Dunward's partner and oversees Level 4 of the "Fall", which is the domain his ancestor created long ago. Sensible and compassionate, Oscar often has to reign in Dunward's selfish and reckless behavior.
Dunward Colvect (ダンウォード・コルヴェクト)
Former king of Orlencia Sett's Gnir faction, Dunward is an immensely arrogant and prideful vampire and Oscar's partner. Dunward seeks to reclaim his throne from Dorenz and save his only surviving daughter from Angela, who is using his child as her current vessel. Due to his potent Gnir blood, Dunward has the ability to transform into a werewolf-like creature during a full moon.
Ganzig (ガンジーク)
A high-ranking member, Ganzig has been part of the Order since he was a young teenager and is a powerful mage.
Oddman (オッドマン)
A middle-aged man tasked to guard the area around Guideau's home, mainly at night.
Lucy O'Brien (ルーシー・オブライエン)
A mage secretly tasked to watch over the Farmington siblings, Lucy befriends the children and becomes a regular customer at their store.

=== The Global Holy Church ===
Matt Cugat (マット・クーガ, Matto Kūga)
Voiced by: Akira Ishida (Japanese); Landon McDonald (English)
A high-ranking commander of the Paladin Corps and a member of the Cugat family, who are famed for being elemental mages. Matt is contracted with a primordial ice elemental, allowing him to manifest and control ice, and is thus one of few people with power to rival witches. Known as the "Man of Ice", Matt has an aloof and serious demeanor, but has integrity, a strong sense of justice, and a noble heart. After losing his battalion to the Executioners, Matt becomes increasingly intertwined with the growing battle between the Holy Church and Angela's coven.
The Executioner (処刑人, Shokei hito)
Voiced by: Kazuhiro Yamaji (Japanese); Bruce Carey (English)
An unnamed member of the Executioners and the one behind the attack on Helga's family to seek the Demon Sword Ashgan. He has the power of mind control through his Demon Hand Ishlingen, a dark magical tool made from the skins of seventeen ancient kings sewn onto it and an enchanted royal ring to increase its power. His partner is his older brother, who is killed by Angela after attempting to look for him after the Demon Sword incident.
Farmus (ファーマス, Fāmasu)
Voiced by: Kōsei Hirota (Japanese); Mark Stoddard (English)
A middle-aged man who works as vice-commander of Matt's battalion in the Paladin Corps. He is killed by the Executioners to serve as a blood sacrifice to Demon Sword Ashgan.
Lowell (ローエル, Rōeru)
Voiced by: Yū Kobayashi (Japanese); Amanda Gael (English)
A ginger-haired woman who works as Matt's assistant in the Paladin Corps. However, she proves to be a traitor, siding with the Executioners against Matt, and is punished for her deeds after the Demon Sword incident.
Karl Oakleave (カール・オクリーヴ)
Voiced by: Satoshi Shibasaki (Japanese); Bryson Baugus (English)
A member of the Executioners, Karl uses the alias "Craig" to spy and hunt the Farmington siblings. Despite looking like a child, Oakleave implies that he is much older. He uses a Forbidden Instrument made from demon remains to summon a monstrous bone-wielding familiar.
Sven (スヴェン)
Voiced by: Daisuke Ono (Japanese); Aaron Roberts (English)
A member of the Executioners and Karl Oakleave's former partner, spending six months undercover together to hunt the Farmington siblings. He is killed by Falvell's vocative magic.
Thurlander (サーランダー)
Director of the Executioners and an invisible man, having lost his physical image due to a spell mishap.
Keith (キース)
A high-ranking commander of the Paladin Corps and friendly colleague of Matt's. He leads the defense of the fort that stores Forbidden Instruments and is killed by members of Angela's coven.
Gil Dellinger (ギル・デリンジャー)
A high-ranking commander of the Paladin Corps who participates in the defense the fort that stores Forbidden Instruments. He is a highly suspicious individual with a notable scar on his cheek.

=== Angela's Coven ===
Angela Anne Huell (アンジェラ = アン・フュール, Anjera An Fuyūru)
Voiced by: Kana Hanazawa (Japanese); Erin Lundquist (English)
One of the Origins witches and the one responsible for Guideau's curse. Known as the "Eternal Witch", she is able to live past 200 years due to her body stealing ability. Cruel and sadistic, Angela views the chase between her and Guideau like a game and uses many different pawns to fulfill her mysterious plans. According to Angela, Guideau's female body is actually Angela's real body.
Stayler Allman
An infamous mage and a witch's disciple that specializes in compression magic. She is the former pupil of two witches and is apparently bestowed with a witch's youthful longevity, allowing her to outlive her mentors.
Lucia Spendrow
A descendant of the "Giant Witch" Viola Spendrow, the Origin witch who controls natural disasters.

=== Supporting characters ===
Misha (ミシャ)
A friendly and cheerful girl, Misha is Guideau's housekeeper and takes care of her daily needs. Although she is the daughter of an Order-affiliated manager, she is not a member herself and isn't privy to hear about the Order's cases.
Ione (イオーネ, Iōne)
Voiced by: Yoko Hikasa (Japanese); Lydia Mackay (English)
A scheming witch who is mistakenly considered a hero and city protector by the townspeople. Ione is currently imprisoned by the Order.
Mary (マリー, Marī)
Voiced by: Noriko Shibasaki (Japanese); Kelly Greenshield (English)
A devoted and kind girl who works as Ione's apprentice.
Kiera Haines (キーラ・ヘインス, Kīra Heinsu)
Voiced by: Junko Minagawa (Japanese); Morgan Lauré (English)
A mage who works as a police officer in Hayden, the capital of Pheres, and the only mage on the force, after the death of Reuben. She works with Ashaf and Guideau to catch the witch responsible for a number of serial killings.
Reuben Cole (ルーベン・コール, Rūben Kōru)
Voiced by: Hidenobu Kiuchi (Japanese); Christopher Wehkamp (English)
Hayden's police detective and Kiera's late boyfriend, as well as her magic teacher. One of the victim of the serial killings in The Witch's Pastime arc.
Shulk (シュルク, Shuruku) and Loran (ロラン, Roran)
Voiced by: Atsushi Kousaka (Japanese); Aaron Michael (English);Voiced by: Takuma Terashima (Japanese); Drew Breedlove (English)
Kiera's adopted twin sons and the culprits of the serial killings in Hayden. Having been corrupted by Forbidden Instruments, they are killed by Kiera.
Jeff Enker (ジェフ・エンカー, Jefu Enkā)
Voiced by: Hozumi Gōda (Japanese); Jeff Plunk (English)
A sergeant in the police force in a certain city with ambivalent feelings towards necromancy. He contacts the Order of Magical Resonance when undead problems occur in the city.
Necromancer (死霊魔術師, Shiryō Majutsushi)
Voiced by: Nozomu Sasaki (Japanese); Barry Yandell (English)
An unauthorized necromancer who resurrects people to find a way to bring back his dead lover. As punishment for his crimes, Phanora turns him into an undead and is forced to maintain the undeads he is responsible for.
Dornez Guywasse (ドルネイズ・ギィワース)
Vampire Queen of the Gnir, she is Dunward's former concubine who overthrew him after Angela bestows her witch power 100 years ago. As part of a deal with Angela, Dorenz provides Angela with bodies to house her soul whenever her current vessel starts breaking down. She is killed by Dunward and Oscar, allowing them to reclaim the Gnir's throne.
The "Bridge" (橋)
Called only by his title, the "Bridge" is Dunward's younger brother and neutral arbiter between the feuding Conglade and the Gnir. While scheming and tricky, he is on relatively good terms with Dunward and juggles different agendas while preserving his neutrality.
The Doll
A human woman cursed by an unknown witch and had her soul trapped in a life-like, human-sized doll. Despite her predicament, the Doll is cheerful and talkative, though her voice is very faint. The Doll's body is imbued with a strong recluse spell, cloaking the area around her from strangers. After Guideau found her at a magical antique shop, she brings the Doll to her home.
The Nameless Seed
A unique Forbidden Instrument that can absorb, mimic, and use the type of magic it consumes. Its current form is of a young human boy and has the potential to be more powerful than a witch. Initially stored by the Paladin Corps, the Order gains custody of the Nameless Seed following the raid at the fort and tries to protect it from Angela's coven.
Joz
A lieutenant of the Vagner Police Force and a mage that specializes in spells that weaponize his environment and uses books with runes to help cast magic.
Marda
A member of the Vagner Police Force and a mage that uses a baseball bat and body modification spells to enhance her physical abilities.

== Media ==
=== Manga ===
The series is written and illustrated by Kousuke Satake, and started serialization in Young Magazine the 3rd on November 6, 2016. Following Young Magazine the 3rd publishing its final issue in April 2021, the series was moved to the new Monthly Young Magazine, starting on May 20. The first tankōbon volume was released on September 20, 2017. As of August 2022, the individual chapters have been collected in 10 tankōbon volumes.

At New York Comic Con 2019, Kodansha USA announced they licensed the series for English publication. As the series is ongoing, the latest serialized chapters are simultaneously published with the Japanese release on Kodansha's K Manga platform.

==== Volumes ====
No.	Original release date	Original ISBN	English release date	English ISBN
1	September 20, 2017	978-4-06-382968-6	October 27, 2020	978-1-64651-021-4
2	December 20, 2017	978-4-06-510306-7	November 24, 2020	978-1-64651-022-1
3	September 20, 2018	978-4-06-512701-8	December 8, 2020	978-1-64651-023-8
4	February 20, 2019	978-4-06-514555-5	February 9, 2021	978-1-64651-024-5
5	September 19, 2019	978-4-06-516935-3	June 22, 2021	978-1-64651-171-6
6	March 18, 2020	978-4-06-519002-9	July 20, 2021	978-1-64651-225-6
7	October 20, 2020	978-4-06-521003-1	November 9, 2021	978-1-64651-237-9
8	April 20, 2021	978-4-06-522941-5	February 8, 2022	978-1-64651-302-4
9	January 20, 2022	978-4-06-526484-3	September 26, 2022	978-1-64651-391-8
10	August 19, 2022	978-4-06-529081-1	February 28, 2023	978-1-64651-607-0

=== Anime ===
In August 2022, it was announced that the series would be receiving an anime adaptation. It was later confirmed to be a television series produced by Yokohama Animation Laboratory and directed by Takayuki Hamana. Yūichirō Momose is writing the scripts, Hiroya Iijima handling the character designs, and Hanae Nakamura and Natsumi Tabuchi composing the music. The series aired from January 12 to April 5, 2024, on TBS, BS11 and other networks. (Note: TBS listed the series premiere at 25:28 on January 11, which is January 12 at 1:28 a.m.) The opening theme song is "Soumonka", performed by Sokoninaru, while the ending theme song is "Hikari no Trill", performed by Yoshino Nanjo. Crunchyroll streamed the series outside of Asia. Plus Media Networks Asia licensed the series in Southeast Asia.

==== Episodes ====
No.	Title (Note: All English titles are taken from Crunchyroll.)	Directed by (Note: Information is taken from the ending credits of each episode.)	Storyboarded by	Original release date
1	"The Witch and the City of Blazing Red"; Transliteration: "Majo to Guren no Machi" (Japanese: 魔女と紅蓮の街)	Takayuki Hamana	Takayuki Hamana	January 12, 2024
Ashaf and Guideau arrive in a town seeking a particular witch, and find a powerful witch who is considered the community's hero and protector. However, the witch plans revenge on the anniversary of her grandmother's death and Ashaf and Guideau try to stop her. After Guideau, in her female form, is unable to defeat the witch, Ashaf unleashes her true form, a towering masked figure which beats the witch into submission.
2	"The Witch's Pastime: Opening Act"; Transliteration: "Majo no Tawamure ―Jomaku―" (Japanese: 魔女の戯れ ―序幕―)	Masahiko Suzuki	Toshiyuki Sone	January 19, 2024
Ashaf and Guideau spend time solving cases involving the misuse of magic, but Guideau is only interested in finding and defeating witches. A witch is committing serial gruesome murders in Hayden, capital of Pheres, possibly using a grimoire, and they are assigned to investigate. They meet with Keira Haines, a mage who is part of the Hayden police, to catch the perpetrator before the international Paladin Corps are called in. Haines agrees to work with them. Meanwhile, the murders continue.
3	"The Witch's Pastime: Final Act"; Transliteration: "Majo no Tawamure ―Shūmaku―" (Japanese: 魔女の戯れ ―終幕―)	Jang Hee-kyu; Shinya Kawabe	Motohiro Abe	January 26, 2024
Following up on phrases left by the witch serial killer, Ashaf, Guideau, and Haines investigate a bookshop, but they find the owner gruesomely murdered. Haines refers to the current murder spree as a "Witch's Pastime" because she believes it's just a game to them. After the witch attacks Ashaf and Guideau, they deduce the witch is somehow linked to Haines. They confront Haines, who admits that the witch killed her children and then her lover, targeting those close to her. The witch stages an attack on the police headquarters, but Ashaf uses his crows to follow the witch to her hideout. They discover that Haines's two adopted sons, Shulk and Loran, are the perpetrator after coming into possession of set of grimoires, Sarnouasuth. Although they claim the grimoire forced them to kill, Haines states they went too far and shoots them both dead. Ashaf takes the grimoire for safekeeping.
4	"Beauty and Death: Opening Act"; Transliteration: "Bi to Shi ―Jomaku―" (Japanese: 美と死 ―序幕―)	Kim Hye-jeong; Shinya Kawabe	Shinji Itadaki	February 2, 2024
Ashaf and Guideau intercept and stop an undead on a rampage, who appears to have not been "maintained" by his necromancer. Ashaf calls in the Order's necromancy specialists, Phanora Kristoffel, accompanied by her servant, Johan. When Sergeant Jeff Enker explains that six undeads have recently gone out of control, Phanora suspects an unauthorized necromancer is responsible. Meanwhile, Phanora has activated a special lantern to attract the undeads, and about forty of them converge on their location. She transfers the light to Johan, attracting the undeads to him so that he becomes their target and he is forced to kill them. Phanora, Johan, and Enker retrace the Undeads' footsteps to a mansion in the forest, where they are confronted by undeads under the necromancer's control, including Enker's dead fiancée. One undead slits Johan's throat, forcing Phanora to enter the building and confront the necromancer to save him.
5	"Beauty and Death: Final Act"; Transliteration: "Bi to Shi ―Shūmaku―" (Japanese: 美と死 ―終幕―)	Masato Tamagawa	Hiroyuki Yoshii	February 9, 2024
Phanora and Enker enter the mansion to be greeted by the necromancer and a number of undead servants. She explains to Enker that the necromancer fundamentally resurrected them to achieve some personal objective, taking them out of the spiral of death and rebirth. By poorly maintaining them, if they die a second time, their souls will fall into the Void with no hope of ever rejoining the spiral. The necromancer explains that he desires Phanora's beautiful body to resurrect the decaying and badly burned corpse of his lover Mireille to restore her former beauty. When Phanora reveals that she is a witch, he brings forth a hoard of "combat model" undeads. Phanora manifests her Death Knights to stop them. The necromancer flees, but is caught and tortured by Johan, who reveals to be an undead. As retribution for his misdeeds, Phanora kills the necromancer, brings him back to life, and then tasks him with eternally maintaining all the undeads he had previously resurrected as complete human beings.
6	"The Witch and the Demon Sword: Opening Act"; Transliteration: "Majo to Maken ―Jomaku―" (Japanese: 魔女と魔剣 ―序幕―)	Takayuki Hamana	Takayuki Hamana	February 16, 2024
Ashaf and Guideau receive an assignment to investigate a series of killings in a city attributed to a witch. Meanwhile, Commander Matt Cugat of the Paladin Corps is assigned to capture the witch thought to be responsible for the killings, Helga Velvette, and is assisted by an emissary from the Holy Church. He sends out the avatars of a team of Seekers from the Corps' castle fortress floating above the city, but Helga destroys them. Ashaf also finds Helga and sends Guideau in to fight her, giving him enough time to cast a compression spell to confine Helga within a small ball. Ashaf recognizes Helga as a descendant of an Origin, the Dauntless Witch, Quena Velvette. Ashaf realizes that Helga is not the murderer, but suspects the real danger is Demon Sword Ashgan she possesses, which has the power to destroy the world. Ashaf offers to protect Helga from the Paladin Corps and the sword itself agrees, but Helga refuses and she is soon confronted by Cugat.
7	"The Witch and the Demon Sword: Act II"; Transliteration: "Majo to Maken ―Dainimaku―" (Japanese: 魔女と魔剣 ―第二幕―)	Kim Hye-jeong; Masahiko Suzuki	Toshiya Niidome	March 1, 2024 (Note: Episode 7 was postponed from its original air date on February 23, 2024.)
Ashaf instructs Guideau to delay Cugat so Helga can escape, but Cugat eventually overwhelms her. He takes Guideau, Helga, and Ashgan into custody, imprisoning both women in magical armor. However, Ashaf intercedes, and suggests to Cugat that Helga was framed for the murders by the Executioners. Meanwhile, the Paladin Corps guards touch the sword, which causes them to fight over it, until they are stopped by a Paladin commander. Guideau breaks free and tries to escape with the sword and Helga, but Helga is pulled back the Holy Church's emissary, who turns out to be an Executioner, and Guideau escapes with the sword and vows to return for her.
8	"The Witch and the Demon Sword: Act III"; Transliteration: "Majo to Maken ―Daisanmaku―" (Japanese: 魔女と魔剣 ―第三幕―)	Kang Seo-ki; Shinya Kawabe	Shinji Itadaki	March 8, 2024
Ashgan tells Guideau that only Helga can break its seal. Guideau finds Ashaf and the wounded Cugat, who is now convinced that Executioners exist and that one has control of the floating castle. The Executioner soon arrives with the Paladin Corps and Helga under his mind control, aiming to possess Ashgan. He forces the Paladin Corps to kill themselves as a sacrifice and commands Helga to attack Guideau and seize the sword. The Executioner then draws Ashgan from its scabbard and stabs Helga, lifting the seal and releasing the demon within it. Believing that he now controls the demon, the Executioner unleashes its destructive power Cugat uses his elemental power to protect Ashaf ad the others. Ashaf encourages Guideau to kiss Helga to unleash Guideau's beast form.
9	"The Witch and the Demon Sword: Final Act"; Transliteration: "Majo to Maken ―Shūmaku―" (Japanese: 魔女と魔剣 ―終幕―)	JOL-chan	Toshiyuki Sone	March 15, 2024
Guideau kisses a reluctant Helga, unleashing Guideau's beast form. Guideau attacks Ashgan while being assisted by Cugat's elemental power. Ashgan proves more powerful than they expected, but Guideau prevails and Ashgan is again imprisoned within the sword. The Executioner and his assistant attempt to rejoin the townspeople, but Guideau incapacitates him. Cugat imprisons the Executioner and his assistant in ice and takes them away to receive their punishment. Ashaf asks Helga to join the Order of Magical Resonance and she agrees, with the promise to repairing Ashgan and helping to keep him sealed.
10	"Origin Witch"; Transliteration: "Kigen no Majo" (Japanese: 起源の魔女)	Oh Eun-soo; Honami Inamura	Shinji Itadaki	March 22, 2024
Helga goes with Ashaf to a magically hidden doorway leading into the headquarters of the Order of Magical Resonance, leaving the still injured Guideau outside with instructions to wait. When Guideau overhears children talking about a witch, she goes with them to a cottage to investigate, but only finds an old woman. An Executioner arrives at the cottage and uses his cloak to take Guideau, the old woman, and children to another dimension. Suddenly, Angela Anne Huell, the powerful Origin witch who cursed Guideau, arrives. Angela takes the Executioner's cloak, kills him, and challenges Guideau to follow her. Later, Guideau is furious that Ashaf intentionally left her in a weakened state and she attacks him, cracking his ribs. He apologizes and promises to protect her, reminiscing how it has been three years since they first met.
11	"Eloquence and Silence: Opening Act"; Transliteration: "Yūben to Chinmoku ―Jomaku―" (Japanese: 雄弁と沈黙 ―序幕―)	Masahiko Suzuki	Shinji Itadaki	March 29, 2024
Three years earlier, Ashaf travels to the Fifth Continent, far from the Global Holy Church's headquarters on the First Continent and relatively untouched by magic. He investigates rumors that a witch is dismembering cattle, which falls from the sky. He encounters the young mute witch, Falvell Farmington, a descendant of the "Mystic Witch", Luna Farmington. While meeting Falvell, her brother Ownet, and their friend Craig, Guideau attacks them until a dark monstrous figure appears and easily casts her aside. While talking to the children, Ashaf learns of Guideau's curse and that Falvell is also cursed that prevents her from casting her vocative magic. After offering the Farmington siblings to join the Order, Ashaf learns that the mayor is attacked and killed by the monster, causing the townsfolk to believe Falvell is responsible. He then realizes that the Executioners are in town and deduces Craig is one of them. Meanwhile, the other Executioner leads a group of villagers towards Falvell's cottage.
12	"Eloquence and Silence: Final Act"; Transliteration: "Yūben to Chinmoku ―Shūmaku―" (Japanese: 雄弁と沈黙 ―終幕―)	JOL-chan	Takayuki Hamana	April 5, 2024 (Note: This episode aired at 1:58 a.m. JST, 30 minutes after the original air time on TBS.)
As the Executioner and villagers arrive at Falvell's cottage and set it ablaze, Guideau presses Ashaf for information to lift the curse on her, who agrees to tell her if she saves Falvell. Falvell arrives home and finds Owent dead and is confronted by an Executioner, a man she trusted as a neighbor. Guideau arrives and saves Falvell, but is badly injured by Craig. Ashaf's crows deliver him to the scene and delays the Executioners long enough for Guideau to kiss Falvell. The kiss lifts the curses on both of them and they were able to defeat the Executioners. Falvell restarts Owent's heart and brings him back to life. With the siblings in tow, Ashaf offers Guideau to join the Order in exchange for aid for her mission. Back in the present, Ashaf tells Guideau how she has slowly changed since they first met and that he wants to teach her about love. Sometime later, Ashaf and Guideau travel to the "Fall", following the clue Angela left. They descend to Level 4, Orlencia Sett, where vampires dwell.

== Reception ==
As part of Anime News Network's Fall 2021 manga guide, Rebecca Silverman and Caitlin Moore reviewed the first volume for the website. They both praised the art and concept, whilst also being critical of how the concept of the series is executed. Sarah from Anime UK News also praised the artwork, while criticizing the characters. Contrary to other critics, Che Gilson from Otaku USA praised the plot and setting in addition to the artwork.

The series has over 500,000 copies in circulation.
