= Orange (manga) =

Japanese manga and anime series

- Cover of Shueisha's first volume of the series
- Genre: Romance; Science fiction Melodrama
- Manga
- Written by: Ichigo Takano
- Published by: Shueisha; Futabasha
- English publisher: NA: Crunchyroll (digital); Seven Seas Entertainment
- Imprint: Margaret Comics; Action Comics
- Magazine: Bessatsu Margaret → Monthly Action
- English magazine: Crunchyroll Manga
- Original run: March 13, 2012 – April 12, 2022
- Volumes: 7
- Novel series
- Written by: Ichigo Takano
- Published by: Futabasha
- Imprint: Junior Bunko
- Original run: July 18, 2015 – March 18, 2016
- Volumes: 3
- Manga

Sorigerisu
- Written by: Matsupon
- Published by: Futabasha
- Magazine: Monthly Action
- Original run: March 25, 2016 – present
- Anime television series
- Directed by: Hiroshi Hamasaki; Naomi Nakayama (#2–13) (assistant)
- Produced by: Ikumi Hayashi; Takashi Yoshizawa
- Written by: Yūko Kakihara
- Music by: Hiroaki Tsutsumi
- Studio: Telecom Animation Film (animation); TMS Entertainment (production)
- Licensed by: Crunchyroll (formerly)
- Original network: Tokyo MX, AT-X, BS11, TVA, ABC, TSB
- Original run: July 3, 2016 – September 25, 2016
- Episodes: 13
- Anime film

Orange: Future
- Directed by: Naomi Nakayama (chief); Hiroshi Hamasaki
- Produced by: Ikumi Hayashi; Takashi Yoshizawa
- Written by: Yūko Kakihara
- Music by: Hiroaki Tsutsumi
- Studio: Telecom Animation Film (animation); TMS Entertainment (production)
- Released: November 18, 2016
- Runtime: 62 minutes
- Live action film
- Orange (2015 film)

Orange (stylized in lowercase) is a Japanese science fiction manga written and illustrated by Ichigo Takano, aimed at both shōjo and seinen demographics. The series follows high schoolgirl Naho Takamiya, who receives a letter written by herself ten years in the future. She is tasked with keeping an eye on Kakeru Naruse, a transfer student whose mother committed suicide on his first day of school. It was first serialized in 2012 in Bessatsu Margaret manga magazine and later in Monthly Action.

Orange has been compiled into seven volumes as of April 2022. A live action film adaptation of the same name was released on December 12, 2015. An anime television adaptation started to air in July 2016. A spin-off to the manga began serialization on March 25, 2016, in the Monthly Action magazine published by Futabasha. An anime theatrical film, titled Orange: Future, premiered in Japan on November 18, 2016.

== Plot ==
In Matsumoto, Nagano, Naho Takamiya, a second-year high school student, receives letters sent from herself 10 years into the future. Her future self asks her to prevent her "biggest regrets", which has something to do with the new transfer student from Tokyo, a boy named Kakeru Naruse. At first skeptical, Naho begins to believe the letters as they accurately predict events. When the letter asks her not to invite Kakeru to go out for the first day, Naho and her friends (Hiroto Suwa, Takako Chino, Saku Hagita and Azusa Murasaka) decide to invite him anyway. Kakeru ends up not attending school for the next two weeks.

To prevent another mistake, Naho resolves to do what the letters order her to do, such as volunteering on a softball round, encouraging Kakeru to join the soccer team, objecting to him pursuing a relationship with an upperclassman, and insisting they watch the fireworks alone. Naho learns from the letters in the future Kakeru is dead, having committed suicide one day after Valentine's Day in the same school year in which he enrolled.

During the Bon Festival, Kakeru explains to Naho the reason for his absence: his mother died by suicide because of a mental breakdown caused by him leaving her for friends, and not taking her to the hospital on the day of enrollment as he promised. This causes Naho to also feel guilty, as she feels they share responsibility for Kakeru's mother's death. Later on, Suwa tells Naho he has also received letters from his future self, asking him to be a good friend to Kakeru and save him from his death. Suwa hides the fact he and Naho are married and have a child in the future, as he realizes Naho and Kakeru are in love. Although he has feelings for Naho, his future self realizes by saving Kakeru, he is giving up a future with Naho. Because he knows of their feelings, he listens to the letters and supports them as much as possible. Later, Azusa, and Hagita, and Chino admitted they have received similar letters. They all agree though they may not be able to change the fate of their future selves, they may create a parallel universe where Kakeru is still alive.

To cheer up Kakeru, the five friends organize a celebration for his seventeenth birthday, in which Kakeru confesses his feelings to a surprised Naho. The five also join the relay race team to back Kakeru. With his friends' encouragement, Kakeru wins the race. As his reward for winning the race, Kakeru kisses Naho. However, on New Year's Eve, Naho and Kakeru argue over the latter's grandmother's health. The two become distant over the following weeks, up until the day Kakeru is supposed to die by suicide, as Naho manages to confess her feelings as well as telling Kakeru to share his plan for suicide.

On the night of Kakeru's supposed death, the friends' plan to meet up is interrupted as Kakeru does not arrive on time. The five search throughout Matsumoto and manage to stop him from getting hit by a truck. Kakeru apologizes, telling them he had been thinking of suicide, but at the last second decided not to after realizing it would mean he would never see his friends again.

== Characters ==
Naho Takamiya (高宮 菜穂, Takamiya Naho)
Voiced by: Kana Hanazawa (Japanese); Jill Harris (English)
Portrayed by: Tao Tsuchiya
Naho is a high schoolgirl who receives a letter written by herself ten years in the future, informing herself that she must keep an eye on Kakeru. She ignores the letter at first, but she decides to listen to her letter when it accurately describes the events of each day. She and Kakeru have romantic feelings toward one another. Although unaware of each other's feelings at first, due to her future selves' regrets about not informing him of her true feelings, she informs him of her feelings, and they are able to start dating.
Kakeru Naruse (成瀬 翔, Naruse Kakeru)
Voiced by: Seiichirō Yamashita, Akane Fujita (young) (Japanese); Micah Solusod, Rachel Glass (young) (English)
Portrayed by: Kento Yamazaki
A transfer student from Tokyo. On the first day of classes, he was supposed to take his mother to the hospital, but he ditched her when he was invited to hang out with Naho and her friends. His mother texted him that day asking where he was, but he replied that she was bothersome for asking. Due to a mental breakdown, his mother committed suicide. Blaming himself for his mother's suicide, Kakeru falls into deep depression for a while, and eventually commits suicide while making everyone think it was an accident. In the current future, he and Naho start dating, and his friends prevent his suicide.
Hiroto Suwa (須和 弘人, Suwa Hiroto)
Voiced by: Makoto Furukawa (Japanese); Jason Liebrecht (English)
Portrayed by: Ryo Ryusei
Hiroto is Naho's friend who is in love with her. Despite knowing that Naho and Kakeru loved each other, Suwa marries Naho ten years after Kakeru's death, and they have a baby boy together. After watching Naho's sad face, Suwa realizes that Naho still has feelings for Kakeru, acknowledging that Naho would have been with Kakeru if he had not committed suicide. He writes a letter to his past self and asks himself to help prevent Kakeru's suicide, and to be encouraging of Naho and Kakeru's happiness together, even if it means he does not have a future with her if Kakeru remains alive.
Takako Chino (茅野 貴子, Chino Takako)
Voiced by: Rika Kinugawa (Japanese); Jeannie Tirado (English)
Portrayed by: Hirona Yamazaki
Takako is Naho's friend who received a letter from her future self. She and Azusa are best friends. They speculate that Naho and Suwa are hiding the fact that they have letters from their future selves, only to reveal that they also received letters from their future selves when Naho and Suwa come clean. She and Azusa support both Kakeru and Suwa when it comes to Naho.
Saku Hagita (萩田 朔, Hagita Saku)
Voiced by: Kazuyuki Okitsu (Japanese); Dave Trosko (English)
Portrayed by: Dori Sakurada
Saku is Naho's friend who likes reading manga. He received a letter from himself and helps Kakeru. He likes Azusa but denies it.
Azusa Murasaka (村坂 あずさ, Murasaka Azusa)
Voiced by: Natsumi Takamori (Japanese); Sarah Wiedenheft (English)
Portrayed by: Kurumi Shimizu
Azusa is Naho's friend who received a letter from her future self and helps the group keep Kakeru from dying. She teases Hagita about them being a couple and harasses him, to which he denies he likes her.
Rio Ueda (上田 莉緒, Ueda Rio)
Voiced by: Ayane Sakura (Japanese); Tia Ballard (English)
Portrayed by: Erina Mano
Rio is a girl who usually watches Kakeru's soccer matches and is interested in him. She started dating Kakeru after they confessed to each other, leaving Naho devastated. After her breakup with him, Rio bullies Naho but is constantly confronted by Naho's friends.

== Media ==
=== Manga ===
The original manga is written and illustrated by Ichigo Takano, and originally began serialization on March 13, 2012, in Shueisha's Bessatsu Margaret. However, it switched to Futabasha's Monthly Action in 2013.

The first tankōbon was released by Shueisha on July 25, 2012, who published two volumes of the series. The first two volumes were later republished by Futabasha on December 25, 2013. The manga ended serialization on August 25, 2015, and the fifth volume was published on November 12, 2015. The sixth volume consists of chapters based on the Orange: Future film and the Orange: Suwa Hiroto two-part spin-off manga, and was released on May 31, 2017. It was also announced in that volume that the series would get a seventh volume, and that the seventh volume would be the final volume. The manga is licensed in English in North America by Seven Seas Entertainment, who published the series in two omnibus volumes. Crunchyroll Manga simultaneously published the series on their website.

A spin-off manga began serialization in Monthly Action on March 25, 2016.

No.	Original release date	Original ISBN	English release date	English ISBN
1	July 25, 2012 (Shueisha); December 25, 2013 (Futabasha)	978-4-08-846804-4 (Shueisha); 978-4-575-84323-1 (Futabasha)	January 26, 2016	978-1-626923-02-7
2	November 22, 2012 (Shueisha); December 25, 2013 (Futabasha)	978-4-08-846861-7 (Shueisha); 978-4-575-84324-8 (Futabasha)	January 26, 2016	978-1-626923-02-7
3	August 22, 2014	978-4-575-84470-2	January 26, 2016	978-1-626923-02-7
4	February 20, 2015	978-4-575-84575-4	May 31, 2016	978-1-626922-71-6
5	November 12, 2015	978-4-575-84709-3	May 31, 2016	978-1-626922-71-6
6	May 31, 2017	978-4-575-84987-5	February 6, 2018	978-1-626927-79-7
7	April 12, 2022	978-4-575-85705-4	March 7, 2023	978-1-68579-454-5

=== Live action ===
A live-action film adaptation was released on December 12, 2015, in Japan with Tao Tsuchiya and Kento Yamazaki being the main characters. It was directed by Kojiro Hashimoto and written by Arisa Kaneko.

=== Anime ===
The anime adaptation of Orange is produced by Telecom Animation Film and directed by Hiroshi Hamasaki and Naomi Nakayama, with Yūko Kakihara handling series scripts, Nobuteru Yūki designing the characters and Hiroaki Tsutsumi composing the music. The series premiered on July 4, 2016, on Tokyo MX and AT-X. The series was simulcast on Crunchyroll outside of Asia, while Funimation produced an English dub as the series aired. The series was removed from Crunchyroll on July 23, 2026. The opening theme song is "Hikari no Hahen" (光の破片; Fragment of Light) by Yu Takahashi while the ending theme song is "Mirai" (未来; Future) by Kobukuro, the latter of which also served as the main theme song for the live-action film and anime.

==== Episode list ====
No.	Title	Directed by	Written by	Storyboarded by	Chief animation directed by	Original air date	Ref.
1	"LETTER 01"	Kazuhiro Ozawa	Yūko Kakihara	Hiroshi Hamasaki	Nobuteru Yūki	July 4, 2016	
While running late for her first day as a high school sophomore, Naho Takamiya sees a mysterious letter written by herself ten years in the future. A transfer student named Kakeru Naruse sits next to Naho in class. Naho and Kakeru are invited to walk home with Naho's friends named Hiroto Suwa, Takako Chino, Saku Hagita and Azusa Murasaka. After they all eat Azusa's family bakery buns, Kakeru hangs out with Naho and her friends in the afternoon. Kakeru is then absent from school for two weeks. When Kakeru returns, he jokingly tells Naho that he was just ditching. Naho's right foot becomes injured due to her shoe size being too small. During a softball tournament, Naho is advised by her letter to accept an offer to be a pinch hitter in order to avoid regret. This allows the girls softball club to win the tournament. Afterwards, Naho's blistered right foot is treated by Kakeru, and she falls in love with him. According to her letter, Naho must keep a close eye on Kakeru, who may not be alive in ten years. Ten years later, Naho and Suwa are married and have a baby boy named Matsumoto.
2	"LETTER 02"	Takayuki Kuriyama	Yūko Kakihara	Naomi Nakayama	Katsu Kitao	July 11, 2016	
Kakeru shockingly never brings a packed lunch to school. After Naho sews on a button that fell off of Suwa's school uniform, Suwa invites Kakeru to become a provisional member of the boys soccer club. Naho spends the evening at her house preparing two packed lunches. The next day, Naho does not have the courage to give Kakeru a packed lunch during her morning classes. After school, Kakeru notices that Naho's lunch bag seems bigger than usual, but Naho shies away from him. When Kakeru and Suwa finish soccer practice, Naho finds them and apologizes to Kakeru for her abrupt dismissal. As Suwa leaves school on his bike, Naho and Kakeru walk home together. After Kakeru becomes curious about her hobbies and interests, Naho asks him why he was absent from school for two weeks. Kakeru reveals that he had to move after attending the funeral of his late mother, who committed suicide on his first day of school. Naho finally gives Kakeru the packed lunch, making Kakeru happy. She is determined to keep him smiling everyday. Her letter reveals that Kakeru died in a supposed future accident. Ten years later, Naho and her friends prepare to visit Kakeru's grave.
3	"LETTER 03"	Taku Yamada	Mariko Kunisawa	Minoru Ohara	Katsu Kitao	July 18, 2016	
Naho learns from Suwa that Kakeru will become an official member of the boys soccer club. Despite her letter saying otherwise, Naho realizes that the future is not set in stone. After early morning soccer practice, Naho and Kakeru deny having crushes for other people. During a half-day at school, Kakeru retrieves beverages from the vending machine for Nano and her friends, in which Naho chooses orange juice. Just as Naho's letter predicts, Rio Ueda, a girl who watches Kakeru during soccer practice, confesses her feelings to Kakeru. Naho later lends Kakeru a pencil and an eraser during class. After class, Naho opens her eraser cover, which contains a note written by Kakeru, asking her permission for him to date Ueda. Although Naho replies with the negative on another note and leaves it inside Kakeru's getabako, Kakeru sees Naho's note too late after having already agreed to date Ueda. An upset Naho returns home and drinks the orange juice. Ten years later, Naho and her friends read a letter from Kakeru's time capsule, as it is noticed that Kakeru wrote to everyone else except his future self.
4	"LETTER 04"	Takanori Yano	Ayumu Hisao	Takashi Sano	Katsu Kitao; Minoko Takasu	July 25, 2016	
Ten years later, Naho and her friends visit Kakeru's grandmother, whom Kakeru used to lived with after his late mother's suicide. Back ten years ago, Naho and her friends hang out at the mall together during a school break. As Kakeru and Ueda begin dating after the school break, Naho loses all chances to talk to Kakeru. Advised by the letter, Naho has to start talking to Kakeru again, though this seems impossible with Ueda always lingering nearby. Four days later, Naho tries to call out to a sombre Kakeru, but Naho falls down when Ueda accidentally bumps into her. As Kakeru rushes to lend a hand to Naho, an envious Ueda storms out in tears. Feeling at fault, Naho runs away, only to be stopped by Suwa, who encourages her to talk to Kakeru. Naho rushes off to talk things out with Kakeru, while Takako and Azusa wonder what Naho may be hiding from her friends. At an outdoor bench, Kakeru confides in Naho that he will break up with Ueda because he may be in love with someone else.
5	"LETTER 05"	Nobukage Kimura	Yūko Kakihara	Nobukage Kimura	Katsu Kitao; Minoko Takasu	August 1, 2016	
On a rainy morning, Kakeru comes to school soaking wet because he forgot his umbrella, and Naho lends him a bath towel instead of a handkerchief as advised by her letter. When the sky clears up in the afternoon after school, Kakeru takes Naho to a park. Kakeru gives Naho a hairpin as gratitude for all the packed lunches. He then invites her to study chemistry with him during the weekend at the library. After Kakeru aces the chemistry test, chemistry teacher Nakano lectures about the concept of time travel applied to the many-worlds interpretation. Naho notices that her letter has not changed despite her decisions to alter the future. Naho takes the initiative and invites Kakeru to watch the fireworks at the end of the upcoming cultural festival with her. Until recently, Naho was oblivious to the fact that Suwa may have feelings for her, something Kakeru, Takako, Hagita and Azusa already knew about. During the cultural festival, Naho is eventually confronted by Ueda, who harasses Naho to hand over her hairpin. Suwa intervenes and saves Naho, whose right hand is later bandaged by Kakeru. Naho's letter notes that Suwa is the dear person who saved her heart.
6	"LETTER 06"	Taku Yamada	Mariko Kunisawa	Kazuhiro Ozawa	Katsu Kitao; Minoko Takasu	August 8, 2016	
Kakeru asks Naho to meet him at the swimming pool in order to watch the fireworks together. On the way there, Naho is badgered by Ueda into carrying two heavy packets to the homeroom. Near the swimming pool, Suwa and Hagita tell Ueda that Kakeru is waiting for her in the boys soccer clubroom. When the fireworks start bursting in the sky, Takako and Azusa take care of the packets, while Naho rushes to the swimming pool. Naho and Kakeru hold hands while happily watching the fireworks together. Naho's letter mentions that Kakeru never died in an accident, but instead committed suicide. Ten years later, Kakeru's grandmother shows Naho and her friends a letter written by Kakeru, who wanted everyone to believe that his suicide was an accident. Back ten years ago, Naho and Kakeru meet up at the Bon festival, while Suwa, Takako, Hagita and Azusa pretend to arrive late. After visiting a shrine, Kakeru opens up to Naho, revealing that his chronically ill mother committed suicide back on his first day of school. At her house, Naho is upset when Kakeru stops contacting her. Suwa visits Naho and inquires about her letter.
7	"LETTER 07"	Toshihiro Kikuchi	Ayumu Hisao	Toshihiro Kikuchi	Katsu Kitao; Minoko Takasu	August 15, 2016	
Naho learns that Suwa also received a letter written by himself ten years in the future. Once confirming at school the next day that Kakeru has an upcoming birthday, Naho and her friends plan to celebrate it together. Ten years later, Naho and her friends gather around Kakeru's memorial. Suwa gives a flower bouquet to Naho, telling her that Kakeru had always been in love with her. Back ten years ago, Takako, Azusa, Hagita, Naho and Suwa respectively give soccer tickets, a manga, a lunch bag and a flower bouquet as presents to Kakeru, who then gives Suwa's flower bouquet to Naho and confesses his feelings for her. Naho and Suwa shockingly learn from their letters that Kakeru will attempt suicide nine days after his birthday. Kakeru blames himself for his mother's death when he brushed off her messages to take her to the hospital while he spent the afternoon with Naho and her friends on the first day of school. After Kakeru admits to having suicidal thoughts, Kakeru is embraced by Suwa, who encourages him to let go of his guilt and regret. Naho then candidly confesses her feelings for him.
8	"LETTER 08"	Ryūta Kawahara; Takahiko Kyōgoku	Yūko Kakihara	Takahiko Kyōgoku	Katsu Kitao; Minoko Takasu	August 22, 2016	
Kakeru faints during soccer practice, prompting Naho and her friends to watch over him in the infirmary before his grandmother picks him up. Naho and Suwa later discuss how their letters did not specify that Kakeru would faint during soccer practice. The next day, Kakeru is chosen as the anchor leg for the upcoming relay race. Eventually, Naho and her friends all volunteer to participate in the relay race with Kakeru. In their bedrooms, Naho and Suwa talk on the phone, discussing their decision to stop relying on their letters. On two different occasions after school, Naho and Kakeru walk towards the school entrance, where Kakeru stretches out his hand. Naho is left confused as Kakeru apologetically walks away. Suwa, Takako, Hagita and Azusa later explain to Naho that Kakeru simply wanted to hold hands with Naho. Urged by Suwa, Naho mentions to her friends that she received a letter written by herself ten years in the future. Takako, Azusa and even Hagita surprisingly also received letters written by themselves ten years in the future. This means that all five of them have the same exact goal of saving Kakeru.
9	"LETTER 09"	Hideki Tonokatsu; Telecom Direction Department	Mariko Kunisawa	Keiichiro Kawaguchi	Katsu Kitao; Minoko Takasu	August 29, 2016	
With a renewed support from her friends to save Kakeru, Naho makes a more conscious effort to improve her relationship with him. Based on Azusa's letter, her upcoming birthday calls for a rainy afternoon despite a sunny morning. Using this to their advantage, Naho, Suwa, Takako, Hagita and Azusa all bring their umbrellas, as to which Naho shares hers with Kakeru. While Suwa, Takako, Hagita and Azusa hang out at a diner, Naho and Kakeru seek shelter at a park, where Naho finally finds the courage to hold hands with Kakeru. Nine days later, Naho starts relying on her letter again, learning that Kakeru does not enjoy the athletic meet. As family members come to support Naho, Suwa, Takako, Hagita and Azusa, Suwa's parents surprisingly bring Kakeru's grandmother to the athletic meet. After the tug of war event, Kakeru begins to think about his mother. Because he might move again sooner or later, Kakeru says that he does not mind if Suwa dated Naho. After the pole toppling event, Suwa is treated for his cuts by Naho at the first-aid station. A jealous Kakeru abruptly leaves without being treated for his cuts, musing on what he previously said to Suwa.
10	"LETTER 10"	Takanori Yano	Ayumu Hisao	Takashi Sano	Katsu Kitao; Minoko Takasu	September 4, 2016	
After the cheer battle event, Hagita informs Suwa, Takako and Azusa that Kakeru may have sprained his ankle during the pole toppling event. Meanwhile, Naho and Kakeru carry a heavy mat as an errand. Suwa, Takako, Hagita and Azusa arrive to help Naho and Kakeru carry the heavy mat. Finally accepting support from the others, Kakeru comes clean about his late mother committing suicide, which heavily weighs on his conscience. The others believe that his late mother would have rather seen him have fun. After Kakeru has his ankle bandaged up, he feels ready to participate in the relay race. During the relay race, Suwa, Takako, Azusa, Hagita and Naho each pass the baton ending with Kakeru as the anchor leg. Kakeru receives the message that the others will always be there for him. This gives Kakeru the motivation to finish in first place and lead his team to victory, contrary to what the letters told the others. After the athletic meet, Naho concludes that her letter is neither always right nor always wrong. After Naho treats a scrape on Kakeru's arm, Kakeru kisses Naho on the cheek as his reward for winning the relay race.
11	"LETTER 11"	Hideki Tonokatsu	Mariko Kunisawa	Kō Matsuo	Katsu Kitao	September 11, 2016	
Ten years later, Naho and her friends discuss what would have happened if Kakeru was still alive. Suwa feels the most regret because he knew how both Naho and Kakeru felt about each other. Back ten years ago, a shrine visit is planned for New Year's Eve later during the month. As Naho and Kakeru run off to get taiyaki together, Takako confronts Suwa for declining the shrine visit. Suwa does not want to confess his feelings to Naho, recalling that the future will remain the same regardless of his decisions. On New Year's Eve, Suwa stays home while the others visit the shrine. While getting beverages from the vending machine, Kakeru asks Naho if he can go home to check on his sick grandmother. Naho assures Kakeru that his grandmother is fine, but this erupts into a fight since Kakeru does not want his grandmother to end up like his mother. Having been scolded by Takako, Hagita and Azusa, Suwa meets up with Naho to console her without confessing his feelings to her. As the clock strikes midnight, Kakeru smashes his cellphone on the ground when Naho tries to contact him.
12	"LETTER 12"	Nobuo Tomizawa; Takahiro Tamano	Ayumu Hisao	Kō Matsuo	TBA	September 18, 2016	
In the past, Kakeru and his mother first moved from Tokyo to Matsumoto after his parents divorced. Kakeru fell into deep depression after his late mother's suicide, but he avoided telling Naho and her friends about this. He will end up committing suicide by riding his bike towards an oncoming truck at an intersection late at night after discovering that his late mother saved an apologetic drafted message for him on her cellphone detailing that she chose to divorce his violent father. In the present, a rift widens between Naho and Kakeru at school, even when she tries to apologize for being insensitive towards him on New Year's Eve. Ten years later, Naho and her friends meet up at a field of cherry blossoms. After Hagita informs the others that a Swiss researcher discovered a black hole in the Bermuda Triangle, they collectively decide to send letters to themselves ten years in the past. Back ten years ago, Naho urges Kakeru to wait until Valentine's Day. Regardless if she gets hurt or he hates her, she is still determined that she will not lose him.
13	"LAST LETTER"	Keiko Oyamada; Yūichirō Yano	Yūko Kakihara	Hiroshi Hamasaki; Takashi Sano; Naomi Nakayama	TBA	September 25, 2016	
On Valentine's Day, Naho bakes a box of chocolates, but she struggles to deliver them to Kakeru. After missing three chances to deliver the box of chocolates at school, her fourth and final chance is ruined when she drops the box of chocolates after bumping into Ueda and it is consequently stepped on. With an unwavering resolve, Naho meets with Kakeru by his getabako, where she confronts him for avoiding her. Although he felt like he hurt her on New Year's Eve, she says otherwise and apologizes again to him. He admits that he was keeping his distance in order to avoid hurting her. She expresses a desire to date him in order to keep him happy, even if something would possibly go wrong. After they embrace, Kakeru asks Naho to give him the box of chocolates that was behind her back, while Suwa, Takako, Hagita and Azusa cheer from the sidelines. The next day, Naho offers to walk home with Kakeru, but he declines because he has to take his grandmother to the hospital. Naho's letter specifies that Kakeru will die that evening. Ten years later, Hagita tells the others that the past in their world cannot be changed due to a time paradox, but it is still possible to do so in a parallel world. Back ten years ago, Kakeru looks at his late mother's cellphone. Naho and her friends search for Kakeru when he runs outside. He walks in front of an oncoming truck, but he jumps out of the way at the last moment, reconsidering the support system that he has. Naho and her friends find Kakeru, revealing to him the letters that their future selves wrote to them as well as to him. After they all embrace and reconcile, it is revealed that Hagita vandalized Kakeru's bike. The following day, Kakeru adds his own letter in the time capsule before it is buried with the letters of the others.

=== Film ===
An anime theatrical film, titled Orange: Mirai (オレンジ -未来-, Orenji: Mirai; Orange: Future), was announced at the end of the anime television series' final episode. The film will retell the series' main story from Suwa's viewpoint, and will also feature an original story written by Takano which is set after the anime and manga series. It scheduled for a two-week premiere in Japanese theaters that premiered on November 18, 2016.

== Reception ==
Volume 1 reached the 30th place on the weekly Oricon manga chart and, as of July 29, 2012, has sold 31,451 copies; volume 2 reached the 31st place and, as of December 2, 2012, has sold 68,977 copies; volume 3 reached the 20th place and, as of September 7, 2014, has sold 111,934 copies.

On manga-news.com, Orange has a staff grade of 17.5 out of 20, volume 1 was chosen by the staff as one of the top manga of the week as a "new [release] crush" and volume 2 was also chosen as one of the top manga of the week. On planetebd.com, it has a staff grade of "good, nice". It was number 23 on the 15th Book of the Year list by Da Vinci magazine. The series ranked twelfth in the first Next Manga Award in the print manga category.

The English release was reviewed well by Rebecca Silverman of Anime News Network, who gave both omnibus collections an overall A− score. She praised the "poignant and moving" story, but warned the issue of suicide may make it a difficult read for some people. Eva de Gans of Dutch magazine Aniway recommended the series, praising its visuals and "endearing and relatable" cast of characters, while criticizing Naho and Kakeru's characterizations as passive, timid characters and the "unconvincing" explanation of the time travel.

The series was nominated for the 2017 Eisner Award in the "Best U.S. Edition of International Material—Asia" category. The series has also been nominated for the 2024 Eisner Award in the "Best Graphic Album – Reprint".

The second omnibus volume ranked first on The New York Times Best Seller list for manga on June 19, 2016, where it remained on the list for four weeks.

== See also ==
- Dreamin' Sun, another series by the same author
