= Zuiryū-ji =

Zuiryū-ji (瑞龍寺) is the name of several Buddhist temples in Japan:

- Zuiryū-ji (Toyama), a Sōtō sect temple in Takaoka, Toyama Prefecture
- Zuiryū-ji (Gifu), a Rinzai sect temple in Gifu, Gifu Prefecture
