= Monthly Action =

Japanese manga magazine

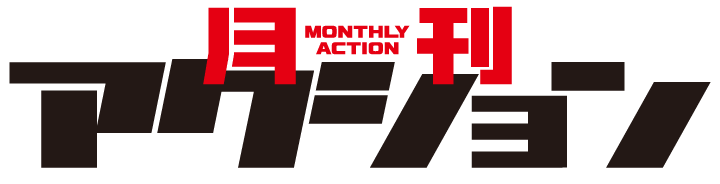

- April 2018 issue, featuring My Brother's Husband
- Categories: Seinen manga
- Frequency: Monthly
- Publisher: Futabasha
- First issue: May 23, 2013; 13 years ago
- Final issue: February 24, 2024
- Country: Japan
- Website: webaction.jp/monthly_action/

Monthly Action (Japanese: 月刊アクション, Hepburn: Gekkan Akushon) was a Japanese seinen manga magazine published by Futabasha from 2013 to 2024.

== History ==
Monthly Action was launched on May 25, 2013, the anniversary of publisher Futabasha's founding. The magazine was formed from a merging of the editorial departments of the manga magazines Manga Action, Comic High!, and Manga Town. While typically categorized as seinen magazine (manga for young adult men), the magazine follows a philosophy of publishing "anything interesting", and does not strictly conform to a specific genre or target demographic. The magazine launched with Action Kamen, a series based on a fictional in-universe super hero from the manga series Crayon Shin-chan.

The magazine ended its publication on February 24, 2024, with its current series transferred to other magazines. Miss Kobayashi's Dragon Maid, Tsugumomo, Sword of the Demon Hunter: Kijin Gentōshō, Wazato Miseteru? Kamoi-san, and Kawasemi-san no Tsuri Gohan moved to sister magazine Manga Action. Other series, including the four Miss Kobayashi's Dragon Maid spinoff manga, were all transferred to the Web Action manga website. Hina no Mama ja Dame Desu ka? and Seiten no Ordo - Talc Teikoku Kōkyī Hishi manga both published their final chapters in the issue.

== Serializations ==
- Holmes of Kyoto by Mai Mochizuki & Yamōchishizu (2015–2024)
- Miss Kobayashi's Dragon Maid by Coolkyousinnjya (2013–2024)
- Peter Grill and the Philosopher's Time by Daisuke Hiyama (2017–2024)
- Seishōnen Ashibe by Hiromi Morishita & Shouhei (2018–2024)
- Higurashi no Naku Koro ni Oni by Ryukishi07 & Asahi (2022–2024)
- Shikizakura by Hayato Aoki (2020–2022)
- Tsugumomo by Yoshikazu Hamada (2013–2024)
- Uchi no Maid ga Uzasugiru! by Kanko Nakamura (2016–2023)
- Crossing Time by Yoshimi Sato (2016–2021)
- Dreamin' Sun by Ichigo Takano (2015–2017)
- Hana & Hina After School by Milk Morinaga (2015–2016)
- I Had That Same Dream Again by Izumi Kirihara (2017–2018)
- I Want to Eat Your Pancreas by Izumi Kirihara (2016–2017)
- My Brother's Husband by Gengoroh Tagame (2014–2017)
- Nobunaga Teacher's Young Bride by Azure Konno (2017–2019)
- Orange by Ichigo Takano (2013–2017)
- Our Colors by Gengoroh Tagame (2018–2020)
- Over Drive Girl 1/6 by Öyster (2012–2015)
- Shōnen Ashibe Go! Go! Goma-chan by Hiromi Morishita and Ogino Junko (2016–2017)
