= List of Hitohira episodes =

The cover of the first DVD compilation released by Media Factory.

Hitohira (ひとひら; lit. Petal) is a Japanese animated television series. The episodes are directed by Akira Nishimori and produced by the Japanese animation studio XEBEC M2 and Genco. They are based on the Hitohira manga by Izumi Kirihara, and adapt the source material over twelve episodes. The episodes aired from March 28, 2007, to June 13, 2007, on AT-X, Chiba TV, Sun TV, TV Aichi, TV Kanagawa and TV Saitama.

Two pieces of theme music are used for the episodes: one opening theme and one ending theme. The opening theme is "Yume, Hitohira" (夢、ひとひら; lit. Dream, Petal) by Yūko Asami, and the ending theme is "Smile" (スマイル, Sumairu) by Mai Mizuhashi.

Six DVD compilations, each containing two episodes of the series, have been released by Media Factory. The first was released on June 22, 2007, and the sixth on November 22, 2007.

== Episode list ==
No.	Title	Original release date
1	"It's, It's Impossible..."; Transliteration: "Mu, Muri Desu..." (Japanese: む、無理です...)	March 28, 2007
Mugi Asai, a young shy girl entering high school, is unsure on what clubs she should join. After she accidentally displays her loud vocal skills due to an excited outburst, the president of the Drama Research Society, Nono Ichinose, comes to her to ask her to join her club. After some minor pressure by Nono, Mugi signs up for the club, but is still unsure what this will entail.
2	"Imi...tation?"; Transliteration: "Magai...mono?" (Japanese: まがい......物?)	April 4, 2007
Mugi attends her first meeting with the Drama Research Society and finds out there are only five members including herself. During this meeting, she finds out that she will inevitably have to act in an upcoming play that the club will put on, something that Mugi is unsure she can handle. The following day, the Drama Research Society are practicing on the roof of the school, and Chitose Kanna from the Drama Club comes to help them.
3	"Debut"; Transliteration: "Hatsubutai" (Japanese: 初舞台)	April 11, 2007
The Drama Research Society's first public performance is coming up, and Mugi is nearly petrified to appear on stage. Nono manages to get Mugi out of a bathroom stall she had locked herself in, and then the club starts to hand out fliers to promote the event. During dress rehearsal, Chitose bursts into the auditorium and asks if Nono really is suffering from a latent form of vocal cord paralysis, and this is confirmed by Nono herself. During the play, Nono calms down Mugi enough for her to go on stage and she manages to get through her lines well enough.
4	"I'm Doing My Best?!"; Transliteration: "Ganbatteru...?!" (Japanese: 頑張ってる...?!)	April 18, 2007
In class, Mugi is contemplating on skipping on club activities and wonder if she can become a delinquent. Nono and the other members of the Drama Research Society arrive and take her and Kai Nishida, Risaki Nishida's younger brother who is in the same club, out for some exercises in the school yard. After a small confrontation between Nono and Mirei Sakaki, the Drama Club president, Nono bets her club's funds that each of her members will get in the top fifty place for their upcoming midterms, which is later increased to top thirty. The Drama Research Society thus has a study session together where Mugi learns more about the club's past with the Drama Club.
5	"Waaaa!"; Transliteration: "Uwaaaaan" (Japanese: うわぁぁぁぁん)	April 25, 2007
Summer has arrived and Nono decides to take the Drama Research Society on a little trip to the beach for their practicing session. The moment they arrive they begin to practice, and Nono explains that since they do not have much time, they must train as much as possible. Late on the first night at the beach, the club is practicing their lines from Nono's script, Hitohira, and Nono informs Mugi that she is to be the lead actress. Mugi thinks this is impossible for her which leads Nono to tell her to leave if she thinks she cannot do it. Mugi leaves distraught and Kai goes to run after her. Meanwhile, Risaki is angry about what Nono said to Mugi and cannot hold back her rage any longer, resulting in her punching Nono in the face; the two of them get into a fist fight.
6	"...Can I Change?"; Transliteration: "...Kawaremasuka?" (Japanese: ...変われますか?)	May 2, 2007
The Drama Research Society is still away during their summer practice session, though things have gotten complicated. Risaki and Nono are still fighting, and Mugi is still unsure about whether she should quit or not. After thinking about it, however, she decides not to quit the club. Mugi goes to Nono and apologizes for what she said earlier to her, namely that Nono can do everything she cannot and it would be impossible for her to act as the lead actress. The rest of the time is spent practicing for the play and playing with fireworks. After summer is over, Mugi's personality has changed slightly and she is more confident than before.
7	"Even Though They are Friends..."; Transliteration: "Tomodachi Nanoni..." (Japanese: 友達なのに...)	May 9, 2007
As October winds by, the Drama Research Society continues to practice. Mugi has more confidence now and is able to speak with a louder voice during practice, which makes Chitose want to work even harder so as not to lose to her. Later, Risaki steals the blackout curtain from the Drama Club, and Nono goes to return it in the storeroom in a part of the school where most students do not go because it is out of the way. When Mirei goes to the storeroom to look for it, she finds Nono already there, but as they attempt to leave, they find the door is stuck, leaving them in a dire situation until someone comes around to find them.
8	"You are Not Alone"; Transliteration: "Hitori Janai" (Japanese: 一人じゃない)	May 16, 2007
The school cultural festival is finally here and all of the classes are busy with their individual events, such as a maid café for Mugi's class and a costume dango stall for Nono's class. The Drama Research Society gets the chance to see some of the Drama Club's performance before finally getting in their costumes before the play. At the play, Mugi is still nervous about being on stage, and cannot project her voice very far. When Nono's turn comes to speak her lines, she finds she has already lost her voice, and the other actors must back her up while working around her lines. Mugi finally gets the confidence she needs after Nono weakly speaks a single line, and unleashes her booming voice.
9	"This Day Will Not be Forgotten!"; Transliteration: "Kono hi o Wasurenai!" (Japanese: この日を忘れない!)	May 23, 2007
Mugi and the rest of the Drama Research Society manage to finish the play and end up getting an ovation of applause from the audience. Afterwards, the members of the audience vote for best performance, and the balls are counting in front of a crowd. In the end, the Drama Club wins, which means the Drama Research Society must now disband. The Society have one last meeting together where they recount how they came to be members of the club, and Mugi especially is very thankful to have joined.
10	"Always... Together..."; Transliteration: "Zutto... Issho..." (Japanese: ずっと...一緒...)	May 30, 2007
With the Drama Research Society disbanded, the members manage to go back to a normal life without having to worry about club activities. Winter soon sets in, and Chitose wants to throw a Christmas party so that she will have a chance to confess her love to her crush; Risaki, Nono, and Mirei are invited too. At the party, Kayo informs Mugi that she will be leaving school to go abroad in order to become more proficient in photography, which leaves Mugi distraught at the idea of losing such a close friend.
11	"I Love... Your Smile!"; Transliteration: "Egao ga... Suki!" (Japanese: 笑顔が...好き!!)	June 6, 2007
Kayo is going to leave soon, and Mugi starts to avoid her friends due to the pain of losing such a close friend. Chitose and Kai try to help her confront her feelings through talking with her, but eventually resort to getting her to come to the theater so that she can tell Kayo how she feels.
12	"Thank You... Very Much!"; Transliteration: "Arigatō... Gozaimashita!" (Japanese: ありがとう...ございました!)	June 13, 2007
Since graduation is almost here, the members of the Drama Club hold a party to celebrate those who have passed their entrance exams into college, and the members of the former Drama Research Society are invited as well except for Risaki, who had yet to pass any of her exams. At the event, Chitose confesses her love to her crush in private, but he has to turn her down because he already likes Nono. After the seniors have graduated, Mugi shows Nono that her personality has changed due to the events of the past year and she thanks Nono for all she did for her.
