= Hirari =

Japanese manga magazine

- Cover of the final issue of Hirari featuring art by Hiromi Takashima
- Categories: Yuri manga
- Frequency: Quarterly
- Publisher: Shinshokan
- First issue: April 24, 2010
- Final issue: July 30, 2014
- Country: Japan
- Language: Japanese

Hirari (Japanese: ひらり) was a Japanese yuri manga magazine published by Shinshokan. It was published from April 24, 2010, to July 30, 2014, and had a total of 14 issues.

== Serialized works ==
- Kase-san by Hiromi Takashima
- Engekibu no Majo to Kishi by Inumaru
- Fuwafuwa no Kimochi by Asuka Sasada
- Hakoniwa Cosmos by Noriko Kuwata
- Honto no Kanojo by Yoko Imamura
- Hoshi o Futari de by Ayami Kazama
- I Love You Yori Aishiteru by Kumichou
- Kindred Spirits on the Roof by Hachi Ito
- Koubai no Procyon by Fukasaku Emi
- Laika, Pavlov, Pochihachikou by Furiko Yotsuhara
- Onnanoko no Sekkeizu by Konno Kita
- Parlor by Fujio
- Pink Rush by Tono
- Salomelic by Hakamada Mera
- Sayounara Mutsuki-chan by Isoya Yuki
- Secret of the Princess by Milk Morinaga
- Seijun Shoujo Paradigm by Akiko Morishima
- Shuuden ni wa Kaeshimasu by Gido Amagakure
- Sono Yo ni Tada Hitori by Fuji Tamaki
- Watashi no Kirai na Otomodachi by Sumako Kari
