= Kasugano =

Japanese family name

Kasugano (written: 春日野) is a family name in the Japanese language and may refer to:

- Kasugano stable, is a stable of sumo wrestlers
  - Gunpachi Kasugano, mid 18th century sumo wrestler and founder of the Kasugano stable
- Nara Kasugano International Forum Iraka
- Yachiyo Kasugano, former member of the musical theater troupe Takarazuka Revue

== Fictional characters ==
- Eri Kasugano, a main character in the 2002 manga series Amakusa 1637
- Haruka Kasugano, a main character in the anime/visual novel Yosuga No Sora
  - Sora Kasugano, one of the supporting characters in the anime/visual novel Yosuga No Sora
- Hiyori Kasugano, one of the supporting characters in the anime/manga series Sketchbook ~full color's~
- Midori Kasugano, a main character in the anime Midori Days
  - Haruka Kasugano, Midori's mother and one of the supporting characters in the anime Midori Days
- Nene Kasugano, one of the supporting characters in the manga/anime series Potemayo
  - Anishazu Kasugano, one of the supporting characters in the manga/anime series Potemayo
  - Kira Kasugano, one of the supporting characters in the manga/anime series Potemayo
- Ray Kasugano, a main character in the anime/manga series Ray
  - Dr. Kasugano, one of the supporting characters in the anime/manga series Ray
- Sakura Kasugano, one of the supporting characters in the anime/video game series Street Fighter
- Shion Kasugano, one of the supporting characters in the anime series Star-Myu
- Sumire Kasugano, one of the supporting characters in the anime/manga series Mahou Tsukai Sally
- Tsubaki Kasugano, one of the supporting characters in the manga/anime series Mirai Nikki
- Urara Kasugano, a main character in the anime Sabagebu!
- Urara Kasugano (a.k.a. Cure Lemonade), one of the main characters in the anime series Yes! PreCure 5
  - Heizou Kasugano, Urara's grandfather and one of the supporting characters in the anime series Yes! PreCure 5
  - Maria Kasugano, Urara's mother and one of the minor characters in the anime series Yes! PreCure 5
  - Michel Kasugano, one of the supporting characters in the anime series Yes! PreCure 5
