= Towa Oshima =

Japanese manga artist

Towa Oshima 大島 永遠
- Born: February 2, 1979 (age 47)
- Area: Manga artist
- Notable works: High School Girls

Towa Oshima (大島 永遠, Ōshima Towa; born February 2, 1979) is a Japanese manga artist. She is best known for the manga, High School Girls which was adapted to an anime called Girl's High. Her father, Yasuichi Oshima, was a successful manga artist as well.

== Manga ==
- High School Girls (2001–06), originally serialized in Futabasha's Weekly Manga Action magazine from 2001–04, then Comic High! from 2004–06.
- Mel Kano - Serialized in Japan by Monthly Sunday Gene-X Magazine.
- 同棲レシピ (dōsei reshipi) - Serialized in Japan by Square Enix's bi-weekly Young Gangan Magazine.
- Berry Ecstasy
- Towakan
- Dousei Recipe
- Joshikousei: Girls-Live – a sequel to High School Girls
