= LGBTQ literature in Japan =

LGBTQ literature in Japanese written works that explore themes of same-sex attraction, gender identity, and sexual diversity encompassing Japanese culture and society. Its roots extend back centuries, and it has evolved significantly through the modern and contemporary periods into a recognized and commercially successful literary genre.

== Historical background ==
Japan has a long literary tradition that touches on same-sex relationships, predating the modern concept of sexual identity. Male same-sex love, known as shudō (shudo) or nanshoku (sonshoku), was extensively documented in pre-modern literature, particularly in the context of samurai culture and Buddhist monasteries. The writer Ihara Saikaku is among the most notable early figures in this tradition; his 1687 work Nanshoku Ōkagami ("The Great Mirror of Male Love") is a collection of stories celebrating male same-sex relationships across various social classes.

Female same-sex relationships also appeared in classical literature, though less prominently. Certain passages in The Tale of Genji (c. 11th century), attributed to Murasaki Shikibu, have been interpreted by scholars as depicting emotional and romantic bonds between women.

== Modern period (Meiji to postwar) ==
The Meiji period (1868–1912) brought significant Western influence to Japan, including Western medical and psychological frameworks around sexuality, which began to shape how same-sex desire was discussed and depicted in literature. The concept of dōseiai (homosexuality), a direct translation of "homosexuality," entered common usage during this era.

Novelist Mori Ōgai and poet Yosano Akiko both produced works during the Meiji and Taisho periods that touched – with varying degrees of directness – on non-normative desire and gender.

In the postwar period, Yukio Mishima emerged as one of the most significant literary figures to engage with same-sex themes. His 1949 novel Confessions of a Mask ( Kamen no Kokuhaku ) is a semi-autobiographical work narrating a young man's awakening to his attraction to other men, and remains one of the most widely read and studied works of Japanese LGBTQ literature internationally.

== Shōjo manga and the Takarazuka influence ==
A distinctive strand of LGBTQ literary and visual culture developed through shōjo manga (comics aimed at young women) from the late 1960s onward. The Year 24 Group — a cohort of female manga artists born around 1949 – pioneered the shōnen-ai genre, which depicted romantic relationships between beautiful young men. Works such as Moto Hagio's The Heart of Thomas (1974) and Keiko Takemiya's Kaze to Ki no Uta ("The Song of Wind and Trees", 1976) are considered foundational texts of the genre, which later evolved into yaoi and Boys' love (BL) fiction, now a major commercial category in Japanese publishing.

Parallel to this, the Takarazuka Revue — an all-female theatrical troupe founded in 1913 – cultivated a devoted following and influenced a distinct aesthetic around gender performance and female same-sex desire that permeated literature and popular culture.

=== Contemporary literature ===
Contemporary Japanese LGBTQ literature spans literary fiction, popular fiction, and manga, reflecting a broader cultural shift toward greater – if still incomplete – visibility of LGBTQ people in Japanese society.

Banana Yoshimoto's Kitchen (1988) and several of her subsequent works feature transgender and gender-nonconforming characters with warmth and matter-of-factness, reaching an enormous treated mainstream readership both in Japan and internationally.

Fuminori Nakamura, Hiromi Kawakami, and other contemporary literary authors have incorporated LGBTQ characters and relationships into works not specifically categorized as LGBTQ fiction, reflecting a gradual normalization within mainstream literature.

Novelist and activist Ira Ishida and writer Gengoroh Tagame have contributed significantly to gay male literature. Tagame, best known internationally for his graphic novels, received widespread mainstream recognition with My Brother's Husband (Otōto no Otto, 2014), a manga series exploring the relationship between a Japanese man and his late brother's Canadian husband, which was adapted for television in 2018.

Lesbian literature has historically been less visible than gay male writing, though authors such as Erika Mizuno and the pseudonymous writer Milk Morinaga — known for the manga series Girl Friends — have contributed to a growing body of work centered on relationships between women.

== Boys' Love and Girls' Love fiction ==
Boys' love and Girls' Love (also called yuri) fiction constitute commercially significant publishing categories in contemporary Japan. BL in particular is a multi-billion-yen industry, produced predominantly by women and consumed largely – though not exclusively – by a female readership. The relationship between BL fiction and the lived experiences of gay men in Japan has been the subject of ongoing critical debate among scholars and within the LGBTQ community itself.

Yuri manga and fiction, focusing on romantic relationships between women, has grown substantially as a distinct genre since the 2000s, with dedicated manga anthologies and a committed readership.

== Critical reception and scholarship ==
Japanese LGBTQ literature has attracted growing academic attention both domestically and internationally. Scholars such as Keith Vincent, and Midori Matsui have written broadly on the intersection of sexuality, gender, and literary representation in Japan. The field draws on queer theory while also interrogating the extent to which Western theoretical frameworks apply to distinctly Japanese cultural and historical contexts.

== See also ==
- LGBTQ rights in Japan
- Shōnen-aii
- Takarazuka Revue
- Yukio Mishima
