= Hana & Hina After School =

Manga by Milk Morinaga

- Front cover of the first volume

ハナとヒナは放課後 (Hana to Hina wa Hōkago)
- Genre: Romance, yuri
- Manga
- Written by: Milk Morinaga
- Published by: Futabasha
- English publisher: Seven Seas Entertainment
- Magazine: Comic High! (until June 2015); Monthly Action
- Original run: April 22, 2015 – November 25, 2016
- Volumes: 3

Hana & Hina After School (ハナとヒナは放課後, Hana to Hina wa Hōkago) is a yuri manga (girl's love comic) written and illustrated by Milk Morinaga, and serialized by Futabasha in the magazine Comic High! until June 2015, and then in Monthly Action. In August 2016, Morinaga announced that she is ending the series in November. The manga is translated and published in English by Seven Seas Entertainment.

== Plot ==
Hana Hasegawa is a discreet student in second year of high school, who is working in a shop after school. One evening, Hinako Emori, a gyaru and regular customer asks to meet the manager about a job offer. Later, Hana discovers that Hina has actually just entered her school as a first year student. The story follows the development of their relationship after school, which starts with friendship and later evolves in a romantic way.

== Characters ==
Hana Hasegawa (長谷川 花)
Hana is in second year of high school. She is short and cute, with a very classic style. Even though it's forbidden by the rules of her school, she works in a shop after classes, even if she doesn't really know the products she sells. She loves cute clothes, like the ones she wears at the shop, and works to buy more of them. Only Nakano, her best friend, knows about this job. Hana is really surprised when she learns that Hina joined her school as a first year, and decides that to keep their jobs secret, they shouldn't be seen together at school. Later, when she hear that Hina is also model for a magazine, Hana search for pictures of her, and discovers a Hina as pretty as ever. It's from this moment that Hina begins to occupy her thoughts. She eventually gets jealous when Hina shows herself very social with the other schoolmates. She sometimes feels indebted towards Hina who helped her several times, and feels guilty when Hina is threatened of being expelled. During the school sport festival, Hana fake being hurt to cover Hina. This is the occasion for the girls to spend time at school, and finally share their contact informations.
Hinako Emori (江森 ひなこ)
Hina is a first year student in the same school as Hana. She is tall, beautiful and quiet with gaits of gyaru; she gives the impression of being far older despite her young age. She worked several times as a model for a magazine. She likes everything that is cute and especially Pokotam accessories, a character that looks like a tanuki. This is what leads her to the shop Hana works for, and then make her fall for the girl. Hina therefore catches every opportunity to see her in cute clothes. She even starts to work in the shop to be able to stay close to the one she loves. Hina love cute things since forever, and she is more conscious of the feelings she have for Hana, than Hana is about her. However, she remains discreet and anxious about her feelings because the remarks that her classmates said her younger have marked her.

== Publication ==
No.	Original release date	Original ISBN	English release date	English ISBN
1	12 January 2016	978-4-575-84740-6	14 March 2017	978-1-626924-62-8
2	11 June 2016	978-4-575-84812-0	18 July 2017	978-1-626925-24-3
3	12 January 2017	978-4-575-84916-5	14 November 2017	978-1-626925-76-2

== Reception ==
Erica Friedman considered the series to be "[Milk Morinaga's] strongest work to date." Reviewing the English editions of Volumes 1 and 2, Rebecca Silverman of Anime News Network found the manga to be a "really enjoyable time", complimenting Morinaga's artwork, but also saying that some phrases in the first volume of Seven Seas Entertainment's translation read awkwardly.

The English release of the first two volumes were included on the American Library Association's list of 2018 Great Graphic Novels for Teens.
