= Chu-Bra!! =

Japanese manga series

- Cover of the first manga volume featuring Nayu Hayama

ちゅーぶら!! (Chū Bura!!)
- Genre: Comedy
- Manga
- Written by: Yumi Nakata
- Published by: Futabasha
- Magazine: Comic High!
- Original run: January 22, 2007 – April 22, 2011
- Volumes: 7
- Anime television series
- Directed by: Yukina Hiiro
- Produced by: Tomoko Kawasaki; Takahiro Yamanaka
- Written by: Reiko Yoshida
- Music by: Yoshihisa Hirano
- Studio: Zexcs
- Licensed by: NA: Media Blasters (Note: Streaming rights are also held by WWWave.)
- Original network: AT-X
- Original run: January 4, 2010 – March 22, 2010
- Episodes: 12

Chū-Bra!! (Japanese: ちゅーぶら!!, Hepburn: Chū Bura!!; "Kiss Bra") is a Japanese manga series written and illustrated by Yumi Nakata. The manga was serialized in Futabasha's Comic High! magazine from January 22, 2007, to April 22, 2011, and the chapters collected into seven tankōbon volumes. An anime television series adaptation animated by Zexcs aired from January 4 to March 22, 2010.

== Plot ==
The story revolves around Nayu Hayama, who embarrasses herself on the first day of middle school by accidentally showing her adult panties. As two other students, Yako Jingūji and Haruka Shiraishi, hear rumors of her engaging in "enjo kōsai", or compensated dating (which often is viewed as being close to or the same as prostitution), they investigate. They soon learn that Nayu is an "underwear monitor" who tests new underwear products, and has great insight on what underwear people should wear. Nayu hopes to help everyone get through the vital stage of their life by opening an underwear club.

== Characters ==
Nayu Hayama (葉山 奈由, Hayama Nayu)
Voiced by: Minori Chihara (Japanese); Brittany Lauda (English)
The protagonist of the story, who also acts as an 'underwear monitor'. She takes keen interest in underwear research. As a result, she is pretty shameless when it comes to her underwear, or anyone else's for that matter. Determined to inform people about the necessities of underwear, she forms the Underwear Appreciation Society with the encouragement of Hiroki. Her motto is "A great day starts with a great pair of panties."
Yako Jingūji (神宮寺弥子, Jingūji Yako)
Voiced by: Minako Kotobuki (Japanese); Su Ling Chan (English)
A petite girl with a generally fierce composure. Her family runs a kendo dojo, and thanks to her father's training, Yako is quite skilled in the way of the sword. She prefers to keep a tough image, and has a hard time admitting embarrassing things- such as liking cute or "girly" things.
Haruka Shiraishi (白石 遥, Shiraishi Haruka)
Voiced by: Sayuri Yahagi (Japanese); Kayli Mills (English)
A busty girl and Yako's best friend. She was ostracized back in grade school for developing at a young age. She often has trouble with males, as the boys at school tend to mock or objectify her because of her bust size. Helping to raise her three younger brothers, Nayu and Yako are often in awe of her motherly nature. She appears to have some romantic feelings for Nayu, leading some to suspect her of being a lesbian.
Hiroki Komachi (小町 陽樹, Komachi Hiroki)
Voiced by: Yūdai Satō (Japanese); Kevin Thelwell (English)
A serious boy who is embarrassed by the sight of underwear. He has a one-sided rivalry with Nayu on school grades as he always ends up being second to her. Over time, he seems to have a small crush on her (which he may be unaware of). Despite his conflicted feelings (for both Nayu and the Association), he remains loyal to the group. He gets angry with anyone (usually other boys) who think he joined the group for perverted reasons.
Kiyono Amahara (天原 清乃, Amahara Kiyono)
Voiced by: Yōko Hikasa (Japanese); Kira Buckland (English)
A girl from a rich family who seems to be rather knowledgeable about the seedier side of underwear, and looks down upon Nayu for her naivety. She considers herself as adult and even breaks the school rules just to look like one. She may harbor some resentment towards her mother, believing that she has to "surpass" her.
Tamaki Mizuno (水野 環, Mizuno Tamaki)
Voiced by: Sayaka Ohara (Japanese); Natalie Rose (English)
A young and very busty teacher at Nayu's school. She seems unaware of her appearance at first, wearing clothes that is either loose or too tight. She later becomes the adviser of the Underwear Appreciation Society. She is generally nervous, but admires Nayu for giving her courage about her femininity. She seems to have a crush on Keigo, who was her senpai in high school.
Keigo Hayama (葉山 圭吾, Hayama Keigo)
Voiced by: Takahiro Sakurai (Japanese); Alex Mai (English)
Nayu's step-brother who has been looking after her since their parents died. He works as an underwear designer and often gets Nayu to test out his latest products. Because of his line of work, some characters (especially Haruka and Yako) believe that he is a pervert when first meeting him. Though the girls quickly become much more at ease around him.

== Media ==
=== Manga ===
Chū-Bra!! was written and illustrated by Yumi Nakata. It was serialized in Futabasha's Comic High! magazine from January 22, 2007, to April 22, 2011, and the chapters collected into 7 tankōbon volumes.

=== Anime ===
An anime television series adaptation animated by Zexcs aired on AT-X from January 4 to March 22, 2010. It uses two pieces of theme music; the opening theme is "Choose Bright!!" by Minori Chihara, Minako Kotobuki, Sayuri Yahagi and Yoko Hikasa, while the ending theme is "Shy Girls" by Chihara, Kotobuki, Yahagi and Hikasa. The last episode uses "We Know" by Chihara, Kotobuki, Yahagi, and Hikasa as an end theme.

==== English release ====
This series is licensed by Media Blasters in North America and streamed on Crunchyroll. The English dub of Chu-Bra! was released on home video on March 11, 2025 along with the streaming of the series in both languages on WWWave's OceanVeil video on demand service that premiered on December 1, 2025.

==== Episodes ====
No.	Title	Original release date
1	"The Girl with the Adult Panties"; Transliteration: "Otona Pantsu no Onna no Ko" (Japanese: おとなパンツの女の子)	January 4, 2010
On the first day of middle school, Nayu Hayama accidentally shows her black lace panties during the opening ceremony. Yako Jingūji and Haruka Shiraishi hear rumors of her doing "enjo-kosai" or prostitution, and spot her talking on the phone about uncomfortable underwear to a man who arrives to deliver her some underwear. Curious, the two follow Nayu to the underwear department, but run off when they are spotted. When Nayu catches up to them the next day, she grabs Haruka's breasts from out of the blue, prompting both Yako and Haruka to keep their distance from her. Yako tries to find undeniable evidence by getting a photo shot under her skirt, but starts to slip down the stairs. Haruka grabs her and Nayu grabs Haruka, though they end up falling regardless. Nayu explains that she is an underwear monitor who tries different types of products, and mentions she was inspecting Haruka because her bra was too small. Although the resulting chaos in trying to get the proper measurements leaves Nayu with a worse reputation than she already had, she, Yako and Haruka become friends.
2	"This Swelling Chest"; Transliteration: "Kono Mune no Fukurami o" (Japanese: この胸のふくらみを)	January 11, 2010
When wondering about which club to join, Yako gets a bit agitated when her mother is brought up. While changing, Nayu spots Yako with a bra her mother brought, who gets riled up when Nayu tells her it is too soon for her to wear one. She tries it on anyway and it ends up shifting during PE. Embarrassed, Yako vows never to wear a bra again. Nayu, with the help of her step-brother Keigo, makes a no-cup for Yako, but she declines it. She reveals she is embarrassed to wear a bra over her flat chest since it might cause others to laugh at her. When Nayu explains to her about her breasts swelling, she finally convinces Yako to wear the bra, which she finds more comfortable. While discussing what she went through to make it, the idea of an underwear club springs to Nayu's mind.
3	"A Windy Day"; Transliteration: "Kaze no Tsuyoi Hi" (Japanese: 風の強い日)	January 18, 2010
One of the male students, Hiroki Komachi, tries to have a word with Nayu, but ends up getting occupied at every chance he gets. Nayu, Haruka and Yako take a look at the Crafts club, but leave when the club's adviser, Tsukamoto, shows disdain to the idea of making underwear. Noticing Nayu is disheartened, Yako suggests that she make an Underwear Club herself. The next day, Hiroki complains to Nayu concerning an apparent rivalry, but is annoyed that Nayu doesn't remember him. Nayu inquires about how to start her club, but is put down again by Tsukamoto. However, after looking at the underwear her grandma gave her, she perks up and starts asking around for members, but has trouble finding any. Hiroki talks to Nayu, suggesting that she should try and put across her vision of underwear for better results.
4	"To Each Their Own Figure"; Transliteration: "Sorezore no Katachi" (Japanese: それぞれのカタチ)	January 25, 2010
Haruka feels down when the boys start teasing her for her big breasts, even ranking her #1 in a 'biggest breasts' chart. She and Yako visit Nayu's house, where Nayu asks them to be models for a fitting session to gain awareness for the underwear club. While Yako agrees, Haruka is a little worried about it. Nayu later tells them how she came to live with Keigo after her parents died. Haruka tells Yako about the boys' ranking, but says she will bear with it for Nayu's sake. Nayu manages to get permission to use an empty classroom after educating the teacher, Tamaki Mizuno, about her underwear. The session gets a great turnout and Haruka is surprised by the kind response to her modeling. Hiroki tries to stop some peeping toms, but both he and the girls end up getting lectured by Tsukamoto, saying the underwear club would never come to be. Afterward, the girls stumble upon some underwear that even Nayu has never seen before, and are teased by another student, Kiyono Amahara.
5	"Between an Adult and Child"; Transliteration: "Otona to Kodomo no Aida de" (Japanese: 大人とコドモの間で)	February 1, 2010
Nayu explains her situation to Keigo. Hiroki then comes over to Nayu's house to apologize and ask is there's anything he can do for her, inadvertently offering to help her make an 'Underwear Appreciation Society'. Nayu also manages to convince Yako, Haruka and Mizuno to become members too. They hold the meeting at Nayu's house, where Mizuno is surprised to see Keigo, who was her senpai in high school. Nayu contemplates about love and whether she is adult enough to run a society. Keigo explains to Mizuno about how Nayu's grandmother helped her find confidence in underwear when she was in a bedwetting phase. The next day, Kiyono decides to join the Underwear Appreciation Society.
6	"Extreme Adolescence"; Transliteration: "Kageki na Shishunki" (Japanese: カゲキな思春期)	February 8, 2010
After Kiyono joins the society, the girls become aware of her habit of teasing what's under her skirt in front of boys. She flips up Yako's skirt and makes fun of the underwear, only to show some embarrassment when she flips hers back. The girls are surprised when Kiyono takes off her underwear before leaving. The next day, a moral exam is held and Kiyono is told off for wearing makeup. In the meeting later that day, Nayu brings a deconstructed bra, but Kiyono shows disinterest. She then insults Mizuno, particularly about her femininity and bra choice, and shows everyone catalogs of more kinky underwear. Kiyono argues with Nayu over looks vs comfort, but feels some embarrassment when the topic of who she loves is brought up.
7	"A Man's Heart Wavers"; Transliteration: "Yureru Otoko Gokoro" (Japanese: 揺れるオトコ心)	February 15, 2010
Hiroki's newfound knowledge of underwear is affecting both his concentration and his reputation. Nayu gets a mysterious 'love' letter in her shoebox. Hiroki gets annoyed and decides to quit the underwear society. On his way home, he runs into Keigo, who tells him about Nayu's efforts to make the society more male-friendly. Nayu's confessor had apparently put his letter in the wrong shoe box, and Hiroki apologizes to Nayu and gives the society another shot.
8	"Underwear Summer Training Camp!"; Transliteration: "Shitagi na Natsu Gasshuku!" (Japanese: 下着な夏合宿！)	February 22, 2010
Mizuno has a rather dubious dream about Keigo. The next day the Underwear Society go on an overnight trip to a beach hotel where Nayu's grandmother used to stay. Mizuno brings her old school swimsuit which the girl's accidentally wreck while trying to remove the nametag, so they take her to buy a new one. After rain cancels the swim session, the girl's go to a hot spring, where Hiroki passes out over hearing the girls, and is embarrassed to find that they carried him naked over to his bed. After the girls give Mizuno a makeover, the hotel mistress tells them about Nayu's grandmother. After a trip to the beach the next day, everyone heads back all sleepy, although Hiroki is annoyed that they didn't discuss any club activities the whole time.
9	"Seventh Grade Summer Vacation"; Transliteration: "Chūichi no Natsuyasumi" (Japanese: 中一の夏休み)	March 1, 2010
Yako gets annoyed when her childhood friend, Kota, who insulted her flat chest when she tried changing in front of him. Haruka feels some tightness in her chest, which Mizuno deducing that she is starting to develop feelings towards Hiroki. As the girls head off to a summer festival, Kiyono explains to Yako that Kota felt hurt because he wasn't being registered as a member of the opposite sex. With some encouragement from Hiroki, she goes to apologize. When Haruka accidentally gets a goldfish down her cleavage, she feels the tightness again when Nayu adjusts her bra. Nayu recognizes from her underwear that Haruka seems to be in love with someone, though she doesn't get round to saying who. After Nayu helps a lost child, Keigo receives a mail that he has been chosen for the Kyoto Office.
10	"Stick Out Your Chest"; Transliteration: "Tsun to Mune o Hatte" (Japanese: ツンと胸を張って)	March 8, 2010
Kiyono reveals she is going to be a model for her mother's underwear collection, but has a problem with her current breast size. Nayu and the others try to help make them bigger, but to no avail. She tries doing the shoot wearing a slightly bigger bra, but it's soon noticed and when her mother confronts her about it, she runs off. Spotting some more comfortable bra prototypes, Nayu decides to decorate them to fit Kiyono's likes better. Kiyono's mother gives them their thanks, and also mentions Keigo's offer to Nayu. After being featured in the magazine as the designers, the Underwear Society are approached by the drama club to produce underwear for their costumes for the cultural festival. When Nayu asks Keigo about his offer, he tells her that he is going to Kyoto.
11	"Afternoon with Her"; Transliteration: "Kanojo to Ita Gogo" (Japanese: 彼女といた午後)	March 15, 2010
As the Underwear Society make preparations for the drama club, they are asked to participate in the performance. After school, Nayu runs into Kiyono, who had heard about Keigo's job offer. The next day, Nayu takes on some extra work while Kiyono tells Hiroki about Nayu's apparent transfer. He confronts Nayu about this, who asks him to stay quiet until after the festival. On the day of the festival, Tsukamoto confronts Mizuno and Nayu about the society's appearance in the magazine. She asks the play to be canceled, but Mizuno stands up to her and tells her to hold her judgment until after she's seen their work. However, during her inspection, Nayu's old elementary school teacher comes in a berates Nayu. Thankfully, both the society members and Tsukamoto stand up to him, the latter of which allows the play to take place. After a successful performance, Nayu tells Yako and Haruka that she's transferring as Keigo tells Mizuno the same thing.
12	"Until I Met You"; Transliteration: "Anata ni Au made wa" (Japanese: あなたに逢うまでは)	March 22, 2010
Haruka feels betrayed by Nayu's announcement and stops being friends with her. That same night, Mizuno's apartment catches fire. These events leave everyone in a negative mood, and Nayu's texts to Haruka fall upon deaf ears. Later on, the girls help Nayu with her move, but Haruka doesn't show. After Yako pleas with her to make her final goodbye, Haruka finally meets up with Nayu the next day and the two finally apologize. Haruka, Yako and Hiroki see off Nayu as she heads to Kyoto, while they keep up the Underwear Society. However, Nayu later comes back after Keigo and Mizuno make arrangements for her to stay at school.
