= Gakuen Polizi =

Japanese manga series

- Cover of the first volume in English

学園ポリーチェ (Gakuen Porīche)
- Genre: Romance, yuri
- Manga
- Written by: Milk Morinaga
- Published by: Futabasha
- English publisher: NA: Seven Seas Entertainment
- Magazine: Comic High!
- Original run: May 2012 – June 21, 2014
- Volumes: 2

Gakuen Polizi (Japanese: 学園ポリーチェ, Hepburn: Gakuen Porīche; "School Police") is a Japanese romance yuri manga series written and illustrated by Milk Morinaga and serialized in Comic High! by Futabasha. It's published in English by Seven Seas Entertainment.

== Plot ==
Police officer Sasami Aoba is assigned to enter an all girls High School as an undercover cop to monitor for any suspicious activity, but when she arrives there she discovers that there is already another officer assigned to the school. Sakuraba Midori is her name, and the two of them are forced to become partners and watch over the school together.

== Characters ==
Sasami Aoba
Since a young age Aoba always wanted to be a police officer, and she takes her job of protecting the school very seriously, helping students resolve problems no matter how small they are. She is a novice officer, so she frequently makes mistakes and bends the rules.
Sakuraba Midori
Midori is a more experienced officer who was assigned to the school by her overprotective father. She is strict and frequently gets annoyed by Aoba's behaviour.

== Manga ==
No.	Original release date	Original ISBN	English release date	English ISBN
1	12 March 2013	978-4-575-84204-3	17 June 2014	978-1-626920-30-9
2	10 September 2014	978-4-575-84484-9	14 April 2015	978-1-626920-43-9

== Reception ==
On Anime News Network, Rebecca Silverman, in a review of volume 1, said the series is "clearly going to get better and on par with Morinaga's other works, but as a start, it's slow and a little confusing". Erica Friedman gave volume 1 an overall rating of 8, and called it "a solid beginning to something completely different from Morinaga Milk-sensei".
