= Fujoshi Rumi =

Manga

- Media Blasters' English-language edition of Fujoshi Rumi

妄想少女オタク系 (Mōsō Shōjo Otaku-kei)
- Genre: Comedy
- Manga
- Written by: Natsumi Konjoh
- Published by: Futabasha
- English publisher: NA: Media Blasters JManga
- Magazine: Comic High!
- Original run: 2004 – 2010
- Volumes: 7
- Live-action film
- Directed by: Teiichi Hori
- Written by: Yoshiaki Tago, Shikō Onoue
- Music by: Kantoku Nijikamatarō
- Studio: Dōgadō
- Released: December 8, 2007
- Runtime: 113 minutes

Fujoshi Rumi (妄想少女オタク系, Mōsō Shōjo Otaku-kei; lit. Geeky Girl Obsession) is a Japanese seinen manga series written and illustrated by manga author Natsumi Konjoh (紺條夏生, Konjō Natsumi).

== Plot ==
The series is a comedic romance between two high-school fujoshi and the boys who fall in love with them; much of the humor comes from parodies of stereotypical fujoshi behavior and other otaku topics, and a large number of pop culture references.

== Release ==
It was first serialized in Japan on April 12, 2006, in Futabasha's seinen manga magazine Comic High!. The series has been licensed in the United States by Media Blasters. It was adapted into a live action drama in 2007. The series was available in English in digital format from JManga under the title Otaku-Type Delusion Girl. It has been released in French by Bamboo Edition's Doki-Doki imprint under the title Otaku Girls.

== Volumes ==
| No. | Original release date | Original ISBN | English release date | English ISBN |
|---|---|---|---|---|
| 1 | December 12, 2006 | 4-575-83225-1 | February 19, 2008 | 1598831860 |
| 2 | April 12, 2006 | 4-575-83312-6 | April 8, 2008 | 1598831887 |
| 3 | August 11, 2007 | 978-4-575-83394-2 | February 17, 2009 | 1598833901 |
| 4 | June 12, 2008 | 978-4-575-83496-3 | | |
| 5 | February 12, 2009 | 978-4-575-83581-6 | | |
| 6 | December 12, 2009 | 978-4-575-83705-6 | | |
| 7 | September 11, 2010 | 978-4-575-83810-7 | | |

== Reception ==
The Media Blasters translation of Fujoshi Rumi released to mixed positive reviews, with Anime News Network giving the first two volumes an overall B−, stating "There are a number of typos in the first volume, and several text boxes and balloons are missing words in the second. ... Even so, Fujoshi Rumi is without a doubt one of Media Blasters' best manga releases to date and far and away the best in quite a long time." Pop Culture Shock also reviewed the first two volumes, praising the series' humor, translation notes, and pop culture references. Sequential Tart called the series a "fan-friendly little bubble of fictional high school life".
