= Akatsuki-iro no Senpuku Majo =

Japanese manga series

- Akatsuki-iro no Senpuku Majo volume 1

暁色の潜伏魔女
- Genre: Romance, Yuri
- Manga
- Written by: Mera Hakamada
- Published by: Futabasha
- English publisher: NA: Seven Seas Entertainment (dropped)
- Magazine: Comic High!
- Original run: August 22, 2006 – April 22, 2008
- Volumes: 3

Akatsuki-iro no Senpuku Majo (暁色の潜伏魔女; lit. "Dawn-colored Hiding Witch") is a Japanese manga series written and illustrated by manga author Mera Hakamada, who has also written The Last Uniform. The manga was serialized in the Japanese seinen manga magazine Comic High! between August 22, 2006, and April 22, 2008, and is published by Futabasha. The manga has been licensed by Los Angeles–based company Seven Seas Entertainment for distribution in the English language, but the company no longer has the license. The first bound volume was released in Japanese on April 12, 2007, and the third and last bound volume was released in Japanese on May 12, 2008.
