= High School Girls =

Japanese manga and anime series

- Eriko Takahashi on the cover of High School Girls, vol. 1

女子高生 (Joshi Kōsei)
- Manga
- Written by: Towa Oshima
- Published by: Futabasha
- English publisher: US: DrMaster JManga
- Magazine: Manga Action (2001–2004); Comic High! (2004–2006)
- Original run: March 2001 – 2006
- Volumes: 9
- Anime television series

Girl's High
- Directed by: Yoshitaka Fujimoto
- Produced by: Kouhei Kawase; Takaya Ibira; Osamu Koshinaka; Kyouichi Nonaka
- Written by: Hideki Shirane
- Music by: Angel Note
- Studio: Arms Corporation
- Licensed by: US: AnimeWorks
- Original network: AT-X, Chiba TV, Nagoya Broadcasting Network, Sun TV, TV Saitama, TVK
- Original run: April 3, 2006 – June 19, 2006
- Episodes: 12

High School Girls (女子高生, Joshi Kōsei; also known as Girl's High) is a Japanese manga series, created by Towa Oshima, which was originally serialized in Futabasha's Weekly Manga Action magazine from 2001, and then subsequently Comic High! from 2004.

It was adapted in 2006 into an anime television series, entitled Joshikōsei Girl's High (女子高生 GIRL'S-HIGH, Joshikōsei Gāruzu Hai), which premiered in Japan on April 3, 2006, and completed its 12-episode run on June 19, 2006. It was produced by Genco, animated by ARMS, written by Hideki Shirane, and directed by Yoshitaka Fujimoto (director of the anime Cyber Team in Akihabara and Nuku Nuku TV).

A Girl's High PlayStation 2 video game, Joshikōsei Game's High (女子高生 GAME'S-HIGH!!, joshikōsei gēmuzu hai) was made and released in late September 2006.

The manga series was published in North America by DrMaster (formerly ComicsOne), whereas the anime was distributed across the region by Media Blasters, which released the series under the name Girl's High with no English dub available. The series premiered on Toku in the United States in January 2016.

== Plot ==
Eriko and her friends Yuma and Ayano are excited about entering their first year of high school at Yamasaki Academy. Their excitement leads to their breaking of the rules when they toured the school before the opening ceremony. They find out their preconceptions about the school may not be as true as they had first thought. Despite that, Eriko and her friends are joined by new friends. They aim to get through high school life together.

== Characters ==
=== Main characters ===
Eriko Takahashi (高橋 絵里子, Takahashi Eriko)
Voiced by: Hitomi Nabatame (Japanese); Carmen Ambrós (European Spanish)
The happy-go-lucky main character and the leader of the story, Eriko gets good grades but is nevertheless quite clumsy and not at all athletically coordinated (unless it is to escape the many perverts who often cross her path). She tends to be the main victim of the perverted actions (accidental or not) of Odagiri, though she occasionally uses this to blackmail him. Described a few times as "A nosy busybody", Eriko tends to go out of her way to find out people's problems. She's also quite fickle. Eriko is frightened of injections.
Yuma Suzuki (鈴木 由真, Suzuki Yuma)
Voiced by: Masumi Asano (Japanese); Sofia Garcia (European Spanish)
Eriko's friend since middle-school. The two got off to a bad start, but found they had interests in common. Yuma has dyed blonde hair. Yuma has made a career of being the school's best cheater, although she still gets bad grades. She has a younger sister, Momoka. Yuma often pairs up with Eriko, such as in Episode 2 and Episode 7. She is the most short-tempered of the group. Her bunches are something of a trademark, as Odagiri didn't recognize her from behind when she wore it in a bun. She tends to lack in prudence, and ever willing to have fun.
Ayano Sato (佐藤 綾乃, Satō Ayano)
Voiced by: Mamiko Noto (Japanese); Ariadna Giménez (European Spanish)
Yuma's life-long friend. They are close. Ayano may not be the smartest. but she is the ingenue, shy and sweet but annoying one of the group. She wears glasses and her hair in plaits, implying an innocent personality, though she has a vivid imagination which often leads to perverted fantasies (as hinted in her eyecatch). By far the most dim-witted of the group, but out of all the main characters, she is the only one with a steady boyfriend (Takanori Shimotakatani). She often is victim to getting hit by Eriko, Kouda or Yuma for PDAs.
Akari Kouda (香田 あかり, Kōda Akari)
Voiced by: Satsuki Yukino (Japanese); Carmen Calvell (European Spanish)
A rich girl (as seen in her designer accessories from Gucci, Cartier and Prada) and the second in-command of the group, Kouda is at first a rival to Eriko's group, but she quickly becomes friends with them after they brag about going to school with boys. An "insider" (a girl who transfers from the junior high branch of the private school rather than passing an entrance exam, like Eriko and friends did, to get in) who uses her knowledge of the school ways to show the others the ropes. Kouda aspires to become a famous actress, using all of her energy to be as outrageous as possible, so as to leave a lasting impression. She has the habit of dressing in completely bizarre outfits to gain attention, only to change into more normal clothes a split second later.
Kyoko Himeji (姫路 京子, Himeji Kyōko)
Voiced by: Kyoko Hikami (Japanese); Maria Rosa Guillén (European Spanish)
A friend of Kouda's who is the first person that the girls know in their age group who loses her virginity. Himeji is the smart one of the group. She is assumed part of Eriko's "Moron Group" much to her chagrin. Himeji is often flippant in her sex life, letting guys get the better of her, since she is easily tempted. She used to be overweight, but her crush on Odagiri gave her the incentive to lose weight. She is the most protective of Ogawa, and has the largest breasts, much to Kouda's chagrin.
Ikue Ogawa (小川 育恵, Ogawa Ikue)
Voiced by: Sawa Ishige (Japanese); Pilar Morales (European Spanish)
A close friend of Himeji's, which makes her a member of the group by default. She is the cute, petite girl of the group who acts as young as she looks. Ogawa usually comes up with the stupidest, almost Mr. Bean-ish solutions (giving Eriko a "mini sleeping pill" to help her relax because she had been up all night watching Doraemon videos) and games (spilling floor wax and using the cloth to slide on). She loves candy and is very fond of sleeping. She calls Himeji 'Hime-chan' and appears fond of her. Ogawa is the daughter of a drugstore's owner.

=== Supporting characters ===
Yuichiro "Idol" Odagiri (アイドル小田桐雄一郎, Aidoru Odagiri Yūichirō)
Voiced by: Mitsuaki Madono (Japanese); Oscar Redondo (European Spanish)
The deluded science teacher who believes that he is attractive simply because he is one of the youngest male teachers at Saki Girl's. Often the butt of many pranks by Eriko and her group, Himeji used to have a crush on him before she discovered how vain he is. Chapter 69 is told from his point of view, showing him to be far less vain and perverted than the girls believe him to be.
Root Hara (ルート原)
The desperate male math teacher of Saki Girl's. Constantly seen wearing an out-dated 1970s style leisure suit (which is later burned at a school bonfire), decidedly elected as "The teacher who most likely needs Viagra".
Kamei (ミス亀井)
Female Health Ed. teacher at Saki Girl's. A bitter older woman who always seems to have a scowl on her face. She dyes her hair black to cover her grays (even though hair dyeing is against the Saki Girl's rules).
Kaoru "Macho" Matsuo (マッチョ松尾薫, Macho Matsuo Kaoru)
Voiced by: Keijin Okuda (Japanese); Ramón Rocabayera (European Spanish)
The hairy, muscular, infallible P.E. teacher at Saki Girl's who has taken a liking to Eriko.
Hitler Iwato (ヒトラー岩戸)
Curiously named Head & classics teacher.
Takanori Shimotakatani (下高谷孝則, Shimotakatani Takanori)
Voiced by: Takahiro Mizushima (Japanese); Sergio Mesa (European Spanish)
Ayano's boyfriend whom she met at the "Meet the Boys" festival. Eriko and pals, as well as Ayano's mother and sister, are usually trying to get Ayano to lose her virginity to him, mostly without the couple's consent. He is a fan of Takeshi Kouda(Kouda's older brother) He has a glasses fetish.
Momoka Suzuki (鈴木桃香, Suzuki Momoka)
Voiced by: Ai Shimizu (Japanese); Mar Nicolas (European Spanish)
Yuma's delinquent, tsundere and near-evil younger sister, who harbors a hatred for Yuma and her friends, but later befriends Yuma's friends. She is often mistaken as a celebrity, and she uses to manipulate people and flirt with boys. The cause of her poor relationship is because Yuma always protect Momoka and she felt useless, so she refused to go to the same school that her sister, causing their bad relationship. It is later shown that although she claims to dislike her sister, Momoka truly loves her sister and misses her when Yuma is away on a trip, and vice versa. Momoka gets scared when the female bullies cuts a chunk out of her hair. In the end of episode 6, Momoka cuts her hair even shorter off-screen. Later, her sibling relation with Yuma gets better in the series, and finally she goes to her sister's high school, making their relationship good again.
Fumino Sato (佐藤史乃, Satō Fumino)
Voiced by: Eri Saito (Japanese); Susana Damas (European Spanish)
Ayano's attractive, unlucky in love older sister. It is somewhat hinted that she and Ayano had different fathers.
Taeko "Choko" Sato (佐藤蝶子, Satō Taeko)
Voiced by: Masako Isobe (Japanese); Esperança Domènech (European Spanish)
Ayano's unattractive mother, owner of Bar Choko. Also unlucky in love.
Takeshi Kouda (香田たけし, Kōda Takeshi)
Akari's elder brother, trying to make it big as a rock star. Unemployed and a womanizer, although he has been seen to occasionally date Ayano's sister Fumino.

=== Minor characters ===
Daichi Takahashi (高橋大地, Tajkahashi Daichi)
Voiced by: Hana Takeda (Japanese); Susana Damas (European Spanish)
Eriko's annoying little brother.
Mari Saionji (西園寺マリ, Saionji Mari)
Voiced by: Mikako Takahashi (Japanese); Mar Nicolas (European Spanish)
A blonde girl with whom Kouda shares a (now mostly forgotten) rivalry, which was put to an end during Sports Day.
Professor Nakagawa (マリオ中川, Mario Nakagawa; aka Mario)
The biology professor who looks a lot like Nintendo's mascot Mario.
Yurika Kinashi (木梨由利香, Kinashi Yurika; nee Suzuki)
Older sister to Yuma and Momoka, who is married. The Kinashi family visit the Suzukis in the 31st period (A Day With The Suzuki Family), published in the fourth volume of the manga. Although sweet to her husband Yuuya and their daughters, she often acts like a tyrant when it comes to Yuma and Momoka, trying to enforce her experiences as a full-time homemaker to them so they can be prepared for life after high school. It is something the younger Suzuki sisters are often intimidated by. Yurika went to all-girls schools as she was growing up. The Kinashis have two daughters, one preschooler and a newborn.
Yuuya Kinashi (木梨雄也, Kinashi Yuuya)
Yurika's husband and Yuma's and Momoka's brother-in-law.
Nao Koshiba (小柴菜緒, Koshiba Nao)
Voiced by: Megumi Matsumoto (Japanese); Susana Damas (European Spanish)

Nao is often depicted as akin to a perfect Takarazuka boy's actress (otokoyaku) and she was seen in the 52nd period (The Heroine Reaches To The Top Late) and in the class trip to Okinawa (from the 63rd period [The Moron Group Travels The Sky] onward) as doting over Sayaka. They also starred in several four-panel comics published in the sixth manga volume.

Sayaka Mouri (毛利さやか, Mōri Sayaka)
Voiced by: Ai Matayoshi (Japanese); Pilar Mora (European Spanish)

Sayaka is a person who prefers natural treatments to wounds and health care. In volume 9, Sayaka was shown to have missed a year of school due to being hospitalized for an extreme case of eczema (which is why she prefers to use only all natural products). Because of her missing a year, Sayaka is actually one year older than everyone else in the class, a secret that Nao keeps for her.

Miyoko Honda (本田美代子, Honda Miyoko)
Introduced in the 41st period, she was classified by Akari as being an "E" (or Plain Jane) type girl. During the trip in Okinawa, however, it is shown that Miyoko is actually quite pretty but is overlooked due to her association with the Freak group.
Miss Takagi (高木さん, Takagi-san) and Miss Toyoizumi (豊泉さん, Toyoizumi-san)
Introduced in the 41st period, they were classified by Akari as being "D" (or Freak) type girls. Along with Honda, Takagi and Toyoizumi share great passion in subjects such as anime, manga and games.
Arisa Ohnishiki (大錦ありさ, Ōnishiki Arisa)
Introduced in the 42nd period (Building Relationships With Other Groups), she is a "D" type girl who is said to have a great love of video games.
Miss Matsuyama (松山さん, Matsuyama-san)
First seen in the 52nd period (The Heroine Reaches To The Top Late) and named in the 59th period (Eriko Turns Dumb?), she is a "D" type girl who has a pinched, almost blank look on her face. Matsuyama tried to help Eriko study by comparing math equations to role playing games. Naturally, poor Eriko didn't understand a thing.
Riku Sotoike (外池陸, Sotoike Riku), Kai Akasaka (赤坂海, Akasaka Kai) and Rin Inukai (犬飼凛, Inukai Rin)
Introduced in the 41st period, they were classified by Akari as being "C" (or Funky-girl) type girls. Their main passion centres on things such as following the trends worn by those who frequent Tokyo's Harajuku district, plus expressing love of things such as indie bands, punk rock music, and used clothing. Akari believes that these girls would eventually become hairstylists or fashion designers.
Mitsuru Yamato (大和みつる, Yamato Mitsuru)
Introduced in the 41st period (her given name was first mentioned in the 55th period [Club Campaigning Tsunami {Reversed Flow}]), she is the captain of the school's volleyball team. Akari described her as a "B" type girl (specifically, a Club Enthusiast Girl); in other words, a sports fanatic.
Wakana Satomi (里見わかな, Satomi Wakana) and Honoka Inaba (稲葉ほのか, Inaba Honoka)
Also introduced with Mitsuru in the 41st period, Wakana and Honoka were also described by Akari as "B" type girls. Like Mitsuru, these ladies are also sports fanatics.
Haruna Nagakubo (長久保陽菜, Nagakubo Haruna) and Runa Hirota (広田瑠菜, Hirota Runa)
Introduced in the 41st period, they were classified by Akari as "A" (or Cool Girl) types. Both girls always project a trendy look, wear brand-name fashion items, most likely have part-time jobs, and attend gōkon (group blind date) parties. Akari believes both girls began to bloom after entering high school, which differentiates Haruna and Runa from the "S" type girls.
Nene Shiina (椎名音々, Shiina Nene) and Nana Sakurada (桜田奈々, Sakurada Nana)
Introduced in the 41st period, they were classified by Akari as "S" (the Outer or Charismatic Girl) types. Seen as extremely beautiful and charismatic since their junior high school days, Nene and Nana are seen as the trend-setters in the class. Nene also claims to have a DJ as a boyfriend. Akari believes their interests lie in things like boyfriends, working, outside-school clubs, friends, sex, and family. These two girls are also seen as being quite friendly to the "lower" ranked girls in class.
Towa Oshima (大島永遠, Oshima Towa)
The author herself. She has appeared in a story of Eriko's (and the omake manga at the end of the volume 1 manga), where she got acute inflammation of the intestine after drinking bad raw tea. She appears mainly as a parody of her real self: old sweatpants, stained shirts, and far too many panty peeks.

== Episodes ==
No.	Title	Original air date
1	"High School Girls Are Idiots"; Transliteration: "Mesukōsei wa Bakadearu." (Japanese: 女子高生はバカである。)	April 3, 2006
2	"Physical Exams... The Scent of a Woman's Shyness"; Transliteration: "Karada Kensa wa Otome no Hajirai no Kaori." (Japanese: 身体検査は乙女の恥じらいの薫り。)	April 10, 2006
3	"Love, Deception, and a Love Hotel?"; Transliteration: "Koishite, Damashite, Rabu Hoteru?" (Japanese: 恋して、ダマして、ラブホテル?)	April 17, 2006
4	"Hooray! We Still Wear Bloomers At Sakijo!"; Transliteration: "Iwai! Saki On'na wa Imadani Burumādesu." (Japanese: 祝!咲女はいまだにブルマーです。)	April 24, 2006
5	"Swimsuits, A Hot Girl, And A Macho Teacher"; Transliteration: "Mizugi to Bishōjo to Matchona Sensei." (Japanese: 水着と美少女とマッチョな先生。)	May 1, 2006
6	"Rift"; Transliteration: "Kiretsu." (Japanese: 亀裂。)	May 8, 2006
7	"A Terrible Example of the Consequences..."; Transliteration: "Machigatte Oshiego o Nanpa Suruto Taihen'na Koto ni Naru to iu Jitsurei." (Japanese: 間違って教え子をナンパすると大変なことになるという実例。)	May 15, 2006
8	"Long Ago, We Were Young Too"; Transliteration: "Uchi-ra mo Mukashi wa Wakakatta. ~Bakku Tou za Sūnenmae~" (Japanese: ウチらも昔は若かった。～バック・トゥ・ザ・数年前～)	May 22, 2006
9	"Farewell! Akari Kouda"; Transliteration: "Saraba! Kōda Akari." (Japanese: さらば! 香田あかり。)	May 29, 2006
10	"Glasses! Glasses! Glasses!"; Transliteration: "Megane! Megane! Megane!" (Japanese: メガネ! メガネ! メガネ!)	May 5, 2006
11	"Tales of Tragic Love At Sakijo"; Transliteration: "Saki jo Hiren Tan. ~Omoi, Saigetsu o Koete~" (Japanese: 咲女悲恋譚。～想い、歳月を超えて～)	June 12, 2006
12	"Stupidity, Never Ending Stupidity"; Transliteration: "Baka, Hateshinaku Baka." (Japanese: バカ、果てしなくバカ。)	June 19, 2006

== Music ==
Opening theme
Kirameku performed by yozuca
Ending theme
incl. performed by meg rock

== ISBN ==
English translations published by ComicsOne

- Volume 1: ISBN 1-58899-200-4
- Volume 2: ISBN 1-58899-201-2

English translations published by Dr. Master Productions Inc.

- Volume 3: ISBN 1-58899-202-0
- Volume 4: ISBN 1-59796-084-5
- Volume 5: ISBN 1-59796-058-6
- Volume 6: ISBN 1-59796-059-4
- Volume 7: ISBN 1-59796-051-9
- Volume 8: ISBN 1-59796-052-7
- Volume 9: ISBN 1-59796-005-5 (28 March 2008)
