= I Had That Same Dream Again =

Japanese novel

- Cover of the volume

また、同じ夢を見ていた (Mata, Onaji Yume o Mite Ita)
- Genre: Drama, Slice of life
- Novel
- Written by: Yoru Sumino
- Illustrated by: loundraw
- Published by: Futabasha
- English publisher: NA: Seven Seas Entertainment
- Published: February 19, 2016
- Manga
- Written by: Yoru Sumino
- Illustrated by: Idumi Kirihara
- Published by: Futabasha
- English publisher: NA: Seven Seas Entertainment
- Magazine: Monthly Action
- Original run: September 23, 2017 – August 25, 2018
- Volumes: 3

I Had That Same Dream Again (Japanese: また、同じ夢を見ていた, Hepburn: Mata, Onaji Yume o Mite Ita) is a Japanese novel written by Yoru Sumino and illustrated by loundraw. A manga adaptation, illustrated by Idumi Kirihara, was serialized in Futabasha's Monthly Action from September 2017 to August 2018.

== Plot ==
The plot follows a grade schooler, Nanoka Koyanagi, after she is assigned at school to define what happiness means to her. She meets three strangers – an isolated woman living alone, known to Nanoka as Skank-san, an unhappy teenage girl who self-harms, Minami, and an old woman, known to Nanoka as Granny, and uses her experiences with them to define what happiness means to her.

== Media ==
=== Novel ===
The novel is written by Yoru Sumino and illustrated by loundraw. Futabasha published the volume on February 19, 2016.

On October 23, 2019, Seven Seas Entertainment announced they licensed the series for English publication. They released the volume on March 12, 2020, digitally and on July 7, 2020, in print.

=== Manga ===
A manga adaptation, illustrated by Idumi Kirihara, started serialization in Monthly Action on September 23, 2017. The series finished serialization in Monthly Action on August 25, 2018. The series was published in three tankōbon volumes.

Seven Seas Entertainment is also publishing the manga adaptation in English. They published all three volumes as one omnibus volume.

==== Volume list ====
No.	Original release date	Original ISBN	English release date	English ISBN
1	March 12, 2018	978-4-57-585118-2	July 7, 2020	978-1-64-505491-7
2	July 12, 2018	978-4-57-585184-7	July 7, 2020	978-4-57-585184-7
3	September 12, 2018	978-4-57-585216-5	July 7, 2020	978-4-57-585184-7

== Reception ==
Demelza of Anime UK News praised the novel, calling it a "compelling read from start to finish".

Rebecca Silverman of Anime News Network praised the manga adaptation for both its story and characters, while calling it a bit predictable at times. Danica Davidson from Otaku USA recommended the series, stating it was "carefully plotted and well stated".

The manga adaptation was nominated for the Eisner Award for Best U.S. Edition of International Material—Asia in 2021.
