= Galette (magazine) =

Japanese manga magazine

- Cover of the February 2017 issue of Galette
- Categories: Yuri manga
- Frequency: Quarterly
- Publisher: Galette Works
- First issue: February 19, 2017
- Country: Japan
- Language: Japanese
- Website: galetteweb.com

Galette (Japanese: ガレット) is an independent Japanese yuri manga magazine published quarterly to coincide with Comitia doujin events in the Kanto region. It was first announced in December 2016 that the magazine would be funded through Enty, a membership platform, and released digitally and physically. The first issues was published on February 19, 2017.

On August 3, 2024, Galette launched crowdfunding campaign on Kickstarter for an English edition of the magazine. The campaign exceeds its funding goal of ¥1,800,000, ending with ¥7,090,980 from 637 backers.

== Authors ==
- Asube Yui
- Amano Shuninta
- Ootomo Megane
- Uno Jinia
- Izumi Kitta + Momono Moto (Liberty)
- Sugata Uri
- Takemiya Jin
- Hakamada Mera
- Milk Morinaga (My Cute Little Kitten)
- Hamano Ringo (Cotton Candy)
- Yatosaki Haru
- Furiko Yotsuhara
- Yorita Miyuki
- Akiko Morishima (Motto Hanjuku Joshi)
