= Milk Morinaga =

Japanese manga artist

Milk Morinaga 森永みるく
- Born: Tokyo, Japan
- Area: Manga artist

Milk Morinaga (森永 みるく, Morinaga Miruku) is a Japanese manga artist. Her works have been published in Yuri Shimai, Comic Yuri Hime, Comic Hot Milk, and other yuri and adult manga magazines. She made her professional debut as an illustrator for Cobalt Bunko, a shōjo novel imprint from Shueisha.

Her pen name comes from the Japanese company Morinaga Milk Industry.

== Works ==
Title	Year	Notes	Refs
Study After School	1997	Published by Hot Milk Comics. anthology series, 2 volumes republished in 2001–2003	
Nikurashii Anata e (にくらしいあなたへ, To Odious You)	2000		ISBN 978-4-89829-414-7
Milk Shell (ミルクシェル)	2002	Published by Hot Milk Comics, 1 volumes	
Mea (メア, Mare)	2003		ISBN 978-4-89829-944-9
Kuchibiru Tameiki Sakurairo	2003–2012	Anthology of Morinaga's one-shots Serialized in Yuri Shimai, Comic Yuri Hime, and Comic High! magazines Published by Futabasha in 2 volumes	
Amai Kuchibiru (あまいくちびる, Sweet Lips)	2003	anthology series	
Girl Friends	2006–2010	Serialized in Comic High! magazine Published by Futabasha in 5 volumes	
Himitsu no Recipe	2009–2013	Serialized in Tsubomi and later in Tsubomi Web; Published by Houbunsha in 2 volumes	
Gakuen Polizi	2012–2014	Serialized in Comic High! magazine Published by Futabasha in 2 volumes	
Secret of the Princess	2015	Published in Hirari Comics, 1 volume	
Hana to Hina wa Hōkago (ハナとヒナは放課後, Hana and Hina after school)	2015–2016	Serialized in Comic High! and Monthly Action magazines Published by Futabasha	
Tsubomi amakute yasashī, Yuri ansorojī (つぼみあまくてやさしい、百合アンソロジー, Friendly and sweet bud, yuri anthology)		Anthology with multiple authors published in Manga Time Comics in 10 volumes	
My Cute Little Kitten	2017	Serialized in Galette; Published by Brick Publishing	
Yuri Drill (百合ドリル)	2018	Anthology series published by Kadokawa Future Publishing in 5 volumes	ISBN 9784040697857

=== Games ===
- Marine Rouge (マリンルージュ, Marin Rūju) (PC-98/Windows, original design work)
