= Secret of the Princess =

Japanese manga series

- First tankōbon volume cover

お姫様のひみつ (Ohime-sama no Himitsu)
- Genre: Romance; Yuri
- Manga
- Written by: Milk Morinaga
- Published by: Shinshokan
- English publisher: NA: Seven Seas Entertainment
- Magazine: Hirari; Web Magazine Wings
- Original run: November 30, 2012 – January 28, 2015
- Volumes: 1

Secret of the Princess (Japanese: お姫様のひみつ, Hepburn: Ohime-sama no Himitsu) is a Japanese yuri manga series written and illustrated by Milk Morinaga. It was published in Shinshokan's Hirari from November 30, 2012, till the magazines discontinuation on July 30, 2014, after which it continued in Web Magazine Wings to January 28, 2015. It was collected into a single tankōbon volume in 2015 and was licensed for an English-language release by Seven Seas Entertainment in 2016.

== Synopsis ==
After witnessing the school's volleyball club superstar, Fujiwara, damage the costly vase belonging to the principal, Miu asks for Fujiwara to be her practice prince in exchange for keeping quiet. As the two begin to practice dating, Miu finds herself attracted to her senpai's unexpected frankness, but by this point, it may too late to express her true feelings.

== Publication ==
Written and illustrated by Milk Morinaga, Secret of the Princess was first serialized in Shinshokan's Hirari from November 30, 2012, to July 30, 2014, after continued serialization in Web Magazine Wings to January 28, 2015. The series was collected into a tankōbon volume on May 30, 2015.

The series is licensed for an English release in North America by Seven Seas Entertainment.

No.	Original release date	Original ISBN	English release date	English ISBN
1	May 30, 2015	978-4-403621-97-0	February 14, 2017	978-1-626924-69-7

== Reception ==
Rebecca Silverman of Anime News Network gave Secret of the Princess an overall A− rating; noting its similarities to Morinaga's other works but remarked "if you've never read any yuri and find yourself curious, this makes for a very sweet and reassuring introduction to the genre." Erica Friedman gave the series an overall positive review, summarising that "despite the fairly obvious path the narrative takes, it's not a terrible story. Miu, who might easily have been exceptionally unlikable, changes considerably during the course of the story and Fujiwara, who begins the book as a cipher, ends up equally as sympathetic."
