= Kase-san =

Yuri manga by Hiromi Takashima and its franchise

- Cover of the first manga volume featuring Yui Yamada (left) and Tomoka Kase (right).

加瀬さん
- Genre: Romance, yuri
- Manga
- Written by: Hiromi Takashima
- Published by: Shinshokan
- English publisher: Seven Seas Entertainment
- Magazine: Hirari; Flash Wings
- Original run: August 26, 2010 – March 23, 2017
- Volumes: 5
- Manga

Kase-san and Yamada
- Written by: Hiromi Takashima
- Published by: Shinshokan
- English publisher: Seven Seas Entertainment
- Magazine: Wings
- Original run: April 28, 2017 – present
- Volumes: 5
- Original net animation

Your Light ~Kase-san and Morning Glories~
- Directed by: Takuya Satō
- Music by: Hanako Oku
- Studio: Zexcs
- Released: May 7, 2017
- Runtime: 5 minutes
- Original video animation

Kase-san and Morning Glories
- Directed by: Takuya Satō
- Produced by: Gouta Aijima; Yuusuke Terada; Masayo Kudou; Fumiaki Kumagai
- Written by: Takuya Satō
- Music by: rionos
- Studio: Zexcs
- Licensed by: NA: Sentai Filmworks
- Released: June 9, 2018 (theatrical)
- Runtime: 58 minutes

Kase-san (Japanese: 加瀬さん) is a Japanese yuri manga series written and illustrated by Hiromi Takashima. The series was serialized in Shinshokan's Hirari magazine and Flash Wings web publication between August 2010 and March 2017 and is published in English by Seven Seas Entertainment. A sequel series, titled Kase-san and Yamada (山田と加瀬さん。, Yamada to Kase-san), began publication in the shōjo manga magazine Wings in April 2017. A five-minute original net animation by Zexcs was released on May 7, 2017, followed by a 58-minute original video animation released in theaters on June 9, 2018.

== Story ==
Yui Yamada, a timid girl who enjoys tending to her school's garden, falls in love with the athletic Tomoka Kase. The two eventually begin dating, and the story follows the pair as they face various challenges in their relationship.

== Characters ==
Yui Yamada (山田 結衣, Yamada Yui)
Voiced by: Minami Takahashi (Japanese); Bryn Apprill (English)
A shy and timid girl who is part of her school's greenery committee and loves weeding the school grounds. She falls in love with Kase and soon begins dating her, although she often gets paranoid over things. After graduating from high school, she goes to Tokyo with Kase to study horticulture at a women's university.
Tomoka Kase (加瀬 友香, Kase Tomoka)
Voiced by: Ayane Sakura (Japanese); Morgan Berry (English)
A boyish looking girl who is part of her school's track and field club and has exceedingly good athletic skill, often racing in tournaments. She takes an interest in Yamada and soon starts dating her, although she can sometimes act a little perverted. After graduating from high school, she goes to a sport university in Tokyo.
Mikawa (三河)
Voiced by: Ibuki Kido (Japanese); Apphia Yu (English)
Yamada's best friend, nicknamed Mikawacchi, who is initially suspicious of her relationship with Kase, having heard various rumors about her. She is quite boisterous but can't stand the sight of blood. After graduation, she goes to a college in Tokyo to study tourism.
Akane Inoue (井上 茜, Inoue Akane)
Voiced by: Minako Kotobuki
A graduate who was in the same track club as Kase and attends the same university Kase later attends. As a result of rumors, she is long believed by Yamada to be Kase's ex-girlfriend, although this is eventually proven to be false.

== Media ==
=== Manga ===
The original manga by Hiromi Takashima began publication in the second issue of Shinshokan's Hirari magazine from August 26, 2010. After Hirari ceased publication in 2014, the series moved to Shinshokan's Flash Wings web publication and ran until March 23, 2017. Five tankōbon volumes have been released in Japan as of May 20, 2018. Seven Seas Entertainment licensed the series in English and released the first volume in North America on February 28, 2017. A sequel series, titled Kase-san and Yamada, began serialization in Shinshokan's Wings magazine from April 28, 2017.

No.	Title	Original release date	English release date
01	Kase-san and Morning Glories; Asagao to Kase-san. (あさがおと加瀬さん。)	July 28, 2012; 978-4-40-367121-0	February 28, 2017; 978-1-62-692470-3
02	Kase-san and Bento; Obentō to Kase-san. (おべんとうと加瀬さん。)	July 30, 2014; 978-4-40-367158-6	May 23, 2017; 978-1-62-692487-1
03	Kase-san and Shortcake; Shōtokēki to Kase-san. (ショートケーキと加瀬さん。)	September 30, 2015; 978-4-40-367173-9	September 12, 2017; 978-1-62-692549-6
04	Kase-san and an Apron; Epuron to Kase-san. (エプロンと加瀬さん。)	July 25, 2017; 978-4-40-367176-0	February 20, 2018; 978-1-62-692743-8
05	Kase-san and Cherry Blossoms; Sakura to Kase-san. (さくらと加瀬さん。)	May 20, 2018; 978-4-40-367178-4	February 12, 2019; 978-1-64-275054-6
06	Kase-san and Yamada -1- Yamada to Kase-san. 1 (山田と加瀬さん。-1-)	July 25, 2019; 978-4-40-367181-4	February 11, 2020; 978-1-62-692959-3
07	Kase-san and Yamada -2- Yamada to Kase-san. 2 (山田と加瀬さん。-2-)	November 25, 2020; 978-4-40-367182-1	February 8, 2022; 978-1-64-827937-9
08	Kase-san and Yamada -3- Yamada to Kase-san. 3 (山田と加瀬さん。-3-)	June 25, 2022; 978-4-40-367187-6	April 16, 2024; 978-1-63858-269-4
09	Kase-san and Yamada -4- Yamada to Kase-san. 4 (山田と加瀬さん。-4-)	April 26, 2024; 978-4-40-367187-6	April 15, 2025; 979-8-89373-153-8
10	Kase-san and Yamada -5- Yamada to Kase-san. 5 (山田と加瀬さん。-5-)	December 26, 2025; 978-4-40-367194-4	September 22, 2026; 979-8-89765-343-0

=== Anime ===
A five-minute animation clip based on the series was announced on March 23, 2017. The clip, titled Your Light ~Kase-san and Morning Glories~ (キミノヒカリ ～あさがおと加瀬さん。～, Kimi no Hikari ~Asagao to Kase-san.~), was released on Pony Canyon's YouTube channel on May 7, 2017. It was directed by Takuya Satō at Zexcs with character design and key animation by Kyuta Sakai, and features the song "Kimi no Egao (album ver.)" (君の笑顔 (album ver.), Your Smile (album ver.)) from Hanako Oku's 2012 album, Good-Bye. A Blu-ray Disc of the clip containing a storyboard reel and audio commentary was bundled with the special edition of Kase-san and Apron on July 25, 2017. A new anime project was announced on August 28, 2017, later revealed to be an original video animation that was scheduled for release in Summer 2018, also produced by Zexcs. Satō and Sakai return as director and character designer respectively, while Takeshi Kuchiba will be doing composition. The 58-minute OVA was screened in theaters from June 9, 2018. The main theme is a cover of I WiSH's 2003 song "Asu e no Tobira" (明日への扉, Door Towards Tomorrow), performed by Minami Takahashi and Ayane Sakura. The OVA had its North American premiere at Anime Expo 2018 on July 8, 2018. Sentai Filmworks licensed the OVA and released it on Blu-ray with an English dub on October 22, 2019, in North America.

No.	Title	Original release date
OVA	"Kase-san and Morning Glories"; Transliteration: "Asagao to Kase-san." (Japanese: あさがおと加瀬さん。)	June 9, 2018
Plant appointee Yui Yamada and athlete Tomoka Kase have recently started dating each other. As Yamada becomes anxious when she is unable to spend time with Kase, Kase explains how she came to admire her. Later, Yamada invites Kase to her house, where a serious development almost takes place. During a school trip to Okinawa, Yamada becomes embarrassed when she sees Kase naked, leading Kase to worry that she wants to break up with her, but they manage to clear up their worries the next day. Later, as Kase is set to go to a sports university in Tokyo, Yamada, realizing she doesn't want to be apart from Kase, decides to change her choice of university to one in Tokyo so she can be with her.

=== Drama CDs ===
Three drama CDs were produced, featuring the same voice cast from the OVA. The first was bundled with special editions of the fifth manga volume released on May 20, 2018. A second drama CD was included as part of a Cover Song & Audio Drama Album released on June 6, 2018. A third drama CD was exclusively distributed to special ticket holders for the screening of the OVA on June 9, 2018.
