= Hitohira =

Japanese manga series by Izumi Kirihara

- First volume cover

ひとひら
- Genre: Comedy
- Manga
- Written by: Izumi Kirihara
- Published by: Futabasha
- English publisher: NA: Aurora Publishing; JManga
- Magazine: Comic High!
- Original run: March 22, 2004 – May 22, 2009
- Volumes: 7
- Anime television series
- Directed by: Akira Nishimori
- Written by: Megumu Sasano
- Music by: Conisch
- Studio: Xebec M2
- Original run: March 28, 2007 – June 13, 2007
- Episodes: 12
- Manga

Hitohira Encore
- Written by: Izumi Kirihara
- Published by: Futabasha
- Magazine: Comic High!
- Original run: July 22, 2009 – January 22, 2010
- Volumes: 1
- icon

Hitohira (ひとひら; lit. 'Petal') is a Japanese manga series written and illustrated by Izumi Kirihara. The story revolves around a shy girl named Mugi Asai who is unsure of what club to join in her school, but before she knows it she gets dragged into the Drama Research Society and becomes a member. The manga was serialized in Futabasha's seinen manga magazine Comic High! from March 2004 to May 2009. The manga was licensed for distribution in North America by Aurora Publishing. A 12-episode anime adaptation aired in Japan between March and June 2007.

== Plot ==
Hitohira revolves around a group of young high school students, the primary characters of which are either in the Drama Club or in the much smaller Drama Research Society. At the center is the main heroine Mugi Asai, a shy girl entering her first year of high school. Early in the year, Mugi is unsure on what clubs she should join, but is soon spotted by the Drama Research Society's president Nono Ichinose after she hears Mugi's astonishingly loud voice. Nono pressures Mugi into joining the club and eventually Mugi buckles under the pressure and joins. At first Mugi did not think it was going to be so bad, but she eventually learns that the Drama Research Society is going to put on two plays this year, and Mugi must act in both plays in several roles due to the low number of club members. Over time, Mugi's personality changes due to the club members' influence on her.

== Characters ==
=== Drama Research Society ===
Mugi Asai (麻井麦, Asai Mugi)
Voiced by: Orie Kimoto
Mugi is the main character in Hitohira. She is a very shy girl who has low self-esteem and will often says things are "impossible" if she thinks they are too much for her to handle. Despite being terrified about being the center of attention, she gets unwillingly drafted into the Drama Research Society but stays after she discovers the determination from the three older members of the club. Mugi especially admires Nono's determination after learning about her affliction with her vocal cords. When Mugi starts to panic, Nono can easily calm her down enough for her to carry out her acting duties. When stressed, or sometimes merely by chance, Mugi is submerged in delusions when she imagines herself in strange scenarios.
Nono Ichinose (一ノ瀬野乃, Ichinose Nono)
Voiced by: Ayako Kawasumi
Nono is the president of the Drama Research Society. She usually has a calm personality and her expression does not change much. When angered, however, she becomes very intimidating and has been known to be unstoppable when in this state of mind. Nono has an outward rivalry with the Drama Club president Mirei Sakaki and whenever the two of them meet they are sure to argue. Nono has a latent form of vocal cord paralysis and if she overexerts her voice too much, she may lose it at a young age. Nono was once a member of the Drama Society but later formed the Drama Research Society with Takashi and Risaki because she still wanted to act, which went against the wishes of Mirei.
Takashi Katsuragi (桂木たかし, Katsuragi Takashi)
Voiced by: Ken Narita
Takashi is one of the three founding members of the Drama Research Society. He has a personality which could be described as cool, and has a strong determination regarding drama and acting. Chitose Kanna of the Drama Club has a crush on him and often attends Drama Research Society meetings to get a chance to be closer to him. Takashi is very smart; he got twenty-fifth place in the mid-term exams for his school early on in the story. He admits on having a crush on Nono to Chitose when she confesses her feelings for him.
Risaki Nishida (西田理咲, Nishida Risaki)
Voiced by: Kyoko Hikami
Risaki is the third founding member of the Drama Research Society. She has a tough personality which she often uses to get her younger brother Kai to do what she wants for the sake of the club. She is not afraid to show force when needed, but has been shown to be terrified of Nono when she is angered.
Kai Nishida (西田甲斐, Nishida Kai)
Voiced by: Daisuke Kishio
Kai is Risaki's younger brother and the last member of the Drama Research Society. He was drafted against his will by his sister at the same time Mugi joined. Thus, the two of them share an odd friendship since both do not really want to be members of the club. Later on, he gradually develops romantic feelings towards her. Kai often gets forced by his sister to do things for the club at the expense of himself.

=== Drama Club ===
Mirei Sakaki (榊美麗, Sakaki Mirei)
Voiced by: Satsuki Yukino
Mirei is the president of the Drama Club. She has a serious personality and is able to forcefully command the other members of her club. She has an ongoing rivalry with Nono despite being close friends back when they first met a couple of years ago. Mirei initially brought Nono into the Drama Club after she saw Nono constantly reading alone. She might also have romantic feelings for Nono, as Takashi has hinted after being rejected by Nono for offering to share his umbrella with her. Although she does not show it much, she worries about Nono due to Nono's health problems. She had tried to stop Nono from using her voice as an actress by not letting her act in a play, but failed.
Chitose Kanna (神奈ちとせ, Kanna Chitose)
Voiced by: Emi Yabusaki
Chitose is a first year student and new member to the Drama Club. She has an outgoing personality and has been told she is very bold in her actions. Despite being a member of the Drama Club, she often helps the Drama Research Society with small tasks and will motivate Mugi when need be. Chitose has a crush on Takashi and will cheer for him during practices. She gave Mugi the nickname "Mugi-choco" and is herself nicknamed "Orinal" by Kayo. After her confession to Takashi, she remains cheerful as usual despite being rejected.
Haruko Tamaki (玉城春子, Tamaki Haruko)
Voiced by: Kana Ueda
Sachie Ayase (綾瀬幸枝, Ayase Sachie)
Voiced by: Ayumi Tsunematsu
Shinji Kino (木野信二, Kino Shinji)
Hibiki Kawasaki (川崎響, Kawasaki Hibiki)
Voiced by: Akiko Tanaka
Minoru Yamaguchi (山口実, Yamaguchi Minoru)
Sadaji Wakui (和久井貞冶, Wakui Sadaji)
Voiced by: Jin Domon

=== Other characters ===
Kayo Tōyama (遠山佳代, Tōyama Kayo)
Voiced by: Miho Miyagawa
Kayo is Mugi's friend that she has known since junior-high school. She is often encouraging Mugi to have more confidence and tries to give her motivation during practice sessions held by the Drama Research Society. Kayo has a love of photography and is a member of the Photography Club; she likes to take pictures of Mugi and the other members of the Drama Research Society. After finishing her first year with Mugi, she leaves Japan to study photography overseas.
Kyōsuke Takeda (武田京介, Takeda Kyōsuke)

== Media ==
=== Manga ===
The Hitohira manga series, written and illustrated by Izumi Kirihara, was serialized in Futabasha's seinen manga magazine Comic High! between March 22, 2004, and May 22, 2009. Seven bound volumes were released in Japan. The manga has been licensed for distribution in North America by Aurora Publishing. The first three volumes were released between October 2008 and February 2009. A side-story spin-off manga titled Hitohira Encore (ひとひらアンコール) was serialized in Comic High! between July 22, 2009, and January 22, 2010. A single volume for Encore was published on April 12, 2010.

=== Anime ===
The anime series is produced by the animation studio Xebec M2, written by Megumu Sasano, and directed by Akira Nishimori. The series contains twelve episodes which aired between March 28, 2007, and June 13, 2007. The opening and ending theme maxi single entitled Yume, Hitohira was released on April 25, 2007, by Media Factory. The single contained the opening theme "Yume, Hitohira" (夢、ひとひら) by Yūko Asami, and the ending theme "Smile" (スマイル, Sumairu) by Mai Mizuhashi. The first original soundtrack entitled Hitohira Drama & BGM Mugi Asai was released on May 30, 2007, by Media Factory containing background music tracks along with a set of tracks akin to a drama CD. The second soundtrack entitled Hitohira Drama & BGM Nono Ichinose was released on June 27, 2007, also by Media Factory.
