= Hanjuku-Joshi =

Japanese manga series

- First tankōbon volume cover

半熟女子
- Genre: Romance, yuri
- Manga
- Written by: Akiko Morishima
- Published by: Ichijinsha
- English publisher: JManga
- Magazine: Comic Yuri Hime
- Original run: October 18, 2008 – August 18, 2009
- Volumes: 2
- Manga

Motto Hanjuku Joshi
- Written by: Akiko Morishima
- Published by: Galette Works
- Magazine: Galette
- Original run: 2017 – 2021

Hanjuku-Joshi (半熟女子; "Half-ripe Girls") is a Japanese yuri romance manga series written and illustrated by Akiko Morishima. It was serialized in Ichijinsha's Comic Yuri Hime magazine from October 2008 to August 2009. It was licensed for an English-language release digitally by JManga.

== Plot ==
Having transferred to Momoyama Girls' High School, Yae Sakura, who has a complex about her femininity, meets Chitose Hayami, her complete opposite. After spending some time together, the girls began to have romantic and intimate feelings for each other. Meanwhile, the third-year student Mari Hanashima pursues Ran Edogawa, an English teacher at Momoyama High.

== Characters ==
Chitose Hayami (早水ちとせ, Hayami Chitose)
A first year student. Chitose is a confident girl with a boyish character and great fortitude. She is very good at sports. She lives with her five sisters, one of whom, Chie, is a mangaka and otaku of the yuri and yaoi genres. She fell in love with Yae, after which she started dating her.
Yae Sakura (佐倉八重, Sakura Yae)
A first year student. A kind and sweet girl, at the beginning of the story she had a complex about her femininity, but after meeting Chitose she stopped being ashamed of herself. She is a member of a sewing club and a cooking club. Throughout the story, she falls in love with Chitose and starts dating her.
Mari Hanashima (花島マリ, Hanashima Mari)
A senior student and the most popular girl in school. She is a member of the English language club. She is in love with Ran, whom she is dating.
Ran Edogawa (江戸川蘭, Edogawa Ran)
A teacher and president of the English language club. After breaking up with my first love, she was depressed for a long time. After meeting Mari, she fell in love with her and started dating her.

== Publication ==
Written and illustrated by Akiko Morishima, Hanjuku-Joshi was serialized in Ichijinsha's Comic Yuri Hime from October 18, 2008, to August 18, 2009. The series' chapters were collected in two tankōbon volumes.

It was released online in English by JManga and it is published in French by Taïfu Comics.

No.	Release date	ISBN
1	October 18 2008	9784758070348
2	August 18, 2009	9784758070591

== Reception ==
Erica Friedman gave both volumes an overall rating of 9 and said it "turned out to be a pretty interesting series". Two of the staff at Manga Sanctuary gave it an averaged rating of 6.5 out of 10. On AnimeLand, the staff gave both volumes a rating of "interesting".
