= Potemayo =

2007 television anime

- Potemayo manga volume 1.

ぽてまよ
- Genre: Comedy
- Manga
- Written by: Haruka Ogataya
- Published by: Futabasha
- Magazine: Moeyon, Comic High!
- Original run: July 9, 2004 – January 22, 2011
- Volumes: 5
- Anime television series
- Directed by: Takashi Ikehata
- Produced by: Yuta Todoroki; Ichigo Nonakai; Yuka Sakurai; Yuji Matsumura; Tetsuro Satomi
- Written by: Yuta Ikemi
- Music by: Tomoki Kikuya
- Studio: J.C.Staff
- Original network: Tokyo MX, Chiba TV, TV Kanagawa, Teletama, KBS Kyoto, SUN-TV, Mētele, AT-X
- Original run: July 6, 2007 – September 21, 2007
- Episodes: 12 + 6 Specials

Potemayo (ぽてまよ) is a Japanese four-panel comic strip by Haruka Ogataya. The manga was first serialized in the four-panel manga magazine Moeyon in July 2004. In October 2005, the manga moved to the Japanese seinen manga magazine Comic High! and continued until January 2011. A 12-episode anime adaptation by J.C.Staff aired between July and September 2007 on Tokyo MX.

== Plot ==
One morning Sunao Moriyama, a male junior high student, finds a small, cute creature in his refrigerator. During breakfast, Sunao looks down at what he is eating, a bun with potato and mayonnaise filling, and decided to name the creature Potemayo. Sunao takes Potemayo to school with him and she is an instant hit with his classmates, especially the girls. While they are at school, another similar creature comes out of Sunao's refrigerator and makes its way to a park where Sunao and his class are spending an art class. Kyō Takamimori, one of Sunao's classmates, finds the creature and names her Guchuko. Unlike Potemayo, Guchuko is aggressively antisocial and shoots searing energy beams out of horns on the sides of her head when she is confronted.

== Characters ==
Sunao Moriyama (森山 素直, Moriyama Sunao)
Voiced by: Eri Kitamura
Sunao is a male junior high school student who has a very serious attitude and shows little emotion. He was the one to find and name Potemayo, and she is very attached to him. He does his best to look after Potemayo, taking her to school with him each day. Sunao's mother died when he was younger, and since his father is almost never home, Sunao has become very self-sufficient. A running gag with Sunao is his horrible eyesight when he does not have his glasses.
Potemayo (ぽてまよ)
Voiced by: Kana Hanazawa
Potemayo is a mysterious creature that appeared one day in Sunao's refrigerator. The name Potemayo comes from first two characters of potato (ポテト, poteto) and mayonnaise (マヨネーズ, mayonēzu)—what Sunao was eating at the time. At first, she could not say anything but "honi", a nonsense phrase which she often utters even after learning how to say a few words like Sunao's name. Potemayo is very protective of Sunao, and if anyone tries to get close to him, she will growl and attack until they back off. When taken around with Sunao, she rides around on his head. She has the personality of a young child around two or three years of age, but has a super deformed body, complete with cat ears on her head and a fluffy, round tail. Potemayo will fly into a jealous rage when Mikan tries to get close to Sunao. Potemayo is also telepathic, at least when others are thinking about her Sunao, and becomes violent when she "hears" Mikan even thinking about Sunao. While Potemayo dislikes Mikan, she adores Yasumi (Mikan's younger brother), much to his annoyance. A small chick named Tori (とり; lit. 'bird') hangs around Potemayo and will often sit on her head. A running gag with Tori is that it will often eat things made with eggs or chicken, making Sunao call it a cannibal.
Guchuko (ぐちゅ子)
Voiced by: Ayumi Tsuji
Guchuko is another mysterious creature that appeared in Sunao's refrigerator, and is somewhat similar to Potemayo in appearance. Guchuko is named by Kyō Takamimori shortly after she ran into Guchuko at school. The name Guchuko is derived from a small chocolate ball called a guchu which Guchuko likes to eat, and -ko (子) added at the end, since it is a common ending for female given names in Japan. Guchuko carries a unique scythe (which looks somewhat like an axe) with a skull on it, and can fire strong energy beams from two living horns (or possibly worms) on either side of her head. She has a very self-sufficient personality, and has only partially warmed up to Kyō, who often gives Guchuko food when at school or at home; Guchuko often repays Kyō by putting pig or cow carcasses in front of her house. It is strongly hinted Guchuko has a crush on Kyō (similar to Potemayo's on Sunao) as she continually blushes around Kyō and once attacked Potemayo who was about to be fed one of Kyō's snacks out of jealously. Guchuko sleeps in a tree right outside Kyō's house, and she has the habit of breaking doors with her scythe to go through (and patch them up afterward) instead of using them normally.

Potemayo cast (from left to right): Background: Kyō's mother, Kyō, Yasumi, Kaoru, and Kōdai; Foreground: Guchuko, Nene, Mikan, Sunao, Potemayo (center), and Mudō.

Mikan Natsu (夏 みかん, Natsu Mikan)
Voiced by: Ayako Kawasumi
Mikan is one of Sunao's classmates; she has a huge crush on him, but due to her soft-spoken personality, she does not find it easy to convey her feelings of love. Mikan will often have outrageous fantasies involving her and Sunao in a relationship together, which causes her to space out entirely.
Kyō Takamimori (高見盛 京, Takamimori Kyō)
Voiced by: Yūko Kaida
Kyō is another one of Sunao's classmates, and is Mikan's close friend. She has a tomboyish personality, and is athletic. She is also an excellent cook, especially of sweets, and has become involved with Guchuko as a result. Kyō's mother frequently tries to convince Guchuko to stay in their house, with usually bad results. Kyō has been the only person who has ever been able to hold Guchuko; this was once when she helped Guchuko get out of a bush and another when she believed Guchuko had died.
Nene Kasugano (春日乃 ねね, Kasugano Nene)
Voiced by: Rie Kugimiya
Nene is a girl in Sunao's class, and is a close friend to Mikan. She normally has a high-pitched voice, but has been shown to alter her voice if she is impersonating another person's voice. She has a straight-forward personality, and is not afraid to say anything that is on her mind. Nene is very rich and has three older brothers who unilaterally adore her, though they often get her fist in their face. Nene's mother looks very young for her age (apparently it runs in their family), but she too often receives Nene's fist.
Mudō Kirihara (桐原 無道, Kirihara Mudō)
Voiced by: Hikaru Tokita
Mudō is a boy in Sunao's class. He took an early liking towards Potemayo, though has not been able to even pet Potemayo. On Valentine's Day in his second year of junior high school, he accidentally gave chocolate to Nene, which later caused him to become her slave for a time. Mudō is in the cheerleading club, and will dress up in a full female cheerleader uniform during club activities. A running gag is Mudō getting severely hurt, in many cases by the exploits of Guchuko. He seems to thinks Nene is cute when she does not talk at all.
Kaoru Hatsushiba (初芝 薫, Hatsushiba Kaoru)
Voiced by: Takayuki Kondo
Kaoru is a boy in Sunao's class, and is a close friend to Mudō. Kaoru has shown obvious attraction towards Mudō and will support Mudō in his endeavors to get closer to Potemayo.
Kōdai Moriyama (森山 皇大, Moriyama Kōdai)
Voiced by: Kenji Hamada
Kōdai is Sunao's father, and is a folklorist. He has a childish personality and likes to play around constantly, which causes his son to not take him seriously in any situation. Kōdai is almost always away on travel, something Sunao resents him for. Often, Kōdai is beaten by Sunao for his immature behavior. He refers to Potemayo as "Mochi-Mochi".
Yasumi Natsu (夏 哉純, Natsu Yasumi)
Voiced by: Nobuhiko Okamoto
Yasumi is the younger brother of Mikan, though is much taller than her and looks older than most boys his age. Due to his sister's infatuation with Sunao, Yasumi is annoyed at his sister's personality when around Sunao and will often break up any chance for Mikan to have some time alone with Sunao. It is also hinted that he has an attraction to his sister. His name is a pun on the Japanese word natsuyasumi (夏休み; meaning "summer vacation").
Tomari Seki (関 とまり, Seki Tomari)
Voiced by: Rie Kugimiya
Tomari is a young girl in fifth grade of elementary school. She first met Potemayo while chasing Guchuko after she stole some chestnuts from her. She later ran into Mikan and her brother Yasumi, whom she takes a liking to after he gives her a hat that Mikan had originally given her brother. Tomari is a tomboyish girl who rarely wears female clothing and has very short hair for a girl, which makes her look like a young boy; it came as quite a shock to Mikan, Yasumi and Potemayo to find out Tomari was a girl.
Miku Moriyama (森山 未来, Moriyama Miku)
Voiced by: Kikuko Inoue
Miku is Sunao's late mother. She fell ill a few years before the story in Potemayo begins, and died as a result. She used to say to Sunao that she loved Japan the most out of anywhere in the world because of its flowers.

== Media ==
=== Manga ===
The four-panel comic strip manga series, written and illustrated by Haruka Ogataya, originally started serialization in the Japanese manga magazine Moeyon on July 9, 2004. In October 2005, the series moved to the seinen magazine Comic High! and continued until January 22, 2011. Five tankōbon volumes have been released in Japan, published by Futabasha.

=== Internet radio show ===
An Internet radio show entitled Kana's and Ayumi's Mayonnaise Radio (香菜とあゆみのまよらじ, Kana to Ayumi no Mayo Raji) was streamed between June 29, 2007, and March 28, 2008, every Friday on Beat Net Radio! and Lantis Web Radio. The author of the manga had made two guest appearances, and also the editor of Comic High, Kyōichi Nonaka, had made an appearance. The show was hosted by Kana Hanazawa, who played Potemayo in the anime, and Ayumu Tsuji, who played Guchuko in the anime.

=== Anime ===
A 12-episode anime series adaptation was produced by the animation studio J.C.Staff, directed by Takashi Ikehata, and written by Yuta Ikemi (the collective pen name of Yuji Matsukura, Yuta Todoroki, Takashi Ikehata, and Tetsuro Satomi). It aired in Japan from July 6 to September 21, 2007. Each anime episode usually contains two sub-episodes with separate storylines, ending with 24 sub-episodes by the end of the series. Additionally, there are short animated specials released on the DVDs which are additional sub-episodes to the series. There will be one special per DVD, ending with six total specials.

The anime's opening theme was "Katamichi Catchball" (片道きゃっちぼーる) by Mosaic.wav; the maxi single containing the opening theme was released on July 25, 2007, by Lantis. The ending theme was "Utatane" (うたたね) by Chata; the ending theme single was released on August 22, 2007, also by Lantis. The anime's original soundtrack, composed by Tomoki Kikuya, was released on October 10, 2007.
