= The Conditions of Paradise =

Yuri manga by Akiko Morishima

- Cover for Azure Dreams volume

楽園の条件 (Rakuen no Jouken)
- Genre: Slice of Life, Yuri
- Manga
- Written by: Akiko Morishima
- Published by: Ichijinsha
- English publisher: NA: Seven Seas Entertainment
- Magazine: Comic Yuri Hime
- Original run: 2007 – 2013
- Volumes: 3

The Conditions of Paradise (Japanese: 楽園の条件, Hepburn: Rakuen no Jouken) is a Japanese yuri manga written and illustrated by Akiko Morishima. It was first serialized in Ichijinsha's Comic Yuri Hime in 2007 as a series of one-shots before being collecting into a single tankōbon volume. Morishima went on to revisit similar themes and characters that first appeared in The Conditions of Paradise in later one-shots that were also collected into single tankōbon volumes as Ruriiro no Yume and Hajimete, Kanojo to. Seven Seas Entertainment licensed all three volumes for English-language release and titled them collectively as The Conditions of Paradise.

== Synopsis ==
Sarina and Sumi are best friends and total opposites. Sarina is an organized office worker, while Sumi is a carefree travelling freelance writer. Despite their different lifestyles the two have remained close, with Sarina always offering Sumi a place to crash between travelling. However, their relationship is tested as they navigate between being friends with benefits and having genuine feelings for each other.

== Media ==
=== Manga ===
No.	Title	Original release date	English release date
1	The Conditions of Paradise; Rakuen no Jouken (楽園の条件)	December 18, 2007; 9784758070249	March 24, 2020; 978-1-64505-175-6
2	The Conditions of Paradise: Azure Dreams; Ruriiro no Yume (瑠璃色の夢)	August 18, 2009; 9784758070607	January 26, 2021; 978-1-64505-837-3
3	The Conditions of Paradise: Our First Time; Hajimete, Kanojo to. (初めて、彼女と。)	May 18, 2013; 9784758072465	November 10, 2021; 978-1-64505-836-6

== Reception ==
The Conditions of Paradise received relatively positive reviews, with Reuben Baron of Comic Book Resources surmising that "While The Conditions of Paradise isn't aiming hard on heavy realism, there's an authenticity to the perspective behind its light escapism." Anime News Network gave the first volume an overall B rating, noting that while the series isn't quite as captivating as Morishima's full-length stories, it is "a very nice read nonetheless" Comics Beat also felt the stories were genuinely enjoyable, however they noted that they lacked any kind of edge which might possibly disappoint readers; "those who were hoping that an adult-focused collection would offer a little more than the usual feel-good yuri fare, this is likely not going to satisfy that craving."
