= Himitsu no Recipe =

Japanese manga series

- Cover of the first volume

ひみつのレシピ (Himitsu no Reshipi)
- Genre: Romance, yuri
- Manga
- Written by: Milk Morinaga
- Published by: Houbunsha
- Magazine: Tsubomi; Tsubomi Web
- Original run: February 12, 2009 – April 2013
- Volumes: 2

Himitsu no Recipe (Japanese: ひみつのレシピ, Hepburn: Himitsu no Reshipi; lit. "Secret Recipe") is a Japanese romance yuri manga series written and illustrated by Milk Morinaga and serialized in Tsubomi and later in Tsubomi Web by Houbunsha. It's published in French by Taifu Comics.

== Characters ==
Wakatsuki
A first-year high school student who joins the cooking club on a whim, only to find herself falling for the president of the club. Though she is attractive and popular, her aggressive sexual advances alienate the president. She is initially terrible at cooking, though she becomes considerably better by the end of the series.
Horikawa
A third-year student and president of her school's cooking club. She cares deeply about the club and cooking in general. While she initially considers Wakatsuki a nuisance, she comes to return her classmate's affection by the end of the series.
Kanbe
The former president of the cooking club and a mentor to Horikawa. Their close relationship causes Wakatsuki to become jealous and possessive.

== Manga ==
No.	Japanese release date	Japanese ISBN
1	11 October 2011	978-4-832240-54-4
2	11 February 2013	978-4-832242-98-2

== Reception ==
On manga-news.com, the staff gave it a rating of 14 out of 20. On Manga Sanctuary, two of the staff gave it an averaged rating of 5 out of 10. On AnimeLand, the staff gave both volumes a rating of "interesting" (4) out of 6. Erica Friedman gave the first and second volumes overall scores of 6 out of 10 and 5 out of 10 respectively, and considered Wakatsuki's advances to be sexual harassment.
