= Hanako Oku =

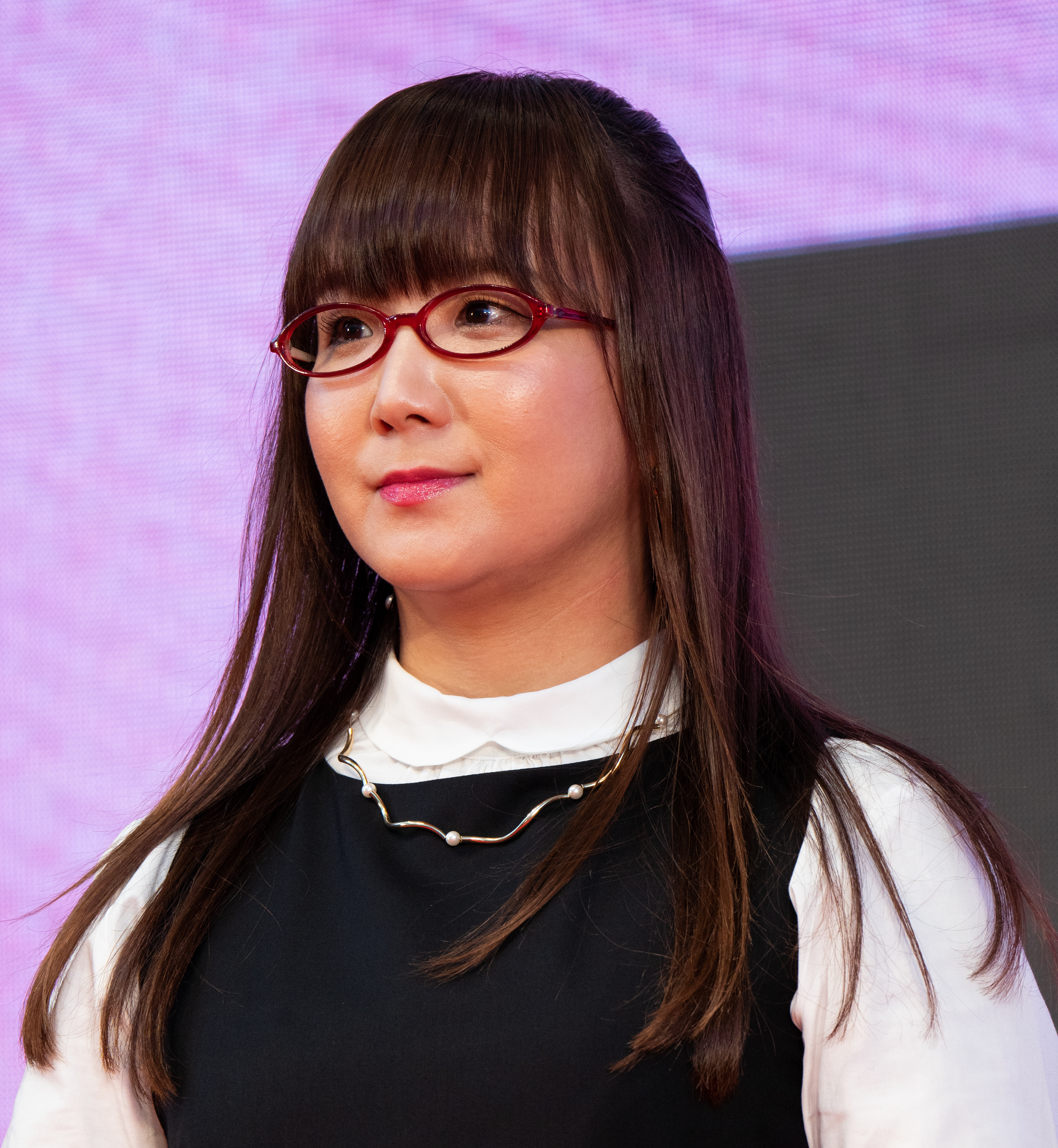
- Oku in 2019

Background information
- Born: 奥華子 Oku Hanako; March 20, 1978 (age 48)
- Origin: Funabashi, Chiba, Japan
- Genres: Pop
- Occupations: Singer, songwriter
- Instruments: Singing, piano
- Years active: 2004–present (solo)
- Label: Pony Canyon
- Website: okuhanako.com

Hanako Oku (奥 華子, Oku Hanako; born March 20, 1978, in Funabashi, Chiba, Japan) is a pop singer famous in her native Japan for her piano ballads. She rose to fame after performing the end-title track "Garnet" for the Madhouse film The Girl Who Leapt Through Time in 2006. She was signed to a major record label the preceding year.

== Biography ==
Oku's musical training began at age 5 with piano lessons, but by age 9 she was also learning the trumpet and was a member of her school's brass band.

In 2004, Oku began to perform on the streets of Tokyo, mainly in Shibuya ward, but once sold 402 CDs in four hours outside Kashiwa railway station. Later that same year she released her first mainstream single Fireworks and performed her debut one-woman show to an audience of 135. Approached by Chiba TV, she made an appearance on the show Chiba Fighting Spirit.

Over the next year she toured western Japan and self-produced two more CD singles before releasing an album in April 2005. Soon afterwards she was signed up by record company Pony Canyon.

In April 2006, the animated film The Girl Who Leapt Through Time was released, with the theme songs "Garnet" and "Kawaranai Mono" sung by Oku.

Come spring 2007, Oku performed to a sell-out crowd at Shibuya C.C. Lemon Hall, and with the release of her album Time Note, she once again performed sold-out concerts there over three nights in July 2007.

Oku still occasionally busked in Tokyo railway stations in 2007, drawing a crowd, and selling her CDs there.

Since June 2005, Hanako Oku has hosted her KameKameHouse radio show on bayfm78 every Sunday night from 22:30 to 23:00. At the end of 2009, the show was renamed Lagan de Talk!. In 2010, Oku began hosting a new radio show E-Tracks Selection once a fortnight on FM OSAKA. Starting January 12, the show airs from 21:00 to 21:30.

An animated music clip of the album version of Oku's song "Kimi no Egao" was released, through Pony Canyon's official YouTube channel, on May 7, 2017. Directed by Takuya Satō and titled Your Light: Kase-san and Morning Glories, the video is an adaptation of Hiromi Takashima's yuri manga Asagao to Kase-san. The album version of the song comes from Oku's sixth album, titled Good-Bye, released in 2012.

== Discography ==
=== Albums ===
Release Date:	Title:
April 20, 2005	Vol. Best (Indies Best)
March 1, 2006	Yasashii Hana no Saku Basho (やさしい花の咲く場所) "The Place Where the Gentle Flowers Bloom"
March 21, 2007	Time Note
March 5, 2008	Koi Tegami (恋手紙) "Love Letter"
July 15, 2009	Birthday
August 18, 2010	Utakata (うたかた) "Bubble"
February 22, 2012	Good-Bye
March 19, 2014	Kimi to Boku no Michi (君と僕の道) "Our Road"
October 28, 2015	PRISM (プリスム)
May 17, 2017	Haruka Tōku ni Mieteita Kyō (遥か遠くに見えていた今日) "Today seemed far away"

=== Singles ===
Release Date:	Title:	Notes:
August 26, 2004	Hanabi (花火) "Fireworks"	Independently released single
July 27, 2005	Yasashii Hana (やさしい花) "Gentle Flowers"	
January 18, 2006	Mahō no Hito (魔法の人) "Magic Person"	
February 15, 2006	Koi Tsubomi (恋つぼみ) "Love Bud"	
July 12, 2006	Garnet (ガーネット) "Garnet"	End-title track for the Madhouse film The Girl Who Leapt Through Time
November 29, 2006	Chiisa na Hoshi (小さな星) "Little Star"	
January 23, 2008	Tegami (手紙) "Letter"	
July 23, 2008	Ashita Saku Hana (明日咲く花) "The Flower that Blooms Tomorrow"	Theme song to NHK's Sekai isshuu! Chikyuu ni fureru. Eko dai kikou (世界一周! 地球に触れる・エコ大紀行) "Around the World! Touch the Earth Eco-Travelogue"
November 19, 2008	Anata ni Suki to Iwaretai (あなたに好きと言われたい) "I Want You to Say 'I Love You'"	
June 3, 2009	Waratte Waratte (笑って笑って) "Smiling and Laughing"	
August 7, 2009	Hanabi (花火) "Fireworks"	Re-mastered and re-released
March 17, 2010	Hatsukoi (初恋) "First Love"	
August 5, 2010	Garasu No Hana (ガラスの花) "Glass Flower"	Used as the theme song for the video game Tales of Phantasia: Narikiri Dungeon X.
January 11, 2012	Cinderella (シンデレラ) "Cinderella"	
January 22, 2014	Fuyu Hanabi (冬花火) "Winter Fireworks"	
March 18, 2015	Kimi ga Kureta Natsu (君がくれた夏) "Summer You Gave Me"	
September 21, 2016	Omoide ni Nare / Ai to iu Takaramono (思い出になれ/愛という宝物) "Become a memory / Treasured love"	
February 22, 2017	Kimi no Hana / Saigo no Kiss (君の花 / 最後のキス) "Your flower / Last Kiss"	

=== DVD ===
Release Date:	Title:
July 18, 2007	Hanako Oku: 2007 Spring Concert: Time Note at Shibuya C.C. Lemon Hall
March 18, 2009	Hanako Oku Live Tour 08: Hajimete Band de Utaimasu!
March 18, 2009	Hanako Oku Live Tour 08: Mochiron Hitori de Hikigatari!
March 20, 2013	Band Live Tour '11 "Cinderella"/ CONCERT TOUR'12 Hikikatari – 5th Letter -
March 16, 2016	Oku Hanako 10th Anniversary Special Concert 2015

=== Blu-ray ===
March 16, 2016	Oku Hanako 10th Anniversary Special Concert 2015
