= Kindred Spirits on the Roof =

Japanese visual novel

屋上の百合霊さん (Okujō no Yurirei-san)
- Genre: Romance, yuri
- Video game
- Developer: Liar-soft
- Publisher: MangaGamer
- Genre: Visual novel
- Platform: Microsoft Windows
- Released: JP: March 30, 2012; WW: February 12, 2016; Full Chorus: JP: January 26, 2018; WW: January 17, 2019
- Audio drama
- Original run: January 24, 2014 – January 30, 2015
- Episodes: 4
- Manga
- Written by: Hachi Itō, Toi Tentsu
- Illustrated by: Hachi Itō, Aya Fumio
- Published by: Hirari Comics
- English publisher: NA: Seven Seas Entertainment
- Published: April 30, 2015
- Volumes: 2

Kindred Spirits on the Roof (Japanese: 屋上の百合霊さん, Hepburn: Okujō no Yurirei-san) (Note: The term "yurirei" (百合霊) is a portmanteau of yuri (百合) and yūrei (幽霊, ghost).) is an adult yuri visual novel developed by Liar-soft, originally released in Japan on March 30, 2012. The game was licensed by MangaGamer and released in English on February 12, 2016. An updated version featuring fully voiced dialogue was released in Japan on January 26, 2018.

== Gameplay ==
Kindred Spirits on the Roof is a fairly linear visual novel where players read through the story, accompanied with visual graphics and occasionally voiced dialogue (fully voiced in the Full Chorus version). The story is split into several chunks, which each take part during a single day on a planner ranging from April to November and can be replayed at any time. These are divided up into main story scenes, told from the perspective of the main characters, and couple story scenes, which are told from the perspective of the side characters. While the game does not feature alternative routes and endings like other visual novels, some dialogue choices that offer minor differences can unlock extra scenes which can be viewed upon completing the main story. The planner can also be used to view CG images and listen to music tracks that the player has encountered throughout the game.

== Plot ==
While on the rooftop of Kokonotsuboshi Girls' Academy of Commerce (商科九ツ星女子学園, Shōka Kokonotsuboshi Joshi Gakuen; known as "Shirojo" for short) one day, second year student Yuna Toomi encounters two ghosts, Sachi Enoki and Megumi Nagatani, who are bound to the school. Having fallen in love with each other, Sachi and Megumi explain that they want to experience their first time together so they may pass on, but don't know how to do so. Having noticed several other students who are harboring romantic feelings for other girls, Sachi and Megumi ask Yuna to help these girls realize their love and create a "yuritopia" so that they can gain the necessary knowledge they need.

As Yuna and the so-called "kindred spirits" work together to help each of these couples find love with each other, Yuna soon comes to realize that she is developing feelings for her childhood friend, Hina Komano. When Hina suddenly confesses to her, Yuna is worried about how she should answer her, but is eventually encouraged to come to an answer and begin dating her. With both Yuna and Hina agreeing to let them possess their bodies, Sachi and Megumi finally have their first time together, allowing them to pass on peacefully.

== Characters ==
=== Main characters ===
Yuna Toomi (遠見 結奈, Tōmi Yuna)
Voiced by: Kawashima Rino
The main protagonist. A second year student who is able to see and communicate with Sachi and Megumi and begrudgingly helps them in creating their "yuritopia". She is a skilled cook, although an incident during middle school has slightly traumatised her.
Sachi Enoki (榎木 サチ, Enoki Sachi)
Voiced by: Takaido Shizuku
A tall ghost who wears a black uniform. She died eighty years ago after falling from a rooftop while saving a girl she had unrequited feelings for. While seemingly refined and polite, she tries to hide how cowardly she feels herself to be.
Megumi Nagatani (永谷 恵, Nagatani Megumi)
Voiced by: Kusayanagi Junko
A cheerful ghost who wears a white uniform. Thirty years ago, she fell in love with Sachi's ghost before dying from pneumonia, immediately confessing to Sachi upon becoming a ghost herself. She often gets jealous of Yuna acting so closely to Sachi.
Hina Komano (狛野 比奈, Komano Hina)
Voiced by: Kanade Mahiru
A first year student on the track and field team, who is often soft-spoken. She is Yuna's neighbor and childhood friend who regularly enjoys her cooking.

=== Other characters ===
Fuji Ano (阿野 藤, Ano Fuji)
Voiced by: Togashi Kei
One of Yuna's friends who helps her whenever she can, although usually forgets something every time she comes to school. She is an avid fan of yuri, but can't picture herself in an actual relationship.
Seina Maki (牧 聖苗, Maki Seina)
Voiced by: Oukawa Mio
A first year student who falls in love at first sight with her senior Miki. She is very strong, despite her small size.
Miki Aihara (相原美紀, Aihara Miki)
Voiced by: Misumi Nanaho
A kind third year student and vice president of the school beautification committee. She is always helping to people, but she is often taken advantage of and given more tasks than necessary.
Umi Ichiki (一木 羽美, Ichiki Umi)
Voiced by: Kanade Mahiru
A second year student in the broadcasting club. She is very honest, and enjoys nothing more than spending time with her friends Nena and Sasa.
Sasa Futano (双野 沙紗, Futano Sasa)
Voiced by: Haruna Ren
A second year student in the broadcasting club. A somewhat goth girl who outwardly appears cold, but deep down does cherish her friends a great deal. She is in love with Umi.
Nena Miyama (三山 音七, Miyama Nena)
Voiced by: Notsuki Mahiru
A second year student in the broadcasting club. She is always tired and wanting to sleep, but often gets dragged around by her friends to do various things anyway.
Kiri Tsurugimine (剣峰 桐, Tsurugimine Kiri)
Voiced by: Haruna Ren
A second year student, and the only member of the math club. She is in love with Tsukuyo, who she lovingly calls "Tsukuyo-chan".
Tsukuyo Sonou (園生 月代, Sonō Tsukuyo)
Voiced by: Kusayanagi Junko
A classical literature teacher, and also the adviser of the math club. She is very popular among students due to her kindness and cute appearance.
Youka Koba (古場 陽香, Koba Yōka)
Voiced by: Rita
A second year student and rock musician in a band, who was Yuna's friend in middle school. She falls in love with Aki and becomes determined to write a song confessing her feelings to her.
Aki Ariu (有遊 愛来, Ariu Aki)
Voiced by: Togashi Kei
A second year student on the disciplinary committee. While she takes tardiness very seriously, she becomes entranced by Youka's lively personality.
Matsuri Amishima (網島 茉莉, Amishima Matsuri)
Voiced by: Oukawa Mio
A third year student and captain of the track and field team. She has been in a relationship with Miyu for several years. She is the more spontaneous of the two.
Miyu Inamoto (稲本 美夕, Inamoto Miyu)
Voiced by: Notsuki Mahiru
A third year student and vice captain of the track and field team. Unlike Matsuri, she is more serious, and always plans ahead, making Matsuri adhere to several promises to make sure their relationship isn't discovered.

== Release history ==
Kindred Spirits on the Roof was initially released in Japan on March 30, 2012. An English version published by MangaGamer was released on February 12, 2016, and was one of the first adult visual novels to be released uncensored on the Steam store. The game's opening song is Girl's Spirit -Otome no Kimochi- (Girl's Spirit -オトメノキモチ-), and the ending song is A new day. Both are composed by Blueberry&Yogurt, and performed by Rita.

In March 2017, Liar-soft announced the production of an enhanced edition of Kindred Spirits on the Roof featuring full voice acting, and additional CGs. Titled Kindred Spirits on the Roof Full Chorus, it was released in Japan on January 26, 2018. MangaGamer released the updated version in English on January 17, 2019, as both a standalone release and as downloadable content for the original version.

== Adaptations ==
=== Drama CDs ===
A four-part drama CD sequel was published after the game's release. The CDs are set after the events of the visual novel, and tell after stories for the characters. The drama CDs were also licensed by MangaGamer who released them with English subtitles in 2016. The fourth drama CD includes the game's soundtrack.

Vol	Title	Japanese release date	English release date
1	Playing Girlfriends (恋人ごっこ, Koibito Gokko)	January 24, 2014	April 26, 2016
2	Friendship Plans (友情プラン, Yūjō Puran)	April 25, 2014	May 27, 2016
3	Rain Kick (夕立キック, Yūdachi Kikku)	August 15, 2014	June 17, 2016
4	Kyuusei Radio (九星ラジオ, Kyūsei Rajio) / Kindred Spirits Pop Show (百合霊歌謡ショー, Yurirei Kayō Shō)	January 30, 2015	August 5, 2016

=== Manga ===
A two-volume manga spin-off published by Hirari Comics was released on April 30, 2015. The first volume, Another Yuritopia (もうひとつのユリトピア, Mou Hitotsu no Yuritopia) was written and illustrated by Hachi Itō, while the second volume, Friendship Quiz (仲良しクイズ, Nakayoshi Kuizu), was written by Toi Tentsu and illustrated by Aya Fumio. The manga was licensed by Seven Seas Entertainment who released it in English as a single omnibus volume on January 31, 2017. The manga takes place after the events of the game and focuses on new characters who were not in the original visual novel, alongside returning characters.

== Reception ==
Prior to its English release, Kindred Spirits on the Roof received positive media attention when MangaGamer announced that it would be released on Steam with no content censored or removed. Previously, Steam would require all games with adult content to be censored, which makes Kindred Spirits on the Roof potentially the first adult title to be released on Steam with no censorship whatsoever. Anime News Network quoted MangaGamer's head translator saying, "This is monumental news for the industry as a whole...Seeing frank depictions of same-sex relationships welcomed on such a major gaming platform is a true testament to the open-mindedness of our society and the growing desire for mature entertainment that people of all walks of life can enjoy." PC Gamer commented that "It may also indicate the 'guns good/boobs bad' thinking that's guided game ratings for decades is finally starting to change."

Kindred Spirits on the Roof has been well received by critics. Marcus Estrada from Hardcore Gamer gave it a 4/5 rating saying, "Kindred Spirits on the Roof is an excellent visual novel, yuri romance focused or otherwise. Every character is imbued with a fantastic personality and the story is both light and heavy in proper measure. Reading through the main storyline — and the 'extra' scenes — is an absolute joy." Erica Friedman gave the game a 9/10 rating, citing the game's likeable characters and how, "In every single scenario, the characters go through actual development...when crises pop up and are resolved, the characters change and grow."
