= Girl Friends (manga) =

Yuri manga from Milk Morinaga

- The cover of the first tankōbon volume, featuring Mariko Kumakura (left) and Akiko Oohashi (right)

ガールフレンズ
- Genre: Romance, yuri
- Manga
- Written by: Milk Morinaga
- Published by: Futabasha
- English publisher: NA: Seven Seas Entertainment
- Magazine: Comic High!
- Original run: October 21, 2006 – August 21, 2010
- Volumes: 5
- Audio drama
- Directed by: Midori Shimazawa
- Released: 28 January 2011
- Episodes: 1
- icon

Girl Friends (Japanese: ガールフレンズ, Hepburn: Gāru Furenzu) is a yuri manga series by Milk Morinaga. It was serialized by Futabasha in the seinen manga magazine Comic High! from October 2006 to August 2010, and subsequently published as five bound volumes. The manga has been licensed in North America by Seven Seas Entertainment.

== Plot ==
The story revolves around the quiet and solitary Mari Kumakura, whose only noticeable quality is her top of the class grades. Enter the cute and friendly Akko Oohashi, whose goal is to get to know Mari and become best friends with her. With Akko's help, Mari becomes more confident and sociable, quickly transforming into one of the more fashionable girls in school. As the story progresses, she becomes good friends with Akko and her friends Sugi and Tamami. The group has experiences with alcohol, boys, diets, fashion, friends and studies. However, as the plot develops, Mari, and later Akko, becomes aware of the deeper feelings she possesses for her best friend, feelings that eclipse friendship. Caught between romance and friendship, the two must come to terms with their love for one another, knowing that by doing so, their relationship, and even their lives, could drastically change forever.

== Characters ==
Mariko Kumakura (熊倉 真理子, Kumakura Mariko)
Voiced by: Mikoi Sasaki
The protagonist, whose nickname is Mari. She is a shy and polite person who always sits by herself during lunch breaks and reads books. When Akko befriends her, Mari starts to change and her personality starts to develop. She has recently become less shy and more socially-aware. In an effort to distance herself from her feelings for her friend, she goes out with a boy (despite having growing feelings of romantic love for Akko). Her resolve to remain "just friends" with Akko did not hold for long; tormented by the then unaware Akko's kindness and care, she kissed Akko on the lips on impulse twice, but then chooses not to speak of it any more (on the realization that her love will never be reciprocated).
Akiko Oohashi (大橋 亜希子, Ōhashi Akiko)
Voiced by: Aya Endō
Second protagonist, known to her friends as "Akko". A confident and attractive girl who befriends Mari at the start of the story. She displays many attributes of a stereotypical teenage girl, such as being knowledgeable about dating, fashion, and dieting. She claims to know a lot about guys despite barely interacting with them, interacting even less so when she becomes friends with Mari. Over the course of the story she developed feelings for Mari, and her increasing jealousy of Mari's boyfriend made that clear for her.
Satoko Sugiyama (杉山 里子, Sugiyama Satoko)
Voiced by: Yū Kobayashi
Nicknamed "Sugi-san," she is an outgoing playgirl who has several boyfriends, likes to go to mixers, and drinks a lot. It has been mentioned that she and Tamami kiss quite often (though only as a sign of friendship). She often is seen as the most promiscuous and party-loving of the group and tends to strip her clothes off when she is drunk. She is surprisingly a light-weight when it comes to drinking. She sometimes is embarrassed to be friends with Tamami whenever the latter girl is publicly cosplaying or engaging in her geeky hobbies. Sugi is often viewed and revered as the "grown-up" in the group (in terms of her attractiveness, allure and knowledge about male-female relationships,) and Akiko has consulted her several times when it comes to issues involving Mariko. She is quite perceptive; she is the first and only person to figure out that Akko and Mari are in love with one another. She seems a bit wary of this, as she is concerned about their well-being, but chooses to watch over them from afar. In an omake chapter dedicated to her, she even envies how the both of them can retain their innocence and purity.
Tamami Sekine (関根 珠実, Sekine Tamami)
Voiced by: Mika Kanai
A cute and funny girl who is best friends with Sugi. Her nickname is Tama-nin. She is an otaku and often buys or talks about anime, manga, and video games. Contrastingly, she also likes nightclubs, drinking, food, and partying. When the original group is split up, Tamami and Satoko grow apart despite promising to stay in touch and be good friends but with help from Mari and Akko they are reunited. They have since been extremely close despite no longer being in the same class.
Chiharu Kuno (久野 千晴, Kuno Chiharu)
Becomes friends with Mari and Akko in the second year, when Sugi-san and Tama-nin end up in different classes. Called "Kuno-chin"; she has an older boyfriend (her "prince") met at a mixer party, with whom she is constantly preoccupied. A good student who hates sports, particularly the interpretive dances in which the students are forced to participate. Becomes friends with Sugi-san and Tama-nin when the two take Mari and Akko's place at a mixer party.
Urara Taguchi (田口 うらら, Taguchi Urara)
Introduces herself to Mari and Akko in the second year, along with Kuno-chin. Usually called "Tagu"; she resents her parents having given her such a cute, girly name (unfitting for her as she's something of a tomboy). She's in the tennis club, which takes up a good deal of her free time (and because of which she often gets severely sunburned). Despite being best friends with Kuno-chin, is irritated by her constant flow of talk about her "prince"—not least because she herself doesn't really have the time to find a boyfriend. Loves scary stories, but is easily terrified by them (as shown on the school trip).

== Media ==
=== Manga ===
Girl Friends was serialized by Futabasha in the seinen manga magazine Comic High! from October 2006 to August 2010. The series was completed with five bound volumes published. The manga is licensed in Taiwan by Sharp Point Press, in France by Taifu Comics, in Russia by Palma Press, in Germany by Carlsen, in North America by Seven Seas Entertainment and in Spain by Planeta Cómic.

=== Drama CD ===
A drama CD adaptation directed by Midori Shimazawa was released on 28 January 2011 after advance sales at Comic Market 79 in December 2010. The drama adapts the first two volumes.

== Reception ==
In Anime News Network's Right Turn Only!! feature, Girl Friends was given a generally positive review; however, the reviewer noted, "The ending is rather abrupt" and "your typical happily ever after ending."
