= Akira Nishimori =

Japanese anime director

- 西森章
- Occupation: Anime director

Akira Nishimori (西森 章, Nishimori Akira) is a Japanese anime director, known for directing series such as Rumic Theater, Gallery Fake, Petopeto-san, Hitohira, Zombie-Loan, and three Battle Spirits television series.

== Works ==
List of works in anime television series and OVAs
Year	Title	Crew role	Notes	Source
1990	A.D. Police Files	co-director	OVA	
1991	Neko Neko Fantasia ja:ねこ・ねこ・幻想曲	Director	OVA	
1992	Ai no Kusabi	Director	OVA	
1994	Otaku no Seiza	Director	OVA	
1997	Fujimi Orchestra	Director	OVA	
2003	Rumic Theater	Director		
2005	Gallery Fake	Director		
2005	Petopeto-san	Director		
2007	Hitohira	Director		
2007	Zombie-Loan	Director		
2009–10	Battle Spirits: Shounen Gekiha Dan ja:バトルスピリッツ 少年激覇ダン	Director		
2010–11	Battle Spirits Brave ja:バトルスピリッツ ブレイヴ	Director		
2011–12	Battle Spirits Brave ja:バトルスピリッツ 覇王	Director		
2017	18if	Director		

List of works in feature films
Year	Title	Crew role	Notes	Source
1998	Beast Wars II: Lio Convoy's Close Call!	Director	film	
2002	éX-Driver the Movie	Director	film	
