= Izumi Kirihara =

Japanese manga artist

Izumi Kirihara (桐原 いづみ, Kirihara Izumi) is a Japanese manga artist. She is the author and illustrator for the manga series Hitohira, the first of her works to be adapted into an anime television series.

== Works ==
- Chocolate: maid cafe "curio"
- Fw: Zombienes Regina
- Hitohira
- I Had That Same Dream Again
- Kokonoka no Majo
- Mabinogi
- Shirayuki Panimix!
- Gun-jou
