= Nara Kasugano International Forum Iraka =

Convention center in Nara, Japan

Nara Kasugano International Forum IRAKA
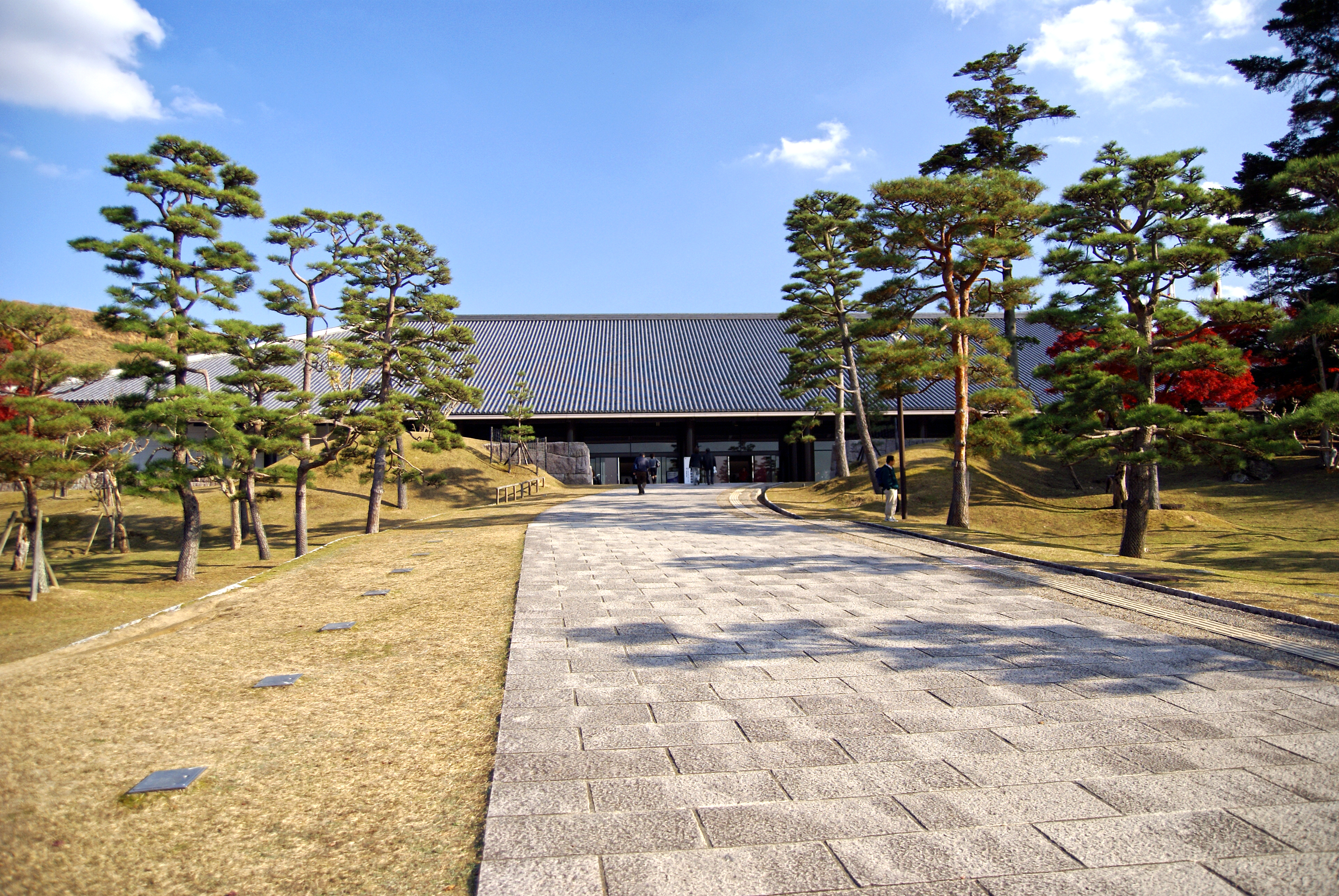
- Interactive map of Nara Kasugano International Forum IRAKA
- Former names: Nara Prefectural New Public Hall
- Address: 101 Kasugano-cho,
- Location: Nara, Nara, Japan
- Coordinates: 34°41′2″N 135°50′36″E
- Owner: Nara Prefecture
- Operator: Nara Prefecture; Hiramatsu Inc. TYO: 2764
- Public transit: Kintetsu Nara Station

Construction
- Built: 11 April 1986–30 September 1987
- Opened: 1 April 1989
- Renovated: 1 July 2015
- Expanded: 1 July 2015
- Construction cost: ¥5 billion (¥6.42 billion in 2024 yen)

Website
- www.i-ra-ka.jp/en/

Nara Kasugano International Forum IRAKA (奈良春日野国際フォーラム 甍 I・RA・KA, Nara-kasugano kokusai fōramu iraka), formerly known as Nara Prefectural New Public Hall (奈良県新公会堂, Nara-ken shin-kōkaidō), is a convention center in Nara, Nara, Japan. Located near Kasuga Grand Shrine in Nara Park, the venue re-opened on July 1, 2015, annexing its adjacent public building that served as Nara Park Silk Road Exchange Hall (奈良公園シルクロード交流館, Nara-kōen siruku-rōdo kōryūkan) that closed on December 31, 2014.
