= Akiko Morishima =

Japanese manga artist

- Born: March 20, 1973 (age 53) Tokyo, Japan
- Area: Manga

Akiko Morishima (森島明子, Morishima Akiko; born March 20, 1973) is a Japanese yuri and shōjo manga writer and artist.

Their work focuses on relationships between lesbian women on various stages of life. Some themes of their manga are first love and first relationships, facing being lesbian, discovering lesbian relationships, closeting, workplace relationships, age gap and long-term lesbian relationships.

== Works ==
- The Conditions of Paradise (2007) (1 volume)
- Hanjuku Joshi (2008–2009) (2 volumes)
- Seigakuin Kōka Daigaku Yakan-bu (2009)
- The Conditions of Paradise: Azure Dreams (2009) (1 volume)
- Renai Joshika (2010–2011) (2 volumes)
- Renai Joshi File
- The Conditions of Paradise: Our First Time (2013) (1 volume)
- Onna no ko Awase (2013) (1 volume)
- Yurikuma Arashi (2014–2016, art)
- Motto Hanjuku Joshi (2017–2021)
