= Comic High! =

Japanese manga magazine

- Cover of the November 2007 issue featuring the characters from Chu-Bra
- Editor: Kyōichi Nonaka
- Categories: Seinen manga
- Frequency: Monthly
- Publisher: Futabasha
- First issue: 2 March 2004
- Final issue: May 2015
- Company: Futabasha
- Country: Japan
- Based in: Tokyo
- Language: Japanese
- Website: webaction.jp/comichigh/

Comic High! (コミック・ハイ!, Komikku Hai!) was a Japanese seinen manga magazine published on a monthly basis by Futabasha. It was launched as a special issue of Weekly Manga Action but became its own independent monthly anthology. The magazine was first published on 2 March 2004 as the industry's first shōjo manga magazine for males; the official website describes the magazine as "Girlish comics for boys and girls." The magazine is aimed at males between 18 and 35 years old. The final issue of the magazine was published in May 2015.

== Manga serialized ==
- 15-sai
- Aitama
- Akatsuki-iro no Senpuku Majo
- BadeMayo
- Caterpillar & Butterfly
- Chu-Bra!!
- Devil na Ebiru
- Dysmatopia
- Fujoshi Rumi
- Gakuen Polizi
- Girl Friends
- High School Girls
- Hitohira
- Hon Uru Shōjo
- I Don't Like You at All, Big Brother!!
- Kodomo no Jikan
- MachiMachi
- Mii-tan
- Miman Renai
- My Big Family
- Potemayo
- Oniichan Control
- Over Drive Girl 1/6
- Sora☆Miyo
- TsubuLala
- Ufu Ufu Fuufu
- Umi Monogatari
