= Futabasha =

Japanese publishing company

Futabasha Publishers Ltd.

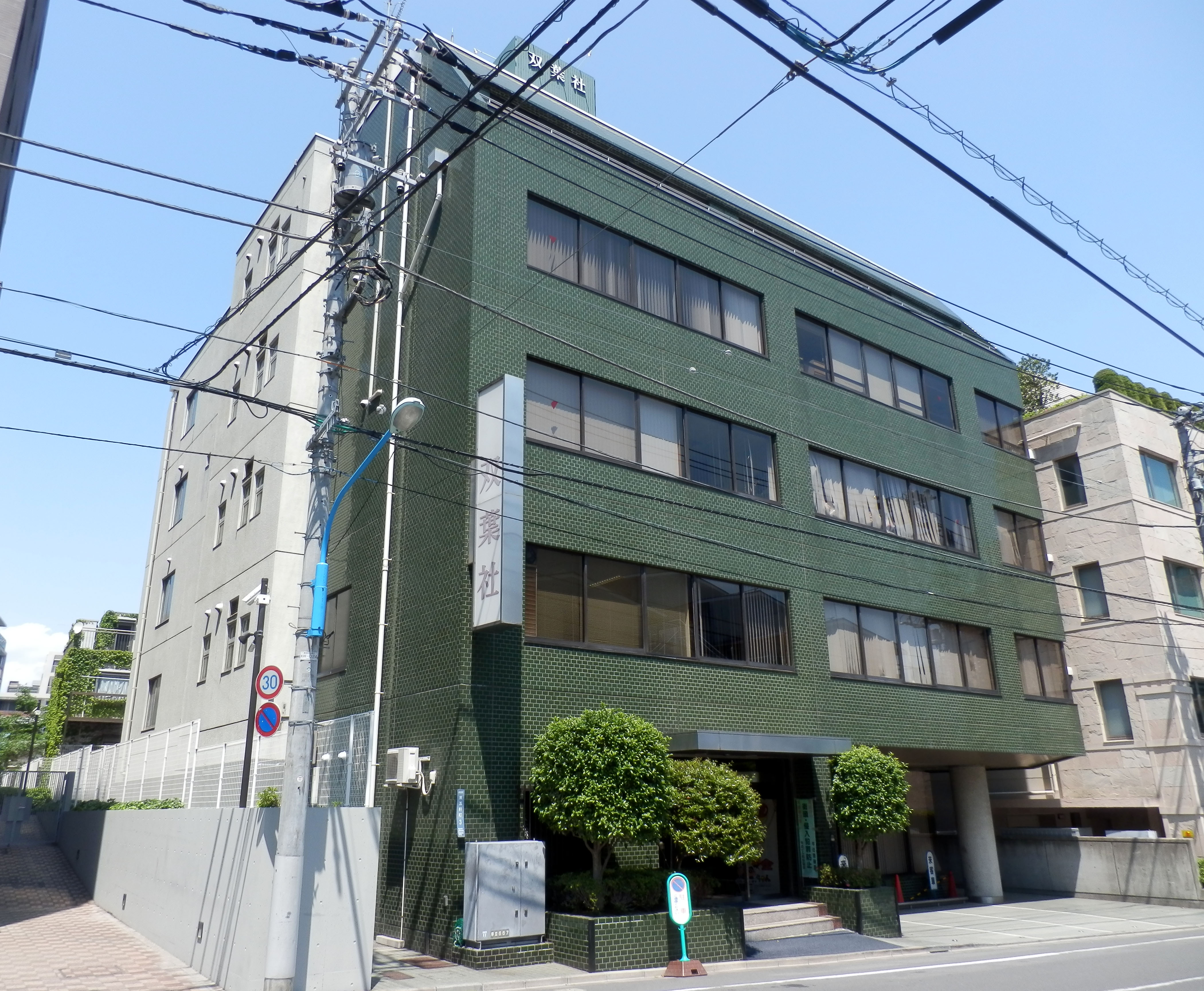
- Headquarters in Shinjuku, Tokyo
- Native name: 株式会社双葉社
- Romanized name: Kabushikigaisha Futabasha
- Type: Private
- Industry: Publishing
- Founded: May 1948; 78 years ago
- Headquarters: Hikaishi-Gokenchō, Shinjuku, Tokyo, Japan
- Products: Books; Magazines; Manga
- Number of employees: 174
- Subsidiaries: DEF Studios
- Website: www.futabasha.co.jp

Futabasha Publishers Ltd. (株式会社双葉社, Kabushiki Gaisha Futabasha) is a Japanese publishing company headquartered in Hikaishigokenchō, Shinjuku, Tokyo, Japan. Futabasha is known for its seinen manga works, and its 1967 magazine Manga Action first conceived of the seinen manga category, decades before the other major companies tested the market.

== List of magazines published by Futabasha ==
| Magazine Name | Genre | Frequency | Publication date | First Issue |
|---|---|---|---|---|
| &home | Home interior | Quarterly | Jan, Apr, Jul, Oct | April 15, 2004 |
| Action Pizazz (アクション ピザッツ) | Seinen manga (Adult men's magazine) | Monthly | 21st | |
| Comic High! (コミックハイ！) | Seinen manga | Monthly | 22nd | March 2, 2004 |
| JILLE | Fashion | Monthly | 12th | November 2001 |
| EX Taishū (EX大衆) | Men's magazine | Monthly | 15th | July 2005 |
| Jour Suteki na Shufu tachi (JOURすてきな主婦たち) | Josei manga | Monthly | 2nd | April 1985 |
| KoiYui (KoiYui 恋結) | Digital Shojo manga and Josei manga | Irregular | | February 2013 |
| Monthly Manga Town (月刊まんがタウン) | Seinen manga (4koma manga for Salarymen) | Monthly | 5th | November 5, 2000 |
| Men's YOUNG (メンズヤング) | Seinen manga | Monthly | 30th | May 1995 |
| Pachinko Kōryaku Magazine (パチンコ攻略マガジン) | Pachinko gambling (Men's magazine) | Semimonthly | 2nd and 4th Thursdays | April 1989 |
| Pachisuro Kōryaku Magazine (パチスロ攻略マガジン) | Gambling machines (Men's magazine) | Monthly | 7th | September 1993 |
| Photokon Life (フォトコンライフ) | Photography | Quarterly | Mar, Jun, Sep, Dec | |
| Shōsetsu Suiri (小説推理) | Novel magazine | Monthly | 27th | |
| Weekly Taishū (週刊大衆) | Men's magazine | Weekly | Mondays | |
| Soccer Hihyō (サッカー批評) | Soccer | Quarterly | Mar, Jun, Sep, Dec | |
| Manga Action (漫画アクション) | Seinen manga | Semimonthly | 1st and 3rd Tuesdays | July 7, 1967 |
| Crossword Day (クロスワードDay) | Crossword puzzles | Monthly | 2nd | |
| Figue Beauty | Beauty magazine | Irregular | | 2013 |

- Bravo Ski
- Comic Seed!
- Futabasha Web Magazine
- Manga Action ZERO
- Tōji Rō
- Getter Robot Saga
- Monthly Action (ended)

== Manga ==
- Bar Lemon Heart
- Crayon Shin-chan
- Crime and Punishment: A Falsified Romance
- Kodomo no Jikan
- Koizora
- Lupin III
- Lone Wolf and Cub
- Miss Kobayashi's Dragon Maid
- My Brother's Husband
- Old Boy
- Oruchuban Ebichu
- Our Colors
- Tsugumomo
- Orange
