= List of This Monster Wants to Eat Me episodes =

This Monster Wants to Eat Me is a 2025 anime television series directed by Yūsuke Suzuki and produced by Studio Lings. The show's thirteen episodes are adapted from a manga series written and illustrated by Sai Naekawa. The series follows Hinako, a girl who wishes to die, and Shiori, a mermaid who promises to fulfill Hinako's desire by eating her, but only when Hinako is at her happiest moment.

The manga's anime adaptation was announced on October 21, 2024. Naoyuki Kuzuya served as chief director, Mitsutaka Hirota wrote the scripts, Sō Ikuyama designed the characters, and Keiji Inai composed the music. The series aired from October 2 to December 25, 2025, on AT-X and other networks. The opening theme song is "nie" ("贄-nie-"; 'Sacrifice'), performed by Yoshino, while the ending theme song is "Lily" (リリィ, Rirī), performed by Reina Ueda as her character Hinako Yaotose. Crunchyroll is streaming the series. Medialink licensed the series in Southeast Asia.

== Episode list ==
No.	Title	Directed by	Storyboarded by	Original release date
1	"A Girl Who Seeks Death Waits for the Sea"; Transliteration: "Shinitagari no Kanojo wa Umi o Matsu" (Japanese: 死にたがりの彼女は海を待つ)	Yūsuke Suzuki	Naoyuki Kuzuya	October 2, 2025
Ever since the death of her family in an accident, Hinako Yaotose has lived with the constant belief that she should also be dead, but cannot bring herself to end her own life. One day, she meets a mysterious blue-eyed girl, who warns her about the dangers of the sea. At school, Hinako's only friend Miko worries about her constantly. While waiting for Miko after school, Hinako has a vision of the blue eyed girl that lures her to the nearby ocean. Iso-onna, an ocean vampire, appears and pulls her in, intending to devour her. Hinako feels an unexpected sense of peace underwater and accepts death, hoping to reunite with her family. However, she is rescued by the blue-eyed girl, revealed to be a mermaid named Shiori, who kills Iso-onna. Shiori explains that Hinako's blood makes her especially delicious to yokai; Shiori and Iso-onna are revealed to be yokai themselves, so she plans to protect her from other yokai until she is at her most flavorful, after which she will eat Hinako herself. Accepting this fate, Hinako looks forward to finally dying and even smiles when Shiori transfers into her class the next day.
2	"The Sunlit Beast and the Festival Song"; Transliteration: "Shayō no Kemono to Matsuri-bayashi" (Japanese: 斜陽の獣と祭囃子)	Shūsaku Katō	Yūsuke Suzuki	October 9, 2025
The male students begin taking a liking to Shiori as she sits down near Hinako, as Miko is absent for unknown reasons. While having lunch, Shiori reveals that she did not bring any food as she still has her sights on eating Hinako. The awkward conversation leads Hinako to head back to the ocean, still wishing to die right away. Unable to commit suicide, she decides that only Shiori can put her out of her misery. The next day, Miko returns to class. Growing jealous of Shiori bonding with her friend, Miko spends time talking with Hinako. Shiori explains to Hinako that she has no interest in eating Miko and tells her about the different kinds of yokai in the world. As Hinako continues to quietly suffer, Shiori invites her to a festival. Though Hinako declines, Shiori forces her to attend anyway to make her healthy enough to be eaten.
3	"The Sea of Hope"; Transliteration: "Kibō no Umi" (Japanese: 希望の海)	Zenichirou Itō	Yūsuke Suzuki	October 16, 2025
At the festival, Hinako remembers attending a festival with her family, causing her to run away. Shiori finds her and Hinako asks her to either leave her alone or eat her. Shiori kills a yokai trying to ambush Hinako and reminds her she needs to wait until Hinako is delicious enough before eating her. Shiori asks why Hinako wants to die. Hinako reveals her family died when their car crashed and sank into the ocean. She was certain someone from the car shouted for her to survive, so she always felt unable to kill herself. Shiori says that if Hinako wants to die soon, she should find reasons to keep living. They return to the festival where Miko sees them together. The next day, Miko notices that Hinako seems happier and questions her about the festival, but she shrugs it off. Shiori deduces that Miko means a lot to Hinako, who reveals when her family died, Miko was the only one that continued treating her the same as before. Shiori kills a yokai and is surprised when Miko sees what happened.
4	"An Ephemeral Tie"; Transliteration: "Utakata no Musubime" (Japanese: 泡沫の結び目)	Yoshitaka Nagaoka	Naoyuki Kuzuya & Takeshi Mori	October 23, 2025
After reprimanding Shiori for messing around, Miko reveals herself to be a yokai and claims that she wants to protect Hinako. Hinako arrives before they can fight and Miko leaves with her. Shiori sneaks into the principal's office to steal the student records, all while eluding a male student who saw her go in, and realizes Miko's real background. Confronting Hinako and Miko at the docks, she reveals Miko's true nature. Hinako finds this hard to believe, but Shiori reveals that powerful yokai use special magic to infiltrate human society without detection. With her cover blown, Miko changes into her true form, a gigantic kitsune, to fight Shiori. A side story shows Miko teaching Hinako how to cook.
5	"The Beast of Affection"; Transliteration: "Shin'ai no Kemono" (Japanese: 親愛の獣)	Katsunari Mikajiri	Shin'ichi Inami	October 30, 2025
In a flashback, Hinako is sent to live with her aunt following her family's death, which is when she became friends with Miko. Returning to the present, Miko and Shiori battle. Upon seeing Hinako get injured during their fight, Miko returns to her human form, fearing that the scent of Hinako's blood will cause her to lose control. Shiori prepares to finish Miko off, but Hinako stops her. Miko also reveals that in the past, she was captured and forced to serve a village in human form, leading to her gradual bonding with humanity. As Hinako approaches Miko, Miko takes her true form again and seemingly prepares to eat her.
6	"The Shape of Affection"; Transliteration: "Shin'ai no Katachi" (Japanese: 親愛の形)	Hiroyuki Okuno	Naoyuki Kuzuya	November 6, 2025
Instead of eating Hinako, Miko bites off a part of her own tail, the source of her yokai power, to satiate her hunger, and Shiori decides to spare Miko so she can be Hinako's bodyguard. That night, Shiori and Miko go out to the docks to chat, to which Miko reveals that a bruise that Hinako sustained in the accident is why her blood started attracting yokai and that she had been protecting her ever since. She also demands that Shiori helps keep Hinako safe, even though the two do not personally get along. After Miko is called away to handle something important, Hinako expresses how happy she feels being with Miko, though she is still allowing herself to be eaten by Shiori once ready. As Shiori and Hinako leave for the beach, Miko warns Hinako about seeing Shiori's true form, but also cannot accompany them as biting off her tails makes it more difficult to leave her territory. As Shiori and Hinako visit the beach, they enjoy each other's company. When it suddenly rains, many arms start to emerge from the ocean.
7	"Kind People"; Transliteration: "Yasashī Hito" (Japanese: 優しいひと)	Shūsaku Katō	Naoyuki Kuzuya	November 13, 2025
People are bothered by the storm while Shiori and Hinako head down to the beach to see the arms in the water, who belong to humans who died at sea. Hinako wonders if her family's corpses are among them. As they take shelter from the storm, Shiori discovers Hinako's bruise. After the storm ends, Miko invites Hinako to join a basketball training camp. Shiori tags along, to Miko's annoyance. While agreeing to work at camp, Shiori and Hinako meet Ayame Chiba, who is also helping out. Shiori is suspicious of her. Miko is further jealous that Hinako is warming up to Shiori more than her, but Shiori suggests that she should open up to Hinako more. Shiori and Miko also sense that Ayame's blood gives off an unpleasant smell that is stronger than Hinako's. As Shiori and Hinako continue to spend time with each other, Shiori reveals that the true reason why she is being nice is for her own gain, and warns her that her friendship with Miko may also be the same. Meanwhile, Ayame and Hinako get along well, and they talk about Hinako's friends.
8	"The Cause of the Cracks"; Transliteration: "Hibiware no Gen'in" (Japanese: ひび割れの原因)	Akira Toba	Naoyuki Kuzuya & Takeshi Mori	November 20, 2025
Ayame takes Hinako to the kitchen as she remembers Shiori's words. As Hinako helps Ayame, Hinako discovers that there is another face on the back of Ayame's head, revealing that she is a yokai. Shiori and Miko sense this and go to search for her. Ayame chases Hinako to the lake and prepares to kill her with an axe. Hinako is ready to die, but at the last moment, she dodges the axe, which only cuts her arm. After Ayame tastes Hinako's blood, she realizes that she has some of Shiori's blood in her. Shiori arrives and quickly defeats Ayame, allowing Hinako to see Shiori's true form. Later, Hinako discovers that no one remembers Ayame, with all evidence of her existence having been erased. However, Hinako encounters Ayame still alive due to her ability to regenerate from injury. Ayame decides to leave Hinako alone and leave, but not before they talk about Shiori's relationship with Hinako. Ayame reveals that Shiori's blood mixed with hers would make her deeply unappetizing to Shiori.
9	"A Burned-In Prayer"; Transliteration: "Yakitsuita Inori" (Japanese: 焼き付いた祈り)	Zenichirou Itō	Zenichirou Itō	November 27, 2025
As Hinako heads to school, she continues to remember Ayame's words. Hinako talks to Miko about Shiori's blood being mixed with hers and seeing her true form. Miko suggests she confront Shiori. After meeting up with Shiori, Hinako questions her about her blood being mixed into hers, and Shiori finally admits that what Ayame said is true. They actually met ten years ago, which is when Shiori gave some of her blood to Hinako as a blessing. Shiori's blood allowed her to survive the accident that killed her family. Shiori intended to keep Hinako alive, and never actually wanted to eat her at all. Hinako is hurt that Shiori kept this secret from her and leaves. Witnessing this, Miko confronts Shiori, who asks Miko to hang out with her the next day at the zoo. As they watch the animals, Shiori reveals that she sees all humans and animals as food except Hinako. As Miko explains her relationship with humans, Shiori also reveals that she also once lived among humans.
10	"Said With a Prayer"; Transliteration: "Inori o Komete" (Japanese: 祈りを込めて)	Katsunari Mikajiri	Katsunari Mikajiri	December 4, 2025
Shiori explains her past where she devoured children that were thrown into the ocean by local villagers who could not feed them. One day, she spared a girl named Azami who was not appetizing to her, and granted her immortality by giving her own flesh. However, Azami hated her immortality and tried to kill Shiori with explosives, leaving both of them with grave injuries. Shiori began seeing the world in a different way as she drifted through the ocean. Shiori eventually floated to shore and came across a young Hinako, who bonded with her as she recovered. Shiori considered eating her, but hesitated to do so. Before leaving, Shiori fed Hinako some of her blood as a blessing and protection. After discovering that yokai were feeding on human remains, she recognized the blood as Hinako's and rushed to find her, eventually locating her at Shiomi High School. As Shiori tells her story, Miko comments that she also has no family. Miko warns Shiori that Hinako may pull the same stunt as Azami and convinces her to understand Hinako more.
11	"A Cold Morning"; Transliteration: "Tsumetai Asa" (Japanese: 冷たい朝)	Hiroyuki Okuno	Junichi Sakata & Naoyuki Kuzuya	December 11, 2025
A flashback shows a young Hinako bonding with Shiori, who gives her seashells. In the present, Hinako is too depressed to leave home and pretends to be sick. Shiori and Miko decide to visit her, and Miko questions Shiori about a yokai's true nature. After Miko goes to Hinako's house, Hinako expresses her sadness that Shiori lied to her, as she still wants to die. Miko explains that Shiori deeply cares for Hinako, and that night, Miko wonders how to help her. The next day, as Hinako returns to school, she sees a hand emerge from the ocean. Assuming that it is one of her family members' souls, she swims to it to die and join them. Shiori arrives and stops her, reprimanding her for allowing herself to be killed by that hand, which is really just a common yokai. After resisting her yokai instincts to settle the issue by force, Shiori says that she needs to tell Hinako something.
12	"Beloved Child"; Transliteration: "Itoshigo" (Japanese: 愛し子)	Shūsaku Katō	Junichi Sakata & Shin'ichi Inami	December 18, 2025
Shiori reveals that after bonding with Hinako in the past, she made Hinako promise to keep living for her. Yet still upset with Shiori for not keeping her promise, Hinako cannot get over her pain. After failing to talk Hinako out of wanting to die, Shiori promises that she will someday consume Hinako at her happiest moment to convince her to keep living for now. Though Hinako is still distrustful of her, Shiori assures her that her promise is real this time. Having decided to not listen to Miko's advice anymore, they share a kiss. Later, Miko visits them, unhappy that Hinako did not show up for class. After learning about Shiori's promise, Miko decides to speak to Shiori alone. Miko reluctantly agrees to the promise after learning of Hinako's desire to die and the kiss, but is displeased that Shiori took her advice the wrong way.
13	"Warmth on the Sea Floor"; Transliteration: "Atatakana Kaitei" (Japanese: 温かな海底)	Shigeru Fukase	Shigeru Kimiya	December 25, 2025
As Shiori and Miko continue their way back to Hinako's house, Miko worries about the outcome of Shiori's promise. Miko invites Hinako and Shiori to a hot springs resort, where Hinako, who agrees to go without hesitation, recalls memories with her family. Miko and Shiori compete over Hinako while taking pictures, and they go shopping then spend the night at a bathhouse. While going for a walk, Hinako and Shiori come across fireflies, which Shiori claims are the souls of the dead. Hinako admits that while she initially only pretended to have fun so that Shiori would consume her faster, she did enjoy their day together. She apologizes to Shiori for forcing her to make the promise, to which Shiori solemnly replies that she will never forgive Hinako. They head back home and meet Miko while holding hands. Hinako quietly reflects on her future, leaving the story on an open note.
