= List of Yuri Is My Job! episodes =

Yuri Is My Job! is a Japanese manga series written and illustrated by Miman. It follows Hime Shiraki, a charming girl who presents a fake persona to all but her closest friends, and Mitsuki Yano, a girl who knows about Hime's past, as they work together as waitresses in a concept café. An anime television series adaptation was announced on May 14, 2022.

The anime series is produced by Passione and Studio Lings, and directed by Hijiri Sanpei, with scripts written by Naoki Hayashi, character designs handled by Taisuke Iwasaki, and music composed by Megumi Ōhashi. The series aired from April 6 to June 22, 2023, on AT-X and other networks. The opening theme song is "Himitsu♡Melody" (秘密♡Melody; "Secret Melody") by Yui Ogura, while the ending theme song is "Yume ga Sametemo" (夢が覚めても; "Even If I Wake Up from This Dream") by Ogura and Sumire Uesaka. At Anime NYC 2022, Crunchyroll announced that they had licensed the series for streaming worldwide.

== Episodes ==
No.	Title (Note: All English titles are taken from Crunchyroll.)	Directed by	Written by	Storyboarded by	Original release date
1	"Welcome to Liebe Girls Academy"; Transliteration: "Yōkoso Rībe-jo Gakuen e!" (Japanese: ようこそリーベ女学園へ！)	Mitsuki Kitamura	Naoki Hayashi	Hijiri Sanpei	April 6, 2023
Hime Shiraki is beautiful, intelligent and popular, but beneath her façade of perfection she is selfish and manipulative. One day, Hime falls down some stairs and onto Mai Koshiba, breaking her arm. Mai reveals she manages Café Liebe, a café where waitresses cosplay as students of the fictional Liebe Girls Academy. Unable to work, Mai and waitress Sumika Chibana guilt Hime into working at the café until her arm heals. Hime is uncomfortable with the café’s shōjo manga atmosphere and does not perform well. To her surprise, fellow waitress Mitsuki Ayanokouji treats her kindly in front of the customers but becomes cruel to her once the café closes. Kanoko Mamiya, Hime's friend who knows her true personality, frets over Hime getting such a strange job. Mai decides, due to customer reviews, Hime and Mitsuki will act as sister-like best friends named Schwesterns, which Mitsuki immediately rejects. Hime does her best to convince Mitsuki to agree during their next performance, but it comes off as pushy and manipulative and Mitsuki is forced to agree to be Schwestern. Hime becomes confused when Mitsuki privately reveals she deeply despises her.
2	"Let's All Be Waitresses Together"; Transliteration: "Minasan de Okyūji o Hajimemashō?" (Japanese: みなさんでお給仕を始めましょう？)	Takahiro Majima	Naoki Hayashi	Ikuo Morimoto	April 13, 2023
Mai asks Hime not to tell her friends about the café since having friends as customers makes acting difficult. Hime tries to help Kanoko be more assertive, but Kanoko is overcome with nerves trying to tell Hime something important. When Kanoko visits the café, Mai insists Hime treat her like a stranger. Kanoko obliviously causes a scene when Hime does this while acting as Mitsuki's Schwestern. Soaked with water, Mai lets Kanoko borrow a waitress uniform, which Hime comments makes her look cute. The next day, Mai hires Kanoko as a waitress; Hime is convinced Mai is blackmailing Kanoko too, even though Kanoko took the job willingly. Mai has them practice taking customer food orders in character. Hime makes numerous mistakes while Kanoko's nervousness actually makes customers adore her. Mitsuki expertly covers Hime's mistakes, making her think Mitsuki is looking out for her. Hime is surprised when Kanoko assertively scolds her for causing Mitsuki trouble, then both scold her together for continuing to repeatedly make basic mistakes.
3	"What Should I Believe?"; Transliteration: "Nani o Shinjitara Iin Desu no?" (Japanese: 何を信じたらいいんですの？)	Shige Fukase	Naoki Hayashi	Naruyo Takahashi	April 20, 2023
Growing tired of Mitsuki's criticisms, Hime deliberately puts extra effort into her Schwestern act to prove Mitsuki wrong and secretly gloats when Mitsuki praises her. However, after the customers leave, Mitsuki once again scolds her. Kanoko wonders why Hime is trying so hard to impress Mitsuki. Hime explains when she was in elementary school, a mean girl named Yano exposed her selfish personality to her friends who then rejected her, teaching her that people who dislike you are the ones you should impress the most to survive. Hime is devastated when Mitsuki overhears this and panics so much that Mitsuki might reveal her secret she cannot focus, so Mai sends her to work in the backroom instead. Fed up, Mitsuki finally confronts Hime about hiding her personality but promises to tell no one. Realizing Mitsuki is a good person at heart, Hime explains how the cruel Yano exposed her secret years ago. This causes Mitsuki to furiously reveals her real name is Mitsuki Yano and she was the girl who exposed Hime.
4	"I Hate You"; Transliteration: "Daikirai Desu wa" (Japanese: 大きらいですわ)	Mitsuki Kitamura	Naoki Hayashi	Royden B	April 27, 2023
Hime recalls that in elementary school, she struggled to get Mitsuki to like her like everyone else until they bonded over their piano playing. They quickly grew close enough that Hime confessed about the façade she used to make people like her. Mitsuki was happy with this as it meant she was Hime's only real friend. The other girls in their class grew jealous and accused Mitsuki of bullying Hime into being her friend. Hime would eventually quit playing the piano as it was making Mitsuki a target of bullying. Not knowing this, Mitsuki revealed Hime's façade, exposing her selfish personality. The girls abandoned Hime, who had no friends until she graduated to middle school, while Mitsuki transferred schools and never saw Hime again. Back in the present, Mitsuki is upset Hime did not recognize her, despite being Schwestern for weeks, and confirms she still hates her. Hime is still angry about Mitsuki's betrayal and hates her too.
5	"If We Could Start Over"; Transliteration: "Moshi Yarinaoseru no Deshitara" (Japanese: もしやり直せるのでしたら)	Shun'ichi Katō	Naoki Hayashi	Mitsuki Kitamura	May 4, 2023
Hime is furious until Kanoko points out if Mitsuki knows about her façade then Hime does not need to try to make Mitsuki like her anymore. Flashbacks show Mitsuki hoped to rekindle their friendship until she realized Hime had forgotten her. Sumika notices Hime and Mitsuki have stopped acting like Schwestern and prompts Hime to do so, but it only causes Mitsuki to have an angry outburst. Afterwards, Mai considers removing the Schwestern part of their act. Mitsuki later confronts Hime alone and finally learns the truth as to why Hime quit playing the piano. As such, Mitsuki decides they will continue as Schwestern as long as it takes to get it right. Mai puts them through a practice run, telling them to put their real feelings into their characters, and they manage to convincingly portray loving Schwestern again. Hime realizes she wants Mitsuki to like her for real. The next day, Sumika tells Hime that Mitsuki's outburst has received negative reviews online and many customers think Mitsuki is bullying Hime.
6	"So There's No Need for Lies Anymore?"; Transliteration: "Uso wa Hitsuyō Nai no Desu ka?" (Japanese: 嘘は必要ないのですか？)	Shigetaka Ikeda	Naoki Hayashi	Takashi Sano	May 11, 2023
Mai hides the reviews from Mitsuki while Hime decides to put extra effort into her performance to satisfy the customers. While Mitsuki tries to act normally, the atmosphere becomes so uncomfortable a customer openly tells Hime she should stop trying so hard. Hime leaves upset so the customer hurriedly explains to Mitsuki that she only meant she preferred their relationship prior to the rumors starting. Kanoko is confused about the situation, but Hime insists none of it is Mitsuki's fault. Mitsuki, now aware of the rumors, cannot reconcile Hime's kindness with her past as a liar. To spare Mitsuki, Hime publicly declares her sisterly love in front of the customers. Mitsuki realizes Hime was telling the truth and admits she loves her too, much to the customers' delight. After they leave, Hime is happy to be friends again, but Mitsuki, having meant it as a romantic declaration, becomes angry and embarrassed, confusing Hime. Their reconciliation draws in even more customers, despite Mitsuki blushing every time she and Hime interact lovingly. Sumika worries that Kanoko is visibly jealous, especially when she finds Kanoko's phone, which contains numerous photographs of Hime.
7	"It's Called Gyaru, Right?"; Transliteration: "Gyaru to Īmasu no ne?" (Japanese: ギャルといいますのね？)	Terufumi Komori; Tatsuya Hagino	Naoki Hayashi	Naruyo Takahashi	May 18, 2023
Mai announces the yearly Blume election to determine the most popular waitress, with the winner getting to create a new rule for the café. When Hime becomes unsure whether to vote for herself or Mitsuki, Kanoko announces she will vote for Hime. Sumika tries to return Kanoko's phone but struggles due to Kanoko's hesitancy. Hime scolds Kanoko since Sumika is not exactly a stranger anymore. Hime tries to gain customer votes for herself, yet she notices Mitsuki trying to push votes towards Sumika. Sumika suggests she may seduce Hime away from Mitsuki, but Kanoko jealously gets between them. After Sumika gives Kanoko her phone back, she worries she teased Kanoko too much. Hime and Kanoko see Sumika in her normal clothes and realize she is a gyaru, making Kanoko even more nervous of her. Kanoko confirms Sumika's suspicion about the former's jealousy when she hints she may vote for Hime. While Hime and Kanoko are in the back, the cook Nene points out that despite her gyaru appearance, Sumika is a hard worker. Sumika and Kanoko manage to talk about books and Kanoko realizes Sumika is not really scary after all.
8	"For Whom Shall I Cast My Vote?"; Transliteration: "Donata ni Tōhyō Itashimashō?" (Japanese: どなたに投票いたしましょう？)	Satoshi Saga	Naoki Hayashi	Takahiro Majima	May 25, 2023
Sumika recalls a troubling incident involving two former waitresses. Concerned about Kanoko's behavior, Sumika warns Kanoko her possessiveness could actually push Hime further away. After Kanoko runs off, Sumika is determined to stop her from doing anything reckless. With a week of voting remaining, Mai reveals Mitsuki is currently in first place, followed by Sumika, Kanoko, and Hime. Hime decides to stop competing and support Mitsuki as Blume Schwester, the sister of the Blume winner. Kanoko cannot handle this and impulsively asks Sumika to become Schwestern with her and win Blume to prevent Hime from becoming Blume Schwester. Despite her concerns, Sumika agrees but only so she can stop Kanoko's jealousy from going any further. Kanoko later tells Hime she is Sumika's Schwestern and will be voting for her. This reveal delights the customers who all vote for Sumika. While hanging out together, Kanoko asks Sumika to make a rule abolishing the Schwestern if she becomes Blume, hoping Hime will leave Mitsuki. Sumika angrily confronts Kanoko over her possessiveness and tells her that she needs to stop or else.
9	"The One and Only"; Transliteration: "Hitori Dake no" (Japanese: ひとりだけの)	Mitsuki Kitamura; Shun'ichi Katō	Naoki Hayashi	Takashi Sano	June 1, 2023
After Kanoko ignores Sumika's warning, a flashback shows that in middle school, she hated everyone, including Hime, for making her join in group activities. She was surprised when Hime noticed this and told her things would not improve unless she was honest with others. Kanoko's anger would eventually cause her to damage a sign she worked on that was meant to be used for a class video to congratulate their teacher's wedding, which was only seen by Hime. When Hime covered for her, Kanoko realized Hime kept her real personality hidden with her façade and lies. Once they became friends, Kanoko was able to better communicate her preferences to people and became closer to them, though not as close as with Hime. Hime and Kanoko later took their first selfie together, which secretly started Kanoko's obsession. Back in the present, Kanoko is certain only she is suitable to be Hime's Schwestern.
10	"Will You Break It All?"; Transliteration: "Kowashite Shimau no Desu ka?" (Japanese: こわしてしまうのですか？)	Takashi Ikehata	Naoki Hayashi	Toshiyuki Matsui	June 8, 2023
Sumika decides to tell Kanoko about the former waitresses. The café began with just herself, Mai, and a girl named Saionji, who was Sumika's friend and Schwestern. Eventually, they hired a girl named Goeido, who turned out to be manipulative and chose to seduce Saionji just to hurt Sumika. By the time Sumika warned Saionji, she was already dating Goeido and became her Schwestern instead. Having ruined their friendship, Goeido dumped Saionji and quit without warning. Kanoko still refuses to give up Hime. With the end of the election approaching, everyone is given their ballots, which count for 90 normal votes. Kanoko later becomes so confused she almost snaps at Sumika in front of the customers. Hime notices and asks why she is angry at Sumika, causing her to snap at Hime instead. Sumika starts to worry she has gone too far, yet is still determined to prevent romance from ruining the café again. Nene, who is revealed to be Saionji, points out that while Sumika feels she is helping, in reality she has no right to dictate who people are allowed to love. The next day, the staff all cast their votes.
11	"Blume der Liebe"; Transliteration: "Burūme dea Rībe" (Japanese: ブルーメ・デア・リーベ)	Akira Toba	Naoki Hayashi	Naruyo Takahashi	June 15, 2023
It is revealed Mitsuki got the most customer votes, but after adding the staff votes, Sumika is voted the Blume winner as surprisingly Kanoko voted for her instead of Hime. Sumika apologizes to Kanoko and promises to stop interfering with her personal life. Realizing something is wrong, Hime asks Sumika to be nicer to Kanoko. Sumika and Kanoko meet privately and Sumika reveals her new rule: once a Schwestern pair is established, they cannot break up or switch partners. Kanoko accepts this, content she stopped Mitsuki from becoming Blume. When Sumika abruptly decides to help Kanoko confess to Hime, Kanoko reveals Hime's façade and how her true personality makes her incapable of romantic love. As such, she decided never to confess because she could not bear it if Hime rejected her. Sumika promises to keep Hime's secret and realizes it also explains her strange relationship with Mitsuki. At her Blume victory speech, Sumika asks Kanoko to become Schwestern to support her with Hime going forward. Hime is happy Sumika and Kanoko are friendly again. Sumika then officially creates the rule that everyone must remain friends.
12	"Welcome to Summer at Liebe Girls' Academy!"; Transliteration: "Yōkoso Natsu no Rībe-jo Gakuen e!" (Japanese: ようこそ夏のリーベ女学園へ！)	Takahiro Majima; Shun'ichi Katō	Naoki Hayashi	Ikuo Morimoto	June 22, 2023
With the election over, Mai introduces summer uniforms but there are concerns it makes Mitsuki's breasts too obvious. While Mitsuki herself insists it is fine, the customers cannot help but stare. Hime jealously hides them by doing all Mitsuki's work. Meanwhile, Kanoko is uncomfortable acting as Sumika's Schwestern in public. Sumika later has Mitsuki hide her breasts under a scarf just in case a customer complains until Hime tells her she should not feel ashamed, causing Mitsuki proudly gets rid of it. However, she is flustered over misunderstanding Hime's claim she wants her body. Mai introduces new varieties of tea based on the waitresses' personalities, which they should recommend to customers. Hime, who has no palate for tea, cannot even tell the difference and struggles when describing the flavors to customers. After Mitsuki rescues her, she scolds Hime until she has memorized the names and flavors of every tea on the menu. Hime gets revenge by acting up in front of customers where Mitsuki has to be nice to her at all times, which both flusters and annoys her at the same time.
