= List of Jewelpet Sunshine characters =

This is the list of characters appearing in the anime Jewelpet Sunshine.

== Main characters ==
Kanon Mizushiro (水城花音, Mizushirō Kanon) / Kanon Shiraishi (白石花音, Shiraishi Kanon)
Voiced by: Rei Matsuzaki

The main protagonist of the series and both is Ruby's classmate and roommate, who comes from the human world to study at the Sunshine Academy to achieve her dream. 18 years ago, she has a birthmark on her head which is an omen to a disaster forcing their grandmother to separate her and Mikage after birth, ending her being adopted by the Mizushiro Family. She then met Mikage again during the age of 8 but later left. As she became a teenager and entered high school in the Sunshine Academy, she met him again. She is very posh, mean, nasty and also hated Jewelpets, she can get into serious arguments with Ruby sometimes due to their warped friendship, even to the point of trying to rip each other apart on one occasion (Usually due to them living in the same dormitory). But in the end, both she and the Jewelpet reconcile each other and sometimes cooperate each other onto the worst situations thrown to them. Later on, she starts to have feelings for Mikage after she tells him that she loves him, unknowingly that she and Mikage were both twins being separated during their birth.

She later broke her love relationship with Mikage and accepts him again as her older twin sibling, returning to the Shiraishi family with her real parents and her long lost twin brother. Later on the birthmark she had is revealed as a mark of being one of the Wise Ones. After she graduated 5 years later, she became the new teacher of the Plum Section.

Hinata Asaka (浅香ひなた, Asaka Hinata)
Voiced by: Aki Toyosaki

Ruby's classmate in the Plum Section and supporter, Hinata also comes from the Human World to study at the Sunshine Academy. She is the only person who can understand Ruby well, despite being confused on some situations. She is very shy, timid and is not good at sports. But she is supportive to her classmates, especially to Ruby and is the more rational of the three. She is also Ruby's former roommate, before she moved to Peridot in the same dormitory and even due to her being timid, she became active in sports thanks to her. Her favorite items were T-shirts.

Her dream is to become a preschool teacher after she graduates from college but then became a Fire Fighter 5 years later in the epilogue.

Shoko Aizawa (藍沢晶子, Aizawa Shōko)
Voiced by: Miyuki Sawashiro

Also one of Ruby's classmates in the Plum Section, Shoko is a bit of a favorable girl who sometimes has a tomboyish personality and likes candies. Sometimes has a lollipop on her mouth, she is friends with Charlotte and Waniyama, who sometimes disagrees with Ruby on some things. She is shown to have a banchou-like personality, very competitive during races and also has a bit of a bitter tongue since the first grade. Thought usually gets punished for Cleaning Duties, she is an expert on riding motorcycles and motorized scooters and always keeps her promises. Despite her harsh behavior, she sometimes shows her softer side towards some things like Rald or her crush towards Master. Her dream is to compete in the Moto GP and won in the same event in the Epilogue.

== Supporting characters ==
Masago Kuroda (黒田真砂, Kuroda Masago)
Voiced by: Ryōta Asari

Masago is also one of the two male human students in the Sunshine Academy's Plum Section. He's a bit of a prankster and a funny guy, but gets hit by misfortune sometimes. Usually he lives with Jasper in the same Dormitory and knows what he feels. He has a crush on Garnet, but she turns him down because she wants to focus on achieving her dream. In the series epilogue, he's now a movie director and works alongside Garnet.

Mikage Shiraishi (白石御影, Shiraishi Mikage)
Voiced by: Atsushi Tamaru

Mikage Shiraishi is also another male student of the Sunshine Academy's Plum Section. He is a handsome and kind boy who supports Ruby and Kanon and also the heir of the Shirashi Family, who is known for their good Ikebana Flower Arrangement skills. His family is very kind to both Kanon and Ruby but they got a serious crush on him, even for both of them trying to win his heart or protecting him. He is rivaled with Jasper due to Curry and starts to have feelings for Kanon after he tells her that she loves her, unknowingly that he and Kanon were both twins being separated during their birth. Under the influence of Dark Magic, he disguises himself as Phantom M-Kage (怪盗M-kage, Kaitō Emukage), a masked man who charms girls and steals valuable objects until Ruby snapped him back to his senses. He uses this form during the final battle.

After Episode 46, he is reunited with his long-lost twin sister, after she breaks her love relationship with him and accepts her as his twin sibling. Later on, he is shown to have feelings for Ruby and in the end, he became Granite, a Lion Jewelpet using Jewelina's Magic on his wish to be with her forever.

Komachi Saotome (早乙女 小町, Saotome Komachi)
Voiced by: Aya Hirano

One of the two supporters of Kanon, who shares the same attitude as she does. She is also Sango's roommate.

Kaede Kikuchi (菊池 かえで, Kikuchi Kaede)
Voiced by: Ai Shimizu

Also one of the two supporters of Kanon, who shares the same attitude as she does. She is also Charlotte's roommate.

Junko Mihara (三原 純子, Mihara Junko)
Voiced by: MAKO

The president of the school's newspaper club and also a student in the Plum Section. Junko is very passionate about her job, going to drastic lengths to keep students interested in her newspaper, including forging fake scoops. Her grandmother is once a photographer.

Gakuto Waniyama (ワニ山ガクト, Waniyama Gakuto)
Voiced by: Ryōta Asari

Gakuto is a crocodile on Plum Section and one of Shouko's lackeys. He has personality swings, which makes him go from his bad boy side to his girlish behavior after Charlotte defeated him. He also has a huge crush on Ruby and loves to eat her whole.

Tetsuo Nejikawa (ネジ川テツオ, Nejikawa Tetsuo)
Voiced by: Jun Fukuyama

Nejikawa is a robot student of the Plum Section who is created by Sapphie herself. He usually serves as Sapphie's assistant, sometimes being experimented by Sapphie by installing a lot of crazy contraptions into his body or changing his programming. When possessed by Dark Jewel Magic, he has a human-like head. He has feelings for Sapphie on in the end were both together in the Epilogue of the series.

Teacher Iruka (イルカ先生, Iruka sensei)
Voiced by: Masami Iwasaki

The teacher of the Sunshine Academy's Plum Section. He's a pink dolphin who walks around inside a fish tank, which the students finds it very weird about him during his first time teaching the students. He is hot-blooded and strict sometimes, he knows how to support his students during their studies at the academy. Iruka himself is revealed to be a Wise One alongside Kanon and the others. He has a huge crush on Jill and later on, gets married with her in the epilogue. Iruka means Dolphin in Japanese.

== Other characters ==
Kurara Nemoto (根本 クララ, Nemoto Kurara)
Voiced by: Nozomi Sasaki

One of the students in the Plum Section, she is a quiet girl who keeps to herself and sits way at the back of the class. Hinata and her friends suspect that she is involved with Dark Magic, but it turns out that it was just a formula for a costume she wanted to make. All thanks to her that Angela gains the ability to speak. She spends much of the series warning her classmates of impending doom regarding the Dark Jewel Magic, however she is a hardcore cosplayer who has good magic abilities.

Yaginuma (八木沼, Yaginuma)
Voiced by: Yōji Ueda

A real goat and student of the Plum Section.

Katori (香取, Katori)

A female mosquito and student of the Plum Section. Charlotte has feeling for her despite being a female and never knowing about it.

Ennosuke Nishigori (錦織 猿之助, Nishikiori Ennosuke)
Voiced by: Yōji Ueda

The class president of the Plum Section, an anthropomorphic gorilla who has a terrible temper and little patience towards the Plum class' antics. Always stressing out because of exams, Opal serves as his assistant who is in love with him.

Munata (ムナータ, Munata)
Voiced by: Shunsuke Sakuya

Peridot's ice skating coach and a former Wise One. He is very passionate about his sport and an ace who won several competitions around the world. Usually has a prosthetic leg, he taught Peridot various moves especially his signature Tornado Fire Spin. He is also a heavy drinker and several running gags about him have him drawn in a style that evokes late-70s Shojo manga.

Master (マスター, Masutā)
Voiced by: Yōji Ueda

Master is the current owner of the Strawberry Cafe. He is basically a quiet, sensitive person lying in a faint heart enough to be able to cope with every situation. Despite the thin sense of responsibility has been placed in the position of the owner. He acts as Garnet's boss. Shoko have a crush on him and reveals to be a former Wise One. He reappears again in Jewelpet Happiness, using a new updated design for the character. Master is the manager of the Rock Cafe, a place where the High School Quartet are hanging out. He has very calm personality and also likes rock music.

Dragon Headmaster (ドラゴン校長, Doragon kōchō)
Voiced by: Yōji Ueda

The headmaster of the Sunshine Academy, he's large, Western-style, red dragon. He's seen most of the time sleeping atop the school building. He's later revealed to be a former Wise One.

Jill Konia (ジル・コニア, Jiru konia)
Voiced by: Yuki Kaida

Jill is the Teacher of the 3rd Grade Rose Section of the Sunshine Academy. She is an incredibly sexy but very strict teacher who sometimes has serious problems with the Plum Section. She is also Iruka's girl of affections, who sometimes makes him go fall in love with her. Sango is always with her and she is now married to Iruka in the epilogue. Her name is a pun of Zirconia, a type of crystalline oxide.

Kameo (カメオ, Kameo)
Voiced by: Atsushi Tamaru

A noble hailing from the Kamekora household from the underwater kingdom of Dragon Land as well as Rin's partner. Looking similarly to Mikage, his human form is just a guise as his real form is a turtle. He is in love with Fukaet who wanted to be with her despite their family's hate towards each other. By the end of the Summer Arc, they both got together and had a child during the final episodes of the anime. His name is a play of the words Kame and Romeo.

Fukaet (フカエット, Fukaetto)
Voiced by: Haruka Kudō

A noble hailing from the Samehada household from the underwater kingdom of Dragon Land as well as Aqua's partner. Her human form is just a guise as her real form is a shark. He is in love with Kameo who wanted to be with her despite their family's hate towards each other. By the end of the Summer Arc, they both got together and had a child during the final episodes of the anime. Her name is a play of the words Fukahire and Juliet.

== Antagonists ==
Professor Utsuborg (ウツボーグ博士, Utsubōgu hakase)
Voiced by: Tomokazu Sugita

Real name Tautsuzo Utsubo (ウツボ田ウツ蔵, Utsubo Tautsuzō), he is a cyborg moray eel and the antagonist of the Summer Arc. He is the one who orchestrated the coup d'eat at the Dragon Kingdom in order to marry Fukaet and take over. He is then defeated by his former mentor Iruka, and redeemed himself to fight along with everyone when Jewel Land is in crisis.

Dark Jewelina (ダークジュエリーナ, Dāku Juerīna)
