= List of Yuri Is My Job! chapters =

Yuri Is My Job! is a Japanese manga series written and illustrated by Miman. It follows Hime Shiraki, a charming girl who presents a fake persona to all but her closest friends, and Mitsuki Yano, a girl who knows about Hime's past, as they work together as waitresses in a concept café.

The manga has been serialized in Ichijinsha's Comic Yuri Hime since November 18, 2016. Ichijinsha has compiled its chapters into individual tankōbon volumes. The first volume was published on June 16, 2017. As of November 2026, fifteen volumes have been published. Kodansha USA licensed the manga in English as the company's first yuri release. As of November 2026, fourteen English-language volumes have been published.

== Chapters ==
No.	Original release date	Original ISBN	English release date	English ISBN
1	June 16, 2017	978-4-7580-7693-7	January 22, 2019	978-1-63236-777-8 (print); 978-1-64212-623-5 (digital)
1. "Welcome to Liebe Girls Academy!" (ようこそリーベ女学園へ！, Yōkoso Rībe-jo Gakuen e!); 2. "Good Tidings to You, Onee-sama" (ごきげんよう、お姉さま, Gokigen'yō, onē-sama); 3. "Is This Guest a Friend of Yours?" (お連れの方はご友人ですの？, Otsure no kata wa goyūjin desu no?); 4. "Shall We Begin Service Now?" (みなさんでお給仕を始めましょう？, Minasan de okyūji o hajimemashō?); 5. "I Tell You, It's Not a Lie" (嘘なんてありませんわ, Uso nante arimasen wa); 6. "What Am I to Believe?" (何を信じたらいいんですの？, Nani o shinjitara iin desu no?); Bonus: "Club Activities are Kanoko's Job!" (果乃子の部活はお仕事です!, Kanoko no bukatsu wa oshigoto desu!)
2	October 18, 2017	978-4-7580-7739-2	March 26, 2019	978-1-63236-778-5 (print); 978-1-64212-767-6 (digital)
7. "Mitsuki Yano" (矢野美月, Yano Mitsuki); 8. "Life Can be a Twisted Thing" (波乱もございますわ, Haran mogozaimasu wa); 9. "If I Could Do It All Over Again" (もしやり直せるのでしたら, Moshi yarinaoseru no deshitara); 10. "Schwestern in Eintracht" (円満なシュヴェスター, Enman'na shuvuesutā); 11. "Who Is the Flower of Liebe Academy?" (リーベの花はどなた？, Rībe no hana wa donata?); Bonus: "Tea Time Is Mitsuki's Job!" (美月のティータイムはお仕事です!, Mitsuki no tītaimu wa oshigoto desu!)
3	April 18, 2018	978-4-7580-7804-7	May 21, 2019	978-1-63236-779-2 (print); 978-1-64212-874-1 (digital)
12. "The Blume Selections Have Begun" (ブルーメ選挙始まりますわ, Burūme senkyo hajimarimasu wa); 13. "It's 'Gyaru,' Right?" (ギャル、といいますのね？, Gyaru, to īmasu no ne?); 14. "Whom Shall I Vote For?" (どなたに投票いたしましょう？, Donata ni tōhyō itashimashō?); 15. "The Midterm Results are Here!" (中間発表ですわ, Chūkan happyō desu wa); 16. "Kanoko Mamiya" (間宮果乃子, Mamiya Kanoko); Bonus: "Break Time Is Kanoko's Job!" (果乃子の休み時間はお仕事です!, Kanoko no yasumi jikan wa oshigoto desu!)
4	November 15, 2018	978-4-7580-7868-9	July 16, 2019	978-1-63236-806-5 (print); 978-1-64212-944-1 (digital)
17. "Lady Blume's Decree" (ブルーメさまのきまり, Burūme-sama no kimari); 18. "Will You Come Back?" (お戻りになれますか？, Omodori ni naremasu ka?); 19. "What Must be Stopped" (止めるべきものは, Tomerubeki mono wa); 20. "Blume der Liebe" (ブルーメ・デア・リーベ, Burūme dea rībe); 21. "Beware! Summer Clothes!" (夏服にご用心!?, Natsufuku ni goyōshin!?); Bonus: "Yuri Fair Collabs are My Job!" (百合展のコラボはお仕事です!, Yuri-ten no korabo wa oshigoto desu!); Bonus: "Tea Breaks are Nene's Job!" (寧々の紅茶休憩はお仕事です!, Nene no kōcha kyūkei wa oshigoto desu!)
5	June 18, 2019	978-4-7580-7948-8	October 12, 2019	978-1-63236-862-1 (print); 978-1-64659-152-7 (digital)
22. "Please Enjoy Our Tea" (私たちの紅茶ですわ, Watashitachi no kōcha desu wa); 23. "What Is It You are Seeking?" (何をお求めでございますか？, Nani o omotome de gozai masu ka?); 24. "I Offer This to You, Onee-sama!" (お姉さまに差し上げます！, Onē-sama ni sashiagemasu!); 25. "I Don't Need It" (いりませんわ, Irimasen wa); 26. "Mitsuki Ayanokouji" (綾小路美月, Ayanokōji Mitsuki); Bonus: "Invitations are Mai-san's Job!" (舞さんの勧誘はお仕事です!, Mai-san no kan'yū wa oshigoto desu!)
6	January 17, 2020	978-4-7580-2075-6	September 1, 2020 (digital); November 3, 2020 (print)	978-1-64659-488-7 (digital); 978-1-63236-930-7 (print)
27. "Onee-sama's Absence" (お姉さまのご欠席, Onē-sama no go kesseki); 28. "Onee-sama's True Feelings" (お姉さまの本心, Onē-sama no honshin); 29. "My Dearest Onee-sama" (優しいお姉さま, Yasashī onē-sama); 30. "Love Goes On" (恋の続き, Koi no tsudzuki); 31. "Back to the Way Things Were" (元どおりですわ, Moto dōri desu wa); Bonus: "Playing Back-up Is Mai-san's Job!" (舞さんのフォローはお仕事です!, Mai-san no forō wa oshigoto desu!)
7	September 18, 2020	978-4-7580-2161-6	July 13, 2021	978-1-64651-079-5 (print); 978-1-63699-074-3 (digital)
32. "Have You a Moment to Spare?" (お暇いただきます, Ohima itadakimasu); 33. "Spare No Detail" (つまびらかにお聞かせください, Tsumabiraka ni okikase kudasai); 34. "Now for My Next Great Blunder" (次は上手に失敗を, Tsugi wa jōzu ni shippai o); 35. "Please Say You Like Me" (好きと言ってほしくて, Suki to itte hoshikute); 36. "It Has Been Quite Some Time" (ご無沙汰しております, Gobusatashiteorimasu); Bonus: "Encouraging Is Sumika's Job!" (純加の応援はお仕事です！, Sumika no ōen wa oshigoto desu!); Bonus: "Work Is Mai-san's Job!" (舞さんのお仕事はお仕事です！, Mai-san no oshigoto wa oshigoto desu!)
8	April 16, 2021	978-4-7580-2242-2	February 8, 2022 (digital); March 1, 2022 (print)	978-1-63699-183-2 (digital); 978-1-64651-238-6 (print)
37. "The Two Birthdays" (ふたりの誕生日会, Futari no tanjōbikai); 38. "When the Party's Over" (終わる誕生日会, Owaru tanjōbikai); 39. "The Bonds We Share" (私たちの関係, Watashitachi no kankei); 40. "Schoolhouse Sleepover!" (学び舎でお泊り！, Manabiya de otomari!); 41. "I Believe It's Time for a Bath" (お風呂いただきますわね, Opuro itadakimasu wa ne); Bonus: "The Street Clothes Review Is Hime's Job!" (陽芽の私服チェックはお仕事です!, Hime no shifuku chekku wa oshigoto desu!)
9	November 18, 2021	978-4-7580-2325-2	July 12, 2022 (digital); July 26, 2022 (print)	978-1-68491-298-8 (digital); 978-1-64651-417-5 (print)
42. "Please Regard Me" (ご覧くださいませ, Goran kudasaimase); 43. "My Dependable Onee-sama" (頼もしいお姉さま, Tanomoshī onē-sama); 44. "My Sister's Smile" (妹の笑顔, Imōto no egao); 45. "Feelings Now in Bloom" (芽生えていたから, Mebaete itakara); 46. "The Alumna's Visit" (卒業生のご来校, Sotsugyōsei no go raikō); Bonus: "Asking Questions Is Shinooka-san's Job!" (藤岡さんの質問はお仕事です!, Shinooka-san no shitsumon wa oshigoto desu!); Bonus: "One-Shot: I Am Your Destiny" (読み切り 「運命の私」, Yomikiri 'unmei no watashi')
10	May 18, 2022	978-4-7580-2413-6 (regular edition); 978-4-7580-2414-3 (special edition)	November 15, 2022	978-1-64651-619-3 (print); 978-1-68491-105-9 (digital)
47. "Nene Saionji" (西園寺寧々, Saionji Nene); 48. "Love Is Eternal" (恋はいつも, Koi wa itsumo); 49. "But I Was Being Earnest" (本気でしたのに, Honkideshitanoni); 50. "My Unreliable Onee-sama" (頼れないお姉さま, Tayorenai onē-sama); 51. "It's Just as You Said, Senpai" (先輩のおっしゃる通り, Senpai no ossharu tōri); Bonus: "Trying on Uniforms Is Our Job!" (制服の試着はお仕事です!, Seifuku no shichaku wa oshigoto desu!)
11	November 17, 2022	978-4-7580-2472-3	June 27, 2023 (digital); July 4, 2023 (print)	979-8-88933-080-6 (digital); 978-1-64651-746-6 (print)
52. "Now That We Are Together" (お付き合いしております, Otsukiai shite orimasu); 53. "My Mistakes" (私のあやまち, Watashi no ayamachi); 54. "The Two Little Sisters" (二人の妹, Futari no imōto); 55. "Move Forward, Not Back" (進むなら前に, Susumunara mae ni); 56. "All for My Onee-sama" (お姉様のために, Onē-sama no tame ni); Bonus: "Holding Down the Fort Is Your Job!" (二人のお留守番はお仕事です!, Futari no orushuban wa oshigoto desu!)
12	May 17, 2023	978-4-7580-2537-9	April 23, 2024	978-1-64651-920-0 (print); 979-8-88933-554-2 (digital)
57. "Speak Truth to Love" (恋に素直に, Koi ni sunao ni); 58. "Those We Must Protect" (守りたいもの, Mamoritai mono); 59. "To Each Their Own Heartbreak" (それぞれの傷心, Sorezore no shōshin); 60. "A Night for Lovers" (恋人たちの夜, Koibito-tachi no yoru); 61. "A Night for Us" (あたしたちの夜, Atashi-tachi no yoru); Bonus: "Anxiety Is Hime's Job!" (陽芽の憂いはお仕事です!, Hime no urei wa oshigoto desu!)
13	January 17, 2024	978-4-7580-2646-8	January 7, 2025	979-8-88877-313-0 (print); 979-8-89478-343-7 (digital)
62. "Out Into the Brilliant Light" (まぶしさの中へ, Mabushisa no naka e); 63. "Shall We Have Ourselves an Outing?" (お外ご一緒いたしましょう？, O soto go issho itashimashō?); 64. "Clawing Our Way Ever Forward" (前へ前へともがく, Mae e mae e to mogaku); 65. "Because We Are Friends" (友だちですから, Tomodachi desu kara); 66. "Up Those Familiar Stairs" (踏みなれた階段, Fumi nareta kaidan); Bonus: "Tidying Up Is Sumika's Job!" (純加の後片付けはお仕事です!, Sumika no atokatadzuke wa oshigoto desu!)
14	November 18, 2025	978-4-7580-2990-2	November 3, 2026	979-8-88877-922-4 (print); 979-8-89830-307-5 (digital)
67. Ane de aru tame ni (姉であるために); 68. Imōto de aru tame ni (妹であるために); 69. Shimai de aru tame ni (姉妹であるために); 70. "Gotō Yōko" ("後藤葉子"); 71. Kōyasai no tawamure (後夜祭のたわむれ); Bonus: Kanoko no kisu wa oshigoto desu! (果乃子のキスはお仕事です!)
15	November 18, 2026	978-4-8251-0205-7	—	—
