= List of This Monster Wants to Eat Me volumes =

This Monster Wants to Eat Me is a Japanese manga series written and illustrated by Sai Naekawa. The series follows Hinako, a girl who wishes to die, and Shiori, a mermaid who promises to fulfill Hinako's desire by eating her, but only when Hinako is at her happiest moment.

The manga has been serialized in ASCII Media Works' Dengeki Maoh magazine since August 27, 2020, with its chapters collected in thirteen tankōbon volumes as of October 2026. Yen Press licensed the series's English-language release in North America. Six English-language volumes have been released as of May 2026.

The manga received an anime adaptation in 2025.

== Manga ==
No.	Original release date	Original ISBN	English release date	English ISBN
1	February 27, 2021	978-4-04-913658-6	June 18, 2024	978-1-9753-9048-8
1. "Wanting to Die, She Waits for the Sea" (死にたがりの彼女は海を待つ, Shinita gari no kanojo wa umi o matsu); 2. "The Unknown Beneath the Dappled Light" (木漏れ陽の下に未知, Ki-more yō no shita ni michi); 3. "Sunset Beast and Festival Music" (斜陽の獣と祭囃子, Shayō no kemono to matsuri hayashi); 4. "Bloom by Night, Scatter to the Sea" (夜に咲く海に散る, Yoru ni saku umi ni chiru); Bonus Comic
2	June 25, 2021	978-4-04-913873-3	September 17, 2024	978-1-9753-9050-1
5. "Sea of Hope" (希望の海, Kibō no umi); 6. "That Which Changes, That Which Doesn't" (変わるもの変わらないもの, Kawaru mono kawaranaimono); 7. "Memories of You by My Side" (君の隣と思い出と, Kiminotonari to omoide to); 8. "Ephemeral Bond" (泡沫の結び目, Utakata no musubime); 9. "What Remains of a Prayer is a Promise" (約束は願いの残滓, Yakusoku wa negai no zanshi); Bonus Comic
3	November 27, 2021	978-4-04-914079-8	January 21, 2025	978-1-9753-9052-5
10. "Huddled Light" (寄り添う光, Yorisou hikari); 11. "Affectionate Beast" (親愛の獣, Shin'ai no kemono); 12. "Dividing Deep-Sea Trench" (別つ海溝, Betsutsu kaikō); Intermission: "The Shape of Affection" (親愛の形, Shin'ai no katachi); 13. "Clear-Skied Summer and Far-Off Clouds" (夏晴と遠い雲, Natsu Haru to tōi kumo); Bonus Comic: "Drifting Shadows of Summer" (揺蕩う夏の影, Tayutau natsu no kage)
4	May 27, 2022	978-4-04-914429-1	May 27, 2025	978-1-9753-9054-9
14. "Warm Rains on Scars" (傷跡に温い雨, Kizuato ni nukui ame); 15. "Where the Heart Lies" (心の在処, Kokoro no arika); 16. "A Kind One" (優しいひと, Yasashī hito); 17. "True Nature's Hidden Side" (本性の裏側, Honshō no uragawa); 18. "Within the Obscurity" (不明瞭な内側, Fumeiryōna uchigawa); Bonus Comic
5	September 26, 2022	978-4-04-914606-6	November 25, 2025	978-1-9753-9056-3
19. "Where Cracks Begin to Form" (ひび割れの起点, Hibiware no kiten); Intermission: "Wound of Regret" (後悔の傷口, Kōkai no kizuguchi); 20. "Unraveling at the Fingertips" (紐解く指先, Himotoku yubisaki); 21. "Scorched Prayer" (焼け付いた祈り, Yaketsuita inori); 22. "Lingering Boundary" (棚引く境目, Tanabiku sakaime); Bonus Comic
6	March 27, 2023	978-4-04-914947-0	May 26, 2026	979-8-8554-0642-9
23. "Alone, Among the Waves" (ひとりの波間, Hitori no namima); 24. "With My Prayer" (祈りを込めて, Inori o komete); 25. "Dark Side of Desire" (庶幾の裏目, Shoki no urame); Intermission: "One Bygone Day" (在りし日, Arishi hi); 26. "Setting Sun" (落陽, Rakuyō); 27. "Cold Morning" (冷たい朝, Tsumetai asa); Bonus Comic
7	August 25, 2023	978-4-04-915196-1	—	—
28. 愛し子 (Itoshigo); 29. 再構築 (Sai kōchiku); 30. 温かな海底 (Atatakana kaitei); 31. 傷付けあい (Kizutsuke ai); Extra: わたたべつ！ (Wata tabetsu!); Bonus Comic
8	February 26, 2024	978-4-04-915531-0	—	—
32. 昔日の足音 (Sekijitsu no ashioto); 33. 罪過 (Zaika); Intermission: 社美胡 (Yashiro Miko); 34. 慚愧の轍 (Zanki no wadachi); 35. 陽を緑取るもの (Yō o midori toru mono); 36. 変化 (Henka); Extra: わたたべつ！2 (Wata tabetsu! 2)
9	October 25, 2024	978-4-04-916065-9	—	—
37. 執着点 (Shūchaku-ten); 38. 花の枷 (Hana no kase); 39. 慈愛の獣 (Jiai no kemono); Intermission: 隠神刑部 (Komo kami osakabe); Extra: わたたべつ！3 (Wata tabetsu! 3); 40. 先へ、その先は (Saki e, sono-saki wa); 41. 真心の傷 (Magokoro no kizu); Bonus Comic
10	May 27, 2025	978-4-04-916495-4	—	—
42. 夏の終わり (Natsunoowari); Extra: わたたべつ！4 (Wata tabetsu! 4); 43. ニ律背反 (Ni ritsu haihan); 44. それはよく似た愛の首 (Sore wa yoku nita ai no kubi); 45. 残照 (Zanshō); 46. 夕景、その向こう (Yūkei, sono mukō); Bonus Comic
11	October 27, 2025	978-4-04-916743-6	—	—
47. 黎明、あの風景 (Reimei, ano fūkei bangai-hen); Extra: わたたべつ！ (Wata tabetsu!); 48. 瞬きの交わり (Mabataki no majiwari); Intermission: 浅む影 (Asa mu kage); 49. 知らない子 (Shiranai ko); 50. 薊が咲う (Azami ga warau); 哀話 (Aiwa); Bonus Comic
12	March 27, 2026	978-4-04-952114-6	—	—
13	October 27, 2026	978-4-04-952418-5	—	—
