= It's All Your Fault (manga) =

Japanese manga series

- First tankōbon volume cover, featuring Shiho Kumai (left) and Yotogi (right)

全部君のせいだ (Zenbu Kimi no Sei da)
- Genre: Comedy; Slice of life; Yuri
- Manga
- Written by: Merryhachi
- Published by: Shueisha
- English publisher: NA: Yen Press
- Magazine: Ultra Jump
- Original run: June 17, 2022 – February 18, 2025
- Volumes: 5
- icon

It's All Your Fault (Japanese: 全部君のせいだ, Hepburn: Zenbu Kimi no Sei da) is a Japanese manga series written and illustrated by Merryhachi. It was serialized in Shueisha's seinen manga magazine Ultra Jump from June 2022 to February 2025, with its chapters collected in five tankōbon volumes. The series follows Shiho Kumai, a passionate manga and cosplay enthusiast who befriends popular cosplayer Yotogi after defending her from harassment, only to discover Yotogi's provocative "exposure cosplayer" style clashes with her own conservative views on the hobby. The series has been licensed for English release in North America by Yen Press.

== Plot ==
Shiho Kumai (隈井 志保, Kumai Shiho), an avid manga and cosplay enthusiast, intervenes when she witnesses a woman being harassed at her university. The woman is revealed to be Yotogi (夜伽), a popular cosplayer with over 200,000 followers on social media. After their encounter, the two collaborate at a cosplay event. Shiho initially believes she has found a kindred spirit, but soon discovers Yotogi is an "exposure cosplayer"—a type of performer Shiho strongly dislikes due to their revealing costumes and provocative content. The two clash over their opposing views on cosplay, with Shiho's reserved nature conflicting with Yotogi's bold, boundary-pushing approach. As their interactions continue, their relationship evolves, exploring personal boundaries, differing subcultural values, and the challenges of finding common ground despite contrasting perspectives.

== Publication ==
Written and illustrated by Merryhachi, It's All Your Fault was serialized in Shueisha's seinen manga magazine Ultra Jump from June 17, 2022, to February 18, 2025. Shueisha collected its chapters in five tankōbon volumes, released from December 19, 2022, to March 18, 2025.

In North America, the series has been licensed for English release by Yen Press.

=== Volumes ===
No.	Original release date	Original ISBN	English release date	English ISBN
1	December 19, 2022	978-4-08-892506-6	March 25, 2025	979-8-8554-0019-9
1. "The Lonely Bunny Girl" (淋しがりバニーガール, Sabishi Gari Banīgāru); 2. "The Devilish Delinquent" (小悪魔ヤンキー, Shōakuma Yankī); 3. "The Naked Torso" (はだかんぼトルソー, Hadakanbo Torusō); 4. "The Bloodhound" (追跡ハウンド, Tsuiseki Haundo); 5. "The Goody-Goody Buddy" (ご風紀バディ, Go Fūki Badi)
2	July 19, 2023	978-4-08-892765-7	September 9, 2025	979-8-8554-0021-2
6. "The Tenacious Hater" (頑張り屋アンチガール, Ganbariya Anchi Gāru); 7. "The Greedy Cat" (欲張りcat, Yokubari Cat); 8. "The Summer to Be as You Are (Day 1)" (ありのままSUMMER (Day1), Ari no Mama Samā (Dē Wan)); 9. "The Summer to Be as You Are (Day 2)" (ありのままSUMMER (Day2), Ari no Mama Samā (Dē Tsū))); 10. "The Cramped Territory" (狭小テリトリー, Kyōshō Teritorī); 11. "It's All Summer's Fault" (全部夏のせいだ, Zenbu Natsu no Sei da)
3	February 19, 2024	978-4-08-893191-3	March 24, 2026	979-8-8554-0369-5
12. "The Cut-Off Princesse" (ぶった斬りPrincesse, Buttagiri Princesse); 13. "The Reckless Star Girl" (がむしゃらスターガール, Gamushara Sutāgāru); 14. "Buddy & Body" (バディ&バディ, Badi & Badi); 15. "The Severed Ties" (断ち切る者たち, Tachikiru Monotachi); 16. "The Opposite BUSTERS!" (双極BUSTERS!, Sōkyoku BUSTERS!)
4	August 19, 2024	978-4-08-893357-3	January 26, 2027	979-8-8554-2386-0
17. Netsu ni Ukasare Gāru (Zenpen) (熱に浮かされガール(前編)); 18. Netsu ni Ukasare Gāru (Kōhen) (熱に浮かされガール(後編)); 19. Wakaremichi Railway (あわかれ道Railway); 20. Daiyamondo Kurosshingu (ダイヤモンド・クロッシング); 21. Haru to Hinadori no Warutsu (春と雛鳥のワルツ); 22. Ai Umi Towairaito (愛海トワイライト)
5	March 18, 2025	978-4-08-893593-5	—	—
23. Sayonara Nosutarujī (さよならノスタルジー); 24. Futari Intaryūdo (ふたりインタリュード); 25. Netsuretsu Banī Sukuwaddo (熱烈バニースクワッド); 26. Gūzō Asupirēshon (偶像アスピレーション); 27. "Satellite Orbit"; 28. "It's All Thanks to you"

== Reception ==
Writing for Anime News Network, Lauren Orsini described the story as centering on cosplayers with exhibitionist tendencies, calling it unique, but noting its underdeveloped romance and potentially off-putting humor. MrAJCosplay criticized its lack of thematic clarity, finding its conflicts about cosplay culture intriguing but unresolved, making it most suitable for readers already interested in cosplay themes. Darkstorm from Anime UK News praised its nuanced portrayal of authenticity versus self-expression in cosplay, though criticized early consent issues and sparse backgrounds.

== See also ==
- Tachibanakan To Lie Angle, another manga series by the same author
