= Armor Shop for Ladies & Gentlemen =

Japanese manga series by Fumi Ayamiya

- First manga volume cover

おとなの防具屋さん (Otona no Bōguya-san)
- Genre: Fantasy comedy; Sword and sorcery
- Manga
- Written by: Fumi Ayamiya
- Published by: Earth Star Entertainment
- Imprint: Earth Star Comics
- Original run: September 15, 2017 – present
- Volumes: 4
- Original net animation
- Directed by: Jun'ichi Yamamoto
- Written by: Domeshi; Jun'ichi Yamamoto
- Music by: Keiji Inai
- Studio: IMAGICA Lab
- Licensed by: Crunchyroll
- Released: October 9, 2018 – March 20, 2021
- Runtime: 4 minutes
- Episodes: 27
- icon

Armor Shop for Ladies & Gentlemen (Japanese: おとなの防具屋さん, Hepburn: Otona no Bōguya-san) is a Japanese four-panel manga series by Fumi Ayamiya. It was first published on September 15, 2017, via a web comic distribution site Ganma! at Comic Smart. The first volume of the manga was released on November 12, 2018, by Earth Star Entertainment.

A short anime adaptation by IMAGICA Lab aired from October 9 to December 25, 2018. Each episode is 4 minutes long. The anime was broadcast on Tokyo MX and BS11, and is available on the Ganma! app and AbemaTV service. There are also three additional episodes that were released from March 6 to March 20, 2019. A second season aired from January 2 to March 20, 2021.

== Plot ==
The story focuses on the daily life of Kautz, a new shopkeeper at an armor shop that only sells revealing armor for female adventurers that comes with high stats. As the shop's finances have worsened from its owner deciding to sell items for cheap prices, Kautz has to manage it somehow while dealing with his co-workers and customers.

== Characters ==
Kautz (カウツ, Kautsu)
Voiced by: Mark Ishii
The main hero of the series. He is the one who seeks a job.
Lilietta (リリエッタ, Ririetta)
Voiced by: Nao Tōyama
A young woman who works at the shop as well, often serving as a model and test subject for various armors.
Narden (ナーデン, Nāden)
Voiced by: Takahiro Sakurai
The owner of the shop. He is very serious in nature.
Frealica (フレアリカ, Furearika)
Voiced by: Mikako Komatsu
A female warrior who is a frequent customer to the shop. She loves to tease Kautz.
Emina (エミナ)
Voiced by: Yui Ogura
Near (ニーアル, Nīaru)
Voiced by: Enako
A very powerful demon lord that takes the guise of a young girl.
Sela (セラ, Sera)
Voiced by: Yumiri Hanamori
A cross-dressing elf and occasional customer to the shop.
Mina (ミナ)
Voiced by: Azumi Waki
A sorceress and occasional customer to the shop.

== Media ==
=== Manga ===
It was first published on September 15, 2017, via a web comic distribution site Ganma! at Comic Smart. The first volume of the manga was released on November 12, 2018, by Earth Star Entertainment.

Volume list

| No. | Japanese release date | Japanese ISBN |
|---|---|---|
| 1 | November 12, 2018 | 978-4-8030-1246-0 |
| 2 | December 12, 2019 | 978-4-8030-1367-2 |
| 3 | January 12, 2021 | 978-4-8030-1481-5 |
| 4 | July 12, 2022 | 978-4-8030-1663-5 |

=== Anime ===
Jun'ichi Yamamoto directed the series with anime production by IMAGICA Lab. Series scripts were handled by both Yamamoto and Domeshi. Kosuke Iwanaga designed the characters, while the in-game characters were designed by Kyashii. Keiji Inai composed the music. The anime features narration by cosplayer Enako. There is also a three episode OVA that continues the series.

A 12-episode second season has been announced, and aired from January 2 to March 20, 2021. The cast and staff members are returning to reprise their roles.

Crunchyroll will stream the second season as it releases and add the first at a later date.

==== Episode list ====
===== Armor Shop for Ladies & Gentlemen =====
| No. overall | No. in season | Title | Directed by (Note: Information is taken from the ending credits of each episode.) | Written by | Original release date (Note: Episodes were released every Tuesday at 12:00 a.m. JST on the GANMA! application, an hour and 25 minutes before the original air time on Tokyo MX.) |
|---|---|---|---|---|---|
| 1 | 1 | "I Will Lend You the Key to the Armor Shop" "Bōguya no Kagi Kashimasu" (Japanese: 防具屋の鍵貸します) | Masato Satō | Domeshi | October 9, 2018 |
| 2 | 2 | "Life Is Armorful" "Raifu Izu Bōgufuru" (Japanese: ライフ・イズ・防具フル) | Masato Satō | Domeshi | October 16, 2018 |
| 3 | 3 | "I Want to Eat Your Armor" "Kimi no Bōgu o Tabetai" (Japanese: 君の防具を食べたい) | Masato Satō | Domeshi | October 23, 2018 |
| 4 | 4 | "New Armor Shop Paradise" "Nyū Bōguya Paradaisu" (Japanese: ニュー防具屋パラダイス) | Masato Satō | Domeshi | October 30, 2018 |
| 5 | 5 | "Breakfast at the Armor Shop" "Bōguya-san de Chōshoku o" (Japanese: 防具屋さんで朝食を) | Masato Satō | Domeshi | November 6, 2018 |
| 6 | 6 | "All You Need Is Armor" "Ōru Yū Nīdo Izu Bōgu" (Japanese: オールユーニードイズ防具) | Masato Satō | Domeshi | November 13, 2018 |
| 7 | 7 | "Star Borg" "Sutā Bōgu" (Japanese: スターボーグ) | Masato Satō | Domeshi | November 20, 2018 |
| 8 | 8 | "Pirates of the Boobarian" "Pairētsu Obu Bōguya-san" (Japanese: パイレーツオブ防具屋さん) | Masato Satō | Domeshi | November 27, 2018 |
| 9 | 9 | "Constantinty" "Konsutantin Ti" (Japanese: コンスタンティンティ) | Masato Satō | Domeshi | December 4, 2018 |
| 10 | 10 | "My Neighbor Mokuku" "Tonari no Mokuku" (Japanese: となりのモクク) | Masato Satō | Domeshi | December 11, 2018 |
| 11 | 11 | "Lord of the Wings" "Rōdo Obu Za Wingu" (Japanese: ロードオブザウィング) | Masato Satō | Domeshi | December 18, 2018 |
| 12 | 12 | "The Armor Shop for Ladies & Gentlemen" "Otona no Bōguya-san" (Japanese: おとなの防具屋さん) | Masato Satō; Jun'ichi Yamamoto | Domeshi | December 25, 2018 |

===== Armor Shop for Ladies & Gentlemen Flips the Script =====
| No. overall | No. in season | Title | Directed by | Written by | Original release date |
|---|---|---|---|---|---|
| 13 | 1 | "The Man with X-Ray Glasses" "Hadaka no Megane o Motsu Otoko" (Japanese: 裸のめがねを持つ男) | Tomonori Okada | Domeshi | March 6, 2019 |
| 14 | 2 | "Gone With the Wind and the Armor" "Kaze to Bōgu to Tomo ni Sarinu" (Japanese: 風と防具と共に去りぬ) | Tomonori Okada | Domeshi | March 13, 2019 |
| 15 | 3 | "The Rhyme of the Mad Armorer" "Bōgukyō no Uta" (Japanese: 防具狂の詩) | Tomonori Okada | Domeshi | March 20, 2019 |

===== Armor Shop for Ladies & Gentlemen II =====
| No. overall | No. in season | Title | Directed by | Written by | Original release date |
|---|---|---|---|---|---|
| 16 | 1 | "Armor Tale" "Bōgu Monogatari" (Japanese: 防具物語) | Masato Satō | Jun'ichi Yamamoto | January 2, 2021 (Note: This episode was pre-screened on December 27, 2020 at 12:00 a.m. JST on d Anime Store while the "luxury version" was released on January 2, 2021 at 12:00 a.m. JST with an audio commentary of the main cast.) |
| 17 | 2 | "The Wizard of Armor" "Bōgu no Mahōtsukai" (Japanese: 防具の魔法使い) | Masato Satō | Jun'ichi Yamamoto | January 9, 2021 |
| 18 | 3 | "Armor Reincarnation" "Bōgu Tensei" (Japanese: 防具転生) | Masato Satō | Jun'ichi Yamamoto | January 16, 2021 |
| 19 | 4 | "Flareika Beauty" "Furearika Byūtī" (Japanese: フレアリカビューティー) | Masato Satō | Jun'ichi Yamamoto | January 23, 2021 |
| 20 | 5 | "Armor Wise Shot" "Bōgu Waizu Shatto" (Japanese: ボーグワイズシャット) | Masato Satō | Jun'ichi Yamamoto | January 30, 2021 |
| 21 | 6 | "Mokoku Doesn't Pay Rent!" "Parasaito Kari-gurashi no Mokuku" (Japanese: パラサイト 借りぐらしのモクク) | Masato Satō | Jun'ichi Yamamoto | February 6, 2021 |
| 22 | 7 | "The Beautiful Armor Shop" "Karei Naru Bōguya-san" (Japanese: 華麗なる防具屋さん) | Masato Satō | Jun'ichi Yamamoto | February 13, 2021 |
| 23 | 8 | "Armor! Armor! Armor! A Chest Full of Armor!" "Bōgu! Bōgu! Bōgu! Mune Ippai no Ai o" (Japanese: 防具！防具！防具！胸いっぱいの愛を) | Masato Satō | Jun'ichi Yamamoto | February 20, 2021 |
| 24 | 9 | "I Am Armor" "Ai Amu Bōgu" (Japanese: アイアムボーグ) | Masato Satō | Jun'ichi Yamamoto | February 27, 2021 |
| 25 | 10 | "Transarmor / Lost Yxes" "Toransubōgu Rosuto Rōe" (Japanese: トランスボーグ・ロストローエ) | Masato Satō | Jun'ichi Yamamoto | March 6, 2021 |
| 26 | 11 | "Summertime Armor Blue" "Samātaimu Bōgu Burūsu" (Japanese: サマータイムボーグブルース) | Masato Satō | Jun'ichi Yamamoto | March 13, 2021 |
| 27 | 12 | "The Armor That Leapt Through Time" "Toki o Kakeru Bōguya-san" (Japanese: 時をかける防具屋さん) | Masato Satō | Jun'ichi Yamamoto | March 20, 2021 |
