= Tachibanakan To Lie Angle =

Japanese manga series and its adaptation(s)

- Cover of the first Tachibanakan To Lie Angle manga volume

立花館To Lieあんぐる (Tachibana-kan To Rai Anguru)
- Genre: Yuri
- Manga
- Written by: Merryhachi
- Published by: Ichijinsha
- English publisher: NA: Digital Manga Publishing
- Magazine: Comic Yuri Hime
- Original run: November 18, 2014 – April 17, 2020
- Volumes: 9
- Anime television series
- Directed by: Hisayoshi Hirasawa
- Written by: Words in Stereo
- Music by: Akiyuki Tateyama
- Studio: Creators in Pack; Studio Lings
- Licensed by: Crunchyroll
- Original network: Tokyo MX, BS Fuji, AT-X
- Original run: April 4, 2018 – June 20, 2018
- Episodes: 12
- icon

Tachibanakan To Lie Angle (立花館To Lieあんぐる, Tachibana-kan To Rai Anguru), also known as Tachibanakan Triangle or Love to Lie Angle, is a Japanese yuri manga series by Merryhachi. The series follows Natsuno Hanabi, a teenage girl who ends up in sexually suggestive situations with her female roommates. It was serialized in Ichijinsha's Comic Yuri Hime magazine from November 2014 to April 2020. The manga is licensed in North America by Digital Manga Publishing. An anime television series adaptation by Creators in Pack and Studio Lings premiered on April 4, 2018.

== Characters ==
Hanabi Natsuno (夏乃 はなび, Natsuno Hanabi)
Voiced by: Minami Tsuda
Konomi Fujiwara (藤原 このみ, Fujiwara Konomi)
Voiced by: Amisa Sakuragi
Iori Takamura (篁 いおり, Takamura Iori)
Voiced by: Arisa Nakada
Yoriko Fujiwara (藤原 依子, Fujiwara Yoriko)
Voiced by: Rei Matsuzaki
Yū Tsukishiro (月城 優, Tsukishiro Yū)
Voiced by: Mikako Komatsu
Sonoa Mitsui (三井 そのあ, Mitsui Sonoa)
Voiced by: Eri Kitamura

== Media ==
=== Manga ===
Tachibanakan To Lie Angle is written and illustrated by Merryhachi. It was serialized in Ichijinsha's Comic Yuri Hime magazine from the January 2015 issue sold on November 18, 2014, to the June 2020 issue sold on April 17, 2020. The ninth and last volume was published on June 30, 2020. The manga is licensed in North America by Digital Manga Publishing.

No.	Original release date	Original ISBN	English release date	English ISBN
1	June 18, 2015	978-4-7580-7435-3	January 11, 2017	978-1-62459-284-3
2	January 18, 2016	978-4-7580-7515-2; 978-4-7580-7518-3 (limited edition)	—	—
3	July 16, 2016	978-4-7580-7569-5	—	—
4	April 18, 2017	978-4-7580-7660-9	—	—
5	December 18, 2017	978-4-7580-7750-7	—	—
6	April 18, 2018	978-4-7580-7802-3; 978-4-7580-7803-0 (limited edition)	—	—
7	July 18, 2018	978-4-7580-7835-1; 978-4-7580-7814-6 (limited edition)	—	—
8	May 16, 2019	978-4-7580-7936-5; 978-4-7580-7937-2 (limited edition)	—	—
9	June 30, 2020	978-4-7580-2130-2; 978-4-7580-2131-9 (limited edition)	—	—

=== Anime ===
A 12-episode anime television series adaptation by Creators in Pack and Studio Lings premiered on April 4, 2018. The series is directed by Hisayoshi Hirasawa, with series composition by Words in Stereo and character design by Yutsuko Hanai. The ending theme song is "Motto, Nee Motto" (もっと、ねぇもっと) by Erabareshi. Crunchyroll is simulcasting the series.

No.	Title (Note: All English titles are taken from Crunchyroll.)	Original air date (Note: Tokyo MX listed the broadcast times as Tuesday nights at 25:00, meaning the first broadcast technically occurred on Wednesday at 1:00 am JST. Dates are adjusted to reflect the actual calendar date of the broadcast.)
1	"New Life!" "Shin Seikatsu!" (新生活!)	April 4, 2018
2	"Secret Place" "Himitsu no Basho" (秘密の場所)	April 11, 2018
3	"Spying and Sleeping Together" "Bikō to Soine" (尾行と添い寝)	April 18, 2018
4	"Trials and Toilets" "Junan to Toire" (受難とトイレ)	April 25, 2018
5	"Summer Clothes and Closets" "Natsufuku to Oshiire" (夏服と押入れ)	May 2, 2018
6	"Welcome Party and Water Gun" "Kangeikai to Mizudeppō" (歓迎会と水鉄砲)	May 9, 2018
7	"Meteor Shower and a Bucket" "Ryūseigun to Baketsu" (流星群とバケツ)	May 16, 2018
8	"Fish and a Kiss" "Kisu to Kisu" (鱚とキス)	May 23, 2018
9	"A Cold and Memories" "Kaze to Omoide" (風邪と思い出)	May 30, 2018
10	"Hot Springs and Ping Pong" "Onsen de Takkyū" (温泉で卓球)	June 6, 2018
11	"Summer Festival" "Natsu Matsuri" (夏祭り)	June 13, 2018
12	"Here, at Tachibanakan" "Kono Basho de, Ano Tachibanakan de" (この場所で、あの立花館で)	June 20, 2018

== See also ==
- It's All Your Fault, another manga series by the same author
