= Keiji Inai =

Japanese anime and video game composer

Keiji Inai 井内 啓二
- Born: Hideo Inai; March 17, 1976 (age 50); Hiroshima, Japan
- Genres: Film score; orchestral; electronic; video game music
- Occupations: Composer; arranger; orchestrator; pianist
- Instrument: Piano
- Years active: 1999–present

Keiji Inai (井内 啓二, Inai Keiji; born March 17, 1976) is a Japanese composer, arranger and orchestrator best known for his work in anime and video games. He is affiliated with the music production company Imagine.

== Biography ==
Inai was born in Hiroshima, Japan. He studied at the Toho Gakuen School of Music, but dropped out to pursue studio work. In 1999, while he was a college student, he served as assistant musical director to violinist Toshihiro Nakanishi on the Akira Shirai production Falstaff. In 2001 and 2002 he participated as a pianist, manipulator, and arranger on the soundtracks for the Fuji TV dramas Fighting Girl and Hatsu Taiken. After this, he began working as a composer for television programs, commercials, movies, games, radio programs, fashion shows and other areas.

== Discography ==
=== Anime works ===
Year	Title	Role(s)
2011	Kyoto Animation Commercial "Star"	Composer
2011	Crayon Shin-chan: The Storm Called: Operation Golden Spy	Composer (other tracks by Toshiyuki Arakawa and Akifumi Tada)
2011	The Princess and the Pilot	Theme song composer
2012	Kenichi: The Mightiest Disciple OVA	Composer
2012	The Knight in the Area	Composer (other tracks by Yasunori Iwasaki)
2012	Crayon Shin-chan: The Storm Called!: Me and the Space Princess	Composer (other tracks by Toshiyuki Arakawa, Akifumi Tada and Hayato Matsuo)
2012	Btooom!	Composer
2012	Hyōka	Programming & Score assistant
2012	Mai no Etchuu Manyou Taikenki	Composer
2013	A Certain Magical Index: The Miracle of Endymion	Arrangement (other arrangements by Yasunori Iwasaki and Hayato Matsuo)
2013	Karneval	Composer (other tracks by Shirō Hamaguchi)
2013	Outbreak Company	Composer
2013	Tokyo Ravens	Orchestrator & Score writer
2015	Is It Wrong to Try to Pick Up Girls in a Dungeon?	Composer
2015	Heavy Object	Composer (other tracks by Maiko Iuchi)
2016	Alderamin on the Sky	Composer
2017	The Royal Tutor	Composer
2017	Is It Wrong to Try to Pick Up Girls in a Dungeon?: Sword Oratoria	Composer
2018	Hakyū Hōshin Engi	Orchestrator
2018	Magical Girl Site	Composer
2018	Armor Shop for Ladies & Gentlemen	Composer
2019	Is It Wrong to Try to Pick Up Girls in a Dungeon?: Arrow of the Orion	Composer
2019	Do You Love Your Mom and Her Two-Hit Multi-Target Attacks?	Composer
2020	The Misfit of Demon King Academy	Composer
2021	I've Been Killing Slimes for 300 Years and Maxed Out My Level	Composer
2021	Build Divide -#00000 (Code Black)-	Composer (other tracks by Kenta Higashioji)
2021	Star Wars: Visions	Composer (episode: "The Duel")
2023	Why Raeliana Ended Up at the Duke's Mansion	Composer
2024	A Nobody's Way Up to an Exploration Hero	Composer
2025	Anyway, I'm Falling in Love with You	Composer
2025	The Beginning After the End	Composer
2025	This Monster Wants to Eat Me	Composer
2025	Star Wars: Visions	Composer (episode: "The Duel - Payback")
2026	Dead Account	Composer
2028	Ghost of Tsushima: Legends	Composer

=== Game works ===
Year	Title	Role(s)
2008	Gran Turismo 5 Prologue	Orchestra arrangement
2008	White Knight Chronicles	Orchestra arrangement
2010	Gran Turismo 5	Composer
2011	El Shaddai: Ascension of the Metatron	Orchestration & Chorus arrangement
2011	PlayStation Vita Operating System & Built-in Applications	Composer
2012	Gravity Rush	Programming & Additional arrangement
2013	Gran Turismo 6	Composer
2017	Gravity Rush 2	Programming & Additional arrangement

=== Movie works ===
Year	Title	Role(s)
2009	The Chef Of South Polar	Orchestra arrangement & Piano performance
2013	Why Don't You Play in Hell?	Arrangement (other arrangements by Shūichi Sakamoto)
2020	Burn the Witch	Composer

=== TV works ===
Year	Title	Role(s)
2001	Fighting Girl	Arrangement & Piano performance
2002	Hatsu Taiken	Arrangement & Piano performance
