= Rei Matsuzaki =

Japanese voice actress

- 松嵜 麗
- Born: 31 May 1985 (age 41); Fukuoka, Fukuoka Prefecture, Japan
- Education: Tokyo University of Science
- Occupation: Voice actress
- Years active: 2007–present
- Agent: Mausu Promotion
- Notable work: Jewelpet Sunshine as Kanon Mizushiro; Tachibanakan To Lie Angle as Yoriko Fujiwara; The Ambition of Oda Nobuna as Nagahide Niwa; The Idolmaster Cinderella Girls as Kirari Moroboshi; Umamusume: Pretty Derby as Hishi Akebono
- Height: 155 cm (5 ft 1 in)

Rei Matsuzaki (松嵜 麗, Matsuzaki Rei; born 31 May 1985) is a Japanese voice actress affiliated with Mausu Promotion. She is best known for voicing Kanon Mizushiro in Jewelpet Sunshine, Hishi Akebono in Umamusume: Pretty Derby, Kirari Moroboshi in The Idolmaster Cinderella Girls, Nagahide Niwa in The Ambition of Oda Nobuna, and Yoriko Fujiwara in Tachibanakan To Lie Angle.

== Biography ==
Rei Matsuzaki was born on 31 May 1985 in the city of Fukuoka and was educated at Fukuoka Jogakuin Junior & Senior High School and later at the Tokyo University of Science.

After being separated from her childhood friends during the transition to junior high school, she decided to make new friends and later met them at the school's anime and manga club. She regained her interest in anime and manga during that time, and later visited an Animate shop. After listening to the radio shows hosted by Manami Komori and Megumi Hayashibara, she thought of the idea of being a radio show host, and became aware of the voice acting industry. She later entered the broadcasting department, performed readings and announcements, and participated in the NHK Cup's creative radio drama section. After several auditions, Matsuzaki passed the Aniplex presents Super Voice Audition in August 2006 and debuted with Gurren Lagann. Two years later, she joined Mausu Promotion.

In 2015, she was cast as Kirari Moroboshi in The Idolmaster Cinderella Girls, and her character single, which features the song Marshmallow☆Kiss, was released on 8 August 2012. It charted on the Oricon Singles Chart for seven weeks and topped at #10 on 20 August. She subsequently reprised the role in both seasons of the anime adaptation and the Theater spinoff. In other video games, she has voiced Jam Kuradoberi in Guilty Gear Xrd, Mani in The Witch and the Hundred Knight, and Rosa Thunberg in Arcana Heart.

After voicing Catherine in Jewelpet Twinkle, she was later cast as Kanon Mizushiro in Jewelpet Sunshine, and she later voiced a schoolgirl in Jewelpet Happiness and a fairy in Jewelpet: Attack Travel. She has also voiced Niina in Haitai Nanafa, Nagahide Niwa in The Ambition of Oda Nobuna, Ayame Reikadō in Noucome, Botan Ichige in Tenshi no Drop, Nina Tachibana in Citrus, Yoriko Fujiwara in Tachibanakan To Lie Angle, and Eldry in Interspecies Reviewers. She has had minor roles in Fate/Zero, Naruto, Nichijou, Okami-san and Her Seven Companions, and Puella Magi Madoka Magica. She also voiced Nao Komatsu in all three episodes of the 2014 OVA adaptation of Futari Ecchi.

== Personal life ==
Matsuzaki is a fan of the Tokyo Yakult Swallows, a professional baseball team in the Central League. She was a columnist for Sankei Sports' edition on the team. She and kabuki actor Bandō Hikosaburō IX made an appearance at a Swallows fan meeting in Kabuki-za on 19 February 2019. She hosts Rei & Yui no Bunkahōsō Home Run Radio! (a radio show on Nippon Cultural Broadcasting's Chō! A&G+ internet radio service) with fellow voice actress Yui Watanabe, who is a fan of the Hanshin Tigers.

On 24 December 2019, Matsuzaki announced her marriage to a male Swallows fan. Matsuzaki said that she and her husband bonded over baseball.

== Filmography ==
=== Television ===
Year	Title	Role	Notes	Ref.
2007	Gurren Lagann	Bunny Beast-Woman	Ep. 6	
2011	Jewelpet Sunshine	Kanon Mizushiro		

=== Video games ===
Year	Title	Roles	Notes	Ref.
2012	Fire Emblem: Awakening	Olivie, Nn		
2015	Guilty Gear Xrd: -REVELATOR-	Jam Kuradoberi		
2016	Shin Megami Tensei IV: Apocalypse	Napaea		
2016	Street Fighter V	Li-Fen		
2017	Fire Emblem Heroes	Olivie, Nn		
2018	Princess Connect! Re:Dive	Akino		
2018	Fire Emblem Warriors	Olivie	DLC character	
2020	Shadowverse: Champion's Battle	Miyabi Zaizenji		
2021	Umamusume: Pretty Derby	Hishi Akebono		
2023	Street Fighter 6	Li-Fen		
2026	Guilty Gear Strive	Jam Kuradoberi		
