= This Monster Wants to Eat Me =

Japanese manga series

- First tankōbon volume cover, featuring Shiori (left) and Hinako (right)

私を喰べたい、ひとでなし (Watashi o Tabetai, Hito de Nashi)
- Genre: Horror; Yuri
- Manga
- Written by: Sai Naekawa
- Published by: ASCII Media Works
- English publisher: NA: Yen Press
- Imprint: Dengeki Comics NEXT
- Magazine: Dengeki Maoh
- Original run: August 27, 2020 – present
- Volumes: 13
- Anime television series
- Directed by: Naoyuki Kuzuya (chief); Yūsuke Suzuki
- Written by: Mitsutaka Hirota
- Music by: Keiji Inai
- Studio: Studio Lings
- Licensed by: Crunchyroll; SEA: Medialink
- Original network: AT-X, Tokyo MX, SUN, BS NTV, eat
- Original run: October 2, 2025 – December 25, 2025
- Episodes: 13
- icon

This Monster Wants to Eat Me (Japanese: 私を喰べたい、ひとでなし, Hepburn: Watashi o Tabetai, Hito de Nashi) (Note: also known as Watatabe (わたたべ) for short) is a Japanese manga series written and illustrated by Sai Naekawa. It has been serialized in ASCII Media Works' Dengeki Maoh magazine since August 2020, with its chapters collected in thirteen tankōbon volumes. The story follows Hinako, a girl who wishes to die after her family's death, and Shiori, a mermaid who promises to fulfill Hinako's desire by eating her, but only when Hinako is at her happiest moment.

An anime television series adaptation directed by Yūsuke Suzuki and produced by Studio Lings aired from October to December 2025. Suzuki became interested in the series for its themes of life and death as well as Hinako's unique personality. Together with the studio's producers, he focused on having the series carefully portray character emotions. The production involved recording four pieces of theme music and animating water in detail, along with close collaboration with Naekawa.

The story's themes of relationship dynamics and depression were widely discussed by critics, with several opining that the latter was realistically depicted. In addition, the story's treatment of LGBTQ themes was the subject of extensive and mostly positive commentary. The manga was well received, with praise for its characters, emotional atmosphere, and artwork. The anime adaptation garnered positive reviews for its narrative, while its production value received mixed-to-positive assessments.

== Synopsis ==
Ever since losing her family in an accident, Hinako has had a vague wish to die, but cannot go through with it herself. One day, she meets a mermaid named Shiori, who tells Hinako that her flesh and blood are especially delicious to yōkai, and that Shiori is one of them.

Shiori promises to protect her from other yōkai who want to eat Hinako so that Shiori can devour Hinako when she is at her most delicious point. Hinako happily accepts this fate. However, as Hinako finds out more about Shiori's past, she realizes that Shiori may actually be trying to save her.

== Characters ==
Hinako Yaotose (八百歳 比名子, Yaotose Hinako)
Voiced by: Reina Ueda
A girl who goes to Shiomi High School. After losing her parents and older brother in a car accident, she wants to die so she can reunite with them, but cannot bring herself to end her own life. Her unique blood attracts yōkai who want to eat her. Upon meeting Shiori, who intends to eat her once she is at her peak and protect her from other yōkai until that happens, Hinako agrees to this as a way out of her painful situation. As a child, Shiori had given her mermaid blood in return for Hinako's kindness to her, allowing Hinako to survive the accident.
Shiori Oumi (近江 汐莉, Ōmi Shiori)
Voiced by: Yui Ishikawa
A powerful mermaid yōkai. She claims she wants to eat Hinako at her most tasty point and promises to protect her from other yōkai until then. However, she actually saved a young Hinako because of Hinako's kindness to her, and intends to protect her in the present day as well. She hides her true motivations from Hinako after realizing that Hinako's hope of being killed is the reason she does not end her own life. She presents herself as an ordinary human girl and only reveals her true form when fighting other yōkai or eating prey.
Miko Yashiro (社 美胡, Yashiro Miko)
Voiced by: Fairouz Ai
Hinako's classmate and childhood friend. She is very protective of Hinako, and is often jealous of Shiori's relationship with her. She is an ancient yōkai who used to hunt humans, but learned to peacefully live with them after being captured and tamed by a monk. She struggles to balance her civilized nature with her primal instincts, and only stops herself from consuming Hinako by sacrificing part of her own spirit. Her true form is a giant kitsune powerful enough to match Shiori.
Ayame Chiba
A woman who works at a basketball training camp. She gets along well with Hinako from the first moment they meet. She is a yōkai who was once a human, having the ability to twist her head around to reveal a second mouth with a large tongue on the back. Although she intends to eat Hinako and almost succeeds, she leaves Hinako alone after Shiori interferes.
Tsubaki
A bake-danuki who comes to cause trouble for Miko. She is jealous of how well Miko gets along with humans, and reveals Miko's past to Hinako, but Hinako forgives Miko anyway. She calms down and leaves after realizing that Miko is not responsible for her loneliness.
Azami
A girl who became immortal after Shiori gave her flesh to her. Though Shiori had intended to help Azami, who was cast away by her village as a sacrifice, Azami is resentful of her immortality and seeks revenge on Shiori. In the past, she tried to kill Shiori with explosives, but only ended up injuring Shiori and herself for many years.
Aunt Tomori
Hinako's aunt who took care of her after Hinako's parents died. After Hinako moved away, Tomori visits Hinako as frequently as she can, but is often busy with work.
Daichi, Yuri, and Mutsuki Yaotose
Hinako's deceased father, mother, and older brother, who were killed in a car accident.

== Production ==
=== Manga ===
==== Conception ====
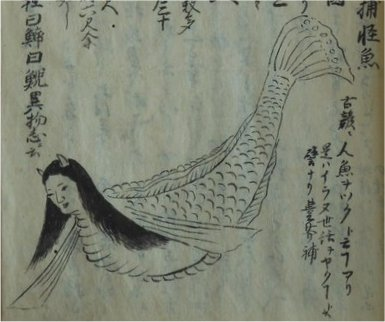
Naekawa made Shiori a "beautiful and scary" ningyo, a type of yōkai from traditional Japanese folklore.

Sai Naekawa, the writer and illustrator of This Monster Wants to Eat Me, was inspired by the ocean. She created Shiori as a "beautiful and scary" ningyo, drawing on the association of yōkai with the sea. Unlike the idealized beauty of Western mermaids, she wanted Shiori to carry an "ominous flavor". Hinako's last name, Yaotose, is a reference to Yaobikuni, a priestess from Japanese folklore who lived for 800 years after eating mermaid flesh.

Naekawa cited Arina Tanemura, a manga artist and character designer, as an influence on her early work, and would often practice her skills by imitating Tanemura's drawings. Additionally, she took inspiration from how shōjo manga artists portrayed character emotions visually. She stated that Shigeru Mizuki's artbooks sparked her interest in yōkai, and that Rozen Maiden likely influenced her decision to address serious themes with a cute art style. Before creating This Monster Wants to Eat Me, Naekawa produced fan works for Kantai Collection and Touhou Project, both of which feature a mostly female cast. She credited these series for inspiring her work's darker elements, along with Maria Watches Over Us for her interest in the yuri genre.

==== Creation ====
Naekawa sought to explore themes of love and obsession through the premise of "consuming" another person, interpreted in different ways. She depicted Hinako as someone who appears normal yet has a deep desire to die, and portrayed Hinako and Shiori as "enemies [...] working towards the same goal". Naekawa named mutual dialogue and change as being key themes.

Initially, Naekawa intended for the story to be more lighthearted, with Hinako and Shiori being portrayed as less mature than they ultimately became. On the advice of her editor, Takumi Kamemaru, she shifted the work in a darker direction. Kamemaru felt that lighthearted yuri manga was already popular and that darker themes would be more appealing to readers. He also believed that Naekawa's style was well suited to conveying an emotionally heavy narrative. Several other aspects of the plot were revised before serialization; for example, Naekawa originally planned for Hinako's family to still be alive, but decided to instead have Miko represent the story's happier elements. She also considered having Shiori rescue Hinako in the first chapter, but concluded that it would be more effective to withhold plot developments until later on. Among all the characters, Shiori's personality and design remained the most consistent throughout the planning process.

The story is set in Ehime Prefecture, a region of Japan located on the island of Shikoku. Naekawa grew up there and described it as a "nice, calm, countryside place". The manga depicts several locations from the area, including the Shiomi Bridge, the Dōgo Onsen hot springs, and the Seto Inland Sea. Naekawa remarked that the Seto Inland Sea is gentle and calm, and that she wanted to capture its appeal. During the manga's serialization, she visited locations near her hometown for inspiration.

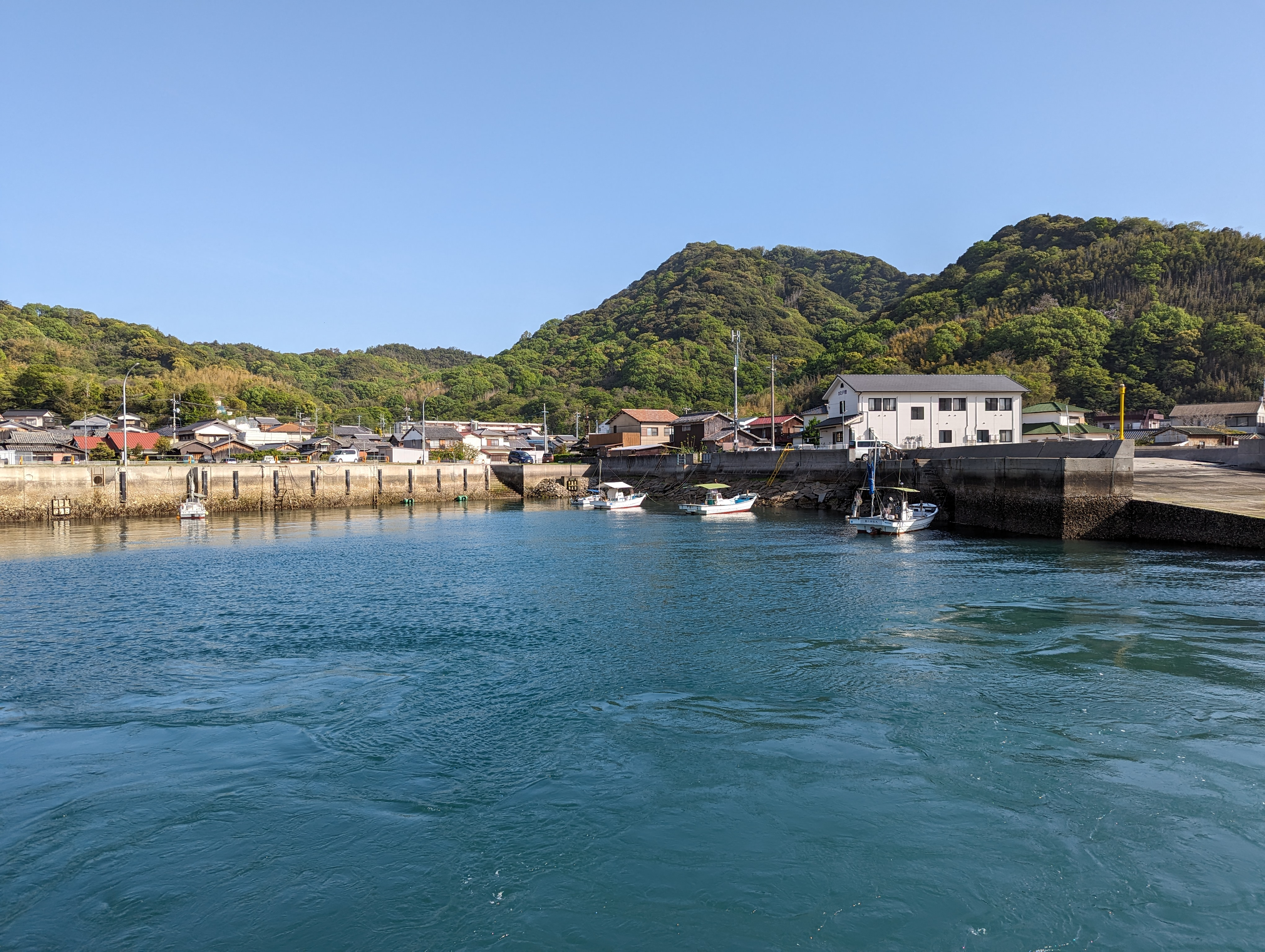
The story is set in Ehime Prefecture, where the author grew up. Yugeshima (pictured) is one of many coastal villages within the prefecture.

==== Development ====
Naekawa had mapped out the narrative's major plot points by the time publication began, and focused on connecting those elements together and developing the story. During meetings with Kamemaru, she made small adjustments to the plot, but left the overall elements mostly unchanged. She often took inspiration from ordinary events in her own life, such as a day out with friends.

Naekawa worked on the manga by herself, with the exception of tone work. She felt that illustrating everything herself was more efficient than giving directions, despite the manga's high level of background detail. Kamemaru called the editing process "smooth", attributing this to their shared vision of the final work. He noted that Naekawa often submitted her work early and had never missed a deadline. Naekawa sometimes worked up to 15 hours a day, especially once she began serializing another manga.

Because the main characters tend not to express emotions verbally, Naekawa paid close attention to how their feelings are conveyed visually. She focused on depicting details with their expressions, such as by giving Shiori slightly warmer smiles when she is with Hinako. She described Shiori as the most beautiful character and one she put particular care into illustrating. Kamemaru was impressed by Naekawa's "wonderful" ability to draw expressions.

==== Release ====
"I was really worried, so the day before the signing event, I told Kamemaru, 'If only two people or so show up, let's wrap it up quickly and go get a drink.' But far more people came than I ever expected."

— Sai Naekawa, interview with Comic Walker (translated) (Note: Original quote: "私はすごく心配なので、そのサイン会前日にK氏に「もし2人ぐらいしか来なかったら、さっと畳んでお酒飲みに行きましょう」って言ってたんですけれども、想定以上の方が来てくださりまして。")

Initially, Naekawa was reluctant to commit to serialization, as she was uncertain about pursuing a career as a manga artist. However, Kamemaru convinced her to serialize the manga since the magazine she was publishing in, Dengeki Maoh, was generally less receptive to one-shot stories.

Naekawa was anxious about the manga's reception, particularly in its early years. After attending book signings and seeing the social media response to the franchise, she grew more confident in her work's popularity, though she still often worried about it. She was surprised when she learned that the manga would receive an anime adaptation, as the announcement came suddenly, but was ecstatic at the news. Naekawa celebrated with her younger sister, who also works in the manga industry.

=== Anime ===
==== Adaptation ====
Hidehito Takagi, president of Studio Lings, was approached about an anime adaptation of This Monster Wants to Eat Me by Ena Hamabe, a producer at Infinite. Although the project would mark Studio Lings's first solo production, Takagi was impressed by the original work and felt that an anime adaptation would be interesting. He also observed that Studio Lings had previously co-produced two yuri anime series, Yuri Is My Job! and YuruYuri, giving its staff prior experience working with the genre.

Takagi selected Yūsuke Suzuki as the series director. While Suzuki's previous work had mostly been aimed at younger audiences, Takagi believed that his style was well suited for the material. To support Suzuki, he asked Naoyuki Kuzuya to serve as chief director, tasking him with handling pre-production duties such as script development and storyboarding. However, Kuzuya was unsure about the adaptation, expressing concern that the manga's atmosphere would be difficult to express in animation. He decided that if he were to direct the project, it would need to have Mitsutaka Hirota, whom he had previously worked with, as a screenwriter.

Hirota closely read the original manga, focusing on its atmosphere and emotions, and adapted the story up to the point where the relationships among the main characters became more firmly established. He then submitted scripts to Kuzuya, who developed storyboards based on them. After finalizing the series' episode count, Kuzuya focused on the pacing of individual episodes. He devoted particular attention to Miko's character arc, which he regarded as a central part of the work's appeal.

==== Collaboration ====
"The backgrounds are based on real locations, and they've been rendered incredibly beautifully. The three main voice actors' voices perfectly match their characters, so honestly, there's nothing more I could ask for."

— Sai Naekawa, interview with Comic Walker (translated) (Note: Original quote: "あと背景が、実際にある土地をベースにしているので、凄い綺麗に作っていただいてるし、声優さんのメインの御三方も本当にキャラクターぴったりなお声なので正直もう言うことなしというか")

Naekawa was closely involved with the production, since she was curious about the adaptation process. She remarked that observing the recording sessions provided motivation for her own creative work. She sometimes offered suggestions to the producers regarding the characters' expressions or dialogue, and the animation team frequently consulted Naekawa on whether certain scenes were acceptable. However, she was reluctant to interfere with the animation, remarking that after witnessing the difficulty of the process, she became especially appreciative of the animators' work. The only time that Naekawa and Kamemaru requested a scene be redone involved an important sequence where Shiori makes a promise to Hinako, which they felt needed to leave a deeper emotional impression.

Naekawa was deeply appreciative of the completed anime, which she felt adapted her work well. Throughout the anime's recording, she drew short behind-the-scenes manga documenting the production process. Although she planned for the strips to be mostly in black and white, she decided to draw them in color after being moved by the production team's dedication.

==== Direction and development ====
Suzuki was drawn to the series for its themes of life and death. He found Hinako's character compelling for what he described as her "tragic" backstory and "complex and layered" personality. He felt that while the audience can sympathize with her emotions, they cannot do the same with her desires of self-harm. He opined that this "very contradiction adds to her appeal". Suzuki identified character dynamics as a key aspect of the story, and carefully depicted each character's emotional state.

Hamabe, who oversaw general production, similarly noted the work's recurring motifs of death. She believed that Hinako's desire to die could "resonate with lots of people", and felt that adapting the story into an anime was "worth spreading" as a means of engaging with this theme. She enjoyed how "silence is beautiful" in the manga, and mentioned that the characters' realism and emotions were what attracted her to the story. Hamabe incorporated both lighthearted slice-of-life elements and more serious themes, calling them "two sides of the same story" despite the work's dark outward appearance.

==== Visual design ====
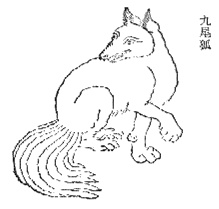
Ikuyama drew Miko's form as a multi-tailed fox. Pictured is a drawing from the Classic of Mountains and Seas.

As the chief director, Kuzuya focused on the animation's coloring and tone, since he believed it was important for setting the story's atmosphere. Depictions of water in its various forms were emphasized, such as by using the color of the sea to convey Hinako's sentiment. Suzuki felt that water served as an "emotional landscape" that marked moments where Hinako's feelings shifted. Takagi worked with the anime's color designer and director of photography to ensure these depictions were done well.

Suzuki used what he described as a "beautiful visual style" to match the spirit of the manga, and set the story in a "timeless [and] serene" backdrop. Similarly, Hamabe balanced the visuals of the original work and the actual setting of Ehime Prefecture, noting that she "paid attention to real people [and] real folklore". Kuzuya avoided techniques commonly associated with action films, such as motion blur, which he felt would not suit the tone of the work.

Suzuki praised the work of Nozomi Ikuyama, the anime's character designer, stating that the human characters were "delicately" designed, while the yōkai designs were balanced between "eeriness and elegance". Takagi was also impressed, observing that Ikuyama's drawings for Miko's kitsune form were done with a high amount of line detail.

==== Voice acting ====
According to Suzuki, voice acting was an important element of the adaptation. He praised the cast's performances, citing Hinako's "quiet strength", Shiori's "hidden gentleness", and Miko's "brightness and humor" as key traits portrayed. Reina Ueda, who voiced Hinako, described her character as someone who with "just one wrong step [...] might abandon living altogether". She felt that this "sense of danger" was central to what the work conveyed. Ueda expressed a sense of apathy to reflect how Hinako lacks even the energy to articulate negative feelings, while also making her voice become slightly more lively during interactions with other characters, to show Hinako's efforts to blend in. She noted that Hinako's gradual willingness to express her feelings over the course of the story was important to her performance.

Ueda observed that because Hinako's emotions change in unpredictable ways, the narrative frequently involves others getting involved for the worse in her emotional turbulence. However, Ueda emphasized that Hinako is kind towards others; accordingly, she restrained her emotional expression to show Hinako's concern over her feelings hurting people. She felt that balancing Hinako's stubbornness and kindness was a challenging part of her role.

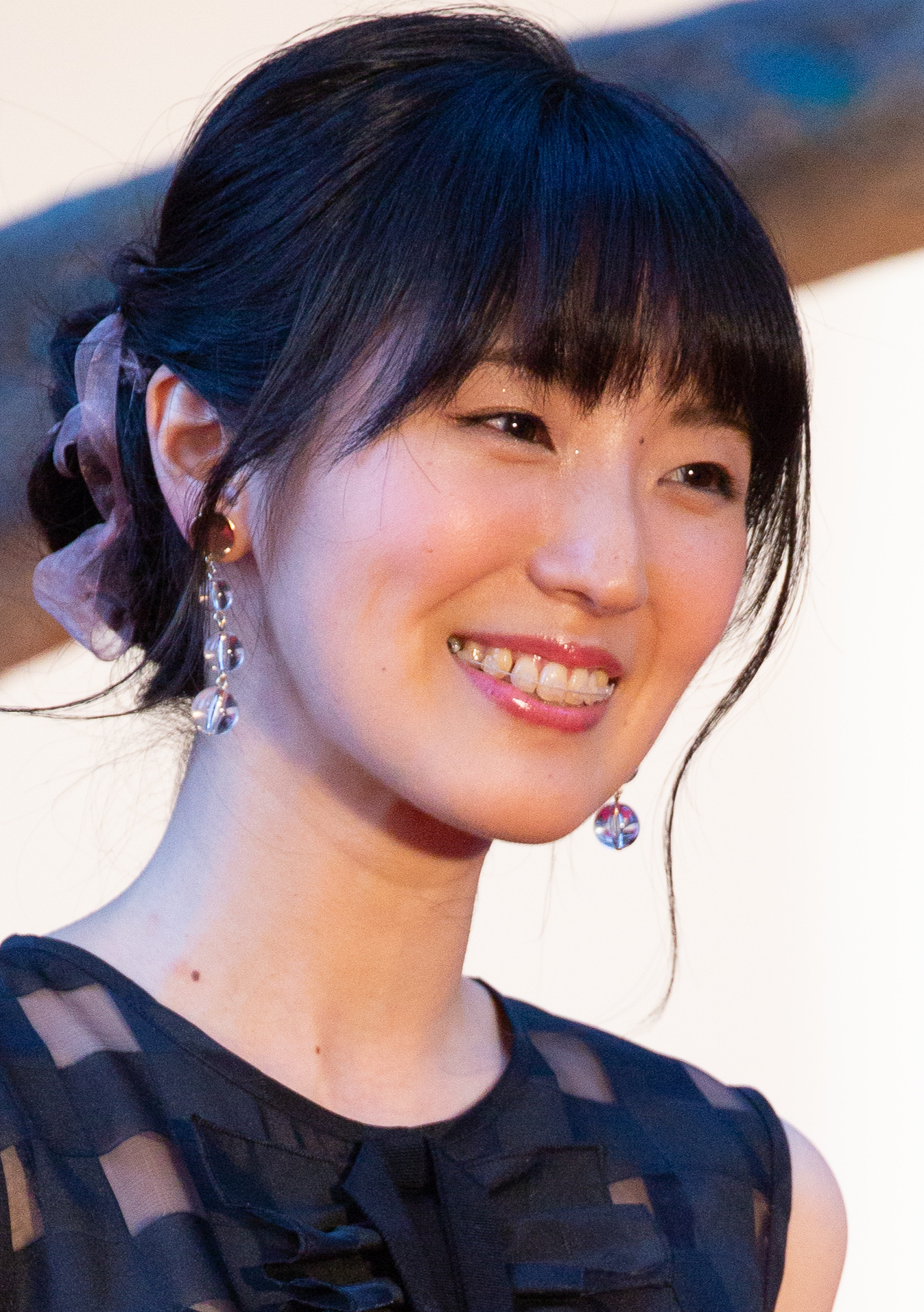
Yui Ishikawa, who voiced Shiori

Ueda described Hinako's actions as "not very coherent" at times, yet internally consistent to herself, which she remarked was typical for an ordinary teenager. Ueda typically abstained from excessive rehearsal, instead prioritizing natural emotional expression, and avoided portraying clear fear or panic, since Hinako is not afraid of death. Although she found her role difficult, she expressed appreciation for Naekawa's guidance throughout the recording.

Yui Ishikawa, who voiced Shiori, found her character's personality difficult to grasp, observing that Shiori could shift between being serious and joking in a matter of moments. Nevertheless, she emphasized that Shiori's feelings towards Hinako are strong and central to her personality As such, in her performance, she balanced a wide emotional range with an underlying sense of conviction.

Ishikawa began preparing by reading the original manga and writing down her impressions of Shiori from Hinako's perspective, which helped her better understand her role. She stated that the story carried a serious tone and dark themes, and sought to convey that atmosphere in her performance. In Shiori's initial interactions with Hinako, Ishikawa portrayed how Shiori's unfamiliarity with society causes her to struggle to communicate naturally. As the narrative progressed, she focused on showing Shiori's improvement in her ability to engage with Hinako.

Fairouz Ai, who voiced Miko, described her character as "wonderful" and someone who "makes you wish you had someone like [her] around you". She sought to express Miko's different sides of her personality, particularly deep emotions shaped by her past, while also portraying her cheerfulness reservedly rather than with exaggerated expression. While voicing Miko's form as a kitsune, she drew inspiration from the "force" and "lowness" of Moro's voice from the film Princess Mononoke.

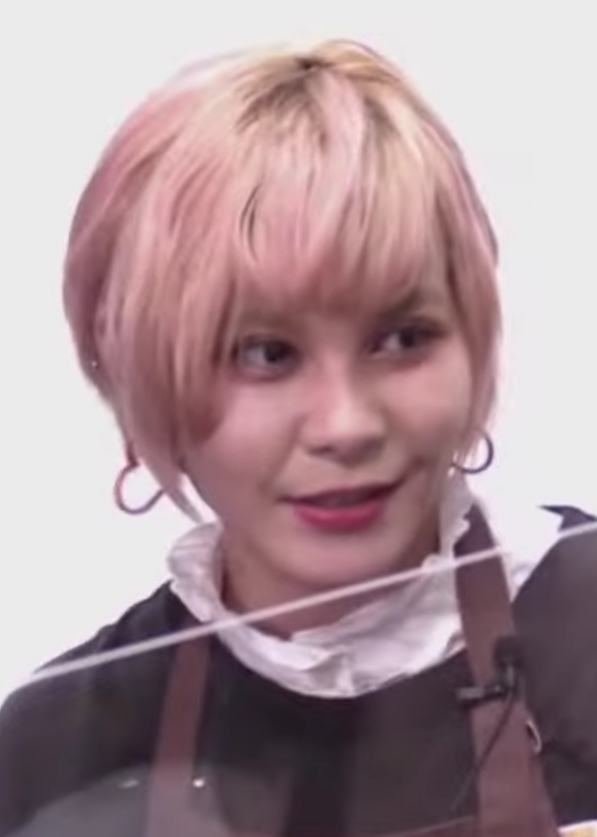
Fairouz Ai, who voiced Miko

Because Miko harbors strong feelings regarding Hinako, Ai aimed to convey the intensity of those emotions in her performance. During the third episode's recording, she went so far that the sound director told her to tone down her expression, since she sounded like a yandere, a character who takes romantic feelings to obsessive extremes. In response, she adjusted her performance to sound like an upbeat character who occasionally behaved in subtly unsettling ways. Having previously worked with Ishikawa, Ai noted that the two were able to interact well together.

Ai experienced difficult personal circumstances during much of the production, and she often questioned whether she was suited to portray Miko's cheerful demeanor while being despondent herself. However, she reflected that her struggles allowed her to better understand Hinako's character, and by extension, Miko's interactions. Ai felt that many of Miko's lines towards Hinako also served as encouragement to herself, and expressed gratitude for the work's impact on her.

==== Soundtrack ====
Keiji Inai composed the series' background music. He often created pieces to match the atmosphere of specific scenes, basing his composition on the mood of the narrative and its characters rather than following strict directions. He explained that his music's purpose was to fit the story and bring the production's aspects together while remaining unobtrusive. He found his role challenging, noting that his first meeting with Ryosuke Naya, the anime's sound director, ended without any clear conclusion. Naya explained that the main difficulty lay in determining what theme the music should communicate, since the story differs from traditional plot- or character-focused narratives with a clear upward arc. The two eventually decided to have the music convey the sorrow of Hinako and Shiori's relationship.

Inai and Naya used film scoring techniques, which involves recording music timed to match specific moments in scenes. Naya observed that due to the story's use of silent and slow sequences, scoring directly to the visuals was more effective than composing based on the script. Suzuki was impressed with the result, stating that Inai's ability to portray "emotional subtleties" allowed the story's feelings to "come alive". Inai likewise remarked that film scoring allowed the background music to better reflect each character's emotions.

Yuqi Kato of UQiYO performed and wrote the lyrics for the series' insert songs, which play throughout the story. He described his role as conveying subtle feelings which could not be depicted through words alone. Several insert songs had lyrics with deeper meanings; for one particular scene, the lyrics were composed so that they could be interpreted from either Hinako or Shiori's perspective. Kato cited the song "Beloved Child" (愛し子, Itoshigo) as his most memorable contribution, explaining that he sang it with the intention of conveying a lack of humanity.

==== Theme music ====
===== Opening theme =====
External music video
- "nie" performed by Yoshino.

The opening theme song, "nie" ("贄-nie-"; 'Sacrifice'), is performed by Yoshino and composed by Yurry Canon. Yoshino, who had been deeply impressed by the original manga, observed strong themes of love and obsession between characters. She decided that Canon's style, which often explores themes of obsession with life, was suited to the work and reached out to him. After explaining the story's plot, she refrained from making any specific requests, trusting that Canon would compose an appropriate song. Yoshino was pleased with the result, praising the song's lyrics, melody, and timing.

The song's instrumentation features classical guitar and draws on Latin American rhythmic influences. Its lyrics are inspired by the original story, both in word choice and connotation. Yoshino felt that the lyrics expressed Hinako's emotions well, particularly her despair towards her past. She also remarked that the song conveys the unsettling nature of yōkai, as well as feelings connected to the ocean, both of which play a prominent role in the story. The title of the song translates literally as "sacrifice", which Yoshino explained has many possible interpretations, particularly in the context of love and obsession.

The song is composed in the style of a ballad, which Yoshino found difficult for the smoothness required in vocal delivery. During recording, she focused on conveying the intense emotional weight of the lyrics. She sang in falsetto for much the song; though she initially considered lowering the key, she decided that the higher pitch helped convey the song's beauty and harmonized with its string instrumentation. In addition, Yoshino approached each section of the song with distinct intentions; in the verse, she evoked Hinako's contemplation of her past, while in the pre-chorus, she emphasized Hinako's pain and grief. She noted that the chorus has several phrases that relate to despair, which Yoshino intentionally sang as if struggling to get through them while conveying Hinako's feelings of hopelessness.

The music video for "nie" features drawings by Hamumelon, whom Yoshino selected so that the music video's style would match the song's dynamism. The video was produced by Fujinoe; Yoshino was pleased by the result, but asked that the Japanese text be arranged vertically instead of horizontally, following traditional manga conventions, to draw the viewer's attention.

===== Ending theme =====
External music videos
- "Lily" performed by Reina Ueda
- "Lily" performed by Yui Ishikawa

The ending theme song, "Lily" (リリィ, Rirī), is performed by Reina Ueda and composed by Yūho Kitazawa. The song's producer, Nao Watanabe, commissioned Kitazawa because she was impressed at how Kitazawa had studied the story of Sorairo Utility before composing its music. While composing "Lily", Kitazawa read the original story and listened to Ueda's lines from the anime trailer. She aligned the mood of the music with Hinako's emotional state and wrote the lyrics from the perspective of Hinako addressing herself, such as with lines where Hinako reflects on her desire to live. Instead of following a formal lyric-writing process, she based the song off snippets that came to her naturally during her daily life. Watanabe was pleased with the final result and only made minor adjustments, such as the addition of an introductory melody and drum fills. Additionally, since the song was slightly over the maximum allowed length, the tempo was increased slightly, while the song's key was lowered at Ueda's request so that she could better express Hinako's nuances.

Ueda recorded the song after production for the main series had already been underway for some time, and was surprised at how the song seemed more upbeat than she had expected. She focused on expressing her character's feelings rather than following her own personal singing style, but also tried to sing naturally rather than imitating her voice from the show. She sang the verse and pre-chorus sections from a detached perspective, transitioning to a more hopeful and emotional expression in the chorus. She explained that chorus section was particularly challenging because Hinako's idea of hope differs from ordinary people.

For the 11th episode, a different version of the ending theme was recorded, featuring vocals by Yui Ishikawa. By the time she performed "Lily", she understood her character deeply, and looked for moments that reflected emotions that Shiori shared, even though the lyrics were written from Hinako's perspective.. She aimed to balance between matching Ueda's performance and expressing Shiori's own unique feelings. Ishikawa felt that despite Shiori's carefree appearance, she has a strong sense of loneliness, which she sought to convey through her performance.

===== Special ending theme =====
External music videos
- "I could be your Sun?" performed by Fairouz Ai.
- "I could be your Sun? performed by Fairouz Ai, full-length version.

For the 4th episode, a special ending theme titled "I could be your Sun?" (太陽、なってあげよっか?, Taiyō, Natte Ageyokka?) was created. The song prominently features Miko's character, with vocals by Fairouz Ai, lyrics by Sasa Andō, and composition by John Kanda. Because the song focuses on Miko, Andō and Kanda studied her character carefully to ensure the music would remain faithful to her portrayal in the original story.

The decision to commission the song was made at the last minute, giving Andō and Kanda only two days to produce it. They began by making the song denpa, intentionally strange yet catchy music, at the suggestion of Naekawa. Kanda composed the central melody quickly; he then worked on the song's instrumentation, since denpa songs typically feature a wide range of sound timbre. He combined rhythmic elements from older denpa songs with modern hyperpop influences. From there, Andō wrote the lyrics to convey Miko's bright personality and complement the music, which she felt already set a bright mood. She mixed slang expressions with older-fashioned speaking patterns, showing how Miko has adapted to the modern world despite having lived for centuries. For the chorus, Andō drew inspiration from the imagery of Miko being as bright as the sun. At the request of Watanabe, the theme song's director, she added a moment for a brief spoken line for Miko right before the chorus.

Due to the song's high number of backing vocals and harmonies, the recording session's pacing was tight. Ai was also surprised at the choice of song, since she had expected a ballad-style song like "Lily". However, after listening to the track and reading the lyrics, she felt that it fit Miko's character well. She approached her performance as if delivering Miko's lines normally, but with an added melody. Rather than acting as if she was addressing Hinako or Shiori, she sang as if speaking directly to the song's listeners, since she wanted the song to make people happy. Ai initially tried to match the song's rhythm, but at the advice of Mamoru, she adopted a more natural cadence. Ai worked closely with Mamoru to refine her performance based on what aspects worked well.

The accompanying music video was directed by INPINE. Prior to production, he repeatedly listened to the original song to ensure the animation would fit the music. He also received detailed instructions from Watanabe for the visuals and was asked to incorporate stylistic influences from Niconico MAD videos, a type of mixed-media animation often compared to AMVs. To emphasize Miko's cheerful personality, INPINE included a drawing of Miko by Ai along with chibi visuals of Miko dancing. He also incorporated scenes from previous episodes and illustrations by Naekawa. The video's design was partially influenced by K-pop music videos, using a mix of retro aesthetics and modern technology, while a scene where Miko spins around while holding her phone was compared by INPINE to Tomoyo from Cardcaptor Sakura. Due to time constraints, only part of the music video was shown in the anime; the full-length version contains additional scenes meant to show different sides of Miko's personality.

== Themes and commentary ==
=== Relationship dynamics ===
Many critics analyzed Hinako and Shiori's relationship. Kaiser opined that the show explored the conflict between the "desire to subsume" into another person versus the "mature realization" of respecting individual independence. Sylvia Jones of Anime News Network (ANN) suggested that Shiori and Hinako's relationship is tied together by a "contradictory set of impulses", with Hinako struggling to break out of circular thought patterns and Shiori being unable to fully understand Hinako.

Caitlin Moore of ANN compared the show favorably to Black Bird for its portrayal of power dynamics; she argued that rather than Shiori having "institutional control" of Hinako like in Black Bird, the girls are "peers" and Shiori merely "promis[es] Hinako the sweet release of death". She felt that this ultimately made their relationship something she could "understand and connect to". Similarly, Jones contended that while the story portrays Shiori as being predatory, which she noted was a problematic trope in relation to lesbian relationships, the nature of their relationship avoided the gendered power dynamics present within patriarchal society.

Critics interpreted Hinako and Miko's relationship in various ways. Jones contended that while Miko's connection to Hinako is partially motivated by guilt for failing to protect Hinako's family, her feelings can also be seen as genuine affection. She noted that in traditional folklore, kitsune are known for disguising themselves as humans to pursue love, and opined that Miko's character perhaps references such stories. On the other hand, Ayishah Toma of Gazettely argued that Miko wants to pull Hinako "within the bounds of human society", with her and Shiori's differing visions of Hinako's future conveying the theme of how "vulnerable people become objects in other people's narratives".

Jones also argued that Miko's conflict between her primal nature and feelings for Hinako put her "at odds with herself", forcing her to "neuter her powers as a profession of love". Jones suggested that this action was meant to convey social issues regarding queer existence and relationships, with Miko believing she is a "monster" who has to restrain herself before being able to experience love.

=== Depression ===
The show's portrayal of depression was widely discussed. Bolts of ANN felt that the show created a realistic impression of depression, such by showing Hinako's difficulty functioning in everyday life and her intense emotions. Léonard Fougère of IGN France likewise praised the show for its depiction of depression, arguing that it was rare for media to address the condition as directly and accurately as it did. Both Bolts and Fougère noted that the show portrays Hinako's attempts to appear normal despite her internal suffering, which was suggested by Fougère as being an under-recognized reality of depression.

Alex Henderson of Anime Feminist contended that Hinako is intentionally portrayed as lacking agency as a way to convey her depressive traits. They opined that the story allowed Hinako to gain autonomy by the "delicious irony" of trying to become happier so that she can die. Henderson argued that Hinako's characterization allowed the show to explore themes such as the morality of saving someone who does not want to be saved.

Several critics commented on the complexity of the show's representation of suicidal ideation. Vrai Kaiser of Anime Feminist regarded the show's portrayal as grounded, writing that Hinako's "nonchalant joy at the thought of death" conveyed her "passive suicidality". Ken Pueyo of Anime Corner noted the "moral dilemma" the show created between Hinako's own agency as well as the viewer's desire for her to live.

=== Visual elements ===
Reviewers commented on the use of the ocean as a recurring emotional motif, with several interpreting it as a visual metaphor for depression. Bolts stated that the show's use of "drowning" was a "perfect visual representation" of Hinako's feelings, while Richard Eisenbeis of ANN felt that the underwater shots conveyed Hinako's "disconnected and listless" state. Toma noted that many scenes were stylized as if filmed through an underwater lens, which he suggested creates emotional distance between Hinako and others.

The show's use of water as a visual metaphor to convey emotions was widely discussed, and a subject of focus during production.

Toma observed that the show's cinematography relies on "stagnant" shots and frame blending, which he suggested creates a "dreamlike state [...] trapped in a loop of memory". He also remarked on the animation's highly stylized visual contrast, which serves as comparison between Hinako's depressed state and her vibrant surroundings.

The anime incorporates white lilies, which are traditionally associated with the yuri genre, as a visual element. Toma argued that in the context of the story, it also symbolizes a loss of innocence. Similarly, while analyzing the story's horror scenes, Toma observed that visual violence is minimized, which allowed the story to focus on its psychological elements rather than traditionally disturbing visuals associated with the horror genre. Henderson concurred, opining that the "real horror element" of the story was in its emotional portrayals, rather than its monsters.

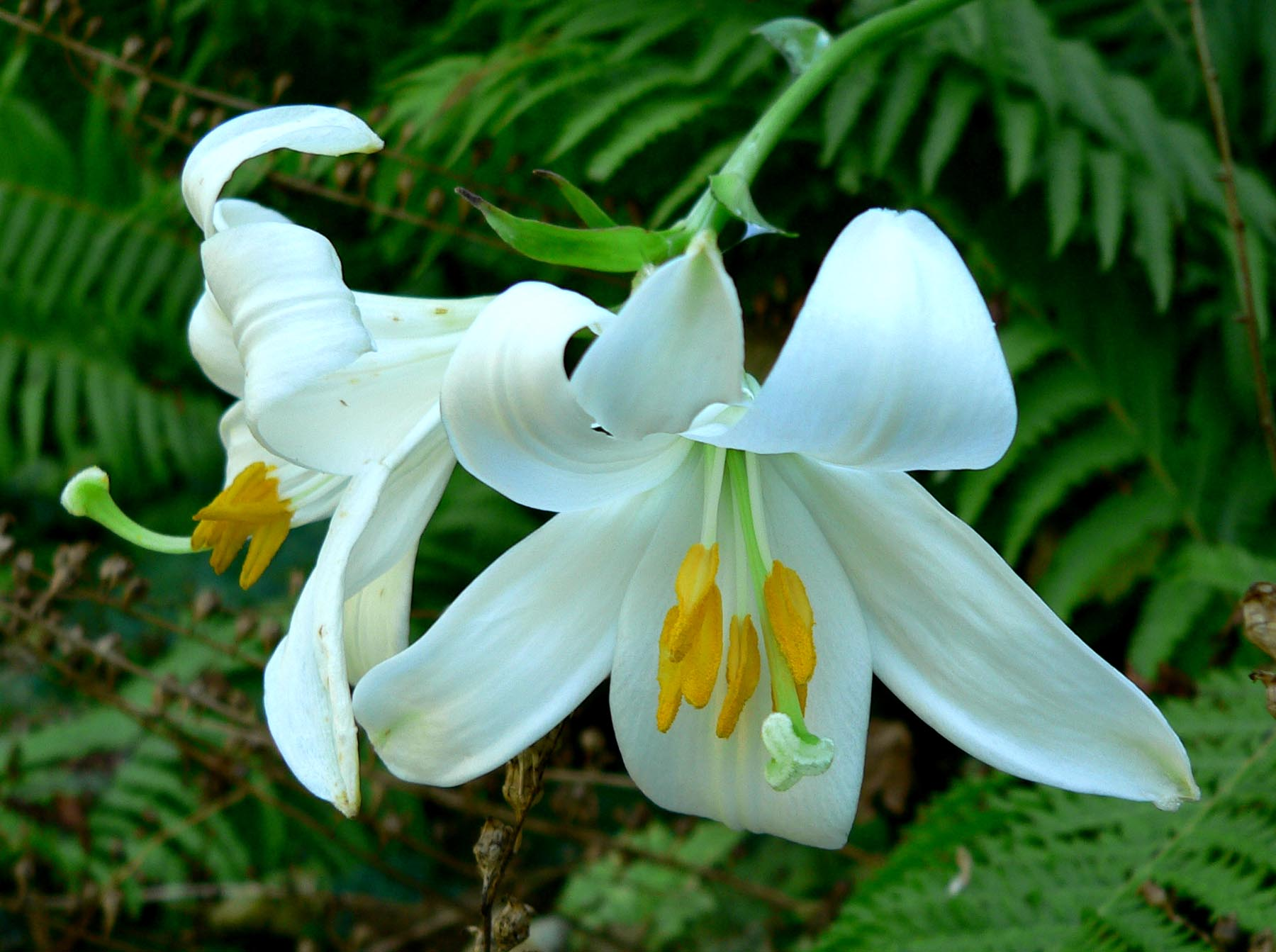
The anime features repeated imagery of white lilies, which are associated with the yuri genre.

=== LGBTQ representation in media ===
The story's representation of lesbian elements between Hinako and Shiori was analyzed by several reviewers within the context of LGBTQ representation in media. David Opie, a speaker on panels regarding LGBTQ representation, opined that despite the story's nontraditional romantic structure, it "creates something delicate and even beautiful out of [its] monstrous urges". He contended that with queerness "long be[ing] othered", it was natural that "horror often resonates with queer audiences precisely because we find ourselves drawn to and even identifying with the monsters that society rejects."

Eljiah Gonzalez of Paste described the anime as a "decidedly uncomfortable, horror-tinged portrayal of queerness". He argued that at a surface level, its portrayal of suicidal ideation seemed to evoke "parallels between queerness and [taboo] acts", which intentionally makes the viewer confront discomfort that "mimics what those with [...] homophobia may feel towards queer media". However, he continued that the deeper meaning of the story had to do with "looking past veneers"—by first creating discomfort then showing a "heartfelt" relationship, Gonzalez opined that the work "assert[s] that these initial reservations are unfounded."

Gonzalez also referenced communication scholar Cedric Clark's 1969 paper that identified four stages of minority representation in media: non-recognition, ridicule, regulation, and respect. Gonzalez observed that the final stage involves showing minorities with "the full range of human complexities". He contended that the show's representation of minority characters as "complex" and being in "uncomfortable situations" was a sign of a "healthy" media landscape. Furthermore, he interpreted the show as addressing real-world social issues regarding same-sex relationships, writing that it was "cathartic" for it to "affirm the inevitability of certain uphill battles and unpleasant situations", particularly in the context of the limited rights of same-sex couples in Japan.

Comparing This Monster Wants to Eat Me to The Summer Hikaru Died, Isaiah Colbert of Gizmodo praised its take on queer representation within the horror genre. He argued that rather than "check[ing] a box to diversify the genre", the show "deepened it". Furthermore, through its genre combined with examining themes of "grief, desire, identity, and survival" through "queer lenses", he saw it as an example of "challenging norms" of how people are seen and identified.

== Media ==
=== Manga ===
Written and illustrated by Sai Naekawa, This Monster Wants to Eat Me has been serialized in ASCII Media Works' Dengeki Maoh magazine since August 27, 2020. The series has been collected in thirteen tankōbon volumes as of October 2026. The series is licensed for an English release in North America by Yen Press. Six English-language volumes have been released as of September 2026.

=== Anime ===
An anime television series adaptation was announced on October 21, 2024. It is produced by Studio Lings with Infinite handling general production, and directed by Yūsuke Suzuki, with Naoyuki Kuzuya serving as chief director, Mitsutaka Hirota writing the scripts, Sō Ikuyama designing the characters, and Keiji Inai composing the music. The series aired from October 2 to December 25, 2025, on AT-X and other networks. The opening theme song is "nie" ("贄-nie-"; 'Sacrifice'), performed by Yoshino, while the ending theme song is "Lily" (リリィ, Rirī), performed by Reina Ueda as her character Hinako Yaotose. Crunchyroll is streaming the series. Medialink licensed the series in Southeast Asia.

Hiromi Sueda, a member of the production committee, explained that the anime's international promotion was meant to appeal to a broad audience. Because of this, the publicity campaign emphasized the work's dark fantasy aspects rather than solely the yuri ones, such as by including visuals of Shiori's half-yōkai form. In addition, several teaser visuals were created for the anime. Since the first teaser was used for a long time, the production team consulted extensively on how to best create it. Takagi was particularly proud of this initial visual, since it features detailed animations of water.

== Reception ==
=== Manga ===
==== Critical reception ====
The story's premise was generally well-received. Rebecca Silverman of Anime News Network (ANN) enjoyed the unusual genre combination of yuri and horror, stating that it "worked better than it should" and addressed heavy themes well. Similarly, Erica Friedman of Okazu gave the first volume an 8/10 despite remarking on her personal dislike of horror; she praised the "intriguing and dark" story, acclaiming the "breathtakingly excellent" end scene and the "tight" narrative pacing.

The series's character writing was commended by several critics. Jenni Lada of Siliconera praised Shiori's moral ambiguity, calling her introduction to Hinako an "incredible setup" for Shiori's character. Friedman likewise praised the character writing, giving it an 8/10 and describing Shiori's dialogue as "exceptional". Nakato of Manga News felt that Hinako and Shiori's relationship was deeply affecting due to the unique dynamic between the two girls.

Several reviewers found the story's emotional atmosphere to be well done. Koiwai of Manga News acclaimed the work's depiction of melancholy and indifference, which he compared to the works of the French poet Charles Baudelaire. Adam Symchuk of Asian Movie Pulse described the manga as a "dark and disturbing" story with "sincerely portrayed [...] malaise and confusion".

The art style received particular praise. Silverman commended the "pretty" and "appealing" illustrations as well as the distinctive character designs, while Friedman stated that the art worked "beautifully". Symchuk described the art as "straightforward" yet able to "skillfully capture" emotions with "consistently stunning and disturbing visuals".

=== Anime ===
==== Critical reception ====
Reviews for the early episodes were generally positive. Friedman, who had previously reviewed the manga's first three volumes, acclaimed the anime as a "beautiful, atmospheric, dark, [and] immensely sad" adaptation, giving it a perfect 10/10 rating. Chris Beveridge of The Fandom Post gave an overall "A-" grade for the premiere, writing that the premise was "beautifully executed". Ken Pueyo of Anime Corner acclaimed the first episode as a "hauntingly beautiful debut", naming the show as perhaps "one of the most unique series of the season".

The series's exploration of heavy themes was commented positively on by several critics. Léonard Fougère of IGN France described the series as standing out for the realism of its emotional portrayals, though he found it a difficult experience at times. Following the series's conclusion, Alex Henderson of Anime Feminist recommended the series in a shortlist of Fall 2025 anime, praising the story's depiction of Hinako's mental health struggles, though they also found it to "[not] be an easy watch".

Several reviewers praised the story's characters. Henderson commended Hinako's character arc, particularly its exploration of her motivations to live, as well as her "deliciously messy" relationship with Shiori. Beveridge was enthused with the series for being a "rare" show that depicted genuine character growth and concluded it was "one of the better quiet shows" of 2025.

The animation and its pacing was divisive, with several critics feeling that it was excessively slow and others arguing that it was a strong visual representation of the story. Caitlin Moore of ANN felt that the animation, though "brilliant at a glance", was often repetitive. In contrast, Pueyo opined that the "ethereal beauty" of the animation contributed to a "dreamlike" yet "unsettling" mood. Similarly, Fougère stated that the show's pacing fit well with Hinako's emotional state and was consistently strong in visual quality.

The anime's other production aspects were generally well received. Rebecca Silverman of ANN, ranking the show as the 6th-best anime of Fall 2025, named the "quietly stunning" voice acting as one of its strongest traits, while Pueyo described Reina Ueda's performance as Hinako as "chilling in its restraint". Meanwhile, Kaiser praised the sound design as "nicely evocative" and blending in well with scenes, while Jones called the background music "lovely and frequently beautiful".
