= Studio Lings =

Japanese animation studio

STUDIO LINGS,Inc.
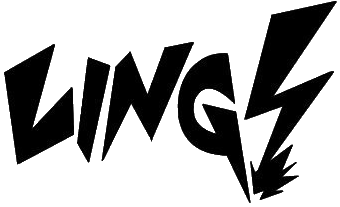
- Native name: 株式会社スタジオリングス
- Romanized name: Kabushiki-gaisha Sutajio Ringusu
- Type: Kabushiki-gaisha
- Industry: Japanese animation
- Founded: July 2014; 12 years ago
- Headquarters: Tanashichō, Nishitokyo, Tokyo, Japan
- Number of locations: 2
- Key people: Hidehito Takagi (president)
- Total equity: ¥3,000,000
- Number of employees: 50
- Website: www.studiolings.co.jp

Studio Lings (Japanese: 株式会社スタジオリングス, Hepburn: Kabushiki-gaisha Sutajio Ringusu) is a Japanese animation studio based in Nishitokyo, Tokyo founded in 2014 by Hidehito Takagi after the closure of Studio Izena.

== Works ==
=== Television series ===
Title	Director(s)	First run start date	First run end date	Eps	Note(s)	Ref(s)
Tachibanakan To Lie Angle	Hisayoshi Hirasawa	April 4, 2018	June 20, 2018	12	Based on a manga by Merryhachi. Co-produced with Creators in Pack.	
Yuri Is My Job!	Takahiro Majima; Hijiri Sanpei	April 6, 2023	June 22, 2023	12	Based on a manga by Miman. Co-produced with Passione.	
This Monster Wants to Eat Me	Naoyuki Kuzuya; Yūsuke Suzuki	October 2, 2025	December 25, 2025	13	Based on a manga by Sai Naekawa.	
The Final-Boss Prince Is Somehow Obsessed with the Chubby Villainess: Reincarnated Me	Naoyuki Kuzuya	January 2027	TBA	TBA	Based on a manga by Kotoko and Kaname Hanamiya.	

=== Films ===
Title	Director(s)	Release date	Runtime	Note(s)	Ref(s)
Ōmuro-ke: Dear Sisters	Naoyuki Tatsuwa	February 2, 2024	43 minutes	Based on a manga by Namori. Co-produced with Passione.	
Ōmuro-ke: Dear Friends	Naoyuki Tatsuwa	June 21, 2024	43 minutes	Sequel to Ōmuro-ke: Dear Sisters. Co-produced with Passione.	
