= Yuri Is My Job! =

Japanese yuri manga written and illustrated by Miman

- First tankōbon volume cover, featuring Mitsuki Yano as Mitsuki Ayanokouji (left) and Hime Shiraki as Hime Shirasagi (right)

私の百合はお仕事です! (Watashi no Yuri wa Oshigoto Desu!)
- Genre: Comedy, yuri
- Manga
- Written by: Miman
- Published by: Ichijinsha
- English publisher: NA: Kodansha USA
- Magazine: Comic Yuri Hime
- Original run: November 18, 2016 – present
- Volumes: 15
- Anime television series
- Directed by: Hijiri Sanpei; Takahiro Majima (Note: Chief episode director (チーフ演出))
- Produced by: Naruki Fukuya; Kayo Fukuda; Shougo Ikenori; Takashi Jinguuji; Yuuki Konishi; Norihiro Kurosawa; Takema Okamura; Hiroyasu Oyama; Fumihiro Ozawa; Tomoko Shibuya; Natsumi Tamura; Yuuki Uchiyama
- Written by: Naoki Hayashi
- Music by: Megumi Ōhashi
- Studio: Passione; Studio Lings
- Licensed by: Crunchyroll
- Original network: AT-X, Tokyo MX, BS Fuji, BS NTV
- Original run: April 6, 2023 – June 22, 2023
- Episodes: 12
- Television drama
- Directed by: Daiki Nakayama
- Written by: Nishioka To Neil
- Original network: Tatedora
- Original run: Q2 2027 – scheduled
- icon

Yuri Is My Job! (Japanese: 私の百合はお仕事です!, Hepburn: Watashi no Yuri wa Oshigoto Desu!) is a Japanese yuri manga written and illustrated by Miman. It has been serialized in Ichijinsha's Comic Yuri Hime since November 2016, and is licensed in English by Kodansha USA as the company's first yuri release. An anime television series adaptation by Passione and Studio Lings aired from April to June 2023. A short-form web drama adaptation is set to premiere in Q2 2027.

== Plot ==
Hime Shiraki is a high school girl who deeply cares about her image as a sweet, helpful princess but on the inside only cares about herself. So when she accidentally injures a café manager named Mai Koshiba, she is willing to cover some shifts to keep her façade intact. Hime ends up working as a waitress at a place that is part café, part theater, where all the waitresses pretend to be students at a fictional all-girls boarding school known as Liebe Girls Academy. Hime finds herself drawn to another waitress at the café, who in front of the customers gives Hime love and devotion like she has never known. However, behind the scenes, the girl seems to hate her guts.

== Characters ==
The following names represent a character's real name / Liebe Girls Academy name:

Hime Shiraki (白木 陽芽, Shiraki Hime) / Hime Shirasagi (白鷺 陽芽, Shirasagi Hime)
Voiced by: Yui Ogura
A charming girl who dreams of marrying rich and living an easy life of wealth. To achieve this dream, she always presents an agreeable persona to endear herself to others, leaving few to know her true character.
Mitsuki Yano (矢野 美月, Yano Mitsuki) / Mitsuki Ayanokouji (綾小路 美月, Ayanokōji Mitsuki)
Voiced by: Sumire Uesaka
A beautiful and graceful girl who plays the role of a kind senpai at the salon. She very quickly comes to dislike Hime, since unbeknownst to Hime, the two are old friends who parted on bad terms.
Kanoko Mamiya (間宮 果乃子, Mamiya Kanoko) / Kanoko Amamiya (雨宮 果乃子, Amamiya Kanoko)
Voiced by: Minami Tanaka
A shy girl who has been Hime's friend since middle school and knows Hime's true personality. Kanoko comes to work at the café after following Hime there. Kanoko is secretly in love with Hime to the point of obsession.
Sumika Chibana (知花 純加, Chibana Sumika) / Sumika Tachibana (橘 純加, Tachibana Sumika)
Voiced by: Makoto Koichi
A calm and collected girl who plays a senpai in the café. However, outside of work, she is considered a gyaru. She becomes more involved with Kanoko once she begins to believe that Kanoko may harbor unrequited feelings for Hime.
Mai Koshiba (小柴 舞, Koshiba Mai) / Mai Mikoshiba (御子柴 舞, Mikoshiba Mai)
Voiced by: Yukari Tamura
The manager of the café. Mai guilts Hime into working at the café after Hime accidentally injured her arm.
Nene Nishidera (西寺 寧々, Nishidera Nene) / Nene Saionji (西園寺 寧々, Saionji Nene)
Voiced by: Asami Seto
One of the first waitresses hired at the café alongside Sumika. However, she has since moved to become part of the kitchen staff instead.
Youko Gotou (後藤 葉子, Gotō Yōko) / Youko Goeidou (五影堂 葉子, Goeidō Yōko)
Voiced by: Shizuka Itō
A former member of the café. While she worked there, she played a seductress character who got between Nene and Sumika's personal and professional lives.
Haruko Shinooka (篠岡 春子, Shinooka Haruko)
A new member of the kitchen staff who works alongside Nene. Although she does not fully understand the concept of the café, she still finds it charming.

== Production ==
=== Manga ===
==== Conception ====
According to Miman, Yuri Is My Job! started with the idea of combining a classic school setting with a concept café, a type of restaurant themed around cosplay and performance. She felt that the disparity between a character's actual and outward personality as they worked in the café would make for an interesting story, particularly in how each character shows both sides of their persona as they experience difficult times.

After serialization was decided, Miman began working on creating characters that would fit the setting and theme. She tried to keep the character designs simple, yet also capable of clearly conveying each character's dual personalities. She described Hime's style as like a "beloved princess". (Note: "愛されお姫様" (Aisare ohime-sama)) For the overall environment of Liebe Girls Academy, she aimed to create a classic and refined atmosphere.

==== Development ====
Throughout the series' development, Miman focused on how characters often hide their true selves, resulting in constant misunderstandings that progress the story. However, she realized that if the reader was unable to discern when a character was lying, the story would become difficult to follow. As such, she emphasized the unique traits of each character's contrasting personas to make it clear when a character is merely acting, such as having Hime's dialogue be exaggerated and comical when she is not being sincere. By doing so, Miman hoped to make each character's inner self stand out more clearly.

Miman had to adjust the series' pacing over time, since she initially overestimated the number of story elements she would be able to include. For example, she planned to reveal Mitsuki's backstory in the first chapter, but this was rejected by her editor due to the amount of exposition that would be necessary; Miman ended up delaying the scene until the first volume's final chapter. For subsequent volumes, she often had to overcome tight pacing to be able to fully develop the story's characters. Miman also opined that it was important for an author to be emotionally immersed in the work while creating it; she said that her favorite scene was Hime and Mitsuki's reconciliation in the 10th chapter, which she cried over while storyboarding.

==== Publication ====
Yuri Is My Job! was Miman's first serialized work. She had begun drawing yuri manga with a one-shot story that she published at Comitia in 2005; after creating additional doujinshi works, she were approached by an editor from Yuri Shoujo, which led to being commercially published for the first time. Following that, she began contributing yuri short stories to Shinshokan's Hirari magazine, and were eventually offered serialization by Comic Yuri Hime.

Miman described creating a serialized work as a difficult experience, since she had to meet monthly deadlines despite never having drawn a chapter in that timespan before. Initially, she were unable to meet the deadlines, so she had to use prepared material to make up the difference. Over time, Miman was able to better adapt to the workflow, such as by relying on her editor for support, and appreciated more the experience of creating a continuous story.

=== Anime ===
==== Adaptation ====
Hijiri Sanpei, the anime's director, felt that while the first volume of the manga series resembled a comedy, it soon transitioned into drama as the characters and their relationships were further explored. As he adapted it into an anime, he aimed to avoid over-the-top portrayals, instead focusing on each character's emotional nuances. In addition, he tried to ensure that the characters remained likable even during serious and confrontational scenes.

Sanpei consulted extensively with Miman during production. In particular, he would often ask Miman about parts of the story that were planned but had not yet been serialized, which allowed the production staff to more accurately portraying character emotions. Miman also provided reference materials for the setting that were eventually incorporated into the background scenery.

The story is set in a concept café, which many of those involved in the production were not familiar with. As such, production staff visited concept cafés throughout the recording process to better understand what they were.

==== Animation ====
Takayuki Nagatani, one of the anime's producers, noted that one important part of the animation was clearly conveying the distinction between each character's performed and real personalities, as well as comedic and serious moments. He observed that while the story emphasizes the difference between one's public and private self, every part of an animation is public-facing, which meant that the staff took great care in making it.

The animation features vibrant colors, a style which the animators finalized after significant trial and error. The tone of the voice acting was adapted to match this visual atmosphere, with Yui Ogura freely expressing Hime's emotions rather than holding them back. Ogura also noted that due to the need to synchronize her lines with the visuals, she often had to vary her tone and pacing.

==== Voice acting ====
As a voice actress herself, Ogura said that she related to Hime's ability to put on an act for others. She sought to portray Hime as cute, calling her character someone naturally likable. To avoid Hime coming across as manipulative, Ogura aimed to show Hime's cuteness regardless of which persona she was putting on. She also felt that Hime has a large gap between her outward appearance and her feelings, which she found to be charming and was careful to not portray in an unpleasant way. Because Hime's actions drive much of the story, Ogura initially felt a lot of pressure, but she settled into her role over time.

Sumire Uesaka, who played Mitsuki, described her character as the opposite of Hime; while Mitsuki seems composed and beautiful on the outside, Uesaka felt that Mitsuki struggles to put on an act and often acts awkwardly when trying to connect to others. Uesaka sought to convey this in a way that would keep Mitsuki endearing, especially since she enjoyed her character's sincerity and straightforwardness.

Minami Tanaka, who played Kanoko, felt that one of her character's most important traits is her strong romantic feelings for Hime. She paid particular attention to the contrast between Kanoko's interactions with Hime, which tend to be warm, versus her interactions with other people, which tend to involve Kanoko being extremely shy, but never deliberately cold.

Makoto Koichi, who played Sumika, aimed to balance between her character's aspects of natural beauty and deliberate charisma, which she found to be difficult but enjoyable to perform. For example, when her character is outside of the café, Koichi would try to incorporate gyaru elements into her acting. She described her character as someone who is considerate and observant, but sometimes acts slightly pushy to Kanoko.

== Media ==
=== Manga ===
Written and illustrated by Miman, Yuri Is My Job! began serialization in Ichijinsha's Comic Yuri Hime on November 18, 2016. Ichijinsha has compiled its chapters into individual tankōbon volumes. The first volume was published on June 16, 2017. As of November 18, 2026, fifteen volumes have been published. Kodansha USA licensed the manga in English as the company's first yuri release.

Ichijinsha published an anthology of the series titled Yuri is My Job! Official Comic Anthology (私の百合はお仕事です！ 公式コミックアンソロジー) on May 17, 2023.

The series went on hiatus on May 17, 2024. A month later, it was announced the hiatus was extended indefinitely due to Miman's health issues. It resumed on August 18, 2025.

=== Anime ===
An anime television series adaptation was announced on May 14, 2022. It is produced by Passione and Studio Lings, and directed by Hijiri Sanpei, with scripts written by Naoki Hayashi, character designs handled by Taisuke Iwasaki, and music composed by Megumi Ōhashi. The series aired from April 6 to June 22, 2023, on AT-X and other networks. The opening theme song is "Himitsu♡Melody" (秘密♡Melody; "Secret Melody") by Yui Ogura, while the ending theme song is "Yume ga Sametemo" (夢が覚めても; "Even If I Wake Up from This Dream") by Ogura and Sumire Uesaka. At Anime NYC 2022, Crunchyroll announced that they had licensed the series for streaming worldwide.

=== Drama ===
A short-form web drama adaptation was announced on November 13, 2026. The series will be directed by Daiki Nakayama, with Nishioka To Neil writing the scripts. It is set to premiere on the Tatedora vertical content streaming app in Q2 2027.

== Reception ==
=== Accolades and sales ===
In 2018, Yuri Is My Job! was one of twenty finalists shortlisted for Niconico and Da Vinci's Next Manga Awards. The series has also been featured on BookWalker's top-selling manga for 2019 and 2020.

By May 2023, Yuri Is My Job! had 1 million copies in circulation.

=== Critical reception ===
==== Manga ====
Rebecca Silverman from Anime News Network gave the first volume an overall B+ grade. Silverman noted that the first volume was "much more interested in the parodic aspects of the story, though, so readers should be prepared for more humor than actual yearning glances, and a certain degree of familiarity with Class S yuri is probably going to make the book more enjoyable". Anime UK News gave the first volume 8/10, praising its strong setup and additional German translation notes.

=== Anime ===
The anime was received positively. Alex Henderson of Anime Feminist reviewed the first episode, stating that there is "fun to be had" with the show's premise, with a potential for satire and meta commentary in the show's cafe, arguing those working there are "literally performing an idealized girlhood", argued it had a premiere with "potential", and said they are excited for the series going forward.
