= List of works published by Ichijinsha =

A list of works published by Ichijinsha, included titles from its predecessors, DNA Media Comics and Issaisha, lists by release date.

== 1990s ==
=== 1996 ===
- Megami Ibunroku Persona

=== 1999 ===
- Bus Gamer

== 2000s ==
=== 2000 ===
- Kanon Comic Anthology

=== 2001 ===
- Air Comic Anthology

=== 2002 ===
- Amatsuki
- Dazzle
- Foxy Lady
- Guilty Gear X2
- Loveless
- Magical × Miracle
- Makai Senki Disgaea
- Saiyuki Reload
- Strange+
- Utawarerumono Comic Anthology

=== 2003 ===
- Saiyuki Gaiden
- Snow Comic Anthology
- Tales of Symphonia Comic Anthology
- Tales of Symphonia Yonkoma Kings
- Vampire Doll: Guilt-Na-Zan
- Weiß: Side B

=== 2004 ===
- Carnival Phantasm
- Clannad Comic Anthology volume 1
- Clannad Comic Anthology volume 2
- Gau-Gau Wata 2
- Guilty Gear Isuka 4 Koma Kings
- Guilty Gear Isuka Comic Anthology
- Kotonoha no Miko to Kotodama no Majo to
- MAGiMAGi
- Xenosaga Episode I

=== 2005 ===
- 07-Ghost
- Himuro no Tenchi Fate/School Life
- Kisses, Sighs, and Cherry Blossom Pink
- North Wind Fan Book
- SoltyRei
- Tetsuichi
- To Heart 2 Comic Anthology
- Touhou Project ~ Bohemian Archive in Japanese Red

=== 2006 ===
- Clannad Comic Anthology Tokubetsu Hen
- Fate/Hollow Ataraxia Anthology Comic
- Kannagi: Crazy Shrine Maidens
- Reverend D
- Simoun
- Shirasunamura
- Touhou Project ~ Memorizable Gensokyo
- Touhou Project ~ Perfect Memento in Strict Sense

=== 2007 ===
- Di(e)ce
- Haru Natsu Aki Fuyu
- Karneval
- Little Busters! Comic Anthology
- Touhou Project ~ Inaba of the Moon and Inaba of the Earth
- Touhou Project ~ Silent Sinner in Blue
- Utawarerumono Chiri Yuku Mono e no Komoi Uta Comic Anthology

=== 2008 ===
- Aoishiro - Waltz of the Blue Castle
- Bats & Terry
- Engine Sentai Go-Onger Photobook Mahha Zenkai!
- G Senjō no Maō Comic Anthology
- Hanjuku-Joshi
- The Idolmaster Break!
- Little Busters! Ecstasy Comic
- Persona: Trinity Soul Comic Anthology
- Sakura Familia!
- School Days Kotonoha Anthology
- School Heart's Tsuki to Hanabi to Yakusoku
- Shizume no Itaka
- Touhou Project ~ Cage in Lunatic Runagate
- Umineko Biyori: Rokkenjima e Yōkoso!!
- YuruYuri

=== 2009 ===
- 07-Ghost Children
- Canaan Comic Anthology
- Devils and Realist
- Eden*
- Engaged to the Unidentified
- G Senjō no Maō Visual Fan Book
- The Idolmaster Innocent Blue for Dearly Stars
- The Idolmaster Neue Green for Dearly Stars
- The Idolmaster Splash Red for Dearly Stars
- Konohana Kitan
- Little Busters! Ecstasy Ecstatic Anthology
- Magical Somera-chan
- Miritari!
- Saiyuki Ibun
- Sora Kake Girl R
- Starry☆Sky~in Spring~ Comic Anthology
- Starry☆Sky~in Summer~ Comic Anthology
- Touhou Project ~ Grimoire of Marisa

== 2010s ==
=== 2010 ===
- 30-sai no Hoken Taiiku
- Bokura wa Minna Ikiteiru!
- Canaan Official Fanbook
- Reset!
- Shion no Ketsuzoku
- Tales of Graces Comic Anthology
- Tales of Symphonia Comic Anthology: The Best
- Tenchi Muyo! War on Geminar
- Touhou Project ~ Wild and Horned Hermit

=== 2011 ===
- Danchigai
- Himegoto
- I Can't Understand What My Husband Is Saying
- Joker no Kuni no Alice: Circus to Usotsuki Game
- Little Busters! Kudryavka Noumi
- Locodol
- Rewrite Comic Anthology
- Rewrite: Okaken e Yōkoso!!
- Seitokai Tantei Kirika
- Senran Kagura: Guren no Uroboros
- Tales of Graces f Comic Anthology
- Watashi Sekai o Kouseisuru Chiri no ...
- Gyakuten Kenji 2 Comic Anthology

=== 2012 ===
- Citrus
- Daitoshokan no Hitsujikai: Library 4
- Hitorijime My Hero
- Ixion Saga ED
- Fujiyuu Sekai
- Little Busters! Band Mission
- Long Riders!
- Masamune-kun's Revenge
- My Wife is the Student Council President
- Ohmuroke
- Persona 4: The Ultimate in Mayonaka Arena: Comic Anthology
- Shomin Sample
- Touhou Project ~ Symposium of Post-mysticism

=== 2013 ===
- Cocytus
- Daitoshokan no Hitsujikai: Comic Anthology
- Masamune-kun's Revenge Novel - Hazuki Takeoka
- Ring Ring Busters!
- Tales of Xillia 2 Comic Anthology
- Tales of Xillia Yonkoma Kings
- TV Anime Little Busters! Comic Anthology
- Yahari 4-koma demo Ore no Seishun Rabu Kome wa machigatteiru.
- Zankou Noise

=== 2014 ===
- 4-koma no Zvezda
- Bakumatsu Rock
- Battle Rabbits
- Cocytus
- The Idolmaster Million Live! Backstage
- Junketsu no White Light
- Miritari! Otsugata
- Miss Caretaker of Sunohara-sou
- NTR: Netsuzou Trap
- Ojisan and Marshmallow
- Persona Q: Shadow of the Labyrinth: Comic Anthology
- Renai Paradise New Edition
- World Conquest Zvezda Plot
- Wotakoi: Love Is Hard for Otaku

=== 2015 ===
- 2DK, G Pen, Mezamashi Tokei
- The High School Life of a Fudanshi
- Koi to Yobu ni wa Kimochi Warui
- Tachibanakan To Lie Angle
- Tales of Zestiria: The Time of Guidance

=== 2016 ===
- Éclair – Anata ni Hibiku Yuri Anthology
- Jingai-san no Yome
- Macross Δ: The Black-Winged White Knight
- Macross Δ: The Diva Who Guides the Galaxy
- Shomin Sample: I Was Spun Off by an Elite All-Girls School as a Sample Commoner
- Tatoe Todokanu Ito da to Shite mo
- Wataten!: An Angel Flew Down to Me
- Yatogame-chan Kansatsu Nikki
- Yuri Is My Job!

=== 2017 ===
- Bocchi Kaibutsu to Moumoku Shoujo
- Fate/Grand Order -mortalis:stella-
- Iyana Kao sa renagara o Pants Misete moraitai Shashin-shū
- Life Lessons with Uramichi Oniisan
- My Next Life as a Villainess: All Routes Lead to Doom!
- My Senpai Is Annoying
- Toumei na Usui Mizuiro ni
- Tsurezure Biyori

=== 2018 ===
- Azur Lane Comic à la Carte
- Azur Lane Comic Anthology
- Azur Lane Queen's Orders
- Azur Lane: Slow Ahead!
- Citrus Plus
- Comic Love Kome ~The Rice Plant or the Seed~
- Eve to Eve
- I Married My Best Friend To Shut My Parents Up
- Inugami-san to Nekoyama-san
- Masamune-kun no Revenge After School
- Musanso Renai Oya ga Urusai Node ...
- Scarlet

=== 2019 ===
- The Case Files of Jeweler Richard
- Isekai Senpai ー Tejina Senpai wa Kono Sekai de mo Ponkotsu na Yō Desu
- Otome Game no Hametsu Flag shika nai Akuyaku Reijou ni Tensei shite shimatta... Zettai Zetsumei! Hametsu Sunzen Hen
- Sono Keisatsukan, Tokidoki Yajū!
- Umineko-sou Days

== 2020s ==
=== 2021 ===
- Senpai wa Otokonoko

=== 2023 ===
- The Strange House

== Unsorted ==
- First Love Sisters
- Gestlat
- Strawberry Shake Sweet
- Voiceful
- Wild Adapter
- Yurihime Wildrose

== See also ==
- List of manga published by Kodansha
- List of works published by Kodansha
