= Yuzu (disambiguation) =

Yuzu is a citrus fruit native to East Asia.

Yuzu may also refer to:

- Yuzu (band), a J-pop band formed in 1997
- Yuzu (emulator), a discontinued open-source emulator for the Nintendo Switch console
- Yuzu Kurosaki, a character in the anime and manga series Bleach
- Yuzu Miyashiro, a character in the Da Capo series of visual novels
- Yuzu Mizutani, creator of the Japanese shōjo manga Magical × Miracle
- Yuzu Nembutsu, nembutsu in some forms of Pure Land Buddhism
- Yuzu tea, a Korean beverage
- Yuzu, common nickname for Japanese figure skater Yuzuru Hanyu
- Yuzu, an online education platform provided by Barnes & Noble Nook
- Yuzu Aihara, a fictional character from the yuri manga Citrus
- Yuzuyu "Yuzu" Sakashita, a fictional character from the manga and anime Aishiteruze Baby
