= Vampire Doll =

Vampire Doll may refer to:

- The Vampire Doll, a 1970 Japanese horror film directed by Michio Yamamoto
- Vampire Doll: Guilt-Na-Zan, a 2003–2008 manga written and illustrated by Erika Kari
