= Bokura no Kiseki =

Japanese manga series

- Cover of the first volume

ボクラノキセキ
- Genre: Adventure, fantasy
- Manga
- Written by: Natsuo Kumeta
- Published by: Ichijinsha
- Imprint: Zero Sum Comics
- Magazine: Comic Zero Sum WARD (2008–2015); Monthly Comic Zero Sum (2015–present)
- Original run: September 27, 2008 – present
- Volumes: 34

Bokura no Kiseki (ボクラノキセキ; lit. 'Our Miracle') is a Japanese manga series written and illustrated by Natsuo Kumeta. Originally a one-shot published in Ichijinsha's Comic Zero Sum WARD, it began serialization in Comic Zero Sum WARD in September 2008. In May 2015, Comic Zero Sum WARD ceased publication and the series was transferred to Monthly Comic Zero Sum. As of May 2026, 34 volumes have been published.

== Plot ==
Veronica is the princess of a country that perished in ancient times. Harusumi Minami, a boy living in the present day, has had memories of Veronica's death since childhood. Harusumi cannot believe the events in his own memory, and when he reveals that the princess is from his previous life, he is shunned by those around him and as a result spends his childhood in solitude. However, in middle school, he realized that the magic Veronica learned in their previous life can be used by him too.

Several years later, Harusumi becomes a high school student, and as he adjusts to new relationships, he makes it his daily routine to write down things in his memory in a notebook. When a classmate sees his notebook, Harusumi's fate regarding his past life begins to change.

== Characters ==
Harusumi Minami (皆見 晴澄, Minami Harusumi)
Voiced by: Jun Fukuyama (drama CD)
He is the reincarnation of Princess Veronica of Zerestria. He retained his memory as Veronica since he was very young and was ostracized in elementary and middle school for asserting his past life. The only one to believe him was his close friend, Kamioka. His notebook is part of what triggered the others to remember their past selves, along with the use of magic. He and Yuu are the only two known characters to be born of the opposite gender after being reincarnated.
Haruko Takao (高尾 春湖, Takao Haruko)
Voiced by: Aya Endō (drama CD)
She is Harusumi's girlfriend, one of the first few who came to the realization that Minami is Princess Veronica. She is the reincarnation of Rida Razarasare, Veronica's bodyguard. She often acts as his protector, even in the present time.
Yu Hiroki (広木 悠, Hiroki Yū)
A close friend of Takao and middle school friends with Ryuuji and Momoka. At first, she pretended to be Princess Veronica until Minami confessed to his true identity. Later on, she revealed to be reincarnation of Bart Belbania of Zerestria, but was actually using Bart's identify to hide her real identity as Glen. She hid her identity because she fears that those who wished to harm her in the past will come after her again. She has retained her memory of Glen since her first year of middle school. Harusumi and her are the only two known characters to be born of the opposite gender after being reincarnated.
Tatsuya Otomo (大友 辰哉, Ōtomo Tatsuya)
He is the reincarnation of Carlo Velbard, the bishop's right-hand man, a priest second-in-command of the church who knew Veronica as a child while she lived in the monastery. In the present, he is currently in charge of the priests because of the bishop's absence.
Saya Kamioka (上岡 紗耶, Kamioka Saya)
She is Harusumi's friend from middle school. She was the only person who believed him, the only one that was his friend. In high school, she was placed in a different class from Harusumi. She was attacked by someone with the ability to use magic one day after school, which caused Harusumi to strongly wish and prevent dragging in ordinary people who are not related to the past events.
Ryo Zeze (瀬々 稜, Zeze Ryō)
He is a classmate of Harusumi and a carefree student who gets along with everyone. He is a part-timer at a karaoke owned by his parents, the place which is used by the characters to host their secret meetings. He does not remember who was his past self, not wanting to remember it. It was later revealed through flashbacks and quotes that he is the reincarnation of Prince Eugene.

== Media ==
=== Manga ===
Written by Natsuo Kumeta, the series originated as a one-shot published in Comic Zero Sum WARD in 2007. The one-shot was turned into a full series, which began serialization in Comic Zero Sum WARD on September 27, 2008. (Note: The series began serialization in the November 2008 issue of Comic Zero Sum WARD, which was released on September 27.) In May 2015, Comic Zero Sum WARD ended publication and the series was transferred to Monthly Comic Zero Sum. As of May 2026, the series' individual chapters have been collected into 34 tankōbon volumes.

A volume collecting various limited edition bonus manga written by Kumeta was released by Ichijinsha on October 23, 2020.

==== Volume list ====
No.	Japanese release date	Japanese ISBN
1	February 25, 2009	978-4-75-805394-5
2	January 25, 2010	978-4-75-805477-5
3	September 25, 2010	978-4-75-805543-7
4	March 26, 2011	978-4-75-805590-1
5	September 24, 2011	978-4-75-805640-3
6	May 25, 2012	978-4-75-805703-5
7	November 24, 2012	978-4-75-805758-5
8	May 25, 2013	978-4-75-805814-8
9	November 25, 2013	978-4-75-805864-3
10	May 24, 2014	978-4-75-805911-4
11	November 25, 2014	978-4-75-805967-1
12	June 25, 2015	978-4-75-803043-4
13	November 25, 2015	978-4-75-803131-8
14	May 25, 2016	978-4-75-803189-9
15	November 25, 2016	978-4-75-803241-4
16	May 25, 2017	978-4-75-803275-9
17	November 25, 2017	978-4-75-803320-6
18	May 25, 2018	978-4-75-803354-1
19	November 24, 2018	978-4-75-803400-5
20	May 25, 2019	978-4-75-803439-5
21	November 25, 2019	978-4-75-803472-2
22	May 25, 2020	978-4-75-803511-8
23	November 25, 2020	978-4-75-803560-6
24	May 25, 2021	978-4-75-803607-8
25	November 25, 2021	978-4-75-803675-7
26	May 25, 2022	978-4-75-803740-2
27	November 25, 2022	978-4-75-803813-3
28	May 25, 2023	978-4-75-803887-4
29	November 25, 2023	978-4-75-803958-1
30	May 28, 2024	978-4-75-808516-8
31	November 28, 2024	978-4-75-808615-8
32	May 30, 2025	978-4-75-808694-3
33	November 29, 2025	978-4-75-808858-9
34	May 29, 2026	978-4-75-809911-0

=== Other ===
In 2012, the series had a collaboration with Chika Ogaki's Landreaall manga, which included a joint art exhibition in Akihabara.

The series has received several drama CD adaptations, which are often bundled with special editions of the series' volumes.

== Reception ==
Christel Scheja of Splash Comics liked how the story jumps from a school and fantasy setting, though he felt it relied too much on cliches associated with the school setting. A columnist of Tanuki.pl liked the concept of the story and the characters. They also liked the artwork, though they felt that it lacked any unique art style.
