= Di(e)ce =

Manga by Kana Yamamoto

- di(e)ce
- The cover of the first volume of the Japanese manga

di［e］ce -ダイス- (di(e)ce -daisu-)
- Genre: Action, Mystery, Supernatural, Tragedy, Sci-fi
- Manga
- Written by: Kana Yamamoto
- Published by: Ichijinsha
- Magazine: Monthly Comic Zero Sum
- Original run: 2007 – 2010
- Volumes: 6

Di(e)ce (di［e］ce-ダイス-, di[e]ce –daisu-), stylized di[e]ce, is a manga written and illustrated by Kana Yamamoto. Since 2007, it has been serialized in a shōjo manga magazine, Monthly Comic Zero Sum. The story covers two best-friends, Kazuki Naruse and Haruki Koutake, which is on the advanced track of Seitoukou Academy. Though they are not connected by blood, these two whose faces are so similar coincidentally have their 16th birthdays on 11 November. However, on that fateful anniversary, the game of fate—killing and surviving, which is called di[e]ce, started, revealing that they are the two kings that is supposed to kill each other in order to finish the game. The manga chapters ended in November 2010, and the series has 6 collected volumes published by Ichijinsha. They are also available in French.

== Plot ==
The plot begins at Seitokou Academy, which is in the fictional area of Boudo, Tokyo. There the arcade-game king, Kazuki Naruse, is best friends with the student council president, Haruki Koutake. Both have similar faces, and coincidentally have the same birthday, 11 November. On their 16th birthday, a game of survival, di(e)ce, started. In the game, Kazuki and Haruki, were revealed to be the kings of the game, and as there cannot be two kings in a game, one would have to kill the other. Meeting various other players such as Sion and Gara, the two best-friends find their way to kill each other.

== Characters ==
- Kazuki Naruse, a freshman in Seitokoh Academy who is revealed to be play the role of King within the game di(e)ce. Outside di(e)ce, he is well known as the KING of game arcades and good at P.E activities. He often shows a big loyalty to his feelings especially in friendship, and is a brave-hearted one. He is very caring, but sometimes also air-headed and rather stupid. By the end of the series it is revealed Kazuki is an imperfect copy of Saryuu made out of fragments left behind. He ultimately reaches his manifest destiny of becoming a perfect copy of Saryuu.
- Haruki Koutake, a freshman in Seitokoh Academy who is Kazuki's best friend since childhood and also the school president in Seitokoh Academy. He is also revealed to be the other king in the game di(e)ce. He is very attached to his work and his responsibility is very high. He is very wise in acting, but sometimes too naive in making decisions. He is also shown to be very caring. By the end of the series it is revealed Haruki is an exact copy of Akikage, acting as a counterpart to Kazuki.
- Yuki Shirakawa, a freshman who is Haruki and Kazuki's best friend since elementary school. He is partially involved in the game di(e)ce, as the pawn piece. He is very clumsy and is easily scared, though his life changed totally after meeting Ruka, another part of him, in a dreamlike state after Ruka's death. He has a special ability of hearing what other people can't hear, including sounds and even thoughts.
- Sion Saiguuji, an upperclassman in Seitokoh Academy, who appears in the game di(e)ce as the bishop piece, acting as Kazuki's guide. He is very silent and very obedient. His counterpart is Gara, his childhood friend. The two have the same face.
- Gara, a man who appears in the game of di(e)ce as Haruki's guide. He shares the same position as Sion, and is equal in strength to Sion. He is very wild, though he is wise in making decisions.
- Naoto Kanzaki, a freshman who takes role as an actor in Kamen Rider series. He is pretty closed in socialization, which makes him nervous in front of people. When he joins in the game di(e)ce, he realized that Kazuki was the only one he had, and he became Kazuki's knight piece, the first piece in a chess. Naoto is a very shy and inconfident person, which is something that Kazuki tried to change.
- Kirito, a boy who met Haruki in a short timed di(e)ce, and was saved by Haruki. Owing his life in Haruki, he decided to help Haruki being the first piece in chess; knight. Kirito is shown to be rather caring and brave person. He is also sacrificial.
- Ruka, a boy who is Yuki's counterpart. He has the same ability as Yuki. He had a rough life, his hardships mainly caused by his ability, so he wanted to become Yuki. When meeting Kazuki, he regretted taking Yuki's role and sacrificed himself for Kazuki, inspiring Yuki to go through a "promotion" and protect Kazuki in Ruka's place.
- Eiji, a man who appeared first meeting Sion in a hallway, and revealed himself as Kazuki's rook piece. He is a computer savvy and works to monitor everything in his team.
- Seiji, a man with a traditional Japanese bunny-mask, who shows up saving Haruki and reveals himself as Haruki's rook piece. Just like Eiji, he is also a computer savvy and is rivals with Eiji.
- Karen, a girl who is the Queen of di(e)ce. She is not sided in any King, but she helps which she thinks right. She also monitors all the players in the game.

Cruciata (Moderators of the game)

- Ageha is a young boy who is very carefree yet wild at the same time, but also appears to be rather worried person.
- Yuuto is a computer-savvy technician who appears to excel in spear combat. He is also a partner of Ageha.
- Kanade is a mysterious man who never shows his face. He knows almost everything about di(e)ce, and is the wisest of all. He has tactics to destroy things, and has a strong sense of justice.
- Musashi is a sword-master and is a cruel person than the others. He is mysterious in appearance and has a cruciata-marked eyepatch.

Makers

- Akikage, a man who is the original copy of Haruki Koutake. Despite being the system administrator of Boudo, he is also a simulated program within it. He has an obsession in the game of di[e]ce and is in charge of administering to it. He has a twin brother named Saryuu, with whom Akikage's obsession with di[e]ce is connected.
- Saryuu, like Akikage, is a system administrator of Boudo, he is also a simulated program within it. He is a man who looks like an older Kazuki Naruse. He has a role just exactly like Kazuki's, and he loves his brother just like Kazuki loves Haruki. However, he has died in the past in relation to di[e]ce, leaving fragments of himself behind and only Akikage to look over Boudo.

== Media ==
=== Manga ===
- First volume was released on 25 September 2007.
- Second volume was released on 24 May 2008.
- Third volume was released on 25 March 2009.
- Fourth Volume was released on 10 September 2009.
- Fifth Volume was released on 24 April 2010.
- Last (sixth) volume was released on 25 November 2010.

The manga has been published in French by Soleil Manga, in Italian by RW Edizioni, and in German by Egmont Manga.

=== Drama CD ===
On 25 December 2008, a di[e]ce's drama CD was released. It consists of eight tracks of seven stories and one after record comments.

=== Voice cast ===
- Kazuki Naruse: Miyu Irino
- Haruki Koutake: Shinnosuke Tachibana
- Sion Saiguuji: Hirofumi Nojima
- Gara: Tomokazu Sugita
- Others: Kanako Mitsuhashi/ Hiroshi Shimozaki/ Wataru Hatano/ Toshiyuki Toyonaga/ Kanae Oki

=== Crew ===
- Producers: Mitsuteru Shibata (Frontier Works), Yuuko Ima (Frontier Works), Youko Shiraishi (Frontier Works)
- Script: Makoto Inoue, Saki Otoh (Chapter 0.5)
- Music: Michihiro Iwano
- Director: Kisuke Koizumi

== Reception ==
Di[e]ce has been reviewed by the staff of Manga Sanctuary.
