= Yakuza Fiancé =

Japanese manga series

- Yakuza Fiancé: Raise wa Tanin ga Ii
- First tankōbon volume cover, featuring Kirishima Miyama (front) and Yoshino Somei (back)

来世は他人がいい (Raise wa Tanin ga Ii)
- Genre: Crime; Romantic drama
- Manga
- Written by: Asuka Konishi
- Published by: Kodansha
- English publisher: NA: Seven Seas Entertainment
- Imprint: Afternoon KC
- Magazine: Monthly Afternoon
- Original run: August 25, 2017 – present
- Volumes: 8
- Anime television series
- Directed by: Toshifumi Kawase
- Written by: Rika Takasugi
- Music by: Hiroaki Tsutsumi; Masato Suzuki
- Studio: Studio Deen
- Licensed by: Crunchyroll (streaming); SEA: Plus Media Networks Asia
- Original network: Tokyo MX, BS11, AT-X
- English network: SEA: Aniplus Asia
- Original run: October 7, 2024 – December 23, 2024
- Episodes: 12
- icon

Yakuza Fiancé: Raise wa Tanin ga Ii (Japanese: 来世は他人がいい, Hepburn: Raise wa Tanin ga Ii; lit. 'Next Life, I Would Rather Be Someone Else') is a Japanese manga series written and illustrated by Asuka Konishi. It has been serialized in Kodansha's seinen manga magazine Monthly Afternoon since August 2017. A 12-episode anime television series adaptation, produced by Studio Deen, aired from October to December 2024.

== Plot ==
Yoshino Somei is a high school girl who was born and raised in a yakuza family. Although her family environment is unique, she has spent her days quietly and peacefully. This all changes when she finds out that her grandfather has arranged for her to be married to the heir of another yakuza family, Kirishima Miyama, whom she hates with a passion.

== Characters ==
Yoshino Somei (染井 吉乃, Somei Yoshino)
Voiced by: Hitomi Ueda (Japanese); Molly Searcy (English)
Kirishima Miyama (深山 霧島, Miyama Kirishima)
Voiced by: Akira Ishida (Japanese); Bryson Baugus (English)
Shoma Toriashi (鳥葦 翔真, Toriashi Shōma)
Voiced by: Kōji Yusa (Japanese); Aaron Campbell (English)
Azami Suo (周防 薊, Suō Azami)
Voiced by: Hiroshi Kamiya (Japanese); Alejandro Saab (English)
Renji Somei (染井 蓮二, Somei Renji)
Voiced by: Yōji Ueda (Japanese); Larry Brantley (English)
Gaku Miyama (深山 萼, Miyama Gaku)
Voiced by: Kazuya Nakai (Japanese); Phil Parsons (English)
Aoi Tachibana (橘 葵, Tachibana Aoi)
Voiced by: Ryōta Takeuchi (Japanese); Xan Cramer (English)
Sota Inamori (稲森 颯太, Inamori Sōta)
Voiced by: Hiroshi Shimozaki (Japanese); Kevin D. Thelwell (English)
Taketo Hotei (布袋 竹人, Hotei Taketo)
Voiced by: Katsuyuki Konishi (Japanese); Robert McCollum (English)
Tsubaki Akashigata (明石潟 椿, Akashigata Tsubaki)
Voiced by: Reina Ueda (Japanese); Anastasia Muñoz (English)
Ryuichi Minami (南 隆一, Minami Ryūichi)
Voiced by: Setsuji Satō (Japanese); Orion Pitts (English)

== Media ==
=== Manga ===
Written and illustrated by Asuka Konishi, Yakuza Fiancé: Raise wa Tanin ga Ii began serialization in Kodansha's seinen manga magazine Monthly Afternoon on August 25, 2017. Its latest chapter was released on February 24, 2024, and in March of that same year, Konishi announced that the manga would enter an indefinite hiatus due to "various circumstances". Kodansha has collected its chapters into individual tankōbon volumes. The first volume was released on November 22, 2017. As of October 23, 2023, eight volumes have been released.

In February 2022, Seven Seas Entertainment announced that they had licensed the manga for English release in North America, with the first volume to be released that November. The first volume was released digitally on November 22, 2022, and in print on December 6. In October 2023, Kodansha added the series in English on its K Manga digital service.

==== Volumes ====
No.	Original release date	Original ISBN	English release date	English ISBN
1	November 22, 2017	978-4-06-510376-0	November 22, 2022 (digital); December 6, 2022 (print)	978-1-68579-979-3 (digital); 978-1-68579-337-1 (print)
1. "No Place for a Sore Loser (Part 1)" (負け犬に出る幕はない〈前編〉, Makeinu ni Deru Maku wa Nai (Zenpen)); 2. "No Place for a Sore Loser (Part 2)" (負け犬に出る幕はない〈後編〉, Makenin ni Deru Maku wa Nai (Kōhen)); 3. "Let Me Express My Sincerity and Maybe Earn Your Affection in the Process 1" (誠意を見せたい。あわよくば少し好きになってほしい 1, Seii o Misetai. Awayokuba Sukoshi Suki ni Natte Hoshii 1)
2	July 23, 2018	978-4-06-511660-9; 978-4-06-512979-1 (SE)	January 31, 2023	979-8-88843-225-9 (digital); 978-1-68579-343-2 (print)
4. "Let Me Express My Sincerity and Maybe Earn Your Affection in the Process 2" (誠意を見せたい。あわよくば少し好きになってほしい 2, Seii o Misetai. Awayokuba Sukoshi Suki ni Natte Hoshii 2); 5. "Let Me Express My Sincerity and Maybe Earn Your Affection in the Process 3" (誠意を見せたい。あわよくば少し好きになってほしい 3, Seii o Misetai. Awayokuba Sukoshi Suki ni Natte Hoshii 3); 6. "Becoming Human: Year One" (人間一年生, Ningen Ichinensei); 7. "Stay the Fist and Threaten with a Smile" (拳で殴らず笑顔で脅す, Ken De Nagarazu Egao De Odosu); 8. "The Three-Way from Hell (Part 1)" (地獄の三角関係〈前編〉, Jigoku no Sankaku Kankei (Zenpen)); 9. "The Three-Way from Hell (Part 2)" (地獄の三角関係〈後編〉, Jigoku no Sankaku Kankei (Kōhen))
3	May 23, 2019	978-4-06-514835-8	May 23, 2023	979-8-88843-696-7 (digital); 978-1-68579-545-0 (print)
10. "The Wicked Woman, or the Lady That Brings Ruin" (悪女、もしくは破滅を呼ぶ女, Akujo, Moshikuha Hametsu o Yobu On'na); 11. "Either a Genius or a Fool" (頭がいいのか馬鹿なのか, Atama ga Ī no ka Bakana no ka); 12. "La Dame aux Camélias" (椿姫, Tsubaki); 13. "I Would Rather You Hate Me Than Be Disinterested 1" (無関心ならいっそ嫌われたほうがいい 1, Mu Kanshinnara Isso Kirawareta Hō ga Ī 1)
4	June 23, 2020	978-4-06-519771-4	August 1, 2023	979-8-88843-928-9 (digital); 978-1-68579-914-4 (print)
14. "I Would Rather You Hate Me Than Be Disinterested 2" (無関心ならいっそ嫌われたほうがいい 2, Mu Kanshinnara Isso Kirawareta Hō ga Ī 2); 15. "I Would Rather You Hate Me Than Be Disinterested 3" (無関心ならいっそ嫌われたほうがいい 3, Mu Kanshinnara Isso Kirawareta Hō ga Ī 3); 16. "I Would Rather You Hate Me Than Be Disinterested 4" (無関心ならいっそ嫌われたほうがいい 4, Mu Kanshinnara Isso Kirawareta Hō ga Ī 4); 17. "To Tell You the Truth, I Want to Get Married" (本音を言えば結婚したい, Hon'ne o Ieba Kekkon Shitai)
5	May 21, 2021	978-4-06-523330-6	October 24, 2023	979-8-89160-161-1 (digital); 978-1-68579-936-6 (print)
18. "To Tell You the Truth, I Want to Get Married 2" (本音を言えば結婚したい 2, Hon'ne o Ieba Kekkon Shitai 2); 19. "To Tell You the Truth, I Want to Get Married 3" (本音を言えば結婚したい 3, Hon'ne o Ieba Kekkon Shitai 3); 20. "To Tell You the Truth, I Want to Get Married 4" (本音を言えば結婚したい 4, Hon'ne o Ieba Kekkon Shitai 4); 21. "To Tell You the Truth, I Want to Get Married 5" (本音を言えば結婚したい 5, Hon'ne o Ieba Kekkon Shitai 5); 22. "Pets That Outgrow Their Owner 1" (成長したら飼えない獣 1, Seichō Shitara Kaenai Kemono 1); 23. "Pets That Outgrow Their Owner 2" (成長したら飼えない獣 2, Seichō Shitara Kaenai Kemono 2)
6	March 23, 2022	978-4-06-526863-6	January 16, 2024	979-8-89160-466-7 (digital); 978-1-68579-960-1 (print)
24. "A Ball of a Brawl" (楽しい殴り合い, Tanoshī Naguriai); 25. "With the Darkening of Her Demeanor Comes Nightfall and Rain" (彼女が翳ると闇夜が降りて雨がふる, Kanojo ga Kageruto Yamiyo ga Orite Ame ga Furu); 26. "Dwellers of the Dumps" (泥の底の住人たち, Doro no Soko no Jūnintachi); 27. "You Have Been Selected for a Random Audit of Your Love" (抜き打ちで貴方の愛情試します, Nukiuchi de Anata no Aijō Tameshimasu)
7	January 23, 2023	978-4-06-529919-7	April 2, 2024	979-8-89160-831-3 (digital); 979-8-88843-404-8 (print)
28. "Tiger Meat" (虎の肉, Tora no Niku); 29. "His Kindness is Heavier Than Life 1" (彼の親切は命より重い 1, Kare no Shinsetsu wa Inochi Yori Omoi 1); 30. "His Kindness is Heavier Than Life 2" (彼の親切は命より重い 2, Kare no Shinsetsu wa Inochi Yori Omoi 2); 31. "His Kindness is Heavier Than Life 3" (彼の親切は命より重い 3, Kare no Shinsetsu wa Inochi Yori Omoi 3)
8	October 23, 2023	978-4-06-533312-9	September 3, 2024	979-8-89373-896-4 (digital); 979-8-89160-492-6 (print)
32. "Your Lover, Your Weapon, Your Scapegoat 1" (君の恋人、君の武器、君の身代わり 1, Kimi no Koibito, Kimi no Buki, Kimi no Migawari 1); 33. "Your Lover, Your Weapon, Your Scapegoat 2" (君の恋人、君の武器、君の身代わり 2, Kimi no Koibito, Kimi no Buki, Kimi no Migawari 2); 34. "Your Lover, Your Weapon, Your Scapegoat 3" (君の恋人、君の武器、君の身代わり 3, Kimi no Koibito, Kimi no Buki, Kimi no Migawari 3); 35. "You are Life 1" (君は人生 1, Kimi wa Jinsei 1); 36. "You are Life 2" (君は人生 2, Kimi wa Jinsei 2)

==== Chapters not yet in tankōbon format ====
- 37. "You are Life 3" (君は人生 3, Kimi wa Jinsei 3)
- 38. "18 Years Old" (18歳, 18-Sai)
- "Side Story" (番外編, Bangai-hen)

=== Anime ===
In October 2023, it was announced that the manga would receive an anime television series adaptation. The series is produced by Studio Deen and directed by Toshifumi Kawase, with Rika Takasugi handling series composition, Itsuko Takeda designing the characters, and Hiroaki Tsutsumi and Masato Suzuki composing the music. It aired from October 7 to December 23, 2024, on Tokyo MX and BS11; a special "Kansai Prologue-hen" episode was streamed on Amazon Prime Video in Japan for a limited time on September 28 and 29. The opening theme song is "Under and Over", performed by The Oral Cigarettes, while the ending theme song is, "Nani Wararotonnen" (なに笑ろとんねん), performed by Yoshino.

Crunchyroll is streaming the series worldwide outside of Asia. Plus Media Networks Asia has licensed the series in Southeast Asia and will broadcast it on Aniplus Asia.

==== Episodes ====
No.	Title (Note: All English titles are taken from Crunchyroll.)	Directed by (Note: Production information is taken from the ending credits of each episode.)	Written by	Storyboarded by	Original release date
1	"Ain't no place for losers here" Transliteration: "Makeinu ni Derumaku wa Nai" (Japanese: 負け犬に出る幕はない)	Kōsuke Shimatori	Rika Nakase	Toshifumi Kawase	October 7, 2024
When yakuza granddaughter Yoshino Somei is forcibly engaged to rival heir Kirishima Miyama, she reluctantly moves into his Tokyo household. At his high school, jealous female students bully her while Kirishima maintains a deceptive gentlemanly facade—until Yoshino witnesses his violent yakuza nature firsthand. He drops the act, confessing his disappointment in her "normalcy" and sadistically offering to employ her as a prostitute. After schoolmates destroy her belongings, Yoshino executes Renji's revenge scheme: vanishing for two weeks before dramatically returning to fling ¥4 million at Kirishima—earnings from her "sold" kidney. This defiant act unexpectedly awakens Kirishima's masochistic obsession, as he now begs the horrified Yoshino to marry and torment him.
2	"Let Me Express My Sincerity, and Maybe Earn Your Affection in the Process"; Transliteration: "Seii o Misetai. Awayokuba Sukoshi Suki ni Natte Hoshī" (Japanese: 誠意を見せたい。あわよくば少し好きになってほしい)	Shunji Yoshida	Rika Nakase	Toshifumi Kawase	October 14, 2024
Yoshino discovers Shiori, daughter of Miyama associate President Akaza, is implicated in a ¥500 million fraud against the Filipino mafia after an Akaza employee is murdered and Akaza vanishes. Kirishima shares how his great-uncle Gaku, Miyama boss, recruited him following a childhood incident where he severely injured 20 classmates. During a hairdryer shopping trip, Inamori elaborates on Kirishima's violent past and Gaku's intervention. Yoshino unexpectedly encounters Shiori at a club, learning the fraud triggered the employee's death and Shiori's targeting. Kirishima insists Shiori take responsibility to avert gang warfare, but Filipino enforcers attack, wounding Yoshino. Enraged, Kirishima brutally counters while Yoshino assists by knocking out an assailant with her hairdryer—an action that arouses Kirishima. The resolution sees Akaza and Shiori banished from Japan, with peace restored between factions. Kirishima later offers Yoshino ¥10 million from the recovery reward, which she declines, accepting only a new hairdryer. Their departure is interrupted when Kirishima spots a mysterious observer outside their school.
3	"The Triangle From Hell"; Transliteration: "Jigoku no Sankaku Kankei" (Japanese: 地獄の三角関係)	Matsuo Asami	Rika Nakase	Toshifumi Kawase	October 21, 2024
Kirishima proudly describes Yoshino's constant fury to a lover, who shocks him by calling it relationship dysfunction. When Yoshino later catches him watching her sleep, his claim of admiring her peacefulness is countered by her explanation: his criminal actions fuel her rage. Troubled by her indifference to his infidelity, Kirishima vows to become worthy of her love—if only to make his future betrayals hurt her. At a yakuza summit, alliances are revealed: Yoshino's grandfather Renji works with Kirishima's great-uncle Gaku and Ryuzetsu leader Akime, while the mysterious stalker is identified as Shoma, Yoshino's lifelong clansman. As Kirishima probes Shoma's motives, Yoshino confesses her heartbreak scheme—unaware this could trigger a nationwide gang war between the Tokusa and Kiriyama clans should their engagement fail. Shoma offers to kill Kirishima instead, but Yoshino's refusal sends him outside—right into Kirishima's ambush.
4	"Is He Smart or Stupid?"; Transliteration: "Atama ga Ī no ka Bakana no ka" (Japanese: 頭がいいのか馬鹿なのか)	Tetsuji Nakamura	Rika Minase	Ryōji Fujiwara	October 28, 2024
Shoma is startled when Kirishima admits he views their engagement as Renji's political ploy rather than a genuine union. Yoshino intervenes, earning Shoma's warning about toying with Kirishima. Noticing Kirishima's resurging violence, Yoshino fears losing his interest and probes whether he envies Shoma. Kirishima explains her affection for Shoma would excite his masochism—though he would ultimately kill Shoma. Yoshino reveals her original one-year exit plan but offers new terms: if he makes her love him, she will stay, provided he abandons all pretenses. When Yoshino falls ill, Kirishima's delayed return from yakuza affairs forces a hospital visit, where she faintly notices his pleasant scent. Reporting to Renji, Kirishima is surprised by his grandfather's approval of their progress.
5	"Princess Tsubaki"; Transliteration: "Tsubaki Hime" (Japanese: 椿姫)	Yū Yabuuchi	Rika Minase	Iku Suzuki	November 4, 2024
Yoshino visits her cousin Tsubaki with Kirishima, concerned Tsubaki fits Kirishima's preferred type of woman. Like Kirishima, Tsubaki maintains multiple lovers and casually offers to include him, irritating Yoshino. Tsubaki idolizes their grandfather Renji as her ideal man and deduces Kirishima uniquely craves Yoshino's attention. When school paperwork requires Yoshino's immediate return, Kirishima stays behind and confronts Tsubaki about her connections to the Doseikai Medical Group's illegal organ trade, correctly guessing she faked Yoshino's kidney "sale" by only drawing blood. Tsubaki admits the deception but warns she could hide Yoshino permanently if needed. Later, Yoshino discovers Kirishima traded a teenage photo of Renji for a bikini photo of herself, sparking her anger.
6	"I'd Rather You Hate Me than Not Care, Part One"; Transliteration: "Mu Kanshinnara Isso Kirawareta Hō ga Ī: Zenpen" (Japanese: 無関心ならいっそ嫌われたほうがいい 前編)	Tsuyoshi Yoshimoto	Rika Nakase	Ryoji Fujiwara	November 11, 2024
Yoshino voices her frustration to Tsubaki that Kirishima's obsession does not equate to love. Tsubaki encourages her to verify his true feelings. Meanwhile, former child actress Nao Shiota returns to Japan determined to revive her career at any cost. Though warned about Kirishima's rumored manipulation of past actresses, Nao secretly shares history with him. During their Osaka summer trip, Yoshino grows suspicious when Kirishima opts for a hotel over her family home. Shoma advises Yoshino to assert more control over Kirishima's actions. Unbeknownst to her, Kirishima reunites with Nao at the hotel where they sleep together. Nao probes about his Osaka plans but is dismayed to find Yoshino's photo on his phone, realizing his lingering attachment.
7	"I'd Rather You Hate Me than Not Care, Part Two"; Transliteration: "Mu Kanshinnara Isso Kirawareta Hō ga Ī: Kōhen" (Japanese: 無関心ならいっそ嫌われたほうがいい 後編)	Shunji Yoshida	Rika Nakase	Toshifumi Kawase	November 18, 2024
During their Osaka trip, Yoshino visits a women's college and surprises Kirishima with a handmade keychain. Nao privately tells Yoshino about her childhood connection to Kirishima, piquing her interest. Meanwhile, Ozu blackmails Nao with knowledge of her sexual history, forcing her to set up Kirishima and Yoshino. When Kirishima meets Nao at a hotel, he reveals he manipulated her into exposing Ozu's crimes—including coercing actresses into porn before having them killed. Nao confesses she directed Yoshino into a trap, but Kirishima discovers Yoshino instead followed Ozu, having suspected the setup.
8	"To Be Honest, I Want to Marry You, Part One"; Transliteration: "Hon'ne o Ieba Kekkon Shitai: Zenpen" (Japanese: 本音を言えば結婚したい 前編)	Kōsuke Shimatori	Rika Nakase	Megumi Yamamoto	November 25, 2024
Yoshino discovers Ozu was hired by the Filipino mafia to assassinate Kirishima in retaliation for his earlier violence. When she urgently summons Kirishima after spotting Ozu's red-haired associate, he instead sends Shoma to retrieve her from a karaoke bar—a decision that backfires when Shoma finds Nao there instead and gets intercepted by the red-haired thug. Meanwhile, Yoshino cleverly delays Ozu by posing as an acquaintance until he abandons her upon realizing the operation is collapsing. Furious at Kirishima's interference, Yoshino delivers an ultimatum: return to Tokyo permanently or eliminate Ozu, even at the cost of his life. Intrigued by her newfound ferocity, Kirishima proposes a wager—if he captures Ozu by midnight, she must marry him at 18. Unmoved, Yoshino counters with her own terms: he must both apprehend Ozu and defeat her in combat before midnight to earn a relationship lasting only until college graduation. This tense negotiation reveals both characters' evolving dynamics—Yoshino asserting control through calculated challenges while Kirishima remains drawn to her unpredictable strength.
9	"To Be Honest, I Want to Marry You, Part Two"; Transliteration: "Hon'ne o Ieba Kekkon Shitai: Chūhen" (Japanese: 本音を言えば結婚したい 中編)	Takashi Andō	Megumu Sasano	Hiroyuki Fukushima	December 2, 2024
All parties converge in a park where Yoshino trails Ozu and Filipino leader Naoya, learning about Azami—a dangerous yakuza who previously disposed of Ozu's accusers and now wants Kirishima eliminated. After Naoya assaults Ozu for his incompetence, he discovers and chases Yoshino. Meanwhile, Kirishima systematically defeats the Filipino thugs after engineering a blackout. During the darkness, Azami reveals his true target is Yoshino, identifying himself as Azami Suo before escaping to avoid police attention. Yoshino ultimately subdues Naoya with a stun gun, while Shoma's confrontation with the red-haired thug ends with a warning about Yoshino and Kirishima potentially sparking a yakuza war. The captured Ozu awakens to find himself at the mercy of Yoshino and Kirishima, completing their successful counteroperation.
10	"To Be Honest, I Want to Marry You, Part Three"; Transliteration: "Hon'ne o Ieba Kekkon Shitai: Kōhen" (Japanese: 本音を言えば結婚したい 後編)	Honami Inamura	Rika Nagase	Ryoji Fujiwara	December 9, 2024
Unable to prove Ozu's crimes, Kirishima blackmails him with evidence of his mother's infidelity, forcing Ozu to abandon Nao—who arrives with Shoma bearing recorded confirmation. Shoma notes the red-haired man isn't yakuza. After Kirishima severs ties with Nao, she bluntly states Yoshino dislikes him. Alone with Yoshino, Kirishima learns she secretly tracked him for days via a GPS hidden in her handmade keychain. Kirishima admits he knowingly kept the tracked keychain, which Yoshino interprets as proof of genuine attachment—had he been indifferent, he would have discarded it. Amused by her reasoning, Kirishima claims victory in their bet after capturing Ozu, but Yoshino reminds him the terms required defeating her too. He promptly beats her at rock-paper-scissors, securing their forced relationship. Meanwhile, a new threat emerges as another dangerous figure takes interest in their Osaka presence.
11	"A Pet that Becomes Unruly as It Grows"; Transliteration: "Seichō Shitara Kaenai Kemono" (Japanese: 成長したら飼えない獣)	Tsuyoshi Yoshimoto	Megumu Sasano	Toshifumi Kawase	December 16, 2024
Renji confronts Kirishima for endangering Yoshino during the Ozu incident and violently reprimands him. Though Kirishima argues it was personal business, Renji issues a stern warning to prioritize Yoshino's safety. Tsubaki expresses surprise at their relationship, cautioning Yoshino about Kirishima's romantic experience versus her naivety. Meanwhile, Kirishima provokes Shoma by claiming his loyalty to Yoshino is yakuza-conditioned, resulting in a brutal fight broken up by Yoshino. Disappointed, she reveals she dated Kirishima hoping to end his rivalry with Shoma. Kirishima later leaves with Tsubaki, who recognizes he instigated the fight to hide Renji's beating and protect Yoshino from family conflict. Tsubaki advises him to pursue a normal high school romance. Struggling with dating unconventional Kirishima, Yoshino humorously considers Shoma instead—who declines due to her no-smoking rule.
12	"When She's Upset the Rain Falls and the Dark Night Descends"; Transliteration: "Kanojo ga Kageru to Yamiyo ga Orite ame ga Furu" (Japanese: 彼女が翳ると闇夜が降りて雨がふる)	Hitomi Ezoe	Rika Nanase	Toshifumi Kawase	December 23, 2024
Kirishima grows increasingly distressed as Yoshino ignores him for three days following his fight with Shoma. After desperate pleading outside her room, she finally breaks her silence, warning him against further conflicts—if Shoma instigates a fight, Kirishima must walk away, or face harsher silence. Kirishima admits reluctant respect for Shoma's yakuza potential, a trait he lacks. When Yoshino questions his dating intentions, his flirtatiousness flusters her into headbutting him. Meanwhile, Osaka's underworld destabilizes after a boss's arrest, prompting Renji and other leaders to face criticism while rival Azuma schemes against him. Elsewhere, Red Perm meets with Azami, hinting at looming threats. Kirishima's obsession resurfaces when he sneaks beside a sleeping Yoshino, captivated—an act that causes them to miss Shoma's urgent call.

== Reception ==
Yakuza Fiancé: Raise wa Tanin ga Ii won the fourth Next Manga Award in the print category in 2018. Along with The Way of the Househusband, it ranked eighth on Takarajimasha's Kono Manga ga Sugoi! 2019 ranking of Top 20 manga series for male readers. The series ranked eleventh on "Nationwide Bookstore Employees' Recommended Comics of 2018" by the Honya Club website. The series ranked 48th on the 2020 "Book of the Year" list by Da Vinci magazine. The manga was nominated for the 46th Kodansha Manga Award in the general category in 2022.

== See also ==
- Haru's Curse, another manga series by Asuka Konishi
