= Hi no Matoi =

Japanese manga series

- First tankōbon volume cover

緋の纏
- Genre: Historical
- Manga
- Written by: Miku Inui
- Published by: Ichijinsha
- Imprint: Zero Sum Comics
- Magazine: Comic Zero Sum WARD
- Original run: July 16, 2008 – September 16, 2014 (on hiatus)
- Volumes: 10

Hi no Matoi (Japanese: 緋の纏; "Akenomatoi") is a Japanese manga series written and illustrated by Miku Inui. It began serialization in Ichijinsha's shōjo manga magazine Comic Zero Sum WARD since July 2008, with its chapters collected in ten tankōbon volumes as of August 2014. The series has been on an extended hiatus since September 2014, due to the author's health.

== Publication ==
Written and illustrated by Miku Inui, Hi no Matoi began serialization in Ichijinsha's shōjo manga magazine Comic Zero Sum WARD on July 16, 2008. (Note: The series began serialization in the September 2008 issue of Comic Zero Sum WARD (cover date September 1), which was released on July 16.) The series has been on an extended hiatus since September 16, 2014, due to the author's health. (Note: The series went on hiatus in the magazine's November issue of 2014 (cover date November 1), which was released on September 16.) Ichijinsha has collected its chapters into individual tankōbon volumes. The first volume was released on April 25, 2009. As of August 25, 2014, ten volumes have been released. A limited edition for the tenth volume that include a drama CD was released on May 21, 2014.

=== Volumes ===
| No. | Release date | ISBN |
|---|---|---|
| 1 | April 25, 2009 | 978-4-75-805410-2 |
| 2 | February 25, 2010 | 978-4-75-805487-4 |
| 3 | November 25, 2010 | 978-4-75-805554-3 |
| 4 | May 25, 2011 | 978-4-75-805607-6 |
| 5 | November 25, 2011 | 978-4-75-805667-0 |
| 6 | June 25, 2012 | 978-4-75-805720-2 |
| 7 | December 25, 2012 | 978-4-75-805767-7; 978-4-75-805768-4 (LE) |
| 8 | July 25, 2013 | 978-4-75-805824-7; 978-4-75-805825-4 (LE) |
| 9 | February 25, 2014 | 978-4-75-805879-7; 978-4-75-805880-3 (LE) |
| 10 | August 25, 2014 | 978-4-75-805936-7; 978-4-75-805937-4 (LE) |
