= Haru's Curse =

Japanese manga series

- First tankōbon volume cover

春の呪い (Haru no Noroi)
- Genre: Romance
- Manga
- Written by: Asuka Konishi
- Published by: Ichijinsha
- English publisher: NA: Kodansha USA
- Imprint: Zero Sum Comics
- Magazine: Monthly Comic Zero Sum
- Original run: November 28, 2015 – November 28, 2016
- Volumes: 2
- Television drama
- Directed by: Masayuki Ochiai
- Written by: Masayuki Ochiai
- Original network: TV Tokyo
- Original run: May 22, 2021 – June 26, 2021
- Episodes: 6
- icon

Haru's Curse (Japanese: 春の呪い, Hepburn: Haru no Noroi) is a Japanese manga series written and illustrated by Asuka Konishi. It was serialized in Ichijinsha's josei manga magazine Monthly Comic Zero Sum from November 2015 to November 2016. A six-episode live-action television drama adaptation aired from May to June 2021.

== Synopsis ==
After the death of her younger sister Haru, Natsumi begins dating her arranged fiancé Togo, and asks him to take her to the places he and Haru had visited while together. After dating Togo, Natsumi starts to feel guilt over Haru's death.

== Characters ==
Natsumi Tachibana (立花夏美, Tachibana Natsumi)
Portrayed by: Hikaru Takahashi
Togo Hiiragi (柊冬吾, Hiiragi Tōgo)
Portrayed by: Asuka Kudo
Haru Tachibana (立花春, Tachibana Haru)
Portrayed by: Hiyori Sakurada
Seimi Hiiragi (柊聖美, Hiiragi Seimi)
Portrayed by: Reiko Takashima

== Media ==
=== Manga ===
Written and illustrated by Asuka Konishi, Haru's Curse was serialized in Ichijinsha's josei manga magazine Monthly Comic Zero Sum from November 28, 2015, to November 28, 2016. Its chapters were compiled into two tankōbon volumes, released from April 25 to December 24, 2016. The series is licensed in English by Kodansha USA.

No.	Original release date	Original ISBN	North American release date	North American ISBN
1	April 25, 2016	978-4-7580-3181-3	February 16, 2021	978-1-9499-8026-4
1. "Spring is gone." 2. "July" (7月, Shichigatsu); 3. "August" (8月, Hachigatsu); 4. "September (Part One)" (9月 (前編), Kugatsu (Zenpen))
2	December 24, 2016	978-4-7580-3248-3	February 16, 2021	978-1-9499-8026-4
5. "September (Part Two)" (9月 (後編), Kugatsu (Kōhen)); 6. "November (Part One)" (11月 (前編), Jūichigatsu (Zenpen)); 7. "November (Part Two)" (11月 (後編), Jūichigatsu (Kōhen)); 8. "and winter will come."; Bonus Comic 1–2

=== Drama ===
A live-action television drama was announced in April 2021. The drama was written and directed by Masayuki Ochiai and starred Hikaru Takahashi in the lead role as Natsumi Tachibana. It aired on TV Tokyo's "Satadora" programming block from May 22 to June 26, 2021.

== Reception ==
The series was ranked second in the 2017 edition of Takarajimasha's Kono Manga ga Sugoi! guidebook list of the best manga for female readers.

== See also ==
- Yakuza Fiancé, another manga series by Asuka Konishi
