= Monthly Comic Zero Sum =

Japanese manga magazine

- Cover of the first issue of Monthly Comic Zero Sum
- Editor-in-Chief: Ayako Kimishima
- Categories: Josei manga
- Frequency: Monthly
- Publisher: Ichijinsha
- First issue: May 2002
- Country: Japan
- Language: Japanese
- Website: www.ichijinsha.co.jp/zerosum/

Comic Zero Sum WARD
- Categories: Josei manga
- Frequency: Bimonthly (2008–2015); Quarterly (2003–2007)
- Publisher: Ichijinsha
- First issue: February 2003
- Final issue: May 2015
- Country: Japan
- Language: Japanese

Monthly Comic Zero Sum (Japanese: 月刊コミックZERO-SUM, Hepburn: Gekkan Komikku Zero Samu) is a josei manga magazine published by Ichijinsha and launched since March 28, 2002 (the May 2002 issue). This first issue of the magazine featured cover art by Kazuya Minekura, lead color pages by Yun Kōga, and included the works of writers Sho Sawada, Kaisei Endo, Miyuki Yama, Nobuyuki Ueda, Shoko Tsutsumi, Verno Mikawa, and Erika Kari. Its volumes usually contain over 600 pages and tackles a variety of genres, with well-known manga like Saiyuki Reload, Amatsuki, 07-Ghost, My Next Life as a Villainess, Bibliophile Princess, and Loveless.

A shōjo manga edition called Comic Zero Sum Ward (コミックZERO-SUM 増刊WARD, Komikku Zero Samu Zōkan Wādo) was published starting in August 2003. It ceased publication in May 2015.

In July 2005, the yuri magazine Comic Yuri Hime (コミック百合姫, Komikku Yuri Hime; lit. "Lily Princess Comics" or "Lesbian Princess Comics") was launched as another quarterly supplement to the magazine. It was financially dependent upon Monthly Comic Zero Sum until 2008 when it became independent from the magazine.

== Serialized manga ==
=== Monthly Comic Zero Sum ===
==== Current ====
- Bibliophile Princess by Yui Kikuta, and Yui (2018–present)
- Fate/Grand Order -mortalis:stella- by Shiramine (2017–present)
- Higeki no Genkyō to naru Saikyō Gedō Last Boss Joō wa Min no tame ni Tsukushimasu. The Savior's Pride by Akiko Kawano, Tenichi, and Suzunosuke (2025–present) (Note: Continuation of Higeki no Genkyō to naru Saikyō Gedō Last Boss Joō wa Min no tame ni Tsukushimasu. To The Savior by Akiko Kawano, Tenichi, and Suzunosuke)
- Housekeeping Mage From Another World: Making Your Adventures Feel Like Home! by Akihito Ono and You Huguruma (2019–present)
- Kare ni Irai Shite wa Ikemasen by Utako Yukihiro (Note: Same illustrator as Devils and Realist) (2018–present)
- Kashoku no Shiro by Shinobu Takayama (Note: same creator as Amatsuki) (2019–present)
- Kuri Hime Ayakashi Yobanashi by Hyūganatsu and Anko Chōchin (2024–present)
- Landreaall by Ogaki Chika (2002–present)
- Loveless by Yun Kōga (2002–hiatus)
- Luce to Shiro no Keiyaku by Touya Mikanagi (Note: Same creator as Karneval) (2022–present)
- My Next Life as a Villainess: All Routes Lead to Doom! by Satoru Yamaguchi and Nami Hidaka (2017–present)
- Niemiko by Alaskapan (2024–present)
- Phantom of the Idol (2017–present)
- Promise of Wizard by Tsushimi Bunta and Shinonome Uta (2020–present)
- Saiyuki Reload Blast by Kazuya Minekura (2009–2017, 2024–present)
- The Case Files of Jeweler Richard by Nanako Tsujimura and Mika Akatsuki (2019–present)
- Though I Am an Inept Villainess by Satsuki Nakamura and Ei Ohitsuji (2020–present)

==== 2000s ====
- Dawn: Tsumetai Te by Ueda Shinshu (2002–2007)
- Weiß Side B by Shoko Ohmine and Takehito Koyasu (2002–2006) (later transferred to Zero Sum WARD [2006–2007])
- Strange+ by Verno Mikawa (2002–2018)
- Saiyuki Reload by Kazuya Minekura (2002–2009)
- Ogamiya Yokochō Tenmatsuki by Fukusuke Miyamoto (2002–2017)
- Magical × Miracle by Yuzu Mizutani (2002–2006)
- Dazzle by Minari Endoh (2002–2019) (Note: Originally published in Monthly G-Fantasy (1999–2002) and later transferred to Zero Sum Online (2019–2022))
- Amatsuki by Shinobu Takayama (2002–2017)
- Vampire Doll: Guilt-Na-Zan by Erika Kari (2003–2008)
- Saiyuki Gaiden by Kazuya Minekura (2003–2006) (Note: Originally published in Monthly G-Fantasy (1999–2003) and later transferred to Zero Sum WARD (2006–2009))
- Xenosaga Episode I: Der Wille zur Macht by Baba Atsushi (2004–2006)
- Tetsuichi by Yuri Narushima (2004–2012)
- Dolls by Naked Ape (Note: Same creative duo behind Switch) (2005–2012)
- 07-Ghost by Yuki Amemiya and Yukino Ichihara (2005–2013)
- Absorb;Ability by Yoneyama Setsuko (Note: Same illustrator as Record of Lodoss War: Deedlit's Tale) (2006–2007)
- Shōnen Hakaryūdo by Kikuta Yui (2007–2009)
- Olympos by aki (Note: Same illustrator as Sugar Apple Fairy Tale novels and The White Cat's Revenge as Plotted from the Dragon King's Lap manga) (2007–2009)
- Karneval by Tōya Mikanagi (2007–2021)
- Di (e)ce by Kana Yamamoto and Otoh Saki (Note: Same writer from creative duo Naked Ape who are the creators of Switch) (2007–2010)
- #000000 ~ultra black~ by Kisaragi Yoshinori (Note: Same illustrator as the Your Forma manga) (2007–2011)
- +C Sword and Cornett by Yugyoji Tama (2008–2012)
- Are you Alice? by Ai Ninomiya and Ikumi Katagiri (2009–2015)
- Makai Ōji: Devils and Realist by Madoka Takadono and Utako Yukihiro (2009–2018)
- Tenkyuugi – Sephirahnatus by Aya Takamiya and Tatsune Seno (2009–2015)
- Tousei Gensou Hakubutsushi by Katayama Shuu (Note: Same creator as Dragon Fist) (2009–2011)

==== 2010s ====
- Haikyō Circle by Azusa Yuki and Yuna Watanabe (2010–2012)
- Alice in the Country of Joker: Circus and Liar's Game by Mamenosuke Fujimaru (2011–2014)
- Kisshou 7 -seven- by Ai Tenkawa and Otoh Saki (2011–2013)
- Clay Lord: Master of Golems by Jun Suzumoto (2013–2014)
- Battle Rabbits by Yuki Amemiya and Yukino Ichihara (2014–2016)
- Bakumatsu Rock -howling soul- by Shinshu Ueda (2014–2015)
- Halcyon by Naked Ape (2014–2016)
- The Seven Princes of the Thousand-Year Labyrinth by Yu Aikawa and Haruno Atori (2014–2016)
- Hatsune Miku: Bad∞End∞Night by Hitoshizuku-P X Yama and Tsubata Nozaki (2014–2016)
- Love & Hate by Yoshiki Usa (Note: Same creator as Wooser's Hand-to-Mouth Life) and Yuu Kurono (2015–2016)
- Red Riding Hood & the Big Sad Wolf by Shin Hachijō (2015–2016)
- Shunkan Lyle by Arina Tanemura and Yui Kikuta (2015–2018)
- Tales of Zestiria: Michibiki no Koku by Shiramine (2015–2016)
- Haru's Curse by Asuka Konishi (2015–2016)
- Hitokiri Share House by Ai Ninomiya and Ikumi Katagiri (2016–2017)
- Macross Delta: Kuroki Tsubasa no Shirokishi by Azuki Fuji (2016–2017)
- Tsukiuta. THE ANIMATION by Mero (2016–2017)
- Fire Emblem if – Crown of Nibelungen by Yugyoji Tama (2017–2018)
- Mikansei Saikorotonics by Shinobu Takayama (2017–2019)
- A3! Spring by Yoshimi Muneyama (2017–2018)
- A3! Summer by Yoshimi Muneyama (2018–2019)
- Hypnosis Mic: Division Rap Battle -side F.P. & M by Kiiko Jyо̄ and Yūichirō Momose (2018–2020)
- Akenomori by Joga (2018–2019)
- The Tales of Marielle Clarac by Haruka Momo and Alaskapan (2018–2024)
- TSUKIPRO THE ANIMATION by Kotoari Asatani (2018–2019)
- A3! Autumn by Yoshimi Muneyama (2019–2020)
- Kishi Danchō Kōsaku Shima by Fukusuke Miyamoto, Kenshi Hirokane, and Makoto Beppu (2019–2021)
- Tensei! Dazai Osamu by Kyōsuke Suga and Yūya Satō (2019–2021)

==== 2020s ====
- Tsukiuta. THE ANIMATION 2 by Aiko Kotori (2020–2022)
- MAGATSU WAHRHEIT: Hitotsukiri no Madōsho by Tama Yūgyōji (2020)
- Hypnosis Mic: Division Rap Battle -side F.P. & M+ by Kiiko Jyо̄ and Yūichirō Momose (2020–2023) (sequel to -side F.P. & M)
- Get Up! Get Live! by Ugonba (2020–2021)
- Butai ni Sake! by Shō Harusono (Note: Same creator as Sasaki and Miyano) (2020–2023)
- A3! Winter by Yoshimi Muneyama (2020–2021)
- Long Goodbye My Honey by Yuki Amemiya and Yukino Ichihara (2021–2023)
- Kin-iro no Corda: Starlight Orchestra Comic by Hachi Yatsuhashi (2021–2024)
- DEEMO: Prelude by Haruki Niwa (2021–2022)
- Yami Maid ga Shihai Suru! by Akiwo Yasaka and Yu Aikawa (2022–2024)
- Nanji Nanpun Chikyū ga Nankai Mawattara by Tōko Machida and Kotoba Hoshino (2022–2023)
- Ayaka: Muzzle Flash Back by GoRA and Ryo Kuroda (2023)
- Higeki no Genkyō to naru Saikyō Gedō Last Boss Joō wa Min no tame ni Tsukushimasu. To The Savior by Akiko Kawano, Tenichi, and Suzunosuke (2023–2024) (Note: This adaptation is the first part of a re-adaptation of the novel due to the cancellation of the previous manga adaptation by Bunko Matsuura)
- My Husband is a Doomsday Weapon by Yuki Amemiya and Yukino Ichihara (Note: Same creative duo behind 07-Ghost.) (2024–2026)

=== Comic Zero Sum WARD ===
- A Presto – See You Soon by Shiina Takasato and Naruse Tomine (2010–2013)
- Aruosumente by Aki (later then moved to Zero Sum Online)
- BALLAD by Yuri Narushima (2013–2015)
- Bokura no Kiseki by Natsuo Kumeta (later moved to Monthly Comic Zero Sum)
- Chōritsu Houmuru Zyklus;Code by Ai Ninomiya and Ikumi Katagiri
- Dracul by Hakase Mizuki (2013–2015)
- Eureka Syndrome by Kuya Matsunaga
- Haigakura by Shinobu Takayama (2008–2015) (later then moved to Zero Sum Online 2015-present)
- Hari wa Akebono Ito wo Kashi by Umeta Yamashiro
- Hi no Matoi by Miku Inui
- Mein Ritter ~Watashi no Kishi~ by Shu Katayama
- Remlerose no Majo by Chizu Kamikō, Haruka Shimotsuki, and Nao Hiyama (2013–2014)
- Saihate no Ao by Saya Fuyume
- Saiyuki Gaiden by Kazuya Minekura (2006–2009)
- Saiyuki Ibun by Kazuya Minekura (2009–hiatus)
- Sato-kun to Tanaka-san-The blood highschool by Yun Kōga (later then moved to Zero Sum Online)
- Uwasaya by Sakamichi Hosaka and Natsume Hasumi (later then moved to Zero Sum Online)
- Wild Adapter by Kazuya Minekura (later then moved to Zero Sum Online)

=== Zero Sum Online ===
- Dorm Life by Umeta Yamashiro
- The High School Life of a Fudanshi
- Jingai-san no Yome by Akiwo Yasaka and Yu Aikawa
- ROOT∞REXX Honey Melody by Touya Mikanagi and Otomate
- The Most Heretical Last Boss Queen: From Villainess to Savior by Bunko Matsuura, Tenichi, and Suzunosuke (2020–2022)
- Accomplishment of Fudanshi Bartender
- We Swore to Meet in the Next Life and That's When Things Got Weird!
