= Bibliophile Princess =

Japanese light novel series

- First light novel volume cover, featuring Elianna Bernstein (left) and Christopher Selkirk Ashelard (right)

虫かぶり姫 (Mushikaburi-hime)
- Genre: Drama, romance
- Novel series
- Written by: Yui
- Published by: Shōsetsuka ni Narō
- Original run: September 13, 2015 – January 23, 2022
- Light novel
- Written by: Yui
- Illustrated by: Satsuki Shiina
- Published by: Ichijinsha
- English publisher: NA: J-Novel Club
- Imprint: Iris NEO
- Original run: July 1, 2016 – present
- Volumes: 7
- Manga
- Written by: Yui
- Illustrated by: Yui Kikuta
- Published by: Ichijinsha
- English publisher: NA: J-Novel Club
- Magazine: Monthly Comic Zero Sum
- Original run: August 28, 2018 – present
- Volumes: 11
- Anime television series
- Directed by: Tarō Iwasaki
- Written by: Mitsutaka Hirota
- Music by: Yūko Fukushima; Tomotaka Ōsumi
- Studio: Madhouse
- Licensed by: Sentai Filmworks
- Original network: AT-X, Tokyo MX, Kansai TV, BS NTV
- Original run: October 6, 2022 – December 22, 2022
- Episodes: 12

Bibliophile Princess (Japanese: 虫かぶり姫, Hepburn: Mushikaburi-hime) is a Japanese light novel series written by Yui and illustrated by Satsuki Shiina. It was serialized online from September 2015 to January 2022 on the user-generated novel publishing website Shōsetsuka ni Narō. It was later acquired by Ichijinsha, who has released seven volumes since July 2016 under their Iris NEO label.

A manga adaptation with art by Yui Kikuta has been serialized via Ichijinsha's josei manga magazine Monthly Comic Zero Sum since August 2018. It has been collected in eleven tankōbon volumes. The light novels and manga are both licensed in North America by J-Novel Club. An anime television series adaptation by Madhouse aired from October to December 2022.

== Plot ==
Princess Elianna, known as the "Bibliophile Princess", agrees to a fake engagement with the Crown Prince Christopher, which shields the Prince from court politics and allows Elianna to read in peace. She spends most of her time reading the books in the royal archive, yet when rumors arise that Christopher is consorting with another nobleswoman, Elianna decides that it's time to face her feelings and accept her high-society duties.

== Characters ==
Lady Elianna Bernstein (エリアーナ・ベルンシュタイン, Eriāna Berunshutain)
Voiced by: Reina Ueda
Known as the "Bibliophile Princess," she belongs to the high nobility with her family being Marquess, (HIDIVE has currently been translating her family as having a lower rank due to the family living under a false name in order to not stand out) her family's alias is the "brains of Sauslind". Her family is known for being bibliophiles. She becomes the fiancée of the heir to the throne, but only because of the added perk of gaining access to their library. Members of the Bernstein family have long been considered national treasures due to their ability to read and recall vast amounts of information for the benefit of the kingdom, but at the same time the Bernstein's have always insisted on remaining politically neutral, so when young Christopher revealed his wish to marry her, Elianna's grandfather rejected Christopher's proposal and young Elianna was confined to the Bernstein estate.
Eliana spent her engagement period under the belief it was solely to deflect Christopher's other suitors; not knowing the truth, until one said girl failed to paint Eliana as villainess.
His Highness Christopher Selkirk Ashelard (クリストファー・セルカーク・アッシェラルド, Kurisutofā Serukāku Assherarudo)
Voiced by: Ryōhei Kimura
Heir to the throne of the Sauslind Kingdom. Christopher keeps Elianna out of the politics, allowing her access to the royal library and using whatever interesting facts she gleams from the books to help the kingdom; because of such, Eliana remained oblivious to his true feelings for years.
Lord Alexei Strasser (アレクセイ・シュトラッサー, Arekusei Shutorassā)
Voiced by: Koki Uchiyama
Seems to be an administrative counselor of the heir. He always use Elianna like his errand girl, particularly whenever Christopher annoys him. He's called the Ice Lord by Lord Theodore, and the Ice Demon by Lord Glen.
Lord Glen Eisenach (グレン・アイゼナッハ, Guren Aizenahha)
Voiced by: Yuma Uchida
A high ranking knight who seems close to Christopher.
Prince Theodore Warren Ashelard (テオドール・ウォーレン・アッシェラルド, Teodōru Wōren Assherarudo)
Voiced by: Wataru Hatano
The King's younger brother and Christopher's uncle. Curator of the Royal Archives.
Alan Ferrera (アラン・フェレーラ, Aran Ferēra)
Voiced by: Gen Satō
Irvine Olanza (アーヴィン・オランザ, Āvuin Oranza)
Voiced by: Yōhei Azakami
Alfred Bernstein (アルフレッド・ベルンシュタイン, Arufureddo Berunshutain)
Voiced by: Nobunaga Shimazaki
Elianna's older brother.
Jean (ジャン, Jan)
Voiced by: Taku Yashiro

== Media ==
=== Light novel ===
Written by Yui and illustrated by Satsuki Shiina, the series was originally serialized online on the Shōsetsuka ni Narō website from September 13, 2015, to January 23, 2022. Ichijinsha acquired the series, and published the first volume in print under their Iris NEO label on July 1, 2016. As of October 2022, seven volumes have been released. The series is licensed in North America by J-Novel Club.

No.	Title	Original release date	English release date
1	Bibliophile Princess 虫かぶり姫	July 1, 2016; 978-4-75-804848-4	March 17, 2020; 978-1-71-830854-1
2	The Flower Protector 花守り虫と祈りを捧げる使者	February 2, 2017; 978-4-75-804912-2	May 23, 2020; 978-1-71-830856-5
3	The Butterflies' Dance 蝶々たちの踊る聖夜の祝宴	August 2, 2017; 978-4-75-804975-7	July 28, 2020; 978-1-71-830858-9
4	Awaiting and Wishing 春を待つ虫、琥珀の願	August 2, 2018; 978-4-75-809086-5	October 13, 2020; 978-1-71-830860-2
5	Dreaming of Winter's End 冬下虫の見る夢、決別の目覚め	July 2, 2019; 978-4-75-809185-5	January 12, 2021; 978-1-71-830862-6
6	The Guiding Light of Hope 冬下虫の蠢動、光の道標	February 2, 2022; 978-4-75-809435-1	March 30, 2023; 978-1-71-830864-0
7	The Blue Sky Compass and the Spring Bird 青天の羅針盤と春告げ鳥	October 4, 2022; 978-4-75-809496-2	January 18, 2024; 978-1-71-830866-4

=== Manga ===
A manga adaptation with art by Yui Kikuta began serialization in Ichijinsha's Monthly Comic Zero Sum magazine on August 28, 2018. The first tankōbon volume was released on April 25, 2019. As of March 2026, eleven volumes have been released. J-Novel Club is also publishing the manga in North America.

No.	Original release date	Original ISBN	English release date	English ISBN
1	April 25, 2019	978-4-7580-3432-6	December 2, 2020	978-1-7183-4480-8
2	October 25, 2019	978-4-7580-3466-1	May 5, 2021	978-1-7183-4481-5
3	April 25, 2020	978-4-7580-3504-0	August 16, 2021	978-1-7183-4482-2
4	November 30, 2020	978-4-7580-3564-4	February 2, 2022	978-1-7183-4483-9
5	May 31, 2021	978-4-7580-3611-5	March 2, 2022	978-1-7183-4484-6
6	February 28, 2022	978-4-7580-3718-1; 978-4-7580-3719-8 (SE)	August 17, 2022	978-1-7183-4485-3
7	October 31, 2022	978-4-7580-3806-5	February 28, 2024	978-1-7183-4486-0
8	May 31, 2023	978-4-7580-3892-8	February 19, 2025	978-1-7183-4487-7
9	May 28, 2024	978-4-7580-8520-5	June 11, 2025	978-1-7183-4488-4
10	April 30, 2025	978-4-7580-8684-4	February 11, 2026	978-1-7183-4489-1
11	March 31, 2026	978-4-7580-9813-7	—	—

=== Anime ===
An anime television series adaptation produced by Madhouse was announced on January 28, 2022. The series is directed by Tarō Iwasaki, with scripts written by Mitsutaka Hirota, character designs by Mizuka Takahashi, and music composed by Yūko Fukushima and Tomotaka Ōsumi. It aired from October 6 to December 22, 2022, on AT-X, Tokyo MX, Kansai TV, and BS NTV. The opening theme song is "Prologue" by Yuka Iguchi, while the ending theme song is "Kawabyōshi" (革表紙; "Leather Binding") by Kashitarō Itō. Sentai Filmworks licensed the series and is streaming it on Hidive.

No.	Title (Note: All English titles are taken from Hidive.)	Directed by (Note: Information is taken from the ending credits of each episode.)	Written by	Storyboarded by	Original release date
1	"Phony Fiancé"; Transliteration: "Misekake no Konyakusha" (Japanese: 見せかけの婚約者)	Tarō Iwasaki	Mitsutaka Hirota	Tarō Iwasaki	October 6, 2022
Elianna Bernstein is a young lady from a minor noble family famous for their love of books. One day Prince Christopher proposes she become his fiancée. Due to kingdom politics he desires a wife whose family is politically neutral, plus she will be free to read as much as she likes. Elianna agrees and is given access to the royal archives where she meets Alexei who works with Christopher, Glen who is assigned as her guard, and Christopher's uncle Theodore. Four years later Elianna has read almost the entire archives but begins to worry as there is gossip their engagement is fake. A maid warns Elianna a new noble, Lady Irene, is attending the castle and is not trustworthy. Elianna meets Irene, who seems a very happy, outgoing woman. Several strange incidents occur which makes Elianna uneasy, especially as Christopher doesn't visit recently. Then Elianna is abruptly banned from the archives by Theodore and Glen assigns her a new guard. Christopher returns, explaining he was absent searching for a very rare book she once asked him about, making her very happy. A week later Elianna sees Christopher and Irene laughing together and realizes Christopher might be preparing to end their fake engagement and find a proper wife. Despite expecting this would happen eventually Elianna begins to cry.
2	"One-Woman Show"; Transliteration: "Hitorishibai" (Japanese: 一人芝居)	Chikayo Nakamura, Park Jaeik	Mitsutaka Hirota	Asami Kawano	October 13, 2022
Having realised she is in love with Christopher, Elianna decides to confront him, but once again finds him with Irene. Elianna returns the rare book Christopher gave her and leaves, heartbroken. Days later Elianna returns a book to Theodore and bumps into Alexei who gives her several archive related tasks. Irene abruptly fakes falling down stairs and claims Elianna pushed her as well as claiming court musician Alan Ferrera witnessed everything and will testify against Elianna. Christopher points out Elianna couldn't have pushed her due to carrying Alexei's paperwork, and has Irene and her father Duke Palcas arrested for attempting to assassinate Elianna. Alan is revealed as one of Christopher's men protecting Elianna and he confirms Irene's father plotted Elianna's death as revenge for Elianna unintentionally uncovering his criminal activities, which would also allow Irene to replace Elianna and become Queen. Irene claims a bibliophile is unworthy to be Queen, but numerous palace officials reveal since becoming Christopher's fiancé Elianna's encyclopedic familiarity with the archives has rooted out corruption, boosted the economy, inspired advances in medicine and cuisine and numerous other areas even Elianna herself was unaware of. Irene and her father are imprisoned for treason. Christopher publicly confirms Elianna is beloved by everyone in the kingdom and will one day be his Queen, putting an end to the rumours she is a fake fiancé.
3	"And So the Two..."; Transliteration: "Soshite Futari wa" (Japanese: そして二人は)	Hiromichi Matano	Mitsutaka Hirota	Kōji Sawai	October 20, 2022
Elianna is made aware her father and grandfather gave Christopher two requirements to marry her; gain the unanimous support of every Lord in the kingdom without mentioning the Bernstein family alias and become more important to Elianna than books. Christopher almost kisses Elianna, until she abruptly asks what her family's alias actually is. Christopher recalls as children he vandalized several books and, despite being royalty, young Elianna not only scolded him, but she also forced him to apologize to the books. When he informed his father, the King, he loved Elianna and wished to marry her, the entire royal family panicked. Christopher thus reveals Elianna's family alias is "brains of Sauslind". Members of the Bernstein family have long been considered national treasures due to their ability to read and recall vast amounts of information for the benefit of the kingdom, but at the same time the Bernstein's have always insisted on remaining politically neutral, so when young Christopher revealed his wish to marry her Elianna's grandfather rejected Christopher's proposal and young Elianna was confined to the Bernstein estate. By the time they met again Elianna had forgotten Christopher entirely, so he has spent the last four years earning her love and her family's approval. Elianna realises Christopher truly loves her regardless of her being a Bernstein, and they share their first kiss.
4	"The Star Traveler"; Transliteration: "Hoshi no Tabibito" (Japanese: 星の旅人)	Chikayo Nakamura	Yoshiko Nakamura	Chikayo Nakamura, Tarō Iwasaki	October 27, 2022
As a child Christopher's mother taught him magic words leading to happiness. Elianna desires to visit the Star of Sissel, travelling scholars which visit with books from foreign lands. To maintain secrecy Christopher insists she use his first name and pay a forfeit if she calls him "Highness". Elianna acquires a copy of The Star Traveller, children's fairy tales her mother loved. Two children, Rene and Paolo, are caught stealing a book and claim they were forced by a Bernstein noble. Rene mistakes Christopher for his father as his father had blue eyes. Rene explains his mother, a former Sissel dancer, is ill and needs to see the Sissel's physician, Chief Letzi, so a noble claiming to be a Bernstein offered to get them to Letzi in exchange for stealing the book. Paolo, a scholar child helping Rene, does not trust nobles. Elianna shares one of the Star Traveller stories about treating others with compassion, so Paolo apologizes. Paolo knows Christopher can't be Rene's father but asks him to pretend to make Rene happy. Christopher tells Rene a story from his childhood teaching him it is OK not to know where his father is. Christopher arranges a meeting with Letzi, revealing he acquired something from Letzi six years ago. From their conversation Elianna fears Christopher might actually be Rene's father.
5	"The Treasure of Hers and the Prince"; Transliteration: "Ōji to Kanojo no Takaramono" (Japanese: 王子と彼女の宝物)	Akira Mano, Park Jaeik	Yoshiko Nakamura	Kōji Sawai	November 3, 2022
It is revealed six years ago Letzi gave Christopher advice on becoming a man Elianna's father would approve of. Elianna, made uneasy by her ignorance of Christophers past, leaves to escort Rene back to his mother. Alan advises her to ask Christopher directly. Rene's friends inform Elianna the fake Bernstein has kidnapped Rene's mother and plans to burn all the books he forced them to steal to hide his crimes. Alan leaves to fetch Christopher but Elianna rushes alone to save the books and sees the fake Bernstein is Baron Maudsley of Christophers royal court. He attempts to blackmail Elianna with the damage he can do to her family reputation unless she influences Christopher to take money meant for medical research and pay it to Maudsley's Company for weapons research. Elianna refuses to cause such financial damage to the kingdom, even when threatened. Christopher arrives, exposes Maudsley and arrests him. Rene is reunited with his mother and admits Christopher is not his father. Christopher sends Rene's mother for free treatment at a hospital Elianna inspired him to open with stories of her deceased mother. Elianna admits while Christopher has cherished memories of their first meeting as children, she did not remember him at all. Christopher shares his mother's magic words for happiness he also taught to Elianna as children, "You are my treasure." The words cause Elianna to begin remembering and they share another kiss.
6	"Hunting Festival and Lonely Official Business"; Transliteration: "Shuryōsai to Kodoku na Kōmu" (Japanese: 狩猟祭と孤独な公務)	Tomio Yamauchi	Mitsutaka Hirota	Minoru Yamaoka	November 10, 2022
Christopher leaves to visit the Miseral Duchy for two weeks. During his absence Elianna oversees the Hunt Festival. She learns from her sister Lilia the most distinguished huntsman may present a wreath to any unmarried lady as a love token. She also learns several ladies who once hoped to marry Christopher are now her social rivals, in particular the Ladies Sofia, Cecily and Caroline. A young Lord Irvin attends the hunt from another country. Sofia pretends to sprain her ankle to gain Theodore's attention, yet Theodore announces if he wins, he will give the wreath to Elianna, infuriating Sofia. Theodore warns Elianna during the festival she should never go anywhere alone. The ladies attempt to insult Elianna, but Elianna is oblivious, and the ladies leave unsatisfied. Elianna forgets Theodore's warning and while alone is confronted by Lord Lowe of Edea, a military territory. Thanks to Elianna working to prevent wars before they can begin, his military budget is severely reduced and he blames Elianna, warning her naiveté on how the world really works will make her more enemies than allies. Elianna cries, worrying she cannot rule properly without Christopher. Irvin also approaches while she is alone, appearing even more sinister than Lowe.
7	"The Ghost of Eidel"; Transliteration: "Eideru no Bōrei" (Japanese: エイデルの亡霊)	Tarō Iwasaki, Chikayo Nakamura, Akira Mano	Hiroko Kanasugi	Hikaru Takeuchi, Kōji Yoshikawa	November 17, 2022
Irvin claims Elianna has failed to live up to her reputation as the supposed Brains of Sauslind. Elsewhere, a spy informs Christopher several criminals have entered Sauslind, so Christopher orders the spy to guard Elianna. Elianna hears her acquaintance Lady Anna reject the proposal of Lord Owain due to his disrespect for women. Elianna intervenes and Owain almost attacks her but she defends herself and Owain is painfully humiliated. Sophia claims to have seen Eidel's Ghost, but once again fails to get Theodores attention. Irvine is impressed with how Elianna handled Owain. Theodore informs Elianna the supposed ghost was Lady Slade who died when her family rebelled against the royal family and were executed for treason. As she is feeling overwhelmed Alan reminds Elianna Christopher trusts her to be herself at all times. Christopher captures the criminals but is distracted worrying about Elianna. Desperate for Theodore's attention Sophia hatches a plot with her maid Rona. During the hunt Caroline is thrown by her ill-tempered horse and during the confusion Elianna is attacked by an injured wild boar but is saved by Irvine. Sophia attempts to start gossip about Elianna and Irvine but Caroline praises Elianna for helping with her horse despite having treated Elianna cruelly in the past. Irvine later overhears Sophia and Rona disappointed their plot with the injured boar failed but certain their next plan will succeed.
8	"The Flower Guarding Bug and the Praying Messenger"; Transliteration: "Hanamori Mushi to Inori o Sasageru Shisha" (Japanese: 花守り虫と祈りを捧げる使者)	Akira Mano, Park Jaeik	Yoshiko Nakamura	Akira Mano, Park Jaeik	November 24, 2022
Sophia lures Elianna to the old castle as a prank. Irvine rescues her and reveals his father was king of Maldura but his mother was from Sauslind, Lady Sylvia, daughter of the treasonous Lady Slade. Historically Maldura and Sauslind are enemies so Irvine was surprised Elianna arranged their latest peace agreement. They are suddenly attacked by criminals who intend to murder Elianna and Irvine to incite war. Irvine deduces the criminals work for his younger brother, Maldura's third prince. They are abruptly rescued by Christopher and his soldiers. Alan confirms Rona was working with the criminals, using her position as Sophia's maid to arrange Elianna's murder. Despite her ignorance of this Sophia's reputation is ruined. Irvine confirms his mother always desired peace between Maldura and Sauslind so Elianna informs Count Hayden she will likewise continue to prevent wars. Hayden is convinced she is worth supporting and swears loyalty to her. Irvine promises to convince his brother, the second prince and future king, to announce friendship between Maldura and Sauslind. The next day Hayden wins the Hunt Festival and dedicates his wreath to the memory of Lady Sylvia. Anna confirms Elianna has inspired her to remain unmarried and become a historian. Elianna invites Irvine to visit Sauslind again one day. Irvine wonders about maybe stealing Elianna away from Christopher, but claims he was only joking.
9	"A Letter From the Pearl Princess"; Transliteration: "Shinju Hime kara no Tegami" (Japanese: 真珠姫からの手紙)	Chikayo Nakamura, Kim Min-seon, Gang Tae-sik	Hiroko Kanasugi	Kōji Sawai	December 1, 2022
The Holy Night Banquet approaches and Glen is concerned that one of the noble families from the Miseral Duchy is sending their 10 year old daughter Sharon as their representative. Elianna struggles with all the decisions she is pressured to make, including selecting dresses and jewellery for official functions. Christophers mother, Queen Henrietta, worries Christopher has not fully prepared Elianna for the pressure she will face as his Queen. She also fears Elianna lacks the determination to become Queen and it is suggested many noble ladies are scheming to become Christopher's royal concubine, which would grant them political power and give any potential children a chance to inherit the throne. Elianna and Christophet meet Sharon whose older sister, Pearl Princess Mireille, was a childhood friend to Christopher and once his potential fiancé. Elianna also meets Lady Dauner and her daughter Matilda who has somehow stolen a dress design Elianna created and has a scheming nature. Henrietta provides Elianna time to think, hoping she takes the chance to respond like a Queen. Elianna deduces a disloyal maid leaked her dress design and is so overwhelmed she goes outside to calm down. Unfortunately she witnesses a messenger pass Christopher a letter personally written by Mireille.
10	"Intentions of the Butterflies"; Transliteration: "Chōchō-tachi no Omowaku" (Japanese: 蝶々たちの思惑)	Hiromichi Matano	Yoshiko Nakamura	Minoru Yamaoka	December 8, 2022
Elianna continues to fret about Mireille, Matilda and other potential concubines. She confides her worries to Alan that her carelessness could have political consequences. She attempts to see Christopher but becomes upset again at seeing Mireille's letter. A servant informs Elianna Matilda is being pressured to become Christopher's concubine by her mother, who once failed to become concubine to Christopher's father. She also advises Elianna to seriously investigate the maid who leaked her dress design, as her next betrayal will likely be worse. Elianna finally sees Christopher but his busy schedule takes him away before they can discuss anything. Sharon visits Elianna with her guard Elen and rudely requests she be Christopher's partner at the Holy Night Banquet instead of Elianna, as it would publicly strengthen Mireille's chances to become Christopher's concubine. She also points out Mireille would be ideal to manage Christophers court while the useless Elianna read books and kept out of the way. Elianna truly worries she is a nuisance to Christopher but is scared to ask him. She later sees Alfred ask Anna to the Banquet as he is in love with her. Now completely despondent Elianna asks Christopher to postpone their wedding. Elen sees her crying and blames Christopher. Elianna decides to temporarily return to her parents home and is saddened when Christopher agrees and then simply walks away from her.
11	"A Nuisance"; Transliteration: "Ojamamushi" (Japanese: お邪魔虫)	Akira Mano, Park Jaeik	Mitsutaka Hirota	Kōji Sawai	December 15, 2022
After spending the night at home Elianna returns to the palace and overhears Matilda and Elianna's maid Sara searching Elianna's room for another dress design to steal. Matilda reveals Sara is her unwilling accomplice due to owing Matilda's family money. Rather than confront Matilda Elianna instead offers her latest creation, ink made from rare clams, but Matilda rejects this as the clams come from the Corba region. Elianna confirms Matilda is prejudiced against Corba and the people who live there, like Sara. Many are prejudiced against Corba due to the belief they caused a plague 15 years ago, but Elianna reveals the archives show it was actually the government mishandling the situation that made the plague worse. Matilda tries to hit Elianna but Sara stops her and the ink ruins Matilda's stolen dress. Christopher appears and Matilda claims Elianna attacked her, but having heard everything Christopher has Matilda arrested and confirms he will never accept a concubine as he loves Elianna. Elianna apologizes to Christopher and finally tells him her fears of being an unworthy fiancé, and they reconcile. They hide when Henrietta appears and happily overhear her describe Christopher as a lovestruck nitwit and Elianna as a fine woman. Christopher explains to Elianna Henrietta loves her very much and trying to help Elianna fit into the royal court was her awkward way of showing it. Elianna decides never to run or hide her feelings from Christopher again.
12	"The Holy Night's Banquet Where the Butterflies Dance"; Transliteration: "Chōchō-tachi no Odoru Seiya no Shukuen" (Japanese: 蝶々たちの踊る聖夜の祝宴)	Tarō Iwasaki	Mitsutaka Hirota	Kōji Sawai, Tarō Iwasaki	December 22, 2022
Sharon once again asks to be Christophers dance partner, this time bribing Elianna with a unique book. Elianna is tempted but still refuses. Sharon loses her temper, believing Elianna is preventing Christopher being with Mireille. Christopher reveals Sharon has misunderstood his relationship with Mireille; what she thought were love letters were actually secret messages for Christopher to investigate the murder of Mireille's husband by several Miseral nobles. Mireille is actually happy Christopher is marrying Elianna. Sharon apologises and Christopher forgives her due to her youth. The banquet arrives with Elianna in a red dress Henrietta dyed with the clam ink, spiting the dress stealing Matilda and Lady Dauner. Henrietta has also demoted Sara as punishment and will have to earn her way back to being Elianna's maid. Christopher's father insists on rewarding Elianna's recent political and economic work, so she requests a holiday from the royal court to read all the books she has been too busy to read. After dancing with Christopher he reveals a gift for her. One of the inks she created actually glows in the dark and he has had the palace garden filled with beautiful light filled decorations just for her. He also reveals his plan to use the ink to replace expensive candles during the dark winters. Elianna is touched and they share a kiss, promising to become even closer in the coming year.
