= Akenomori =

Japanese manga series

- First tankōbon volume cover

あけのもり
- Genre: Fantasy
- Manga
- Written by: Joga
- Published by: Ichijinsha
- Imprint: Zero Sum Comics
- Magazine: Monthly Comic Zero Sum
- Original run: May 28, 2018 – March 28, 2019
- Volumes: 2

Akenomori (Japanese: あけのもり) is a Japanese manga series written and illustrated by Joga. It was serialized in Ichijinsha's josei manga magazine Monthly Comic Zero Sum from September 2018 to March 2019, with its chapters have been collected in two tankōbon and Kindle volumes as of April 2019.

== Premise ==
When the human boy Tojuro was just a child, he was running away from a stranger in a forbidden forest when he encountered a mysterious race with red eyes and wings and was saved by one of them. Seven years later, Tojuro, seeking to meet that "winged beauty" again, repeatedly enters the forbidden forest in search of him until he unexpectedly encounters the young man, an encounter that completely changes Tojuro's fate.

== Publication ==
Written and illustrated by Joga, Akenomori was serialized in Ichijinsha's josei manga magazine Monthly Comic Zero Sum. Its first installment was published in the magazine's July 2018 issue on May 28, 2018. The series finished its final installment in the May 2019 issue of Monthly Comic Zero Sum, published on March 28, 2019. Ichijinsha collected its chapters in two different edition, the first on a tankōbon volume released on October 25, 2018, and the second on a Kindle edition volume released on April 25, 2019.

=== Volumes ===
No.	Release date	ISBN
1	October 25, 2018	978-4-7580-3396-1
2	April 25, 2019 (Kindle edition)	—
