= The Seven Princes of the Thousand-Year Labyrinth =

Japanese manga series

- First tankōbon volume cover

千年迷宮の七王子 (Sennen Meikyū no Nana Ōji)
- Genre: Fantasy; Mystery
- Manga
- Written by: Yu Aikawa
- Illustrated by: Haruno Atori
- Published by: Ichijinsha
- English publisher: NA: Seven Seas Entertainment
- Imprint: Zero Sum Comics
- Magazine: Monthly Comic Zero Sum
- Original run: August 28, 2014 – May 28, 2016
- Volumes: 4
- Manga

Sennen Meikyū no Nana Ōji -Eikyū Kairō no Kishi-
- Written by: Yu Aikawa
- Illustrated by: Haruno Atori
- Published by: Ichijinsha
- Imprint: Zero Sum Comics
- Magazine: Monthly Comic Zero Sum
- Original run: November 28, 2016 – April 28, 2017
- Volumes: 1

The Seven Princes of the Thousand-Year Labyrinth (Japanese: 千年迷宮の七王子, Hepburn: Sennen Meikyū no Nana Ōji) is a Japanese manga series written by Yu Aikawa and illustrated by Haruno Atori. It was serialized in Ichijinsha's Josei manga magazine Monthly Comic Zero Sum from August 2014 to May 2016, with its chapters collected in four tankōbon volumes.

The series was licensed for English release in North America by Seven Seas Entertainment.

== Publication ==
Written by Yu Aikawa and illustrated by Haruno Atori, The Seven Princes of the Thousand-Year Labyrinth was serialized in Ichijinsha's Josei manga magazine Monthly Comic Zero Sum. Its first installment was published in the magazine's October 2014 issue on August 28, 2014. (Note: It started in the magazine's October issue of 2014 (cover date October 1), which was released on August 28.) The series finished its final installment in the July 2016 issue of Monthly Comic Zero Sum, published on May 28, 2016. (Note: It ended in the magazine's July issue of 2016 (cover date July 1), which was released on May 28.) Ichijinsha collected its chapters in four tankōbon volumes, released from January 24, 2015, to June 25, 2016.

The series was licensed for English release in North America by Seven Seas Entertainment. The four volumes were published from December 27, 2016, to November 28, 2017. In January 2019, Seven Seas Entertainment released the manga in digital. The manga has also been licensed in France by Doki-Doki.

A sequel titled The Seven Princes of the Thousand Year Labyrinth: Knight of the Eternal Corridor (Note: Japanese: 千年迷宮の七王子 永久回廊の騎士, Hepburn: Sennen Meikyū no Nana Ōji -Eikyū Kairō no Kishi-) was serialized in Ichijinsha's josei manga magazine Monthly Comic Zero Sum from November 28, 2016, to April 28, 2017. Ichijinsha collected its chapters alongside a spin-off titled The Seven Princes of the Thousand Year Labyrinth: -King of the Dawn- (Note: Japanese: 千年迷宮の七王子外伝 －暁の王者－) in two volume, released on June 24, 2017.

=== Volumes ===
==== The Seven Princes of the Thousand-Year Labyrinth ====
No.	Original release date	Original ISBN	English release date	English ISBN
1	January 24, 2015	978-4-75-805990-9	December 27, 2016	978-1-626923-77-5
2	June 25, 2015	978-4-75-803058-8	March 14, 2017	978-1-626924-42-0
3	November 25, 2015	978-4-75-803135-6	July 4, 2017	978-1-626925-06-9
4	June 25, 2016	978-4-75-803201-8	November 28, 2017	978-1-626925-52-6

==== The Seven Princes of the Thousand Year Labyrinth: Knight of the Eternal Corridor ====
No.	Release date	ISBN
1	June 24, 2017	978-4-75-803287-2

==== The Seven Princes of the Thousand Year Labyrinth: -King of the Dawn- ====
No.	Release date	ISBN
1	June 24, 2017	978-4-75-803288-9

== Reception ==
In May 2020, Although the manga is a fantasy, mystery, but only two days after its arrival on the Piccoma digital comic app, was ranked third of most popular work in the action genre.
