= The Tales of Marielle Clarac =

Japanese light novel series

- First light novel volume cover

マリエル・クララックの婚約 (Marieru Kurarakku no Konyaku)
- Genre: Romantic comedy
- Novel series
- Written by: Haruka Momo
- Published by: Shōsetsuka ni Narō
- Original run: August 20, 2015 – present
- Light novel
- Written by: Haruka Momo
- Illustrated by: Maro
- Published by: Ichijinsha
- English publisher: NA: J-Novel Club
- Imprint: Iris NEO
- Original run: March 2, 2017 – present
- Volumes: 14
- Manga
- Written by: Haruka Momo
- Illustrated by: Alaskapan
- Published by: Ichijinsha
- English publisher: NA: J-Novel Club
- Imprint: Zero Sum Comics
- Magazine: Monthly Comic Zero Sum
- Original run: September 28, 2018 – June 28, 2024
- Volumes: 9

The Tales of Marielle Clarac (マリエル・クララックの婚約, Marieru Kurarakku no Konyaku) is a Japanese light novel series written by Haruka Momo and illustrated by Maro. It began irregular serialization on the user-generated novel publishing website Shōsetsuka ni Narō in August 2015. It was later acquired by Ichijinsha who began publishing it under their Iris NEO imprint in March 2017. A manga adaptation illustrated by Alaskapan was serialized in Ichijinsha's josei manga magazine Monthly Comic Zero Sum from September 2018 to June 2024.

== Media ==
=== Light novel ===
Written by Haruka Momo, The Tales of Marielle Clarac began irregular serialization on the user-generated novel publishing website Shōsetsuka ni Narō on August 20, 2015. It was later acquired by Ichijinsha who began publishing the series with illustrations by Maro under their Iris NEO light novel imprint on March 2, 2017. Fourteen volumes have been released as of January 7, 2026.

During their panel at Anime NYC 2019, J-Novel Club announced that they had licensed the series for English digital publication.

No.	Title	Original release date	North American release date
1	The Engagement of Marielle Clarac; Marieru Kurarakku no Konyaku (マリエル・クララックの婚約)	March 2, 2017; 978-4-7580-4925-2	April 6, 2020; 978-1-7183-2226-4
2	The Beloved of Marielle Clarac; Marieru Kurarakku no Saiai (マリエル・クララックの最愛)	September 4, 2017; 978-4-7580-4984-9	June 7, 2020; 978-1-7183-2228-8
3	The Temptation of Marielle Clarac; Marieru Kurarakku no Yūwaku (マリエル・クララックの誘惑)	March 2, 2018; 978-4-7580-9043-8	August 9, 2020; 978-1-7183-2230-1
4	The Wedding of Marielle Clarac; Marieru Kurarakku no Kekkon (マリエル・クララックの結婚)	September 1, 2018; 978-4-7580-9100-8	October 18, 2020; 978-1-7183-2232-5
5	The Intrigue of Marielle Clarac; Marieru Kurarakku no Mitsubō (マリエル・クララックの蜜謀)	April 2, 2019; 978-4-7580-9161-9	December 19, 2020; 978-1-7183-2234-9
6	The Matchmaking of Marielle Clarac; Marieru Kurarakku no Kyūai (マリエル・クララックの求愛)	November 2, 2019; 978-4-7580-9221-0	April 11, 2021; 978-1-7183-2236-3
7	The Holy Crown of Marielle Clarac; Marieru Kurarakku no Seikan (マリエル・クララックの聖冠)	July 2, 2020; 978-4-7580-9282-1	August 30, 2021; 978-1-7183-2238-7
8	The Applause of Marielle Clarac; Marieru Kurarakku no Kassai (マリエル・クララックの喝采)	April 2, 2021; 978-4-7580-9351-4	February 7, 2022; 978-1-7183-2240-0
9	The Festivities of Marielle Clarac; Marieru Kurarakku no Shukusai (マリエル・クララックの祝祭)	January 7, 2022; 978-4-7580-9429-0	June 27, 2022; 978-1-7183-2242-4
10	The Springtime Chime of Marielle Clarac; Marieru Kurarakku no Harurin (マリエル・クララックの春鈴)	December 2, 2022; 978-4-7580-9510-5	January 8, 2024; 978-1-7183-2244-8
11	The Promise of Marielle Clarac; Marieru Kurarakku no Yakusoku (マリエル・クララックの約束)	October 3, 2023; 978-4-7580-9585-3	December 27, 2024; 978-1-7183-2246-2
12	The Labyrinth of Marielle Clarac; Marieru Kurarakku no Meikyū (マリエル・クララックの迷宮)	May 2, 2024; 978-4-7580-9638-6	March 24, 2025; 978-1-7183-2248-6
13	The Blue Sea of Marielle Clarac; Marieru Kurarakku no Sōkai (マリエル・クララックの蒼海)	May 2, 2025; 978-4-7580-9723-9	January 29, 2026; 978-1-7183-2250-9
14	— Marieru Kurarakku no Rakuen (マリエル・クララックの楽園)	January 7, 2026; 978-4-7580-9782-6	—

=== Manga ===
A manga adaptation illustrated by Alaskapan was serialized in Ichijinsha's josei manga magazine Monthly Comic Zero Sum from September 28, 2018, to June 28, 2024. Its chapters were collected into nine tankōbon volumes released from April 25, 2019, to July 31, 2024. The manga adaptation is also licensed in English by J-Novel Club.

No.	Original release date	Original ISBN	North American release date	North American ISBN
1	April 25, 2019	978-4-7580-3428-9	November 4, 2020	978-1-7183-3640-7
2	December 25, 2019	978-4-7580-3480-7	February 24, 2021	978-1-7183-3641-4
3	July 27, 2020	978-4-7580-3527-9	November 3, 2021	978-1-7183-3642-1
4	February 20, 2021	978-4-7580-3584-2	March 16, 2022	978-1-7183-3643-8
5	September 30, 2021	978-4-7580-3659-7	June 15, 2022	978-1-7183-3644-5
6	June 30, 2022	978-4-7580-3755-6	April 26, 2023	978-1-7183-3645-2
7	March 31, 2023	978-4-7580-3870-6	February 13, 2024	978-1-7183-3646-9
8	October 31, 2023	978-4-7580-3946-8	June 25, 2025	978-1-7183-3647-6
9	July 31, 2024	978-4-7580-8558-8	October 22, 2025	978-1-7183-3648-3
