= Beauty and the Beast Girl =

Japanese manga series

- Cover of the Japanese bound volume

ぼっち怪物と盲目少女 (Bocchi Kaibutsu to Moumoku Shoujo)
- Genre: Romance, yuri
- Manga
- Written by: Neji
- Published by: Ichijinsha
- English publisher: NA: Seven Seas Entertainment
- Imprint: Yuri Hime Comics
- Published: July 18, 2017

Beauty and the Beast Girl (Japanese: ぼっち怪物と盲目少女, Hepburn: Bocchi Kaibutsu to Moumoku Shoujo) is a Japanese yuri manga series written and illustrated by Neji. The series follows the relationship between Heath, a troubled monster, and Lily, a blind girl who is unaware Heath is a monster. Beauty and the Beast Girl was first self-published on Neji's Pixiv account starting November 21, 2016 and collected into a bound volume by Ichijinsha in 2017. It was licensed for an English-language release by Seven Seas Entertainment in 2018.

== Synopsis ==
When a troubled monster, Heath, living an isolated life in the forest stumbles upon a blind girl, Lily, who does not run away from her, the two begin to bond. While Lily is happy to spend time with Heath, unaware she is a monster, Heath slowly begins to open up for the first time in her life.

== Publication ==
No.	Original release date	Original ISBN	English release date	English ISBN
1	July 18, 2017	978-4-75-807717-0	February 12, 2019	978-1-626929-77-7

== Reception ==
The series has received mixed to positive reviews. Rebecca Silverman of Anime News Network gave Beauty and the Beast Girl an overall B rating, and remarked that the story works well within the confines of 1 volume to mix both the romance and self acceptance aspects of the story together. Silverman believed the book could be given to "someone who isn't necessarily into yuri, as well as being a good book for a general library graphic novel collection." Reviewing the series for Otaku USA, Che Gilson felt the plot was "meandering" possibly due to it first being published online, concluding that "while the book is cute, it's a mediocre entry in a rich field of yuri manga." Erica Friedman of Yuricon was more forgiving toward the books pacing, noting that "The ending of this comic is very doujinshi-esque, where it ends, rather than wraps up, but it is, after all a fairytale, so 'and they lived happily ever after' is acceptable".
