= We Swore to Meet in the Next Life and That's When Things Got Weird! =

Japanese manga series

- Cover of the first manga volume

来世を誓って転生したら大変なことになった (Raise o Chikatte Tensei Shitara Taihen na Koto ni Natta)
- Genre: Romantic comedy
- Manga
- Written by: Hato Hachiya
- Published by: Ichijinsha
- English publisher: NA: Seven Seas Entertainment
- Imprint: Zero-Sum Comics
- Magazine: Zero-Sum Online
- Original run: 2018 – 2021
- Volumes: 3

We Swore to Meet in the Next Life and That's When Things Got Weird! (Japanese: 来世を誓って転生したら大変なことになった, Hepburn: Raise o Chikatte Tensei Shitara Taihen na Koto ni Natta) is a Japanese manga series written and illustrated by Hato Hachiya. It was serialized in the monthly shōjo manga magazine Zero-Sum Online since 2018.

== Plot ==
A princess and her knight, Sir Harold, vow to be reunited after they reincarnate, as the difference in their social statuses cannot allow them to be together. In present-day Japan, the princess has reincarnated as Yuko Himemiya, a 39-year-old Japanese woman. One day, she reunites with Sir Harold's reincarnation, only to find out that he's a 17-year-old high school student named Haru. The two may be together again, but they must face a new set of issues regarding their relationship.

== Media ==
=== Manga ===
We Swore to Meet in the Next Life and That's When Things Got Weird! is written and illustrated by Hato Hachiya, who originally posted it on their social media accounts. It is serialized in the monthly manga magazine Zero-Sum Online The chapters were later released in 3 bound volumes by Ichijinsha under the Zero-Sum Comics imprint.

In February 2020, Seven Seas Entertainment announced that they had acquired the manga for North American distribution in English.

No.	Original release date	Original ISBN	English release date	English ISBN
1	June 25, 2019	978-4-7580-3443-2	September 29, 2020	978-1-64505-841-0
2	February 25, 2020	978-4-7580-3491-3	March 9, 2021	978-1-64827-110-6
3	November 25, 2020	978-4-7580-3558-3	September 21, 2021	978-1-64505-981-3

== Reception ==
Rebecca Silverman from Anime News Network praised the comic's artwork and romance, while still acknowledging the age gap between Yuko and Haru. At the same time, she claimed that the age gap will alienate some readers.
