= Battle Rabbits =

Japanese manga series

- The cover of the first volume.

バトラビッツ (Bato Rabittsu)
- Genre: Action
- Manga
- Written by: Yuki Amemiya; Yukino Ichihara
- Published by: Ichijinsha
- English publisher: NA: Seven Seas Entertainment
- Magazine: Monthly Comic Zero Sum
- Original run: 28 September 2014 – 25 August 2016
- Volumes: 4

Battle Rabbits (バトラビッツ, Bato Rabittsu) is a Japanese manga series written by Yuki Amemiya and Yukino Ichihara. The series is published in English by Seven Seas Entertainment.

== Plot ==
The story follows Kokuryuu Kaguya as he joins the Battle Rabbits, an organization dedicated to protecting Earth from monsters, to get revenge against the demons who killed his father.

== Release ==
Yuki Amemiya and Yukino Ichihara, the authors of 07-Ghost, began publishing the series in Ichijinsha's Monthly Comic Zero Sum on 28 September 2014.

North American manga publisher Seven Seas Entertainment announced their license to the series on 4 September 2015.

=== Volumes ===
No.	Original release date	Original ISBN	English release date	English ISBN
1	24 January 2015	978-4758059923	5 July 2016	978-1-626923-1-95
2	25 July 2015	978-4758030892	18 October 2016	978-1-626923-40-9
3	25 January 2016	978-4758031516	10 January 2017	978-1-626923-81-2
4	25 August 2016	978-4758032278	4 April 2017	978-1-626924-49-9
