= Dazzle (manga) =

Japanese manga series

- First tankōbon volume cover (Ichijinsha edition), featuring Rahzel Anadis and Alzeid

破天荒遊戯 (Hatenkō Yūgi)
- Genre: Fantasy, romance
- Manga
- Written by: Minari Endoh
- Published by: Enix (former); Ichijinsha (current)
- English publisher: NA: Tokyopop
- Magazine: Monthly GFantasy (1999–2002); Monthly Comic Zero Sum (2002–2019); Zero-Sum Online (2019–2022)
- Original run: 1999 – 2022
- Volumes: 24
- Anime television series

Hatenkou Yugi
- Directed by: Yoshihiro Takamoto
- Written by: Yasuhiro Imagawa
- Studio: Studio Deen
- Licensed by: NA: Sentai Filmworks
- Original network: Kyoto Broadcasting System, Chiba TV, SUN-TV, NBN, TV Kanagawa, TV Saitama
- Original run: January 5, 2008 – March 8, 2008
- Episodes: 10
- icon

Dazzle (破天荒遊戯, Hatenkō Yūgi; lit. 'Unprecedented Game') is a Japanese manga series written and illustrated by Minari Endoh. It was serialized in Enix's shōnen manga magazine Monthly GFantasy from 1999 to 2002, and Ichijinsha's josei manga magazine Monthly Comic Zero Sum from 2002 to 2019, and Ichijinsha's website Zero-Sum Online from 2019 to 2022. Its chapters were collected in 24 tankōbon volumes. The manga was published in North America by Tokyopop; only the first ten volumes were released. A ten-episode anime adaptation, Hatenkou Yugi, aired between January and March 2008 on Kyoto Broadcasting System.

== Plot ==
A young girl named Rahzel is abruptly sent off to see the world by her eccentric, doting father. She is alone on her travels until she meets Alzeid, an attractive, mysterious loner on a mission to avenge his father's murder. After aiding Alzeid in retrieving his stolen gun from a thief, Rahzel decides to follow Alzeid promising that she would make his "lousy and boring" life "more interesting and fun!" Alzeid grudgingly acknowledges that Rahzel will be traveling with him from now on. Soon after, a womanizing acquaintance of Alzeid's named Baroqueheat joins in their adventure.

== Characters ==
Rahzel Anadis (ラゼル・アナディス, Razeru Anadisu)
Voiced by: Sanae Kobayashi
Rahzel, born Rahzenshia Rose (ラゼンシア・ローズ, Razenshia Rōzu), is a fifteen-year-old girl with high magical aptitude. After being cast out by her foster father, she travels with Alzeid. During her childhood, in self-defense, Rahzel killed her mother—who had the ability to see the future and tried to kill her nine-year-old daughter during her birthday—and was subsequently abandoned by her real father. She was later found and named by Kiara, who considers her his property. Following a time slip to the past, she kills the entity known as Second to end its suffering and save others.
Alzeid (アルゼイド, Aruzeido)
Voiced by: Takahiro Sakurai
Alzeid is a twenty-four-year-old albino on a journey of revenge against his father's enemy, a woman with black hair and blue eyes. He is cold and quiet and exerts significant influence on Rahzel. He and his older brother, who shares his name, are clones of the entity known as Second. Alzeid's brother, possessing greater magical ability, defeats him in a confrontation orchestrated by Kiara. Alzeid was nearly sacrificed by Second to become a new vessel, but was saved when Rahzel, prompted by Second himself, intervened and killed the entity. When encountering a time-traveled Rahzel as a child, his isolated upbringing leaves him unfamiliar with how to interact with others.
Baroqueheat Anadis (バロックヒート・アナディス, Barokkuhiito Anadisu)
Voiced by: Shin-ichiro Miki
Baroqueheat is a non-human companion of Alzeid and Rahzel, appearing as a twenty-eight-year-old man, despite being significantly older. The youngest of four siblings, he once loved Natsume and believes Second killed her, leading to his conflicted feelings toward Alzeid, whom he refuses to address by name. He possesses a tattoo that transforms into a sword. His initially harassing behavior toward Rahzel develops into deeper affection, and he frequently admonishes Alzeid for treating her harshly while attempting to provoke Alzeid into acknowledging his own feelings for her.
Kiara Anadis (キアラ・アナディス, Kiara Anadisu)
Voiced by: Hiro Shimono
Kiara is Baroqueheat's older brother and a mysterious figure with a significant but enigmatic role in Rahzel's past. He discovered Rahzel abandoned in the woods as a child, delivered her to her foster father, and named her, leading him to consider her his property. He periodically encounters Rahzel during her journey, offering cryptic advice over tea while she regards him with deep suspicion. He orchestrates events involving Rahzel, Alzeid, and Baroqueheat according to his own scenarios. His younger clone companion, known as the other Alzeid, is a powerful, ageless being who harbors a deep grudge against his brother Alzeid for supplanting him. This other Alzeid feels a strong, possessive connection to Rahzel, whom he identifies by scent and refers to as "Big Sister".
Alzeid (アルゼイド, Aruzeido)
The other Alzeid is the first, ageless clone of Second, possessing a childlike form and significant magical power. Deemed a failure and replaced by the younger Alzeid, he harbors a deep grudge against his brother. He is closely associated with Kiara, who named him Alzeid, a name he despises. He identifies Rahzel by scent, referring to her as "Big Sister" and believing she promised to give him a true name. He and Kiara frame his brother for murders in Acanea, leading to a confrontation where he easily defeats Alzeid. Despite his resentment, flashbacks reveal he once cared for his younger brother and planned their escape.
Soresta (ソレスタ, Soresuta)
Voiced by: Kishō Taniyama
Soresta is an army friend of Alzeid and Baroqueheat. He is obsessed with Alzeid in a very stalker-like fashion, such as making dolls of him, and writing poetry. In an attempt to kill Rahzel, he is killed by Alzeid. It is revealed later that he had been married to a medic named Taylor.
Vincent (ヴィンセント, Binsento)
Vincent is a kid who is being watched by Baroqueheat and Soresta. It is later revealed that he is the imposter of an illegitimate child between a king and one of his servants. The real Vincent died in the sickness that killed the king and all the other heirs, leaving his servant to impersonate him and be delivered to the king.
Jelice Bryah (ジェリス・ブライア, Jerisu Buraia)
Jelice is a friend of Rahzel's father and is like an older brother to Rahzel. He is an eccentric priest who was sent into seminary by his adoptive parents when they found out he had a relationship with their biological daughter. He admits that he does not believe in God, but thinks that the church serves as an important service to the people. His adoptive sister was left by family and after living as prostitute, murdered due to a fatal drug which was being distributed around the town, driving Jelice to murder the man who had sold the "Angel Text" drug to her.
Branowen (ブランオーウェン, Buranōwen)
Branowen is Baroqueheat's older sister, who possesses great intelligence and mechanical skill. Like her siblings, she was deeply attached to Second and Natsume, keeping Second's glasses as a memento. This connection fuels her dislike for Alzeid due to his resemblance to Second. She refuses to take sides in conflicts between her brothers, maintaining her love for all her siblings.
Serateed Anadis (セラティード・アナディス, Seratiido Anadisu)
Serateed is the eldest of the four siblings and Rahzel's overprotective foster father. A close friend of Second, he harbors a strong hatred for Alzeid, whom he blames for Second's death and for appropriating his name and gun. Unlike his siblings, he does not unconditionally revere Natsume, bearing a grudge for her forcing him to test the Angel Text. His protectiveness stems from Kiara's directive to raise Rahzel and the warning that he would one day return to claim her.
Natsume Anadis Takamura (ナツメ・アナディス・タカムラ, Natsume Anadisu Takamura)
She was the one who created Serateed, Kiara, Branoween and Baroqueheat. She was killed by Second, her lover. Each one who knew Natsume and Rahzel says that Rahzel looks like her. Somehow she foresaw her death. Although she was loved by the siblings, Serateed, whom she experimented on with the Angel Text, commented that she carried a large darkness in her heart. She was the one who gave Baroqueheat his tattoo/weapon.
Second (セカンド, Sekando)
Second is the original being from which the two Alzeids were cloned. He is a scientist from Earth who led a colonization effort on another planet, becoming stranded with his companions, including Natsume. After Natsume's death, he spends centuries attempting to resurrect her by transferring his consciousness into successive cloned bodies. He encounters a time-traveled Rahzel and hires her as a housekeeper. Ultimately, he prompts Rahzel to end his life to stop his immortal cycle, an act that also saves the younger Alzeid from being sacrificed as his next vessel.
Taylor (テイラ, Teira)
Taylor is a medic who saves Alzeid after he is poisoned. She previously served in the military with Alzeid and Baroqueheat, where she worked alongside and later married Solesta, who is ultimately killed by Alzeid. In the past, a younger and more insecure Taylor is advised by a time-traveled Rahzel, whom she begins to admire and address as "sensei". She was Involved in Second's cloning experiments and developed a degree of attachment to the young clones.

== Media ==
=== Manga ===
Written and illustrated by Minari Endoh, Dazzle was originally serialized in Enix's shōnen manga magazine Monthly GFantasy from 1999 to 2002. It was later transferred to Ichijinsha's josei manga magazine Monthly Comic Zero Sum, where it ran from 2002 to 2019, before being transferred to the web version of the magazine, Zero-Sum Online, where it ran from 2019 to 2022. Due to the publisher switch, the first three volumes that were out at the time were re-published by Ichijinsha and released on August 26, 2002. The 24th and final volume was released on September 24, 2022.

The manga was licensed for English release in North America by Tokyopop, and the first volume was released on January 10, 2006. They only released ten volumes, with the last one published on January 6, 2009.

==== Volumes ====
No.	Original release date	Original ISBN	English release date	English ISBN
01	August 26, 2002	9784758050043	January 10, 2006	1598160923
02	August 26, 2002	9784758050050	May 9, 2006	1598160931
03	August 26, 2002	9784758050067	August 29, 2006	159816094X
04	February 25, 2003	9784758050135	January 2, 2007	1598160958
05	September 15, 2003	9784758050470	May 1, 2007	1598160966
06	April 24, 2004	9784758050685	September 4, 2007	1598160974
07	November 25, 2004	9784758051019	January 2, 2008	1598160982
08	July 25, 2005	9784758051576	April 1, 2008	1427801681
09	March 24, 2007	9784758052061	September 9, 2008	142780169X
10	December 25, 2007	9784758053235	January 6, 2009	1427813043
11	January 24, 2009	9784758053891	—	—
12	May 25, 2010	9784758055093	—	—
13	March 24, 2012	9784758056977	—	—
14	May 24, 2014	9784758059244	—	—
15	February 25, 2015	9784758030250	—	—
16	August 25, 2015	9784758031059	—	—
17	March 25, 2016	9784758031745	—	—
18	April 25, 2017	9784758032728	—	—
19	November 25, 2017	9784758033237	—	—
20	October 25, 2018	9784758033954	—	—
21	September 25, 2019	9784758034623	—	—
22	April 24, 2020	9784758035071	—	—
23	February 25, 2021	9784758035910	—	—
24	September 24, 2022	9784758037907	—	—

=== Drama CDs ===
Two drama CDs based on the series were released in 2004 based on the first two volumes of the manga.

=== Internet radio show ===
An Internet radio show entitled Hatenkō Radio (破天荒Radio) began on December 6, 2007, hosted by Animate TV. The show is hosted by Sanae Kobayashi who plays Rahzel in the anime, and Shin-ichiro Miki who plays Baroqueheat in the anime.

=== Anime ===
A ten-episode anime television series adaptation, Hatenkou Yugi, aired on Kyoto Broadcasting System television network between January 5 and March 8, 2008. The opening theme is "Heartbreaking Romance" by Kanako Itō, and the ending theme is "Te no Naka no Eien" (手の中の永遠) by Kaori Hikita.

==== Episodes ====
No.	Title	Original air date
1	"Eternal Light"; Transliteration: "Eien no Tomoshibi" (Japanese: 永遠のともしび)	January 5, 2008
Rahzel Anadis recounts how her father threw her out of her home to go see the world and how she met Alzeid, an albino who is on a journey of revenge. In order to get money for their travels, Rahzel and Alzeid are employed to exorcise a usually friendly ghost in a nearby forest. At first, this is not an easy task, but after reasoning with the ghost and engaging in a magical battle, Rahzel persuades the ghost to finally move on into the afterlife.
2	"Wound of the Scar"; Transliteration: "Kizuato no Kizu" (Japanese: きずあとのきず)	January 12, 2008
While going through a town, Rahzel and Alzeid run into a young boy named Elmier who is running from the police. When he is found with Rahzel and Alzeid, they are all thrown in prison, where they meet up with Baroqueheat. After learning of Elmier's revenge for his father's death by the prison's supervisor, Rahzel and the others easily escape their cells but are held up by the supervisor himself and many of the prisoners. In the end, they are all able to escape, but first Alzeid and Baroqueheat teach the supervisor a lesson by beating him up.
3	"A Silent Song of Lullaby"; Transliteration: "Kakumo Sasayakana Komoriuta" (Japanese: かくもささやかな子守唄)	January 19, 2008
While visiting a fair, a boy named Romario gets lost from his mother. Rahzel and Alzeid keep the boy company as they search for his mother and manage to reunite them. In order to pay Rahzel back, the mother takes her and Alzeid to the circus which the boy wanted to see. During the show, Baroqueheat shows up as a temporary clown performer. Near the end of the show, the boy is taken into an act, but disappears. Later it is found out that the circus master was killing children for her dead unborn child named Viola, and Romario was her latest victim. During a confrontation between the circus master and Rahzel, Alzeid and Baroqueheat, the circus master is killed by Viola's own hands.
4	"Must Not Violate Paradise"; Transliteration: "Rakuen ni Furerunakare" (Japanese: 楽園に触れるなかれ)	January 26, 2008
During a rain storm, Rahzel, Alzeid and Baroqueheat are taken into a mansion for a night where two sisters live. The older sister, Madeila, does not want them to stay, but her younger sister let them in. The younger sister asks Alzeid and Baroqueheat to follow Madeila into the cave near their mansion if she goes searching for her late grandfather's treasure. Madeila asks Rahzel to accompany her in searching for the treasure and they all head out during the rain storm. In the end, the treasure turns out to be a fossil of a winged creature which reflects the morning light. Remembering this, Madeila is inspired and is going to run away from home for the time being.
5	"The Sun in Your Palms (First Part)"; Transliteration: "Te no Hira no Taiyō (Zenpen)" (Japanese: てのひらのたいよう(前編))	February 2, 2008
Rahzel and her two companions get lost but chance across a town which takes part in a type of sky burial where corpses are placed on stakes in a forest near town to decay and be eaten by birds. Rahzel meets a young girl named Larawel whose father runs an inn in town, and Rahzel and her friends plan to stay there; Larawel's father even gives Alzeid a clue as to his father's murderer. After Larawel goes missing, Rahzel and the others search for her and eventually discover that the town has changed since Larawel was born eight years previous, and that there is growing belief that Larawel's father participates in black magic in order to keep Larawel alive.
6	"The Sun in Your Palms (Second Part)"; Transliteration: "Te no Hira no Taiyō (Kōhen)" (Japanese: てのひらのたいよう(後編))	February 9, 2008
While Rahzel and her two companions stay in the inn from the previous episode, they go out around the town. When they eat, they find out something about the town: the food is horrible. Alzeid actually loses consciousness from it, and Baroqueheat apologizes about listening to what Larawel and Rahzel talked about in bed the previous night. They play cards and return to the inn after everybody is up, only to find the villagers come to kill Larawel's father. Larawel's father soon kills himself to protect his daughter. Later, they soon find out that Larawel was the one that caused all the murders. A little of Rahzel's past is also revealed, and Larawel soon kills herself. They continue on with their journey afterwards.
7	"When the Flower Blooms"; Transliteration: "Hana ga Saitara" (Japanese: 花が咲いたら)	February 16, 2008
Rahzel and her companions are traveling in the snowy mountains when a sudden avalanche comes barreling toward them, and in the midst of this, Rahzel and the others are pulled down into another part of the mountain. They wake up to find a young albino girl named Ludovika, and members of the village comes to retrieve her. The village leader inquires to how Alzeid, who is also an albino, can go outside, and he responds that it does not take much to enable him to have a normal life. In the middle of the night, Alzeid overhears that the villagers are planning to kill them, so they leave, but Ludovika follows them and helps to guide them out of the forest. The village elder ends up attacking by using the trees, but Ludovika jumps into his attack in order to save Alzeid. Ludovika finally sees the blue sky, but she disappears in a flash of white flower petals. It turns out that Ludovika and the villagers were personifications of the surrounding forest.
8	"Unknown Destination (First Part)"; Transliteration: "Yukusaki o Shiranai (Zenpen)" (Japanese: ゆくさきをしらない 前編)	February 23, 2008
Rahzel and Alzeid are to meet Baroqueheat in a new city, but before he shows up Rahzel gets involved with saving a young boy named Vincent from some robbers, and then getting a run-in with his guard Soresta. Soresta was in the same military unit as Alzeid and Baroqueheat and thus knows them very well. Alzeid tells Rahzel not to use magic for at least three days so that she can learn to rely on herself, though Rahzel ups it to a week in frustration. During another run-in with Vincent's guards, Rahzel manages to get away with Vincent also causing a huge explosion, all without the use of magic.
9	"Unknown Destination (Second Part)"; Transliteration: "Yukusaki o Shiranai (Kōhen)" (Japanese: ゆくさきをしらない 後編)	March 1, 2008
In the middle of the night, men come to try to kidnap Vincent again, but Soresta, Baroqueheat, and Alzeid interfere. Before Rahzel can get away with Vincent, however, Baroqueheat knocks her out, and they take Vincent. Alzeid follows the string that Soresta left behind and has a sword fight with Soresta, during which Rahzel escapes and tries to save Vincent. Baroqueheat once again switches sides and protects Rahzel against Soresta's men. Alzeid manages to win the sword fight, though Rahzel interferes and manages to save Soresta's life. Despite this, Soresta tries to kill Rahzel out of jealousy though Alzeid kills him first. Later, Rahzel's father shows up.
10	"A Present for You"; Transliteration: "Kimi ni Okurō" (Japanese: 君に贈ろう)	March 8, 2008
Rahzel's father, who is actually the man that raised Rahzel after her biological father abandoned her, arrives and throws Rahzel a birthday party. He reveals an intent to bring Rahzel back home with him, though this does not sit well with Alzeid. The day Rahzel is leaving, Alzeid goes to buy her a birthday present, but instead gets some advice from the store owner, as well as meeting a man who tells him of his daughter, whom he abandoned several years ago, and whose birthday it is. The man also expresses his regret that he abandoned her; it is never stated directly, but is clear that this man in Rahzel's biological father. Alzeid rushes towards the train station and chases after the train. Rahzel sees him running and when she gets to the end of the train, Alzeid yells at her that he will not write her or even think of her if she deserts him now. Angered by this, Rahzel jumps off the train, and Alzeid explains that they can only remain comrades while they are traveling together. Finally, Rahzel gives in and decides to keep traveling with Alzeid and Baroqueheat.
