= Strange+ =

Japanese manga series

- Cover of Strange+ volume 1 by Ichijinsha

ストレンジ・プラス (Sutorenji Purasu)
- Genre: Surreal humor
- Manga
- Written by: Verno Mikawa
- Published by: Ichijinsha
- Magazine: Monthly Comic Zero Sum
- Original run: March 2002 – October 2018
- Volumes: 20
- Anime television series
- Directed by: Takashi Nishikawa
- Produced by: Gorō Shinjuku; Hitomi Nishioki; Ryō Tanabe; Taku Horie
- Written by: Takashi Nishikawa
- Music by: G Angle
- Studio: Seven
- Original run: January 9, 2014 – March 27, 2014
- Episodes: 12
- Anime television series

Sin Strange+
- Directed by: Hiroyuki Furukawa
- Produced by: Gorō Shinjuku; Hitomi Nishioki; Ryō Tanabe; Taku Horie
- Written by: Verno Mikawa
- Music by: G Angle
- Studio: Seven
- Original run: July 11, 2014 – September 26, 2014
- Episodes: 12 + 1

Strange+ (ストレンジ・プラス, Sutorenji Purasu) was a gag manga series by Verno Mikawa. It was serialized in Ichijinsha's Josei manga magazine Monthly Comic Zero Sum since the magazine's first issue in March 2002 and has been collected in twenty tankōbon volumes as of February 2019. An anime television series adaptation by Seven began airing from January 9, 2014. A second season was announced for July.

== Characters ==
Kō (恒)
Voiced by: Tomokazu Seki
Takumi (巧美)
Voiced by: Jun Fukuyama
Masamune (正宗)
Voiced by: Ryōtarō Okiayu
Miwa (美羽)
Voiced by: Satsuki Yukino
Ozu (尾杜)
Voiced by: Toshiyuki Morikawa
Dorothy (ドロシー, Doroshī)
Voiced by: Taeko Kawata
Director Mikuni (美国社長, Mikuni-shachō)
Voiced by: Ai Orikasa
Mera (米良)
Voiced by: Katsuyuki Konishi
Kaori (香織)
Voiced by: Wataru Hatano
Nana (奈々)
Voiced by: Yukana
Kyōya (恭宇夜)
Voiced by: Mitsuki Saiga
Kiyoko (貴世子)
Voiced by: Ayano Terasaki
Rusty Nail (ラスティ・ネイル, Rusuti Neiru)
Voiced by: Shoko Nagahiro
Kudō (狗堂)
Voiced by: Shigeru Chiba

== Media ==
=== Anime ===
An anime television series adaptation by Seven began airing from January 9, 2014. The series was simulcasted by Crunchyroll with English subtitles in North America and other select parts of the world. A sequel series was also simulcast on Crunchyroll in July.
