= Magical × Miracle =

Manga series

- Genre: Fantasy
- Manga
- Written by: Yuzu Mizutani
- Published by: Ichijinsha
- English publisher: AUS: Madman Entertainment; NA: Tokyopop
- Magazine: Monthly Comic Zero Sum
- Original run: May 2002 – March 2006
- Volumes: 6

Magical × Miracle is a Japanese josei manga series created by Yuzu Mizutani. It was serialized in Ichijinsha's Monthly Comic Zero Sum manga magazine between May 2002 and March 2006, and was collected into six bound volumes. The English version is available in North America from Tokyopop.

== Plot ==
Fourteen-year-old Merleawe comes to Viegald to learn magic. On her way to her first day of school, she is kidnapped by a man named Vaith and taken to a castle. She learns that Viegald is in danger because of the disappearance of the Great Sylthfarn, the master wizard, who's the most important person in the country. Merleawe is asked to impersonate Sylthfarn, to preserve and protect Viegald and its peace with neighboring countries. Throughout the series she struggles to do her best on the quest to find out the identity of Sylthfarn and herself.

== Characters ==
Merleawe (メルリーウィ, Merurīwi)
A fourteen-year-old girl who just happens to look exactly like the Master Wizard Sylthfarn. She is charged with the task of impersonating Sylthfarn to help the kingdom of Viegald avoid war. Even though she lack the etiquette and magical skills of Sylthfarn, she has a similar personality. She has a cheerful attitude and is naturally concerned for others. At the beginning, it was just her job to impersonate the Master Wizard, but she finds that she truly want to protect the people who live in Viegald. She comes from a family who adore her. Her specialty in magic is making flowers appear out of thin air.
When it is revealed that Sylthfarn is dead, she returns to normal life. After a two-year time jump, she has become a model student. Third in her class, she gives the graduation speech at her school after Lecto has stomach pains from nerves. She travels around the world after graduation and is known as the Silver Haired Saint due to her actions stopping wars and uniting people. When Caldia moves attacks Viegald, Merleawe attempts to bring peace, after which Caldia appoints her as Viegald's master wizard. Her old friends are all motivated after seeing her again and she happily accepts her new duty.
Sylthfarn (シルスファーン, Shirusufān)
Sylthfarn is a master wizard who has disappeared without notice. He is a strange character who likes to play pranks on his friends, such as hiding porn on Glenn's bookshelf. When his diary is discovered, there is only one sentence on the last page: "I must hurry".
Sylthfarn asked a fortune teller to tell his fortune. She remarked that the person is brilliant, but that this "brilliance is matched only by its brevity." He thus found out that he was going to die soon. He then set off to his journey, leaving everyone he loved behind. He traveled to meet his mother but was afraid that she won't remember him so he watched her from afar. When returning, he was hit by a wagon and died.
Vaith (ヴァイス, Vaisu)
Captain of the Black Knights and one of Sylthfarn's closest friends. He kidnapped Merleawe when he realized she looked like Sylthfarn. He tends to joke around and is a bit of a playboy. Although he is shown to have black hair, it is revealed that it was originally white. He dyed it black as a memento of his men who were killed in a war. His serious moments have a tendency to be short-lived, and he is optimistic in most situations. There have been a few hints that Merleawe has a crush on him. He cares deeply about Merleawe and feels responsible for her.
Yue (ユエ)
Yue is very serious and smart. The oldest son of the famous noble family, he graduated from wizard school early after skipping a grade. He entered the wizard department at the young age of seventeen and became the under-secretary of the wizard department at twenty-two. His position is right below the master wizard. Merleawe's Class President idolizes Yue. Yue is responsible for keeping Glenn, Fern and Vaith in line and can sometimes be strict, but he is loyal and caring inside. General Lenalora of Caldia, an oldtime acquaintance of Yue's, reveals she loves him at the end of the story. Yue is unsure of how to react at first, but he is sure he'll see her again.
Glenn (グレン, Guren)
A kind-hearted priest who enjoys drinking tea. He teaches orphaned children how to read and write before they are adopted by new parents. He tries to be kind to everyone, including a witch named Salavy, who was rejected by everyone else except her stepsister, Lushka. Glenn often reminds Fern to be more polite, particularly towards Merleawe.
Fern (フェルン, Ferun)
A twelve-year-old boy whose only friend was Sylthfarn. He is rude, sarcastic and a little antisocial. Merleawe makes friends with him as the story progresses, and he begins to show his more sensitive side. In book three, it is revealed that he is Sylthfarn's body double. That means if an evil spell is used against Sylthfarn, Fern must block it and get hit instead. Fern comes from a Hahze (or Onburu) family, known for their high resistance to magic. He appears to have a crush on Merleawe later on in the series as he blushes when he speaks to her. Merleawe also seems to have a bit of romantic feelings for Ferns as she blushes and seems very determined in making Fern happy. He is assigned to be Merleawe's Body Double after Merleawe is made the Master Wizard.
Seraphia (セラフィア, Serafia)
An eight-year-old princess whose fiancé is Sylthfarn. She eventually realizes that Merleawe is not Sylthfarn, but is still kind to her. She tends to be somewhat clingy when it comes to Sylthfarn, and can sometimes be rather thoughtless. She gradually matures a little during the course of the story. When she first met Sylthfarn, he presented her with a flower, promising her he would bring her one whenever she cried, which was how Seraphia found Merleawe was an imposter. She did not get on well with Princess Fia Luka (the princess of Caldia) or General Lenolora at the start of the story, but by the end grows 'in body and mind' and treats them as old friends.
Edel (イディル, Idiru)
Edel is Merleawe's older brother, who works on a vineyard. He surprises Merleawe by visiting her without notice, causing trouble for her, since she cannot let him know that she is impersonating Sylthfarn. The only magic he knows is calling pigeons. While he is somewhat over-protective of Merleawe, he has good intentions. He buys a farm by the end of the manga.
Ardi = Auris (アルディ = アウリス, Arudi = Aurisu)
A powerful mage from Vilatia, with the intention of taking over Viegald. He seems rather sadistic; a flashback reveals that people believe that his magic was so strong that it "bankrupted his emotions", so much so that he could not understand other peoples' emotions. He is first introduced when taking a cloak that he claims is Sylthfarn's to Yue. He then gets Yue, Vaith and Glenn incarcerated in various ways, to get them out of the way of his plans. Just as he is about to kill Princess Seraphia, Merleawe casts the spell that prevents Ardi from using a protective amulet that he had stolen from Sylthfarn. This causes both Ardi and Seraphia to fall from a precipice; Merleawe saves Seraphia, and Ardi falls to the ground where Yue casts a spell that ultimately kills him.
Francis (フランシス, Furanshisu)
Glenn's best friend. They shared tea together ever since they were in school. He was shunned by the Church in Meseta, where he had served as a priest, after falling in love with a girl. During Ardi's visit, he tries to rescue Glenn by confronting people controlled by Ardi, and by putting up posters.
Louie
Louie is a friend of Merleawe's. A confident, intuitive and somewhat bossy girl, Louie is the reason Merleawe is forced to ask Vaith about his involvement of the Uprising of Selba. Louie's childhood friend, Alfred, went to fight in that battle, but he died. Alfred asked that Vaith give Louie a letter, but it was two and a half years until Louie received it, since Vaith was forbidden to visit the friends or relatives of the soldiers who died. Louie is quite often seen with Merleawe's other friends, Lia and Yoshino. Out of the four of them, Louie tends to score the highest in exams. After the timeskip, Louie has also become a strong magician.
Tirika
Tirika is introduced in the final volume of the manga. An excitable, somewhat dramatic young girl, she is a junior at the school and is also studying to be a magician. She idolises Merleawe, due to Merleawe helping her study. She is sad that Merleawe is graduating, but becomes further motivated to become more like her. Louie, a friend of Merleawe's, often complains about how noisy Tirika is.
Lecto
Lecto is Merleawe's class president, introduced in the first volume of the manga, but does not gain plot significance until volume 2. Lecto is at the head of his class and seems to be a very intelligent young man, and at first seems cold and distant. However, upon learning that Merleawe is a friend of Yue, his idol, Lecto warms up to her, and begins to show his friendlier, excitable side, insisting that he and Merleawe are "best friends."
Lenolora
Lenolora is a general from the Kingdom of Caldia to the west of Viegald. She first appears in volume 2 as the escort of Princess Fia Lukia of Caldia. In spite of her position in Caldia, Lenolora went to school in Viegald, and befriended Yue while they attended the Academy. Lenolora is a very astute woman, noticing things others overlook, and her intellect appears to be on par with Yue's.

== Release ==
=== Volume list ===
No.	Original release date	Original ISBN	North American release date	North American ISBN
01	February 27, 2003	978-4-75805-021-0	April 11, 2006	978-1-59816-328-5
02	September 25, 2003	978-4-75805-048-7	August 8, 2006	978-1-59816-329-2
03	May 25, 2004	978-4-75805-072-2	December 12, 2006	978-1-59816-330-8
04	February 25, 2005	978-4-75805-124-8	April 10, 2007	978-1-59816-331-5
05	September 24, 2005	978-4-75805-175-0	July 10, 2007	978-1-59816-888-4
06	April 25, 2006	978-4-75805-220-7	October 9, 2007	978-1-4278-0139-5
