= Vampire Doll: Guilt-Na-Zan =

Japanese manga series

- Guilt-Na, the doll in which Guilt-Na-Zan's soul is trapped, from the front cover of Vampire Doll vol.1

バンパイアドール・ギルナザン (Vanpaia Dōru Girunazan)
- Genre: Comedy, Adventure, Fantasy shōnen-ai
- Manga
- Written by: Erika Kari
- Published by: Ichijinsha
- English publisher: NA: Tokyopop
- Magazine: Monthly Comic Zero Sum
- Original run: 2003 – 2008
- Volumes: 6

Vampire Doll: Guilt-Na-Zan (Japanese: バンパイアドール・ギルナザン, Hepburn: Vanpaia Dōru Girunazan) is a manga by Erika Kari which takes place in modern time but holds a medieval, Gothic theme. The story starts out with Kyoji, an exorcist who revives the spirit of Guilt-Na-Zan, whom his ancestor entrapped in a cross. Guilt-Na-Zan, who was the greatest vampire a hundred years ago, is now forced to inhabit a wax doll of a very beautiful and cute female, and be a maid for Kyoji. It was translated into English by Tokyopop beginning in July 2006.

== Story ==
One hundred years ago the vampire aristocrat Guilt-Na-Zan was sealed in a cross by a powerful exorcist. In modern times he is released by Kyoji, a descendant of the original exorcist, but finds himself in the body of a wax doll shaped like a cute girl. Only when he sucks the blood of darling Tonae, Kyoji's younger sister, can he transform back into his original self, and then only for a few minutes. He is otherwise subject to Kyoji's whims, be it serving as a maid and cook or dressing up as a schoolgirl to track down a demon.

Only by drinking the blood of Tonae, Kyoji's pure-hearted younger sister, can he return to his true form. With the amount of blood he is allowed to take (1cc, a number set by Kyoji) he can only turn into his true form for about 5 minutes. However, after smelling a perfume created by Kyoji, made from Tonae's blood, he can turn into his true form. However, the perfume has a delayed reaction, so he can never know when the transformation will happen, or what side effects can occur. One major side effect of the perfume is that, every full moon, Guilt-Na-Zan changes back to his true form for that night, until the moon sets but he will only have the same powers as he does in the form of the doll only being able to create flowers and candy.

Guilt-Na-Zan has to defeat evil entities of all sorts for Kyoji, who is too lazy to defeat them himself, as well as fend off Kyoji's idiot twin brother Kyoichi (or, as he likes to be known, "Night Veil"). Kyoichi frees Vincent (a literal bat-man, or a bat who assumes human form) who happens to be Guilt-na's best friend. When the two meet up, Vincent abandons Kyoichi and becomes Kyoji's butler.

== Characters ==
Guilt-na Zan (ギルナザン, Girunazan)
Guilt-na Zan is a vampire aristocrat who was imprisoned within a cross by Kyoeisai, an exorcist, one hundred years before the start of the manga. Before he was imprisoned, he was seen as a lord among the vampires, with dark powers, which included the ability to control "beasts of the earth" and to call thunder from the sky. When he is resurrected by the exorcist Kyoji, a descendant of Kyoeisai, he is put into the form of a very cute female wax doll. His powers were reduced to creating sweets, which he uses in making food for Kyoji and Tonae. By drinking Tonae's blood, he is able to regain his form for a short period of time, most of the time lasting for only ten minutes. He can also regain his true form by drinking Dune's blood, but it gives him the undesired side effect of his skin turning tan (like Dune's). He also turns into his true from on the night of the full moon. Guilt-na Zan has silver hair and pigeon blood red eyes which turn silver when he is very angry.
He is quite handsome, and favors Gothic clothes. He has a strong sense of loyalty and is capable of showing kindness. He loathes his new position and tries, in vain, to regain his true form. He seems to be developing a strong relationship with Tonae. He loathes Kyoji and has a strong sense of friendship with Vincent, though Vincent refers to him as "my lord," but Guilt-na Zan accepts that.
Guilt-na (ギルナ, Giruna)
Guilt-na is Guilt-na Zan's female form, usually seen in a maid outfit. Guilt-na is a wax doll into which Kyoji resurrected Guilt-na Zan. She has corn-flower (or sapphire) blue eyes and very curly honey gold hair which is set in pigtails with bat clips. The wax doll is important to Kyoji, as it was his most prized creation. Kyoji created the doll for Tonae, who was very ill as a child. As Kyoji completed the doll, Tonae became healthier. The doll and Tonae are, in respects, complete opposites, which is why only Tonae's blood can give Guilt-na Zan his full powers.
Kyoji Yotobari (夜帳 響司, Yotobari Kyōji)
Kyoji is manipulative, greedy, and lazy. He has a number of hobbies, all of which he takes more seriously than his job as an exorcist. However, when he is working, he does do his job quite well ( but usually making others unwillingly help him or do the work for him). He has a fetish for young pretty girls, stating that he hates men and that they are dirty. He makes dresses for both Tonae and Guilt-na. Kyoji is a comical character who seems to take few things seriously. He is quite handsome, with long black hair and silver gray eyes. He wears glasses and keeps his hair tied. He is a pervert, and seems to only show kindness to his sister. He apparently made Mitsuhachi Academy's uniforms, adding many details to the girls' uniforms, but simply making a plain black jacket and pants for the males; he states that he sees no reason to spend time on them.
Tonae Yotobari (夜帳 唱, Yotobari Tonae)
Tonae is a holy girl whose kindness knows no bounds. She has chocolate brown eyes and cocoa brown long hair. Tonae is mostly quiet, and is loyal to her friends. She is pure and spacey and frequently goofs off with Vincent. Her blood gives Guilt-na the ability to transform into Guilt-Na-Zan, something Kyoji explains is a result of Tonae's pure heart. She usually wears her high school uniform, but also wears frilly outfits made by her brother.
Kyoichi "Night Veil" Yotobari (夜帳 響壱, Yotobari Kyōichi)
Kyoichi is Kyoji's older twin brother, who was banished from the family for supposedly summoning a powerful demon on the family's home grounds (later proven false). He is rather stupid (although he speaks quite intelligently about magic), but kind (especially compared to Kyoji's shrewdness). After being banished, he stole a number of items (all of which were cursed), which included the cross holding Vincent and the Bat Axe. He is a powerful exorcist, and is always trying to fight Kyoji to take Guilt-Na-Zan so he can use him to take over the world. Kyoji is very mean to him, and calls him an idiot whenever they meet. Kyoichi likes being called "Night Veil"; his ex-servant Vincent and his crude wax dolls called him this, though others think it sounds strange. In Volume 5 he comes to his old family home with everyone else to live.
Vincent (ビンセント, Binsento)
A bat by nature, Vincent has the ability to transform into a man. He has short, black hair and golden eyes which are also apparently shadowed, and so he keeps sunglasses on. He says this is because his eyes are sensitive to sunlight and because Kyoichi told him to, as they made him look scary. Vincent is as spacey and sweet as Tonae and is also shy, but very loyal to Guilt-Na-Zan. He has power over bats and small animals and can use supersonic sound attacks. He is seen to have great strength as well. A pair of giant bat wings gives him the power of flight. He was named by Guilt-Na-Zan after Beyonce, a girl who appears in volumes 3 and 4 whose real name was Vincent. It is later revealed that Vincent is the reincarnation of Beyonce.
Dune (デューン, Dyūn)
A demon who roams the desert, Dune has ochre eyes (light orange/brown), ivy green hair, and tan skin (whereas everyone else is pale). He absorbs negative energy from people (leaving them with only good feelings, shown by two male rivals who get very intimate when he absorbs their negative energy) and uses the energy to become more powerful. This increases his height and apparent age. Fully charged, he takes the appearance of a tall, muscular young man. If he has little energy, he takes the appearance of a somewhat scrawny teenage boy. In appearance, he is very attractive when he's an adult and cute when he's a teenager. He came into the story by taking negative energy from Mitsuhachi Academy. After being discovered and promptly defeated by the protagonists, Shizuka, Tonae's class president, offers Dune a job at the Academy to help stop fights and filter out rule-breaking students. He accepted this offer and is currently working at the school.
Beyonce (ビヨンセ, Biyonse)
A girl that saved Guilt-Na-Zan in his past. She appears in volumes 3 and 4, when Guilt-Na explains how he came to be so sensitive (he was taught kindness by Beyonce). She had a blood disease which ultimately killed her, and though many people call her Beyonce, as she prefers, her real name is Vincent. Guilt-Na-Zan gave this name to Vincent the bat when they first met, realising that he was her reincarnation.
Shizuka (三ツ蜂 志づ香, Mitsuhachi Shizuka)
Her eyes are ivory and her hair is pale sepia. She is a very serious school president, friend and classmate of Tonae, and a serious student. Her father is the principal of the school, and she allowed Dune to stay as a student, to calm down the raucous fights by sucking negative vibes. She seems to care about Dune quite a lot, although she does make him work as a security guard for the school at night (See vol.4). Her brother, Mr. Tamaki, works as a teacher at Mitsuhachi Academy, and is infamous for his inordinate love of food; Mr. Lawrence, the popular English teacher, often reprimands him for this, although to no avail.
Hugo (ユウゴオ, Yuugoo)
He is a master at making dolls and the teacher of Kyoji. He is apparently immortal, the reason being that the blood of a demon (unnamed when they meet, but the demon was given the name "Dante" by Hugo) was given to him in order to save his life. He has wheat gold hair and forest green eyes. He has a very cute disposition and is world-famous. He goofs off from his work, and apparently has a very close relationship with Dante.
Dante (ダンテ, Dante)
Dante is a Stabber type demon who has the appearance of a child with ice blue eyes and black hair. His hands can produce long swords because of his demonic powers. Dante is Hugo's assistant, and is always following him around and making sure Hugo remains focused on his work. A doll created by Hugo, he was the demon that gave his life so that Hugo could live. He is very open of his love with Hugo, which embarrasses his creator. Dante is also very overprotective of him.
If Dante gets really angry (for instance, if Hugo's well being is threatened), knives can come out of other parts of his body, like his shoulders (a possibility of being his true demonic form). He doesn't like meat or sweets, and the only thing that really bothers him is his small stature. He wishes he were taller like he was in the past. He longs for Hugo to acknowledge that he has the soul of the demon from so long ago. Occasionally, small frogs cover Dante, creating a comedic effect, thanks to Vincent who tried to summon animals to help protect he and Guilt-Na from Dante's swords.
Moegi (斑目 萌えぎ, Madarame Moegi)
She has spectrum green hair with emerald green eyes. When she was a small child she had died due to a sickness. She met a Shinigami in the afterworld named Fahrenheit, who had come to take her soul. With great will to live, she made a deal with the Shinigami and agreed to come back to the human world with Fahrenheit controlling her body with her soul inside yet and the appearance of her. She is a friend of Tonae and Shizuka. She is also quite fragile and frail but is a kind girl who seems to enjoy helping out friends.
Fahrenheit (ファーレンハイト, Fārenhaito)
Fahrenheit is a Shinigami who has come to the human world in search of Dune, who is an old friend of his past. He has long, jet black hair and ochre eyes. He has large horns and a fair sized sickle which later on in the manga is discovered to be the thing that is holding back Fahrenheit. It seems that before he left for his job to be a shinigami, he ran away from Dune without saying "Good-bye". With great regret, he becomes a student at Mitsuhachi Academy to try and tell Dune what he never got to say but due to leaving the afterworld and abandoning his position (which is a sin to the Shinigami ways), he cannot speak when around Dune.
He is promised by the sickle that if he is to take the soul of Guilt-Na-zan (whom it refers to as a red-eyed, silver-haired vampire), he can be free. Although he is a devil, he has to act like a normal high school girl, which is rather comical when he is doing things like knitting or acting rather feminine. As much as he sees Shizuka as a friend, he also sees her as a rival in getting Dune's attention.

== Release ==
=== Volume list ===
No.	Original release date	Original ISBN	North American release date	North American ISBN
01	July 24, 2004	978-4-75805-085-2	September 12, 2006	978-1-59816-519-7
02	May 25, 2005	978-4-75805-143-9	January 9, 2007	978-1-59816-520-3
03	February 25, 2006	978-4-75805-211-5	May 11, 2007	978-1-59816-882-2
04	December 25, 2006	978-4-75805-266-5	October 9, 2007	978-1-4278-0459-4
05	July 25, 2007	978-4-75805-303-7	August 8, 2008	978-1-4278-1147-9
06	November 25, 2008	978-4-75805-377-8	October 1, 2009	978-1-4278-1750-1

== Reception ==
IGN's A. E. Sparrow praised the first volume for its unique blend of genres, calling it a "must read".
