= List of Kashimashi: Girl Meets Girl chapters =

The cover of the first volume of Kashimashi: Girl Meets Girl released by Seven Seas Entertainment on November 29, 2006, in North America

The manga series Kashimashi: Girl Meets Girl was written by Satoru Akahori and illustrated by Yukimaru Katsura. Its original character designs were designed by Sukune Inugami and the school uniforms by Cospa. The story focuses on Hazumu Osaragi, a normal, albeit effeminate, high-school boy who is killed when an alien spaceship crash-lands on him and is revived as a girl. As Hazumu adjusts to her new life, she enters a same-sex love triangle with her two best female friends.

Chapters were serialized in the monthly manga magazine Dengeki Daioh between the July 2004 and May 2007 issues. The thirty-five main chapters plus five "special" chapters and one "bonus track" chapter were collected in five bound volumes by MediaWorks under their Dengeki Comics imprint; each volume contains seven main chapters and at least one bonus chapter. The first volume was published on January 27, 2005, and the last volume on May 26, 2007.

Kashimashi was adapted as a 12-episode anime television series plus a single original video animation (OVA) episode by Studio Hibari. The series aired in Japan on TV Tokyo from January 11 to March 29, 2006, and the OVA was released on October 27, 2006. The Kashimashi manga was licensed for an English-language release in North America by Seven Seas Entertainment. Starting on December 25, 2006, volumes were released every three to four months until the fifth was published on March 18, 2008. Seven Seas re-released the manga in a two-volume omnibus collection of about 500 pages each; volume one was published in June 2009, and volume two in December 2009. The series is licensed in French by Ki-oon and in Chinese in Taiwan by Kadokawa Media.

== Volume list ==
No.	Original release date	Original ISBN	English release date	English ISBN
1	January 27, 2005	978-4-8402-2955-5	November 29, 2006	978-1-933164-34-2
1. "The Day He Changed" (少年はその日変わった。, "Shōnen wa Sono Hi Kawatta."); 2. "She Realized She Was A Girl" (少女は少女であることを自覚した。, "Shōjo wa Shōjo dearu Koto o Jikakushita."); 3. "My First..." (初めての・・・・・・, "Hajimete no......"); 4. "Tomari, Confused!" (とまり、悩む, "Tomari, Nayamu"); 5. "Hazumu's Heart" (はずむの心, "Hazumu no Kokoro"); 6. "What Yasuna Sees" (やす菜の目に映るもの, "Yasuna no Me ni Utsuru Mono"); 7. "Girl Triangle" (少女三角形, "Shōjo Sankakkei"); "Bonus Track"
Pressured to do so by his friends Tomari Kurusu and Asuta Soro, Hazumu Osaragi confesses his love to Yasuna Kamiizumi, who tearfully rejects him. To console himself, Hazumu climbs nearby Mt. Kashima to visit the forest plants he loves, and an alien spacecraft crash-lands on him, killing him instantly. The alien revives Hazumu but accidentally switches his physical sex. After the alien broadcasts a world-wide apology for its action, reporters attempt to interview Hazumu, and Tomari is forced by Hazumu's passivity to protect her from them. Hazumu begins adjusting to life as a girl, but is confused when Yasuna claims she loves her. The alien, Hitoshi Sora, along with an artificially intelligent gynoid named Jan Pu, begin living at Hazumu's house, where they are warmly welcomed by her parents. Sora starts teaching biology at Hazumu's school so that he can observe human behavior. Through Sora's helpful hints, Hazumu discovers Yasuna's unique affliction of only being able to see males as hazy outlines. After telling Hazumu about her condition at school, Yasuna leaves Hazumu, but returns to the classroom to kiss her. They are seen kissing by Tomari, who is shocked by this.
2	September 27, 2005	978-4-8402-3185-5	March 21, 2007	978-1-933164-45-8
8. "Bride and Groom" (お嫁さんとお婿さん, "Oyome-san to Omuko-san"); 9. "A Trip to the Beach" (みんなで海へ, "Minna de Umi e"); 10. "I'll Just Watch..." (見ているだけが・・・・・・, "Miteiru Dake ga......"); 11. "The Princess of Curry" (カレーのお姫様, "Karē no Ohime-sama"); 12. "Of Summer Festivals and Cotton Candy" (夏祭りと綿菓子と, "Natsumatsuri to Watagashi to"); 13. "A Little Storm" (小さな嵐, "Chiisana Arashi"); 14. "Tomari and..." (とまりと・・・・・・, "Tomari to......"); Special 1. "Onee-nii-sama Observation Diary" (オネニーサマ観察日記, "One-nī-sama Kansatsu Nikki")
Hazumu does not understand why Tomari avoids her for several days, but attempts to apologize to her. Hazumu recalls her childhood promise to Tomari to one day become her bride, and when Tomari also remembers, she is moved to tears and reconciles with Hazumu. Hazumu and her friends go to the beach, where Asuta tries to cope with his attraction to Hazumu, and Tomari tells Yasuna she is also in love with Hazumu. At school one night, Hazumu and her friends take a "test of courage", an event held in a scary environment to test the participants' bravery. Hazumu ends up hiding in the biology classroom, where she learns her friend Ayuki Mari has an infatuation with someone but wants to only watch that person. After Hazumu harvests vegetables from the school's garden, Yasuna invites Hazumu and her friends over for curry, which she makes too spicy for everyone's tastes except her own. Hazumu and her friends attend the local summer festival, where Hazumu realizes how difficult it is for her to choose between Yasuna and Tomari. During the summer vacation, Yasuna invites her friends to spend a day a local aquarium, but only Hazumu accompanies her. The next day, Hazumu visits Tomari at her track and field club's training camp, where Tomari tells her that she will not lose to Yasuna.
3	February 27, 2006	978-4-8402-3366-8	July 25, 2007	978-1-933164-46-5
15. "The One I Love Is..." (好きなのは, "Sukina no wa"); 16. "Because I Like You" (好きだから, "Suki Dakara"); 17. "Walls" (壁, "Kabe"); 18. "Of People, Dreams, Fireworks, and Hopelessness" (人と夢と花火と儚さと, "Hito to Yume to Hanabi to Hakanasa to"); Special 2. "One Man's Daring Mission: Invade the Pajama Party!" (漢大作戦！パジャマパーティーへ侵入せよ！, "Otoko Taisakusen! Pajama Pātī e Shinnyū seyo"): 19. "Secrets" (秘密, "Himitsu"); 20. "The Day of the Sports Festival" (体育祭の日に, "Taiikusai no Hi ni"); 21. "Cosmos" (秋桜, "Akizakura"); Special 3. "The First Story of Summer: The Night Before" (初めての夏物語。の前夜, "Hajimete no Natsu Monogatari. No Zenya")
Hazumu and Tomari plan to visit the aquarium, but Hazumu forgets that she has to attend school that day to monitor a science experiment; Yasuna offers to take her place, enabling Hazumu to go. Hazumu and Tomari enjoy themselves until Sora tells Hazumu that Yasuna has collapsed; Hazumu and Tomari rush back to see Yasuna, who is grateful for their arrival. Near the end of summer vacation, Hazumu and her friends light fireworks at the river. Yasuna and Tomari become friendlier after agreeing to work together to be happy with Hazumu. When the new semester begins, Hazumu notices that Yasuna and Tomari are avoiding her. She sees them shopping for clothes after school and worries that they have excluded her because she is not a "real" girl, but later discovers her friends were planning a surprise birthday party for her, and is relieved that no one minds that she is a girl. Hazumu and her friends compete in the school's annual sports day. That night, Sora tells Hazumu that she will die in one month, as a side-effect of her revival. Sora also tells Hazumu's friends, and explains that someone close to Hazumu must donate "life grains" to sustain her life. Depressed by her impending death, Hazumu again climbs Mt. Kashima, where she resolves to live the rest of her life to the fullest.
4	October 27, 2006	978-4-8402-3629-4	November 29, 2007	978-1-933164-84-7
22. "Beautiful" (綺麗, "Kirei"); 23. "Concert" (コンサート, "Konsāto"); 24. "False Strength" (強虫, "Kyōchū"); 25. "Hazumu's Feelings" (はずむキモチ, "Hazumu Kimochi"); 26. "The Tortoise and the Hare" (うさぎとカメ, "Usagi to Kame"); 27. "Let's Play!" (遊べ遊べ, "Asobe Asobe"); 28. "The Two Sides of Farewell" (別れのうらおもて, "Wakare no Uraomote"); Special 4. "The Asuta Show!" (明日太のShow！, "Asuta no Show!")
Though depressed in private, Hazumu continues to smile around her friends, who she believes do not know that she will die in one month. Tomari is disturbed and unsure how to act around Hazumu. Yasuna plays her flute for Hazumu, and says she believes that Hazumu will attend her concert in December, more than a month from then. Tomari tries to stay brave, but breaks down when her track meet is delayed until December, and realizes that Hazumu is worrying about her. As a result, Tomari stays home from school for a few days. Hazumu uses money from her part-time job to buy farewell gifts for her loved ones; this upsets Tomari, and she knocks her gift out of Hazumu's hands. Tomari runs away and falls asleep in a nearby park, and when she awakens finds Hazumu asleep next to her; Tomari cries in her arms, not wanting her to die. When the friends go grape picking, they have trouble keeping up with Hazumu's energy. Two weeks left to live, Hazumu states that she fully accepts her fate. Hazumu is upset when she learns that Yasuna has been accepted by a music school in New York City. Yasuna tells Hazumu that she declined the offer to stay close to her, and Hazumu cries as she kisses Yasuna in the rain.
5	May 26, 2007	978-4-8402-3904-2	March 18, 2008	978-1-933164-85-4
29. "In the Bath Water" (お湯の中で, "Oyu no Naka de"); 30. "On the Eve of the Culture Festival" (文化祭前夜, "Bunkasai Zen'ya"); 31. "Report"; 32. "The Last Day" (最後の一日, "Saigo no Ichinichi"); 33. "Decision" (想い決めた, "Omoi Kimeta"); 34. "Connected Hearts" (繋がる心, "Tsunagaru Kokoro"); 35. "Kashimashi" (かしましく, "Kashimashiku"); Special 5. "Secretive Ayuki-chan" (ひみつのアユキちゃん, "Himitsu no Ayuki-chan")
After Hazumu sneezes in the rain, Yasuna makes her take a hot bath at her house so that she does not catch a cold. On the way home, while wearing Yasuna's clothes, Hazumu meets Tomari, Ayuki, and Asuta. Before Hazumu can explain, Tomari jumps to the conclusion that Hazumu took a bath with Yasuna. Hazumu asks Sora exactly when she will die, and he tells her that it will take a couple days to analyze the data. The day before the school's annual culture festival, Yasuna and Tomari separately tell Hazumu that they love her, and that night Hazumu cries alone on the school roof. On the festival's first day, Sora dictates a private report of his conclusions about the other characters, then tells Hazumu she will die at midnight after the festival ends. On the festival's last day, Hazumu tries to meet up with Yasuna and Tomari but cannot find them. She finds Asuta who, after a confrontation, tells her that he and the rest of their friends know about her impending death. Jan Pu tells Yasuna, Tomari, and Ayuki that Hazumu will die that night; Yasuna and Tomari search for Hazumu and find her on the roof. Sora realizes that his earlier analysis was wrong, and that Hazumu will die in mere moments. While Hazumu talks with Yasuna and Tomari, the fence behind her breaks and she falls off the roof. Yasuna and Tomari both rush to catch Hazumu, but only Tomari jumps off the roof after her. They both survive the fall because Sora interferes, transferring "life grains" from Tomari to Hazumu. In the infirmary Hazumu tells Tomari that she loves her and then kisses her. A month later, Hazumu and her friends listen to Yasuna play in the school's wind ensemble concert, and that night they attend Namiko's birthday party, which doubles as a Christmas party.

== See also ==
- List of Kashimashi: Girl Meets Girl characters
- List of Kashimashi: Girl Meets Girl episodes
