= List of Kashimashi: Girl Meets Girl episodes =

The cover of the English edition of the first DVD compilation.

Kashimashi: Girl Meets Girl (かしまし 〜ガール·ミーツ·ガール〜, Kashimashi ~Gāru Mītsu Gāru~) is a Japanese animated television series. The episodes were directed by Nobuaki Nakanishi, and animated by the Japanese animation studio Studio Hibari. The series was based on the manga version of the same name, and followed the original story from the first two manga volumes closely for the first nine episodes, though with many differences. In episode ten, the anime starts to deviate from the manga and after that, the storyline in the anime has no connection with the manga. The main plot in the anime is the drama that relates from the three female main characters of Hazumu Osaragi, Yasuna Kamiizumi, and Tomari Kurusu, and their romantic struggles in a love triangle. Yasuna and Tomari vie for Hazumu's affections while Hazumu is initially unable to choose between them.

The televised series aired on the TV Tokyo Japanese television network between January 11, 2006, and March 29, 2006, comprising twelve main episodes. Four pieces of theme music were used in the anime, one opening theme, two ending themes, and one insert song used in episode twelve. The opening theme is "Koisuru Kokoro" (恋するココロ; lit. 'The Heart in Love') by Eufonius, the main ending theme is "Michishirube" (みちしるべ; lit. 'Route Marker') by Yūmao, the second ending theme only used in the twelfth episode is "Kimi no Tame ni Dekiru Koto" (キミのためにできること, lit. 'Something I Can Do For You'), also by Yūmao, and the insert song is "Hanbun" (半分; lit. 'Half') by Yukari Tamura. The episodes were released on seven DVD compilations released between April 26, 2006, and October 27, 2006, each containing two episodes. The seventh DVD also contained an original video animation episode "A Girl Falls in Love with a Girl" (少女は少女に恋をした, Shōjo wa Shōjo ni Koi o Shita). The staff that produced the television series also produced the OVA. This episode is set four months after the events of the anime series during the Christmas season.

The episodes were licensed by Media Blasters in November 2006. The episodes were not dubbed into English, but still included subtitles in English. The first DVD went on sale on June 12, 2007, and contained the first five episodes. Extras on the disc included two ten-minute talks between the voice actresses for the three main female characters, a small collection of Japanese television advertisements, and textless opening videos. The second DVD went on sale on August 21, 2007, and the third and final DVD went on sale on October 23, 2007; the last two DVDs contain four episodes each, including the OVA episode. The first episode of the series was included with the June 2007 issue of Newtype USA. A re-release titled Kashimashi: Girl Meet Girl Vocal Collection was released on April 26, 2011, with an English dub.

== Anime television series ==
No.	Title	Original release date
1	"The Young Boy's Life Changed That Day"; Transliteration: "Shōnen wa Sono hi Kawatta" (Japanese: 少年はその日変わった)	January 11, 2006
Hazumu Osaragi confesses his love to Yasuna Kamiizumi, but is turned down by her. Heartbroken, he climbs Mt. Kashima which overlooks the city in which the story takes place and is inadvertently killed due to an alien spacecraft crash-landing on him. In order to rectify the situation, the alien resurrects Hazumu, but in the process his physical sex is changed to female.
2	"The Girl Realizes That She is a Girl"; Transliteration: "Kanojo wa Kanojo de Aru Koto o Jikakushita" (Japanese: 彼女は彼女であることを自覚した)	January 18, 2006
Hazumu goes through medical tests at the hospital, but the doctors do not find anything wrong with her physically. Hazumu attempts to adjust to living life as a girl, and goes along with wearing a female school uniform bought by her mother. Hazumu still retains her male personality, and Tomari Kurusu, one of his good friends, attempts to teach Hazumu the ways of being a girl. At the end of the episode, Hazumu is surprised by two strangers in her room.
3	"Hazumu's Heart, Yasuna's Heart"; Transliteration: "Hazumu no Kokoro, Yasuna no Kokoro" (Japanese: はずむの心、やす菜の心)	January 25, 2006
The two strangers turn out to be the alien that brought Hazumu back to life named Hitoshi Sora, and the personification of the alien's spaceship as a female android modeled after Hazumu's own body name Jan Pu. At school, Yasuna unexpectedly becomes distant from Hazumu and Hazumu worries about their friendship. After talking with Tomari, Hazumu gets an idea which may help save her friendship with Yasuna. Her plan involves the two flower plants she and Yasuna planted on the grounds of the school they attend.
4	"Girl Triangle"; Transliteration: "Shōjo Sankakkei" (Japanese: 少女三角形)	February 1, 2006
Hitoshi Sora, the alien who brought Hazumu back to life, begins to work at Hazumu's school as a biology teacher to observe human beings. Later, Hazumu goes out shopping with Yasuna and they end up going to a karaoke bar. Conflict begins to arise in the form a love triangle between Hazumu, Yasuna and Tomari after Tomari sees Yasuna try to kiss Hazumu at school one day.
5	"The Things Reflected in Yasuna's Eyes"; Transliteration: "Yasuna no Me ni Utsuru Mono" (Japanese: やす菜の目に映るもの)	February 8, 2006
Hazumu's class gets the chance to sketch a drawing outside, and both Yasuna and Tomari want to be Hazumu's partner. They end up forming a group of three, but it quickly turns sour as Tomari brings up that Yasuna initially rejected Hazumu's feelings. Later, Hazumu finally learns of Yasuna's unique affliction and they share a kiss after school, but Tomari unexpectedly walks in on them.
6	"The Bride and the Groom"; Transliteration: "Oyomesan to Omukosan" (Japanese: お嫁さんとお婿さん)	February 15, 2006
Now that Hazumu and Yasuna are together, Tomari begins to reminisce in the memories of the past between her and Hazumu. She is reminded of a promise Hazumu made when they were children about one day becoming Tomari's husband. Meanwhile, Tomari tries to encourage Hazumu to pursue a relationship with Yasuna, but still harbors feelings for Hazumu.
7	"Together to the Sea"; Transliteration: "Minna de Umi e" (Japanese: みんなで海へ)	February 22, 2006
Hazumu and her friends go on a trip to the beach. After having some fun, Hazumu goes to get some water for everyone, but is held up by a couple of guys who hit on her. Asuta Soro, one of Hazumu's good friends, comes to the rescue and saves her from the two guys who run off; Hazumu thanks him for the help. Hazumu later clears up a misunderstanding between her and Asuta and tells him that she sees him as only a friend, much to his dismay.
8	"I'll Just Watch..."; Transliteration: "Miteiru Dake ga..." (Japanese: 見ているだけが...)	March 1, 2006
Hazumu and her friends participate in a test of courage at their school at night despite Hazumu's intense protests. During this event, the students split up in groups and head through the school where scary events await them. At the end of the event, the friendship of the three female main characters strengthens.
9	"Will These Wishes Come True?"; Transliteration: "Kono Negai wa Kanaimasuka?" (Japanese: この願いはかないますか?)	March 8, 2006
Summer is finally here, so Hazumu and her friends participate in the annual summer festival. Hazumu's indecisive personality comes to light during the festival several times, ultimately realizing that she will have to eventually choose between Yasuna and Tomari. While watching the fireworks at the end of the night, Hazumu prays that the three of them will stay together for as long as possible.
10	"A Small Storm"; Transliteration: "Chiisana Arashi" (Japanese: 小さな嵐)	March 15, 2006
Hazumu and Yasuna go to the aquarium together but no one else could come due to other engagements. Tomari, for one, had to go to an athletic training camp; Hazumu and Yasuna decide go to visit Tomari at the camp and buy her a souvenir from the aquarium's gift shop. Tomari later thinks she sees Yasuna and Hazumu kissing at the train station, and later that night, Tomari actually kisses Hazumu instead.
11	"That Which Disappeared from Yasuna's View"; Transliteration: "Yasuna no Hitomi Kara Kieta Mono" (Japanese: やす菜の瞳から消えたもの)	March 22, 2006
Angry at Tomari for breaking their earlier promise together, Yasuna slaps Tomari who then slaps her back as Hazumu stares on in shock. Astonishingly, Yasuna loses the ability to also see females after this fight and she loses much of her will to live on. Tomari later figures out that Yasuna needs Hazumu more than she does and concedes to Yasuna on who should end up with her.
12	"Finally, Love Begins"; Transliteration: "Yagate Koi ga Hajimaru" (Japanese: やがて恋がはじまる)	March 29, 2006
Yasuna starts to pack with the intention to move away without telling anyone. Meanwhile, Hazumu and Tomari have fun together the whole day around town. Their day together ends when Hazumu finally informs Tomari of her decision to choose Yasuna over her. Hazumu leaves to find Yasuna, but she has already left. Hazumu tries to track her down, eventually finding her still in the city. Yasuna regains her ability to see both men and women and Hazumu and Yasuna finally form a romantic relationship.

== OVA ==
No.	Title	Original release date
13	"A Girl Falls in Love with a Girl"; Transliteration: "Shōjo wa Shōjo ni Koi o Shita" (Japanese: 少女は少女に恋をした)	October 27, 2006
Yasuna decided that she wanted to be single after all and broke up with Hazumu who then asked Tomari out. It has been four months since then and Tomari, uneasy with what Hazumu said, spent the entire time avoiding her. When winter finally arrives, Yasuna plans a Christmas event to try and pair Hazumu with Tomari. With the aid of Hazumu's friends, and even Hitoshi and Jan Pu, Tomari and Hazumu finally enter a romantic relationship.
