= Kotonoha no Miko to Kotodama no Majo to =

Japanese manga

ことのはの巫女とことだまの魔女と
- Genre: Yuri
- Manga
- Written by: Miyabi Fujieda
- Published by: Ichijinsha
- Magazine: Yuri Shimai; Comic Yuri Hime
- Original run: 2004 – 2006
- Volumes: 1
- Other
- Kotoiro no Hibi to Kotohogi no Kimi to Drama CD; Kotonoha no Miko to Kotodama no Majo to Drama CD "Madrigal Halloween"

Kotonoha no Miko to Kotodama no Majo to (ことのはの巫女とことだまの魔女と; "The Miko's Words and the Witch's Incantations") is a Japanese yuri manga series written and illustrated by Miyabi Fujieda. It began serialization in 2004 in Sun Magazine's Yuri Shimai as Torikago no Miko to Kimagure na Majo to (鳥籠の巫女と気紛れな魔女と; literally "The Caged Miko and the Whimsical Witch"). It moved to the magazine's successor Comic Yuri Hime in 2005 where it continued and concluded under its new title.

== Plot ==
A witch named Reti, an architecture enthusiast, happens upon a hidden shrine surrounded by a barrier, and when she undoes the barrier she meets a sheltered miko named Tsumugi. Tsumugi has never left the shrine, and she then decides she wants to travel with Reti. Over the course of the series the two of them fall in love.

== Characters ==
Gretia "Reti" Dietrich
Voiced by: Hitomi Nabatame
A witch who is an enthusiast for ancient architecture.
Tsumugi Tokigami (鴇神紬, Tokigami Tsumugi)
Voiced by: Mamiko Noto
A miko. She was sealed in her family's temple shrine for her own protection, as the outside world was poisonous to her pure spirit.
Isuzu Suzushiro (鈴代五十鈴, Suzushiro Isuzu)
Voiced by: Akeno Watanabe
A lady supervisor of Tsumugi.
Kami-sama (神様)
Voiced by: Mamiko Noto
God of the Tokigami mountain shrine. She transfers some of her power to Reti so that Tsumugi can live in the outside world.

== Media ==
=== Manga ===
Kotonoha no Miko to Kotodama no Majo to is a manga series written and illustrated by Miyabi Fujieda, which first began serialization in Yuri Shimai as Torikago no Miko to Kimagure na Majo to in the fourth volume sold on July 27, 2004. It moved to the magazines' successor Comic Yuri Hime and the title was changed to Kotonoha no Miko to Kotodama no Majo to. The bound volume was released on July 14, 2006.

=== Drama CDs ===
- The limited-edition version of the manga was accompanied with a drama CD entitled Kotoiro no Hibi to Kotohogi no Kimi to (こといろの日々とことほぎの君と; literally, "Word-colored days and congratulatory you")
- Kotonoha no Miko to Kotodama no Majo to Drama CD "Madrigal Halloween" drama CD was published October 31, 2006

In both drama CDs, characters from Miyabi's other work Ameiro Kochakan Kandan are also featured in a fictional crossover.
