= Mako Komao =

Japanese writer

- 駒尾 真子
- Born: March 16, 1982 (age 44)

Mako Komao (駒尾 真子, Komao Mako; born March 16, 1982) is a Japanese author of several light novel adaptations of manga, anime and visual novel series. This includes a single novel adaptation of Kashimashi: Girl Meets Girl, a manga originally written by Satoru Akahori and illustrated by Yukimaru Katsura. Komao also wrote five light novels based on the Gift visual novel and wrote the original concept for the manga series the First Love Sisters.

== Works ==
- First Love Sisters, serialized in Yuri Shimai and then Comic Yuri Hime magazine, 2003–08, 3 volumes, Story
- Kashimashi: Girl Meets Girl, published by 2006, 1 volume
- Togainu no Chi True Blood, published by Kadokawa, 2009, 1 volume
- Ange Vierge Linkage, serialized in Kadokawa's Dragon Age magazine, 2014–15, Writer, 2 volumes
- BlazBlue light novels, author
  - Blazblue: Phase 0, published by Kadokawa, 2010
  - BlazBlue: Phase Shift, published by Kadokawa, 2010–12, 4 volumes
  - BlazBlue 1: Calamity Trigger (above), published by Kadokawa, 2013
  - BlazBlue 2: Calamity Trigger (below), published by Kadokawa, 2013
  - BlazBlue 3: Calamity Trigger (above), published by Kadokawa, 2013
  - BlazBlue 4: Continuum Shift (below), published by Kadokawa, 2014
  - BlazBlue Bloodedge Experience, published by Kadokawa, 2014, 2 volumes
  - BlazBlue: Spiral Shift – Hero of the Frozen Blade, 2016
