= Ameiro Kochakan Kandan =

Manga by Miyabi Fujieda

- Cover of the first Japanese volume

飴色紅茶館歓談
- Genre: Slice of Life, Yuri
- Manga
- Written by: Miyabi Fujieda
- Published by: Ichijinsha
- English publisher: NA: JManga
- Magazine: Comic Yuri Hime
- Original run: June 25, 2005 – 2011
- Volumes: 2

Ameiro Kochakan Kandan (飴色紅茶館歓談; lit. The Amber Teahouse) is a Japanese yuri manga written and illustrated by Miyabi Fujieda. The series debuted in the [ES]~ Eternal Sisters anthology and was serialized in Ichijinsha's Comic Yuri Hime magazine from 2005 and was collected into two bound volume. It was licensed for an English-language release by JManga in 2013.

== Plot ==
After winning a lottery prize Seriho Inukai opens up her own tea house. She soon comes to employ a regular from cafe Kotoori Sarasa. Together the two gently perform the tasks at their restful tea house and slowly grow closer in the process.

== Characters ==
Kotoori Sarasa

Voiced by: Nana Mizuki
A former regular at Amber Tea House turned part-time staff. She quickly fell in love with Seriho, the owner of the tea house. She is seen as serious and mature, and is sometimes called a "cool lady" by students, but she also has a slightly emotional side and may start crying when she's impressed.

Inukai Seriho

Voiced by: Yukana
The owner of Amber Tea House. With the prize money she won in the lottery, Seriho opened a tea shop that specialized in black tea. She has a gentle personality and is not good at management, but her tea skills are top notch.

Shishio Haru

Voiced by: Yu Asakawa
A friend of Sarasa. She has a mischiefoius side and likes to make fun of serious people.

Hinoka Shiratori

Voiced by: Kimiko Koyama
A friend of Sarasa. She always smiles and has a bright and noisy personality. Her hobby is mainly woodworking and DIY.

== Media ==
=== Manga ===
| No. | Original release date | Original ISBN | English release date | English ISBN |
|---|---|---|---|---|
| 1 | July 25, 2009 | 9784758070461 | January 17, 2013 (digital) | — |
| 2 | November 8, 2011 | 9784758071673 | N/A | — |

=== Drama CD ===
In 2009 a bonus Drama CD was include in volume 16 of Comic Yuri Hime, Ameiro Kochakan Kandan ~ Pink Princess. Following which Ameiro Kochakan Kandann ~ White Engage was released with the deluxe edition of Volume 1 and Ameiro Kochakan Kandan Blue Christmas with the deluxe edition of Volume 2.

Character's from Ameiro Kochakan Kandan also featured in the Drama DC of Miyabi's other work Kotonoha no Miko to Kotodama no Majo to.

== Reception ==
Erica Friedman of Yuricon praised the series, noting that "Yuri in this series is a pervasive atmosphere, rather than a single event or couple. The teahouse may be called "Amber" but it is the scent of lilies that flows through the door onto the street"
