= Kisses, Sighs, and Cherry Blossom Pink =

Japanese manga anthology

- Kisses, Sighs, and Cherry Blossom Pink cover as published by Ichijinsha

くちびるためいきさくらいろ (Kuchibiru Tameiki Sakurairo)
- Genre: Romance, Yuri
- Manga
- Written by: Milk Morinaga
- Published by: Sun Magazine; Ichijinsha; Futabasha
- English publisher: NA: Seven Seas Entertainment
- Magazine: Yuri Shimai; Comic Yuri Hime; Comic High!
- Original run: June 28, 2003 – February 2012
- Volumes: 1 (Ichijinsha); 2 (Futabasha)

Kisses, Sighs, and Cherry Blossom Pink (くちびるためいきさくらいろ, Kuchibiru Tameiki Sakurairo) is a Japanese yuri manga anthology collection of one-shots by Milk Morinaga. The chapters are unrelated except for taking place at two affiliated all-girl schools, though characters reappear in several of the stories.

== Plot ==
The story revolves around the lives of various girls attending Sakurakai Girls High School and the ups and downs of their love lives. While each chapter is a stand-alone story, characters from other chapters do appear throughout.

== Characters ==
Nana Kobayashi
Nana Kobayashi is a cheerful high school student who has known Hitomi Fujimori since grade school and have been friends for just as long. When it came time to graduate from junior high school, Hitomi coaxes Nana to take the entrance exam for Sakurakai high school due to the sailor-style uniform, but Hitomi did not make it into the same school. After their separation Nana was left thinking about her relationship with Hitomi. She is a main reoccurring character and is the focus of three chapters.
Hitomi Fujimori
Hitomi is Nana's best friend and the one who convinced her to take the entrance exam for Sakurakai high school, however Hitomi did not make it into the same school and attended Touhou high school instead. She is a main recurring character and is the focus of three chapters.
Natsuka Katō
Natsuka Katō is a ghost who still resides in the high school she attended before she transferred to another school and later died. She enjoys spending time in the school's infirmary because in life she had fallen in love with a girl named Komatsu who later became the school nurse of the high school she attended.
Narumi Abe
Narumi Abe is a member of the drama club who plays the lead role of the princess in the school play, her upperclassman Tachibana plays opposite her as the prince in the tale.
Chisato Suzuki
Chisato Suzuki has known Mizuki for years now, though does not know her well. In her first year of high school, Chisato tried to help Mizuki out, who had a hickey on her neck, by offering to cover it up with a bandage, though Mizuki did not want her help. Two years later in their third year, Chisato has been dreaming of Mizuki at night.
Chiharu
Chiharu became friends with Eri in high school after being put into the same class and loves to eat the sweets she makes. Chiharu has been in love with Eri for years, but has never told her because she did not want to push her feelings on to her good friend.
Eri
Eri is a flute player and was with the school band, but after she injured her left arm she could not play anymore, she started making sweets once she entered high school.
Nozaka
Nozaka is a member of the literature club, and she writes short romance stories for the school's literary magazine.
Michiru Endō
Michiru Endō started reading Nozaka's stories and over time ended up falling for her. She joined in the literature club, and one day confesses her love to Nozaka and asked her to go out with her.

== Release ==
Kuchibiru Tameiki Sakurairo is a collection of one-shot manga chapters written and illustrated by Milk Morinaga. The first five chapters were originally serialized in Sun Magazine's now-defunct yuri manga magazine Yuri Shimai between June 28, 2003, and November 17, 2004. When Yuri Shimai was discontinued, the last two chapters were serialized in the magazine's successor Comic Yuri Hime between July 18 and October 18, 2005, published by Ichijinsha. These seven chapters were later collected into a single tankōbon volume released on January 18, 2006, by Ichijinsha. Morinaga restarted the series in the October 2011 issue of Futabasha's Comic High! magazine and it ran until the February 2012 issue. Futabasha republished the entire series in two volumes on April 12, 2012. The series is licensed by Seven Seas Entertainment and was published in a single omnibus volume in June 2013.

No.	Original release date	Original ISBN	English release date	English ISBN
1	January 18, 2006	978-4-758-07001-0	—	—
1. "Even if We're Not Friends." (ともだちじゃなくても。, Tomodachi Janakute mo.); 2. "The Summer Closest to Heaven." (天国に一番近い夏。, Tengoku ni Ichiban Chikai Natsu.); 3. "A Kiss, Love, and a Prince" (キスと恋と王子様, Kisu to Koi to Ōji-sama); 4. "This Love from I Can't Remember When." (いつかのこのこい。, Itsuka no Kono Koi.); 5. "Cherries for Your Lips" (くちびるにチェリー, Kuchibiru ni Cherii); 6. "If I Kiss Her Ring Finger" (くすりゆびにキスしたら, Kusuriyubi ni Kisushitara); 7. "Real Feelings." (ホントのキモチ。, Honto no Kimochi.)
1	April 12, 2012	978-4-575-84058-2	June 4, 2013	978-1-937867-31-7
1. "Even if We're Not Friends." (ともだちじゃなくても。, Tomodachi Janakute mo.); 2. "The Summer Closest to Heaven." (天国に一番近い夏。, Tengoku ni Ichiban Chikai Natsu.); 3. "A Kiss, Love, and a Prince" (キスと恋と王子様, Kisu to Koi to Ōji-sama); 4. "This Love from I Can't Remember When." (いつかのこのこい。, Itsuka no Kono Koi.); 5. "If I Kiss Her Ring Finger" (くすりゆびにキスしたら, Kusuriyubi ni Kisushitara); 6. "Chocolate Kiss Kiss" (チョコレート キスキス, Chokorēto Kisu Kisu); 7. "Wish upon a moon" (月に願いを, Tsuki ni Negai o)
2	April 12, 2012	978-4-575-84059-9	June 4, 2013	978-1-937867-31-7
1. "Secret Lover" (ないしょの恋人, Naisho no Koibito); 2. "Classmate" (クラスメイト, Kurasumeito); 3. "Before a Storm" (嵐の前, Arashi no Mae); 4. "Serious House Leave" (本気の家出, Honki no Iede); 5. "Our Story" (わたしたちの物語, Watashi-tachi no Monogatari); 6. "Cherries for Your Lips" (くちびるにチェリー, Kuchibiru ni Cherī); 7. "Real Feelings." (ホントのキモチ。, Honto no Kimochi.)

== Reception ==
Kisses, Sighs, and Cherry Blossom Pink was featured as Anime News Network's Import of the Month in October 2007, where it was praised for being "heart-meltingly cute—and not in the brainless moe-moe way, but because the feelings expressed are so honest." However it was noted that "it may be an emotionally moving work, but that doesn't stop it from often plunging into cheesy melodrama territory." Rebecca Silverman, in a later review of the Complete Collection edition for Anime News Network, commended the manga for speaking out against the idea of a partner "having to be the man" in a lesbian relationship, but also said it suffered from short interstitial stories interrupting the stories of the main plot. Erica Friedman wrote that the stories were "well-executed," and praised the inclusion of the "lovely" color pages that had originally appeared in magazines within the tankobon edition.
