= Strawberry Shake Sweet =

Japanese manga series

- Strawberry Shake Sweet volume one cover

ストロベリーシェイク Sweet (Sutoroberī Sheiku Sweet)
- Genre: Romantic comedy, yuri
- Manga
- Written by: Shizuru Hayashiya
- Published by: Sun Magazine; Ichijinsha
- Magazine: Yuri Shimai (ch. 1–5); Yuri Hime (ch. 6–17)
- Original run: June 2003 – October 2008
- Volumes: 2

Strawberry Shake Sweet (ストロベリーシェイク Sweet, Sutoroberī Sheiku Sweet) is a Japanese yuri manga written and illustrated by Shizuru Hayashiya. It was originally titled Strawberry Shake while it was serialized in the manga magazine Yuri Shimai, though the title was changed when the manga began serialization in Yuri Hime. The first bound volume was published on January 18, 2006, in Japan, and the second on January 17, 2009. Strawberry Shake Sweet's story involves two young talents named Julia and Ran, and their inability to express their romantic feelings for each other. Portions of this manga are presented in yonkoma (4-panel) format, but it makes up only a small portion of the overall story.

== Characters ==
Julia Tachibana (橘樹里亜, Tachibana Juria)
The sixteen-year-old main character of the manga. She is one of the top talents in the company "Shanghai Talent Limited". Because of that, she was initially jealous of Ran's potential, but eventually she falls in love with Ran. She can be very stubborn and difficult, much to the annoyance of her manager. She is sometimes prone to nosebleeds when Ran is nearby and offering kind yet unknowingly double-toned words. Because of her romantic ineptitude, her manager often refers to her as an idiot and incompetent.
Ran Asakawa (浅川蘭, Asakawa Ran)
Another member of Shanghai Talent Limited. She is also sixteen years old but much taller (towering at least 38 centimetres (15 in) from Julia's own height). She is oblivious to Julia's feelings at the start as well as her own. She is very laid-back, sometimes to the point of appearing "out of it". Because of her inability to recognize her own feelings, as well as Julia's obvious infatuation with her, her manager often refers to her as an airhead.
Ryōko Saeki (冴木涼子, Saeki Ryōko)
Julia's manager. She knows about Julia's romantic feelings toward Ran, and is often less than pleased with the awkward situations that those feelings often cause. She is normally calm, but Julia's outgoing attitude frustrates her to no end. Kaoru is in love with her, but Saeki sees those feelings as a nuisance. She is twenty-seven years old.
Haruna Enomoto (榎本春菜, Enomoto Haruna)
Another member of Shanghai Talent Limited. She is a year younger than Julia and Ran. She is in love with Kaoru, but Kaoru prefers just teasing her endlessly. Haruna is easily embarrassed and occasionally becomes jealous of anyone who receives attention from Kaoru.
Kaoru Shinjō (新城薫, Shinjō Kaoru)
Julia's hairdresser. She is very easy-going and enjoys teasing people, especially Saeki and Haruna. She knows about Haruna's feelings for her, but her eyes are focused on Saeki. She takes great pride in her work. She once did the hair and make-up for the female band Zlay (a parody of Japanese band Glay).
Ryō (リョウ)
The lead singer of Zlay. She is a proud yuri lover, and she instantly knew who was the object of Julia's affections. To the other characters, her love for girls can be a bit overbearing. She appears randomly throughout the manga, catching the characters off guard. She offers random bits of advice and can identify emotions of people by their "aura".
Reki (レキ)
Another member of Zlay and Ryo's girlfriend. She is much calmer than Ryo and is sometimes annoyed by her girlfriend's flamboyant attitude. She is very straightforward with her opinions, sometimes to the point of brutal honesty.
Megumu Sudō (須藤めぐむ, Sudō Megumu)
She is twenty-five years old. She is also Saeki's Kouhai and a Saeki-wannabe. According to Zlay. she is someone who is in love with a senpai two levels above her, indirectly making a reference to Sudou's feelings for Saeki. Sudou denies it but Julia commented that "she's totally like that!!", as Sudou admits that her heart starts racing while she's thinking of Saeki.

== Manga ==
No.	Japanese release date	Japanese ISBN
1	18 January 2006	978-4-758070-00-3
2	17 January 2009	978-4-758070-40-9
