= Mizuo Shinonome =

Japanese manga artist

Mizuo Shinonome (東雲 水生, Shinonome Mizuo) is a Japanese manga artist, responsible for artwork in First Love Sisters and the manga adaptation of Princess Tutu.
