= Ange Vierge =

Japanese manga, game, and anime series

- Ange Vierge logo

アンジュ・ヴィエルジュ (Anju Vieruju)
- Genre: Adventure, Fantasy, Magic
- Manga

Ange Vierge Linkage
- Written by: Mako Komao
- Illustrated by: Sakaki Yoshioka
- Published by: Fujimi Shobo
- Magazine: Monthly Dragon Age
- Original run: 2014 – 2015
- Volumes: 2
- Video game

Ange Vierge: The Second Disciplinary Committee Girls Battle
- Developer: Sega
- Publisher: Sega
- Genre: Online collectible card game
- Platform: Android, iOS
- Released: JP: November 13, 2014 iOS; JP: November 30, 2014 Android
- Anime television series
- Directed by: Masafumi Tamura
- Produced by: Jōtarō Ishigami; Tamura Junichirō; Takayoshi Ishiguro; Tetsuya Hototsuka; Motoki Saitō; Shunsuke Matsumura; Jun Fukuda
- Written by: Katsuhiko Takayama
- Music by: Takatsugu Wakabayashi
- Studio: Silver Link; Connect
- Original network: Tokyo MX, KBS, TV Aichi, Sun TV, BS Fuji, AT-X
- Original run: July 9, 2016 – September 24, 2016
- Episodes: 12

Ange Vierge (アンジュ・ヴィエルジュ, Anju Vieruju) is a Japanese digital collectible card game released by Fujimi Shobo and Media Factory, two brand companies of Kadokawa Corporation. It was first announced in 2013. The franchise theme song is by L.I.N.K.s, a group composed of the voice actresses Yūka Aisaka, Mai Ishihara, Yoshiko Ikuta, Rie Takahashi, and Nozomi Yamamoto.

A manga series titled Ange Vierge Linkage by Mako Komao with art by Sakaki Yoshioka was serialized in Fujimi Shobo's shōnen manga magazine Monthly Dragon Age between 2014 and 2015, and was collected in two tankōbon volumes.

A mobile game titled Ange Vierge: Girls Battle (アンジュ・ヴィエルジュ〜ガールズバトル〜) was released on December 18, 2013. The game ended service on December 20, 2021.

On April 20, 2017, Kadokawa announced that further development of the trading card game has been discontinued. A final tournament took place in May 2017, with the franchise's tournaments and campaigns ending at the end of June 2017. The franchise's website shut down on March 31, 2018.

== Characters ==
=== Main characters ===
Saya Sōgetsu (蒼月 紗夜, Sōgetsu Saya)
Voiced by: Minako Kotobuki
A former high school student from the Blue World and the main protagonist. Though she is emotional, she is also brave and supportive when the situation calls for it. Before gaining her powers she was a completely normal high school student who barely had any kind of presence. She uses a lightsword in combat.
Almaria (アルマリア, Arumaria)
Voiced by: Yumi Hara
A mature vampire girl from the Black World. She fights using blood but at the same time she thinks that feeding on others is embarrassing, and thus has not bitten anyone yet. However, after drinking Saya's blood in a desperate situation, she becomes completely attached to her and is able to use her full powers.
Elel (エルエル, Erueru)
Voiced by: Aki Toyosaki
An extremely friendly and energetic angel from the Red World. She is able to become friends with anyone. Her ability is to borrow abilities from her friends, but it only works if there is a mutual bond between them.
Code Omega 77 Stella (コードΩ77ステラ, Kōdo Ō 77 Sutera)
Voiced by: Rika Tachibana
A heterochromic android from the White World. She has a passion for speed and wants to become even faster than before. Her ability is to manipulate acceleration.
Nya Lapucea (ナイア・ラピュセア, Naia Rapyusea)
Voiced by: Sarah Emi Bridcutt
A busty and mature girl from the Green World. She has the reflexes of a soldier (as she is an ex-squad leader) but is also quite carefree and hates trouble. She is also very lazy, always trying to find excuses to avoid working. She feels guilty for what happened to Eins, as she was the one leader of her squad during the time the accident happened.
Amane Ayashiro (彩城 天音, Ayashiro Amane)
Voiced by: Yukari Tamura
The alpha-driver for Saya's team from the Blue World. Extremely clumsy and goofy yet also kindhearted and optimistic, Amane is the central point for the girls' motives, and each of their episodes shows just how they met and become friends with her. She loves teasing her friends, but is also easily hurt despite her carefree attitude. After episode 3, she is sealed within a crystal made by the Ouroboros.

=== Other characters ===
Miumi Hinata (日向 美海, Hinata Miumi)
Voiced by: Yūka Aisaka
Saya's upperclassman and one of the strongest fighters in the academy.
Sofina (ソフィーナ, Sofīna)
Voiced by: Mai Ishihara
Almaria's upperclassman from the Black World. She likes teasing Almaria for the fact that she thinks that sucking blood is a very embarrassing act.
Ruby (ルビー, Rubī)
Voiced by: Yoshiko Ikuta
A fairy from the Red World.
Code Omega 00 Yufiria (コードΩ00ユーフィリ, Kōdo Omega 00 Yūfiria)
Voiced by: Rie Takahashi
An android from the White World.
Mayuka Sanagi (マユカ・サナギ, Mayuka Sanagi)
Voiced by: Nozomi Yamamoto
A soldier from the Green World. She is the younger sister of Ageha who is quite airheaded and a bit immature but loves her sister very much. Unlike her sister, she is lazy and hates work.
Aoi Mikage (御影 葵, Mikage Aoi)
Voiced by: Shizuka Itō
Saya's upperclassman from the Blue World. She is a samurai-like girl who has mastered the ways of swordsmanship, and is quite strict towards her underclassmen.
Ramiel (レミエル, Remieru)
Voiced by: Aoi Yūki
Elel's upperclassman and an angel as well. Though she has only one wing and cannot use her other eye as well, she is extremely kind and optimistic.
Code Omega 33 Carene (コードΩ33カレン, Kōdo Omega 33 Karen)
Voiced by: Minori Chihara
Stella's upperclassman. She adores her younger sister, Xenia, more than anything.
Code Omega 46 Senia (コードΩ46セニア, Kōdo Omega 46 Senia)
Voiced by: Kana Hanazawa
Carene's younger sister and an android taking a little girl's form. She is also Yufiria's mother.
Eins Exaura (アインス・エクスアウラ, Ainsu ekusuaura)
Voiced by: Ayane Sakura
An enhanced soldier, Expend, from the Green World and a top-rated soldier. She always has an emotionless look on her face and talks in monotone, but is quite arrogant and loves thinking about the world's destruction and just destruction in general. She used to be an energetic and hardworking rookie in Nya's squad until she had to be abandoned and was then modified even more, resulting her in becoming what she is now.
Ageha Sanagi (アゲハ・サナギ, Ageha Sanagi)
Voiced by: Sumire Uesaka
Mayuka's older sister and though she is serious and acts like a drill sergeant towards her, she is shown to love her very much.
Aurora (アウロラ, Aurora)
Voiced by: Saori Hayami
Dr. Michael (Dr.ミハイル, Dr. Mihairu)
Voiced by: Mai Aizawa
Clara (クララ, Kurara)
Voiced by: Saya Satō

== Media ==
=== Anime ===
An anime television series adaptation by Silver Link and Connect aired from July 9 to September 24, 2016. Crunchyroll streamed the anime on its website. The opening theme is "Love is My Rail" by Konomi Suzuki, and the ending theme is "Link with U" by Yūka Aisaka, Mai Ishihara, Yoshiko Ikuta, Rie Takahashi, and Nozomi Yamamoto under the name L.I.N.K.s. On February 16, 2017, a 26-year-old man was arrested on charges of violating the Copyright Act because he subtitled the anime in Chinese, distributing it via file sharing software.

==== Episode list ====
No.	Official English title (Note: All English titles are taken from Crunchyroll.) Original Japanese title	Original release date
1	"Starting Potential" "Hajimari no Kanōsei" (Japanese: はじまりの可能性)	July 9, 2016
2	"The One I Admire" "Akogareno senaka" (Japanese: 憧れの背中)	July 16, 2016
3	"The Price of Bonds" "Kizuna no daishō" (Japanese: 絆の代償)	July 23, 2016
4	"A Flame That Burns Through Darkness" "Yami o yaku honō" (Japanese: 闇を灼く炎)	July 30, 2016
5	"Crimson Pulse" "Guren no myakudō" (Japanese: 紅蓮の脈動)	August 6, 2016
6	"A Lying Smile" "Uso no egao" (Japanese: 嘘の笑顔)	August 13, 2016
7	"Real Friends" "Hontō no tomodachi" (Japanese: 本当のともだち)	August 20, 2016
8	"The Reason for Love" "Aishi-sa no riyū" (Japanese: 愛しさの理由)	August 27, 2016
9	"Faster than Anyone" "Dare yori mo hayaku" (Japanese: 誰よりも速く)	September 3, 2016
10	"Emotions Spilled Over" "Koboreta omoi" (Japanese: 零れた想い)	September 10, 2016
11	"The Remaining Possibility" "Nokosa reta kanōsei" (Japanese: 残された可能性)	September 17, 2016
12	"I Will Evolve With You" "Watashi wa, anata to shinka suru" (Japanese: 私は、あなたと進化する)	September 24, 2016

=== Video games ===
A mobile game titled Ange Vierge: Girls Battle was released on December 17, 2013. It ended service on December 20, 2021.
