= Voiceful =

Japanese manga

- English Voiceful manga cover.
- Genre: Yuri
- Manga
- Written by: Nawoko
- Published by: Sun Magazine; Ichijinsha
- English publisher: NA: Seven Seas Entertainment
- Magazine: Yuri Shimai (1); Yuri Hime (2–4)
- Original run: November 14, 2004 – January 18, 2006
- Volumes: 1

Voiceful is a Japanese yuri manga by Nawoko. The first chapter was serialized in the manga magazine Yuri Shimai under the title Voice, and the next three chapters were serialized in Comic Yuri Hime under the title Voiceful. The bound volume, released in Japan on May 18, 2006, was also published under the new title. Two shorts stories are included in the collected volume; "Someone Special", which originally appeared in the second issue of Yuri Shimai, and "Opening", which originally appeared in the first issue of Yuri Shimai. Seven Seas Entertainment has licensed Voiceful for release in North America, and the English version was released in January 2008.

== Plot ==
Kanae is an introverted high school girl who does not like to leave her home and as a result does not have any friends. Her only solace comes from listening to the music of Hina, a singer who releases her music through the Internet and has never performed live. One day, they pass each other on the street, and Kanae recognizes Hina and says, "I wish you all the happiness in the world!" Those words affect Hina deeply, and the two of them become very close over the course of the story.

== Characters ==
Kanae
She is a shy high school girl who spends most of her time alone. She lives with her mother, although the two of them do not seem to have a close relationship. She finds inspiration in Hina's music and thinks of Hina as her "goddess."
Hina
She is an independent singer who never performs live. After she meets Kanae, she sets up an e-mail address and a blog so that she can have more contact with her fans. Her older sister died sometime before the story began, so her only family left is her alcoholic father, whom she has not lived with since her sister's death.
Hiru
She is Hina's manager and a guitar-player. She first met Hina on a rainy day when the latter had run away from home after her sister's death and was resting on the bench where Hiru usually played. Hiru took Hina to her house, and encouraged by Hiru's own interest in music, Hina soon decided to start singing.
