= First Love Sisters =

Japanese manga series

- First Love Sisters volume 1 cover.

初恋姉妹 (Hatsukoi Shimai)
- Genre: Romance, yuri
- Manga
- Written by: Mako Komao
- Illustrated by: Mizuo Shinonome (characters); Reine Hibiki (scenario)
- Published by: Sun Magazine, Ichijinsha
- English publisher: NA: Seven Seas Entertainment
- Magazine: Yuri Shimai, Comic Yuri Hime
- Original run: June 28, 2003 – January 18, 2008
- Volumes: 3

First Love Sisters (Japanese: 初恋姉妹, Hepburn: Hatsukoi Shimai) is a Japanese manga written by Mako Komao and illustrated by Mizuo Shinonome (characters) and Reine Hibiki (scenario) which was first serialized in the now-defunct yuri josei manga magazine Yuri Shimai on June 28, 2003, under the title Koi Shimai (恋姉妹). The manga was transferred to Comic Yuri Hime, Yuri Shimai's successor, published by Ichijinsha. The final chapter was published in the eleventh issue of Comic Yuri Hime, and three bound volumes have been released, with the final one on April 18, 2008. The manga has been licensed by Los Angeles–based company Seven Seas Entertainment and the first volume went on sale in January 2008, but the series is now on hold due to rights issues. Three drama CDs based on this series have been released, the first two under the title Koi Shimai and the third under the title Hatsukoi Shimai.

== Plot ==
During a visit to Tsunojo Girls' Academy, Chika Matsuzato meets the girl of her dreams, cool upperclassman Haruna Kizaki. Even though they spent only one short day together, Chika will never forget Haruna's kindness, and has made it her life's goal to study hard and get accepted into Tsunojo Girls' School so that they can be together. However, things do not go as smoothly as Chika had planned when she finally arrives.

== Characters ==
Chika Matsuzato (松里千夏, Matsuzato Chika)
A cheerful and energetic girl, Chika is shown around Tsunokamizaka Girls' Academy by Haruna, and decides to apply there in order to see Haruna again. She gets easily depressed when she can't understand Haruna's feelings, or feels she has made some kind of mistake.
Haruna Kizaki (木咲榛菜, Kizaki Haruna)
A cool upperclassman, she meets Chika when giving her a tour around the school. Haruna uses her handkerchief to clean Chika's wound when she falls over, prompting Chika to promise to return it when she enters the school. Haruna was previously in a relationship with an upperclassman which did not end well, leaving her unsure about new relationships.
Akiho Kizaki (木咲明穂, Kizaki Akiho)
Chika's classmate and friend, she is always looking out for her. She is Haruna's younger sister.

== Drama CD cast ==
- Chika Matsuzato – Mai Nakahara
- Haruna Kizaki – Saeko Chiba
- Akiho Kizaki – Ai Nonaka
- Touko Hiiragi – Romi Park
- Kirika – Rina Satō
- Miyu – Sayaka Ohara
