= List of Kashimashi: Girl Meets Girl characters =

The major characters of Kashimashi: Left: Jan Pu (top), Asuta (bottom); Center: Yasuna (left), Hazumu (center), Tomari (right); Right: Hitoshi (top), Namiko (center), Ayuki (bottom).

The Kashimashi: Girl Meets Girl anime and manga features a cast of characters created by Satoru Akahori and illustrated by Yukimaru Katsura. The series takes place in the fictional Kashima ward in Tokyo, Japan, and the storyline follows the lives of a group of friends and the relationships they share through life-altering changes.

A normal, albeit effeminate high school boy named Hazumu Osaragi is pressured by his friends Tomari Kurusu and Asuta Soro to confess his love to his friend Yasuna Kamiizumi, however, she rejects him. Hazumu takes this hard and climbs the nearby Mt. Kashima to try to forget what happened, but while on the mountain is seriously injured when an alien spacecraft crash lands on him. In order to rectify this, the alien revives Hazumu, but inadvertently turns him into a female, right down to the DNA level. Afterwards, the plot often revolves around whether Hazumu's new female body changes or does not change her relationships with her friends and loved ones. Throughout the series, a love triangle emerges between the three female main characters of Hazumu, Yasuna, and Tomari, Hazumu's childhood friend. This mainly consists of the characters unsure whether to act on their feelings due to their being the same sex. Another conflict arises between Yasuna and Tomari who fight for Hazumu's affection while she is still unable to choose between them.

The characters that Akahori developed were praised for creating a full bodied impression of the people, and being honest about their feelings, however were described at the same time as "seemingly stereotyped" that gain depth through thoughtful scenes. The visual presentation of the characters was commented on by reviewers, writing that while the female cast "provides a great contrast of looks, the male characters, though easily distinguishable, stand out less."

== Main characters ==
=== Hazumu Osaragi ===
Voiced by: Kana Ueda (Japanese); Stephanie Sheh (English)

Hazumu as a boy

Hazumu Osaragi (大佛 はずむ, Osaragi Hazumu) is a student, born male, at Kashima high school in the fictional setting of Kashima ward in Tokyo, Japan near Mt. Kashima, and is the main character in the series. As a child, Hazumu grew up with his close friend Tomari Kurusu who would often protect him from bullies that would tease him and make him cry. As Hazumu grew up, he came to love floriculture and other disciplines of horticulture. In high school, Hazumu joins the gardening club, but despite his vast knowledge is not the club leader. One day early in his second year of high school, Hazumu is pressured by his friends Tomari and Asuta to confess to Yasuna, which he goes along with. However, Yasuna rejects him, which hurts Hazumu heavily. He goes up to Mt. Kashima to be around the plants he loves so much, but while up there an alien spacecraft crash-lands on him, seriously injuring him. In order to rectify this mishap, and in accordance with his own laws, the alien resurrects Hazumu, but in the process unexpectedly changes his sex to be completely female, right down to the DNA level.

Shortly after Hazumu's transformation, she is unsure on how to live life as a girl and is initially very clueless about typical female matters. Hazumu is also confused about how different people treat her after the change, though Hazumu resigns herself to live life as a girl. Despite Hazumu's physical change, there is not much change in her personality, as she still scares very easily, and has always been rather effusive, expressive and quite sensitive, which makes her fit well as a girl after the change. She has always been quite indecisive, which causes problems in the course of her changing relationship with both Yasuna and Tomari. Hazumu ends up becoming more feminine as time goes on, which is shown through her actions, mannerisms and personality. One exception to this, however, is that she never gets over referring to herself using the term boku (僕), meaning "I", which is usually only used by males in Japan. Hazumu is very selfless, thinking of others before herself and worries about her friends greatly. Yasuna has observed that Hazumu only smiles greatest when she is surrounded by her many loved ones.

After Hazumu's change into a girl, she is shown in the anime as completely clueless about basic matters related to being a girl such as feminine modesty, how she walks, talks, and handles herself throughout the day. In the manga, this is shown to a much lesser extent and Hazumu is able to adjust to living like a girl much quicker and with less direct interference from others than in the anime. In the anime, Tomari tries to teach Hazumu everything there is about being a girl, but in the manga she is very reluctant to the fact that Hazumu's sex has changed and tries to help her as little as possible in becoming more feminine. Hazumu's personality in the manga is more direct than her anime counterpart, such as when expressing outward annoyance towards her parents' eccentric behaviors, and Hitoshi's awkwardly straightforward interferences in her love life. Also, during the day at the beach in the manga version, Hazumu seeks out Asuta when she is being hit on by two guys and asserts that Asuta is her boyfriend, but in the anime Asuta takes the role of Hazumu's protector and asserts that she is his girlfriend.

=== Yasuna Kamiizumi ===
Voiced by: Yui Horie (Japanese); Karen Strassman (English)

Yasuna Kamiizumi (神泉 やす菜, Kamiizumi Yasuna) is a student at Kashima high school and has been Hazumu's classmate since their first year of high school. Ever since she was born, Yasuna has had a unique affliction which makes her incapable of seeing males, and instead to her males are covered in a gray, hazy blur, which makes it extremely difficult for her to tell one male apart from another except through the sound of their voice. Due to this, she was never able to get along well with others; on top of not being able to see the boys in her class at school, the girls who would normally interact with them were different compared to Yasuna, which built up a divide between her and everyone else. She ended up staying alone for years, and she thought she did not mind it; she did not intend to befriend anyone anyway. However, when she stumbled across Hazumu one day in her first year of high school, she was shocked to find that she could see most of him clearly, though his face was still a blur. From that point on, Yasuna wanted to learn more about Hazumu and gradually fell in love with him. However, even when Hazumu confessed his love to her in their second year of high school, she rejected him since he was still a boy, and she was afraid that he too would one day disappear from her vision. After Hazumu's transformation into a girl, Yasuna wastes no time trying to rectify her mistake and confesses her love to Hazumu finally, but Hazumu is very confused by this and does not know what to do, especially since her physical change.

She has been practicing the flute for many years and is very good at it, so naturally she joins her school's music ensemble when she enters high school. While initially cold and distant from others, Yasuna gradually changes and becomes much easier to approach. Her friends in the musical ensemble tell her this, and ask her if she changed due to someone she likes, and Yasuna affirms this. Yasuna has shown herself to be very devoted to Hazumu, and in a conversation to Tomari, Yasuna tells her that she wants Hazumu all to herself.

Yasuna's character changes between the manga and anime in regard to her level of devotion towards Hazumu and how much she is willing to do to be with her, especially after Hazumu's transformation into a girl. The first instance of this is when Yasuna confesses her love to Hazumu the first day she returns to school as a girl, but in the anime she does not confess to Hazumu after the change and in fact starts to avoid her. Similarly, during the time when Hazumu is shopping for her first bra, Yasuna shows up in the manga version and helps Hazumu into a very feminine bra, but in the anime it is Tomari who helps her try on her first bra. In episode three of the anime, Yasuna continues to avoid Hazumu despite still longing for her, and it takes an effort by Hazumu to restore their previous friendship, but Yasuna never once tries to avoid Hazumu in the manga; on the contrary, Yasuna tries to be around Hazumu as much as possible in the manga version. During the time when Yasuna holds a curry party in the manga, which is combined with the beach trip in episode seven of the anime, Yasuna tells Tomari that she wants all of Hazumu to herself and she invited the others to the party so that she could see Hazumu's brightest smile. However, during the same scene in the anime, Yasuna tells Tomari that she invited Tomari and the others so that she could learn more about Hazumu and her likes and dislikes.

Yasuna's unique affliction to be unable to see males is changed from the manga to the anime. While in the manga Yasuna says she has never once been able to see males completely clearly (Hazumu being the only slight exception), Yasuna explains in the anime that she at one time was able to see males, but one day she could not see her father anymore after he got angry with her as a child, and it escalated from there to encompass all males. Additionally, in the eleventh anime episode, Yasuna becomes unable to see females as well, though this is later rectified in episode twelve when Yasuna is completely healed and is able to see both males and females. In the anime, Yasuna is shown to be terrified of males, even those in her own class, but in the manga she merely pays very little attention to males around her, even when spoken to directly, or otherwise ignores males completely. In the anime, Yasuna is shown at one time accidentally ignoring her father at the dinner table, but the only time Yasuna is shown speaking to her father in the manga has her smiling to him.

=== Tomari Kurusu ===
Voiced by: Yukari Tamura (Japanese); Mona Marshall (English)

Tomari Kurusu (来栖 とまり, Kurusu Tomari) is a student at Kashima high school and is a classmate of Hazumu's in their second year. Tomari is Hazumu's childhood friend, so the two know a lot about each other and have many memories from the past. Hazumu would often get bullied as a child, and Tomari would have to come to his rescue, saying that she would protect him forever. After Hazumu's initial transformation, Tomari does not know what to do. Ayuki observes that Tomari liked Hazumu more as a boy, due to the fact that she has had affections for Hazumu for some time. At first, she is very annoyed that everyone around Hazumu is trying to make her more feminine, but ultimately realizes that while Hazumu has changed physically, her personality is still the same, and therefore still the same person inside. Tomari tries to protect Hazumu from the emotional stress Yasuna caused her by rejecting Hazumu by trying to tell Yasuna to back off for the time being, but after Hazumu says she still wants to be Yasuna's friend, Tomari does not push any further.

Tomari is very athletic and competitive, so in high school she joined the track and field club. In contrast to Hazumu and Yasuna who are not athletes and rather feminine, Tomari is a tomboy who does not often partake in traditionally feminine things such as clothing, shopping, or cosmetics. In her entire life, Tomari never wore a yukata during the annual summer festival, and has to borrow on old one from her mother when she finally does wear one during the summer festival shortly after Hazumu's transformation. At least two of Tomari's female friends on the track team consider her very masculine, and like her cool character; one of these friends even says that if Tomari were a boy that she would have a huge crush on her. Unlike Yasuna, Tomari has a lot of difficulty when it comes to her affection towards Hazumu, but still ends up with her.

== Supporting characters ==
=== Ayuki Mari ===
Voiced by: Masumi Asano (Japanese); Camilla Derby (English)

Ayuki Mari (摩利 あゆき, Mari Ayuki) is a student at Kashima high school and is a classmate of Hazumu's in their second year. As a child, she used to love watching caterpillars leave their chrysalises and turn into butterflies. However, she never once thought that she herself would want to be in a similar position—changing into something else—so she merely just enjoyed watching the transformation before her. That by itself is enough for her, she recounts to Hazumu. Using this as a metaphor, Ayuki tries to explain to Hazumu that watching her loved one from afar is its own variety of love, though Ayuki never explicitly states just who she admires from a distance. Ayuki is good friends with Tomari, and Ayuki will often give her, and others, advice and help in regards to relationships. Keeping with her stance on watching from afar, Ayuki continuously observes the ongoing development of the love triangle between Hazumu, Yasuna, and Tomari.

Ayuki is interested in the sciences, though most specifically, biological sciences. During Hitoshi Sora's first biology lesson at school, Ayuki commented that he leads a most intriguing class, referring to the genetically modified sunflowers he engineered which also turned out to be rather harmful. When Hitoshi tells Hazumu friends that she only has one month left to live, Ayuki reveals that she knew he was the space alien this entire time, due to his vast knowledge of science. Unlike her usual self which is calm and generally quiet, Ayuki gets very upset by this news, and pleads Hitoshi to do something to keep Hazumu alive since he once before brought her back from the dead, eventually leading to Ayuki starting to cry. Hitoshi corrects her that his species is not omnipotent and while his people may be more advanced technologically, they are still inferior as a race compared to humans of Earth. After Ayuki learns that Hitoshi will remain on Earth for the next 100 years, she expresses interest in becoming a human collaborator in his observations of love.

=== Asuta Soro ===
Voiced by: Daisuke Ono (Japanese); Doug Erholtz (English)

Asuta Soro (曽呂 明日太, Soro Asuta) is a student at Kashima high school and is a classmate of Hazumu's in their second year. Asuta and Hazumu have known each other long enough to consider each other best friends, and Asuta is one of his friends that pressures him into confessing his love for Yasuna. Asuta is a good deal more masculine than Hazumu ever was, and thinking like a guy, he had planned that even if Yasuna did turn Hazumu down that he would be able to take Hazumu out into town and have fun, in effect helping him dull the pain of getting rejected.

After Hazumu's transformation into a girl, Asuta suddenly finds his good friend Hazumu very attractive, and cannot help himself when he starts thinking about Hazumu in a sexual way. During the time when Hazumu and her friends go to the beach, Asuta continuously tries to remind himself that even though Hazumu's body has changed, the person is still the same, and as her best friend, he should not be thinking about her in a sexual way. Hazumu remains oblivious to the fact throughout the series that Asuta has been often thinking about her in a sexual way. Asuta continues to have fantasies about having Hazumu as a girlfriend as well. Overtime, Asuta realizes that Hazumu and him gradually grow apart from each other, or are at least not as close as they once had been when Hazumu was a boy. He does find it excellent that his friend is now a very attractive girl, but only wants to continue being Hazumu's friend and nothing more, constantly beating himself up for having impure thoughts about Hazumu. In the last pages of the manga, he announces to the others that he has found a girlfriend, and shows them a photograph of her. They remark that she looks a lot like Hazumu.

=== Namiko Tsuki ===
Voiced by: Yuko Mizutani

Namiko Tsuki (月 並子, Tsuki Namiko) is an English teacher at Kashima high school, and is the homeroom teacher of Hazumu's class. As she often proclaims, she has lived for thirty-five years and has never had a single boyfriend. This has enabled her to devote most of her time and energy into her students at school, but she is still lonely. When Hitoshi starts to work as her coworker at school, she becomes instantly infatuated by him, and goes to extreme lengths to show her devotion and mania towards her precious Hitoshi Sora. On one occasion, Hitoshi asks Namiko to brave Hotakadake in order to retrieve a pennant from the mountain peak, which she accomplishes. Namiko's attraction towards Hitoshi borders on obsession as she hangs large pictures of him on her walls at her home, and constantly is thinking or dreaming about him. She continuously shouts loud expressions of her desire to have Hitoshi as her boyfriend and future husband, and even fantasizes about this coming true on multiple occasions. However, since Hitoshi's species cannot express emotions, the attraction is entirely one-sided.

A running gag throughout the series is that Namiko is extremely clumsy, and will very often fall in holes, fall out of buildings (usually out of her classroom window), or off of cliffs. While the students in her class are initially concerned about her many falls, they become jaded by how often it occurs and pay no attention to her potentially getting injured later on in the series. Namiko remains a tough individual though and always recovers after her falls no matter how severe they may be.

=== Hitoshi Sora ===
Voiced by: Keiji Fujiwara (Japanese); Bob Buchholz (English)

Hitoshi Sora (宇宙 仁, Sora Hitoshi) is the space alien responsible for transforming Hazumu from male to female. He arrived to Earth via his spaceship run by an artificial intelligence named Jan Pu, but crash lands on the surface where Hazumu is, killing him instantly. Hitoshi rectifies this by regenerating Hazumu, but unexpectedly changes his physical sex in the process. This is a mystery to Hitoshi for some time until he is finally able to confirm that Hazumu's "life grain" count is slowly dissipating, and by the time Hitoshi confirms this, Hazumu only has one month left to live. Hitoshi originally came to Earth as a cultural anthropologist and to study the emotions of the human race since his species has long-since given up any emotion at all. Hitoshi recounts that at the peak of his people's civilization, they had discovered the means to destroy all life in the entire universe instantly, so in order to prevent this from ever happening, his people chose to discard their emotions. However, even after becoming a calm, logical race where emotional clashes such as violence and war disappeared completely, his people also started to lose their sexual urges in order to propagate his species further. In their current situation, if something is not done soon, his entire species will soon become extinct, which is why he is on Earth to find a way to save his species. He arrives at the conclusion that his species needs to remember how to love each other in order to survive, so love becomes a focus of his research. In order to observe humans more closely, along with Hazumu and her ongoing relationship with Yasuna and Tomari, Hitoshi starts working at Hazumu's school as a biology teacher, and inadvertently becomes the target of Namiko's extreme affections.

Five members of the supporting cast (from left to right): Namiko, Hitoshi, Jan Pu, Toru, and Kahoru.

Hitoshi has an utter lack of human customs and way of life, and due to this unfamiliarity, his comments often provide the series with an outside perspective on love. More than anything else, Hitoshi is constantly butting in on Hazumu's love affairs, which greatly annoys her to no end as the series progresses. Throughout the series, his views on other subjects such as friendly competition or war provide a somewhat existentialist point of view. Hitoshi continuously follows Hazumu around during outings with his friends in order to further observe her and her friends.

=== Jan Pu ===
Voiced by: Ryōko Shintani (Japanese); Blair Allan (English)

Jan Pu (ジャン・プウ, Jan Pū) is an artificial intelligence owned by Hitoshi Sora as the automatic pilot of his spaceship. Her first appearance has her in disembodied form as the navigator of Hitoshi's ship and she is responsible for the crash landing on Earth and for killing Hazumu. When Hitoshi comes to Earth to live in Hazumu's house, he constructs a gynoid modeled after Hazumu's own new female body, so Jan Pu looks about the same age as Hazumu, and their faces bear a striking resemblance. Jan Pu has the unique ability of levitation, and is able to bend light around her so others cannot see her. Other than technically being an artificial being, she generally acts like a human child due to being enthusiastic about meeting new people and possessing little to no social skills for a girl who looks to be the age of seventeen. At home, Hazumu and Jan Pu have been known to take baths together and they sleep together in the same bed every night. Additionally, Jan Pu can eat and finds curry to be delicious. Hazumu's parents take an instant liking to Jan Pu since now they have two girls to dress up and take pictures of. When Jan Pu meets Hazumu's friends for the first time, she is introduced as Hazumu's cousin. Jan Pu loves Hazumu very much, and Hitoshi even had to give her a definition for "love" once she came to Earth in order to describe the emotion she was feeling for Hazumu. She addresses Hazumu as onee-nii-sama (お姉兄さま; literally "older sister-brother"), and often says the nonsensical word "pū" during exclamations of emotion.

=== Hazumu's parents ===
Voiced by: Makoto Yasumura (Japanese); Dave Mallow (English) (Toru), Voiced by: Yuko Nagashima (Japanese); Mari Devon (English) (Kahoru)

Hazumu's parents, her father Toru Osaragi (大佛 徹, Osaragi Tōru), and her mother Kahoru Osaragi (大佛 かほる, Osaragi Kahoru), are almost always shown together throughout the series. When Hazumu goes missing after getting rejected from Yasuna, both of Hazumu's parents are completely distraught, and do not know what to do. After Hazumu's transformation, both parents become overjoyed to have a daughter in place of a son which is shown through their eccentricities. Toru works as a magazine photographer and loves to take pictures of Hazumu any chance he gets; often this is after his wife has already dressed Hazumu in some feminine garment. Additionally, Hazumu's father repeatedly attempts to take a bath with Hazumu, but is always stopped by his wife. Kahoru loves to buy feminine clothes for Hazumu to wear, and buys these clothes without consulting Hazumu, though regardless Hazumu finds herself wearing them anyway. Directly after Hazumu turned into a girl, her mother even goes ahead and buys her a female school uniform. Hazumu becomes annoyed by her parents' new behavior toward her, and finds trying on her new clothes very tiring. When Hazumu bakes cookies for the first time, Kahoru loves it, but Toru simply wolfs down most of the cookies for himself. Since his mother had always wanted a daughter instead of son, she often dressed Hazumu up in young girl's clothes, saying that gender discrimination is not a good thing.

== Reception ==
The characters of Kashimashi have received praise and criticism from several publications for anime, manga, and other media. The anime reviewing website T.H.E.M. Anime Reviews considered the "characters, as they are, [to] bring much of the believability of the show, despite the alien elements", and noted "the rather soft and detailed art style does help, of course, as does the generally great animation quality." Mania felt that "Yukimaru's art works quite well with this story." The characters were described as "all very cute" and lauded Yukimaru Katsura for doing "an excellent job expressing character's emotions through their facial expressions." Anime News Network (ANN) reviewed Katsura's art, writing that "[s]he knows how to draw characters that are distinctive and appealing in whatever outfits [s]he put[s] them in." While the female cast "provides a great contrast of looks" according to ANN, "the male characters, though easily distinguishable, stand out less."

The characters are felt to be "sympathetic in their own ways" according to Mania, and that the "upfront nature" of the characters is found to be "surpris[ing] and captivat[ing]" in the anime version. Active Anime found the characters to be "merely confused and dealing with overwhelming feelings after a bizarre twist of fate," and state that the character development "create[s] a full bodied impression of the people." ANN wrote that the "characters are honest about their feelings", although are at the same time "seemingly stereotyped" that gain depth through thoughtful scenes. Hazumu is described as "breez[ing] into his new role as a member of the female gender, some minor issues notwithstanding." However, Hazumu is thought of being a "weak link" and a "simple character". The drastic change in Hazumu's father's attitude towards his daughter after her change is construed as "somewhat creepy" in two reviews, and he is labeled a "sicko" in another. Asuta, after Hazumu's change, is thought to be a "gimpy guy who is the comic relief", and "funny-but-pathetic".
