= Kashimashi: Girl Meets Girl =

Japanese yuri manga and its franchise

- The first volume of Kashimashi: Girl Meets Girl, published by Seven Seas Entertainment, featuring Tomari (left), Hazumu (center), and Yasuna (right)

かしまし ～ガール・ミーツ・ガール～ (Kashimashi ~Gāru Mītsu Gāru~)
- Genre: Romantic comedy; Science fiction; Yuri
- Manga
- Written by: Satoru Akahori
- Illustrated by: Yukimaru Katsura
- Published by: MediaWorks
- English publisher: NA: Seven Seas Entertainment
- Magazine: Dengeki Daioh
- Original run: July 2004 – May 2007
- Volumes: 5
- Light novel
- Written by: Mako Komao
- Illustrated by: Yukimaru Katsura
- Published by: MediaWorks
- Imprint: Dengeki Bunko
- Published: January 10, 2006
- Anime television series
- Directed by: Nobuaki Nakanishi
- Written by: Jukki Hanada
- Studio: Studio Hibari
- Licensed by: NA: Discotek Media
- Original network: TV Tokyo
- Original run: January 11, 2006 – March 29, 2006
- Episodes: 12
- Video game

Kashimashi: Girl Meets Girl The First Summer Story
- Developer: Vridge
- Publisher: Marvelous Interactive
- Genre: Visual novel
- Platform: PlayStation 2
- Released: March 30, 2006 (original); November 16, 2006 (re-release)
- Original video animation
- Directed by: Nobuaki Nakanishi
- Written by: Jukki Hanada
- Studio: Studio Hibari
- Licensed by: NA: Discotek Media
- Released: October 27, 2006
- Runtime: 27 minutes

Kashimashi: Girl Meets Girl (かしまし ～ガール・ミーツ・ガール～, Kashimashi ~Gāru Mītsu Gāru~) is a Japanese yuri manga series written by Satoru Akahori and illustrated by Yukimaru Katsura. The manga was originally serialized in Dengeki Daioh between the July 2004 and May 2007 issues, and later published in five bound volumes by MediaWorks from January 2005 to May 2007. The story focuses on Hazumu Osaragi, a normal, albeit effeminate high school boy who is killed when an alien spaceship crash lands on him, only to be restored to health as a girl. This results in a same-sex love triangle that Hazumu finds herself in with two of her best female friends.

A single light novel written by Mako Komao and illustrated by the manga's artist was published by MediaWorks under their Dengeki Bunko imprint in January 2006. The manga series was adapted into a twelve-episode anime television series plus a single original video animation (OVA) sequel by Studio Hibari. The anime aired in Japan on TV Tokyo between January and March 2006; the OVA was released in October 2006. A visual novel was created based on the series for the PlayStation 2 and was released in March 2006. Seven Seas Entertainment licensed the manga series for English-language publication in North America and released the five volumes between December 2006 and March 2008. Media Blasters licensed the anime series, including the OVA, and released three DVD volumes between June and October 2007 with English-subtitles. Media Blasters re-released the anime with an English dub.

The manga has been given positive reviews by the popular anime and manga magazine Newtype USA, and at the online resources Anime News Network and IGN. The first manga volume was Newtype USA's Book of the Month for December 2006, and Newtype's noted Seven Seas Entertainment's "fan-focused" translation without an effort to localize the humor for the mainstream American market. In July 2007, Kashimashi was Seven Seas Entertainment's best-selling title. The anime has been likened to Rumiko Takahashi's Ranma ½, though only as far as the gender-swaps themes. Critics of the anime praised the down to earth characters, and the generally great animation quality with its soft and detailed art style.

== Plot ==
At the start of Kashimashi, a young high school boy named Hazumu Osaragi declares his love to classmate and close friend Yasuna Kamiizumi, but she quickly rejects him. Dejected, Hazumu climbs Mt. Kashima and is killed when an alien spacecraft accidentally crash lands on him. To rectify this, the alien in the ship named Hitoshi Sora brings Hazumu back to life, but inadvertently regenerates him as a female right down to the DNA level. This change in Hazumu serves as the catalyst for the development of character interactions for the remainder of the series.

After Hazumu returns to school, Yasuna unexpectedly professes her love for Hazumu, but this serves only to confuse Hazumu as she adjusts to her new life as a girl. Yasuna, a rather feminine girl, has a unique affliction which makes her incapable of seeing males, and instead sees males as covered in a gray, hazy blur. Hazumu's childhood friend Tomari Kurusu, an athletic girl and tomboy, finds Hazumu's change difficult to cope with. Tomari starts to realize her own romantic feelings for Hazumu as Yasuna starts becoming closer to Hazumu, especially after Tomari witnesses Hazumu and Yasuna kissing one day after school. A conflict arises between Yasuna and Tomari who fight for Hazumu's affection while she is unable to choose between them. This results in a love triangle emerging between the three female main characters. Hazumu's best male friend Asuta Soro also starts having romantic feelings for Hazumu, but tries his best to repress them. Tomari's good friend Ayuki Mari, an intelligent girl interested in the sciences, continuously observes the ongoing development of the love triangle while keeping a stance of watching from afar.

The very stoic Hitoshi originally came to Earth in order to study human emotions, especially those related to love, in an attempt to save his species from extinction. His species has long-since given up their emotions resulting in a loss of their sexual urges and thus a continuously dwindling population. Hitoshi moves into Hazumu's home where he is warmly welcomed by Hazumu's parents. He brings with him an artificially intelligent gynoid named Jan Pu which serves as the automatic pilot for his spaceship. Jan Pu's body is modeled after Hazumu's own female body, and possesses an energetic and childish personality.

While initially citing Hazumu's change as an accident, Hitoshi later realizes this was an unexpected result of the regeneration process. By the time Hitoshi becomes aware of his mistake, he tells Hazumu and her friends she has only one month left to live. Hitoshi explains to Hazumu's friends how someone very close to Hazumu has to donate "life grains" to Hazumu to sustain her life. While unaware her friends know about her impending death, Hazumu continues to live her life and comes to fully accept her fate. The day Hazumu is appointed to die, she falls off the school's roof and Tomari jumps off the roof in an attempt to save her. While in mid-air, Hitoshi interferes by transferring the necessary "life grains" to Hazumu, and both survive the fall. When they later wake up in the infirmary, Hazumu confesses her love to Tomari, effectively choosing her over Yasuna.

The anime ends differently, with no life-threatening situation and Hazumu choosing Yasuna in order to help cure her worsening sight problem as it begins to degrade so she can no longer see girls as well. Afterwards however, Yasuna, who becomes able to see all people again, decides to break up with Hazumu, saying she can stand on her own, and in the follow-up original video animation episode, Hazumu confesses her love to Tomari on Christmas and the two get married in a ceremony held by Hitoshi.

== Production ==
When it was decided that Kashimashi: Girl Meets Girl would begin serialization in MediaWorks' manga magazine Dengeki Daioh, Satoru Akahori wondered what kind of a message he could send to the readers, and eventually decided he wanted to write a steady message of "true love". Akahori noted that up to the creation of Kashimashi, the works that he created were far apart from the concept of true love, and much of his previous work involved a lot of ecchi content which Akahori was attempting to avoid in Kashimashi. He wondered if the story would be interesting, and if he could surprise normal readers and fans of his previous works, if he wrote a true love story without much ecchi or fan service.

When thinking on how to write about true love, Akahori considered laughingly that in normal relationships between boys and girls, it eventually tends towards having sex. In order to avoid this, he chose to have a cast of female main characters, but he felt that audiences have experienced this before and that it thus would not be enough. This is when he thought up the idea of changing the main character from a boy to a girl. Akahori knew this would be a problem, since normally changing a person's gender would cause complications, one of them being that the now-female character would invariably want to return to being male. He knew that there were a few problems that could not be avoided, but he wanted to remove the desire to turn back into a male. For this reason, Akahori devised that the character would not want to turn back into a male if there was the impact of the entire world already having accepted the fact that his gender had changed. To do this, Akahori decided to have the alien who crashed into the character to not only revive the character as a female, but to broadcast this over the entire world, which is what happens at the beginning of Kashimashi. Afterwards, Akahori felt it necessary to expand on the alien's role in the story. At this point in the development process, Akahori felt he could now begin writing the story.

The title Kashimashi loosely translates as "noisy, boisterous, or clamorous" and is derived from the Japanese phrase, "When three women gather, it is noisy" (女三人寄れば姦しい, Onna sannin yoreba kashimashii). The main title was originally romanized as Kasimasi in accordance with Kunrei-shiki romanization, but this was later changed in the English adaptations to Kashimashi in accordance with Hepburn romanization.

== Media ==
=== Manga ===
The Kashimashi manga is written by Satoru Akahori and illustrated by Yukimaru Katsura. The original character designs were created by Sukune Inugami and the school uniform was designed by the company Cospa. It was serialized between the July 2004 and May 2007 issues of the monthly manga magazine Dengeki Daioh, sold between May 21, 2004, and March 21, 2007, respectively. Five bound volumes were released in Japan between January 27, 2005, and May 26, 2007, published under MediaWorks' Dengeki Comics imprint, concluding the series at thirty-five chapters.

The manga was licensed for an English-language release in North America by Seven Seas Entertainment using the revised Hepburn romanization of the title, Kashimashi, unlike the traditional name of Kasimasi. The first volume was released on December 25, 2006, with volumes released every three to four months until the fifth volume was published on March 18, 2008. Seven Seas re-released the manga in a two-volume omnibus collection of roughly 500 pages each; volume one was published in June 2009, followed by volume two in December 2009. The series is also licensed in French by Ki-oon and in Chinese in Taiwan by Kadokawa Media.

=== Internet radio shows ===
There have been two Internet radio shows for the Kashimashi series. The first show, entitled Kana, Yui, Yukari's Kashima Radio (佳奈・由衣・ゆかりのかしましらじお, Kana, Yui, Yukari no Kashima Radio), was produced by Beat Net Radio beginning with a pre-broadcast on September 30, 2005, and concluding on October 27, 2006, with fifty-six episodes. As implied in the title, the show was hosted by Kana Ueda, Yui Horie, and Yukari Tamura, who voiced Hazumu, Yasuna, and Tomari in the anime, respectively. Multiple guests appeared on the show such as Yūmao, who sung the anime's ending theme "Michishirube", or other voice actors from the anime such as Ryōko Shintani, who voiced Jan Pu, and Daisuke Ono, who voiced Asuta. The radio show's opening theme song was "Compass: Egao no Yukue" sung by Ueda, Horie, and Tamura. Listeners could submit contributions to the radio show via a form online. An audio CD containing the episodes between broadcast September 2005 and early 2006 went on sale on May 24, 2006.

The second Internet radio show, entitled Masumi Ryōko's Kashima Radio PC (真澄♥良子のかしましらじおPC, Masumi Ryōko no Kashima Radio PC), was also produced by Beat Net Radio, but was only available via podcasts on Bandai Visual Podcast. This show was one of only two radio programs ever distributed on Bandai Visual Podcast. The show was broadcast between December 22, 2005, and April 27, 2006, concluding with ten episodes, and was hosted by Masumi Asano and Ryōko Shintani; Asano voice Ayuki in the anime.

=== Books ===
A Kashimashi light novel, written by Mako Komao and illustrated by Yukimaru Katsura, was published by MediaWorks under their Dengeki Bunko imprint on January 10, 2006. The novel is told from a first person perspective alternating between Hazumu, Yasuna, and Tomari between chapters. There is a prologue, four chapters, and an epilogue in the novel; the prologue and the first chapter are told from Hazumu's perspective, then Yasuna's for chapter two, followed by Tomari's for chapter three, and finally back to Hazumu for chapter four and the epilogue. The last three pages of the book contain an afterword written by the author.

A 112-page artbook entitled Kashimashi Official Fan Book (かしまし公式ファンブック, Kashimashi Kōshiki Fan Bukku) was released by MediaWorks on March 27, 2006. The book, which is the same size as a manga bound volume, is printed in full-color for the first forty-eight pages which consists of a compilation of promotional art from the separate media types, character profiles with original sketches and comments on the characters, plus interviews from the voice actors of Hazumu, Yasuna, Tomari, Ayuki, and Jan Pu, and lastly original concept drawings of the school uniforms in the series. The middle of the book, which is printed in black-and-white, contains a brief overview of the first twenty-one chapters of the manga, and interviews from the manga author and illustrator, anime director and scenario writer, and the light novel author. There is also a brief explanation of the PlayStation 2 visual novel, of two figurines of Hazumu, and of three audio CDs for the anime version. The last sixteen pages are again in full-color and consist of the anime's first episode in manga format.

=== Anime ===
The anime series of Kashimashi was produced by Studio Hibari, directed by Nobuaki Nakanishi, and written by Jukki Hanada. The series aired on TV Tokyo in Japan from January 11 to March 29, 2006, ending with twelve regular episodes. The episodes were released on seven DVD compilations released between April 26 and October 27, 2006, each containing two episodes. An original video animation (OVA) episode was released with the final DVD which changed the ending from the original television broadcast. There was a small additional portion during the bra shopping scene in episode two that was considered adult enough to be censored out of the television broadcast, but which was included in the DVD release. Bandai Visual released a DVD box set of Kashimashi in Japan on June 25, 2010.

The anime series was licensed by Media Blasters in November 2006. The episodes were not dubbed into English, but still included subtitles in English. The first DVD went on sale on June 12, 2007, and contained the first five episodes. Extras on the disc included two ten-minute talks between the voice actresses for the three main female characters, a small collection of Japanese television advertisements, and textless opening videos. The second DVD went on sale on August 21, 2007, and the third and final DVD went on sale on October 23, 2007; the last two DVDs contain four episodes each, including the OVA episode. A box-set containing all three DVDs was released on October 14, 2008. The first episode of the series was included with the June 2007 issue of Newtype USA. A re-release titled Kashimashi: Girl Meet Girl Vocal Collection was released on April 26, 2011, with an English dub. After Media Blasters lost the rights, Discotek Media re-licensed the series.

=== Audio CDs ===
The anime opening theme, "Koisuru Kokoro" by Eufonius, and main ending theme, "Michishirube" by Yūmao, were both released on January 25, 2006, in Japan by Lantis. The anime used four alternate versions of the ending theme sung by four of the voice actors. In episode eight, it was sung by Masumi Asano, in episode nine by Kana Ueda as Hazumu, in episode ten by Yui Horie as Yasuna, and in episode eleven by Yukari Tamura as Tomari. The opening theme "Koisuru Kokoro" was used as the ending theme for the first episode while the song "Kimi no Tame ni Dekiru Koto" (キミのためにできること, lit. "Something I Can Do For You") by Yūmao was used as the ending theme in the twelfth episode.

Three insert songs sung by the voice actors were used in three of the episodes. In episode seven, the song "Hanaemi to Kasumisō" sung by Ueda was used, while in episode nine the song "Compass: Egao no Yukue" sung by Ueda, Horie, and Tamura was used; these two songs were from the "Compass: Egao no Yukue" image song single released on December 21, 2005. The last insert song, "Hanbun" (半分; lit. "Half") sung by Tamura, was used in episode twelve and was featured in the image song album Norte Amour released on April 5, 2006. The album also featured other songs by Ueda, Horie, Tamura, Asano, and Ryōko Shintani, who voiced Jan Pu. The Kashimashi Original Soundtrack for the anime version was released on April 26, 2006, by Lantis.

Finally, a drama CD based on the anime version was released on May 18, 2006, featuring ten voice actors from the anime. The plot for the drama CD takes place between final aired episode of the anime and the original video animation episode.

=== Visual novel ===
A visual novel video game based on the series named Kashimashi: Girl Meets Girl The First Summer Story (かしまし ～ガール・ミーツ・ガール～ 初めての夏物語, Kasimasi ~Gāru Mītsu Gāru~ Hajimete no Natsu Monogatari) was first released on the PlayStation 2 on March 30, 2006, in Japan. The game was developed by Vridge, published by Marvelous Interactive, and released in two editions, limited and regular, on the same day. The limited edition came in a specially made box with an original drama CD called "Kashimashi Triangle Letter", and a music CD featuring songs from the game in piano arrange versions. The game was later re-released in a Best Collection edition on November 16, 2006, which sold at less than half the price of the original game. Kashimashi: Girl Meets Girl The First Summer Story received a total review score of 26/40 (out of the four individual review scores of 7, 6, 7, and 6) from the Japanese gaming magazine Famitsu.

The game's story begins on the outset of summer vacation. Hazumu's homeroom teacher Namiko Tsuki suggests Hazumu and her friends take a one-week trip to a small mountain village with a hot spring resort. Hazumu's grandparents reside in this town, and are two new characters introduced to the story. Three other female characters are introduced as possible love interests for Hazumu; two are the same age as her, and the third is the older landlady of the resort. The goal of the game is to pair Hazumu up with one of the five female cast of characters. The gameplay's main system comes from Hazumu's indecisive personality. If the player shows more interest in a particular character, the other characters get annoyed that Hazumu is ignoring them, which is displayed in a tension meter. The more Hazumu ignores a particular character, the higher the tension between that character becomes. This ensures Hazumu stays good friends with the possible love interests. In order to view the ending of a particular character, a certain amount of tension will have to be between the other characters, but this cannot be too great or the ending will not show.

The gameplay requires little interaction from the player as most of the duration of the game is spent simply reading the text that appears on the game screen which represents either dialogue between the various characters or the inner thoughts of the protagonist. An important aspect of the game (as in nearly every visual novel) are the "decision points" which appear every so often which give the player the chance to choose from a limited number of options. The time between these decision points is variable and can occur anywhere from a minute to much longer. The game pauses at such moments and depending on which choice the player makes, the plot will progress in a specific direction. Each plot line can be achieved through multiple replays.

== Reception ==
=== Manga ===
In July 2007, the English version of Kashimashi was Seven Seas Entertainment's best-selling title. The first volume of the manga was given positive reviews from such sources as Newtype USA, a popular anime and manga magazine. The first volume was named as Newtype USA's Book of the Month for December 2006, and the review noted Seven Seas Entertainment's "fan-focused" translation, which retained the honorifics and much of the Japanese wordplay without efforts to localize the humor for the mainstream American market. The review goes on to state that "for fans of more mainstream romantic productions, it's a neat twist on the traditional love-triangle formula, and a charming alternative to boys meeting girls." In a review at Anime News Network (ANN), Carlo Santos commented that "the fast-moving events of this first volume combine to form a story of many moods: a gender-bending comedy, but with sci-fi touches, and most of all, a romance more touching than one might expect. The time has come to rethink the love triangle." In a review at IGN, A. E. Sparrow stated "there's plenty to enjoy in the first book, however. Hazumu attempting to buy his first bra is pretty humorous, as are the occasional visits from the aliens who put him in this situation in the first place."

The second volume of the manga was positively reviewed at Anime News Network by Theron Martin, who wrote: "With its second volume the title pushes fully into the realm of romantic comedy, liberally sprinkling its story with humorous asides, pratfalls, and anecdotes while still dealing head-on with the much more serious and involved love triangle springing up around Hazumu. For all its attempts to be funny, though, it is the story's more dramatic side that will keep you coming back." In ANN's review of manga volume three, Theron Martin wrote, "The artistry of Yukimaru Katsura rarely devotes more effort to backgrounds than necessary, but its strength has always lain in the character designs and costuming. The array of the female cast provides a great contrast of looks [but] ... the male characters, though easily distinguishable, stand out less." In ANN's double review of manga volumes four and five, Martin commented, "these volumes offer a solid conclusion to this lovely little yuri series. It does handle things rather differently than in the anime version, and those irritated by the anime's ending should find this one more to their liking."

The first manga volume was generally panned by Deb Aoki at About.com where she felt the characters were "too flat and uninteresting", and the story being "too far-fetched" and "ridiculous" to make a good story. However, Aoki admitted the art is "quite nice, and there are some moments of genuine tenderness and humor". In a review of the first manga volume by Matthew Alexander at Mania.com, he thought that while "stories with love triangles or gender-switching protagonists have been done before ... Hazumu's change into a girl explores romance between people of the same sex in an interesting and comedic way."

=== Anime ===
The anime series has been compared with a similar series that involved gender swapping—Rumiko Takahashi's Ranma ½. In a review on THEM Anime Reviews, the Stig Høgset wrote that the anime can be "aggravating to watch at times", but can still raise smiles, as the characters make the show believable, calling the show "down to earth and pleasant to look at, if nothing else", reinforced by a detailed art style and "generally great animation quality". The conclusion of the anime was positively reviewed by Erica Friedman, who is the president of Yuricon, an anime convention geared towards fans of yuri anime and manga, and ALC Publishing, a publishing house dedicated to yuri. Friedman described the anime's conclusion as "so normal - so much like a thing that might have actually happened in real life ... that it kind of just went under the radar." Carl Kimlinger of Anime News Network said that unlike Kannazuki no Miko, the series does not "emotionally overwhelm its audience" but is a "gently emotional romantic comedy" instead, with the secret of "Hazumu's sex-change" told to the entire world, and said that the juggling of different viewpoints from the character makes you "sympathize strongly with each one". Kimlinger also praised the "effortlessly evocative visuals and ... understated score," said that the series has an eye for the "dramatic potential of its gender-switching premise", called the backgrounds are "softly evocative", and praised the series as a "gentle romantic comedy" while calling the humor in the series forced and "intrusive".

The three DVD volumes released by Media Blasters were reviewed by Anime News Network. In the review of the first DVD, the reviewer commented, that the series "skillfully juggled" the character's different viewpoints, drawing in viewers with "soft, effortlessly evocative visuals", relying on facial expressions which subtly shifted in order to communicate the emotional states of the characters. For the second DVD volume, Theron Martin said that the artistic style and colors used, it contributes to "the look and feel of the original story", with the anime duplicate many scenes from the original manga and it does everything to stay true to "the original writing". Finally, for the third volume, Carl Kimlinger wrote that the writers made an ill-advised attempt to remove the "bitter" from "bittersweet" by tacking on plot developments which are unconvincing in the OVA, but that it ultimately has a "deeply satisfying conclusion".

The three DVD volumes released by Media Blasters were also reviewed by Mania.com. In the review of the first DVD, the reviewer Chris Beveridge described the anime as "something different from the norm" which "mixes romance and comedy quite well". However, the pacing early on is felt as being "awkward" which "takes time to really find its rhythm". For the second DVD volume, Beveridge commented that "the mixing of the relationships continues to be the most interesting part of the show". Beveridge goes on to state "the mild moments of it are tacky and bad", but "when it comes to the core cast of characters, it's all solid material that is very enjoyable." Finally, for the third volume, Beveridge wrote that "despite the issues with how the series turns in the bonus OVA episode, Kashimashi has proven to be quite a lot of fun for the situations it presented." The series is seen to "close out rather well", and "not only is it good fun but it's also an enjoyable romantic show with lots of heart and emotion."
