= Yūmao =

Japanese singer

Yūmao (ゆうまお; born on February 11, 1980), also known as Mayuko, is a female Japanese singer-songwriter from Tokyo, Japan.

== Education ==
Yūmao is a graduate of Kunitachi College of Music.

== Career ==
Yūmao sometimes performs as an indie singer under the stage name Mayuko. Her music is produced by FlagShip and Lantis.

Yūmao is a pseudonym that she assumed in late 2002, which she uses primarily when writing and composing songs for anime and games such as Galaxy Angel and D.C.: Da Capo, as well as voice actresses such as Mai Nakahara and Ryoko Shintani. The name originated from yūmaō (優魔王), which in turn was formed from yasashii maō (優しい魔王; lit. kind devil); the long "o" sound at the end was dropped due to excessiveness.

Yūmao's two singles, "Michishirube" and "Sweet Home Song," have both been ending themes for the anime Kashimashi: Girl Meets Girl and Asatte no Houkou respectively. Additionally, her song "Kimi no Tame ni Dekiru Koto" was played in episode twelve of Kashimashi and her song "Omoide ga Hoshikatta" was released on the Please Twins! vocal album Esquisse.

== Discography ==
=== Yūmao ===
==== Singles ====
- Michishirube, released January 25, 2006
  1. "Michishirube" (みちしるべ, lit. Route Marker)
  2. "Song Rider" (ソングライダー, Songu Raidā)
  3. "Michishirube" (Hikigatari) (みちしるべ（弾き語り）)
  4. "Michishirube" (instrumental) (みちしるべ（インスト）)
  5. "Song Rider" (instrumental) (ソングライダー（インスト）)
- Sweet Home Song, released November 8, 2006
  1. "Sweet Home Song" (スイートホームソング, Suīto Hōmu Songu)
  2. "Mr. Lonely Girl" (Mr.ロンリーガール)
  3. "Sweet Home Song" (instrumental) (スイートホームソング（インスト）)
  4. "Mr. Lonely Girl" (instrumental) (Mr.ロンリーガール（インスト）)
- Clubhouse Sandwich, released November 7, 2007
  1. "Clubhouse Sandwich" (クラブハウスセンド)
  2. "Ginger Ale" (ジンジャーエール)
  3. "Clubhouse Sandwich" (OFF-VOCAL) (クラブハウスセンド（OFF-VOCAL）)
  4. "Ginger Ale" (OFF-VOCAL) (ジンジャーエール（OFF-VOCAL）)

==== Albums ====
key, released July 5, 2006

1. "key"
2. "Michishirube" (みちしるべ)
3. "Compass ~egao no yukue~" (コンパス～笑顔の行方～)
4. "Kimi no Moto e" (君のもとへ)
5. "TAKE OUT!!"
6. "Song Rider" (ソングライダー, Songu Raidā)
7. "Mug Cup" (マグカップ, Magukappu)
8. "Un" (うん)
9. "Omoide ga Hoshikatta" (思い出が欲しかった)
10. "Kimi no Tame ni Dekiru Koto" (キミのためにできること, lit. Something I Can Do For You)
11. "Kenban yori Ai o Komete" (鍵盤より愛をこめて)

someday, released February 14, 2008

1. クラブハウスサンド
2. Mr.ロンリーガール
3. 答案用紙
4. ジンジャーエール
5. ノウティス
6. 蒼空にくちづけたら
7. Black cat on the piano
8. 戻れない証拠
9. スイートホームソング
10. a direction of the day after tomorrow
11. someday
12. fine

=== Mayuko ===
==== Albums ====
- Aozora, released July 7, 2005
- Akatsuki, released February 11, 2007
