= Yuri Shimai =

Japanese manga magazine

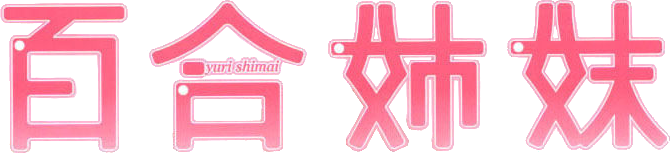

- Autumn 2004 issue.
- Categories: Yuri manga
- Frequency: Quarterly
- First issue: 28 June 2003
- Final issue Number: 17 November 2004; 5
- Company: Sun Magazine
- Country: Japan
- Language: Japanese

Yuri Shimai (百合姉妹; lit. Lily Sisters) was a yuri manga anthology magazine published quarterly by Japanese publisher Sun Magazine.The magazine existed between June 2003 and November 2004. It was part of what still is a small niche market, with only a few manga magazines in Japan that specializes in the yuri (i.e. lesbian-themed) genre. The magazine also contained one-shots and light novels. The magazine was discontinued in November 2004 with the fifth volume. The magazine's cover illustrations were done by Reine Hibiki, the illustrator of the yuri light novel series Maria-sama ga Miteru.

The magazine was revived as Comic Yuri Hime by Ichijinsha in July 2005, with many of the same manga authors returning.

== Issues ==
Volume 1 (June 28, 2003, ¥880)

- Under the Rose by Kita Konno
- Her by Taishi Zaō
- Even if We're Not Friends by Milk Morinaga
- Strawberry Shake (chapter one) by Shizuru Hayashiya
- Pure Shadow by Kahori Onozucca
- Pops by Shinkai Inoue
- Natsu no Mayu by Mako Takahashi
- Kamuko by Inuburo
- Little Birds of Paradise by Sakura Sakazaki
- Melancholy of a Selfish Princess by Satsuki Miyu (art by Aruma Jirou)
- Koi Shimai (first short story) by Akinaru Ikemoto (art by Reine Hibiki)

Volume 2 (November 28, 2003, ¥880)

- A Kiss, Love, and a Prince by Milk Morinaga
- Angels' Wings by Akiko Morishima
- Your Color by Kanako Meizi
- Sound by Kanan Yamada
- The Two of Us by Hashiba Hayase
- Expressions of Love by Eiki Eiki (art by Taishi Zaō)
- Strawberry Shake (chapter two) by Shizuru Hayashiya
- Nowhere to Go by Kita Konno
- Maze of Flowers by Poteto Outsuka
- Hansel, Gretel, and the Witch by Ruri Hozuki (art by Shio Sakura)
- Koi Shimai (second short story) by Akinaru Ikemoto (art by Reine Hibiki)

Volume 3 (April 27, 2004, ¥880)

- Like a Flower by Sakura Sakazaki
- Strawberry Shake (chapter three) by Shizuru Hayashiya
- A Little Melody of Love by Kaname Uchimura
- This Love From I Can't Remember When by Milk Morinaga
- Pops 2nd by Shinkai Inoue
- Cherish by Poteto Outsuka
- In The Afternoon by Kita Konno
- 24, 25 by Samato Techno
- The She-Wolf and the Seven Kids by Ruri Hozuki (art by Shio Sakura)
- Koi Shimai (third short story) by Akinaru Ikemoto (art by Reine Hibiki)

Volume 4 (July 27, 2004, ¥880)

- Strawberry Shake (chapter four) by Shizuru Hayashiya
- Sandals by Mako Takahashi
- She-Wolf by Eiki Eiki (art by Taishi Zaō)
- Swear by Moony Muttri (based on the visual novel Akai Ito)
- Wishing on a Star by Souya Himawari
- The Summer Closest to Heaven by Milk Morinaga
- Sapphism no Gensou by Sora Meteo, illustrated by Keito Koume (based on the visual novel of the same name)
- The Little Mermaid by Ruri Hozuki (art by Shio Sakura)
- A Visitor on a Moonlit Night by Kaya Kuramoto
- Torikago no Miko to Kimagure na Majo (chapter one) by Miyabi Fujieda
- Koi Shimai (manga chapter one) by Mizuo Shinomine

Volume 5 (November 17, 2004, ¥880)

- First Bloom by Chi-Ran
- Strawberry Shake (chapter five) by Shizuru Hayashiya
- Real Love by Milk Morinaga
- Whispers Under the Roses by Aya Sakurai
- Testify by Karyu
- Spirals of Pleasure by Yuu Izumi
- First Kiss (part A) by Eiki Eiki (art by Taishi Zaō)
- Red Umbrella, White Umbrella by Mako Takahashi
- Torikago no Miko to Kimagure na Majo (chapter two) by Miyabi Fujieda
- Princess Kaguya by Ruri Hozuki (art by Shio Sakura)
- Koi Shimai (manga chapter two) by Mizuo Shinomine
- Voice (chapter one) by Nawoko
