= Cospa =

Japanese clothing company

Cospa, Inc. 株式会社コスパ
- Type: Clothing manufacturer
- Industry: Clothing
- Founded: May 1995
- Headquarters: Tokyo Prefecture, Shibuya, Japan
- Website: cospa.com

Cospa (コスパ, Kosupa) is a Japanese clothing company specializing in the production of cosplay costumes and other apparel for the otaku fan base. The company started in May 1995 as the child company of Broccoli. The name "Cospa" comes from an acronym for "Contents Communication Service Partner (コンテンツ・コミュニケーション・パートナー, Kontentsu Komyunikēshon Pātonā).
