= Yukimaru Katsura =

Japanese manga artist

Yukimaru Katsura (桂 遊生丸, Katsura Yukimaru; born February 17) is a Japanese manga artist. Most of her works are based on stories from other media, notably video games. She usually draws girls round-faced, and tends to use warm color tones.

== Works ==
- Air
- Ark (based on the song of the same name by the Japanese band Sound Horizon)
- Kashimashi: Girl Meets Girl
- Love Allergen
- Magical Play
- Roman (based on an album by Sound Horizon)
- Yumeria
