= Yuri (genre) =

Fiction genre depicting female same-sex relationships

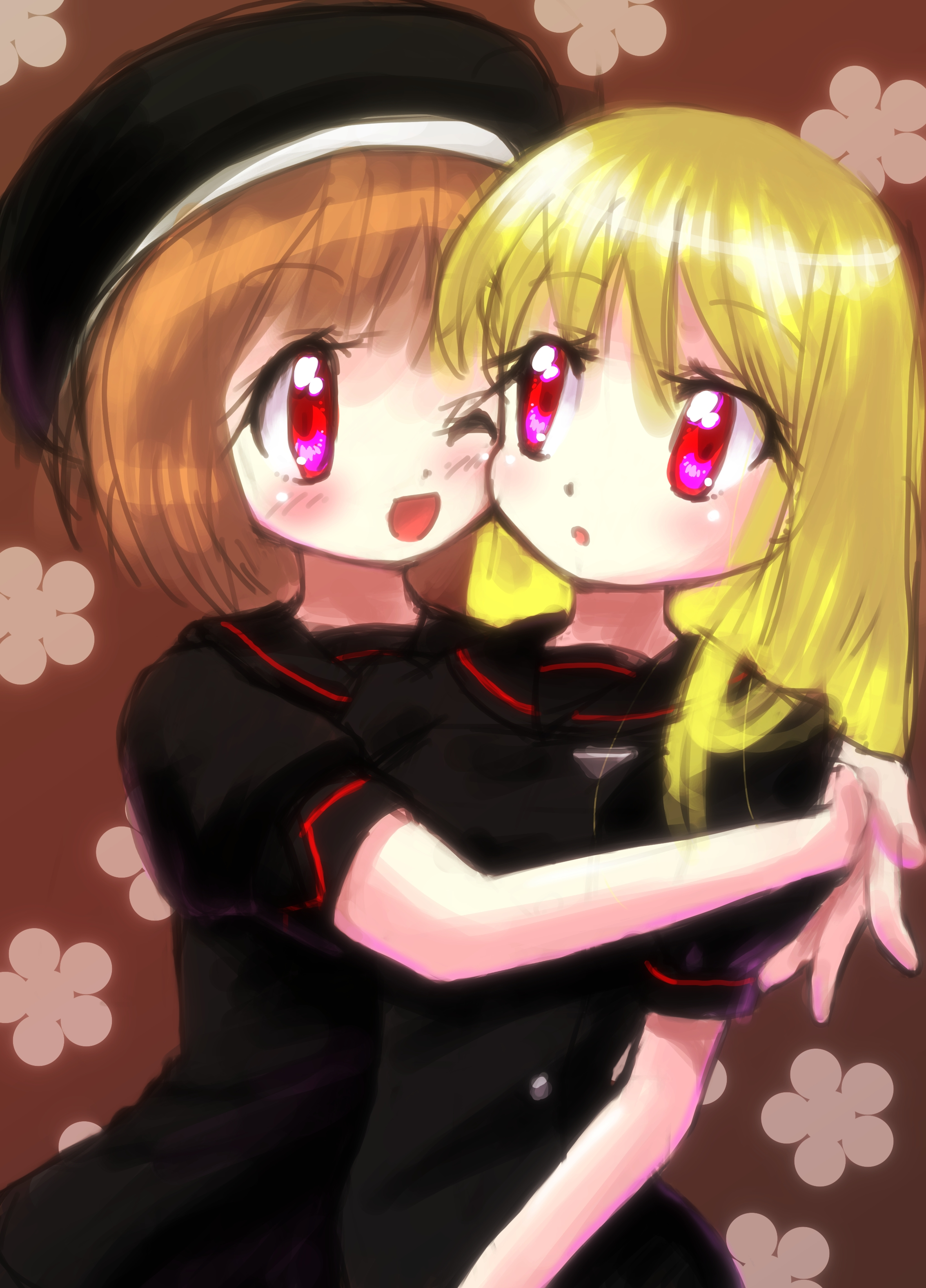
An example of yuri-inspired artwork. Works depicting intimate relationships between school classmates are common in the yuri genre.

Yuri (Japanese: 百合; lit. "lily"), also known by the wasei-eigo construction girls' love (ガールズラブ, gāruzu rabu), is a genre of Japanese media focusing on intimate relationships between female characters. While lesbian relationships are a commonly associated theme, the genre is also inclusive of works depicting emotional and spiritual relationships between women that are not necessarily romantic or sexual in nature. Yuri is most commonly associated with anime and manga, though the term has also been used to describe video games, light novels, and other forms of literature.

Themes associated with yuri originate from Japanese lesbian fiction of the early twentieth century, notably the writings of Nobuko Yoshiya and literature in the Class S genre. Manga depicting female homoeroticism began to appear in the 1970s in the works of artists associated with the Year 24 Group, notably Ryoko Yamagishi and Riyoko Ikeda. The genre gained wider popularity beginning in the 1990s. The founding of Yuri Shimai in 2003 as the first manga magazine devoted exclusively to yuri, followed by its successor Comic Yuri Hime in 2005, led to the establishment of yuri as a discrete publishing genre and the creation of a yuri fan culture.

As a genre, yuri does not inherently target a single gender demographic, unlike its male homoerotic counterparts boys' love (BL, marketed towards a female audience) and gay manga (marketed towards a gay male audience). Although yuri originated as a genre targeted towards a female audience, yuri works have been produced that target a male audience, as in manga from Comic Yuri Hime's male-targeted sister magazine Comic Yuri Hime S.

== Terminology and etymology ==
=== Yuri ===
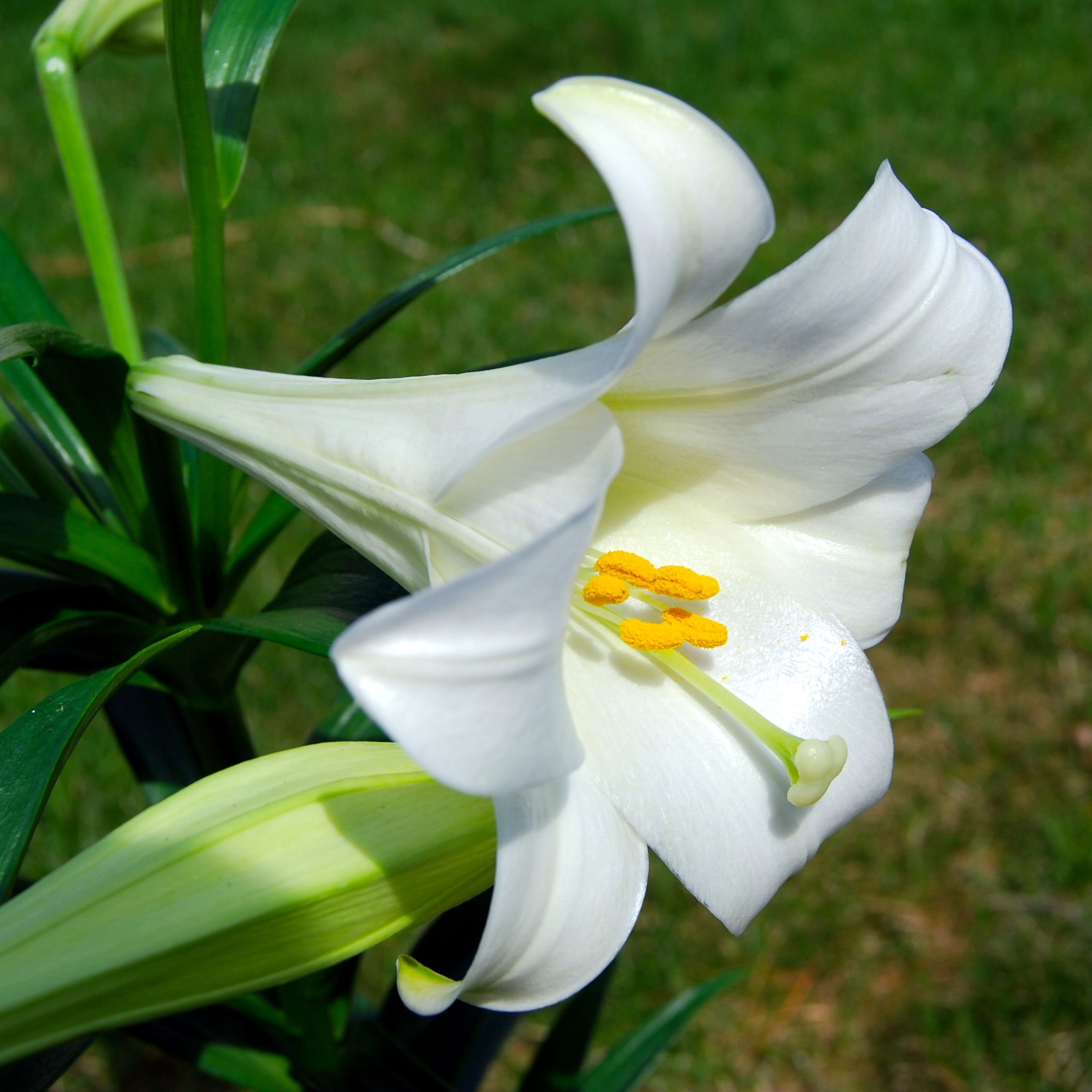
A white lily; the de facto symbol of the yuri genre

The word yuri (百合) translates literally to "lily", and is a relatively common Japanese feminine name. White lilies have been used since the Romantic era of Japanese literature to symbolize beauty and purity in women, and are a de facto symbol of the yuri genre.

In 1976, Ito Bungaku, editor of the gay men's magazine Barazoku (薔薇族; lit. "Rose Tribe"), used the term yurizoku (百合族; lit. "lily tribe") in reference to female readers of the magazine in a column of letters titled Yurizoku no Heya (百合族の部屋; lit. "Lily Tribe's Room"). While not all women whose letters appeared in Yurizoku no Heya were lesbians, and it is unclear whether the column was the first instance of the term yuri in this context, an association of yuri with lesbianism subsequently developed. For example, the male–male romance magazine Allan began publishing Yuri Tsūshin (百合通信, "Lily Communication") in July 1983 as a personal ad column for "lesbiennes" to communicate.

The term came to be associated with lesbian pornographic manga beginning in the 1990s, notably through the manga magazine Lady's Comic Misuto (1996–1999), which heavily featured symbolic lily flowers. When the term yuri began being used in the West in the 1990s, it was similarly used almost exclusively to describe pornographic manga aimed at male readers featuring lesbian couples. Over time, the term drifted from this pornographic connotation to describe the portrayal of intimate love, sex, or emotional connections between women, and became broadly recognized as a genre name for works depicting same-sex female intimacy in the mid-2000s following the founding of the specialized yuri manga magazines Yuri Shimai and Comic Yurihime. The Western use of yuri subsequently broadened beginning in the 2000s, picking up connotations from the Japanese use. American publishing companies such as ALC Publishing and Seven Seas Entertainment have also adopted the Japanese usage of the term to classify their yuri manga publications.

In Korea and China, "lily" is used as a semantic loan from the Japanese usage to describe female–female romance media, where each use the direct translation of the term: baekhap (백합) in Korea, and bǎihé (百合) in China.

=== Girls' love ===
The wasei-eigo construction "girls' love" (ガールズラブ, gāruzu rabu) and its abbreviation "GL" were adopted by Japanese publishers in the 2000s, likely as an antonym of the male–male romance genre boys' love (BL). While the term is generally considered synonymous with yuri, in rare cases it is used to denote yuri media that is sexually explicit, following the publication of the erotic yuri manga anthology Girls Love by Ichijinsha in 2011. However, this distinction is infrequently made, and yuri and "girls' love" are almost always used interchangeably.

=== Shōjo-ai ===
In the 1990s, Western fans began to use the term shōjo-ai (少女愛; lit. "girl love") to describe yuri works that do not depict explicit sex. Its usage was modeled after the Western appropriation of the term shōnen-ai (少年愛; lit. "boy love") to describe BL works that do not feature sexually explicit content. In Japan, the term shōjo-ai is not used with this meaning, and instead denotes pedophilic relationships between adult men and girls.

== History ==
=== Before 1970: Class S literature ===
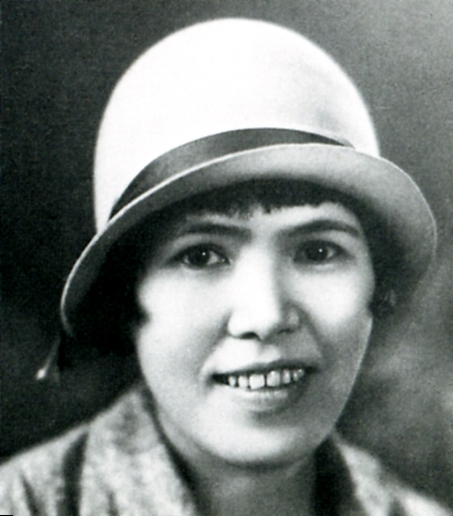
Writer Nobuko Yoshiya, whose works in the Class S genre significantly influenced yuri

Among the first Japanese authors to produce works about love between women was Nobuko Yoshiya, a novelist active in the Taishō and Shōwa periods. Yoshiya was a pioneer in Japanese lesbian literature, including the early twentieth century Class S genre. Her works popularized many of the ideas and tropes which drove the yuri genre for years to come. Class S stories depict lesbian attachments as emotionally intense yet platonic relationships, destined to be curtailed by graduation from school, marriage, or death. The root of this genre is in part the contemporary belief that same-sex love was a transitory and normal part of female development leading into heterosexuality and motherhood. Class S developed in the 1930s through Japanese girls' magazines, but declined as a result of state censorship brought about by the Second Sino–Japanese War in 1937. Though homosociality between girls would re-emerge as a common theme in post-war shōjo manga (comics for girls), Class S gradually declined in popularity in favor of works focused on male–female romances.

Traditionally, Class S stories focus on strong emotional bonds between an upperclassman and an underclassman, or in rare cases, between a student and her teacher. Private all-girls schools are a common setting for Class S stories, which are depicted as an idyllic homosocial world reserved for women. Works in the genre focus heavily on the beauty and innocence of their protagonists, a theme that would recur in yuri. Critics have alternately considered Class S as a distinct genre from yuri, as a "proto-yuri", and a component of yuri.

=== 1970s and 1980s: The "dark age" ===
In 1970, manga artist Masako Yashiro published the shōjo manga Shīkuretto Rabu (シークレットラブ; "Secret Love"), which focuses on a love triangle between two girls and a boy. Noted as the first non-Class S manga to depict an intimate relationship between women, Shīkuretto Rabu is regarded by some scholars as the first work in the yuri genre. As both Yashiro and Shīkuretto Rabu are relatively obscure and the work focuses in part on male–female romance, most critics identify Shiroi Heya no Futari by Ryōko Yamagishi, published in 1971, as the first yuri manga. The 1970s also saw shōjo manga that dealt with transgender characters and characters who blur gender distinctions through cross-dressing, which was inspired in part by the Takarazuka Revue, an all-female theater troupe where women play male roles. These traits are most prominent in Riyoko Ikeda's works, including The Rose of Versailles (1972–1973), Dear Brother (1975), and Claudine (1978). Some shōnen works of this period featured lesbian characters, though they were typically depicted as fanservice and comic relief.

Roughly a dozen yuri manga were published from the 1970s to the early 1990s, with the majority being published in the 1970s. Most of these stories are tragedies, focused on doomed relationships that end in separation or death. Owing to the small number of works published during this period and their generally tragic focus, Yuri Shimai has referred to the 1970s and 1980s as the "dark age" of yuri. Several theories have emerged to explain the bias towards tragic narratives present in this period. Writer and translator Frederik L. Schodt notes that the majority of shōjo manga published during this period were tragic, regardless of whether or not they were yuri. James Welker of Kanagawa University argues that these narratives represent a form of "lesbian panic", where the character—and by extension, the author—refuses their own lesbian feelings and desires. Verena Maser suggests that the decline of Class S removed the only context in which intimate relationships between women were possible, while Yukari Fujimoto suggests that patriarchal forces were responsible for tragic endings in these stories.

=== 1990s: Mainstream popularity ===
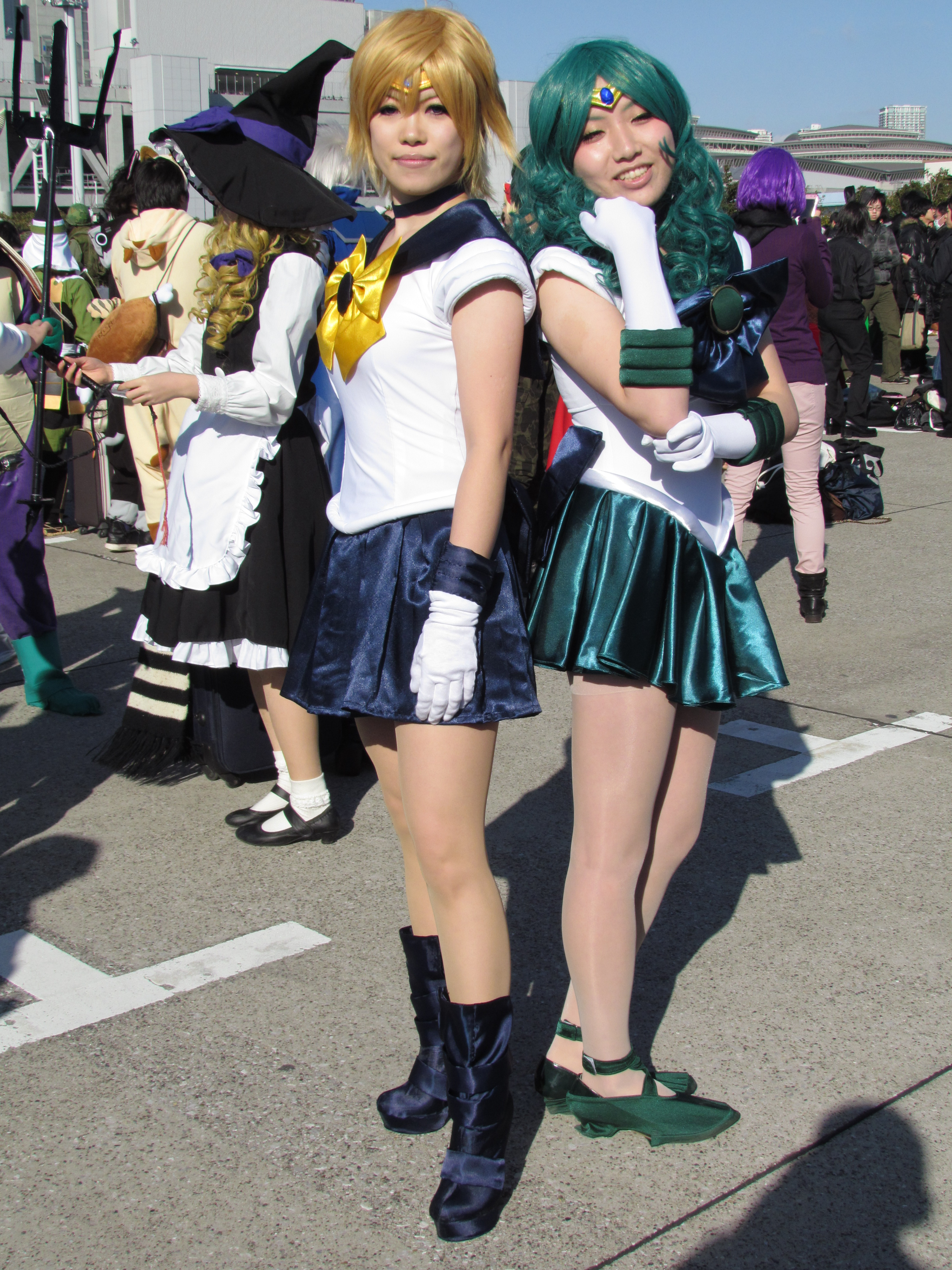
Cosplayers dressed as Sailor Uranus and Sailor Neptune from Sailor Moon

By the 1990s, tragic story formulas in manga had declined in popularity. 1992 saw the release of two major works for the development of yuri: Jukkai me no Jukkai (1992) by Wakuni Akisato, which began to move the genre away from tragic outcomes and stereotyped dynamics; and the anime adaptation of Sailor Moon (1991–1997) by Naoko Takeuchi, the first mainstream manga and anime series to feature a "positive" portrayal of a lesbian relationship in the coupling of Sailor Uranus and Sailor Neptune. The immense popularity of Sailor Moon allowed the series to be adapted into anime, films, and to be exported internationally, significantly influencing the shōjo and yuri genres. Uranus and Neptune became popular subjects of dōjinshi (self-published manga, analogous to fan comics) and contributed to the development of yuri dōjinshi culture.

The success of Sailor Moon significantly influenced the development of yuri, and by the mid-1990s, anime, and manga featuring intimate relationships between women enjoyed mainstream success and popularity. Sailor Moon director Kunihiko Ikuhara went on to create Revolutionary Girl Utena (1997–1999), a shōjo anime series with female same-sex relationships as a central focus. This period also saw a revival of the Class S genre through the bestselling light novel series Maria-sama ga Miteru (1998–2012) by Oyuki Konno, which by 2010 had 5.4 million copies in print. Another prominent author of this period is Kaho Nakayama, active since the early 1990s, with works involving love stories among women. The first Japanese magazines specifically targeted towards lesbians, many of which contained sections featuring yuri manga, also emerged during this period. Stories in these magazines ranged from high school romance to lesbian life and love and featured varying degrees of sexual content.

=== 2000s: Publishing and fan culture growth ===
Faced with a proliferation of stories focused on homosociality, homoeroticism, and female homosexuality, some publishers sought to exploit the yuri market by creating manga magazines dedicated to the genre, coalescing around yuri as the preferred name for this genre in response to its popularity in dōjinshi culture. In 2003, Yuri Tengoku and Yuri Shimai launched as the first manga magazines devoted exclusively to yuri. This was followed by the female-oriented Comic Yuri Hime in 2005 and the male-oriented Comic Yuri Hime S in 2007; the two magazines merged under the title Comic Yuri Hime in 2010.

Stories in these magazines dealt with a range of themes, from intense emotional connections such as those depicted in Voiceful (2004–2006), to sexually explicit schoolgirl romances like those portrayed in First Love Sisters (2003–2008), and realistic tales about love between adult women such as those seen in The Conditions of Paradise (2007). Some of these subjects are seen in male-targeted works of this period as well, sometimes in combination with other themes, including mecha and science fiction. Examples include series such as Kannazuki no Miko (2004–2005), Blue Drop (2004–2008), and Kashimashi: Girl Meets Girl (2004–2007). In addition, male-targeted stories tend to make extensive use of moe and bishōjo characterizations.

The publication of yuri magazines had the effect of nurturing a "yuri culture" that influenced artists to create works depicting female same-sex relationships. Further, articles in these magazines contributed to the history of the genre by retroactively labeling certain works as yuri, thus developing "a historical canon of the yuri genre." Specifically, Verena Maser notes in her analysis of issues of Yuri Shimai, Comic Yurihime, and Comic Yurihime S published from 2003 to 2012 that eight of the ten most-referenced series in the magazines predate the 2003 formalization of yuri as a publishing genre: Apurōzu - Kassai (1981–1985), Sakura no Sono (1985–1986), Sailor Moon (1992–1996), Cardcaptor Sakura (1996–2000), Revolutionary Girl Utena (1997–1999), Maria-sama ga Miteru (1998–2012), Loveless (2002–present), and Strawberry Marshmallow (2002–present).

=== 2010s–present: Genre diversification ===
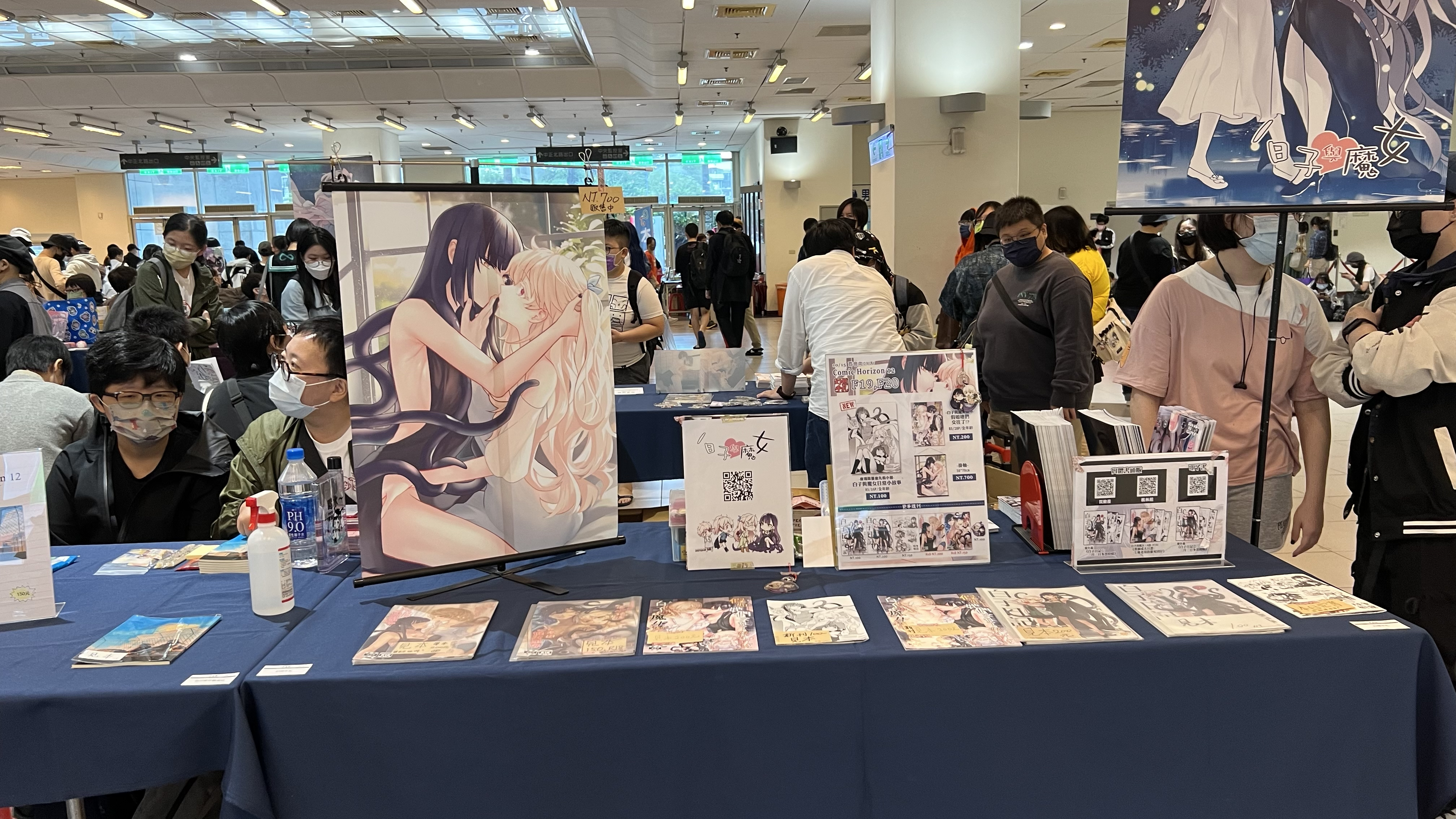
Yuri doujinshi being sold at a doujinshi convention in 2022

While schoolgirl romances remained popular into the 2010s and 2020s, notably Kase-san (2010–2017), Citrus (2012–2018), Bloom Into You (2015–2019), Whisper Me a Love Song (2019–present), and There's No Freaking Way I'll be Your Lover! Unless... (2020–present), yuri works during this period began to incorporate new genres, themes, and subject material. The mid-2010s saw yuri works expand to genres such as science fiction and isekai, as well as the formalization of shakaijin yuri (社会人百合; lit. "member of society yuri") as a subgenre focused on stories involving adult women.

The growth of digital platforms like Pixiv, Twitter, and Shōsetsuka ni Narō allowed for the creation and widespread distribution of yuri works outside of traditional manga magazine and dōjinshi publishing: My Lesbian Experience With Loneliness (2016) was originally published as a web comic, while the yuri fantasy works Sexiled (2018–2019), Roll Over and Die (2018–present), and I'm in Love with the Villainess (2018–present) began as web novels on Shōsetsuka ni Narō before being adapted into other mediums. Yuri stories by openly lesbian creators also became more prominent, such as My Lesbian Experience With Loneliness. The genre of comic essays—stories that focus on the author's life experiences—have also become popular, including the aforementioned My Lesbian Experience with Loneliness and Hiranishi Mieri's The Moment I Realized I Wasn't Straight.

== Concepts and themes ==
=== Intimacy between women ===
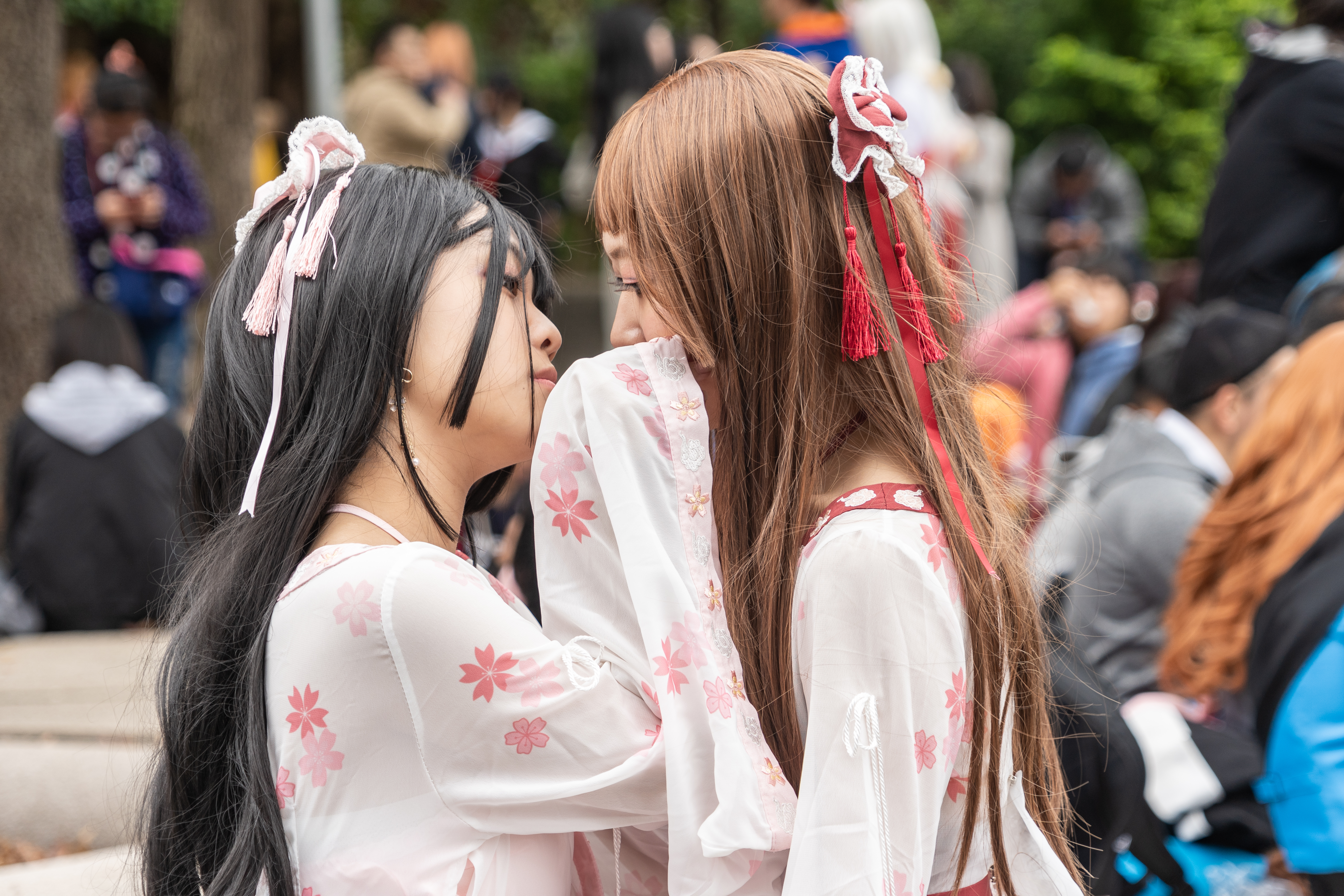
A pair of cosplayers portraying a yuri scenario

Yuri as a genre depicts intimate relationships between women, a scope that is broadly defined to include romantic love, intense friendships, spiritual love, and rivalry. While lesbianism is a theme commonly associated with yuri, not all characters in yuri media are necessarily non-heterosexual; Welker states that the question whether yuri characters are lesbians is a "very complicated issue." Characters in yuri works frequently do not define their sexual orientation in explicit terms, and the matter is instead left to reader interpretation.

Rica Takashima notes Western and Japanese fans often have differing expectations for the level of intimacy depicted in yuri, which she ascribes to cultural differences between the groups. She notes that yuri works that enjoy international popularity tend to be explicit and focused on "cute girls making out with each other," while Japanese fans "have a propensity for reading between the lines, picking up on subtle cues, and using their own imaginations to weave rich tapestries of meaning from small threads."

=== Lack of genre and demographic exclusivity ===
Though yuri has been historically and thematically linked to shōjo manga since its emergence in the 1970s, yuri works have been published in all demographic groups for manga, not only shōjo (girls), but also josei (adult women), shōnen (boys) and seinen (adult men). Shōjo yuri works tend to focus on fanciful and fairy tale-inspired narratives that idolize Takarazuka Revue-inspired "girl prince" characters, while yuri works in the josei demographic tend to depict same-sex female couples with a greater degree of realism. Conversely, shōnen and seinen manga tend to use yuri to depict relationships between "innocent schoolgirls" and "predatory lesbians". Manga magazines dedicated exclusively to yuri tend not to conform to any one specific demographic, and are thus inclusive of content ranging from schoolgirl romances to sexually explicit content.

Often, works that are perceived and categorized as yuri in Japan are not regarded as such by international audiences. For example, while in the West Sailor Moon is regarded as a magical girl series with some yuri elements, in Japan the series is regarded by yuri magazines as a "monumental work" of the genre. The Sailor Moon example further illustrates how fans, rather than publishers or creators, often determine whether a work is yuri; Sailor Moon was not conceived as a yuri manga or anime, but "became a yuri text" based on how the work was interpreted and consumed by yuri fans.

=== Nominal sexual content ===
Yuri works generally do not depict graphic sex scenes. Unlike boys' love and yaoi, where explicit depictions of sexual acts are commonplace and stories typically climax with the central couple engaging in anal intercourse, sexual acts in yuri are rarely more explicit than kissing and the caressing of breasts. Kazumi Nagaike of Oita University argues that this general avoidance of sex "does not mean that female sexual desire is effaced" in yuri, but rather that the absence of sex "clearly derives from the importance which is placed on the spiritual female–female bond." Yuri media that contains only suggestive or teasing sexual content is sometimes called ecchi yuri.

=== "Crimson Rose and Candy Girl" ===
The majority of yuri stories published in the 1970s and 1980s were tragedies, focused on doomed relationships that end in separation or death (see History above). Yukari Fujimoto, a manga scholar at Meiji University, notes that the tragic plot of Shiroi Heya no Futari became a common yuri story archetype that she dubs "Crimson Rose and Candy Girl". These stories depict "Candy", a physically smaller character with lighter hair and a naive personality, who admires "Rose", a generally taller character with long dark hair and a serious demeanor. The characters bond over a common unhappiness, usually originating from their respective home lives. The attachment between Candy and Rose becomes the subject of rumors or even blackmail while Candy and Rose grow to acknowledge that their relationship has become romantic. The story concludes with Rose dying in order to protect Candy from scandal. While tragic story formulas in yuri declined in popularity by the 1990s, the Rose and Candy archetypes continue to influence contemporary yuri stories, particularly those that depict senpai and kōhai relationships such as Bloom Into You.

=== Tachi and neko ===
In Japanese lesbian culture, the participants in a lesbian relationship are occasionally referred to as tachi (タチ; lit. "top", as derived from tachiyaku, the male role in kabuki), which designates the active participant, and neko (ネコ; lit. "cat"), which designates the submissive participant. This distinction is comparable to that of the seme and uke distinction in BL, or to the butch and femme distinction in general lesbian culture. Characters in contemporary yuri rarely conform to these dichotomies, though the dynamic of an active partner and a passive partner that the tachi and neko distinction represents does recur in the genre.

== Media ==
=== In Japan ===
In the mid-1990s and early 2000s, some Japanese lesbian lifestyle magazines contained manga sections, including the now-defunct magazines Anise (1996–1997, 2001–2003) and Phryné (1995). Carmilla, an erotic lesbian publication, released an anthology of lesbian manga called Girl's Only. Additionally, Mist (1996–1999), a ladies' comic manga magazine, contained sexually explicit lesbian-themed manga as part of a section dedicated to lesbian-interest topics.

The first publication marketed exclusively as yuri was Sun Magazine's manga anthology magazine Yuri Shimai, which was released between June 2003 and November 2004 in quarterly installments, ending with only five issues. After the magazine's discontinuation, Comic Yuri Hime was launched by Ichijinsha in July 2005 as a revival of the magazine, containing manga by many of the authors who had had work serialized in Yuri Shimai. Like its predecessor, Comic Yuri Hime was also published quarterly but went on to release bi-monthly on odd months from January 2011 to December 2016, after which it became monthly. A sister magazine to Comic Yuri Hime, named Comic Yuri Hime S, was launched as a quarterly publication by Ichijinsha in June 2007. Unlike either Yuri Shimai or Comic Yuri Hime, Comic Yuri Hime S was targeted towards a male audience. However, in 2010 it was merged with Comic Yuri Hime. Ichijinsha published light novel adaptations from Comic Yuri Hime works and original yuri novels under their shōjo light novel line Ichijinsha Bunko Iris starting in July 2008.

Once Comic Yuri Hime helped establish the market, several other yuri anthologies were released, such as Yuri Koi Girls Love Story, Mebae, Yuri Drill, Yuri + Kanojo, and Éclair. Houbunsha and Shinshokan also published their own yuri magazines, Tsubomi and Hirari respectively, with Tsubomi running from February 2009 to December 2012 for a total of 21 issues, and Hirari running from April 2010 to July 2014 for a total of 14 issues. After a successful crowdfunding campaign, the creator-owned yuri anthology magazine Galette was launched in 2017.

=== Outside of Japan ===
The first company to release lesbian-themed manga in North America was Yuricon's publishing arm ALC Publishing. Their works include Rica Takashima's Rica 'tte Kanji!? (1995–1996) and their annual yuri manga anthology Yuri Monogatari, both of which were published in 2003. The latter collects stories by American, European, and Japanese creators, including Akiko Morishima, Althea Keaton, Kristina Kolhi, Tomomi Nakasora, and Eriko Tadeno. These works range from fantasy stories to more realistic tales dealing with themes such as coming out and sexual orientation.

Besides ALC Publishing, the Los Angeles-based Seven Seas Entertainment has also incurred in the genre, with the English version of well-known titles such as Kashimashi: Girl Meets Girl (2004–2007) and Strawberry Panic! (2003–2007). On October 24, 2006, Seven Seas announced the launch of their specialized yuri manga line, which includes titles such as Strawberry Panic!, The Last Uniform (2004–2006), and Comic Yuri Hime's compilations such as Voiceful (2004–2006) and First Love Sisters (2003–2008). Between 2011 and 2013, the now-defunct JManga released several yuri titles to its digital subscription platform, before terminating service on March 13, 2013. As of 2017, Viz Media and Yen Press began publishing yuri manga, with Tokyopop following in 2018. Kodansha Comics announced its debut into publishing both yuri and BL manga in 2019, as well as Digital Manga launching a new imprint specializing in yuri dōjin manga.

As yuri gained further recognition outside Japan, some artists began creating original English-language manga that were labeled as yuri or having yuri elements and subplots. Early examples of original English-language yuri comics include Steady Beat (2003) by Rivkah LaFille and 12 Days (2006) by June Kim, which were published between 2005 and 2006. Additionally, more original English-language visual novels and indie games have marketed themselves as yuri games, such as Highway Blossoms (2016) and Heart of the Woods (2019), both developed by Studio Élan.

By the mid-2010s, yuri video games also began to be officially translated into English. In 2015, MangaGamer announced they would be releasing A Kiss for the Petals, the first license of a yuri game to have an English translation. MangaGamer went on to publish Kindred Spirits on the Roof in 2016, which was one of the first erotic video games to be released uncensored on the Steam store.

== Analysis ==
=== Demography ===
While yuri originated in female-targeted (shōjo, josei) works, the genre has evolved over time to also target a male audience. Various studies have been undertaken to examine the demography of yuri fandom.

==== Publisher studies ====
The first magazine to study the demographics of its readers was Yuri Shimai (2003–2004), who estimated the proportion of women at almost 70%, and that the majority of them were either teenagers or women in their thirties who were already interested in shōjo and BL manga. In 2008, Ichijinsha made a demographic study for its two magazines Comic Yuri Hime and Comic Yuri Hime S, the first being targeted to women, the second to men. The study revealed that women accounted for 73% of Comic Yuri Hime readership, while in Comic Yuri Hime S, men accounted for 62%. The publisher noted, however, that readers of the latter magazine also tended to read the first, which led to their merger in 2010. Regarding the age of women for Comic Yuri Hime, 27% were under 20 years old, 27% were 20–24 years old, 23% were 25–29 years old, and 23% over 30 years old. As of 2017, the ratio of men to women is said to have shifted to about 6:4, thanks in part to the Comic Yuri Hime S merge and the mostly male readership YuruYuri brought with it.

==== Academic studies ====
Verena Maser conducted a study of Japanese yuri fandom demographics between September and October 2011. This study, mainly oriented towards the Yuri Komyu! community and the social network Mixi, received a total of 1,352 valid responses. The study found that 52.4% of respondents were women, 46.1% were men and 1.6% did not identify with either gender. The sexuality of the participants was also requested, separated into two categories: "heterosexual" and "non-heterosexual". The results were as follows: 39.5% were heterosexual men, 30% were non-heterosexual women, 15.2% were heterosexual women, 4.7% were non-heterosexual men, and 1.2% identified as "other". Regarding age, 69% of respondents were 16–25 years old. Maser's study reinforced the notion of the yuri fandom being split somewhat equally between men and women, as well as highlighting the differing sexualities within it.

=== Discussion over connection between yuri and lesbianism ===
==== Semantic connections ====
The relationship between yuri and lesbianism is tenuous in Japan. While yuri was strongly associated with lesbianism in Japan in the 1970s and 1980s, the correlation between the terms has weakened over time. Though Japanese fans, journalists, and publishers recognize that yuri and lesbianism share common characteristics, they can specifically segregate the terms as concepts, with Comic Yurihime editor Seitarō Nakamura stating that "in general, [yuri is] not [about] lesbians [rezubian] with a carnal relationship." Japanese lesbian and queer magazines in the 1990s often opposed the conflation of yuri with lesbianism, likely due to its prior connotation with male-oriented pornography.

Erin Subramian of Yuricon explains that most Japanese people see the term "lesbian" as describing either "abnormal people in pornography or strange people in other countries." Maser concurs that yuri is a genre primarily focused on ideals of beauty, purity, innocence, and spirituality before sexual identity; focus is placed on "connection between hearts" rather than "connection between bodies." Nagaike notes in her analysis of letters published in Comic Yuri Hime that many female readers of the magazine identify as heterosexual; she thus argues yuri is more closely aligned with homosociality than it is with homosexuality, even if the two concepts are not mutually exclusive. Maser analyzes contradictory sources and concludes that the "line between yuri and 'lesbian'/'homosexuality' is…blurry". She notes that in her sources, "the term rezubian [lesbian] is used in many instances, but that it is almost never made clear what exactly it is referring to".

==== Sociopolitical interpretations ====
Nagaike argues that yuri is a byproduct of the shōjo kyōdōtai (少女 共同体; lit. "community of girls"), which formed in pre-war all-girls schools in Japan. Isolated from the influence of patriarchy, adolescent girls created a "shōjo culture" that used Class S literature to disseminate and share homosocial cultural codes. Though this culture was significant in informing girls' attitudes about femininity and independence, it was ultimately ephemeral; upon leaving the single-sex school environment, girls became subject to patriarchal expectations of marriage and family.

As mixed-sex education became more common in the post-war era and Class S literature declined as a means to disseminate homosocial bonds, cross-dressing and BL emerged as the primary modes in literature for women to criticize and resist patriarchy. The emergence of yuri allowed for a return to Class S-style homosociality, of which homosexuality is a component. Thus, Nagaike asserts that yuri does not conform to the political vision of lesbianism espoused by philosophers like Monique Wittig that sees lesbianism as overthrowing "the political and sociological interpretation of women's identity"; rather, yuri is closer to Adrienne Rich's vision of a "lesbian continuum" that seeks to overthrow compulsory heterosexuality.

== See also ==
- Female bonding
- Femslash
- Glossary of anime and manga
- Lesbian erotica
- LGBT rights in Japan
- Romantic friendship
- Sapphism
- Sexual minorities in Japan
- Womance
- Women who have sex with women
- Yaoi
