= List of Jewelpets and Sweetspets =

Jewelpets (ジュエルペット, Juerupetto) are fictional animals that debuted in the Jewelpet franchise created jointly by Sanrio and Sega Sammy Holdings. They are all named after famous birthstones and jewels, each with a different kind of jewel for their eyes, used for casting magic. In the entire franchise, there are a total of 42 Jewelpets in each species and class.

According to the franchise's backstory, the Jewelpets themselves were all born from jewels and minerals after a powerful magician used their magic to bring them to life. They live in a mystical place called Jewel Land, attending a school to learn more about magic and each of them were paired with their own human partners.

== Physiology and appearance ==
A Jewelpet's appearance depends on which species they are based on. They have small bodies with little arms and legs and a big head. Each Jewelpet has signature glass-like irises called Jewel Eyes, special eyes that are colored differently depending on their Magical Class. The eyes were used by a Jewelpet itself to cast magic; however, in order to master it, rigorous training should be done. Jewelpets can also walk using their legs but sometimes goes on all fours when running. They can also fly using magical broomsticks as well, but some pets like Rin, Io and Aqua don't use brooms to fly. This concept however was forgotten in the second series, Jewelpet Twinkle.

Each Jewelpet's size also depends on the species, with the biggest being Rald, who is the same size as a human being while the smallest is Charotte, who is much smaller than a regular-sized Jewelpet. Jewelpets are also capable of human speech and can understand both Jewel Landian language and human language altogether. However, a few exceptions were done to some, like Rald.

== Jewelpets ==
=== Mascot Trio ===
| Name | Jewel | Magical Class | Species | Gender | Jewel Power | Birthdate | Episode Debut | Voice Actor |
|---|---|---|---|---|---|---|---|---|
| Ruby (ルビー, Rubī) | Ruby | Red | Japanese hare | Female | Luck and Courage | July 29 | EP 1 | Ayaka Saitō |
The Jewelpet of Luck and Courage, Ruby is a female white Japanese hare with a cherry jewel necklace and a cherry blossom flower on her left ear. She is polite, tidy, and loves to watch cherry blossoms bloom. Usually her Jewel Power is increasing someone's luck, though this was changed when the anime first aired. In her human form, Ruby is portrayed as a girl with dark rose hair. She wears similarly to a schoolgirl outfit, with a jacket, skirt, and sneakers. Ruby is the only of the mascot trio to have Acrylic Class magic, which can cause bad luck and explosions when she casts it. She has also the ability to summon Opal, though only temporarily after her training with Labra on mastering her magic. Ruby can also use the Jewel Pod in certain stations as well as the Jewel Watch in the later series. She is also one of the 9 main Jewelpets to be based on a Pretty Cure from “KiraKira PreCure A La Mode”, in this case, Cure Chocolat.
| Garnet (ガーネット, Gānetto) | Garnet | Red | Persian cat | Female | Love | January 8 | EP 2 | Aya Hirano |
The Jewelpet of Love, Garnet is a female pink Persian cat with a pink hexagon jewel necklace and a red ribbon on her right ear. She is prideful, but a very hard-working. As a human, Garnet is depicted with pink hair. Other than her magic skills, Garnet demonstrates good special skills regarding fashion, knowing which clothing is good for the wearer or choosing a good dress. She can also wield a miniaturized version of the Jewel Stick to summon other Jewelpets from Jewel Land. She is also one of the 9 main Jewelpets to be based on a Pretty Cure from “KiraKira PreCure A La Mode”, in this case, Cure Whip.
| Sapphie (サフィー, Safī) | Sapphire | Blue | Cavalier King Charles Spaniel | Female | Friendship | September 1 | EP 3 | Nozomi Sasaki |
The Jewelpet of Friendship, Sapphie is a female yellow furred and blue eared Cavalier King Charles Spaniel with a blue jewel necklace shaped like a G-clef note and a pink and blue flower tiara on her forehead. She is very quiet and discreet, and loves to look at the outside world. In her human form, Sapphie is depicted as a girl with light blue hair. Sapphie usually relies mainly on both science and magic in all of her studies. She can also wield a miniaturized version of the Jewel Stick for her magic or with Ruby and Garnet, to summon other Jewelpets from Jewel Land. In Kira Deco, Sapphie wields a Jewel Pod and a Jewel Watch as well. She is also one of the 9 main Jewelpets to be based on a Pretty Cure from “KiraKira PreCure A La Mode”,in this case, Cure Gelato.

=== Magical Red Class ===
| Name | Jewel | Species | Gender | Jewel Power | Birthdate | Episode Debut | Voice Actor |
|---|---|---|---|---|---|---|---|
| Rin (リン, Rin) | Citrine | Parakeet | Female | Prosperity | November 23 | EP 4 | Mayu Hayakawa (First - Kira Deco); Akari Harashima (Happiness) |
The Jewelpet of Prosperity, Rin is a lime green parakeet who wears a pink bow on the back of her head and a necklace shaped like a yellow butterfly. First appearing in episode 4 of the first series, Rin always talks about business and economy and uses an abacus to calculate. She also speaks in a Kansai dialect and is prone to funny jokes. She became the Jewelpet partner of Raako Menma, after restoring her family's restaurant's business. In Jewelpet Twinkle, she appeared alongside Moldavite, greeting the new students in Jewel Land, including Ruby. Her speeches always end with "~rin". She also appears on Jewelpet Sunshine as the Jewelpet partner of Prince Kameo.
| Ryl (リル, Riru) | Red beryl | Miniature pig | Female | Mind and Body Purification | April 24 | EP 9 | Tomomi Fujita |
The Jewelpet of Mind and Body Purification, Ryl is a pink miniature pig who wears a necklace shaped like a red heart. Debuting in episode 9 of the first series, Ryl is a Jewelpet with the title of "Miss Jewel Land". She likes fashion and so considers Garnet her rival. Her speech ends in "Butsukushii". When she was awakened from her Jewel Charm form, her partner Megumi thought that she wasn't cute but she has a change of heart and accepts her. She usually carries a mirror just like Garnet. Ryl reappears again in Jewelpet Twinkle as the Jewelpet partner of Catherine, challenging Ruby, Garnet and Sapphie into a cooking battle. She appears in Jewelpet Sunshine as one of Dian's fans.
| Kohaku (コハク, Kohaku) | Amber | Shiba Inu | Male | Leadership (Official); Economic Fortune (First series) | June 5 | EP 14 | Junko Minagawa |
The Jewelpet of Leadership (Economic Fortune in the first series), Kohaku is a yellow Shiba Inu who wears a red scarf with a gold flower on it. He debuted in episode 14 of the first series, after his Jewel Charm was revealed in front of the Phantom Herb Thieves and was then awakened by Rinko's upgraded Jewel Pocketbook, supposedly to be Aojiso's Jewelpet Partner, even though he doesn't end up in the hands of the thieves until episode 52. He is an energetic and honorific character and sometimes has a slight cold. In Jewelpet Twinkle, he's the apprentice of the Fountain Dragon, who has a hot blooded spirit although he's rash. He is appointed to carry the Dragon's Jewel. In Kira Deco, Kohaku is one of the Four Heavenly Kings, who uses his cuteness charm at his opponents and distracting them into believing him. He is partnered by Tour and like him, he transformed back into his Charm Form after Retsu goes berserk. In Happiness, he is a fan of Kousuke Sanada and wishes to be as cool as him by impressing a girl; which in actuality is Apel with his hair down. He eventually forms a Magic Gem with Kousuke in the end. In Lady, he is one of the dogs being tested for dog-walking.
| Titana (チターナ, Chitāna) | Titanite | Chipmunk | Male | Work Luck (Official); Balance (First series) | September 23 | EP 29 | Erika |
The Jewelpet of Work Luck (Balance in the first series), Titana is a yellowish-orange chipmunk with brown stripes, who wears a blue cap and a necklace shaped like a yellow and orange flower. Debuting in episode 29 of the first series, Titana is the fastest of all the Jewelpets in Jewel Land as well as a fast talker. He is very active and nimble, and a self-styled Tokyoite. He is an honor student in Jewel Land, earning him the Crystal Class ranking in magic. He became Kuranosuke's Jewelpet partner. In Jewelpet Twinkle, he is Nicola's partner who thinks that Akari and Ruby are still novices in magic. His speeches always end with "~dechu" and he also loves popcorn. He appears again in Jewelpet Sunshine as one of the students at the Sunshine Academy and an admirer of Kanon. In Kira Deco, he is a Jewelpet who is a master of a martial arts skill called "The Way of the Tail", but is actually a scammer that sucks his student's life forces out of their bodies. He is then arrested by both Labra and Angela. In Happiness, Titana works as a Jewelpet comedian, but his jokes fall flat towards the human girls sometimes.
| Sango (サンゴ, Sango) | Coral | Tabby cat | Female | Protection (Official); Luck (First Series) | July 10 | EP 31 | Rei Sakai (First); Ai Shimizu (Twinkle onwards) |
The Jewelpet of Protection (Luck in the first series), Sango is a yellow and brown striped tabby cat who wears a red and white bow and a necklace shaped like a pink strawberry. Debuting in episode 31 of the first series, Sango is energetic, bright and likes to twirl her ribbon similarly to rhythmic gymnastics. She also has a habit to say "daijoubu" all the time and her speeches ends in "Nyan". She became the Jewelpet partner of Lyrica Himeno. In Jewelpet Twinkle, she is Miria's Jewelpet partner along with Garnet. She likes cakes and sweets so much, and sometimes has good knowledge on some desserts she eats and knows how bad Miria's desserts are only by tasting them. She and Garnet both have a crush on Dian. In Jewelpet Sunshine, she is a student of the 3rd Grade Rose Section and has a crush on Jasper. She is also Komachi's Roommate. Sango also has brief appearances in Kira Deco, serving as a narrator. She is also a judge in episode 39, and questioning Angela in a police desk. In Happiness, she works as a school nurse, also appearing as a member of GoKuRo-san trio. In Magical Change, she works at a bakery in the Jewel Mall and is one of the few Jewelpets to achieve their human form. She is also one of the 9 main Jewelpets to be based on a Pretty Cure from “KiraKira PreCure A La Mode”, in this case, Cure Custard.
| Nix (ニック, Nikku) | Sardonyx | Ferret | Male | Reconciliation | August 22 | EP 33 | Yuichi Iguchi |
The Jewelpet of Reconciliation, Nix is a purple ferret with a black tail tip who wears a blue scarf with an orange star on it. Debuting in episode 33 of the first series, Nix is a member of the Jewel Eight and was the first Jewelpet to fall under Dian's dark magic, since he doesn't like the idea of fighting and considers himself a pacifist. He caused a major argument in the human world by using his dark jewel magic. He was then reclaimed by Rinko's group through the Jewel Games. He appears again in Jewelpet Twinkle along with Alex and Brownie and is revealed to have a crush on both Garnet, Sapphie and Prase. His human partner is not yet named. He appears again on Jewelpet Sunshine as one of Kaiya's guests. In Kira Deco, he is a member of the NEET Triangle along with Yuku and Chite, and wishes to be noticed by the others.
| Alex (アレク, Areku) | Alexandrite | Scottish Fold | Male | Dream Fulfillment (Official); Possibility (First series) | March 3 | EP 44 | Hiromi Igarashi; Asami Shidara (Twinkle) |
The Jewelpet of Dream Fulfillment (Possibility in the first series), Alex is a brown and yellow Scottish Fold cat who wears round glasses and a necklace shaped like a red spade. Debuting in episode 44 of the first series as a member of the Jewel Eight, Alex and Brownie caused the worst-case scenario in the human world by creating a meteor on a crash course to Earth. He and Brownie are recovered by Rinko's group through the Jewel Games while saving the earth from the impending destruction in the process. Both him and Brownie are best friends. He appears again in Jewelpet Twinkle along with Brownie and Nix and is revealed to have a crush on both Garnet, Sapphie and Prase. His human partner is not yet named. In Jewelpet Sunshine, he appears alongside King and Brownie as part of a fruit-selling organization. He then appears in Kira Deco as one of Garnet's guests in her ballroom dance. He invites Pink to dance with him, which she rejects. He also cameos in episode 47 along with Brownie; looking at a TV store.
| Brownie (ブラウニー, Buraunī) | Brown quartz | Hedgehog | Male | Inspiration (Official); Imagination (First series) | October 23 | EP 44 | Yui Hatano |
The Jewelpet of Inspiration (Imagination in the first series), Brownie is a yellow hedgehog with blue prickles who wears a purple bow tie with a brown jewel in the middle. Debuting in episode 44 of the first series as a member of the Jewel Eight along with Alex, Brownie uses his powers during the conference about the meteor and made themgo into hallucinations to make people forget their duties. They were both recovered by Rinko's group through the Jewel Games while saving the earth from the impending destruction and making the people snap out of their hallucinations. Both him and Alex are best friends and his speech ends in "Uni". He appears again in Jewelpet Twinkle along with Alex and Nix and is revealed to have a crush on both Garnet, Sapphie and Prase. His human partner is not yet named. In Jewelpet Sunshine, he appears alongside King and Alex as part of a fruit-selling organization. In Kira Deco, he serves as a narrator and also makes a cameo in episode 47 with Alex; looking at a TV store.
| Jasper (ジャスパー, Jasupā) | Jasper | Cheetah | Male | Honesty (Official); Strong Will (Twinkle) | February 14 | JPT EP 50 | KENN |
The Jewelpet of Honesty (Strong Will in Twinkle), Jasper is a yellow cheetah with brown spots who wears a red diamond jewel necklace and a gold tail ring with a diamond jewel in it. He first appeared in the end segment of episodes 42 and 43 of Jewelpet Twinkle, on which he narrates the end segments of the series about the Jewel Star Grand Prix. He then formally appears in episode 50 during the Finals of the Jewel Star Grand Prix as the gatekeeper of the magic gate, usually wields a giant magic key with the Jewel Land emblem on it. He summon this key from his tail and uses it to open up a path to the Human World. In Sunshine, he is a student of the Plum class and rooms with Mikage and Masago. Opal has a crush on him and he possesses a Jewel Pod as well. In Kira Deco, he is shown to be the sheriff of Jewel Town who helped Midori to arrest Tata, and Retsu delivers the final blow. He also attends Garnet's ball to learn how to dance with Opal. In Happiness, Jasper works as a repairman in Jewel Land, fixing the broken air conditioner that is gone berserk due to a magic mishap. In Lady, he serves as a fortune teller; which Momona and Cayenne attend to on their date.
| Rosa (ローサ, Rōsa) | Inca rose | Ussuri brown bear | Female | Passion | June 18 | JPKD EP 52 | Ai Kayano |
The Jewelpet of Passion, Rosa is a light pink Ussuri brown bear with pink ears and a pink tail who wears a red apple-shaped jewel necklace and a big blue and yellow bow on her head. First appearing in the final episode of Jewelpet Kira Deco, Rosa was born from the Mirror Ball and Decolina's magic after it was completely repaired. She is first seen in her charm form after Labra was revived and later on awakened at the last minute. She also appears in Jewelpet Happiness as one of Ruby's friends at the Jewel Academy, managing the Jewelpet Cafe Happiness. She usually works as a waitress but has some rivalry issues with Labra and she is very brave and wants to help everyone, even though wanting to stay in the shadows. In Lady, she is the partner of Lady Elena.

=== Magical Green Class ===
| Name | Jewel | Species | Gender | Jewel Power | Birthdate | Episode Debut | Voice Actor |
|---|---|---|---|---|---|---|---|
| Chite (カイト, Kaito) | Malachite | Jack Russell Terrier | Male | Sports (Official); Assistance (First series) | December 4 | EP 5 | Miyuki Sawashiro |
The Jewelpet of Sports (Assistance in the first series), Chite is a brown-and-white Jack Russell Terrier who wears a red bowtie with a green jewel in the middle. Debuting in episode 5 of the first series, Chite is a cheerful Jewelpet who wants to cheer up Hisashi and calls him "Aniki". He sometimes wears in Ōendan clothing and uses fans to cheer Hisashi or everyone near him. His speech always ends with "~wan". He appears again in Jewelpet Twinkle as one of the three Jewelpets that grew in huge sizes due to Sara's Magic. In Jewelpet Sunshine, he is a student of the 3rd Grade Rose Section. In Kira Deco, he is a member of the NEET Triangle along with Nix and Yuku. He also makes brief cameos in Happiness.
| Prase (プレーズ, Purēzu) | Chrysoprase | Toy Poodle | Female | Studying | February 14 | EP 6 | Ai Iwamura |
The Jewelpet of Studying, Prase is a brown Toy Poodle who wears two yellow daisies near her orange hair ears and a necklace shaped like a green four-leaved clover. Debuting in episode 6 of the first series, Prase is one of Ruby's friends, who was awakened after Misaki realized how her older sister cared for her and to keep on studying. She then became her Jewelpet partner. Prase appears again in Jewelpet Twinkle under the ownership of Judy, a former Jewel Star Grand Prix Champion. Prase is also the Bell Ringer of the Magic Academy. She appears on Jewelpet Sunshine as one of Dian's fans and also narrates some of the episodes in Kira Deco. Prase gets a more prominent role in Jewelpet Happiness, who studied Theatrical Arts in France, speaks with a French accent and is well known for producing plays.
| Rald (ラルド, Rarudo) | Emerald | Giant panda | Male | Happiness (Official); Harmony (First series) | May 17 | EP 8 | Mayumi Tsuchiya |
The Jewelpet of Happiness (Harmony in the first series), Rald is a black and white giant panda who wears a dark pink waistcoat and a pink and yellow striped hat. He also wears a dark green jewel necklace. Debuting in episode 8 of the first series, Rald is an easy going Jewelpet at one's own pace. He is good at playing musical instruments; especially the ocarina, and sometimes says Nakayo and Kikotoha in one of his speeches. He was awakened when Rinko convinced her parents not to divorce, and became the Jewelpet partner of Rinko's parents. He later reappears in Jewelpet Twinkle along with Peridot in the human world, searching for a "Sparkling Round Thingy" to make his wish come true and find his partner. But he somehow caused Peridot a lot of trouble in Akari's school during the new year. His speeches always end with "~rarudo" and refers to Labra as "Senpai". In Sunshine, he is in the Plum class. He is both feared and popular among his classmates, because of the effect his cuteness has on them. He appears again in Kira Deco in two episodes, with the notable one being with him taking care of Luna before she goes back to the moon. Usually he can't speak fluently and only says "Mofu" all the time. His pink waistcoat is a memento from Mako's grandfather, who first arrived in Jewel Land several years ago before the Kira Deco 5's arrival. Rald once again appeared in Happiness, which like his other counterparts, can't talk fluently except in the episode's end sequence. He befriends Apel after he accidentally found the box he's in on the Jewel Lake. Later on, both developed a good friendship with each other, allowing him to obtain his own Magic Gem.
| Tour (トール, Tōru) | Tourmaline | American Shorthair | Male | Friendship Bonds (Official); Adventure (First series) | October 13 | EP 10 | Junko Takeuchi |
The Jewelpet of Friendship Bonds (Adventure in the first series), Tour is a gray American Shorthair cat who symbolizes adventure and wears a necklace shaped like a green star. Debuting in episode 10 of the first series, Tour is aristocratic, charismatic and kind to everyone, especially to Ruby, who loves him. He is a good adventurer and has good physical and reflex capabilities. He sometimes called "Tour-sama" by Ruby when he first met her and sometimes makes Ruby go nuts for him when he's around. He is the Jewelpet partner of the Asaoka Twins. He appears again in Jewelpet Twinkle as Sulfur's Jewelpet partner, also saving Ruby from drowning in one episode. Being the partner of Sulfur, he usually acts as a mentor to his classmates, while also getting Sulfur himself to act a little more confident and brave in his speeches. In Jewelpet Sunshine, he is in the Rose class and is Ruby's childhood friend and ex-boyfriend, who went to Spain to study. His Spanish accent is a result of an accident involving a tomato-throwing festival and a very hot-blooded Spanish man. He plays the guitar and still has a crush on her, making him a rival to Mikage. Ruby accepts his feelings but rejects him to be with Mikage (who later gets transformed into Granite in the epilogue of the series). He has a brief appearance in Kira Deco at Sapphie's book shop in episode 6 and attending Garnet's ball in episode 24, later revealed to be one of the Four Heavenly Kings sent by Decoranian to collect and steal the Deco Stones. He is partnered by Kohaku but got turned into a Jewel Charm in the end. In Happiness, Tour is a wandering Jewelpet who knew Ruby and the others. He also developed a good relationship with Mouri and helped him overcome his fears.
| Flora (フローラ, Furōra) | Fluorite | Sheep | Female | Stress Removal (Official); Future Prediction (First series) | January 17 | EP 11 | Aki Kanada |
The Jewelpet of Stress Removal (Future Prediction in the first series), Flora is a yellow wooled sheep with a white face and ears who wears a green bow around her neck with a bell hanging from it. She first appeared in episode 11 of the first series, as Tatewaki's partner. She has a pure, tenderhearted, easy-going personality, always looking up to her partner like he's her big brother. Her speech always ends with "~desu". She was awakened when Tatewaki was under the influence of Diana's dark magic, then became Keigo's Jewelpet partner. She later appeared on Jewelpet Twinkle during the Jewel Star Grand Prix in a chase game against between Akari and Marianne. She appears in Jewelpet Sunshine who lives on a farm and became friends with Angela, though it causes Labra to be jealous. She ends her speeches with "Moco". Flora also appears in Kira Deco, and usually has a lot of wool all over her body. She is in fact the source of the best wool of all of Jewel Land. She also appears in one episode of Happiness, working on a farm to deliver milk and yogurt to the Jewelpet Café Happiness. She has a habit on getting her words mixed up and has a crush on Taira.
| Peridot (ペリドット, Peridotto) | Peridot | Papillon | Female | Positiveness (Official); Dream Fulfillment (First series) | August 3 | EP 12 | Yuki Kaida |
The Jewelpet of Positiveness (Dream Fulfillment in the first series), Peridot is a yellow and green Papillon who wears a green hairclip shaped like a butterfly, and a yellow and green flower garland around her neck. Debuting in episode 12 of the first series, Peridot is the Gajin of all the residents of Jewel Land. She is popular, energetic and an English Speaker. She is also one of the owners of the "Strawberry Cafe" in both Jewel Land and on Earth along with Milky and Luna. In Jewelpet Twinkle, Peridot is a Jewelpet who has the ability to see through someone's dreams, especially when she noticed on how not sure what Akari's dream is. She is also seen hanging out with Akari and her friends and somehow has a big sister attitude towards Rald, especially when she gets angry. Peridot is the second Jewelpet in Jewelpet Twinkle who can fly other than Rin and the first who has a personal magic spell. By the OVA, she is now the Jewelpet Partner of a new Jewel Star Candidate. In Jewelpet Sunshine, she is one of the students at Jewel Land's Sunshine Academy and also the most athletic of the group. She also works for the Academy's newspaper group and is also a figure skater. In the later series, she is revealed to be one of the Wise Ones and became a professional figure skater in the series finale. In Kira Deco, Peridot is a passionate Jewelpet who has a knack for adventure. She usually flies a plane and can also fly by flapping her ears. In Happiness, Peridot works as a fortune teller in Jewel Land and also Ayame's babysitter, who yearns to get a Magic Gem. But she is also having financial troubles in her job as well as having no customers. Chiari and her friends helped her out on her problems. In Lady, she serves as a temporary replacement partner for Momona after Ruby leaves her, before the two make up in the end. In Magical Change, she is an employee at a sushi shop and is one of the few Jewelpets to achieve their human form; in this case, Peridot has lime green hair, the same color as her ears. She also wears a vest and shorts. She is also one of the 9 main Jewelpets to be based on a Pretty Cure from “KiraKira PreCure A La Mode”, in this case, Cure Parfait.
| Milky (ミルキィ, Mirukyi) | Milky quartz | Chihuahua | Female | Sympathy | April 8 | EP 13 | Keiko Utsumi |
The Jewelpet of Sympathy, Milky is a pastel blue and pink Chihuahua who wears a light green bow around her neck and a white frilly cap. Debuting in episode 13 of the first series, Milky is the "scaredy cat" of all the Jewelpets, and can be somewhat cowardly at times. She speaks with a Tohoku dialect and her speech always end with "~desu". She's also one of the owners of the "Strawberry Cafe" in both Jewel Land and on Earth along with Peridot and Luna. She, along with Luna, also appeared in the end segments of Jewelpet Twinkle and also one of the three assistant Jewelpets of Halite. They were also commentators for the Jewel Star Grand Prix. In Jewelpet Sunshine, she is a student in the 3rd Grade Rose Section who is a classmate of Diana. She excels on figure skating and is a rival of Peridot. In Kira Deco, she is a wandering sweet potato dealer who is preventing the destruction of Jewel Land through special offerings. She believes on the prophecies written by Tonzuradamus, and prevents them from happening. In Happiness, Milky is Draggy's foster mother, who found his egg years ago and raised him as her own child. When the Red Moon is controlling him, she perseveres to stop him from harming other people.
| Nephrite (ネフライト, Nefuraito) | Nephrite | Pembroke Welsh Corgi | Male | Likeability (Official); Teamwork (First series) | February 1 | EP 16 | Megumi Ozaki |
The Jewelpet of Likeability (Teamwork in the first series), Nephrite is a brown and white Pembroke Welsh Corgi who wears a blue checked flat cap and a green jewel necklace shaped like a diamond. He first appeared in episode 16 of the first series, where he was awakened by Akira and then became his human partner. He is mischievous, funky, likes soul music and dance in a cheerful way. His speech always ends with "~geroppa". He appears again in Jewelpet Twinkle as one of the three Jewelpets that grew to a huge size due to Sara's magic. In Jewelpet Sunshine, he is a student in the 3rd Grade Rose Section. In Kira Deco, he is a cleaner for hire who is employed by Coal to capture Ruby to get her Jewel Pod. However, he ends up falling in love with her, distracting him from his mission and ending up betraying Coal. He also appears in Happiness, having a crush on Sapphie. In Lady, he is one of the dogs being tested for dog-walking. He used to be Lady Diana's partner for the same test, but witnessed her running away with Alto, which led him to become more cynical and sarcastic.
| Tata (タータ, Tāta) | Turquoise | Squirrel monkey | Male | Courage | December 19 | EP 32 | Junko Takeuchi |
The Jewelpet of Courage, Tata is a white and grey squirrel monkey who wears a dark teal tie. Debuting in episode 32 of the first series, Tata has the same traits as Ruby, being joyful, brash, happy and sometimes a big troublemaker as well. But he also likes to play and eat. His magic is also in the Acrylic Class ranking, which also causes explosions and bad luck. Both he and Ruby sometimes argue and can't get along with each other. He again appeared in one of the episodes of Jewelpet Twinkle as a Jewelpet Akari and the others must catch in their first test. Many clones of him appeared on Jewelpet Sunshine in one episode during the Summer Arc. In Kira Deco, he is a wanted troublemaker due to him stealing a lot of stuff in Jewel Town. He is then captured by the combined efforts of Jasper, Midori and Retsu. However, he escapes prison, leaving Jasper in pursuit of him once more. He also has a cameo appearance in Happiness, before having a major role in episode 40, being a victim of the Red Moon which enlarges him to massive proportions.
| Kris (クリス, Kurisu) | Chrysocolla | Miniature Dachshund | Male | Relationships (Official); Work Luck (First series) | July 5 | EP 37 | Aki Kanada |
The Jewelpet of Relationships (Work Luck in the first series), Kris is a grey Miniature Dachshund who wears a black waistcoat and a dark green bowtie. Debuting in episode 37 in the first series as a member of the Jewel Eight, Dian brainwashes him into cursing the Strawberry Cafe, causing Luna, Milky and Peridot to lose all their customers. He was then reclaimed by Rinko's group through the efforts of the three Jewelpets through the Jewel Games and became the manager of the Strawberry Cafe on Earth. He speaks in a Kyoto dialect. He has both cameo appearances in Twinkle and Sunshine. In Kira Deco, Kris owns a clothing store in Jewel Town. He helped Pink provide some of his clothing, but none of it seems to work on her due to the size. In Lady, he is one of the dogs being tested for dog-walking.
| Angela (エンジェラ, Enjera) | Angelite | Alpaca | Female | Realization (Official); Solace (Twinkle) | March 30 | JPT EP 52 | Aki Toyosaki |
The Jewelpet of Realization (Solace in Twinkle), Angela is a pastel pink alpaca with a white face and ears who wears two flower garlands on her ears and a blue jewel necklace with white angel wings. In most series, she always ends her speeches with "~Paca". Formally debuting in the last episode of Twinkle, Angela is one of Fealina's Jewelpet partners alongside Opal who once used their powers to seal the Battest. But for unknown reasons, she died along with Fealina to do so, reverting her into a Jewel Charm before the events of the anime began. Her Jewel Charm was found by Alma in episode 36 and used it as a key to unseal the Battest. She was seen again revived in the last episode alongside Jasper, talking to Ruby about the Flower of Happiness. In Jewelpet Sunshine, she is one of the students at Jewel Land's Sunshine Academy. Her song can actually make Labra fall asleep. She doesn't usually speak fully until in episode 12. She and Labra were both revealed as one of the Wise Ones and later ends up the Shouko, competing in the Moto GP in the epilogue. Angela possesses a Jewel Pod like the others, used to cast spells. In Kira Deco, she alongside Labra were both police officers of Jewel Town, usually a patrol officer. Though she has a laid back personality, Angela is sometimes very friendly, except she gets angry. In Happiness, she is also one of Ruby's Friends who is given a mission to make friends and open the Jewelpet Cafe Happiness. Her job in the cafe is a waitress. Despite going on her own pace, she is strong willed and looks after both Labra and Rosa. She also has a hobby on growing beautiful flowers.

=== Magical Blue Class ===
| Name | Jewel | Species | Gender | Jewel Power | Birthdate | Episode Debut | Voice Actor |
|---|---|---|---|---|---|---|---|
| Luna (ルナ, Runa) | Moonstone | Netherland Dwarf | Female | Charm Improvement | June 8 | EP 15 | Rumi Shishido (First - Happiness) misono (Magical Change) |
The Jewelpet of Charm Improvement, Luna is a pink and yellow Netherland Dwarf hare who wears a blue bow and a necklace shaped like a blue crescent moon. Debuting in episode 15 of the first series, Luna is the most artistic of all the Jewelpets, sometimes drawing good pictures in her sketchbook. In the former series, she is somewhat a bit fussy and dimwitted but very boastful, sweet, and calm to others around her. Her speech always ends with "~dana" and her magic is in the Glass Class ranking, on which her magic has a time limit, which lasts until exactly 12:00 midnight. She's also one of the owners of the "Strawberry Cafe" in both Jewel Land and on Earth along with Milky and Peridot. She along with Milky also appeared in the end segments of Jewelpet Twinkle and is also one of the assistant Jewelpets of Halite. In Jewelpet Sunshine, she is a student in the third grade rose section school and also one of Diana's close friends. In Kira Deco, Luna is a Jewelpet living on the moon. But strangely due to the events of episode 27, she ended up in Jewel Land, without her memories and shrunk down to small size due to a Deco Stone inside a bamboo cane. She was found by Rald and raised her as his own child, only later revealing her true self after the Kira Deco 5 reclaimed the Deco Stone. She leaves Jewel Land and returns to the Moon, saying goodbye to the one who raised her. In Happiness, Luna works as Jewel Land's mail carrier, who is worried on her job due to summer fatigue. In Magical Change, she is one of Airi's 4 Jewelpet partners who made their stay in her house. She usually wears glasses, as well as in her human form. She is also one of the 9 main Jewelpets to be based on a Pretty Cure from “KiraKira PreCure A La Mode”, in this case, Cure Lumiere.
| Yuku (ユーク, Yūku) | Euclase | Beagle | Male | Intelligence | November 3 | EP 17 | Hitomi Yoshida |
The Jewelpet of Intelligence, Yuku is a tricolor Beagle who wears a blue beret and a light blue bow tie. He first appeared in episode 17 of the first series when Rinko and her friends discovered his Jewel Charm inside the Prime Minister's office when they were tasked with figuring out Diana's whereabouts. Due to his lack of talent at magic (being at Acrylic Class), Yuku is rather prideful and reluctant to help anyone. He compensates for it by being extremely intelligent and hard-working. Since he's practically incapable of using magic, he relies exclusively on his deducting skills, which eventually allows Diana's headquarters to be found, though to little avail as she simply teleported herself and her mansion away. He appears on Jewelpet Twinkle in the Grand Prix Arc along with his partner Gunho. They lost by Akari and Ruby during the semi-finals. He appears again on Jewelpet Sunshine, where Ruby went to a group date and noticed him drawing. Yuku asks her to pretend to marry him to make his foster parents happy. She later tells him off for this and beats him up, making him fall for her. In Kira Deco, he is a member of the NEET Triangle trio along with Nix and Chite, and wishes to be noticed by others. In Happiness, he is looking for a lost girl who helped him years ago, who is actually Taira Izumi. In Lady, he is one of the dogs being tested for dog-walking.
| Aqua (アクア, Akua) | Aquamarine | Clownfish | Male | Satisfaction (Official); Calmness (First series and Twinkle) | March 26 | EP 21 | Yakkun Sakurazuka (First - Twinkle); Kōsuke Okano (Sunshine onwards) |
The Jewelpet of Satisfaction (Calmness in the first series and Twinkle), Aqua is a clownfish who wears a chain of blue jewels on his head. First introduced in episode 21 of the first series, Aqua is one of the most unusual Jewelpets in Jewel Land due to his species, where he is bonded with Naoto Sakuragi and became his Jewelpet partner. He has a sagely countenance and tries to advise Naoto in every way he can. However, he hates being called a goldfish and goes berserk when he's called one, growing bigger in size. He can fly without the aid of a broom. He reappears again in Jewelpet Twinkle, now living in the seas surrounding Jewel Land. He also appears on Jewelpet Sunshine as the Jewelpet partner of Princess Fukaet. He has brief cameos in both Kira Deco and Happiness.
| Kaiya (カイヤ, Kaiya) | Kyanite | Siamese cat | Female | Decisiveness (Official); Independence (First series) | May 15 | EP 24 | Kanako Sakai |
The Jewelpet of Decisiveness (Independence in the first series), Kaiya is a brown and tan Siamese cat who wears a tiara and a necklace shaped like a blue rose. Debuting in episode 24 of the first series, Kaiya is a Jewelpet who has a Glass Class ranking in her magic and is aware of Mint's condition while working with Diana, thus, she cannot become independent on her own. She casts her spell of independence on Mint hoping that it will change her. However Mint abandons her in the same episode but after she and the rest of the Phantom Herb Thieves betrayed Diana, they went to her side and Kaiya helped them change their ways for the better. She also appeared in episode 51 and again in episode 52, convincing Diana that she needed to lend her powers to stop Dark Dian and save her brother from the dark magic. Kaiya reappears again in Jewelpet Twinkle as the Jewelpet partner of Marianne. She, Amelie and Ryl challenged Ruby, Garnet and Sapphie into a cooking battle. She appears again in Jewelpet Sunshine, apparently known as the "Queen of Group Dates" who hosted her own Karaoke party. She also appeared in Happiness, as a beauty coach to Chiari and the others. She is actually a model who likes to give the girls a serious makeover despite Nene's disapproval. Kaiya realized this and later gave them a second chance on trying to be appealing. In European merchandise, her name is spelled "Kya".
| Opal (オパール, Opāru) | Opal | Winged unicorn | Female | Hidden Talent (Official); Awakening and Miracles (First series) | October 3 | EP 26 | Miyuki Sawashiro |
The Jewelpet of Hidden Talent (Awakening and Miracles in the first series), Opal is a blue winged unicorn with a purple mane and tail and a yellow horn who wears strings of multi-coloured beads on her wings. Appearing in episode 26 and again in episode 51, she is a legendary Jewelpet who restored a war-torn Jewel Land 1000 years ago and banished evil and dark magic in both worlds. Because of her supreme power to cause miracles, she can only be awakened using the Jewel Stick and with someone who has the Superior Crystal Class Magic ranking. She can also appear when a great crisis befalls both worlds and can stop it from happening. In episode 51, her powers were ineffective against Dark Dian, thus lending her powers to the Jewel Stick with the other Jewelpets to defeat Dark Dian once and for all. In Jewelpet Twinkle, she was once the Jewelpet partner of Fealina and also Alma before she created Diana, valuing her life because of her pain and sorrow she's going through. Unlike Diana, Opal refuses to go along with Alma's plans and tries to make her come to reason. She protects the Fountain Dragon from Alma's attack at the cost of her own life in episode 26, turning into her Jewel Charm form. Her spirit appears on occasion to warn Akari, Ruby and Labra about Alma's plans. She was revived during episode 51. In Jewelpet Sunshine, she is in the Plum class and serves as the vice-class representative. She is shy and cries easily, though she's also very hard-working. She is good friends with (and has a crush on) Jasper. In Kira Deco, she is one of Coal's lackeys, who intends to getting the Deco Stones. She is considered as a "Gothic Princess", who has a snooty personality and enjoys belittling others, even though Io is always with her. Her hatred for Ruby started when she questioned about the "Bump" on her head, which is actually her horn and embarrassing her in front of others. After that experience, she vowed that she will have her revenge. In the later episodes, she decides to set aside her vengeance and work together with Ruby. She also has a minor appearance in Happiness with her major appearance in episode 20. Opal once befriended Master, who once tasted his special blend of coffee that melted her heart and made her change. Though sometimes strict yet prideful towards Taira regarding coffee, she and him can relate to each other. She makes a few cameos in Lady. In Magical Change, she is a strict coach-like leader who commands all of the Jewelpets to find ways to restore the Jewel Castle back to its normal state.
| Amelie (アメリ, Ameri) | Amethyst | Djungarian hamster | Female | Bonds | February 9 | EP 34 | Aoi Yūki |
The Jewelpet of Bonds, Amelie is a grey and white Djungarian hamster who wears two green bows on her ears (dark green when corrupted) and wears a dark purple jewel necklace. Debuting in episode 34 of the first series, Amelie is one of the Jewel Eight and was in Dian's control. She caused all the babies to turn against their parents, but was then reclaimed by Rinko's group again through the Jewel Games after Dian's group lost. Amelie reappears again in Jewelpet Twinkle as the Jewelpet partner of Angelina, challenging Ruby, Garnet and Sapphie into a cooking battle. Amelie is the shortest of all the Jewelpets and her personality is very nice and polite to others. She appears on Jewelpet Sunshine as a captain of a Pirate Group. She actually a 9th generation Pirate who inherited the name "Captain Amethyst", to protect the legendary "Rainbow Jewel". In Kira Deco, she is Goriking's servant and a supportive character for the KiraDeco team. In Happiness, she attends a Christmas Party in the Jewelpet Cafe Happiness.
| Lapis (ラピス, Rapisu) | Lapis lazuli | Russian Blue | Female | Strong Fortune (Official); Destruction of Evil (First series) | September 15 | EP 35 | Junko Takeuchi |
The Jewelpet of Strong Fortune (Destruction of Evil in the first series), Lapis is a blue Russian Blue cat who symbolizes wears a blue jewel necklace and a gold beaded bracelet. She debuted in episode 35, Lapis herself has an ability to detect evil and destroy it. But it's proven to be ineffective against Dian and became possessed by his dark magic. When becoming evil by force, she defeated King in the Jewel Games, which is the cause of his capture. Even though she was under his spell, she understands King's feelings, though she doesn't show it to him. During the events of episode 46, Dian's spell on her was broken after she realize that she cares for King, making her go to Rinko's side and helped her escape to the Human World. She and King were held captive after then but then escaped in episode 49 to help Rinko and the others. She again appeared in the epsidode 32 of Jewelpet Twinkle. Although is unknown if she once has a human partner and competed in the Jewel Star Grand Prix, Lapis is a Jewelpet who uses a Jewel Pod to read someone's fortune. But after reading Ruby's fortune, she got struck by something unknown and predicted that Ruby is super lucky, also shocked on her fortune involving a school bell. Both she and Prase knew that both Akari and Ruby share something powerful that would make them the next Jewel Stars. She appears on Jewelpet Sunshine as one of Dian's fans. Lapis also appears in Kira Deco as one of the Jewelpets who visited Sapphie's library. She also works at a bar. In Happiness, Lapis appeared alongside Tata and Chite as they try to ruin the Halloween party due to the Red Moon's influence. She was again possessed in episode 34, who then took over the Jewel Academy. But she was purified after Ruruka reminded her of her first love with the school nurse.
| Io (イオ, Io) | Iolite | Lop rabbit | Male | Refreshment | December 29 | EP 38 | Nozomi Sasaki |
The Jewelpet of Refreshment, Io is a brown lop rabbit who wears a purple bow tie. In the first series, Io is one of the Jewel Eight and was awakened by Dian's magic during the day before Christmas, who turned him evil with his jewel power, causing havoc on Earth. He was reclaimed by Rinko through the Jewel Games and converted to good once again. The unique thing about him is that he doesn't use a broomstick to fly around like the other Jewelpets, instead, he flies using his floppy ears, which serve as wings. All of his speeches ends in "Dachi". He appears again in Jewelpet Twinkle as one of the three Jewelpets who grew to massive proportions due to Sara's Magic. In Sunshine, he is in the 3rd Grade Rose Section and may have a crush on Peridot. In Kira Deco, he is one of Coal's lackeys and also an admirer to Opal, who plans on taking the Deco Stones for their master, the Dark General. He also has minor appearances in Happiness before his major role in episode 31, where he forms a Magic Gem with Nobara Kitajima. In Lady, he is the owner of a tea shop.
| Topaz (トパーズ, Topāzu) | Topaz | Yorkshire Terrier | Female | Radiance (Official); Confidence (First series) | November 12 | EP 42 | Aki Kanada |
The Jewelpet of Radiance (Confidence in the first series), Topaz is a grey and brown Yorkshire Terrier who wears a purple jewel necklace and a light purple bow. Debuting in episode 42 of the first series as a member of the Jewel Eight, Topaz became corrupted by Dian's magic, and she causes Kuranosuke to lose confidence in himself. Rinko and co. then reclaim her by going through their haunted school. Unlike the other Jewelpets, she has long hair and always speaks in a Nagoya dialect. In Twinkle, she is Hilde's Jewelpet Partner. In Sunshine, she is one of Dian's admirers. In Kira Deco, Topaz is an owner of a specialty clothing shop in Jewel Town. Very calm and sometimes mean, she is also helpful to Ruby on getting the necessary items for Pink's clothing. She also makes cameos with Flora in Lady.
| Charotte (チャロット, Charotto) | Charoite | Honeybee | Female | Challenging Spirit (Official); Confusion Removal (Twinkle) | April 3 | JPT EP 46 | MAKO |
The Jewelpet of Challenging Spirit (Confusion Removal in Twinkle), Charotte is a yellow and brown striped honeybee who wears a purple crystal bow on her head and a purple jewel necklace shaped like a flower. Appearing in episode 46 of Jewelpet Twinkle, Charotte and her partner Sagan were also candidates of in the Jewel Star Grand Prix who challenged Sara and Sapphie in the semi-finals of the competition but lose in the end, though both she and her human partner congratulated Sara and Sapphie on their win. Charotte always ends her speeches in "~Charo" and it is unknown how she and Sagan met before the Grand Prix. In Jewelpet Sunshine, she is one of the students at Jewel Land's Sunshine Academy. She is a roommate with one of Shouko's best friends and has a crush on a mosquito named Katori. She always ends her speeches in "~Cha". In Kira Deco, Charotte is a well known "Honey Hunter", who looks for her one and only crush. Though she has a crush on Midori, she later breaks up with him after seeing him flirting with other girls and blames for his bad personality and develops a crush on Retsu instead. Charotte possesses a Jewel Pod as well, used to cast magic spells. Her Jewel Flash Magic in Kira Deco allows her to shock anyone nearby. In Happiness, Charotte works as a night guard in the Jewel Academy and gets honey from Jewelina as a reward. She is also involved on Marie stealing Ruby's Magic Gem, until she worked with her to get it back to the Jewel Box.
| Larimar (ラリマー, Rarimā) | Larimar | Arctic fox | Female | Love and Peace | December 3 | LJP EP 47 | Ayahi Takagaki |
The Jewelpet of Love and Peace, Larimar is a white Arctic fox with light blue eartips who wears a snowflake Jewel Necklace, a flower scrunchie on the tail base and a bead necklace on the tip of her tail. First appearing in Lady Jewelpet, she served as Rector's mentor during her early days in the Jewel Palace, being very supportive and caring for her. But during the time after Diana and Alto ran away and Claire became Lady Jewel, she noticed her partner becoming sad that she isn't chosen. She became worried on her dive to despair and revenge that made her refuse on giving her power. This make her cut off her ties to Rector and turned back into her Jewel Form. Larimar also revealed that she is the one who asked Ruby to accept Momona as a Lady Candidate, knowing her potential to heal Jewel Land from the sorrow done by the Beasts. In Magical Change, she is one of Airi's 4 Jewelpet partners, alongside Ruby, Luna and Labra. She has dreams of becoming an idol singer. At one point, a magic mishap causes her tail to come to life, named "Shippo-san". She is also one of the 9 main Jewelpets to be based on a Pretty Cure from “KiraKira PreCure A La Mode”, in this case, Cure Waffles.

=== Magical Black Class ===
| Name | Jewel | Species | Gender | Jewel Power | Birthdate | Episode Debut | Voice Actor |
|---|---|---|---|---|---|---|---|
| Diana (ダイアナ, Daiana) | Diamond | Munchkin | Female | Charisma | April 20 | EP 4 | Rumi Shishido |
The Jewelpet of Charisma, Diana is a black Munchkin cat with white paws who wears a lace-trimmed pink waistcoat, a pink bow, and a silver heart-shaped necklace. In the first series, she serves as the main antagonist for the first half of the series. Diana is Dian's younger sister, who got sealed by the Four Great Magicians of Jewel Land many years ago due to her foolish acts. She was unsealed during the events of the second episode due to the Phantom Thieves, thinking it was the kitten they found. Her mission is to defeat the Four Witches of Jewel Land and rule both worlds by her power. Although she can be snobbish, evil and sometimes jealous to Rinko. Unlike other Jewelpets, Diana practices dark magic and can use the Dark Eyes Power (ダークアイズパワー, Dāku aizu pawā) to curse people (which can be distinguished from the black to purple colored paw on the victim), in which the Jewel Charms were hiding, which can be broken by someone confessing their weakness. Diana also has a black version of the Jewel Pocketbook which she uses to identify which Jewelpet she will receive. It was also used to unlock the Jewel Stick along with the one that Rinko has. She is technically bonded to Sage, but treats the Phantom Herb Thieves as nothing more than disposable lackeys; they follow her anyway because of her promises of a better life for them. Later, it is revealed that her purpose is to awaken her brother Dian, which she achieves in episode 33. She gets relegated to second-in-command from there on. She hates any girl who becomes too close to Dian, and her jealousy often interferes in his plans. Near the end of the series, she abandons any evil intentions after seeing what her brother has turned into, and pledges for him to go back to being his old self. In Jewelpet Twinkle, she appears along with Alma, mysteriously watching over Akari and her friend's actions. She personally appeared in front of Akari and revealed that she was created by Alma in . During the Grand Prix Arc, she and Alma survived the Battest's demise and entered the Jewel Star Grand Prix under the alias Jill (ジル, Jiru). She later sacrificed her life to save Alma after her Dark Magic gone out of control, dying onto her hands but later revived. She's shown to carry a mirror just like Garnet does. In Jewelpet Sunshine, she is a student from the 3rd Grade Rose Section. She is the idol of her class and looks down on the Plum section like nobody else. She once dated Dian and managed to get back with him from Garnet. She is also one of Luna's best friends. She also made brief appearances in Kira Deco in some episodes with her main appearance in episode 49, revealing herself to have watched over the Kira Deco 5's actions and decided to take them to Smooth Land to force the group to make her laugh. Diana also appears in Happiness as part of the rival school's cheering squad in the athletic meet.
| King (キング, Kingu) | Onyx | French Bulldog | Male | Health | August 10 | EP 7 | Hidenobu Kiuchi |
The Jewelpet of Health, King is a pink French Bulldog who wears a gold crown and a necklace shaped like a black club. In the first series, he is Genshirou's Jewelpet partner and a funny but positive character of the series. He is the least popular Jewelpet in Jewel Land, along with Diana and Dian. He has a love interest with one of the Jewel Eight, Lapis (who is under Dian's dark spell), which is the cause of his capture. When in Dian's clutches, he tags along with Diana and Dian with their plans while he tries to convince Lapis to go back to her usual self and let go of Dian's dark intentions. He and Lapis were held captive after Dian's spell on her was broken, but then escaped to help Rinko and the others during Valentine's Day. In an episode of Jewelpet Twinkle, Ruby dresses up as King. Also, King formally debuted on the Grand Prix Arc as one of the judges of the Jewel Star Grand Prix. He appears on Jewelpet Sunshine alongside Brownie and Alex, who he and his lackeys always plans on something bad to the Academy. In Kira Deco, he appears as a conspirator selling Jewel-like stuff. Usually he convinces Ruby to buy his stuff so she can make friends with Pink again. Though being a conspirator, he has a good heart and in the end, helped Ruby apologize to Pink. Although he got all of Ruby's Deco and Deco stones, he was then arrested by Labra and Angela and reclaimed Ruby's stuff back. He also makes an appearance in episode 39 where his house was destroyed by a "Boom Rock" that Ruby tossed, declaring Angela guilty until Labra attempts to prove her innocence. In Happiness, he wants to be appreciated by Machiko, who helped her on sorting out her work after they were scattered around due to accidentally bumping into each other. He becomes a victim of the Red Moon, but later got restored back to normal thanks to Chiari and co. King gets a major episode role in Magical Change, where he served as Sumire's pet dog, unaware that he is Monohime, her former dog. When she comes across a sneaky salesman, King achieves his human form and saves her from him, always wanting to protect her.
| Dian (ディアン, Dian) | Obsidian | Maine Coon | Male | Self-Control (Official); Strong Heart (Twinkle) | January 20 | EP 33 | Jun Fukuyama |
The Jewelpet of Self-Control (Strong Heart in Twinkle), Dian is a grey Maine Coon cat with white paws who wears a black round orb necklace and a black and red cape in Season One. Debuting in episode 33 of the first series as the main antagonist of the second half of the series, Dian is Diana's older brother, who can also use forbidden dark magic called Obsidian Eyes Power (オブシディアンアイズパワー, Obushidian aizu pawā). In ancient times, because he thought the humans were taking advantage of the Jewelpets' powers, he led a rebellion against the Four Great Magicians, who put a stop to it and sealed him in an iceberg on Earth. After Diana unseals him, he decides to take revenge against those who did him wrong and to try and conquer both worlds. He corrupts eight powerful Jewelpets, the Jewel Eight, and challenges Rinko to the Jewel Games, betting the Jewelpets he corrupted against Rinko herself. He desires the Jewel Stick; however, only Rinko can make use of its power. When this doesn't go as planned, he resorts to turning into Rinko's dream Prince Charming, Andy Samael (アンディ・サマエル, Andi Samaeru) in an attempt to seduce her for him to obtain the Jewel Stick. He captured Rinko due to his magic and "proposed" to her for marriage, managing to steal and corrupt the Jewel Stick. He then defeated the Four Witches, turning them into stone and planned to go to the Human World using his new dark powers. After Rinko reclaimed the Jewel Stick, he already absorbed some of its powers, however the feelings that he develops for Rinko in the process and his conflicting goals drive him insane, turning him into Dark Dian (ダークディアン, Daaku Dian). Rinko, Minami, Aoi and the Jewelpets reach into his heart and purify him, returning him to how he was before Dark Magic corrupted him. In Jewelpet Twinkle, he is Leon's Jewelpet Partner, who doesn't speak at all due to an incident that made him lose his voice. He first met Leon several years ago, in front of the gravestone of his pet dog who recently died and told him if Leon wanted to be his partner to ease his sadness. Leon accepts his offer and the two became inseparable. Usually mute, the reason is that Diana's awakening made him lose his voice until Leon found out why after he asked the Magic Mirror for answers, restoring his voice back. In Jewelpet Sunshine, he is a student in the 3rd Grade Rose Section and a TV Star. In episode 25, he noticed Garnet when she helped him mend his outfit for one of his gigs and they started dating. However, Diana, his former girlfriend, was still in love with him, and fought with Garnet over him. Garnet ended up giving up on him for Diana's sake, though he did inspire her to try harder to chase her dream of being a star. He appears a couple of times afterwards, with Diana. In Kira Deco, Dian is one of the members of the Decoranian's Four Heavenly Kings (四天王, Shiten'nō), the most highest ranking agents employed by the Dark General. He wreaked havoc into Jewel Town in episode 35, turning the denizens into cards. He then defeated Angela and Retsu in a card duel and almost obtained the Deco Stones. But he failed in the end as both Retsu and Angela defeated him head on. He usually wields a black Jewel Pod. In Happiness, he appears as an announcer in a contest and later reveals himself as a "vegetable sommelier" in episode 22, helping the girls to come out new vegetable cakes for the cafe. He is also the first Jewelpet to be the victim of the Red Moon's evil influence.
| Labra (ラブラ, Rabura) | Labradorite | Polar bear | Female | Hidden Powers (Official); Mischief (First series) | December 27 | EP 39 | Miyuki Sawashiro |
The Jewelpet of Hidden Powers (Mischief in the first series), Labra is a pink and white polar bear cub with blue heart-shaped paws and heart-shaped ears who wears a necklace shaped like a multi-colored ringed planet resembling Saturn. Originally making her debut in the first season as a baby Jewelpet born by using Rakumajo's magic, she is a genius child who has the Super Crystal Class ranking, which means that all of her magic is very successful. All of her speeches end in "~labu". In Jewelpet Twinkle, Labra is a young prankster and loves making jokes in Jewel Land, especially to Ruby, but sometimes gets scared and cries a lot, which can cause powerful magical shock-waves that can destroy anything nearby, even statues. Also, her cries can materialize giant stone projectiles that can damage anything. She became Akari's secondary Jewelpet partner after she, Akari and Ruby helped to fix Moldavite's statue. She is also seen living in Akari's house in the human world along with Ruby and sometimes doesn't want to be called a dog due to her species. She is also a bit childish and sometimes acts as Ruby's younger sister. Labra and Ruby can cast magic together with Akari during some situations in Jewel Land. In this way, she can amplify more of both Ruby and Akari's magical potential. In Jewelpet Sunshine, she is one of the students at Jewel Land's Sunshine Academy and also the youngest of the group. After she graduated 5 years later, she is now a High Class Magician working for Jewelina. She uses a Jewel Pod to cast magic. In Kira Deco, she alongside Angela are both police officers of Jewel Town, usually a patrol officer. Despite her cute looks, she is a licensed police officer who can sentence anyone in jail for more than 600 years. She also accepts high amounts of deco as bail, as shown how Pink and Blue escaped being imprisoned in jail. In Happiness, she is also one of Ruby's Friends who is given a mission to make friends and open the Jewelpet Cafe Happiness. Her job in the cafe is a waitress. She also has rivalry issues with Rosa which is later resolved in episode 2. She is also one of the 9 main Jewelpets to be based on a Pretty Cure from “KiraKira PreCure A La Mode”, in this case, Cure Pekorin.
| Granite (グラナイト, Guranaito) | Granite | White lion | Male | Security | December 1 | JPS EP 52 | Atsushi Tamaru |
The Jewelpet of Security, Granite is a white lion with a gray mane and blue ears who wears a blue jewel necklace. He debuted in the final episode of Jewelpet Sunshine, where he arrives at the bridge looking at Ruby, which at first she thought he's a different guy until she recognized him as Mikage and rushed over him, hugging and telling why he wasn't around in the last five years while crying onto his arms. He then forgives her and the two became together in the ending. Granite appears once again in Kira Deco as Ruby's dance partner and boyfriend. How Ruby met him is never explained. In Happiness, he is a space traveler who appears during the Red Moon crisis. His UFO had broken down, so Chiari and her friends had to fix it in order to get back to his usual duties. In Lady, he is a fortune teller, which Lillian and Miura attend to in their date. Granite gets a major episode role in Magical Change, where he gets struck by poisonous plants which makes him have a split personality between his normal, mild self and a suave romantic man. Granite and Ruby used to have some competition because of his nearly-perfect skills, even winning the noodle eating contest without making a mess; much to Ruby's chagrin. In the end, he gets cured by Sakutaro and leaves for places unknown.
| Coal (コール, Kōru) | Coal | Capybara | Male | Endurance | September 6 | JPKD EP 2 | Yōji Ueda |
The Jewelpet of Endurance, Coal is an ash brown capybara with brown paws who wears a black jewel necklace resembling Buddhist Prayer Beads. Debuting at the end of episode 2 of Jewelpet Kira Deco, Coal is a member of Decoranian, a group responsible on plunging the Human World into darkness using Dark Magic. Usually he is bossy but sometimes very boastful and impatient, though he keeps his cool, even around both his subordinates Io and Opal. His goal is to find the Deco Stones and give them to his shrouded master while making sure the KiraDeco 5 were out of the way. Usually he and his lackeys were always gets beaten episode by episode. In some episodes, he goes in disguise and assumes the alias Coarumi (コル美, Korumi) to spy on the main character's actions. He also has a habit of saying "yami" in many of his sentences, as well as in his laughter. Coal looks over the Dark General as his father, as the one who raised him from when he was little. But after each failure and relevance that he's not his father, he leaves Jewel Town only returning when he then saw his friends getting abused by the Dark General in his evil form and had no choice but to help them. He resumes to the form of Coarumi one more time to help the students and then revealed his true identity to his friends, sacrificing himself to stop the Dark General, which results to him dying. He was then revived in the finale after the Mirror Ball is restored. Coal himself wields a black Jewel Pod (later a cardboard one after being demoted), used to contact his master back at the Human World while casting dark magic clouds to his enemies. In Happiness, he works as a spa massager and therapist, who tries to massage Master's strained arm. He then had his formal appearance in episode 37, on where he found Yumiko's doll Dorothy in the playground and took it, not knowing it was corrupted by the Red Moon's Magic.
| Luea (ルーア, Rūa) | Blue apatite | Dutch rabbit | Female | Truth | August 28 | LJP EP 1 | Yuka Iguchi |
The Jewelpet of Truth, Luea is a female black and white Dutch rabbit with heart markings below her left eye and left leg. She wears an indigo butterfly hair clip and a chain of indigo roses on her neck. Debuting in the first episode of Lady Jewelpet, Luea is the Jewelpet partner of Lillian, one of the Lady Jewel Candidates. She is shown to be very posh yet ladylike like her partner, though sometimes sharp-tongued and held her pride up against other candidates. She also boasts her own partnership with Lillian and also shown to be supportive towards her. Although said, she is also very competitive against everyone and will do anything to eradicate Momona and Ruby out of the scene for the title of Lady Jewel. Luea also hates how Ruby misses the point on what she said and always likes to be petted by Lillian. In the later parts of the series, it's revealed that she has a mysterious past after Lillian found the Music Box during one of the Lady Exams, with her human partner crucially linked to it. It's later revealed that she was Lady Diana's Mentor, and she left her due that she loved Alto, leading her to bring the doll she has to life into Lillian. Luea also secretly works for the mysterious person, Joker. In Magical Change, she is Laura Fukuōji's partner and will do anything to transform herself into a human. She eventually gets the chance to do so in episode 23. At the end of the series, she becomes crowned as the Queen of Jewel Land. She is also one of the 9 main Jewelpets to be based on a Pretty Cure from “KiraKira PreCure A La Mode”, in this case, Cure Macaron.

== Sweetspets ==
First debuting in the end of 2011, Sweetspets (スウィーツペット, Suwītsupetto) are a distant relative to the Jewelpets which are animals based entirely on desserts. Like the Jewelpets themselves, they share the same body size and aesthetics but differs due to the lack of Jewel Eyes and instead having some body parts made of sweets. All of the Sweetspets hail from Sweets Land, a country where everything is made of desserts and confectioneries.

They are also magicians, able to cast a magic spell called Sweets Flash and have an ability to regenerate their lost body parts on their bodies. It is explained in Jewelpet the Movie: Sweets Dance Princess that the regeneration ability is because of the Sweetspets getting their powers from the legendary Candy Tower, where all Sweetspets are born.

| Name | Sweet | Species | Gender | Birthdate | Episode Debut | Voice Actor |
|---|---|---|---|---|---|---|
| Sakuran (さくらん, Sakuran) | Sakuramochi | Brown bear | Female | March 19 | JPS EP 38 | Rina Hidaka |
A Sweetspet made of sakuramochi, Sakuran is a pink brown bear who has leaf decorations on her head and wears a Jewel Necklace with a cherry blossom pattern in it. Usually visiting Jewel Land every Christmas Eve, she is appointed on bringing gifts to the denizens of Jewel Land every year. Her speeches ends with "~mochi" and is sometimes an airhead, not knowing on what to do until Ruby and her friends helped her. Unlike all Jewelpets, she doesn't have an associating Jewel Power but she has the power to regenerate her missing body parts and detach one them to share her sweets to others (like detaching her ear and giving it to Ruby to recover her strength). In Kira Deco, Sakuran is a tourist Sweetspet who visits Jewel Town for the annual Tanabata festival, though she has a problem with her crystallizing body. Sakuran plays a more prominent role in Sweets Dance Princess as one of the Sweetspets who befriended Paku. Sakuran also appears in Happiness in one episode as she assists the pets to set up the Sweets Festival. She is also part of the three idol group GoKuRo-san Trio, alongside Sango and Rosa.
| Melorina (メロリーナ, Merorīna) | Melonpan | Poodle | Female | April 12 | JPS EP 38 | Asuka Ōgame |
Melorina is a female poodle dog Sweetspet made of melonpan. Melorina is a poodle dog whose fur is light cream with a bun pattern on her forehead. Her ears and tail are made out of light lime melonpan, and she has light magenta eyes. She wears green melon earrings and a garland of melonpan around her neck. She debuted in the end of episode 38 during the Christmas Party after Ruby's friends saved Sakuran's life. She gets a minor role in both Kira Deco and Sweets Dance Princess.
| Eclan (エクレン, Ekuren) | Eclair | Rex rabbit | Female | January 24 | JPS EP 38 | Chiwa Saito |
A Sweetspet made of eclair, Eclan is a tan and brown rex rabbit with eclair ears, hands and tail and a pink heart with brown patterns on its tummy who wears a heart shaped jewel necklace. She debuted in the end of episode 38 during the Christmas Party after Ruby's friends saved Sakuran's life. She gets a minor role in Kira Deco but plays a more prominent role in Sweets Dance Princess as one of the Sweetspets who befriended Paku. Eclan is usually smart around the other Sweetspets, though she is sometimes very full of herself and often mean. However, she can be very nice to others.
| Macaronia (マカロニア, Makaronia) | Macaron | Holland Lop | Female | June 9 | JPS EP 38 | Miyu Matsuki |
A Sweetspet made of macaron, Macaronia is a white and light pink Holland Lop rabbit with long, floppy ears that has bashful pink tips and pink inner ears, magenta and periwinkle eyes and a light pink macaron tail. She wears a pink frilly cap on her head with a cherry on top and an indigo necklace with a green macaron on it. She debuted in the end of episode 38 during the Christmas Party after Ruby's friends saved Sakuran's life. She gets a minor role in both Kira Deco and Sweets Dance Princess.
| Donadona (ドナドナ, Donadona) | Doughnut | Golden hamster | Male | January 15 | JPS EP 38 | Saki Fujita |
A Sweetspet made of doughnuts, Donadona is a brown golden hamster with a white belly, doughnut-like ears and tail and has several doughnuts on its limbs who wears a doughnut jewel necklace. He debuted in the end of episode 38 during the Christmas Party after Ruby's friends saved Sakuran's life. He gets a minor role in Kira Deco but plays a more prominent role in Sweets Dance Princess as one of the Sweetspets who befriended Paku.
| Honey (ハニー, Hanī) | Honey waffles | Flying squirrel | Female | November 28 | JPS EP 38 | Aina Matsufuji |
A Sweetspet made of honey waffles, Honey is a yellow flying squirrel with a waffle-like hat, wing flaps and tail who wears a yellow ribbon. She debuted in the end of episode 38 during the Christmas Party after Ruby's friends saved Sakuran's life. She gets a minor role in Kira Deco and Sweets Dance Princess.
| Purinki (プリンキー, Purinkī) | Crème caramel | Common squirrel monkey | Female | August 31 | JPS EP 38 | Moe Mukai |
A Sweetspet made of crème caramel, Purinki is a female common squirrel monkey with a cream-yellow head with brown caramel dripping down, cream-yellow face, hands and feet, light lime body, a brown tail and green-colored eyes. For her attire, she wears two cherries on the top of her head, two red crescent earrings and a white pearl necklace with two bananas attached around her neck. She debuted in the end of episode 38 during the Christmas Party after Ruby's friends saved Sakuran's life. She gets a minor role in Kira Deco and Sweets Dance Princess. She always adds "Puri" at the end of her sentences.
| Chocola (ショコラ, Shokora) | Chocolate ice cream | Asian black bear | Female | June 3 | JPS EP 38 | Marie Miyake |
A Sweetspet made of chocolate ice cream, Chocola is a brown Asian black bear with ice cream-like ears and brown fluff on its chest, legs and tail who wears an orange candy jewel necklace. She debuted in the end of episode 38 during the Christmas Party after Ruby's friends saved Sakuran's life. She gets a minor role in Kira Deco and has a more major role in Sweets Dance Princess as one of the Duke's advisers.
| Mako (マコ, Mako) | Pink macaron | Roborovski hamster | Female | November 11 | JPS EP 38 | MAKO |
Mako is a female Roborovski hamster Sweetspet made of pink macaron. Mako is a light pink Roborovski hamster with cream hair, pink eyes, pink macaron ears and body. For her attire, she wears a light blue bow that holds up her hair and a blue beaded necklace with a pink heart-shaped jewel attached around her neck. She debuted in the end of episode 38 during the Christmas Party after Ruby's friends saved Sakuran's life. She gets a minor role in Kira Deco and has a more major role in Sweets Dance Princess as one of the Duke's advisers.
| Roko (ロコ, Roko) | Orange macaron | Roborovski hamster | Female | November 11 | JPS EP 38 | Asuka Ōgame |
Roko is a female Roborovski hamster Sweetspet made of orange macaron. Roko is a light orange Roborovski hamster with orange macaron ears and body and has orange-red colored eyes along with lighter orange cream hair. For her attire, she wears two pink flowers that hold her hair in place and a blue beaded necklace with an orange-red diamond-shaped jewel attached around her neck. She debuted in the end of episode 38 during the Christmas Party after Ruby's friends saved Sakuran's life. She gets a minor role in Kira Deco and has a more major role in Sweets Dance Princess as one of the Duke's advisers.
| Kako (カコ, Kako) | Green macaron | Roborovski hamster | Male | November 11 | JPS EP 38 | Marie Miyake |
Kako is a male Roborovski hamster Sweetspet made of green macaron. Kako is a light cream Roborovski hamster with lime green macaron ears and body, green eyes and cream hair. He wears a blue pearl necklace with a green spade-shaped jewel attached around his neck. He debuted in the end of episode 38 during the Christmas Party after Ruby's friends saved Sakuran's life. He gets a minor role in Kira Deco and has a more major role in Sweets Dance Princess as one of the Duke's advisers.
| Koron (コロン, Koron) | Brown macaron | Roborovski hamster | Male | November 11 | JPS EP 38 | Saki Fujita |
Koron is a male Roborovski hamster Sweetspet made of brown macaron. Koron is a tan Roborovski hamster with caramel brown macaron ears and body. He has brown eyes and cream hair and wears a blue pearl necklace with a brown club-shaped jewel attached around his neck. He debuted in the end of episode 38 during the Christmas Party after Ruby's friends saved Sakuran's life. He gets a minor role in Kira Deco and has a more major role in Sweets Dance Princess as one of the Duke's advisers.
| Gumimin (グミミン, Gumimin) | Gummy candy | Fennec fox | Male | May 30 | Sweets Dance Princess | Yumiko Kobayashi |
A Sweetspet made of gummy candy, Gumimin is a light cream fennec fox with gummy candy parts on his body, especially his ears and his collar. He first mysteriously appeared from the skies during Princess Mana's cake cutting ceremony. In reality, he is sent by the Duke to thwart the party in the castle. On the failed attempt, He starts to develop good friendships with the Jewelpets and Sweetspets and thinks of Ruby as his big sister. He suffers from amnesia and has no recollection on who he is, so he is named Paku (パクくん, Paku-kun) by his friends. He tends to be airheaded and also likes all types of sweets, but also wants to be supportive to Ruby. The Duke knew that he is the Legendary Sweetspet, which he has the power to either destroy or save Sweetsland. However, when his memories were reawakened, he goes on a rampage to destroy Sweetsland until he remembers Ruby and the others. He plans to sacrifice himself to save Sweetsland using his body, but Ruby and her friends purified him with the Jewel Sweets Flash to save him and the entire country in the process, reverting him back to his original form.

== Other pets ==
There are some pet characters who are not officially classified as a Jewelpet or a Sweetspet.

| Name | Species | Gender | Birthdate | Episode Debut | Voice Actor |
|---|---|---|---|---|---|
| Nachi (ナッチ, Natchi) | Probably Fly | Female | Unknown | JPS EP 29 | Ayane Sakura |
Nachi is a pet with jewel eyes and fly wings. She only appeared in the 29th episode of the Sunshine anime, revealed to be a childhood friend of Charotte before she met Shouko. She has two little purple jewels on top of her eyes, and between them a big pink jewel right at the middle of her forehead. After meeting Charotte again, Charotte discovered that there are more pets of Nachi's kind, all convincing Nachi to accuse her for ruining a desk that they destroyed. Nachi revealed to only be manipulating her for taking her role as the class representative, breaking Charotte's heart and making her anti-social until changing back after meeting Shouko for the first time.
| Lolip (ロリップ, Rorippu) | Rabbit | Female | Unknown | The Fuss in The Jewel Festival | N/A |
Lolip is a light pink floppy-eared rabbit with strawberry candy eyes, wearing a pink frilly cap and a pink lollipop-shaped jewel necklace. She only appeared in the light novel as the main protagonist, who first arrived at Jewel Land, meeting Ruby and her friends as they all set up the Jewel Festival and when they learned that she cannot use any type of magic, they initially doubt whether she is a Jewelpet or not. Shown to be clumsy and very accident-prone, she tries to correct her own mistakes and learn from them. Later on in the story, she started to develop a strong friendship with Ruby and her friends and discovering her true identity on why she can't use magic. At the end of the story, she opens a candy shop named "Happy Drop". Her name might either refer to her lollipop shaped jewel necklace or herself being a pet whose eyes are made of lollipops, a giveaway to her identity as Sweetspet. However the novel's author, Hiroko Kanasugi conceived her concept for the novel way before the Sweetspets' debut in the franchise in 2011.

== See also ==
- Jewelpet
