= Killing Me / Killing You =

Japanese manga series

- First tankōbon volume cover
- Genre: Adventure
- Manga
- Written by: Imomushi Narita
- Published by: Fujimi Shobo
- English publisher: NA: Seven Seas Entertainment
- Imprint: Dragon Comics Age
- Magazine: Young Dragon Age
- Original run: September 25, 2017 – August 28, 2023
- Volumes: 5

Killing Me / Killing You (stylized in all caps) is a Japanese manga series written and illustrated by Imomushi Narita. It was serialized in Fujimi Shobo's seinen manga magazine Young Dragon Age from September 2017 to August 2023.

== Plot ==
The series is centered around the immortality of two characters, Meteor and Youthanesia. When a meteorite strikes Earth, it sinks the planet into chaos with some humans turning into monsters and others becoming immortal. Meteor is a human girl who meets Youthanesia, a large monster, and together the two have the shared desire to die.

== Characters ==
Meteor (ミーティア, Mītia)
Voiced by: Hiromi Igarashi (PV)
Youthanesia (ユースアネイジア, Yūsuaneijia)
Voiced by: Wataru Usami (PV)

== Media ==
=== Manga ===
Written and illustrated by Imomushi Narita, Killing Me / Killing You was serialized in Fujimi Shobo's seinen manga magazine Young Dragon Age from September 25, 2017, to August 28, 2023. Its chapters were collected into tankōbon volumes released from October 19, 2018, to September 8, 2023.

In June 2025, Seven Seas Entertainment announced that they had licensed the series for English publication beginning in April 2026.

| No. | Original release date | Original ISBN | North American release date | North American ISBN |
|---|---|---|---|---|
| 1 | October 19, 2018 | 978-4-04-072877-3 | April 21, 2026 | 979-8-89765-273-0 |
1. "Waterfall Styx"; 2. "The Dragon of Death: El Cielo"; 3. "Doomsday Mansion"; 4. "Mysteria & Green Eyes"; Interludes 1–4
| 2 | October 9, 2019 | 978-4-04-073356-2 | July 21, 2026 | 979-8-89765-274-7 |
5. "Whistling at Dawn"; 6. "The Gashlycrumb Bandits: Or, After the Outing"; 7. "Under the Cherry Blossoms in Full Bloom"; 8. "In a Normal Place / The Sacrament of Judgement"; Interlude 5
| 3 | October 9, 2020 | 978-4-04-073838-3 | November 10, 2026 | 979-8-89765-275-4 |
9. "Vampire in Ghost Town"; 10. "A Useless Tale"; 11. "Memories: Dreams of Bubbles Across the Horizon"; 12. "Burial at Sea: Returning to the Bubbles Across the Horizon"; Interlude 6
| 4 | August 9, 2023 | 978-4-04-075044-6 | February 2, 2027 | 979-8-89765-573-1 |
| 5 | September 8, 2023 | 978-4-04-075046-0 | June 1, 2027 | 979-8-89765-616-5 |

=== Other ===
An animated promotional video was released on November 20, 2020. The PV is personally animated by Narita, and featured voiceover performances from Hiromi Igarashi and Wataru Usami.

== Reception ==
The series was one of 50 nominees for the sixth Next Manga Awards in the print category in 2020.

== See also ==
- It's My Life, another manga series by the same creator
