= Yūichi Iguchi =

Japanese voice actor (born 1981)

- 井口 祐一
- Born: February 22, 1981 (age 45); Tokyo, Japan
- Other name: Yuuma Aoi (蒼井夕真)
- Occupation: Voice actor
- Agent: Haikyo
- Notable credit(s): DRAMAtical Murder as Sei; Spiritpact as You Keika

Yūichi Iguchi (井口 祐一, Iguchi Yuuichi) (born June 22, 1981) is a Japanese voice actor from Tokyo, Japan. He is affiliated with Haikyo.

== Filmography ==
=== Anime ===
- Onegai My Melody Kirara (2008) – Hiroshi
- Kannagi (2008) – Male Guest
- Jewelpet (2009) – Senpō
- Tatakau Shisho: The Book of Bantorra (2009) – Ronkeny
- Fairy Tail (2009–present) – Max Alors, Kawazu
- Chu-Bra!! (2010) – Male student
- Durarara!! (2010) – Kanazawa
- Big Windup! (2010) – Jun Furusawa (Summer Tournament)
- Jewelpet (2010–12) – Nix (Twinkle, Sunshine, Kira☆Deco)
- Lilpri (2010) – Various characters
- Mayoi Neko Overrun! (2010) – Student
- Mitsudomoe (2010–11) – Gachi Black
- Highschool of the Dead (2010) – Male student
- Wandering Son (2011) – Makoto Ariga
- Beyblade: Metal Fusion (2011) – Stray Blader
- Sket Dance (2011) – Masatoshi Kosaka
- Yu-Gi-Oh! Zexal (2011) – Fuya Okudaira
- Battle Spirits: Heroes (2011) – Various characters
- Cross Fight B-Daman (2011) – Asuka Kamiogi
- Ben-To (2011) – Hiroaki Uchimoto
- High School D×D (2012–15) – Genshiro Saji (3 seasons)
- The Familiar of Zero F (2012) – Doudou
- The Knight in the Area (2012) – Sakurai studies
- Lagrange: The Flower of Rin-ne (2012) – Sōta Serizawa (2 seasons, OVA)
- Place to Place (2012) – Male student
- Sengoku Collection (2012) – Staff
- Dusk Maiden of Amnesia (2012) – Male student
- Sakamichi no Apollon (2012) – Boy
- Hyōka (2012) – Occult Research staff
- Campione! (2012) – Sorimachi, Student B
- My Little Monster (2012) – Shimoyanagi
- Hidamari Sketch × Honeycomb (2012) – Various characters
- JoJo's Bizarre Adventure (2012) – Boy
- Little Busters! (2012) – Student
- Bakuman. (2012) – Shun Shiratori (season 3)
- Joshiraku (2013) – Doctor OVA
- The Devil Is a Part-Timer! (2013–22) – Mitsuki Sarue (Sariel) (2 seasons)
- Oreimo (2013) – Kōki Mikagami
- Stella Women's Academy, High School Division Class C³ (2013) – Daishichi Hamakaze
- Code Geass: Akito the Exiled (2013–16) – Simon Mericourt OVA
- Gaist Crusher (2013) – Hayato Kongōji
- Swing Out Sisters (2014) Yuuta (OVA; credited as Akagawa Tomato)
- Marvel Disk Wars: The Avengers (2014) – Hikaru Akatsuki
- The Kawai Complex Guide to Manors and Hostel Behavior (2014) – Kazunari Usa
- DRAMAtical Murder (2014) – Sei
- Log Horizon (2014) – Quon (season 2)
- When Supernatural Battles Became Commonplace (2014) – Yanagi Akutagawa
- Cute High Earth Defense Club LOVE! (2015) – Masuya Tazawa
- Durarara!!x2 (2015) – Kanazawa, Yatabe
- The Asterisk War (2015–16) – Silas Norman 2 seasons
- Tanaka-kun Is Always Listless (2016) – Kato
- Ozmafia!! (2016) – Soh
- Danganronpa 3: The End of Hope's Peak High School (2016) – Various characters
- Touken Ranbu: Hanamaru (2016) – Hotarumaru
- Descending Stories: Showa Genroku Rakugo Shinju (2017) – Kotaro
- Spiritpact (2017) – Keika You
- ACCA: 13-Territory Inspection Dept. (2017) – Danlin
- Sakurada Reset (2017) – Yōsuka Sakagami
- Record of Grancrest War (2018) – Alexis Doucet
- Kono Oto Tomare! Sounds of Life (2019) – Kouta Mizuhara
- Beastars (2019) – Kibi
- The Case Files of Jeweler Richard (2020) – Haruyoshi Shimomura
- Shadowverse (2020–present) – Maura Aberald
- Healin' Good Pretty Cure (2020–21) – Michio Masuko
- I-Chu: Halfway Through the Idol (2021) – Kanata Minato

=== Tokusatsu ===
- Kamen Rider Ex-Aid (2017) – Gatton Bugster. (Ep. 19, 24, 34)

=== Drama CDs ===
- Rose of Versailles (2010) – Charles

=== Video games ===
- Lucky Dog 1 (2009) – Giulio di Bondone (PC Adult, as Yuuma Aoi)
- Tokimeki Memorial Girl's Side: 3rd Story (2010) – Kasuga (春日太陽) (DS, Also premium in 2012)
- Durarara!! 3way standoff (2010) – Koji Yatabe (谷田部浩二) (PSP)
- Secret Game Code:Revise (2011) – Shiji Mitsurinori (三ツ林司) (PC Adult, as Yuuma Aoi, also 2nd Stage in 2013)
- With God Kimi (2011) – Foreigner Reiko (水庭苓)(PSP)
- If My Heart Had Wings series (2012–16) – Masatsugu Tasaki(PC Adult, as Yuuma Aoi)
- Ozmafia!! (2013) – Soh (also vivace in 2015)
- Arcana Famiglia 2 (2013) – Elmo (エルモ) (PSP)
- Gaist Crusher (2013) – Hayato Konkōji (DS, also God in 2014)
- MapleStory (2013) – Will
- Age 12: Honto no Kimochi (2014) – Kazuma Hiyama (DS)
- Touken Ranbu (2015) – Hotarumaru
- Langrisser Re:Incarnation Tensei (2015) – Yoa Yuten (DS)
- The Asterisk War (2016) – Silas Norman
- Genshin Impact (2022) – Shikanoin Heizou, Teppei
- Xenoblade Chronicles 3 (2022) – Mwamba
- Fuga: Melodies of Steel 2 (2023) – Britz Strudel
