= Ayaka Saitō =

Japanese actress (born 1988)

- 齋藤 彩夏
- Born: 2 June 1988 (age 38); Tokyo, Japan
- Occupations: Actress; voice actress
- Years active: 1992–present
- Agent: Aoni Production
- Notable work: Fruits Basket as Momiji Sohma; Genki Genki Nontan as Nontan; Girls Bravo as Tomoka Rana Judo; Jewelpet as Ruby; Witchy PreCure! as Mofurun; Ouran High School Host Club as Mitsukuni Haninozuka
- Height: 157.5 cm (5 ft 2 in)

Ayaka Saitō (齋藤 彩夏, Saitō Ayaka; born 2 June 1988) is a Japanese actress, voice actress, and comedienne formerly employed by Vocal before transferring to remax. She is best known for voicing Momiji Sohma in Fruits Basket, Tomoka Rana Jude in Girls Bravo, Mitsukuni Haninozuka in Ouran High School Host Club, and Ruby in the Jewelpet franchise.

Saitō has great respect for her Ouran co-star Maaya Sakamoto, and calls the older lady "Onee-sama" (お姉さま), a very respectful way of saying "elder sister"). On 31 December 2015, Saitō announced that she left Vocal company. On 1 August 2019, it was announced that Saitō left Remax to join Aoni Production.

== Filmography ==
=== Anime television ===
- Boogiepop Phantom as Akane Kojima (Phantom)
- Brigadoon: Marin & Melan as Moe Kisaragi
- Eden of the East as Micchon (Mikuru Katsuhara)
- Fruits Basket as Momiji Sohma
- Futari wa Pretty Cure Splash Star as Minori Hyūga
- Future Card Buddyfight X as Chibi Panda
- Genki Genki Nontan as Nontan
- Girls Bravo as Tomoka Rana Judo
- Honey and Clover as Hasegawa Megumi (ep 4)
- InuYasha as Mayu
- Jewelpet as Ruby
- Jewelpet: Magical Change as Ruby
- Jubei-chan: The Secret of the Lovely Eyepatch as Otome Shirahatamaru
- Jubei-chan 2: The Counter Attack of Siberian Yagyu as Ayunosuke Odago
- Kamisama Kiss as Botanmaru
- Kochira Katsushika-ku Kameari Kōen-mae Hashutsujo as Lemon Giboshi
- Kodocha as Mariko Sakai
- Lady Jewelpet as Ruby
- Legendz: Tale of the Dragon Kings as Zuou (Bigfoot)
- Minami-ke as Hitomi
- Mushishi as Watahiko (ep 21)
- Ojamajo Doremi as Sayaka
- Ouran High School Host Club as Haninozuka Mitsukuni (Honey)
- Pokémon as Marissa, Togekiss, Bellossom
- Queen's Blade as Ymir
- School Babysitters as Takuma Mamizuka and Umi Mamizuka
- Soul Eater as Angela Leon
- Sugar Sugar Rune as Waffle
- You're Under Arrest as Megumi Honda
- Ojarumaru as Bin-chan
- One Piece as Chome, Ronja
- Witchy Pretty Cure! as Mofurun
- Witchy Pretty Cure!! Mirai Days as Mofurun

=== Anime films ===
- Crayon Shin-chan: The Kasukabe Boys of the Evening Sun (movie 12) as Tsubaki
- Hutch the Honeybee as Hutch
- Zatch Bell! (movie 2) as 4th generation Vulcan
- Toire no Hanako-san (movie) as Hanako-san
- Jewelpet the Movie: Sweets Dance Princess (2012) as Ruby
- Pretty Cure All Stars: Singing with Everyone Miraculous Magic! (2016) as Mofurun
- Witchy Pretty Cure! The Movie: Wonderous! Cure Mofurun! (2016) as Mofurun / Cure Mofurun
- Pretty Cure Dream Stars! (2017) as Mofurun
- Kirakira Pretty Cure a la Mode the Movie: Crisply! The Memory of Mille-feuille! (2017) as Mofurun
- Pretty Cure Super Stars! (2018) as Mofurun
- Hug! Pretty Cure Futari wa Pretty Cure: All Stars Memories (2018) as Mofurun
- Jewelpet Attack Travel! (2022) as Ruby
- Wonderful Pretty Cure! The Movie: A Grand Adventure in a Thrilling Game World! (2024) as Mofurun

=== Video games ===
- Ar tonelico Qoga: Knell of Ar Ciel as Teppo
- Ouran High School Host Club as Mitsukuni Haninozuka (Honey)
- Tokimeki Memorial Girl's Side as young Kei Hazuki
- PlayStation All Stars Battle Royale as Fat Princess
- Sakura Taisen 5 as Rikaritta Aries*
- Super Smash Bros. series as Bellossom
- Little Witch Academia: Chamber of Time as Molly McIntyre
- Arknights as Vermeil

=== Others ===
- Azumanga Web Daioh (ONA) as Chiyo Mihama
- Blue Submarine No. 6 (OVA) as Mei Ling Huang
- Dai Mahou Touge (OVA) as Pyun
- Grrl Power (OVA) as Sora
