= Onidere =

Japanese manga series

- First tankōbon volume cover, featuring Saya Ikushima (front) and Tadashi Imamoto (left)

オニデレ
- Genre: Romantic comedy
- Manga
- Written by: Crystal na Yōsuke
- Published by: Shogakukan
- Imprint: Shōnen Sunday Comics
- Magazine: Weekly Shōnen Sunday
- Original run: April 2, 2008 – February 16, 2011
- Volumes: 11
- icon

Onidere (オニデレ) is a Japanese manga series written and illustrated by Crystal na Yōsuke. It was serialized in Shogakukan's shōnen manga magazine Weekly Shōnen Sunday from April 2008 to February 2011, with its chapters collected in 11 tankōbon volumes.

== Plot ==
Tadashi Imamoto, a second-year junior high student, excels at knitting as a devoted handicraft club member. He maintains a secret romantic relationship with Saya, leader of a notorious all-girl gang, who threatens mutual destruction if their affair is discovered. As their relationship develops, the dynamic shifts noticeably toward Tadashi, with Saya becoming increasingly overwhelmed by affection—to the point of fainting and nosebleeds at mere thoughts of his attention.

== Characters ==
Saya Ikushima (育島 紗夜, Ikushima Saya)
Saya Angelica Ikushima (育島・アンジェリカ・紗夜, Ikushima Anjerika Saya), known as Demon Head Saya (鬼頭のサヤ, Onigashira no Saya), leads the all-female delinquent gang Onigashira (鬼頭; lit. 'Demon Head'), and ranks among the prefecture's most notorious troublemakers. Despite her fearsome reputation and superhuman strength, she secretly harbors romantic feelings for Tadashi, adopting a timid personality in private moments with him. To spend more time with Tadashi without compromising her gang image, she creates an alternate identity as Angie, a first-year arts student. Unaware that Tadashi recognizes her disguise, she believes she has accidentally created a love triangle. The daughter of a wealthy electronics executive, Saya comes from considerable privilege but maintains strained relations with her father.
Tadashi Imamoto (今元 正, Imamoto Tadashi)
Tadashi, a second-year junior high student, excels at knitting and creates stuffed animals as a member of the handicraft club. Despite reluctantly becoming vice-president of the school council, he diligently assists the physically weak president Saki. He maintains a secret romantic relationship with gang leader Saya, whom he describes as tough yet kindhearted. Though initially intimidated by Saya, Tadashi grew to deeply admire her determination and protective nature. He proves equally devoted, safeguarding their relationship while openly expressing his affection when describing her to others.

=== Onigashira ===
Yuna Suzune (鈴音 由那, Suzune Yuna)
Yuna, a member of the Onigashira gang, wears distinctive samurai attire and an eyepatch (though her eye remains undamaged). She wields twin bokutō swords, gifted by her brother, displaying exceptional skill with the practice swords. Fiercely protective of Saya, Yuna maintains a tomboyish persona despite secretly desiring to appear more feminine—a contradiction that often leads to violent outbursts when her girlish side surfaces. She develops feelings for the Student Council President after he defends her femininity, though she responds to these emotions with physical aggression. Yuna joined the gang after witnessing Saya's strength, hoping to train under her to defeat her cross-dressing brother, who surpasses her in combat ability despite his feminine appearance and plans to transform their family dojo.
Mitsuki Asobiya (遊屋 三月, Asobiya Mitsuki)
A 14-year-old girl with a childlike appearance, she possesses exceptional guerrilla warfare skills. Obsessed with Saya, she frequently seeks physical contact and displays inappropriate affection. She wields a bear-headed toy hammer that transforms into a scythe during combat. Her bear costume grants ursine abilities. After receiving a handmade stuffed bear from Tadashi, whom she nicknames "Nice-moto", she becomes the first Onigashira member to befriend a male. Her aristocratic mannerisms and the honorific ōjō-sama suggest possible wealth or yakuza connections.
Momo Akitsuka (秋塚 百々, Akitsuka Momo)
Momo serves as the group's spy, communicating only through voice mimicry while concealing her face with a bandanna. She wields a chained, two-pronged sword and maintains a relaxed demeanor. A former member of the Haō-sō gang where she held the title "Vermillion Bird of the South", she initially infiltrated Onigashira to assassinate Saya but ultimately betrayed Haō-sō after developing genuine friendships. Her insider knowledge compromises Saya and Tadashi's secret relationship. Under the alias Sumomo, she potentially infiltrates the student council, though only Saki recognizes her true identity. The narrative suggests possible romantic feelings for Tadashi.

=== Student council ===
Tomeo Kinoshita (木下 留男, Kinoshita Tomeo)
Tomeo, the eccentric school council president, has "rehabilitated" 999 delinquents by forcibly altering their appearances to match his ideal student standards. Claiming immortality through his absolute justice belief, this power fails when he recognizes his own faults, causing lightning to strike him. He worships a strange "J"-marked statue as his justice deity. Despite his fanatical methods and poor judgment, he demonstrates surprising perceptiveness, immediately identifying Yuna's cross-dressing brother and supporting Yuna's femininity. His selection of unpopular Tadashi as vice-president and his own rule-breaking long white hair highlight his contradictory nature. Though surrounded by evil spirits and often misguided, his academic perfection and occasional insights reveal unexpected depth.
Saki Nijinose (虹ノ瀬 咲, Nijinose Saki)
Saki is the student council treasurer and principal's granddaughter. She obsessively tracks financial costs, including damages caused by the gang. Despite her frail physical condition, she exhibits sudden bursts of terrifying anger while unconsciously reverting to her grandmother's dialect. As the council's only competent member, students frequently seek her assistance rather than the president. Her dependence on Tadashi's help due to her weakness develops into romantic feelings, causing others to assume they are dating. This motivates her to join the Handicraft Club under disguise, paralleling Saya's similar actions.
Shū Yamata (夜又 修, Yamata Shū)
The student council secretary maintains a mysterious demeanor while carrying what appears to be a cross-shaped sword (actually a radish). As a self-proclaimed spirit hunter, he joined the council primarily to exorcise evil spirits surrounding the president, frequently attacking him with household items as purification tools. His spiritual cleansing methods demonstrate exceptional domestic skills, earning Tadashi's praise as a potential househusband. He possesses extensive money-saving knowledge and typically appears suddenly when spirits manifest, spending most time performing exorcisms throughout the school.

=== Haō-sō ===
The Haō-sō (覇王巣; lit. 'The One Supreme King') is a rival gang seeking to overthrow the Onigashira. Their members wear animal helmets representing Chinese constellations and initially sent Momo to infiltrate and assassinate Saya, though she ultimately defects. Aware of Saya and Tadashi's relationship through Momo, they attempt to control all school gangs by opposing mixed-gender education, possibly due to their own difficulties interacting with the opposite sex. The group eventually disbands after resolving these interpersonal issues.

Amane Tastumi (辰巳 天音, Tastumi Amane) / Tenryū (天竜, 'Heavenly Dragon')
The leader of Haō-sō wears a dragon-themed helmet that impairs his vision, often causing him to face the wrong direction. His extreme gynophobia causes profuse sweating around women, stemming from being rejected by a girlfriend who chose friends over him—a claim later verified by Aoi. Though resembling Saya, he attempts to separate her from Tadashi while struggling with his phobia, which inexplicably does not affect former teammates Aoi and Momo. The student council appoints him vice-vice president after he quells disturbances (actually caused by his own gang), though he frequently considers resigning due to difficulties working near Saki. His name is a pun off his title, as tatsu (竜) means dragon in Japanese.
Akito Toraya (虎野 秋人, Toraya Akito) / Ko Ō (虎王; 'Tiger King')
Toraya, the second-in-command of Haō-sō, wears a tiger helmet and stands as the group's tallest member. He initially exhibits extreme reactions to female contact, entering a frenzied state until subdued by Tatsumi. Though Student Council President Tomeo mistakenly believes Toraya dates Yuna after one such incident, he eventually overcomes this condition and interacts normally with women. His name is a pun off his title, as tora (虎) means tiger in Japanese.
Aoi Kamehiro (亀広 葵, Kamehiro Aoi) / Kōkaku (甲角; 'Armored Horn')
Aoi, the fourth Haō-sō member, wears a tortoise-themed helmet. Originally from Akita Prefecture, she violently reacts when boys hear her regional dialect. Unlike other females, she does not trigger Tatsumi's gynophobia due to their teammate status, though physical contact causes Akito to develop feelings for her. Having adopted more urban mannerisms, she eventually leaves the gang. Her name is a pun off her title, as kame (亀) means turtle in Japanese.

== Publication ==
Written and illustrated by Crystal na Yōsuke, Onidere was serialized in Shogakukan's shōnen manga magazine Weekly Shōnen Sunday from April 2, 2008, to February 16, 2011. Shogakukan collected its chapters in eleven tankōbon volumes, released from September 18, 2008, to May 18, 2011.

=== Volumes ===
No.	Japanese release date	Japanese ISBN
1	September 18, 2008	978-4-09-121470-6
2	December 18, 2008	978-4-09-121520-8
3	March 18, 2009	978-4-09-121616-8
4	July 17, 2009	978-4-09-121716-5
5	October 16, 2009	978-4-09-121789-9
6	February 18, 2010	978-4-09-122165-0
7	July 16, 2010	978-4-09-122474-3
8	November 18, 2010	978-4-09-122669-3
9	February 18, 2011	978-4-09-122789-8
10	May 18, 2011	978-4-09-122879-6
11	May 18, 2011	978-4-09-122880-2

== See also ==
- Love Is Like a Cocktail, a web manga series by the same author
- Otokonoko Zuma, a web manga series by the same author
