= It's My Life (manga) =

Japanese manga series

- First tankōbon volume cover
- Genre: Fantasy
- Manga
- Written by: Imomushi Narita
- Published by: Shogakukan
- Imprint: Ura Sunday Comics
- Magazine: MangaONE; Ura Sunday
- Original run: December 8, 2014 – August 26, 2018
- Volumes: 11
- Original video animation
- Directed by: Hisayoshi Hirasawa
- Studio: Creators in Pack
- Released: January 30, 2019
- Runtime: 15 minutes
- icon

It's My Life (stylized in all caps) is a Japanese web manga series written and illustrated by Imomushi Narita. It was published on Shogakukan's manga apps MangaONE and Ura Sunday from December 2014 to August 2018, with its chapters collected in eleven tankōbon volumes. An original video animation adaptation by Creators in Pack was released in January 2019.

== Plot ==
Astra Ludger Doomsday, a former captain of the royal knights, Astra retires after saving enough money to get his own house. However, after not long after his arrival at his new house, a young silver-eyed girl crashes into his house. The girl is a novice witch who mistaken Astra for the evil god. Astra not being able to state that he is not the evil god to not break the girl's heart.

== Characters ==
Astra Ludger Doomsday (アストラ・ルドガー・ドゥームズデイ, Asutora Rudogā Dūmuzudei)
Voiced by: Tetsu Inada
Noah O' Antikythira (ノア・オ・アンティキティラ, Noa O Antikitira)
Voiced by: Hiromi Igarashi

== Media ==
=== Manga ===
Written and illustrated by Imomushi Narita, It's My Life was published on Shogakukan's manga app MangaONE from December 8, 2014, to August 26, 2018; it was also published on Ura Sunday from December 15, 2014, to September 2, 2018. Shogakukan collected its chapters in eleven tankōbon volumes, released from March 12, 2015, to October 19, 2018.

==== Volumes ====
No.	Japanese release date	Japanese ISBN
1	March 12, 2015	978-4-09-125797-0
2	June 12, 2015	978-4-09-126183-0
3	October 9, 2015	978-4-09-126587-6
4	February 12, 2016	978-4-09-127025-2
5	June 10, 2016	978-4-09-127304-8
6	October 12, 2016	978-4-09-127391-8
7	February 10, 2017	978-4-09-127516-5
8	July 19, 2017	978-4-09-127657-5
9	December 12, 2017	978-4-09-128048-0
10	June 19, 2018	978-4-09-128319-1
11	October 19, 2018	978-4-09-128699-4

=== Original video animation ===
A 15-minute original video animation animated by Creators in Pack and directed by Hisayoshi Hirasawa, created through a crowdfunding campaign, was released on DVD on January 30, 2019.

== See also ==
- Killing Me / Killing You, another manga series by the same creator
