= Cellchrome =

Japanese rock band under the Being label

- Origin: Japan
- Genres: Rock, alternative rock
- Years active: 2015–2021; 2023–
- Labels: Being (2017–2021); Independent (2023–)
- Members: Mizki; Niwaken; Tatsuma; Yousuke
- Website: Official Website

YouTube information
- Channel: Cellchrome Official Channel
- Years active: 2017-2020
- Subscribers: 5.96 thousand
- Views: 1.46 million
- Last updated: January 15, 2024

Cellchrome is a 4-member Japanese rock band under the Being label, who formed in 2015 and debut in 2017 with single Stand Up Now. In 2021, they've announced disband through official website, however 2 years later they've announced reunion and

== History ==
In 2015, the band was formed in Nagoya.

In 2016, during their first anniversary of formation, they held a one-man live in music festival Nagoya Electric LadyLand Fits All.

In January 2017, they broadcast on Wednesday their weekly radio program Midnight Chrome on ZIP-FM Station. In August 2017, they made a debut with single Stand Up Now.

In January 2019, their fifth single Aozolighter debuted into the Top 10 of Oricon Weekly Single charts; it is their most successful single so far. In February 2019, they held their 1st One Man Concert at Nagoya Quattro. In June 2019, they made their first guest appearance in anime convention AnimeNEXT.

On 28 April 2021, through official website they've announced disband after one-man live in July 2021.

In May 2023, the band has resumed activities with its all original members. The announcement was made on their newly launched official website as well as their concert to be held for the first time in 2 years. They currently active as an independent group, they did not renew contract with the forming agency, B Zone.

== Members ==
- Mizki - vocals
- Niwaken (ニワケン) - bass guitar
- Tatsuma - drummer
- Yousuke (陽介) - guitarist

== Discography ==
=== Singles ===
#	Release date	Title	Peak
1st	2017/08/23	Stand Up Now	120
2nd	2017/12/13	Don't Let Me Down	89
3rd	2018/03/14	Everything OK!!	43
4th	2018/08/22	Adam to Eve	26
5th	2019/01/07	Aozolighter	8
6th	2019/08/14	My Answer	17

== Anime Soundtracks ==
- Stand Up Now was used as an opening theme for Anime television series Konbini Kareshi
- Don't Let Me Down was used as an ending theme for Anime television series Osake wa Fūfu ni Natte kara
- Everything OK!! was used as an opening theme for Anime television series Detective Conan
- Aozolighter was used as an closing theme for Anime television series Detective Conan

== Television appearances ==
- Buzzrhythm (NTV): Don't Let Me Down
- Live B (TBS): Everything's Ok!

== Interview ==
- Coming Next Artist No.15: Cellchrome
- Stand Up Now: 2youmag, Music Review Site "Mikki", Lisani,
- Don't Let Me Down: 2youmag, Tracks-Live, Music Review Site "Mikki",
- Everything's Okay: Cho-Media, Tracks-Live
- Aozolighter: Tracks-Live, Lisani, MusicVoice, Cho-Media
