= Ojisan and Marshmallow =

Japanese manga series

- Cover of Ojisan to Marshmallow volume 1

おじさんとマシュマロ (Ojisan to Mashumaro)
- Genre: Romantic comedy
- Manga
- Written by: Rekomaru Otoi
- Published by: Ichijinsha
- Original run: 2014 – present
- Volumes: 6
- Anime television series
- Directed by: Hisayoshi Hirasawa; Tokihiro Sasaki
- Written by: Atsushi Oka
- Music by: Shusei
- Studio: Creators in Pack
- Original network: TV Saitama, KBS Kyoto, Sun TV, AT-X
- Original run: January 7, 2016 – March 25, 2016
- Episodes: 12 + 1 Special

Ojisan and Marshmallow (おじさんとマシュマロ, Ojisan to Mashumaro) is a Japanese comedy manga series by Rekomaru Otoi, serialized online via the online community Pixiv, where it has received over 20 million views. It was later acquired by Ichijinsha and six tankōbon volumes have been published since 2014. A 12-episode anime television series adaptation by Creators in Pack aired between January 7 and March 25, 2016.

== Plot ==
Habahiro Hige is a man in his late thirties who works at a web-related company. He loves Tabekko marshmallows, and his co-worker, Iori Wakabayashi, often teases him about it, by eating them in front of him and buying all of his favourite type from the convenience store. Though her friends do not see what Iori likes about Habahiro, she is actually aiming to be in a romantic relationship with him, and often tries to get his attention, commenting that she likes his marshmallow-like, chubby frame, with Habahiro often unaware of what she is trying to do.

== Characters ==
Habahiro Hige (日下 幅広, Hige Habahiro)
Voiced by: Tetsu Inada
A chubby salary man in his late thirties who works in a web related company, he is obsessed with Tabekko marshmallows, to the point that he himself would (at times) hypnotically get drawn in just by the scent of it, which both Iori and MIO5 used to lure and seduce him in order to win his affection. His name "Hige" literally means facial hair which both describes to either "Beard" or Mustache in Japanese
Iori Wakabayashi (若林 伊織, Wakabayashi Iori)
Voiced by: Eri Kitamura
Hige's co-worker, who is in love with him, she often uses Hige's one-track, marshmallow-obsessed mind to win his affection but often finds her efforts stymied.
MIO5 (みおこ, Nijimori Mioko)
Voiced by: Kana Hanazawa
She is a bodacious girl whom Hige accidentally saved from a sex pervert who was groping her while in the train where she later fell head over heels for him. She also works in the same company as Hige as an illustrator. Though she competes with Iori for Hige's affection, she manages to confess her feelings for him, but was turned down because she is already in a relationship with the company president. Despite being thirty years of age, she still passes herself as twenty five in her social media account. She is also an active cosplayer.
Isamu Wakabayashi (若林 勇, Wakabayashi Isamu)
Voiced by: Tetsuya Kakihara
He is Iori's younger brother who seemly has a bit of a sister complex towards her. Though a lady's man, he is actually a virgin.
Mukai (向井)
Voiced by: Kaori Taguchi
She is Iori's co worker who is very much a foodie.
Machida (町田)
Voiced by: Suzuna Kinoshita
She is Iori's co-worker who always likes to drink after office hours, she is often pressured by her mother to find a man and get married.
Senior at the Genkitadou Marshmallow Factory (マシュマロ工場の先輩, Mashumaro Kōjō no Senpai)
Voiced by: Chika Yoshitomi
Junior at the Genkitadou Marshmallow Factory (マシュマロ工場の後輩, Mashumaro Kōjō no Kōhai)
Voiced by: Nozomi Furuki
Manager (課長, Kacho)
Voiced by: Chō

== Anime ==
The anime adaptation of Ojisan to Marshmallow aired as three-minute-long anime shorts from January 8, 2016, to March 25, 2016.
