= Love Is Like a Cocktail =

Japanese web manga and anime series

- Manga volume 1 cover featuring Chisato Mizusawa

お酒は夫婦になってから (Osake wa Fūfu ni Natte kara)
- Genre: Cooking; Romantic comedy; Slice of life
- Manga
- Written by: Crystal na Yōsuke
- Published by: Shogakukan
- Magazine: Yawaraka Spirits
- Original run: April 3, 2015 – July 19, 2019
- Volumes: 12
- Anime television series
- Directed by: Hisayoshi Hirasawa; Saori Tachibana
- Produced by: Taichi Hatanaka
- Studio: Creators in Pack
- Licensed by: Crunchyroll
- Original network: Tokyo MX, Sun TV
- Original run: October 3, 2017 – December 26, 2017
- Episodes: 14
- icon

Love Is Like a Cocktail (お酒は夫婦になってから, Osake wa Fūfu ni Natte kara) is a Japanese web manga series written and illustrated by Crystal na Yōsuke. It was serialized on Shogakukan's online manga magazine Yawaraka Spirits from April 2015 to July 2019, with its chapters collected in 12 tankōbon volumes. An anime television series adaptation by Creators in Pack aired from October to December 2017.

== Characters ==
Chisato Mizusawa (水沢 千里, Mizusawa Chisato)
Voiced by: Eri Kitamura
An 28-year-old office lady who appears to be calm and collected, but when she starts drinking, turns into a playful and cute girl. She is married to Sora, who occasionally gives her cocktails when she comes home.
Sora Mizusawa (水沢 壮良, Mizusawa Sora)
Voiced by: Mitsuhiro Ichiki
A 31-year-old furniture designer, part-time bartender who is married to Chisato, whom he affectionately calls "Chi-chan" (ちーちゃん). He takes care of the house chores and prepares meals and cocktails for Chisato when she comes home.
Yui Shiraishi (白石 結, Shiraishi Yui)
Voiced by: Ayaka Asai
Koharu Sakurai (桜井 小春, Sakurai Koharu)
Voiced by: Arisa Nakata

== Media ==
=== Manga ===
Written and illustrated by Crystal na Yōsuke, Love Is Like a Cocktail was serialized on Shogakukan's online manga magazine Yawaraka Spirits from April 3, 2015, to July 19, 2019. Shogakukan collected its chapters in twelve tankōbon volumes, released from October 9, 2015, to September 12, 2019.

==== Volumes ====
No.	Japanese release date	Japanese ISBN
1	October 9, 2015	978-4-09-187250-0
2	January 12, 2016	978-4-09-187384-2
3	May 12, 2016	978-4-09-187685-0
4	August 12, 2016	978-4-09-187814-4
5	December 12, 2016	978-4-09-189310-9
6	May 12, 2017	978-4-09-189459-5
7	September 29, 2017	978-4-09-189670-4
8	December 12, 2017	978-4-09-189742-8
9	April 12, 2018	978-4-09-189846-3
10	August 9, 2018	978-4-09-860095-3
11	April 12, 2019	978-4-09-860262-9
12	September 12, 2019	978-4-09-860344-2

=== Anime ===
An anime television series adaptation by studio Creators in Pack was announced on April 29, 2017. It aired from October 3 to December 26, 2017, on Tokyo MX and Sun TV networks. The chief director for the series is Hisayoshi Hirasawa, while the director is Saori Tachibana. Taichi Hatanaka served as the animation producer of the series, while Yuzuko Hanai is the director of photography. The opening theme titled "Don't Let Me Down" is performed by Cellchrome. Crunchyroll announced that it streamed the series with English subtitles. A fourteenth episode was streamed on October 6, 2018.

==== Episodes ====
No.	Title (Note: All English titles are taken from Crunchyroll.)	Original air date
1	"First Glass: Plum Splet"; Transliteration: "Ume Supureddo" (Japanese: 梅スプレッド)	October 3, 2017
2	"Second Glass: Orange Breeze"; Transliteration: "Mikan Burīze" (Japanese: みかんブリーゼ)	October 10, 2017
3	"Third Glass: Cinderella"; Transliteration: "Shinderera" (Japanese: シンデレラ)	October 17, 2017
4	"Fourth Glass: Spritzer"; Transliteration: "Supurittsā" (Japanese: スプリッツァー)	October 24, 2017
5	"Fifth Glass: Special Banana Cocktail"; Transliteration: "Banana Kakuteru" (Japanese: バナナカクテル)	October 31, 2017
6	"Sixth Glass: Bellini"; Transliteration: "Berīni" (Japanese: ベリーニ)	November 7, 2017
7	"Seventh Glass: Irish Coffee"; Transliteration: "Airisshukōhī" (Japanese: アイリッシュコーヒー)	November 14, 2017
8	"Eighth Glass: Egg Sake"; Transliteration: "Tamagozake" (Japanese: 玉子酒)	November 21, 2017
9	"Ninth Glass: Zoom"; Transliteration: "Zūmu" (Japanese: ズーム)	November 28, 2017
10	"Tenth Glass: Shandygaff"; Transliteration: "Shandigafu" (Japanese: シャンディガフ)	December 5, 2017
11	"Eleventh Glass: Rainy Night"; Transliteration: "Ame no Yoru ni" (Japanese: 雨の夜に)	December 12, 2017
12	"Twelfth Glass: First Time"; Transliteration: "Fāsutotaimu" (Japanese: ファーストタイム)	December 19, 2017
13	"Thirteenth Glass: Frozen Mango Cocktail"; Transliteration: "Mangōfurōzun" (Japanese: マンゴーフローズン)	December 26, 2017
14	"Fourteenth Glass: Yuzu Hot Sake"; Transliteration: "Yuzu Onsen" (Japanese: ゆず温泉)	October 6, 2018 (streaming)

== See also ==
- Onidere, another manga series by the same author
- Otokonoko Zuma, another web manga series by the same author
