= Miritari! =

Japanese manga series

- Cover of Miritari! volume 1 by Ichijinsha

みりたり!
- Genre: Comedy
- Manga
- Written by: Mamo Williams
- Published by: Ichijinsha
- Magazine: Manga 4-koma Palette
- Original run: 2009 – 2013
- Volumes: 5
- Manga

Miritari! Otsugata
- Written by: Mamo Williams
- Published by: Ichijinsha
- Magazine: Manga 4-koma Palette
- Original run: 2014 – June 2018
- Volumes: 4
- Anime television series
- Directed by: Hiroshi Kimura
- Written by: Hiroshi Kimura
- Music by: Fūga Hatori
- Studio: Creators in Pack
- Original network: AT-X, KBS, TV Saitama, tvk, Sun TV
- Original run: January 7, 2015 – March 25, 2015
- Episodes: 12+1 special

Miritari! (みりたり!; "Military!") is a Japanese four-panel comedy manga series by Mamo Williams, serialized in Ichijinsha's seinen manga magazine Manga 4-koma Palette. It was collected in five tankōbon volumes, released between 2009 and 2013. A sequel series titled Miritari! Otsugata (みりたり! 乙型; "Military! Model B") began serialization in the same magazine from 2014. A 12-episode anime television series adaptation by Creators in Pack aired between January 7 and March 25, 2015.

== Characters ==
Lieutenant Lutgalnikov (ルトガルニコフ中尉, Rutogarunikofu Chūi)
Voiced by: Nao Tōyama

She is a trigger-happy and highly strung little girl, who happens to be a member of the Krakozhia Dukedom Special Forces, she holds the rank of 1st Lieutenant and is armed with a Remington Model 870 pump-action shotgun, though sometimes she would be seen holding other kinds of weapons like the M20 "Super Bazooka." She and her subordinate Haruka were under orders to protect Souhei from assassin of the Grania Republic. She and Haruka drives a T-34 Russian tank which they've used to barge into Souhei's house.

She's often called "Luto Chūi (lieutenant)" or "Chūi" by Sōhei.

Colonel Aria (アリア・グラスマン大佐, Aria Gurasuman Taisa)
Voiced by: Misaki Suzuki

She is a voluptuous lady who is a commissioned officer in the Krakozhia Dukedom military, she is also Haruka and Lutgalnikov immediate superior. She was sent as an additional backup for the two girls whom were assigned to protect Sōhei. She is very good in knife fighting as well with hand-to-hand combat, she has a habit of affectionately hugging people tightly in between her huge cleavage. However she is also a bit of a klutz. She is the only one who openly express her feelings for Sōhei.

Second Lieutenant Haruka (ハルカ少尉, Haruka Shōi)
Voiced by: Ayane Sakura

She is Lutgalnikov subordinate who is also tasked to protect Souhei. She holds the rank of 2nd Lieutenant in the armed forces of Krakozhia Dukedom. Though a bit clumsy and ditzy, she makes up for it by sheer aggression especially on Sohei whenever he accidentally sees her panties.

She is expert marksman, where she uses a Remington Model 700 Sniper Rifle, but most of the time she always carry's an M67 grenade.

Yukari Mizuno (水野 ゆかり, Mizuno Yukari)
Voiced by: Ayano Terasaki

She is a pretty buxom lady who happens to be Sohei's next door neighbor, she is basically a lolicon who has a thing for cute little girls like Shakirov, who started to live with her after escaping from her failed attempt to eliminate Sōhei. She likes teasing the girls with the latter often putting him into a lot of uncomfortable situation where the girls would compete for him, it is suggested that he is the only guy that she has feelings for that she treats nicely. Thought she is cheerful and friendly, she can also be very terrifying when angry.

Sergeant Shakirov (シャチーロフ軍曹, Shachiirofu Gunsō)
Voiced by: Inori Minase

She is an assassin sent by the Grania Republic to eliminate Sohei, she packs a mean pair of weaponry that consist of two 5.56 Microguns. However, she is rather slow, lazy, unable to stand anything that is gross and an airhead. Though she lives with Mizuno, she fears her very much. She has two other comrades, particularly, Grue a helicopter pilot who literally has to be a dog in order to stay at Mizuno's house and Ossan or Uncle who used to stay in the same house, but has moved in with Sohei after he volunteered to fix his house.

She holds the rank of Sergeant in the Grania military.

Sōhei Yano (矢野 宗平, Yano Sōhei)
Voiced by: Yoshitaka Yamaya

He is the main protagonist, who is a high school student that has to deal with the wacky people living around him, much to his chagrin. His father is a former salary man who found himself drafted into Krakozhia Dukedom armed forces, due to the clerical error on his part.
