= Creators in Pack =

Japanese animation studio

Creators in Pack Inc.
- Native name: 株式会社クリエイターズインパック
- Romanized name: Kabushiki-gaisha Kurieitāzu in Pakku
- Type: Kabushiki gaisha
- Industry: Japanese animation
- Founded: April 2013
- Headquarters: Naniwa-ku, Osaka, Japan
- Key people: Hisayoshi Hirasawa (president); Yoichi Beppu (CEO)
- Divisions: Tokyo; Jakarta; Yogyakarta; Bali; Malaysia; Shenyang; Hunan; Hanoi
- Subsidiaries: Fine Colors
- Website: www.creatorsinpack.com

Creators in Pack Inc. (Japanese: 株式会社クリエイターズインパック, Hepburn: Kabushiki-gaisha Kurieitāzu in Pakku) is a Japanese animation studio founded in 2013.

== Works ==
=== Anime television series ===
- Miritari! (2015)
- Danchigai (2015)
- Hacka Doll the Animation (2015)
- Ojisan and Marshmallow (2016)
- Ozmafia!! (2016)
- Bloodivores (2016)
- Kiitarō Shōnen no Yōkai Enikki (2016)
- Miss Bernard said. (2016)
- NTR: Netsuzou Trap (2017)
- Love Is Like a Cocktail (2017)
- Tachibanakan To Lie Angle (2018; with Studio Lings)
- Rinshi!! Ekoda-chan (2019, episodes 2 and 5)

=== Original video animation ===
- It's My Life (2019)

=== Original net animation ===
- God Eater Reso Nantoka Gekijou (2018; with Passione)
- Musunde Hiraite (2018)

=== Music videos ===
- Meychan: Number Nine (2020)
