= Ozmafia!! =

Japanese otome game

- OZAMAFIA!!
- Video game

OZAMAFIA!!
- Developer: Poni-Pachet SY
- Publisher: JP: Poni-Pachet SY (PC); JP: dramatic create (PlayStation Vita, Nintendo Switch); WW: MangaGamer (PC)
- Designed by: Satoi (さとい)
- Music by: project lights
- Genre: Visual novel
- Platform: PC (Windows XP, Windows Vista, Windows 7); PlayStation Vita; Nintendo Switch
- Released: JP: June 28, 2013 (PC); JP: February 26, 2015 (PlayStation Vita); WW: April 29, 2016 (PC); JP: August 27, 2020 (Nintendo Switch)
- Manga
- Illustrated by: Tsukigase Yurino
- Published by: Futabasha
- Magazine: WEB Comic Action
- Original run: September 12, 2013 – July 28, 2015
- Volumes: 3
- Anime television series
- Directed by: Hisayoshi Hirasawa
- Written by: Yūmasu
- Music by: Kimiyoshi Maruyama
- Studio: Creators in Pack
- Licensed by: Crunchyroll
- Original network: Tokyo MX; Sun TV
- Original run: July 7, 2016 – September 22, 2016
- Episodes: 12

Ozmafia!! (stylized in all caps) is a Japanese otome game originally developed and released by Poni-Pachet SY for PC on June 28, 2013.

dramatic create released a new version titled OZMAFIA!!-vivace- for the PlayStation Vita on February 26, 2015, and later released it on the Nintendo Switch on August 27, 2020. MangaGamer released the game in English on April 29, 2016.

== Characters ==
=== Protagonist ===
Fūka (フーカ)
Voiced by: Akiko Hanamura
Having lost all of her memories, which includes her own name, she is taken in by the Oz Family while wandering the streets. She is cheerful and honest

=== Oz Family ===
Caramia (カラミア)
Voiced by: Tarusuke Shingaki
The head of the Oz Family, he possesses a broad-minded personality and is popular in town. Designed after the Cowardly Lion from The Wonderful Wizard of Oz.
Kyrie (キリエ)
Voiced by: Kazuyuki Okitsu
The counselor of the Oz Family, he appears polite and soft-spoken at first glance, but is actually cunning and calculating. Designed after the Scarecrow from The Wonderful Wizard of Oz.
Axel (アクセル)
Voiced by: Atsushi Kousaka
An executive of the Oz Family, reticent and strictly performs only what he is instructed to do. Designed after the Tin Woodman from The Wonderful Wizard of Oz.
Udhi (ユーディ)
Voiced by: Shin Takahashi
A member of the Oz Family. A womanizer.
Welte (ウェルテ)
Voiced by: Mitsuaki Okamoto
A member of the Oz Family. A father of two children.

=== Grimm Family ===
Scarlet (スカーレット)
Voiced by: Mitsuhiro Ichiki
Being an executive of the Grimm Family, he is cool-headed, polite, and dutiful. Has no interest in feuds and is reluctant to join conflicts. Designed after Little Red Riding Hood from Grimms' Fairy Tales.
Hansel (ヘンゼル)
Voiced by: Junya Enoki
An executive of the Grimm Family. Gretel's older twin brother. Belligerent and extremely optimistic. Designed after Hansel from Hansel and Gretel in Grimms' Fairy Tales.
Gretel (グレーテル)
Voiced by: Masami Nozuki
An executive of the Grimm Family. Hansel's younger twin sister. Constantly pessimistic and foul-mouthed. Belligerent like her brother. Designed after Gretel from Hansel and Gretel in Grimms' Fairy Tales.
Hameln (ハーメルン)
Voiced by: Eiji Hara (PC), Yūki Ono (PS Vita, Anime)
The boss of the Grimm Family. Playful yet open-minded, he is deeply admired by his subordinates. Away from the family for certain reasons. Designed after the Pied Piper of Hamelin from Grimms' Fairy Tales.

=== Wolfgang ===
Caesar (シーザー)
Voiced by: Takuya Kirimoto
Leader of the outlaw group "Wolfgang." Cruel and does not hesitate to harm others.
Soh (ソウ)
Voiced by: Yūichi Iguchi
Caesar's right-hand man. Gentle, bright, and friendly. In the anime, he is the principal of Oz Academy.

=== Boots Family ===
Pashet (パシェ)
Voiced by: Kyōko Fujii
The head of the Boots Family, a female knight who is earnest and possesses a strong sense of justice. Designed after Puss in Boots.
Belsi (ベルシー)
Voiced by: Yoshi Minegishi
A member of the Boots Family, he is Pashet's caretaker.

=== Heidi Family ===
Heidi (ヘイディ)
Voiced by: Takehito Toyoshima (Game), Hidenori Takahashi (Anime)
The head of the Heidi Family, he is a father figure with a strong and reliable presence, he runs a massive dairy farm. Designed after Heidi from Heidi.
Peter (ペーター)
Voiced by: Izumi Chiba
The counselor of the Heidi Family, he is extremely taciturn. Designed after Peter from Heidi.

=== Andersen Family ===
Ande (アンデ)
Voiced by: Yuki Uchiyama
The head of the Andersen Family, he is highly emotional and straightforward. Designed after The Little Match Girl from Andersen's Fairy Tales.
Eling (エリング)
Voiced by: Eri Kuraya
An executive of the Andersen Family. Shy, lacking in confidence, and constantly frightened of something. Possesses the ability to levitate. Designed after The Ugly Duckling from Andersen's Fairy Tales.
Melisas (メリサス)
Voiced by: Mitsuaki Okamoto
The counselor of the Andersen Family. An intelligent, palm-sized elderly gentleman. Designed after Thumbelina from Andersen's Fairy Tales.

=== Oscar Wilde ===
Dorian Gray (ドリアン・グレイ)
Voiced by: Hiroyuki Honda
Manager of the brothel "Oscar Wilde." Overseer of the church who also handles duties as a priest.
Alfani (アルファーニ)
Voiced by: Kazuya Yamaguchi
A male prostitute at the brothel "Oscar Wilde." Possesses beauty that charms both men and women alike. Designed after The Happy Prince by Oscar Wilde.
Manboy (マンボイ)
Voiced by: Takashi Kuratsu
Receptionist and handyman at the brothel "Oscar Wilde." Also entrusted with personnel and financial management. Designed after the Swallow from The Happy Prince by Oscar Wilde.

=== Sherwood Clinic ===
Robin Hood (ロビン・フッド)
Voiced by: Satoshi Fujinami
The town's sole physician who operates the Sherwood Clinic. Treats everyone equally regardless of family affiliation or status. Designed after Robin Hood.

== Development and release ==
Development of Ozmafia!! began in 2010 by Poni-Pachet SY. The game was released for Windows XP, Windows Vista, and Windows 7 on June 28, 2013.

The game's illustrations are done by Satoi.

In October 2014, OZMAFIA!!-vivace- was announced by dramatic create in development for the PlayStation Vita. The game was released on the PlayStation Vita on February 26, 2015. The game was meant to be released for the Nintendo Switch on July 23, 2020, however, it was postponed and released on August 27, 2020.

In June 2014, it was announced by Poni-Pachet SY that Ozmafia!! would be localized in English. In July, MangaGamer was confirmed to be the English publisher. The game was released by MangaGamer on Steam on April 29, 2016.

On April 1, 2017 (April fools day), Poni-Pachet announced a new game, titled OZMAFIA!!0 -RefleXion-, to be in development. On the 10-year anniversary of OZMAFIA!!, June 28, 2023, Poni-Pachet announced the game was retitled OZMAFIA!! -RefleXion-.

== Manga ==
Illustrated by Tsukigase Yurino, it was serialized in Futabasha's WEB Comic Action, 3 volumes were released.

No.	Release date	ISBN
1	September 12, 2013	978-4-575-84287-6
2	June 10, 2014	978-4-575-84428-3
3	July 28, 2015	978-4-575-84654-6

A spin-off titled OZMAFIA!! Presents: The Seductive Mansion of Oscar Wilde (OZMAFIA!!presents 淫美なるオスカー・ワイルドの館, OZMAFIA! ! Presents inbi naru osukā wairudo no yakata), was published in one volume by Ohzora Shuppan. Featuring illustrations by Yuno Peko, Kuromura Motohito, and Mii Michiru.

No.	Release date	ISBN
1	June 17, 2014	978-4-7767-3780-3

== Anime ==
An anime adaptation was announced in February 2016 via Poni-Pachet's Twitter account. The series was made by Creators in Pack, with Hisayoshi Hirasawa as the director, Yūmasu served as the script supervisor, with Sonoka Kuroiwa designed the characters for the animation, Satoi, the game's original artist and character designer, supervised the production, and Kimiyoshi Maruyama of Project Lights composed the music. The series aired on Tokyo MX and Sun TV from July 6, till September 22, 2016. (Note: Tokyo MX listed the date as July 6 at midnight, which is effectively July 7, and Sun TV listed the date as July 11 at 25:30 JST, which is effectively July 12 at 1:30 A.M.) Crunchyroll steams the series in English.

No.	Title	Original release date
1	"Welcome to Oz Academy"; Transliteration: "Youkoso Oz Gakuen e" (Japanese: ようこそオズ学園へ)	July 6, 2016
2	"Remedy"; Transliteration: "Kyuusai" (Japanese: 救済)	July 14, 2016
3	"Remedial Club"; Transliteration: "Hoshuu Bu" (Japanese: 補習部)	July 21, 2016
4	"The Cafeteria"; Transliteration: "Shokudou" (Japanese: 食堂)	July 21, 2016
5	"The Letter"; Transliteration: "Tegami" (Japanese: 手紙)	August 4, 2016
6	"Attack"; Transliteration: "Shuugeki" (Japanese: 襲撃)	August 11, 2016
7	"Donuts"; Transliteration: "Donuts" (Japanese: ドーナツ)	August 18, 2016
8	"The Class President"; Transliteration: "Seitokaichou" (Japanese: 生徒会長)	August 25, 2016
9	"Field Trip"; Transliteration: "Kougai Gakushuu" (Japanese: 校外学習)	September 1, 2016
10	"Hazardous Materials"; Transliteration: "Kikenbutsu" (Japanese: 危険物)	September 8, 2016
11	"Substitute"; Transliteration: "Dairi" (Japanese: 代理)	September 15, 2016
12	"The Color Of Ripe Golden Grains"; Transliteration: "Inaho-iro" (Japanese: 稲穂色)	September 22, 2016

== Stage plays ==
A stage play adaptation, simply titled OZMAFIA!!, was performed from September 6th to 10th, 2017, at the Space Zero theater. A second stage play titled OZMAFIA!! sink into oblivion, was performed at Soace Zero from October 23rd to 27th, 2019. Both stage plays were directed by Naohiro Ise.

Cast
Character	OZMAFIA!!	sink into oblivion
Fuka	Miku Katō	Sumire Ichimura
Caramia	Shōta Onuma	Keisuke Kaminaga
Kyrie	Daichi Yamaguchi	Yoshiki Tani
Axel	Kōsuke Kaede	Kōsuke Asuma
Yūdi	Masashi Kanda	—N/a
Werte	Kazuki	—N/a
Scarlet	Shinichirō Ueda	Ryō Yashima
Hansel	Masaaki Nagakura	Takumi Hashitani
Gretel	Haru Kazuki	Ayana Kinoshita
Hamelin	Tomohiro Okutani	Yūsaku Kawasaki
Caesar	Yū Yoshioka	Shūtarō Andō
Sō	Ryōtarō Akazawa	Taka Ōyabu
Heidi	—N/a	Kotori Kojima
Peter	—N/a	Ema
Ande	Mayu Sekiya	Sana Hoshimori
Ering	Kento Masui	Yōta Ōmi
Melisus	Kōsuke Okamoto (voice only)	—N/a
Dorian Gray	—N/a	Fūta Sunaga
Alfani	—N/a	Kōsuke Shiraishi
Manboy	—N/a	Jun'ichi Takanashi
Robin Hood	Ken'ichi Yumoto	Takatomo Kurosawa
Dorothy	Izumi Chiba (voice only)	—N/a
