= Otokonoko Zuma =

Japanese manga series

- Volume 1 cover, depicting Yuki (left) and Kou

おとこのこ妻
- Genre: Romantic comedy, slice of life
- Manga
- Written by: Crystal na Yousuke
- Published by: Shogakukan
- Imprint: Shōnen Sunday Comics Special
- Magazine: Sunday Webry
- Original run: July 15, 2016 – January 31, 2020
- Volumes: 3

Otokonoko Zuma (Japanese: おとこのこ妻; "My Wife is a Man") is a slice-of-life romantic comedy manga series written and drawn by Crystal na Yousuke. Shogakukan serialized it through its webcomic platform Sunday Webry from July 15, 2016, to January 31, 2020, and released it across three collected tankōbon volumes between 2017 and 2020.

The story follows a married couple, Yuki and Kou, through short chapters depicting their everyday life. Although they are both men, they consider themselves wife and husband, and Yuki dresses like a woman. The series was well received by critics, who liked the portrayal of Yuki and Kou's romantic relationship, and found Yuki a cute and appealing character.

== Premise ==
Otokonoko Zuma is a romantic comedy manga following a loving married couple: the soft-spoken and feminine Yuki, and the honest and quirky Kou. Although the two appear to be a heterosexual couple and consider themselves wife and husband, Yuki is a cross-dressing man. Each chapter follows a slice-of-life scenario such as Yuki and Kou meeting acquaintances or going to the cinema, but also situations arising from how Yuki is cross-dressing and how others react to him, such as when he goes to the men's public bath or uses the men's bathroom. Yuki thinks cross-dressing is embarrassing at times, but still enjoys doing it and loves making Kou happy by being cute.

== Production and release ==
Otokonoko Zuma was written and drawn by Crystal na Yousuke, using a short-form, eight-page format for the chapters. It was serialized by Shogakukan on a monthly basis through their webcomic platform Sunday Webry from July 15, 2016, to January 31, 2020, and was collected in three tankōbon volumes from 2017 to 2020 under Shogakukan's Shounen Sunday Comics imprint. The release schedule for the volumes was slower than usual for manga due to how only eight new pages were published each month, meaning it took more than a year to accumulate enough new chapters to fill a whole tankōbon volume.

=== Volumes ===
No.	Release date	ISBN
1	September 29, 2017	978-4091278265
Chapters 1-14
Kou and Yuki do various things together, such as going to the cinema, the public bath, and the beach, and spending time with Yuki's parents, Kou's sister Fuku, Kou's friend Kido, and Kou's boss Baba. In a flashback, Yuki and Kou are shown becoming friends as teenagers. Yuki fell in love with Kou and told him how he felt, but Kou needed time to think about it. Three years later, Kou proposed to Yuki, and they married.
2	November 12, 2018	978-4091287076
Chapters 15-30
Kou and Yuki spend time together and with their friends and relatives, such as Yuki and his cross-dressing friend Nana going lingerie shopping. Yuki wins against the skilled fighting game player Momoko at an arcade, and later gets hired at Momoko's family-run bakery. Yuki and Nana become friends with Momoko, and Nana teases Momoko for finding Yuki attractive, while admitting to being bi himself. In a flashback to Kou's teenage years, he becomes friends with Kido while pondering his feelings for Yuki. He dates a girl for three months, but she breaks up with him as he is interested in someone else.
3	November 19, 2020	978-4098503193
Chapters 31-44
After Yuki, Kou, Kido, Nana, and Nana's boyfriend Nobu have dinner together, Kido ponders how he is the only in the friend group who is single. Yuki and Nana bring him with them to a men's beauty salon, where he meets Nana's cross-dressing friend Asuka. Kido spends time with Asuka several more times, going to an izakaya with him and the others and exercising with him at the gym, and realizes that he is attracted to him. Asuka likes him back, and the two grow closer, particularly during a trip to a hot spring where they share a bedroom. The series ends with Kou and Yuki writing bucket lists and talking about things they want to do together.

== Reception ==
Otokonoko Zuma was critically well received, but despite this, the collected volumes only saw a very limited print run; Crystal na Yousuke described it as "unlikely" that readers would find copies in book stores and recommended reading the e-book versions.

NLab liked the series, describing it as standing out from other manga about gay romance or cross-dressing. Although the series does not discuss LGBT issues much, they did not think it felt missing, and liked seeing Yuki and Kou being happy together and their families accepting them, describing it as a good portrayal of a loving marriage. They praised the scene where Kou proposes to Yuki, with Kou treating Yuki's gender as completely irrelevant to whether he would want to marry him. Nico Nico News agreed, describing Yuki and Kou's relationship as heartwarming. NLab, Natalie, and Nico Nico News all found Yuki cute; Nico Nico News described him as attractive and full of what makes otokonoko characters charming, with the contrast between his gender and his appearance. NLab appreciated how characters respect Yuki's gender and treat him as a man regardless of his femininity and how he is the wife.

== See also ==
- Onidere, another manga by the same author
- Love Is Like a Cocktail, another web manga by the same author
