= Jewel Pod =

Fictional device in the Jewelpet franchise

The Jewel Pod (ジュエルポッド, Jueru Poddo) is a touch-screen like device used by the Jewelpets first appearing in the Jewelpet Twinkle Anime series. As it became a main staple to the franchise, the Jewel Pod was made into an interactive toy by Sega Toys in 2010.

== Description ==
The Jewel Pod, as it says is loosely inspired from Apple's iPhone, which uses a touch screen concept. The first version of the Jewel Pod is first released by both Sanrio and Sega Toys in 2010, and is only used for communication purposes by touching the screen in a certain movement to type out the letters. The first version comes only in two colors: a Red one with uses Ruby's Voice and a White one that came out in 2011, that uses Labra's voice. A second version is also released in the same year to coincide the release of Jewelpet Sunshine, called Jewel Pod Crystal. The Crystal variant contains more playability than the first version such as minigames, fortune telling and improved messaging capabilities. An improved version called Jewel Pod Crystal Plus is released in 2012.

The third and current Jewel Pod is also released in 2012, called Jewel Pod Diamond. As the diamond retains the Crystal Plus's features, it also adds newer capabilities such as a camera and an SD card slot. The fourth incarnations, called Jewel Music Pod is released in April 2013 and the Jewel Pod Diamond Premium, which is released in July 2013.

== Versions ==
=== Jewel Pod ===
The First Generation of the Jewel Pod released in 2010, coinciding the release of Jewelpet Twinkle. The main function of the first Jewel Pod is mainly messaging, and only uses a touch panel instead of the Liquid Crystal Display. On writing messages, the user must touch the screen in a certain movement or magical order to type out the letters. An infrared sensor is also equipped on the toy, allowing it for sending and receiving voice messages. The first version comes only in two colors: a Red one with uses Ruby's Voice and a White one that came out in 2011, that uses Labra's voice.

=== Jewel Pod Crystal/Crystal Plus ===
The Second Generation of the Jewel Pod released in 2011, coinciding the release of Jewelpet Sunshine. The function of the Crystal is the same as the first version, but the touch panel is replaced with a monochrome LCD. Newer features present in crystal includes Fortune Telling and Mini Games. The second version comes in both red and white colors when it first came out. An enhanced version called the Jewel Pod Crystal Plus is released, with both pink and purple colors.

=== Jewel Pod Diamond ===
The Third Generation of the Jewel Pod released in 2012, coinciding the release of Jewelpet Kira Deco. A colored LCD is implemented into the design as well as a camera and an SD Card Slot. The Diamond has a more enhanced messaging capabilities unlike the previous two incarnations, now implementing both the English alphabet and symbols. The diamond also has a built in memory, capable on storing messages that's received as well as pictures captured using the Jewel Pod's camera. The applications in the Diamond is much more customizable as custom apps can be played using an SD Card. The Diamond only comes in three colors: Pink, Purple and Blue.

=== Jewel Music Pod ===
A music device released in April 2013, coinciding the release of Jewelpet Happiness. Unlike its previous counterparts, the Music Pod is small in size, shaped like a crystal heart and has a small colored LCD screen with three buttons for operation. The toy operates as a Portable media player, allowing it to play MP3 files with the use of a SD card and has 8 official features, such as minigames and fortune telling. It also has connectivity with the Jewel Pod Diamond to view pictures through the photo viewer.

=== Jewel Pod Diamond Premium ===
The Fourth Generation of the Jewel Pod revealed at the 2013 Tokyo Toy Show. The new incarnation includes a new design with a newly built Operating System and touch screen that can be used by hand or with an included stylus. The new version is also compatible with the upcoming JSPod.

=== Jewel Pod Premium Heart ===
The Fifth generation of the Jewel Pod released in May 2014, coinciding the release of Lady Jewelpet. Aside from the updated aesthetics and design, the new version features a much faster core operating system and implementation of the Motion Detection Sensor for minigames.

=== Jewel Pad ===
The Jewel Pad is a tablet-like device to be released officially on August 7, 2014. Basically a larger version of the Jewel Pod, the toy spots a 7-inch LCD screen with an included stylus and connectivity with the Jewel Pod Premium Heart. It is also has a rechargeable battery pack, which can be used for 5 consecutive hours in full charge. Aside from the basic app features, more applications can be installed through a QR code and connectivity to a USB port with an included USB connector.

== In the anime ==
Jewel Pods had become a staple communication and magical device used by the Jewelpets in the Anime series. It transports a Jewelpet into the Human World through a magical portal when it used. It can even send a human and the Jewelpet into Jewel Land using the same transportation, but only through a computer. It can also freeze time, making the Jewelpet and its human partner have a good time in Jewel Land until they return to Earth. Several features of the Jewel Pot can be activated by touching it like a touch screen phone, which came handy on browsing spells, using a radar to find its human partner or another Jewelpet and stores magical items like the Rare Rare Drops and the Ble Ble Drops.

In Jewelpet Sunshine, the Jewel Pod and Jewel Pod Crystal retains its usefulness as a magical item for the students of Sunshine Academy, even for Jewelpets. The Jewel Pod is used as a normal smartphone as well as casting magic, In Kira Deco, the Jewel Pod Diamond is used by all Jewelpets in Jewel Land and each of them were decorated with jewels and other decorations, depending on the user. It also allows the user to use magic as well. The Kira Deco 5 also obtained their own version of the Jewel Pod Diamond, which now allows them to contact the Jewelpets and identify the Deco Stones. In Episode 27, Ruby's obtains Jewelina's Jewel Pod Diamond and uses it to store the Deco Stones.

== Reception ==
The Jewel Pod and Jewel Pod Crystal sold in a combined total of 300,000 Units in Japan alone. In the press release by Sega Toys on October 1, 2012, the Jewel Pod Diamond sold about 160,000 units in less than two months since its release and topped the charts as the most sold girl's toy in Japan. The company will have the target sales of 400,000 in the end of the year and will have a combined total of 700,000 units sold on all three Jewel Pods.
