= Transparent Light Blue =

Japanese manga series

- First tankōbon volume cover

透明な薄い水色に (Toumei na Usui Mizuiro ni)
- Genre: Romance; Drama; Yuri
- Manga
- Written by: Kiyoko Iwami
- Published by: Ichijinsha
- English publisher: NA: Seven Seas Entertainment
- Magazine: Comic Yuri Hime
- Original run: October 18, 2017 – December 18, 2017
- Volumes: 1

Transparent Light Blue (Japanese: 透明な薄い水色に, Hepburn: Toumei na Usui Mizuiro ni) is a Japanese yuri manga series written and illustrated by Kiyoko Iwami. It was published in Ichijinsha's Comic Yuri Hime from October 18, 2017, to December 18, 2017, before being collected into a single tankōbon volume in 2018. It is licensed for an English-language release by Seven Seas Entertainment.

== Synopsis ==
Ritsu, a high school girl who is in love with her childhood friend Ichika, has been keeping her feelings to herself. However, when her childhood friend Shun confesses his love for Ichika, their relationship turns into a love triangle.

== Publication ==
Written and illustrated by Kiyoko Iwami, Transparent Light Blue was serialized in Ichijinsha's Comic Yuri Hime from October 18, 2017, to December 18, 2017. It was collected into a tankōbon volume on January 18, 2018, including two additional short stories "Apron" and "Shade".

The series is licensed for an English release in North America by Seven Seas Entertainment.

No.	Original release date	Original ISBN	English release date	English ISBN
1	January 18, 2018	9784758077729	April 2, 2019	978-1-642750-41-6

== Reception ==
The series has received mixed to negative reviews. In Anime News Network's "Spring 2019 Manga Guide" Rebecca Silverman gave Transparent Light Blue a 2.5 rating and Faye Hopper gave it a 2 rating. While Silverman felt the series "treads a little too close to the “nonconsensual” line for me to be fully invested", she went on to note that "if sexier yuri (without any actual sex) is what you're looking for and those issues don't bother you, Transparent Light Blue delivers while feeling less trashy than Citrus." Hopper had a similar negative review, finding that "Transparent Light Blue is a case where all the awareness and understanding of how messed-up a situation is in the world can't salvage its overall content."

Reviewing the series for Otaku USA, Jason Bradley Thompson found the pacing "iffy", feeling the series tried to do too much in too few pages, concluding that "In both the central and secondary story, original ideas clash against clunky execution and sometimes crude artwork." Erica Friedman of Yuricon was more forgiving toward the series, giving it an overall 7 out of 10 and remarking that "In 2010, Transparent Light Blue would have felt like a triumph. In 2019, it feels a little regressive, but still delivers a dose of dopamine if you like soap opera."
