= I Married My Female Friend =

Japanese yuri manga

- First tankōbon volume cover

女ともだちと結婚してみた。 (Onna Tomodachi to Kekkon Shitemita)
- Genre: Romance; Slice of Life; Yuri
- Manga
- Written by: Shio Usui
- Published by: Ichijinsha
- English publisher: NA: Seven Seas Entertainment
- Magazine: Comic Yuri Hime
- Original run: November 18, 2020 – October 18, 2023
- Volumes: 4
- icon

I Married My Female Friend (女ともだちと結婚してみた。, Onna Tomodachi to Kekkon Shitemita) is a Japanese yuri manga written and illustrated by Shio Usui. It was serialized in Ichijinsha's Comic Yuri Hime from November 2020 to October 2023. It is licensed in English by Seven Seas Entertainment.

== Plot ==
Best friends Kurumi and Ruriko made a promise that if they are both single in five years time, they would marry each other. Five years on the two keep their promise and get married, with Kurumi writing about the experience for a lifestyle column. The two learn what it means for them to be a married couple and consider whether they are well suited for each other to stay married.

== Publication ==
Written and illustrated by Shio Usui, I Married My Female Friend was serialized in Ichijinsha's Comic Yuri Hime from November 18, 2020, to October 18, 2023. The series was collected in four tankōbon volumes from September 17, 2021, to December 18, 2023.

The series is licensed for an English release in North America by Seven Seas Entertainment.

No.	Original release date	Original ISBN	English release date	English ISBN
1	September 17, 2021	978-4-75-802295-8	December 12, 2023	979-8-88843-002-6
2	April 18, 2022	978-4-75-802398-6	April 9, 2024	979-8-88843-357-7
3	February 16, 2023	978-4-75-802500-3	August 27, 2024	979-8-88843-852-7
4	December 18, 2023	978-4-75-802637-6	February 4, 2025	979-8-89160-637-1

== Reception ==
Erica Friedman of Yuricon gave the first volume and overall 8 rating and the second volume a 9. In her review of volume 2 Friedman noted that "Usui Shio-sensei is best known here for Doughnuts Under a Crescent Moon, which is an unconventional story about a couple finding affection. This series is similar in the sense that this is not a typical romance, but is about familial bonds and affection. The dynamics of the couple are wholly different, but this too is a series that gives us a chance to see a relationship that is not the typical framework of – dating-romance-partnership. And, in doing so, give us a chance to see partnership as something more than just an outcropping of love and sex."
