= Fu~Fu =

Japanese manga series

- Volume 1 cover

ふ〜ふ
- Genre: Romantic comedy; Yuri
- Manga
- Written by: Minamoto Hisanari
- Published by: Ichijinsha
- Magazine: Comic Yuri Hime S Comic Yuri Hime
- Original run: December 18, 2009 – January 18, 2013
- Volumes: 2

Fu~Fu (Japanese: ふ〜ふ) is a Japanese yuri manga series written and illustrated by Minamoto Hisanari. The series began serialization in Ichijinsha's Comic Yuri Hime S magazine in December 2009, before transferring to Comic Yuri Hime magazine where it finished its serialization in January 2013.

== Synopsis ==
Himefuji Kina and Tsuzumi, a lesbian couple who call themselves a "couple" rather than a "married couple", have just started living together. Kina's twin sister suddenly shows up, and another lesbian couple moves in next door, making the neighborhood lively, but Kina and Tsuzumi remain as lovey-dovey as ever.

== Publication ==
Written and illustrated by Minamoto Hisanari, Fu~Fu began serialization on December 18, 2009, in issue 11 of Comic Yuri Hime S. Fu~Fu moved to Comic Yuri Hime when Comic Yuri Hime S ceased publication in September 2010, and continued serialization until January 18, 2013. It was collected into two bound volumes.

Minamoto Hisanari has also published two Fu~Fu doujinshi, the first Fu-fu no Hon was by released Hisanari's personal circle, "Super Armadillo Club," on August 15, 2010, and serves as a prequel to the main story, depicting how Himefuji Kina and Tsuzumi first met in high school and how they became a couple. The second, Fu-fu 10th anniversary act1 was released on December 30, 2019, in celebrations for the series' 10th anniversary.

No.	Release date	ISBN
1	August 18, 2011	9784758071642
2	April 18, 2013	9784758072380

== Reception ==
Nicki Bauman notes that Fu~Fu one of the early examples of yuri's that focused on marriage, praising the series as a whole "this charming manga from the early 2000s celebrates the affectionate love and care two adult women have for each other, culminating in a magnificent wedding."

In Erica Friedman's review of the 10th anniversary doujinshi she reflected that "Fu~Fu was a romantic comedy, very much in the Moonphase house style, sweet with explanations of lesbian lives and why marriage equality ought to be a thing."
