= Superwomen in Love! Honey Trap and Rapid Rabbit =

Japanese manga series

- Cover of the first Japanese volume

ヒーローさんと元女幹部さん (Hero-san to Moto Onna Kanbu-san)
- Genre: Superhero, Yuri
- Manga
- Written by: sometime
- Published by: Ichijinsha
- English publisher: NA: Seven Seas Entertainment
- Magazine: Yuri Hime @ Pixiv
- Original run: October 8, 2018 – April 28, 2022
- Volumes: 5

Superwomen in Love! Honey Trap and Rapid Rabbit (ヒーローさんと元女幹部さん, Hīrō-san to Moto Onna Kanbu-san; lit. "Miss Hero and Miss Ex-General") is a Japanese yuri manga written and illustrated by sometime. Superwomen in Love! was serialized online at Yuri Hime @ Pixiv, the yuri manga magazine's official Pixiv platform. Before serialization it was published as a one-shot manga on the author's Twitter and Pixiv. It was licensed for an English-language release by Seven Seas Entertainment in 2020.

== Plot ==
Antinoid, an evil organization from another dimension, seeks to destroy the Earth with its kaijin monsters, but a transformed hero known as Rapid Rabbit stands in their way. The general Honey Trap is sent to eliminate Rapid Rabbit and comes close to finishing her off, but upon seeing Rapid Rabbit's true face, she falls in love with her at first sight. Kicked out of Antinoid as a result, Honey is rescued by the girl behind Rapid Rabbit, Hayate Honjou, and decides to join her in fighting Antinoid.

== Characters ==
Hayate Honjou (本城 颯, Honjō Hayate) / Rapid Rabbit (ラピッドラビット, Rapiddo Rabitto)
A girl who became a hero after picking up the R.R. Ring device that lets her transform. As Rapid Rabbit, she is able to move at high speeds.
Honey Trap (ハニィ・トラップ, Hanii Torappu)
A former general of Antinoid who was dispatched to defeat Rapid Rabbit, but was kicked out after falling in love with Hayate at first sight. In her transformed state, she is able to create various poisons to attack her opponents.
Melt Out (メルト・アウト, Meruto Auto)
A general of Antinoid who serves as its chief scientist, developing various devices and kaijin warriors. She is in a relationship with Kyouka.
Kyouka Suigetsu (キョーカ・スイゲツ, Kyōka Suigetsu)
A general of Antinoid who specialises in ninja and samurai techniques. Originally sent to Earth for recon, she ended up becoming an otaku and speaks like an old-fashioned samurai. She is in a relationship with Melt Out.
Cool Down (クール・ダウン, Kūru Daun)
A general of Antinoid who can utilise freezing techniques. She is obsessed with yuri and always carries around a yuri book.
X
The leader of Antinoid who, despite firing Honey, has feelings for her. She is able to transform into a form similar to Rapid Rabbit's.
Hina Fujigami (藤上 陽菜, Fujigami Hina) / Orb Owl (オーブアウル, Ōbu Auru)
A young girl who is very attached to her big sister Makoto. Similar to Hayate, she also finds a device that lets her transform into the hero Orb Owl, who uses projectile attacks.
Makoto Fujigami (藤上 真琴, Fujigami Makoto)
Hina's older sister, who is very protective of her little sister.
Moe Mitsuki (美月萌絵, Mitsuki Moe) / Reboot Rabbit (リブートラビット)
Melt and Kyouka's manufactured daughter, who believes herself to be a hero fighting with Antinoid as a team of justice. She can transform into Reboot Rabbit, which has various forms.

== Publication ==
No.	Original release date	Original ISBN	English release date	English ISBN
1	March 18, 2019	9784758079181	April 20, 2021	978-1-64827-109-0
2	December 18, 2019	9784758020664	August 17, 2021	978-1-64827-270-7
3	September 18, 2020	9784758021586	December 7, 2021	978-1-64827-370-4
4	June 30, 2021	9784758022644	July 5, 2022	978-1-63858-259-5
5	August 18, 2022	9784758024495	June 27, 2023	978-1-63858-722-4

== Reception ==
Erica Friedman of Yuricon praised the series for being "a light-hearted romp in the tropes of Japanese costumed superhero television shows. It requires little knowledge or commitment but is a lot of fun." It was also noted that the lettering in the English release was superlative and the translation led to an authentic reading experience.
