= My Girlfriend's Not Here Today =

Japanese manga series

- First tankōbon volume cover

今日はカノジョがいないから (Kyō wa Kanojo ga Inai kara)
- Genre: Drama; Yuri
- Manga
- Written by: Kiyoko Iwami
- Published by: Ichijinsha
- English publisher: NA: Seven Seas Entertainment
- Magazine: Comic Yuri Hime
- Original run: June 17, 2021 – present
- Volumes: 7

My Girlfriend's Not Here Today (Japanese: 今日はカノジョがいないから, Hepburn: Kyō wa Kanojo ga Inai kara) is a Japanese yuri manga series written and illustrated by Kiyoko Iwami. It has been serialized in Ichijinsha's Comic Yuri Hime since June 2021, and is licensed for an English-language release by Seven Seas Entertainment.

== Synopsis ==
Yuni and Nanase are dating in secret. While Yuni understands that her girlfriend is busy with volleyball club, she still gets lonely spending her time waiting for Nanase after school. To kill time Yuni posts about their relationship, and all the time she has to spare, on her secret social media account. However, when her classmate Fuuko discovers this account, Yuni finds herself being drawn into another secret relationship.

== Publication ==
Written and illustrated by Kiyoko Iwami, My Girlfriend's Not Here Today began serialization in Ichijinsha's Comic Yuri Hime on June 17, 2021. The series has been collected into seven tankōbon volumes as of March 18, 2026.

The series is licensed for an English release in North America by Seven Seas Entertainment.

No.	Original release date	Original ISBN	English release date	English ISBN
1	December 18, 2021	978-4-7580-2339-9	May 21, 2024	979-8-88843-827-5
Chapter 1: Contact; Chapter 2: Placation; Chapter 3: Misstep; Chapter 4: Whispers; Chapter 5: Fault; Bonus
2	August 18, 2022	978-4-7580-2450-1	September 24, 2024	979-8-89160-257-1
Chapter 6: Hope; Chapter 7: Relativity; Chapter 8: Misconduct; Chapter 9: Illusion; Chapter 10: Bloom; Bonus
3	February 16, 2023	978-4-7580-2499-0	January 7, 2025	979-8-89160-258-8
Chapter 11: Decadence; Chapter 12: Equivocation; Chapter 13: Reflection; Chapter 14: Astigmatism; Chapter 15: Addiction; Bonus
4	October 18, 2023	978-4-7580-2616-1	May 13, 2025	979-8-89160-951-8
Chapter 16: Consequence; Chapter 17: Tragedy; Chapter 18: Undergrowth; Chapter 19: Satellites; Chapter 20: Breakdown
5	July 18, 2024	978-4-7580-2730-4	September 23, 2025	979-8-89373-691-5
Chapter 21: Flux; Chapter 22: Trials; Chapter 23: Desiderata; Chapter 24: Yearning; Chapter 25: Kismet; Bonus
6	April 17, 2025	978-4-7580-2880-6	February 24, 2026	979-8-89765-215-0
Chapter 26: Collision; Chapter 27: Discord; Chapter 28: Divergence; Chapter 29: Discipline; Chapter 30: Flight; Bonus
7	March 18, 2026	978-4-7580-8983-8	—	—

== Reception ==
My Girlfriend's Not Here Today was nominated for the 2024 Next Manga Award in the print manga category, and won the Global Special Prize among English-speaking voters.
