= Our Teachers Are Dating! =

Japanese manga series

- Cover of the first Japanese volume

羽山先生と寺野先生は付き合っている (Hayama-sensei to Terano-sensei wa Tsukiatte iru)
- Genre: Romance, Yuri
- Manga
- Written by: Pikachi Ōi
- Published by: Ichijinsha
- English publisher: NA: Seven Seas Entertainment
- Magazine: Comic Yuri Hime
- Original run: June 18, 2018 – February 18, 2021
- Volumes: 4

Our Teachers Are Dating! (Japanese: 羽山先生と寺野先生は付き合っている, Hepburn: Hayama-sensei to Terano-sensei wa Tsukiatte iru; lit. 'Hayama-sensei and Terano-sensei Are Dating') is a Japanese yuri manga written and illustrated by Pikachi Ōi. Our Teachers Are Dating! was serialized in Ichijinsha's yuri manga magazine Comic Yuri Hime from 2018 to 2021 and was collected into four bound volumes. It was licensed for an English-language release by Seven Seas Entertainment in 2019.

== Plot ==
Azuka Hayama and Saki Terano, who fell in love for the first time as teachers, have just begun dating. They both have little experience with romantic relationships however with the help of their fellow teachers and students around them, they gradually deepened their relationship.

== Characters ==
Asuka Hayama (羽山 飛鳥, Hayama Asuka)
The home-room teacher in charge of class 1-A. Her main subject is physical education. Hayama's usual personality is serious and stiff, but in front of Terano, she sometimes shows a stubborn side.
Saki Terano (寺野 沙紀, Terano Saki)
Deputy home-room teacher for class 1-A. Her main subject is biology. Due to her small physique, she is often mistaken for a student or child when she is with Hayama.
Rui Bando (坂東 留衣, Bandō Rui)
A colleague of Hayama and Terano. Her main subject is Japanese. Rui is a himejoshi and is excited to learn about Hayama and Terano's new relationship and aims to support them.
Elena Miyazawa (宮沢 エレーナ, Miyazawa Erēna)
A colleague of Hayama and Terano. Her main subject is English. Miyazawa is often trying to find out how Hayama and Terano's relationship is progressing.

== Media ==
=== Manga ===
Our Teachers Are Dating! was licensed for an English-language release by Seven Seas Entertainment in 2019 as The Gym Teacher and School Nurse are Dating! but changed the title to its current name before the release of the first volume was released.

No.	Original release date	Original ISBN	English release date	English ISBN
1	December 18, 2018	9784758078917	September 22, 2020	978-1-64505-834-2
2	August 16, 2019	9784758079723	January 26, 2021	978-1-64505-846-5
3	June 18, 2020	9784758021272	March 23, 2021	978-1-64827-113-7
4	April 16, 2021	9784758022408	April 26, 2022	978-1-64827-285-1

== Reception ==
Anime News Network gave the first volume an overall B grade, praising how the "yuri aspect is handled so matter-of-factly that it is a non-factor in the story" though noting that the character development outside of how the protagonists relate to each other is weak. Erica Friedman of Yuricon also praised the series for showing Hayama and Terano's relationship being supported by all those around them without being up that they are both women, noting that "what we read this book and it's [sic] following volumes for is the sheer joy Hayama-sensei and Terano-sensei take in one another's company."
