= Koharu and Minato: Happy Life with My Girlfriend =

Japanese manga series

- Volume 1 Japanese Cover

小春と湊 わたしのパートナーは女の子 (Koharu to Minato: Watashi no Pātonā wa Onnanoko)
- Genre: Autobiographical; Slice of life; Yuri
- Manga
- Written by: Daruma; Hyaluron
- Published by: Ichijinsha
- English publisher: NA: Seven Seas Entertainment
- Imprint: Yuri Hime Comics
- Magazine: Comic Yuri Hime
- Original run: August 18, 2022 – present
- Volumes: 4

Koharu and Minato: Happy Life with My Girlfriend (Japanese: 小春と湊 わたしのパートナーは女の子, Hepburn: Koharu to Minato: Watashi no Pātonā wa Onnanoko; trans. Koharu and Minato: My Partner Is a Girl) is a Japanese manga series written and illustrated by Daruma and Hyaluron. It began serialization in Ichijinsha's Comic Yuri Hime magazine in August 2022.

== Synopsis ==
The series is based on the creators Daruma and Hyaluron's experiences being in a romantic relationship. Koharu Suzumura and Minato Matsuki are two people met online and started dating instantly despite their 10-year age gap.

== Publication ==
Written and illustrated by Daruma and Hyaluron, Koharu and Minato: My Partner Is a Girl began serialization in Ichijinsha's Comic Yuri Hime magazine on August 18, 2022. Its chapters have been collected into four wideban volumes as of July 2026.

In June 2025, Seven Seas Entertainment announced that they had licensed the series for English publication beginning in April 2026.

No.	Original release date	Original ISBN	North American release date	North American ISBN
1	July 18, 2023	978-4-7580-2582-9	April 14, 2026	979-8-89765-222-8
Chapters 1–10; Side Chapter; Extra: "The Couple's Home"
2	May 17, 2024	978-4-7580-2705-2	August 11, 2026	979-8-89765-223-5
Chapters 11–18; Extra: "The Couple's New Home"
3	June 18, 2025	978-4-7580-2913-1	December 15, 2026	979-8-89765-743-8
4	July 28, 2026	978-4-8251-0036-7	—	—

== Reception ==
The series was nominated for the eleventh Next Manga Awards in 2025 in the print category.
