= Love Beyond the Final Boss: The Hero's Quest for Love =

Japanese manga series

- First tankōbon volume cover

最強勇者パーティーは愛が知りたい (Saikyō Yūsha Pātī wa Ai ga Shiritai)
- Genre: Fantasy; Romantic comedy
- Manga
- Written by: Hadajuban Yamada
- Published by: Comic Smart (digital); Ichijinsha (print)
- English publisher: NA: Crossed Hearts
- Magazine: Ganma!
- Original run: August 31, 2023 – present
- Volumes: 6

Love Beyond the Final Boss: The Hero's Quest for Love (最強勇者パーティーは愛が知りたい, Saikyō Yūsha Pātī wa Ai ga Shiritai) is a Japanese manga series written and illustrated by Hadajuban Yamada. It began serialization on Comic Smart's Ganma! manga website in August 2023, with its volume releases handled by Ichijinsha.

== Synopsis ==
The series is set in a world where the demon lord was defeated by the strongest Hero Party. Itsuka Daihoma is an unpopular wizard in the Strongest Hero's Party, and hopes that the leader of his party, Shayu Sugoigoi, would kick him out of the party so he can build on his popularity. However, Shayu refuses to kick him out. During a meeting, it is later revealed that the Hero's Party overachieved in their defeat of the demon lord, so much so that it has led to previously summoned heroes wreaking havoc in the world.

== Publication ==
Written and illustrated by Hadajuban Yamada, Love Beyond the Final Boss: The Hero's Quest for Love began serialization on Comic Smart's Ganma! manga website on August 31, 2023. Its chapters have been compiled into six tankōbon volumes as of October 2026. Ichijinsha have released four print volumes as of November 2025.

During their panel at Anime NYC 2026, Crossed Hearts announced that it had licensed the series for English publication.

No.	Release date	ISBN
1	June 25, 2024	978-4-7580-2720-5
2	November 25, 2024	978-4-7580-2802-8
3	June 4, 2025	978-4-7580-2922-3
4	November 25, 2025	978-4-7580-2995-7
5	June 1, 2026	—
6	October 4, 2026	—

== Reception ==
The series was nominated for the tenth Next Manga Awards in 2024 in the web category.
