= Throw Away the Suit Together =

Japanese manga series

- First tankōbon volume cover, featuring Haru Nishimiya (left) and Megumi "Hii-chan" Hinoto (right)

君としらない夏になる (Kimi to Shiranai Natsu ni Naru)
- Genre: Romance; Yuri
- Manga
- Written by: Keyyang
- Published by: Ichijinsha
- English publisher: NA: Seven Seas Entertainment
- Magazine: Comic Yuri Hime
- Original run: August 18, 2021 – July 18, 2023
- Volumes: 3

Throw Away the Suit Together (Japanese: 君としらない夏になる, Hepburn: Kimi to Shiranai Natsu ni Naru) is a Japanese yuri manga series written and illustrated by Keyyang. It was serialized in Ichijinsha's Comic Yuri Hime from August 2021 to July 2023, and is licensed for an English-language release by Seven Seas Entertainment.

== Synopsis ==
The series follows Haru Nishimiya and Megumi "Hii-chan" Hinoto, tired of the idea of attending university or beginning job hunting, as they decide to throw away their resumes and move to a remote island together. However, they come to learn that even living out their days on an island still has its complications to face.

== Publication ==
Written and illustrated by Keyyang, Throw Away the Suit Together was serialized in Ichijinsha's Comic Yuri Hime from August 18, 2021, to July 18, 2023. The series was collected into three tankōbon volumes, released from March 17, 2022, to September 15, 2023.

The series is licensed for an English release in North America by Seven Seas Entertainment.

No.	Original release date	Original ISBN	English release date	English ISBN
1	March 17, 2022	978-4-7580-2378-8	July 16, 2024	979-8-88843-829-9
2	October 18, 2022	978-4-7580-2463-1	October 15, 2024	979-8-89160-303-5
3	September 15, 2023	978-4-7580-2596-6	February 4, 2025	979-8-89160-545-9

== Reception ==
Erica Friedman of Yuricon commented in her review of the first volume that the series was "one of my favorite reads currently in Comic Yuri Hime magazine right now." She noted that the art was "good, and bad" and that the constant strain of fan service may affect a reader's opinion of the series."
