= List of Teasing Master Takagi-san volumes =

Teasing Master Takagi-san is a Japanese manga series written and illustrated by Sōichirō Yamamoto. Twenty volumes have been published. The series also has four spin-offs, almost all of which have been collected in multiple tankōbon volumes.

== Teasing Master Takagi-san ==
Teasing Master Takagi-san is written by Sōichirō Yamamoto. The series began serialization in Shogakukan's shōnen manga magazine supplement Monthly Shōnen Sunday Mini on June 12, 2013, and it moved to the main Monthly Shōnen Sunday magazine on July 12, 2016. The series ended serialization on October 12, 2023. It has been collected in twenty tankōbon volumes. In November 2017, Yen Press announced the acquisition of the manga for an English release in North America.

No.	Original release date	Original ISBN	English release date	English ISBN
1	June 12, 2014	978-4-09-125015-5	July 24, 2018	978-1-9753-5330-8
1. "Eraser" (消しゴム, Keshigomu); 2. "Pool" (プール, Pūru); 3. "Making Faces" (変顔, Hengao); 4. "Strength Training" (筋トレ, Kintore); 5. "Empty Can" (空き缶, Akikan); 6. "Class Helper" (日直, Nitchoku); 7. "Umbrella" (傘, Kasa); 8. "Cold" (風邪, Kaze); 9. "Bookstore" (本屋さん, Honya-san)
Nishikata tries to surprise his seat-mate Takagi with a jack-in-the-box, but it backfires. Takagi gets Nishikata speculating whether the eraser she borrows from him has the name of her crush on it. Takagi has Nishikata guess why she is sitting out from swimming class. Nishikata tries to come up with the perfect silly face gesture that will make Takagi laugh in class. Takagi notices Nishikata has been exercising more, but it is because Nishikata punishes himself with ten pushups per tease. After getting teased about an indirect kiss from a drink can, Nishikata hurls the can across the street but it surprisingly lands in the trash bin. He then challenges Takagi on whether she can do that. Nishikata has class helper duties and suspects Takagi is hiding there to surprise him. Nishikata learns that Takagi forgot her umbrella, but Takagi turns it to a "sweetheart umbrella" sharing situation. Nishikata tries to use a retort on Takagi that he learned from a romantic comedy show. Takagi catches Nishikata secretly buying a rom-com manga. In the bonus chapter, Takagi's classmates ask if Takagi and Nishikata are a couple.
2	November 12, 2014	978-4-09-125527-3	October 30, 2018	978-1-9753-5366-7
10. "Rain Shelter" (雨宿り, Amayadori); 11. "Test Prep" (テスト勉強, Tesuto Benkyō); 12. "Tests Returned" (テスト返却, Tesuto Henkyaku); 13. "Letter" (手紙, Tegami); 14. "Cleaning Duty" (掃除当番, Sōji Tōban); 15. "Riding Double" (二人乗り, Futarinori); 16. "Arm Wrestling" (腕ずもう, Udezumō); 17. "Dream" (夢, Yume); Side Story: "Seat Change" (席替え, Sekigae) (Note: The side story "Seat Change" was originally published as a one-shot in Gessan magazine's July 2012 issue)
When Takagi and Nishikata wait out a rain storm, Takagi borrows Nishikata's gym shirt. Nishikata is studying in the library when Takagi joins him. They try to guess each other's test scores. Nishikata finds a letter in his book and wonders it is a love letter from Takagi. For disrupting class too much, Nishikata has to clean the science room; Takagi joins and wagers with rock-paper-scissors on who cleans which parts of the room. With summer break starting, Takagi wants Nishikata to "ride double", that is, bike with her sitting on the back. Takagi challenges Nishikata in arm wrestling. During a sleepy study hall, Nishikata tries to catch Takagi napping to play a prank on her. In the side story, Nishikata sends Takagi a note with fine print. In a bonus story, Mano and Nakai interact.
3	December 11, 2015	978-4-09-126650-7	January 22, 2019	978-1-9753-5367-4
18. "Test of Courage" (肝試し, Kimodameshi); 19. "Questions" (質問, Shitsumon); 20. "Comparing Heights" (背比べ, Sekurabe); 21. "Changing Seats" (席替え, Sekigae); 22. "English Translation" (英訳, Eiyaku); 23. "Back Hip Circles" (逆上がり, Gyaku Agari); 24. "Sides" (わき腹, Wakibara); 25. "Calligraphy" (習字, Shūji); 26. "Tailing" (尾行, Bikō)
Takagi and Nishikata explore an abandoned road tunnel for a test of courage. Nishikata tries to act cool like the television film character Dandy, then challenges Takagi to a game of asking questions. Nishikata and Takagi compare their heights. When the class changes seats, Nishikata wonders if he will still sit next to Takagi and whether he wants to. When Nishikata is distracted from answering the teacher's question, Takagi speculates whether it's because he's thinking too much of how to get back at her. Takagi and Nishikata compete in a back hip circle challenge on the chinup bar, but Takagi is wearing a skirt. Nishikata and Takagi try not to laugh but it might mean poking each other in a ticklish spot. In calligraphy class, Nishikata and Takagi have to pick a word to write out. Mina, Yukari, and Sanae follow Takagi and Nishikata and ponder what kind of relationship the two have.
4	October 12, 2016	978-4-09-127389-5	April 23, 2019	978-1-9753-5368-1
27. "Faucet" (水道, Suidō); 28. "Room" (部屋, Heya); 29. "The 21 Game" (21ゲーム, Nijūichi Gēmu); 30. "Fortunes" (占い, Uranai); 31. "The Invitation" (お誘い, Osasoi); 32. "Poker" (ポーカー, Pōkā); 33. "Cat" (ネコ, Neko); 34. "Cell Phone" (ケータイ, Kētai); 35. "Photos" (写真, Shashin)
After Takagi catches Nishikata tailing her, they walk to a water faucet at a park to clean off his scraped knee and cool their feet. Takagi visits Nishikata's room to help him with his homework. Takagi and Nishikata play the counting to 21 game. When Nishikata talks about his bad luck, Takagi shares that her love fortune says her current love will go well and asks if Nishikata has someone he likes. Takagi tries to get Nishikata to ask her to walk home together. Nishikata challenges Takagi to draw poker but he tries to cheat. After Nishikata struggles to pet a cat, Takagi does so without any problem. Nishikata gets a cell phone but struggles to ask Takagi for her cell phone contact info. Nishikata wants to take an embarrassing photo of Takagi.
5	February 10, 2017	978-4-09-127541-7	July 23, 2019	978-1-9753-5369-8
36. "Memories" (想い出, Omoide); 37. "Shopping" (買い物, Kaimono); 38. "Swimsuit" (水着, Mizugi); 39. "Marathon" (マラソン, Marason); 40. "Two-choice Quiz" (二択クイズ, Nitaku Kuizu); 41. "Coffee" (コーヒー, Kōhī); 42. "Typhoon" (台風, Taifū); 43. "Horror" (ホラー, Horā); 44. "Critical Hit" (クリティカル, Kuritikaru)
Takagi, 10 years later, is looking over her middle school graduation album with her daughter Chi, and then catches Chi trying to sneak a snack from a basket. Takagi finds Nishikata at the bookstore and guesses that he bought a certain manga volume. Nishikata tries to turn that situation into a wager, but loses the challenge, and as a result, has to help Takagi pick out a swimsuit. Nishikata challenges Takagi during their classes' long-distance run. After Nishikata chooses between two weird drinks, he and Takagi ask a series of two-choice questions. Nishikata buys a coffee drink in order to appear to be mature. Takagi catches Nishikata acting goofy in the midst of typhoon winds. Nishikata tries to shock Takagi with a scary video. Nishikata looks forward to a good fortune day according to his horoscope. In the bonus, Takagi gives Nishikata chocolate for Valentine's Day.
6	August 10, 2017; August 8, 2017 (SE)	978-4-09-127735-0; 978-4-09-941894-6 (SE)	November 19, 2019	978-1-9753-3170-2
45. "Date" (デート, Dēto); 46. "Rock Kicking" (石蹴り, Ishikeri); 47. "Portraits" (似顔絵, Nigaoe); 48. "Water Slide 1" (ウォータースライダー①, Wōtā Suraidā 1); 49. "Water Slide 2" (ウォータースライダー②, Wōtā Suraidā 2); 50. "Water Slide 3" (ウォータースライダー③, Wōtā Suraidā 3); 51. "Treasure Hunt" (宝探し, Takara Sagashi); 52. "Worry" (お悩み, Onayami); 53. "Eyedrops" (目薬, Megusuri)
Nishikata and Takagi stop by a convenience store to have some cup noodle, but Nishikata struggles with saying they are not on a date when their classmates drop by. Nishikata challenges Takagi on who can get their rock to the vending machine with the fewest number of kicks. Nishikata and Takagi draw each other's portraits for art class. At the water park, Mano shares with Takagi how she wants to ride the water slide with Nakai, while Nishikata learns that Nakai has been putting that off because it is too embarrassing. Nishikata and Takagi meet up and follow Mano and Nakai who go down the slide together. Nishikata and Takagi follow a treasure hunting map. Nishikata plans to scare Takagi with a new jack-in-a-box but notices Takagi is not teasing him as usual. Takagi uses eye drops on Nishikata. In the bonus, Yukari suspects Nishikata and Takagi are kissing, and asks Houjou to confirm.
7	December 12, 2017; December 8, 2017 (SE)	978-4-09-128062-6; 978-4-09-943002-3 (SE)	January 21, 2020	978-1-9753-5938-6
54. "Entrance Ceremony" (入学式, Nyūgakushiki); 55. "Sports Tests" (スポーツテスト, Supōtsutesuto); 56. "Souvenir" (お土産, Omiyage); 57. "Hypnotism" (催眠術, Saiminjutsu); 58. "Sweet Rice Cake" (大福, Daifuku); 59. "T-shirt" (Tシャツ, Tīshatsu); 60. "Lottery" (宝くじ, Takarakuji); 61. "Textbook" (教科書, Kyōkasho); 62. "Promise" (約束, Yakusoku)
In a flashback, Nishikata is late for the first day of middle school, and this sets up his encounter with Takagi. Nishikata and Takagi challenge each other on who can score more points on their physical fitness tests. Nishikata gets Takagi a box of candy as a souvenir hoping to trick her into eating one and finding that it is sour, but Takagi really appreciates his gift. Nishikata tries to hypnotize Takagi using a swinging coin, and it seems to put her into a trance. Nishikata wants to eat a sweet rice cake but Takagi gets him to wager that in a challenge. Nishikata doesn't want to show Takagi his T-shirt. When Nishikata's classmate wins a small prize at a lottery, Takagi asks Nishikata what he would do if he won the jackpot. When Nishikata forgets his textbook, so Takagi offers to share hers, but Nishikata runs around the school in search for another copy. Nishikata wants to sneak up to Takagi on his bike but is caught. They talk about summer homework and Takagi offers to do theirs together.
8	February 9, 2018; February 7, 2018 (SE)	978-4-09-128152-4; 978-4-09-943003-0 (SE)	April 21, 2020	978-1-9753-5939-3
63. "Valentine 1" (バレンタイン①, Barentain 1); 64. "Valentine 2" (バレンタイン②, Barentain 2); 65. "Kendama" (けん玉); 66. "Bicycle" (自転車, Jitensha); 67. "Nurse's Office" (保健室, Hokenshitsu); 68. "Gym Shed" (体育倉庫, Taiiku Sōko); 69. "Snowmen" (雪だるま, Yukidaruma); 70. "Ice" (氷, Kōri); 71. "Skipping Rocks" (水切り, Mizukiri)
Nishikata wonders if he will get any chocolate from girls for Valentine's Day, especially Takagi. Mano struggles to give Nakai her chocolate gift especially when their P.E. teacher is confiscating the gifts of anyone who does so. Nishikata pretends to be bad at playing kendama and then challenges Takagi to try it. Nishikata tries to guess why Takagi left her bike at home. When Takagi treats Nishikata's wound at the nurse's office, they play a game where Nishikata must not say "ouch". Nishikata tries to trick Takagi into believing they are locked inside the gym shed. Nishikata and Takagi challenge each other on who can make the better snowman. Nishikata and Takagi have a challenge on who can carry the biggest block of ice on their way to school without breaking it. Nishikata and Takagi challenge each other on stone skipping. In the bonus, Takagi gives Nishikata chocolate for Valentine's Day.
9	June 12, 2018	978-4-09-128330-6; 978-4-09-943016-0 (SE)	August 18, 2020	978-1-9753-5940-9
72. "Indirect Kisses" (間接キス, Kansetsu Kisu); 73. "Sneezes" (くしゃみ, Kushami); 74. "Hide and Seek" (かくれんぼ, Kakurenbo); 75. "Year's End 1" (年末①, Nenmatsu 1); 76. "Year's End 2" (年末②, Nenmatsu 2); 77. "Texts" (メール, Mēru); 78. "Steps" (歩数, Hosū); 79. "Looks" (外見, Gaiken); 80. "Dodgeball" (ドッジボール, Dojjibōru)
Nishikata and Takagi only have enough money to buy one drink; they have a challenge over whether Nishikata would be embarrassed over having an indirect kiss. The kids talk about whether their sneezes means someone is talking about them. Nishikata and Takagi play hide and seek but then they notice Hamaguchi and Houjou arriving and sitting together. With the last school day of the year, Nishikata and Takagi talk about gifts, and then have a challenge about whoever makes the other person happier wins. Nishikata and Takagi send each other text messages. Nishikata and Takagi challenge each other on how many steps it would take to walk to a telephone pole far away. Nishikata challenges Takagi to find what is different about his appearance. Nishikata and Takagi play one-on-one dodgeball. In the bonus manga, Takagi gives Nishikata another gift.
10	February 12, 2019	978-4-09-128860-8; 978-4-09-943042-9 (SE)	November 24, 2020	978-1-9753-5941-6
81. "Nishikata" (西片); 82. "Vertical Messages" (縦読み, Tateyomi); 83. "Dog" (犬, Inu); 84. "Cookies" (クッキー, Kukkī); 85. "April Fools' Day" (エイプリルフール, Eipurirufūru); 86. "Rematch" (リベンジ, Ribenji); 87. "Fishing" (釣り, Tsuri); 88. "Box" (箱, Hako); 89. "Names" (呼び方, Yobikata)
An alternate reality shows Takagi always losing to Nishikata, including playing the 21 game. Nishikata tries to sneak a vertical message to Takagi, but she catches it immediately. Nishikata challenges Takagi to pet a neighborhood dog. Nishikata wonders if cookies taste better if they're made by someone you like, and plays Takagi for a chance to do that. For April Fools' Day, Nishikata tries to trick Takagi at the candy store when Takagi asks Nishikata not to lie anymore for the day. Nishikata and Takagi compete in another sports test including a grip strength test. Nishikata and Takagi compete in a fishing contest. Takagi guesses what is inside Nishikata's box without tearing the box or using tools. After Tsukimoto refers to Kimura without honorifics, Nishikata wonders if he can use that on Takagi. The bonus manga has another case where Takagi is going to give Nishikata a chocolate gift.
11	July 4, 2019	978-4-09-943054-2; 978-4-09-129287-2 (SE)	June 1, 2021	978-1-9753-2493-3
90. "Changing Uniforms" (衣替え, Koromogae); 91. "Bag Inspections" (持ちもの検査, Mochimono Kensa); 92. "Made You Look" (あっちむいてほい, Atchi Muite Hoi); 93. "Sunburn" (日焼け, Hiyake); 94. "Fan" (うちわ, Uchiwa); 95. "Candy" (アメ, Ame); 96. "Library Committee Members" (図書委員, Tosho Iin); 97. "Crochet" (編み物, Amimono); 98. "Jealousy" (嫉妬, Shitto)
After realizing they are wearing different season school uniforms, Nishikata and Takagi have a contest where if Takagi says that it's cold she loses. They practice conducting bag inspections on each other. They have a "made you look" contest. Takagi has Nishikata guess why she called him out today, otherwise she can poke at his sunburned body. They have a contest on who can move an eraser farther using a hand fan. They challenge on who would flinch from eating a piece of candy that is either sweet or spicy. When the two of them are assigned to the library committee, Takagi has them choose books for each other to read. Takagi does some crochet and invites Nishikata to try. Mano asks Takagi for advice on how to get Nakai to ask her to walk home with her; Takagi suggests making him jealous by talking with another guy so Mano tries it with Nishikata. The bonus is another story where Takagi gives Nishikata chocolate.
12	December 12, 2019	978-4-09-129526-2	December 14, 2021	978-1-9753-2494-0
99. "Year 2 Students" (2年生, Ninensei); 100. "Crane Game" (クレーンゲーム, Kurēngēmu); 101. "Grip Trainer" (握力のやつ, Akuryoku no Yatsu); 102. "Dislikes" (苦手なモノ, Nigate na Mono); 103. "UFO"; 104. "Blood Type" (血液型, Ketsuekigata); 105. "Fortunes" (おみくじ, Omikuji); 106. "Return Present" (お返し, Okaeshi); 107. "Night" (夜, Yoru)
Takagi looks at the class rosters and has Nishikata try to guess if they're going to be in the same class by her reaction. When Takagi catches Nishikata playing a crane game; Nishikata pretends to be going for a different prize. Takagi remarks how Nishikata is using hand grippers in class. After Takagi guesses correctly that Nishikata dislikes peppers in his food, Nishikata tries to guess what Takagi dislikes. Takao tries to show off a UFO picture but it looks like it was just something thrown in the air; Nishikata tries to create a similar one with Takagi. After they notice the mosquitoes are only biting Nishikata, he tries to guess Takagi's blood type. Nishikata challenges Takagi to draw fortune slips out of a bag. For Valentine's Day, after giving Nishikata some obligation chocolate, she slips a bigger chocolate gift in Nishikata's shoe locker. For White Day, Nishikata tries to find the right time and place to give her the return gift. Nishikata goes to the public baths, hoping that Takagi might be there later. As they walk home at night, they have a contest as to who would get embarrassed and turn red first.
13	March 12, 2020	978-4-09-850034-5; 978-4-09-943065-8 (SE)	January 18, 2022	978-1-9753-2495-7
108. "Presence" (気配, Kehai); 109. "Wish" (願掛け, Gankake); 110. "Walk" (散歩, Sanpo); 111. "Appraisal Game" (値段当てゲーム, Nedan Ate Gēmu); 112. "Left Item" (忘れもの, Wasuremono); 113. "Ocean Swim" (海水浴, Kaisuiyoku); 114. "Diabolical Patch" (魔球, Makyū); 115. "Evening Sun" (夕日, Yūhi); 116. "Glico" (グリコ, Guriko)
Nishikata and Takagi try to follow each other without being spotted. Nishikata tries to get around without touching any of the roadway; Takagi has him try to do that as they go to a shrine. Nishikata goes dog walking with Takagi. After guessing some prices from watching a television show, Nishikata challenges Takagi in appraising the value of their school items. Nishikata forgets his homework so he and Takagi return to school, but Nishikata gets self-conscious that the school is full of couples hanging out. The gang go to the beach and the guys wonder what the girls are doing. Inspired by a baseball manga, Nishikata offers to pitch a ball to Takagi to hit. When Takagi sees Nishikata running, Nishikata gets inspired to run all the way out to the beach. Nishikata and Takagi play a rock-paper-scissors game with a Glico variant.
14	August 12, 2020	978-4-09-850210-3	March 29, 2022	978-1-9753-3359-1
117. "Detour" (寄り道, Yorimichi); 118. "Lunch" (お弁当, Obentō); 119. "New Year's Shrine Visit" (初詣で, Hatsumōde); 120. "Rain" (雨, Ame); 121. "Confession" (告白, Kokuhaku); 122. "Type" (タイプ, Taipu); 123. "Advice" (相談, Sōdan); 124. "Rental DVDs" (レンタルDVD, Rentaru Dī Bui Dī")
Nishikata takes Takagi up a long flight of stairs and then challenges her to guess the number of steps. As the location is related to a romance urban legend, Hamaguchi and Houjou also take the stairs, as well as Mano and Nakai. When Nishikata's guy friends are absent, he has to eat alone until Takagi joins him. Nishikata and Takagi visit the new year's shrine and make a challenge on who gets the better fortune. Nishikata forgets his umbrella on a rainy day so he borrows one but then returns to school because he suspects Takagi might not have one. Hamaguchi wants to confess to Houjou, but he wants the other guys to confess to the girls they hang out with first. Takagi asks Nishikata what is his favorite type of girl, and starts acting like the one in the rom-com manga they are following. Houjou asks Nishikata what kind of gift Hamaguchi would like, leading Takagi to ask the same. Takagi and Nishikata pick DVDs for each other to watch.
15	February 12, 2021	978-4-09-850449-7; 978-4-09-943082-5 (SE)	August 16, 2022	978-1-9753-4674-4
125. "Rankings" (ランキング, Rankingu); 126. "Paper Airplane" (紙ヒコーキ, Kami Hikōki); 127. "Scene" (シーン, Shiin); 128. "Marriage" (けっこん, Kekkon); 129. "Bean-Throwing" (豆まき, Mamemaki); 130. "Chorus" (サビ, Sabi); 131. "Reflexes" (反射神経, Hanshashinkei); 132. "Lost Item" (落としもの, Otoshimono); 133. "Kindness" (やさしさ, Yasashisa)
A younger Nishikata plays a video arcade game, filling up the high scores, only to notice later another person with the initials TKG taking over the high score list; he and Takagi play the game years later. Nishikata tries to make a paper airplane that when thrown will return. Takagi has Nishikata try to re-enact an embarrassing romance scene from their favorite rom-com manga. Nishikata challenges Takagi on which of their teachers is getting married. Nishikata challenges Takagi to a bean-throwing contest. The two try to remember how the theme song goes for a show they watched. They play rock-paper-scissors with the winner trying to hit the loser on the head with a paper fan. Nishikata tries to show off his maturity by having his own house key but he loses it so he and Takagi search together for it. They walk together to buy a fanbook of their favorite manga, but stop to help some kids out instead.
16	September 10, 2021	978-4-09-850691-0	December 13, 2022	978-1-9753-4676-8
134. "Cooking Class" (調理実習, Chōri Jisshū); 135. "True or False" (ウソとホン, Uso to Honto); 136. "Changing Class" (移動教室, Idō Kyōshitsu); 137. "Eyesight Contest" (視力勝負, Shiryoku Shōbu); 138. "Behind the School" (校舎裏, Kōsha Ura); 139. "Exchange Diary" (交換日記, Kōkan Nikki); 140. "Chocolate" (チョコ, Choko); 141. "Slight Fever" (微熱, Binetsu); 142. "Graduation Ceremony" (卒業式, Sotsugyōshiki)
Takagi, Nishikata and friends have a cooking class. Takagi easily reads whenever Nishikata is lying. Nishikata challenges Takagi on whoever can make it to their next class the fastest and without running in the halls. The two challenge each other to read an eye chart. Nishikata wants to ask Takagi to help him practice singing. Takagi asks Nishikata if they want to start an exchange diary. Hamaguchi speculates on getting custom-made chocolate from Houjou. Nishikata tries to hide the fact that he has a fever, but Takagi makes it a challenge. The two talk about what it would be like when they graduate.
17	January 12, 2022	978-4-09-850848-8	April 18, 2023	978-1-9753-6032-0
143. "Secret Base" (ひみつきち, Himitsu Kichi); 144. "Deduction Game" (推理ゲーム, Suiri Gēmu); 145. "The 'Don't Say the Word' Game" (NGワードゲーム, NG Wādo Gēmu); 146. "Consideration" (気遣い, Kidzukai); 147. "Sharing" (おすそわけ, Osusowake); 148. "Manly Back" (男の背中, Otoko no Senaka); 149. "Good Faith" (誠実さ, Seijitsu-sa); 150. "Strength" (力の使い方, Chikara no Tsukaikata); 151. "Button" (ボタン, Botan)
Nishikata looks for the secret base he and his friends used to make; Takagi makes a new one. They play a short version of 20 questions. They play the "Don't Say the Word" game. Houjou was going to deliver food to her grandfather when Hamaguchi spots her in a dressed down state. They have to write an essay in English about what they like. They play a card picking game. Nishikata lifts something but breaks a window, so he has to clean up; Takagi challenges him to try to lift something in the room. Takagi offers to sew Nishikata's shirt buttons.
18	June 8, 2022	978-4-09-851171-6; 978-4-09-943113-6 (SE)	February 20, 2024	978-1-9753-7358-0
152. "Time Capsule" (タイムカプセル, Taimu Kapuseru); 153. "Shadow Puppets" (影絵, Kagee); 154. "Lottery" (福引き, Fukubiki); 155. "Snacking" (かいぐい, Kaigui); 156. "Errand" (おつかい, Otsukai); 157. "Bus" (バス, Basu); 158. "The One Who Waits" (待ち人, Machibito); 159. "Sketching" (写生, Shasei); 160. "Beauty" (キレイなもの, Kireina Mono)
19	March 10, 2023	978-4-09-851763-3; 978-4-09-943127-3 (SE)	May 28, 2024	978-1-9753-8976-5
161. "Hairstyle" (髪型, Kamigata); 162. "Hop, Hop" (ケンケン, Kenken); 163. "Experience" (経験, Keiken); 164. "House Call" (お見舞い, Omimai); 165. "Yukari's Valentine" (ユカリのバレンタイン, Yukari no Barentain); 166. "Choosing Committees" (委員会決め, Iinkai Kime); 167. "Birthday" (待誕生日, Tanjōbi); 168. "Touch" (タッチ, Tatchi); 169. "First Names" (名前, Namae)
20	January 12, 2024	978-4-09-853097-7; 978-4-09-943148-8 (SE)	March 25, 2025	979-8-8554-1072-3
170. "Swings" (ブランコ, Buranko); 171. "Paper Sumo" (紙相撲, Kamizumo); 172. "Karaoke" (カラオケ); 173. "Staying Up Late" (夜更かし, Yofukashi); 174. "The Theory of Relativity" (相対性理論, Sōtaiseiriron); 175. "Liking Someone" (好きということ, Suki to Iu Koto); 176. "Amulet" (おまもり, Omamori); 177. "Lines" (セリフ, Serifu); 178. "Summer Festival" (夏祭り, Natsumatsuri)

== Ashita wa Doyōbi ==
A spin-off manga series, titled Ashita wa Doyōbi (あしたは土曜日; lit. "Tomorrow is Saturday"), was serialized in the newspaper Yomiuri Chūkōsei Shimbun from November 7, 2014, to November 2015, and was collected into two tankōbon volumes. It was also adapted within the Teasing Master Takagi-san anime adaptation in 2018.

No.	Release date	ISBN
1	November 12, 2015	978-4-09-126659-0
1. Hajimemashite (はじめまして); 2. Janken (じゃんけん); 3. Kētai (ケータイ); 4. Koromogae (衣替え); 5. Tokugi (特技); 6. Kōhī (コーヒー); 7. Mayuge (まゆ毛); 8. Konomi (好み); 9. Kami Kukuri (髪くくり); 10. Kendama (けん玉); 11. Geppu (ゲップ); 12. Daietto (ダイエット); 13. Neko (ネコ); 14. Neko Kyūshutsu (ネコ救出); 15. Zense (前世); 16. Medamayaki (目玉焼き); 17. Tesuto (テスト); 18. Natsuyasumi Shonichi (夏休み初日); 19. Umi (海); 20. Jiyukenkyū (自由研究); 21. Hanabi (花火); 22. Shukudai (宿題); 23. Taifū (台風); 24. Kantameshi (肝試し); Extra: Aruite Gekō (歩いて下校)
2	February 12, 2016	978-4-09-126660-6
25. Fuyufuku (冬服); 26. Inu (犬); 27. Onigiri (おにぎり); 28. Soramoyō (空模様); 29. Shukudai Wasure (宿題忘れ); 30. Gyōza (ギョーザ); 31. Nagagutsu (長ぐつ); 32. Niramekko (にらめっこ); 33. Ame (に雨); 34. Neoki (寝起き); 35. Kaigui (買い食い); 36. Tsuiseki (追跡); 37. Shinchō (身長); 38. Aki (秋); 39. Otonappoku (大人っぽく); 40. San Renkyū (3連休); 41. Maegami (前髪); 42. Marason (マラソン); 43. Hyaku-en (百円); 44. Samu Gari (寒がり); 45. Kurisumasu (クリスマス); 46. Oshōgatsu (お正月); 47. Bukatsu (部活); 48. Kotatsu (こたつ); 49. Yuki (雪); 50. Barentain (バレンタイン); 51. Tensū (点数); 52. Mata Ashita (またあした)

== Koi ni Koisuru Yukari-chan ==
A second spin-off manga series, titled Koi ni Koisuru Yukari-chan (恋に恋するユカリちゃん; lit. "Yukari-chan in Love with Love"), was serialized in Monthly Shōnen Sunday from July 12, 2017, to April 11, 2020, and was collected into five tankōbon volumes.

No.	Release date	ISBN
1	February 9, 2018	978-4-09-128187-6
1. Koibana (恋バナ); 2. Uranai (占い); 3. Kekkon (結婚); 4. Natsumatsuri (夏祭り); 5. Taifū no Asa (台風の朝); 6. Yōfuku (洋服); 7. Undōkai Gokko (運動会ごっこ); 8. Otomarikai (お泊まり会); 9. Machiawase (待ち合わせ); 10. Utatane (うたた寝); 11. Kisu no Aji (キスの味)
2	July 12, 2018	978-4-09-128403-7
12. Hatsumōde (初詣); 13. Barentain (バレンタイン); 14. Howaitodē (ホワイトデー); 15. Badominton (バドミントン); 16. Neko Masutā (ネコマスター); 17. Hōtai (包帯); 18. Chōsen (挑戦); 19. Udezumō (腕ずもう); 20. Kagami Moji (鏡文字); 21. Tesuto Benkyō (テスト勉強); Extra: "Karakai Jōzu no Takagi-san" OVA Afurekorepōto (「からかい上手の高木さん」OVAアフレコレポート)
3	February 12, 2019	978-4-09-128876-9
22. Kasa (傘); 23. Tegami (手紙); 24. Omajinai (おまじない); 25. Pūru (プール); 26. Hokenshitsu (保健室); 27. Shūji (習字); 28. Denwa (電話); 29. Harōin (ハロウィン); 30. Aki Sonogo (秋 その後); 31. Obentō (お弁当); 32. Sekigae (席替え); Extra: Azushima ni Ittekimashita Repōto (小豆島に行ってきましたレポート)
4	December 12, 2019	978-4-09-129528-6
33. Mochitsuki (もちつき); 34. Marason (マラソン); 35. Mamemaki (豆まき); 36. Nigaoe (似顔絵); 37. Sukinshippu (スキンシップ); 38. Sakura (桜); 39. Maegami (前髪); 40. Ōgata Renkyū (大型連休); 41. Saiminjutsu (催眠術); 42. Jūnburaido (ジューンブライド); Extra: Shin'ei Dōga Sen'nyū Repōto Zenpen (シンエイ動画潜入レポート 前編); Extra: Shin'ei Dōga Sen'nyū Repōto Kōhen (シンエイ動画潜入レポート 後編)
5	August 12, 2020	978-4-09-850214-1
43. Koromogae (衣替え); 44. Mochi Mono Kensa (持ちもの検査); 45. Tosho Iin (図書委員); 46. Hyaku Pāsento Kataomoi Futari no Baai (100%片想い・2人の場合); 47. Mukashi Asobi (むかし遊び); 48. Supōtsutesuto (※ Ninensei) (スポーツテスト(※2年生)); 49. Janken Asobi (じゃんけん遊び); 50. Mushiba (虫歯); 51. Omikuji no Uragawa (おみくじの裏側); 52. "UFO"; 53. Ame (雨); 54. Shashin (写真); Extra: Yonkoma Manga (4コマ漫画); Extra: Koi ni Koisuru Yukari-chan Repōto (恋に恋するユカリちゃんレポート)

== Karakai Jōzu no (Moto) Takagi-san ==
A third spin-off, titled Karakai Jōzu no (Moto) Takagi-san (からかい上手の（元）高木さん; lit. "Teasing Master (Former) Takagi-san"), featuring an adult Takagi, now married to Nishikata, and their daughter, Chi, was serialized on the MangaONE app from July 15, 2017, to July 24, 2024. It has been collected into twenty-three tankōbon volumes.

No.	Release date	ISBN
1	December 12, 2017	978-4-09-128070-1
1. Onamae (お名前); 2. Okaimono (お買い物); 3. Sukikirai (好き嫌い); 4. Okatadzuke (お片づけ); 5. Kakurenbo (かくれんぼ); 6. Jitensha (自転車); 7. Otōsan (お父さん); 8. Kōen (公園); 9. Horā (ホラー); 10. Ikidome (息とめ); 11. Pūru (プール); 12. Dorodango (どろだんご); 13. Nage-gui (投げ食い); Bonus: Omake (おまけ)
2	February 9, 2018	978-4-09-127675-9
14. Tsuntsun (つんつん); 15. Amenbo (アメンボ); 16. Sōmen (そうめん); 17. Momotarō (ももたろう); 18. Karakau (からかう); 19. Rūpu (ループ); 20. Sentakubutsu (洗濯物); 21. Doraibu (ドライブ); 22. Kowaimono (怖いもの); 23. Kōhī (コーヒー); 24. Oekaki (お絵かき); 25. Kakurenbo (かくれんぼ); 26. Kurisumasu (クリスマス); Bonus: Janken (じゃんけん)
3	July 12, 2018	978-4-09-128402-0
27. Hōfu (ほーふ); 28. Janken (じゃんけん); 29. Hamigaki (ばみがき); 30. Barentain (バレンタイン); 31. Ban Gohan (晩ごはん); 32. Nukumori (ぬくもり); 33. Hirune (昼寝); 34. Nawatobi (なわとび); 35. Mamagoto (ままごと); 36. Nimotsu Mochi (荷物持ち); 37. Kichi (吉); 38. Katatataki (肩たたき); 39. Gomibako (ごみ箱); Bonus: Otōsan ga Katte ni (おとーさんが勝手に)
4	February 12, 2019	978-4-09-128875-2
40. Kendama (けんだま); 41. Dotchi (どっち); 42. Gaman (がまん); 43. Obentō (お弁当); 44. Nomimono (のみもの); 45. Kurōbā (クローバー); 46. Oheso (おへそ); 47. Teru Teru Bōzu (てるてるぼーず); 48. Futari Nori (ふたりのり); 49. Ka (蚊); 50. Shiroppu (シロップ); 51. Kappurāmen (カップラーメン); 52. Zōjiki (掃除機); 53. Tsumiki (積み木); 54. Katamomi (肩もみ); Bonus: Omake (おまけ)
5	March 12, 2019	978-4-09-129085-4
55. Koemane (こえまね); 56. Takarasagashi (宝さがし); 57. Tatchi (タッチ); 58. Kasabuta (かさぶた); 59. Kauntaun (かうんたうん); 60. Taifū (たいふう); 61. Pīman (ピーマン); 62. Densha (でんしゃ); 63. Wasuremono (わすれもの); 64. Ī ko (いい子); 65. Zonbi (ゾンビ); 66. Pairētsu (ピラッ); 67. Karashi (からし)
6	July 4, 2019	978-4-09-129286-5
68. Hittsuki Mushi (ひっつきむし); 69. Mikan (ミカン); 70. Tsurī (ツリー); 71. Santa-san (サンタさん); 72. O Osōji (おおそうじ); 73. Sensei (せんせい); 74. Ketsuro (けつろ); 75. Mamemaki (まめまき); 76. Uwaki (うわき); 77. Mushi-san (むしさん); 78. Harigami (はりがみ); 79. Ishikeri (いしけり); 80. Bikō (びこう)
7	November 12, 2019	978-4-09-129465-4
81. Nekutai (ネクタイ); 82. Osake (おさけ); 83. Oru su ban (おるすばん); 84. O Mamagoto (おままごと); 85. Kamigata (かみがた); 86. Oshi-goto (おしごと); 87. Ishi (いし); 88. Sumaho (スマホ); 89. Kyara-ben (キャラ弁); 90. Ishinage (いしなげ); 91. O Yome-san (およめさん); 92. Rabu Retā (ラブレター); 93. O Naidoshi (おないどし)
8	January 10, 2020	978-4-09-129570-5
94. Mahō (まほう); 95. Ofuro (おふろ); 96. Binetsu (びねつ); 97. Mizugi (みずぎ); 98. Yōji (用事); 99. Kega (けが); 100. Ukiwa (うきわ); 101. Niramekko (にらめっこ); 102. Suraidā (スライダー); 103. Senpūki (せんぷーき); 104. Kyōryū (きょーりゅー); 105. Shashin (しゃしん); 106. Nyūgakushiki (入学式); Bonus: Omake (おまけ)
9	August 12, 2020	978-4-09-850212-7
107. Chigai (ちがい); 108. Hen'na ke (へんなけ); 109. Aiai ga sa (あいあいがさ); 110. Yakyū (野球); 111. Haroīn (はろいーん); 112. Omise-yasan (おみせやさん); 113. Dojjibōru (ドッジボール); 114. Sakusen (作戦); 115. Kura Yami (くらやみ); 116. Nade Nade (なでなで); 117. Zenkutsu (ぜんくつ); Bonus: Omake (おまけ)
10	August 12, 2020	978-4-09-850216-5
118. Okashi (おかし); 119. Yume (ゆめ); 120. O Mochi (お餅); 121. Takarakuji (宝くじ); 122. Rimeiku (リメイク); 123. Kōri (こおり); 124. Gyu (ぎゅー); 127. Motemote (モテモテ); 128. Inu (いぬ); 129. Tokoshan (とこしゃん); 130. Te (て); 131. Terebi (テレビ); Bonus: Omake (おまけ)
11	February 12, 2021	978-4-09-850450-3
130. Okaeshi (お返し); 131. Sakaagari (さかあがり); 132. Kushami (くしゃみ); 133. Abekobe (あべこべ); 134. Gatan Goton (ガタンゴトン); 135. Hosu (ほすー); 136. Kyōryoku (協力); 137. Toire (トイレ); 138. Usagi (うさぎ); 139. Onigiri (おにぎり); 140. Tsuri (つり); 141. Hoi (ほいっ); Bonus: Omake (おまけ)
12	September 10, 2021	978-4-09-850692-7
142. Amayadori (雨宿り); 143. Akuryoku (握力); 144. Kekkon (けっこん); 145. Shiawase (幸せ); 146. Chichi no Hi (父の日); 147. Kami do me (かみどめ); 148. Kureyon (クレヨン); 149. Pata Pata (パタパタ); 150. UFO; 151. Kusuguri (くすぐり); 152. Nemui (ねむい); 153. Gēmu (ゲーム); 154. Piza (ぴざ); 155. Nami (なみ)
13	November 12, 2021	978-4-09-850796-2
156. Hiyake (ひやけ); 157. Obake (おばけ); 158. Tsui Teru (ツイてる); 159. Fūsen (ふうせん); 160. Janpu (じゃんぷ); 161. Yūhi (夕日); 162. Sagashi Mono (さがしもの); 163. Shinpai (しんぱい); 164. Monban (もんばん); 165. Hako (はこ); 166. Hitoriji me (ひとりじめ); 167. Chū (ちゅー); 168. Koromogae (ころもあえ); 169. Batta (バッタ)
14	January 12, 2022	978-4-09-850847-1
170. Mono Mane (ものまね); 171. Mafurā (マフラー); 172. Purezento (プレゼント); 173. Awaten bō (あわてんぼう); 174. Daichiki (だいちき); 175. Hakusen (はくせん); 176. Renshū (れんしゅー); 177. Kobanare (子離れ); 178. Ni mo Tsukensa (にもつけんさ); 179. Senkai (せんかい); 180. Tamago (たまご); 181. Anshin (安心); 182. Arigato (ありがとー); 183. Tsuki (月)
15	February 10, 2022	978-4-09-850849-5
184. Kukkī (クッキー); 185. Furagu (フラグ); 186. Usa-chan (うさちゃん); 187. Netabare (ネタバレ); 188. Meiseki Yume (明晰夢); 189. Kami Hikōki (かみヒコーキ); 190. O hime-sama (おひめさま); 191. Saimin-jutsu (催眠術); 192. Aidoru (アイドル); 193. Mika Taken (みかたけん); 194. Dekkai (でっかい); 195. Kuchi Paku (口パク); 196. Kinshi (禁止); 197. Kasa (かさ)
16	June 8, 2022	978-4-09-851170-9
198. Aisu (アイス); 199. Dotchi ni (どっち似); 200. Kyō Koso (今日こそ); 201. Yubiwa (指輪); 202. Yoru no Kōen (夜の公園); 203. Warui ko (わるいこ); 204. Tearaiu Gai (てあらいうがい); 205. Nōto (ノート); 206. Romanchikku (ロマンチック); 207. Uta (歌); 208. Heinetsu (平熱); 209. Undōkai (うんどーかい); 210. Kinmedaru (きんめだる); 211. Kunoichi (くノ一)
17	March 10, 2023	978-4-09-851762-6
212. Ān (あーん); 213. Nedan ate (値段当て); 214. Himitsu no Hon (ひみつの本); 215. Atatakai (あたたかい); 216. Papa Mama (パパママ); 217. Kioku (きおく); 218. Onegai (おねがい); 219. Wan Wan (ワンワン); 220. Seki (せき); 221. Bikkuri (びっくり); 222. Kuizu (クイズ); 223. Senaka (せなか); 224. Himitsu Kichi (ひみつきち); 225. Kehai (気配)
18	March 10, 2023	978-4-09-851765-7
226. Shīru (シール); 227. Make (まけ); 228. Botan (ボタン); 229. Yobikata (呼び方); 230. Jikan (じかん); 231. Chichioya-zō (父親像); 232. Hen gao (へんがお); 233. Osusume (おすすめ); 234. BBQ; 235. Gogatsubyō (5月病); 236. Akachan (あかちゃん); 237. Suberidai (滑り台); 238. Mei Shīn (名シーン); 239. Ame no hi (雨の日)
19	January 12, 2024	978-4-09-853098-4
240. Hana Uta (はなうた); 241. Zaiaku-kan (罪悪感); 242. Tsunagu (つなぐ); 243. Tegata (手形); 244. Punipuni (ぷにぷに); 245. Mushin (無心); 246. Osoroi (お揃い); 247. Ki (木); 248. Dansu (ダンス); 249. Nakamahazure (仲間はずれ); 250. Neta Furi (寝たふり); 251. Kowai no (こわいの); 252. Neko (ネコ); 253. Kaigui (買い食い)
20	March 12, 2024	978-4-09-853185-1
254. Nebo (ねぼー); 255. Yorimichi (寄り道); 256. Shiawase (しあわせ); 257. Suki (すき); 258. Heddofon (ヘッドフォン); 259. Nan no Hi (何の日); 260. Otoshi Mono (おとしもの); 261. Korokoro (ころころ); 262. Kigurumi (着ぐるみ); 263. Hidarikiki (左利き); 264. Kantan (かんたん); 265. Shinjiru (しんじる); 266. Tsunagi Kata (繋ぎ方); 267. Setsubun (節分)
21	May 10, 2024	978-4-09-853332-9
268. Hāto Gata (ハート型); 269. Kotoba (言葉); 270. Itsuka (いつか); 271. Netafuri (ねたふり); 272. Dorinku bā (ドリンクバー); 273. Shisen (視線); 274. Daruma-san (だるまさん); 275. Tobitsuku (とびつく); 276. Mahō (まほー); 277. Oyasuminasai (おやすみなさい); 278. Ohayō no (おはようの); 279. Imagoro (今頃); 280. Ichiban (いちばん); 281. Irekawatteru (いれかわってる)
22	September 11, 2024	978-4-09-853582-8
282. Onedari (おねだり); 283. Kore ga Koi (これがこい); 284. Kanmuri (かんむり); 285. Tsudzuki (つづき); 286. Semi (セミ); 287. Ato nan Nichi (あとなんにち); 288. Nandomo (何度も); 289. Sōzō Yori mo (想像よりも); 290. Uranai (うらない); 291. Shitto (嫉妬); 292. Hatsukoi (初恋); 293. Pea Rukku (ペアルック); 294. Nerenai (寝れない); 295. Hajimete no Basho (初めての場所); 296. Shōgakusei (小学生); 297. Uchi no Karē (うちのカレー)
23	October 11, 2024	978-4-09-853652-8
298. Kimochi (きもち); 299. Hanabi (花火); 300. Kokuhaku (告白); 301. Zutto (ずっと); 302. Chī Mitai (ちーみたい); 303. Hyakkuri (ひゃっくり); 304. Tsugi au Toki Koso (次会う時こそ); 305. Attō ma (あっという間); 306. Fuyu Sanpo (冬さんぽ); 307. Yuki Asobi (ゆきあそび); 308. Kutsu Himo (靴紐); 309. Keisan (計算); 310. Yancha (やんちゃ); 311. Otehon (お手本); 312. Chī no Heya (ちーのへや); 313. Deai (出会い); 314. Donna Ko (どんな子); 315. Dakko (抱っこ); 316. Messēji (メッセージ); 317. Arubamu (アルバム); 318. Itte Kimasu (行ってきます)

== Karakai Jōzu (?) no Nishikata-san ==
A fourth spin-off by Inaba, titled Karakai Jōzu (?) no Nishikata-san (からかい上手(？)の西片さん; lit. "Teasing Master (?) Nishikata-san"), centered around Chi during her middle school years, was serialized for ten chapters in Monthly Shōnen Sunday from November 10, 2023, to August 9, 2024; the collected volume released in October 2024.

No.	Release date	ISBN
1	October 11, 2024	978-4-09-853632-0
1. Hajimari (はじまり); 2. Kioku (記憶); 3. Aiaigasa (相合い傘); 4. Hengao (変顔); 5. Sanpo (散歩); 6. Tesuto (テスト); 7. Shisen (視線); 8. Yorimichi (寄り道); 9. Natsumatsuri (夏祭り); 10. No Hi, Ima, Kore Kara (あの日、今、これから)
