= Our Wonderful Days =

Japanese manga series

- First tankōbon volume cover

徒然日和 (Tsurezurebiyori)
- Genre: Slice of Life; Yuri
- Manga
- Written by: Kei Hamuro
- Published by: Ichijinsha
- English publisher: NA: Seven Seas Entertainment
- Magazine: Comic Yuri Hime
- Original run: October 18, 2017 – September 18, 2019
- Volumes: 3

Our Wonderful Days (Japanese: 徒然日和, Hepburn: Tsurezurebiyori) is a Japanese yuri manga series written and illustrated by Kei Hamuro. It was serialized in Ichijinsha's Comic Yuri Hime from October 2017 to September 2019, and is licensed for an English-language release by Seven Seas Entertainment.

== Synopsis ==
Koharu and Mafuyu, childhood friends, reconnect after Mafuyu's move to Tokyo. As they explore their hometown, Koharu develops a crush on her best friend.

== Publication ==
Written and illustrated by Kei Hamuro, Our Wonderful Days was serialization in Ichijinsha's Comic Yuri Hime from October 18, 2017, to September 18, 2019. The series was collected into 3 tankōbon volumes.

The series is licensed for an English release in North America by Seven Seas Entertainment.

No.	Original release date	Original ISBN	English release date	English ISBN
1	April 18, 2018	9784758078054	December 12, 2019	978-1-64275-338-7
2	February 18, 2019	9784758079044	February 11, 2020	978-1-64505-210-4
3	October 18, 2019	9784758079884	July 21, 2020	978-1-64505-511-2

== Reception ==
Erica Friedman of Yuricon gave the first volume an 8 out of 10, commenting that "there is no story here, it is a tale of lives being lived. The pace is slow, the drama is minimal, the lives are full of small joys, like visiting a convenience store or sharing snacks after school." Nicki Bauman shared similar thoughts towards the series, noting that it was a "soothing and simple manga" however she felt "if you want a nice pleasant read to relax to, pick up a copy of Our Wonderful Days. If you would rather skip it, you will not miss much."
