= Odoriba ni Skirt ga Naru =

Japanese manga series

- First tankōbon volume cover

踊り場にスカートが鳴る (Odoriba ni Sukāto ga Naru)
- Genre: Yuri
- Manga
- Written by: Yū Utatane
- Published by: Ichijinsha
- Imprint: Yuri Hime Comics
- Magazine: Comic Yuri Hime
- Original run: August 19, 2020 – August 18, 2025
- Volumes: 6

Odoriba ni Skirt ga Naru (踊り場にスカートが鳴る, Odoriba ni Sukāto ga Naru; lit. 'The Skirt Sings on the Dance Floor') is a Japanese manga series written and illustrated by Yū Utatane. It was serialized in Ichijinsha's yuri manga magazine Comic Yuri Hime from August 2020 to August 2025.

== Publication ==
Written and illustrated by Yū Utatane, Odoriba ni Skirt ga Naru was serialized in Ichijinsha's yuri manga magazine Comic Yuri Hime on August 19, 2020, to August 18, 2025. Its chapters were compiled into six tankōbon volumes released from June 17, 2021, to October 18, 2025.

No.	Release date	ISBN
1	June 17, 2021	978-4-7580-2262-0
2	April 18, 2022	978-4-7580-2394-8
3	April 18, 2023	978-4-7580-2530-0
4	February 17, 2024	978-4-7580-2659-8
5	December 17, 2024	978-4-7580-2818-9
6	October 18, 2025	978-4-7580-2979-7

== Reception ==
The series was nominated twice for the eighth and the ninth Next Manga Awards in the print category.
