= Hello, Melancholic! =

Japanese yuri manga

- Cover of first English volume

ハロー、メランコリック！ (Harō, Merankorikku!)
- Genre: Coming-of-age; Romance; Yuri
- Manga
- Written by: Yayoi Ohsawa
- Published by: Ichijinsha
- English publisher: NA: Seven Seas Entertainment
- Magazine: Comic Yuri Hime
- Original run: June 18, 2019 – November 18, 2020
- Volumes: 3

Hello, Melancholic! (ハロー、メランコリック！, Harō, Merankorikku!) is a Japanese yuri manga written and illustrated by Yayoi Ohsawa. It was serialized in Ichijinsha's Comic Yuri Hime from June 2019 to November 2020 and licensed for an English-language release by Seven Seas Entertainment in 2021. The series follows Minato Asano, a talented trombone player, and Hibiki, an upperclassman who wants her to join the band she is forming at school.

== Plot ==
Minato Asano, a tall but stooping first-year high school student, makes every effort to blend in with her peers while carrying a trombone, despite the lack of music groups at school. However, After catching the attention of an upper-classman named Hibiki, she is persuaded to join the band Hibiki is forming.

== Media ==
=== Manga ===
Written and illustrated by Yayoi Ohsawa, Hello, Melancholic! was serialized in Ichijinsha's Comic Yuri Hime from June 18, 2019, to November 18, 2020. The series was collected in three tankōbon volumes released between October 2019 to March 2021.

It is licensed for an English release in North America by Seven Seas Entertainment.

No.	Original release date	Original ISBN	English release date	English ISBN
1	October 18, 2019	978-4-75-807987-7	February 1, 2022	978-1-64827-885-3
2	June 18, 2020	978-4-75-802126-5	July 12, 2022	978-1-63858-340-0
3	March 17, 2021	978-4-75-802228-6	December 20, 2022	978-1-63858-775-0

=== Other ===
On July 18, 2019, Ichijinsha released a Power Push reading of the first chapter, featuring Hanayuki Matsumoto as Minato Asano, Natsumi Takamori as Kyosei Sugawa, Masumi Tazawa as Chika Inagaki and Aya Suzaki as Sakiko Arita.

== Reception ==
The series has received positive reviews. Nicholas Dupree for Anime News Network gave the first volume an overall B rating, noting that while the series follows an "extremely familiar story" of an anxious teenager struggling to make friends who meets a quirky girl, "that doesn't mean it can't be a good one if told well, and through this first volume, this series is a firmly charming riff on the formula."

Erica Friedman of Yuricon rated the first volume 8 out of 10 rating, describing "Hello, Melancholic! as a "story of a life redeemed from the darkness." She praised the depiction of Minato's musical experiences and noted Mo Harrison's lettering in the English volume for effectively capturing the music on the page.

Hello, Melancholic! was included on the School Library Journal's recommendation list of nine LGBTQIA+ manga for teens.
