= Destroy It All And Love Me In Hell =

Japanese manga series

- First tankōbon volume cover

ぜんぶ壊して地獄で愛して (Zenbu Kowashite Jigoku de Aishite)
- Genre: Drama; Yuri
- Manga
- Written by: Tamotsu Kuwabara
- Published by: Ichijinsha
- Imprint: Yuri Hime Comics
- Magazine: Comic Yuri Hime
- Original run: February 17, 2023 – present
- Volumes: 6

Destroy It All And Love Me In Hell (Japanese: ぜんぶ壊して地獄で愛して, Hepburn: Zenbu Kowashite Jigoku de Aishite) is a Japanese manga series written and illustrated by Tamotsu Kuwabara. It began serialization in Ichijinsha's yuri manga magazine Comic Yuri Hime in February 2023.

== Plot ==
The story follows Kurumi Yoshizawa, the student council president seeming inviting and friendly. Her homeroom teacher asks her to visit a truant classmate, Naoi, who sees through Kurumi's façade and starts to coerce her, leading them into a toxic romantic relationship.

== Development ==
In an interview, Tamotsu Kuwabara stated that Destroy It All And Love Me In Hell was inspired by their previous work What Was I Just Thinking?. They created the series with the themes of impulse and liberation, integrating their favorite yuri tropes: "a girl who's a handful but you can't leave her alone" and "bickering couples".

== Publication ==
Written and illustrated by Tamotsu Kuwabara, Destroy It All And Love Me In Hell began serialization in Ichijinsha's Comic Yuri Hime magazine on February 17, 2023. Its chapters have been collected into six tankōbon volumes as of June 2026.

No.	Release date	ISBN
1	August 18, 2023	978-4-7580-2590-4
2	March 18, 2024	978-4-7580-2693-2
3	October 18, 2024	978-4-7580-2777-9
4	May 16, 2025	978-4-7580-2897-4
5	November 18, 2025	978-4-7580-2989-6
6	June 18, 2026	978-4-7580-9933-2

== Reception ==
The series was nominated for the eleventh Next Manga Awards in 2025 in the print category; it has also been nominated for the same award in 2026. According to the bookstore Comic Zin, the fifth tankōbon volume ranked tenth in sales for the period of November 17–23, 2025.
