= If I Could Reach You =

If I Could Reach You may refer to:

- If I Could Reach You (song), a 1972 song by The 5th Dimension
- If I Could Reach You (manga), a Japanese yuri manga by tMnR
