= Kitanai Kimi ga Ichiban Kawaii =

Japanese manga series

- First tankōbon volume cover

きたない君がいちばんかわいい
- Genre: Drama; Suspense; Yuri
- Manga
- Written by: Manio
- Published by: Ichijinsha
- Imprint: Yuri Hime Comics
- Magazine: Comic Yuri Hime
- Original run: June 18, 2019 – February 18, 2022
- Volumes: 5

Kitanai Kimi ga Ichiban Kawaii (きたない君がいちばんかわいい; lit. "Filthy you is the cutest"), also presented with the subtitle "I Love Your Cruddy...", is a Japanese manga series written and illustrated by Manio. It was serialized in Ichijinsha's yuri manga magazine Comic Yuri Hime from June 2019 to February 2022.

== Synopsis ==
Airi Sezaki and Hinako (Hina) Hanamura, two high school girls who are of different social groups but were friends during middle school, pretend not to know each other during class. However, after school, they meet in the science lab to experiment with fetishes. Airi initiates most of this, while Hina plays along for the sake of keeping their friendship. Eventually, they're discovered by Yoshimi Matsushita, who takes shocking photographs of them and uses it to blackmail the two. It comes off as bullying to those not involved, and Airi denies any involvement with it or Hina. The two stop meeting up after class while Hina worries about the state of their friendship. Later on, one of the girls confronts Airi about bullying Hina, and the confrontation devolves into screaming. Airi stops showing up to school afterwards, which only makes Hina worry more.

Hina tries contacting her online, but receives no response, and thus shows up to her house to see her disheveled. Airi tries to get her to leave, but eventually gives in, and Hina begins meeting up with her everyday after school with the roles flipped between Airi holding control over Hina to vice versa. One of the girls that Airi was friends and talked to regularly before she stopped coming to school reaches out due to a preconception that Airi must be the main character, and that she must become an important side character. She meets up with Airi without Hina knowing, until the two of them meet up in Airi's room on the same day. Hina reveals that the other girl had placed a spy camera in Airi's room without disclosing that she did the same thing, and chases her off. She reassures Airi, telling her that it's not safe to trust anybody but her. This motivates Airi to run away from home, and Hina gladly obliges.

The two girls catch a train to a town nearby, with all the money saved up from birthdays and holidays keeping them afloat. They skip between hotels and restaurants, but the money soon starts to run thin. A search has been started by the police for them, so they have to keep moving towns. Airi worries about what would happen if the police found them, scared of the judgement of others. In order to prevent the two of them going back, Hina applies for jobs nearby, but sees little success until she hears back from a job at a local bookstore. Airi secretly despises this, fearful of being abandoned. She feels like their relationship is one-sided, and that she's reliant on Hina while Hina doesn't actually need her. Stuck feeling helpless, she looks into suicide methods, and this thought comes to a climax when she takes Hina to the beach and persuades her to come into the cold waters with her in order to die of hypothermia. They submerge themselves before Airi breaks down, exclaiming how she doesn't want to die, and the two of them return to their hotel.

The day after, Airi tells Hina not to go back to her job, saying that she'd die without her. Hina obliges, and secretly texts her mom asking for some money under the promise that she'd be back soon. Airi looks through her phone when she goes to take a bath, and is enraged by this. The two argue for some time, but eventually settle. Later that night, they're talking when Airi asks Hina how she thinks something becomes eternal. Hina doesn't know how to respond, so Airi continues, saying that she thinks something becomes eternal when it ends. Airi then asks if she would make them eternal. Hina places her hands on Airi's neck and begins strangling her. She internally reflects on how she despised how Airi only interacted with her when convenient; how she wanted Airi all to herself; how Airi was all she could think about; but now that she has her all to herself, wishes the Airi she had was the old, lively Airi back then. Hina can't find it within herself to stop strangling her, and by the time she does release her grasp she's already died. She begs Airi not to leave her, and carries her corpse on her back outside into the snow. She walks towards a bench, but trips, dropping Airi's dead body into the snow. Hina reaches out to hold her hand and closes her eyes as she succumbs to hypothermia; the final panel of the manga is them lying together under a layer of snow.

== Publication ==
Written and illustrated by Manio, Kitanai Kimi ga Ichiban Kawaii was serialized in Ichijinsha's yuri manga magazine Comic Yuri Hime from June 18, 2019, to February 18, 2022. The series' chapters were collected in five tankōbon volumes from November 18, 2019, to April 18, 2022.

No.	Release date	ISBN
1	November 18, 2019	978-4-7580-7991-4
2	June 18, 2020	978-4-7580-2125-8
3	December 18, 2020	978-4-7580-2195-1
4	July 16, 2021	978-4-7580-2273-6
5	April 18, 2022	978-4-7580-2395-5; 978-4-7580-2396-2 (SE)

== Reception ==
The series ranked sixth in AnimeJapan's "Most Wanted Anime Adaptation" Poll in 2024.
