= Exchange diary =

Notebook shared between friends

An exchange diary (交換日記, kōkan nikki) is a notebook shared between friends, who take it in turns to write in their thoughts or other comments. Exchange diaries were especially popular in Japan in the 1990s in elementary and junior high schools, particularly among girls.

== Particulars ==
The diary is made out of a special notebook. In Japan, this notebook would be decorated with small annotated and decorated photographs called “Purikura.” The diary cover and pages, if plain, are often decorated with drawings as well as photographs. The names of the participants or the name of the exchange diary might be written in pen across the front or back covers. More formal exchange diaries would be plain with the names of the participants written on the cover.

Entries take the form of a normal diary. There are, however, subtle differences. While an entry might talk about a person's day or activities since the people last met, the entry will be written in a different way. The writers, rather than being totally honest with themselves, will instead be writing what he or she wants the reader to see.

The format of an exchange diary can also be good for therapy, because it gives someone a platform to write about her problems and experiences. Sometimes, a lack of honesty can be an issue. However, the same is true in face-to-face therapy settings. As long as the patient remains aware of not being totally honest, progress towards well-being is possible. While the privacy of such medical diaries are often protected by law, other diaries, including school exchange diaries, usually are not.

== See also ==
- Pen pal

Manga and anime series that involve exchange diaries:

- Azuki-chan
- Saikano
- Revolutionary Girl Utena
- Wandering Son
- Marmalade Boy
- Mizuiro Jidai
- I Can't Say No to the Lonely Girl
