= Citrus (manga) =

Japanese manga series by Saburouta

- First tankōbon volume cover of Citrus featuring Mei (left) and Yuzu Aihara (right)
- Genre: Romance, yuri
- Manga
- Written by: Saburouta
- Published by: Ichijinsha
- English publisher: NA: Seven Seas Entertainment
- Imprint: Yuri Hime Comics
- Magazine: Comic Yuri Hime
- Original run: November 17, 2012 – August 18, 2018
- Volumes: 10
- Anime television series
- Directed by: Takeo Takahashi; Naoyuki Tatsuwa (Note: Credited as Chief Director (チーフ演出, Chīfu Enshutsu).)
- Produced by: Hiroshi Kawamura; Takema Okamura; Noritomo Isogai; Hirotaka Kaneko; Shinji Ōmori; Kōji Akio; Fumihiro Ozawa; Hirohiko Kanbe; Kanako Umezawa
- Written by: Naoki Hayashi
- Music by: Ryō Takahashi
- Studio: Passione
- Licensed by: Crunchyroll; SA/SEA: Medialink
- Original network: AT-X
- Original run: January 6, 2018 – March 24, 2018
- Episodes: 12
- Manga

Citrus Plus
- Written by: Saburouta
- Published by: Ichijinsha
- English publisher: NA: Seven Seas Entertainment
- Imprint: Yuri Hime Comics
- Magazine: Comic Yuri Hime
- Original run: December 18, 2018 – present
- Volumes: 7

Citrus (stylized as citrus) is a Japanese yuri manga series written and illustrated by Saburouta. It was serialized in Ichijinsha's Comic Yuri Hime from November 2012 to August 2018. In North America, it is licensed in English by Seven Seas Entertainment. A 12-episode anime television series adaptation by Passione aired from January to March 2018. A sequel manga titled Citrus Plus began serialization in December 2018.

== Plot ==
Yuzu Aihara, a fashionable, spontaneous and fun-loving city girl, transfers to a new neighborhood and high school after her mother's remarriage to another man. More preoccupied with boys and shopping than studying, Yuzu struggles to fit in at Aihara Academy, a conservative all-girls school, and frequently clashes with the student council, specifically Mei Aihara, the hard-working, beautiful but cold student council president. As it turns out, Mei happens to be Yuzu's new stepsister and Yuzu finds herself having to share a bedroom with a girl she absolutely cannot stand. The series follows the evolution of the relationship between the two girls, with the animosity slowly lessening as the two begin to learn more about each other and confusion growing as Yuzu discovers that she is starting to develop romantic feelings for her new stepsister.

== Characters ==
=== Main characters ===
Yuzu Aihara (藍原 柚子, Aihara Yuzu)
Voiced by: Ayana Taketatsu (Japanese); Megan Shipman (English)
Yuzu is a self-proclaimed gyaru and Mei Aihara's older stepsister. Her father died when she was very young. She dyes her hair blonde, and has green eyes. She is a daring, outspoken, and often shameless only child who transfers to Aihara Academy, an all-girls school, after her mother gets remarried. She enjoys dressing up, wearing makeup and customizing her school uniform in ways that clash with her school's code of conduct, often leading to altercations with the student council. Although her former friends believed her to be quite experienced in dating and relationships, she confesses she has never had a boyfriend. Her former surname was Okonogi (小此木).

Mei Aihara (藍原 芽衣, Aihara Mei)
Voiced by: Minami Tsuda (Japanese); Amber Lee Connors (English)
Mei is the beautiful and serious Student Council President, honor student, school chairman's granddaughter, and Yuzu's younger stepsister. She is stern, cold and composed, but has a short temper. Although greatly respected by the student body, she may on occasion act or speak cruelly. This trait, as well as the fact that Mei often makes sexual advances toward her simply to manipulate her, greatly frustrates Yuzu.

=== Aihara Academy ===
Harumi Taniguchi (谷口 はるみ, Taniguchi Harumi)
Voiced by: Yukiyo Fujii (Japanese); Margaret McDonald (English)
Often referred to as "Harumin" (はるみん), she befriends Yuzu on her first day of school, calling herself a "gyaru in disguise" and showing Yuzu the ropes at her new school. Although she has adapted to fit in at the school, Harumi was also a transfer and is quite different from the conservative girls around her, taking no interest in fawning over Mei. She often breaks the school rules by taking her phone to school and going out after school hours. She is perky, kind, perceptive, humorous, easy-going and an overall good friend towards Yuzu, often lending her comfort and aide in the wake of the ups and downs of Yuzu's life. She often packs many items within her cleavage, and she has an older sister whom she is slightly fearful of.

Himeko Momokino (桃木野 姫子, Momokino Himeko)
Voiced by: Yurika Kubo (Japanese); Bryn Apprill (English)
Himeko is the Student Council vice-president and Mei's childhood friend and current right hand. She is from a very wealthy family, having a chauffeur and at least one butler. On weekends she can be seen wearing lolita fashion. She is stern, forward and jealous, and has quite a volatile personality. She is in love with Mei and is very possessive of her, becoming jealous when Yuzu enters her life. She has a small dog named Pucchi.

Kayo Maruta (丸田 加代, Maruta Kayo)
Voiced by: Ikumi Hayama (Japanese); Natalie Hoover (English)
A member of the Student Council, a shy second-year student who is very close to Harumi's sister Mitsuko, being the original vice-president before Mitsuko left the school. She is the only one bold enough to talk to Mitsuko casually, even referring to her as "Micchan" (みっちゃん). She was shown to constantly mock Mitsuko for being immature and scaring Harumi away, but ultimately has a crush on Mitsuko.

Chairman (理事長, Rijichō)
Voiced by: Kinryū Arimoto^{Ep. 2 credits} (Japanese); Charlie Campbell (English)
Shou's father and Mei's grandfather, who disliked Yuzu at first due to her breaking his school's rules and briefly expelled her after walking in on Mei sexually assaulting Yuzu, assuming Yuzu was the one attacking. He later pardons her after she saves his life by calling him an ambulance after she finds him collapsed from a heart attack. Mei temporarily had taken over duties as Chairman until he returns from the hospital.

Nene Nomura (野村 寧音, Nomura Nene)
Nene is an energetic first year who looks to Yuzu as a role model; an inspiration to become braver and speaking up. It is later revealed that she is also an intense yuri shipper, specifically of Yuzu and Harumi. She is grateful of Yuzu and the others for having accepted her, even after all of the trouble she unintentionally caused them.

Suzuran Shiraho (白帆 鈴蘭, Shiraho Suzuran)
Suzuran is an extremely observant and unflappable third-year of Aihara Academy. She has an immense infatuation for Mei, for she is the only person that she cannot read. Consequently, she spends all of her free time observing her, thus why she is in need of summer supplementary lessons. Suzuran comes from a rich family who refrain from expressing emotions in order to not be taken advantage of by others. She also has an older stepbrother.

Sayaka Hikami (氷上 さやか, Hikami Sayaka)
Sayaka is a strict yet calm first-year student and member of the student council. She dislikes the new rules at the academy, believing that people take advantage of them and questions Mei's leadership. She is close friends with fellow first-year Miyabi Sakuraba. She struggles to believe that two girls can fall in love with each other.

Miyabi Sakuraba (桜庭 雅, Sakuraba Miyabi)
Miyabi is a kind first-year student council member who compassionately listens to her friend Sayaka, who she had known from middle school. She is a warm and friendly person open to trying new things such as falling in love. She does not mind the new school rules and does not think love between two girls is impossible, contrary to her friend Sayaka.

=== Others ===
Kana (カナ)
Voiced by: Haruka Yamazaki^{Ep. 1 credits} (Japanese); Michelle Rojas (English)
Kana is Yuzu's friends since middle school. She lost contact with Yuzu when Yuzu transferred schools, but she met her again while working part-time back in her old city.

Manami (まなみ)
Voiced by: Yuka Ōtsubo ^{Ep. 1 credits} (Japanese); Brittany Lauda (English)
Manami is Yuzu's friends since middle school. She lost contact with Yuzu when Yuzu transferred schools, but she met her again while working part-time back in her old city.

Shou Aihara (藍原 翔, Aihara Shō)
Voiced by: Tomoaki Maeno (Japanese); David Wald (English)
He is Mei's divorced father and Yuzu's stepfather.

Ume Aihara (藍原 梅, Aihara Ume)
Voiced by: Kana Ueda (Japanese); Terri Doty (English)
She is Yuzu's widowed mother and Mei's stepmother. Her maiden name is Okonogi.

Amamiya (雨宮)
Voiced by: Shō Nogami (Japanese); Dave Trosko (English)
A homeroom teacher at Aihara Academy. He was Mei's fiancé until he gets fired from the school after Yuzu revealed his behavior in front of the entire school.

Matsuri Mizusawa (水沢 まつり, Mizusawa Matsuri)
Voiced by: Sayaka Horino (PV, drama CD), Shiori Izawa (anime) (Japanese); Kristi Rothrock (English)
Matsuri is the older sister of Inori, whose parents are always working and do not really pay attention to them. She is Yuzu's childhood friend who lived close to her before she moved to the Aihara residence, and a second-year in middle school. Matsuri is precocious and smart for her age, and does not mind her words. She can be mischievous at times and she enjoys teasing people, especially Yuzu and Harumi. Like Mei, she tends to be manipulative. She sells masturbation videos she finds on the Internet to old men through a phone app, pretending they are hers, as a means of income. She eventually develops feelings for Harumi, even claiming to be her girlfriend.

Sara Tachibana (タチバナ・サラ, Tachibana Sara)
Voiced by: Hisako Kanemoto (Japanese); Felecia Angelle (English)
Sara is a student from a different school. She falls in love with Mei at first sight, but after finding out about her relationship with Yuzu, she gives up on Mei in order to support their love. Sara is very superstitious and ardently believes in things such as luck and destiny. She is very short, and has a younger twin sister named Nina.

Nina Tachibana (タチバナ・ニナ, Tachibana Nina)
Voiced by: Rei Matsuzaki (Japanese); Megan Emerick (English)
She is Sara's younger twin sister, who happens to be much taller. She is a skeptical and does not believe in fate. She worries very much for her Sara, so she tried to help her and Mei getting together, and tried to prevent Yuzu from getting in their way.

Mitsuko Taniguchi (谷口 みつ子, Taniguchi Mitsuko)
The older sister of Harumi Taniguchi. She is the former Student Council President of Aihara Academy. She was very close to Kayo, who still remains a part of the student council to this very day, when she was still in the academy.

Ichika (イチカ)
A school friend of Nina and Sara. She seems to have been the one to introduce Nina to Momoiro Shimai, and is also the school's Student Council President, being the complete opposite of Mei at that.

Udagawa (宇田川)
The manager of the café where Yuzu worked part-time for some time in order to buy her a ring. Despite not knowing who is Yuzu's lover, he supports their relationship. It is revealed that he was Mei's fiancé, for a short time.

Inori Mizusawa (水沢 いのり, Mizusawa Inori)
Inori is Matsuri's younger brother.

== Media ==
=== Manga ===
Written and illustrated by Saburouta, Citrus was serialized in Ichijinsha's bimonthly magazine Comic Yuri Hime from November 17, 2012 to August 18, 2018. Ichijinsha published ten tankōbon volumes from July 18, 2013 to October 31, 2018. To advertise the third volume of the manga, a PV covering the story up to that point was uploaded to Ichijinsha's YouTube channel on November 18, 2014. A drama CD was released with the fourth manga volume on July 18, 2015. The manga is licensed in North America by Seven Seas Entertainment, who published the series from December 16, 2014 to July 23, 2019. It has also been licensed in Germany, Thailand, and Taiwan.

A sequel manga series, Citrus Plus (stylized as citrus+), launched on December 18, 2018. The series is also licensed in North America by Seven Seas Entertainment.

==== Volumes ====
===== Citrus =====
| No. | Original release date | Original ISBN | English release date | English ISBN |
|---|---|---|---|---|
| 1 | July 18, 2013; July 18, 2015 (SE) | 978-4-7580-7264-9; 978-4-7580-7452-0 (SE) | December 16, 2014 | 978-1-626921-40-5 |
1. "Love Affair?"; 2. "One's First Love"; 3. "Love My Sister×××"; 4. "Sisterly Love?"; Extra: Citrus+ 1: "I Couldn't Hide It"; "Harumin and Megane-senpai" (はるみんとメガネ先輩, Harumin to Megane-senpai); "Mei-chan & Mr. Bear" (芽衣とクマさん, Mei to Kuma-san)
| 2 | March 18, 2014; July 18, 2015 (SE) | 978-4-7580-7297-7; 978-4-7580-7453-7 (SE) | April 7, 2015 | 978-1-626921-41-2 |
5. "Love Me Do!"; 6. "Under Lover"; 7. "No Love"; 8. "Out of Love"; Extra: Citrus+ 2: "There's a Bear Here, Too"; "It Was an Accident!"; "Aren't They the Same?"
| 3 | November 18, 2014; July 18, 2015 (SE) | 978-4-7580-7372-1; 978-4-7580-7454-4 (SE) | August 18, 2015 | 978-4-758073-72-1 |
9. "Love or Lie!"; 10. "Love of War"; 11. "Love is Blind"; 12. "Love is"; Extra: Citrus+ 3: "The Older Sister Has a Secret"; "The Older Sister is Toyed With"; "The Older Sister is..."; "Matsuri and Harumin"
| 4 | July 18, 2015 | 978-4-7580-7449-0; 978-4-7580-7449-0 (SE) | December 29, 2015 | 978-1-626922-17-4 |
13. "Winter of Love"; 14. "The Course of Love"; 15. "Love You Only"; 16. "My Love Goes On And On"; Extra: Citrus+ 4: "Sara and Mei"
| 5 | May 18, 2016 | 978-4-7580-7540-4; 978-4-7580-7545-9 (SE) | September 6, 2016 | 978-1-626922-67-9 |
17. "To be in Love"; 18. "Love Birds!?"; 19. "Love and Friendship"; 20. "Love Yourself"; Extra: Citrus+ 5: "Love Triangle?!"; "The Older Sister Plays a Poor Endgame" (お姉ちゃんはツメが甘い, Onee-chan wa Tsume ga Amai); "The Younger Sister's Jealousy" (妹はヤキモチやき, Imōto wa Yakimochi Yaki); "Mitsuko and Her Underclassman, Megane" (みつ子とメガネ後輩, Mitsuko to Megane-senpai)
| 6 | December 17, 2016 | 978-4-7580-7624-1; 978-4-7580-7625-8 (SE) | August 22, 2017 | 978-1-626925-12-0 |
21. "Dear Lover"; 22. "Love Notes"; 23. "The Way I Love"; 24. "Not Give Up Love"; Extra: Citrus+ 6: "Omen"; "Aihara Mei and Spicy Cooking"
| 7 | June 16, 2017 | 978-4-7580-7673-9; 978-4-7580-7680-7 (SE) | February 13, 2018 | 978-1-626926-85-1 |
25. "Love One Another"; 26. "In Fear of Love"; 27. "The One You Love"; 28. "Love EXE."; Extra: Citrus+ 7: "Study Group at Shiraho-san's House"
| 8 | October 18, 2017 | 978-4-7580-7741-5; 978-4-7580-7743-9 (SE) | August 28, 2018 | 978-1-626928-94-7 |
29. "Summer of Love"; 30. "Secret Love"; 31. "Live to Love"; 32. "Lovey Dovey"; Extra: Citrus+ 8: "Papa & Mama"
| 9 | March 23, 2018 | 978-4-7580-7793-4; 978-4-7580-7794-1 (SE) | March 19, 2019 | 978-1-642750-11-9 |
33. "Form of love" 34. "My love and your love" 35. "Love actually" 36. "Whereabouts of love"; Extra: Citrus+ 9
| 10 | October 31, 2018 | 978-4-7580-7873-3 | July 23, 2019 | 978-1-642751-03-1 |
37. "Love is over...?" 38. "In love because" 39. "With love" 40. "Love your life" 41. "Love forever"; Extra: Citrus+ 10

===== Citrus Plus =====
| No. | Original release date | Original ISBN | English release date | English ISBN |
|---|---|---|---|---|
| 1 | November 18, 2019 | 978-4-7580-7976-1; 978-4-7580-7995-2 (SE) | November 18, 2019 (digital); February 11, 2020 (print) | 978-1-642756-88-3 |
1. "May 27th" 2. "May 30th ①"; 3. May 30th ②"; 4. "June 2nd" 5. "June 13th" 6. "June 15th" 7. "June 16th ①"; 8. "June 16th ②"
| 2 | July 31, 2020 | 978-4-7580-2104-3; 978-4-7580-2105-0 (SE) | November 24, 2020 | 978-1-645057-33-8 |
9. "June 20th ①"; 10. "June 20th ②"; 11. "June 20th ③"; 12. "June 21st ①"; 13. "June 21st ②"; 14. "June 24th through 28th" 15. "June 29th"
| 3 | March 31, 2021 | 978-4-7580-2218-7; 978-4-7580-2219-4 (SE) | November 4, 2021 (digital); November 30, 2021 (print) | 978-1-64-827925-6 |
16. "June 30th" 17. "July 1st ①"; 18. "July 1st ②"; 19. "July 4th" 20. "July 9th" 21. "July 14th" 22. "July 19th" 23. "July 28th" 24. "July 29th"
| 4 | January 18, 2022 | 978-4-7580-2337-5; 978-4-7580-2338-2 (SE) | November 10, 2022 (digital); December 13, 2022 (print) | 978-1-63858-526-8 |
25. "August 1st" 26. "August 3rd" 27. "August 7th" 28. "August 8th" 29. "August 14th" 30. "August 21st"
| 5 | January 13, 2023 | 978-4-7580-24891; 978-4-7580-2490-7 (SE) | October 3, 2023 | 979-8-88843-050-7 |
31. "August 25th" 32. "August 27th" 33. "August 31st" 34. "September 6th" 35. "September 7th" 36. "September 8th" 37. "September 10th"
| 6 | June 25, 2024 | 978-4-7580-2722-9; 978-4-7580-2723-6 (SE) | November 19, 2024 | 979-8-89160-627-2 |
38. "September 24th" 39. "September 26th" 40. "September 27th" 41. "September 30th" 42. "September 30th through October 4th" 43. "October 7th"
| 7 | June 29, 2026 | 978-4-7580-9965-3; 978-4-7580-9966-0 (SE) | January 26, 2027 | 979-8-89561-664-2 |
44. "October 5th" 45. "October 27th" 46. "November 4th" 47. "November 5th" 48. "November 9th" 49. "November 10th"

=== Anime ===
An anime television series adaptation, directed by Takeo Takahashi and animated by Passione, aired on AT-X from January 6 to March 24, 2018. Naoki Hayashi oversaw the scripts, while Izuro Ijuuin was in charge of designing the characters. Lantis produced the music, while Infinite was credited with producing the anime. The opening theme is "Azalea" (アザレア, Azarea) by Nano Ripe, while the ending theme is "Dear Teardrop" by Mia Regina. Crunchyroll streamed the series with original Japanese audio and English subtitles, while Funimation premiered an English dub. Following Sony's acquisition of Crunchyroll, the dub was moved to Crunchyroll. The series was released on Blu-ray Disc in North America on January 22, 2019 and in Australia on May 8, 2019.

==== Episodes ====
| No. | Title | Original release date |
|---|---|---|
| 1 | "love affair!?" | January 6, 2018 |
After her mother Ume remarries, Yuzu Aihara begins attending Aihara Academy, quickly getting in trouble with the student council president Mei over her gyaru appearance. After making friends with her classmate Harumi Tanaguchi, Yuzu spots Mei being kissed by one of the teachers, Amamiya. Upon returning home, Yuzu is shocked to discover that because of Ume's remarriage, Mei has become her new stepsister and moved in with them. Later that night, as Yuzu presses Mei about what happened earlier, Yuzu is further taken aback when Mei suddenly kisses her on the lips.
| 2 | "one's first love" | January 13, 2018 |
As Yuzu remains bewildered by Mei's actions towards her, she gets on bad terms with the school's chairman, Mei's grandfather. She and Harumi then overhear Amamiya, Mei's fiancé, speaking with his lover, learning that he is just marrying Mei for her money and status. Despite Mei stating that she already knows and does not care, Yuzu notices her crying in her sleep over her father. The next day, Yuzu takes the stage to publicly announce Amamiya's affair in front of the whole school, using her status as the chairman's granddaughter to support her claims. That night, however, Yuzu discovers that Mei has been taken away to the chairman's place, leaving Ume distraught. Feeling guilty, Yuzu goes to the chairman's house to confront Mei over how she really feels, but gets caught in a compromising position by the chairman, who expels her. Explaining her situation to Harumi, Yuzu comes to the realization that she is in love with Mei.
| 3 | "sisterly love?" | January 20, 2018 |
Deciding to confront the chairman following encouragement from Harumi, Yuzu finds him collapsed on the floor and rushes him to the hospital. Thankful for Yuzu's help, the chairman decides to revoke her expulsion and allows Mei to live how she chooses to, leading her to return to Yuzu's home. Later, as Yuzu becomes conflicted between her feelings for Mei and her role as a sister, she becomes upset when Mei states that the kiss between them was just a means of shutting her up. The next day, as Mei confronts Yuzu about a yuri incest manga amongst her belongings, Yuzu kisses her on the lips, blaming her for the way she is feeling before running off in tears.
| 4 | "love me do!" | January 27, 2018 |
As Yuzu avoids coming home out of fear of having to face Mei, she is approached by Himeko Momokino, the student council vice-president and Mei's childhood friend, about what their relationship is. After telling Yuzu about how Mei's father left her, Himeko lies about Mei being hurt by Yuzu's actions, leading her to feel guilty until she runs into Mei, who calls her by her first name and tells Himeko that they are now sisters. Later that night, Mei apologizes to Yuzu and gives her first mutual kiss. The next day, Himeko, jealous of how close Yuzu is to Mei, forces herself upon Mei and later brags about "crossing the line" with her to Yuzu, who becomes anxious when Mei will not tell her anything about it.
| 5 | "under lover" | February 3, 2018 |
After receiving some amusement park tickets from Harumi, Yuzu asks Mei to accompany her as she goes to meet her father. Along the way, Mei tells Yuzu that nothing happened between her and Himeko, who gets told off by her when she tries to interrupt their date. Yuzu eventually arrives at her father's grave, where Yuzu, noticing Mei's feelings about her own father, feels she should give up on her love and try to become an ideal sister instead. The next day, Mei collapses with a fever just before a student council meeting, so Yuzu urges Himeko to attend the meetings in Mei's place while she looks after her. Afterward, Yuzu encourage Himeko to be more honest with her feelings and make up with Mei. Later that night, Yuzu and Mei are visited by Mei's father, Shou.
| 6 | "out of love" | February 10, 2018 |
Mei seems to be at odds with Shou, who would rather travel the world than inherit the school like Mei had hoped. Having been raised by her father with that in mind, Mei, feeling she has no one else to rely on, attempts to comfort herself physically with Yuzu, but Yuzu slaps her before things can go any further. The next day, after learning that Shou is setting off abroad yet again, Yuzu urges Mei to work hard for her own sake, encouraging her to see her father off before he leaves. Later, as Yuzu and Mei's relationship starts to deepen, a sinister girl decides to pay Yuzu a visit.
| 7 | "love or lie!" | February 17, 2018 |
Feeling downhearted after Mei tells her to end their kissing habits, Yuzu comes across her childhood friend, Matsuri Mizusawa, becoming perturbed when she hears about her dubious methods of earning money. After glancing through Yuzu's phone, Matsuri catches onto her crush on Mei and almost forces herself onto her until Yuzu receives a call from Mei. Noticing Mei across the street, Matsuri forces a kiss upon Yuzu in front of her. The next day, Matsuri shows up at Yuzu's school to invite Yuzu on a date, effectively declaring war against Mei.
| 8 | "war of love" | February 24, 2018 |
Yuzu brings Mei along to her date with Matsuri, who continues to push her interests on Yuzu despite her objections. Managing to separate her from Yuzu, Matsuri issues a warning to Mei, who kisses her as payback for the kiss she stole from Yuzu, unaware that Matsuri had some kids take a photo of them. After Matsuri takes her leave, Yuzu walks home with Mei, inviting her to a family party on Christmas Eve. The next day, as Yuzu prepares to make a cake for the party, Matsuri appears before Mei.
| 9 | "love is" | March 3, 2018 |
Using the picture she had taken as blackmail, Matsuri instructs Mei to satisfy some of her "text friends". Keeping this a secret, Mei claims that she is too busy to go to the party and tells Yuzu to go on a date with Matsuri instead. The next day, Matsuri becomes frustrated with Yuzu speaking so much about Mei, revealing that Mei is meeting with one of her customers as they speak. Stating that Mei was being considerate of Matsuri this whole time, Yuzu goes in search for her, relieved to find she did not go through with anything, while Matsuri decides to delete the photo. Later that night, Mei makes a sexual advance on Yuzu.
| 10 | "winter of love" | March 10, 2018 |
Mei offers to sleep with Yuzu as gratitude for everything she had done for her, but Yuzu finds herself unable to do it, upsetting Mei. Upon missing her train to her school's trip to Kyoto, Yuzu comes across a Kyoto schoolgirl named Sara Tachibana, who had also missed her train back home, and the two ride another train headed to Kyoto. As the two catch up to their respective schools, Sara explains how she fell in love with a girl who helped her when she got lost, offering Yuzu some advice as she laments her worries about Mei. As Yuzu unsuccessfully tries to talk things over with Mei, Sara's twin sister, Nina, discovers that Yuzu is in love with Mei, the same person Sara fell in love with.
| 11 | "love you only" | March 17, 2018 |
Hearing that Yuzu's school is visiting the Yasaka Shrine said to improve romantic relationships, Nina encourages Sara to go there so she can confess to Mei. As Yuzu remains tries to sort out her feelings towards Mei, Sara confesses to Mei herself. As Yuzu feels downhearted by this news, Sara encourages her not to give up on her love, only learning afterwards that Mei is the one she loves. That night, Yuzu sneaks into Mei's room, where she tries to make a move on Mei before she is thrown out. The next day, as Yuzu goes in search for Mei, Nina tries to stop her, revealing that Sara is the one Mei is on a date with.
| 12 | "my love goes on and on" | March 24, 2018 |
Despite Nina's warning, Yuzu decides to respect her promise and pursue Mei with all her heart. Asking Yuzu to meet up with her, Sara encourages Yuzu to go after Mei and make a proper effort to understand her feelings. Thinking long and hard about what happened that Christmas night, Yuzu chases after Mei and finally tells her her true feelings, which are reciprocated by Mei. Afterwards, Yuzu and Mei apologize to Sara and Nina for all the trouble they caused before the two decide to start officially dating each other.

== Reception ==
Citrus appeared on The New York Times best seller list for manga five times in 2015. In a review of the manga's first volume by Rebecca Silverman of Anime News Network, Citrus is described as having emotionally interesting characters with the contrasting personalities of Yuzu and Mei, and their relationship is likened to a "yuri version of the twins' from Arisa." Silverman praises Saburouta's use of reader hindsight, pointing out that Mei's actions can be seen in a different light as the series progresses due to Saburouta giving a slow understanding of her character. However, the non-consensual elements of the manga are described as uncomfortable in contrast with gentler yuri manga that have previously been released in English.

Juliana Failde of CBR also criticized the series, calling it problematic because it has "strange sexual assault" between two people (Mei and Yuzu) in a "horribly toxic relationship" with each other, and called the romance "poorly executed." Failde further stated that the series had an "inappropriate" sibling relationship where "two step-sisters fall for each other after a forced kiss." The founder of Yuricon and writer of Okazu, Erica Friedman, criticized the series as well for trying to present "sexual assault [as] amusing," and called it insensitive to the Me Too movement. Vrai Kaiser of Anime Feminist cited its effectiveness as a melodrama, but found the non-consensual physical contact between Yuzu and Mei to be uncomfortable, adding that the discomfort is heightened by how these specific elements "seem to make it popular above and beyond other yuri series." Nicole MacLean of THEM Anime Reviews has argued that Sara, is pansexual, demisexual, or even bisexual, but that the series never fully explored this.
