= If I Could Reach You (manga) =

Japanese yuri manga

- Cover of the first Japanese volume

たとえとどかぬ糸だとしても (Tatoe Todokanu Ito da to shite mo)
- Genre: Romantic drama, yuri
- Manga
- Written by: tMnR
- Published by: Ichijinsha
- English publisher: NA: Kodansha Comics
- Magazine: Comic Yuri Hime
- Original run: November 18, 2016 – December 2020
- Volumes: 7

If I Could Reach You (Japanese: たとえとどかぬ糸だとしても, Hepburn: Tatoe Todokanu Ito da to shite mo) is a Japanese yuri manga written and illustrated by tMnR. It was serialized in Ichijinsha's Comic Yuri Hime from 2016 to 2020, and is licensed for an English-language release by Kodansha Comics.

== Synopsis ==
While attending her brother's wedding, Uta finally comes to terms with her crush on Kaoru, her now sister-in-law. Uta enters a new stage of her life having to navigate living with her brother and Kaoru while trying to get over her unrequited feelings. However, as cracks in her brother's marriage begin to show, Uta finds Kaoru confiding in her more and making the process even harder.

== Characters ==
Uta – Voice: Sayaka Senbongi

A hard-working high school student who tries to come to terms with her unrequited feelings for Kaoru, a childhood friend and now sister-in-law. She sometimes feels like she is a burden to others because of her mother's verbal abuse.

Kaoru – Voice: Marie Miyake

A childhood friend of Uta and Reiichi. She went on to marry Reiichi and live together with him and his sister.

Reiichi – Voice: Yuya Nakada

Uta's brother. He and Kaoru dated in high school and married one year prior to the story's start.

== Media ==
=== Manga ===
No.	Original release date	Original ISBN	English release date	English ISBN
1	May 18, 2017	978-4758076692	September 17, 2019	9781632368874
2	November 16, 2017	978-4758077538	November 26, 2019	9781632368881
3	July 18, 2018	978-4758078399	January 14, 2020	9781632368898
4	January 18, 2019	978-4758079020	March 24, 2020	9781632369376
5	August 16, 2019	978-4758079730	October 27, 2020	9781646510474
6	March 18, 2020	978-4758021005	December 14, 2021	9781646511556
7	January 18, 2021	978-4758022071	June 21, 2022	9781646512751

=== Power Push ===
On August 21, 2019, Ichijinsha released a Power Push reading of the first chapter, with Sayaka Senbongi playing Uta and Marie Miyake playing Kaoru.

== Reception ==
If I Could Reach You was nominated for the 2017 Next Manga Award in the print manga category.

In Anime News Network's Fall 2019 Manga Guide, Rebecca Silverman gave the first volume 3 out of 5 stars. Silverman praises tMnR for avoiding making the story unrelentingly depressing and melodramatic by showing that Uta's has already accepted her love will go unrequited. Faye Hopper went on to give the first volume 4 out of 5 stars, noting that "it deals with complicated, difficult issues with a sensitivity and grace you rarely see, and does so, surprisingly, while being light and pleasant." Anime UK News gave the first volume 8/10, praising the maturely and respect paid to the depiction of Uta's feelings.

The series has featured on BookWalker's top-selling manga ranking for 2020.
