= Comic Yuri Hime S =

Japanese manga magazine

- Cover of the first issue of Comic Yuri Hime S featuring characters from Honey Crush
- Categories: Shōnen/Seinen manga
- Frequency: Quarterly
- First issue: June 18, 2007
- Final issue: September 18, 2010
- Company: Ichijinsha
- Country: Japan
- Language: Japanese
- Website: Official website

Comic Yuri Hime S (コミック百合姫S, Komikku Yuri Hime S; lit. Comic Lily Princess S) was a quarterly yuri manga magazine published by Ichijinsha. The first issue was published on June 18, 2007. It was the sister magazine of Comic Yuri Hime. The contributors were mostly shōnen and seinen manga artists. The magazine is aimed at male readers, and included moe elements. In 2010 it was merged with Comic Yuri Hime.

== Serialized manga ==
- Cassiopeia Dolce
- Honey Crush
- Flower Flower
- Fu~Fu
- Konohana Kitan
- Konohana Link
- Marriage Black
- Minus Literacy
- Nanami to Misuzu
- Otomeiro StayTune
- Otome Kikan Gretel (discontinued)
- YuruYuri
