= I Can't Say No to the Lonely Girl =

Japanese manga series

- First tankōbon volume cover, featuring Sora (left) and Ayaka (right)

ロンリーガールに逆らえない (Ronrī Gāru ni Sakaraenai)
- Genre: Romantic comedy; Yuri
- Manga
- Written by: Kashikaze
- Published by: Ichijinsha
- English publisher: NA: Kodansha USA
- Magazine: Comic Yuri Hime
- Original run: October 18, 2019 – October 18, 2022
- Volumes: 6
- icon

I Can't Say No to the Lonely Girl (Japanese: ロンリーガールに逆らえない, Hepburn: Ronrī Gāru ni Sakaraenai) is a Japanese manga series written and illustrated by Kashikaze. It was serialized in Ichijinsha's Comic Yuri Hime magazine from October 2019 to October 2022, with its chapters later being collected in six tankōbon volumes. It was licensed for an English-language release by Kodansha USA, which released the series in six volumes from March 2024 to March 2025. The series follows Ayaka Sakurai, a model student, and Sora Honda, a chronically absent student who blackmails her into granting requests.

Kashikaze came up with the story's idea based on a combination of a classic yuri setting and her own element of a secret agreement between two girls. As she developed the story, she focused on the characters' psychological portrayals, trying to imagine their perspectives and depict their emotions using a variety of visual techniques. She initially submitted it as a one-shot story to Comic Yuri Hime, but was instead offered serialization by the magazine's editors.

The series won the 2021 Yuri Manga Awards by Yuri Navi, and has been generally well received by critics. Although the initial premise of the manga has been met with mixed responses, the series' other elements, particularly its characters, plot, and art style, have garnered favorable reactions.

== Plot ==
Ayaka Sakurai is an excellent student who wants to become a teacher. However, she chokes under the pressure of her high school entrance exam and ends up attending her backup choice. Knowing this, her teacher Michiko Egawa promises her a university recommendation letter if she persuades Sora Honda, a student who has been skipping class, to come to school. Aya reluctantly accepts and visits Sora. The next day, Sora overhears Ayaka talking with Egawa about their deal and blackmails Ayaka into granting daily requests. Sora kisses Ayaka, and Ayaka cannot stop thinking about her for the rest of the day. Afterwards, Sora asks to walk home with her. Determined to find out more about Sora, Ayaka agrees and takes her to an arcade, where Sora wins her a stuffed chick. Ayaka apologizes for being the only one who had fun, but Sora replies that watching her be happy is enjoyable too.

Egawa asks Ayaka to make sure Sora passes her classes, so Ayaka begins tutoring her. Over the next few weeks, the two grow closer as Ayaka continues to grant Sora's requests. One day, after getting caught in a storm following an evening study session, the two spend the night at Sora's house, where Sora reveals that she has lived alone for years. The two fall asleep together, and Sora questions Ayaka if she is truly accepting requests only for her recommendation letter. Soon afterwards, Wakana Morinaga, a new student, shows up and quickly becomes friends with Sora, making Ayaka jealous. After Wakana finds out that Sora has had a longtime crush on Ayaka, she resolves to help them become a couple, and is joined by Minami Yuina, Ayaka's friend.

During a school sports day, Sora faints after running a partner race with Ayaka. Feeling guilty for having pushed Sora too hard, Ayaka apologizes for having initially approached her for selfish reasons. She admits that she now truly values being with her and asks to start anew as friends. Sora accepts, but later asks Ayaka if she is truly content remaining just friends. Unsure how to respond, Ayaka watches Sora leave in silence. After Wakana advises Ayaka to be honest, she prepares to confess to Sora, but before she gets a chance, Sora's mom returns from her distant job and tells Sora that they are moving to a new school. After finding out, Ayaka rushes to the airport and pleads with Sora's mom to let her stay. Realizing how close the two girls are, Sora's mom allows her to remain. As they embrace, Ayaka tells Sora that she loves her.

Seeing Ayaka and Sora become a couple, Wakana reveals that she also once had a crush on a girl, Sara Inoue. However, before Wakana had the chance to confess, Sara stopped showing up to their shared piano lessons, and they lost touch. Shortly afterwards, at the school festival, Wakana and Sara meet by chance. As they catch up, Sara mentions that she has a boyfriend, and Wakana leaves, crestfallen. Seeing this, Ayaka, Sora, and their friends set up another meeting between Sara and Wakana. Wakana reveals her feelings, and though Sara cannot reciprocate, they resolve to stay close friends.

As New Year's approaches, Sora gets a part-time job to pay for university fees. Although she is anxious about not being able to spend as much time with Ayaka, Ayaka reassures her, and they spend Christmas together. Meanwhile, Wakana and Yuina, having grown closer while helping Ayaka and Sora, become a couple themselves. During the annual school trip, Ayaka and Sora reveal their relationship to their other friends, Honami Sakaue and Chizuru Koike. Although they are worried about what will happen, Honami and Chizuru are fully supportive.

As Ayaka takes her university entrance exam, she reflects on how meeting Sora has changed her life, and how the support of her friends has helped her gain new confidence. She gets into the university that she wants, as do her friends, and Egawa congratulates her at graduation. A few months later, Ayaka is living with Sora, who is attending a culinary school. As Sora jokingly asks Ayaka to cook for her, Ayaka laughs and replies that she can never refuse her requests.

== Characters ==
Ayaka Sakurai (桜井 彩花, Sakurai Ayaka)
A model student who struggles under the pressure of exams. She is the class representative and is tasked by Egawa with getting Sora to come to school. Wanting to follow her brother's career choice as a teacher, she reluctantly accepts Egawa's offer of a recommendation. Though she is usually calm and composed, Sora flusters her easily.
Sora Honda (本田 空, Honda Sora)
A truant who lives alone after her parents divorced and her mom started working away from home. She has had a crush on Ayaka since middle school, but has never had the opportunity to act on it. She enjoys provoking reactions out of Ayaka.
Wakana Morinaga (守永 和奏, Morinaga Wakana)
A transfer student from Osaka. She is an outgoing gyaru who enjoys sports. Having regretted the decision not to act on her feelings for another girl in the past, she works with Minami to get Ayaka and Sora together.
Minami Yuina (南 結菜, Yuina Minami)
A student who enjoys fashion and the only one of Ayaka's friends to not be in a club. Together with Wakana, she does her best to support Ayaka and Sora's relationship.
Honami Sakaue (坂上 穂波, Sakaue Honami)
A student who is a part of the track and field club. She is extroverted and one of the first to greet Sora when Ayaka introduces her. She is close friends with Chizuru.
Chizuru Koike (小池 千鶴, Koike Chizuru)
A student who is part of the volleyball club. She is close friends with Honami.
Michiko Egawa (江川 美知子, Egawa Michiko)
Ayaka's homeroom teacher. She frequently surprises Ayaka by greeting her from unusual places to ask how her efforts to bring Sora to school are going. Although she initially tries bribing Ayaka with a recommendation letter, she respects Ayaka's decision to take the entrance exam instead.
Sara Inoue (井上 咲良, Inoue Sara)
Wakana's childhood friend who she took piano lessons with. Following her mother's hospitalization, they are abruptly separated. After reuniting, they become close friends again.

== Production ==
Kashikaze first became interested in stories involving interactions between girls after watching Love Live, and named Bloom into You as a work that greatly impacted her decision to begin drawing yuri manga. She decided to pursue a career as a manga artist after quitting a job that she disliked, but was initially unsure of what type of story to create. After finding an online article that advised a classic approach to the yuri genre, she chose to create a work in a school setting. From there, she added her own element of there being a secret agreement between the two protagonists. She felt that the nature of the premise would allow her to show her strengths, such as portraying emotions.

According to Kashikaze, after deciding on the work's premise, she created a draft within a month then submitted it to Comic Yuri Hime as a one-shot story. After drawing an additional chapter, she was offered serialization. Kashikaze recalled that although her art style was initially considered rough, the story's content was appealing enough for it to be accepted. In the early drafts of the story, Sora's personality was much more forward, an element that was toned down in the final publication.

Kashikaze created Sora's character first, describing her as a character she created instinctively from her own preferences and personality. She then created Ayaka as someone who would pair well with Sora. Finally, she created other characters such as Wakana to complement the main pair and help move the story forward. For the character designs, Kashikaze often referenced fashion magazines that targeted student readership.

As Kashikaze developed the story, she focused on the characters' psychological portrayal, using various drawing techniques to express their emotions and inner conflicts. She put particular effort into showing their feelings by drawing hand gestures, such as using splayed fingers to indicate a character being in emotional turmoil. To effectively express the characters' emotions, she tried to put herself in their perspectives, which she described as an especially difficult part of creating the story. For romantic scenes, she focused on conveying an atmosphere that would allow the readers to follow along with the characters, while for ordinary scenes, she used a variety of visual elements to keep the story interesting.

== Publication ==
Written and illustrated by Kashikaze, I Can't Say No to the Lonely Girl was serialized in Ichijinsha's Comic Yuri Hime magazine from October 18, 2019, to October 18, 2022. The series' chapters were collected in six tankōbon volumes released from April 16, 2020, to December 16, 2022.

The series was licensed for English-language release by Kodansha USA. Six volumes were released from March 19, 2024, to March 25, 2025.

No.	Original release date	Original ISBN	English release date	English ISBN
1	April 16, 2020	978-4-7580-2110-4	March 19, 2024	979-8-8887-7109-9
Chapters 1–5; Bonus Comic; Afterword
2	October 16, 2020	978-4-7580-2171-5	June 11, 2024	979-8-8887-7110-5
Chapters 6–10; Bonus Comic; Afterword
3	April 16, 2021	978-4-7580-2239-2	July 28, 2024	979-8-8887-7111-2
Chapters 11–15; Bonus Comic; Afterword
4	October 18, 2021	978-4-7580-2308-5	September 17, 2024	979-8-8887-7112-9
Chapters 16–20; Afterword
5	May 18, 2022	978-4-7580-2410-5	December 10, 2024	979-8-8887-7113-6
Chapters 21–23; Chapter 23.5; Chapters 24–25; Bonus Comic; Afterword
6	December 16, 2022	978-4-7580-2480-8	March 25, 2025	979-8-8887-7114-3
Chapters 26–32; Afterword

== Reception ==
The series won the 2021 Yuri Manga Awards, placing 1st among 205 nominees in a poll hosted by Yuri Navi, a news site dedicated to coverage of yuri manga.

Reviewers differed on the series' initial premise. Kevin Cormack of Anime News Network (ANN) called it "compelling and spicily problematic", praising the manga as an "impressive" first debut. On the other hand, Demelza of Anime UK News felt that the first volume became "uncomfortable at times" due to the main characters' forced proximity. Erica Friedman of Okazu described the premise as "kinda trashy, kinda funny", but opined that it soon "develop[s] into something worth reading". In a review of the second volume, she felt that "despite the goofy premise [...] the series has actually been quite gentle and sweet."

The story's characters were generally well received. Friedman spoke positively of Sora and Ayaka's portrayal, stating that "it's hard to not be rooting for [them]" as they navigate life. Similarly, Rebecca Silverman of ANN praised the story's depiction of character growth, concluding that she was "looking forward to seeing where it goes", while Lauren Orsini of ANN called the debut volume a "lovely progression of character development" with "cute, fluffy, moments".

Several critics praised the plot and story elements. Sara Smith of School Library Journal acclaimed the story as a "heart-aching romance" that avoided "overplaying" yuri tropes. Orsini offered a generally positive opinion, opining that the series has "charm [and] sincerity" despite its scenes being typical of the genre. Friedman commended the third volume in particular, calling it a "fantastic climax" for Ayaka's decision to pursue Sora and the moment where the "story gets good".

The series' art was met with favorable reactions. Smith praised the series as having "beautifully detailed illustrations" and "expressive character designs" that allowed for a strong portrayal of Ayaka's feelings, while Demelza spoke positively of the "very clean line art" and facial expressions. Cormack described the manga as "really cute", concluding that it "works well to tell a simple story [...] fairly lightweight but with a hint of spice."
