= Doughnuts Under a Crescent Moon =

Japanese manga series

- First tankōbon volume cover, featuring Hinako (left) and Sato (right).

欠けた月とドーナッツ (Kaketa Tsuki to Dōnattsu)
- Genre: Romance; Slice of life; Yuri
- Manga
- Written by: Shio Usui
- Published by: Ichijinsha
- English publisher: NA: Seven Seas Entertainment
- Magazine: Comic Yuri Hime
- Original run: March 18, 2019 – May 18, 2022
- Volumes: 4

Doughnuts Under a Crescent Moon (欠けた月とドーナッツ, Kaketa Tsuki to Dōnattsu) is a Japanese yuri manga series written and illustrated by Shio Usui. It was serialized in Ichijinsha's Comic Yuri Hime from March 2019 to May 2022. It is licensed in English by Seven Seas Entertainment.

== Plot ==
To make herself seem "normal" to her friends and coworkers, Uno Hinako throws herself in makeup, fashion, and trying to fall in love. But despite her best efforts, all her attempts at "normal" romance with men keep falling flat. A new normal emerges in the form of her connection with Asahi Sato, a sensible woman whom Hinako works with, just as she begins to fear that she might be alone forever. What starts as respect slowly moves into something more intimate.

== Publication ==
Written and illustrated by Shio Usui, Doughnuts Under a Crescent Moon was serialized in Ichijinsha's Comic Yuri Hime from March 18, 2019, to May 18, 2022. The series was collected in four tankōbon volumes from January 2020 to July 2022.

The series is licensed for an English release in North America by Seven Seas Entertainment.

No.	Original release date	Original ISBN	English release date	English ISBN
1	January 17, 2020	978-4-75802-076-3	February 23, 2021	978-1-64827-074-1
2	November 18, 2020	978-4-75802-183-8	August 10, 2021	978-1-64827-246-2
3	September 17, 2021	978-4-75802-296-5	June 28, 2022	978-1-63858-112-3
4	July 15, 2022	978-4-75802-443-3	March 21, 2023	978-1-63858-688-3

== Reception ==
The series has received positive reviews. Anime News Network gave the first and second volume of Doughnuts Under a Crescent Moon an overall A− rating, praising the series for tackling how adults deal with their own identities. Silverman noted in her review of volume 2 that Doughnuts Under a Crescent Moon was similar to another current yuri title, Whisper Me a Love Song, in that it appeared to have a protagonist that exhibited signs of being on the asexual or demisexual spectrum. While praising this from the point of view of representation, they did worry about the "conflation of homosexuality and asexuality in manga about queer characters" but were open to seeing how the series progressed with such themes.

Erica Friedman of Okazu gave the final volume an overall rating of 10 out of 10, praising the series as a whole and remarking that "this manga checks off so many of the things that makes a good manga for me – adult women building different kinds of relationships with the women around them, emotional intimacy of differing kinds with those women and adult women breaking free of the constraints put upon them by society, family and themselves."
