= Comic Yuri Hime =

Japanese manga anthology magazine

- Comic Yuri Hime cover (spring 2006), featuring art by Reine Hibiki
- Editor: Hiroshi Saito
- Categories: Yuri manga (currently); Shōjo manga (formerly)
- Frequency: Monthly
- First issue: July 2005
- Company: Ichijinsha
- Country: Japan
- Based in: Tokyo
- Language: Japanese
- Website: Official website

Comic Yuri Hime (コミック百合姫, Komikku Yuri Hime; lit. "Lily Princess Comics" or "Lesbian Princess Comics") is a Japanese manga anthology magazine published by Ichijinsha. It began as a quarterly publication supplement to Monthly Comic Zero Sum in July 2005, but was issued bimonthly on odd months from January 2011 to December 2016, when it became monthly. Kanako Umezawa has served as Comic Yuri Hime's Editor-in-Chief since 2017.

It is the successor to Yuri Shimai and features manga with the same yuri (lesbian) themes. Comic Yuri Hime was financially dependent upon Monthly Comic Zero Sum, but from 2008 on the magazine has become independent. To celebrate this, the eleventh volume, released on January 18, 2008, included an extra called Petit Yuri Hime, a collaboration of artists from Comic Yuri Hime, Comic Yuri Hime S and Yuri Hime: Wildrose. Comic Yuri Hime S was Comic Yuri Hime's male-targeted sister magazine.

== Serialized works ==
Serialized as of February 17, 2026 (April 2026 issue)	Heading (non-data)

	Title	Author	Starting issue	End issue	Note(s)
		2005			
001	Otome Cake	Mako Takahashi	Vol.1	Vol.8	
002	Kisses, Sighs, and Cherry Blossom Pink	Milk Morinaga	Vol.1	Vol.4	← Transferred from "Yuri Shimai" → Transferred to "Comic High!"
003	Kotonoha no Miko to Kotodama no Majo to	Miyabi Fujieda	Vol.1	Vol.4	← Transferred from "Yuri Shimai"
004	Shoujo Bigaku	CHI-RAN	Vol.1	Vol.7	
005	Strawberry Shake Sweet	Shizuru Hayashiya	Vol.1	Vol.14	← Transferred from "Yuri Shimai"
006	Nanami to Misuzu	Minakata Sunao	Vol.1	Vol.14	
007	First Love Sisters	Mako Komao （illustration） Mizuo Shinonome（characters） Reine Hibiki (scenario)	Vol.1	Vol.11	← Transferred from "Yuri Shimai"
008	Lily pollen is difficult to remove.	Lily Hoshino Shion Miura（author ）	Vol.1	2011.01	essay
009	Voiceful	Nawoko	Vol.2	Vol.8	
010	Spring, Summer, Fall, Winter	Eiki Eiki; Taishi Zaō	Vol.2	Vol.7	
011	Yozora no Ouji to Asayake no Hime	Mera Hakamada	Vol.2	Vol.8	
		2006			
012	Simoun	Hayase Hashiba（illustration） Studio Deen（Original）	Vol.3	Vol.5	
013	Tokimeki Mononoke Jogakkou	Banana Nangoku	Vol.4	Vol.21	
014	Ameiro Kochakan Kandan	Miyabi Fujieda	Vol.5	2011.11	
015	Apple Day Dream	Jounouchi Nene	Vol.6	Vol.18	
016	Junsui Adolescence	Kowo Kazuma	Vol.6	Vol.14	
017	Mermaid Line	Renjuurou Kindaichi	Vol.6	Vol.9	
		2007			
018	EPITAPH	Aya Shouoto	Vol.8	Vol.14	No publication after Vol.14
019	Gurenki	Takewakamaru	Vol.8	Vol.20	No publication after Vol.20
020	The Conditions of Paradise	Akiko Morishima	Vol.8	2013.07	
021	Aoi Shiro - Waltz of the Blue Castle	Fumotogawa Tomoyuki（written） Edoya Pochi（illustrated	Vol.9	Vol.11	
		2008			
022	Sweet Peach!	Tohko Mizuno（written & illustrated） Senju Chiyu（illustrated)	Vol.11	Vol.16	No publication after Vol.16
023	Hanjuku-Joshi	Akiko Morishima	Vol.11	Vol.16	
024	Fu-fu	Minamoto Hisanari	Vol.11	2013.03	← Transferred from Comic Yuri Hime S
025	Nekomedou Kokoro Ta	Mizuo Shinonome	Vol.12	2011.05	
026	Kono Negai ga Kanau nara	Mera Hakamada	Vol.13	Vol.16	
		2009			
027	Mizuiro Cinema	Hiyori Otsu	Vol.15	Vol.20	
028	Solfege - Sweet Harmony	Sawa Nanao	Vol.16	Vol.19	
029	Sayonara Folklore	Kowo Kazuma	Vol.17	Vol.21	
030	Sore ga Kimi ni Naru	Mera Hakamada	Vol.17	Vol.21	
031	Hime-koi	Matthew Masaki	Vol.17	Vol.21	
032	Renai Idenshi XX	Eiki Eiki; Taishi Zaō	Vol.18	2014.01	
		2010			
033	Mousou Honey	Hajime Mikuni	Vol.19	2011.01	
034	Renai Joshika	Akiko Morishima	Vol.19	2011.11	
035	Parlor Yurihime	Fujio	Vol.21	2011.01	Essay → Transferred to "Hirari"
		2011			
036	GIRLS UPRISING	Kazuaki （illustration） Makoto Fukami （author）	2011.01	2012.12	Cover story
037	Mugen no Minamo ni	Takasaki Yuuki	2011.01	2011.07	← Transferred from Comic Yuri Hime S
038	YuruYuri	Namori	2011.01	Currently serialized	← Transferred from Comic Yuri Hime S
039	Amai Yubisaki	Rokuroichi（illustration） Ayako Miyaki （author）	2011.03	2013.01	Novel
040	Yuri Dansh	Kurata Uso	2011.03	2014.07 (Note: Since 2015, the series has been serialized as "Ore to Yuri - Yuri Danshi Chapter 2.)	
040	Yuri Dansh	Kurata Uso	2015.01	2016.01	
041	Kimono Nadeshiko	Yakusa	2011.07	2014.05	
042	Rock it, GiRL!!	Minoru Tanaka	2011.09	2014.05	
043	Watashi Sekai o Kouseisuru Chiri no You na Nani ka.	Shuninta Amano	2011.11	2014.01	
		2012			
044	Inugami-san to Nekoyama-san	Kuzushiro	2012.01	2017.04	
045	Cirque Arachne	Nika Saida	2012.01	2013.01	
046	Utakai	Shigeta family （illustration） Shun Morita （author）	2012.05	2013.03	Novel
047	Shoujo Wakusei	Mami Kashiwabara	2012.09	2013.03	
048	Sentimental Dust	Rou Kawai	2012.11	2013.05	
049	Tsuki to Sekai to Étoile	Yuriko Takagami	2012.11	2015.03	
050	Yurinote	Nayuka Mine	2012.11	2014.05	essay
		2013			
051	Citrus	Saburouta	2013.01	2018.10	
052	Bousou Girls-teki Mousou Renaiteki Suteki Project	Rou Kawai	2013.07	2014.09	
		2014			
053	14 Juicy	Hikari Asada	2014.03	2016.07	
054	Yurippu Chu	Akiko Morishima	2014.03	2014.03	Series serialization
055	Chouchou Nannan	Jin Takemiya	2014.05	2015.03	
056	Love Death.	Kuzushiro	2014.05	2015.05	
057	Pavlov Girl	Nekota	2014.09	2015.09	
058	Momoiro Trance	Koruri	2014.11	2017.02	
		2015			
059	Kanaete! Yuri yousei	Minamoto Hisanari	2015.01	2018.02	
060	Tachibanakan To Lie Angle	Merryhachi	2015.01	2020.06	
061	NTR: Netsuzou Trap	Kodama Naoko	2015.01	2018.02	
062	12-bun no Etude	Nakahara Tsubaki	2015.03	2016.07	
063	Shoujo Shikkaku	Rou Kawai	2015.03	2016.05	
064	2DK, G Pen, Mezamashi Tokei.	Yayoi Oosawa	2015.03	2018.12	
065	Last Waltz	Ako Katakura	2015.03	2016.07	
066	Sumedo Jigoku no Inferno	Kasuga Sunao	2015.05	2016.07	
067	Prince Prince	Hibiki Aoto	2015.05	2016.07	
068	Honya no Hit	Itsuki Furukawa	2015.05	2016.09	
069	Tsuki ga Kirei Desu ne	Hachi Itō	2015.09	2020.01	
		2016			
070	Ato de Shimai Masu.	Meno	2016.03	2017.08	
071	Choco Mate	Ako Yamada	2016.05	2017.02	
072	Demi Life!	Pikachi Ohi	2016.11	2017.10	
		2017			
073	Ashita, Kimi ni Aetara	Hibiki Aoto	2017.01	2017.12	
074	Itsuka Minoreba	Asuka Nishi	2017.01	2018.02	
075	Shumatsu Nani shi ni Ikou?	Hitoto*	2017.01	2017.09	
076	If I Could Reach You	tMnR	2017.01	2020.12	
077	Now Loading...!	Mikan Uji	2017.01	2017.05	
078	Hare no Kuni no Apparedan	Eku Takeshima	2017.01	2017.05	
079	Mimi Mix!	Madoka Hirose	2017.01	2018.07	
080	Roku + Ichi Kurashi	APRICO* (Ume)	2017.01	2017.11	
081	Wataten!	Nanatsu Mukunoki	2017.01	2025.06	
082	Yuri Is My Job!	Miman	2017.01	Currently serialized	
083	Holmes-san wa Suiri ga Dekinai	Doromaru Numachi	2017.02	2017.11	
084	Shiori wo Sagasu Page-tachi	Kumosuzume	2017.11	2018.09	
085	Our Wonderful Days	Kei Hamuro	2017.12	2019.11	
		2018			
086	Kimi wa Shoujo	Fuji Nanatsu	2018.02	2018.07	
087	Koushin Koinu Ni Koibumi Wo	Tamasaki Tama	2018.03	2020.09	
088	Mirai no Fuufu Desu Kedo?	Yuu Nonaka	2018.03	2019.03	
089	Yume no Naka de Kimi wo Sagashite	Aya Oryuu	2018.03	2019.03	
090	Takane no Hana wa Usotsuki desu	Ameno	2018.04	2018.09	
091	Roid	Shiroshi	2018.04	2019.02	
092	Good-bye Dystopia	Hisona	2018.05	2019.07	
093	Prison Town He Youkoso	Neji	2018.05	2019.02	
094	Yurikon	Haru Hisakawa	2018.05	2019.03	
095	I Married My Best Friend To Shut My Parents Up	Kodama Naoko	2018.06	2018.08	short-term intensive series
096	Joshikousei to Ouji-chan	Kuunerin	2018.08	2019.06	
097	Our Teachers Are Dating!	Pikachi Oui	2018.08	2021.04	
098	Koi Nanka Daikirai	Kayako	2018.09	2018.12	Intensive serialization
099	Itoshi Koishi	Jin Takemiya	2018.10	2020.02	
100	Rin to shite Karen na Hana no you ni	Hiroaki	2018.10	2020.08	After a long hiatus, the series was discontinued in the August 2020 issue.
101	Scarlet	Chiri Yuino	2018.11	2019.12	
102	The Girl I Want Is So Handsome!	Yuama	2018.12	2019.11	
103	Salad Bowl	Keyyan	2018.12	2019.11	
104	Luminous = Blue	Kiyoko Iwami	2018.12	2019.11	
		2019			
105	Citrus+	Saburouta	2019.02	Currently serialized	
106	Days of Love at Seagull Villa	Kodama Naoko	2019.03	2020.10	
107	Whisper Me a Love Song	Eku Takeshima	2019.04	Currently serialized	
108	Warikitta Kankei desukara.	FLOWERCHILD	2019.04	2021.08	
109	Doughnuts Under a Crescent Moon	Shio Usui	2019.05	2022.07	Bimonthly serialization
110	Yumeguri Yurimeguri	Hazuki	2019.06	2021.04	
111	Kitanai Kimi ga Ichiban Kawaii	Manio	2019.08	2022.04	
112	Hello, Melancholic!	Yayoi Ohsawa	2019.08	2021.01	
113	Pocha Climb!	mintarou	2019.10	2020.09	
114	I Can't Say No to the Lonely Girl	Kashikaze	2019.12	2022.12	
		2020			
115	Kyou mo Hitotsu Yane no Shita	Ayu Inui	2020.01	2022.09	
116	semelparous	Jun Ogino	2020.01	Currently serialized	On hiatus
117	Oomuroke	Namori	2020.02	Currently serialized	
118	Futago Wazurai	Sakurano Itsuki	2020.03	2021.02	
119	Namekawa-san Won't Take a Licking!	Rie Ato	2020.04	2022.05	
120	Yurizukushi no Kyoushitsu de	Shiime	2020.04	2022.01	
121	The Summer You Were There	Yuama	2020.07	2024.03	
122	Folklore of Kudan	Nijiru	2020.08	2021.02	
123	I'm in Love with the Villainess	Aonoshimo（illustration） Inori（original author） Hanagata（original character design）	2020.08	Currently serialized	
124	Futari Escape	Shōichi Taguchi	2020.09	2023.02	
125	Asumi-chan Is Interested in Lesbian Brothels!	Kuro Itsuki	2020.09	Currently serialized	bimonthly serialization
126	Odoriba ni Skirt ga Naru	Utatane Yuu	2020.10	2025.10	bimonthly serialization
		2021			
127	I Married My Female Friend	Shio Usui	2021.01	2023.12	
128	My Girlfriend's Not Here Today	Kiyoko Iwami	2021.08	Currently serialized	
129	This is from Mother Star -Cardinals-	Kazuno Yuikawa	2021.08	2021.11	Short-term serialization
130	Chasing Spica	Chihiro Orihi	2021.08	Currently serialized	On hiatus
131	Does It Count If You Lose Your Virginity to an Android?	Yakinikuteishoku	2021.09	2026.02	
132	Throw Away the Suit Together	Keyyan	2021.10	2023.09	
133	Please Spoil Me, Hinamori-san!	tsuke	2021.11	2023.05	
		2022			
134	Natsu to Lemon to Overlay	Miyako Miyahara（artist） Ru（Author）	2022.06	2023.01	
135	Koharu and Minato: My Partner Is a Girl	Hiaruron; Tatsuma	2022.10	Currently serialized	Essay comic series
136	Aishita Bundake Aishite Hoshii!	Manio	2022.11	2023.12	
		2023			
137	Inkya Gal Demo Ikigaritai!	Tsukiko Kashiwagi	2023.01	Currently serialized	
138	Kono Yo de Ichiban Suteki na Owarikata	Shikushiku	2023.01	2024.07	
139	Naraku no Hanazono	Sakasana	2023.01	2024.12	bimonthly serialization
140	Herami Shimai wa Docchi mo Yanderu	Kaneko Aru	2023.01	2026.4	
141	Osoto Gohan wo Goissho ni	Hazuki	2023.02	2024.11	
142	Destroy It All And Love Me In Hell	Tamotsu Kuwabara	2023.04	Currently serialized	
143	Utsushicha Dame na Kao	FLOWERCHILD	2023.07	Currently serialized	
144	Kiraware Majo Reijou to Dansou Ouji no Kon'yaku	Chinmi Chiruha	2023.07	2025.03	
145	Garan no Hime	Koruse	2023.08	2025.10	
146	Shikabane Shoujo to Ai ga Omoi Sei Kishi no Toubatsu Gakuen Life	Arashi Hino	2023.08	2024.05	
147	I'm in Love with the Villainess: Maid's Kitchen	tsuke Inori（original author） Hanagata（original character design）	2023.08	2023.11	
148	The Lying Bride and the Same-Sex Marriage Debate	Kodama Naoko	2023.11	2024.10	
		2024			
149	Salvia no Bouquet	Yuuto Koga（illustration） 4ka enpitsu（original work）	2024.03	2025.04	
150	Gakeppuchi Reijou wa Kurokishi-sama wo Horesasetai	Somechime（illustration） Suou（original work）	2024.04	2025.11	
151	Sabori nara Hokenshitsu de Douzo?	Hibiki Aoto	2024.05	2025.11	
152	Genjitsu sekai demo shiawase ni shite kudasai ne?	Shiborikasuko	2024.06	2026.11	
153	Kanaria wa Kiraboshi no Yume o Miru	sheepD	2024.07	2026.03	
154	Muryoku Seijo to Munou Oujo ~Maryoku Zero de Shoukansareta Seijo no Isekai Kyuukokuki~	Tamasaki Tama	2024.07	Currently serialized	
155	Kimi ga Hoeru Tame no Uta wo,	Kashikaze	2024.09	Currently serialized	
156	Bokura no Ai wa Kimochi Warui	Shio Usui	2024.09	2026.06	
157	Uso kara Hajimaru Koi no Natsu -squall-	Rococo（illustration） LYCORIS（original work）	2024.10	2025.01	
		2025			
158	Yume to Koi de wa tsuriawanai	Torii Shizuku	2025.01	2025.08	Short-term serialization
159	Chou Shin-Uchuu Yori Ai wo Komete	Ashida Kawozu	2025.04	Currently serialized	
160	Haru no Hikari ni Nomarete mo	Nishina	2025.07	2026.03	bimonthly serialization
161	Mayu no Uta	Shikushiku	2025.09	Currently serialized	
162	Watashi Datte Seishun Shitai Desu yo, Hontou wa	Rin Ono	2025.09	Currently serialized	
163	Tayutau Koi no Chirikiwa ni	Yuama	2025.10	Currently serialized	bimonthly serialization
164	Hareta Hi no Doresukōdo	Ageharu	2025.11	Currently serialized	bimonthly serialization
165	Kimi no Sei Nan Dakara, Sekinin Totte yo ne	Touma	2025.12	Currently serialized	
		2026			
166	Hina-chan ga Ikiteru nara	Tsugumi Meme	2026.01	Currently serialized	
167	Hone ni Negai o, Hoshi ni Noroi o	Ikuta Hana	2026.02	Currently serialized	
168	Dareka Ookami-san no shitsuke-kata shirimasen ka?	Anmi Tsuki	2026.03	Currently serialized	
169	Zangai Shoujo, Kirakira na Sekai no Soko	Usami Miki	2026.04	Currently serialized	
170	Kami wa watashi o toritai tte ittemasu!	Chinmi Chiruha	2026.09	Currently serialized	
171	Barikyari JK mone senpai	Nanatsu Mukunoki	2026.09	Currently serialized	
172	Ijimete kureru kimi ga suki	Manio	2026.10	Currently serialized	
173	Seinaru hime no kakushi-goto	Mutsumi Aoki	2026.10	Currently serialized	
174	Datte koi wa tsukiyo ni tomorukara	meji	2026.11	Currently serialized	

== Yuri Hime @ Pixiv ==
Yurihime @ Pixiv is official Pixiv account for Yuri Hime. It updated on the 8th and 28th of every month. It is the successor to Nico Nico Yuri Hime.

=== Serialized works ===
- Ohmuroke (Namori)
- Superwomen in Love! Honey Trap and Rapid Rabbit (sometime)
- Yandere Meruko chan wa Senpai ga Suki (Amezawa Koma)
