= Ichijinsha =

Japanese publishing company

Ichijinsha Inc.
- Logo used since 2024

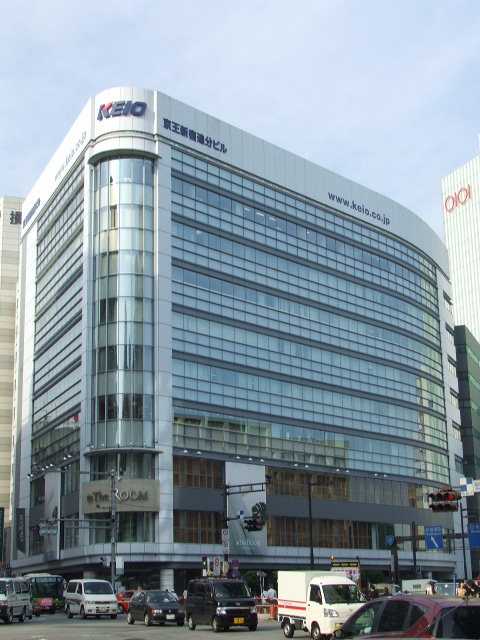
- Headquarters in Shinjuku, Tokyo
- Native name: 株式会社一迅社
- Romanized name: Kabushiki-gaisha Ichijinsha
- Formerly: Studio DNA Co., Ltd. (1992-2001)
- Type: Subsidiary (Kabushiki gaisha)
- Industry: Books, magazines, manga
- Founded: August 1992; 34 years ago
- Founder: Osamu Harada
- Headquarters: Shinjuku, Shinjuku, Tokyo, Japan
- Key people: Masahiro Nouchi (president)
- Revenue: ¥10 million
- Parent: Kodansha
- Website: www.ichijinsha.co.jp

Ichijinsha Inc. (Japanese: 株式会社一迅社, Hepburn: Kabushiki-gaisha Ichijinsha) is a Japanese publishing company focused on manga-related publication, including magazines and books.

The company was first established in August 1992 as a limited company under the name Studio DNA whose main purpose was to edit shōnen manga. In January 1998, Studio DNA became a public company and moved from merely editing to now being a publishing company. In December 2001, a publishing company was formed named Issaisha which started the shōjo manga magazine Monthly Comic Zero Sum. In March 2005, Studio DNA and Issaisha merged into the current Ichijinsha company. In October 2016, Ichijinsha was acquired by Kodansha and became its wholly owned subsidiary.

== Magazines published ==
- Comic Rex
- Monthly Comic Zero Sum
- Comic Yuri Hime
- gateau (primarily for Boys' Love manga)

=== Defunct magazines ===
- Comic Yuri Hime S
- Febri (formerly Chara☆Mel)
- Waai!
- Waai! Mahalo
- Comic Zero-Sum Zoukan WARD
- Manga Palette Lite
- Niconico Yuri Hime (web magazine, jointly with NicoNico Douga)
- Manga 4-Koma Palette
  - The four-panel comic strip magazine Manga 4-Koma Palette (まんが4コマぱれっと, Manga Yonkoma Paretto) started as a special edition of Comic Rex.
- THE IDOLM@STER MILLION LIVE! MAGAZINE Plus+, renewal of THE IDOLM@STER MILLION LIVE! MAGAZINE
- Purizm

=== Web magazines ===
- Zero Sum Online
- comic POOL (jointly with Pixiv primarily for webmanga)
- comic LAKE (primarily for Isekai stories aimed at women)
- Yurihime@Pixiv
- Niconico Yurihime
- Echo (jointly with Comic C'Moa primarily for women 20s-40s)
- LOVEBITES (jointly with Comic C'Moa primarily for Teens' love manga)
- Colorful Happiness (primarily translating korean webtoons aimed at women)
- Babydoll Comics (primarily for Teens' Love manga)
