= List of yuri works =

These lists display stories in anime and manga according to the role yuri plays in them. The first list contains examples of yuri works as an explicit or central theme, in which interpersonal attraction between females and the incorporation of lesbian themes play a central narrative plot in their genre or storylines. Such elements are labeled by publishers as yuri, and may include a lesbian character as the protagonist or a supporting character, or explorations of sexuality or gender that deviate from the hetero-normative. The second list contains examples of yuri works as a secondary or peripheral storyline, such as a romantic subplot, the presence of an important female character who is incidentally either lesbian, bisexual or other sapphic sexuality, as well as a noticeable amount of homoerotic-related implicit subtext or casual LGBT female representation.

== Yuri as a central or explicit element ==
=== Anime ===
| English title | Japanese title | Director | Studio | Type | FR | Regions | Ref. |
|---|---|---|---|---|---|---|---|
| Adachi and Shimamura | 安達としまむら; Adachi to Shimamura | Satoshi Kuwabara | Tezuka Productions | TV series | 2020 | JA/EN | |
| Adolescence of Utena | 少女革命ウテナ アドゥレセンス黙示録; Shōjo Kakumei Utena Aduresensu Mokushiroku | Kunihiko Ikuhara | J.C.Staff | Film | 1999 | JA/EN | |
| Bad Girl | ばっどがーる; Baddo Gāru | Jōji Furuta | Bridge | TV series | 2025 | JA/EN | |
| Bloom Into You | やがて君になる; Yagate Kimi ni Naru | Makoto Katō | Troyca | TV series | 2018 | JA/EN | |
| Botan Kamiina Fully Blossoms When Drunk | 上伊那ぼたん、酔へる姿は百合の花; Kamiina Botan, Yoeru Sugata wa Yuri no Hana | Takashi Sakuma | Soigne | TV series | 2026 | JA/EN | |
| Candy Boy | キャンディ ボーイ; Kyandi Bōi | Takafumi Hoshikawa | AIC | ONA | 2007 | JA | |
| Citrus | | Takeo Takahashi; Naoyuki Tatsuwa | Passione | TV series | 2018 | JA/EN | |
| Cosmic Princess Kaguya! | 超かぐや姫！ Chō Kaguya-hime! | Shingo Yamashita | Studio Colorido; Studio Chromato; Twin Engine | Film | 2026 | JA/EN | |
| Devil Lady | デビルマンレディー; Debiruman Redī | Toshiki Hirano | TMS Entertainment | TV series | 1998 | JA/EN | |
| Does It Count If You Lose Your Virginity to an Android? | アンドロイドは経験人数に入りますか？？ Andoroido wa Keiken Ninzū ni Hairimasu ka?? | Neko B | Nyan Pollution-ω- | TV series | 2026 | JA/EN | |
| El Cazador de la Bruja | エル・カザド; Eru Kazado | Kōichi Mashimo | Bee Train | TV series | 2007 | JA/EN | |
| Flip Flappers | フリップフラッパーズ; Furippu Furappāzu | Kiyotaka Oshiyama | Studio 3Hz | TV series | 2016 | JA/EN | |
| Fragtime | フラグタイム; Furagutaimu | Takuya Satō | Tear Studio; East Fish Studio | OVA | 2019 | JA/EN | |
| Gokujyo | ゴクジョッ。〜極楽院女子校寮物語〜 Gokujo. ~Gokurakuin Joshikōryō Monogatari~ | Futoshi Higashide | LMD | TV series | 2012 | JA | |
| Gushing over Magical Girls | 魔法少女にあこがれて; Mahō Shōjo ni Akogarete | Masato Suzuki; Atsushi Ōtsuki | Asahi Production | TV series | 2024 | JA/EN | |
| Happy Sugar Life | ハッピーシュガーライフ; Happī Shugā Raifu | Keizō Kusakawa; Nobuyoshi Nagayama | Ezóla | TV series | 2018 | JA/EN | |
| I Want to Love You Till Your Dying Day | きみが死ぬまで恋をしたい; Kimi ga Shinu made Koi o Shitai | Yasushi Tomoda | Roll2 | TV series | 2026 | JA/EN | |
| Ice | アイス; Aisu | Makoto Kobayashi | PPM | OVA | 2007 | JA/EN | |
| I'm in Love with the Villainess | 私の推しは悪役令嬢。 Watashi no Oshi wa Akuyaku Reijō. | Hideaki Ōba | Platinum Vision | TV series | 2023 | JA/EN | |
| Inugami-san to Nekoyama-san | 犬神さんと猫山さん; Inugami-san to Nekoyama-san | Shinpei Nagai | Seven | TV series | 2014 | JA/EN | |
| Kanamemo | かなめも; Kanamemo | Shigehito Takayanagi | Feel | TV series | 2009 | JA/EN | |
| Kannazuki no Miko | 神無月の巫女; Kannazuki no Miko | Tetsuya Yanagisawa | TNK | TV series | 2004 | JA/EN | |
| Kase-san and Morning Glories | あさがおと加瀬さん。 Asagao to Kase-san. | Takuya Satō | ZEXCS | OVA | 2018 | JA/EN | |
| Kashimashi: Girl Meets Girl | かしまし ～ガール・ミーツ・ガール～ Kashimashi ~Gāru Mītsu Gāru~ | Nobuaki Nakanishi | Studio Hibari | TV series | 2006 | JA/EN | |
| Konohana Kitan | このはな綺譚; Konohana Kitan | Hideki Okamoto | Lerche | TV series | 2017 | JA/EN | |
| Kuttsukiboshi | くっつきぼし; Kuttsukiboshi | Naoya Ishikawa | Primastea | OVA | 2010 | JA | |
| Love to Lie Angle | 立花館To Lieあんぐる; Tachibana-kan To Rai Anguru | Hisayoshi Hirasawa | Creators in Pack; Studio Lings | TV series | 2018 | JA/EN | |
| Maria Watches Over Us | マリア様がみてる; Maria-sama ga Miteru | Yukihiro Matsushita | Studio Deen | TV series | 2004 | JA/EN | |
| Maria Watches Over Us: Printemps | マリア様がみてる〜春〜 Maria-sama ga Miteru ~Haru~ | Yukihiro Matsushita | Studio Deen | TV series | 2004 | JA/EN | |
| Maria Watches Over Us: 3rd Season OVA | マリア様がみてる 3rdシーズン Maria-sama ga Miteru Sādo Shīzun | Yukihiro Matsushita | Studio Deen | OVA | 2006 | JA/EN | |
| Maria Watches Over Us: 4th Season | マリア様がみてる 4thシーズン Maria-sama ga Miteru Fōsu Shīzun | Toshiyuki Kato | Studio Deen | TV series | 2009 | JA/EN | |
| MiniYuri | みにゆり; MiniYuri | Seiya Miyajima | DMM.futureworks; W-Toon Studio | ONA | 2019 | JA | |
| Miss Kobayashi's Dragon Maid | 小林さんちのメイドラゴン; Kobayashi-san Chi no Meidoragon | Yasuhiro Takemoto | Kyoto Animation | TV series | 2017 | JA/EN | |
| Miss Kobayashi's Dragon Maid S | 小林さんちのメイドラゴンS; Kobayashi-san Chi no Meidoragon Esu | Tatsuya Ishihara; Yasuhiro Takemoto | Kyoto Animation | TV series | 2021 | JA/EN | |
| NTR: Netsuzou Trap | 捏造トラップ-NTR- Netsuzō Torappu -Enutīāru- | Hisayoshi Hirasawa | Creators in Pack | TV series | 2017 | JA/EN | |
| Otherside Picnic | 裏世界ピクニック; Ura Sekai Pikunikku | Takuya Satō | Liden Films; Felix Film | TV series | 2021 | JA/EN | |
| Ōmuro-ke: Dear Sisters | 大室家 dear sisters Ōmuro-ke Dīa Shisutāzu | Naoyuki Tatsuwa | Passione; Studio Lings | Film | 2024 | JA | |
| Ōmuro-ke: Dear Friends | 大室家 dear friends Ōmuro-ke Dīa Furenzu | Naoyuki Tatsuwa | Passione; Studio Lings | Film | 2024 | JA | |
| Revolutionary Girl Utena | 少女革命ウテナ; Shōjo Kakumei Utena | Kunihiko Ikuhara | J.C.Staff | TV series | 1997 | JA/EN | |
| Riddle Story of Devil | 悪魔のリドル; Akuma no Ridoru | Keizō Kusakawa | Diomedéa | TV series | 2014 | JA/EN | |
| Roll Over and Die: I Will Fight for an Ordinary Life with My Love and Cursed Sword! | 「お前ごときが魔王に勝てると思うな」 と勇者パーティを追放されたので、王都で気ままに暮らしたい "Omae Gotoki ga Maō ni Kateru to Omou na" to Yūsha Pāti o Tsuihō Sareta no de, Ōto de Kimama ni Kurashitai | Nobuharu Kamanaka | A.C.G.T | TV series | 2026 | JA/EN | |
| Sakura Trick | 桜Trick; Sakura Torikku | Kenichi Ishikura | Studio Deen | TV series | 2014 | JA/EN | |
| Shōjo Sect | 少女セクト; Shōjo Sekuto | Ryuki Midoriki | Amarcord | OVA | 2008 | JA | |
| Simoun | シムーン; Shimūn | Junji Nishimura | Studio Deen | TV series | 2006 | JA/EN | |
| Sono Hanabira ni Kuchizuke o: Anata to Koibito Tsunagi | その花びらにくちづけを: あなたと恋人つなぎ; Sono Hanabira ni Kuchizuke o: Anata to Koibito Tsunagi | Masayuki Sakoi | ChuChu | OVA | 2010 | JA | |
| Stardust Telepath | 星屑テレパス; Hoshikuzu Terepasu | Kaori | Studio Gokumi | TV series | 2023 | JA/EN | |
| Strawberry Panic! | | Masayuki Sakoi | Madhouse | TV series | 2006 | JA/EN | |
| Sweet Blue Flowers | 青い花; Aoi Hana | Kenichi Kasai | J.C.Staff | TV series | 2009 | JA/EN | |
| The Executioner and Her Way of Life | 処刑少女の生きる道; Shokei Shōjo no Bājin Rōdo | Yoshiki Kawasaki | J.C.Staff | TV series | 2022 | JA/EN | |
| The Magical Revolution of the Reincarnated Princess and the Genius Young Lady | 転生王女と天才令嬢の魔法革命; Tensei Ōjo to Tensai Reijō no Mahō Kakumei | Shingo Tamaki | Diomedéa | TV series | 2023 | JA/EN | |
| The Many Sides of Voice Actor Radio | 声優ラジオのウラオモテ; Seiyū Rajio no Ura Omote | Hideki Tachibana | Connect | TV series | 2024 | JA/EN | |
| The Vexations of a Shut-In Vampire Princess | ひきこまり吸血姫の悶々; Hikikomari Kyūketsuki no Monmon | Tatsuma Minamikawa | Project No.9 | TV series | 2023 | JA/EN | |
| There's No Freaking Way I'll be Your Lover! Unless... | わたしが恋人になれるわけないじゃん、ムリムリ！（※ムリじゃなかった!?） Watashi ga Koibito ni Nareru Wakenaijan, Muri Muri! (*Muri Janakatta!?) | Natsumi Uchinuma | Studio Mother | TV series | 2025 | JA/EN | |
| This Monster Wants to Eat Me | 私を喰べたい、ひとでなし; Watashi o Tabetai, Hitodenashi | Naoyuki Kuzuya; Yūsuke Suzuki | Studio Lings | TV series | 2025 | JA/EN | |
| Two Lovely Maid | どっちもメイド; Dotchi mo Meido | Naoya Ishikawa | Ishikawa Pro | OVA | 2004 | JA | |
| Valkyrie Drive: Mermaid | | Hiraku Kaneko | Arms | TV series | 2015 | JA/EN | |
| VTuber Legend: How I Went Viral After Forgetting to Turn Off My Stream | VTuberなんだが配信切り忘れたら伝説になってた; Buichūbā Nanda ga Haishin Kiriwasuretara Densetsu ni Natteta | Takuya Asaoka | TNK | TV series | 2024 | JA/EN | |
| Wataten!: An Angel Flew Down to Me | 私に天使が舞い降りた! Watashi ni Tenshi ga Maiorita! | Daisuke Hiramaki | Doga Kobo | TV series | 2019 | JA/EN | |
| Wataten!: An Angel Flew Down to Me: Precious Friends | 私に天使が舞い降りた!プレシャス・フレンズ; Watashi ni Tenshi ga Maiorita! Pureshasu Furenzu | Daisuke Hiramaki | Doga Kobo | Film | 2022 | JA/EN | |
| Whisper Me a Love Song | ささやくように恋を唄う; Sasayaku You ni Koi o Utau | Akira Mano | Cloud Hearts; Yokohama Animation Laboratory | TV series | 2024 | JA/EN | |
| Whispered Words | ささめきこと; Sasameki Koto | Eiji Suganuma | AIC | TV series | 2009 | JA/EN | |
| Young Ladies Don't Play Fighting Games | 対ありでした。 ～お嬢さまは格闘ゲームなんてしない～ Tai Ari Deshita. ~Ojō-sama wa Kakutō Gēmu Nante Shinai~ | Shōta Ihata | Diomedéa | TV series | 2026 | JA/EN | |
| Yuri Is My Job! | 私の百合はお仕事です! Watashi no Yuri wa Oshigoto Desu! | Hijiri Sanpei; Takahiro Majima | Passione; Studio Lings | TV series | 2023 | JA/EN | |
| Yurikuma Arashi | ユリ熊嵐; Yurikuma Arashi | Kunihiko Ikuhara | Silver Link | TV series | 2015 | JA/EN | |
| Yuri Seijin Naoko-san | 百合星人ナオコサン; Yuri Seijin Naoko-san | Tetsuya Takeuchi | Ufotable | OVA | 2012 | JA/EN | |
| YuruYuri | ゆるゆり; YuruYuri | Masahiko Ohta | Doga Kobo | TV series | 2011 | JA/EN | |
| YuruYuri♪♪ | ゆるゆり♪♪ YuruYuri♪♪ | Masahiko Ohta | Doga Kobo | TV series | 2012 | JA/EN | |
| YuruYuri Nachuyachumi! | ゆるゆり なちゅやちゅみ！ YuruYuri Nachuyachumi! | Hiroyuki Hata | TYO Animations | OVA | 2014 | JA | |
| YuruYuri Nachuyachumi!+ | ゆるゆり なちゅやちゅみ！+ YuruYuri Nachuyachumi!+ | Hiroyuki Hata | TYO Animations | OVA | 2015 | JA | |
| YuruYuri San Hai! | ゆるゆり さん☆ハイ！ YuruYuri San Hai! | Hiroyuki Hata | TYO Animations | TV series | 2015 | JA/EN | |
| YuruYuri, | ゆるゆり、 YuruYuri, | Daigo Yamagishi | Lay-duce | OVA | 2019 | JA | |

=== Manga ===
| English title | Japanese title | Artist | (Japan) Original edition | | English | | Ref. |
| | | | Publisher | FR | Publisher | FR | |
|---|---|---|---|---|---|---|---|
| 12 Dirty Deeds to Unite the Princess and Her Heroine | 姫と女勇者が結ばれるための12の聖行為; Hime to Onna Yūsha ga Musubareru Tame no 12 no Hijiri Kōi | Moridam | Houbunsha | 2021 | Seven Seas | 2025 | |
| 2DK, G Pen, Mezamashidokei | 2DK、Gペン、目覚まし時計。 Nidīkē, Jīpen, Mezamashidokei. | Yayoi Oosawa | Ichijinsha | 2015 | | | |
| 5 Seconds Before a Witch Falls in Love | 魔女が恋する5秒前; Majo ga Koisuru Go-byōmae | Zeniko Sumiya | Ichijinsha | 2018 | Seven Seas | 2022 | |
| A Curtain Call for You | 君のためのカーテンコール; Kimi no Tame no Kāten Kōru | Kiki Emoda ^{W} | Ichijinsha | 2023 | Kodansha | 2025 | |
| A White Rose in Bloom | メジロバナの咲く; Mejirobana no Saku | Asumiko Nakamura | Hakusensha | 2017 | Seven Seas | 2021 | |
| A Witch's Love at the End of the World | 世界の終わりと魔女の恋; Sekai no Owari to Majo no Koi | Kujira | Kadokawa | 2018 | Yen Press | 2020 | |
| A Yuri Manga That Starts With Getting Rejected in a Dream | 夢でフラれてはじまる百合; Yume de Furarete Hajimaru Yuri | Hijiki | Takeshobo | 2022 | Seven Seas | 2026 | |
| Adachi and Shimamura | 安達としまむら; Adachi to Shimamura | Mani ^{W} | Square Enix | 2016 | | | |
| Adachi and Shimamura | 安達としまむら; Adachi to Shimamura | Moke Yuzuhara ^{W} | ASCII Media Works | 2019 | Yen Press | 2021 | |
| After Hours | アフターアワーズ; Afutā Awāzu | Yuhta Nishio | Shogakukan | 2015 | Viz | 2017 | |
| Akatsuki-iro no Senpuku Majo | 暁色の潜伏魔女; Akatsuki-iro no Senpuku Majo | Mera Hakamada | Futabasha | 2006 | | | |
| Assorted Entanglements | 不揃いの連理; Fuzoroi no Renri | Mikanuji | Kadokawa | 2017 | Yen Press | 2023 | |
| Asumi-chan is Interested in Lesbian Brothels! | 彩純ちゃんはレズ風俗に興味があります！ Asumi-chan wa Rezu Fūzoku ni Kyōmi ga Arimasu! | Kuro Itsuki | Ichijinsha | 2020 | Seven Seas | 2022 | |
| Ayaka Is in Love with Hiroko! | 彩香ちゃんは弘子先輩に恋してる; Ayaka-chan wa Hiroko-senpai ni Koishiteru | Sal Jiang | Futabasha | 2023 | Tokyopop | 2026 | |
| Beauty and the Beast Girl | ぼっち怪物と盲目少女; Botchi Kaibutsu to Mōmoku Shōjo | Neji | Ichijinsha | 2017 | Seven Seas | 2019 | |
| Becoming a Princess Knight and Working at a Yuri Brothel | くっ殺せの姫騎士となり、百合娼館で働くことになりました。 Kukkorose no Himekishi to nari, Yuri Shōkan de Hataraku Koto ni Narimashita. | Hinaki | Takeshobo | 2020 | Seven Seas | 2024 | |
| Black and White: Tough Love at the Office | 白と黒～Black & White～, Shiro to Kuro ~Burakku Ando Howaito~ | Sal Jiang | Jitsugyo no Nihon Sha | 2020 | Seven Seas | 2022 | |
| Blue | ブルー; Burū | Kiriko Nananan | Magazine House | 1995 | Fanfare | 2006 | |
| Blue Drop | ブルー ドロップ; Burū Doroppu | Akihito Yoshitomi | MediaWorks; Akita Shoten | 2004 | | | |
| Bloom Into You | やがて君になる; Yagate Kimi ni Naru | Nakatani Nio | ASCII Media Works | 2015 | Seven Seas | 2017 | |
| Bloom Into You Anthology | やがて君になる 公式コミックアンソロジー; Yagate Kimi ni Naru: Kōshiki Komikku Ansorojī | Various authors | ASCII Media Works | 2018 | Seven Seas | 2021 | |
| Boyish^{2} | | Various authors | TOMBOYS | 2022 | TOMBOYS | 2022 | |
| Boys Gilding the Lily Shall Die!? | 百合にはさまる男は死ねばいい!? Yuri ni Hasamaru Otoko wa Shinuba Ii!? | Yomogimochi | Gentosha | 2021 | Tokyopop | 2024 | |
| Breasts Are My Favorite Things in the World! | 世界で一番おっぱいが好き！ Sekai de Ichiban Oppai ga Suki! | Wakame Konbu | Media Factory | 2017 | Yen Press | 2020 | |
| Catch These Hands! | 私の拳をうけとめて; Watashi no Kobushi wo Uketomete | murata | Kadokawa | 2018 | Yen Press | 2022 | |
| Cats and Sugar Bowls | 猫とシュガーポット; Neko to Shugā Potto | Yukiko | Gentosha | 2018 | Seven Seas | 2022 | |
| Chasing After Aoi Koshiba | 今日、小柴葵に会えたら; Kyō, Koshiba Aoi ni Aetara | Fly ^{W} | Ichijinsha | 2018 | Kodansha | 2021 | |
| Chasing Spica | スピカをつかまえて; Supika o Tsukamaete | Chihiro Orihi | Ichijinsha | 2021 | Seven Seas | 2024 | |
| Cheerful Amnesia | 明るい記憶喪失; Akarui Kioku Sōshitsu | Tamamushi Oku | Media Factory | 2016 | Yen Press | 2023 | |
| Chirality | キラリティー; Kiraritī | Satoshi Urushihara | Gakken | 1995 | CPM Manga | 1997 | |
| Citrus | | Saburouta | Ichijinsha | 2012 | Seven Seas | 2014 | |
| Citrus+ | | Saburouta | Ichijinsha | 2018 | Seven Seas | 2019 | |
| Cocoon Entwined | 繭、纏う; Mayu, Matou | Yuriko Hara | Kadokawa | 2018 | Yen Press | 2019 | |
| Cocytus | コキュートス; Kokyūtosu | Kodama Naoko | Ichijinsha | 2013 | | | |
| Common-Sense Monster | フツーと化け物; Futsū to Bakemono | Shinobu Shinotsuki ^{W} | Enterbrain | 2022 | Yen Press | 2025 | |
| Convenient Semi-Friend | 好都合セミフレンド; Kōtsugō Semi Furendo | Minori Chigusa | Houbunsha | 2023 | Yen Press | 2025 | |
| Days of Love at Seagull Villa | 海猫荘days Umineko-sō Deizu | Kodama Naoko | Ichijinsha | 2019 | Seven Seas | 2020 | |
| Dear Brother | おにいさまへ... Oniisama e... | Riyoko Ikeda | Shueisha | 1975 | | | |
| Dear NOMAN | | Neji | ASCII Media Works | 2019 | Yen Press | 2021 | |
| Desperate March for Love | 恋の絶望行進曲; Koi no Zetsubō Kōshinkyoku | Michika Tomizawa | Enterbrain | 2022 | Yen Press | 2025 | |
| Destroy It All And Love Me In Hell | ぜんぶ壊して地獄で愛して; Zenbu Kowashite Jigoku de Aishite | Tamotsu Kuwabara | Ichijinsha | 2023 | | | |
| Does It Count If You Lose Your Virginity to an Android? | アンドロイドは経験人数に入りますか？？ Andoroido wa Keiken Ninzū ni Hairimasu ka?? | Yakinikuteishoku | Ichijinsha | 2021 | Seven Seas | 2023 | |
| Double Your Pleasure – A Twin Yuri Anthology | 双子百合えっちアンソロジー; Futago Yuri Etchi Ansorojī | Various authors | Ichijinsha | 2020 | Seven Seas | 2021 | |
| Doughnuts Under a Crescent Moon | 欠けた月とドーナッツ; Kaketa Tsuki to Dōnattsu | Shio Usui | Ichijinsha | 2019 | Seven Seas | 2021 | |
| Éclair: A Girls' Love Anthology That Resonates in Your Heart | エクレア あなたに響く百合アンソロジー; Ekurea Anata ni Hibiku Yuri Ansorojī | Various authors | ASCII Media Works | 2016 | Yen Press | 2018 | |
| Eve and Eve | イヴとイヴ; Ivu to Ivu | Rouge Nagashiro | Ichijinsha | 2018 | Seven Seas | 2019 | |
| Even Though We're Adults | おとなになっても; Otona ni Nattemo | Takako Shimura | Kodansha | 2019 | Seven Seas | 2021 | |
| Failed Princesses | できそこないの姫君たち; Dekisokonai no Himegimi-tachi | Ajiichi | Takeshobo | 2018 | Seven Seas | 2020 | |
| Farewell to My Alter | さよならオルタ; Sayonara Oruta | Nio Nakatani | ASCII Media Works | 2019 | Yen Press | 2021 | |
| First Love Sisters | 初恋姉妹; Hatsukoi Shimai | Mizuo Shinonome ^{W} | Ichijinsha | 2003 | Seven Seas | 2007 | |
| Fragtime | フラグタイム; Furagutaimu | Sato | Akita Shoten | 2013 | Seven Seas | 2020 | |
| Fu~Fu | ふ～ふ; Fu~Fu | Hisanari Minamoto | Ichijinsha | 2009 | | | |
| Fujiyū Sekai | 不自由セカイ; Fujiyū Sekai | Kodama Naoko | Ichijinsha | 2012 | | | |
| Futari Escape | ふたりエスケープ; Futari Esukēpu | Shōichi Taguchi | Ichijinsha | 2020 | Seven Seas | 2022 | |
| Futaribeya: A Room for Two | ふたりべや; Futaribeya | Yukiko | Gentosha | 2014 | Tokyopop | 2018 | |
| Gakuen Polizi | 学園ポリーチェ; Gakuen Porīche | Milk Morinaga | Futabasha | 2012 | Seven Seas | 2014 | |
| Gamma | γ -ガンマ- Ganma | Jun Ogino | Shueisha | 2013 | | | |
| Girl Friends | ガールフレンズ; Gāru Furenzu | Milk Morinaga | Futabasha | 2006 | Seven Seas | 2012 | |
| Goodbye, My Rose Garden | さよならローズガーデン; Sayonara Rōzu Gāden | Dr. Pepperco | Mag Garden | 2018 | Seven Seas | 2020 | |
| Gunbured × Sisters | ガンバレッド×シスターズ; Ganbareddo x Shisutāzu | Wataru Mitogawa | Shogakukan | 2019 | Seven Seas | 2022 | |
| Gunjō | 羣青; Gunjō | Ching Nakamura | Kodansha; Shogakukan | 2007 | | | |
| Gushing over Magical Girls | 魔法少女にあこがれて; Mahō Shōjo ni Akogarete | Akihiro Ononaka | Takeshobo | 2019 | J-Novel Club | 2022 | |
| Hana & Hina After School | ハナとヒナは放課後; Hana to Hina wa Hōkago | Milk Morinaga | Futabasha | 2015 | Seven Seas | 2017 | |
| Hana Monogatari | 花物語; Hana Monogatari | Mari Ozawa ^{W} | Shueisha | 2013 | | | |
| Handsome Girl and Sheltered Girl | イケメン女と箱入り娘; Ikemen Gāru to Hakoiri Musume | majoccoid ^{W} | Ichijinsha | 2019 | Seven Seas | 2024 | |
| Hanjuku-Joshi | 半熟女子; Hanjuku-Joshi | Akiko Morishima | Ichijinsha | 2008 | JManga | 2012 | |
| Hayate Cross Blade | はやて×ブレード; Hayate Kurosu Burēdo | Shizuru Hayashiya | ASCII Media Works | 2003 | Seven Seas | 2008 ^{C} | |
| Happy Sugar Life | ハッピーシュガーライフ; Happī Shugā Raifu | Tomiyaki Kagisora | Square Enix | 2015 | Yen Press | 2019 | |
| Haru Natsu Aki Fuyu | 春夏秋冬; Haru Natsu Aki Fuyu | Eiki Eiki | Ichijinsha | 2007 | JManga | 2012 | |
| Hello, Melancholic! | ハロー、メランコリック！ Harō, Merankorikku! | Yayoi Ohsawa | Ichijinsha | 2019 | Seven Seas | 2022 | |
| Hen | 変 Hen | Hiroya Oku | Shueisha | 1995 | | | |
| How Do I Turn My Best Friend Into My Girlfriend? | どうしたら幼馴染の彼女になれますか!? Dōshitara Osananajimi no Kanojo ni Naremasu ka!? | Syu Yasaka | Takeshobo | 2020 | Seven Seas | 2024 | |
| How Do We Relationship? | 付き合ってあげてもいいかな; Tsukiatte Agete mo Ii kana | Tamifull | Shogakukan | 2018 | Viz | 2020 | |
| Hungry for You: Endo Yasuko Stalks the Night | 遠藤靖子は夜迷町に隠れてる; Endo Yasuko wa Yomayoichou ni Kakureteru | Flowerchild | Shonen Gahosha | 2016 | Seven Seas | 2018 | |
| I Can't Believe I Slept With You! | 一度だけでも、後悔してます。 Ichido Dake Demo, Kōkai Shitemasu. | Miyako Miyahara | ASCII Media Works | 2019 | Seven Seas | 2022 | |
| I Can't Say No to the Lonely Girl | ロンリーガールに逆らえない; Ronrī Gāru ni Sakaraenai | Kashikaze | Ichijinsha | 2019 | Kodansha | 2024 | |
| I Don't Know Which Is Love | どれが恋かがわからない; Dore ga Koi ka ga Wakaranai | Tamamushi Oku | Media Factory | 2021 | Yen Press | 2023 | |
| I Don't Need a Happy Ending | ハッピーエンドはいらない; Happī Endo wa Iranai | Mikanuji | Kadokawa | 2018 | Yen Press | 2023 | |
| I Love You So Much, I Hate You | 憎らしいほど愛してる; Nikurashii hodo Aishiteru | Yuni | Kadokawa | 2019 | Yen Press | 2020 | |
| I Married My Best Friend To Shut My Parents Up | 親がうるさいので後輩(♀)と偽装結婚してみた; Oya ga Urusai node Kōhai (♀) to Gisō Kekkon Shitemita | Kodama Naoko | Ichijinsha | 2018 | Seven Seas | 2019 | |
| I Married My Female Friend | 女ともだちと結婚してみた。 Onna Tomodachi to Kekkon Shitemita. | Shio Usui | Ichijinsha | 2020 | Seven Seas | 2023 | |
| I Want to Love You Till Your Dying Day | きみが死ぬまで恋をしたい; Kimi ga Shinu made Koi o Shitai | Nachi Aono | Ichijinsha | 2018 | Kodansha | 2025 | |
| I Won't Let Mistress Suck My Blood | ご主人様には吸わせません！ Goshujin-sama ni wa Suwasemasen! | Paderapollonorio | Takeshobo | 2022 | Seven Seas | 2025 | |
| If I Could Reach You | たとえとどかぬ糸だとしても; Tatoe Todokanu Ito da to shite mo | tMnR | Ichijinsha | 2016 | Kodansha | 2019 | |
| If My Favorite Pop Idol Made It to the Budokan, I Would Die | 推しが武道館いってくれたら死ぬ; Oshi ga Budōkan Ittekuretara Shinu | Auri Hirao | Tokuma Shoten | 2015 | Tokyopop | 2023 | |
| If We Leave on the Dot | 定時にあがれたら; Teiji ni Agaretara | Inui Ayu | Shodensha | 2018 | Manga Planet | 2020 | |
| If You Could See Love | もし、恋が見えたなら; Moshi, Koi ga Mietanara | Yuuki Nanaji ^{W} | Kadokawa | 2020 | Yen Press | 2021 | |
| I'm in Love with the Villainess | 私の推しは悪役令嬢。 Watashi no Oshi wa Akuyaku Reijō | AONOSHIMO ^{W} | Ichijinsha | 2020 | Seven Seas | 2021 | |
| I'm Not a Succubus! | サキュバスじゃないモン！ Sakyubasu Janai mon! | Horitomo | Kill Time Communication | 2016 | Seven Seas | 2022 | |
| Imōto ga Dekimashita. | 妹ができました。 Imōto ga Dekimashita. | Fumie Akuta | Shinshokan | 2015 | | | |
| Inugami-san to Nekoyama-san | 犬神さんと猫山さん; Inugami-san to Nekoyama-san | Kuzushiro | Ichijinsha | 2011 | | | |
| Iono-sama Fanatics | いおの様ファナティクス; Iono-sama Fanatikusu | Miyabi Fujieda | MediaWorks | 2004 | Infinity Studios | 2007 | |
| It's All Your Fault | 全部君のせいだ; Zenbu Kimi no Sei da | merryhachi | Shueisha | 2022 | Yen Press | 2025 | |
| Kanamemo | かなめも; Kanamemo | Shoko Iwami | Houbunsha | 2007 | | | |
| Kannazuki no Miko | 神無月の巫女; Kannazuki no Miko | Kaishaku | Kadokawa | 2004 | Tokyopop; Viz | 2008; 2016 | |
| Kase-san | 加瀬さん; Kase-san | Hiromi Takashima | Shinshokan | 2010 | Seven Seas | 2017 | |
| Kashimashi: Girl Meets Girl | かしまし ～ガール・ミーツ・ガール～ Kashimashi ~Gāru Mītsu Gāru~ | Yukimaru Katsura ^{W} | MediaWorks | 2004 | Seven Seas | 2006 | |
| Killing Me! | キリング・ミー！ Kiringu Mī! | Akiyama | Media Factory | 2017 | Yen Press | 2019 | |
| Kindred Spirits on the Roof | 屋上の百合霊さん; Okujō no Yurirei-san | Hachi Itō | Shinshokan | 2015 | Seven Seas | 2017 | |
| Kiss and White Lily for My Dearest Girl | あの娘にキスと白百合を; Ano Ko ni Kisu to Shirayuri o | Canno | Media Factory | 2013 | Yen Press | 2017 | |
| Kisses, Sighs, and Cherry Blossom Pink | くちびるためいきさくらいろ; Kuchibiru Tameiki Sakurairo | Milk Morinaga | Ichijinsha | 2005 | Seven Seas | 2013 | |
| Kiss the Scars of the Girls | 少女たちの痕にくちづけを; Shōjo-tachi no Kizuato ni Kuchizuke o | Aya Haruhana | Kadokawa | 2021 | Yen Press | 2023 | |
| Koharu and Minato: My Partner Is a Girl | 小春と湊 わたしのパートナーは女の子; Koharu to Minato: Watashi no Pātonā wa Onnanoko | Hyaluron; Daruma | Ichijinsha | 2022 | Seven Seas | 2026 | |
| Konohana Kitan | このはな綺譚; Konohana Kitan | Sakuya Amano | Gentosha | 2014 | Tokyopop | 2018 | |
| Kuchibeta Shokudō | くちべた食堂 | Bonkara | Enterbrain | 2021 | | | |
| Kyūketsuki-chan to Kōhai-chan | 吸血鬼ちゃん×後輩ちゃん; Kyūketsuki-chan to Kōhai-chan | Saku Takano | ASCII Media Works | 2017 | | | |
| Lilies Blooming in 100 Days | 100日後に咲く百合; 100-nichigo ni Saku Yuri | Muromaki | Media Factory | 2023 | Yen Press | 2025 | |
| Love Bullet | ラブ・バレット; Rabu Baretto | inee | Media Factory | 2023 | | | |
| Love My Life | | Ebine Yamaji | Shodensha | 2000 | | | |
| Love Vibes | | Erika Sakurazawa | Shueisha | 1996 | | | |
| Lycoris Recoil | リコリス・リコイル; Rikorisu Rikoiru | Yasunori Bizen ^{W} | Kadokawa | 2022 | Yen Press | 2024 | |
| Maka-Maka | | Torajirou Kishi | Bunkasha | 2003 | Kitty Media | 2008 | |
| Marrying the Dark Knight (For Her Money) | 崖っぷち令嬢は黒騎士様を惚れさせたい！ Gakeppuchi Reijō wa Kurokishi-sama o Horesasetai! | sometime ^{W} | Ichijinsha | 2024 | Kodansha | 2026 | |
| Miss Kobayashi's Dragon Maid | 小林さんちのメイドラゴン; Kobayashi-san Chi no Meidoragon | coolkyousinnjya | Futabasha | 2013 | Seven Seas | 2016 | |
| Miss Kobayashi's Dragon Maid: Elma's Office Lady Diary | 小林さんちのメイドラゴン エルマのOL日記; Kobayashi-san Chi no Meidoragon Eruma no Ōeru Nikki | Ayami Kazama ^{W} | Futabasha | 2017 | Seven Seas | 2019 | |
| Miss Savage Fang | サベージファングお嬢様 史上最強の傭兵は史上最凶の暴虐令嬢となって二度目の世界を無双する; Savage Fang Ojōsama: Shijō Saikyō no Yōhei wa Shijō Saikyō no Bōgyaku Reijō to Natte Nidome no Sekai o Musō Suru | Umashi ^{W} | Shueisha | 2022 | Yen Press | 2024 | |
| Miyuki-chan in Wonderland | 不思議の国の美幸ちゃん; Fushigi no Kuni no Miyuki-chan | CLAMP | Kadokawa | 1993 | Tokyopop; Viz | 2003; 2014 | |
| Mizuno and Chayama | 水野と茶山; Mizuno to Chayama | Yuhta Nishio | Kadokawa | 2018 | Yen Press | 2022 | |
| Monologue Woven For You | 君に紡ぐ傍白; Kimi ni Tsumugu Bōhaku | Syu Yasaka | Takeshobo | 2020 | Seven Seas | 2022 | |
| Monster-Colored Island | かいじゅう色の島; Kaijū-iro no Shima | Mitsuru Hattori | Fujimi Shobo | 2018 | Yen Press | 2025 | |
| Monster Wrestling | もんれす -異種格闘モンスター娘- Monresu -Ishu Kakutō Monsutā Musume- | Ganmarei ^{W} | Micro Magazine | 2017 | Yen Press | 2019 | |
| Monthly in the Garden with My Landlord | 毎月庭つき大家つき; Maitsuki Niwa-tsuki Ōya-tsuki | Yodokawa | Kadokawa | 2021 | Yen Press | 2023 | |
| Ms. Vampire Who Lives in My Neighborhood | となりの吸血鬼さん; Tonari no Kyūketsuki-san | Amatou | Media Factory | 2014 | | | |
| Mushroom Girls in Love | きのこ人間の結婚; Kinoko Ningen no Kekkon | Kei Murayama | Ohta | 2013 | Seven Seas | 2018 | |
| Murciélago | ムルシエラゴ; Murushierago | Kana Yoshimura | Square Enix | 2013 | Yen Press | 2017 | |
| My Date is a Total Ike woman | デート相手がイケメン♀だった件; Dēto Aite ga Ikemen ♀ Datta Kudan | Mutsumi Natsuo | TOMBOYS | 2023 | TOMBOYS | 2023 | |
| My Cute Little Kitten | 私の可愛い子猫ちゃん; Watashi no Kawaii Koneko-chan | Milk Morinaga | Galette | 2017 | Seven Seas | 2022 | |
| My Girlfriend's Not Here Today | 今日はカノジョがいないから; Kyō wa Kanojo ga Inai kara | Kiyoko Iwami | Ichijinsha | 2021 | Seven Seas | 2024 | |
| My Goddess is Precious Today, Too | 私の女神が今日も推せる ～これからも、いつまでも～ Watashi no Megami ga Kyō mo Oseru ~Korekara mo, Itsumademo~ | Kawauchi | ASCII Media Works | 2022 | Seven Seas | 2025 | |
| My Lesbian Experience With Loneliness | さびしすぎてレズ風俗に行きましたレポ; Sabishisugite Rezu Fūzoku ni Ikimashita Repo | Nagata Kabi | East Press | 2016 | Seven Seas | 2017 | |
| My Next Life as a Villainess Side Story: Girls Patch | 乙女ゲームの破滅フラグしかない悪役令嬢に転生してしまった... GIRLS PATCH; Otome Gēmu no Hametsu Furagu Shikanai Akuyaku Reijō ni Tensei Shiteshimatta... Gāruzu Patchi | Various authors | Ichijinsha | 2020 | Seven Seas | 2022 | |
| My Solo Exchange Diary | 一人交換日記; Hitori Kōkan Nikki | Nagata Kabi | Shogakukan | 2016 | Seven Seas | 2018 | |
| Namekawa-san Won't Take a Licking! | ナメられたくないナメカワさん; Nameraretakunai Namekawa-san | Rie Ato | Ichijinsha | 2020 | Seven Seas | 2022 | |
| Nameless Asterism | ななしのアステリズム; Nanashi no Asuterizumu | Kina Kobayashi | Square Enix | 2015 | Seven Seas | 2018 | |
| Now Loading...! | | Mikan Uji | Ichijinsha | 2016 | Seven Seas | 2019 | |
| NTR: Netsuzou Trap | 捏造トラップ-NTR- Netsuzō Torappu -Enutīāru- | Kodama Naoko | Ichijinsha | 2014 | Seven Seas | 2016 | |
| Octave | オクターヴ; Okutāvu | Haru Akiyama | Kodansha | 2008 | | | |
| Otherside Picnic | 裏世界ピクニック; Ura Sekai Pikunikku | Eita Mizuno ^{W} | Square Enix | 2018 | Square Enix | 2021 | |
| Our Teachers Are Dating! | 羽山先生と寺野先生は付き合っている; Hayama-sensei to Terano-sensei wa Tsukiatteiru | Pikachi Ohi | Ichijinsha | 2018 | Seven Seas | 2020 | |
| Our Wonderful Days | 徒然日和; Tsurezure Biyori | Kei Hamuro | Ichijinsha | 2017 | Seven Seas | 2019 | |
| Pandora in the Crimson Shell: Ghost Urn | 紅殻のパンドラ; Kōkaku no Pandora | Koushi Rikudou ^{W} | Kadokawa | 2012 | Seven Seas | 2015 | |
| Puella Magi Madoka Magica: The Movie -Rebellion- | 劇場版 魔法少女まどか☆マギカ[新編]叛逆の物語; Gekijōban Mahō Shōjo Madoka Magika (Shinpen): Hangyaku no Monogatari | Hanokage ^{W} | Houbunsha | 2013 | Yen Press | 2015 | |
| Pietà | ピエタ; Pieta | Nanae Haruno | Shueisha | 1998 | | | |
| Pink Candy Kiss | 冷たくて 柔らか; Tsumetakute Yawaraka | Ami Uozumi | Shueisha | 2022 | Viz | 2025 | |
| Qualia the Purple | 紫色のクオリア; Murasakiiro no Kuoria | Shirou Tsunashima ^{W} | ASCII Media Works | 2011 | Seven Seas | 2023 | |
| Rainbows After Storms | はなにあらし; Hana ni Arashi | Ruka Kobachi | Shogakukan | 2017 | Viz | 2024 | |
| Ren'ai Manga | レンアイマンガ; Ren'ai Manga | Kodama Naoko | Houbunsha | 2011 | | | |
| Revolutionary Girl Utena | 少女革命ウテナ; Shōjo Kakumei Utena | Chiho Saito | Shogakukan | 1996 | Viz | 2000 | |
| Rica 'tte Kanji!? | リカって感じ!? Rika tte Kanji!? | Rica Takashima | Terra | 1995 | ALC | 2003 ^{T} | |
| Riddle Story of Devil | 悪魔のリドル; Akuma no Ridoru | Sunao Minakata ^{W} | Kadokawa | 2012 | Seven Seas | 2015 | |
| Roll Over and Die: I Will Fight for an Ordinary Life with My Love and Cursed Sword! | 「お前ごときが魔王に勝てると思うな」 と勇者パーティを追放されたので、王都で気ままに暮らしたい "Omae Gotoki ga Maō ni Kateru to Omouna" to Yūsha Pāti o Tsuihō Sareta node, Ōto de Kimama ni Kurashitai | Sunao Minakata ^{W} | Micro Magazine | 2020 | Seven Seas | 2021 | |
| Run Away with Me, Girl | かけおちガール; Kakeochi Gāru | Battan | Kodansha | 2018 | Kodansha | 2022 | |
| Sakura Trick | 桜Trick; Sakura Torikku | Tachi | Houbunsha | 2011 | | | |
| Scarlet | スカーレット; Sukāretto | Chiri Yuino | Ichijinsha | 2018 | Seven Seas | 2020 | |
| School Zone Girls | スクールゾーン; Sukūruzōn | Ningiyau | Mag Garden | 2018 | Seven Seas | 2021 | |
| Secret of the Princess | お姫様のひみつ; Ohime-sama no Himitsu | Milk Morinaga | Shinshokan | 2012 | Seven Seas | 2017 | |
| semelparous | セメルパルス; Semeruparusu | Jun Ogino | Ichijinsha | 2019 | Seven Seas | 2021 | |
| She Loves to Cook, and She Loves to Eat | 作りたい女と食べたい女; Tsukuritai Onna to Tabetai Onna | Sakaomi Yuzaki | Kadokawa | 2021 | Yen Press | 2022 | |
| Sheep Princess in Wolf's Clothing | 狼の皮をかぶった羊姫; Ōkami no Kawa o Kabutta Hitsujihime | Mito | Takeshobo | 2020 | Seven Seas | 2023 | |
| Shiroi Heya no Futari | 白い部屋のふたり; Shiroi Heya no Futari | Ryoko Yamagishi | Shueisha | 1971 | | | |
| Shōjo Sect | 少女セクト; Shōjo Sekuto | Kenn Kurogane | Core Magazine | 2003 | | | |
| SHWD | | sono.N | Jitsugyo no Nihon Sha | 2020 | Seven Seas | 2022 | |
| Sister and Giant: A Young Lady Is Reborn in Another World | お姉さまと巨人 お嬢さまが異世界転生; Onē-sama to Watashi: Ojōsama ga Isekai Tensei | Be-con | Kadokawa | 2021 | Yen Press | 2024 | |
| Spoil Me Plzzz, Hinamori-san! | 甘えさせて雛森さん！ Amaesasete Hinamori-san! | tsuke | Ichijinsha | 2021 | Kodansha | 2024 | |
| Stardust Telepath | 星屑テレパス; Hoshikuzu Terepasu | Rasuko Ōkuma | Houbunsha | 2019 | | | |
| Still Sick | スティルシック; Sutiru Shikku | Akashi | Mag Garden | 2018 | Tokyopop | 2019 | |
| Strawberry Fields Once Again | ストロベリー・フィールズをもう一度; Sutoroberī Fīruzu o Mou Ichido | Kazura Kinosaki | ASCII Media Works | 2017 | Yen Press | 2020 | |
| Strawberry Panic! | | Takuminamuchi ^{W} | ASCII Media Works | 2003 | Seven Seas | 2007 | |
| Strawberry Shake Sweet | ストロベリーシェイクSweet; Sutoroberī Sheiku Suīto | Shizuru Hayashiya | Ichijinsha | 2003 | | | |
| Stray Little Devil | ストレイ リトル デビル; Sutorei Ritoru Debiru | Kotaro Mori | MediaWorks | 2004 | DrMaster | 2006 | |
| Superwomen in Love! Honey Trap and Rapid Rabbit | ヒーローさんと元女幹部さん; Hīrō-san to Moto Onna Kanbu-san | sometime | Ichijinsha | 2018 | Seven Seas | 2021 | |
| Sweet Blue Flowers | 青い花; Aoi Hana | Takako Shimura | Ohta | 2004 | Viz | 2017 | |
| Syrup: A Yuri Anthology | シロップ 社会人百合アンソロジー; Shiroppu: Shakaijin Yuri Ansorojī | Various authors | Futabasha | 2019 | Seven Seas | 2020 | |
| Tachibanakan To Lie Angle | 立花館To Lieあんぐる; Tachibana-kan To Rai Anguru | Merryhachi | Ichijinsha | 2014 | Digital Manga Publishing | 2017 | |
| Tenshi no Drop | 天使のどろっぷ; Tenshi no Doroppu | Chizuna Nakajima | Flex Comix | 2011 | | | |
| Tetragrammaton Labyrinth | 断罪者 -TETRAGRAMMATON LABYRINTH- Danzaisha -Tetoraguramaton Rabirinsu- | Ei Itou | Wani Books | 2005 | Seven Seas | 2007 | |
| The Anemone Feels the Heat | アネモネは熱を帯びる; Anemone wa Netsu o Obiru | Ren Sakuragi | Houbunsha | 2020 | Yen Press | 2025 | |
| The Conditions of Paradise | 楽園の条件; Rakuen no Jōken | Akiko Morishima | Ichijinsha | 2007 | Seven Seas | 2020 | |
| The Executioner and Her Way of Life | 処刑少女の生きる道; Shokei Shōjo no Bājin Rōdo | Ryo Mitsuya ^{W} | Square Enix | 2020 | Yen Press | 2022 | |
| The Fed-Up Office Lady Wants to Serve the Villainess | 限界OLさんは悪役令嬢さまに仕えたい; Genkai OL-san wa Akuyaku Reijō-sama ni Tsukaetai | Nekotarou | Akita Shoten | 2022 | Seven Seas | 2025 | |
| The Girl I Want Is So Handsome! | イケメンすぎです紫葵先パイ! Ikemen Sugi Desu Shiki-senpai! | Yuama | Ichijinsha | 2018 | Seven Seas | 2022 | |
| The Guy She Was Interested in Wasn't a Guy at All | 気になってる人が男じゃなかった; Ki ni Natteru Hito ga Otoko Janakatta | Sumiko Arai | Kadokawa | 2023 | Yen Press | 2024 | |
| The Last Uniform | 最後の制服; Saigo no Seifuku | Mera Hakamada | Houbunsha | 2004 | Seven Seas | 2007 | |
| The Lying Bride and the Same-Sex Marriage Debate | 嘘つき花嫁と同性結婚論; Usotsuki Hanayome to Doseikekkon-ron | Kodama Naoko | Ichijinsha | 2023 | Seven Seas | 2025 | |
| The Magical Revolution of the Reincarnated Princess and the Genius Young Lady | 転生王女と天才令嬢の魔法革命; Tensei Ōjo to Tensai Reijō no Mahō Kakumei | Harutsugu Nadaka ^{W} | ASCII Media Works | 2020 | Yen Press | 2022 | |
| The Many Sides of Voice Actor Radio | 声優ラジオのウラオモテ; Seiyū Rajio no Ura Omote | Umemi Makimoto ^{W} | ASCII Media Works | 2020 | | | |
| The Moon on a Rainy Night | 雨夜の月; Amayo no Tsuki | Kuzushiro | Kodansha | 2021 | Kodansha | 2023 | |
| The Murderer and Her Runaway Desire | ヤンデレお嬢様が担任教師を快楽堕ちさせる話; Yandere Ojōsama ga Tanninkyōshi o Kairaku Ochisaseru Hanashi | Aneido | Self-published | 2023 | Self-published | 2024 | |
| The Summer You Were There | 君と綴るうたかた; Kimi to Tsuzuru Utakata | Yuama | Ichijinsha | 2020 | Seven Seas | 2022 | |
| The Sword of Paros | パロスの剣; Parosu no Ken | Kaoru Kurimoto | Kadokawa | 1986 | | | |
| The Two of Them Are Pretty Much Like This | ふたりはだいたいこんなかんじ; Futari wa Daitai Konna Kanji | Takashi Ikeda | Gentosha | 2020 | Seven Seas | 2022 | |
| The Vexations of a Shut-In Vampire Princess | ひきこまり吸血姫の悶々; Hikikomari Kyūketsuki no Monmon | riichu ^{W} | Square Enix | 2021 | Square Enix | 2023 | |
| The Whole of Humanity Has Gone Yuri Except for Me | 私以外人類全員百合; Watashi Igai Jinrui Zen'in Yuri | Hiroki Haruse | Kadokawa | 2018 | Yen Press | 2021 | |
| The Witches' Marriage | 魔女ノ結婚; Majo no Kekkon | studio HEADLINE | Kadokawa | 2021 | Yen Press | 2023 | |
| There's No Freaking Way I'll be Your Lover! Unless... | わたしが恋人になれるわけないじゃん、ムリムリ！（※ムリじゃなかった!?） Watashi ga Koibito ni Nareru Wakenaijan, Muri Muri! (*Muri Janakatta!?) | Musshu ^{W} | Shueisha | 2020 | Seven Seas | 2023 | |
| This Monster Wants to Eat Me | 私を喰べたい、ひとでなし; Watashi o Tabetai, Hitodenashi | Sai Naekawa | ASCII Media Works | 2020 | Yen Press | 2024 | |
| Throw Away the Suit Together | 君としらない夏になる; Kimi to Shiranai Natsu ni Naru | Keyyang | Ichijinsha | 2021 | Seven Seas | 2024 | |
| Transparent Light Blue | 透明な薄い水色に; Toumei na Usui Mizuiro ni | Kiyoko Iwami | Ichijinsha | 2017 | Seven Seas | 2019 | |
| Uchi no Maid ga Uzasugiru! | うちのメイドがウザすぎる！ Uchi no Meido ga Uzasugiru! | Kanko Nakamura | Futabasha | 2016 | Kaiten Books | 2020 | |
| Vampeerz | ヴァンピアーズ; Vanpiāzu | Akili | Shogakukan | 2019 | Denpa | 2022 | |
| Voiceful | | Nawoko | Ichijinsha | 2004 | Seven Seas | 2007 | |
| VTuber Legend: How I Went Viral After Forgetting to Turn Off My Stream | VTuberなんだが配信切り忘れたら伝説になってた; Buichūbā Nanda ga Haishin Kiriwasuretara Densetsu ni Natteta | Roto Fujisaki ^{W} | Kadokawa | 2023 | | | |
| Watashi no Muchi na Watashi no Michi | 私の無知なわたしの未知; Watashi no Muchi na Watashi no Michi | Moto Momono | Kodansha | 2014 | | | |
| Watashi Sekai o Kōsei Suru Chiri no You na Nani ka. | 私の世界を構成する塵のような何か。 Watashi Sekai o Kōsei Suru Chiri no You na Nani ka. | Shuninta Amano | Ichijinsha | 2011 | | | |
| Watashi wa Kimi wo Nakasetai | 私は君を泣かせたい; Watashi wa Kimi wo Nakasetai | Aya Fumio | Hakusensha | 2016 | | | |
| Wataten!: An Angel Flew Down to Me | 私に天使が舞い降りた! Watashi ni Tenshi ga Maiorita! | Nanatsu Mukunoki | Ichijinsha | 2016 | | | |
| When Budding Lilies Blossom | 百合の蕾が咲く頃に; Yuri no Tsubomi ga Saku Koro ni | syou | Bunendo | 2018 | Fakku | 2020 | |
| When the Villainess Seduces the Main Heroine | 悪役令嬢が正ヒロインを口説き落とす話。 Akuyaku Reijō ga Sei Hiroin o Kudokiotosu Hanashi. | Kasai Fujii | Kadokawa | 2022 | Yen Press | 2024 | |
| Whenever Our Eyes Meet... A Women's Love Anthology | 社会人百合アンソロジー; Shakaijin Yuri Ansorojī | Various authors | Kadokawa | 2018 | Yen Press | 2019 | |
| Whisper Me a Love Song | ささやくように恋を唄う; Sasayaku You ni Koi o Utau | Eku Takeshima | Ichijinsha | 2019 | Kodansha | 2020 | |
| Whispered Words | ささめきこと; Sasameki Koto | Takashi Ikeda | Media Factory | 2007 | One Peace | 2014 | |
| Wicked Spot | ウィキッドスポット; Wikiddo Supotto | Sal Jiang | Kadokawa | 2024 | Kodansha | 2026 | |
| Works | | Eriko Tadeno | Office MONO | 1995 | ALC | 2006 | |
| Young Ladies Don't Play Fighting Games | 対ありでした。 ～お嬢さまは格闘ゲームなんてしない～ Tai Ari Deshita ~Ojō-sama wa Kakutō Gēmu Nante Shinai~ | Eri Ejima | Media Factory | 2020 | Seven Seas | 2021 | |
| Yuri Bear Storm | ユリ熊嵐; Yurikuma Arashi | Akiko Morishima ^{W} | Gentosha | 2014 | Tokyopop | 2019 | |
| Yuri Espoir | ゆりでなる♥えすぽわーる; Yuri de Naru ♥ Esupowāru | Mai Naoi | Tokuma Shoten | 2019 | Tokyopop | 2022 | |
| Yuri Is My Job! | 私の百合はお仕事です！ Watashi no Yuri wa Oshigoto Desu! | Miman | Ichijinsha | 2016 | Kodansha | 2019 | |
| Yuri Life | ゆりぐらし; Yurigurashi | Kurukuruhime | Kadokawa | 2018 | Yen Press | 2019 | |
| Yuri Monogatari | | Various authors | | | ALC | 2005 | |
| Yuri Seijin Naoko-san | 百合星人ナオコサン; Yuri Seijin Naoko-san | Kashmir | ASCII Media Works | 2005 | | | |
| YuruYuri | ゆるゆり; YuruYuri | Namori | Ichijinsha | 2008 | | | |

=== Light novels ===
| English title | Japanese title | Author | (Japan) Original edition | | English | | Ref. |
| | | | Publisher | FR | Publisher | FR | |
|---|---|---|---|---|---|---|---|
| A Lily Blooms in Another World | 異世界に咲くは百合の花; Isekai ni Saku wa Yuri no Hana | Ameko Kaeruda | Ainaka Publishing | 2018 | J-Novel Club | 2020 | |
| Adachi and Shimamura | 安達としまむら; Adachi to Shimamura | Hitoma Iruma | ASCII Media Works | 2012 | Seven Seas | 2020 | |
| Bloom into You: Regarding Saeki Sayaka | やがて君になる 佐伯沙弥香について; Yagate Kimi ni Naru: Saeki Sayaka ni Tsuite | Hitoma Iruma | ASCII Media Works | 2018 | Seven Seas | 2019 | |
| Did You Think My Yuri Was Just for Show? | わたしの百合も、営業だと思った？ Watashi no Yuri mo, Eigyō da to Omotta? | Neru Asakura | ASCII Media Works | 2023 | Yen Press | 2025 | |
| End Blue | エンドブルー; Endo Burū | Hitoma Iruma | ASCII Media Works | 2020 | | | |
| Girls' Life | ガールズライフ; Gāruzu Raifu | Uzuki Kimura | Singpoosha | 2005 | | | |
| Girls Kingdom | ガールズキングダム; Gāruzu Kingudamu | Nayo | Ainaka Publishing | 2014 | J-Novel Club | 2020 | |
| Girls' Revolution | ガールズ★レボリューション; Gāruzu Reboryūshon | Rinko Matsu | Singpoosha | 2006 | | | |
| Hitozuma Kyōshi ga Oshiego no Joshikōsei ni Dohamari Suru Hanashi | 人妻教師が教え子の女子高生にドはまりする話; Hitozuma Kyōshi ga Oshiego no Joshikōsei ni Dohamari Suru Hanashi | Hitoma Iruma | ASCII Media Works | 2024 | | | |
| Homunculus Tears: Alchemy for the Brokenhearted | ホムンクルスの涙～消えたいキミへの錬金術～ Homunkurusu no Namida ~Kietai Kimi e no Renkinjutsu~ | Inori | Inori Books | 2025 | Inori Books | 2025 | |
| I'm in Love with the Villainess | 私の推しは悪役令嬢。 Watashi no Oshi wa Akuyaku Reijō. | Inori | Ainaka Publishing | 2018 | Seven Seas | 2020 | |
| I'm in Love with the Villainess: She's so Cheeky for a Commoner | 平民のくせに生意気な！ Heimin no Kuse ni Namaiki na! | Inori | Ainaka Publishing | 2021 | Seven Seas | 2023 | |
| Maria Watches Over Us | マリア様がみてる; Maria-sama ga Miteru | Oyuki Konno | Shueisha | 1998 | | | |
| Miss Savage Fang | サベージファングお嬢様 史上最強の傭兵は史上最凶の暴虐令嬢となって二度目の世界を無双する; Sabeiji Fangu Ojōsama: Shijō Saikyō no Yōhei wa Shijō Saikyō no Bōgyaku Reijō to Natte Nidome no Sekai o Musō Suru | Kakkaku Akashi | Kadokawa | 2021 | Yen Press | 2024 | |
| My First Love's Kiss | 私の初恋相手がキスしてた; Watashi no Hatsukoi Aite ga Kisu Shiteta | Hitoma Iruma | ASCII Media Works | 2022 | Yen Press | 2024 | |
| Otherside Picnic | 裏世界ピクニック; Ura Sekai Pikunikku | Iori Miyazawa | Hayakawa Publishing | 2017 | J-Novel Club | 2019 | |
| Otomodachi Robo Choco | おともだちロボ チョコ; Otomodachi Robo Choco | Hitoma Iruma | ASCII Media Works | 2015 | | | |
| Qualia the Purple | 紫色のクオリア; Murasakiiro no Kuoria | Hisamitsu Ueo | ASCII Media Works | 2009 | Seven Seas | 2022 | |
| Roll Over and Die: I Will Fight for an Ordinary Life with My Love and Cursed Sword! | 「お前ごときが魔王に勝てると思うな」 と勇者パーティを追放されたので、王都で気ままに暮らしたい "Omae Gotoki ga Maō ni Kateru to Omouna" to Yūsha Pāti o Tsuihō Sareta node, Ōto de Kimama ni Kurashitai | kiki | Micro Magazine | 2018 | Seven Seas | 2020 | |
| Sekai no Owari no Niwa de | 世界の終わりの庭で; Sekai no Owari no Niwa de | Hitoma Iruma | ASCII Media Works | 2018 | | | |
| Seriously Seeking Sister! Ultimate Vampire Princess Just Wants Little Sister; Plenty of Service Will Be Provided! | とにかく妹が欲しい最強の吸血姫は無自覚ご奉仕中！ Tonikaku Imōto ga Hoshii Saikyō no Kyūketsuki wa Mujikaku Gohōshichū! | Hiironoame | TO Books | 2018 | J-Novel Club | 2019 | |
| Sexiled: My Sexist Party Leader Kicked Me Out, So I Teamed Up With a Mythical Sorceress! | 女だから、とパーティを追放されたので伝説の魔女と最強タッグを組みました！ Onna dakara, to Pāti o Tsuihō Sareta node Densetsu no Majo to Saikyō Taggu o Kumimashita! | Ameko Kaeruda | Overlap | 2018 | J-Novel Club | 2019 | |
| Side-By-Side Dreamers | そいねドリーマー; Soine Dorīmā | Iori Miyazawa | Hayakawa Publishing | 2018 | J-Novel Club | 2019 | |
| Strawberry Panic! | | Sakurako Kimino | MediaWorks | 2006 | Seven Seas | 2008 | |
| The Executioner and Her Way of Life | 処刑少女の生きる道; Shokei Shōjo no Bājin Rōdo | Mato Sato | SB Creative | 2019 | Yen Press | 2021 | |
| The Girl Who Wants to Be a Hero and the Girl Who Ought to Be a Hero | 勇者になりたい少女と、勇者になるべき彼女; Yūsha ni Naritai Shōjo to, Yū ni Naru Beki Kanojo | Inori | ASCII Media Works | 2023 | Yen Press | 2025 | |
| The Hero-Killing Bride | 勇者殺しの花嫁; Yūsha Koroshi no Hanayome | Aoikou | Hobby Japan | 2023 | J-Novel Club | 2025 | |
| The Magical Revolution of the Reincarnated Princess and the Genius Young Lady | 転生王女と天才令嬢の魔法革命; Tensei Ōjo to Tensai Reijō no Mahō Kakumei | Piero Karasu | Kadokawa | 2019 | Yen Press | 2022 | |
| The Many Sides of Voice Actor Radio | 声優ラジオのウラオモテ; Seiyū Rajio no Ura Omote | Kō Nigatsu | ASCII Media Works | 2020 | | | |
| The Vexations of a Shut-In Vampire Princess | ひきこまり吸血姫の悶々; Hikikomari Kyūketsuki no Monmon | Kotei Kobayashi | SB Creative | 2020 | Yen Press | 2022 | |
| There's No Freaking Way I'll be Your Lover! Unless... | わたしが恋人になれるわけないじゃん、ムリムリ！（※ムリじゃなかった!?） Watashi ga Koibito ni Nareru Wakenaijan, Muri Muri! (*Muri Janakatta!?) | Teren Mikami | Shueisha | 2020 | Seven Seas | 2023 | |
| VTuber Legend: How I Went Viral After Forgetting to Turn Off My Stream | VTuberなんだが配信切り忘れたら伝説になってた; Buichūbā Nanda ga Haishin Kiriwasuretara Densetsu ni Natteta | Nana Nanato | Fujimi Shobo | 2021 | J-Novel Club | 2022 | |
| Yuri Tama: From Third Wheel to Trifecta | 百合の間に挟まれたわたしが、勢いで二股してしまった話; Yuri no Aida ni Hasamareta Watashi ga, Ikioi de Futamata Shiteshimatta Hanashi | toshizou | Overlap | 2021 | J-Novel Club | 2022 | |

=== Visual novels ===
| English title | Japanese title | Developer | (Japan) Original edition | | | English | | | Ref. |
| | | | Publisher | Platform | FR | Publisher | Platform | FR | |
|---|---|---|---|---|---|---|---|---|---|
| A Kiss for the Petals - Maidens of Michael | その花びらにくちづけを ミカエルの乙女たち; Sono Hanabira ni Kuchizuke o: Mikaeru no Otome-tachi | Yurin Yurin | Yurin Yurin | Windows ^{18+} | 2012 | MangaGamer | Windows ^{18+} | 2018 | |
| A Kiss for the Petals - Maidens of Michael | その花びらにくちづけを ミカエルの乙女たち; Sono Hanabira ni Kuchizuke o: Mikaeru no Otome-tachi | Yurin Yurin | Yurin Yurin | Windows ^{18+} | 2012 | MangaGamer | Linux ^{18+} | 2018 | |
| A Kiss for the Petals - Maidens of Michael | その花びらにくちづけを ミカエルの乙女たち; Sono Hanabira ni Kuchizuke o: Mikaeru no Otome-tachi | Yurin Yurin | Moe App | Android ^{A} | 2017 | MangaGamer | Mac OS ^{18+} | 2018 | |
| A Kiss for the Petals - Maidens of Michael | その花びらにくちづけを ミカエルの乙女たち; Sono Hanabira ni Kuchizuke o: Mikaeru no Otome-tachi | Yurin Yurin | Moe App | iOS ^{A} | 2017 | MangaGamer | Windows ^{A} | 2018 | |
| A Kiss for the Petals - Maidens of Michael | その花びらにくちづけを ミカエルの乙女たち; Sono Hanabira ni Kuchizuke o: Mikaeru no Otome-tachi | Yurin Yurin | Hublots Inc. | Android ^{18+} | 2018 | MangaGamer | Linux ^{A} | 2018 | |
| A Kiss for the Petals - Maidens of Michael | その花びらにくちづけを ミカエルの乙女たち; Sono Hanabira ni Kuchizuke o: Mikaeru no Otome-tachi | Yurin Yurin | Hublots Inc. | Android ^{18+} | 2018 | MangaGamer | Mac OS ^{A} | 2018 | |
| A Kiss for the Petals - Remembering How We Met | その花びらにくちづけを 出会った頃の思い出に; Sono Hanabira ni Kuchizuke o: Deatta Koro no Omoide ni | Sei Mikaeru Joshi Gakuen | Moe App | Android ^{A} | 2015 | MangaGamer | Windows ^{A} | 2015 | |
| A Kiss for the Petals - Remembering How We Met | その花びらにくちづけを 出会った頃の思い出に; Sono Hanabira ni Kuchizuke o: Deatta Koro no Omoide ni | Sei Mikaeru Joshi Gakuen | Moe App | iOS ^{A} | 2015 | MangaGamer | Windows ^{A} | 2015 | |
| A Kiss for the Petals - Remembering How We Met | その花びらにくちづけを 出会った頃の思い出に; Sono Hanabira ni Kuchizuke o: Deatta Koro no Omoide ni | Sei Mikaeru Joshi Gakuen | Sei Mikaeru Joshi Gakuen | Windows ^{18+} | 2016 | MangaGamer | Linux ^{A} | 2015 | |
| A Kiss for the Petals - Remembering How We Met | その花びらにくちづけを 出会った頃の思い出に; Sono Hanabira ni Kuchizuke o: Deatta Koro no Omoide ni | Sei Mikaeru Joshi Gakuen | MangaGamer | Windows ^{A} | 2017 | MangaGamer | Linux ^{A} | 2015 | |
| A Kiss for the Petals - Remembering How We Met | その花びらにくちづけを 出会った頃の思い出に; Sono Hanabira ni Kuchizuke o: Deatta Koro no Omoide ni | Sei Mikaeru Joshi Gakuen | MangaGamer | Linux ^{A} | 2017 | MangaGamer | Mac OS ^{A} | 2015 | |
| A Kiss for the Petals - Remembering How We Met | その花びらにくちづけを 出会った頃の思い出に; Sono Hanabira ni Kuchizuke o: Deatta Koro no Omoide ni | Sei Mikaeru Joshi Gakuen | MangaGamer | Mac OS ^{A} | 2017 | MangaGamer | Mac OS ^{A} | 2015 | |
| A Kiss for the Petals - The New Generation! | その花びらにくちづけを にゅーじぇね！ Sono Hanabira ni Kuchizuke o: Nyū Jene! | Sei Mikaeru Joshi Gakuen | Sei Mikaeru Joshi Gakuen | Windows ^{18+} | 2015 | MangaGamer | Windows ^{18+} | 2016 | |
| Akai Ito | アカイイト; Akai Ito | Success | Success | PlayStation 2 | 2004 | Success | Nintendo Switch | 2023 | |
| Akai Ito | アカイイト; Akai Ito | Success | Hamster Corporation | PlayStation 3 | 2013 | Success | Nintendo Switch | 2023 | |
| Akai Ito | アカイイト; Akai Ito | Success | Success | Nintendo Switch | 2023 | Success | Windows | 2023 | |
| Akai Ito | アカイイト; Akai Ito | Success | Success | Windows | 2023 | Success | Windows | 2023 | |
| Amaranto | | Trifolium Garden | Trifolium Garden | Windows | 2008 | | | | |
| Anaheim Girl's Love Story | アナハイム・ガールズ・ラブストーリー; Anahaimu Gāruzu Rabusutōrī | Fan-na | Fan-na | Windows ^{18+} | 2009 | | | | |
| Aoi Shiro | アオイシロ; Aoi Shiro | Success | Success | PlayStation 2 | 2008 | Success | Nintendo Switch | 2023 | |
| Aoi Shiro | アオイシロ; Aoi Shiro | Success | Success | Windows | 2008 | Success | Nintendo Switch | 2023 | |
| Aoi Shiro | アオイシロ; Aoi Shiro | Success | Success | Nintendo Switch | 2023 | Success | Windows | 2023 | |
| ATOM GRRRL!! | | Cosmillica | Cosmillica | Windows ^{18+} | 2014 | Denpasoft | Windows ^{18+} | 2016 | |
| ATOM GRRRL!! | | Cosmillica | Cosmillica | Windows ^{18+} | 2014 | Sekai Project | Windows ^{A} | 2016 | |
| Dahlia | Dahlia-ダーリア- Dāria | Cosmillica | Cosmillica | Windows ^{18+} | 2014 | Kinkan édition | Windows ^{18+} | 2015 | |
| Distant Memoraĵo | いつかのメモラージョ ～ことのはアムリラート～ Itsuka no Memorājo ~Kotonoha Amurirāto~ | SukeraSparo | SukeraSparo | Windows | 2019 | MangaGamer | Windows | 2021 | |
| Distant Memoraĵo | いつかのメモラージョ ～ことのはアムリラート～ Itsuka no Memorājo ~Kotonoha Amurirāto~ | SukeraSparo | Moe App | Android | 2020 | MangaGamer | Windows | 2021 | |
| Distant Memoraĵo | いつかのメモラージョ ～ことのはアムリラート～ Itsuka no Memorājo ~Kotonoha Amurirāto~ | SukeraSparo | MangaGamer | Linux | 2021 | MangaGamer | Linux | 2021 | |
| Distant Memoraĵo | いつかのメモラージョ ～ことのはアムリラート～ Itsuka no Memorājo ~Kotonoha Amurirāto~ | SukeraSparo | MangaGamer | Mac OS | 2021 | MangaGamer | Mac OS | 2021 | |
| Ever Maiden | エヴァーメイデン ～堕落の園の乙女たち～ Evā Meidan ~Daraku no Sono no Otome-tachi~ | Liar-soft | Liar-soft | Windows ^{18+} | 2022 | Love Lab | Windows ^{18+} | TBD | |
| Ever Maiden | エヴァーメイデン ～堕落の園の乙女たち～ Evā Meidan ~Daraku no Sono no Otome-tachi~ | Liar-soft | ENTERGRAM | Nintendo Switch | 2023 | Love Lab | Windows ^{18+} | TBD | |
| Ever Maiden | エヴァーメイデン ～堕落の園の乙女たち～ Evā Meidan ~Daraku no Sono no Otome-tachi~ | Liar-soft | ENTERGRAM | PlayStation 4 | 2023 | Love Lab | Windows ^{18+} | TBD | |
| FLOWERS -Le volume sur automne- | | Innocent Grey | Innocent Grey | Windows | 2016 | JAST USA | Windows | 2020 | |
| FLOWERS -Le volume sur automne- | | Innocent Grey | Prototype | PlayStation Vita | 2016 | JAST USA | Windows | 2020 | |
| FLOWERS -Le volume sur automne- | | Innocent Grey | Prototype | PlayStation 4 | 2019 | JAST USA | Windows | 2020 | |
| FLOWERS -Le volume sur automne- | | Innocent Grey | Prototype | Nintendo Switch | 2019 | JAST USA | Windows | 2020 | |
| FLOWERS -Le volume sur été- | | Innocent Grey | Innocent Grey | Windows | 2015 | JAST USA | Windows | 2018 | |
| FLOWERS -Le volume sur été- | | Innocent Grey | Prototype | PlayStation Portable | 2015 | JAST USA | Windows | 2018 | |
| FLOWERS -Le volume sur été- | | Innocent Grey | Prototype | PlayStation Vita | 2015 | JAST USA | Windows | 2018 | |
| FLOWERS -Le volume sur été- | | Innocent Grey | Prototype | PlayStation 4 | 2019 | JAST USA | Windows | 2018 | |
| FLOWERS -Le volume sur été- | | Innocent Grey | Prototype | Nintendo Switch | 2019 | JAST USA | Windows | 2018 | |
| FLOWERS -Le volume sur hiver- | | Innocent Grey | Innocent Grey | Windows | 2017 | JAST USA | Windows | 2022 | |
| FLOWERS -Le volume sur hiver- | | Innocent Grey | Prototype | PlayStation Vita | 2018 | JAST USA | Windows | 2022 | |
| FLOWERS -Le volume sur hiver- | | Innocent Grey | Prototype | PlayStation 4 | 2019 | JAST USA | Windows | 2022 | |
| FLOWERS -Le volume sur hiver- | | Innocent Grey | Prototype | Nintendo Switch | 2019 | JAST USA | Windows | 2022 | |
| FLOWERS -Le volume sur printemps- | | Innocent Grey | Innocent Grey | Windows | 2014 | JAST USA | Windows | 2016 | |
| FLOWERS -Le volume sur printemps- | | Innocent Grey | Prototype | PlayStation Portable | 2014 | JAST USA | Windows | 2016 | |
| FLOWERS -Le volume sur printemps- | | Innocent Grey | Prototype | PlayStation Vita | 2014 | JAST USA | Windows | 2016 | |
| FLOWERS -Le volume sur printemps- | | Innocent Grey | Prototype | PlayStation 4 | 2019 | JAST USA | Windows | 2016 | |
| FLOWERS -Le volume sur printemps- | | Innocent Grey | Prototype | Nintendo Switch | 2019 | JAST USA | Windows | 2016 | |
| Hanahira! | はなひらっ！ Hanahira! | Fuguriya | Fuguriya | Windows | 2010 | | | | |
| Hanahira! | はなひらっ！ Hanahira! | Fuguriya | Moe App | Android | 2012 | | | | |
| Hanahira! | はなひらっ！ Hanahira! | Fuguriya | Moe App | iOS | 2012 | | | | |
| How To Make a Perfect Girlfriend | 素敵な彼女の作り方; Suteki na Kanojo no Tsukurikata | sushi_soft | sushi_soft | Windows ^{18+} | 2021 | sushi_soft | Windows ^{18+} | 2021 | |
| How To Make a Perfect Girlfriend | 素敵な彼女の作り方; Suteki na Kanojo no Tsukurikata | sushi_soft | sushi_soft | Windows ^{A} | 2021 | sushi_soft | Windows ^{A} | 2021 | |
| Kanda Alice mo Suiri Suru. | 神田アリスも推理スル。 Kanda Arisu mo Suiri Suru. | El Dia | El Dia | Nintendo Switch | 2021 | | | | |
| Kanda Alice mo Suiri Suru. | 神田アリスも推理スル。 Kanda Arisu mo Suiri Suru. | El Dia | El Dia | PlayStation 4 | 2022 | | | | |
| Kanda Alice mo Suiri Suru. | 神田アリスも推理スル。 Kanda Arisu mo Suiri Suru. | El Dia | El Dia | Windows | 2024 | | | | |
| Kashimashi ~Girl Meets Girl~ "Hajimete no Natsu Monogatari." | かしまし ～ガール・ミーツ・ガール～ 「初めての夏物語。」 Kashimashi ~Gāru Mītsu Gāru~ "Hajimete no Natsu Monogatari." | Vridge | Marvelous Entertainment | PlayStation 2 | 2006 | | | | |
| Kindred Spirits on the Roof | 屋上の百合霊さん; Okujō no Yurirei-san | Liar-soft | Liar-soft | Windows ^{18+} | 2012 | MangaGamer | Windows ^{18+} | 2016 | |
| Kindred Spirits on the Roof | 屋上の百合霊さん; Okujō no Yurirei-san | Liar-soft | Liar-soft | Windows ^{18+} | 2012 | MangaGamer | Linux ^{18+} | 2019 | |
| Kindred Spirits on the Roof | 屋上の百合霊さん; Okujō no Yurirei-san | Liar-soft | Liar-soft | Windows ^{18+} | 2012 | MangaGamer | Mac OS ^{18+} | 2019 | |
| Kochira, Hahanaru Hoshi yori | こちら、母なる星より; Kochira, Hahanaru Hoshi yori | Daisyworld | Nippon Ichi Software | Nintendo Switch | 2021 | | | | |
| Kochira, Hahanaru Hoshi yori | こちら、母なる星より; Kochira, Hahanaru Hoshi yori | Daisyworld | Nippon Ichi Software | PlayStation 4 | 2021 | | | | |
| Letters From a Rainy Day -Oceans and Lace- | ツユチル・レター～海と栞に雨音を～ Tsuyuchiru Retā ~Umi to Shiori ni Amaoto o~ | Lily spinel | Hublots Inc. | Windows | 2021 | Hublots Inc. | Windows | 2021 | |
| Lilium x Triangle | リリウム×トライアングル; Ririumu x Toraianguru | Petit Pajamas | Petit Pajamas | Windows ^{18+} | 2014 | JAST USA | Windows ^{18+} | 2019 | |
| Lilycle Rainbow Stage!!! | りりくる Rainbow Stage!!! Ririkuru Reinbō Sutēji!!! | PARTICLE | PARTICLE | Windows | 2016 | MangaGamer | Windows | 2019 | |
| Lilycle Rainbow Stage!!! | りりくる Rainbow Stage!!! Ririkuru Reinbō Sutēji!!! | PARTICLE | PARTICLE | Web | 2020 | MangaGamer | Windows | 2019 | |
| LipTrip ~My Boss Is My Heat Suppressant?!~ | リップ・トリップ～編集長はわたしの解熱剤～ Rippu Torippu ~Bosu wa Watashi no Genetsuzai~ | SukeraSomero | Hublots Inc. | Windows ^{A} | 2024 | Hublots Inc. | Windows ^{A} | 2024 | |
| LipTrip ~My Boss Is My Heat Suppressant?!~ | リップ・トリップ～編集長はわたしの解熱剤～ Rippu Torippu ~Bosu wa Watashi no Genetsuzai~ | SukeraSomero | Hublots Inc. | Windows ^{18+} | 2024 | Hublots Inc. | Windows ^{18+} | 2024 | |
| Lonely Yuri | 孤独に効く百合; Kodoku ni Kiku Yuri | Yoru no Hitsuji | Yoru no Hitsuji | Windows | 2011 | DLsite | Windows | 2012 | |
| Lonely Yuri | 孤独に効く百合; Kodoku ni Kiku Yuri | Yoru no Hitsuji | Yoru no Hitsuji | iOS | 2011 | DLsite | Windows | 2012 | |
| Love, Guitars, and the Nashville Skyline | 恋と、ギターと、青い空。 Koi to, Gitā to, Aoi Sora. | Cosmillica | Cosmillica | Windows ^{18+} | 2015 | Denpasoft | Windows ^{18+} | 2016 | |
| Love, Guitars, and the Nashville Skyline | 恋と、ギターと、青い空。 Koi to, Gitā to, Aoi Sora. | Cosmillica | Cosmillica | Windows ^{18+} | 2015 | Sekai Project | Windows ^{A} | 2016 | |
| Ne no Kami: The Two Princess Knights of Kyoto Part 1 | ねのかみ 京の都とふたりの姫騎士; Ne no Kami - Kyō no Miyako to Futari no Hime Kishi | Kuro Irodoru Yomiji | Kuro Irodoru Yomiji | Windows ^{18+} | 2015 | Denpasoft | Windows ^{18+} | 2016 | |
| Ne no Kami: The Two Princess Knights of Kyoto Part 1 | ねのかみ 京の都とふたりの姫騎士; Ne no Kami - Kyō no Miyako to Futari no Hime Kishi | Kuro Irodoru Yomiji | Kuro Irodoru Yomiji | Windows ^{A} | 2015 | Sekai Project | Windows ^{A} | 2016 | |
| Ne no Kami: The Two Princess Knights of Kyoto Part 2 | ねのかみ 京の都とふたりの姫騎士 後編; Ne no Kami - Kyō no Miyako to Futari no Hime Kishi - Kouhen | Kuro Irodoru Yomiji | Kuro Irodoru Yomiji | Windows ^{18+} | 2016 | Denpasoft | Windows ^{18+} | 2017 | |
| Ne no Kami: The Two Princess Knights of Kyoto Part 2 | ねのかみ 京の都とふたりの姫騎士 後編; Ne no Kami - Kyō no Miyako to Futari no Hime Kishi - Kouhen | Kuro Irodoru Yomiji | Kuro Irodoru Yomiji | Windows ^{18+} | 2016 | Sekai Project | Windows ^{A} | 2017 | |
| Nurse Love Addiction | 白衣性愛情依存症; Hakuisei Aijō Izonshō | Kogado Studio | Kogado Studio | PlayStation Vita | 2015 | Komodo | Windows | 2016 | |
| Nurse Love Addiction | 白衣性愛情依存症; Hakuisei Aijō Izonshō | Kogado Studio | Kogado Studio | Windows | 2015 | Komodo | Windows | 2016 | |
| Nurse Love Addiction | 白衣性愛情依存症; Hakuisei Aijō Izonshō | Kogado Studio | Kogado Studio | Nintendo Switch | 2018 | Komodo | PlayStation Vita | 2017 | |
| Nurse Love Addiction | 白衣性愛情依存症; Hakuisei Aijō Izonshō | Kogado Studio | Kogado Studio | Web | 2020 | Komodo | Nintendo Switch | 2019 | |
| Nurse Love Syndrome | 白衣性恋愛症候群; Hakuisei Ren'ai Shōkōgun | Kogado Studio | CyberFront | PlayStation Portable | 2011 | Komodo | PlayStation Vita | 2019 | |
| Nurse Love Syndrome | 白衣性恋愛症候群; Hakuisei Ren'ai Shōkōgun | Kogado Studio | Kogado Studio | Windows | 2012 | Komodo | PlayStation Vita | 2019 | |
| Nurse Love Syndrome | 白衣性恋愛症候群; Hakuisei Ren'ai Shōkōgun | Kogado Studio | Kogado Studio | PlayStation Vita | 2019 | Komodo | Windows | 2019 | |
| Nurse Love Syndrome | 白衣性恋愛症候群; Hakuisei Ren'ai Shōkōgun | Kogado Studio | Kogado Studio | Nintendo Switch | 2019 | Komodo | Windows | 2019 | |
| Nurse Love Syndrome | 白衣性恋愛症候群; Hakuisei Ren'ai Shōkōgun | Kogado Studio | Kogado Studio | Web | 2020 | Komodo | Nintendo Switch | 2019 | |
| OshiRabu: Waifus Over Husbandos | 推しのラブより恋のラブ; Oshi no Rabu yori Koi no Rabu | SukeraSomero | Hublots Inc. | Windows ^{A} | 2020 | Hublots Inc. | Windows ^{A} | 2020 | |
| OshiRabu: Waifus Over Husbandos | 推しのラブより恋のラブ; Oshi no Rabu yori Koi no Rabu | SukeraSomero | Hublots Inc. | Windows ^{18+} | 2020 | Hublots Inc. | Windows ^{18+} | 2020 | |
| OshiRabu: Waifus Over Husbandos | 推しのラブより恋のラブ; Oshi no Rabu yori Koi no Rabu | SukeraSomero | Moe App | Android ^{A} | 2020 | Moe App | Android ^{A} | 2020 | |
| OshiRabu: Waifus Over Husbandos | 推しのラブより恋のラブ; Oshi no Rabu yori Koi no Rabu | SukeraSomero | Moe App | iOS ^{A} | 2020 | Moe App | iOS ^{A} | 2020 | |
| OshiRabu: Waifus Over Husbandos | 推しのラブより恋のラブ; Oshi no Rabu yori Koi no Rabu | SukeraSomero | Prototype | Nintendo Switch | 2022 | Prototype | Nintendo Switch | 2022 | |
| OshiRabu: Waifus Over Husbandos ~Love･or･die~ | 推しのラブより恋のラブ ～ラブ・オア・ダイ～ Oshi no Rabu yori Koi no Rabu ~Rabu Oa Dai~ | SukeraSomero | Hublots Inc. | Windows ^{A} | 2021 | Hublots Inc. | Windows ^{A} | 2021 | |
| OshiRabu: Waifus Over Husbandos ~Love･or･die~ | 推しのラブより恋のラブ ～ラブ・オア・ダイ～ Oshi no Rabu yori Koi no Rabu ~Rabu Oa Dai~ | SukeraSomero | Hublots Inc. | Windows ^{18+} | 2021 | Hublots Inc. | Windows ^{18+} | 2021 | |
| OshiRabu: Waifus Over Husbandos ~Love･or･die~ | 推しのラブより恋のラブ ～ラブ・オア・ダイ～ Oshi no Rabu yori Koi no Rabu ~Rabu Oa Dai~ | SukeraSomero | Prototype | Nintendo Switch | 2022 | Prototype | Nintendo Switch | 2022 | |
| Sacrament of the Zodiac: The Confused Sheep and the Tamed Wolf | サクラメントの十二宮 乱れる仔ひつじと手懐く狼; Sakuramento no Jūnikyū: Midareru Kohitsuji to Tenazuku Ōkami | Kuro Irodoru Yomiji | Kuro Irodoru Yomiji | Windows ^{18+} | 2014 | Denpasoft | Windows ^{18+} | 2016 | |
| Sacrament of the Zodiac: The Confused Sheep and the Tamed Wolf | サクラメントの十二宮 乱れる仔ひつじと手懐く狼; Sakuramento no Jūnikyū: Midareru Kohitsuji to Tenazuku Ōkami | Kuro Irodoru Yomiji | Kuro Irodoru Yomiji | Android ^{18+} | 2014 | Denpasoft | Windows ^{18+} | 2016 | |
| Sapphism no Gensō | サフィズムの舷窓; Safizumu no Gensō | Liar-soft | Liar-soft | Windows ^{18+} | 2001 | | | | |
| SeaBed | シーベッド; Shībeddo | paleontology | paleontology | Windows | 2015 | Fruitbat Factory | Windows | 2017 | |
| SeaBed | シーベッド; Shībeddo | paleontology | Fruitbat Factory | Nintendo Switch | 2020 | Fruitbat Factory | Nintendo Switch | 2020 | |
| Secret Kiss is Sweet and Tender | 秘密のキスは甘くやさしく; Himitsu no Kisu wa Amaku Yasashiku | Rosetta | iMel Inc. | Nintendo Switch | 2022 | iMel Inc. | Nintendo Switch | 2022 | |
| Secret Kiss is Sweet and Tender | 秘密のキスは甘くやさしく; Himitsu no Kisu wa Amaku Yasashiku | Rosetta | MediBang Inc. | Windows ^{18+} | 2022 | MediBang Inc. | Windows ^{18+} | 2022 | |
| Seisai no Resonance | 星彩のレゾナンス; Seisai no Rezonansu | Yatagarasu | Yatagarasu | Windows ^{18+} | 2013 | | | | |
| Seven days with the Ghost | 彼女と彼女と私の七日 -Seven days with the Ghost- Kanojo to Kanojo to Watashi no Nanoka -Seven days with the Ghost- | Lilies Project | Lilies Project | Windows ^{18+} | 2010 | Denpasoft | Windows ^{18+} | 2018 | |
| Shōjo to Tsumi: Shiori Hen ~jalouse~ | 少女と罪 栞編 ～jalouse～ Shōjo to Tsumi: Shiori Hen ~jalouse~ | Pure Purple | Pure Purple | Android ^{A} | 2019 | Pure Purple | Android ^{A} | 2019 | |
| Shōjo to Tsumi: Shiori Hen ~jalouse~ | 少女と罪 栞編 ～jalouse～ Shōjo to Tsumi: Shiori Hen ~jalouse~ | Pure Purple | Pure Purple | Windows ^{A} | 2019 | Pure Purple | Windows ^{A} | 2019 | |
| Shōjo to Tsumi: Shiori Hen ~jalouse~ | 少女と罪 栞編 ～jalouse～ Shōjo to Tsumi: Shiori Hen ~jalouse~ | Pure Purple | Pure Purple | Windows ^{18+} | 2019 | Pure Purple | Windows ^{18+} | 2019 | |
| Sisterly Bliss ~Don't Let Mom Find Out~ | つい・ゆり ～おかあさんにはナイショだよ～ Tsui Yuri ~Okā-san ni wa Naisho da yo~ | eye★phon | eye★phon | Windows ^{18+} | 2016 | MangaGamer | Windows ^{18+} | 2018 | |
| Solfege | ソルフェージュ; Sorufēju | Kogado Studio | Kogado Studio | Windows | 2007 | | | | |
| Solfege | ソルフェージュ; Sorufēju | Kogado Studio | GungHo Works | PlayStation Portable | 2008 | | | | |
| Sono Hanabira ni Kuchizuke o | その花びらにくちづけを; Sono Hanabira ni Kuchizuke o | Fuguriya | Fuguriya | Windows ^{18+} | 2006 | | | | |
| Sono Hanabira ni Kuchizuke o: Amakute Hoshikute Torokeru Chū | その花びらにくちづけを あまくてほしくてとろけるちゅう; Sono Hanabira ni Kuchizuke o: Amakute Hoshikute Torokeru Chū | Fuguriya | Fuguriya | Windows ^{18+} | 2009 | | | | |
| Sono Hanabira ni Kuchizuke o: Amakute Otona no Torokeru Chū | その花びらにくちづけを あまくておとなのとろけるちゅう; Sono Hanabira ni Kuchizuke o: Amakute Otona no Torokeru Chū | Fuguriya | Fuguriya | Windows ^{18+} | 2010 | | | | |
| Sono Hanabira ni Kuchizuke o: Anata ni Chikau Ai | その花びらにくちづけを あなたに誓う愛; Sono Hanabira ni Kuchizuke o: Anata ni Chikau Ai | Fuguriya | Fuguriya | Windows ^{18+} | 2014 | | | | |
| Sono Hanabira ni Kuchizuke o: Anata o Suki na Shiawase | その花びらにくちづけを あなたを好きな幸せ; Sono Hanabira ni Kuchizuke o: Anata o Suki na Shiawase | Fuguriya | Fuguriya | Windows ^{18+} | 2008 | | | | |
| Sono Hanabira ni Kuchizuke o: Anata to Koibito Tsunagi | その花びらにくちづけを あなたと恋人つなぎ; Sono Hanabira ni Kuchizuke o: Anata to Koibito Tsunagi | Fuguriya | Fuguriya | Windows ^{18+} | 2007 | | | | |
| Sono Hanabira ni Kuchizuke o: Atelier no Koibito-tachi | その花びらにくちづけを アトリエの恋人たち; Sono Hanabira ni Kuchizuke o: Atorie no Koibito-tachi | Yurin Yurin | Yurin Yurin | Windows ^{18+} | 2013 | | | | |
| Sono Hanabira ni Kuchizuke o: Itoshisa no Photograph | その花びらにくちづけを 愛しさのフォトグラフ; Sono Hanabira ni Kuchizuke o: Itoshisa no Fotogurafu | Fuguriya | Fuguriya | Windows ^{18+} | 2008 | | | | |
| Sono Hanabira ni Kuchizuke o: Kuchibiru to Kiss de Tsubuyaite | その花びらにくちづけを 唇とキスで呟いて; Sono Hanabira ni Kuchizuke o: Kuchibiru to Kisu de Tsubuyaite | Fuguriya | Fuguriya | Windows ^{18+} | 2008 | | | | |
| Sono Hanabira ni Kuchizuke o: Lily Platinum | その花びらにくちづけを リリ・プラチナム; Sono Hanabira ni Kuchizuke o: Riri Purachinamu | Fuguriya | Fuguriya | Windows ^{18+} | 2011 | | | | |
| Sono Hanabira ni Kuchizuke o: Revolution! Rinagisa | その花びらにくちづけを れぼりゅーしょん！ りなぎさ; Sono Hanabira ni Kuchizuke o: Reboryūshon! Rinagisa | Fuguriya | Fuguriya | Windows ^{18+} | 2015 | | | | |
| Sono Hanabira ni Kuchizuke o: Shirayuki no Kishi | その花びらにくちづけを 白雪の騎士; Sono Hanabira ni Kuchizuke o: Shirayuki no Kishi | Yurin Yurin | Yurin Yurin | Windows ^{18+} | 2013 | | | | |
| Sono Hanabira ni Kuchizuke o: Tenshi no Akogare | その花びらにくちづけを 天使のあこがれ; Sono Hanabira ni Kuchizuke o: Tenshi no Akogare | Yurin Yurin | Yurin Yurin | Windows ^{18+} | 2013 | | | | |
| Sono Hanabira ni Kuchizuke o: Tenshi no Hanabira Zome | その花びらにくちづけを 天使の花びら染め; Sono Hanabira ni Kuchizuke o: Tenshi no Hanabira Zome | Fuguriya | Fuguriya | Windows ^{18+} | 2010 | | | | |
| Sono Hanabira ni Kuchizuke o: Tenshi-tachi no Harukoi | その花びらにくちづけを 天使たちの春恋; Sono Hanabira ni Kuchizuke o: Tenshi-tachi no Harukoi | Yurin Yurin | Yurin Yurin | Windows ^{18+} | 2013 | | | | |
| Sono Hanabira ni Kuchizuke o: Tenshi-tachi no Yakusoku | その花びらにくちづけを 天使たちの約束; Sono Hanabira ni Kuchizuke o: Tenshi-tachi no Yakusoku | Yurin Yurin | Yurin Yurin | Windows ^{18+} | 2014 | | | | |
| Sono Hanabira ni Kuchizuke o: Watashi no Ōji-sama | その花びらにくちづけを わたしの王子さま; Sono Hanabira ni Kuchizuke o: Watashi no Ōji-sama | Fuguriya | Fuguriya | Windows ^{18+} | 2007 | | | | |
| Sono Hanabira ni Kuchizuke o: Yuririn | その花びらにくちづけを ゆりりん; Sono Hanabira ni Kuchizuke o: Yuririn | Fuguriya | Fuguriya | Windows | 2015 | | | | |
| Strawberry Panic! Girls' School in Fullbloom | | MediaWorks | MediaWorks | PlayStation 2 | 2006 | | | | |
| The Curse of Kudan | クダンノフォークロア; Kudan no Fōkuroa | SukeraSparo | SukeraSparo | Windows | 2019 | SukeraSparo | Windows | 2020 | |
| The Curse of Kudan | クダンノフォークロア; Kudan no Fōkuroa | SukeraSparo | Moe App | Android | 2019 | SukeraSparo | Windows | 2020 | |
| The Curse of Kudan | クダンノフォークロア; Kudan no Fōkuroa | SukeraSparo | Moe App | iOS | 2019 | Prototype | Nintendo Switch | 2023 | |
| The Curse of Kudan | クダンノフォークロア; Kudan no Fōkuroa | SukeraSparo | Prototype | Nintendo Switch | 2023 | Prototype | Nintendo Switch | 2023 | |
| The Expression Amrilato | ことのはアムリラート; Kotonoha Amurirāto | SukeraSparo | SukeraSparo | Windows | 2017 | MangaGamer | Windows | 2019 | |
| The Expression Amrilato | ことのはアムリラート; Kotonoha Amurirāto | SukeraSparo | Moe App | Android | 2017 | MangaGamer | Windows | 2019 | |
| The Expression Amrilato | ことのはアムリラート; Kotonoha Amurirāto | SukeraSparo | Moe App | iOS | 2018 | MangaGamer | Linux | 2019 | |
| The Expression Amrilato | ことのはアムリラート; Kotonoha Amurirāto | SukeraSparo | MangaGamer | Linux | 2019 | MangaGamer | Linux | 2019 | |
| The Expression Amrilato | ことのはアムリラート; Kotonoha Amurirāto | SukeraSparo | MangaGamer | Mac OS | 2019 | MangaGamer | Mac OS | 2019 | |
| The Shadows of Pygmalion | 願いの欠片と白銀の契約者; Negai no Kakera to Hakugin no Agurīmento | propeller | propeller | Windows | 2013 | MangaGamer | Windows | 2017 | |
| UsoNatsu ~The Summer Romance Bloomed From A Lie~ | 嘘から始まる恋の夏; Uso kara Hajimaru Koi no Natsu | LYCORIS | LYCORIS | Windows | 2023 | Sekai Project | Windows | 2023 | |
| Wanting Wings: Her and Her Romance! | きみはね 彼女と彼女の恋する1ヶ月; Kimihane: Kanojo to Kanojo no Koi Suru Ikkagetsu | BaseSon Light | BaseSon Light | Windows ^{18+} | 2015 | MangaGamer | Windows ^{18+} | 2020 | |
| Wanting Wings: Her and Her Romance! | きみはねCouples ～彼女と彼女の恋する二ヶ月ちょっと～ Kimihane Kappuruzu ~Kanojo to Kanojo no Koi Suru Nikagetsu Chotto~ | BaseSon Light | BaseSon Light | Windows ^{18+} | 2019 | MangaGamer | Windows ^{A} | 2023 | |
| Watamari - A Match Made in Heaven Part1 | 私たちマリアージュ; Watashi-tachi Mariāju | Kuro Irodoru Yomiji | Kuro Irodoru Yomiji | Windows | 2022 | Sekai Project | Windows | 2022 | |
| Yukkuri Panic: Escalation | エスカレーション～狂愛のフーガ～ Esukarēshon ~Kyōai no Fūga~ | Rolling Star | Rolling Star | Windows ^{18+} | 2007 | Peach Princess | Windows ^{18+} | 2011 | |
| Yukkuri Panic: Escalation | ゆーくりパニック エスカレーション; Yūkuri Panikku Esukarēshon | Rolling Star | Rolling Star | Windows ^{18+} | 2008 | Peach Princess | Windows ^{18+} | 2011 | |
| Yumeutsutsu Re:After | 夢現Re:After; Yumeutsutsu Ri Afutā | Kogado Studio | Kogado Studio | Windows | 2020 | Komodo | Windows | 2020 | |
| Yumeutsutsu Re:After | 夢現Re:After; Yumeutsutsu Ri Afutā | Kogado Studio | Kogado Studio | Nintendo Switch | 2020 | Kogado Studio | Nintendo Switch | 2020 | |
| Yumeutsutsu Re:After | 夢現Re:After; Yumeutsutsu Ri Afutā | Kogado Studio | Kogado Studio | PlayStation 4 | 2020 | Kogado Studio | PlayStation 4 | 2020 | |
| Yumeutsutsu Re:After | 夢現Re:After; Yumeutsutsu Ri Afutā | Kogado Studio | Eastasiasoft | PlayStation Vita | 2021 | Komodo | PlayStation Vita | 2020 | |
| Yumeutsutsu Re:Idol | 夢現Re:Idol; Yumeutsutsu Ri Aidoru | Kogado Studio | Kogado Studio | Windows | 2020 | | | | |
| Yumeutsutsu Re:Idol | 夢現Re:Idol; Yumeutsutsu Ri Aidoru | Kogado Studio | Kogado Studio | Nintendo Switch | 2020 | | | | |
| Yumeutsutsu Re:Master | 夢現Re:Master; Yumeutsutsu Ri Masutā | Kogado Studio | Kogado Studio | Windows | 2019 | Komodo | Windows | 2020 | |
| Yumeutsutsu Re:Master | 夢現Re:Master; Yumeutsutsu Ri Masutā | Kogado Studio | Kogado Studio | Nintendo Switch | 2019 | Komodo | Nintendo Switch | 2020 | |
| Yumeutsutsu Re:Master | 夢現Re:Master; Yumeutsutsu Ri Masutā | Kogado Studio | Kogado Studio | PlayStation 4 | 2019 | Komodo | PlayStation 4 | 2020 | |
| Yumeutsutsu Re:Master | 夢現Re:Master; Yumeutsutsu Ri Masutā | Kogado Studio | Kogado Studio | PlayStation Vita | 2019 | Komodo | PlayStation Vita | 2020 | |
| Yumeutsutsu Re:Master | 夢現Re:Master; Yumeutsutsu Ri Masutā | Kogado Studio | Kogado Studio | Web | 2020 | Komodo | PlayStation Vita | 2020 | |

== Yuri as a secondary or peripheral element ==
- .hack//Sign
- A Centaur's Life
- Ace o Nerae!
- A Certain Scientific Railgun
- A Channel
- Agent Aika
- Air Master
- Akikan!
- Amuri in Star Ocean
- Anata to Scandal
- Angel/Dust
- Anima Yell!
- Aria the Scarlet Ammo AA
- Assault Lily
- Attack on Titan
- Avenger
- Azumanga Daioh
- Battle Athletes Victory
- Battle Girls: Time Paradox
- Ben-To
- Best Student Council
- Bodacious Space Pirates
- Bubblegum Crisis
- Burst Angel
- Cardcaptor Sakura
- Choir!
- Chu-Bra!!
- Comic Girls
- Confidential Confessions
- Cosplay Complex
- Cross Ange
- Cutie Honey
- Cyber Team in Akihabara
- Darling in the Franxx
- Diebuster
- Doki Doki School Hours
- El-Hazard
- Endro!
- Fate/kaleid liner Prisma Illya
- Fight! Iczer One
- From the New World
- Gakuen Alice
- Galaxy Fraulein Yuna
- Girls Bravo
- Godannar
- Go! Go! 575
- Gunsmith Cats Burst
- Hanaukyo Maid Team: La Verite
- He Is My Master
- Hina Logi ~from Luck & Logic~
- Ikki Tousen
- Inu x Boku SS
- Jormungand
- Kagihime
- Kaguyahime
- Kakegurui – Compulsive Gambler
- Kamen no Maid Guy
- Katsugeki Shōjo Tanteidan
- Kiddy Girl-and
- Kill la Kill
- Kin-iro Mosaic'
- Koihime Musō
- Kyōkaisen-jō no Horizon
- Lady Snowblood
- Loveless
- Madlax
- Magical Girl Lyrical Nanoha
- Magical Girl Ore
- Magical Girl Raising Project
- Magical Girl Spec-Ops Asuka
- Maze
- Mikagura School Suite
- Mito's Great Adventure: The Two Queens
- Mnemosyne
- Mobile Suit Gundam: The Witch from Mercury
- Modern Magic Made Simple
- Ms. Koizumi Loves Ramen Noodles
- My-HiME
- My-Otome
- Myself ; Yourself
- Najica Blitz Tactics
- Negima!: Magister Negi Magi
- Negima!?
- Ninja Nonsense
- Non Non Biyori
- Penguindrum
- Penguin Musume
- Plastic Little
- Project A-ko
- Puni Puni Poemy
- Queen's Blade
- Rakka Ryūsui
- Red Garden
- Revue Starlight
- RG Veda
- Riding Bean
- R.O.D the TV
- S.S. Astro
- Sabagebu!
- Sailor Moon
- Saki
- Sakura no Sono
- Sasami: Magical Girls Club
- Scum's Wish
- Seraphim Call
- Shattered Angels
- Slow Start
- Squid Girl
- Steel Angel Kurumi
- Stellvia of the Universe
- Str.A.In.
- Stratos 4
- Strawberry Marshmallow
- Strike Witches
- Symphogear
- Tactical Roar
- Tamako Market
- The Girl in Twilight
- The Qwaser of Stigmata
- The Rose of Versailles
- Touka Gettan
- Ultimate Girls
- Uta Kata
- Vampire Princess Miyu
- Vandread
- Venus Versus Virus
- Vividred Operation
- X/1999
- Yami to Bōshi to Hon no Tabibito
- Yokohama Kaidashi Kikou

== See also ==
- List of GL dramas
