= 5 Seconds Before a Witch Falls in Love =

Japanese manga series

- English volume cover

魔女が恋する5秒前 (Majo ga Koisuru 5-byōmae)
- Genre: Romance; Fantasy; Yuri
- Manga
- Written by: Zeniko Sumiya
- Published by: Ichijinsha
- English publisher: NA: Seven Seas Entertainment
- Magazine: Comic Yuri Hime
- Original run: October 19, 2018 – May 18, 2020
- Volumes: 1

5 Seconds Before a Witch Falls in Love (Japanese: 魔女が恋する5秒前, Hepburn: Majo ga Koisuru 5-byōmae) is a Japanese yuri manga series written and illustrated by Zeniko Sumiya. It was published in Ichijinsha's Comic Yuri Hime as a series of one-shots from October 2018, to May 2020, before being collected into a single tankōbon volume in 2020. It is licensed for an English-language release by Seven Seas Entertainment.

== Synopsis ==
Meg, a great but solitary witch, and Lilith, a witch hunter, are sworn enemies who are always quarrelling in the forest. However, after transforming Lilith into a cat, Meg finally outdoes Lilith. The spell can only be broken if Lilith kisses the one who cast it, and in the face of this deadlock the two women find themselves on the verge of finally understanding their feelings for each other.

== Publication ==
Written and illustrated by Zeniko Sumiya, 5 Seconds Before a Witch Falls in Love was serialized in Ichijinsha's Comic Yuri Hime as a series of one-shots, 5 Seconds Before a Witch Falls in Love, Demons Harem and 5 Seconds Before Falling in Love With a Witch, from October 19, 2018, to May 18, 2020. The series was collected into a tankōbon volume on September 29, 2020.

The series is licensed for an English release in North America by Seven Seas Entertainment.

No.	Original release date	Original ISBN	English release date	English ISBN
1	September 29, 2020	978-4-75802-160-9	February 1, 2022	978-1-64827-887-7

== Reception ==
Rebecca Silverman for Anime News Network gave 5 Seconds Before a Witch Falls in Love an overall B rating; remarking that while the order of the one-shots presented in the book can make reading unnecessarily choppy, the stories themselves are still very strong. Silverman noted that "Simply put, this book is adorable. There's a real charm to most of the stories in it no matter who they're about, but it doesn't overtake the plots to the point where they become gooey messes."

5 Seconds Before a Witch Falls in Love was featured on BookWalker's top-selling manga for 2022.
