= The Witches' Marriage =

Japanese manga series

- Japanese cover for Volume 1

魔女ノ結婚 (Majo no Kekkon)
- Genre: Fantasy; Yuri
- Manga
- Written by: Studio Headline
- Published by: Kadokawa Shoten
- English publisher: NA: Yen Press
- Magazine: Comic Newtype
- Original run: February 12, 2021 – June 9, 2023
- Volumes: 3

The Witches’ Marriage (Japanese: 魔女ノ結婚, Hepburn: Majo no Kekkon) is a Japanese yuri manga written and illustrated by Studio Headline. It was serialized in Kadokawa Shoten's Comic Newtype from February 12, 2021, to June 9, 2023, and was licensed for an English-language release by Yen Press in 2023. The series follows Melissa and Tanya, two witches who seek to gain enough magical power to open the door of truth.

== Synopsis ==
In order to open the "Door of Truth", the ultimate goal for any witch, Melissa decides to form a witches marriage with Tanya, a naive apprentice, so that she can gain the power she needs. Fully intending to ditch her partner once she reaches the Door of Truth, Melissa begins to second guess her plan as she is charmed by Tanya's enthusiasm to learn magic from her.

== Media ==
=== Manga ===
Written and illustrated by Studio Headline, The Witches’ Marriage was serialized in Kadokawa Shoten's Comic Newtype website from February 12, 2021, to June 9, 2023. The series was collected in three tankōbon volumes as of July 2023.

The series is licensed for an English release in North America by Yen Press.

No.	Original release date	Original ISBN	English release date	English ISBN
1	November 9, 2021	978-4041120316	September 5, 2023	9781975360399
2	August 10, 2022	978-4041127711	December 12, 2023	9781975370244
3	July 10, 2023	978-4041140369	June 18, 2024	9781975391416

=== Other ===
On November 9, 2021, Kadokawa released a comic reading of the first chapter, featuring Rinke Mabuchi as Melissa, Eriko Nakamura as Tanya and Miho Kumagai as the narration.

== Reception ==
In Anime News Network's Fall 2023 Manga Guide Rebecca Silverman gave volume 1 of The Witches’ Marriage 3 out 5, summarising "like many a first volume, this gets better as it goes on, and everyone gets a feel for what the story is (as opposed to what they might have thought it was going to be), and while it isn't the best yuri out there, it's worth a look if you're a genre fan." While MrAJCosplay gave the first volume a 2.5 out of 5, noting that "this one is a little tricky to review because it's a classic example of “what you see is what you get [...] It's a good book for a smile on a quiet afternoon in the bookstore, but that's about it.”

Erica Friedman of Yuricon noted in her review of volume 1 that "this is not generally my kind of story. I found Melissa’s treatment of Tanya intolerable. I also found the ane-loli art style objectionable. Nonetheless, but the end of the volume I, like Melissa, had come around to it. Even though it felt mostly undeserved, the end of the volume was surprisingly satisfying."
