= Kiss the Scars of the Girls =

Japanese yuri manga series

- English volume 1 cover

少女たちの痕にくちづけを (Shōjo-tachi no Kizuato ni Kuchizuke o)
- Genre: Drama; Fantasy; Yuri
- Manga
- Written by: Aya Haruhana
- Published by: Kadokawa Shoten
- English publisher: NA: Yen Press
- Magazine: Comic Newtype
- Original run: December 21, 2021 – June 13, 2023
- Volumes: 3

Kiss the Scars of the Girls (Japanese: 少女たちの痕にくちづけを, Hepburn: Shōjo-tachi no Kizuato ni Kuchizuke o) is a Japanese yuri manga series written and illustrated by Aya Haruhana. It has been serialized in Kadokawa Shoten's Comic Newtype from December 2021 to June 2023. It was licensed for an English-language release by Yen Press.

== Synopsis ==
Emille, a young vampire, is assigned a "Big Sister" on her fourteenth birthday to teach her survival skills. The relationship between Emille and her sister is cultivated through learning how to hunt and feed on humans. However, Emille wonders if her relationship can evolve into something more.

== Publication ==
Written and illustrated by Aya Haruhana, Kiss the Scars of the Girls was serializated on Kadokawa Shoten's Comic Newtype manga website from December 21, 2021, to June 13, 2023. The series was collected in three tankōbon volumes. The series is licensed for an English release in North America by Yen Press.

No.	Original release date	Original ISBN	English release date	English ISBN
1	June 10, 2022	978-4-04-811177-5	November 21, 2023	978-1-97-537049-7
2	December 9, 2022	978-4-04-113249-4	April 16, 2024	978-1-97-537681-9
3	July 10, 2023	978-4-04-113966-0	July 23, 2024	978-1-97-539268-0

== Reception ==
The series has received generally positive reviews. Anime News Network gave the first volume of Kiss the Scars of the Girls an overall B+ rating, summarizing that it was an unlikely combination of genres that worked well; "with its combination of a dark story and yearning romance, this is an exciting treat for Class S yuri fans and one worth checking out for all yuri readers." Adam Symchuk of asianmoviepulse.com wrote of the series "the work here seems aimed at a very particular niche of fandom. Still, those who love a mix of kawaii, goth, and cutesy romance will be perfectly pleased with the approach Aya Haruhana takes"
