= 12 Dirty Deeds to Unite the Princess and Her Heroine =

Japanese manga series

- First tankōbon volume cover

姫と女勇者が結ばれるための12の聖行為 (Hime to Onna Yūsha ga Musubareru Tame no 12 no Seikōi)
- Genre: Action; Fantasy comedy; Yuri
- Manga
- Written by: Moridam
- Published by: Houbunsha
- English publisher: NA: Seven Seas Entertainment
- Imprint: Fuz Comics
- Magazine: Comic Fuz
- Original run: July 5, 2021 – November 13, 2023
- Volumes: 3
- icon

12 Dirty Deeds to Unite the Princess and Her Heroine (Note: Japanese: 姫と女勇者が結ばれるための12の聖行為, Hepburn: Hime to Onna Yūsha ga Musubareru Tame no 12 no Seikōi) is a Japanese manga series written and illustrated by Moridam. It was serialized on Hobunsha's digital platform Comic Fuz from July 2021 to November 2023, with its chapters collected in three tankōbon volumes. It has been licensed for English release in North America by Seven Seas Entertainment.

== Plot ==
Princess Sephiria (セフィリア, Sefiria) and warrior Lenaria (レナリア, Renaria), childhood friends bound by promise, reunite after Lenaria defeats the Demon King. Instead of a traditional reward, Lenaria requests Sephiria's undergarments, revealing she suffers from a curse that transforms her into an erotic magazine unless she performs lewd acts. The two embark on a journey to lift the curse, but their progress is interrupted by attacks from the Demon King's sister, forcing them to employ increasingly intimate solutions to survive each encounter.

A new threat emerges when Clematis (クレマチス, Kuremachisu), another former associate of the Demon King, seeks to reshape the world according to her ideals. During this conflict, a mysterious Black Knight attacks Lenaria's group. The final confrontation resolves both Lenaria's curse and the larger threat posed by Clematis.

== Publication ==
Written and illustrated by Moridam, 12 Dirty Deeds to Unite the Princess and Her Heroine was serialized on Hobunsha's digital platform Comic Fuz from July 5, 2021, to November 13, 2023. Hobunsha collected its chapters in three tankōbon volumes, released from March 1, 2022, to December 1, 2023.

In North America, the manga was licensed for English release by Seven Seas Entertainment and published under its Ghost Ship mature manga imprint.

=== Volumes ===
No.	Original release date	Original ISBN	English release date	English ISBN
1	March 1, 2022	978-4-8322-3900-5	March 25, 2025	979-8-89373-126-2
2	December 26, 2022	978-4-8322-3964-7	July 22, 2025	979-8-89373-127-9
3	December 1, 2023	978-4-8322-0347-1	December 30, 2025	979-8-89373-590-1

== Reception ==
Reviewing the series for Anime News Network, Christopher Farris described it as an absurdist adult comedy that embraces its ridiculous premise, featuring exaggerated sexual humor and fantasy elements. While praising its energetic art and screwball approach to lesbian-themed content, he noted the plot's incoherence and overly busy visual presentation. MrAJCosplay acknowledged the manga's initial comedic potential in its serious treatment of absurd situations, but criticized its repetitive jokes and diminishing returns as the story progressed. Both reviewers found fault with the artwork's excessive use of screentones and confusing layouts, though Farris maintained the series had enough humor to appeal to its target audience despite its flaws.
