= A Witch's Love at the End of the World =

Japanese manga

- Series cover art

世界の終わりと魔女の恋 (Sekai no Owari to Majo no Koi)
- Genre: Fantasy, yuri
- Manga
- Written by: Kujira
- Published by: Kadokawa
- English publisher: NA: Yen Press
- Magazine: Comic It and ComicWalker
- Original run: October 25, 2018 – 2020
- Volumes: 3
- icon

A Witch's Love at the End of the World (Japanese: 世界の終わりと魔女の恋, Hepburn: Sekai no Owari to Majo no Koi) is a Japanese yuri manga written and illustrated by Kujira. It was serialized in Kadokawa Corporation's Comic It web magazine from October 2018 to 2020. It was collected into three tankōbon volumes.

== Plot ==
Alice, a magical prodigy, attends a secret school for witches. Her mysterious academy trains young witches with the aim to use their magic against those who used witches only as tools. Alice has lived her life by this goal but soon finds there may be more outside the academy's rule when Mari, a magic-less human, enters the school.

== Publication ==
Written and illustrated by Kujira, A Witch's Love at the End of the World was serialized in Kadokawa Corporation's Comic It manga magazine from October 25, 2018, to 2020. It is licensed for an English-language release by Yen Press.

No.	Original release date	Original ISBN	English release date	English ISBN
1	April 15, 2019	978-4-04-912354-8	November 17, 2020	978-1-97-531803-1
2	December 13, 2019	978-4-04-912762-1	February 23, 2021	978-1-97-531805-5
3	October 15, 2020	978-4-04-913400-1	June 1, 2021	978-1-97-532559-6

== Reception ==
Anime News Network gave the first volume an overall C grade, noting that the conflict that Alice should not fall in love, because it will cause her to lose her magic "feels more like a shortcut to the girls' relationship than an actual plot device." Anime UK News felt similarly, summarising that "A Witch's Love at the End of the World has the right ingredients for a magical yuri love spell, but overall, it's a quick but disappointing read."
