= A Yuri Love Story That Begins with Getting Dumped in a Dream =

Japanese manga series

- First tankōbon volume cover

夢でフラれてはじまる百合 (Yume de Furarete Hajimaru Yuri)
- Genre: Romantic comedy; Yuri
- Manga
- Written by: Hijiki
- Published by: Takeshobo
- English publisher: NA: Seven Seas Entertainment
- Imprint: Bamboo Comics
- Magazine: Web Comic Gamma Plus
- Original run: April 22, 2022 – present
- Volumes: 4
- icon

A Yuri Love Story That Begins with Getting Dumped in a Dream (夢でフラれてはじまる百合, Yume de Furarete Hajimaru Yuri) is a Japanese yuri manga series written and illustrated by Hijiki. It originally began as a webcomic published on the author's Twitter account in July 2021. It was later acquired by Takeshobo which began serializing it on its Web Comic Gamma Plus website in April 2022.

== Plot ==
Tsukushi is a teenage girl who values her deep friendship with her childhood friend Hinoka. After Tsukushi has a dream where she confesses romantic feelings to Hinoka that the latter rejects, Tsukushi begins wondering if she might be in love with Hinoka, unaware that Hinoka has romantic feelings for her.

== Publication ==
Written and illustrated by Hijiki, A Yuri Love Story That Begins with Getting Dumped in a Dream began as a webcomic published on the author's Twitter account on July 20, 2021. It was later acquired by Takeshobo which began serializing it on its Web Comic Gamma Plus website on April 22, 2022. Four volumes have been released as of June 6, 2026.

On February 12, 2025, Seven Seas Entertainment announced that they had licensed the series for English publication beginning in January 2026.

No.	Original release date	Original ISBN	North American release date	North American ISBN
1	December 15, 2022	978-4-8019-7924-6	January 13, 2026	979-8-89561-535-5
Chapter 1: "Beginnings"; Chapter 2: "Confirmation"; Chapter 3: "A Kiss"; Chapter 4: "Holding Hands"; Chapter 5: "A Dream of Touch"; Chapter 6: "Sleepover"; Chapter 7: "Sorry"; Chapter 8: "Best Friends"; Chapter 9: "Their Time Together"; Chapter 10: "Chair"; Chapter 11: "Lock Screen"; Chapter 12: "Well-Matched"; Chapter 13: "Not Yet"; Bonus: "Chapter 11 Side Story: Hinoka's Selfie"
2	September 14, 2023	978-4-8019-8162-1	May 12, 2026	979-8-89561-536-2
Chapter 14: "Let's Begin"; Chapter 15: "Love Consultation"; Chapter 16: "What Happened After "Not Yet""; Chapter 17: "Imagination Training"; Chapter 18: "Walking to School"; Chapter 19: "We Need to Talk"; Chapter 20: "Sara and Yuu"; Chapter 21: "All Four Together"; Chapter 22: "The Sugiyama Sisters"; Chapter 23: "Concealing Embarrassment"; Chapter 24: "Picking Out Swimsuits"; Chapter 25: "I Went Too Far"; Chapter 26: "The Sea Awaits"; Bonus: "Chapter 26 Side Story: Memory of the Past"
3	May 16, 2024	978-4-8019-8316-8	September 15, 2026	979-8-89561-537-9
Chapter 27: "Dumped"; Chapter 28: "Lunch"; Chapter 29: "It's the Ocean!"; Chapter 30: "Putting on a Swimsuit"; Chapter 31: "I Wanna See!"; Chapter 32: "Be Brave"; Chapter 33: "Time for a Walk"; Chapter 34: "Confession"; Chapter 35: "Success? Failure?"; Chapter 36: "The Pair Started with Getting Dumped in a Dream"; Chapter 37: "Breakfast"; Chapter 38: "Debriefing"; Chapter 39: "Making Plans"; Bonus: "Hinoka's Loungewear"
4	June 6, 2026	978-4-8019-8994-8	—	—
