= When the Villainess Seduces the Main Heroine =

Japanese manga series

- First tankōbon volume cover

悪役令嬢が正ヒロインを口説き落とす話。 (Akuyaku Reijou ga Sei Heroine o Kudoki Otosu Hanashi.)
- Genre: Romantic comedy; Yuri
- Manga
- Written by: Kasai Fujii
- Published by: Enterbrain
- English publisher: NA: Yen Press
- Original run: October 2, 2021 – present
- Volumes: 2

When the Villainess Seduces the Main Heroine (Japanese: 悪役令嬢が正ヒロインを口説き落とす話。, Hepburn: Akuyaku Reijou ga Sei Heroine o Kudoki Otosu Hanashi.) is a Japanese yuri manga written and illustrated by Kasai Fujii. It was first self-published on Kasai Fujii's Pixiv account starting in October 2021 and was collected into tankōbon volumes by Enterbrain from 2022. It was licensed for an English-language release by Yen Press in 2024.

== Synopsis ==
When the crown prince making a shocking announcement that he is breaking off his engagement his fiancée, Akuya, she decided to flip the script and steal away the commoner Sei whom her fiancée was planning to leave her for. Thus begins Akuya and Sei's new daily life as lovers.

== Publication ==
Written and illustrated by Kasai Fujii, When the Villainess Seduces the Main Heroine, was first self-published on Kasai Fujii's Pixiv account starting on October 2, 2021 The series has been collected in two tankōbon volumes by Enterbrain as of August 2023.

The series is licensed for an English release in North America by Yen Press.

No.	Original release date	Original ISBN	English release date	English ISBN
1	September 12, 2022	978-4-04-737155-2	September 17, 2024	978-1-9753-8918-5
2	July 12, 2023	978-4-04-737560-4	January 21, 2025	979-8-8554-0694-8

== Reception ==
Erica Friedman of Yuricon noted in her review of volume 1 that "it did not hold together, but as a series of doujinshi-like shorts, it definitely had it's [sic] moments", while also commenting that "I was hoping that this would be a little more fully formed than a series of short gags, but it definitely made for another perspective on the lesbian villainess trend."
