= Run Away with Me, Girl =

Japanese yuri manga

- First tankōbon volume cover

かけおちガール (Kakeochi Gāru)
- Genre: Romance, yuri
- Manga
- Written by: Battan
- Published by: Kodansha
- English publisher: NA: Kodansha USA
- Magazine: Hatsu Kiss
- Original run: October 25, 2018 – February 25, 2020
- Volumes: 3
- icon

Run Away with Me, Girl (Japanese: かけおちガール, Hepburn: Kakeochi Gāru) is a Japanese yuri manga written and illustrated by Battan. It was serialized in Kodansha's Hatsu Kiss from October 2018 to February 2020. It is licensed for English release by Kodansha USA.

== Synopsis ==
Graduate student Makimura Momo cannot forget Midori, the girl she dated in her all-girls school days. Their relationship abruptly ended on their high school graduation day when Midori told her they were now "too old to be fooling around dating girls". When a chance meeting reunites the pair, Makimura realizes her feelings for Midori have not changed, which is made more complicated when Midori invites Makimura to her upcoming wedding.

== Publication ==
Written and illustrated by Battan, Run Away with Me, Girl was serialized in Kodansha's Hatsu Kiss from October 25, 2018, to February 25, 2020. Kodansha collected its chapters into four volumes digitally and three volumes in print.

The series has been licensed for English release in North America by Kodansha USA.

No.	Original release date	Original ISBN	English release date	English ISBN
1	June 11, 2021	978-4-06-523872-1	December 20, 2022	978-1-64651-500-4
2	September 13, 2021	978-4-06-525747-0	February 21, 2023	978-1-64651-622-3
3	December 13, 2021	978-4-06-525968-9	May 2, 2023	978-1-64651-718-3

== Reception ==
Anime News Network gave the first volume and overall B+, with Rebecca Silverman praising Battan's work on the old trope seen in yuri manga where girls date during high school before breaking up to "graduate into the world of men." Silverman stated that the series was a "much more grounded yuri story than we often get, [and] events do a good job of explaining why characters act the way they do without excusing any of it."

Demelza from Anime UK News gave the final volume 8/10, noting that "there's an emotional weight to it that might be too much for some readers who are hoping for a carefree and happy romance, but if you're okay with something heavier then this ticks all the boxes. It rewards the time you put into it in a way that not all series do."
