= Strawberry Fields Once Again =

Japanese manga series

- First tankōbon volume cover

ストロベリー・フィールズをもう一度 (Strawberry Fields o Mou Ichido)
- Genre: Romance; Slice of Life; Yuri
- Manga
- Written by: Kazura Kinosaki
- Published by: ASCII Media Works
- English publisher: NA: Yen Press
- Magazine: @vitamin
- Original run: March 23, 2017 – June 23, 2019
- Volumes: 3

Strawberry Fields Once Again (ストロベリー・フィールズをもう一度, Strawberry Fields o Mou Ichido) is a Japanese yuri manga series written and illustrated by Kazura Kinosaki. The manga was serialized in ASCII Media Works's web magazine @vitamin from March 2017 to June 2019.

The story follows Kouno Akira as she encounters Sakurasaka Pure, her yet to be fiancé who travels back in time to meet her.

== Plot ==
Kouno Akira, class president and otome game fan, has opted to avoid 3D love, only to meet Sakurasaka Pure, a time traveller who informs her that in her time, she and Akira are engaged. Not only that, but Pure transfers to her class and follows her about until Akira runs away, assuring her she has no intention of engaging in 3D love. Undeterred, Pure continues to try getting closer to Akira so that she can fulfil a promise made to her future fiancé.

== Publication ==
Written and illustrated by Kazura Kinosaki, Strawberry Fields Once Again, was serialized in ASCII Media Works's web magazine @vitamin from March 23, 2017, to June 23, 2019. The series was collected in three tankōbon volumes from October 2017 to August 2019.

The series is licensed for an English release in North America by Yen Press.

| No. | Original release date | Original ISBN | English release date | English ISBN |
|---|---|---|---|---|
| 1 | October 27, 2017 | 978-4-04-893383-4 | December 15, 2020 | 978-1-9753-1922-9 |
| 2 | August 27, 2018 | 978-4-04-912015-8 | March 30, 2021 | 978-1-9753-2090-4 |
| 3 | August 26, 2019 | 978-4-04-912698-3 | June 29, 2021 | 978-1-9753-2092-8 |

== Reception ==
In Anime News Network's Fall 2020 Manga Guide, Rebecca Silverman gave the first volume a 3 out of 5 rating, noting that while it did not balance the plot well, she still considered it intriguing and worth a continued reading. Caitlin Moore gave it a 4 out of 5 rating praising the first volume for showing "a level of emotional depth that surprised me." Erica Friedman of Yuricon remarked in her review of the finale volume that "the main weakness of the story was characters, it was very hard to actually like anyone until after you understood the whole picture and by then, it was too late for about half of them."
