= Rainbows After Storms =

Japanese manga series

- Cover of the first tankōbon volume

はなにあらし (Hana ni Arashi)
- Genre: Yuri
- Manga
- Written by: Ruka Kobachi
- Published by: Shogakukan
- English publisher: NA: Viz Media
- Imprint: Shōnen Sunday Comics Special
- Magazine: Sunday Webry
- Original run: November 24, 2017 – August 18, 2023
- Volumes: 13
- icon

Rainbows After Storms (Japanese: はなにあらし, Hepburn: Hana ni Arashi; lit. 'Flower Storm') is a Japanese manga series written and illustrated by Ruka Kobachi. It was serialized on Shogakukan's online platform Sunday Webry from November 2017 to August 2023, with its chapters collected in thirteen tankōbon volumes.

== Plot ==
Chidori and Nanoha, a pair of teenage students at an all-girls school who are each other's best friends and girlfriends, enjoy their everyday lives while keeping the romantic nature of their relationship a secret.

== Publication ==
Written and illustrated by Ruka Kobachi, Rainbows After Storms was serialized on Shogakukan's online platform Sunday Webry from November 24, 2017, to August 18, 2023. Shogakukan collected its chapters in thirteen tankōbon volumes, released from April 12, 2018, to September 12, 2023.

In February 2024, Viz Media announced that it had licensed the manga for English publication. The first volume was released on December 10, 2024. As of August 12, 2025, five volumes have been released.

=== Volumes ===
No.	Original release date	Original ISBN	English release date	English ISBN
1	April 12, 2018	978-4-09-128224-8	December 10, 2024	978-1-9747-4971-3
2	July 12, 2018	978-4-09-128404-4	February 18, 2025	978-1-9747-5196-9
3	November 12, 2018	978-4-09-128706-9	April 15, 2025	978-1-9747-5242-3
4	February 12, 2019	978-4-09-128857-8	June 10, 2025	978-1-9747-5504-2
5	May 10, 2019	978-4-09-129216-2	August 12, 2025	978-1-9747-5547-9
6	November 12, 2019	978-4-09-129473-9	October 14, 2025	978-1-9747-5819-7
7	May 12, 2020	978-4-09-850132-8	December 9, 2025	978-1-9747-5820-3
8	November 12, 2020	978-4-09-850317-9	February 10, 2026	978-1-9747-6209-5
9	June 11, 2021	978-4-09-850608-8	April 21, 2026	978-1-9747-6210-1
10	December 10, 2021	978-4-09-850816-7	June 16, 2026	978-1-9747-6751-9
11	June 10, 2022	978-4-09-851176-1	August 11, 2026	978-1-9747-6520-1
12	March 10, 2023	978-4-09-851779-4	October 13, 2026	978-1-9747-6542-3
13	September 12, 2023	978-4-09-852839-4	December 8, 2026	978-1-9747-6562-1
