= School Zone Girls =

Japanese manga series

- Japanese cover for Volume 1

スクールゾーン (Sukūruzōn)
- Genre: Comedy; Slice of Life; Yuri
- Manga
- Written by: Ningiyau
- Published by: Mag Garden
- English publisher: NA: Seven Seas Entertainment
- Imprint: Blade Comics Pixiv
- Magazine: MAGxiv
- Original run: April 2, 2018 – October 10, 2022 (hiatus)
- Volumes: 5

School Zone Girls (スクールゾーン, Sukūruzōn) is a Japanese yuri manga written and illustrated by Ningiyau. It is serialized online through Mag Garden's MAGxiv label on pixiv Comic from April 2, 2018, to October 10, 2022, after which the series went on hiatus. School Zone Girls follows the daily lives of two high school friends, Rei Yokoe and Kei Sugiura. It was licensed for an English-language release by Seven Seas Entertainment in 2020.

== Plot ==
Rei Yokoe and Kei Sugiura have been best friends since middle school, and they've learned the knack of causing mischief when life becomes boring. High school may be a drag, but these in-love girls know how to infuse some mayhem and comedy into their sloppy school life.

== Publication ==
Written and illustrated by Ningiyau, School Zone Girls was serialized online through Mag Garden's MAGxiv label on Pixiv from April 2, 2018, to October 10, 2022, when the series went on hiatus. The series was collected in five tankōbon volumes from August 2018 to March 2023.

The series is licensed for an English release in North America by Seven Seas Entertainment.

No.	Original release date	Original ISBN	English release date	English ISBN
1	August 17, 2018	978-4-80-000793-3	May 11, 2021	978-1-64827-416-9
2	June 10, 2019	978-4-80-000867-1	August 17, 2021	978-1-64827-437-4
3	May 9, 2020	978-4-80-000969-2	November 23, 2021	978-1-64827-455-8
4	December 9, 2021	978-4-80-001156-5	December 20, 2022	978-1-63858-213-7
5	March 10, 2023	978-4-80-001309-5	November 21, 2023	978-1-64827-455-8

== Reception ==
In 2019 and 2020 the series was nominated for Pixiv and Nippon Shuppan Hanbai, Inc's Web Manga General Election. The series was also nominated for the 2019 Next Manga Award in the web manga category.

In Anime News Network's Spring 2021 Manga Guide the series was generally received positivity, being given a 3 out of 5 rating. Silverman notes that the first volume is "a fun little comedy, and while I could see it getting grating if it went on for too long, as it stands, it's good for a laugh or two"
