= I Won't Let Mistress Suck My Blood =

Japanese manga series

- First tankōbon volume cover

ご主人様には吸わせません！ (Goshujinsama ni wa Suwasemasen!)
- Genre: Romance; Supernatural; Yuri
- Manga
- Written by: Paderapollonorio
- Published by: Takeshobo
- English publisher: NA: Seven Seas Entertainment
- Imprint: Bamboo Comics
- Magazine: Storia Dash
- Original run: December 9, 2022 – April 25, 2025
- Volumes: 4

I Won't Let Mistress Suck My Blood (ご主人様には吸わせません！, Goshujinsama ni wa Suwasemasen!) is a Japanese yuri manga series written and illustrated by Paderapollonorio. It was serialized on Takeshobo's Storia Dash manga website from December 2022 to April 2025.

== Plot ==
A young woman named Matilda Lister applies to become the maid of August Luttinson, a reclusive woman who is secretly a vampire. Matilda thinks August is beautiful, but quickly witnesses the supernatural aspects of August and her mansion. After August loses control of herself and forcibly drinks Matilda's blood, she orders Matilda to stay within the property to prevent her secret from being exposed. While Matilda intends to cure August's vampirism and soon allows August to drink her blood, August fears that she could kill Matilda.

== Publication ==
Written and illustrated by Paderapollonorio, I Won't Let Mistress Suck My Blood was serialized on Takeshobo's Storia Dash manga website from December 9, 2022, to April 25, 2025. Its chapters were compiled into four tankōbon volumes released from June 15, 2023, to June 17, 2025.

On February 12, 2025, Seven Seas Entertainment announced that they had licensed the series for English publication beginning in December 2025.

No.	Original release date	Original ISBN	North American release date	North American ISBN
1	June 15, 2023	978-4-8019-8071-6	December 2, 2025	979-8-89561-446-4
2	May 16, 2024	978-4-8019-8315-1	April 7, 2026	979-8-89561-447-1
3	September 17, 2024 (ebook)	—	August 4, 2026	979-8-89561-448-8
4	June 17, 2025 (ebook)	—	December 15, 2026	979-8-89765-739-1
