= Failed Princesses =

Japanese manga series

- Cover of the first Japanese volume

できそこないの姫君たち (Dekisokonai no Himegimi-tachi)
- Genre: Romance, Yuri
- Manga
- Written by: Ajiichi
- Published by: Takeshobo
- English publisher: NA: Seven Seas Entertainment
- Magazine: Manga Life Storia Dash
- Original run: April 6, 2018 – August 6, 2021
- Volumes: 6

Failed Princesses (Japanese: できそこないの姫君たち, Hepburn: Dekisokonai no Himegimi-tachi) is a Japanese yuri manga written and illustrated by Ajiichi. It was serialized on Takeshobo's Manga Life Storia Dash website between April 2018 and August 2021. It was collected into six tankōbon volumes. The series was licensed for an English-language release by Seven Seas Entertainment in 2019.

== Plot ==
Fujishiro Nanaki concentrates on being pretty, and is annoyed by others like Kurokawa Kanade who she considers plain. However, after finding out that her boyfriend was cheating on her, Nanaki is consoled by Kanade and their relationship begins a new development.

== Characters ==
Kurokawa Kanade
A quiet girl who is so non-confrontational that she often walks away from unkind comments said to her at school.
Fujishiro Nanaki
A popular girl who places more importances on looking cute then reaching class on time. Kanade soon becomes Nanaki's new makeover project after her boyfriend is revealed to have been cheating on her.

== Publication ==
Written and illustrated by Ajiichi, Failed Princesses was serialized on Takeshobo's Manga Life Storia Dash website from April 6, 2018, to August 6, 2021, and was collected into six tankōbon volumes. Seven Seas Entertainment licensed the series for release on print and digital platforms from May 12, 2020.

No.	Original release date	Original ISBN	English release date	English ISBN
1	December 21, 2018	978-4801964709	August 11, 2020	978-1-64505-445-0
2	June 28, 2019	978-4801966635	September 8, 2020	978-1-64505-736-9
3	January 30, 2020	978-4801968554	February 23, 2021	978-1-64505-972-1
4	August 28, 2020	978-4801970434	August 31, 2021	978-1-64827-287-5
5	March 30, 2021	978-4801972506	April 5, 2022	978-1-63858-175-8
6	September 30, 2021	978-4801974173	October 11, 2022	978-1-63858-602-9

== Reception ==
Anime News Network gave volume one an overall rating of A−, noting that "Nanaki's use of the phrase "repay you with my body" (meaning her make up and shopping skills) is loaded, with Kanade giving it a sexual connotation in her mind, but right now that's less important than the validation the girls bring to each other: that they are worthwhile people no matter what anyone else says." Erica Friedman of Yuricon praised the work, noting that "This series has a pretty standard beginning, but it definitely picks up steam as it moves along."

Failed Princesses was included on the School Library Journal's recommendation list of nine LGBTQIA+ manga for teens.
