= If We Leave on the Dot =

Japanese manga series

- First tankōbon volume cover

定時にあがれたら (Teiji ni Agaretara)
- Genre: Romance, yuri
- Manga
- Written by: Inui Ayu
- Published by: Shodensha
- English publisher: NA: Manga Planet
- Imprint: Feel Comics FC Jam
- Magazine: Manga Jam
- Original run: October 25, 2018 – September 10, 2020
- Volumes: 4
- icon

If We Leave on the Dot (定時にあがれたら, Teiji ni Agaretara) is a Japanese manga series written and illustrated by Inui Ayu. It was serialized online via Pixiv Comic and the manga mobile app Manga Jam from October 2018 to September 2020, and is licensed for an English-language release on Dai Nippon Printing's Manga Planet website.

== Synopsis ==
Yukawa and Mizuki works in different departments but become friends by chance after Yukawa accidentally leaves her keys in Mizuki's coat pocket. They soon begin to arrange meet ups by leaving sticky notes in each other's coat pockets. However, as spring comes around and need for a winter coat lessens Yukawa wonders if their new relationship will develop past passing notes and casual dinners.

== Publication ==
Written and illustrated by Inui Ayu, If We Leave on the Dot was serialized digitally on Pixiv Comic and the manga mobile app Manga Jam beginning on October 25, 2018. The chapters were later released in bound volumes by Shodensha under the Feel Comics FC Jam imprint.

The series is published in English on Dai Nippon Printing's Manga Planet website and app.

No.	Release date	ISBN
1	April 8, 2019	9784396791315
2	October 8, 2019	9784396791445
3	March 6, 2020	9784396791520
4	October 8, 2020	9784396791674

== Reception ==
Erica Friedman of Yuricon gave the series an overall positive review, while in her review of volume 1 she noted that "Teiji ni Ageretara is not the most compelling office romance I've read, in part because the characters act as if they are 14, not 24", Friedman went on to say in her review of the final volume that "it's a lovely series that gives one hope for both Jousei and Shakaijin Yuri, modeling happy, healthy relationships between people who are accepted and loved by the people around them."
