= The Whole of Humanity Has Gone Yuri Except for Me =

Japanese manga series

- First tankōbon volume cover

私以外人類全員百合 (Watashi Igai Jinrui Zenin Yuri)
- Genre: Romance; Sci-fi; Yuri
- Manga
- Written by: Hiroki Haruse
- Published by: Kadokawa Shoten
- English publisher: NA: Yen Press
- Magazine: Shōnen Ace Plus
- Original run: December 26, 2018 – June 5, 2020
- Volumes: 2

The Whole of Humanity Has Gone Yuri Except for Me (Japanese: 私以外人類全員百合, Hepburn: Watashi Igai Jinrui Zenin Yuri) is a Japanese yuri manga written and illustrated by Hiroki Haruse. It was serialized online in Kadokawa Shoten's Shōnen Ace Plus from December 2018 to June 2020, and licensed in English by Yen Press.

== Synopsis ==
The series follows Marika Urūno, a normal girl living a normal life until she one day finds herself in a parallel reality where only women exist. While trying to find a way back to her own reality, Marika enlists the help of her classmate Lily Kazami, and comes to learn about the differences in what people consider to be normal.

== Publication ==
Written and illustrated by Hiroki Haruse, The Whole of Humanity Has Gone Yuri Except for Me was serialized online in Kadokawa Shoten's Shōnen Ace Plus from December 26, 2018, to June 5, 2020. The series was collected in two tankōbon volumes.

The series was licensed for an English release in North America by Yen Press, who collected both volumes into a single omnibus.

No.	Original release date	Original ISBN	English release date	English ISBN
1	June 25, 2019	978-4041083543	July 20, 2021	9781975322489
2	June 26, 2020	978-4041090435	July 20, 2021	9781975322489

== Reception ==
Cartoon Cipher of Anime News Network gave The Whole of Humanity Has Gone Yuri Except for Me an overall B− rating, praising Hiroki Haruse's art, though noting that "while the artwork is gorgeous and the character interactions between the leads start out believable, the story is too loaded with ideas and revelations to really appreciate them." Erica Friedman of Yuricon gave the series an overall 7 out of 10, commenting that "I would say that I enjoyed and eyerolled this self-contained 2-in-1 volume in equal measure. I’m ready for “being shocked at the concept of going out on a date” to drop out of manga for anyone over 12 or so, and, as this manga ran on Kadokawa's Shounen Ace plus service, I'm willing to let it go here."
