= I Love You So Much, I Hate You =

Japanese manga series

- Cover of the Japanese bound volume

憎らしいほど愛してる (Nikurashii hodo Aishiteru)
- Genre: Romance, yuri
- Manga
- Written by: Yuni
- Published by: Enterbrain
- English publisher: NA: Yen Press
- Magazine: Comic Marche
- Original run: May 10, 2019 – July 19, 2019
- Volumes: 1

I Love You So Much, I Hate You (Japanese: 憎らしいほど愛してる, Hepburn: Nikurashii hodo Aishiteru) is a Japanese yuri manga series written and illustrated by Yuni. The series follows an affair between office worker Saori Fujimura and her boss Ayako Asano. I Love You So Much, I Hate You was published online on Enterbrain's Comic Marche, on the Pixiv Comic website, and on Kadokawa Corporation's ComicWalker website from May 10, 2019, to July 19, 2019; it was collected into a single tankōbon volume the same year. It was licensed for an English-language release by Yen Press.

== Synopsis ==
Saori Fujimura is a rising star employee in her company's planning department who has a great working relationship with her boss, Ayako Asano. One evening after assisting Saori with work that she has been struggling to finish, Ayako invites her out for drinks at a bar. After Saori drinks too much and confesses she's in love with Ayako, the two spend the night together despite Ayako being married.

== Publication ==
Written and illustrated by Yuni, I Love You So Much, I Hate You was published online on Enterbrain's Comic Marche, on the Pixiv Comic website, and on Kadokawa Corporation's ComicWalker website from May 10, 2019, to July 19, 2019. It was collected into a single tankōbon volume on July 30, 2019.

It was licensed for an English-language release by Yen Press.

No.	Original release date	Original ISBN	English release date	English ISBN
1	July 30, 2019	978-4-04-735714-3	August 18, 2020	978-1-97-531424-8

== Reception ==
Rose Bridges of Anime News Network gave I Love You So Much, I Hate You an overall A rating, noting that it was one of her new favorite yuri manga. She summarized that "the big honest feelings, clever humor, and just-right amounts of drama and sexuality come together into the perfect romantic package."

Erica Friedman of Yuricon commented that the series was a "very decent guilty pleasure read," noting that "in real life, Fujimura and Asano and their hidden-in-plain-sight affair, would probably be absolutely intolerable separately and together, but as a fiction, it all feels, well, kind of sweet…and, with an epilogue that ties the story up, satisfying."
