= Catch These Hands! =

Japanese manga series

- Cover of the English release of the first volume

私の拳をうけとめて (Watashi no Kobushi o Uketomete)
- Genre: Yuri
- Manga
- Written by: Murata
- Published by: Kadokawa Shoten
- English publisher: NA: Yen Press
- Magazine: Young Ace Up
- Original run: January 2, 2018 – October 13, 2020
- Volumes: 4

Catch These Hands! (Japanese: 私の拳をうけとめて, Hepburn: Watashi no Kobushi o Uketomete) is a yuri manga series by murata. It was serialized in Young Ace Up from January 2018 to October 2020, and is licensed and published in English by Yen Press.

== Plot ==
Ayako Takebe, a young woman in her early twenties, intends to leave behind her history as a delinquent leader in high school and reform her image. By chance she encounters her high-school rival, Kirara Soramori. Soramori reveals that she has had a long-standing crush on Takebe, and challenges her to a fight, on the condition that if she wins, she and Takebe will begin dating.

== Publication ==
In Japan, Watashi no Kobushi o Uketomete was serialized in Young Ace Up from January 2, 2018, to October 13, 2020, and was published in a total of four tankōbon volumes.

In August 2021, Yen Press announced that they had licensed the manga for publication in English, under the localized title Catch These Hands!. The first volume was released in March 2022.

=== Volume list ===
No.	Original release date	Original ISBN	English release date	English ISBN
1	September 4, 2018	9784041071533	March 22, 2022	9781975340056
2	February 4, 2019	9784041078310	June 28, 2022	9781975340155
3	December 28, 2019	9784041084939	November 22, 2022	9781975340179
4	December 4, 2020	9784041109250	April 18, 2023	9781975340193

== Reception ==
Writing for Anime News Network, Christopher Farris gave the manga's first volume a positive review, praising the art, story, and humor in contrasting the plot element of the characters' delinquent past with the romantic comedy genre. Ian Wolf of Anime UK News, by contrast, gave a mixed review, praising the "slapstick" fight scenes and the comedy in Takebe and Soramori's "social misunderstandings," but overall deemed the first volume "not that gripping". Erica Friedman praised the translation and lettering of the English release, and the character development of later volumes.
