= Monthly in the Garden with My Landlord =

Japanese yuri manga

- First tankōbon volume cover

毎月庭つき大家つき (Maitsuki Niwa-tsuki Ooya-tsuki)
- Genre: Slice of Life; Yuri
- Manga
- Written by: Yodokawa
- Published by: Kadokawa Shoten
- English publisher: NA: Yen Press
- Magazine: Comic Newtype
- Original run: June 29, 2021 – August 13, 2024
- Volumes: 5

Monthly in the Garden with My Landlord (毎月庭つき大家つき, Maitsuki Niwa-tsuki Ooya-tsuki) is a Japanese yuri manga written and illustrated by Yodokawa. It was serialized in Kadokawa Shoten's Comic Newtype from June 2021 to August 2024 and was licensed for an English-language release by Yen Press in 2023.

The series follows Suga Asako as she moves into a detached house, with a garden after a recent breakup, only to realise after the fact that the landlady will be living with her.

== Plot ==
Suga Asako, who is heartbroken after breaking up with her partner, decides she needs a fresh start and moves. Asako falls in love with a detached house that has a garden and a room she can use for her work as a manga editor and quickly agrees to rent it. However, after Asako has settled in she finds her landlady living in the attic room, having not realised in her contract that the property is "monthly, with garden, with landlady."

== Publication ==
Written and illustrated by Yodokawa, Monthly in the Garden with My Landlord was serialized in Kadokawa Shoten's Comic Newtype website from June 29, 2021, to August 13, 2024. The series was collected in five tankōbon volumes from January 2022 to October 2024.

The series is licensed for an English release in North America by Yen Press.

No.	Original release date	Original ISBN	English release date	English ISBN
1	January 26, 2022	978-4-04-112181-8	October 24, 2023	978-1-9753-6265-2
2	September 9, 2022	978-4-04-112841-1	March 19, 2024	978-1-9753-7223-1
3	March 29, 2023	978-4-04-113492-4	August 20, 2024	978-1-9753-9022-8
4	December 11, 2023	978-4-04-114362-9	March 18, 2025	979-8-8554-0680-1
5	October 10, 2024	978-4-04-115404-5	September 23, 2025	979-8-8554-2031-9

== Reception ==
In Anime News Network's Fall 2023 Manga Guide, Christopher Farris gave the first volume 3 out of 5 stars. Farris noted that volume 1 did not seem to want to fully commit to being "slice-of-life sweetness" but neither did it fully commit to harder plotlines; summarizing that "I can see this one becoming richer if it can settle in as it goes on, though as-is, it's still an entertaining, if very uneven, time." MrAJCosplay went on to also give the first volume 3 out of 5 stars, noting that "The writing is simple, but it has a lot of heart. It's nothing extraordinary, but it doesn't fail to elicit a smile with each passing chapter while also leaving little hints that there's probably a more serious revelation eventually coming down the road."

Erica Friedman of Yuricon gave the third volume an overall 8 rating, noting that "this volume was so refreshing in every way. As silly as the initial premise is, we are rooting for Miyako and Asako to find happiness ... I have said before that this kind of real-world slow life is my jam. I don't need high school drama right now (or maybe ever again,) I do need adults building relationships." Adam Symchuk of asianmoviepulse.com wrote of the series "Visually, "Monthly in the Garden with My Landlord" is wonderfully expressive in capturing the characters' emotions, great at interjecting subtle humor, and captures the comforts of home with detailed backgrounds."
