= Futaribeya: A Room for Two =

Japanese manga series

- English volume 1 cover showing Sakurako Kawawa (left) and Kasumi Yamabuki (right)

ふたりべや (Futaribeya)
- Genre: Slice of life, yuri
- Manga
- Written by: Yukiko
- Published by: Gentosha
- English publisher: NA: Tokyopop
- Magazine: Monthly Birz; Denshi Birz; Comic Boost
- Original run: July 30, 2014 – June 23, 2023
- Volumes: 10

Futaribeya: A Room for Two (Japanese: ふたりべや, Hepburn: Futaribeya), is a Japanese yuri manga series by Yukiko. It began serialization in Gentosha's seinen magazine Monthly Birz in July 2014, and later concluded on the website Comic Boost in June 2023. Tokyopop licensed Futaribeya for release in North America and began releasing it in 2018.

== Plot ==
Sakurako Kawawa is an intelligent and responsible girl about to start high school. Upon moving into a boarding house affiliated with the school, Sakurako meets her roommate Kasumi Yamabuki, a gorgeous and easygoing girl who prefers putting the least amount of effort into everything she does. The two of them quickly settle into their new life together and find that they are quite compatible with each other to the point of even sharing a bed and drinking from matching mugs.

== Characters ==
Sakurako Kawawa (川和 桜子, Kawawa Sakurako)
Main character.
Kasumi Yamabuki (山吹 かすみ, Yamabuki Kasumi)
Sakurako's roommate.
Azusa
Classmate. Lives in the dorms.
Yukari Shinano
A girl with glasses who sits next to Kasumi in class.
Natsuki Hyuuga (日向 ナツキ, Hyūga Natsuki)
19 years old. The boarding house's landlord and supervisor. Lives on the first floor.
Mizuki Hyuuga (日向 ミズキ, Hyūga Mizuki)
Natsuki's brother. Can't stand teenage girls.
Kasumi's mother
In charge of a variety of courses and experiences at a culture school. Loves shopping for clothes.

== Release ==
Futaribeya is written and illustrated by Yukiko. It originally began as a dōjinshi titled Futaribeya Yukiko distributed at the dōjinshi convention Comitia 107 on February 2, 2014, and according to Yukiko, this was the first dōjinshi she created. This dōjinshi was later included in Yukiko's short story collection Onedari Shite Mite (おねだりしてみて) released in December 2016. The series began serialization in Gentosha's Monthly Birz magazine with the September 2014 issue sold on July 30, 2014. It concluded in that magazine with the May 2015 issue sold on March 30, 2015, and was transferred to Gentosha's website Denshi Birz on April 30, 2015. Denshi Birz was later renamed Comic Boost on January 15, 2019. The series ended serialization on June 23, 2023. Ten tankōbon volumes were published between March 24, 2015, and July 24, 2023. Tokyopop licensed Futaribeya for release in North America and began releasing it in 2018.

No.	Original release date	Original ISBN	English release date	English ISBN
1	March 24, 2015	978-4-344-83384-5	October 23, 2018	978-1-427-85982-2
2	December 24, 2015	978-4-344-83583-2	November 27, 2018	978-1-427-85986-0
3	July 23, 2016	978-4-344-83755-3	March 5, 2019	978-1-427-86014-9
4	March 24, 2017	978-4-344-83944-1	May 21, 2019	978-1-427-86025-5
5	December 21, 2017	978-4-344-84116-1	July 16, 2019	978-1-427-86033-0
6	October 24, 2018	978-4-344-84322-6	November 5, 2019	978-1-427-86171-9
7	November 22, 2019	978-4-344-84559-6	November 24, 2020	978-1-427-86330-0
8	August 24, 2020	978-4-344-84693-7	July 6, 2021	978-1-427-86784-1
9	September 24, 2021	978-4-344-84693-7	August 17, 2022 (digital); December 20, 2022 (physical)	978-1-427-86923-4
10	July 24, 2023	978-4-344-85245-7	September 12, 2023	978-1-427-87348-4

== Reception ==
Comic Boost reported in November 2019 that over 210,000 physical and digital copies of the volumes have been sold in Japan.
