= LGBTQ themes in anime and manga =

Lesbian, gay, bisexual, transgender, and queer (LGBTQ) themes have featured in anime and manga since at least the 1950s, when Osamu Tezuka's manga Princess Knight began serialization. Outside Japan, anime generally refers to a specific Japanese-style of animation, but the word anime is used by the Japanese themselves to broadly describe all forms of animated media there. According to Harry Benshoff and Sean Griffin, the fluid state of animation allows the flexibility of animated characters to perform multiple roles at once. Manga genres that focus on same-sex intimacy and relationships resulted from fan work that depicted relationships between two same-sex characters. This includes characters who express their gender and sexuality outside of hetero-normative boundaries. There are also multiple sub genres that target specific consumers and themes: yaoi, yuri, shoujo-ai, shonen-ai, bara, etc. LGBT-related manga found its origins from fans who created an "alternative universe" in which they paired their favorite characters together. Many of the earliest works that contained LGBT themes were found in works by dōjinshi, specifically written content outside the regular industry. The rise of yaoi and yuri was also slowed due to censorship laws in Japan that make it extremely hard for Japanese manga artists ("mangakas") and others to create work that is LGBTQ themed. Anime that contained LGBTQ content was changed to meet international standards. However, publishing companies continued to expand their repertoire to include yuri and yaoi, and conventions were created to form a community and culture for fans of this work.

== History ==
=== Pre-1960s ===
Scholars and manga artists generally agree that Osamu Tezuka greatly influenced manga. In Tezuka's work, Princess Knight, which began in 1953, the main character fluctuates between feminine and masculine identities. Sapphire, the main character of Princess Knight, was born female but was raised as a male to prevent the antagonist, Duke Durlamin, from inheriting the throne. Yuricon founder Erica Friedman stated that Sapphire had the hearts of a boy and a girl and that her character created the "Yuri trope of the Girl Prince." Tezuka was inspired by Takarazuka Revue, a Japanese all-female musical troupe that performs both feminine and masculine roles. Osamu Tezuka grew up in Takarazuka where the troupe is based. Some, like Friedman, stated that Nobuko Yoshiya's 1919 story, Yaneura no Nishojo, also known as Two Virgins in the Attic, was one of the earliest yuri works. She argued that the story established common tropes "used in Japanese girls' literature", including in Class S fiction, and influenced anime like Cream Lemon, Strawberry Panic, and Maria Watches Over Us in later years. Friedman also points to Otome no Minato in 1938, describing it as a Class S relationship novel and "proto-yuri."

=== 1960s–today ===
Media and related materials depicting young men in same-sex relationships started to materialize in the 1970s. These stories were primarily created and consumed by adolescent girls and women reading shoujo genre tales. Over time work that focused primarily on male to male intimacy was referred to as "shonen-ai", "yaoi" and "boy's love" (BL).

In the 1960s, a group of women manga artists called the Magnificent 24 or the Year 24 Group heavily influenced the genre of shoujo manga by introducing philosophical and radical ideas, including themes focusing on gender and sexuality. The Magnificent 24 group referred to women manga artists who were born in the Year 24 Shōwa (1949) according to numerous scholars, and the exact membership is not defined. A few artists who were associated this group were Moto Hagio, Yumiko Ōshima and Keiko Takemiya. The manga artists in this period transformed the writing and drawing style within the genre, thereby creating a space for women artists in manga. The artists broadened the content of shoujo manga, adding science fiction, historical, and dramatic elements that changed how readers consumed the genre. Works from these groups contained the earliest examples of same-sex intimacy and relationships found in manga. Ryoko Yamagishi's Shiroi Heya no Futari (白い部屋のふたり) was credited as the first manga to portray a lesbian couple. Conversely, Keiko Takemiya's work, In the Sunroom (サンルームにて) is said to depict the first male-to-male kiss in shojo manga. The popularity of Year 24's works spurred interest in male-male romance narratives from the 1960s onward. Yuricon founder Erica Friedman would later say that "Shiroi Heya no Futari" was the "first" yuri manga, drawing from many conventions of same-sex romance and girls' literature created or used by Yoshiya Nobuko, and visually confied "yuri tropes," with a broad influence on other works in later years, such as Citrus.

Amateurs as well as professional manga artists shared their works in a public hall called Comic Market (コミックマーケット Komikku Māketto), a channel for distributing and sharing work outside publisher restrictions. The market primarily focused on buying and selling of doujinshi (self-published works), and in its early years some artists from the shoujo circle displayed work containing fictionalized same-sex relationships between their favorite musicians.

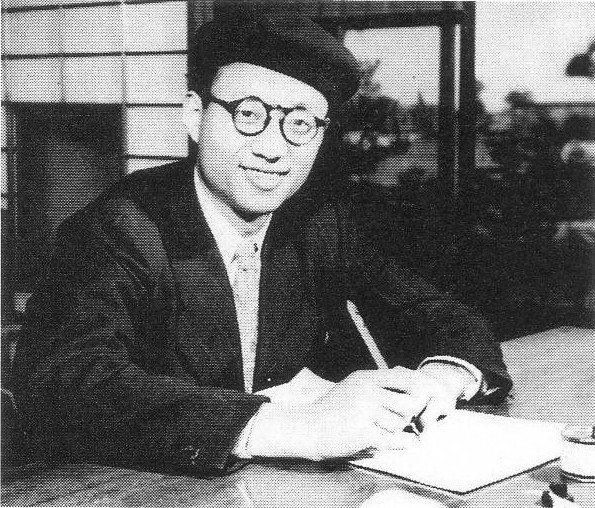
Osamu Tezuka in 1951; he was one of the directors of Cleopatra.

On September 25, 1970, Cleopatra, an anime fantasy film directed by Osamu Tezuka and Eiichi Yamamoto, was released. The film would feature various LGBTQ characters: Apollodoria, who is attracted to Cleopatra, and Octavian, who is attracted to a man named Ionius. Tezuka had previously written the Princess Knight manga, while Yamamoto had previously directed Astro Boy. Tezuka would later work on the anime based on the Princess Knight manga he had written. Later in the 1970s, Magio Moto would draw Heart of Thomas, which contained homosexual elements. This would be followed by Cutey Honey, which began as manga, with same-sex symbolism morphing into "sexually suggestive signals" with a female warrior who does not need men, and creating a "lesbian love story" that evolved and "survived over decades."

From September 1979 to September 1980, Rose of Versailles, directed by Tadao Nagahama (episodes 1–18), and Osamu Dezaki (episodes 19–40), aired on Nippon TV. The manga, which ran from 1972 to 1973, was famous for having the first "bed scene" in manga that was depicted by a woman, which has had a "profound impact" on female readers, including fan criticism of the adaptation of this scene to the anime. Yukari Fujimoto has said that "for us junior and senior high school girls at that time, our concept of sex was fixed by that manga". The anime series earned high popularity on Japanese television and later in other parts of the world. Influenced by Princess Knight, which aired on Fuji TV from 1967 to 1968, In the anime, Princess Sapphire, would be introduced as a genderqueer character. She would be raised as a boy by their father since women are not eligible to inherit the throne, but would be born with both a male and female heart, and later fall in love with and marry Prince Frank. CBR would praise the anime for achieving the "cinematic extravagance and form that the lavish former Queen of France would approve of." This anime would also influence Revolutionary Girl Utena and Sailor Moon as noted by Yuricon founder Erica Friedman.

In the 1980s the term yaoi was primarily used to describe homoerotic works. The word is a shortening of "yama nashi ochi nashi imi nashi," or "no climax, no ending, no meaning" and was primarily focused on male-to-male relationships between two favorite characters. It is now an umbrella term in Japan that describes male to male homoeroticism.

Conversely, the term yuri described Japanese works featuring female-to-female intimacy. The actual term yuri is translated to "lily" which was symbolized as spiritual beauty and sexual purity. Yuri was first used to describe female-to-female intimacy by one of Japan's first gay magazines, Barazoku. The magazine featured a regular column called Yurizoku no heya (Room for the lily tribe) to address lesbian readership. Within the artist circles, the term Yurizoku was shortened to yuri to describe female to female intimacy. One series in the 1980s which featured yuri themes was a manga named Paros no Ken, focusing on a girl prince character who rejects romantic advances by men and loves a serving girl named Fiona, and explores same-sex relationships between women as a result.

In 1995, Rica 'tte Kanji!?, a Japanese yuri manga series, written and illustrated by Rica Takashima, was first serialized in the manga magazine Phryne, then in Anise in 1996, and licensed for English release by ALC Publishing, with the first volume released in June 2003. Takashima told Yuricon founder Erica Friedman that it was "lesbian-themed," while Friedman described the series as "a story about a young lesbian's life", it was her first publishing job, she made a lot of mistakes, and noted that the series also covers lesbian bar culture in Japan too. (Note: more about this interview on pages 122, 125-130) She also said in another interview that she created the series to have a yuri manga that was happy and about everyday life, unlike most yuri of the time, which typically ended in tragedy or were in a sci-fi setting.

During the 1990s, there would be series with predatory and possessive lesbians, like in the manga Futtemo Harettemo, and those with characters which were either bisexual or pansexual like Angel Sanctuary. Friedman also asserted that the boy's love market in the U.S. was built upon series like Gravitation, which began with fan subtitling. In 1991, the OVA series of Bubblegum Crisis would end, with her motorcycle serving as a symbol, in part, of how "she bonds with another woman."

In the late 1990s, the light novel series, Maria Watches Over Us would begin. It has later iteractions over the years, with light novel and manga series, an anime adaptation from 2003 to 2009, and live-action film. Although the popular series has roots in Class S, is genre-defining, and an enclosed "women's world," yuri expert Erica Friedman noted it is only "yuri-ish" with the protagonists only in relationships with platonic romance. Even so, this series was said to introduce an "entire generation of global yuri fans" to specific sisterly bonds between women, and influenced series with some similar themes such as Strawberry Panic! and Kannazuki no Miko. Friedman would describe Strawberry Panic!, which began as a light novel, then a manga, with anime and video game adaptations in the 2000s, as aimed at male audiences, with yuri stereotypes, and a "yuri parody" made for the male gaze, leading to an influence of fans looking for fan service in their yuri stories. She would further describe Kannazuki no Miko as "insanely popular" but based upon a comic made for men "that used Yuri as a fetish" while outwardly yuri and note that Pieta, which ran from 1998 to 199, would not depict a yuri relationship as stable or whole.

In Azumanga Daioh: The Animation premiered in April 2002. A storyboarder and episode director for Cardcaptor Sakura, Shigehito Takayanagi, would later be a storyboarder for the series. The series would feature Kaorin, who is implied to be a closeted lesbian. (Note: In Azumanga Daioh: Supplementary Lessons Chapter 3 Page 12, Osaka asks Kaorin whether she is gay, to which she responds "The correct term is Lesbian!" before denying that she is a lesbian.) Erica Friedman would later describe Kaorin as a "side character with an unrequited and unstated crush on a character of the same sex.". Takayanagi would also later direct Kanamemo. The latter series would have strong yuri overtones, and would be described as a romance between two openly lesbian protagonists: Yuuki Minami and Yume Kitaoka. In the 2000s, additional series with yuri themes included Simoun, an original anime which was later adapted into a manga series and a light novel, and said to bt the first anime which was marketed as yuri in North America. This contrasted manga such as Hatsukoi Shimai with seductive teasing, or My-HiME with a predatory lesbian character.

In the 2010s, there would be series falling into the girl prince trope, like Maidens in the Forest of Field Rose, also known as Nobara No Mori no Otome-tachi, and others with female-dominated cast. The latter included Bodacious Space Pirates, which began as a manga, and later had adaptations for anime series, an anime film, and a light novel series, with the protagonist, Marika Kato, attending a school "in a woman's world.". While some series during this decade involve suicided by an "obsessed women" (Puella Magi Madoka Magica), a lesbian serial killer (Murcielago), incestual romance between two sisters (Citrus), or was argued to be yuri for a male audience with characters "truly in love" (Sakura Trick) others were more positive. This included iconic series such as Whispered Words, which ended its manga run in 2011, and Sweet Blue Flowers, which ended its manga run in 2013 and focused on the "interior lives of its adolescent female characters" and the yuri romance Bloom Into You, which, among other elements, depicted adult women in a stable lesbian relationship. The manga If My Favorite Pop Idol Made It to the Budokan, I Would Die, with an anime adaptation in 2020, would be, according to Friedman, sold as a "'yuri' idol series."

Additionally, a manga which ended in 2012, entitled Gunjo, had a lesbian character leaving her career, and relationship, so she can "commit a crime", and a popular yuri manga named Kase-san focuses on a romantic relationship between two women at the center, with a campaign to have an animated adaptation. Furthermore, My Brother's Husband, by a gay manga artist, Gengoroh Tagame, tackled homophobia, cultural difference, and family, departing from Tagame's other works, which focused on erotic and sadomasochistic subject material while Our Dreams at Dusk followed Tasuku Kaname, a gay teenager who meets other LGBTQ+ people at a discussion lounge after being involuntarily outed.

== Anime distribution, censorship and changes ==
The Japanese government uses censorship laws to regulate published content in the country. Article 175 of the Criminal Code (1907) prohibits the distribution, sale, or possession of materials that contain "obscene" (waisetsu) content. This included any depiction of pubic hair, adult genitalia, and sexual acts. However, manga creators developed ways to depict naked bodies and sex without showing pubic hair. Works that contained erotic content obscured character's genitals with blurring or black dots. The law was only sparingly applied and the number of creators and publishers fined were minimal. Sharon Kinsella states, "In general pornography has not been strongly compartmentalized in post-war Japan" and pornographic content has appeared throughout Japanese media and in pornographic productions. BL (Boy's Love) comics can often be found in large bookstores in Japan, and there is a large commercial market for same-sex intimacy.

In 1998, manga and anime received negative attention following the arrest of Tsutomu Miyazaki the so-called "Otaku Serial Killer." Miyazaki possessed large amounts of sexually explicit anime and was a frequent participant of Comic Market. In the aftermath of the killings thousands of doujinshis were confiscated and several shop owners were arrested.

=== Censorship in the United States ===
Anime reached the United States in the 1960s on the back of strong interest from fans and college students. Osamu Tezuka's Astro Boy (1963) and Speed Racer were the earliest anime series shown to American audiences. Accordingly, collaborations among American and Japanese companies to market titles to American consumers increased. In order to broadcast anime on American television, production companies had to cut scenes that were deemed too "violent." Plot lines and direct translations of dubbing were also modified for Western audiences.

Scholars have noted several anime that were edited specifically to fit Western sensibilities. When Sailor Moon was released in the United States, elements of the story were removed because Optimum Productions, the Canadian company in charge of the English language product, claimed that some of the content "is not suitable for children." Under standards set by the Canadian Radio-Television and Telecommunications Commission, Sailor Moon was altered to fit within those guidelines. Following are examples of material censored to fit North American requisites.

- Zoisite, a homosexual man finds himself in a homosexual relationship with Kunzite in the series. In the English dubbed version, Zoisite is made into a woman, thereby making the relationship heterosexual.
- The relationship between Sailor Uranus/Haruka Tenoh and Neptune/Michiru Kaioh was depicted as one of 'cousins' who are simply 'very close.' In the original Japanese version, they are lovers.
- Fish-Eye is changed into a woman in the English version of the anime. Scenes that highlighted Fisheye's masculinity were deleted.

When Cardcaptor Sakura broadcast in North America, many scenes featuring same-sex intimacy and/or relationships were removed or altered. Rejected material included Tomoyo's crush on Sakura and same-sex intimacy between Touya, Sakura's older brother, and Yukito.

== Mainstream anime and manga ==
=== Rose of Versailles ===
Some critics noted the themes in The Rose of Versailles manga, and anime adaptation, revolving around gender. cultural anthropologist Rachel Thorn noted that some fans disagreed with how the relationship between Oscar François de Jarjayes and Andre was translated into the anime series, and noted that the Oscar draws the romantic interest of Andre and Marie Antoinette during the manga. Danica Davidson for Anime News Network described the protagonist, Oscar as a "strong-willed gender-bending lead" and quotes scholar Susan J. Napier as saying that Oscar went on to "spawn a long line of feisty cross dressing heroines." Neil Lumbard of DVD Talk also revised the series, noting similar themes and describing the production as providing the "founding blueprint utilized for the later success of many more Shōjo anime productions." In her review of the series for THEM Anime Reviews, Jennifer Berman compared some characters to Utena Tenjou and Anthy Himemya from Revolutionary Girl Utena, noting the bond between Oscar and Marie, while Yuricon founder Erica Friedman described Oscar as a "woman also brought up as a boy."

Manga scholar Deborah Shamoon said that the friendship between Oscar and Rosalie Lamorlière is reminiscent of Class S dynamics, which depicted intense but fleeting homoerotic romantic friendships between girls, and said that while Oscar and André's relationship is "in a biological sense heterosexual, it is still configured within the story as homogender", with Oscar as a masculine woman, while André is an emasculated man. Shamoon further said that the close physical resemblance between Oscar and André echoes the aesthetics of the then-emerging boys' love (male-male romance) genre. In her book, By Your Side: The First 100 Years of Yuri Anime and Manga, Friedman described Oscar as embodying the girl prince trope, and noted that Oscar, like Sapphire in Princess Knight, was a girl raised as a boy, and attractive to other women, but her heart was eventually won over by Andre, her close male friend.

=== CLAMP ===
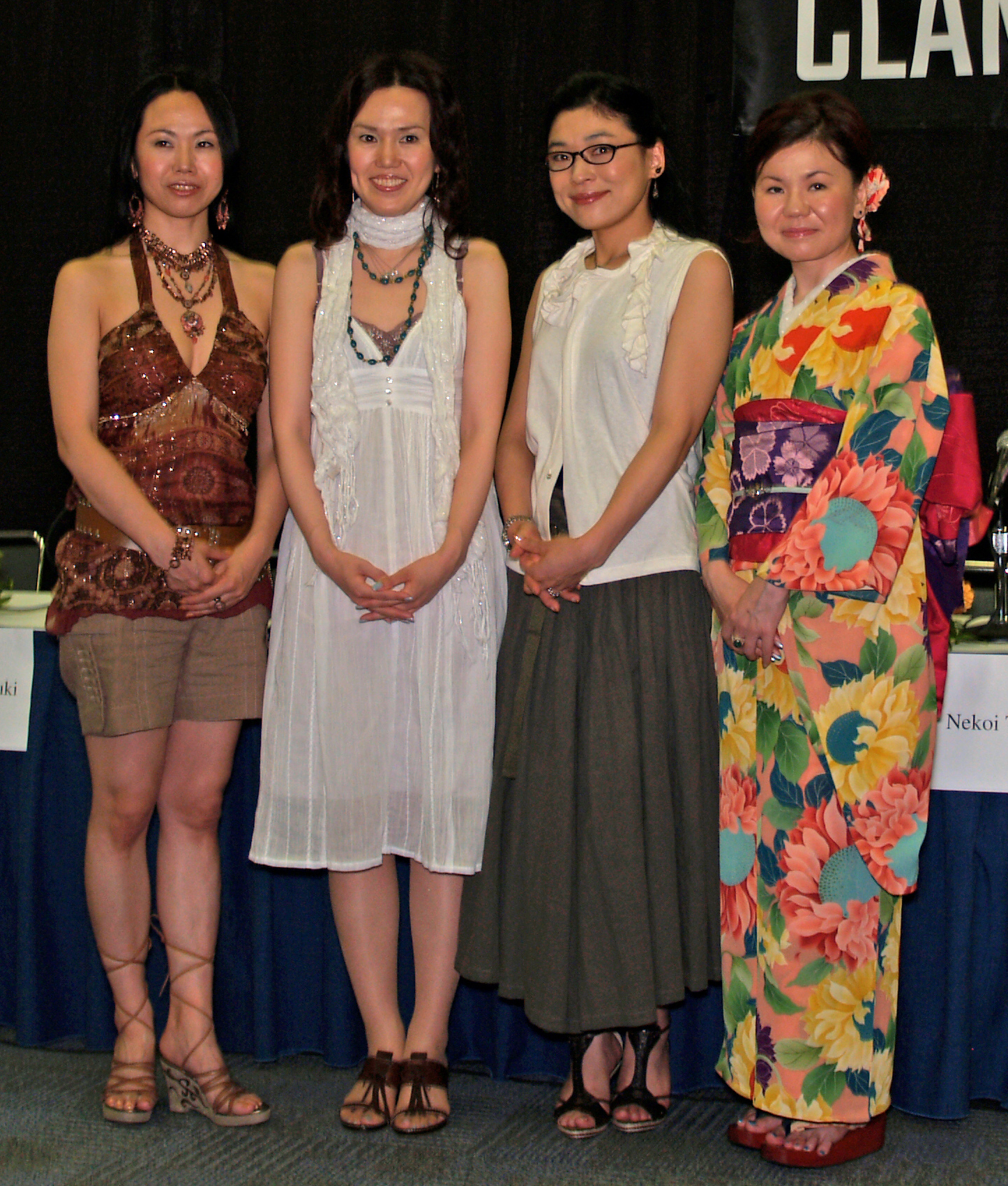
Clamp at the Anime Expo 2006

Numerous works of CLAMP, a Japanese manga artists group, explore relationships with no regard for gender or sex. Many of their manga consequently explore same-sex relationships. Works such as Miyuki-chan in Wonderland and Tokyo Babylon feature same-sex intimacy as central themes. This also includes series such as Cardcaptor Sakura. Other series, based on CLAMP manga, would also feature LGBTQ characters. For instance, a 1991 OVA, RG Veda, with a lesbian woman named Kendappa-ō and Ashura, who as born neither as a man or a woman. Additionally, two gay characters in the original manga, Subaru Sumeragi and Seishirō Sakurazuka, would appear in X anime series, based on a manga by CLAMP, which was broadcast on Wowow from 2002.

==== Cardcaptor Sakura ====
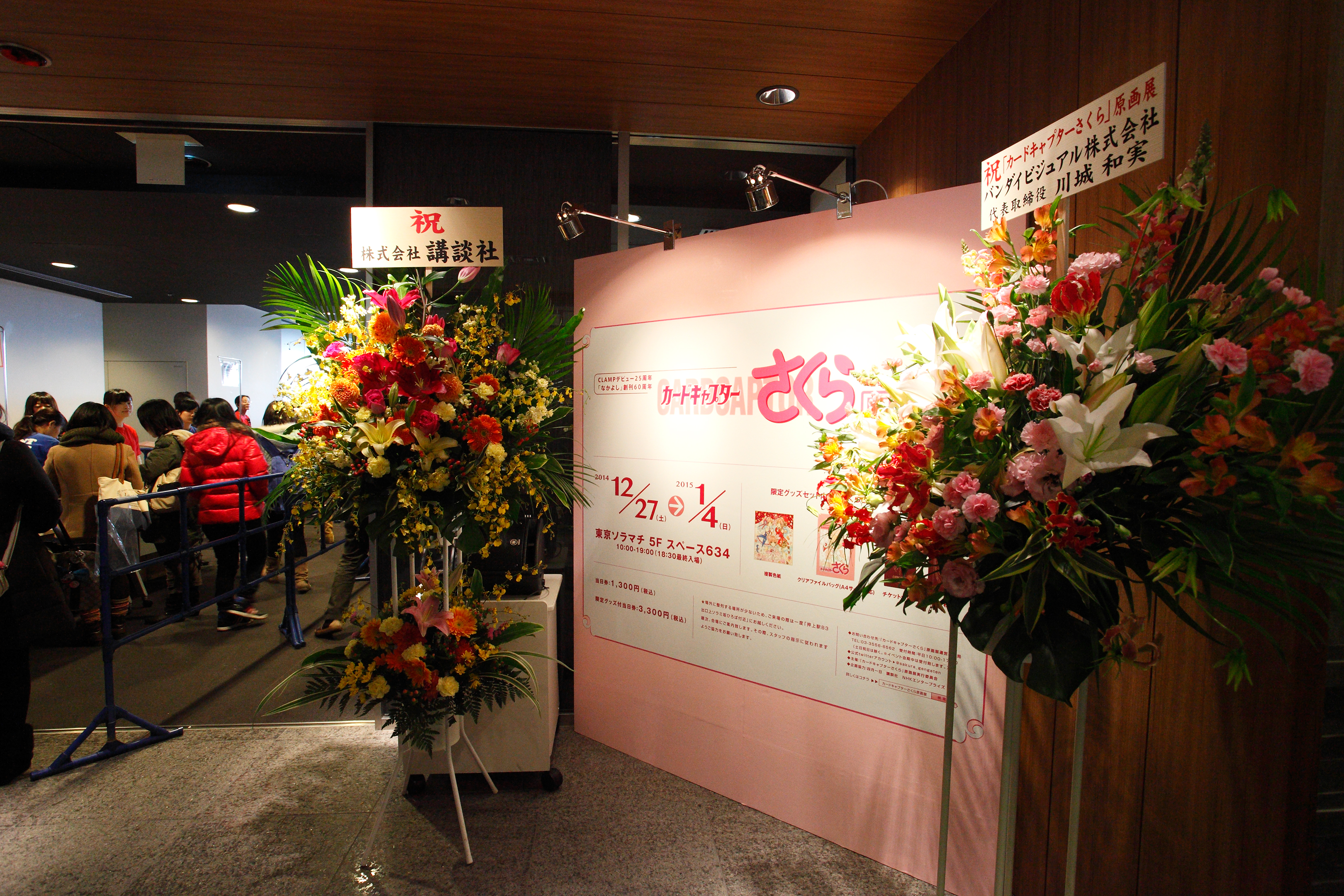
Cardcaptor Sakura Original Art Exhibition (Nakayoshi 60th Anniversary) in December 2014

In Cardcaptor Sakura, the main protagonist Sakura Kinomoto and Syaoran Li share a mutual infatuation with androgynous-looking Yukito Tsukishiro. Tomoyo Daidouji, who is best friends with Sakura, is also shown to hold sexual feelings for Sakura, even loving what she wears. However, Sakura does not return her feelings. At one point, Tomoyo confesses her love to Sakura, but Sakura misunderstands her, thinking she means "love" means she thinks of her a best friend, with Tomoyo saying that she will explain it when Sakura is older. The creators have stated that Sakura, the protagonist of this anime who has a "desire to befriend everyone she meets," and that does not see gender as barrier for her romantic attraction. Some have argued she is bisexual. Furthermore, Sakura has a crush on a female teacher and had feelings with Li, who also had feelings for her, but does not admit them. As such, some argued arguing that Syaoran is bisexual based on his sexual attractions.

Cardcaptor also depicts same-sex intimacy between Touya Kinomoto, Sakura's older brother and Yukito. In episode 65, when Yukito's health is weakening due to a weakening in Yue's power (his alter-form), Touyo decides to give up his power to save Yukito from disappearing. Yukito and Touya have been confirmed as a couple, with Yukito rejecting Sakura's feelings because he is in love with Touya. Before meeting Yukito, Touya dated Kaho Mizuki when she was his junior high school teacher, and she broke up with him later. Some argued that Touya was either bisexual or pansexual. Additionally, a recurring character, Ruby Moon has no biological sex. and is always seen presenting as female, with Moon stating that their gender does not matter because they are not actually human. At the time the series aired, networks, chopped out the "gay content" and other similar themes, in the dubbed version of the series.

Cardcaptor Sakura: Clear Card, the sequel to Cardcaptor Sakura, which is based on an ongoing manga of the same name by CLAMP, would air on NHK from January to June 2018. Some criticized the series. For instance, Geordi Demorest argued that while the original Cardcaptor Sakura is beloved for its "LGBTQ-inclusiveness," this sequel seems "less actively progressive" and is missing the original focus on "explicitly representing LGBTQ characters," criticizing the lack of character development for Tomoyo, only having a brief reference to the romance "between Sakura's brother Touya and his friend Yukito." Demorest called for the series to do more to "explore sexual orientation and the gender spectrum" of the characters and categorized the show as nostalgic while coasting on "broad characterizations" of the original cast. In contrast, Tim Jones and Stig Høgset of THEM Anime Reviews were more positive. Jones said he had some hesitation to start the series, as it was three years after Sailor Moon Crystal, and Høgset called the show like "a fun family reunion." Both noted that while the plot is typical, it is "pure feel-good fun" and Jones concluded that the series has "some of the charm" of the original series, but felt "more like a trip down memory lane than a brand-new series." Lynzee Loveridge of Anime News Network wrote that she was unsure whether the series added "anything worthwhile to characters' stories," writing that it is a "facsimile of the previous series," with no traditional villains.

Charles Solomon of Animation Scoop praised the series for its animation quality, but opined that the series "faltered" by copying the original series "too closely" and having an ending that was too abrupt. He additionally stated that elements like Tomoyo's love for Sakura, the crush of Sakura on Yuki and acceptance of him as the lover of Toya "fell by the wayside." Jack Eaton of Gamerant noted that the series did not receive "the same critical and commercial success" as the original, and called for "a second chance at a sequel" which is more fitting than this series, or a remastering of the original. Shamus Kelley, in his review of the final three episodes of the series for Den of Geek, criticized the ending as a "convoluted mess", while calling the plot "heavy-handed". He noted the series focuses on Tomoyo's "endless obsession with Sakura", and opined that the series is "really fun but fighting against itself." While reviewing volumes 1 and 2 of the manga, Erica Friedman, founder of Yuricon called the sequel "honest-to-goodness", and said that those who enjoy the original series will enjoy this manga, and said she was happy with "this kiddy ride full of pretty art and nice kids", but gave low-ratings for yuri themes in the series.

=== Sailor Moon ===
Lesbian characters are introduced halfway through the manga and series Sailor Moon, and their relationships are treated the same way as other heterosexual relationships. Haruka and Michiru, who are Sailor Uranus and Sailor Neptune, are a couple who live with each other. Naoko Takeuchi, the author, has confirmed that they are a couple. They would become one of the most iconic lesbian couples in anime, with the dubbed version on US and European television networks portraying them as cousins.

The character Haruka displays masculine characteristics and she is portrayed in the video wearing the male version of her school's uniform. She is often mistaken for a man, but she does not mind. However, Haruka becomes more feminized when she transforms into her Sailor Uranus character. Her partner, Michiru, is meant to be the more feminine of the two and they are often seen with each other. The relationship between Haruka and Michiru would be featured in two 1990s films: Sailor Moon S: The Movie (1994) and Sailor Moon Super S: The Movie (1995). Some have described the relationship between Michiru and Haruka as butch-femme. Yuricon founder Erica Friedman noted that Haruka embodied the girl prince trope, argued that the series had "incredible lesbian subtext", and asserted that the yuri market in the U.S. developed over series such as Sailor Moon.

Other than Haruka and Michiru, Zoisite and Kunzite, two powerful generals who work under Queen Beryl from the Dark Kingdom, are an openly gay couple, but only in the anime. However, in some dubs in other countries, Zoisite's gender was changed to female for his feminine appearance and to make them a heterosexual couple instead, but in other dubs, they are changed into brotherly figures because of the closeness of their relationship. The 1993 film, Sailor Moon R: The Movie would introduce Fiore, an alien who lands on Earth and met Mamoru Chiba / Tuxedo Mask when they were both children. It is strongly implied that Fiore's feelings for Mamoru are romantic. In 1995 makes his debut Fish-Eye, who's depicted in the anime as an effeminate cross-dressing man romantically interested in men as first shown in the series. He was changed into a woman in the English dub. In 1996, the genderqueer Sailor Starlights would be introduced. In the anime, the Sailor Starlights (Sailor Star Fighter, Sailor Star Maker, and Sailor Star Healer) were assigned female at birth, but transform to present as male and refer to themselves as males when not fighting, as shown in the episode, "Holy War in the Galaxy! Sailor Wars Legend." The Sailor Starlights would act like men in their civilian forms but transform into women when they battled villains. In the manga, the Starlights are female, only disguising themselves as men as civilians, and are not siblings. Seiya Kou (Sailor Star Fighter) additionally develops romantic feelings for Usagi Tsukino (Sailor Moon) in the series and manga.

Some scholars argued that the gender of the characters in Sailor Moon was irrelevant to their personalities, attitudes, or behaviors, with oft-blurring of gender characteristics, "traditional roles," and identity itself. The show gained a following among university students, spreading in popularity thanks to the Internet. The show was praised for empowering its viewers and its characters are noted to employ feminist concepts. It is a type of feminist concept where "traditional feminine ideals [are] incorporated into characters that act in traditionally male capacities". This representation came at a time that anime was beginning to establish a strong foothold in "American geek fandom," even as they still reflected the values of Japanese society. Venita Blackburn of The New York Times opined that Sailor Moon is a "transformative experience" about friendship and liberation that does not match the world's expectations of femininity, adding that its "iconic status" within the queer community was "no accident". She stated that the world of Sailor Moon is "interested in transformation, in upsetting expectations of presentation and value related to girlhood, masculinity, strength and gender roles", further adding that in Sailor Moon, the concept of transformation is "about light, magic and power hidden in the ordinariness of living", concluding that "there is nothing queerer than that".

On June 3, 2021, the two part animated film, Sailor Moon Eternal, a continuation of the Sailor Moon Crystal series, premiered on Netflix. It featured Haruka Tenoh (Sailor Uranus) and Michiru Kaioh (Sailor Neptune), two characters in a same-sex relationship. The film also featured Fish-Eye, an effeminate man who cross-dresses as a woman due to his romantic affections towards other men as well as Hawk's Eye, who is referred in non-binary terms. In the film, Fish-Eye is voiced by Shouta Aoi and Hawk's Eye is voiced by Toshiyuki Toyonaga. In 2023, Sailor Moon Cosmos, a two-part film was released to serve as the "fifth and final season" in the Sailor Moon Crystal anime series. The film features the Sailor Starlights as well as Sailor Uranus and Sailor Neptune.

=== Revolutionary Girl Utena ===
The approach to gender in the Revolutionary Girl Utena series is flexible, and according to Catherine Bailey, "The categorical definition of masculinity and femininity are limiting and unnecessary." Utena is a character who subverts assumptions about her sex. She should be "jumping" at the chance of marrying a prince, but she looks up to him as a role model. At school, she wears a quasi male uniform and competes alongside male peers in a variety of athletic activities. Yuricon founder Erica Friedman argued that sensuality and sexuality are "part and parcel" of interactions between characters in the series, and stated that the series gave viewers "a whole new set of Yuri archetypes" while re-imagining and re-defining which she called magical girl yuri.

According to Bailey, Utena does not want to "become" a prince literally, and when she claims that she wants to become a prince she is actually referring to princely qualities like courage, compassion, and strength. Jacqueline Ristola argues that the series engages with the concept of gender performativity, and "encourages its audience to abandon the ideological systems of patriarchy." Rebecca Silverman of Anime News Network would argue that Anthy and Utena function as "each other's external shadow selves," saying that the series holds a place in the history of anime for themes about sexuality and gender, communicating a message about adolescence that still resonates. The series was also described as one of the most important anime of the 1990s by ANN's Mike Toole.

The show contained many LGBTQ+ characters since Kunihiko Ikuhara, who directed many episodes of Sailor Moon and the show's second season, tried to express queer and feminist themes in the series, leading some to call the series "groundbreaking." While some believe that Ikuhara was inspired by The Rose of Versailles, he stated that the show's concepts came from Sailor Moon Super S: The Movie. The show would be a major influence on Steven Universe, Steven Universe Future, and She-Ra and the Princesses of Power.

In 1999, Ikuhara's film Adolescence of Utena, which featured all the characters of Revolutionary Girl Utena, would begin showing in theaters. The film would feature Utena and Anthy flirt and kiss, more overt than in the anime and the associated manga. A kiss was included due to a decision from Ikuhara. Like in the anime, Utena and Anthy, who are in love with each other, are both bisexual. Juri Arisugawa is explicitly in love with her female classmate, Shiori, in both the TV series and movie. She is described as "homosexual" by the creators in the DVD booklet. The commentary in the booklet indicated that Shiori also had feelings for her, but was too troubled and insecure to act on them in a healthy way. The film become popular among fans of yuri (lesbian manga and anime), and is often categorized as LGBT cinema with some critics saying the film seeks "a rejection of dominant discourses of gender and sexuality" with the joining of the masculine Utena and the feminine Anthy being "an acknowledgement of the need for an integrate psyche, regardless of gender or sexual orientation." Ikuhara would later create the openings of Nodame Cantabile and Sweet Blue Flowers which featured LGBTQ characters, while creating a series, Sarazanmai, which featured includes an iconic duo of male cops who are in love with each other.

=== Dear Brother ===
Osamu Dezaki, who directed episodes 19-40 of the Rose of Versailles, (Note: episodes 1-18 were directed by Tadao Nagahama) directed Dear Brother, which aired on NHK from 1991 to 1992. The series, described as a classic shōjo manga, included a sorority of the best at an elite school which is "relentless in their expectations." It was described by Erica Friedman as an "extraordinarily dark series" with a "pinnacle of Yuri" in the second half. Friedman also noted that this series, like Riyoko Ikeda's other manga, Claudine, features transgender or crossdressing characters. She further asserted that this series is a key work because Rei Asaka turns away from an "unhealthy relationship" with her half-sister, Fukiko Ichinomiya, and seeks "a healthier friendship," or even romance, "with her before her death".

Reviewers for Anime News Network also noted the influence of the series. They described the series as "hella gay", noted the influence on Revolutionary Girl Utena, Hana Yori Dango, and Ouran High School Host Club, and said that the series is "important in its own right." Carlos Ross of THEM Anime Reviews said that while the series is little known in the United States, it is beautifully animated, has a score of traditional Japanese music, and has a reputation for "lesbian overtones." Other scholars said that the manga, by Riyoko Ikeda, developed the gender-bending "dansō no reijin" concept, originally illustrated in The Rose of Versailles manga, which depicted a beautiful woman in "masculine" clothes. The concept later became a key element of many yuri animations and manga such as Strawberry Panic! and Sweet Blue Flowers.

=== Kashimashi: Girl Meets Girl ===
Nobuaki Nakanishi, a storyboarder and episode director of Cardcaptor Sakura, was the director, storyboarder, and episode director of Kashimashi: Girl Meets Girl. The anime focused on the conflict between "gender identity, gender performance, and sexual orientation" of the characters, with their characteristics threatening "the regulatory norms found within Western society and possibly Japanese society." Hazumu Osaragi, the series protagonist, begins the series as a boy, and is inadvertently killed due to an alien spacecraft crash-landing on them, and is resurrected, but their physical sex is changed to male, and learns how to "perform" the female gender with the help of Tomari Kurusu, a bisexual girl. She is later attracted to Kurusu and her other childhood friend, Yasuna, but does not want to be "identified based upon the traditional notions of gender," but rather as a person like anyone else. The series was positively reviewed by Erica Friedman, who argued the anime had normal ending reminiscent of something "that might have actually happened in real life."

=== Wandering Son ===
Ei Aoki's Wandering Son aired on Fuji TV from January to March 2011 as part of the station's Noitamina programming block. The anime would be praised as a "breakout show in the transgender drama genre" for its delicate art, empathetic story, and focus on characters. Others would describe it as artful and gorgeous series, with intricate characters, which fairly treats transgender identity, recognizing the challenges characters like Shuichi Nitori, Makoto "Mako" Ariga, and Yoshino Takatsuki have to face. One reviewer argued that the show showed characters like Nitori trying to wade through a "cissexist school environment." Another person pointed out that while the series as an important "piece of transgender literature within manga, anime and Japanese popular culture," Takatsuki assimilates "into a cis female identity" by the end of the anime, and asks whether the series has held back transgender fiction. They also argue that the series reinforces the gender binary. This series also included a bisexual woman (Anne Suehiro) and a trans woman (Hiroyuki Yoshida).

In March 2020, The Daily Dot published an article talking about a Gender and Anime at Anime Boston, noting that manga and anime have "a dearth of gender representation," with issues within Japanese culture itself, with crossdressing and genderqueer identity often made out to be a joke or a "trap" for the protagonist. They further argued that Hourou Musako in Wandering Son is one of the "few sensitive portrayals of transgender characters out there," with one panelist calling it the "only true transgender anime in existence" and saying listeners should be "sensitive when discussing gender identity." Yuricon founder Erica Friedman described the series as a "narrative of transgender tweens" while Carl Kimlinger of Anime News Network praised the series for its sensitive, smart, and fearless approach, including on transgender identity, saying the series was a "sprawling tale" of transgender children and those around them, "told with uncommon beauty and intelligence."

=== Yurikuma Arashi ===
In 2015, Kunihiko Ikuhara's Yurikuma Arashi aired on Tokyo MX. In the series, the main female protagonists, Kureha Tsubaki, Sumika Izumino, Ginko Yurishiro, Lulu Yurigasaki, and Yurika Hakonaka, have various sexual encounters and romantic relationships with each other, as they learn more about their connections with each other and those in the world who do not accept their feelings, deeming relationships between humans and bears as "dangerous." The manga adaptation was co-written by Ikuhara and Takayo Ikami, and illustrated by Akiko Morishima, who is known for "queer sexual exploration and unclear relationship boundaries" in her works. She handled the manga's character designs and had creative control over the two-volume series.

The series has been praised as tackling the "prejudice facing gay people in Japan" while simultaneously being a "moving tale of prejudice and fear and love" which focuses on cultural treatment of all women, especially those who are lesbians, criticizes the "idealization of female innocence and purity," and serves as a study of bigotry. Further reviews praised as a well-written drama which is densely packed with "social commentary, multivalent symbolism, and references to historical events, [and] literature," LGBT-friendly, critiquing the "harmful tropes present in some yuri fiction", a yuri anime about "love between a girl and a female bear", and exploring questions of "queer desire and societal belonging." Writers for Anime Feminist argued that the series used various elements to deliver a message "about the prejudice that queer women face," but said is problematic for using predatory animals as a metaphor "for queer sexuality", that reminds viewers how institutions "hurt women and LGBTQ+ people and drive them to hurt one another", and that the show's characters "negotiate their position within the systems of heteronormativity" while relating these themes to transphobia in real-life.

=== Fandom culture and demographics ===
==== Motivations for consuming Yaoi and Yuri anime ====
Pagliassotti conducted the first research Anglophone readers' motivations for consuming yaoi. According to her research, she found 10 distinct motivations: "Pure" love without gender focus, pro-gay attitude/ forbidden and transgressive love, identification (self-analysis), melodramatic (emotional elements), dislike for standard shōjo romances, a female-oriented romantic/erotic genre, pure escapism/lack of reality, art/ aesthetics, pure entertainment, and arousing, sexually titillating content. However, there are other motivations for consuming yaoi manga complicated by cultural and legal differences. For instance, yaoi manga is media that challenges patriarchal norms and gender binarism.

Accessibility to yaoi and yuri material is also dependent on international laws. For example, introduction of BL (Boy's Love) to the United States market was less likely to happen because depictions of male-to-male eroticism and sex would be considered contrary to children's material there.

Many yaoi readers are teenage girls or young women. Fujoshi is a term often used to describe fans of works depicting romantic relationships among men. In Japanese, the term translates to "rotten girls." Japanese women who read yaoi manga are most often heterosexual, and they consume the content for entertainment rather than for political or social reasons. Women also form the majority of yaoi readers in the West, accounting for 89% of total readership, with 55% of those falling into the 18-24 age range. Among yuri readers in the West, about 46% identify themselves as heterosexual women. Among yuri readers, there is a divide between men and women according to intended target audience.

The popularity of anime continued to rise in the 1990s, with the early 90s known as an "anime boom." At the time, huge conventions were hosted while the yuri, BL, and related genres began attracting fans outside Japan, including in Hong Kong and mainland China. At the same time was a so-called gay boom, with homosexuality becoming a "standard topic in television shows and in tabloid magazines." A devoted fan base blossomed in the West as channels such as Cartoon Network airing anime in program blocks. Although anime programs began declining after the "collapse of the bubble economy" in 1992 and an economic slump during the 1990s, anime continued to explore complex concepts. By 2010, the yaoi industry had an estimated annual value of 21.3 billion yen (over US$180 million). In the 2010s, LGBT issues became increasingly visible in Japan with an increased interest in LGBT issues across Japanese society, with the ruling Liberal Democratic Party trying to promote Japan as "LGBT friendly." This aligned with the estimated market size of 21.3 billion yen for the yaoi genre in 2010, which is aimed at young women, who are the main consumers of the content itself, even though some heterosexual men read it. By 2016, domestic market size of the Boy's Love genre had reached over $190 million,

== See also ==
- List of bisexual characters in anime
- List of gay characters in anime
- List of lesbian characters in anime
- LGBT themes in comics
- Editing of anime in distribution
- List of animated series with LGBT characters
- History of anime
- List of yaoi anime and manga
- List of yuri anime and manga
- List of yuri works
- List of anime by release date (1946–1959)
- Category:LGBTQ characters in anime and manga
- LGBTQ themes in Western animation
