= I Married My Best Friend to Shut My Parents Up =

Japanese manga series

- Cover of the Japanese bound volume, featuring Machi Morimoto (left) and Hana Agaya (right)

親がうるさいので後輩(♀)と偽装結婚してみた (Oya ga Urusai node Kōhai (♀) to Gisō Kekkon Shitemita)
- Genre: Romance, yuri
- Manga
- Written by: Kodama Naoko
- Published by: Ichijinsha
- English publisher: NA: Seven Seas Entertainment
- Imprint: Yurihime Comics
- Magazine: Comic Yuri Hime
- Original run: June 2018 – August 2018
- Volumes: 1
- icon

I Married My Best Friend to Shut My Parents Up (Japanese: 親がうるさいので後輩(♀)と偽装結婚してみた, Hepburn: Oya ga Urusai node Kōhai (♀) to Gisō Kekkon Shitemita; lit. "I Fake Married My (Female) Kōhai Because of My Annoying Parents") is a Japanese yuri manga series written and illustrated by Kodama Naoko. The series follows Machi Morimoto, a woman who enters into a same-sex sham marriage with her kōhai (junior). I Married My Best Friend to Shut My Parents Up was serialized in the manga magazine Comic Yuri Hime in 2018 and collected into a bound volume by Ichijinsha that same year, and was licensed for an English-language release by Seven Seas Entertainment in 2019.

== Synopsis ==
Machi Morimoto, an office lady in her early thirties, feels pressured by her parents to find a husband and settle down. Her friend and kōhai Hana Agaya, in need of a new apartment, suggests they move in together and enter a sham marriage by obtaining a partnership certificate. While Machi is hesitant about the arrangement – Hana is a lesbian who expressed romantic feelings for Machi in their youth, and unbeknownst to Machi, still harbors feelings for her – she agrees. Their relationship grows into a pleasant cohabitation, and as they overcome various hardships (including the homophobia of Machi's parents and the return of Hana's ex-girlfriend Ayaka), Machi begins to develop feelings for Hana. The series concludes with the couple entering into a genuine romantic relationship.

== Media ==
I Married My Best Friend to Shut My Parents Up was originally serialized in Comic Yuri Hime from June to August 2018, and collected into a bound volume by Ichijinsha. In September 2018, Seven Seas Entertainment announced that it would be publishing an English-language translation of the series, which was published in June 2019. The manga was creator Kodama Naoko's first serialized work following the conclusion of her earlier NTR: Netsuzou Trap; Naoko called the series "the first work by 'Light Kodama' in a long time", in reference to the comedic tone of I Married My Best Friend to Shut My Parents Up relative to the darker tone of NTR.

No.	Original release date	Original ISBN	English release date	English ISBN
1	July 18, 2018	978-4758078368	June 11, 2019	978-1642753288

== Reception ==
The series has received mixed to positive reviews. Reviewing the series for Otaku USA, David Estrella praised the series' romantic comedy elements but noted that readers seeking a realistic story about lesbian relationships "may find it too fluffy". Erica Friedman of Yuricon expressed a similar sentiment, stating that while the series "isn't problematic," its gag comic humor "doesn't feel like a sincere attempt to address [LGBT] issues." Rebecca Silverman of Anime News Network remarked that while the series compares favorably to Naoko's earlier NTR: Netsuzou Trap, she criticized its story for being underdeveloped.
