= By Your Side =

"By Your Side" may refer to:

== Albums ==
- By Your Side (The Black Crowes album), 1999, and the title song
- By Your Side (Breakbot album), 2012
- By Your Side (Hillsong album), 1999, and the title song

== Books ==
- By Your Side: The First 100 Years of Yuri Anime and Manga, a 2022 book by Erica Friedman

== Songs ==
- "By Your Side" (Calvin Harris song), 2021
- "By Your Side" (James Cottriall song), 2011
- "By Your Side" (Jimmy Somerville song), 1995
- "By Your Side" (Rod Wave song), 2021
- "By Your Side" (Sade song), 2000
- "By Your Side" (Squeeze song), 1985
- "By Your Side" (Tenth Avenue North song), 2008
- "By Your Side" (Tokio Hotel song), 2007
- "By Your Side" (Jonas Blue song), 2016
- "By Your Side", a 2004 song by Jadakiss from Kiss of Death
- "By Your Side", a 2007 song by Sebastian Bach from Angel Down
- "By Your Side", a 2008 song by House of Heroes from the album The End Is Not the End
- "By Your Side", a 2005 single by the Thrillseekers
- "By Your Side", a 2010 song by Lifehouse from the album Smoke & Mirrors
- "By Your Side", a 2016 single by Shakthisree Gopalan
- "Keep This Fire Burning", a 2002 song by Robyn also known as "By Your Side"
