= Works (manga) =

Japanese manga series

- Cover for the English edition
- Genre: Romance, Slice of life, Yuri
- Manga
- Written by: Eriko Tadeno
- Published by: Office MONO
- English publisher: ALC Publishing
- Magazine: Phryne; Mist
- Original run: 1995 – 1997
- Volumes: 1

Works is a Japanese yuri manga series written and illustrated by Eriko Tadeno. It was first published as individual one-shots in the Japanese manga magazines Phryné and Mist between 1995 and 1997, and later collected into a doujinshi by Office MONO. The manga was licensed by ALC Publishing for release in English.

== Publication ==
Written and illustrated by Eriko Tadeno, Works was first published as four individual one-shots in manga magazines Phryné and Mist between 1995 and 1997, before being collected into a single doujinshi by Office MONO in 1998. Works was licensed by ALC Publishing for a release in English in 2004, with a second edition featuring addition content being published in 2006.

No.	Original release date	Original ISBN	English release date	English ISBN
1	1998	—	2004; July 18, 2006	978-0975916049
1. "My Sister's Wedding" (from Phryne Mar. 1995); 2. "Pipayo and Nai's Hyper-Everyday Talk Show" (from Phryne Oct. 1995); 3. "I Like You the Way You Are" (from Mist Jan. 1997); 4. "My Sweet One" (from Mist Jan. 1998); 5. "Gentle Loving" (from Mist Jan. 1998); 6. "Happy Go Lucky"; 7. "Severe Loving" (guest artist Mizue Ai)

== Reception ==
The book was added to permanent collection of Kyoto International Manga Museum in 2011. Erica Friedman, the founder of Yuricon and translator of the English edition, noted in her review that "my obvious bias aside, I genuinely think that this, along with Yamaji Ebine and Rica Takashima's works, can be seen as genuinely lesbian Yuri – a rare and precious thing that should be spread through Yuri fandom."
