= Mikanuji =

Japanese manga artist

- Occupation: Manga artist
- Writing career
- Language: Japanese
- Period: 2014–present
- Genre: Yuri
- Notable works: Now Loading...!; Assorted Entanglements
- Website: hatakemikan.tumblr.com

Mikanuji (みかん氏) is a Japanese manga artist. Her work includes the Yuri series Assorted Entanglements, which has been discussed by reviewers for its focus on adult relationships.

== Career ==
Mikanuji made their professional debut in November 2016, with their work Now Loading...! serializing in Ichijinsha's Comic Yuri Hime, finishing in March 2017. The series was collected in one tankōbon volume in April 2017.

In June 2017, Mikanuji began serializing the work Assorted Entanglements on their Twitter and pixiv pages. The series was picked up by Kadokawa in March 2019 and collected in multiple tankōbon volumes.

Mikanuji has participated in various yuri anthologies, including Yuri Drill and Syrup: A Yuri Anthology.

== Works ==
=== Serialized Manga ===
- Now Loading...! (January 2017 - May 2017, 1 volume)
- Assorted Entanglements (不揃いの連理) (June 2017 - Present, 8 volumes)
- Senpai, Oishii desu ka? (先輩、美味しいですか？) (September 2021 - August 2023, 3 volumes)

=== Anthologies ===
- I Don't Need a Happy Ending (ハッピーエンドはいらない) (April 2021)

=== One-shots ===
- Various untitled works (from Yuri Drill (百合ドリル), March 2018)
- The Women at a Certain Company (ある会社の彼女たちのこと) (from Whenever Our Eyes Meet... A Women's Love Anthology (あの娘と目が合うたび私は 社会人百合アンソロジー), April 2018)
- Suki ni Naru nante Arienai (好きになるなんてありえない) (from Avalon ~bitter~, June 2018)
- Kaisha o Yasunda Hi no Koto (会社を休んだ日のこと) (from Anata no Soba ni Iru to Watashi wa: Shakaijin Yuri Anthology (あなたの側にいると私は 社会人百合アンソロジー), October 2018)
- Various untitled works (from Yuri Drill: Nanmon-hen (百合ドリル 難問編), February 2019)
- Untitled work (from Yuri Drill: Ōyō-hen (百合ドリル 応用編), February 2019)
- I Don't Need a Happy Ending (ハッピーエンドはいらない) (from Avalon Alter ~karma~, July 2019)
- Mitometaku wa Nai ga (認めたくはないが) (from Yuri Drill: Jiyūkenkyū-hen (百合ドリル自由研究編), January 2020)
- Hinekure Yūsha to Isshoni (捻くれ勇者と一緒に) (from Shūjū Yuri Anthology: Rhodanthe (主従百合アンソロジー Rhodanthe), February 2020)
- Ai nante Shiranai (アイなんて知らない) (from Qualia -Jealousy-, February 2020)
- Ohayō kara Oyasumi made (おはようからおやすみまで) (from Syrup PURE: One-loli Yuri Anthology (シロップ PURE おねロリ百合アンソロジー), August 2020)
