= Days of Love at Seagull Villa =

Japanese manga series

- First tankōbon volume cover

海猫荘days (Umineko Sou Days.)
- Genre: Romance; Yuri
- Manga
- Written by: Naoko Kodama
- Published by: Ichijinsha
- English publisher: NA: Seven Seas Entertainment
- Magazine: Comic Yuri Hime
- Original run: January 18, 2019 – August 18, 2020
- Volumes: 3

Days of Love at Seagull Villa (海猫荘days, Umineko Sou Days.) is a Japanese yuri manga series written and illustrated by Naoko Kodama. The manga was serialized in Ichijinsha's Comic Yuri Hime from January 2019 to August 2020 and is licensed for an English-language release by Seven Seas Entertainment.

== Plot ==
When Mayumi loses her fiancé to her only friend she leaves everything behind, running away to make fresh start as a junior high school teacher in the countryside where she does not know anyone. But when she arrives there she gets tangled up with a Rin, a brash but kind single mother who runs the boarding house Mayumi is staying at, after they end up falling into the ocean together. While the two women may not have a lot in common, they are still drawn to each other, and the relationship growing between them is deeper than either expects.

== Characters ==
Mayumi Kikuchi (菊地真 由美, Kikuchi Mayumi)
A reserved teacher. She moves from Tokyo to the countryside after a breakup.
Rin Ioki (五百木 凛, Ioki Rin)
A brash boarding house manager. She takes care of her late brother's daughter.
Touko (桐子, Touko)
Mayumi's only friend. Her pregnancy caused Mayumi's breakup.
Ashima Saitou (斉藤 阿島, Saitou Ashima)
A gloomy junior high student. She often visits Rin's house but gets bullied at school.
Sakura Koukami (鴻上 さくら, Koukami Sakura)
A popular junior high student. She belongs to a wealthy family.

== Publication ==
Written and illustrated by Naoko Kodama, Days of Love at Seagull Villa, was serialized in Ichijinsha's yuri manga magazine Comic Yuri Hime January 18, 2019, to August 18, 2020. The series was collected in three tankōbon volumes from May 2019 to September 2021.

The series is licensed for an English release in North America by Seven Seas Entertainment.

No.	Original release date	Original ISBN	English release date	English ISBN
1	May 16, 2019	9784758079266	November 24, 2020	978-1-64505-641-6
2	January 17, 2020	9784758020862	February 23, 2021	978-1-64505-962-2
3	September 29, 2020	9784758021630	August 3, 2021	978-1-64827-308-7

== Reception ==
The series has received generally positive reviews. Anime News Network gave the first volume of Days of Love at Seagull Villa an overall C+ rating, remarking that the series "feels like it may be biding its time a bit, and with the unsettling end to this book and the groundwork it lays down, this may be one of those series that gets better as it goes on." Erica Friedman of Yuricon noted in her review of volume one that "without landlady Rin's jocularity, this story could and probably would have bogged down" but was overall positive towards the series. However, by its final volume Friedman felt that the story could have been explored further "it feels like a book that could have become another deeply disturbing series, but was cut off (early? perhaps, I can't tell) and given a happy ending."
