= The Two of Them Are Pretty Much Like This =

Japanese manga series

- First tankōbon volume cover

ふたりはだいたいこんなかんじ (Futari wa Daitai Konna Kanji)
- Genre: Romance; Yuri
- Manga
- Written by: Takashi Ikeda
- Published by: Gentosha
- English publisher: NA: Seven Seas Entertainment
- Magazine: Comic Boost
- Original run: January 3, 2020 – February 25, 2022
- Volumes: 4

The Two of Them Are Pretty Much Like This (ふたりはだいたいこんなかんじ, Futari wa Daitai Konna Kanji) is a Japanese yuri manga series written and illustrated by Takashi Ikeda. The manga was serialized online via Gentosha's Comic Boost website from January 2020 to February 2022. The story follows the daily lives of Elliie Sakuma, a 30-year-old scenario writer, and Wako Inuzuka, a 20-year-old voice actress. It was licensed for an English-language release by Seven Seas Entertainment in 2021.

== Plot ==
Ellie Sakuma, a 30-year-old scenario writer, and Wako Inuzuka, a 20-year-old voice actress live together in Ellie's apartment, telling everyone around them that they are simply roommates. However the two women in love have a comfortable life, spending their days working on a deadline at a family restaurant together, building up a demo reel or simply walking home hand-in-hand.

== Publication ==
Written and illustrated by Takashi Ikeda, The Two of Them Are Pretty Much Like This, serialized online via Gentosha's Comic Boost website from January 3, 2020, to February 25, 2022. The series was collected in four tankōbon volumes from August 2020 to April 2022.

The series was licensed for an English release in North America by Seven Seas Entertainment.

=== Volume list ===
No.	Original release date	Original ISBN	English release date	English ISBN
1	August 24, 2020	978-4-34-484692-0	June 7, 2022	978-1-63858-151-2
2	February 24, 2021	978-4-34-484802-3	December 27, 2022	978-1-63858-296-0
3	August 24, 2021	978-4-34-484910-5	June 6, 2023	978-1-63858-796-5
4	April 22, 2022	978-4-34-485029-3	November 21, 2023	978-1-68579-534-4

== Reception ==
Erica Friedman of Yuricon praised the series, remarking that "This series has the same kind of wacky humor we loved in Ikeda's Whispered Words, without the melodrama or misunderstandings. This is a great story about two queer women I'd have over for lunch any time, with the occasional heartbreakingly good portraiture."

Writing for Comic Book Resources, Jonathon Greenall named The Two of Them Are Pretty Much Like This as "2022's Most Heartwarming Yuri Series", noting that "One of the most memorable things about The Two of Them Are Pretty Much Like This is how grounded it is. Sakuma and Inuzuka's lives are very regular and mundane. There is no grand adventure, and the plot has no fantastical elements." He went on to praise Ikeda's art and the stories insight into working in a creative field.
