= Assorted Entanglements =

Japanese manga series

- First tankōbon volume cover

不揃いの連理 (Fuzoroi no Renri)
- Genre: Romance; Slice of Life; Yuri
- Manga
- Written by: Mikanuji
- Published by: Kadokawa Shoten
- English publisher: NA: Yen Press
- Magazine: Comic Newtype
- Original run: June 14, 2017 – March 7, 2025
- Volumes: 10

Assorted Entanglements (Japanese: 不揃いの連理, Hepburn: Fuzoroi no Renri) is a Japanese yuri manga series written and illustrated by Mikanuji. It was first published independently on Mikanuji's Pixiv account from June 2017 to August 2020, and later began serialization in Kadokawa Shoten's Comic Newtype from November 2020 to March 2025. It is licensed for an English-language release by Yen Press.

== Synopsis ==
The series follows an assortment of connected love stories between women starting with the aftermath of Iori, a twenty-eight-year-old office worker, spending the night with a bartender she just met.

== Characters ==
Iori Tanaka (田中伊織, Tanaka Iori)
Voiced by: Mai Fuchigami (PV)
Minami (南)
Voiced by: Aina Aiba (PV)

== Publication ==
Written and illustrated by Mikanuji, Assorted Entanglements was first published independently on Mikanuji's Pixiv account from June 14, 2017, to August 29, 2020. It began serialization in Kadokawa Shoten's Comic Newtype website on November 20, 2020. It ended serialization on March 7, 2025. The series was collected into ten tankōbon volumes by Kadokawa from March 14, 2019, to June 10, 2025.

The series is licensed for an English release in North America by Yen Press.

No.	Original release date	Original ISBN	English release date	English ISBN
1	March 14, 2019	978-4-04-107997-3	February 21, 2023	978-1-9753-4886-1
2	December 9, 2019	978-4-04-108843-2	June 20, 2023	978-1-9753-4888-5
3	August 7, 2020	978-4-04-109721-2	September 19, 2023	978-1-9753-4890-8
4	April 9, 2021	978-4-04-111347-9	February 20, 2024	978-1-9753-4892-2
5	September 10, 2021	978-4-04-111903-7	June 18, 2024	978-1-9753-4894-6
6	April 8, 2022	978-4-04-112470-3	October 15, 2024	978-1-9753-6634-6
7	January 10, 2023	978-4-04-113247-0	February 18, 2025	978-1-9753-9016-7
8	March 25, 2024	978-4-04-114261-5	August 26, 2025	979-8-8554-1468-4
9	December 10, 2024	978-4-04-115728-2	May 26, 2026	979-8-8554-3339-5
10	June 10, 2025	978-4-04-116245-3	September 22, 2026	979-8-8554-3374-6

== Reception ==
Erica Friedman of Yuricon gave the series positive reviews, noting in her review of volume 1 that "I really enjoyed this book, enough that I finished it and started again to see what I had missed anything the first time around. ... The scenario of a mis-matched pair who completely work for and with each other appealed and it was especially nice to see tattoos and piercings not evidence of criminal class existence, just as body art."

Adam Symchuk of asianmoviepulse.com wrote of the series "despite an awkward flow that leaves the reader wanting more, "Assorted Entanglements" is a sharp and witty series that fills that ever-desired role of exploring mature relationships. Furthermore, Mikanuji does not shy away from difficult subject material to give a layer of realism that conveys the potential complexities surrounding both relationships with previous baggage and the societal problems lesbian couples face in Japan."
