= Now Loading...! =

Japanese manga series

- Tankōbon volume cover
- Genre: Slice of Life; Yuri
- Manga
- Written by: Mikanuji
- Published by: Ichijinsha
- English publisher: NA: Seven Seas Entertainment
- Magazine: Comic Yuri Hime
- Original run: November 18, 2016 – March 18, 2017
- Volumes: 1

Now Loading...! is a Japanese yuri manga series written and illustrated by Mikanuji. It was published in Ichijinsha's Comic Yuri Hime from November 2016, to March 2017, before being collected into a single tankōbon volume later that year. It is licensed for an English-language release by Seven Seas Entertainment.

== Synopsis ==
Having just started her dream job at a game publisher, Suzu Takagi is met with the harsh realities of working on a game that's falling apart and that the legendary director Kaori Sakurazuki seems to have it out for her. And so Takagi begins navigating games industry as well as her personal relationship with her boss Sakurazuki.

== Publication ==
Written and illustrated by Mikanuji, Now Loading...! was serialized in Ichijinsha's Comic Yuri Hime from November 18, 2016, to March 18, 2017. The series was collected into a tankōbon volume on April 18, 2017.

The series is licensed for an English release in North America by Seven Seas Entertainment.

No.	Original release date	Original ISBN	English release date	English ISBN
1	April 18, 2017	9784758076579	January 29, 2019	978-1-626929-84-5

== Reception ==
Erica Friedman of Yuricon gave the series an overall 5 out of 10 rating, noting that the relationship could have been more enjoyable were it not between a boss and their employee, she summarized that "I wanted to love this when it ran in Comic Yuri Hime. It could have been a 9 with a single change, but it was just too problematic for me to enjoy." DJ Horn of The Fandom Post praised Mikan Uji's art just felt the story itself lacked substance.
