= Syrup: A Yuri Anthology =

Japanese manga anthology

- English cover for Volume 1

シロップ 社会人百合アンソロジー (Syrup: Shakaijin Yuri Anthology)
- Genre: Drama, yuri
- Manga
- Published by: Futabasha
- English publisher: NA: Seven Seas Entertainment
- Original run: May 11, 2019 – August 11, 2020
- Volumes: 5

Syrup: A Yuri Anthology (シロップ 社会人百合アンソロジー) is a Japanese yuri manga anthology written and illustrated by numerous creators such as Kodama Naoko, Milk Morinaga, Pikachi Ohi and Kana Yoshimura. It was licensed for an English-language release by Seven Seas Entertainment in 2019.

== Publication ==
On May 11, 2019, Futabasha released Syrup Adult Yuri Anthology with the theme of love between adult women. The second release was announced in June 2019, and on August 8, Syrup SECRET Forbidden x Yuri Anthology was released with the theme of secret relationships. With the release of the second edition, a Twitter account "Futabasha Yuri Club" was opened to introduce syrup information and Futabasha's Yuri works. As of August 2020, 5 volumes have been released. Some chapters from Syrup were also included in issues of Monthly Action and Web Action.

No.	Title	Original release date	English release date
1	Syrup: A Yuri Anthology Vol. 1 Shiroppu Shakaijin Yuri Ansorojī (シロップ 社会人百合アンソロジー)	May 11, 2019; 978-4-575-85309-4	August 11, 2020; 978-1-64505-533-4
2	Syrup: A Yuri Anthology Vol. 2 Shiroppu Secret Kindan Kakeru Yuri Ansorojī (シロップ Secret 禁断×百合アンソロジー)	August 8, 2019; 978-4-575-85339-1	December 22, 2020; 978-1-64505-729-1
3	Syrup: A Yuri Anthology Vol. 3 Shiroppu Night Shoya Yuri Ansorojī (シロップ Night 初夜百合アンソロジー)	November 12, 2019; 978-4-575-85377-3	April 27, 2021; 978-1-64505-797-0
4	Syrup: A Yuri Anthology Vol. 4 Shiroppu Honey Shoya Yuri Ansorojī (シロップ Honey 初夜百合アンソロジー)	April 27, 2020; 978-4-575-85440-4	May 24, 2022; 978-1-64827-238-7
5	Syrup: A Yuri Anthology Vol. 5 Shiroppu Pure One Rori Yuri Ansorojī (シロップ Pure おねロリ百合アンソロジー)	August 11, 2020; 978-4-575-85481-7	—

== Reception ==
Anime News Network gave the first volume an overall C+ grade. Silverman notes that taken as whole "it is a bit more miss than hit with a high percentage of stories feeling truncated and at least one premise that badly suffers because of that." However, Silverman felt future volumes may show improvement. CBR had a more positive reception to the series, likening it to a collection of poems of various themes and praising volume 1's theme "Though the harsh realities of love as an adult are painfully clear, the sweetness of its title runs through it all." Writing on Okazu, Erica Friedman rated the first three volumes 9/10, 8/10, and 7/10 respectively, though she considered the dialogue and character behaviors in many of the stories in volume 1 to be unrealistic for lesbians.
