= Rica 'tte Kanji!? =

Japanese manga series by Rica Takashima

- Cover of a bilingual edition (Japanese and English) of Rica 'tte Kanji!? released by Anise

リカって感じ!?
- Genre: Romance, Slice of life, Yuri
- Manga
- Written by: Rica Takashima
- Published by: Anise
- English publisher: NA: ALC Publishing
- Magazine: Phryne; Anise
- Original run: 1995 – 1996
- Volumes: 1

Rica 'tte Kanji!? (Japanese: リカって感じ!?) is a Japanese yuri manga series written and illustrated by Rica Takashima. The series was first serialized in the Japanese manga magazine Phryne in 1995, and then moved to Anise in 1996. The manga was later licensed by ALC Publishing for release in English, with the first volume being released on June 19, 2003. Additional Rica 'tte Kanji! stories have been published in ALC Publishing's annual anthology Yuri Monogatari. Rica Takashima has stated in interviews that one of the reasons she created Rica 'tte Kanji!? was to have a yuri manga that was happy and about everyday life, unlike most yuri of the time, which typically ended in tragedy or were in a sci-fi setting. This manga is famous for being perhaps the first yuri manga published in English.

== Plot ==
Rica 'tte Kanji!? story revolves around the main character Rica, a new student at a Women's Junior College in Tokyo. Having never met another openly lesbian individual before, Rica visits Shinjuku Ni-chōme, Tokyo's gay and lesbian district. On her first night there, she makes several new friends, including Miho, a fine arts college student who eventually becomes Rica's girlfriend. Each chapter presents a slice of Rica's life, such as going on dates, preparing for Christmas, or doing college work.

== Characters ==
Rica Takashima
The main character of Rica 'tte Kanji!? Rica is a cheerful girl who moved to Tokyo to attend a Women's College to study early child development. Rica can occasionally be a little naïve at times, but her sunny enthusiasm is infectious. Though she was first viewed as fresh meat on the dating scene, her new Ni-chōme friends are quickly won over by her sweetness and innocence.
Miho
Miho is a fine arts student who is studying textiles. She is one of the first friends Rica makes in Tokyo, and Rica turns to Miho for dating advice and platonic companionship. However, Miho's feelings for Rica deepen beyond friendship, and the pair later start dating.

== Reception ==
Rica 'tte Kanji!? was given positive reviews from such sources as Animerica, a popular anime and manga magazine. The review praises Takashima's art style for matching the type of story she is telling, and states that the manga series' happy outlook makes it worth reading. In a review at Comic World News, David Welsh commented that "[Takashima's] work is like a less accomplished version of Bryan Lee O'Malley's (Lost At Sea, Scott Pilgrim)", adding that the manga series is "an admirable and endearing attempt to put some fun into yuri manga." Dillon Font from Anime Fringe complimented Rica 'tte Kanji!? for being "fun and enjoyable", adding, "[t]his comic work is beautiful, but lacks any real meat or troubles that would give the reader a more complete and fulfilling story."

In 2006, Professor Kerridwen Luis of Brandeis University chose Rica 'tte Kanji!? as course material for her Anthropology 166B course. The book was added to permanent collection of Kyoto International Manga Museum in 2011. An Italian edition was released by RenBooks, Bologna, Italy in 2011. An omnibus collection, titled TOKYO LOVE ~ Rica 'tte Kanji!?, was published in 2012 and named one of Best Manga 2013 by San Diego Comic-Con, and Otaku USA.
