= Poor Poor Lips =

Japanese yuri manga

- Final tankōbon volume cover

プアプアLIPS (Pua Pua Lips)
- Genre: Comedy; Romance; Yuri
- Manga
- Written by: Hayako Gotou
- Published by: Takeshobo
- English publisher: NA: JManga
- Magazine: Manga Life
- Original run: September 18, 2006 – September 17, 2012
- Volumes: 4

Poor Poor Lips (プアプアLIPS, Pua Pua Lips) is a Japanese yuri yonkoma manga written and illustrated by Hayako Gotou. It was serialized in Takeshobo's Manga Life from September 2006 to September 2012 and was licensed for an English-language release by JManga in 2012. The series follows Nako, a poor 21-year-old who begins working at a jewellery store along Ren, a rich lesbian who owns the store.

== Plot ==
Okashi Nako, a poor 21-year-old, is in severe need of a job when she applies to work in a jewellery store. When Otsuka Ren, the store's owner, identifies herself to be a lesbian, the competition for the job vanishes. When Ren wonders if her being a lesbian will be an issue, Nako has no issue with it and so she is hired.

== Publication ==
Written and illustrated by Hayako Gotou, Poor Poor Lips was serialized in Takeshobo's Manga Life from September 18, 2006, to September 17, 2012. The series was collected in four tankōbon volumes from June 2008 to October 2012.

The series was licensed for an English release digitally by JManga.

No.	Release date	ISBN
1	June 17, 2008	9784812468401
2	December 26, 2009	9784812472156
3	October 27, 2011	9784812476796
4	October 27, 2012	9784812480298

== Reception ==
Erica Friedman of Yuricon gave the first volume an overall 8 rating, while noting that the art style did not appeal to her, Friedman still went on to praise Poor Poor Lips leads, remarking that "the comic is a series of 4-koma strips, and range from beating Nako's state of poverty to death ... and to Ren's privilege and her orientation. But never in a mean way. Nako's not entirely naive, but she's not entirely clueful either, which makes for a nice mix of goofy silly and plain funny." Cathlyn Melo included Poor Poor Lips in their "11 Best Yuri Manga to Read in 2022", noting that "despite having a 4-koma style, the premise of Poor Poor Lips is also well structured."
