= NTR: Netsuzou Trap =

Japanese manga and anime series

- Cover for the first manga volume, showing Yuma (left) and Hotaru (right).

捏造トラップ-NTR- (Netsuzō Torappu -NTR-)
- Genre: Romance, yuri
- Manga
- Written by: Kodama Naoko
- Published by: Ichijinsha
- English publisher: NA: Seven Seas Entertainment
- Magazine: Comic Yuri Hime
- Original run: November 2014 – December 18, 2017
- Volumes: 6
- Anime television series
- Directed by: Hisayoshi Hirasawa
- Produced by: Airi Suzuki; Kanako Umezawa
- Written by: Words in Stereo; Yūichi Uchibori
- Music by: Isao
- Studio: Creators in Pack
- Licensed by: Crunchyroll
- Original network: AT-X, Tokyo MX, BS11, Tokyo MX 2
- Original run: July 5, 2017 – September 20, 2017
- Episodes: 12

NTR: Netsuzou Trap (Japanese: 捏造トラップ-NTR-, Hepburn: Netsuzō Torappu -NTR-; lit. "Fabricated Trap -NTR-") is a yuri manga series by Kodama Naoko. The story revolves around two high school girls/childhood friends, named Yuma and Hotaru, who each have a boyfriend but they secretly cheat with each other. Yuma cannot explain the feeling she gets around Hotaru, which eventually leads her to believe that their relationship may be more than just a friendship. The series was serialized in the monthly manga magazine Comic Yuri Hime from November 2014 to December 2017; the chapters were collected in six volumes. An anime television series adaptation by Creators in Pack aired from July to September 2017 and was simulcast with subtitles by Crunchyroll. Outside of Japan, the series is published in North America by Seven Seas Entertainment. The English version of the manga has received mixed reviews from critics.

== Plot ==
Yuma and Hotaru have been best friends since childhood. Yuma would protect Hotaru from things such as bullies, and made it her job to look after her. Now, the two are second-year high school students, but Hotaru is anything but innocent. Yuma gets her first boyfriend and is nervous about it, so a more experienced Hotaru suggests a "dress rehearsal" to help her out. The helping out later on leads to a deep kiss with Hotaru, who says that Yuma now knows how to kiss a guy. This leaves her thinking about how much better this kiss was than the one she had shared with her boyfriend. As time goes on, Yuma worries that her boyfriend will find out what is going on between her and Hotaru. She also cannot explain these "strange" feelings she has when she is with her.

== Characters ==
Yuma Okazaki (岡崎由真, Okazaki Yuma)
Voiced by: Ai Kakuma
Yuma is in her second year of high school along with her best friend Hotaru. When she finds her first boyfriend (Takeda) she is not sure how to react so she asks Hotaru for advice. Yuma is surprised though when it appears as if her friend is flirting with her. She cannot explain the good feeling she gets when she French kisses Hotaru or when she gets fondled, and worries that Takeda will catch her in the act. In the second volume he decides that the two should take some space apart, and Yuma comes to terms that she is in fact cheating with Hotaru. Her feelings still remain conflicted though as she does not want to hurt him so she remains as a friend. Yuma finally confesses to Hotaru in the fifth manga volume that she has feelings towards her but is rejected. She then turns to Takeda after feeling like she had been used the entire time by her.
Hotaru Mizushina (水科蛍, Mizushina Hotaru)
Voiced by: Hiromi Igarashi
Hotaru is Yuma's best friend since they were children. It is shown that early on Yuma would always protect her from things such as bullies at school, but over time she surpassed her in being bold. She eventually went out with many different boyfriends, but from Yuma's point of view she would never pay attention to any of them. She is shown to be aggressive with her feelings towards Yuma, making the first moves on more than one occasion. Yuma senses though that there might be trouble between her and Fujiwara despite Hotaru's strong attitude. She later takes a job at a shady cat maid café which alarms Yuma which makes her join as well. Hotaru eventually gets surprised by Yuma's bolder moves which makes her happy yet for some reason also in pain.
Takeda (武田)
Voiced by: Ryōta Ōsaka
Takeda is a classmate and friend of Hotaru, and is Yuma's first boyfriend. In the story he comes across as a friendly understanding guy who is aware of his girlfriend's shyness, and does his best to remedy the situation. He is unaware of Hotaru's advances towards Yuma, but later senses that she doesn't hold enough affection for him. Takeda eventually ends their dating relationship and tells Yuma to find out what she wants for herself before they go any further. The two remain friends until he starts to worry that Yuma may be in trouble with another person at Fujiwara's suggestion. He asks Yuma (who is crying) out again at the end of the fifth manga volume not knowing that she was just rejected by Hotaru.
Fujiwara (藤原)
Voiced by: Daisuke Ono
Fujiwara is Hotaru's boyfriend, and is friends with Takeda. Early on in the story he suspects that his girlfriend may not be committed to him but initially doesn't say anything. This changes later on though when he confirms his suspicion, and drops a hint to Yuma that he knows. It is suggested that he is physically abusive to Hotaru which causes concern for Yuma when she sees that Hotaru has a black eye. Fujiwara has stated that he plans to use the knowledge of the secret relationship between the two girls to his advantage in the form of sexual favors. The two dismiss his idea as a practical joke not knowing that he has "evidence" that implies the opposite. He later lies to Yuma saying that Hotaru is moving to get away from her, and Takeda about Yuma being in an abusive new relationship.

== Media ==
=== Manga ===
NTR: Netsuzou Trap was serialized in the manga magazine Comic Yuri Hime from November 2014 to December 18, 2017. The chapters were collected into tankōbon volumes starting on June 18, 2015, when the first volume was released; the last was number six. Seven Seas Entertainment licensed the manga in North America, and released the first volume on September 20, 2016. Seven Seas founder Jason DeAngelis had said that readers were requesting more yuri titles for release, and compared the series to Citrus in terms of potential enjoyment.

Kodama was originally considering a story between two brides, but thought that the characters seemed too old. She then had the two main characters aged down so that they were juniors in high school and liked the "sappy soap opera" results. The NTR in the title stands for netorare, which translates to "cheating" in Japanese. While the term is similar to cuckold ("husband of an adulterous wife") the couples involved here are not in a marital affair. In the story, the two girls cheat on their boyfriends by doing things with each other.

No.	Original release date	Original ISBN	English release date	English ISBN
1	June 18, 2015	978-4-758-07433-9	September 20, 2016	978-1-626923-35-5
2	March 18, 2016	978-4-758-07528-2	December 13, 2016	978-1-626923-75-1
3	November 18, 2016	978-4-758-07615-9	July 11, 2017	978-1-626924-61-1
4	April 18, 2017	978-4-758-07659-3	February 20, 2018	978-1-626926-87-5
5	July 18, 2017	978-4-758-07709-5	June 26, 2018	978-1-626928-11-4
6	January 18, 2018	978-4-758-07770-5	December 24, 2018	978-1-626929-73-9

=== Anime ===
An anime television series adaptation, directed by Hisayoshi Hirasawa and produced by Creators in Pack, aired in Japan between July 5 and September 20, 2017, and was simulcast by Crunchyroll. Words in Stereo and Yūichi Uchibori wrote the scripts, and Masaru Kawashima designed the characters. A new visual was unveiled on May 15, 2017. The opening theme is "Blue Bud Blue" by Haruka Tōjō while the ending theme is "Virginal lily" by Akira Aikase.

No.	Title (Note: All English titles are taken from Crunchyroll.)	Original release date
1	"A Secret Between Girls" "Onnanoko Dōshi no Himitsu" (女の子同士のヒミツ)	July 5, 2017
Yuma Okazaki, who has recently started dating her boyfriend, Takeda, becomes bewildered when her childhood friend and neighbor Hotaru Mizushina starts playing around with her in private. After sharing her first kiss with Takeda, Yuma is taken aback when Hotaru suddenly French kisses her under the pretense of "practice".
2	"Are Those Two..." "Ano Futari tte sa..." (あの二人ってさ…)	July 12, 2017
Takeda considers inviting Yuma to sleep over at his place, but after hearing some jealous remarks from Hotaru decides to invite both of them, along with Hotaru's boyfriend Fujiwara, to an amusement park instead. Following some aggressive behavior from Fujiwara, Hotaru makes more advances on Yuma, which makes Fujiwara suspicious.
3	"Shall We Practice Again?" "Mata Renshū Shiyokka" (また練習しよっか)	July 19, 2017
Everyone goes on a trip to a ski resort, where Hotaru makes more moves on Yuma in the bath. As things between Yuma and Hotaru become more intense the next day, Fujiwara spots them kissing, using it as leverage against Hotaru.
4	"...I'm Cheating, Too?" "... Watashi mo Uwaki Shiterushi?" (…私も浮気してるし？)	July 26, 2017
After noticing that Hotaru and Fujiawara had slept together, Yuma attempts to spend the night with Takeda, but finds herself unable to go through with anything. Upon hearing rumors at school that Fujiwara may be cheating on her, Yuma goes to visit Hotaru, discovering she has a suspicious eye injury. When asked about Fujiwara's alleged cheating, Hotaru remarks that she herself is cheating with Yuma, making another move on her while she is on the phone with Takeda.
5	"I'm So Fed Up With Myself..." "Jibun ga Iya de Shikatanai yo..." (自分が嫌で仕方ないよ……)	August 2, 2017
While preparing for a date with Takeda, Yuma comes to Hotaru's house and discovers that she has a black eye, suspecting that Fujiwara is the one who caused it. After taking too much time trying to confront Fujiwara, Yuma ends up late for her date with Takeda, who then calls her telling him they should spend time apart. The next day, after Yuma spends the night at Hotaru's place, they are approached by Fujiwara, who threatens to tell Takeda about their relationship.
6	"Did You Think I Was Going to Kiss You?" "Kisu Sareruto Omotta?" (キスされると思った?)	August 9, 2017
As Yuma remains uneasy about Fujiwara's threat and Hotaru's insistence on dating him, she recalls the anguish she felt when Hotaru first started dating boys in high school. Confused by her feelings, Yuma allows Hotaru to make a move on her. Just then, however, Fujiwara takes an incriminating photo of the two.
7	"We'll Always Be Best Friends, Right?" "Shinyū de Irareru yo ne?" (親友でいられるよね？)	August 16, 2017
Hotaru has Fujiwara delete the photo and sleeps with him, claiming what she does with Yuma is just fooling around. The next day, Hotaru tries to encourage Yuma and Takeda to get back together, telling Yuma that she will stop her advances. As Yuma's feelings remain complicated, Hotaru starts a new job.
8	"Uncontrollable Feelings" "Seigyo Dekinai Kanjō" (制御できない感情)	August 23, 2017
After attending cram school with Takeda, Yuma spots Hotaru enter a building, which turns out to be a hostess club she is working at. Not wanting to leave Hotaru on her own, Yuma ends up working at the club as well. Curious as to why Hotaru needs the money, Yuma hears from Fujiwara that Hotaru allegedly wants to move away from her.
9	"Give Me Your Cold" "Watashi ni, Kaze Utsushite...?" (私に、風邪うつして……?)	August 30, 2017
As Yuma continues to work at the club even without Hotaru around, she ends up catching a cold. When Hotaru comes to check up on her, Yuma kisses her of her own initiative, leading Takeda to come across them in a compromising situation.
10	"What Exactly Is Our Relationship?" "Kono Kankei wa Nan Nandarō" (この関係は何なんだろう)	September 6, 2017
As Hotaru somehow manages to fool Takeda, she is again approached by Fujiwara after he spots her kissing Yuma again. It is revealed that Hotaru and Fujiwara began their loveless relationship as part of a deal to answer each other's desires without prying into their lives.
11	"Thanks, And I'm Sorry" "Arigatō, Gomen ne" (ありがとう、ごめんね)	September 13, 2017
While speaking with Takeda about her troubles, Yuma starts to suspect that she might be in love with Hotaru. When Yuma tries to confess her feelings, however, Hotaru just dodges the subject. Later that night, Yuma hears noises from Hotaru's apartment and witnesses firsthand Fujiwara beating her.
12	"Why Did It Take Me This Long to Realize?" "Dōshite Imamade Kizukanakattan Darō" (どうして今まで気づかなかったんだろう)	September 20, 2017
Yuma tries to convince Hotaru to break up with Fujiwara, but she remains defiant. After receiving some words of encouragement from Takeda and confronting Fujiwara, Yuma finally realizes that Hotaru has had feelings for her all along and confesses her love for her.

== Reception ==
The English version of NTR: Netsuzou Trap has received mixed reviews from manga critics. Rebecca Silverman from Anime News Network gave the series an overall C+ grade. She felt that it is a "fairly unusual yuri story", similar to what is seen in yaoi, because of the sexually aggressive nature of the romance. Silverman stated there is a strong indication that Hotaru is using boys to get over Yuma, and that Hotaru not appearing to particularly love Yuma might be masked feelings due to past problems. Although Silverman felt that it is good that the series offers variety for those who like this kind of story, and that, unlike with Hotaru, readers get a better feel for Yuma's character, she felt that the story's "less consensual romance" is uncomfortable, and critiqued the artwork of the character's upper bodies; she did, however, praise the artwork involving the character's legs. Journalist Kat Callahan agreed with Silverman on the series not being a typical example of a yuri series. She writes in her review that the series deals with the cycle of abuse when it comes to Hotaru, and that Yuma is also a victim as a result.

Yuricon founder Erica Friedman described the story as "creeptastic", saying that it is about girls who get naked to do stuff with each other while their boyfriends are "conveniently not in the room with them". Sean Gaffney from Manga Bookshelf wrote that the first volume is not for its intended audience and recommends it instead for adult men who think that girl-on-girl action is attractive.
