= The Lying Bride and the Same-Sex Marriage Debate =

Japanese yuri manga

- Volume 1 Japanese Cover

嘘つき花嫁と同性結婚論 (Usotsuki Hanayome to Dōsei Kekkon-ron)
- Genre: Romance; Drama; Yuri
- Manga
- Written by: Kodama Naoko
- Published by: Ichijinsha
- English publisher: NA: Seven Seas Entertainment
- Imprint: Yuri Hime Comics
- Magazine: Comic Yuri Hime
- Original run: September 15, 2023 – August 17, 2024
- Volumes: 2

The Lying Bride and the Same-Sex Marriage Debate (Japanese: 嘘つき花嫁と同性結婚論, Hepburn: Usotsuki Hanayome to Dōsei Kekkon-ron) is a Japanese yuri manga series written and illustrated by Kodama Naoko. It was serialized in Ichijinsha's Comic Yuri Hime from September 2023 to August 2024, and is licensed for an English-language release by Seven Seas Entertainment.

== Synopsis ==
Shigisawa Rei, a lesbian who has devoted herself to her work, is fed up with a society that forces her to cater to the expectation of getting married, even though same-sex marriage is not permitted in Japan and she sees no future in which she can get married. One day, she bumps into Saya, a former colleague who Rei once had feelings for who quit her job once she got married. Saya asks Rei if she can stay at her apartment as she had recently had a falling out with her husband, and while Rei agrees to help she soon finds her old feelings for Saya bubbling to the surface.

== Publication ==
Written and illustrated by Kodama Naoko, The Lying Bride and the Same-Sex Marriage Debate was serializated in Ichijinsha's Comic Yuri Hime on from September 15, 2023, to August 17, 2024. The series has been collected into 2 tankōbon volumes as of May 17, 2023.

The series is licensed for an English release in North America by Seven Seas Entertainment.

No.	Original release date	Original ISBN	English release date	English ISBN
1	April 17, 2024	9784758026970	October 7, 2025	979-8-89561-222-4
2	October 18, 2024	9784758027618	March 31, 2026	979-8-89561-223-1

== Reception ==
In Anime News Network's Fall 2025 Manga Guide, Rebecca Silverman gave the first volume of The Lying Bride and the Same-Sex Marriage Debate a 3 out of 5 rating, while Erica Friedman gave it a 4 out 5. Silverman noted when compared to Kodama's past works that the series "suffers from some of Kodama's persistent issues, most of which are in the realm of poor character writing and imperfectly paced plots, but on the whole [The Lying Bride and the Same-Sex Marriage Debate] is a more engaging story."
