= Whenever Our Eyes Meet... A Women's Love Anthology =

Japanese manga anthology

- Whenever Our Eyes Meet...: A Women's Love Anthology
- First tankōbon volume cover

あの娘と目が合うたび私は 社会人百合アンソロジー (Ano Musume to Me ga Au Tabi Watashi wa Shakaijin Yuri Anthology)
- Genre: Yuri
- Manga
- Written by: Various
- Published by: ASCII Media Works
- English publisher: NA: Yen Press
- Original run: April 27, 2018 – September 27, 2019
- Volumes: 5

Whenever Our Eyes Meet...: A Women's Love Anthology (あの娘と目が合うたび私は 社会人百合アンソロジー) is a Japanese yuri manga anthology written and illustrated by numerous creators such as Oku Tamamushi, Mikanuji and Koruse. It published 5 anthologies between April, 2018 and September, 2019. The first volume was licensed for an English-language release by Yen Press.

== Publication ==
The first volume of Whenever Our Eyes Meet...: A Women's Love Anthology released on April 27, 2018 with the following 4 volumes being released throughout 2018 and 2019.

The first volume is licensed for an English release in North America by Yen Press

No.	Title	Original release date	English release date
1	Whenever Our Eyes Meet...: A Women's Love Anthology あの娘と目が合うたび私は 社会人百合アンソロジー	April 27, 2018; 9784048937757	June 18, 2019; 9781975357580
2	Anata no soba ni iru to watashi wa shakai hito Yuri ansorojī (あなたの側にいると私は 社会人百合アンソロジー)	October 26, 2018; 9784049121261	—
3	White Lilies in rabu hana kaoru toki, anata wa. Shakai hito Yuri ansorojī (White Lilies in Love 花香るとき、貴方は。 社会人百合アンソロジー)	April 27, 2019; 9784049125009	—
4	White Lilies in rabu watashi ga yoishireru no wa, natsu no hizashi to anata dake. Shakai hito Yuri ansorojī (White Lilies in Love 私が酔いしれるのは、夏の陽射しと貴方だけ。 社会人百合アンソロジー)	July 26, 2019; 9784049126600	—
5	White Lilies in rabu akane sasu koigokoro o, akaku somete hoshī no anata ni. Shakai hito Yuri ansorojī (White Lilies in Love 茜さす恋心を、紅く染めてほしいの貴方に。 社会人百合アンソロジー)	September 27, 2019; 9784049127812	—

== Reception ==
Rebecca Silverman for Anime News Network gave Whenever Our Eyes Meet… an overall B rating; remarking that the variety of creators, some of whom this was their first translated works and others being their first published work, contributed to the interest of the book overall. Silverman noted that "while the stories are perhaps only “mature” in that they're about adult women, this is still a charming anthology. It has a nice variety of scenarios and professions in the stories, and the color illustrations are especially attractive. Every so often it's nice to read about older characters, and if that and yuri are both things you enjoy, I'd suggest checking this out."

Whenever Our Eyes Meet... was among WomenWriteAboutComics's yuri recommendations for Pride month, with Masha Zhdanova remarking that "I’m not a fan of every story in this anthology, but I appreciate the variety, and I think it’s a good example of the range this genre is capable of."
