= Kodama Naoko =

Japanese manga artist

- Born: 28 October
- Known for: Yuri manga
- Website: nk.monaco.her.jp

Kodama Naoko (コダマナオコ) is a Japanese manga artist. She is best known as a writer and illustrator of yuri manga, and as the creator of NTR: Netsuzou Trap and I Married My Best Friend To Shut My Parents Up.

== Biography ==
Kodama made her debut as a manga artist in 2006, in the manga magazine Renai Paradise published by Takeshobo. Among her early career credits include works in Comic Yell!, Aria, and Tsubomi. In 2012, she would begin contributing works to the yuri manga magazine Comic Yuri Hime; her first serialized work, NTR: Netsuzou Trap, would be published in the magazine from 2014 to 2017, and was adapted into an anime series by Creators in Pack in 2017.

== Works ==
- Nasty Brother (お兄ちゃんのイジワル) (2009, Takeshobo)
- Gakuen Harem (学園ハーレム) (2010, Takeshobo)
- Your Toys (あなたのオモチャ) (2011, Takeshobo)
- Bakemono Club (ばけものくらぶ) (2011, Kodansha)
- Fujiyuu Sekai (不自由セカイ) (2012, Comic Yuri Hime)
- Zankou Noise (残光ノイズ) (2013, Comic Yuri Hime)
- Lust Target (欲情ターゲット) (2014, Takeshobo)
- Cocytus (コキュートス) (2014, Comic Yuri Hime)
- Renai Paradise New Edition (レンアイマンガ 新装版) (2014, Ichijinsha)
- NTR: Netsuzou Trap (2014, Ichijinsha)
- I Married My Best Friend To Shut My Parents Up (2018, Ichijinsha)
- Days of Love at Seagull Villa (2019, Ichijinsha)
- The Lying Bride and the Same-Sex Marriage Debate (2023, Ichijinsha)

=== Anthologies ===
- Yurihime Wildrose (Comic Yuri Hime)
  - Yurihime Wildrose Vol. 7
  - Yurihime Wildrose Vol. 8
- Syrup: A Yuri Anthology
  - Syrup: A Yuri Anthology Vol. 1
  - Syrup: A Yuri Anthology Vol. 2
  - Syrup: A Yuri Anthology Vol. 3
  - Syrup: A Yuri Anthology Vol. 4
