= By Your Side (book) =

2022 book by Erica Friedman

By Your Side: The First 100 Years of Yuri Anime and Manga
- Author: Erica Friedman
- Cover artist: Rica Takashima
- Language: English
- Subject: Yuri
- Genre: Academic
- Publisher: Journey Press
- Publication date: April 25, 2022
- Publication place: United States
- Media type: Print (Paperback), Digital
- Pages: 282
- ISBN: 1951320204

By Your Side: The First 100 Years of Yuri Anime and Manga is a book of essays by Erica Friedman. Published by Journey Press in 2022, it was the first substantial English-language work to cover the history of yuri.

== Contents ==
The book is a collection of essays, articles and lectures written by Friedman, covering the history of yuri over 13 chapters. It draws from work from her own blog and various other online and print publications, as well as original material written for the book itself. It details the genre's influences and beginnings in Japan from the 20th century to its growth and global expansion in the 21st century.

== Reception ==
Rebecca Silverman of Anime News Network praised the historical context the book gives to the publication of yuri in both English and Japanese, including early works that are currently unavailable in English. Silverman also noted there is some "repetition of concepts and content" in the book due to many of the essays originally being published in other venues, however Silverman did not believe this to solely be a weakness, believing "it serves as an aid to understanding key points and how Friedman's own writing and analysis has grown and changed over time as the genre has".

Jonathan Clements also noted that a more mainstream publisher might have pushed Friedman to write a more cohesive single narrative of the genre's history, rather than the collection of essays that By Your Side draws from, however he felt this did not detract from the book's overall usefulness as each essay gave comments to aid in understanding their original context.
