= Whispered Words =

Japanese manga and anime series

- Cover of Sasameki Koto volume 1 as published by Media Factory

ささめきこと (Sasameki Koto)
- Genre: Romantic comedy, yuri
- Manga
- Written by: Takashi Ikeda
- Published by: Media Factory
- English publisher: NA: One Peace Books
- Magazine: Monthly Comic Alive
- Original run: March 2007 – November 2011
- Volumes: 9
- Anime television series
- Directed by: Eiji Suganuma
- Produced by: Shinobu Yoshinuma; Tomoyoshi Koyama; Shousei Ito
- Written by: Hideyuki Kurata
- Music by: Shigeomi Hasumi
- Studio: AIC
- Original network: TV Tokyo
- Original run: October 7, 2009 – December 30, 2009
- Episodes: 13

Whispered Words (Japanese: ささめきこと, Hepburn: Sasameki Koto) is a Japanese yuri manga series written and illustrated by Takashi Ikeda. It was serialized in Media Factory's seinen manga magazine Monthly Comic Alive between March 2007 and November 2011, and was compiled into nine tankōbon volumes. A canon Drama CD musical spin-off was released on 23 Dec 2009, titled The Longest Day of Sumika. The series has been licensed in North America by One Peace Books. It was adapted as a 13-episode anime television series produced by AIC that aired between October and December 2009 on TV Tokyo. The series, which is set in a co-ed high school, is about Sumika Murasame, a 15-year-old girl who is secretly in love with her female best friend, Ushio Kazama. Ushio likes girls too, but is only into "cute" and "small" girls, while Sumika is tall, good at sports, and outgoing rather than shy.

== Plot ==
Sumika Murasame is a high school girl who is in love with her female best friend Ushio Kazama, but is unable to confess how she feels as Ushio only likes girls she considers to be "cute" and "small", while Sumika is tall and athletic. Sumika discovers one of her classmates, a boy named Masaki Akemiya who likes her, started cross-dressing to catch her attention, but inadvertently was hired as a model. Sumika and Ushio get to know two girls in their class who are a couple, Tomoe Hachikusa and Miyako Taema; Tomoe wants to start a "girl's club" where only lesbians can join but is wrought with opposition. Sumika agrees to go on one date with Masaki, who comes cross-dressed as his female persona Akemi Yamasaki. Sumika becomes involved with her classmate Azusa Aoi, a quiet girl and aspiring writer who plans to attend a dōjinshi convention fueled by her love of yuri author Orino Masaka, which is the pen name of Ushio's older brother Norio. Sumika gets roped into helping Azusa and attending the summer convention as well, despite wanting to spend time with Ushio.

After the sports day competition and cultural festival, a short German high school girl named Charlotte Münchhausen (nicknamed Lotte), comes to stay at Sumika's home and dojo to train in karate. Sumika, who had quit karate because it is not "cute", starts training again to help in Charlotte's training, much to the joy of Sumika's father. Ushio is unhappy about Charlotte's training and merely wants her to be a gentle, cute girl. Charlotte gets sick after running in the rain during training, and after Ushio confronts her about it, Sumika lashes out, distraught how she cannot become any cuter or smaller. Following Tomoe's suggestion, a female karate club is formed with Sumika as the president and Charlotte as the vice-president. After Ushio starts realizing she has romantic feelings for Sumika, she starts to worry that Sumika may stop being friends with her. Masaki stops being a fashion model after being traumatically exposed as a cross-dresser.

After Sumika and her friends enter their second year of high school, two first-year girls named Mayu Semimaru and Koino Matsubara join the female karate club. Sumika is troubled over her relationship with Ushio, which has an adverse effect on her karate performance, much to the disappointment of Mayu. Sumika starts to get more involved with karate training to take her mind off of Ushio and in doing so, inadvertently distances herself from her. Ushio breaks down in depression because of this distancing, which results in Ushio breaking her arm, but is able to make up with Sumika. Tomoe accidentally implies to Ushio that Sumika has romantic feelings for her, much to Ushio's surprise, and Ushio finally accepts that she has fallen in love with Sumika but decides to become less dependent on her friend before confessing because she believes love will always fail for her. Meanwhile, Mayu realizes that she might have romantic feelings for Sumika as well, which distracts her in a karate tournament. Later, Sumika runs for student council president, though runs into various problems concerning rumours about her, and is forced to recede when Mayu ends up punching another student for insulting Sumika. As such, Ushio ends up becoming the new student council president.

== Characters ==
Sumika Murasame (村雨 純夏, Murasame Sumika)
Voiced by: Ayahi Takagaki
The main character of the story, Sumika is intelligent, tall with long black hair and athletically gifted. Her family runs a karate dojo, so she has practiced martial arts since she was little, quickly becoming very strong, even being considered a karate "genius". However, after realizing she was in love with Ushio she decided to quit in order to try to become "cuter". Due to her abilities she's popular at school and, despite her personality not being violent at all, she's sometimes nicknamed "Violent Murasame". She secretly loves Ushio, but the fact that Ushio doesn't return her feelings at all makes her suffer. Often she tries acting cuter, but the results aren't great and Ushio remains oblivious to Sumika's feelings.
Ushio Kazama (風間 汐, Kazama Ushio)
Voiced by: Megumi Takamoto
Sumika's best friend and classmate who lives alone with her brother, Ushio is a naive girl madly in love with cute girls. She often gets crushes but they are all one-sided. She considers Sumika to be a very precious friend and often says that she is "cool", "not cute" and "not her type". She is completely unaware of Sumika's feelings and her inner reaction to these words. She herself develops feelings for Sumika, but is afraid to act on them based on a bad experience with one of her old friends. She later learns from Tomoe that Sumika is in love with her too, and slowly starts to give Sumika hints.
Tomoe Hachisuka (蓮賀 朋絵, Hachisuka Tomoe)
Voiced by: Hitomi Harada
A classmate of Sumika and Ushio who is also a lesbian. She is in a relationship with another classmate, Miyako Taema. She is 18 years old, having taken two years off from school to save her family's corporation from bankruptcy (a feat publicly attributed to her father). Due to this age difference, she has a more mature outlook on life than the other characters. The Hachisuka family is very wealthy and traditional, but they have no choice but to accept Tomoe's habits. She claims that "high school is all about being in clubs", so she tries to set up a "Girls' Club" for "girl-loving girls who had no choice but to enter a co-ed school". The proposal is rejected and the girls later reform it into a karate club. She has a driver's license but is a dangerously bad driver.
Miyako Taema (当麻 みやこ, Taema Miyako)
Voiced by: Chiwa Saitō
Tomoe's girlfriend. While she looks like an innocent and clumsy girl, and is popular with boys (who nickname her "Princess"), her true self is quite different, having a devilish, bad-mannered personality, and is always prone to bad-mouth or tease other people. Tomoe is the only one able to 'control' her; they are always together, and for this reason they had no friends before befriending Sumika and the others. Miyako is a daughter of Hachisuka family's driver, a fact that doesn't sit well with the rest of Tomoe's household, but as with other things, they cannot go against her.
Azusa Aoi (蒼井 あずさ, Aoi Azusa)
Voiced by: Mayuki Makiguchi
A classmate of the main characters, she is introduced in volume 2. Aoi is a yuri fan, in particular she loves the works of the shōjo novelist Orino Masaka, unaware that the author is actually Ushio's brother, Norio, using a pen name. Sumika knows this but she doesn't want to disappoint her, so she keeps it secret. Aoi thinks that love between girls must be something completely pure and fragile, hidden away from people's eyes; for this reason she doesn't like Tomoe and Miyako's relationship, considering them way too blatant. She likes attending yuri-only events and writing yuri dōjinshi, and she wishes to do so with Sumika.
Masaki Akemiya (朱宮 正樹, Akemiya Masaki)
Voiced by: Ayaka Shimizu
A shy classmate of the main characters. He likes Sumika, but when he notices that she likes Ushio he cross-dresses in order to catch her attention. His younger sister finds out and sends pictures of him to a magazine. To his dismay, he is chosen as a model and pictures of him start appearing in magazines under the alias Akemi Yamasaki (山崎 アケミ, Yamasaki Akemi). Ushio sees the pictures and develops a crush on Akemi and wants to meet 'her'. Akemi's career ends when her 'manhood' is accidentally revealed during a fashion show, but the company keeps Masaki's identity a secret.
Charlotte Münchhausen (シャルロッテ・ミュンヒハウゼン, Sharurotte Myunhihauzen)
A German girl, nicknamed Lotte, introduced in volume three. She's short and she has a very childish appearance; her silky blonde hair and blue eyes make her seem like a doll. Ushio falls for her at first sight and she calls her an 'angel'. Despite her appearance, Lotte's personality isn't feminine at all: she has a harsh way of speaking, she practices karate and wants to become cool and strong like Sumika. She also acts innocently and naively, and at first she's easily tricked by Ushio into wearing cute dresses. When at school she wears a gakuran, a schoolboy's uniform, in order to preserve the "Japanese spirit".
Kiyori Torioi (鳥追 きより, Torioi Kiyori)
Voiced by: Emiri Katō
A classmate and friend of Sumika and Ushio, they often eat lunch together. She has a happy personality and she loves eating a lot, particularly curry bread. According to Sumika, she's straight and politely declines any involvement in the dubious activities proposed by Ushio and Tomoe.
Mayu Semimaru (蝉丸 まゆ, Semimaru Mayu)
A first year student who joins the karate club after Sumika and the others enter their second year of high school. She is an admirer of Sumika's fighting ability and is rather vocal when she does not live to her expectations. Contrary to her stoic appearance, she tends to not be very level headed. She later harbors feelings for Sumika herself, finding herself jealous whenever she sees her with Ushio.
Koino Matsubara (松原 恋乃, Matsubara Koino)
Another first year student and Mayu's best friend, who also joins the karate club. Like Mayu, contrary to Koino's cheerful appearance and attitude, she is the more level headed of the two. Her personality has been affected by witnessing her mother constantly change partners. She is the only one who knows of Mayu's crush on Sumika and soon starts to develop feelings for Mayu herself.
Norio Kazama (風間 規夫, Kazama Norio)
Voiced by: Wataru Hatano
Ushio's older brother. They live alone in a messy house. He is a writer who publishes shōjo yuri novels under the pen name of Orino Masaka (written in kana, it is almost exactly "Kazama Norio" when written backwards). His true identity is not known to his audience, so he is believed to be female.
Manaka Akemiya (朱宮 万奈歌, Akemiya Manaka)
Voiced by: Ayana Taketatsu
Masaki's younger sister and the one responsible for throwing him into the modeling business. Although rather teasing in this aspect, she does try to help her brother in her own way as shown when she concocts a scheme to get him together with Sumika.

== Production ==
Whispered Words was written and illustrated by Takashi Ikeda. After joining an independent film crew while in college, Ikeda decided to start drawing on manga as a way to create projects all on his own. His second manga work was submitted to the Shogakukan magazine Big Comic Spirits and subsequently won a small award. Whispered Words was originally conceived as a one-shot manga by Ikeda. Media Factory featured it in this for in the March 2007 of its magazine Monthly Comic Alive before picking it up for full serialization a few months later. After Whispered Words was translated for North American release, Ikeda stated he was unsure if would ever create another yuri-themed manga. Ikeda later authored the yuri manga series The Two of Them Are Pretty Much Like This, which was serialized on publisher Gentosha's Comic Boost website between January 2020 and February 2022 and localized in North America by Seven Seas Entertainment.

== Media ==
=== Manga ===
The Whispered Words manga was serialized in Japan in Media Factory's seinen magazine Monthly Comic Alive between its March 2007 and November 2011 issues. The chapters were collected into nine tankōbon volumes released between December 22, 2007, and January 23, 2012. One Peace Books localized the manga for North American release, compiling the original nine tankōbon volumes into three larger graphic novels and releasing the series between May 13, 2014, and March 17, 2015. The manga has also been licensed for release in Taiwan by Sharp Point Press.

Original No.	Original Release Date	Original ISBN	English No.	English Release Date	English ISBN
1	December 22, 2007	978-4-8401-1978-8	1	May 13, 2014	978-1-935548-45-4
2	April 23, 2008	978-4-8401-2219-1	1	May 13, 2014	978-1-935548-45-4
3	September 22, 2008	978-4-8401-2270-2	1	May 13, 2014	978-1-935548-45-4
4	March 23, 2009	978-4-8401-2550-5	2	November 18, 2014	978-1-935548-57-7
5	September 23, 2009	978-4-8401-2916-9	2	November 18, 2014	978-1-935548-57-7
6	March 23, 2010	978-4-8401-3303-6	2	November 18, 2014	978-1-935548-57-7
7	October 23, 2010	978-4-8401-3386-9	3	March 17, 2015	978-1-935548-87-4
8	February 23, 2011	978-4-8401-3753-9	3	March 17, 2015	978-1-935548-87-4
9	January 23, 2012	978-4-8401-4095-9	3	March 17, 2015	978-1-935548-87-4

=== Drama CD ===
A Drama CD musical was released on 23 December 2009 titled The Longest Day of Sumika. The events of the CD are canon and referenced in the manga, taking place during Sumika's birthday in the first year of the story.

=== Anime ===
A 13-episode anime television series produced by AIC aired on TV Tokyo and TV Aichi between October 7 and December 30, 2009, with rebroadcasts on other stations and AT-X a few days later, and was simulcast by Crunchyroll. The anime takes plot material based on the manga, with the exception of episode twelve, which is an anime-original story. The opening theme song is "Kanashii Hodo Aoku" (悲しいほど青く, So Blue it is Sad) and the ending theme song is "Niji-iro Pocket" (虹色ポケット, Rainbow-colored Pocket); both songs are sung by Natsumi Kiyoura.

No.	Title	Original release date
1	"Whispered Words" "Sasameki Koto" (ささめきこと)	October 7, 2009
Sumika Murasame's friend, Ushio Kazama, reveals that she has a crush on a second-year girl from the school library, Chizuka Nishikigi. Sumika warns Ushio that Chizuka may have someone else she likes and that Ushio would just get crushed, which makes Ushio unhappy. The next day, Sumika saves Masaki Akemiya from a falling box, though she denies that she is a nice person. Later that day, Chizuka turns against Ushio because the guy she liked had taken an interest in Ushio instead. Sumika, who had waited to apologize to Ushio, then arrives to comfort her and later makes up with her.
2	"Cute People" "Kawaii Hitotachi" (かわいいひとたち)	October 14, 2009
Ushio fawns over a cute looking model in a magazine. Meanwhile, Sumika is a bit downhearted that she herself is not what people would consider cute. She becomes a bit surprised when Masaki calls her cute, though it manages to lift her spirits. Sumika tries to confess to Ushio, but is abruptly told she is "not her type" before she has a chance. Just then, Ushio spots the model, who immediately runs off. Sumika chases her on behalf of Ushio only to discover that the model is actually Masaki, who had been crossdressing to get Sumika's attention. She rejects him, but points out that neither of them will give up even after rejection.
3	"First Kiss" "Fāsuto Kisu" (ファーストキス)	October 21, 2009
Late afternoon at school, Sumika and Ushio catch two girls kissing each other. When the next day's discussion turns to first kisses, Ushio gets the crazy idea of having a practice first kiss. Sumika, feeling a bit dejected that Ushio would rather practice on a model skeleton than her, and decides to take up karate again, having previously quit because she felt it was not cute. The next day, Ushio asks Sumika to meet her after school. Assuming Sumika had someone else in mind, Ushio lets her have her practice first kiss on her while wearing an Ultraman mask. As she does, they are watched by the two girls that Sumika and Ushio had seen kissing each other before.
4	"4+1"	October 28, 2009
As Sumika recognizes Tomoe Hachisuka and Miyako Taema as the girls she and Ushio saw kissing the other day, Tomoe whispers in her ear that she saw her with Ushio. Tomoe reveals to Sumika her vision of a girls only club, and Miyako attempts to blackmail her into joining, but Sumika tells her that she and Ushio are not a couple. Both Tomoe and Miyako notice that Sumika has a crush on Ushio, who they later convince into joining them, leaving one more member to find. Sumika decides to use Masaki's cross-dressing skills in order to get reactions from potential girl-liking girls. He goes a bit over-the-top with his confessions and scares everyone off. Sumika decides to try again with his usual wig he wears when cross-dressing as Akemi Yamasaki, but when Ushio spots him, he is enrolled into the club and 'Akemi' is made into a transfer student. However, the club application is rejected.
5	"Friends"	November 4, 2009
Tomoe and Miyako come to Sumika's house for a study session, although they are really thinking up plans for their girl's club. Sumika has trouble juggling both them and her in-house maid who embarrasses her. The next day they decide to take their 'studying' over to Ushio's house, where Sumika notices she and Ushio both have the same photo of each other taken on the first day of school displayed in their rooms. Preparations for dinner soon turns into a battle between Sumika and Miyako, which ends with explosive results. After another failed attempt at working together to cook, Ushio's brother, Norio, arrives with some takoyaki and are later joined by their friend Kiyori Torioi. After leaving, Tomoe and Miyako thank Sumika for helping them get friends. When Sumika gets home, she prints out a photo of the five of them together.
6	"The Couple's Night" "Futari no Yoru" (二人の夜)	November 11, 2009
Ushio is still having trouble facing Chizuka following the incident between them, even though she allegedly wants to apologize to her. Noticing Chizuka's clumsy traits, Tomoe and Miyako decide to train Sumika into becoming a clumsy girl that Ushio would fall for, with poor results. Later, Ushio comes over to Sumika's house instead of going to meet with Chizuka. Sumika notices Ushio is lying about not having feelings for Chizuka anymore. Later that night, Ushio offers to wash Sumika's back, but Sumika just ends up fainting from embarrassment. Ushio berates herself for selfishly liking and then disliking Chizuka, but Sumika tells her it is not her fault. The next morning, Ushio goes to Chizuka to apologize and confess, much to Sumika's dismay.
7	"Boys and Girls" "Shōnen Shōjo" (少年少女)	November 18, 2009
Masaki's younger sister Manaka sneaks into school to confront Sumika over why she rejected him. Using some pity tactics, Manaka manages to get Sumika to agree to go on a date with Masaki. Come Sunday, Masaki meets up with Sumika while cross-dressing, and Manaka follows them, using a plan to get them together. Meanwhile, Ushio gets a little worried when she cannot get into contact with Sumika. Manaka recommends they go see a romance film, but they end up watching a horror instead. Next, Sumika and Masaki have lunch, though Manaka is unable to sneak love potion into Sumika's food due to her unconvincing waitress disguise. While clothes shopping, Sumika cannot handle the fact that Masaki acts more cute and girly than herself, and she runs off only to be ambushed by a trio of creepy otaku Manaka had recruited to make Masaki look like a hero. Masaki leads them away from Sumika, but soon finds himself in trouble when they will not leave him alone even after he reveals he is a guy. At the end of the day, Masaki simply tells Manaka not to do something like that again, while Sumika checks her phone to find six voice messages from Ushio.
8	"Ripple"	November 25, 2009
Some classmates ask about whether Tomoe and Miyako are actually dating. When another classmate, Azusa Aoi, complains about such scandalous talk, she gets kissed by Tomoe and runs off in embarrassment. Sumika later catches up to Azusa and learns she is a fan of Masaka Orino, who unknown to her is actually Norio's pen name. Learning Sumika has heard of 'her' works, Azusa feels relieved and becomes friends with her. Just then, they fall down some stairs, only to be spotted by Ushio in a compromising position. Sumika catches up to her, and to both of their surprise, Ushio starts crying. Noticing the awkwardness between them, Tomoe arranges for Sumika and Ushio to have a private talk. Ushio assumes her tears were from seeing Sumika acting like a violent man, but knows she wouldn't really do something like that. Azusa appears out of the blue, bring with her some dōjinshi of Orino's work, putting pressure on Ushio to keep Norio's identity a secret. As Ushio leaves, Sumika notices her blushing as she goes.
9	"Like a Sunflower" "Himawari no Kimi" (ひまわりの君)	December 2, 2009
Azusa gets psyched to prepare a doujin for an upcoming yuri convention, assuming Sumika would help her with it. Ushio decides to distance herself from Azusa so that Norio's secret identity won't be found out. Tomoe plans a trip to the beach for her 'club', tempting Sumika with the thought of Ushio in a swimsuit. Thinking about Sumika, Azusa is inspired to work on an original story as opposed to a doujin, and spends many nights working on it with the hopes of showing Sumika the final result. However, she becomes very depressed when Sumika can't remember offering to help, and runs home to cry. Having noticed her, Tomoe brings Sumika over to Azusa's house so she can see the work Azusa had done and apologize.
10	"A Happening in Summer" "Hapuningu in Samā" (ハプニング・イン・サマー)	December 9, 2009
Sumika ends up working with Azusa to finish her doujin for the yuri convention, hoping to finish in time to join Ushio and the others on their trip to the beach. However, unbeknownst to her, their trip is cut short due to Tomoe wrecking their rented car. As they approach the end of a seemingly endless amount of photocopying, Azusa notices a spelling error. Sumika can't stand leaving it there, so she makes further copies, having to visit several stores to get a working copier. However, when she finally gets back, she trips up and spreads all the copies everywhere, causing Azusa's mother to slip and spill drinks all over them. Noticing how distraught Azusa becomes as a result, Sumika decides to forgo joining the gang and helps her salvage the remaining copies for the convention. To Sumika's surprise, Ushio shows up at the convention to see her and buy a copy of their doujin.
11	"It's Nothing" "Nandemonai" (なんでもない)	December 16, 2009
To make up for missing the beach, Azusa's parents gets everyone tickets to the pool. Ushio decides to keep her distance from Azusa so Norio's secret won't be found out, which annoys Sumika since she's the only one Azusa knows well. Conveniently, Kiyori separates everyone into two groups based on their breast size, putting Sumika with Ushio and Tomoe. Ushio and Tomoe get hit on by some guys, but Sumika scares them off when they show no interest in her figure. Sumika then gets competitive with Tomoe over her swimming ability, but inevitable loses. After recovering on Ushio's lap, she teaches her how to swim. As they do, they are spotted by Azusa, who realises Sumika has feelings for Ushio and wonders if she was just in the way. She does find a little comfort after talking with Tomoe and decides to write a story based on the two.
12	"Did You See the Rain?" "Ame o Mitakai" (雨を見たかい)	December 23, 2009
On a rainy day, the gang discover a hidden note in a book referring to a certain thing, so they decide to search for it. After some investigation they find a key to a locker, but are reluctant to go to the boys' locker room, so Sumika gets Masaki to go for them. The locker contains another note mentioning a German person. With Azusa's help, they make the connection to the pictures of German musicians in the music room. This leads them to the creek (which in German is 'Bach'), eventually finding it to be a prank, but having fun all the while.
13	"Calling You"	December 30, 2009
Sumika goes with her family on a trip to visit graves and an obon festival, promising to call Ushio when she gets there. However, the house they were meant to stay at got damaged in a fire, so they are relocated to a temple on a mountain which, much to Sumika's chagrin, is out of her cell phone's range, meaning she can't contact Ushio. The next day, Sumika is put in charge of looking after some children. While visiting the river, one of the children, Teru, falls off a tree into the river, and Sumika goes to save him, getting her cell phone wet in the process. Meanwhile, Ushio gets concerned that she hasn't heard from Sumika, wondering if she got caught up in an accident or something. Teru apologises to Sumika for causing her trouble and gets grounded. When Sumika's phone starts working again and Ushio calls it, Teru rushes it over to Sumika who is attending a festival and the two finally get to talk to each other.

=== Video game ===
A kissing video game, titled Sasame Kisscomi as an app for the iPhone was released by Team Tachyon. The game rates the player on how well they can kiss, and also offers 27 pages of manga, as well as color images of the anime's art for successful kissing.

== Reception ==
Tim Jones of THEM Anime Reviews said he feared that the series would turn into "another Maria Holic" and said that the first few episodes were frustrating to him, but the perverted thoughts of Sumika were "kept in her head, not expressed out loud". He added that although they do not become a couple, it is shown that Ushio really likes Sumika, a subtle yuri relationship. He praised Tomoe and Miyako, an "openly lesbian couple", saying it is nice to see a "yuri couple in a romantic comedy with some bit of humility". He pointed out that Aoi is "a shy girl who loves yuri" and has a crush on Sumika, and was generally fine with the voice cast. He criticized the series music as "nothing to write home about, said that the visual quality of the show looks fine, and said that the show is "an example of a good show wanting to be great", but dragged down by annoying jokes. He further said the series is "older teenagers and up" because most of the cast are lesbians, along with some fan service, and called an episode where a male character, Masaki, dresses up in drag as one of the "most creepy, unfunny episodes" he had seen in a long time.

Carl Kimlinger of Anime News Network said that after the first episode, the "series goes on as if blindsided by its own longevity", spending most of its time, up to episode six, "drifting", and "rudderless" with antics of Akemiya, a cross-dresser, and two lesbian lovers (Tomoe and Miyako) "acquiring a pretty serious patina of goofiness in the process". He also said that the series is a "couple of steps above your average romantic comedy", having some perverse humor, saying it is blessed by "good...background artistry". Kimlinger says that if the show, after its first episode, "feels like a sequel to its first episode", then it's a fun sequel with characters which are likable, laughs, and more. He concludes that the series is an "enjoyable and often very funny romantic comedy" while he says that the series never lives up to "the promise of that opening episode" and is visually bland.

Megan Gudeman of CBR said that the anime makes Sumika's crush on her friend, Ushio, "comedic", and said that there is enough "yuri representation throughout the cast to be considered a 2000s staple". Em Casalena said the series shows a relationship with themes "you'd find in any teen romance" but it is between "two openly lesbian high school students", with a focus on lesbophobia and being a "young gay student in Japan". Casalena also says that the story is "incredibly relatable" with those girls who are closeted likely finding "parallels between her life" and the events in the series.
