= Rica Takashima =

Japanese manga artist

Rica Takashima/Aozora Art
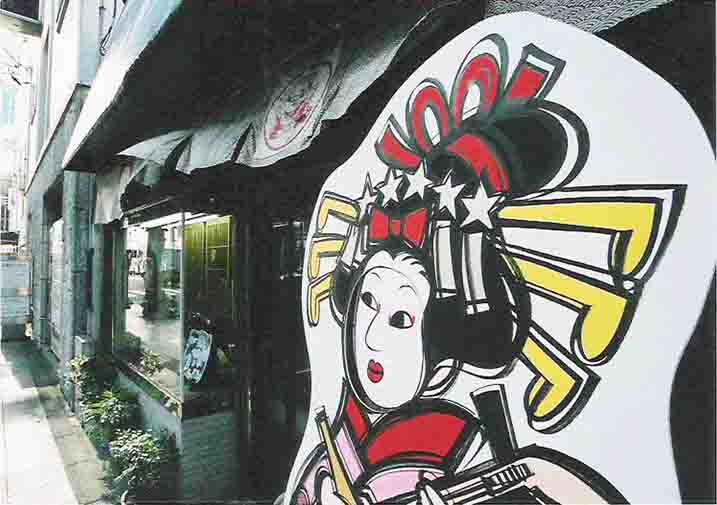
- Aozora Art Peek-a-Boo Board (TM) in Tokyo
- Born: Tokyo, Japan
- Education: Tokyo National University of Fine Arts and Music

Rica Takashima (Japanese: 高嶋 リカ, Hepburn: Takashima Rika) is a prolific pop artist and manga artist who has had exhibitions and shows in museums and galleries in New York City and as well as across Japan.

== Art and career ==
Rica Takashima was born in Shinjuku Tokyo, Japan and lived in Suginami-ward Tokyo. After graduating with a Design Degree from Tokyo University of the Arts, Takashima worked as a stage set artist and a freelance illustrator. In 1994, she founded and launched the avant-garde street art show troupe and studio Aozora Art with using Peekaboo-kun (顔出クンKaodashi-kun), a life-sized sculpture device consisting of a painted piece of board with a cut-out hole for the participants to stick their faces through, on Tokyo's Harajuku Pedestrian Street. Takashima was invited as a guest artist for several pilot art projects in Japan such as: ARCUS PROJECT in 1997, Museum City Project in 1998, Kids Art World Aomori in 2000.

In 1995, Takashima started drawing the semi-autobiographical manga Rica 'tte Kanji!?, which initially ran in Anise, a Japanese magazine for lesbians. Rica 'tte Kanji!? was compiled and released as an English-language graphic novel by ALC Publishing in 2003 and 2012 (as titled TOKYO LOVE Rica ‘tte Kanji!? ), and as an Italian version by RenBooks, Bologna, Italy in 2011. Since 2003, Takashima's four panel Manga strip "GO! NY Journey (進め！NY道 Susume! New York Dou) has appeared in Weekly NY Japion paper (Trend Pot NY LLC). She focused on her family from 2001 to 2011. After Takashima immigrated to the United States, she became a member of International Women's Artists Salon and Women in Comics. Takashima's participatory public art project Aliens in New York has been fiscally sponsored by New York Foundation for the Arts since 2013. Her manga style interactive sculpture El Barrio Comes in All Colors, Shapes and Sizes was set on Randall's Island Park 2015.

== Exhibits ==
- 2012 "Celebrating Women" Fort Lee Public Library, New Jersey
- 2010 "To Tugaru from New York" Aomori Museum of Art, Japan
- 2009 "Instant Gender" New York, New York
- 2008 "Feeling Much Better Through Manga Art" Secaucus, New Jersey
- 2006 "Who Are You?" Tachikawa City, Japan
- 2005 "Peek-A-Boo Meeting" Suginami City, Japan
- 2004-1996 "Happy New Year in Ema" Various venues, Japan
- 2000 "Who is Miura?" Aomori Museum of Art, Japan
- 2000 "Photos of Aozora Art" Moscow, Russia
- 1999 "Order Made Family" Inokashira Park, Japan
