= Kyoto International Manga Museum =

Museum in Kyoto, Japan

- Location within Central Japan
- Established: November 25, 2006
- Location: Kyoto, Japan
- Coordinates: 35°00′42″N 135°45′33″E
- Type: Art museum, Library
- Collections: Comics
- Collection size: 300,000 items (2015)
- Visitors: 290,000 (2016)
- Director: Hiroshi Aramata
- Website: www.kyotomm.jp/en/

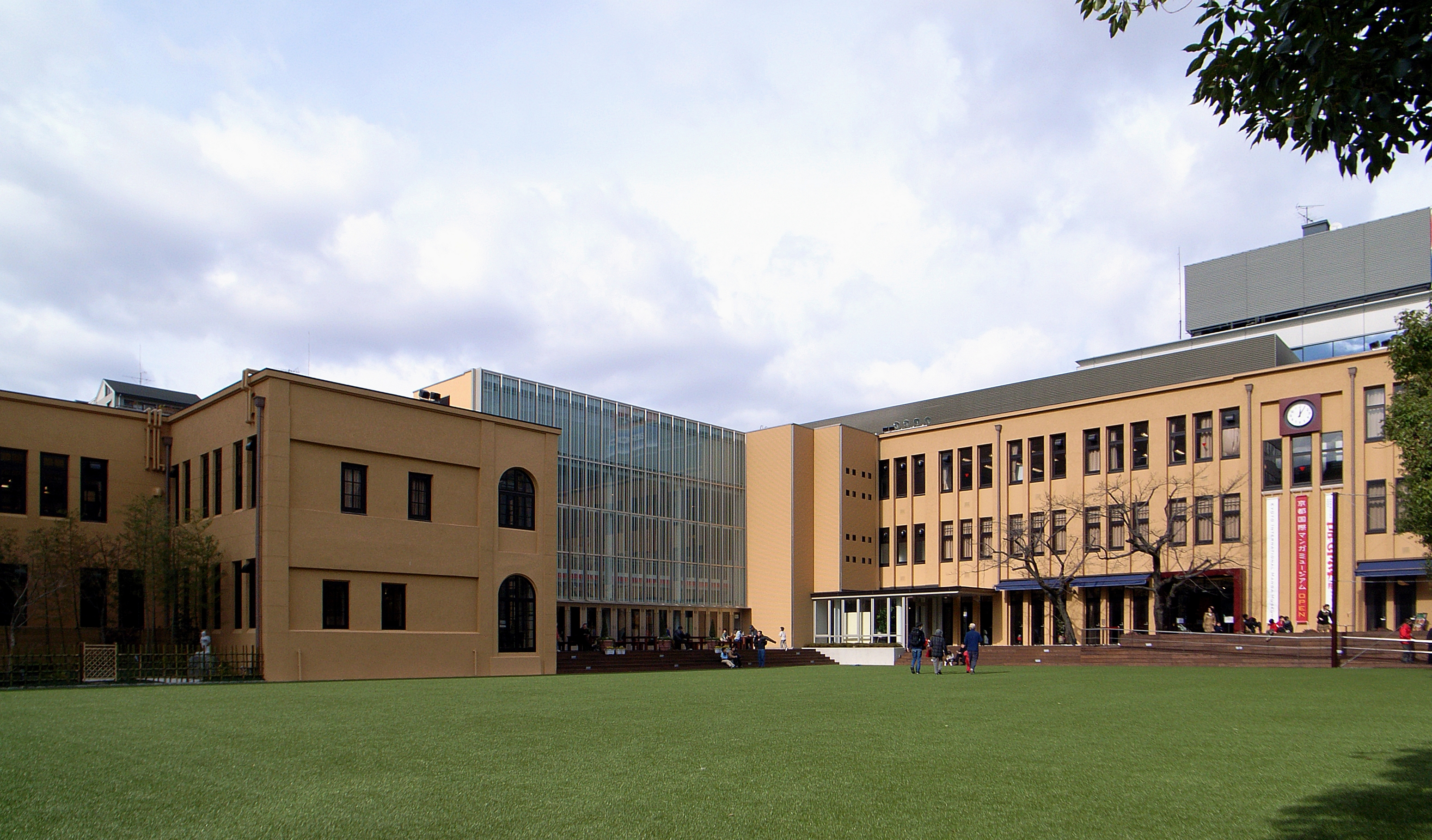
Buildings and grounds of the museum

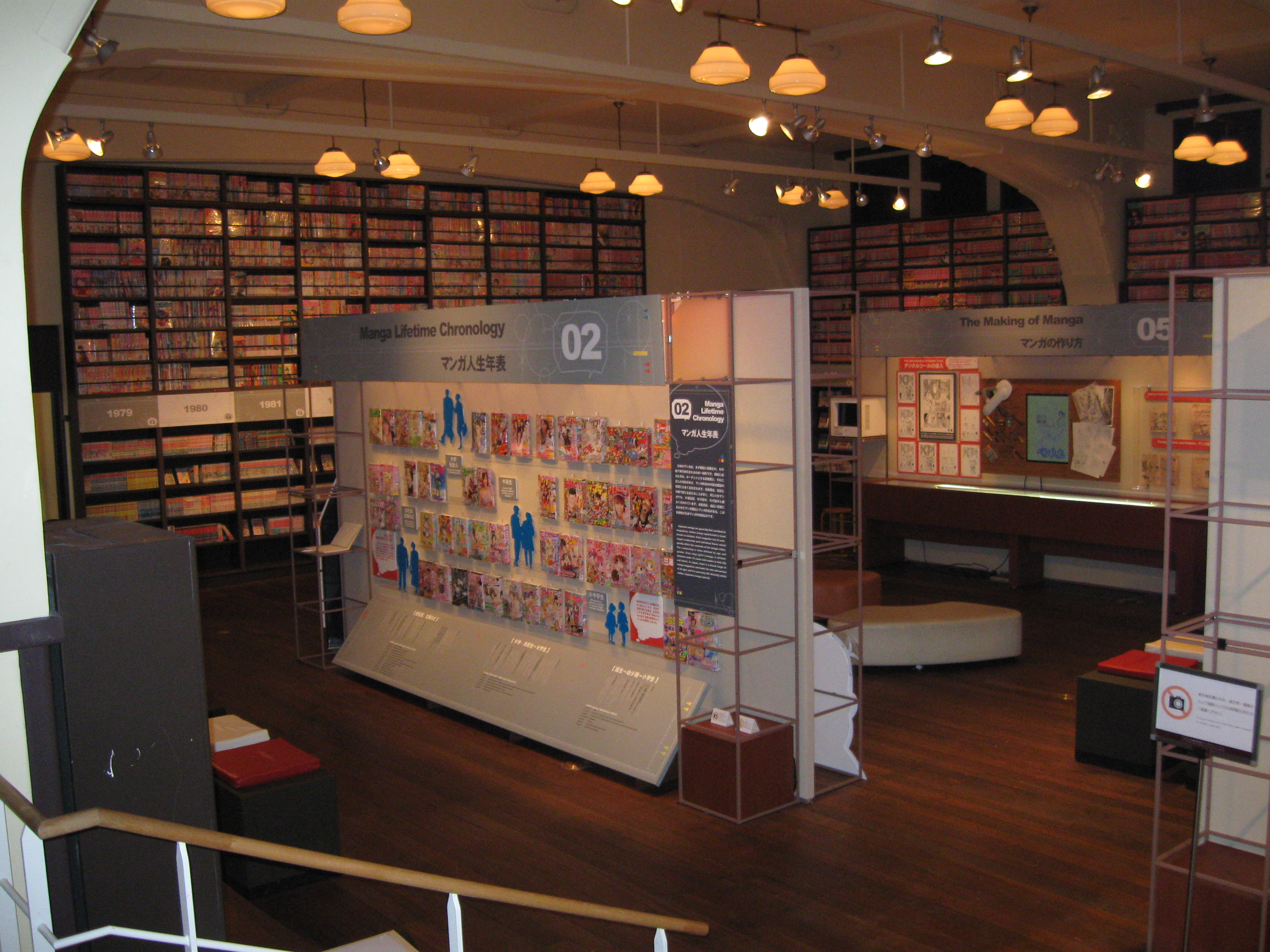
Exhibit

The Kyoto International Manga Museum (京都国際マンガミュージアム, Kyōto Kokusai Manga Myūjiamu) is located in Nakagyō-ku, Kyoto, Japan. The museum's collection includes approximately 300,000 items as of 2016, with 50,000 volumes of manga that can be accessed and read by visitors and approximately 250,000 items in its closed-stack collection, which can be accessed via a dedicated research room supported by reference facilities. Collected materials include Edo period woodblock prints, pre-war magazines, post-war rental books, and popular modern series from around the world.

The museum is a public–private partnership of Kyoto Seika University and the city of Kyoto. The city provided the building and land. The university operates the facility under the oversight of a joint committee. The museum acts as a manga library and history resource for the public, as well as serving the manga-related research interests of Kyoto Seika University's International Manga Research Center.

== History ==
=== Tatsuike Primary School ===
The building that houses the Kyoto International Manga Museum was once Tatsuike Primary School. The English language version of the museum's website provides the following information:

Tatsuike Primary School, which has been converted to the Kyoto International Manga Museum, was opened on November 1, 1869 as the 25th bangumi shogakko (district elementary school) of Kamigyo, one of a total of 64 administrative district-based elementary schools established in Kyoto. This was three years before the modern educational system was established in Japan (proclamation of the Education System Order in 1872). Tatsuike Primary School was built without the aid of grants from the Kyoto prefectural government and only with money (2,000 ryo) donated by residents of Tatsuike School District, who pinned their greatest hopes on education. From the time of its founding, Tatsuike Primary School played a leading role in education in Kyoto. However, due to the doughnut phenomenon (cavitation of downtown) and the decline in number of children in recent years, Tatsuike Primary School was merged with four other schools (Umeya, Chikkan, Fuyu and Kasuga) in April 1995 to form Gosho Minami Primary School. The Manga Museum is made up of three buildings, the main building (built in 1929), the north building (built in 1937), and the auditorium/gymnasium (built in 1928), renovated to form a connecting shape, but otherwise largely untouched, including the creaky corridors and tiled staircases, etc., allowing visitors to savor the beautifully extravagant architectural atmosphere of the Modernist era.

=== Development of the museum ===
The creation of the manga museum was proposed by Kyoto Seika University in April 2003. The project launch was announced by the Mayor of Kyoto City in December 2004 at a press conference. In October 2005, the Committee on the Use of Former Primary School Sites approved use of the former Tatsuike Primary School site for the museum. The museum's name and logo were determined in October 2006, and it opened shortly thereafter in November of the same year.

=== Awards ===
- January 2008: won the "Kansai Genki Bunkaken New Power Prize 2007" from the Agency for Cultural Affairs
- September 2009: won an art and culture prize at "Kyoto Souzousha Taisho 2009"
- May 2012: won the 41st special prize for the Japan Cartoonists Association Award
- May 2016: won a special prize at "The 20th Tezuka Osamu Cultural Prize"

== Facilities ==
The museum is divided into a number of public zones. The Gallery Zone is open to the public and contains both permanent and temporary exhibition rooms. The museum also has a Research Zone, an Archive Zone, and community spaces. There is also a Tatsuike Memorial Room, a gift shop, and a tea room. The Wall of Manga, which visitors may freely access, is the main feature of the museum's collection. It contains approximately 50, 000 publications from the 1970s, most of which were donated from the rental bookstore Okubo Negishi Books. The Wall of Manga is divided by floors: the first floor features shonen manga, the second floor features shojo manga, and the third floor features seinen manga. There is also a children's library that includes approximately 3,000 picture books.

== Exhibitions and events ==
The museum features several permanent exhibits outside of its manga collection. These include a room of plaster casts of the hands of manga and anime artists who have visited the museum, an exhibition of 100 maiko illustrations by various artists, a hanging sculpture of Tezuka Osamu's Hi no Tori character, and an exhibition called "What is Manga?" that features influential manga published between 1912 and 2005. There is also a room dedicated to kamishibai, a traditional Japanese storytelling format that uses a combination of characterful narration and hand-drawn paper cards.

Regularly held events include kamishibai performances that occur throughout the week, a manga studio event in which visitors can watch manga artists at work and pay for consultation on their own drawing skills, and a portrait corner where visitors can have their portrait drawn by manga artists.

== Operations ==
The Kyoto International Manga Museum is open from 10:00 a.m. to 6:00 p.m. Guests may enter until 5:30 p.m. It is open daily except Wednesdays (if Wednesday is a holiday, the closure moves to Thursday). It closes at the end of the year and remains closed until after the New Year holidays. The admission fee is 900 yen for adults, 400 yen for high school and junior high school students, and 200 yen for elementary students and younger, with discounts for large groups. Special exhibitions within the museum may carry additional admission fees.

== Access ==
The nearest station is Karasuma Oike on the Karasuma and Tōzai Lines of the Kyoto Municipal Subway. Karasuma Oike is the closest bus stop. The museum has a bicycle parking lot with a capacity for approximately 80 bikes or small motorcycles. There is no space for visiting cars to park, but there are metered parking lots nearby.

== One millionth visitor ==
Liana Smale was the one millionth visitor to the Kyoto International Manga Museum on August 26, 2010. To celebrate this milestone, she was given a commemorative gift by "Mamyu," the museum's mascot. The 12-year-old Los Angeles native was visiting Japan with her family. In an interview, Smale said she and her friends were big manga fans.
