= Yuricon =

US yuri anime convention

- Status: Defunct
- Venue: Hilton Newark Penn Station
- Locations: Newark, New Jersey
- Country: United States
- Inaugurated: 2003
- Most recent: 2007
- Attendance: 200 in 2003
- Organizer: Erica Friedman
- Website: www.yuricon.org

Yuricon was an anime convention geared toward fans of yuri anime and manga. The first Yuricon event was held in 2003 in Newark, New Jersey with about 200 attending, although Yuricon has existed as an online entity since 2000. The event was organized by Yuricon, LLC., which continues to run Yuri-focused events of its own, collaborates with other organizations to hold unique events, and hosts contests.

== History ==
In 2000, Erica Friedman founded Yuricon on Usenet with the name of "Anilesbocon" but this was changed to Yuricon in 2003 in an effort to better "celebrate Yuri in anime and manga." In 2003, the organization had a "three-day anime and manga convention" in Newark, New Jersey. Two years later, Yuricon hosted an event in Tokyo and co-sponsored Onna!, together with the Shoujo Arts Society, which focused on women's roles in animation and comics. Two years after that, in 2007, Yuricon ran a small one-day event, named Yurisai, to recreate the feel of the Tokyo event from 2005. During this time period, Yuricon hosted several panels, cosplay events, anime music video contests, and other competitions, while Yuricon maintained a library of yuri manga for attendees to read.

Some years later, in 2011, Yuricon moved to a new website. The same year, the Kyoto International Manga Museum added works published by ALC Publishing, the publishing arm of Yuricon, into its permanent collection. Also that year, Renbooks, an Italian publisher announced that an Italian edition of Rica 'tte Kanji!? would be published. The following year, ALC Publishing announced a partnership with JManga to publish POOR POOR LIPS!, Kimi no Tamenara Shineru, and three other yuri comic titles. The next year, Okazu, then just a blog of Friedman, joined the domain of Yuricon and ALC publishing stopped publishing new material.

In later years, the webpage of the Yuricon website as a whole was improved, while the group's founder, Erica Friedman, asked for donations to ensure that Yuricon and Okazu are "on the cutting edge of Yuri Culture." Later, the new-and-improved Yuricon store would be opened and the page listing yuri essays would be improved. Then, in May 2018, Friedman appeared at a guest panelist at AnimeNEXT in Atlantic City, NJ. The following year, Yuricon joined forces with PacSet to launch a guided trip across Japan "dedicated to the Yuri genre of Japanese animation and manga," which would take place in September of that year. The same year, Erica Friedman appeared at the Toronto Comic Arts Festival to celebrate 100 years of Yuri, while speaking at various other events that year.

In May 2020, Yuricon hosted an online panel about yuri.

=== Event history ===
Dates	Location	Atten.	Guests
June 13–15, 2003	Gateway Hilton; Newark, New Jersey	200	Dr. Sarah Frederick, Gaijin-a-gogo, Michelle Hayes, Eriko Tadeno, Rica Takashima, and Kathryn Williams.
April 16, 2005	A/Z Books & Cafe; Tokyo, Japan	30	Akiko Mizoguchi, Natsuko Mori, Eriko Tadeno, and Rica Takashima.
September 29, 2007	Hilton Newark Penn Station; Newark, New Jersey		Rica Takashima.

== Publishing and outreach ==
Yuricon has a publishing arm, ALC Publishing, the only all-yuri publisher in the world. Publications include translations from the Japanese—such as Rica 'tte Kanji!? and WORKS—as well as the original English-language anthology series Yuri Monogatari.

Friedman has run guest lectures about yuri at the University of Illinois at Urbana-Champaign, MIT, Kanagawa University, International Christian University, and University of Michigan, Ann Arbor.

Additionally, Friedman has run a blog titled Okazu since 2002, which she describes as the "world's oldest and most comprehensive blog which focuses on lesbian themes in Japanese comics, cartoons, and other media." Yuricon also describes Okazu as their "official" blog. In 2022 essays written for Okazu, including those detailing the history of Yuricon and ALC Publishing, were published alongside Friedman's other works within By Your Side: The First 100 Years of Yuri Anime and Manga.

=== Publications ===
- Yuri Monogatari (named for Nobuko Yoshiya's Hana Monogatari) is an annual anthology of yuri-themed short comics. In September 2007, Yuri Monogatari 3 was nominated for the Lambda Book Award. Five Yuri Monogatari anthologies have been published, with volumes 4 and 6 currently listed in the Yuricon store. Caroline Ryder of The Advocate called Yuri Monogatari a "must-have manga".
- Shoujoai ni Bouken
- Rica 'tte Kanji!?
- WORKS
