= Pon no Michi =

Japanese anime television series

- Anime key visual

ぽんのみち
- Genre: Sports (mahjong)
- Created by: IIS-P
- Manga
- Written by: IIS-P
- Illustrated by: Tsukasa Unohana
- Published by: Kodansha
- Magazine: Nakayoshi
- Original run: September 1, 2023 – March 1, 2024
- Volumes: 1
- Anime television series
- Directed by: Tatsuma Minamikawa
- Written by: Tatsuma Minamikawa
- Music by: Sachiko Takahashi; Takuma Sogi; hisakuni; Riko Ohashi; Kanji Eguchi; Shari
- Studio: OLM Team Inoue
- Licensed by: Animation Digital Network (streaming): SEA: Remow
- Original network: MBS, TBS, BS-TBS, RCC, AT-X
- Original run: January 6, 2024 – March 23, 2024
- Episodes: 12
- Manga

Pon no Michi: Ryūkyoku Shānyū-hen
- Written by: Jun Endō
- Published by: Kodansha
- Magazine: YanMaga Web
- Original run: January 8, 2024 – April 22, 2024
- Volumes: 1

Pon no Michi (ぽんのみち; lit. "The Way to a pung") is a Japanese original anime television series created by IIS-P and animated by OLM. It aired from January to March 2024. A manga adaptation by Tsukasa Unohana was serialized in Kodansha's shōjo manga magazine Nakayoshi from September 2023 to March 2024.

== Plot ==
Nashiko Jippensha is a high school student from Onomichi who has been kicked out of her house. Having no place to go where she can hang out with her friends, she soon discovers that her father has left behind a vacant mahjong parlor he used to own. As such, Nashiko cleans up the parlor and turns it into her personal hangout.

== Characters ==
Nashiko Jippensha (十返舎 なしこ, Jippensha Nashiko)
Voiced by: Kaori Maeda
Nashiko is the daughter of a former mahjong parlor owner. Although the parlor has since closed down, she comes to live there after being kicked out of the family home. She is initially a beginner at mahjong but becomes interested in it. She speaks in a Hiroshima dialect and has a liking for unusual food combinations.
Pai Kawahigashi (河東 ぱい, Kawahigashi Pai)
Voiced by: Iori Saeki
Pai is a friend of Nashiko's who knows the basics of mahjong. She has a kind personality. Her name is a reference to how she was born on August 1.
Izumi Tokutomi (徳富 泉, Tokutomi Izumi)
Voiced by: Shion Wakayama
Izumi is a friend of Nashiko's who is the most knowledgeable about mahjong among herself, Nashiko, and Pai due to her playing it at family gatherings.
Riche Hayashi (林 リーチェ, Hayashi Rīche)
Voiced by: Yui Kondo
Riche is a young girl who regularly hung out at the parlor thanks to her parents. She becomes friends with everyone once she finds out Nashiko is using the parlor. She comes from a wealthy family and has her own maids.
Chonbo (チョンボ)
Voiced by: Akio Otsuka
Chonbo is a mahjong spirit who takes the form of a sparrow. Nashiko is the only one who can actually hear him.
Haneru Emi (江見 跳, Emi Haneru)
Voiced by: Hibiku Yamamura
Haneru is a young girl from Hiroshima who becomes friends with everyone after they play a game of mahjong online.

== Media ==
=== Manga ===
A manga adaptation illustrated by Tsukasa Unohana was serialized in Kodansha's shōjo manga magazine Nakayoshi from September 1, 2023, to March 1, 2024. Its seven chapters were collected in a single tankōbon volume released on January 12, 2024.

A "self-proclaimed unofficial" official spin-off manga series by Jun Endō, titled Pon no Michi: Ryūkyoku Shānyū-hen (ぽんのみち 流局西入編), was serialized on Kodansha's YanMaga Web website and app from January 8 to April 22, 2024.

==== Volumes ====
===== Pon no Michi =====
No.	Japanese release date	Japanese ISBN
1	January 12, 2024	978-4-06-534157-5

===== Pon no Michi: Ryūkyoku Shānyū-hen =====
No.	Japanese release date	Japanese ISBN
1	June 19, 2024	978-4-06-534157-5

=== Anime ===
The original anime television series by OLM was announced on May 23, 2023. It is an original work by IIS-P, and features direction and series composition by Tatsuma Minamikawa, original character designs by Negi Haruba, animation character designs by Kenji Ota, and music composed by Sachiko Takahashi, Takuma Sogi, hisakuni, Riko Ohashi, Kanji Eguchi, and Shari. The series aired from January 6 to March 23, 2024, on the Animeism programming block on all JNN affiliates, including MBS, TBS, and BS-TBS. (Note: MBS and TBS listed the series premiere on January 5, 2024 at 25:53, which is effectively January 6 at 1:53 a.m. JST.) The opening theme song is "Ponpopopon" (ポンポポポン), performed by Kana Nakada feat. Pon no Michi All Stars (a unit composed of the voice actors of the anime), while the ending theme song is "Good Luck Waker", performed by Halca.

Animation Digital Network is streaming the series on YouTube outside of Asia. Hidive began streaming it on January 30, 2026. (Note: Despite this, Sentai Filmworks never licensed the anime, making this one of the few non-Sentai anime to stream on Hidive.) Remow licensed the series in Asia-Pacific.

==== Episodes ====
No.	Title	Original release date
1	"Nashiko's First Pass"; Transliteration: "Mājan o Yaru Shikana Nashiko-chan" (Japanese: 麻雀をやるしかなしこちゃん)	January 6, 2024
2	"Four Players Gathered"; Transliteration: "Yonin Sorotta" (Japanese: 4人揃った)	January 13, 2024
3	"Let's Eat"; Transliteration: "Gohan o Tabeyou" (Japanese: ご飯を食べよう)	January 20, 2024
4	"I'm Running Out of Gigs!"; Transliteration: "Giga ga Heru!" (Japanese: ギガが減る！)	January 27, 2024 (Note: This episode aired at 2:08 a.m. JST, 15 minutes after the original air time on MBS/TBS.)
5	"She's Here!"; Transliteration: "Yatsu ga Kita!" (Japanese: 奴がきた！)	February 3, 2024
6	"Training Camp!"; Transliteration: "Gasshuku!" (Japanese: 合宿！)	February 10, 2024
7	"August One Is for Pai"; Transliteration: "Hachigatsu Tsuitachi (Pai no Hidesu)" (Japanese: 8月1日（ぱいの日です）)	February 17, 2024
8	"Turn on the Light"; Transliteration: "Akari o Tsukemashou" (Japanese: あかりをつけましょう)	February 24, 2024
9	"Let's Betcha!"; Transliteration: "Rettsu Betcha" (Japanese: れっつべっちゃー)	March 2, 2024
10	"Merry Christmas to Everyone!"; Transliteration: "Min'na no Merii Kurisumasu!" (Japanese: みんなのメニークリスマス!)	March 9, 2024
11	"Happy New Year!"; Transliteration: "Akeome!" (Japanese: あけおめ!)	March 16, 2024
12	"The Daughters of the Mahjong Table"; Transliteration: "Jantaku no Musumetachi" (Japanese: 雀卓の娘たち)	March 23, 2024
