= Iori Saeki =

Japanese singer (born 1994)

- 佐伯 伊織
- Born: July 22, 1994 (age 32); Kanagawa Prefecture, Japan
- Other name: NU-KO
- Occupations: Singer; voice actress
- Years active: 2012–present
- Agent: Swallow
- Notable work: Umamusume: Pretty Derby as King Halo; Oresuki as Kimie Kamata; Nekopara as Vanilla; Lapis Re:Lights as Ashley; Adachi and Shimamura as Yashiro Chikama
- Height: 153 cm (5 ft 0 in)

Iori Saeki (佐伯 伊織, Saeki Iori; born July 22, 1994), also known by the stage name NU-KO, is a Japanese singer and voice actress affiliated with Swallow. Beginning her activities as a dōjin (self-published) musician in 2012, she began voice acting activities in 2018. She is known for her roles as King Halo in Umamusume: Pretty Derby, Kimie "Tanpopo" Kamata in Oresuki, Vanilla in Nekopara, Ashley in Lapis Re:Lights, and Yashiro Chikama in Adachi and Shimamura.

== Biography ==
Saeki was born in Kanagawa Prefecture on July 22, 1994. She grew up in a family that was fond of playing video games such as a fighting game in the Saint Seiya series. While in elementary school, she became interested in anime after watching the series Neon Genesis Evangelion and developing a fondness for the character Shinji Ikari and his voice actor Megumi Ogata. She also became a fan of Nana Mizuki, and was impressed by how Mizuki was able to find success both as a singer and as a voice actress. Although she initially wanted to pursue a career in voice acting, she decided to start out as a singer instead.

In 2012, Saeki learned of an audition to perform songs for the arcade game series Pop'n Music. Under the name NU-KO, she applied for the audition, and after passing, performed the song "Ren'ai Kansoku" (恋愛観測) for the series. She would continue singing songs for Pop'n Music, including "Katate Dokusho" (カタテ読書), "Aka to Ao no Rampage" (朱と碧のランページ), and "Sing a Song Sigh". She would also release several more dōjin songs under the NU-KO alias.

In 2017, Saeki began a voice acting career, and trained at a school run by the talent agency Swallow. After training, she became affiliated with Swallow in 2018 and made her voice acting debut as a maid in the anime television series Ms. Koizumi Loves Ramen Noodles. She was then cast as King Halo in the multimedia franchise Umamusume: Pretty Derby. Later that year, she was cast as the characters Maiko Kurashiki in the mobile game Hachigatsu no Cinderella Nine and Mitsuki Gero in the mixed-media project Onsen Musume, replacing Yurika Endō who had announced her retirement from voice acting. In 2019, she reprised the role of Maiko for the anime television series adaptation of Hachigatsu no Cinderella Nine, and played the role of Kimie "Tanpopo" Kamata in Oresuki. In 2020, she played the role of Vanilla in Nekopara, played the role of Kozue Kasugai in Rebirth, reprised the role of Ashley for the anime television series adaptation of Lapis Re:Lights, and played the role of Yashiro Chikama in Adachi and Shimamura. In 2021, she played the role of Kei Ayamine in Muv-Luv Alternative. In 2022, she played the role of Menou in The Executioner and Her Way of Life, and played the role of Moe Yanagida in Tokyo Mew Mew New.

== Filmography ==
=== Anime ===
2018

- Ms. Koizumi Loves Ramen Noodles as Maid
- Umamusume: Pretty Derby as King Halo
- Revue Starlight as Hinano Kyōmoto (episode 1), Marina Banbaen (episode 2), Classmate, Child, Costume B

2019

- Hachigatsu no Cinderella Nine as Maiko Kurashiki
- Gifu no Taketayo as Gero Kaeru Noyatarou
- Z/X Code reunion as Honome Chōgasaki
- Oresuki as Kimie "Tampopo" Kamata

2020

- Nekopara as Vanilla
- Rebirth as Kozue Kasugai
- Lapis Re:Lights as Ashley
- Muhyo & Roji's Bureau of Supernatural Investigation Season 2 as Boy
- Umayon as King Halo
- Adachi and Shimamura as Yashiro Chikama
- Assault Lily Bouquet as Hiromu Sejima

2021

- The Quintessential Quintuplets ∬ as Tsubaki
- SSSS.Dynazenon as Kano Minami
- Fairy Ranmaru as Schoolgirl 2, Fan 2, Idol B, Schoolchild, Tina Musuko
- Blue Reflection Ray as Yukiko Takaoka
- Dragon Goes House-Hunting as Receptionist
- How a Realist Hero Rebuilt the Kingdom as Julia
- Muv-Luv Alternative as Kei Ayamine

2022

- Akebi's Sailor Uniform as Mika
- Cue! as Recording Assistant
- The Executioner and Her Way of Life as Menou
- Tokyo Mew Mew New as Moe Yanagida

2023

- The Iceblade Sorcerer Shall Rule the World as Amelia Rose
- The Tale of the Outcasts as Vivian
- The Dreaming Boy Is a Realist as Mina Ichinose

2024

- Pon no Michi as Pai Kawahigashi

2025

- Aharen-san Is Indecipherable 2nd Season as Henzan-sensei
- The Shy Hero and the Assassin Princesses as Ciel Zebul
- A Mangaka's Weirdly Wonderful Workplace as Shiori Asakura
- Blue Orchestra as Rika Tōgane

2026

- Noble Reincarnation: Born Blessed, So I'll Obtain Ultimate Power as Shirley Grantz
- An Observation Log of My Fiancée Who Calls Herself a Villainess as Silica Lunea
- Tetsuryō! Meet with Tetsudō Musume as Azami Takashima

2027

- Maiden Blood as Eva
- The Moon on a Rainy Night as Saki Kindaichi

=== Video games ===
2015

- Otocadoll as Nyandora

2018

- Hachigatsu no Cinderella Nine as Maiko Kurashiki
- Gothic wa Mahou Otome as Mitoca
- Shōjo Kageki Revue Starlight -Re LIVE- as Yuyuko Tanaka
- Megido 72 as Baphomet

2021

- Umamusume: Pretty Derby as King Halo

2022

- GrimGrimoire OnceMore as Lillet Blan

2023

- TEVI as Jezbelle, Serulea
- Azur Lane as Constellation

TBA

- Lapis Re:Lights as Ashley

=== Others ===
2023

- CoeStation as Hasuki Nemu

2024

- Project:;Cold as Misato Kazahari

=== Dubbing ===
- Mercy as Britt Raven (Kylie Rogers)
