= Eisei Otome no Tatakai-kata =

Japanese manga series

- First tankōbon volume cover

永世乙女の戦い方
- Genre: Sports (shogi)
- Manga
- Written by: Kuzushiro; Manao Kagawa (supervision)
- Illustrated by: Kuzushiro
- Published by: Shogakukan
- Imprint: Big Superior Comics
- Magazine: Big Comic Superior
- Original run: April 26, 2019 – present
- Volumes: 15

Eisei Otome no Tatakai-kata (永世乙女の戦い方; "How to Fight for the Lifetime Girl's Grandmaster") is a Japanese manga series written and illustrated by Kuzushiro and supervised by Manao Kagawa. It began serialization in Shogakukan's seinen manga magazine Big Comic Superior in April 2019.

== Publication ==
Written and illustrated by Kuzushiro and supervised by Manao Kagawa, Eisei Otome no Tatakai-kata began serialization in Shogakukan's seinen manga magazine Big Comic Superior on April 26, 2019. Its chapters have been compiled into fifteen tankōbon volumes as of June 2026.

No.	Release date	ISBN
1	September 30, 2019	978-4-09-860400-5
2	February 28, 2020	978-4-09-860551-4
3	July 30, 2020	978-4-09-860684-9
4	January 29, 2021	978-4-09-860841-6
5	June 30, 2021	978-4-09-861067-9
6	November 30, 2021	978-4-09-861191-1
7	May 30, 2022	978-4-09-861342-7
8	December 28, 2022	978-4-09-861490-5
9	June 29, 2023	978-4-09-861730-2
10	December 27, 2023	978-4-09-862627-4
11	July 30, 2024	978-4-09-862781-3
12	January 30, 2025	978-4-09-863180-3
13	July 30, 2025	978-4-09-863522-1
14	January 30, 2026	978-4-09-863764-5
15	June 30, 2026	978-4-09-864053-9
