= Fuyutsuki =

Fuyutsuki may refer to:

- Kozo Fuyutsuki, an animation character in Neon Genesis Evangelion
- Azusa Fuyutsuki, an animation character in Great Teacher Onizuka
- Koharu Fuyutsuki, a character in Love Unseen Beneath the Clear Night Sky
- Japanese destroyer Fuyutsuki, a destroyer of the 1942 Akizuki class of the Imperial Japanese Navy during World War II
- JDS Fuyuzuki (DD-118), a destroyer of the 2010 Akizuki class of the Japanese Maritime Self-Defense Force
