= Voil (studio) =

Japanese animation studio

Voil Inc.
- Native name: 株式会社Voil
- Romanized name: Kabushiki-gaisha Voil
- Type: Kabushiki-gaisha
- Industry: Japanese animation
- Founded: March 2022; 4 years ago
- Founder: Katsuki Ōtaka
- Headquarters: Chūō, Nakano, Tokyo, Japan
- Key people: Katsuki Ōtaka (CEO)
- Website: studio-voil.com

Voil (Japanese: 株式会社Voil, Hepburn: Kabushiki-gaisha Voil) is a Japanese animation studio based in Nakano, Tokyo founded in 2022 by former Manglobe and Geno Studio producer Katsuki Ōtaka.

== Works ==
=== Television series ===
| Title | Director(s) | First run start date | First run end date | Eps | Note(s) | Ref(s) |
|---|---|---|---|---|---|---|
| Acro Trip | Ayumu Kotake | October 2, 2024 | December 18, 2024 | 12 | Based on a manga by Yone Sawata. | |
| A Mangaka's Weirdly Wonderful Workplace | Kaoru Suzuki | October 6, 2025 | December 29, 2025 | 13 | Based on a manga by Kuzushiro. | |
| Even a Replica Can Fall in Love | Ryuichi Kimura | April 7, 2026 | TBA | TBA | Based on a light novel by Harunadon. | |
| Destiny Unchain Online | Kōichi Hatsumi | 2027 | TBA | TBA | Based on a light novel by Resn. | |
