= The Moon on a Rainy Night =

Japanese manga series

- First tankōbon volume cover, featuring Kanon (left) and Saki (right)

雨夜の月 (Amayo no Tsuki)
- Genre: Yuri; Romance
- Manga
- Written by: Kuzushiro
- Published by: Kodansha
- English publisher: NA: Kodansha USA
- Imprint: Young Magazine KC Special
- Magazine: Comic Days
- Original run: June 12, 2021 – present
- Volumes: 12
- Anime television series
- Directed by: Tomoe Makino
- Written by: Shōgo Yasukawa
- Music by: Jizue
- Studio: CompTown
- Licensed by: Remow
- Original run: 2027 – scheduled
- icon

The Moon on a Rainy Night (Japanese: 雨夜の月, Hepburn: Amayo no Tsuki) is a Japanese manga series written and illustrated by Kuzushiro. It began serialization on Kodansha's Comic Days manga website in June 2021 and has been collected in twelve tankōbon volumes. The series follows Saki, a cheerful first-year high school student, as she gradually bonds with Kanon, a classmate who has hearing loss and is reluctant to approach others. An anime television series adaptation produced by CompTown is set to premiere in 2027.

Kuzushiro created the story around the theme of things that could not be seen, which is reflected in both Kanon's disability and the work's title. As she wrote the series, she consulted reference works about hearing disabilities and sought to avoid defining Kanon's identity through her condition, instead portraying her as a fully realized character. Meanwhile, Saki's character and personality were chosen after Kuzushiro and her editor decided that portraying a relationship between girls would support the story's emotional themes.

The series has been well received. It was nominated twice for the Next Manga Awards and selected by the American Library Association for its 2025 Rainbow Book List. Critics have praised the series' story, characters, and artwork, with its disability representation and approach to real-world issues garnering particular approval.

== Synopsis ==
While walking to a piano lesson on a rainy night, Saki Kindaichi falls and scrapes her hand after bumping into a girl her age. The girl picks up Saki's sheet music, gives her a bandage, and then silently leaves despite Saki's attempts to make conversation. The following day, as Saki begins attending high school, she reunites with the girl, Kanon Oikawa, and learns that she is hard of hearing.

Initially, Kanon distances herself from her classmates because she does not want to be treated differently for her disability. She rebuffs Saki when she tries reaching out, but after school, Saki runs through the rain to grab an umbrella for Kanon, leading Kanon to slowly start accepting her. As the two grow closer, Saki helps Kanon open up to others while wrestling with romantic feelings for her new friend.

== Characters ==
Saki Kindaichi (金田一 咲希, Kindaichi Saki)
Voiced by: Iori Saeki
A first-year high school student who has been playing the piano since she was a child. She is struck by Kanon's beauty the first time they meet, and resolves to approach her despite Kanon's taciturnity. While she wants to understand Kanon better, she tends not to share much about herself and is afraid of Kanon finding out she has feelings for her.
Kanon Oikawa (及川 奏音, Oikawa Kanon)
Voiced by: Sora Amamiya
A first-year high school student who sits next to Saki in class. She has sensorineural hearing loss and wears a hearing aid. She grew up loving music and playing the piano, but gave up playing when her hearing loss started in fifth grade. She prefers to keep her distance from others because she fears that they will judge or abandon her, but gradually comes to accept Saki.
Rinne Oikawa (及川 凛音, Oikawa Rinne)
Kanon's younger sister. She is initially suspicious of Saki's motives for befriending Kanon due to bad experiences that her sister has suffered in the past. After seeing how much Saki genuinely cares for Kanon, she becomes warmer towards her.
Erika Tomita (富田 瑛里華, Tomita Erika)
A classmate of Saki. Although she and Kanon were on bad terms in the past, they reconcile when Tomita reaches out after experiencing sudden hearing loss and the two are able to sympathize with each other.
Ayano Izumi (泉 綾乃, Izumi Ayano)
A childhood friend of Kanon. She ended their friendship on bad terms when pressures from her own home life caused her to resent the attention and aid Kanon received. After talking with Kanon years later and explaining her circumstances, the two return to being on good terms again.
Takashi Tanabe (田辺 尚, Tanabe Takashi)
An energetic member of the literature club. She is initially intimidated by the idea of speaking with Kanon due to her beauty and for fear of saying something insensitive, but is encouraged by Saki to reach out anyway. She enjoys reading light novels and posts her own writing online.
Sōma Miura (三浦 壮真, Miura Sōma)
The Japanese literature teacher and advisor to the literature club. He is a recent widower, who is raising his young daughter as a single parent, and often offers advice to Saki and Kanon.

== Production ==
Kuzushiro became interested in finding out more about hearing loss after seeing an announcement that Hinata Kashiwagi, her favorite member of an idol group that she liked, had developed sudden hearing loss and needed to take a break from activities. She researched the condition and realized that it was more complex than she had thought, which influenced her decision to address it in her story. Years later, Kuzushiro and her editor decided to create a work with the theme of things that could not be seen, which was reflected through Kanon's hearing disability, a condition they felt is difficult for others to fully understand. The title of The Moon on a Rainy Night was chosen to reflect this idea of what remained invisible, as was the first volume's narrative, which Kuzushiro structured so that certain aspects of the plot would only become apparent upon rereading the story.

The series underwent significant changes during development. Kuzushiro initially considered making the story a heterosexual romance between two childhood friends. However, as she and her editor discussed the premise, they felt that just as Kanon's hearing loss was not immediately obvious to others, the person romantically interested in Kanon should have motivations to protect her that were also not clearly apparent. As such, they decided that a relationship between girls would better convey the story's emotional themes. From there, the story's focus shifted to one where Kanon and Saki would meet each other as high schoolers and gradually bond.

As Kuzushiro created the series, she consulted specialist reference works about hearing disabilities. She sought to avoid portraying Kanon's identity as defined solely by her condition, instead depicting her as an ordinary girl who acts her age and shows corresponding excitement and immaturity at times. Similarly, Kuzushiro's editor described the story as being about coming-of-age and youth, citing a particular scene where Kanon tells her teacher that she would rather sit with the girl that she likes than where her hearing difficulties would least affect her. However, despite the protagonists' youth, Kuzushiro aimed for the story to explore issues that people face throughout their lives.

== Media ==
=== Manga ===
Written and illustrated by Kuzushiro, The Moon on a Rainy Night has been serialized on Kodansha's Comic Days manga website since June 12, 2021. Kodansha published the first tankōbon volume of the series' collected chapters on October 20, 2021. As of July 2026, twelve tankōbon volumes have been released.

During its Anime NYC 2022 panel, Kodansha USA announced that it had licensed the manga for release in the third quarter of 2023. The first English-language volume was published on September 5, 2023. As of July 2026, eight English-language volumes have been released.

==== Volumes ====
No.	Original release date	Original ISBN	English release date	English ISBN
1	October 20, 2021	978-4-06-525089-1	September 5, 2023	978-1-64-651941-5
1. "Kanon & Saki" (奏音と咲希, Kanon to saki); 2. "Key" (鍵, Kagi); 3. "Refuge" (聖域, Seiiki); 4. "Wish" (願い, Negai)
2	March 18, 2022	978-4-06-527114-8	November 7, 2023	978-1-64-651942-2
5. "An Understanding" (領会, Ryōkai); 6. "'Getting' It" (理解者, Rikaisha); 7. "Interloper" (邪魔者, Jamasha); 8. "Inequality" (不平等, Fubyōdō)
3	September 20, 2022	978-4-06-529121-4	February 6, 2024	978-1-64-651943-9
9. "Too Much to Ask" (贅沢, Zeitaku); 10. "Hurdle" (ハードル, Hādoru); 11. "Future" (将来, Shōrai); 12. "Remorse" (悔悟, Kaigo)
4	March 20, 2023	978-4-06-531077-9	March 26, 2024	979-8-88-877071-9
13. "Burst" (決壊, Kekkai); 14. "Challenge" (挑戦, Chōsen); 15. "Striking a Chord" (共鳴, Kyōmei); 16. "In Step" (絶対, Zettai)
5	August 18, 2023	978-4-06-532694-7	June 11, 2024	979-8-88-877235-5
17. "Yearning" (憧憬, Dōkei); 18. "Sentiment" (気色, Kishoku); 19. "Heart to Heart" (相見, Aimi); 20. "Admission" (告白, Kokuhaku)
6	January 18, 2024	978-4-06-534312-8	December 17, 2024	979-8-88-877311-6
21. "Promise" (約束, Yakusoku); 22. "Doubt" (疑問, Gimon); 23. "Transformation" (変化, Henka); 24. "Touch" (接触, Sesshoku); Tidbits: "Daily Life" (日常, Nichijou)
7	June 19, 2024	978-4-06-535922-8	October 21, 2025	979-8-88-877460-1
25. "Ripples" (波及, Hakyū); 26. "Anxiety" (不安, Fuan); 27. "Confusion" (戸惑, Tomadoi); 28. "Harmony" (調和, Chōwa)
8	November 20, 2024	978-4-06-537613-3	December 23, 2025	979-8-88-877582-0
29. "Honest" (素直, Sunao); 30. "Important" (大事, Daiji); 31. "Introspection" (内省, Naisei); 32. "Unknown" (未知, Michi); Tidbits: "Daily Life" (茶飯事, Sahanji)
9	April 18, 2025	978-4-06-539241-6	December 8, 2026	979-8-88-877683-4
33. 緊張 (Kinchō); 34. 気合 (Kiai); 35. 相性 (Aishō); 36. 不思議 (Fushigi)
10	September 19, 2025	978-4-06-540969-5	—	—
37. 相応 (Sōō); 38. 向後 (Kōgo); 39. 右隣 (Migidonari); 40. 真剣 (Shinken)
11	January 20, 2026	978-4-06-542154-3	—	—
41. 勇気 (Yuki); 42. 自問 (Jimon); 43. 再逢 (Saihō); 44. 不図 (Futsuto)
12	June 19, 2026	978-4-06-543853-4	—	—
45. 意識 (Ishiki); 46. 対話 (Taiwa); 47. 覗光 (Nozokikō); 48. 溢出 (Mida)

=== Anime ===
An anime television series adaptation was announced on November 16, 2024. It will be produced by CompTown and directed by Tomoe Makino, with series composition and screenplays by Shōgo Yasukawa, characters designed by Ayumi Nishibata, and music composed by Jizue. The series is set to premiere in 2027. Remow has licensed the series.

== Reception ==
=== Accolades ===
The manga series was nominated for the Next Manga Awards in the digital category in 2022 and 2023. Okazu named it as one of the top ten yuri series of 2022, top three of 2023, and among the best of 2024 and 2025. The manga series was included by the New York Public Library in its 2023 Best Books for Teens list, and by the American Library Association in its 2025 Rainbow Book List. The series was selected as a recommended work in features from Book Asahi, Da Vinci, and School Library Journal.

=== Critical reception ===
The series' premise was well received. Erica Friedman named the series as a "masterwork" and "incredibly multilayered", rating the first volume an eight out of ten and the second volume a nine out of ten. Anime UK News called the first volume "beautiful for its art style and storytelling" and commended its depiction of romantic feelings, giving it a final score of nine out of ten. Christopher Farris and Rebecca Silverman of Anime News Network both gave the debut volume four and a half stars, with Farris opining that it "excel[s] at expressing itself" and Silverman praising it as "subtle in all the right ways".

The story was met with positive reactions. Anime UK News described the setting as realistic and complex for its exploration of a character's background, while Farris was impressed with the series for "how it can say so much with so little." Friedman called it a "sensitive and affirming" story of coming out that was "touching and so sincere". In a review of the eighth volume, she praised how it "never once retreats from the complexity of human lives".

Several critics commented favorably on the series' characters. Farris opined that the story's "true strength" is in how it lets its protagonists "speak for themselves." Koiwai of Manga News named Saki's kind personality as one of the story's strong points, while Anime UK News described Kanon as feeling real through the story's depiction of details in her everyday life. The relationship between the pair was also praised, with Léonard Fougère of IGN France calling it superb and Friedman naming it as the reason that she continued returning to the series.

The work's approach to disability representation was widely praised. Mai Yanagase of Real Sound commended the story for portraying Kanon as a complex rather than simplistically inspirational character. Fougère appreciated the series for treating disability as a social concern instead of an individual one, as well as the author's seriousness in addressing real-world issues. Friedman approved of the story for supporting greater disability representation in manga and for being "an outstanding example of how good storytelling can help us to be better."

The artwork was commended by multiple reviewers. Fougère praised Kuzushiro's illustrations as capable of effectively conveying her characters' intense emotions, a sentiment shared by Koiwai, who went on to also compliment the background illustrations. Silverman described the series as "beautifully illustrated" overall, while Anime UK News called the artwork "distinctive" with well-done shading, panels, and character designs.
