= Inugami-san to Nekoyama-san =

Japanese manga series

- First tankōbon volume cover

犬神さんと猫山さん
- Genre: Romantic comedy; Yuri
- Manga
- Written by: Kuzushiro
- Published by: Ichijinsha; Niconico
- Imprint: Yuri Hime Comics
- Magazine: Comic Yuri Hime; Niconico Yuri Hime
- Original run: November 18, 2011 – February 18, 2017
- Volumes: 6
- Anime television series
- Directed by: Shinpei Nagai
- Produced by: Kanako Umezawa, Gorō Shinjuku, Hitomi Nishioka, Taku Horie
- Written by: Shinpei Nagai
- Music by: G-angle
- Studio: Seven
- Original network: TV Saitama, KBS, tvk, AT-X, Sun TV
- Original run: April 11, 2014 – June 27, 2014
- Episodes: 12 + OVA
- icon

Inugami-san to Nekoyama-san (犬神さんと猫山さん; lit. "Inugami and Nekoyama") is a Japanese four-panel yuri manga series by Kuzushiro. It was serialized in Ichijinsha's Comic Yuri Hime from November 2011 to February 2017, with its chapters collected in six tankōbon volumes. A 12-episode anime television series adaptation by Seven aired in Japan from April to June 2014.

== Plot ==
Yachiyo Inugami is a dog-like girl who loves cats, whilst Suzu Nekoyama is a cat-like girl who loves dogs. When the two meet, an instant attraction is formed between the two.

== Characters ==
Yachiyo Inugami (犬神 八千代, Inugami Yachiyo)
Voiced by: Sumire Uesaka
Sixteen years old. Despite having a dog-like surname and personality, she is a cat lover. She is quite perverted and somewhat of a masochist. In the anime, when she is happy or excited, her ponytail will wag like a dog's tail.
Suzu Nekoyama (猫山 鈴, Nekoyama Suzu)
Voiced by: Nao Tōyama
Sixteen years old. The polar opposite of Yachiyo, as she has a cat-like surname and personality, but loves dogs.
Aki Hiiragi (柊木 秋, Hiiragi Aki)
Voiced by: Yuka Ōtsubo
Yachiyo's friend and Suzu's classmate, who often serves as the straight man trying to bring Yachiyo and Suzu's relationship back down to reality.
Mikine Nezu (杜松 美希音, Nezu Mikine)
Voiced by: Sayaka Horino
Yachiyo's classmate who, like a mouse, eats a lot of cheese and is generally nocturnal. She is a member of the biology club.
Yukiji Ushiwaka (牛若 雪路, Ushiwaka Yukiji)
Voiced by: Aoi Fujimoto
Mikine's senior in the biology club who, much like her cow-like name suggests, has ample breasts.
Sora Sarutobi (猿飛 空, Sarutobi Sora)
Voiced by: Shoko Nagahiro
The class president of Yachiyo's class. She hates being referred to as a monkey because of her name, even though she displays various monkey traits now and again.
Hibari Torikai (鳥飼 ひばり, Torikai Hibari)
Voiced by: Erii Yamazaki
Sora's bird-like childhood friend, who is often absent from class due to her poor health.
Tamaki Nekoyama (猫山 珠喜, Nekoyama Tamaki)
Voiced by: Hitomi Harada
Suzu's older sister who often dates several women and has constant hangovers.

== Media ==
=== Manga ===
Written and illustrated by Kuzushiro, Inugami-san to Nekoyama-san was serialized in Ichijinsha's Comic Yuri Hime from November 18, 2011, to February 18, 2017. Additionally, the series was released online in Niconico's web manga magazine Niconico Yuri Hime on February 18, 2013. Its chapters were collected by Ichijinsha in six tankōbon volumes, published from January 18, 2013, to August 3, 2017.

==== Volumes ====
No.	Release date	ISBN
1	January 18, 2013	978-4-7580-7224-3
2	November 18, 2013	978-4-7580-7279-3
3	April 18, 2014	978-4-7580-7299-1
4	March 18, 2015	978-4-7580-7398-1
5	June 18, 2016	978-4-7580-7541-1
6	August 3, 2017	978-4-7580-7698-2

=== Anime ===
An anime television series adaptation aired in Japan from April 11 to June 27, 2014, on TV Saitama, with later airings on KBS, tvk, AT-X and Sun TV, and was also simulcast on Niconico, Bandai Channel, and Crunchyroll. The series was directed, produced and written by Shinpei Nagai at studio Seven. The ending theme is "Zettai♡Fukujū Sengen" (絶対♡服従宣言; Declaration of Absolute♡Submission) by Sumire Uesaka and Nao Tōyama. The series was released on Blu-ray Disc and DVD on July 18, 2014, and includes an unaired episode.

==== Episodes ====
No.	Title	Original release date
1	"Inugami-san and Nekoyama-san"; Transliteration: "Inugami-san to Nekoyama-san" (Japanese: 犬神さんと猫山さん)	April 11, 2014
Yachiyo Inugami is a dog-like person who loves cats whilst Suzu Nekoyama is a cat-like person who loves dogs. Upon being introduced to each other by their mutual friend, Aki Hiiragi, the two take an instant interest in each other. Later, Yachiyo takes Suzu to her house to see her three pet dogs.
2	"Ushiwaka-san and Nezu-san"; Transliteration: "Ushiwaka-san to Nezu-san" (Japanese: 牛若さんと杜松さん)	April 18, 2014
Yachiyo gets to know her classmate, Mikine Nezu, who displays a lot of mouse-like tendencies. Later, Mikine takes Yachiyo and Suzu to the biology club to meet her upperclassman, Yukiji Ushikawa, who is much like a cow.
3	"Nekoyama-san and Catnip Tea"; Transliteration: "Nekoyama-san to Matatabi-cha" (Japanese: 猫山さんとまたたび茶)	April 25, 2014
Yachiyo brings in some tea spiked with sake, hoping to make Suzu drink it and become docile and affectionate. However, when the tea is spilled on Suzu as a result of Aki's attempt to stop Yachiyo, she behaves in a more lewd manner than expected.
4	"Nekoyama-san and Glasses"; Transliteration: "Nekoyama-san to Megane" (Japanese: 猫山さんとメガネ)	May 2, 2014
Following an eye exam, Yachiyo and Aki accompany Suzu to a glasses shop to get a new pair of glasses.
5	"Nekoyama-san and Karaoke"; Transliteration: "Nekoyama-san to Karaoke" (Japanese: 猫山さんとカラオケ)	May 9, 2014
Not wanting Yachiyo to witness her first time doing karaoke, Suzu goes with Mikine for a practice run.
6	"Inugami-san, Nekoyama-san, and a Day Off"; Transliteration: "Inugami-san to Nekoyama-san to Kyūjitsu" (Japanese: 犬神さんと猫山さんと休日)	May 16, 2014
Suzu, on an errand for her sister, Tamaki, ends up encountering Yachiyo, Aki, and Aki's little sisters whilst shopping.
7	"Inugami-san and Sarutobi-san"; Transliteration: "Inugami-san to Sarutobi-san" (Japanese: 犬神さんと猿飛さん)	May 23, 2014
The class representative, Sora Sarutobi, has a hard time dealing with Yachiyo's antics.
8	"Nekoyama-san and Torikai-san"; Transliteration: "Nekoyama-san to Torikai-san" (Japanese: 猫山さんと鳥飼さん)	May 30, 2014
Suzu and Yachiyo meet Sora's childhood friend, Hibari Torikai, who had been absent from school for a while.
9	"Inugami-san and a Lovers' Quarrel"; Transliteration: "Inugami-san to Chiwagenka" (Japanese: 犬神さんと痴話喧嘩)	June 6, 2014
Yachiyo and Suzu end up fighting with each other, which Aki soon realises is nothing more than a lovers' quarrel.
10	"Nekoyama-san and the Pool Opening"; Transliteration: "Nekoyama-san to Pūru Biraki" (Japanese: 猫山さんとプール開き)	June 13, 2014
As the school pool is opened, Suzu is reluctant to get into the water with Yachiyo.
11	"Nekoyama-san and the Sick Day"; Transliteration: "Nekoyama-san to Kaze no Hi" (Japanese: 猫山さんと風邪の日)	June 20, 2014
Suzu comes down with a cold, which results in her having a curious dream about Yachiyo.
12	"Inugami-san, Nekoyama-san, and the Summer Festival"; Transliteration: "Inugami-san to Nekoyama-san to Natsuyasumi" (Japanese: 犬神さんと猫山さんと夏祭り)	June 27, 2014
The girls go to a summer festival where they watch the fireworks together.
13 (OVA)	"Nekoyama-san and the Hot Spring Vacation"; Transliteration: "Nekoyama-san to Onsen Ryokō" (Japanese: 猫山さんと温泉旅行)	July 18, 2014
Aki wins tickets to a hot spring inn and invites Suzu to come along, with Yachiyo deciding to tag along.
