= Living With My Brother's Wife =

Japanese manga series

- First tankōbon volume cover, featuring Shino Kishibe (left) and Nozomi-san (right)

兄の嫁と暮らしています。 (Ani no Yome to Kurashiteimasu)
- Genre: Slice of life
- Manga
- Written by: Kuzushiro
- Published by: Square Enix
- English publisher: Square Enix
- Imprint: YG Comics
- Magazine: Young Gangan
- Original run: December 4, 2015 – January 17, 2025
- Volumes: 16
- icon

Living With My Brother's Wife (Japanese: 兄の嫁と暮らしています。, Hepburn: Ani no Yome to Kurashiteimasu) is a Japanese manga series written and illustrated by Kuzushiro. It was serialized in Square Enix's seinen manga magazine Young Gangan from December 2015 to January 2025, with its chapters collected in sixteen tankōbon volumes.

== Plot ==
Shino Kishibe is a 17-year-old high school student who lost her older brother, her last remaining kin, six months ago. Since then, she has been living with his widow, Nozomi-san. The story follows their budding relationship as they go about their daily lives.

== Publication ==
Written and illustrated by Kuzushiro, Living With My Brother's Wife was serialized in Square Enix's seinen manga magazine Young Gangan from December 4, 2015, to January 17, 2025. Square Enix collected its chapters in sixteen tankōbon volumes, released from July 25, 2016, to March 25, 2025.

Square Enix has published the manga in English on its Manga Up! digital service.

=== Volumes ===
No.	Japanese release date	Japanese ISBN
1	July 25, 2016	978-4-7575-5061-2
Chapters 1–10 (Note: Chapters are referred to as Diaries.)
2	February 25, 2017	978-4-7575-7013-9
Chapters 11–20
3	July 25, 2017	978-4-7575-5422-1
Chapters 21–30
4	February 24, 2018	9784-7-5755-636-2
Chapters 31–40
5	October 25, 2018	978-4-7575-5894-6
Chapters 41–50
6	June 25, 2019	978-4-7575-6172-4
Chapters 51–60
7	December 25, 2019	978-4-7575-6446-6
Chapters 61–70
8	August 25, 2020	978-4-7575-6767-2
Chapters 71–80
9	December 24, 2020	978-4-7575-7012-2
Chapters 81–90
10	July 26, 2021	978-4-7575-7386-4
Chapters 91–100
11	December 25, 2021	978-4-7575-7641-4
Chapters 101–110
12	July 25, 2022	978-4-7575-8039-8
Chapters 111–120
13	February 25, 2023	978-4-7575-8417-4
Chapters 121–130
14	September 25, 2023	978-4-7575-8807-3
Chapters 131–140
15	June 25, 2024	978-4-7575-9270-4
Chapters 141–150
16	March 25, 2025	978-4-7575-9765-5
Chapters 151–161

== Reception ==
The series placed 15th in the third Next Manga Award in the print category in 2017.
