= Kimino Tamenara Shineru =

Japanese yuri manga

- Cover of the final Japanese volume

姫のためなら死ねる
- Genre: Comedy; Romance; Yuri
- Manga
- Written by: Kuzushiro
- Published by: Takeshobo
- English publisher: NA: JManga
- Magazine: Manga Life Win
- Original run: March 10, 2010 – March 21, 2024
- Volumes: 14

Kimino Tamenara Shineru (姫(きみ)のためなら死ねる; "I Would Die for Your Sake, My Lady") is a Japanese yuri yonkoma manga written and illustrated by Kuzushiro. It was serialized online in Takeshobo's Manga Life Win from March 2010 to March 2024, and was licensed for an English-language release by JManga in 2012. The series is a comedy reimagining of the Japanese author Sei Shōnagon's life alongside Empress Teishi.

== Plot ==
The story takes place in the Heian era, following Sei Shonagon, a reclusive writer living a life of a NEET, who is captivated by the beauty of Empress Teishi and begins to serve the court as her private tutor. While Shonagon has her eyes on the empress, plenty of court ladies have their eyes on her.

== Publication ==
Written and illustrated by Kuzushiro, Kimino Tamenara Shineru was serialized online in Takeshobo's Manga Life Win from March 10, 2010, to March 21, 2024. The series was collected in fourteen tankōbon volumes from May 2011 to May 2024.

The series was licensed for an English release digitally by JManga.

| No. | Release date | ISBN |
|---|---|---|
| 1 | May 7, 2011 | 9784812475614 |
| 2 | April 7, 2012 | 9784812477618 |
| 3 | May 7, 2013 | 9784812481714 |
| 4 | April 7, 2014 | 9784812485491 |
| 5 | April 7, 2015 | 9784801952218 |
| 6 | May 7, 2016 | 9784801955189 |
| 7 | May 7, 2017 | 9784801959309 |
| 8 | May 7, 2018 | 9784801962545 |
| 9 | May 7, 2019 | 9784801966048 |
| 10 | May 7, 2020 | 9784801969339 |
| 11 | May 7, 2021 | 9784801972957 |
| 12 | May 7, 2022 | 9784801976283 |
| 13 | June 15, 2023 | 9784801980655 |
| 14 | May 16, 2024 | 9784801983113 |

== Reception ==
Erica Friedman of Yuricon gave the first volume an overall 8 rating, she praised the comedy, noting that "the story turns historical luminaries into jokes, and relates behaviors of the past to unlikely, but accurate analogies of the present with historically inaccurate, but nevertheless amusing, conviction." Friedman went on to note in her volume 5 review that the comedy became denser, "there's a lot of research that goes into this book and it shows. It's also getting harder to follow for this reader, as my knowledge of the Heian-kyo is superficial to say the least."
