= Even a Replica Can Fall in Love =

Japanese light novel series

- First light novel volume cover

レプリカだって、恋をする。 (Repurika Datte, Koi o Suru)
- Genre: Coming-of-age; Romance
- Light novel
- Written by: Harunadon
- Illustrated by: raemz
- Published by: ASCII Media Works
- English publisher: NA: Yen Press
- Imprint: Dengeki Bunko
- Original run: February 10, 2023 – April 10, 2026
- Volumes: 6
- Manga
- Written by: Harunadon
- Illustrated by: Momose Hanada
- Published by: ASCII Media Works
- English publisher: NA: Yen Press Kadokawa (digital)
- Imprint: Dengeki Comics NEXT
- Magazine: Dengeki Maoh
- Original run: April 26, 2023 – September 26, 2026
- Volumes: 6
- Anime television series
- Directed by: Ryuichi Kimura
- Written by: Tomoko Shinozuka; Misaki Morie
- Music by: Kanako Hara
- Studio: Voil
- Licensed by: Crunchyroll
- Original network: AT-X, Tokyo MX, SATV, TV Aichi, KBS Kyoto, Sun TV, BS11
- Original run: April 7, 2026 – June 30, 2026
- Episodes: 13
- icon

Even a Replica Can Fall in Love (Japanese: レプリカだって、恋をする。, Hepburn: Repurika Datte, Koi o Suru) is a Japanese light novel series written by Harunadon and illustrated by raemz. ASCII Media Works published six volumes from February 2023 to April 2026 under their Dengeki Bunko imprint. A manga adaptation illustrated by Momose Hanada was serialized in ASCII Media Works' Dengeki Maoh magazine from April 2023 to September 2026. An anime television series adaptation produced by Voil aired from April to June 2026.

== Plot ==
When she was seven years old, Sunao Aikawa created Nao, a replica of herself. Over the course of several years, Nao lives as Sunao, going to school and doing other things, while Sunao stays at home. However, as time goes on, Nao falls in love with Shuya Sanada. This complicates her arrangement with Sunao, knowing that Nao is not human and Sunao only knows about what happens at school due to Nao's reports. Nao now has to deal with her feelings for Shuya, being aware of who she is.

== Characters ==
Sunao Aikawa (愛川 素直, Aikawa Sunao)
Voiced by: Sumire Morohoshi
A stay-at-home girl. Due to past trauma, she stays at home and does not go to school. If she needs to go out, she sends Nao in her place, with Nao sending her reports about the day's events.
Nao (ナオ)
Voiced by: Sumire Morohoshi
An exact replica of Sunao that she created when she was seven. Nao goes to school as Sunao, with no one noticing her true identity or the arrangement. She is a member of the Literature Club.
Shuya Sanada (真田 秋也, Sanada Shūya)
Voiced by: Ryōta Suzuki
Nao's classmate and a member of the Literature Club.
Ritsuko Hironaka (広中 律子, Hironaka Ritsuko)
Voiced by: Yūki Takada
A fellow member of the Literature Club.
Suzumi Mori (森すずみ, Mori Suzumi)
Voiced by: Kaori Nazuka
A student council president.
Shun Mochizuki (望月隼, Mochizuki Shun)
Voiced by: Jun Fukuyama
A vice president of the student council and Suzumi's childhood friend.
Kozue Satou (佐藤梢, Satō Kozue)
Voiced by: Rina Hidaka
A class representative and a member of the Kendo Club.
Haruka Yoshii (吉井春華, Yoshī Haruka)
Voiced by: Shugo Nakamura
Nao's other classmate.

== Media ==
=== Light novel ===
Even a Replica Can Fall in Love is written by Harunadon and illustrated by raemz. ASCII Media Works published six volumes under their Dengeki Bunko light novel imprint from February 10, 2023, to April 10, 2026.

During their panel at Sakura-Con 2024, Yen Press announced that they had licensed the series for English publication, with the first volume releasing in September 2024.

No.	Original release date	Original ISBN	North American release date	North American ISBN
1	February 10, 2023	978-4-04-914873-2	September 17, 2024	978-1-9753-9241-3
Act One: "A Replica, Dreamless"; Act Two: "A Replica, Skipping"; Intermission: "Summer Vacation Without Her"; Act Three: "A Replica, Crying"; Act Four: "A Replica, Falling"; Act Five: "A Replica, Dreaming"; Last Act: "A Replica, in Love"
2	July 7, 2023	978-4-04-915008-7	January 21, 2025	979-8-8554-0120-2
Act One: "A Replica, Shaken"; Act Two: "A Replica, Searching"; Act Three: "A Replica, Finding"; Act Four: "A Replica, Touring"; Act Five: "A Replica, Screaming"; Last Act: "A Replica, Stricken"
3	December 8, 2023	978-4-04-915343-9	July 15, 2025	979-8-8554-0122-6
Act One: "A Replica, Tumbling"; Act Two: "A Replica, Traveling"; Intermission: "An Underclassman, Waiting"; Act Three: "A Replica, Savoring"; Act Four: "A Replica, Arriving"; Act Five: "A Replica, Throwing"; Last Act: "A Replica, Realizing"
4	July 10, 2024	978-4-04-915694-2	February 10, 2026	979-8-8554-1876-7
Act One: "A Replica, Gazing"; Act Two: "A Replica, Inviting"; Act Three: "A Replica, Riding"; Act Four: "A Replica, Smiling"; Intermission: "Life Without Her"; Act Five: "A Replica, Walking"; Last Act: "XXXX, Running"
5	August 8, 2025	978-4-04-915908-0	October 13, 2026	979-8-8554-3821-5
Act One: "Put-Off Winter"; Act Two: "Sweaty-Palm Spring"; Act Three: "Muggy-Rainy Season"; Act Four: "Even-Steven Autumn"; Act Five: "Melt-Away Winter"; Intermission: "Aikawa the Unconquerable"; Last Act: "Spring Is Here"
6	April 10, 2026	978-4-04-916806-8	—	—

=== Manga ===
A manga adaptation illustrated by Momose Hanada was serialized in ASCII Media Works' Dengeki Maoh magazine from April 26, 2023, to September 26, 2026. The manga's chapters were compiled into seven tankōbon volumes released from November 27, 2023, to October 27, 2026.

The manga adaptation is published digitally in English on Kadokawa's BookWalker website. During their panel at Anime Expo 2025, Yen Press announced that they had also licensed the manga adaptation for English publication.

No.	Original release date	Original ISBN	North American release date	North American ISBN
1	November 27, 2023	978-4-04-915377-4	December 16, 2025	979-8-8554-1952-8
Chapters 1–5; Bonus: "One Wish"
2	June 26, 2024	978-4-04-915809-0	June 23, 2026	979-8-8554-1954-2
Chapters 6–11; Bonus: "The Real Deal and the Replica"
3	December 27, 2024	978-4-04-916181-6	April 27, 2027	979-8-8554-2765-3
4	August 8, 2025	978-4-04-916641-5	—	—
5	April 27, 2026	978-4-04-952188-7	—	—
6	May 27, 2026	978-4-04-952228-0	—	—
7	October 27, 2026	978-4-04-952467-3	—	—

=== Anime ===
An anime television series adaptation was announced during the "Dengeki Bunko Winter Festival 2025" livestream event on February 16, 2025. The series will be produced by Voil and directed by Ryuichi Kimura, with Tomoko Shinozuka handling series composition and writing scripts alongside Misaki Morie, Eiji Abiko designing the characters, and Kanako Hara composing the music. It was broadcast from April 7 to June 30, 2026, on AT-X and other networks. The opening theme song, "Refrain", is performed by Shytaupe, and the ending theme song, "Awa", is performed by Asmi. Crunchyroll has streamed the series.

==== Episodes ====
No.	Title	Directed by (Note: Production staff information is taken from the ending credits of each episode.)	Written by	Storyboard by	Original release date
1	"A Replica Never Dreams"; Transliteration: "Repurika wa, Yume o Minai" (Japanese: レプリカは、夢を見ない。)	Taketomo Ishikawa	Tomoko Shinozuka	Ryuichi Kimura	April 7, 2026
Nao is a Replica, a perfect copy of Sunao Aikawa that Sunao somehow wishes into existence through unknown means whenever she needs her. As a perfect copy Nao is used to live Sunao's life for her whenever she does not want to go outside. At school Nao is a member of the Literature Club and friends with Ritsuko Hironaka, but the better she lives Sunao's life for her trying to make her happy, the unhappier and more isolated Sunao becomes. One day classmate Shuya Sanada joins Literature club after an injury forces him to quit Basketball club. Despite sharing Sunao's strong memories Nao finds herself bonding with Shuya over their taste in books, whereas Sunao has no interest in him at all. Nao worries what might happen in the future since she now has goals that are different from Sunao's, yet she only exists when Sunao wants her to. The next day Shuya is confused Sunao has no memory of anything they discussed the previous day, and seems annoyed he is talking to her.
2	"A Replica Skips School"; Transliteration: "Repurika wa, Saboru" (Japanese: レプリカは、サボる。)	Satoshi Saga	Tomoko Shinozuka	Masato Takayanagi	April 14, 2026
Suspicious, Sunao does not summon Nao for days but is eventually forced to let Nao attend school to sit Sunao's exams. To explain Sunao's behaviour, Nao claims to Shuya that she has extreme mood swings, so to avoid her bad moods they should only talk when she has her hair in a ponytail. Ritsuko reveals she is writing a story about doppelgangers, causing Nao to wonder about her own existence. Nao discusses a field trip with Ritsuko and Shuya, even though it will be Sunao on the trip. During the trip Shuya is disappointed he cannot talk to her. Nao attends school for closing ceremony, but Shuya convinces her to skip the ceremony with him. As she has no money, Nao retrieves ¥200,000 she has saved without Sunao knowing. She and Shuya visit a zoo but Nao realises the walking is paining Shuya's leg. She remembers a rumour that older team members injured Shuya on purpose, but he refuses to talk about it. Sunao is upset Nao skipped the ceremony and accuses her of trying to take over her life. She then wishes Nao out of existence and to never come back.
3	"A Replica is Confused"; Transliteration: "Repurika wa, Madō" (Japanese: レプリカは、惑う。)	Akira Toba	Tomoko Shinozuka	Im Ka-hee	April 21, 2026
Sunao does not summon Nao for over a month. Returning to school, Shuya accuses Nao of not being Sunao. At first Nao is afraid, until Shuya admits he is the same as her, a Replica of the real Shuya Sanada. Nao admits she is the Replica of Sunao, so Shuya starts calling her Nao and asks that she call him Aki. Aki is surprised Nao has existed since junior school, since he only appeared several months ago, the day Shuya was supposed to return to school after his injury. Aki admits he is worried about Shuya, who has not left the house since his teammate attacked him. Nao and Aki become close due to their shared secret. Thanks to Nao taking her exams for her, Sunao learns she can attend college, but is asked by a teacher if she even wants to attend college. She asks Nao about Shuya and tells her it was his teammate Koh Hayase that broke his ankle from jealousy. Nao recalls Koh tried to force Sunao to be team manager and was angry she refused. Ritsuko suggests Nao and Aki attend a local shrine festival. After enjoying themselves, Aki confesses this will be the last time she sees him as the only reason he exists was to help Shuya get revenge on Koh, so very soon Shuya will not need him anymore.
4	"A Replica Cries"; Transliteration: "Repurika wa, Naiteiru" (Japanese: レプリカは、泣いている。)	Takanori Yano	Misaki Morie	Hajime Katoki	April 28, 2026
Aki explains he is supposed to physically cripple Koh, then when Koh tells the police Shuya will have been elsewhere with witnesses making an alibi. Nao insists it is wrong so Aki tells Shuya he will humiliate Koh instead by defeating him at basketball. Nao explains everything to Sunao, who agrees with the plan. Aki demands Koh apologise if he loses. Koh confidently assumes Aki cannot run, only for Aki to steal the ball and win the match. Aki reveals he never told the police about Koh because the team would not have won their preliminary matches if both Koh and Shuya were off the team. Koh insists the ankle was a genuine accident, but does apologise. Shuya thanks Aki but claims his victory must be because Aki does not have ankle pain. Furious, Nao reveals to both Shuya and Sunao that of course Aki feels Shuya's pain because Replicas have the same injuries and pain as their originals. Shuya and Sunao feel shame their Replicas are somehow living better lives than they are despite feeling the same pain. Aki believes Shuya will soon want to live his own life again and wish him out of existence permanently. Someone tries to push Aki under a train, but Nao saves Aki and falls under the train instead of him.
5	"A Replica Dreams"; Transliteration: "Repurika wa, Yume o Miru" (Japanese: レプリカは、夢を見る。)	Mamiko Sekiya	Tomoko Shinozuka	Ryuichi Kimura	May 5, 2026
Panicking, Aki tells Sunao Nao was murdered. Sunao panics and resummons Nao who has a clear memory that Koh pushed Aki. Nao is grateful it was not Sunao that died, since they would both be gone permanently. Sunao realises she and Nao have become very different people. That night Nao dreams of her and Sunao growing old together, but is sad as she knows it cannot happen. The next day she deliberately terrifies Koh, who thought she was dead and becomes convinced she is a vengeful spirit. Nao starts to question if Doppelgangers are human, or even living beings. That night, she walks into the ocean to try and turn into sea foam like the Doppelganger legends, but Aki pulls her back. Nao insists if she cannot be human she would rather be sea foam. Aki confesses he loves her and wants her to exist for as long as possible. Nao realises she was being foolish. Ritsuko, on the phone in Aki's pocket, shouts at Nao and reveals she has known she is a Doppelganger for years, since it was completely obvious she and Sunao are different people. She also points out Aki and Nao are clearly a couple now. That weekend, Nao and Aki go on their first date to a movie.
6	"A Replica is Shaken"; Transliteration: "Repurika wa, Yureru" (Japanese: レプリカは、揺れる。)	Satoshi Saga	Misaki Morie	Masato Takayanagi	May 12, 2026
Former student-president Mori, and former vice-president Mochizuki, reveal the school is disbanding small clubs. Mori reveals if Literature Club can produce a magazine and sell 100 copies during Seiryo Festival they might avoid disbandment. Nao is confident they will sell 100 if they include one of Ritsuko's novels. Sunao agrees to let Nao attend school every day for a month to work on the magazine, then they will take alternate days attending the two-day festival. Ritsuko decides to team up with Mochizuki as his Drama Club is also facing disbandment, as he is the only member. If they act The Bamboo Cutter as a drama, people might buy the magazine if it contains the matching novel. Nao worries she cannot act, but Aki points out she has been acting like Sunao for years, so she should do fine. Someone unseen covers the school in letters claiming there is a Doppelganger among them, worrying Nao she might be exposed. Nao asks Mori to draw the poster for their drama and to play Princess Kaguya. Aki and Nao turn out to be terrible actors, while Mori is a very good actress. Aki takes Nao on an aquarium date and admits he is glad she is not playing Princess Kaguya as it would be too similar to her own recent attempt to turn into sea foam.
7	"A Replica Searches"; Transliteration: "Repurika wa, Sagasu" (Japanese: レプリカは、探す。)	Taketomo Ishikawa	Tomoko Shinozuka	Atsushi Ōtsuki	May 19, 2026
Sunao is confused Nao and Aki have not "gone further" in their relationship. Girls at school ask Nao about kissing. As Nao has no experience she is saved from the conversation by Sato, who struggles to get along with other girls. Ritsuko starts looking for whoever printed the doppelganger letters. Nao overhears Mori arguing with Mochizuki about him volunteering her to play Princess Kaguya before storming off. Mochizuki reveals to Nao he confessed to Mori weeks ago, but she is acting like it never happened, so he is throwing himself into work to avoid his feelings. Ritsuko finishes the Bamboo Cutter novel from the grandmother's perspective and focuses on the love they have for their adopted granddaughter Princess Kaguya. The changes make Mori cry. Ritsuko discovers the letters were thrown from the roof. Classmate Yoshi reveals it was Mori that went to the roof that day. Mori admits she knows Nao is Sunao's replica because she too is a replica. She demands to know if replicas can die to save the life of the original, as the real Mori was seriously injured and she is desperate to save her life. Aki intervenes, revealing he is a replica but they do not know anything about how they exist.
8	"A Replica is Messed Up"; Transliteration: "Repurika wa, Yugamu" (Japanese: レプリカは、歪む。)	Akira Toba	Misaki Morie	Noriyo Sasaki	May 26, 2026
Nao attends day 2 of the festival and learns Sunao sold 19 magazines, so Nao must sell 81. Mori visits her original, Suzumi, in a coma at her home. Suzumi's mother, who is aware Mori is a doppleganger, wishes her luck for her performance. For the class haunted house Aki dresses as Dracula, with Nao as his dead maid. Nao is terrified by the ghosts, amusing Aki. To feel better, Nao demands a non-scary date. While applying makeup for the play, Mori sees her reflection and has a panic attack thinking about Suzumi. Mori confesses Suzumi first summoned her when she was five to replace her in her kindergarten play, but her parents ended up seeing both of them at the same time. Confused, they sent Mori to live with her grandparents for 13 years, during which Mori was not allowed to see Suzumi or attend school. When Suzumi was injured and entered her coma, her mother demanded Mori attend school for her and maintain her grades so Suzumi can still go to college when she wakes up. Mori has struggled at this, since she was never educated like Suzumi, and can barely keep up in class. She decides all Replicas must be stupid, to willingly spend their whole existence impersonating someone else without asking why.
9	"A Replica is Bereft"; Transliteration: "Repurika wa, Ushinau" (Japanese: レプリカは、失う。)	Yuuichirou Iida	Tomoko Shinozuka	Ryuichi Kimura	June 2, 2026
As the class performs the Bamboo Cutter Nao realises the story mirrors Mori's own life; an inhuman being who enters the human world but is forced by circumstances to return where she came from. Nao invents new dialogue for her character, urging Mori to admit what she wants. Mori admits she wants to stay with her family. Feeling guilty, Suzumi's mother gives Mori a letter Suzumi wrote before her accident. The letter explains about Mochizuki confessing to Suzumi, which Mori was unaware of, explaining why she never responded to Mochizuki's confession. She apologises for accidentally exposing them, but is glad Mori was happy being raised by her grandparents. Nao asks for her real name, and Mori reveals Suzumi called her Ryo. Ryo decides to return home to Suzumi's grandparents, whom she considers her parents. Mochizuki confesses again, but Ryo rejects him, claiming she is in love with someone else. Aki and Nao almost kiss but are interrupted by a classmate. Ryo closes the festival with a speech, only to suddenly vanish in front of the whole school. Nao is devastated to realise Suzumi must have died. The next day, the school announces Suzumi died after months in a coma, but offers no explanation for how she was attending school at the same time, leaving everyone confused. Nao deeply mourns Ryo's death. Sunao announces she will start attending school again, shocking Nao.
10	"A Replica Stumbles"; Transliteration: "Replica wa, Korogaru" (Japanese: レプリカは、転がる。)	Michita Shiraishi	Misaki Morie	Atsuko Kase	June 9, 2026
Having returned to school permanently, Sunao talks about Suzumi and Ryo with Shuya, who has also returned to school. For an upcoming overnight field trip, they form a group with Haruka and Kozue. Nao remains at home mourning Ryo. The school seems to quietly accept that it was Suzumi's spirit attending school while her body was in a coma. As he is also not attending school, Aki invites Nao to a hot spring, along with Ritsuko who skipped morning classes to convince Nao to go, but returns to school soon after. Left alone with Aki, they bathe separately then decide to get a seafood lunch. At school, Sunao begins studying for a national exam. Nao and Aki discuss what they might be able to do in the future, since with Sunao and Shuya taking back their own lives, they technically have no identities of their own to attend college or get jobs. They visit the beach where Nao admits she is depressed as she misses Ryo and has no idea what Sunao plans to do next. Aki admits to feeling the same about Shuya, who might wish him out of existence at any moment. Nao suddenly suggests they go on their own overnight trip to Makaino Farm Resort.
11	"A Replica Travels"; Transliteration: "Replica wa, Tabinideru" (Japanese: レプリカは、旅に出る。)	Takanori Yano	Tomoko Shinozuka	Atsushi Ōtsuki	June 16, 2026
Nao and Sunao both go on their respective trips. Sunao starts to notice how her own life is improving. Aki is interested in seeing where Ryo lived with her grandparents. Nao worries about Sunao and admits she feels uneasy Sunao no longer relies on her as much. Sunao starts to enjoy herself with Shuya, Haruka and Kozue. While enjoying Makaino Resort Nao and Aki encounter Shun from the year above them, who is currently staying with Ryo's grandparents. He is aware the class trip is to Kyoto, so he outright asks if Aki and Nao are dopplegangers like Ryo was. Shuya admits to Sunao he had no plan what to do after getting his revenge on Koh, but returning to school was definitely the right choice to get over his depression. Learning they intend to stay the night, Shun invites Aki and Nao to Ryo's grandparent's home, who are glad to meet more of Ryo's friends. Ryo's grandmother reveals when Ryo came to them as a little girl she was terrified of everything with low self esteem, so they introduced her to farming and painting. Before long she was a happy child they considered their daughter. Nao is happy that, wherever Ryo is now, there will always be people who miss her.
12	"A Replica Tosses"; Transliteration: "Replica wa, Nageru" (Japanese: レプリカは、投げる。)	Ryuichi Kimura & Shota Wada	Misaki Morie	Masayuki Miyaji	June 23, 2026
A classmate confesses to Sunao, whom she rejects but is scolded for being unnecessarily harsh. She admits to Haruka she is never nice to anybody, even though it upsets her. She suddenly tells Haruka about Nao, who she made as a perfect copy, but as Nao is kind and happy, Sunao increasingly feels like she is the replica. As this feeling worsened, she stopped leaving the house. Haruka admits she actually realised Nao was a Replica during the festival and asks why she keeps Nao around. Sunao admits she is attached to Nao and cannot just get rid of her. Shuya appears and admits about Aki. Haruka admits she also had a Replica in middle school, Kozue, who appeared only once to stand up to a group of bullies, then never appeared again. They wonder if Replicas are actually version of themselves they wish to be. That night, Nao asks to hold Aki's hand so she can fall asleep. Shun, who was awake the whole time, admits he misses Suzumi but he does not blame them for keeping the existence of Replicas a secret. He also shares that he could never create a Replica as it would mean missing out on his own life. He is disappointed they might never be returning to school.
13	"And Then, The Replica"; Transliteration: "Soshite, Repurika wa" (Japanese: そして、レプリカは。)	Ryuichi Kimura	Tomoko Shinozuka	Ryuichi Kimura	June 30, 2026
Ryo's grandparents, Taeko and Yutaka, offer Nao and Aki a place to live since staying with their originals will be too difficult. Later, Sunao and Shuya summon them to Kyoto. As it is the first time all four of them are in the same place they discover a strange phenomenon: Shuya cannot see Nao, Sunao cannot see Aki, and Haruka cannot see either of them. Haruka explains this proves the legend that an original and their doppelgänger cannot be seen simultaneously. She reveals that doppelgängers come from another dimension and temporarily borrow their originals' physical bodies, which the original is unaware of since they temporarily exist only in spirit form. Sunao vows to become a better person and stop forcing Nao to handle her life's hardships. Suddenly, Nao's fingers temporarily disappear, sparking an epiphany: the kindness Sunao lost, and the courage Shuya lost, actually went into Nao and Aki. Nao suggests that merging would restore Sunao's kindness and Shuya's courage, but it might cause them to disappear forever. Though Sunao leaves the choice to her and Aki begs her not to, Nao tearfully moves to hug Sunao. Weeks later, Sunao and Shuya graduate and celebrate with friends. Elsewhere, Nao and Aki enjoy the beach together, having ultimately chosen not to merge with their originals so they can live their own separate lives.

== Reception ==
The series won the Grand Prize at the 29th Dengeki Novel Prize in 2022.

== See also ==
- Chitose Is in the Ramune Bottle, another light novel series with the same illustrator
- If the Villainess and Villain Met and Fell in Love, another light novel series with the same writer
- Love Unseen Beneath the Clear Night Sky, another light novel series with the same illustrator
