= Yuki Hayashi (composer) =

Yuki Hayashi 林 ゆうき
- Born: 31 December 1980 (age 45); Kyoto, Japan
- Occupations: Musician, composer, arranger
- Years active: 2009-present
- Labels: Legendoor (2009-2021); Hayashi Factory (2021-present)
- Website: Official website; Official Legendoor page

Yuki Hayashi (林 ゆうき, Hayashi Yūki; born 31 December 1980) is a Japanese composer and arranger best known for his work on the soundtracks for anime, television series, and films. His notable works include Triangle (in collaboration with Hiroyuki Sawano), Zettai Reido, Diabolik Lovers, Asa ga Kita, Haikyū!!, and My Hero Academia.

== Biography ==
Hayashi was born in Kyoto, Japan. He used to be an athlete for Men's Rhythmic Gymnastics and then he became fascinated by background score when selecting gymnastics floor music. Although he had no experience in producing music before, he started learning to compose himself during college years. He sold one of his pieces for 5000 yen to junior players as their gymnastics background music, and progressively more orders came after other teams heard his works. After graduation, he became an apprentice of Hideo Kobayashi to learn beatmaking and meanwhile, he also began making background music for dancesport.

He then joined the music agency Legendoor in 2009 with his first major work being Triangle with Hiroyuki Sawano, and Robotics;Notes with Asami Tachibana and Takeshi Abo being his first anime work. In March 2021, it was announced that Hayashi's contract with Legendoor will be terminated as of October 2021 after 12 years, with him establishing his own company named Hayashi Factory and working as an independent composer from April 2021.

== Discography ==
=== Personal album ===
- Hayashi Seisakusho~Oto No Tsumeawase Bin 1 (Feb 2016)

=== Television series ===
- Triangle (2009, with Hiroyuki Sawano)
- BOSS (2009, with Hiroyuki Sawano and Takafumi Wada)
- Jyouou (2009)
- Left-Eye Detective EYE (2010)
- Zettai Reido (2010)
- Tumbling (2010, Rhythmic gymnastics floor music)
- Perfect Report (2010)
- Strawberry Night series
1. SP Strawberry Night (Nov 2010)
2. TV Drama Strawberry Night (Jan-Mar 2012)
3. Strawberry Midnight (Jan 2013)
4. SP Strawberry Night: After the Invisible Rain (Jan 2013)
- Zettai Reido 2 (2011)
- Taisetsu na Koto wa Subete Kimi ga Oshiete Kureta (2011)
- BOSS 2nd Season (2011)
- Asuko March!~Kenritsu Asuka Kougyou Koukou Koushinkyoku~ (2011)
- Last Money: Ai no Nedan (2011)
- DOCTORS: Saikyo no Mei series
1. DOCTORS: Saikyo no Mei (2011)
2. SP DOCTORS: Saikyo no Mei (2013)
3. DOCTORS2: Saikyo no Mei (2013)
4. DOCTORS3: Saikyo no Mei (2015)
- Legal High series
1. Legal High (2012, with Yuji Ono in Episode 7)
2. SP Legal High (2013)
3. Legal High 2nd Season (2013)
- Rich Man, Poor Woman series
1. Rich Man, Poor Woman (2012)
2. Rich Man, Poor Woman in New York (2013)
- Emergency Interrogation Room series
1. Emergency Interrogation Room (2014)
2. Emergency Interrogation Room Second Season (2017)
- Kazoku Ikari (2014)
- Yoshiwarauradonshin (2014)
- Genkai Shyuraku Kabushiki Gaisha (2015)
- -The Angel and the Demon- (2015)
- The God of Risk (2015)
- Asa ga Kita (2015)
- Fragile (2016, with Asami Tachibana)
- Good Partner: Muteki no Bengoshi (2016)
- War of Lie (2017, with Asami Tachibana)
- I'm Your Destiny (2017)
- My Lover's Secret (2017, with Asami Tachibana)
- Hitoshi Ueki and His Pupil (2017)
- May I Blackmail You? (2017)
- Oh My Jump! -Shōnen Jump Saves the World- (2018)
- Signal: Chōki Mikaiketsu Jiken Sōsahan (2018, with Asami Tachibana)
- Fuhatsu-dan -Burakku Manei o Ayatsuru Otoko- (2018)
- Sakanoue Animal Clinic Story (2018)
- Ieyasu Builds the City of Edo (2019)
- Banjo no Arufa ~Yakusoku no Shogi~ (2019)
- Zekkyo (2019)
- Mirror Twins (2019, with Takahiro Obata)
- Anata no Ban desu (2019, with Asami Tachibana)
- Yuganda Hamon (2019)
- 10 no Himitsu (2020, with Asami Tachibana)
- Influence (2021, with Mizuki Kanno and Daiki Okuno)
- Guilty Flag (2021, with Asami Tachibana)
- Mirai e no 10 Count (2022)
- Shin Shinchō Kōki (2022)
- Giver Taker (2023, with Daiki Okuno)
- Wave, Listen to Me! (2023, with Shōgo Yamashiro)

=== Anime films ===
- Strawberry Night (2013)
- Kamisama no Karute 2 (2014)
- Blue Spring Ride (2014)
- April Fools (2015)
- Erased (2015)
- Aozora Yell (2016)
- One Piece Film: Gold (2016)
- PreCure movie series
1. Pretty Cure Dream Stars! (2017)
2. KiraKira☆PreCure à la Mode: Crisply! The Memory of Mille-feuille! (2017)
3. Pretty Cure Super Stars! (2018)
4. Hugtto! PreCure Futari wa Pretty Cure: All Stars Memories (2018)
5. PreCure Miracle Universe (2019, with Asami Tachibana)
- My Little Monster (2018)
- My Hero Academia movie series
1. My Hero Academia: Two Heroes (2018)
2. My Hero Academia: Heroes Rising (2020)
3. My Hero Academia: World Heroes' Mission (2021)
4. My Hero Academia: You're Next (2024)
- Fortuna's Eye (2019)
- The Door into Summer (2021)
- Haikyu!! The Dumpster Battle (2024)
- Gekijōban Medalist (2027)

=== Anime series ===
- Bannou Yasai Ninninman (2011)
- ROBOTICS;NOTES (2012, with Asami Tachibana and Takeshi Abo)
- Blood Lad (2012)
- Diabolik Lovers series
1. Diabolik Lovers (2013)
2. Diabolik Lovers More, Blood (2015, with Saki)
- Gundam Build Fighters series
1. Gundam Build Fighters (2013)
2. Gundam Build Fighters Try (2014, with Asami Tachibana)
- Haikyū!! series (with Asami Tachibana)
1. Haikyū!! (2014)
2. Haikyū!! Second Season (2015)
3. Haikyū!! Karasuno High School vs Shiratorizawa Academy (2016)
4. Haikyū!! To the Top (2020)
- Soul Eater Not! (2014, with Asami Tachibana)
- DRAMAtical Murder (2014)
- Death Parade (2015)
- Classroom☆Crisis (2015)
- Kiznaiver (2016)
- My Hero Academia series
1. My Hero Academia (2016)
2. My Hero Academia 2nd Season (2017)
3. My Hero Academia 3rd Season (2018)
4. My Hero Academia 4th Season (2019)
5. My Hero Academia 5th Season (2021)
6. My Hero Academia 6th Season (2022)
7. My Hero Academia 7th Season (2024)
8. My Hero Academia: Final Season (2025)
- Trickster (2016)
- PreCure series
1. Kirakira PreCure a la Mode (2017)
2. Hugtto! PreCure (2018)
3. Star Twinkle PreCure (2019, with Asami Tachibana)
- Dive!! (2017, with Kohta Yamamoto)
- Welcome to the Ballroom (2017)
- Junji Ito Collection (2018)
- Double Decker! Doug & Kirill (2018)
- Karakuri Circus (2018)
- Run with the Wind (2018)
- Pocket Monster (2019)
- Dragon Quest: The Adventure of Dai (2020)
- Shaman King series
1. Shaman King (2021)
2. Shaman King: Flowers (2024)
- Backflip!! (2021)
- Love All Play (2022)
- Beast Tamer (2022, with Alisa Okehazama and Naoyuki Chikatani)
- Arknights: Prelude to Dawn (2022)
- UniteUp! (2023)
- Junji Ito Maniac: Japanese Tales of the Macabre (2023)
- Insomniacs After School (2023)
- Gundam Build Metaverse (2023)
- Wistoria: Wand and Sword (2024)
- The Blue Wolves of Mibu (2024)
- I Want to Escape from Princess Lessons (2025)
- Medalist series
1. Medalist (2025)
2. Medalist 2nd Season (2026)
- Sakamoto Days series
1. Sakamoto Days (2025)
2. Sakamoto Days 2nd Season (2027)
- My Hero Academia: Vigilantes (2025, with Shōgo Yamashiro and Yuki Furuhashi)
- April Showers Bring May Flowers (2025, with Shōgo Yamashiro)
- Turkey! Time to Strike (2025)
- Cat's Eye (2025)
- An Observation Log of My Fiancée Who Calls Herself a Villainess (2026, with Luke Standridge and Asa Taylor)
- Dandelion (2026)
- Devils' Crest (2026, with Naoyuki Chikatani)
- Arcanadea (2027, with Yuki Furuhashi)
- Magical Buffs: The Support Caster Is Stronger Than He Realized! (2027, with Luke Stanridge and Asa Taylor)
- The One Piece (2027)
- Just Like Mona Lisa (2027)
- Destiny Unchain Online (2027)
- Witch and Hound (TBA)

=== Television programmes ===
- Mr. Sunday (2010, Fuji TV)
- Close-up Tohoku (2011, NHK)
- Tsuiseki! Shinsou No File (2012, NHK)
- Athlete No Tamashi (2012, NHK)
- Sports Plus (2013, NHK)
- World Sport MLB (2015, NHK)
- 66th NHK Kōhaku Uta Gassen Opening Theme "Zattsu Oomisoka" (2015, NHK)

=== Video games ===
- Alice Order (2015)
- Super Mecha Champions (2019, with Yoshiya Ikeda)
- Re:Legend (2019)
- Gundam Battle: Gunpla Warfare (2019, Main theme only)
- Unknown Future (2020, with Asami Tachibana)
- The Centennial Case: A Shijima Story (2022, with several others)

=== Sports ===
- 2013 National Inter-High School Championships Men's Rhythmic Gymnastics- Aomoriyamada Music
- 2015 MISS POLEDANCE JAPAN Ayaka Sakai Music

=== Commercials ===
- Kyoto Animation "Ajisai" CM (2011)
- Social Game Dragon Tactics Winter CM (2012–2013)
