= Destiny Unchain Online =

Japanese light novel series

- Destiny Unchain Online: How I Became the Crimson Devil
- First light novel volume cover

Destiny Unchain Online 〜吸血鬼少女となって、やがて『赤の魔王』と呼ばれるようになりました〜 (Destiny Unchain Online: Kyūketsuki Shōjo to Natte, Yagate "Aka no Maō" to Yobareru Yō ni Narimashita)
- Genre: Isekai
- Novel series
- Written by: Resn
- Published by: Shōsetsuka ni Narō; (May 9, 2020 – 2021); Kakuyomu; (June 30, 2021 – present)
- Original run: May 9, 2020 – present
- Light novel
- Written by: Resn
- Illustrated by: Yachimoto
- Published by: Kodansha
- Imprint: Kodansha Ranobe Books
- Original run: November 2, 2022 – present
- Volumes: 3
- Manga
- Written by: Resn
- Illustrated by: Yachimoto
- Published by: Kodansha
- English publisher: Kodansha (digital)
- Imprint: Monthly Shōnen Magazine Comics
- Magazine: Magazine Pocket
- Original run: July 22, 2022 – present
- Volumes: 13
- Anime television series
- Directed by: Kōichi Hatsumi
- Written by: Seiko Takagi
- Music by: Yuki Hayashi; Yuki Furuhashi; Hayato
- Studio: Voil
- Original run: 2027 – scheduled

Destiny Unchain Online: How I Became the Crimson Devil (Note: Japanese: Destiny Unchain Online 〜吸血鬼少女となって、やがて『赤の魔王』と呼ばれるようになりました〜, Hepburn: Destiny Unchain Online: Kyūketsuki Shōjo to Natte, Yagate "Aka no Maō" to Yobareru Yō ni Narimashita) is a Japanese web novel series written by Resn. It was originally posted on the online publication platform Shōsetsuka ni Narō in May 2020, before transferring to Kadokawa's online publication platform Kakuyomu in June 2021. Kodansha later began publishing it as a light novel under their Kodansha Ranobe Books imprint in November 2022, featuring illustrations by Yachimoto; three volumes have been published as of June 2026. A manga adaptation illustrated by Yachimoto began serialization on Kodansha's Magazine Pocket service in July 2022, with 13 volumes released as of August 2026. An anime television series adaptation produced by Voil is set to premiere in 2027.

== Plot ==
Kou Mitsuki, the son of skilled video games developers and is on the cusp of entering high school, has been selected to test his father's new VRMMORPG game Destiny Unchain Online. The test involves him entering a device called a Cradle, which allows him to fully immerse in the game. After being told that the game was made specifically made for him, he decides to name himself Crim and create his own character. However, he ends up becoming a vampire girl, with him unable to log out of the game. Faced with this situation, Kou decides to continue the game normally, forming a party and doing the game's quests. At the same time, due to the effects of the Cradle, his real-life body becomes that of a woman's.

== Characters ==
Kou Mitsuki (満月 紅, Mitsuki Kō)
Voiced by: Ikumi Hasegawa
The son of developers at the company NTEC. Due to glitches in the character creation system and the game, he is only able to pick a female vampire character, and he is also unable to log out. In-game, his character is Crim (クリム, Kurimu), a vampire of the Noble Red race. He is initially a vegetarian, which complicates his in-game life as a vampire given that he also had an aversion to blood. It is later revealed that he was originally born female as the human-vampire hybrids. Due to the uncontrollable vampiric lust, his parents transformed him into male not long after he was born.
Hijiri Furuya (古谷 聖, Furuya Hijiri)
Kou's childhood friend. Although she and Kou are close, she and her younger twin brother Subaru are almost a year older than Kou. Because Kou's parents were busy, she often took care of him. She has had feelings for Kou for a long time. After Kou becomes a woman in the real world, Hijiri teaches Kou about how to live as a woman. In-game, her character is Freya (フレイヤ, Fureiya), a high elf.
Subaru Furuya (古谷 昴, Furuya Subaru)
Hijiri's younger twin brother and Kou's best friend. He wears glasses and practiced swordfighting with Kou when they were younger. In-game, his character is Frey (フレイ, Furei), a high elf just like Hijiri's character.

== Media ==
=== Light novels ===
Resn originally began serializing the series as a web novel on the online publication platform Shōsetsuka ni Narō on May 9, 2020, as a sequel to their previous web novel Worldgate Online. It was later deleted from the website, with serialization moving to Kadokawa's online publication platform Kakuyomu on June 30, 2021. The series was also posted to the Hameln website. Kodansha later began publishing it as a light novel under their Kodansha Ranobe Books imprint on November 2, 2022, with illustrations by Yachimoto; three volumes have been released as of June 2026.

No.	Release date	ISBN
1	November 2, 2022	978-4-06-527128-5
2	August 2, 2024	978-4-06-532365-6
3	June 2, 2026	978-4-06-540586-4

=== Manga ===
A manga adaptation illustrated by Yachimoto began serialization on Kodansha's Magazine Pocket service on July 22, 2022. The first tankōbon volume was released on September 8, 2022; 13 volumes have been released as of August 2026. The manga adaptation is serialized in English on Kodansha's K Manga service.

No.	Release date	ISBN
1	September 8, 2022	978-4-06-529419-2
2	December 8, 2022	978-4-06-529972-2
3	March 9, 2023	978-4-06-530769-4
4	May 9, 2023	978-4-06-531828-7
5	August 8, 2023	978-4-06-532792-0
6	November 9, 2023	978-4-06-533735-6
7	March 8, 2024	978-4-06-535109-3
8	July 9, 2024	978-4-06-536245-7
9	November 8, 2024	978-4-06-537216-6
10	April 9, 2025	978-4-06-538759-7
11	September 9, 2025	978-4-06-540418-8
12	March 9, 2026	978-4-06-542244-1
13	August 7, 2026	978-4-06-544289-0

=== Anime ===
An anime television series adaptation was announced on August 7, 2026. The series will produced by Voil and directed by Kōichi Hatsumi, with Seiko Takagi handling series composition, Masashi Kudo designing the characters, and Yuki Hayashi, Yuki Furuhashi and Hayato composing the music. It is set to premiere in 2027.
