= Witch and Hound =

Japanese dark fantasy light novel series

- First light novel volume cover

魔女と猟犬 (Majo to Ryōken)
- Genre: Dark fantasy
- Light novel
- Written by: Rainy Kamitsuki
- Illustrated by: Lam
- Published by: Shogakukan
- Imprint: Gagaga Bunko
- Original run: October 21, 2020 – present
- Volumes: 6
- Manga
- Written by: Rainy Kamitsuki
- Illustrated by: Minori Tsukahara
- Published by: Square Enix
- English publisher: NA: Yen Press
- Imprint: Gangan Comics UP!
- Magazine: Manga Up!
- Original run: May 18, 2023 – July 4, 2025
- Volumes: 4
- Anime television series
- Directed by: Takanori Tsujimoto
- Written by: Jun Tsugita; Rainy Kamitsuki
- Music by: Yuki Hayashi
- Studio: TriF Studio
- icon

Witch and Hound (Japanese: 魔女と猟犬, Hepburn: Majo to Ryōken) is a Japanese light novel series written by Rainy Kamitsuki and illustrated by Lam. It began publication under Shogakukan's Gagaga Bunko imprint in October 2020; six volumes have been published as of December 2024. A manga adaptation illustrated by Minori Tsukahara was serialized on Square Enix's Manga Up! web service from May 2023 to July 2025, with its chapters compiled into four volumes between March 2024 and August 2025. An anime television series adaptation produced by TriF Studio has been announced.

== Plot ==
The Kingdom of Amelia, ruled by its eponymous queen, has become a feared power known for its strength and use of magic. This threatens the existence of the kingdom of Campusfellow, known for its weapons industry. Following reports about a witch known as the Mirror Witch causing a massacre in the nearby kingdom of Levee, Bud Grace sets off with a group, including Rollo Duvel, to find seven witches who could help protect Campusfellow from the rise of Amelia.

== Characters ==
Rollo Duvel (ロロ・デュベル, Roro Dyuberu) / Black Dog
A young man and assassin who participates in the quest to protect Campusfellow.
Delirium Grace (デリリウム・グレース, Deririumu Gurēsu)
Bud's only daughter and one of Rollo's companions.
Bud Grace (バド・グレース, Bado Gurēsu)
A lord from the kingdom of Campusfellow, who wants to protect it from the rise of Amelia.

== Development ==
Rainy Kamitsuki, a novelist from Okinawa Prefecture, originally moved to Tokyo to pursue film making, but started writing novels after being unable to find work. They made their debut in October 2011 with the release of their novel Kōshite Kare wa Okujō o Moyasu Koto ni Shita (こうして彼は屋上を燃やすことにした) after winning an award from Shogakukan's Gagaga Bunko imprint. They initially started working on Witch and Hound after completing their light novel series Nanoka no Kuigumi (七日の喰い神). The initial concept for the series came after dreaming about witches on broomsticks flying around dinosaurs. After this, they originally wanted to name the series after dinosaurs, but the idea was rejected by their editor. Ultimately, they decided on ryōken (猟犬; 'hunting dog') instead.

Kamitsuki continued working on the plot, scrapping multiple drafts and ideas. At some point, their original plan for a series about bringing together witches had instead resembled a "fighting for the throne" plot similar to Game of Thrones, resulting in fourteen drafts before the final concept was finally approved. In addition to Game of Thrones, which they had become a fan of during the series' conceptualization, the series was also inspired by fairy tales, a common influence in their work. The Mirror Witch herself had been inspired by notable cats from fantasy stories, such as the titular cat in Puss in Boots and the Cheshire Cat from Alice in Wonderland. Developing Rollo Duvel, the protagonist, proved to be a challenge, with Kamitsuki thinking of various personalities for him.

The artist Lam illustrated the novels' cover and illustrations. The two initially met while working on the video game Altdeus: Beyond Chronos, with Kamitsuki offering him to illustrate the series after he expressed an interest in working on light novels.

== Media ==
=== Light novels ===
Written by Rainy Kamitsuki and illustrated by Lam, the series is published by Shogakukan under their Gagaga Bunko imprint. The first volume was released on October 21, 2020; six volumes have been released as of December 18, 2024. The novels are available in English on Shogakukan's Novelous service.

No.	Release date	ISBN
1	October 21, 2020	978-4-09-451864-1
2	June 18, 2021	978-4-09-453009-4
3	June 17, 2022	978-4-09-453070-4
4	May 18, 2023	9784--09-453115-2
5	March 18, 2024	978-4-09-453184-8
6	December 18, 2024	978-4-09-453225-8

=== Manga ===
A manga adaptation illustrated by Minori Tsukahara was serialized on Square Enix's Manga Up! web service from May 18, 2023, to July 4, 2025. Four tankōbon volumes were released between March 15, 2024, and August 6, 2025. The manga is licensed in English by Yen Press, which will release its first English volume on November 24, 2026.

No.	Original release date	Original ISBN	North American release date	North American ISBN
1	March 15, 2024	978-4-7575-9111-0	November 24, 2026	979-8-8554-3492-7
2	March 15, 2024	978-4-7575-9112-7	—	—
3	December 18, 2024	978-4-7575-9577-4	—	—
4	August 6, 2025	978-4-7575-9985-7	—	—

=== Anime ===
An anime television series adaptation was announced on July 2, 2026. It will be produced by TriF Studio and directed by Takanori Tsujimoto, with Okamoto serving as assistant director, Kamitsuki handling the series composition with Jun Tsugita, Kengo Saitō designing the characters, and Yuki Hayashi composing the music.

== Reception ==
The series ranked in a 2024 poll by Anime! Anime! about light novels that readers wished to see adapted into an anime.
