= A Mangaka's Weirdly Wonderful Workplace =

Japanese manga series

- First tankōbon volume cover

笑顔のたえない職場です。 (Egao no Taenai Shokuba Desu.)
- Genre: Comedy; Yuri
- Manga
- Written by: Kuzushiro
- Published by: Kodansha
- Imprint: KC Deluxe
- Magazine: Comic Days
- Original run: May 18, 2019 – present
- Volumes: 15
- Anime television series
- Directed by: Kaoru Suzuki
- Written by: Mio Inoue
- Music by: Kei Haneoka; Hironori Doi
- Studio: Voil
- Licensed by: Crunchyroll
- Original network: AT-X, Tokyo MX, mit, BS Asahi
- Original run: October 6, 2025 – December 29, 2025
- Episodes: 13
- icon

A Mangaka's Weirdly Wonderful Workplace (Japanese: 笑顔のたえない職場です。, Hepburn: Egao no Taenai Shokuba Desu.; lit. 'This is a Workplace Where You Can't Help But Smile.') is a Japanese manga series written and illustrated by Kuzushiro. It was initially published as a one-shot comic in Kodansha's josei manga magazine Kiss in February 2019. It later began serialization on Kodansha's Comic Days manga website in May 2019. An anime television series adaptation produced by Voil aired from October to December 2025.

== Plot ==
Nana Futami is a fledgling mangaka who has recently started serialization of her first manga series, Dear Subaru. As this is her first series, she finds it difficult to cope with her work as a mangaka, missing deadlines and feeling nervous about her work. To make matters worse, she has begun to neglect her health, gaining weight and developing delusions. However, through her colleagues, including her assistant Mizuki Hazama and editor Kaede Satō, Nana learns to overcome her low self-esteem and enjoy her work.

== Characters ==
Nana Futami (双見 奈々, Futami Nana)
Voiced by: Yūko Natsuyoshi
The main protagonist. A young mangaka who authors Dear Subaru, a shogi-themed manga centered around a teenage boy. Although a talented mangaka, Futami is generally a nervous wreck who overcomplicates situations, so she needs sense talked into her by Mizuki. Futami has a more serious side to her when she focuses on her manga and has new ideas to try. She is in love with Satō, who loves her back.
Kaede Satō (佐藤 楓, Satō Kaede)
Voiced by: Sora Amamiya
Kaede is Futami's current editor. She's the polar opposite of Toda, being generally a much more supportive editor who believes any idea can flourish if properly developed. Although she has a serious outward demeanour she's very kind. She is in love with Futami, who loves her back.
Mizuki Hazama (間 瑞希, Hazama Mizuki)
Voiced by: Miku Itō
Futami's main assistant, who regularly playing the straight-role for Futami whenever she's overcomplicates matters. Mizuki is very diligent in her work and is usually the one that tries to make Futami focused. She wanted to be a mangaka, but realized she didn't have enough talent for it, questioning herself. Soon after Futami asked her to be her assistant, to which she happily accepted. She's the younger sister of Yuzuki.
Arisa Nashida (梨田 ありさ, Nashida Arisa)
Voiced by: Yū Kobayashi
Futami's co-worker and senior assistant from the time they worked under Takizawa, and a fellow professional mangaka. After her work was terminated by Toda, she came to reside in Futami's apartment. She generally vents her frustrations through drinking. Although a good person, Nashida can be complicated at times which annoys Mizuki. Nashida became the basis for a rival character in Futami's manga.She is in love with Toko.
Toko Kakunodate (角館 塔子, Kakunodate Tōko)
Voiced by: Eriko Matsui
A professional shogi player and the advisor for Dear Subaru. She's shown to be cheerful and respectful of Futami's work as a mangaka.
Nekonote (ねこのて)
Voiced by: Miharu Hanai
Futami's second assistant. She's a high-school girl who works remotely as she's from another region. Nekonote is a very shy person, but is happy and grateful to work for Futami. She's noted to be very skilled and work fast in her art.
Shiori Asakura (浅倉 栞, Asakura Shiori)
Voiced by: Iori Saeki
Kaede's subordinate.
Ren Takizawa (滝沢 蓮, Takizawa Ren)
Voiced by: Mamiko Noto
A popular mangaka and the mentor of Futami and Nashida who both worked as her assistants. She supports both their work as mangaka. A spin-off of her work was passed onto Nashida.
Wakako Tatsunami (立浪 和歌子, Tatsunami Wakako)
Voiced by: Kikuko Inoue
The editor-in-chief of the magazine that publishes Dear Subaru and Kaede's boss. She's an avid fan of Futami and supports her work.
Yuzuki Hazama (間 柚希, Hazama Yuzuki)
Voiced by: Saori Hayami
Futami's former classmate from their school years and her best friend. Although she isn't into manga, she does buy and read Futami's Dear Subaru. She's the older sister of Mizuki and a massage therapist.
Nagomi Hayachine (早池峰 和, Hayachine Nagomi)
Voiced by: Sumire Uesaka
Masayuki Toda (戸田 昌行, Toda Masayuki)
Voiced by: Jun Fukuyama
An editor for the same magazine as Kaede and a coworker. He's infamous for being inflexible, unsupportive and forcing his ideas upon the mangaka under his charge, for which nearly all authors under him vehemently dislike him.

== Media ==
=== Manga ===
Written and illustrated by Kuzushiro, A Mangaka's Weirdly Wonderful Workplace was initially published as a one-shot in Kodansha's josei manga magazine Kiss on February 25, 2019. It later began serialization on Kodansha's Comic Days manga website on May 18 the same year. Its chapters have been collected into fifteen tankōbon volumes as of June 2026.

No.	Release date	ISBN
1	December 25, 2019	978-4-06-517985-7
2	October 14, 2020	978-4-06-521055-0
3	April 14, 2021	978-4-06-522939-2
4	October 20, 2021	978-4-06-525090-7
5	March 18, 2022	978-4-06-527108-7
6	September 20, 2022	978-4-06-529120-7
7	March 20, 2023	978-4-06-531076-2
8	August 18, 2023	978-4-06-532700-5
9	January 18, 2024	978-4-06-534303-6
10	June 19, 2024	978-4-06-535921-1
11	November 20, 2024	978-4-06-537615-7
12	April 18, 2025	978-4-06-539234-8
13	September 19, 2025	978-4-06-540970-1
14	January 20, 2026	978-4-06-542155-0
15	June 19, 2026	978-4-06-543831-2
16	December 18, 2026	978-4-06-546109-9

=== Anime ===
An anime television series adaptation was announced on January 18, 2024. It is produced by Voil and directed by Kaoru Suzuki, with Mio Inoue handling series composition, Kana Miyai designing the characters and Kei Haneoka and Hironori Doi composing the music. The series aired from October 6 to December 29, 2025, on AT-X and other networks. The opening theme song is "Zettai Shōsan!" (絶対称賛！; lit. 'Absolute Praise!') by HoneyWorks featuring HaKoniwalily, and the ending theme song is "Thankful" performed by Sizuk. Crunchyroll is streaming the series.

==== Episodes ====
No.	Title	Directed by	Written by	Storyboarded by	Original release date
1	"A Certain Mangaka and Her Editor"; Transliteration: "Toaru Mangaka to Henshū Desu" (Japanese: とある漫画家と編集です。)	Shōhei Yamanaka	Mio Inoue	Mitsuko Kase	October 6, 2025
2	"She's a Truly Dependable Assistant"; Transliteration: "Shinsoko Tayoreru Ashi-san Desu" (Japanese: 心底頼れるアシさんです。)	Yūya Kanbe & Shōhei Yamanaka	Mio Inoue	Atsushi Ōtsuki	October 13, 2025
3	"I'm So Swamped, I'd Even Take Help from a Cat"; Transliteration: "Neko no Te mo Karitai Jōkyō Desu" (Japanese: 猫の手も借りたい状況です。)	Yūya Kanbe	Shinichi Inotsume	Shōhei Yamanaka	October 20, 2025
4	"It's a Job I Can't Do Alone"; Transliteration: "Hitori ja Dekinai Shigoto Desu" (Japanese: 一人じゃできない仕事です。)	Satoshi Toba	Misaki Morie	Satoshi Toba	October 27, 2025
5	"My Senpai Calls Herself My Rival"; Transliteration: "Senpai wa Jishō Raibaru Desu" (Japanese: 先輩は自称ライバルです。)	Shōhei Yamanaka	Misaki Morie	Atsushi Ōtsuki	November 3, 2025
6	"It's a Strange Dynamic Between the Three of Us"; Transliteration: "Fushigi na Sankaku Kankei Desu" (Japanese: 不思議な三角関係です。)	Masato Miyoshi	Mio Inoue	Noriyo Sasaki	November 10, 2025
7	"I Didn't See It Coming"; Transliteration: "Sōtei Shitenai Tenkai Desu" (Japanese: 想定してない展開です。)	Yūya Kanbe	Natsumi Shirato	Yūya Kanbe	November 17, 2025
8	"This Is Also Part of a Mangaka's Work"; Transliteration: "Kore mo Mangaka no Shigoto Desu" (Japanese: これも漫画家の仕事です。)	Shōhei Yamanaka	Shinichi Inotsume	Shōhei Yamanaka	November 24, 2025
9	"A Treasure I Found on a Walk"; Transliteration: "Sanpo de Mitsuketa Otakara Desu" (Japanese: 散歩で見つけたお宝です。)	Mamiko Sekiya	Natsumi Shirato	Masato Takayanagi	December 1, 2025
10	"Let's Take a Day Off Work for a Change"; Transliteration: "Tamani wa Oshigoto Yasumimasu" (Japanese: たまにはお仕事休みます。)	Shōhei Yamanaka	Mio Inoue	Atsushi Ōtsuki	December 8, 2025
11	"It's Important to Actually Experience It"; Transliteration: "Taiken Suru no wa Taisetsu Desu" (Japanese: 体験するのは大切です。)	Satoshi Toba	Misaki Morie	Yoshiharu Ashino	December 15, 2025
12	"I'm So Glad I Kept Going! I'm So Touched"; Transliteration: "Kaitete Yokatta! Kandō Desu" (Japanese: 描いててよかった！感動です。)	Masato Miyoshi	Shinichi Inotsume	Masato Takayanagi	December 22, 2025
13	"A Mangaka's Weirdly Wonderful Workplace"; Transliteration: "Egao no Taenai Shokuba Desu" (Japanese: 笑顔のたえない職場です。)	Kaoru Suzuki	Mio Inoue	Atsushi Ōtsuki	December 29, 2025
