= Kuzushiro =

Japanese manga artist

- くずしろ
- Born: Iwate Prefecture, Japan
- Occupation: Manga artist
- Writing career
- Pen name: Hajime Katsuragi
- Language: Japanese
- Period: 2009–present
- Notable work: Inugami-san to Nekoyama-san; A Mangaka's Weirdly Wonderful Workplace; The Moon on a Rainy Night
- Website: Official website

Kuzushiro (くずしろ), also known as Hajime Katsuragi (葛城一, Katsuragi Hajime), is a Japanese manga artist. She is known for her works Inugami-san to Nekoyama-san and A Mangaka's Weirdly Wonderful Workplace, which received anime television series adaptations in 2014 and 2025 respectively. An anime adaptation of her series The Moon on a Rainy Night has been announced.

== Career ==
=== Early years ===
In her third year of high school, Kuzushiro submitted a work to a contest and won a small award. Later, while attending university, she became an assistant for a weekly manga series, and would sometimes stay at her workplace and work through the night. She described the experience as enjoyable and one that contributed to her eventually becoming a manga artist as a career. Throughout university, she drew manga with the hope of making her professional debut before graduating, a goal which she accomplished in her fourth year.

In December 2007, under the name Hajime Katsuragi, she received an Honorable Mention in the 61st Shogakukan Newcomer Comic Awards for the short shōnen manga "BBC".

=== Professional career ===
Kuzushiro made her professional debut in April 2009 with the publication of the one-shot story lit. 'Inugami-san and Nekoyama-san' (神さんと猫山さん, "Inugami-san to Nekoyama-san") in Manga Life Selection Munko Special. She later expanded the story into a full series also titled Inugami-san to Nekoyama-san, which began running in Ichijinsha's Comic Yuri Hime in November 2011., The manga series was adapted into a short anime television series that premiered in April 2014. It concluded in February 2017 with six tankōbon volumes published in total.

In March 2010, Kuzushiro launched lit. 'I Would Die for Your Sake, My Lady' (姫のためなら死ねる, Kimino Tamenara Shineru) in Takeshobo's Manga Life Win. The series concluded with the release of its fourteenth and final tankōbon volume in April 2024.

Kuzushiro began Living With My Brother's Wife in Square Enix's Young Gangan magazine in December 2015. In 2017, the series placed fifteenth in the print category of the Next Manga Awards. Its sixteenth and final tankōbon volume was published in March 2025.

In February 2019, Kuzushiro published a one-shot in Kodansha's Kiss magazine, which later was expanded into the serialized manga A Mangaka's Weirdly Wonderful Workplace on Kodansha's Comic Days website in May 2019. An anime television series adaptation aired from October to December 2025. As of July 2026, the series has been collected into fifteen tankōbon volumes.

In April 2019, Kuzushiro began serializing lit. 'How to Fight for the Lifetime Girl's Grandmaster' (永世乙女の戦い方, Eisei Otome no Tatakai-kata) in Shogakukan's Big Comic Superior. As of July 2026, the series has been collected into fifteen tankōbon volumes.

In June 2021, Kuzushiro started publishing The Moon on a Rainy Night on Comic Days. The series was nominated for the Next Manga Awards in the digital category in 2022 and 2023. An anime television series adaptation was announced in November 2024, with a key visual and short interview with Kuzushiro being released in December 2025. As of July 2026, the series has been collected into twelve tankōbon volumes.

== Style and influences ==
As a child, Kuzushiro enjoyed reading picture books and inventing her own stories, often imagining alternative possibilities when she disliked a certain plot development. She cited Mitsuru Adachi's H2 and Yoshio Sawai's Bobobo-bo Bo-bobo as works that influenced her decision to become a manga artist. She also read shōjo manga magazines such as Ribon that her older sister bought, which sparked a desire to draw similar works.

Many of Kuzushiro's characters are inspired by people she has encountered in her own life. However, she also draws from a variety of literature, including documentaries, essays, nonfiction, and I-novels, to better understand different perspectives on the world. She has stated that in every work she creates, she includes at least one character with a strong sense of morality to ground the story, preventing readers from becoming annoyed by other characters' problematic behavior.

Kuzushiro's work typically goes through four stages: storyboards, rough sketches, inking, and finishing. She receives assistance with the last two stages. She often begins drawing storyboards before completing her character designs, an approach that she feels other manga artists might find surprising.

In a 2025 interview, Kuzushiro said that her idea of a good drawing is one where the audience can immediately recognize its author, rather than one which is just skillfully created.

== Personal life ==
Kuzushiro was born in Iwate Prefecture. In interviews and other public appearances, Kuzushiro prefers to be represented in photographs by a large stuffed animal based on a sketch she drew in high school.

Kuzushiro described herself as naturally "gloomy", (Note: "暗い", lit. 'dark') which she felt is reflected to an extent in her works. She tries to remain mindful of this and avoid emphasizing this tendency too strongly. She has stated that she struggles with motivation sometimes, which she overcomes by relying on support from her assistants and editors as well as enjoying her favorite music or movies.

Kuzushiro is a fan of the idol group Shiritsu Ebisu Chugaku, with an incident involving one of the group's members influencing her development of The Moon on a Rainy Night. She also enjoys comedy films and often incorporates a straight man role into her works.

== Works ==
All release dates are for tankōbon volumes.

- Kimino Tamenara Shineru (姫のためなら死ねる) (14 volumes, 2011–2024, Takeshobo)
- Gekibu no (げきぶの。) (3 volumes, 2011–2013, Square Enix)
- Lasboss x Hero (4 volumes, 2012–2014, Shogakukan) (Note: Under the name Hajime Katsuragi.)
- Inugami-san to Nekoyama-san (神さんと猫山さん) (6 volumes, 2013–2017, Ichijinsha)
- Living With My Brother's Wife (兄の嫁と暮らしています。, Ani no Yome to Kurashiteimasu) (16 volumes, 2016–2025, Square Enix)
- A Mangaka's Weirdly Wonderful Workplace (笑顔のたえない職場です。, Egao no Taenai Shokuba Desu) (15 volumes, 2019–present, Kodansha)
- Eisei Otome no Tatakai-kata (永世乙女の戦い方) (15 volumes, 2019–present, Shogakukan)
- Akuma no Mama (あくまのまま) (2 volumes, 2019–?, Square Enix)
- The Moon on a Rainy Night (雨夜の月, Amayo no Tsuki) (12 volumes, 2021–present, Kodansha)
