= Acro Trip =

Japanese manga series

- First tankōbon volume cover, featuring Chrome Kurozane

アクロトリップ (Akuro Torippu)
- Genre: Comedy; Magical girl
- Manga
- Written by: Yone Sawata
- Published by: Shueisha
- Imprint: Ribon Mascot Comics
- Magazine: Ribon
- Original run: February 3, 2017 – December 1, 2022
- Volumes: 5
- Anime television series
- Directed by: Ayumu Kotake
- Written by: Shinichi Inotsume
- Music by: Technoboys Pulcraft Green-Fund
- Studio: Voil
- Licensed by: Crunchyroll
- Original network: Tokyo MX, BS NTV, AT-X
- Original run: October 2, 2024 – December 18, 2024
- Episodes: 12
- icon

Acro Trip (Japanese: アクロトリップ, Hepburn: Akuro Torippu) is a Japanese manga series written and illustrated by Yone Sawata. It was serialized in Shueisha's shōjo manga magazine Ribon from February 2017 to December 2022, with its chapters collected in five tankōbon volumes. An anime television series adaptation produced by Voil aired from October to December 2024.

== Plot ==
Chizuko Date has always admired her hero, Berry Blossom, a magical girl who protects Niigata City from the Evil Organization Fossa Magna, led by Chrome. However, Chrome is quite weak and is always defeated by Berry Blossom. As a result, the public found the battles boring and began to lose interest. This led Chizuko to try and bring back attention to Berry Blossom, but she was also approached by Chrome to join his organization, much to her concern.

== Characters ==
Chizuko Date (伊達 地図子, Date Chizuko)
Voiced by: Miku Itō (PV, anime)
A dull girl without any interests in life who discovers a passion for magical girls after witnessing a fight between Chroma and Berry Blossom. She is later approached by Chroma, who invites her onto the path of evil, believing she would be a good ally. After an initial refusal, she eventually accepts, aiming to revive the disgraced image of his heroine. She lives alone with her grandfather.
Chrome Kurozane (玄実クロマ, Kurozane Kuroma)
Voiced by: Nobunaga Shimazaki
Berry Blossom (ベリーブロッサム, Berī Burossamu) / Kaju Noichigo (乃苺 佳寿, Noichigo Kaju)
Voiced by: Inori Minase
Mashirou (マシロウ, Mashirō)
Voiced by: Kengo Kawanishi
Baryū Ōmizo (大溝芭隆, Ōmizo Baryū)
Voiced by: Showtaro Morikubo
Kokoa (心亜)
Voiced by: Miharu Hanai
Tsuki (月)
Voiced by: Chiharu Sawashiro
Hugh (ヒュー, Hyū)
Voiced by: Takehito Koyasu
Ojii-chan (おじいちゃん) / Suikyō Date (伊達翠京, Date Suikyō)
Voiced by: Kōichi Sōma
Kuma Kaijin (クマ怪人)
Voiced by: Yuji Kameyama

== Media ==
=== Manga ===
Written and illustrated by Yone Sawata, Acro Trip was serialized in Shueisha's shōjo manga magazine Ribon from February 3, 2017, to December 1, 2022; it was Sawata's first serialized work. Shueisha collected its chapters in five tankōbon volumes, released from April 25, 2018, to January 25, 2023. A three-chapter "revival" serialization, to commemorate the release of the anime adaptation, ran in Ribon from October 3 to December 3, 2024.

==== Volumes ====
No.	Release date	ISBN
1	April 25, 2018	978-4-08-867498-8
2	April 25, 2019	978-4-08-867546-6
3	July 22, 2020	978-4-08-867583-1
4	February 25, 2022	978-4-08-867667-8
5	January 25, 2023	978-4-08-867698-2

=== Anime ===
An anime television series adaptation was announced on December 1, 2022. It is produced by Voil and directed by Ayumu Kotake, with scripts supervised by Shinichi Inotsume, character designs by Toshie Kawamura, and music composed by Technoboys Pulcraft Green-Fund. The series aired from October 2 to December 18, 2024, on Tokyo MX and BS NTV. (Note: From Episode 2 onwards, episodes are released on Fuji on Demand (FOD) and Crunchyroll one week before their televised airings.) The opening theme song is "Fragum" (フラーグム, Furāgumu; Latin for strawberry), performed by Inori Minase, while the ending theme song is "Reversible Baby" (リバーシブルベイベー, Ribāshiburu Beibē), performed by KanoeRana. Crunchyroll streamed the series.

==== Episodes ====
No.	Title	Directed by	Written by	Storyboarded by	Original release date
1	"Beginning Encounter"; Transliteration: "Hajimari Enkaunto" (Japanese: はじまりエンカウント)	Ayumu Kotake & Shige Fukase	Shinichi Inotsume	Ayumu Kotake	October 2, 2024
The girl Chizuko Date is going to spend a week at her grandfather's place in Niigata City while her mother takes care of some work stuff, in the distance two people are in a chase. Chizuko and her grandfather goes to the mall and Chizuko is going to be alone as her grandfather goes to help his friend, she meets a girl and her cat who Chizuko noticed made a weird noise. As Chizuko walks home she then sees the same people who fight under the bridge, a villain and a magical girl, this impression makes Chizuko ask her grandfather to live with him and asks her mother for permission. After school Chizuko sees the news about Berry Blossom; the magical girl protecting Naniga City which Chizuko becomes a fan of her, Berry fights the evil mastermind Chrome and the battle turns out to be lame. Chizuko says Chrome does not any tactics or plans, saying if he is evil makes it more interesting battle and then realize that Chrome is behind her. Chrome tells Chizuko that way back he chose this place as target of his evil deeds, but it was petty acts, he realized he enjoys being defeated by Berry Blossom's attacks, what they both have in common is they both love Berry Blossom. Chrome says at this rate the Evil Organization Fossa Magna will soon be no more, he suggest in order for him and Berry to continue fighting is that Chizuko joins the Fossa Magna council, but Chizuko runs off. After school Chizuko thinks the whole thing was a dream and goes to a convenience store, but finds Chrome and realize it was not a dream.
2	"Go To the Path of Evil"; Transliteration: "Gō Tū Aku no Michi" (Japanese: ゴートゥー悪の道)	Yasunori Gotō	Shinichi Inotsume	Yasunori Gotō	October 9, 2024
Chrome works at the store and asks Chizuko about joining him but she stil refuses, but then a robber comes to the store. The girl from the mall happens to be there and transforms into her Berry Blossom form, Chizuko excited to see Berry to use her magic but she instead uses physical strength against the robber, Chrome explains that it is forbidden to use magic against an ordinary person, magic is cast on magical girls and common criminal affairs are directed to the police. Chrome says Berry only uses her power when facing the Fossa Magna and if Chizuko wishes to see it more she must join, in an ally are Berry and the cat Mashirou talking about not meddling with ordinary people. Chizuko comes home from school only to find Chrome there and he warps himself and Chizuko to the Fossa Magna base, he shows Chizuko around that the base was created by magic and they go inside a closet but a broom blocks the door, Chizuko says he can teleport them out but Chrome says his magic has a limit and cannot use it more until the next month, he says Chizuko have to sign a contract so she can use magic and she signs. As Chizuko tries to open the door her grandfather opens it and wonders why he is here, her grandfather says he come from above and the base turns out be located under the house, he says he took Chrome home and gave him the crawl space which Chrome created the base. Chrome teleports them all up and Chizuko realize Chrome lied to her and she actually signed the contract to join the organization.
3	"Moshi-Moshi to My Oshi"; Transliteration: "Oshi ni Moshi-Moshi" (Japanese: 推しにもしもし)	Shige Fukase & Yusuke Onoda	Mio Inoue	Yoshiharu Ashino	October 16, 2024
4	"Soaked on a Rainy Day"; Transliteration: "Zubu Nure Reinīdei" (Japanese: ずぶぬれレイニーデイ)	Taketomo Ishikawa	Natsumi Shirato	Taketomo Ishikawa	October 23, 2024
5	"Ominous Unknowns"; Transliteration: "Anun Anno Un" (Japanese: 暗雲アンノウン)	Shige Fukase	Mio Inoue	Shige Fukase	October 30, 2024
6	"Hocus de Lawless"; Transliteration: "Mahō DE Muhō" (Japanese: 魔法DE無法)	Yusuke Onoda	Shinichi Inotsume	Hiroshi Kōjina	November 6, 2024
7	"Mashima-kun and Kurozane-kun"; Transliteration: "Mashima-kun to Kurozane-kun" (Japanese: 眞嶋くんと玄実くん)	Kaoru Suzuki	Natsumi Shirato	Kaoru Suzuki & Mikage	November 13, 2024
8	"Picking Fights, Pensively Reunite"; Transliteration: "Ichamon Monmon" (Japanese: いちゃもん悶々)	Yasunori Gotō	Shinichi Inotsume	Yasunori Gotō	November 20, 2024
9	"Wannabe Hip Evil"; Transliteration: "Wanabīi Teru Aku" (Japanese: ワナビーイケてる悪)	Yoshihiko Iwata	Mio Inoue	Noriyo Sasaki	November 27, 2024
10	"Giant Reception"; Transliteration: "Jaianto Chakuden" (Japanese: ジャイアント着電)	Shigehito Takayanagi	Natsumi Shirato	Shigehito Takayanagi	December 4, 2024
11	"Sudden Stranger"; Transliteration: "Battari Sutorenjā" (Japanese: ばったりストレンジャー)	Shige Fukase	Shinichi Inotsume	Kazutaka Muraki	December 11, 2024
12	"Bad Meets Girl"; Transliteration: "Aku Michi Mītsu Gāru" (Japanese: 悪路ミーツガール)	Tsuyoshi Nakano & Ayumu Kotake	Shinichi Inotsume	Yoshiharu Ashino & Yū Shinoda	December 18, 2024

== Reception ==
The manga was recommended by manga artist Aka Akasaka.

The anime entry in The Encyclopedia of Science Fiction stated that, although the animation was unremarkable, Acro Trip functioned as a humorous and affectionate parody of the magical girl genre, marked by considerable absurdity.
