= Manao Kagawa =

Japanese shogi player

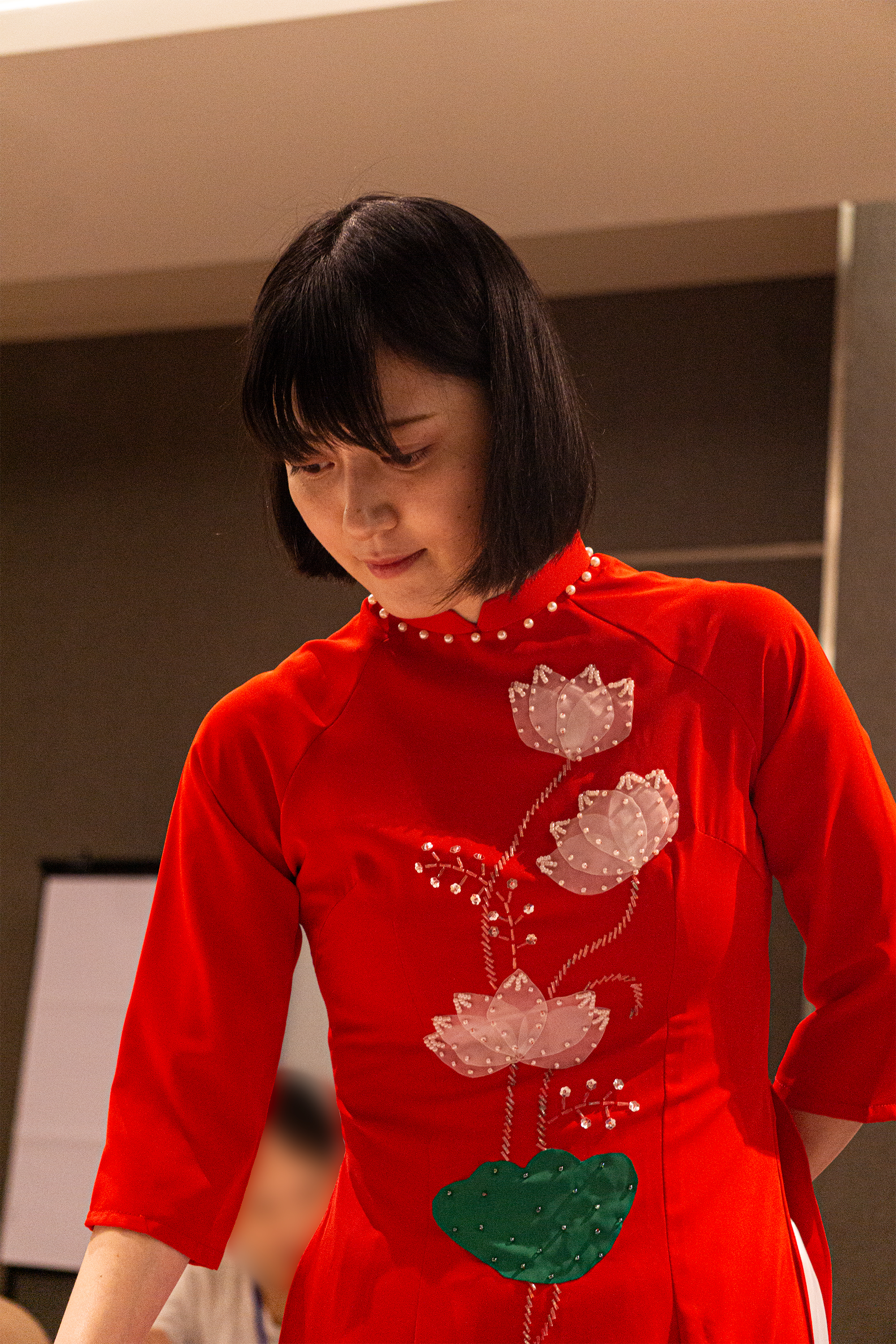
- Native name: 香川愛生
- Born: April 16, 1993 (age 33)
- Hometown: Chōfu, Tokyo

Career
- Achieved professional status: October 1, 2008 (aged 15)
- Badge number: W-40
- Rank: Women's 4-dan
- Teacher: Osamu Nakamura (9-dan)
- Major titles won: 2

Websites
- JSA profile page

Manao Kagawa (香川 愛生, Kagawa Manao; born April 16, 1993) in Chōfu, Tokyo is a Japanese women's professional shogi player ranked 4-dan. She is a former Women's Ōshō title holder.

== Women's shogi professional ==
Kagawa challenged Tomoka Nishiyama for the Women's Ōshō title in October 2023, but lost the 45th Women's Osho title match 2 games to none.

=== Promotion history ===
Kagawa has been promoted as follows.

- 2-kyū: October 1, 2008
- 1-kyū: July 25, 2009
- 1-dan: November 28, 2012
- 2-dan: August 29, 2013
- 3-dan: October 23, 2013
- 4-dan: January 21, 2021

Note: All ranks are women's professional ranks.

=== Major titles ===
Kagawa has appeared in major title matches five times and has won a total of two titles. She won the Women's Ōshō title in 2013 and then successfully defended it in 2014.

=== Awards and honors ===
Kagawa received the Japan Shogi Association Annual Shogi Award "Women's Professional Most Games Played" in 2013 and the "Women's Professional Award" in 2014.

=== Video game ===
On March 25, 2021, SilverStar Japan released Kagawa Manao to Futari de Shogi (香川愛生とふたりで将棋, Shogi with Manao Kagawa) for the Nintendo Switch. The game was endorsed and features Kagawa.

== Personal life ==
Kagawa graduated from Ritsumeikan University in 2017.
