= Pung =

Pung may refer to:

- Pung, a term used in Mahjong to indicate a set of three tiles
- Pung, a drum used in Pung cholom, Manipuri dance form
- Pung, a term used in New England for a low, one-horse sleigh with a box-shaped body
- Pung Island, a small populated island on the Yellow Sea

People:

- Alice Pung, lawyer, the editor of Growing Up Asian in Australia and author of Unpolished Gem
- Buyeo Pung (fl. 7th century), one of the sons of King Uija of Baekje
- Jackie Pung (1921–2017), American professional golfer who played on the LPGA Tour
- Mihkel Pung (1876–1941), Estonian politician

== See also ==
- Ping Pung, Hong Kong–based Cantonese pop-rock group
- Pung cholom, Manipuri dance
- Ta Pung, khum (commune) of Thma Koul District in Battambang Province in north-western Cambodia
