= Love Unseen Beneath the Clear Night Sky =

Japanese light novel series and its adaptations

- First light novel volume cover

透明な夜に駆ける君と、目に見えない恋をした。 (Tōmei na Yoru ni Kakeru kimi to, Me ni Mienai Koi o Shita)
- Genre: Romantic drama Tragedy
- Light novel
- Written by: Nanigashi Shima
- Illustrated by: Raemz
- Published by: SB Creative
- English publisher: NA: Yen Press
- Imprint: GA Bunko
- Original run: August 10, 2023 – August 9, 2024
- Volumes: 2
- Light novel

When the Sun Rises, The Night Ends
- Written by: Nanigashi Shima
- Illustrated by: Raemz
- Published by: SB Creative
- Imprint: GA Bunko
- Original run: August 9, 2024 – present
- Volumes: 2
- Manga
- Written by: Nanigashi Shima
- Illustrated by: Hat
- Published by: Square Enix
- English publisher: NA: Square Enix
- Imprint: Gangan Comics UP!
- Magazine: Manga Up!
- Original run: August 9, 2024 – present
- Volumes: 1
- Television drama
- Directed by: Ryōma Kosasa; Takeshi Matsuura
- Written by: Kento Gotō; Mihiro Tomiyasu
- Music by: Shunya Watanabe
- Studio: Storyboard
- Original network: MBS, tvk, Chiba TV, Teletama
- Original run: December 11, 2025 – February 5, 2026
- Episodes: 8
- Anime television series
- Directed by: Joe Yoshizaki
- Written by: Yūko Kakihara
- Music by: Harumi Fuuki
- Studio: Makaria
- Licensed by: Crunchyroll: SEA: Medialink
- Original network: AT-X, Tokyo MX, MBS, BS11, tys
- Original run: July 6, 2026 – September 21, 2026
- Episodes: 12
- icon

Love Unseen Beneath the Clear Night Sky (Note: Japanese: 透明な夜に駆ける君と、目に見えない恋をした。, Hepburn: Tōmei na Yoru ni Kakeru Kimi to, Me ni Mienai Koi o Shita; lit. 'I Fell in Love with You, Who Ran Through the Transparent Night, A Love that Couldn't Be Seen') or Kakekoi (かけ恋) is a Japanese romantic light novel series written by Nanigashi Shima and illustrated by Raemz. It began publication under SB Creative's GA Bunko imprint in August 2023. A related light novel titled When the Sun Rises, The Night Ends (夜が明けたら朝が来る, Yoru ga Aketara Asa ga Kuru) was released in August 2024. A manga adaptation illustrated by Hat began serialization on Square Enix's Manga Up! service in August 2024. A live-action television drama adaptation aired from December 2025 to February 2026, and an anime television series adaptation produced by Makaria aired from July to September 2026. It has received critical acclaim for its artstyle, characters, voice acting and emotional resonance.

== Plot ==
The series follows Kakeru Sorano, a university student who meets and befriends Koharu Fuyutsuki, a fellow student. Koharu is blind, but this does not prevent Kakeru from taking care of her and working to make her happy. When Koharu says her wish is to launch fireworks, Kakeru becomes inspired to help Koharu fulfill her wishes, while also changing his own introverted personality.

== Characters ==
=== Love Unseen Beneath the Clear Night Sky ===
Kakeru Sorano (空野 かける, Sorano Kakeru)
Voiced by: Miyu Irino (PV, anime)
Portrayed by: Taiyu Fujiwara
A university student from Shimonoseki who meets Koharu during a drinking party. Initially having an introverted personality, he becomes more outgoing after meeting Koharu. Despite Koharu's blindness, he falls in love with her and becomes determined to help her however he can, even after she tries to push him away. He has a daughter with Koharu named Sakura, but is a widower following Koharu's death, with him also being diagnosed with terminal cancer, though after hearing Koharu's recording, decides to battle it.
Koharu Fuyutsuki (冬月 小春, Fuyutsuki Koharu)
Voiced by: Saori Hayami (PV, anime)
Portrayed by: Riko Nagase
A beautiful and kind university student. She became blind due to cancer, although she continues to study hard and attend university like normal. She falls in love with Kakeru and believes him to be a good man despite being unable to see him. However, as her condition worsens and she ends up back at the hospital, her mental state deteriorates as she feigns forgetting about Kakeru and the others to help distance them from what she believed to be her final days. She marries Kakeru and they have a daughter named Sakura, but dies from breast cancer at the age of 48.
Sakura Sorano (空野 咲良, Sorano Sakura)
Voiced by: Rin Mizuki (anime)
Kakeru and Koharu's daughter.
Yūko Hayase (早瀬 優子, Hayase Yūko)
Voiced by: Konomi Kohara (anime)
Portrayed by: Hana Kawamura
Koharu's friend.
Ushio Narumi (鳴海 潮, Narumi Ushio)
Voiced by: Yōhei Azakami (anime)
Portrayed by: Shunta Sono
Kakeru's roommate.

=== When the Sun Rises, The Night Ends ===
Asa (アサ)
A high school student from Moji Ward, Kitakyushu who is a big fan of the singer Yoru. Despite being tone-deaf, she aims to become a musician just like Yoru.
Yoru
A popular singer who was switched at birth with Asa. Her real name is Saya (サヤ).

== Media ==
=== Light novel ===
Written by Nanigashi Shima and illustrated by Raemz, Love Unseen Beneath the Clear Night Sky began publication under SB Creative's GA Bunko imprint in August 2023 after winning the grand prize at the GA Bunko Award earlier that year. A second novel titled Gokusai no Yoru ni Kakeru kimi to, Me ni Mienai Koi o Shita (極彩の夜に駆ける君と、目に見えない恋をした。) was released on August 9, 2024; a promotional video featuring Miyu Irino as Kakeru Sorano and Saori Hayami as Koharu Fuyutsuki was released to promote the novel's release. The series is licensed in English by Yen Press.

A related light novel titled When the Sun Rises, The Night Ends was released on August 9, 2024. A second novel titled Asa ga Kuru Made Yoru wa Matsu (朝が来るまで夜は待つ) was released on March 15, 2025.

No.	Title	Original release date	English release date
1	Love Unseen Beneath the Clear Night Sky; Tōmei na Yoru ni Kakeru Kimi to, Me ni Mienai Koi o Shita (透明な夜に駆ける君と、目に見えない恋をした。)	August 10, 2023; 978-4-8156-2145-2	January 21, 2025; 979-8-8554-0071-7
2	Love Unseen Beneath the Radiant Night Sky; Gokusai no Yoru ni Kakeru kimi to, Me ni Mienai Koi o Shita (極彩の夜に駆ける君と、目に見えない恋をした。)	August 9, 2024; 978-4-8156-2146-9	July 14, 2026; 979-8-8554-1964-1

=== Manga ===
A manga adaptation illustrated by Hat began serialization on Square Enix's Manga Up! service on August 9, 2024. The first tankōbon volume was published on July 7, 2025.

The manga adaptation' chapters are published in English on Square Enix's Manga Up! Global app.

No.	Japanese release date	Japanese ISBN
1	July 7, 2025	978-4-7575-9945-1

=== Drama ===
A live-action television drama adaptation was announced on November 14, 2025. It is produced by Storyboard, in cooperation with Tohokushinsha Film, and directed by Ryōma Kosasa and Takeshi Matsuura, with Kento Gotō and Tomiyasu Mihiro writing the screenplay, and Shunya Watanabe composing the music. The series aired from December 11, 2025, to February 5, 2026, on MBS's Drama Tokku programming block. The opening theme song is "Kesō Uta" (懸想歌), performed by Ren, while the ending theme song is "You", performed by Sarasa.

=== Anime ===
An anime television series adaptation was also announced on November 14, 2025. It is produced by Makaria and directed by Joe Yoshizaki, with series composition handled by Yūko Kakihara, characters designed by Yoshihiro Sawada and Yūzuki Ishii, and music composed by Harumi Fuuki. Miyu Irino and Saori Hayami reprised their roles from the light novel promotional video as Kakeru Sorano and Koharu Fuyutsuki respectively. The series aired from July 6 to September 21, 2026, on AT-X and other networks. The opening theme song is "Hitohira" (ひとひら), performed by Motohiro Hata, while the ending theme song is "Hikari" (光; Light), performed by Yui Sakurai of Fruits Zipper. Crunchyroll is streaming the series. Medialink licensed the series for streaming on Ani-One Asia's YouTube channel.

==== Episodes ====
No.	Title	Directed by (Note: Production staff information is taken from the ending credits of each episode.)	Written by	Storyboarded by	Original release date
1	"An Encounter"; Transliteration: "Deai" (Japanese: 出会い)	Kiseki Ohta (太田気績)	Yūko Kakihara (柿原優子)	Mitsuyoshi Yoneda (米田光良)	July 6, 2026
At a party, reserved college student Kakeru meets a mysterious and charming young woman who is unable to see.
2	"Koharu Fuyutsuki"; Transliteration: "Fuyutsuki Koharu" (Japanese: 冬月小春)	Gonsuke Kimura (木村権祐)	Yūko Kakihara (柿原優子)	Natsuto Fujiwara (藤原なつと)	July 13, 2026
Kakeru takes Koyuki to try out an old piano and the two tour a Meiji era sailboat that is preserved on campus.
3	"The Yellow Bookmark"; Transliteration: "Kiiroi Shiori" (Japanese: 黄色い栞)	Ryūta Nakano (中野龍太)	Yūko Kakihara (柿原優子)	Parkji-seung	July 20, 2026
Kakeru and Koharu go to karaoke with friends and decide to check out the university's fireworks club together.
4	"First Date"; Transliteration: "Hajimete no Dēto" (Japanese: 初めてのデート)	Tatsu Yamamoto (山本辰)	Yūko Kakihara (柿原優子)	Masaharu Watanabe (渡邊政治)	July 27, 2026
Kakeru and Koharu go on their fireworks shopping trip and then enjoy a very relaxing ride home on a water bus.
5	"Aerial Fireworks"; Transliteration: "Uchiage Hanabi" (Japanese: 打ち上げ花火)	Gonsuke Kimura (木村権祐)	Yūko Kakihara (柿原優子)	Namako Umino (海野なまこ)	August 3, 2026
Kakeru and his roommate Narumi get a chance to take Koharu and Yuko for a ride on the college's cutter boat.
6	"The Empty Terrace Seat"; Transliteration: "Kūhaku no Terasu Seki" (Japanese: 空白のテラス席)	Kiseki Ohta (太田気績)	Yūko Kakihara (柿原優子)	Mitsuyoshi Yoneda (米田光良)	August 10, 2026
Kakeru shares an intimate moment with Koharu and then turns to Narumi and Hayase for advice on how to proceed.
7	"Transparent"; Transliteration: "Tōmei" (Japanese: 透明)	Tatsu Yamamoto (山本辰)	Ikeda Yuki (池田ゆき)	Masayoshi Nishita (西田正義), Gonsuke Kimura (木村権祐)	August 17, 2026
After Koharu disappears for a week, Kakeru and Yuko get a clue about where she is and run out to look for her.
8	"Pangs of Love"; Transliteration: "Koigokoro" (Japanese: 恋心)	Kamadon (かまどん)	Hirotaka Hayatsu (早津博貴)	Parkji-seung	August 24, 2026
Hoping to spend time with Koharu, Kakeru and friends decide to volunteer at the hospital where she is staying.
9	"Alone"; Transliteration: "Hitori" (Japanese: ひとり)	Gonsuke Kimura (木村権祐)	Ikeda Yuki (池田ゆき)	Gonsuke Kimura (木村権祐)	August 31, 2026
Still volunteering at the hospital, Kakeru learns more about Koharu's illness and happens to meet her mother.
10	"Stay By Her Side"; Transliteration: "Zutto, Soba ni" (Japanese: ずっと、そばに)	Kiseki Ohta (太田気績)	Hirotaka Hayatsu (早津博貴)	Parkji-seung	September 7, 2026
Kakeru stays with Koharu through her ups and downs while Yuko takes the lead on preparing the fireworks show.
11	"Kakeru Sorano"; Transliteration: "Sorano Kakeru" (Japanese: 空野かける)	Ryūta Nakano (中野龍太)	Yūko Kakihara (柿原優子)	Namako Umino (海野なまこ)	September 14, 2026
With the fireworks event approaching, Koharu keeps working step by step toward regaining some of her strength.
12	"A Memory That Will Last a Lifetime"; Transliteration: "Isshō no Omoide" (Japanese: 一生の想い出)	Tatsu Yamamoto (山本辰), Hiroto Miyagi (宮城大翔)	Yūko Kakihara (柿原優子)	Namako Umino (海野なまこ), Parkji-seung	September 21, 2026
Kakeru and Koharu enjoy their last moments together before she gets transferred to a new hospital in Hokkaido.

== Reception ==
The series placed in multiple categories at the 2024 Kono Light Novel ga Sugoi! Awards, ranking 3rd in the New Releases category and 5th in the Paperback category.

== See also ==
- I Didn't Want to Live in This Time, another light novel series with the same author
- Chitose Is in the Ramune Bottle, another light novel series with the same illustrator
- Even a Replica Can Fall in Love, another light novel series with the same illustrator
