= Otocadoll =

2015 video game

- Developer: Konami
- Publisher: Konami
- Producer: Kiyoshi Murai
- Platform: Arcade
- Release: March 13, 2015
- Genre: Rhythm game
- Mode: Single player

Otocadoll (オトカドール, Otoka dōru) is a Japanese arcade game developed by Konami. The game consists on magical idols known as a "Dolls" who gather energy through the rhythm of songs, which is used to defeat rivals or monsters. The person is required to have a ticket that will identify them as an idol to play the game. It was released on March 13, 2015 and was in its third or fourth season at the time of its discontinuation. Periodically, new songs, outfits, and characters are released. However, the game stopped receiving updates in July 2017, and was officially discontinued on March 31, 2022.

== Gameplay ==
The objective of the game is gaining the most energy to change ranges and battle the various rivals that appear throughout the levels. This can be done by gaining various outfit pieces or items to make accessories to improve the user's Idol up. When the user has powered enough, they will have some attack options to decide which one to use and cause damage to the rival. The bigger the attack is, more energy will be used.

There are also options to change a character's color scheme, coords, accessories, weapons, and songs. Rival characters can also be unlocked and used in battle.

== Characters ==
- Ai (あい) is a bright and compassionate girl who remains hopeful against all odds that everything will work out. She loves anything adorable and can be a little absent-minded sometimes, and shown to enjoy baking. Although Ai is only capable of making the food look delicious, anyone who eats it usually gets sick. She used staffs as her weapon with her favorite brand being Heart Parade.
- Sunny (サニー, Sanī) is a little sister-type of girl known for her bright disposition and large sweet tooth. Friendly and always has a smile on her face, she is interested in pop and Western-inspired outfits. Her favorite brand is Candy Toxic with her weapon being the hammer.
- Seina (セイナ) is a ladylike girl with an air of refinement who is known for having a perfect pitch. She is also quiet and keeps herself. Her favorite brand is Marguerite Crown with her weapon being a book.
- Rose (ローズ, Rōzu) is a cool girl filled with elegance and sophistication. She loves beauty products, collecting makeup and nail polish. Her smooth, graceful movements match her sexy fashion style. Rose' favorite brand is Desert Rose and with her weapon being either a hand fan or wand.
- Lyrica (リリカ, Ririka) is a cool and helpful girl who thinks fast. She has vast knowledge on music and challenging puzzle games. Her favorite brand is Sci-Fi Girl with her weapon often being depicted as a sword or fan.
- Coco (ココ, Koko) is a delicate girl with refined and sweet behavior who possesses an innocent wonder. She enjoys drinking black tea and collecting stuffed animals. Her favorite brand is Minette with her weapon changing between a fan or wand.
