= List of slice of life anime =

This is a list of slice of life anime.

Year(s)	Title	Type	Director(s)	Studio	Ref
1979	Akage no Anne	TV series	Isao Takahata	Nippon Animation	
1981–1986	Urusei Yatsura	TV series	Mamoru Oshii, Kazuo Yamazaki	Pierrot, Studio Deen	
1985–1987	High School! Kimengumi	TV series	Hiroshi Fukutomi	Gallop, Studio Comet	
1991	Only Yesterday	Film	Isao Takahata	Studio Ghibli	
1995	Whisper of the Heart	Film	Yoshifumi Kondō	Studio Ghibli	
1998	Yokohama Kaidashi Kikou	OVA series	Takashi Annō	Ajia-do Animation Works	
1999	My Neighbors the Yamadas	Film	Isao Takahata	Studio Ghibli	
2001	Kokoro Toshokan	TV series	Koji Masunari	Studio Deen	
2002	Shrine of the Morning Mist	TV series	Yuji Moriyama	Chaos Project Gansis	
2002	Azumanga Daioh	TV series	Hiroshi Nishikiori	J.C.Staff	
2002–2003	Yokohama Kaidashi Kikou: Quiet Country Cafe	OVA series	Tomomi Mochizuki	Ajia-do Animation Works, SME Visual Works	
2005	Aria	TV series	Junichi Sato	Hal Film Maker	
2005	Strawberry Marshmallow	TV series	Takuya Sato	Daume	
2006	Bartender	TV series	Masaki Watanabe	Palm Studio	
2006	Dobutsu no Mori	Film	Jōji Shimura		
2007	Hidamari Sketch	TV series	Akiyuki Shinbo, Ryouki Kamitsubo	Shaft	
2007	5 Centimeters per Second	Film	Makoto Shinkai	CoMix Wave Films	
2007	Clannad	TV series	Tatsuya Ishihara	Kyoto Animation	
2007	Lucky Star	TV series	Yutaka Yamamoto, Yasuhiro Takemoto	Kyoto Animation	
2007	Minami-ke	TV series	Masahiko Ohta	Daume	
2007	Sketchbook ~full color's~	TV series	Yoshimasa Hiraike	Hal Film Maker	
2008	Hyakko	TV series	Michio Fukuda	Nippon Animation	
2008	Toradora!	TV series	Tatsuyuki Nagai	J.C.Staff	
2009	GA Geijutsuka Art Design Class	TV series	Hiroaki Sakurai	AIC	
2009	K-On!	TV series	Naoko Yamada	Kyoto Animation	
2009	Ristorante Paradiso	TV series	Mitsuko Kase	David Production	
2009	Student Council's Discretion	TV series	Takuya Sato	Studio Deen	
2010	And Yet the Town Moves	TV series	Akiyuki Shinbo	Shaft	
2010	Bakuman	TV series	Kenichi Kasai, Noriaki Akitaya	J.C.Staff	
2010	Mitsudomoe	TV series	Masahiko Ohta	Bridge	
2010	Sound of the Sky	TV series	Mamoru Kanbe	A-1 Pictures, Aniplex	
2010	Tamayura	OVA	Junichi Sato	Hal Film Maker	
2010	Squid Girl	TV series	Tsutomu Mizushima	Diomedéa	
2010	Working!!	TV series	Yoshimasa Hiraike	A-1 Pictures	
2011	A Channel	TV series	Manabu Ono	Studio Gokumi	
2011	Anohana: The Flower We Saw That Day	TV series	Tatsuyuki Nagai	A-1 Pictures	
2011–2020	Chihayafuru	TV series	Morio Asaka	Madhouse	
2011	From Up on Poppy Hill	Film	Gorō Miyazaki	Studio Ghibli	
2011	Hanasaku Iroha	TV series	Masahiro Ando	P.A. Works	
2011	Nichijou	TV series	Tatsuya Ishihara	Kyoto Animation	
2011	Tamayura: Hitotose	TV series	Junichi Sato	TYO Animations	
2011	YuruYuri	TV series	Masahiko Ohta	Dogakobo	
2012	Daily Lives of High School Boys	TV series	Shinji Takamatsu	Sunrise	
2012	Hidamari Sketch x Honeycomb	TV series	Akiyuki Shinbo	Shaft	
2012	Hyouka	TV series	Yasuhiro Takemoto	Kyoto Animation	
2012	Kill Me Baby	TV series	Yoshiki Yamakawa	J.C.Staff	
2012	Kimi to Boku 2	TV series	Mamoru Kanbe	J.C.Staff	
2012	Mysterious Girlfriend X	TV series	Ayumu Watanabe	Hoods Entertainment	
2012	Place to Place	TV series	Fumitoshi Oizaki	AIC	
2012–2013	Shirokuma Cafe	TV series	Mitsuyuki Masuhara	Studio Pierrot	
2012	Teekyu	TV series	Shin Itagaki	Mappa	
2012	Wolf Children	Film	Mamoru Hosoda	Studio Chizu, Madhouse	
2012	Yurumates 3D	TV series	Yoshihide Yuuzumi	C2C	
2013	Free!	TV series	Hiroko Utsumi	Kyoto Animation, Animation Do	
2013	Genshiken: Second Season	TV series	Tsutomu Mizushima	Production I.G	
2013	GJ Club	TV series	Yoshiyuki Fujiwara	Dogakobo	
2013	Kin-iro Mosaic	TV series	Tensho	Studio Gokumi	
2013	Kotoura-san	TV series	Masahiko Ohta	AIC Classic	
2013	Love Live!	TV series	Takahiko Kyogoku	Sunrise	
2013	Minami-ke: Tadaima	TV series	Keiichiro Kawaguchi	Feel	
2013	My Teen Romantic Comedy SNAFU	TV series	Ai Yoshimura	Brain's Base	
2013	Non Non Biyori	TV series	Shin'ya Kawatsura	Silver Link	
2013	Servant × Service	TV series	Yasutaka Yamamoto	A-1 Pictures	
2013–2014	Silver Spoon	TV series	Tomohiko Itō	A-1 Pictures	
2013	Super Seisyun Brothers	TV series	Masahiro Takata	AIC PLUS+	
2013	Tamako Market	TV series	Naoko Yamada	Kyoto Animation	
2013	Tamayura: More Aggressive	TV series	Junichi Sato	TYO Animations	
2013	WataMote	TV series	Shin Ōnuma	Silver Link	
2013	The Wind Rises	Film	Hayao Miyazaki	Studio Ghibli	
2013	Yuyushiki	TV series	Kaori	Kinema Citrus	
2014	Inugami-san to Nekoyama-san	TV series	Shinpei Nagai	Seven	
2014	Barakamon	TV series	Masaki Tachibana	Kinema Citrus	
2014	The Comic Artist and His Assistants	TV series	Takeshi Furuta	Zexcs	
2014	Engaged to the Unidentified	TV series	Yoshiyuki Fujiwara	Doga Kobo	
2014	Free! – Eternal Summer	TV series	Hiroko Utsumi	Kyoto Animation, Animation Do	
2014	Hanayamata	TV series	Atsuko Ishizuka	Madhouse	
2014	Is the Order a Rabbit?	TV series	Hiroyuki Hashimoto	White Fox	
2014	My Neighbor Seki	TV series	Yūji Mutoh	Shin-Ei Animation	
2014	Go! Go! 575	TV series	Takefumi Anzai	Lay-duce, C2C	
2014	Shirobako	TV series	Tsutomu Mizushima	P.A. Works	
2014	Soul Eater Not!	TV series	Masakazu Hashimoto	Bones	
2014	Tesagure! Bukatsu-mono Encore	TV series	Kōtarō Ishidate	YAOYOROZU	
2014	Wake Up, Girls!	TV series	Yutaka Yamamoto	Ordet, Tatsunoko Production	
2015	Food Wars!: Shokugeki no Soma	TV series	Yoshitomo Yonetani	J.C. Staff	
2015	Castle Town Dandelion	TV series	Noriaki Akitaya	Production IMS	
2015	Himouto! Umaru-chan	TV series	Masahiko Ohta	Doga Kobo	
2015	Kamisama Minarai: Himitsu no Cocotama	TV series	Norio Nitta	OLM, Inc.	
2015	Wakaba Girl	TV series	Masaharu Watanabe	Nexus	
2015	School-Live!	TV series	Masaomi Andō	Lerche	
2015	Sound! Euphonium	TV series	Tatsuya Ishihara	Kyoto Animation	
2016	Anne Happy	TV series	Shin Ōnuma	Silver Link	
2016	A Silent Voice	Film	Naoko Yamada	Kyoto Animation	
2016	Flying Witch	TV series	Katsushi Sakurabi	J.C.Staff	
2016	Haven't You Heard? I'm Sakamoto	TV series	Shinji Takamatsu	Studio Deen	
2016	Tanaka-kun is Always Listless	TV series	Shin'ya Kawatsura	Silver Link	
2017	A Centaur's Life	TV series	Fumitoshi Oizaki	Tokuma Shoten	
2017	Blend S	TV series	Ryōji Masuyama	A-1 Pictures	
2017	Gabriel DropOut	TV series	Masahiko Ohta	Doga Kobo	
2017	Girls' Last Tour	TV series	Takaharu Ozaki	White Fox	
2017	Kino's Journey —the Beautiful World— the Animated Series	TV series	Tomohisa Taguchi	Lerche	
2017	Restaurant to Another World	TV series	Masato Jinbo	Silver Link	
2017–2021	Miss Kobayashi's Dragon Maid	TV series	Yasuhiro Takemoto	Kyoto Animation	
2018	How to Keep a Mummy	TV series	Kaori Komori	Eight Bit	
2018	Comic Girls	TV series	Yoshinobu Tokumoto	Nexus	
2018-now	Grand Blue	TV series	Shinji Takamatsu (s.1-s.3)	Zero-G	
2018	I Want to Eat Your Pancreas	Film	Shin'ichirô Ushijima	Studio VOLN	
2018–2021	Laid-Back Camp	TV series	Yoshiaki Kyōgoku (s.1); Masato Jinbo (s.2)	C-Station	
2018–2022	Teasing Master Takagi-san	TV series	Hiroaki Akagi	Shin-Ei Animation	
2019	The Helpful Fox Senko-san	TV series	Tomoaki Koshida	Doga Kobo	
2019–2022	Kaguya-sama: Love is War	TV series	Shinichi Omata (s.1- s.3)	A-1 Pictures	
2020	Keep Your Hands Off Eizouken!	TV series	Masaaki Yuasa	Science Saru	
2020	Uzaki-chan Wants to Hang Out!	TV series	Kazuya Miura	ENGI	
2020	Wave, Listen to Me!	TV series	Tatsuma Minamikawa	Sunrise	
2020	Words Bubble Up Like Soda Pop	Film	Kyōhei Ishiguro	Sublimation, Signal.MD	
2021	Don't Toy with Me, Miss Nagatoro	TV series	Hirokazu Hanai	Telecom Animation Film	
2021	Hori-san to Miyamura-kun	TV series	Masashi Ishihama	CloverWorks	
2021	Super Cub	TV series	Toshiro Fujii	Studio Kai	
2021	Let's Make a Mug Too	TV series	Jun Kamiya	Nippon Animation	
2021	The Aquatope on White Sand	TV series	Toshiya Shinohara	P.A. Works	
2022	Akebi's Sailor Uniform	TV series	Miyuki Kuroki	CloverWorks	
2022	My Dress-Up Darling	TV series	Keisuke Shinohara	CloverWorks	
2022	Sasaki and Miyano	TV series	Shinji Ishihira	Studio Deen	
2022	Deaimon	TV series	Fumitoshi Oizaki	Encourage Films	
2022	Bocchi the Rock!	TV series	Keiichirō Saitō	CloverWorks	
2022	Slow Loop	TV series	Noriaki Akitaya	Connect	
2022	When Will Ayumu Make His Move?	TV series	Mirai Minato	Silver Link	
2023	Onimai: I'm Now Your Sister	TV series	Shingo Fujii	Studio Bind	
2023	The Ice Guy and His Cool Female Colleague	TV series	Mankyu	ZERO-G, Liber	
2023	Farming Life in Another World	TV series	Ryôichi Kuraya	ZERO-G	
2023	Ippon Again!	TV series	Ken Ogiwara	BAKKEN RECORD	
2025	Food for the Soul	TV series	Shinya Kawatsura, Yū Harumi	P.A. Works	
2025	Zatsu Tabi: That's Journey	TV series	Masaharu Watanabe	Makaria	
2025	A Ninja and an Assassin Under One Roof	TV series	Yukihiro Miyamoto	Shaft	
2025	Ruri Rocks	TV series	Shingo Fujii	Studio Bind	
2025	See You Tomorrow at the Food Court	TV series	Koga Kazuomi	Atelier Pontdarc	
2026	The Food Diary of Miss Maid	TV series	Ryousuke Senbo	EMT Squared, Magic Bus	
2026	You and I Are Polar Opposites	TV series	Takayoshi Nagatomo	Lapin Track	
