= Yuri Yuri Panic =

Japanese manga series

- Yuri Yuri Panic: A Case of Extreme Cuteness Has Occurred!
- First tankōbon volume cover

ゆりゆりぱにっく～尊すぎる事案が発生しています！～ (Yuriyuri Panikku: Tōto Sugiru Jian ga Hassei Shiteimasu!)
- Genre: Yuri
- Manga
- Written by: Kanko Nakamura
- Published by: Futabasha
- English publisher: NA: Seven Seas Entertainment
- Imprint: Action Comics
- Magazine: Web Comic Action
- Original run: September 6, 2024 – present
- Volumes: 2

Yuri Yuri Panic: A Case of Extreme Cuteness Has Occurred! (ゆりゆりぱにっく～尊すぎる事案が発生しています！～, Yuriyuri Panikku: Tōto Sugiru Jian ga Hassei Shiteimasu!), also known as Yuripani (ゆりぱに) for short, is a Japanese manga series written and illustrated by Kanko Nakamura. It began serialization on Futabasha's Web Comic Action service in September 2024, and has been compiled into two volumes as of February 2026.

== Plot ==
Akari Mochizuki, a first-year high school student, receives a love letter on the first day of school, which contained a marriage registration form. It came from Runa Kiyozumi, her classmate who had quickly become the object of admiration in class. Akari is confused as she had never interacted with Runa before and had deliberately prevented herself from standing out to avoid attention. However, despite her attempts to avoid Runa, Runa becomes closer to her and trying to get her attention.

== Characters ==
Akari Mochizuki (望月 あかり, Mochizuki Akari)
A first-year student with a loner personality, her only "friend" prior to befriending Runa being a bird plush named Omochi (おもちちゃん, Omochi-chan). When she was younger, she encountered Runa and fixed her plush bear when it was attacked; however, she has no recollection of their meeting. She currently is in the care of her aunt Natsumi as her father works abroad.
Runa Kiyozumi (清澄 るな, Kiyozumi Runa)
Akari's classmate, who confessed to her on the first day of school. She is beautiful, intelligent, and mysterious, and quickly became the most popular girl in class. She became interested in Akari after encountering her as a kid when Akari repaired her plush bear. She later starts a gambling club in order to be in a club with Akari, although it is officially branded as the Gaming Club. Her older sister Meteo is the school nurse.
Omochi (おもちちゃん, Omochi-chan)
A bird plush who serves as Akari's imaginary friend. She was Akari's only friend prior to meeting Runa. She is actually an alien named Harmonica, a member of an alien race called the Emojans, who came to Earth after her planet was destroyed, taking up Akari's plush as her body. She is a big fan of the yuri manga artist Kokoa Mantenboshi.
Meteo Kiyozumi (清澄 メテオ, Kiyozumi Meteo)
Runa's older sister and the school nurse. She wears the school's uniform due to being interested in high school girls. She is also an idol fan, once inviting Akari to an idol concert. She is actually the CEO of Petit Unifo, a skincare company.
Chidori Hanabusa (花房 千鳥, Hanabusa Chidori)
The student council vice-president of Hinamori Academy. She has short hair and has a yamato nadeshiko-like personality.
Renkaku Kokonoe (九重 蓮鶴, Kokonoe Renkaku)
The student council president of Hinamori Academy. She has short hair and wears a military-style hat. Chidori, who is her childhood friend, calls her "Tsuru-chan".
Rumi Hiroi (日路井 流美, Hiroi Rumi)
Akari and Runa's homeroom teacher and the advisor of the Gaming Club. She has a social media account but has only two followers, one of whom is actually Omochi.
Koko Amahara (天原 心, Amahara Koko)
Akari and Runa's classmate, who works with her twin sister Ai under the pen name Kokoa Mantenboshi (満天星 ここあ, Mantenboshi Kokoa). She is in charge of their works' art.
Ai Amahara (天原 愛, Amahara Ai)
Koko's twin sister and the other part of Kokoa Mantenboshi. She is in charge of writing their works' story.
Marie Bouquet (マリィ・ブーケ, Marii Būke)
A student from France who transfers to Akari and Runa's class. She quickly becomes popular because of her beauty and aura. She is actually Quartet, a fellow Emojan and Harmonica's friend, who took over the body of a sickly French girl who befriended a plush of her own named Rusty.

== Development ==
Kanko Nakamura began developing the series as she was finishing her previous manga, Uchi no Maid ga Uzasugiru!. She wanted to write a manga featuring a character with high self-esteem, contrasting that character with another one who had low self-esteem. Early concepts for the series included focusing on a boy and a girl who were twins, as well as a magical girl who boosted her self-esteem by fighting for the world. Nakamura originally intended Runa to have a male butler who liked high school uniforms, but she changed the character to be an older sister who had the same interest as she thought a male character would not fit the series being yuri. She wanted to contrast Runa with the character Tsubame Kamoi from UzaMaid!, with Runa having an eccentric personality instead of Tsubame's brashness.

== Publication ==
The series is written and illustrated by Kanko Nakamura, who had previously worked in the manga series Uchi no Maid ga Uzasugiru! in Futabasha's Monthly Action magazine. It began serialization on Futabasha's Web Comic Action service on September 6, 2024, with the series also being published on the company's Gaugau Monster web service from November 3, 2024. The first tankōbon volume was released on April 10, 2025; two volumes have been released as of February 12, 2026. The series is licensed in English by Seven Seas Entertainment, who will release the first English volume on September 22, 2026.

No.	Original release date	Original ISBN	North American release date	North American ISBN
1	April 10, 2025	978-4-575-86073-3	September 22, 2026	979-8-89863-102-4
2	February 12, 2026	978-4-575-86188-4	—	—

== See also ==
- Uchi no Maid ga Uzasugiru!, another manga series by the same author
