= UzaMaid =

Japanese manga series

- UzaMaid: Our Maid is Way Too Annoying!
- The cover of the first volume.

うちのメイドがウザすぎる! (Uchi no Maid ga Uzasugiru!)
- Genre: Comedy
- Manga
- Written by: Kanko Nakamura
- Published by: Futabasha
- English publisher: NA: Kaiten Books
- Imprint: Action Comics
- Magazine: Monthly Action
- Original run: August 25, 2016 – January 25, 2023
- Volumes: 10
- Anime television series
- Directed by: Masahiko Ohta
- Produced by: Noritomo Isogai; Mieko Tsuruta; Shinpei Yamashita; Taisuke Hashirayama; Toyokazu Nakahigashi; Soujirou Arimizu
- Written by: Takashi Aoshima
- Music by: Yasuhiro Misawa
- Studio: Doga Kobo
- Licensed by: NA: Crunchyroll; SA/SEA: Medialink
- Original network: AT-X, Tokyo MX, KBS, BS11, SUN, TVA, TVQ
- Original run: October 5, 2018 – December 21, 2018
- Episodes: 12 + OVA

UzaMaid: Our Maid Is Way Too Annoying! (Japanese: うちのメイドがウザすぎる!, Hepburn: Uchi no Maid ga Uzasugiru!), known as UzaMaid! (ウザメイド!, UzaMeido!) for short, is a Japanese manga series written and illustrated by Kanko Nakamura. An anime television series adaptation by Doga Kobo aired between October and December 2018.

== Plot ==
Tsubame Kamoi, a former JSDF pilot who is attracted to young girls, takes on a job as a maid to look after Misha Takanashi, a Russian 8-year-old girl who recently lost her mother. The series follows Misha constantly having to deal with Tsubame's dubious behavior while occasionally seeing some of the good in her.

== Characters ==
Misha Takanashi (高梨 ミーシャ, Takanashi Mīsha)
Voiced by: Haruka Shiraishi
A Russian girl who has become a rebellious recluse following her mother's death. She is fearful of Tsubame's behavior and often tries to find ways to get rid of her. Her mother had named her after Koguma no Mīsha, an anime series about the 1980 Olympic mascot Misha.
Tsubame Kamoi (鴨居 つばめ, Kamoi Tsubame)
Voiced by: Manami Numakura
An eye-patched ex–Air Self-Defense Force soldier who becomes the Takanashi family's maid. She has a fascination with little girls and thus becomes very attached to Misha.
Mimika Washizaki (鷲崎 みみか, Washizaki Mimika)
Voiced by: Sayaka Harada
Misha's classmate, who she nicknames "Washiwashi".
Yui Morikawa (森川 ゆい, Morikawa Yui)
Voiced by: Shiori Izawa
Misha's classmate who has a one-sided rivalry with her.
Midori Ukai (鵜飼 みどり, Ukai Midori)
Voiced by: M.A.O
Another ex-JASDF soldier with a strong fascination for her fellow comrade Tsubame and lefted the air force for her sadomasochistic behaviour.
Yasuhiro Takanashi (高梨 ヤスヒロ, Takanashi Yasuhiro)
Voiced by: Masayuki Katou
Misha's stepfather, who becomes over delighted when Misha shows him any kind of interest.
Kumagorō (クマゴロー)
Misha's pet ferret.

== Media ==
=== Manga ===
Kanko Nakamura launched the manga in Futabasha's seinen manga magazine Monthly Action on August 25, 2016. The first two chapters were originally published in Shinshokan's Hirari yuri publication under the name Tsubakuma! (つばくま!) between November 30, 2013, and March 29, 2014. The manga ended serialization on January 25, 2023. The manga is licensed in North America by Kaiten Books.

No.	Original release date	Original ISBN	English release date	English ISBN
1	January 12, 2017	978-4-575-84913-4	August 7, 2020	978-1-952241-06-2
2	October 12, 2017	978-4-575-85043-7	—	—
3	April 12, 2018	978-4-575-85135-9	—	—
4	November 12, 2018	978-4-575-85229-5	—	—
5	August 8, 2019	978-4-575-85337-7	—	—
6	March 12, 2020	978-4-575-85421-3	—	—
7	November 12, 2020	978-4-575-85512-8	—	—
8	August 11, 2021	978-4-575-85621-7	—	—
9	May 12, 2022	978-4-575-85715-3	—	—
10	March 9, 2023	978-4-575-85822-8	—	—

=== Anime ===
An anime television series adaptation was announced on April 11, 2018. The series aired in Japan between October 5 and December 21, 2018, on AT-X, Tokyo MX, KBS, BS11, Sun TV, TV Aichi, and TVQ Broadcasting Kyushu, and was simulcast by Crunchyroll. Medialink holds the license to the series in Southeast Asia and South Asia. The series is directed by Masahiko Ohta and written by Takashi Aoshima, with animation by studio Doga Kobo. Character designs for the series are provided by Jun Yamazaki. The opening and ending themes respectively are "Uzauza☆Waosu!" (ウザウザ☆わおーっす！, Annoying Wow!) and "Tokimeki Climax" (ときめき☆くらいまっくす), both performed by Haruka Shiraishi and Manami Numakura. An original video animation was bundled with the series' fourth Blu-ray/DVD volume, released on April 24, 2019.

No.	Title (Note: All English titles are taken from Crunchyroll.)	Original release date
1	"Our Maid Is Too Annoying!" "Uchi no Meido ga Uzasugiru!" (うちのメイドがウザすぎる！)	October 5, 2018
Tsubame Kamoi, an ex-JASDF officer who had become fascinated with a Russian girl named Misha Takanashi, applies to be a maid at Misha's house. This does not settle well with Misha, who has become aggressive since her mother died and is intimidated by Tsubame's perverted behavior. On Tsubame's first day on the job, Misha tries various methods to get rid of her, only to fail at every turn.
2	"My Maid Kidnapped Me" "Uchi no Meido ni Sawarawareta" (うちのメイドにさわらわれた)	October 12, 2018
Wanting to become friends with Misha, Tsubame tries befriending her over a cooperative online game, but her identity is soon blown. Later, Tsubame forces Misha to join her on a camping trip in the mountains, where she briefly mentions how her father died when she was Misha's age.
3	"My Maid is Sneaking Up On Me" "Uchi no Meida ga Shinobiyoru" (うちのメイドが忍び寄る)	October 19, 2018
Tsubame learns that Misha has not been going to school since her mother's death, since she does not like the attention she gets from her appearance. After a talk about how judging by appearances is only temporary, Tsubame manages to convince Misha to go to school the next day, if for no other reason than to get away from her. On her first day back, Misha discovers that, due to their homeroom teacher's carelessness over the summer break, the class's hamster has given birth to several babies. Fearing for the hamsters' safety, Misha works with her classmates to properly deal with them and find homes for the babies, managing to get over her original fears.
4	"My Maid Reveres Young Girls" "Uchi no Meido wa Yōjo ga Tōtoi" (うちのメイドは幼女が尊い)	October 26, 2018
Misha forgets about her weekend homework on future careers until the last minute, but manages to finish it after hearing from Tsubame about her side job. Later, Misha invites over her classmate Mimika Washizaki, who becomes less worried about her plain appearance thanks to her and Tsubame.
5	"My Maid Is Everywhere" "Uchi no Meido wa Doko ni Demo iru" (うちのメイドはどこにでもいる)	November 2, 2018
Misha's classmate Yui Morikawa challenges her to a contest to see who can makes themselves look the cutest, receiving some unexpected fashion advice from Tsubame in the process. When Yui sprains her ankle during the school sports festival, Tsubame takes her place on Misha's team.
6	"Our Maid's Girl From The Past?" "Uchi no Meido no Mukashi no Onna?" (うちのメイドの昔のオンナ？)	November 9, 2018
Misha encounters Midori Ukai, a former JASDF lieutenant who fell in love with Tsubame and developed a masochistic obsession with her. Feeling that she could get Tsubame out of her house, Misha decides to hire Midori as her maid and fire Tsubame.
7	"My Maid Doesn't Come Anymore" "Uchi no Maid ga Inai Ie" (うちのメイドがいない家)	November 16, 2018
Misha starts to regret firing Tsubame as Midori proves to be a less than satisfactory cook. Misha hires Tsubame back, but still has to put up with Midori during her month's notice.
8	"My Former Maid is From a Good Family" "Uchi no Moto Meido wa Ojōsama" (うちの元メイドはお嬢様)	November 23, 2018
Learning that Midori's family owns a high-end hotel, Misha and Tsubame decide to spend the night in her suite. As Midori's time working as Misha's maid draws to an end, she ends up moving in next door to start her own house cleaning business. Later, Tsubame launches an investigation when Misha's underwear goes missing, followed by her own.
9	"My Maid and the Day We Met" "Uchi no Meido to Ano Hi no Deai" (うちのメイドとあの日の出会い)	November 30, 2018
When her pet ferret Kumaguro goes missing, Misha gets help from Midori's pet dog and manages to track him down to Yui's house, finding that her little sister Yuina had picked him up. On a snowy day, Yui challenges Misha and Mimika to a snowball fight, with Tsubame providing some tactical advice.
10	"My Maid and Yasuhiro" "Uchi no Meido to Yasuhiro to" (うちのメイドとヤスヒロと)	December 7, 2018
Misha and her stepfather Yasuhiro go to a capybara hot spring inn, only to find Tsubame had followed them there and is working part-time. After spotting an alleged panda by the petting area, Misha ignores Yasuhiro's warnings and sneaks off by herself into the mountains to find some evidence, soon finding herself lost. Shocked to find Misha missing, Yasuhiro asks Tsubame to search for her. Misha follows the panda she spotted, which turns out to be the child of an angry mother grizzly bear, but Tsubame arrives on time to rescue her.
11	"My Maid And The Forbidden Room" "Uchi no Meido to Akazu no Heya" (うちのメイドと開かずの部屋)	December 14, 2018
Misha invites Mimika over for a sleepover while Yasuhiro is away, with Yui deciding to tag along, remaining insistent that her mother's studio remain untouched. That night, Yui and Mimika get scared while visiting the bathroom and inadvertently flee into the studio, leaving footprints everywhere. The next morning, as Misha becomes furious upon discovering that the studio had been disturbed, Tsubame, not wanting Misha to lash out at her friends, takes the blame for the incident, leading Misha to direct her anger towards her instead and lock herself in the studio.
12	"My Maid Now and Forever" "Uchi no Meido to Korekara mo" (うちのメイドとこれからも)	December 21, 2018
As Misha remains shut up inside her mother's room, Yasuhiro explains how the studio is important to Misha as she allegedly believes her mother may still return. Recalling her own father's death, Tsubame tells Misha that her mother is not there, leading her to calm down and apologize to her friends (she alone discovered their footprints, discerning they were responsible and that Tsubume was innocent all along). After speaking with Misha, Midori confronts Tsubame as she attempts to leave, reminding her of how much she cares for Misha. Tsubame tells Misha about how her father's death led to her joining the JASDF under the belief that he was waiting in the sky. Misha then explains that she was angry of herself for seemingly forgetting about her mother, to which Tsubame assures Misha that she is making better progress than herself, who clung onto the JASDF until she was forced to quit due to losing sight in her right eye. Warmed by Tsubame's words, Misha invites her into the room to help her clean it.
OVA	"My Maid Is Still Seriously Way Too Annoying..." "Uchi no Meido wa Yappari Mō Honto Uzainda naa……" (うちのメイドはやっぱりもうホントウザいんだなあ……)	April 24, 2019
Misha and her friends go to a hot spring theme park together, with Tsubame and Midori joining in tow. When Misha ends up forgetting to bring underwear, Tsubame vows to protect her decency on the way home. Later, Misha attempts to prove she can carry out the work of a maid, finding that it is not as easy as she imagined.

== See also ==
- Yuri Yuri Panic, another manga series by the same author
