= Himouto! Umaru-chan =

Japanese manga series

- First tankōbon volume cover, featuring Umaru Doma

干物妹!うまるちゃん (Himōto! Umaru-chan)
- Genre: Comedy; Slice of life
- Manga
- Written by: Sankakuhead
- Published by: Shueisha
- English publisher: NA: Seven Seas Entertainment
- Imprint: Young Jump Comics
- Magazine: Weekly Young Jump
- Original run: March 14, 2013 – November 9, 2017
- Volumes: 12
Further information
Manga
Himouto! Umaru-chan S
Written by	Sankakuhead
Published by	Shueisha
Magazine	Niconico Seiga; Tonari no Young Jump
Original run	March 20, 2014 – July 27, 2015
Volumes	1
Anime television series
Directed by	Masahiko Ohta
Written by	Takashi Aoshima
Music by	Yasuhiro Misawa
Studio	Doga Kobo
Licensed by	AUS: Madman Entertainment; NA: Sentai Filmworks; SEA: Medialink; UK: Animatsu Entertainment
Original network	ABC, Tokyo MX, BS11, AT-X
Original run	July 9, 2015 – September 24, 2015
Episodes	12
Video game
Himōto! Umaru-chan: Himōto! Ikusei Keikaku
Developer	Connect Wizard
Publisher	FuRyu
Genre	Life simulation game
Platform	PlayStation Vita
Released	December 3, 2015
Manga
Akita Imokko! Ebina-chan
Written by	Sankakuhead
Published by	Shueisha
Imprint	Young Jump Comics
Magazine	Tonari no Young Jump; Niconico Seiga
Original run	December 7, 2015 – September 19, 2017
Volumes	2
Original video animation
Directed by	Masahiko Ohta
Written by	Takashi Aoshima
Music by	Yasuhiro Misawa
Studio	Doga Kobo
Released	October 19, 2015 – April 24, 2017
Episodes	2
Anime television series
Himouto! Umaru-chan R
Directed by	Masahiko Ohta
Written by	Takashi Aoshima
Music by	Yasuhiro Misawa
Studio	Doga Kobo
Licensed by	AUS: Madman Entertainment; NA: Sentai Filmworks; SEA: Medialink; UK: MVM Films
Original network	ABC, Tokyo MX, BS11, AT-X
Original run	October 8, 2017 – December 24, 2017
Episodes	12
Manga
Himouto! Umaru-chan G
Written by	Sankakuhead
Published by	Shueisha
English publisher	NA: Seven Seas Entertainment
Magazine	Weekly Young Jump
Original run	November 30, 2017 – April 19, 2018
Volumes	1
- icon

Himouto! Umaru-chan (Japanese: 干物妹!うまるちゃん, Hepburn: Himōto! Umaru-chan (Note: The "himōto" in the title is a portmanteau of himono onna (干物女, lit. 'Dried Fish Woman'; used to describe someone who puts up an appearance in public but acts lazily at home) and imōto (妹, "little sister").)) is a Japanese manga series written and illustrated by Sankakuhead. After two one-shot chapters published in Shueisha's seinen manga magazine Miracle Jump in 2012, the manga was serialized in Weekly Young Jump from March 2013 to November 2017, with its chapters collected in 12 tankōbon volumes. A sequel manga titled, Himouto! Umaru-chan G, was published in the same magazine from November 2017 to April 2018, with its chapters collected in a single volume. An anime television series adaptation aired from July to September 2015. A second season titled Himouto! Umaru-chan R aired from October to December 2017.

== Premise ==
Umaru Doma is a high school girl living with her older brother Taihei. At school, Umaru appears to be the ideal student with good looks, top grades and many talents. However, she transforms into a kid-sized layabout, and spends time at home having a food and video game addiction, much to Taihei's dismay. Throughout the series, Umaru uses her alternative personality to make friends with others.

== Characters ==
Umaru Doma (土間 埋, Doma Umaru)
Voiced by: Aimi Tanaka (Japanese); Emily Neves (English)
A 16-year-old high school girl with beautiful looks, top grades and excellence in everything. She has a secret lifestyle at home,^{Ch. 2} wearing a hamster hoodie^{Ch. 4} and being into otaku culture. While indoors, she is drawn in a chibi manner,^{Ch. 1} later calling herself Komaru (Umaru's sister) when Kirie catches her in the persona.^{Ch. 19} She lives with her brother Taihei. She wears a cap while at the amusement arcade, where she is a well-known gamer who goes by the initials UMR.^{Ch. 12} She wears a mask to hide her identity from Sylphynford.^{Ch. 51, 56}
Taihei Doma (土間 大平, Doma Taihei)
Voiced by: Kenji Nojima (Japanese); Adam Noble (English)
Umaru's older brother working at the company.^{Ch. 14, Vol. 3 extra} He lives in a 1DK apartment.^{Ch. 77}^{Ep. 2} The siblings move in a year before the series.^{Ch. 1} He is described as having a kind and methodical personality. He reprimands Umaru for being lazy.
Nana Ebina (海老名 菜々, Ebina Nana)
Voiced by: Akari Kageyama (Japanese); Sara Ornelas (English)
Umaru's buxom classmate living in the ground-floor apartment near the siblings. She is often referred to by her surname. She is very shy,^{Ch. 2, 8} and is originally from Akita Prefecture, occasionally reverting to dialect when she eating. Because of her breasts, she has a lack of confidence as people look at her. The first person to look her in the eyes is Taihei, whom she later has a crush on^{Vol. 2 extra} and gets flustered whenever he gives her compliments.^{Ch. 32} She has an older brother named Koichiro who ran away to Tokyo and worked at a restaurant that later moved to Hamamatsu. Taihei suspects he might have met him on his business trip.^{Ch. 98} She appears in the spin-off manga "Akita Imokko! Ebina-chan" (秋田妹！えびなちゃん, lit. Akita Native Little Sister Ebina), after having placed first in a Niconico Seiga poll among other characters.
Kirie Motoba (本場 切絵, Motoba Kirie)
Voiced by: Haruka Shiraishi (Japanese); Jad Saxton (English)
A classmate and a petite girl with frightening eyes to scare others.^{Ch. 18} She is shy and has a great admiration for Umaru. She becomes friends with Komaru, thinking she is Umaru's sister. She is a servant calling her Master.^{Ch. 18–20} She considers Nana a rival for Umaru's affection at first,^{Ch. 25}^{Ep. 3} but later gets along with her. She is a member of the swim club,^{Ep. 1, 3} and is good at other sports like tennis.^{Ep. 4} She aspires to be a picture book author.^{Ch. 93}^{Ep. 18}
Sylphynford Tachibana (橘・シルフィンフォード, Tachibana Shirufinfōdo)
Voiced by: Yurina Furukawa (Japanese); Christina Kelly (English)
One of Umaru's classmates. She is very openly competitive, and considers Umaru a rival in academics and sports.^{Ch. 2, 16} She becomes friends with one of Umaru's personas, UMR, with hopes of beating her at school,^{Ch. 56, 65} and later gets along with her friends.^{Ch. 82-84} She is half-Japanese and German.^{Ch. 77}
Takeshi Motoba (本場 猛, Motoba Takeshi)
Voiced by: Hiroki Yasumoto (Japanese); Jason Douglas (English)
Kirie's brother with an afro.^{Ch. 34} His nickname is Bomber (ぼんば, Bonba).^{Ch. 14} He likes to slack off at work.^{Vol. 1 extra, 22, Vol. 3 extra} He and Taihei became friends since high school, but he was not as studious.^{Ch. 57} He gets jealous when sees Taihei hanging out with the girls, but when he meets Komaru, he feels she is cute too. He tries to interact with Kirie, but she gets annoyed from him.^{Ch. 34} When he meets Umaru in her outdoor persona and Nana, he becomes very nervous and shy. He thinks Komaru and Umaru are two different people, and cannot recognize his sister during the trip.^{Ch. 66-67}
Alex Tachibana (橘・アレックス, Tachibana Arekkusu)
Voiced by: Tetsuya Kakihara (Japanese); Scott Gibbs (English)
Sylphynford's brother. He works in Taihei's department.^{Ch. 14} He is part German and has relatives from Europe.^{Ch. 15} He enjoys playing video games.^{Ch. 51, 52} He knows of Umaru's dual personality.^{Ch. 71} He later reveals that when he was in middle school, he was a shut-in. He later moves to Japan to attend high school and work with Kanau.^{Ch. 111}
Manager Kanau (叶課長, Kanau kachō)
Voiced by: Ami Koshimizu (Japanese); Maggie Flecknoe (English)
Kanau Kongou (金剛 叶, Kongō Kanau) is the boss of Taihei, Bomber, and Alex, described in Young Jump magazine as beautiful and excellent. She met Taihei and Bomber at high school ten years ago.^{Vol. 1 extra, 96} She is very fond of Taihei,^{Ep. 5} but gets annoyed by Bomber. Kanau is a single person and living on her own.^{Vol. 3 extra} Umaru becomes upset of her at first. Taihei reveals that she is the daughter of the president, a year younger than Taihei, and that they attended different classes.^{Ch. 96,} ^{Ep. 17} She has a younger sister Hikari.^{Ch. 125}
Hikari Kongō (金剛 ヒカリ, Kongō Hikari)
Voiced by: Inori Minase (Japanese); Kira Vincent-Davis (English)
A top student from the Gifted Youth Program with a hairpin (Note: Kongou translates to "diamond" with the name and logo of the company.^{Ch. 125}) and Kanau's sister.^{Ch. 125} It is hinted that she interacted with Taihei, before knowing the set of constellations that he tried to show Umaru.^{Ch. 107-108} She refers to Taihei as a big brother.^{Ch. 125}
Kōichirō Ebina (海老名 公一郎, Ebina Kōichirō)
Voiced by: Nobuhiko Okamoto (Japanese); Bryson Baugus (English)
Nana's older brother and restaurant chef. He left home since ten years before the series,^{Ep. 17} when Nana was seven.^{Ch. 98} His hat covers half of his face. He wears the same hair accessory as his sister while cooking.

== Production ==
On December 20, 2025, Sankakuhead released a video in which he stated that the manga was inspired by his younger sister, as well as other aspects of his life, such as his hamsters. His sister served as the model for Umaru, who fell ill between the publication of the sixth and seventh volumes (both released in 2015). She died sometime between the publication of the tenth and eleventh volumes (both released in 2017). The author noted that working on the manga and attending the wrap-up celebrations for the first season of the anime, which occurred days after her death, was particularly difficult. However, he later continued work on the eleventh and twelfth volumes in her memory.

== Media ==
=== Manga ===
Written and illustrated by Sankakuhead, two-one-shot chapters of Himouto! Umaru-chan were first published in Shueisha's seinen manga magazine Miracle Jump on August 16 and October 16, 2012. It was later serialized in Weekly Young Jump from March 14, 2013, to November 9, 2017. Shueisha collected its chapters in twelve tankōbon volumes, released from September 19, 2013, to December 19, 2017. Following the series' ending, it was announced that series would continue with a sequel, titled Himōto! Umaru-chan G, which ran in Weekly Young Jump from November 30, 2017, to April 19, 2018. A single tankōbon volume was released on July 19, 2018.

In North America, the manga was licensed for an English release by Seven Seas Entertainment. The 12 volumes of Himouto! Umaru-chan and the volume of Himouto! Umaru-chan G were released from May 22, 2018, to March 30, 2021.

A spin-off manga series, Himouto! Umaru-chan S, was published on Niconico Seiga and Tonari no Young Jump, from March 20, 2014, to July 27, 2015. Shueisha released a single tankōbon volume on August 19, 2015. Another spin-off manga series, Akita Imokko! Ebina-chan (秋田妹！えびなちゃん; lit. 'Akita Native Little Sister Ebina'), focuses on Nana Ebina, after the character ranked first on a Niconico Seiga's popularity poll, was published on Tonari no Young Jump and Niconico Seiga's Tonari no Yanjan! from December 7, 2015, to September 19, 2017. Two tankōbon volumes were released on November 18, 2016, and December 19, 2017.

A one-shot by Sankakuhead, titled Himouto! Umaru-chan 100 (干物妹! うまるちゃん100), was released on Shueisha's Young Jump+ digital manga platform on October 1, 2026.

==== Volume ====
No.	Original release date	Original ISBN	English release date	English ISBN
1	September 19, 2013	978-4-08-879706-9	May 22, 2018	978-1-626928-81-7
2	December 19, 2013	978-4-08-879722-9	July 17, 2018	978-1-626928-84-8
3	June 19, 2014	978-4-08-879861-5	October 9, 2018	978-1-626929-32-6
4	December 19, 2014	978-4-08-890083-4	January 8, 2019	978-1-626929-80-7
5	March 19, 2015	978-4-08-890175-6	April 16, 2019	978-1-642750-28-7
6	June 19, 2015	978-4-08-890207-4	July 9, 2019	978-1-642751-07-9
7	October 19, 2015	978-4-08-890268-5	October 15, 2019	978-1-642757-18-7
8	March 18, 2016	978-4-08-890370-5	January 14, 2020	978-1-64505-186-2
9	November 18, 2016	978-4-08-890479-5	April 14, 2020	978-1-64505-235-7
10	April 19, 2017	978-4-08-890630-0	July 21, 2020	978-1-64505-499-3
11	September 19, 2017	978-4-08-890740-6	October 20, 2020	978-1-64505-757-4
12	December 19, 2017	978-4-08-890821-2	January 5, 2021	978-1-64505-830-4
G1	July 19, 2018	978-4-08-891043-7	March 30, 2021	978-1-64827-099-4

=== Anime ===
An anime television series adaptation is produced by Doga Kobo. It was directed by Masahiko Ohta, written by Takashi Aoshima, with the character designed by Aya Takano, and Yasunori Ebina served as the sound director. It aired on Asahi Broadcasting Corporation from July 9 to September 24, 2015. The opening theme is "Kakushin-teki Metamarufōze!" (かくしん的☆めたまるふぉ〜ぜっ！, lit. Core Basis: Metamorphosis!) performed by Aimi Tanaka, and the ending theme is "Hidamari Days" (ひだまりデイズ, Sunshine Days) performed by Tanaka, Akari Kageyama, Haruka Shiraishi, and Yurina Furukawa. An original video animation was bundled with the manga's seventh volume on October 19, 2015, with another to be bundled with the tenth volume of the manga in Q2 2017. In the Weekly Young Jump magazine's 20th issue of 2017, a second season of the anime series, Himouto! Umaru-chan R, was announced for fall 2017 with the same cast. The opening theme is "Nimensei Ura Omote Life!" (にめんせい☆ウラオモテライフ！) performed by Tanaka, and the ending theme is "Umarun Taisou" (うまるん体操), performed by Tanaka, Kageyama, Shiraishi, and Furukawa.

The series was simulcast worldwide by Crunchyroll. It was licensed by Sentai Filmworks in North America. The second season was simulcast on Anime Strike and Hidive. It later streamed on AnimeLab in Australia and New Zealand. On September 27, 2017, Sentai Filmworks has announced that they have licensed Himouto! Umaru-chan R. After Sony acquired Crunchyroll, the series was removed from the streaming service on March 31, 2022. In the United Kingdom, MVM Entertainment licensed Himouto! Umaru-chan R. In the Philippines, the series aired in Tagalog on the Hero and Yey! pay television channels.

=== Video game ===
A PlayStation Vita sister-raising simulation game developed by FuRyu, titled Himōto! Umaru-chan: Himōto! Ikusei Keikaku (干物妹！うまるちゃん ～干物妹！育成計画～; lit. 'Himōto! Umaru-chan: Himōto! Training Plan'), was released on December 3, 2015.

== Reception ==
The manga had over 2.2 million copies in circulation by November 2015. It had over 2.7 million copies in circulation by March 2017.

The series ranked 16th in the first Next Manga Award in the print manga category.

== Works cited ==
- "Ch." is shortened form for chapter and refers to a chapter number of the Himouto! Umaru-chan manga by Sankakuhead.
- "Ep." is shortened form for episode and refers to an episode number of the Himouto! Umaru-chan anime.
