= Gabriel DropOut =

Japanese manga and anime series

- The cover of the first volume, featuring Gabriel.

ガヴリールドロップアウト (Gavurīru Doroppuauto)
- Genre: Comedy, slice of life, supernatural
- Manga
- Written by: Ukami
- Published by: ASCII Media Works
- English publisher: NA: Yen Press
- Magazine: Dengeki Daioh G
- Original run: December 27, 2013 – August 27, 2026
- Volumes: 16
- Anime television series
- Directed by: Masahiko Ohta
- Produced by: Shinpei Yamashita; Kazuya Chiba; Noritomo Isogai; Toyokazu Chūtō; Keisuke Arai; Mitsuhiro Ogata
- Written by: Takashi Aoshima
- Music by: Yasuhiro Misawa
- Studio: Doga Kobo
- Licensed by: Crunchyroll (streaming)
- Original network: AT-X, Tokyo MX, Sun TV, BS11, KBS, GBS, MTV, SBS
- English network: SEA: Animax Asia
- Original run: January 9, 2017 – March 27, 2017
- Episodes: 12 + 2 OVA
- Manga

Tapris SugarStep
- Written by: Ukami
- Illustrated by: Bafako
- Published by: ASCII Media Works
- Magazine: Dengeki Daioh G
- Original run: August 27, 2018 – October 27, 2020
- Volumes: 3
- icon

Gabriel DropOut (Japanese: ガヴリールドロップアウト, Hepburn: Gavurīru Doroppuauto) is a Japanese manga series written and illustrated by Ukami. The series was serialized in ASCII Media Works' Dengeki Daioh G magazine from December 2013 to August 2026 and is licensed in English by Yen Press. An anime television adaptation by Doga Kobo aired in Japan between January and March 2017. The anime adaptation has received generally positive reviews from critics and audiences.

== Plot ==
Upon passing a school in heaven, graduating angels are sent down to Earth, where they must learn about humans and guide them towards the correct path in order to become true angels. However, Gabriel White Tenma, the top angel in her class, becomes addicted to video games upon arriving on Earth and turns into a complete slacker as a result. The story follows Gabriel, along with other angels and demons on Earth, as she attends high school.

== Characters ==
Gabriel White Tenma (天真・ガヴリール・ホワイト, Tenma Gavurīru Howaito) / Gab (ガヴ, Gavu)
Voiced by: Miyu Tomita
The main protagonist of the series, an angel who was at the top of her class but turned into a slob after becoming addicted to video games in her attempts to help others everywhere. She is often lazy and ignores or lashes out against anyone trying to order or annoy her. Later chapters show she is still kind at heart beneath her lazy and gruff demeanor. She is Vignette's best friend. She sometimes calls herself a fallen angel ("faillen angel" in the official manga translation).
Vignette April Tsukinose (月乃瀬・ヴィネット・エイプリル, Tsukinose Vinetto Eipuriru) / Vigne (ヴィーネ, Vīne)
Voiced by: Saori Ōnishi
Gabriel's best friend, and her first friend on Earth. The complete opposite of Gabriel, she is very responsible and often looks after her, contrary to her actual role as a demon. The only exception where Vignette acts demonic or threatening is to do things she enjoys, like celebrating Christmas (despite being a demon) or forcing Gabriel into a werecat onesie. She also sometimes acts in a threatening manner to correct Gabriel's behaviour. She is usually supportive of Satania, but doesn't approve of her schemes.
Satanichia McDowell Kurumizawa (胡桃沢・サタニキア・マクドウェル, Kurumizawa Satanikia Makudoweru) / Satania (サターニャ, Satānya)
Voiced by: Naomi Ōzora
An egotistical, childish, and bratty demon who often thinks of weird or immature ways to cause mischief, which usually end in failure. She is often pestered by Raphiel and a specific stray dog, the latter of which has stolen her beloved melon bread a few times. She is frequently made fun of and not taken seriously by Raphiel (and Gabriel to a lesser extent), with Vigne often being her most supportive friend in things like studies. She can be easily tricked due to her incompetence and, as noted in the manga, being a "total dunce". Her pranks are implied to be motivated by loneliness rather than malice. Her parents own a bakery in hell. Her abbreviated name, Satania, is romanized as Satanya in the manga's English translation.
Raphiel Ainsworth Shiraha (白羽・ラフィエル・エインズワース, Shiraha Rafieru Einzuwāsu) / Raphi (ラフィ, Rafi)
Voiced by: Kana Hanazawa
The second ranked angel in Gabriel's class, who (despite normally wearing an angelic smile) has since become a gadfly who takes delight in teasing and playing pranks, mainly on Satanichia. Despite this, she considers Satanichia one of her friends. Later manga chapters have Raphiel abandon her cruel traits at the beginning of the series, though she still teases her friends. She is afraid of frogs.
Tapris Sugarbell Chisaki (千咲・タプリス・シュガーベル, Chisaki Tapurisu Shugāberu) / Tap (タプ, Tapu)
Voiced by: Inori Minase
An underclassman angel who admired Gabriel as her senior in angel school and (wrongly) presumes Satanichia was responsible for turning her into a slob because of Satanichia's false claims. She soon meets Vignette and is shocked to find out that Vignette is a demon, but soon comes to see her as a trustworthy friend. She is naive, kind and innocent, and is often bewildered by new things.
Tapris is described as beautiful, attracting the attention of several boys. However, her innocence prevents her from recognizing their romantic interest.
Machiko (まち子)
Voiced by: Mai Fuchigami
The class president of Gabriel's class, who is unaware that Gabriel and her friends aren't human, and often finds the four's actions bewildering. She gets upset when people do not listen to her.
Dog (犬)
Voiced by: Mikako Izawa
A white stray dog who often appears out of nowhere to steal Satanichia's melon bread. Satanichia later takes him in as a pet.
Master (マスター, Masutā)
Voiced by: Hideyuki Umezu
The owner of a coffee shop where Gabriel works part time to gain extra income for her expenses. He is often bewildered by Gabriel's behavior, but assumes it is because she is a foreigner. In the anime, he is also Satanichia's landlord.
Zelel White Tenma (天真・ゼルエル・ホワイト, Tenma Zerueru Howaito)
Voiced by: Miyuki Sawashiro
Gabriel's older sister, a powerful angel who is able to see through Gabriel's attempts at disguising her lazy lifestyle. She is afraid of dogs.

== Media ==
=== Manga ===
Ukami began serializing the manga series in ASCII Media Works's shōnen manga magazine Dengeki Daioh G on December 27, 2013, where it was published every other month. Starting on April 28, 2014, the series switched to monthly publication. It has been published in sixteen compiled volumes as of September 27, 2025. The series has been licensed in English by Yen Press.

A spin-off series titled Tapris SugarStep (タプリスシュガーステップ), which focuses on the character Tapris, began serialization in ASCII Media Works's Comic Dengeki Daioh G magazine in 2018. It is illustrated by Bafako and has been compiled into three volumes as of December 26, 2020.

==== Volume list ====
No.	Original release date	Original ISBN	English release date	English ISBN
1	December 20, 2014	978-4-04-869061-4	October 31, 2017	978-0-316-56128-0
2	November 27, 2015	978-4-04-865491-3	January 30, 2018	978-0-316-56130-3
3	May 27, 2016	978-4-04-865927-7	April 24, 2018	978-0-316-56132-7
4	January 10, 2017	978-4-04-892565-5	July 24, 2018	978-1-9753-2656-2
5	September 27, 2017	978-4-04-893373-5	October 30, 2018	978-1-9753-8243-8
6	May 25, 2018	978-4-04-893843-3	February 19, 2019	978-1-9753-8259-9
7	December 22, 2018	978-4-04-912235-0	July 16, 2019	978-1-9753-5820-4
8	August 26, 2019	978-4-04-912702-7	April 21, 2020	978-1-9753-0847-6
9	February 25, 2020	978-4-04-913035-5	December 22, 2020	978-1-9753-1673-0
10	November 27, 2020	978-4-04-913513-8	October 26, 2021	978-1-9753-3605-9
11	September 27, 2021	978-4-04-913976-1	July 12, 2022 (Digital); July 19, 2022 (Physical)	978-1-9753-4370-5
12	May 27, 2022	978-4-04-914425-3	May 23, 2023	978-1-9753-6401-4
13	December 27, 2022	978-4-04-914767-4	December 12, 2023	978-1-9753-7665-9
14	September 27, 2023	978-4-04-915268-5	September 17, 2024	979-8-8554-0171-4
15	September 27, 2024	978-4-04-915991-2	December 16, 2025	979-8-8554-2025-8
16	September 27, 2025	978-4-04-916699-6	December 15, 2026	979-8-8554-3837-6
17	December 24, 2026	978-4-04-952629-5	—	—

==== Tapris SugarStep ====
No.	Release date	ISBN
1	August 26, 2019	978-4-04-912701-0
2	February 25, 2020	978-4-04-913034-8
3	December 26, 2020	978-4-04-913565-7

=== Anime ===
An anime television adaptation of the series was announced in the Dengeki Daioh magazine's September 2016 issue on July 27, 2016. The anime is produced by Doga Kobo and directed by Masahiko Ohta, with Takashi Aoshima handling series composition and Katsuhiro Kumagai designing the characters. The series aired in Japan between January 9, 2017, and March 27, 2017, and was simulcast by Crunchyroll. The first episode had an advance screening on December 18, 2016, at the Shinjuku Piccadilly theatre in Tokyo. The opening and ending themes respectively are "Gabriel Dropkick" (ガヴリールドロップキック, Gavurīru Doroppukikku) and "Hallelujah Essaim" (ハレルヤ☆エッサイム, Hareruya Essaimu), both performed by Miyu Tomita, Saori Ōnishi, Naomi Ōzora, and Kana Hanazawa. The ending theme for episode 7 is "Gabriel no Kazoeuta" (ガヴリールの数え歌, The Gabriel Counting Song) performed by Ōnishi. The anime ran for 12 episodes and was released across three four-episode BD/DVD volumes. Two original video animation episodes were released with the first and third BD/DVD volumes, released on March 24, 2017, and May 24, 2017, respectively.

==== Episode list ====
No.	Title	Original release date
1	"The Day I Knew I Could Never Go Back"; Transliteration: "Mō Modorenai to Shitta Ano Hi" (Japanese: もう戻れないと知ったあの日)	January 9, 2017
Graduating from Angel School at the top of her class, an angel named Gabriel White Tenma is sent down to the human world to live as a human and guide people towards happiness. Upon discovering the world of video games, however, Gabriel quickly becomes addicted and degenerates into a slacker. This proves to be an annoyance for her neighbor, a demon named Vignette April Tsukinose. Meanwhile, another demon named Satanichia Kurumizawa McDowell tries to do demonic deeds, only to discover the acts of indecency by Gabriel outweigh her own. Later, Vignette gets Gabriel to clean up her room, bringing to light that she herself doesn't act very demonic, and soon comes up against a cockroach. Elsewhere, another angel named Raphiel Ainsworth Shiraha takes an interest in teasing Satanichia as she comes up against a stray dog.
2	"The Angel, the Demon, and the Class President"; Transliteration: "Tenshi to Akuma to Iinchō" (Japanese: 天使と悪魔と委員長)	January 16, 2017
Gabriel, Vignette, and Satanichia visit the school cafeteria for the first time to try some udon, where Satanichia's "taste-deafness" comes to light. Later, class 1-B's class president, Machiko, becomes bewildered when she overhears Gabriel and confuses her report to heaven for a careers survey. Later, Vignette tries to deal with Gabriel and Satanichia as they end up diverting from the planned recipe during cookery class. Afterwards, Raphiel becomes Satanichia's apprentice, sneakily manipulating her into following her orders instead.
3	"Friends, Work, and the Summer of Bugs"; Transliteration: "Tomo to Kinrō to Mushisasare no Natsu no Hi" (Japanese: 友と勤労と虫刺されの夏の日)	January 23, 2017
Wanting to earn more money for her games, Gabriel takes up a part-time job at the Coffee Angel coffee shop, her crass attitude proving bewildering for the shop's master. Meanwhile, Vignette spends some time with Raphiel to try and learn more about her. Later, Satanichia shows up at Coffee Angel, much to Gabriel's chagrin. On a sunny day, Gabriel becomes bothered by her broken air conditioner and a bunch of mosquitoes, spending the rest of the day at Vignette's house.
4	"Summer Vacation, Ho!"; Transliteration: "Iza Natsuyasumi" (Japanese: いざ夏休み)	January 30, 2017
The girls make plans to visit the beach for summer vacation, much to Gabriel's dismay. Despite having no experience with human beaches, the others attempt to show Gabriel the fun of playing at the beach. Later, as the girls get together to finish their summer homework, Vignette tells the others about how she came to meet Gabriel prior to her transition into a slob.
5	"The Angel Whose Illusions Were Shattered Like Hell"; Transliteration: "Sono Gensō o Kowasare Makutta Tenshi" (Japanese: その幻想を壊されまくった天使)	February 6, 2017
Tapris Sugarbell Chisaki, a middle school angel who strongly admired Gabriel, is shocked to see how much of a slob she has become. As Tapris believes this to be the work of a demon, Raphiel, looking for some amusement, decides to set her up against Satanichia, who smugly takes credit for Gabriel's downfall. After losing a game of Old Maid to Satanichia, Tapris finds comfort in Vignette's kindness, only to become distant when she learns that she is a demon. Afterwards, Tapris spends the night at Gabriel's apartment where she witnesses her slobbiness firsthand, but still gets a small glimmer of hope.
6	"Satania's Counterattack"; Transliteration: "Satānya no Gyakushū" (Japanese: サターニャの逆襲)	February 13, 2017
Wanting to get revenge on Gabriel, Satanichia buys a revolver from the Hell Shopping Network that causes whoever it shoots to wind up in a laughing fit. After this plan backfires on her, Satanichia faces Gabriel in a game of shogi, only to lose due to Gabriel playing by her own rules. Later, the class president winds up as Satanichia's sketching partner in art class, having to resort to riduculous demands to try to keep her motivated. On Halloween, the girls go trick-or-treating at Gabriel's apartment, where Vignette attempts to get Gabriel to wear one of her costumes.
7	"Vigne's Demonic Life"; Transliteration: "Vīne no Akuma-teki na Hibi" (Japanese: ヴィーネの悪魔的な日々)	February 20, 2017
With Vigne's allowance from Hell decreasing due to not acting like a demon, Vignette asks the coffee shop master for advice on how to perform bad deeds. Vigne attempts to get Gab to notice her bad deeds by appearing unkempt, leaving a pen on her desk, and not taking notes; however, Gab remains nonchalant to these actions. Later, Vignette struggles to get some sleep when she catches a cold, after which Gabriel pays her a visit.
8	"Fall School Life"; Transliteration: "Aki no Gakkō Seikatsu" (Japanese: 秋の学校生活)	February 27, 2017
Raphiel finds herself with an overly tight bra when the class has to take a physical fitness exam, having to restrain her movements to keep it from breaking. However, she ends up putting her dignity on the line in order to keep Satanichia from winning every event. Later, Vignette and Satanichia take part in an interview exam, with the latter following some bad advice from a book Gabriel recommended to her. On another day, Gabriel sits in on Machiko's cooking club in order to get a free meal, while Satanichia discovers one of Raphiel's weaknesses on the way home.
9	"Christmas and New Year's Eve Surprise"; Transliteration: "Seiya to Misoka ni Nanka Kita" (Japanese: 聖夜と晦日になんか来た)	March 6, 2017
Vignette tries to host a peaceful Christmas party without Satanichia realising the holiday's connections with the birth of Jesus Christ. Later on New Year's Eve, the girls make a visit to the shrine, where Gabriel gets drunk on amazake. Afterwards, as the girls make home visits to Heaven and Hell respectively, Gabriel attempts to sneak her entertainment devices past Heaven's security with little success.
10	"The Angels and Demons Return Home"; Transliteration: "Tenshi to Akuma Furusato ni Kaeru" (Japanese: 天使と悪魔故郷に帰る)	March 13, 2017
Upon returning home, Gabriel finds herself having to play various games with her younger sister, Haniel. Meanwhile, Vignette is shocked to find the baby monster she took in a year ago, Chappy, has grown to an enormous size, while Raphiel has to deal with her perverted butler Martiel. Later, Gabriel and Raphiel are called in to report on their findings in the human world, with Gabriel using her experience with online games as a reference point, before deciding to help Satanichia sneak into Heaven to relieve their boredom.
11	"Fun Forever After..."; Transliteration: "Tanoshī Hibi wa Itsumademo..." (Japanese: 楽しい日々はいつまでも……)	March 20, 2017
Satanichia ends up rescuing the stray dog that keeps stealing her melon bread from being taken to the pound, only to realise that her apartment doesn't allow pets. Having no money to move and unwilling to find another owner, Satanichia attempts to run away with the dog to find a new place to live. Luckily, Gabriel manages to convince the coffee shop master, who owns the apartment complex where Satanichia lives, to allow her to keep the dog at her place. Later, Tapris attempts to learn how to use a PC in order to help Gabriel finish her online games quicker, only to have to learn everything about computers from scratch. Later, Tapris joins the others for a takoyaki party before informing Gabriel that her older sister, Zelel, will be visiting.
12	"Gabriel DropOut!"; Transliteration: "Gavurīru Doroppuauto!" (Japanese: ガヴリールドロップアウト！)	March 27, 2017
Fearing that Zelel might destroy the world if she discovers she has become a fallen angel, Gabriel attempts to appease her by acting like a model little sister. This plan fails, however, as Zelel was already aware of Gabriel's transgressions. After a week of severe punishment, Gabriel returns to school as the model angel she used to be before her game addiction. Finding that they prefer the slobbish Gabriel, the others try to convert her back, only to discover she was putting on an act in front of Zelel (and that the "punishment" she underwent was a mere reprimand). When Zelel inevitably finds out about this ploy, she contemplates moving in with Gabriel in lieu of dragging her back to Heaven, only to get scared away by Satanichia's dog, allowing Gabriel to continue her lazy life in peace.
OVA–1	"A Steamy Special ~A Certain Demon's Plan to Defile an Angel's Pure Skin~"; Transliteration: "Yukemuri Ryojō-hen ~Tenshi no Kiyoraka na Hada ni Semaru Akuma no Wana~" (Japanese: 湯煙旅情編～天使の清らかな肌に迫る悪魔の罠～)	March 24, 2017
As the girls go on a trip to a hot spring inn, Satanichia seems determined to get Gabriel to get in the baths with her. After eventually managing to convince Gabriel to do so, Satanichia brings out a giant slime to attack her, only for it to ensare everyone else instead.
OVA–2	"An Angel's Gift"; Transliteration: "Tenshi no Okurimono" (Japanese: 天使の贈り物)	May 24, 2017
The girls meet a near-blind girl, who seems to recognise them as angels through her imperfect vision. As they each give the girl their support, they learn that she will be undergoing a risky operation which will either fix her eyesight or rob it completely. A few days later, the gang are shocked to discover the girl has been hit by a car, leaving her in critical condition. Wanting to save her, Gabriel goes against Heaven's rules and uses her angelic powers to save the girl and restore her eyesight. Managing to get away with light punishments for her actions, Gabriel is relieved to see the girl return to having a normal life.
