= Kotoura-san =

Japanese manga series

- Cover of the first manga volume

琴浦さん
- Genre: Romantic comedy, Drama, Supernatural
- Manga
- Written by: Enokizu
- Published by: Micro Magazine
- Imprint: Micro Magazine Comics
- Magazine: Manga Goccha; Megami Magazine
- Original run: October 14, 2010 – April 22, 2015
- Volumes: 7
- Anime television series
- Directed by: Masahiko Ohta
- Produced by: Jun Fukuda; Hiroshi Yoshida; Jiyū Ōgi; Kimihito Sekido; Masami Abe
- Written by: Takashi Aoshima
- Music by: Yasuhiro Misawa
- Studio: AIC Classic
- Licensed by: NA: NIS America
- Original network: CBC
- English network: SEA: Animax Asia
- Original run: January 11, 2013 – March 29, 2013
- Episodes: 12
- icon

Kotoura-san (琴浦さん) is a Japanese four-panel manga series written and illustrated by Enokizu. It was serialized in the web manga magazine Manga Goccha and the print manga magazine Megami from October 14, 2010, to April 22, 2015. Micro Magazine owns the web magazine, and is also the publisher of the series, which spanned seven bound volumes, released from 2012 to 2015. Kotoura-san is about a first year high school girl named Haruka Kotoura who has the ability to read minds. Growing up she has a horrible life but things turn around when she makes friends who accept her ability. One guy in particular named Yoshihisa Manabe also eventually takes a romantic interest in her.

An anime television adaptation was made from the manga by AIC Classic that aired from January 11 to March 29, 2013. Twelve episodes aired in all and included the addition of five bonus shorts called Haruka's Room (春香の部屋, Haruka no Heya). Outside of Japan only the anime adaptation was brought over and released in North America. The series was licensed under the name The Troubled Life of Miss Kotoura by NIS America, they released a Blu-ray subtitled collection on August 4, 2015. The English subtitled release received mixed to mostly positive reviews from critics.

== Plot ==
Haruka Kotoura is a 15-year-old girl who was born with the psychic ability to read minds. As a child she blurts out what people around her are thinking, too young to realize that these thoughts are the person's true feelings which upsets them when they are revealed in public. She is branded a compulsive liar by her teachers, ridiculed by her classmates and loses all of her friends. The strain gets to be too much on her parents as well after she inadvertently exposes that they are both having romantic affairs. Abandoned by her mother into the care of her grandfather, Haruka becomes a outcast and a recluse, distancing herself from everyone, concluding that she only brings people bad luck.

Things start to change when she starts high school and meets Yoshihisa Manabe. He is shown to be unfazed by Haruka's mind-reading ability but also has a perverted imagination. Yoshihisa offers her his friendship and vows to stand by her side regardless of the circumstances. He helps her make new friends and together they form the school's ESP Research Club. Haruka's life begins to change completely for the better which gives her newfound strength she never had. She is eventually able to overcome the teasing she has endured, and face her mother regarding her past. The series concludes with her confessing her love to Yoshihisa with support from her friends.

== Characters ==
=== Main characters ===
Haruka Kotoura (琴浦 春香, Kotoura Haruka)
Voiced by: Hisako Kanemoto
Haruka is a fifteen year old girl who was born with the psychic ability to read minds at a young age. She becomes an outcast by her friends/classmates when she starts blurting out their thoughts, not realizing that these are their true feelings that they may or may not want revealed. Her mother eventually abandons her when she obliviously exposes an affair between own parents. This causes Haruka to conclude that she only brings people trouble, and the best way to prevent hurting herself and/or others is to close her heart to people. When she enters high school she meets a guy named Yoshihisa Manabe who accepts her mind reading ability. He helps her make friends which gradually makes Haruka a stronger person. She is vulnerable though to Yoshihisa's lewd fantasies which causes her to become incredibly flustered when teased. Over the series she develops romantic feelings for Manabe and the two confess their love for one another at the end of the series.
Yoshihisa Manabe (真鍋 義久, Manabe Yoshihisa)
Voiced by: Jun Fukushima
Yoshihisa is one of Haruka's classmates who isn't bothered by her ability to read his mind. He is a guy with a big heart but frequently has lewd thoughts about Haruka which he uses to tease her. He is shown to truly love Haruka though whom he deeply cares for. Yoshihisa tries his best to understand her problem while struggling to deepen their relationship. He later forms an unlikely bond with Haruka's grandfather Zenzou, who encourages his perverted side in order to get his granddaughter married. Yoshihisa finally confesses his love to Haruka in the end after being playfully scolded for not saying it sooner.
Yuriko Mifune (御舟 百合子, Mifune Yuriko)
Voiced by: Kana Hanazawa
Yuriko is the president, and creator of the school's ESP Research Club. She invites Haruka upon learning about her ability to join, but initially also has an ulterior motive for doing so. She is fixated on vindicating her mother and her family after her psychic mother committed suicide. The media had accused her of being a fake, so she ended her life to escape the constant ridicule, leaving young Yuriko devastated. Yuriko finds an opportunity in Haruka and shows her only the thoughts she wants her to see. During the series she considers Haruka a true friend which leads her to recognize how selfish she was to which she is forgiven. Yuriko also has unrequited feelings for Daichi Muroto, her childhood friend.
Daichi Muroto (室戸 大智, Muroto Daichi)
Voiced by: Hiro Shimono
Daichi is the ESP Research Club's vice president, and Mifune's childhood friend. He is known for his short height and intelligence with things having to do with technology. Daichi is also surprisingly adept at investigation which he uses to see behind Yuriko's plans. While he doesn't interfere with her intentions, he does try to give her advice on how to move forward. Deep down he is shown to be a sensitive person who can "empathize well with others". Mifune shows strong romantic feelings towards him, but he is oblivious to her affection.
Hiyori Moritani (森谷 ヒヨリ, Moritani Hiyori)
Voiced by: Yurika Kubo
Hiyori is Yoshihisa's childhood friend and classmate, often nicknamed Moriya. She is in deeply in love with Yoshihisa and initially resents Haruka for gaining his attention and becoming romantically interested in Haruka, rather than herself. After Yoshihisa makes her realize what she has done to Haruka, Hiyori reconciles with Haruka and befriends her, even later joining the ESP Research Club. Out of the three girls in the ESP Society, she is the only one who cannot cook. She occasionally has a fearsome aura like a demon that is used to keep Yoshihisa's perversion in check, but she has a habit of panicking in the face of adversity despite her practices in martial arts. She owns her own dojo which led to bullying when she was younger.

=== Supporting characters ===
Zenzou Kotoura (琴浦 善三, Kotoura Zenzō)
Voiced by: Tomomichi Nishimura
Haruka's very wealthy grandfather. One of the few people to stick by her after Kumiko disowned her. He is slightly perverted, having dirty thoughts about his kinship with Haruka.
Head priest (和尚, Oshō)
Voiced by: Yutaka Nakano
A monk who is a family friend at a shrine temple in Haruka's hometown. His encounter with Haruka has led to him taking an interest in esper abilities.
Kumiko Kotoura (琴浦 久美子, Kotoura Kumiko)
Voiced by: Kikuko Inoue
Haruka's mother. Initially kind-hearted and caring, she becomes more and more stressed because she can't understand Haruka's special ability or deal with the situations it inadvertently caused. She reacted to her husband's increasing emotional distance by cheating on him, and when it is discovered that Haruka's father was also unfaithful, they divorce. She deals with her moral failings and weakness of character by rejecting young Haruka and disowning her. She mentally apologises to Haruka and calls herself a 'Weak Mother.' Kumiko utterly regretted disowning Haruka, blaming herself again and again. At the end of the series, she reconciles with Haruka after they both get all their pent-up feeling out of their system.
Gantetsu Ishiyama (石山 巌鉄, Ishiyama Gantetsu)
Voiced by: Takayuki Sugō
A police detective. He appears to be familiar with the events that occurred surrounding Yuriko's mother, although he himself is skeptic of supernatural abilities.
Aki Tsukino (月野 亜紀, Tsukino Aki)
Voiced by: Akeno Watanabe
Detective Ishiyama's partner who is a bit clumsy and usually hungry. During her childhood, she was bullied a lot because of her height, which caused her to develop a violent split personality. Tsukino later began attacking high school girls under the influence of her other personality and soon targeted Haruka. However, Haruka was able to get her feelings across to the true Tsukino, who overcomes her other side and turns herself in.

== Media ==
=== Manga ===
The manga by Enokizu was serialized in the web magazine Manga Goccha and the manga magazine Megami from October 14, 2010, to April 22, 2015. Seven tankōbon volumes were released between 2012 and 2015.

=== Anime ===
An anime adaptation by AIC Classic aired in Japan between January 11 and March 29, 2013, and was simulcast by Crunchyroll. The opening theme is "Sonna Koto Ura no Mata Urabanashi Desho?" (そんなこと裏のまた裏話でしょ?; 'You Want To Hear the Story Behind the Backstory, Right?') by Megumi Nakajima and the main ending theme is "Kibō no Hana" (希望の花; 'Flower of Hope') by Haruka Chisuga. The ending theme for episode five is "The ESP Club's Theme" (ESP研のテーマ, Īesupī Ken no Tēma) by Kana Hanazawa, Hisako Kanemoto, Jun Fukushima, Hiro Shimono and Yurika Kubo, whilst the ending theme for episode six is "Tsurupeta" (つるぺた; 'Flat Chest') by Kanemoto. There is an insert song in episode 11 titled "Sunao" (素直) sung by Megumi Nakajima. NIS America has licensed the series in North America under the title The Troubled Life of Miss Kotoura and released a subtitled Blu-ray collection on August 4, 2015.

No.	Title	Original air date
1	"Kotoura-san and Manabe-kun"; Transliteration: "Kotoura-san to Manabe-kun" (Japanese: 琴浦さんと真鍋くん)	January 11, 2013
Haruka Kotoura is a girl who was born with ESP, the ability to read minds. As she has no real understanding of this ability and tends to blurt out everyone's thoughts, she becomes ridiculed by her classmates and even disowned by her parents, eventually leading her to live alone as a recluse. Years later, Haruka transfers into a new high school. Not getting along with the other students, she is approached by a dim-witted boy named Yoshihisa Manabe, who remains eager to hang out with her despite her being able to read his dirty thoughts. After Haruka ends up saving Yoshihisa from a speeding truck, she confesses about how her ability ruined her life and left her afraid of hurting those close to her. Yoshihisa responds that he will stay by her side no matter what happens and the two eventually become friends.
2	"The First..."; Transliteration: "Hajimete no..." (Japanese: 初めての……)	January 18, 2013
Haruka is approached by an upperclassman named Yuriko Mifune, who invites her to join the ESP Research Club, along with Yoshihisa and their other current member, Daichi Muroto. During one of the club meetings, Yuriko willingly shows Haruka a glimpse of one of her darkest memories. Yuriko later reveals that her mother was a clairvoyant who was accused of being a fake and committed suicide, driving Yuriko to try and prove the existence of psychics. Yuriko decides to use Haruka to hold a fortune telling booth, which initially proves difficult when Haruka cannot see her targets, but it soon proves popular once Haruka takes charge. When Hiyori Moritani, her classmate who is currently in love with Yoshihisa, takes the seat, she becomes resentful of Haruka. When Yoshihisa and Yuriko discover her actions towards Haruka, Yoshihisa confronts Hiyori and reveals that he likes Haruka. Thanking her friends, Haruka officially joins the ESP Research Club.
3	"So Happy, So Fun"; Transliteration: "Ureshikute, Tanoshikute" (Japanese: 嬉しくて、楽しくて)	January 25, 2013
As Haruka tries to keep the fact that she overheard Yoshihisa's confession from him, she and the others go to a karaoke place, where it is soon revealed that Haruka is completely tone deaf. The next evening, as Haruka plans to make a home-made lunch for Yoshihisa, Hiyori has some of her karate members slightly attack Yoshihisa, but it goes disastrously wrong and they end up hospitalizing him. As word of Yoshihisa's situation reaches the class the next day, Haruka hears Hiyori's stressed thoughts as she fears being found out by everyone. However, Haruka instead chooses to encourage her before going to visit Yoshihisa in hospital. After hearing Yoshihisa's thoughts about how he did not want to get Haruka involved, she feels devastated that she is just hurting others in her place and moves away.
4	"Changing World"; Transliteration: "Kawaru Sekai" (Japanese: 変わる世界)	February 1, 2013
A week has passed since Haruka's disappearance and Yoshihisa has been unable to contact her. Thanks to Daichi's help, the ESP Research Club track Haruka down to the last station she left on. Having forgotten to book a hotel, the group are offered to spend the night at a shrine run by its head priest. By coincidence, they find he is a family friend of Haruka who, upon hearing Yoshihisa's pleas, takes them to Haruka's family home where she is staying with her grandfather, Zenzou. As Haruka is unable to face them, she hears Yoshihisa's desire to be with her, leaving her open to get caught. Haruka explains how she does not want to go back as she does not want to hurt anyone and attempts to run off again. Just then, Hiyori arrives and reconciles with Haruka for her jealous actions, while also thanking her for allowing her to change her ways. Accepting her thanks, Haruka decides to go back to school.
5	"School Paradise?"; Transliteration: "Gakuen Tengoku?" (Japanese: 学園天国？)	February 8, 2013
As Haruka starts her school life again, Hiyori decides to join the ESP Research Club, with Yuriko deciding to hold a welcome party at Haruka's new apartment. After being distracted by an amusing picture of Hiyori that Yoshihisa showed her, Haruka ends up getting put into a relay for the upcoming sports festival, so the gang start training her for the event. As the day of the sports festival comes, Yoshihisa manages to rally up the class to give Haruka their support, although she ends up failing regardless.
6	"Summer Vacation!"; Transliteration: "Natsuyasumi!" (Japanese: 夏休み!)	February 15, 2013
The gang travel to Haruka's hometown for summer vacation, though to their surprise, they are taken to an abandoned hospital. After being chased by some supposed monsters, they discover the hospital is actually part of a theme park Zenzou made for Haruka's arrival. The next day, the gang head to a private beach, where Haruka ends up getting pulled at sea and almost drowning, prompting Yoshihisa to rescue her. After sharing lunch together and enjoying some fireworks, Haruka gives her thanks to the others for showing her how fun summer vacation can be. Meanwhile, Haruka's mother, Kumiko, is seen watching them from above.
7	"In This World, I..."; Transliteration: "Kono Sekai ni Watashi wa" (Japanese: この世界に私は)	February 22, 2013
As Haruka deals with the curious effects of Hiyori's cooking, the head priest explains to Zenzou that he had brought Kumiko to see how Haruka was doing, but she still believed that she would one day cause misery with her ability. Before heading back home the next day, Haruka visits her old room and gives thanks to the head priest for his help. After being unable to get a hold of Yoshihisa after they get back, Haruka and Yuriko decide to spy on him, discovering he is working at a part-time job for reasons she cannot identify. Whilst trying to figure out what Yoshihisa is hiding, Haruka reads Yuriko's memories on when she first became friends with Daichi, who always had faith in her mother's psychic ability. After summer vacation ends and the new term begins, Yoshihisa reveals he was saving money in order to prepare a surprise birthday party for Haruka.
8	"It's Not a Date"; Transliteration: "Dēto janaimon" (Japanese: デートじゃないもん)	March 1, 2013
After receiving a locket from Yoshihisa for her birthday, Haruka ends up getting a cold once October rolls in. As Yoshihisa decides to look after her, he discovers Haruka's cold is affecting her mind-reading ability. As Haruka is unaware of this, Yoshihisa initially sees this as an opportunity to be as perverted as he wants, but cannot bring himself to go through with it. Although Haruka eventually recovers from her cold, her ability still has to. As punishment for lying to Haruka, Yuriko sets the two of them up on a date. They visit many different spots, with Haruka picking out a photo of the two of them to put in her locket. Near the end of the date, however, Haruka passes by someone and ends up reading the person's horrifying and violent thoughts, the shock of which causes her to fall unconscious.
9	"Everyone is Around Me"; Transliteration: "Mawari ni wa Minna ga" (Japanese: まわりにはみんなが)	March 8, 2013
After being discharged from hospital, Haruka learns of a series of attacks on high school girls, and wonders if the mind she read before passing out may have been the criminal's. Too afraid to be alone that night, Haruka asks Yoshihisa to stay at her house, but Yoshihisa's planned perversions are stymied by Hiyori's arrival. The next morning the group is approached by a pair of police officers, who are questioning the students about the attacks. Haruka is left feeling depressed about not being able to say something since the police would not likely believe that psychics exist. Later on, a discussion between Hiyori and Haruka between classes causes a rumor to spread that Haruka knows something about the attacks, which puts her at odds with her schoolmates. Zenzou, having been called by Yuriko to help cheer Haruka up, takes her and the others to dinner at a hotel, where Kumiko coincidentally shows up on a date. When she begins to berate Haruka for allegedly using her powers on her, Yoshihisa and the others rush to support her, with Yoshihisa's perversity even managing to coax Kumiko into unconsciously showing concern for Haruka. After Kumiko leaves, Zenzou offers to call off dinner out of concern for the gang, but they decide to stay. Later that night, Hiyori is in total shock after seeing one of her classmates lying in a pool of blood in an alley, and screams after seeing her blood on her own hands.
10	"But You're Not Here"; Transliteration: "Dakedo Anata wa Inai" (Japanese: だけどあなたはいない)	March 15, 2013
Upon arriving at school, Haruka and Yoshihisa learn that Hiyori has been arrested upon suspicion of being the attacker. The two visit the police station and vouch for Hiyori's innocence, which helps calm Hiyori's nerves. After one of the detectives, Tsukino, lets Haruka and the others in to support her during the interrogation, Hiyori explains how she had tried to get her friends to stop spreading rumors about Haruka, only to discover she had been attacked and accused of the crime herself. Not wanting Hiyori to suffer because of her anymore, Haruka decides to tell the detectives what she knows. Despite convincing the detective of her ability, he reveals he cannot let Hiyori free until they find tangible evidence, leading to Yuriko to bring up her mother. Feeling they can't rely on the police, Yuriko decides they should find the true culprit themselves. Although Haruka agrees to help, Yoshihisa objects to it because he doesn't want to see Haruka getting hurt, leading the two to have a fight, after which Yoshihisa stops visiting the clubroom. Later that evening, Haruka runs into Tsukino, talking a little about her desire to help. The next day, Hiyori is released due to another attack taking place whilst she was incarcerated, though Haruka decides she still wants to find the culprit. After learning of a potentially dangerous alley from Tsukino, Yuriko offers to use herself as bait to draw out the culprit. As Haruka starts hearing the attacker's thoughts, Yuriko is attacked by the culprit.
11	"Stand By Me"; Transliteration: "Sutando Bai Mī" (Japanese: スタンド·バイ·ミー)	March 22, 2013
Daichi protects Yuriko from the attack, forcing the attacker to retreat when people start showing up. Haruka once again feels guilty about what had happened, not wanting Yoshihisa getting involved having read his thoughts of concern over her. She ends up wandering around until she reaches a park, where she once again encounters Tsukino, who takes her to her apartment. Meanwhile, Hiyori informs Yoshihisa on the situation, hazing him for not staying by Haruka's side. Hiyori then confesses that she loves Yoshihisa, to which he responds that he loves Haruka, which Hiyori believes is the way it should be. After Yoshihisa heads off to search for Haruka, Hiyori laments over her rejection. Meanwhile, after recovering from his injury and assuring Yuriko, Daichi deduces that the attacker is in fact Tsukino. Yuriko's phone call to Haruka helps her avoid an attack from Tsukino, who has a violent split personality that emerged from years of bullying. As Haruka is chased into a corner on the terrace, Yoshihisa comes to her rescue and manages to ward off Tsukino's attack. Haruka then calls out to the true Tsukino, reminding her that there will be people who care for her, enabling her to overcome her dark side, after which she turns herself in to the police for the crimes that she committed.
12	"The Things I Want to Tell You"; Transliteration: "Tsutaetai Kokoro" (Japanese: 伝えたい言葉(ココロ))	March 29, 2013
Some time after the previous incident, Yuriko suddenly tells the others that she is disbanding the ESP Society and replacing it with the New ESP Society, which is more or less the same thing. During the commotion, Haruka learns of Hiyori's failed confession to Yoshihisa, along with his feelings for Haruka. As the others head to book a room for a karaoke place, Yuriko expresses her apology towards Haruka, who tells her she has no reason to apologize. As their discussion turns to love, Haruka realises that Yoshihisa has not directly told her he loves her yet. Upon returning home, Haruka finds Kumiko waiting for her. Haruka finally speaks her mind to Kumiko, and the two proceed to get everything out of their system. As Kumiko takes a nap, Haruka reads her mind and learns how she really felt at the time she left home. Kumiko leaves early the next morning, but leaves behind some breakfast for Haruka. Later, Haruka talks with Hiyori about how she should confess to Yoshihisa, eventually realizing she should just let it come naturally. On a snowy night, Haruka and Yoshihisa formally confess to each other.

Bonus episodes

Haruka's Room (春香の部屋, Haruka no Heya) is a series of introductory web episodes that were streamed online between December 7, 2012, and January 11, 2013.

No.	Title	Original air date
1	"Episode 1"	December 7, 2012
Haruka interviews herself.
2	"Episode 2"	December 14, 2012
Yoshihisa is introduced, embarrassing Haruka with his fantasies.
3	"Episode 3"	December 21, 2012
Yuriko is introduced, getting passionate about ESP discussion.
4	"Episode 4"	December 28, 2012
Daichi is introduced, slacking off when not in the camera's view.
5	"Episode 5"	January 4, 2013
Hiyori is introduced, having her dreams shot down by Haruka.
6	"Episode 6"	January 11, 2013
Each of the characters give their two cents on the last episode.

== Reception ==
The English subtitled release of Kotoura-san (aka: The Troubled Life of Miss Kotoura) received various reviews from sources that do reviews for anime. Theron Martin from Anime News Network gave the series a B+ rating saying that while some may find the opening 10 minutes "overkill", the series is a great mix of "effectively funny, sincere, and heartfelt content". Martin also praised the musical score, but called the artwork mediocre. Chris Beveridge from The Fandom Post also gave the series a B+ rating saying that it has "a lot going for it". Beveridge points out that it is engaging to watch how Haruka comes out of her indescribable childhood with a largely positive attitude. While she doesn't do it alone, he says that there are many moments where she "stands for herself" in order to do things she wouldn't normally do. Tim Jones from THEM anime reviews gave the series a "very low" 2/5 star rating calling it rushed with no pacing at all. In his review he criticized the usual high school troupes such as "festivals, beaches, fights, perverted male fantasy sequences, and parent troubles", and goes on to say that many of the characters' arcs are left "unfinished or just brushed off".

Some reviewers did not review the entire series; Matthew Lee from Screen Anarchy reviewed the first four episodes. He called the opening to the series the "best ever" saying that it does more storytelling in those ten minutes than other shows may do in an entire season. Lee goes on to say that the odd genre mix of 1950s science fiction, and oversexed high-school comedy are used to make the series worth watching. Andy Hanley from UK Anime Network gave the first three episodes a 4 out of 10 rating calling them "relentlessly depressing". To the converse of the previous review, Hanley said that the first twenty minutes were "genuinely horrible to watch", he goes on to say that the "half baked" comedy doesn't make up for the depression.
