= YuruYuri =

Japanese manga series

- Cover of the first manga volume featuring (left to right) Kyoko Toshino, Chinatsu Yoshikawa, Yui Funami and Akari Akaza

ゆるゆり
- Genre: Comedy; Slice of life; Yuri
- Manga
- Written by: Namori
- Published by: Ichijinsha
- Magazine: Comic Yuri Hime S; Comic Yuri Hime
- Original run: June 18, 2008 – present
- Volumes: 24
- Manga

Reset!
- Written by: Namori
- Published by: Ichijinsha
- Magazine: Caramel Febri
- Original run: July 24, 2010 – January 25, 2011 (on hiatus)
- Anime television series
- Directed by: Masahiko Ohta
- Produced by: Seitarou Nakamura; Ryousuke Oono; Taku Yoshizawa; Youko Kawahara
- Written by: Takashi Aoshima
- Music by: Yasuhiro Misawa
- Studio: Doga Kobo
- Licensed by: NA: NIS America
- Original network: TV Tokyo, TSC, TVh, TVA, TVO, AT-X
- Original run: July 5, 2011 – September 20, 2011
- Episodes: 12
- Anime television series

YuruYuri♪♪
- Directed by: Masahiko Ohta
- Produced by: Seitarou Nakamura; Ryousuke Oono; Taku Yoshizawa; Youko Kawahara
- Written by: Takashi Aoshima
- Music by: Yasuhiro Misawa
- Studio: Doga Kobo
- Licensed by: NA: NIS America
- Original network: AT-X; TV Aichi; TV Hokkaido; TV Osaka; TV Setouchi; TV Tokyo
- Original run: July 2, 2012 – September 17, 2012
- Episodes: 12
- Manga

Ōmuro-ke
- Written by: Namori
- Published by: Ichijinsha
- Magazine: Nico Nico Seiga; Niconico Yuri Hime; Pixiv
- Original run: July 2, 2012 – present
- Volumes: 8
- Original video animation

YuruYuri Nachuyachumi!
- Directed by: Hiroyuki Hata
- Written by: Michiko Yokote
- Music by: Yoshiaki Fujisawa
- Studio: TYO Animations
- Released: November 29, 2014 (theater); February 18, 2015 (BD/DVD)
- Runtime: 64 minutes
- Anime television series

YuruYuri Nachuyachumi!+
- Directed by: Hiroyuki Hata
- Written by: Hiroyuki Hata; Makoto Fukami
- Music by: Yoshiaki Fujisawa
- Studio: TYO Animations
- Original run: August 21, 2015 – September 18, 2015
- Episodes: 2
- Anime television series

YuruYuri San☆Hai!
- Directed by: Hiroyuki Hata
- Produced by: Seitarou Nakamura; Ryousuke Oono; Youko Kawahara; Satoshi Fukao; Masayo Kudou; Masakatsu Oomuro; Mika Shimizu; Ryousuke Tsuboi
- Written by: Hiroyuki Hata; Makoto Fukami
- Music by: Yoshiaki Fujisawa
- Studio: TYO Animations
- Licensed by: NA: Crunchyroll
- Original network: TV Tokyo, TVQ, TVh, TVO, TVA, TVS, AT-X
- Original run: October 6, 2015 – December 21, 2015
- Episodes: 12
- Original net animation

MiniYuri
- Directed by: Seiya Miyajima
- Written by: Takahiro
- Music by: Yasuhiro Misawa
- Studio: DMM.futureworks; W-Toon Studio
- Released: September 25, 2019 – October 16, 2019
- Episodes: 4
- Original video animation

YuruYuri,
- Directed by: Daigo Yamagishi
- Produced by: Masayo Kudou; Kazuyoshi Nishikawa; Teppei Nojima; Kento Yoshida; Noriko Itou; Kento Hoshino
- Written by: Takahiro
- Music by: Yasuhiro Misawa
- Studio: Lay-duce
- Released: November 13, 2019
- Runtime: 31 minutes
- Anime film series

Ōmuro-ke: Dear Sisters; Ōmuro-ke: Dear Friends
- Directed by: Naoyuki Tatsuwa
- Produced by: Ryouma Fukuhara; Kazuyoshi Nishikawa; Shunsuke Matsuda; Shougo Sakata
- Written by: Masahiro Yokotani
- Music by: Yūsuke Shirato
- Studio: Passione; Studio Lings
- Released: February 2, 2024 – June 21, 2024
- Runtime: 43 minutes (both films)
- Films: 2
- icon

YuruYuri (ゆるゆり; lit. 'Easygoing Yuri'), also known as Happy Go Lily, is a Japanese manga series written and illustrated by Namori. It began serialization in Ichijinsha's Comic Yuri Hime S magazine on June 12, 2008, before being moved over to Comic Yuri Hime in September 2010.

An anime adaptation by Doga Kobo aired in Japan between July and September 2011, with a second season airing between July and September 2012. An original video animation by TYO Animations was released on February 18, 2015, followed by two television specials that aired between August and September of the same year. A third season by TYO Animations aired between October and December 2015. Another OVA by Lay-duce, announced to celebrate the manga's tenth anniversary, was released on November 13, 2019, and was televised on AT-X on February 23, 2020. A spin-off original net animation, titled MiniYuri, by DMM.futureworks and W-Toon Studio premiered on YouTube on September 25, 2019. A spin-off web manga, Ōmuro-ke, began releasing on Nico Nico Seiga in July 2012. Two anime film adaptations of Ōmuro-ke by Passione and Studio Lings premiered in February and June 2024.

== Plot ==
Taking place at the fictional Nanamori Middle School in Takaoka, Toyama, the series revolves around the daily lives of the Amusement Club (ごらく部, Goraku-bu) consisting of Akari Akaza, her childhood friends Kyōko Toshinō and Yui Funami, and her classmate Chinatsu Yoshikawa along with the school's Student Council, which is made up of its own set of characters.

== Characters ==
=== Amusement Club ===
Akari Akaza (赤座 あかり, Akaza Akari)
Voiced by: Shiori Mikami
Akari is a polite, fun-loving, and benevolent redhead. Despite being portrayed as the main protagonist of the series, she is often overshadowed by the other characters and lacks prominence in the spotlight. She is well-known for her trademark hair buns, and her unassuming presence is humorously teased by the other characters.
Kyōko Toshinō (歳納 京子, Toshinō Kyōko)
Voiced by: Yuka Ōtsubo
Kyōko is an optimistic and energetic girl who is one year older than Akari, and is the more substantial main protagonist. She is childhood friends with Akari and Yui. She has a lively personality and never passes up an opportunity for a laugh, which often involves causing Yui trouble. Kyōko has a crush on Chinatsu, who resembles her favorite anime character, Mirakurun. She is the object of affection for Ayano, the student council vice president, who is her opposite in many ways. Despite her lazy attitude, she often gets high scores on tests after cram sessions. She enjoys eating rum raisin ice cream and is also a talented doujin artist.
Yui Funami (船見 結衣, Funami Yui)
Voiced by: Minami Tsuda
Yui is a cool-headed girl who often acts as the voice of reason in the Amusement Club. She is a childhood friend of Akari and Kyōko. Yui has a passion for video games and is portrayed as an exceptional cook, leaving Chinatsu enamored with her food. She is a reliable and dependable friend who lives alone in an apartment complex. Although Yui never openly admits it, she occasionally experiences a sense of loneliness, particularly when Kyōko is not around.
Chinatsu Yoshikawa (吉川 ちなつ, Yoshikawa Chinatsu)
Voiced by: Rumi Ōkubo
Chinatsu is Akari's classmate. Originally interested in joining the Tea Ceremony Club, she ends up joining the Amusement Club because the former club was already disbanded. Kyōko, who has a crush on her due to her resemblance to the anime character Mirakurun, often pursues her. However, Chinatsu herself has a passionate crush on Yui, whom she looks up to and often fantasizes about. While generally cute, benevolent, and overly happy, especially in Yui's presence, she can sometimes be selfish and occasionally show dark thoughts. Her lack of artistic skills can be quite disturbing to others and frequently leaves them horrified and in shock whenever she tries to draw something.

=== Student Council ===
Ayano Sugiura (杉浦 綾乃, Sugiura Ayano)
Voiced by: Saki Fujita
Ayano is the Student Council's vice president, known for her uptight and high-strung demeanor. She tends to hide her true feelings for Kyōko, often referring to her by her full name and exhibiting occasional acts of hostility. However, this behavior is unintentional, as Ayano is not comfortable openly expressing her affection. Despite being a diligent student who sees herself as Kyōko's rival, Ayano is consistently outperformed by Kyōko in tests, despite Kyōko's seemingly carefree attitude. Privately, Ayano harbors romantic and affectionate feelings for Kyōko, but she perceives showing her friendly and responsive side as a weakness. While Ayano may not openly display it, she genuinely cares about those around her and is selfless, often sacrificing her time and energy for others' sake. She also inadvertently makes puns that elicit laughter from Yui. Ayano's fondness for crème caramels is evident, as she keeps one refrigerated in the Student Council's room, although it often ends up being consumed by Kyōko or Sakurako.
Chitose Ikeda (池田 千歳, Ikeda Chitose)
Voiced by: Aki Toyosaki
Chitose is a member of the Student Council who is normally seen with Ayano. Despite her gentle disposition, she is a passionate yuri fangirl and often imagines romantic pairings, especially involving Kyōko and Ayano. Whenever she starts fantasizing, Chitose removes her glasses, and these daydreams cause her to have near-fatal nosebleeds. As Ayano's closest friend, Chitose is fully aware of Ayano's feelings for Kyōko and actively supports their getting together, although Ayano herself is often unaware of Chitose's efforts. She speaks in a soft Kansai dialect and likes tsukemono (Japanese pickled vegetables). She has a low tolerance for alcohol and tends to go on kissing sprees whenever she gets intoxicated. In the anime, this is only portrayed through alcohol-filled chocolates, however.
Sakurako Ohmuro (大室 櫻子, Ōmuro Sakurako)
Voiced by: Emiri Katō
Sakurako is an enthusiastic candidate for the position of Student Council vice president with a complex for her petite build. Having been childhood friends since kindergarten, she shares a close bond with Himawari. Although the two view each other as rivals and are competing for the student council vice president role, their constant argument show that they actually consider each other as friends and share a deep affection. In terms of schoolwork, Sakurako hates it and exhibits even greater laziness than Kyōko. When Sakurako is confronted with homework assignments, she often throws tantrums.
Himawari Furutani (古谷 向日葵, Furutani Himawari)
Voiced by: Suzuko Mimori
Himawari is another candidate vying for the position of Student Council vice president. She is well-endowed, which often leads to teasing from Sakurako, who is jealous of her early physical development. Despite her graceful demeanor, refined speech, and use of sophisticated vocabulary, Himawari does not come from a wealthy background. She is the opposite of her childhood friend Sakurako, with whom she frequently starts arguments. However, her tendency to speak directly and aggressively only toward Sakurako reflects the deep intimacy the two share. As the series progresses, Himawari holds affection for Sakurako and often assists her with school assignments.
Rise Matsumoto (松本 りせ, Matsumoto Rise)
Voiced by: Saori Gotō
Rise is the current student council president with tiny presence who often speaks in a whispering, quiet voice that only a few people understand, including Nana. She is Nana's "Explosive Friend" because she always suffers the explosions she causes.

=== Family members ===
Mari Funami (船見 まり, Funami Mari)
Voiced by: Maaya Uchida
Mari is the daughter of one of Yui's relatives. She is a fan of Mirakurun and initially mistook Chinatsu for her, but she does not take kindly to Chinatsu after learning that her personality does not match her image.
Kaede Furutani (古谷 楓, Furutani Kaede)
Voiced by: Aya Uchida
Himawari's six-year-old sister, Kaede is shown to be quite even-tempered and wise beyond her years.
Chizuru Ikeda (池田 千鶴, Ikeda Chizuru)
Voiced by: Momo Kuraguchi
Chitose's twin sister, who looks identical to her except for eye color, is shown to be very cold and distant towards most people, though she has a strong bond with her sibling. Much like Chitose, she often takes off her glasses to invoke yuri fantasies, pairing Ayano with Chitose and drooling instead of having nosebleeds. She strongly dislikes Kyōko, who constantly tries to play pranks on her and is seemingly a barrier against her fantasies.
Akane Akaza (赤座 あかね, Akaza Akane)
Voiced by: Yui Horie
Akane is Akari's nineteen-year-old older sister who attends a university. She is secretly infatuated with Akari, with her room almost completely covered in photos of her. Akane often does various perverted things with her belongings when she is not around and reading many doujins about sisterly incest.
Tomoko Yoshikawa (吉川 ともこ, Yoshikawa Tomoko)
Voiced by: Ayano Ishikawa
Chinatsu's older sister. She is a friend of Akane and has strong feelings for her.
Nadeshiko Ohmuro (大室 撫子, Ōmuro Nadeshiko)
Voiced by: Chiwa Saitō
Nadeshiko is Sakurako's eighteen-year-old intelligent and responsible older sister. Like Sakurako, she also has a petite build but also taller. According to November 2011 issue of Yurihime comic, Nadeshiko is in a romantic relationship with one of her friends, though it has not yet been revealed with whom.
Hanako Ohmuro (大室 花子, Ōmuro Hanako)
Voiced by: Rina Hidaka
Hanako is Sakurako's eight-year-old younger sister who is an elementary school student. She acts mature for her age, but also has some childish tendencies. The Ohmuro sisters tend to think Sakurako is lazy and abrasive, but they are shown to miss her when she is not around.

=== Others ===
Nana Nishigaki (西垣 奈々, Nishigaki Nana)
Voiced by: Ryoko Shiraishi
Nana is a faculty member at Nanamori Middle School who is constantly trying various experiments, often using Rise as a test subject and has a love for explosions, which are generally caused by her experiments. She is one of the few people who can understand Rise's quiet voice.
Hiro Takaoka (高岡 ひろ, Takaoka Hiro)
Voiced by: Haruka Yamazaki
Hiro is Akari and Chinatsu's classmate who admires Kyōko's doujin works and is the heroine of Namori's other manga, Reset!.
Aoi Isurugi (葵石動, Isurugi Aoi)
Aoi is Akari and Chinatsu's classmate who is trying to find a way to make money. She is the secondary protagonist of the spin-off Reset! and Hiro Takaoka's best friend.
Ai Miwa (三輪 藍, Miwa Ai)
Voiced by: Nao Tōyama
Nadeshiko's classmate.
Miho Yaeno (八重野 美穂, Yaeno Miho)
Voiced by: Aoi Yūki
Nadeshiko's classmate.
Megumi Sonokawa (園川 めぐみ, Sonokawa Megumi)
Voiced by: Sumire Uesaka
Nadeshiko's classmate.
Mirai Sōma (相馬 未来, Sōma Mirai)
Voiced by: Ayasa Itō
Hanako's classmate.
Kokoro Ogawa (小川 こころ, Ogawa Kokoro)
Voiced by: Reo Kurachi
Kokoro is one of Hanako's classmates
Misaki Takasaki (高崎 みさき, Takasaki Misaki)
Voiced by: Aoi Koga
Misaki is Hanako's classmates who sees her as a rival.
Shihoko Azuma (東 志帆子, Azuma Shihoko)
Voiced by: Chinami Hashimoto
Shihoko is an art teacher at Nanamori Middle School. As Nana Nishigaki's close friend, she has known Nana since high school and wishes to draw her.
Tsubasa Minamino (南野 つばさ, Minamino Tsubasa)
Voiced by: Yui Watanabe
Tsubasa is the P.E. teacher at Nanamori Middle School.

=== Majokko Mirakurun ===
Kurumi (胡桃) /Mirakurun (ミラクるん, Mirakurun)
Voiced by: Ayana Taketatsu
Kurumi is the heroine of the fictional magical girl series Majokko Mirakurun. When Kurumi transforms, she heavily resembles Chinatsu. Her magic wand turns into blunt weapons, with which Kurumi beats her enemies.
Raika (雷香) /Rivalun (ライバルん, Raibarun)
Voiced by: Aoi Yūki
Reika is another magical girl who competes with Mirakurun and is secretly Kurumi's classmate.
Ganbo (ガンボー, Ganbō)
Voiced by: Hikaru Midorikawa
Ganbo spherical robot wearing a pair of sunglasses. He is Rivalun's boss and the only character with a male voice.

== Books and publications ==
YuruYuri began its serial run in Ichijinsha's Japanese manga magazine, Comic Yuri Hime S, on June 18, 2008. In September 2010, YuruYuri was moved to Comic Yuri Hime when Comic Yuri Hime S ended its publication. The series went on an indefinite hiatus starting on July 18, 2018, but resumed publication in January 2019. As of December 2011, over a million copies of the manga had been sold. The manga was briefly released in English on the online reader site JManga before it shut down.

Another manga series set in the same universe, Reset! (りせっと!, Risetto!), began serialization in Caramel Febri magazine's first issue, released on July 24, 2010, and went on hiatus after the fourth issue, on January 25, 2011.

A spin-off web manga by Namori focusing on the Ohmuro sisters, titled Ōmuro-ke (大室家), has been released on Niconico's Niconico Seiga service. The series first released chapters alongside episodes of the second anime season between July 2 and September 17, 2012, before resuming on Ichijinsha's Niconico Yuri Hime web manga publication on February 17, 2013. An isekai spinoff manga series titled Tensei Shitara Akari dake Slime Datta Ken (転生したらあかりだけスライムだった件, Tensei Shitara Akari dake Suraimu Datta Ken; lit. 'That Time Only Akari Got Reincarnated as a Slime'), a parody of the That Time I Got Reincarnated as a Slime light novel, was teased as an April Fools' joke on April 1, 2020, before being officially announced on April 17, 2020. The series will be drawn by Naya Minadori and released on Kodansha's Suiyōbi no Sirius section of Niconico Seiga. A prequel spin-off by Namori centering around the teachers featured in the main series, titled Touzainanboku! (東西南北！, East, West, South, North!) began release on July 31, 2020.

=== Volume list ===
==== Original series ====
No.	Release date	ISBN	
No.	Release date	Normal edition	Limited edition
1	August 1, 2009	978-4-7580-7055-3	Not Applicable
2	February 1, 2010	978-4-7580-7070-6	Not Applicable
3	July 1, 2010	978-4-7580-7090-4	Not Applicable
4	February 1, 2011	978-4-7580-7120-8	978-4-7580-7121-5
5	June 1, 2011	978-4-7580-7147-5	Not Applicable
6	July 1, 2011	978-4-7580-7150-5	Not Applicable
7	August 5, 2011	978-4-7580-7145-1	978-4-7580-7146-8
8	August 5, 2012	978-4-7580-7200-7	978-4-7580-7201-4
9	August 5, 2012	978-4-7580-7203-8	978-4-7580-7204-5
10	June 5, 2013	978-4-7580-7251-9	978-4-7580-7252-6
11	February 1, 2014	978-4-7580-7290-8	978-4-7580-7291-5
12	August 4, 2014	978-4-7580-7326-4	978-4-7580-7327-1
13	February 4, 2015	978-4-7580-7390-5	978-4-7580-7391-2
14	January 18, 2016	978-4-7580-7520-6	978-4-7580-7521-3
15	May 31, 2017	978-4-7580-7674-6	978-4-7580-7675-3
16	January 30, 2018	978-4-7580-7775-0	978-4-7580-7776-7
17	August 29, 2019	978-4-7580-7974-7	978-4-7580-7975-4
18	May 27, 2020	978-4-7580-2114-2	978-4-7580-2115-9
19	January 5, 2021	978-4-7580-2197-5	978-4-7580-2198-2
20	August 31, 2021	978-4-7580-2286-6	978-4-7580-2287-3
21	December 27, 2021	978-4-7580-2340-5	978-4-7580-2341-2
22	December 26, 2022	978-4-7580-2481-5	978-4-7580-2482-2
23	December 24, 2024	978-4-7580-2819-6	978-4-7580-2820-2
24	October 30, 2025	978-4-7580-2982-7	978-4-7580-2983-4
25	October 28, 2026	978-4-8251-0175-3	978-4-8251-0176-0

==== Special edition ====
No.	Release date	ISBN
1	June 18, 2015	978-4-7580-7436-0
2	June 18, 2015	978-4-7580-7437-7
3	July 18, 2015	978-4-7580-7455-1
4	July 18, 2015	978-4-7580-7456-8
5	July 18, 2015	978-4-7580-7457-5
6	August 18, 2015	978-4-7580-7473-5
7	August 18, 2015	978-4-7580-7474-2
8	September 18, 2015	978-4-7580-7475-9
9	September 18, 2015	978-4-7580-7479-7
10	October 17, 2015	978-4-7580-7494-0
11	October 17, 2015	978-4-7580-7495-7
12	November 18, 2015	978-4-7580-7502-2
13	November 18, 2015	978-4-7580-7503-9

==== Ōmuro-ke ====
No.	Release date	ISBN	
No.	Release date	Normal edition	Limited edition
1	August 1, 2013	978-4-7580-7249-6	978-4-7580-7250-2
2	August 4, 2014	978-4-7580-7328-8	978-4-7580-7329-5
3	October 31, 2019	978-4-7580-7982-2	978-4-7580-7983-9
4	December 23, 2020	978-4-7580-2199-9	978-4-7580-2200-2
5	December 27, 2021	978-4-7580-2342-9	978-4-7580-2343-6
6	December 26, 2022	978-4-7580-2483-9	978-4-7580-2484-6
7	February 29, 2024	978-4-7580-2662-8	978-4-7580-2663-5
8	December 24, 2024	978-4-7580-2821-9	978-4-7580-2822-6
9	October 28, 2026	978-4-8251-0177-7	978-4-8251-0178-4

== Anime ==
An anime television adaptation of the manga series was announced in the May 2011 issue of Comic Yuri Hime. Animated by Doga Kobo and directed by Masahiko Ohta, the series aired in Japan on TV Tokyo between July 5 and September 20, 2011.

A second season, titled YuruYuri♪♪, aired in Japan between July 2, 2012, and September 17, 2012. Both series were simulcast by Crunchyroll. The series won the television award at the 17th Animation Kobe Awards. NIS America has licensed both seasons in North America, releasing the first two seasons on Blu-ray Disc on September 3, 2013, and January 7, 2014, respectively. Later, NIS America released it on Blu-ray and DVD on January 7, 2014.

An original video animation titled YuruYuri Nachuyachumi! (ゆるゆり なちゅやちゅみ！; YuruYuri Summer Vacation!) was screened in five theaters in Japan on November 29, 2014, before being released on Blu-ray and DVD on February 18, 2015. Unlike the series, the OVA is animated by TYO Animations instead of Doga Kobo, with Hiroyuki Hata replacing Ohta as director, Michiko Yokote replacing Takashi Aoshima as scriptwriter, and Motohiro Tanaguchi replacing character designer Chiaki Nakajima and serving as chief animation designer. Two additional episodes, titled Nachuyachumi!+, aired on August 21 and September 18, 2015.

A third anime season, titled YuruYuri San☆Hai!, also produced by TYO Animations, aired in Japan between October 6, 2015, and December 21, 2015. Like the previous two seasons, it was simulcast by Crunchyroll.

A new OVA, titled YuruYuri、 (pronounced "YuruYuri Ten"), was announced on April 22, 2018, to celebrate the manga's tenth anniversary. The OVA is animated by Lay-duce instead of TYO Animations, with Daigo Yamagishi as director, Takahiro as scriptwriter, and Kazutoshi Inoue serving as character designer and chief animation designer. The new OVA was crowdfunded and completed its goal in February 2019. It was released on November 13, 2019, and had its television premiere on AT-X on February 23, 2020

A four-episode original net animation series produced by DMM Futureworks and W-Toon Studio, titled MiniYuri, began streaming on Pony Canyon's YouTube channel on September 25, 2019. It is directed by Seiya Miyajima, with Takahiro as the scriptwriter, and Yasuhiro Misawa composing the music.

On August 4, 2023, it was announced that the Ōmuro-ke spin-off manga would be adapted into two anime films, titled Ōmuro-ke: Dear Sisters and Ōmuro-ke: Dear Friends. The films were produced by Passione and Studio Lings and directed by Naoyuki Tatsuwa, with scripts written by Masahiro Yokotani, character designs handled by Kazuyuki Ueda, and music composed by Yūsuke Shirato. The first film premiered on February 2, 2024, while the second film premiered on June 21, 2024.

=== Music ===
The main opening and ending themes are performed by the Nanamori Middle School Amusement Club (七森中☆ごらく部, Nanamori-chu Goraku-bu), a unit consisting of the four main voice actresses, Minami Tsuda, Rumi Ōkubo, Shiori Mikami and Yuka Ōtsubo. For the first season, the opening theme is "Yuriyurarararayuruyuri Daijiken" (ゆりゆららららゆるゆり大事件; lit. 'The Great YuriYurarararaYuruYuri Incident') while the ending theme is "My Pace de Ikimashō" (マイペースでいきましょう, Mai Pēsu de Ikimashō; Let's Go at My Pace). For the second season, the opening theme is "Yes! YuYuYu☆YuruYuri♪♪" (「いぇす！ゆゆゆ☆ゆるゆり♪♪, Iesu! YuYuYu☆YuruYuri♪♪) while the ending theme is "100% Chūgakusei" (100%ちゅ～学生; lit. '100% Middle School Student'). The opening theme for episode six is "Yonde Mirakurun!" (よんでミラクるん!, Call Me Mirakurun!) by Ayana Taketatsu while the ending theme for episode eight is "Girl's Power" (ガールズパワーで, Gāruzu Pawā de) by Minami Tsuda and Rumi Ōkubo. For the OVA, the opening and ending themes are "YuruYurinrinrinrinrin" (ゆるゆりんりんりんりんりん) and "After School Days" (アフタースクールデイズ, Afutā Sukūru Deizu), both performed by the Nanamori Middle School Amusement Club. For Nachuyachumi!+, the opening and ending themes are "YuriShuraShuShuShu" (ゆりしゅらしゅしゅしゅ) and "Ohirune Universe" (おひるねゆにばーす, Ohirune Yunibāsu; Naptime Universe). For San☆Hai, the main opening and ending themes are "Chochocho! YuruYuri☆Capriccio!!!" (ちょちょちょ!ゆるゆり☆かぷりっちょ!!!) and "Atchuma Seishun!" (あっちゅ〜ま青春！) by the Nanamori Middle School Amusement Club. The ending theme for episode 12 is "Kimi ga Kureta Shiny Story" (きみがくれたシャイニーストーリー, Kimi ga Kureta Shainī Sutōrī; lit. 'Shiny Story You Gave Me') by the Nanamori Middle School Amusement Club. For the 10th anniversary OVA, the opening and ending themes are "YuruYuri Tenya Wanya" (ゆるゆり、てんやわんや☆) and "Ribitte Chime" (リピってチャイム♪, Ribitte Chaimu♪), both performed by the Nanamori Middle School Amusement Club.

== Appearances in other media ==
Characters and songs from YuruYuri appeared alongside other anime characters in the rhythm game Miracle Girls Festival, which was developed by Sega for the PlayStation Vita and released on December 17, 2015. The series also had a collaboration with Release the Spyce: Secret Fragrance, a mobile game based on the anime series Release the Spyce that Namori had a hand in creating.
