= Doga Kobo =

Japanese animation studio

Doga Kobo Inc.

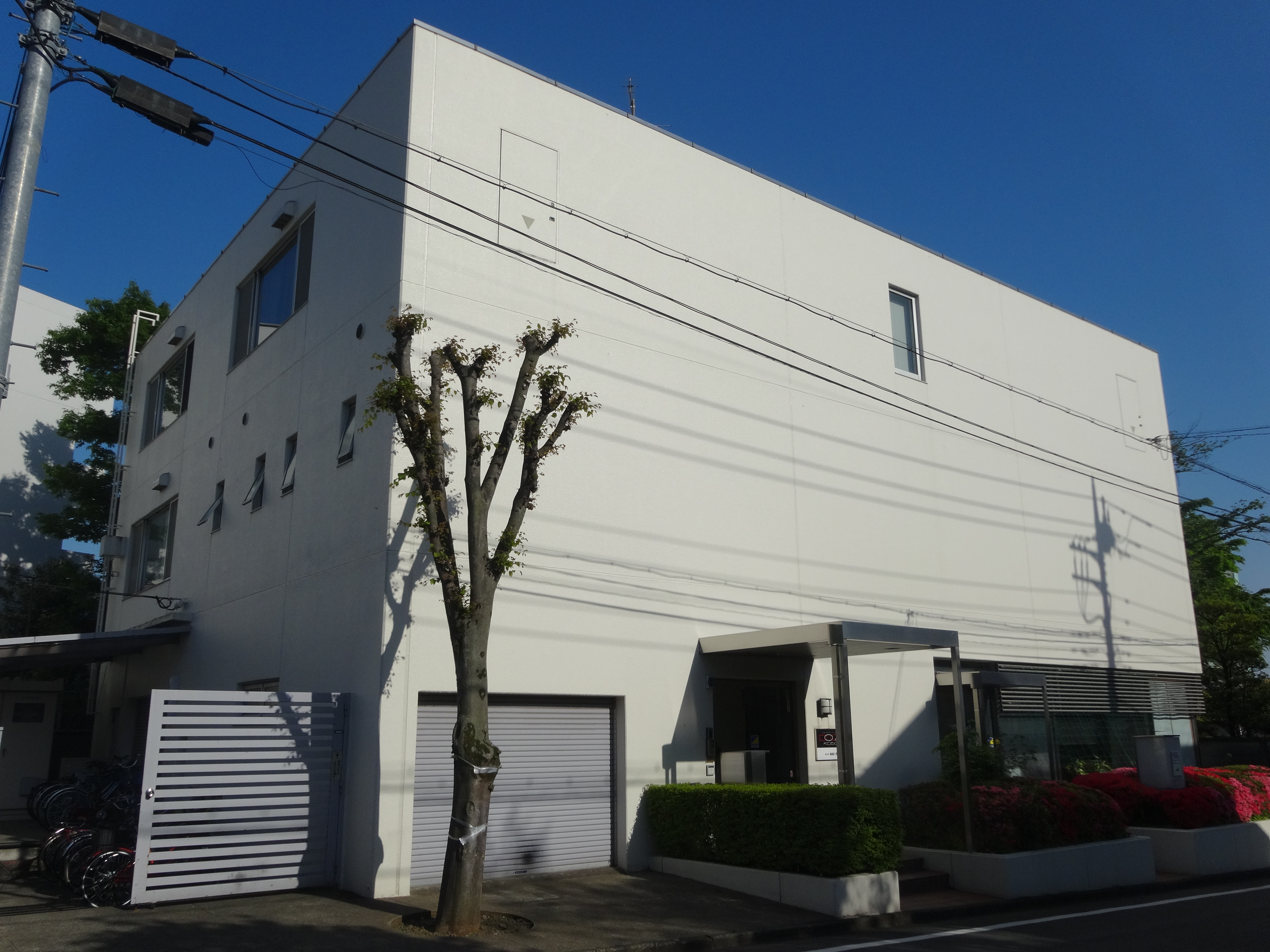
- Headquarters in Nerima, Tokyo
- Native name: 株式会社動画工房
- Type: Kabushiki gaisha
- Industry: Japanese animation
- Founded: July 11, 1973; 53 years ago
- Founder: Megumu Ishiguro
- Headquarters: Toyotamakita, Nerima, Tokyo, Japan
- Key people: Hajime Kamata (president)
- Number of employees: 62 (as of June 2024)
- Parent: Kadokawa Corporation
- Divisions: Photography Department (Note: Doga Kobo Photography department (動画工房撮影部), the studio's photography department.)
- Website: www.dogakobo.com

Doga Kobo, Inc. (Japanese: 株式会社動画工房, Hepburn: Kabushiki-gaisha Dōga Kōbō; literally "Video Workshop") is a Japanese animation studio formed by former Toei Animation members Hideo Furusawa and Megumu Ishiguro, located in Nerima, Tokyo, Japan. The studio was established on July 11, 1973, and is a subsidiary of Kadokawa Corporation.

Although the studio gained significant commercial success from their adaptations of yuri or yuri-ish anime like Koihime Musō and especially YuruYuri, the studio is also known for more traditional romantic shows such as Monthly Girls' Nozaki-kun, Plastic Memories, and Tada Never Falls in Love, and for slice of life comedy series such as Gabriel DropOut and Himouto! Umaru-chan.

In recent times the studio gained a wide popularity due to the anime adaptation of Oshi no Ko, a manga series written by Aka Akasaka and illustrated by Mengo Yokoyari.

In July 2024, Kadokawa announced that it had acquired Doga Kobo.

== Representative staff ==
=== Current ===
- Hajime Kamata (3rd CEO 2025~; board member ? (Note: Since at least 2014.)~2025)
- Kei Ishiguro (Board member)
- Shou Tanaka (Board member 2025~)
- Junichirou Tamura (Board member 2025~)
- Shuuzou Kasahara (Board member 2025~)
- Kunichiko Itou (Board member 2026~; executive officer 2025~2026)
- Hideaki Furusawa (Executive officer 2025~)

=== Former ===
- Megumu Ishiguro (1st CEO 1973~2006)
- Ryuu Ishiguro (2nd CEO 2006~2025)
- Tazuko Fukudo (Board member ?~2026)

== Productions ==
=== Television series ===
Year	Title	Director(s)	Animation producer(s)	Source	Eps.	Refs.
2007	Myself ; Yourself	Yasuhiro Kuroda; Tetsuaki Matsuda (chief episode director)	Hajime Kamata; Ryuu Ishiguro	Visual novel	13	
2008	Ryoko's Case File	Tarō Iwasaki	Tazuko Fukudo; Ryuu Ishiguro	Light novel	13	
2008	Koihime†Musō	Nobuaki Nakanishi	Hajime Kamata; Ryuu Ishiguro	Eroge visual novel	12	
2009	Shin Koihime†Musō	Nobuaki Nakanishi	Hajime Kamata; Ryuu Ishiguro	Eroge visual novel	12	
2009	11eyes	Masami Shimoda	Hajime Kamata; Ryuu Ishiguro	Visual novel	12	
2010	Shin Koihime†Musō: Otome Tairan	Nobuaki Nakanishi	Hajime Kamata; Ryuu Ishiguro	Eroge visual novel	12	
2011	A Bridge to the Starry Skies	Takenori Mihara	Hajime Kamata; Ryuu Ishiguro	Eroge visual novel	12	
2011	YuruYuri	Masahiko Ohta	Tazuko Fukudo	Manga	12	
2012	YuruYuri♪♪	Masahiko Ohta	Hajime Kamata	Manga	12	
2012	Natsuyuki Rendezvous	Kō Matsuo	Hajime Kamata	Manga	11	
2013	Mangirl!	Nobuaki Nakanishi	Hajime Kamata	Manga	13	
2013	GJ Club	Yoshiyuki Fujiwara	Hajime Kamata	Light novel	12	
2013	Majestic Prince (co-animated with Orange)	Keitaro Motonaga	Yousuke Nakamura	Manga	24	
2013	Love Lab	Masahiko Ohta	Producer: Hajime Kamata	Manga	13	
2013	Devils and Realist	Chiaki Kon	Yoshiya Asato	Manga	12	
2014	Engaged to the Unidentified	Yoshiyuki Fujiwara	Hajime Kamata	Manga	12	
2014	Monthly Girls' Nozaki-kun	Mitsue Yamazaki	Yousuke Nakamura	Manga	12	
2014	Laughing Under the Clouds	Hiroshi Haraguchi	Yousuke Nakamura	Manga	12	
2015	Plastic Memories	Yoshiyuki Fujiwara	Producer: Hajime Kamata	Original work	13	
2015	Mikagura School Suite	Tarō Iwasaki	Yousuke Nakamura	Light novel	12	
2015	Himouto! Umaru-chan	Masahiko Ohta	Hajime Kamata; Yousuke Nakamura	Manga	12	
2015	Aria the Scarlet Ammo AA	Takashi Kawabata	Yousuke Nakamura	Manga	12	
2016	Luck & Logic	Koichi Chigira	Kenichi Motohashi	Original work	12	
2016	Three Leaves, Three Colors	Yasuhiro Kimura	Shouta Umehara	Manga	12	
2016	New Game!	Yoshiyuki Fujiwara	Hajime Kamata	Manga	12	
2016	Touken Ranbu: Hanamaru	Takashi Naoya	Yousuke Nakamura	Online game	12	
2017	Gabriel DropOut	Masahiko Ohta	Kenichi Motohashi	Manga	12	
2017	Hina Logi ~from Luck & Logic~	Hiroaki Akagi	Kenichi Motohashi	Original work	12	
2017	New Game!!	Yoshiyuki Fujiwara	Hajime Kamata	Manga	12	
2017	Himouto! Umaru-chan R	Masahiko Ohta	Hajime Kamata	Manga	12	
2018	Zoku Touken Ranbu: Hanamaru	Tomoaki Koshida	Hajime Kamata	Video game	12	
2018	Tada Never Falls in Love	Mitsue Yamazaki	Hajime Kamata	Original work	13	
2018	Uchi no Maid ga Uzasugiru!	Masahiko Ohta	Hajime Kamata; Shingo Saitou	Manga	12	
2018	Anima Yell!	Masako Sato	Hajime Kamata	Manga	12	
2019	Wataten!: An Angel Flew Down to Me	Daisuke Hiramaki	Hajime Kamata	Manga	12	
2019	The Helpful Fox Senko-san	Tomoaki Koshida	Hajime Kamata; Taiki Sekine	Manga	12	
2019	How Heavy Are the Dumbbells You Lift?	Mitsue Yamazaki	Hajime Kamata; Shingo Saitou	Manga	12	
2020	Asteroid in Love	Daisuke Hiramaki	Ryou Kobayashi	Manga	12	
2020	Sing "Yesterday" for Me	Yoshiyuki Fujiwara	Hajime Kamata	Manga	12	
2020	Diary of Our Days at the Breakwater	Takaharu Okuma	Taiki Sekine	Manga	12	
2020	Sleepy Princess in the Demon Castle	Mitsue Yamazaki	Shingo Saitou	Manga	12	
2020	Ikebukuro West Gate Park	Tomoaki Koshida	Ryou Kobayashi; Shingo Saitou	Novel	12	
2021	Osamake	Takashi Naoya	Taiki Sekine	Light novel	12	
2021	Selection Project	Daisuke Hiramaki	Ryou Kobayashi	Multi-media project	13	
2021	My Senpai Is Annoying	Ryota Itoh	Ryou Kobayashi; Shingo Saitou	Manga	12	
2022	Chiikawa	Takenori Mihara	Hajime Kamata; Saori Wakabayashi	Manga	382	
2022	RPG Real Estate	Tomoaki Koshida	Yousuke Nakamura	Manga	12	
2022	Shikimori's Not Just a Cutie	Ryota Itoh	Ryou Kobayashi; Shingo Saitou	Manga	12	
2023	Technoroid Overmind	Ka Hee Im	Hajime Kamata; Shingo Saitou	Multi-media project	12	
2023	Oshi no Ko	Daisuke Hiramaki	Ryou Kobayashi	Manga	11	
2023	Saint Cecilia and Pastor Lawrence	Sumie Noro	Ryou Kobayashi	Manga	12	
2024	Jellyfish Can't Swim in the Night	Ryohei Takeshita	Shingo Saitou	Original work	12	
2024	Alya Sometimes Hides Her Feelings in Russian	Ryota Itoh	Ryou Kobayashi	Light novel	12	
2024	Oshi no Ko (season 2)	Daisuke Hiramaki	Ryou Kobayashi	Manga	13	
2025	The Shiunji Family Children	Ryouki Kamitsubo	Ryou Kobayashi	Manga	12	
2025	Let's Go Karaoke!	Asami Nakatani		Manga	5	
2025	Captivated, by You	Asami Nakatani		Manga	5	
2026	Oshi no Ko (season 3)	Daisuke Hiramaki	Ryou Kobayashi	Manga	11	
2026	Though I Am an Inept Villainess	Mitsue Yamazaki		Light novel	11	
2026	Mebius Dust	Tarō Iwasaki		Original work	12	
2027	Though I Am an Inept Villainess (season 2)	Mitsue Yamazaki		Light novel	TBA	
2027	Alya Sometimes Hides Her Feelings in Russian (season 2)	Hiroshi Haraguchi	Ryou Kobayashi	Light novel	TBA	
2027	The Skull Dragon's Precious Daughter	Kuniyasu Nishina	TBA	Manga	TBA	
2027	Oshi no Ko (season 4)	Daisuke Hiramaki	TBA	Manga	TBA	

=== OVA/Short series ===
Year	Title	Director(s)	Animation producer(s)	Source	Eps.	Refs.
1988	Space Family Carlvinson	Kimio Yabuki		Manga	1	
2005	Kahey no Umi	Hiroshi Hariguchi; Toshirou Kuni		Biography	1	
2006	Memories Off 5: Togireta Film	Tarou Iwasaki	Hajime Kamata; Tazuko Fukuchi	Visual novel	1	
2010	Shin Koihime†Musō LIVE Revolution	Nobuaki Nakanishi	Hajime Kamata; Ryuu Ishiguro	Eroge visual novel	1	
2010	11eyes	Masami Shimoda	Hajime Kamata; Ryuu Ishiguro	Eroge visual novel	1	
2011	A Bridge to the Starry Skies	Takenori Mihara	Hajime Kamata; Ryuu Ishiguro	Eroge visual novel	1	
2013	Lovely Movie: Lovely Muuuuuuuco!	Takenori Mihara		Manga	21	
2014	GJ Club@	Yoshiyuki Fujiwara	Hajime Kamata	Light novel	1	
2014	Lovely Movie: Lovely Muuuuuuuco! season 2	Takenori Mihara		Manga	22	
2014–2015	Monthly Girls' Nozaki-kun	Mitsue Yamazaki	Yousuke Nakamura	Manga	6	.
2015–2017	Himouto! Umaru-chan	Masahiko Ohta	Hajime Kamata; Yousuke Nakamura (1)	Manga	2	
2019	Uchi no Maid ga Uzasugiru!	Masahiko Ohta	Hajime Kamata; Shingo Saitou	Manga	1	
2019	Wataten!: An Angel Flew Down to Me	Daisuke Hiramaki	Hajime Kamata	Manga	1	

=== Films ===
Year	Title	Director(s)	Animation producer(s)	Source	Refs.
2017	Touken Ranbu: Hanamaru ~Makuai Kaisōroku~	Takashi Naoya		Video game	
2022	Toku Touken Ranbu: Hanamaru ~Setsugetsuka~ (3 films)	Takashi Naoya (1); Tomoaki Koshida (2); Sumie Noro (3)		Video game	
2022	Wataten!: An Angel Flew Down to Me: Precious Friends	Daisuke Hiramaki	Ryuu Kobayashi	Manga	

=== Others ===
Year	Title	Director(s)	Animation producer(s)	Source	Refs.
2023	"Idol" music video	Naoya Nakayama	Ryō Kobayashi	Song	

== Notable staff ==
=== Representative staff ===
- Megumu Ishiguro (founder, first president from 1973~2006)
- Ryuu Ishiguro (second president since 2006)
- Kei Ishiguro (director/board member)
- Tazuko Fukudo (director/board member)
- Hajime Kamata (director/board member)

=== Animation producers ===
- Kenichi Motohashi (2003~2017)
- Yousuke Nakamura (2007~present)
- Shouta Umemhara (2010~2016)
- Taiki Sekine (2010~present)
- Saori Wakabayashi (2010~present)
- Shingo Saitou (2013~present)
- Ryou Kobayashi (2016~present)

=== Production staff ===
- Satoko Sekine (2005~??, production assistant and scriptwriter)

=== Animators ===
- Akihiko Nishiyama (1983~1987)
- Katsuichi Nakayama (1983~??)
- Masafumi Satou (1985~??)
- Hiroyuki Kanbe (1988~??)
- Hisashi Mori (animator) (1989~??)
- Noboru Koizumi (1989~??)
- Susumu Mitsunaka (2001~??)
- Megumi Kagawa (??)
- Junichirou Taniguchi (??~present)
- Takenori Mihara (??~present)
