= GJ Club =

Japanese light novel series and its adaptations

- The first volume of GJ Club, published in Japan by Shogakukan on March 18, 2010 featuring five main characters.

GJ部 (Gujjobu)
- Genre: Comedy, slice of life
- Light novel
- Written by: Shin Araki
- Illustrated by: Aruya
- Published by: Shogakukan
- Imprint: Gagaga Bunko
- Original run: March 18, 2010 – March 16, 2012
- Volumes: 9 + 2 special volumes
- Light novel

GJ-bu Chūtō-bu
- Written by: Shin Araki
- Illustrated by: Aruya
- Published by: Shogakukan
- Imprint: Gagaga Bunko
- Original run: April 18, 2012 – January 17, 2014
- Volumes: 8
- Anime television series
- Directed by: Yoshiyuki Fujiwara
- Written by: Hideaki Koyasu
- Music by: Hajime Hyakkoku
- Studio: Doga Kobo
- Licensed by: NA: Crunchyroll
- Original network: NTV
- English network: SEA: Aniplus Asia
- Original run: January 10, 2013 – March 28, 2013
- Episodes: 12
- Original video animation

GJ Club@
- Directed by: Yoshiyuki Fujiwara
- Written by: Hideaki Koyasu
- Music by: Hajime Hyakkoku
- Studio: Doga Kobo
- Released: May 14, 2014
- Runtime: 46 minutes

GJ Club (GJ部, Gujjobu; lit. "Good Job Club") is a Japanese light novel series written by Shin Araki and illustrated by Aruya. An anime television series adaptation animated by Doga Kobo, aired between January 10 and March 28, 2013. A special 46-minute-long OVA was released on May 14, 2014.

== Plot ==
Shinomiya Kyōya is forced to become a new member of the GJ-bu (lit. GJ Club), an unidentified club that dwells in a room of the former building of a certain school. There he meets four girls: Mao, Megumi, Shion and Kirara. Time flies with these unique girls around. The series follows the everyday, though unusual, antics of this band of friends, where they all fall for him.

== Characters ==
=== GJ Club ===
Kyouya Shinomiya (四ノ宮 京夜, Shinomiya Kyōya)
Voiced by: Hiro Shimono
Nicknamed "Kyoro", Kyōya is the main protagonist of the series. He is the sole male member of GJ-bu, joining the club after being kidnapped by the others. He is a kind and courteous person who is the usual target of the other girls' teasing, frustration and, sometimes, their affection as well. Despite him being completely spineless in comparison to other males, Kyōya seems to have an innate talent in dealing with the opposing sex, like making them skip a beat when he temporarily assumes a more manly and less formal kind of speech or when carefully brushing their hair, a talent he claims he learned upon regularly combing his little sister's hair. He and Mao are almost always seen reading manga and light novels.

Mao Amatsuka (天使 真央, Amatsuka Mao)
Voiced by: Maaya Uchida
Mao is the older sister of Megumi and the club's president. She is a small girl who has orange hair and brown eyes. She has the habit of biting and picking on Kyōya when she is bored or angry. She can't stand kissing, to the point of carefully choosing shows to watch or books to read without kiss scenes at all and can barely tolerate the idea of a forehead or cheek kiss. She and Kyouya are almost always seen reading manga and light novels.

Megumi Amatsuka (天使 恵, Amatsuka Megumi)
Voiced by: Yume Miyamoto
Nicknamed "Megu", Megumi is the middle sister of the Amatsuka family. She is taller than Mao and has pink hair and eyes. She is a nice girl and is always seen making tea inside the club room. She likes to knit and is the one who knit together the club costumes. She always seems to have a calm demeanor even when everyone else in the club is scared. However, she seems to mind her weight, as whenever it is mentioned, she panics.

Shion Sumeragi (皇 紫音, Sumeragi Shion)
Voiced by: Suzuko Mimori
Nicknamed "Shī", Shion is a recognized genius chess player and has many brothers, all recognized as experts in some kind of activity. She has violet hair and eyes and has a low body temperature. As Shion is the sole daughter in her family, she likes to dote on younger girls acting as an older sister to them.

Kirara Bernstein (綺羅々・バーンシュタイン, Kirara Bānshutain)
Voiced by: Chika Arakawa
Kirara is the tallest and strongest member of the club with blue eyes and blonde hair shaped into cat ears. She is always seen eating meat of some sort and tends to be very possessive of it. The only person she will share her meat with is Kyōya. She can talk to cats and usually behaves like one. She has a huge fear of spiders due to being bitten by a venomous one when she was younger and has little tolerance to alcohol, as she once got drunk just by eating some whiskey chocolates. She is the older sister of Geraldine, and can speak English well.

Tamaki Kannazuki (神無月 環, Kannazuki Tamaki)
Voiced by: Sumire Uesaka
The newest member of GJ-bu. Just like Kyōya, she is invited to the club after being kidnapped by the others. She has several younger siblings. Tamaki is usually seen carrying a camera, which she can easily hide, and eating snacks, especially potato chips. Also, she is usually angering Megumi, as she always states that she won't get fat no matter how much she eats.

=== GJ Club Junior High School Division ===
Kasumi Shinomiya (四ノ宮 霞, Shinomiya Kasumi)
Voiced by: Ibuki Kido
Kasumi is Kyōya's younger sister. She is hinted to have a brother complex, where she hides all his novels, only leaving one because it has a little sister as the heroine. Mao, by making use of the fact that she looks younger than her, is able to hide the fact that she is the actual president of the GJ-bu from Kasumi. Kasumi is good friends with both Seira and Geraldine, and even creates her own GJ-bu, called Chūto-bu.

Seira Amatsuka (天使 聖羅, Amatsuka Seira)
Voiced by: Sumire Morohoshi
The youngest sister in the Amatsuka family. Usually dressed in a Goth-Lolita style, she has long black hair, red eyes and a cat clip on her head which she talks through using unknown means, presumed by Mao to be either ventriloquism or some manner of supernatural ability; with this, she usually states her true feelings to Kyōya. However, she always acts polite and cute when not using her cat clip. She is very fond of her sisters and looks grudgingly toward Kyōya when he gets too close to them.

Geraldine Bernstein (ジェラルディン・バーンシュタイン, Jerarudin Bānshutain)
Voiced by: Wakana Aoi
The younger sister of Kirara Bernstein. She came from Canada to visit her sister and views Kyōya as a Prince Charming since he helped her during their first meeting. She refers Kyōya as "Samurai Master". She has similar strength to her sister Kirara.

Kenta Shibui (渋井 健太, Shibui Kenta)
Unlike Kyōya, he talks in a pretty rude manner and is nicknamed "Kenken". He usually reads manga. He also has a frog he picked up somewhere named "Frog Kenta" (カエルの健太, Kaeru no Kenta) which is kept in the club room.

Jin Suoh (周防 仁, Suō Jin)
He appears to be cool and had excellent results in class. Nicknamed "Jinjin", his hobby is reading, and he usually reads light novel in the club room. Similar to Shion, he is also excellent at playing chess, and is called the second generation of the cute creature (which Shion had mentioned to her image in Episode 10).

Komori (小森)
Her face looks emotionless, and she is also a chamberlain from Amatsuka household. She has a strong relation to Mori, except her size. Like Megumi, she is the one who serves tea to the club members. Kasumi called her "Komorin" and Kenta called her "Tomochan".

=== Other characters ===
Mori (森さん, Mori-san)
Voiced by: Ayumi Tsunematsu
The Amatsuka family maid, who likes to ride motorcycles. A running gag is her twirling before Kyōya much to his pleasure and annoyance to the rest of the club members. She claims that the 1st "last boss" that Kyōya defeated with his hair brushing skill was her mother and not her, even though they looked identical with the same name.

Tesshin Yokomizo (横溝 徹心, Yokomizo Tesshin)
Kyōya's classmate, who has been friends with Kyōya since junior high school.

Takuma Shinjō (新城 拓真, Takuma Shinjō)
Kyōya's classmate, he is the childhood friend of the class' most beautiful girl Mina Kanzaki (神崎美奈, Kanzaki Mina). Mao called him as "Ultra Male" (超雄, Chōosu).

Nadeshiko Onigawara (鬼瓦 撫子, Onigawara Nadeshiko)
Kyōya's homeroom teacher, nicknamed "Nacchan".

"World Union Champion" (世界統一王者, Sekai tōitsu ōja)
Shion's chess partner that she considered as the world's best. He had promised a match with Shion since she was eight years old, and finally won by Shion. In volume 9, he came to Japan to a direct match with Shion.

Narumi Shinmeiji (新明路 鳴海, Shinmeiji Narumi)
Mao's classmate, who seat next to Mao. She sometimes seat under GJ Club's kotatsu.

Saeko Kotesashi (小手指 冴子, Kotesashi Saeko)
Kenta and Jun's classmate, known as the most beautiful one in their class. She once passed a love letter to Kenta but rejected, but she still want him.

Ichimonji (一文字先生, Ichimonji-sensei)
Kasumi's homeroom PE teacher.

Hotaru (蛍)
He usually represents the GJ club junior high division's members.

Rio Shinonome (東雲 理央)
Kasumi's classmate and nicknamed "Ricchan".

== Media ==
=== Light novels ===
The light novel series GJ-bu is written by Shin Araki and illustrated by Aruya. It is published by Shogakukan. The first volume was published on March 18, 2010 and the final, ninth - on March 16, 2012. On April 18, 2012, the first volume of the spin-off series GJ-bu Chūtō-bu (GJ部中等部; lit. "Good Job Club, Junior High School Division") was published. As of January 17, 2014, there have been eight volumes published A special volume, titled GJ-bu Hanamaru (GJ部◎) was published on March 19, 2013, and another, titled GJ-bu Lost Time (ＧＪ部ロスタイム) was released on April 18, 2014.

==== List of GJ-bu volumes ====
No.	Title	Release date	ISBN
1	GJ-bu (GJ部)	March 18, 2010	978-4-09-451192-5
2	GJ-bu (2) (GJ部 (2))	June 18, 2010	978-4-09-451210-6
3	GJ-bu (3) (GJ部 (3))	September 17, 2010	978-4-09-451229-8
4	GJ-bu (4) (GJ部 (4))	December 17, 2010	978-4-09-451243-4
5	GJ-bu (5) (GJ部 (5))	March 18, 2011	978-4-09-451261-8
6	GJ-bu (6) (GJ部 (6))	June 17, 2011	978-4-09-451278-6
7	GJ-bu (7) (GJ部 (7))	September 17, 2011	978-4-09-451297-7
8	GJ-bu (8) (GJ部 (8))	December 17, 2011	978-4-09-451310-3
9	GJ-bu (9) (GJ部 (9))	March 16, 2012	978-4-09-451292-2
	GJ-bu Hanamaru (GJ部◎)	March 19, 2013	978-4-09-451399-8
	GJ-bu Lost Time (ＧＪ部ロスタイム)	April 18, 2014	978-4-09-451478-0

==== List of GJ-bu Chūtō-bu volumes ====
No.	Title	Release date	ISBN
1	GJ-bu Chūtō-bu (1) (GJ部中等部 (1))	April 18, 2012	978-4-09-451336-3
2	GJ-bu Chūtō-bu (2) (GJ部中等部 (2))	July 18, 2012	978-4-09-451351-6
3	GJ-bu Chūtō-bu (3) (GJ部中等部 (3))	October 18, 2012	978-4-09-451370-7
4	GJ-bu Chūtō-bu (4) (GJ部中等部 (4))	January 18, 2013	978-4-09-451388-2
5	GJ-bu Chūtō-bu (5) (GJ部中等部 (5))	April 18, 2013	978-4-09-451405-6
6	GJ-bu Chūtō-bu (6) (GJ部中等部 (6))	July 18, 2013	978-4-09-451425-4
7	GJ-bu Chūtō-bu (7) (GJ部中等部 (7))	October 18, 2013	978-4-09-451444-5
8	GJ-bu Chūtō-bu (8) (GJ部中等部 (8))	January 17, 2014	978-4-09-451461-2

=== Anime ===
The anime aired between January 10 and March 28, 2013. It has been licensed for streaming by Crunchyroll. The opening theme song is "Mōsō★Kōkan Nikki" (もうそう★こうかんにっき; Delusion★Exchange Diary) by Otome Shintō with Tamaki added in the opening animation on Episode 7 onwards, there are four ending themes including:

"I wish ~Tokimeki no Mahō~" (I wish 〜ときめきの魔法〜, I wish ~The Fluttering Magic~) by Mao Amatsuka and Megumi Amatsuka (Episode 1-2).
"balance unbalance ~Honto no Watashi~" (balance unbalance 〜ホント ノ ワタシ〜, balance unbalance ~The Real Me~) by Shion Sumeragi (Episode 3-4).
"Purely Sky ~Watashi Dake no Sora~" (Purely Sky 〜私だけの空〜, Purely Sky ~Just My Sky~) by Kirara Bernstein (Episode 5-6).
"Hashiri Dasō!" (走りだそう!; I'll Just Run!) by Mao Amatsuka, Megumi Amatsuka, Shion Sumeragi, and Kirara Bernstein (Episode 7-12.

The insert song for Episode 12 is "GRADUATION COLOR" by Mao Amatsuka. The first, second, and third ending are featured in the first OST "G", and Hashiri Dasō! with GRADUATION COLOR are featured in the second OST "J".

A DVD and Blu-ray version of the series was released on March 19, 2014. A special OVA, titled GJ Club@ (GJ部＠, Gujjobu Guruguru), will be released on DVD and Blu-ray Disc on May 14, 2014. The special is 46 minutes long and its story is set after graduation, when the GJ club visits New York for their spring vacation.

==== Episode list ====
No.	Title	Original air date
1	"I am the GJ Club!"; Transliteration: "Watashi ga Gujjobu da!" (Japanese: 私がグッジョブだ！)	January 10, 2013
Mao is trying to reach a burnt out light bulb, when Kyōya offers to help he winds up getting bitten. Megumi and Kyōya talk about Shoujo manga and it comes out that Mao can't read them. Shion plays against the world champion in chess online, who she easily beats. Due to a prank by Mao, Kyōya accidentally breaks a tea cup. Megumi proposes a punishment game for him and the other girls want to join in. Mao proposes a nickname for Kyōya, and she and the rest of the girls decide upon "Kyoro".
2	"Friendship, Love, Her Abnormality?"; Transliteration: "Yūjō, Aijō, Kanojo no Ijō?" (Japanese: 友情・愛情・彼女の異常？)	January 17, 2013
Shion, never having had canned coffee before, finds it weird. Mao has the habit of talking in her sleep when she has a bad dream, causing Shion to test a theory. Megumi tutors Kyōya in how to brush hair using Mao as a test subject. Shion reads a romance novel causing her to ask Kyōya a question. Mao challenge Kyōya to an arm wrestling contest where he has to beat all the girls for a prize. As a result he gets knocked out by Kirara and she receives the prize.
3	"Kyoro on the GJ String"; Transliteration: "GJ Senjō no Kyoro" (Japanese: GJ線上のキョロ)	January 24, 2013
Kyōya calls Shion a genius and gets lectured on why she doesn't like being called one. Mao plays a prank on Kyōya which he falls into. On a later date, Mao plays the same prank on Kyōya, which he falls into again causing him to sulk, making the girls feel bad. Kyōya sees Kirara talking with a cat. Mao finds an old TV that when booted up was playing a Tigers game which is Kirara's favorite team.
4	"After School's Cultural Festival Party"; Transliteration: "Hōkago Bunkasai Pātī" (Japanese: 放課後文化祭パーティー)	January 31, 2013
A marriage ceremony is performed. A sweet potato vendor comes around, and the girls fight over the last one. The GJ Club discuss what they will do for the culture festival. Megumi, Mao, and Shion decide to dress up to tease Kyōya. Mori, the Amatsuka family maid, brings something Megumi forgot. Kirara and Kyōya dance, and Kyōya says something that embarrasses her.
5	"Double Fantasy"; Transliteration: "Daburu na Fantajī" (Japanese: ダブルなファンタジー)	February 7, 2013
Kyōya brushes Shion's hair. Kyōya tries to talk in a more manly fashion. Mao knits a big stocking for Santa. There isn't enough room under the kotatsu for everyone. Kyōya gets depressed when he doesn't receive any Valentine's Day chocolate only for Mori to show up and give him some.
6	"Four Little Sisters Enter!?"; Transliteration: "Imōto ga Yonin Hairu!?" (Japanese: 妹が4人入る!?)	February 14, 2013
Two sisters named Mao and Megumi appear in this episode.
7	"A New Club Member Appears!"; Transliteration: "Shinnyū Buin Arawaru!" (Japanese: 新入部員あらわる！)	February 21, 2013
A new staff member comes in.
8	"Sisters Attack!" (Japanese: シスターズ・アタック！)	February 28, 2013
In early summer, Kao's younger sister Kasumi comes to the club room to play. Mao, who thinks Kasumi is younger, spends her time as Ma-chan. In addition, they are going to go to the pool in every part of GJ part because a hot day continues. It comes to Kasumi and his friends. The name of Kasumi's friend seems to have been heard somewhere.
9	"Kyoro, Borderline GJ: Rebirth"; Transliteration: "GJ Senjō no Kyoro: Ribāsu" (Japanese: GJ線上のキョロ・REBIRTH)	March 7, 2013
GJ club members appearing as patients before Kyōya comes after them.
10	"An Autumn of Art, Appetites, and Attacks"; Transliteration: "Geijutsu to Shokuyoku to Shūgeki no Aki" (Japanese: 芸術と食欲と襲撃の秋)	March 14, 2013
While Tamaki naps in a cardboard box, the other girls look through Kyōya's sketchbook, in which Mao is characterized as a monster, Shion as just a head with little common sense, Megumi as a fairy that is depressed about her weight, and Kirara as a tiger who is weak to being smelled. Kyōya then gets punished by each of the girls for his drawings. After Shion gets her first taste of fast food, Megumi challenges Tamaki to eat only cake for a week; in the end, Tamaki loses weight instead of gaining, which saddens Megumi. Later, Kasumi, Geraldine, and Seira (all in Halloween costumes, despite it not being Halloween yet) arrive as the Chūto-bu.
11	"Canceled Agreements"; Transliteration: "Kyōtei Kaijo" (Japanese: 協・定・解・除)	March 21, 2013
It seems that the agreement will be canceled this year, but will they be able to get chocolate from Kyōya?
12	"Our Farewells to the GJ Club"; Transliteration: "Saraba Gujjobu to Iou" (Japanese: さらばGJ部と言おう)	March 28, 2013
It's graduation time for Mao, Kirara and Shion. Kyōya spends some time alone with Kirara and Shion; Mao is too embarrassed to be alone with Kyōya. Afterwards, Kyōya, Tamaki and Megumi throw their own graduation ceremony.
OVA	"GJ Club@"; Transliteration: "Gujjobu Guruguru" (Japanese: GJ部＠)	May 14, 2014
Kyōya is abducted by the GJ members to a replica of their old clubroom in New York City under the pretense that Mao, Kirara and Shion are yet to have their graduation trip, but they spend most of the time hanging out indoors as usual. Back in Japan, Kyōya meets Mao after the pair spend several months apart and the other girls come with a plan to have them get on terms again.

== See also ==
- Classroom for Heroes - Another light novel series by the same author
