= Masahiko Ohta =

Japanese animator, storyboard artist, & director

- 太田雅彦
- Born: January 4, 1967 (age 59); Hiroshima, Japan
- Occupations: Anime animator, storyboard artist, animation director
- Years active: 2000–present
- Notable work: Himouto! Umaru-chan

Masahiko Ohta (Japanese: 太田雅彦, Hepburn: Ōta Masahiko) (born January 4, 1967) is a Japanese animator, storyboard artist, and animation director.

== Biography ==
He worked on "Bit the Cupid" and "Hare Tokidoki Buta" at Group TAC before leaving the company in 1998 to start his own business. He has worked in animation and direction since about 2000, primarily for Madhouse productions (MADHOUSE Inc.). In 2003's "Narutaru," he worked as a character designer. In 2006's "Yoake Mae yori Ruriiro na: Crescent Love" he made his directorial debut. He has since transitioned to directing, concentrating on Dome and Doga Kobo's anime. Since appointing Takashi Aoshima as his first director in 2006, he has also employed Takaharu Okuma as an assistant director or character designer and Yasuhiro Misawa as the composer for all of his productions.

== Works ==
=== Animator ===
- Tatchi: Sebangô no nai êsu (1986)
- Tatchi 2: Sayonara no Okurimono (1986)
- Tatchi 3: Kimi ga tôrisugita ato ni (1987)
- Murasaki Shikibu: Genji Monogatori (1987)
- Fushigi no umi no Nadia: Gekijô-yô orijinaru-ban (1991)
- Licca-chan to Yamaneko Hoshi no Tabi (1994)
- Tenchi Muyô! Manatsu no Eve (1997)
- Superman: The Animated Series (1998)
- Tatchi: Are kara kimi wa … Miss Lonely Yesterday (1998)
- Grandeek - Gaiden (2000)
- Touch: Cross Road (2001)
- X (2001)
- Strawberry Marshmallow (2005)
- Rosario + Vampire (2008)
- Mitsudomoe (2010)
- Sabagebu! (2014)

=== Director ===
- Yoake Mae yori Ruriiro na: Crescent Love (2006)
- Minami-ke (2007)
- Mitsudomoe (2010)
- YuruYuri (2011)
- YuruYuri♪♪ (2012)
- Kotoura-san (2013)
- Love Lab (2013)
- Sabagebu! (2014)
- Himouto! Umaru-chan (2015)
- Hagane Orchestra (2016)
- Gabriel DropOut (2017)
- Himouto! Umaru-chan R (2017)
- Uchi no Maid ga Uzasugiru! (2018)
- Didn't I Say to Make My Abilities Average in the Next Life?! (2019)
- Onipan! (2022)
- My Deer Friend Nokotan (2024)
- The Daughter of the Demon Lord Is Too Kind! (2026)

=== Storyboard artist ===
- Mai-HiMe (2004)
- Elemental gelade (2005)
- Shuffle! (2005)
- Minami-ke (2007)
- Toraburu (2008)
- Mitsudomoe (2010)
- Kotoura-san (2013)
- Love Lab (2013)
- Sabagebu! (2014)
- Himouto! Umaruchan (2015)
- Gabriel DropOut (2017)
- Uchi no Maid ga Uzasugiru (2018)
- My Deer Friend Nokotan (2024)
