= List of The Dangers in My Heart chapters =

The Dangers in My Heart is a Japanese manga series written and illustrated by Norio Sakurai. It follows Kyotaro Ichikawa, a shy middle school boy who initially fantasizes about killing his popular classmate, Anna Yamada, but over time begins to fall in love as he gets to know more about her.

The series started serialization in Akita Shoten's Weekly Shōnen Champion magazine on March 8, 2018. On April 10, 2018, the series was transferred to the Champion Cross manga website. On July 10, 2018, Akita Shoten merged Champion Cross with Champion Tap! to form their newly created manga website, Manga Cross. When the websites merged, the manga was transferred to Manga Cross, which was re-launched as Champion Cross in April 2024. The series ended serialization on September 15, 2026 and its chapters were collected in 14 tankōbon volumes.

In December 2020, Seven Seas Entertainment announced they licensed the series for English publication. The series is also licensed by Tong Li Publishing in Taiwan. Individual chapters of the series are called kartes.

A spin-off manga written and illustrated by Haika Nanasaka, titled The Dangers in My Heart: The Romantic Comedy Won't Start, began serialization on the same website on July 22, 2025. The chapters have been collected into two tankōbon volumes as of November 2026. In May 2026, Seven Seas Entertainment announced that they had also licensed the spin-off for English publication in January 2027.

== Volumes ==
No.	Original release date	Original ISBN	English release date	English ISBN
1	December 7, 2018	978-4-25-322615-8	July 20, 2021	978-1-64-827425-1
1. "I Was Robbed" (僕は奪われた, Boku wa Ubawareta); 2. "I Got Angry" (僕は憤怒した, Boku wa Funnu Shita); 3. "I Set Things Up" (僕はお膳立てした, Boku wa Ozendate Shita); 4. "I Handed It to Her" (僕は渡した, Boku wa Watashita); 5. "I Ran Into Her" (僕は遭遇した, Boku wa Sōgū Shita); 6. "I Hate It" (僕は嫌だ, Boku wa Iya Da); 7. "I Kneaded and Kneaded" (僕は練りに練った, Boku wa Neri ni Netta); 8. "I Got Heated" (僕は沸騰した, Boku wa Futtō Shita); 9. "I Sheltered Her" (僕は匿った, Boku wa Kakumatta); 10. "I Died" (僕は死んだ, Boku wa Shinda); 11. "I Broke Through" (僕は突破した, Boku wa Toppa Shita); 12. "I Couldn't Sleep" (僕は眠れない, Boku wa Nemurenai); 13. "I Was Productive" (僕は捗った, Boku wa Hakadotta); 14. "I Couldn't Do Anything" (僕は何もできない, Boku wa Nanimo Dekinai); 15. "I Wanted to Hold Her" (僕は抱きしめたい, Boku wa Dakishimetai); Extra: "The Waterside Distance" (水辺の距離, Mizube no Kyori)
2	September 6, 2019	978-4-25-322616-5	September 21, 2021	978-1-64-827443-5
16. "I Have a Mental Illness" (僕は心の病, Boku wa Kokoro no Yamai); 17. "I Yielded" (僕は譲った, Boku wa Yuzutta); 18. "I Heartily Participated" (僕は奮って参加した, Boku wa Furutte Sanka Shita); 19. "I Ran Into Her Again" (僕は再び遭遇した, Boku wa Futatabi Sōgū Shita); 20. "I Defended Her" (僕は弁護した, Boku wa Bengo Shita); 21. "I Left Things Alone" (僕はそっとしておいた, Boku wa Sotto Shite Oita); 22. "I Got Drenched" (僕はずぶ濡れた, Boku wa Zubu Nureta); 23. "I Heard Some Gossip" (僕は恋バナを聞いた, Boku wa Koibana o Kiita); 24. "I Won't Get Picked" (僕は選ばれない, Boku wa Erabarenai); 25. "I Pretended to be Calm" (僕は平静を装った, Boku wa Heisei o Yosōtta); 26. "I Sealed It Away" (僕は封じた, Boku wa Fūjita); 27. "We Got Separated" (僕らははぐれた, Bokura wa Hagureta); 28. "I'm Enjoying School" (僕は学校が楽しい, Boku wa Gakkō ga Tanoshii); 29. "The Line Separating My 'Like'" (僕の「好き」の境目, Boku no "Suki" no Sakaime); 30. "I Melted It" (僕は溶かした, Boku wa Tokashita); Extra1: "Chocolate and Mint" (チョコとミント, Choko to Minto); Extra2: "Permeating Feelings" (染みこむ気持ち, Shimikomu Kimochi)
3	June 8, 2020	978-4-25-322617-2; 978-4-25-322618-9 (SE)	November 16, 2021	978-1-64-827462-6
31. "I Use LINE" (僕はLINEをやっている, Boku wa Rain o Yatteiru); 32. "I Can't Keep My Distance" (僕は距離をとれない, Boku wa Kyori o Torenai); 33. "We Swapped Places" (僕は入れ替わってる, Boku wa Irekawatteru); 34. "I Tuned In" (僕は視聴した, Boku wa Shichō Shita); 35. "I Did Some Tutoring" (僕は勉強を教える, Boku wa Benkyō o Oshieru); 36. "I Am Not Like My Mother" (僕は母親と似ていない, Boku wa Hahaoya to Niteinai); 37. "I Attempted to Make Contact" (僕は接触を試みた, Boku wa Sesshoku o Kokoromita); 38. "I Was Really Drenched" (僕はホントにずぶ濡れた, Boku wa Honto ni Zubu Nureta); 39. "I Had a Dream" (僕は夢を見た, Boku wa Yume o Mita); 40. "I Became Her Practice Partner" (僕は練習台になった, Boku wa Renshūdai ni Natta); 41. "I Can't See" (僕は見えない, Boku wa Mienai); 42. "I Was Used" (僕は利用された, Boku wa Riyō Sareta); 43. "I Hate Yamada" (僕は山田が嫌い, Boku wa Yamada ga Kirai); 44. "We Use LINE" (僕らはLINEをやっている, Bokura wa Rain o Yatteiru); Extra1: "Dark Mage" (闇の能力者, Yami no Nōryokusha); Extra2: "I Had My Height Measured" (身長測ってもらった, Shinchō Hakattemoratta); Extra3: "Strawberries and Bavarois" (イチゴとババロア, Ichigo to Babaroa)
4	February 8, 2021	978-4-25-322619-6; 978-4-25-322620-2 (SE)	April 26, 2022	978-1-63-858171-0
45. "I Had a Meetup" (僕は待ち合わせをした, Boku wa Machiawase o Shita); 46. "I Was Taken Away" (僕は連行された, Boku wa Renkō Sareta); 47. "I Couldn't Say 'Cute'" (僕は可愛いが言えない, Boku wa Kawaii ga Ienai); 48. "We Walked Slowly" (僕らはゆっくり歩いた, Bokura wa Yukkuri Aruita); 49. "I Felt Uneasy" (僕はモヤモヤする, Boku wa Moyamoya Suru); 50. "I Felt Elated" (僕は高揚している, Boku wa Kōyō Shiteiru); 51. "It Was Difficult For Me" (僕には難しい, Boku niwa Muzukashii); 52. "We Are Slightly Similar" (僕らは少し似ている, Bokura wa Sukoshi Niteiru); 53. "I Wanted To Hear Her Voice" (僕は声が聞きたい, Boku wa Koe ga Kikitai); 54. "I Went To the Shrine" (僕は参拝した, Boku wa Sanpai Shita); 55. "A Revealing Visit" (僕は開示された, Boku wa Kaiji Sareta); 56. "I Was Investigated" (僕は探られた, Boku wa Sagurareta); 57. "I Wanted Her To Know Me" (僕は僕を知ってほしい, Boku wa Boku o Shittehoshii); Extra: "My Tale of Times Past (僕の今昔物語, Boku no Konjaku Monogatari)
5	July 8, 2021	978-4-25-322667-7; 978-4-25-322666-0 (SE)	December 6, 2022	978-1-63858-723-1
58. "I Want To Rely On Her" (僕は頼りたい, Boku wa Tayoritai); 59. "I Gave It Away" (僕はバラしてしまった, Boku wa Barashiteshimatta); 60. "I Was Having Fun, Though" (僕は楽しいのに, Boku wa Tanoshii noni); 61. "We're Looking" (僕らは探している, Bokura wa Sagashiteiru); 62. "I Took a Bath" (僕はお風呂をいただいた, Boku wa Ofuro o Itadaita); 63. "I Accepted It" (僕は受け止めた, Boku wa Uketometa); 64. "We Aren't Grown-ups" (僕らは大人じゃない, Bokura wa Otona Janai); 65. "I'm Growing Up" (僕は大人のなりかけ, Boku wa Otona no Narinake); 66. "I Was Thrown" (僕は投げられた, Boku wa Nagerareta); 67. "I Can't Look Right At Her" (僕は直視できない, Boku wa Chokushi Dekinai); 68. "I Was Invited" (僕は誘われた, Boku wa Sasowareta); 69. "I Want to Believe" (僕は信じてみたい, Boku wa Shinjitemitai); 70. "I Tasted It" (僕は試食した, Boku wa Shishoku Shita); 71. "Yamada and Me" (僕は山田と, Boku wa Yamada to); Extra: "The Fate of the Jersey" (ジャージの行方, Jāji no Yukue)
6	January 7, 2022	978-4-25-322669-1; 978-4-25-322668-4 (SE)	July 18, 2023	978-1-68579-618-1
72. "I Got Chocolate" (僕はチョコをもらった, Boku wa Chokko o Moratta); 73. "I Gave Chocolate" (僕はチョコをあげた, Boku wa Chokko o Ageta); 74. "Yamada Likes..." (山田は僕を, Yamada wa Boku o); 75. "How Do I Live?" (僕はどう生きるか, Boku wa Dō Ikiru ka); 76. "I Invited Her After School" (僕は放課後誘った, Boku wa Hōkago Sasotta); 77. "I Paid a Surprise Visit" (僕は突撃訪問した, Boku wa Totsugeki Hōmon Shita); 78. "I Want to Know" (僕は知りたい, Boku wa Shiritai); 79. "I'm In Study Mode" (僕は学びモード, Boku wa Manabi Mōdo); 80. "I'm Playing House" (僕はおままごと, Boku wa Omamagoto); 81. "I Dropped By" (僕はお邪魔した, Boku wa Ojama Shita); 82. "I'm Rehearsing" (僕はリハーサル中, Boku wa Rihāsaru-chū); 83. "I'm Ready" (僕は準備万端, Boku wa Junbibantan); 84. "I'm Okay" (僕は大丈夫, Boku wa Daijōbu); 85. "Yamada Likes Me" (山田は僕が好き, Yamada wa Boku ga Suki)
7	August 8, 2022	978-4-253-22684-4; 978-4-253-22670-7 (SE)	October 3, 2023	978-1-68579-619-8
86. "I Am Creepy" (僕はキモい, Boku wa Kimoi); 87. "I Am Going On a Double Date" (僕はダブルデートする, Boku wa Daburudēto Suru); 88. "What Am I Even Saying" (僕は何を言っているのか, Boku wa Nani o Itteiru no ka); 89. "I Am Overflowing" (僕は溢れ出る, Boku wa Afurederu); 90. "I Am Complicated" (僕はややこしい, Boku wa Yayakoshii); 91. "We Made a Goal" (僕らはゴールした, Bokura wa Gōru Shita); 92. "I Was Born" (僕は生まれた, Boku wa Umareta); 93. "I'm a Star Today" (僕は本日の主役, Boku wa Honjitsu no Shuyaku); 94. "We Stayed Up Late" (僕らは夜更かしした, Bokura wa Yofukashi Shita); 95. "We Reflected" (僕らは反省した, Bokura wa Hansei Shita); 96. "I Feel Guilty" (僕は後ろめたい, Boku wa Ushirometai); 97. "I Am Just Worried" (僕はただ心配, Boku wa Tada Shinpai); 98. "We Expressed Ourselves" (僕らは表明した, Bokura wa Hyōmei Shita); 99. "We Made a Promise" (僕らは約束した, Bokura wa Yakusoku Shita); Extra: "Last Night's Anguish" (前夜の懊悩, Zen'ya no Ōnō)
8	March 8, 2023	978-4-253-22685-1; 978-4-253-22967-8 (SE)	April 23, 2024	979-8-88843-387-4
100. "My Dear, Small World" (僕の愛しき狭い世界, Boku no Itoshiki Semai Sekai); 101. "I Want to Get Closer to Yamada" (僕は山田に近づきたい, Boku wa Yamada ni Chikazukitai); 102. "I Am a Stranger" (僕は他人, Boku wa Tanin); 103. "I Reminisced" (僕は回想した, Boku wa Kaisō Shita); 104. "I Like Her More" (僕の方が好きだ, Boku no Hō ga Suki da); 105. "I Don't Want to Lose" (僕は負けたくない, Boku wa Maketakunai); 106. "We Are Losing" (僕らは負けている, Bokura wa Maketeiru); 107. "I Am Looking Forward to It" (僕は楽しみ, Boku wa Tanoshimi); 108. "I Didn't Notice" (僕は気が付かない, Boku wa Ki ga Tsukanai); 109. "I Noticed" (僕は気が付いた, Boku wa Ki ga Tsuita); 110. "I Want to Tell Her" (僕は伝えたい, Boku wa Tsutaetai); 111. "My Love" (僕の恋心, Boku no Koigokoro); 112. "I Want to Tell Him" (私は伝えたい, Watashi wa Tsutaetai); 113. "My Love" (私の恋心, Watashi no Koigokoro); Extra1: "The Time Adachi-kun Helped Fill in the Gaps" (足立くんが補足してくれる回, Adachi-kun ga Hosoku Shite Kureru Kai); Extra2: "The Time I Showed Off My Treasures to the World" (宝物を世界に見せびらかす回, Takaramono o Sekai ni Misebirakasu Kai)
9	November 8, 2023	978-4-253-22969-2; 978-4-253-22968-5 (SE)	October 22, 2024	979-8-89160-505-3
114. "We're Going Out" (僕らは付き合っている, Bokura wa Tsukiatteiru); 115. "I Want to Confess" (僕は打ち明けたい, Boku wa Uchiaketai); 116. "I Ask for Permission" (僕は許しを乞う, Boku wa Yurushi o Kou); 117. "I Wanted to Move Forward as Well" (僕も前に進みたい, Boku mo Mae ni Susumitai); 118. "I Had Built a Wall" (僕は壁を作っていた, Boku wa Kabe o Tsukutteita); 119. "We Went to a Concert" (僕らはライブに行った, Bokura wa Raibu ni Itta); 120. "We Are Drunk" (僕らは酔っている, Bokura wa Yotteiru); 121. "I'm Lacking Awareness" (僕は自覚が足りない, Boku wa Jikaku ga Tarinai); 122. "I'm Lacking Resolve" (僕は覚悟が足りない, Boku wa Kakugo ga Tarinai); 123. "I Want to Know" (僕は聞きたい, Boku wa Kikitai); 124. "I'm Currently Studying" (僕は勉強中, Boku wa Benkyō-chū); 125. "We Do Some Babysitting" (僕らは育児する, Bokura wa Ikuji Suru); 126. "I'm Venting" (僕は弱音を吐く, Boku wa Yowane o Haku); 127. "We Go On" (僕らは続く, Bokura wa Tsuzuku); 128. "I'm Done For" (僕はもうおしまい, Boku wa mō Oshimai)
10	April 8, 2024	978-4-253-28476-9; 978-4-253-22970-8 (SE)	February 25, 2025	979-8-89373-171-2
129. "I Went to Camp" (僕は合宿に来た, Boku wa Gasshuku ni Kita); 130. "I Went to the Ocean" (僕は海に来た, Boku wa Umi ni Kita); 131. "I Didn't Bring It" (僕は持ってきてない, Boku wa Mottekitenai); 132. "Our Night Wears On" (僕らの夜は更けていく, Bokura no Yoru wa Fuketeiku); 133. "I Am Caught in the Middle" (僕は板挟み, Boku wa Itabasami); 134. "I Get Pissed Off Too" (僕もムカつく, Boku mo Mukatsuku); 135. "I Focused" (僕は集中した, Boku wa Shūchū Shita); 136. "I Remembered Something Important" (僕は大切なことを思い出した, Boku wa Taisetsu na Koto o Omoidashita); 137. "We Are Free" (僕らは自由だ, Bokura wa Jiyū da); 138. "I Am Adrift" (僕は漂流する, Boku wa Hyōryū Suru); 139. "We Wander Around" (僕らは彷徨う, Bokura wa Samayou); 140. "We Are Not Good People" (僕らはよくない人間たち, Bokura wa Yokunai Ningen-tachi)
11	November 8, 2024	978-4-253-28477-6; 978-4-253-28478-3 (SE)	August 5, 2025	979-8-89373-963-3
141. "I Come In Between" (僕は間に入る, Boku wa Aida ni Hairu); 142. "I Am Full of Distractions" (僕は雑念だらけ, Boku wa Zatsunen-darake); 143. "I Let My Guard Down" (僕は油断している, Boku wa Yudan Shiteiru); 144. "We Told a Lie" (僕らはウソをついた, Bokura wa Uso o Tsuita); 145. "I Am a Rejected Man" (僕はフラれた男, Boku wa Furareta Otoko); 146. "I Am Not Feeling Festive Right Now" (僕は祭りどころじゃない, Boku wa Matsuri Dokoro Janai); 147. "We Were Seen Right Through" (僕らはバレていた, Bokura wa Barete ita); 148. "We Appreciate the Fireworks" (僕らは花火を知る, Bokura wa Hanabi o Shiru); 149. "I Want to Speak Seriously" (僕は真面目に語りたい, Boku wa Majime ni Kataritai); 150. "I Attend a Cultural Festival" (僕は文化祭へ行く, Boku wa Bunkamatsuri e iku); 151. "I Didn't Give Up" (僕は諦めなかった, Boku wa Akiramenakatta); 152. "I Became the Director" (僕は監督になった, Boku wa Kantoku ni Natta); 153. "We Built Something Up" (僕らは創り上げた, Bokura wa Tsukuri Ageta); 154. "I Will Find You No Matter Where You Are" (僕はどこにいても君を見つける, Boku wa Dokoni ite mo Kimi o Mitsukeru)
12	June 6, 2025	978-4-253-28480-6; 978-4-253-28479-0 (SE)	February 24, 2026	979-8-89561-720-5
155. "I Pretend to Be Understanding" (私は物分かりのいい, Watashi wa Mono Wakari no ii); 156. "I Am Honest" (私は本音を言う, Watashi wa Hon'ne o iu); 157. "What Am I Doing?" (私はなにをしているのか, Watashi wa Nani o Shite Iru no ka); 158. "I Came Home in the Morning" (僕は朝帰りした, Boku wa Asagaeri Shita); 159. "I Am Lonely" (私は寂しい, Watashi wa Sabishī); 160. "I Want to Be Encouraged" (私は背中を押されたい, Watashi wa Senaka o Osa Retai); 161. "We Cannot Sleep" (私たちは眠れない, Watashitachi wa Nemurenai); 162. "I Speak" (僕は語ってしまう, Boku wa Katatte Shimau); 163. "I Want to Find My Path" (僕は道を見つけたい, Boku wa Michi o Mitsuketai); 164. "I Take Action" (僕は動き出す, Boku wa Ugokidasu); 165. "I Want to Settle Things Amicably" (僕は丸く収めたい, Boku wa Maruku Osametai); 166. "I Don't Need Anything" (私はなにもいらない, Watashi wa Nani mo Iranai); 167. "We Are Still Unable to Say Anything" (僕らはなにも言えぬ, Bokura wa Nani mo Ienu); 168. "I Will Find You No Matter Where You Are" (私はどこにいても君をみつける, Watashi wa Dokoni Ite mo Kimi o Mitsukeru)
13	January 8, 2026	978-4-253-00884-6; 978-4-253-00885-3 (SE)	August 25, 2026	979-8-89863-243-4
169. "I Do a Homestay" (僕はホームステイする, Boku wa Hōmusutei suru); 170. "We Greet the Morning" (僕らは朝を迎える, Bokura wa Asa o Mukaeru); 171. "I Pretend to Be an Adult" (僕は大人のふりをする, Boku wa Otona no Furi o Suru); 172. "We Are Toyed With" (私たちは振り回され, Watashitachi wa Furimawasare); 173. "I Was Lured" (私は誘われた, Watashi wa Sasowareta); 174. "How Will We Pass the Year" (僕らはどう年を越すか, Bokura wa dō Toshi o Kosu ka); 175. "I Made a Vow" (僕は誓った, Boku wa Chikatta); 176. "I Won't Make the Same Mistake Again" (僕は同じ轍を踏まない, Boku wa Onaji Wadachi o Fumanai); 177. "I Want to Remember" (僕は残したい, Boku wa Nokoshitai); 178. "I Can Endure It" (私は我慢できる, Watashi wa Gaman Dekiru); 179. "I Want to Be Supportive" (は後押ししたい, Boku wa Atooshi Shitai); 180. "I Keep Piling Up" (私は積もり積もる, Watashi wa Tsumori Tsumoru); 181. "I'm a Piece of Trash" (僕はくそゴミ, Boku wa Kuso Gomi); 182. "We Become Dear to One Another Again" (らはまた愛おしくなる, Bokura wa Mata Itooshiku Naru)
14	November 6, 2026	978-4-253-01923-1; 978-4-253-01924-8 (SE)	TBD	—
183. Boku wa Sentō Kaishi (僕は戦闘開始); 184. Boku wa Haremono (僕は腫れ物); 185. Boku wa Sasae Rarete Iru (僕は支えられている); 186. Watashi no Dekiru Koto (私のできること); 187. Boku wa Kessen Zen'ya (僕は決戦前夜); 188. Bokura wa Itsumo Issho da (僕らはいつも一緒だ); 189. Boku wa Hitori Janai (僕はひとりじゃない); 190. Boku wa Happyō Suru (僕は発表する); 191. Watashitachi wa Iwau (私たちは祝う); 192. Bokura wa Shinro ga Kimaranai (僕らは進路が決まらない); 193. Boku wa Itsumo Hagureru (僕はいつもはぐれる); 194. Bokura wa Yarakashi Tsudzukeru (僕らはやらかし続ける); 195. Bokura wa Mawari Tsudzukeru (僕らは回り続ける); 196. Bokura wa Zutto Soba ni Iru (僕らはずっとそばにいる); 197. Watashi wa Yatteyaru (私はやってやる); 198. Bokutachi wa Tabidachi no Hi ni (僕たちは旅立ちの日に); 199. Boku no Kokoro no Yabai Yatsu (僕の心のヤバイやつ)

== The Romantic Comedy Won't Start ==
No.	Original release date	Original ISBN	English release date	English ISBN
1	January 8, 2026	978-4-253-00889-1	January 26, 2027	979-8-90209-339-8
1. Ichikawa Kana to Jin Sōta (市川香菜と陣宗太); 2. Senpai to Kōhai (先輩と後輩); 3. Kōda Niko no Kyōshū (香田ニコの郷愁); 4. Ichikawa Kana to Momoyama Akira ① (市川香菜と桃山晶①); 5. Ichikawa Kana to Momoyama Akira ② (市川香菜と桃山晶②); 6. Futari no Hajimete ① (2人の初めて①); 7. Futari no Hajimete ② (2人の初めて②); 8. Tomodachi Da Kara (友達だから); 9. Kasa no Shita no Hanbun ni (傘の下の半分に)
2	November 6, 2026	978-4-253-02055-8	TBD	—
10. Manga Kasu Dake① (漫画貸すだけ①); 11. Manga Kasu Dake② (漫画貸すだけ②); 12. Shūkatsu to Takopa (就活とタコパ); 13. Ichikawa Kana no Yūutsu (市川香菜の憂鬱); 14. Jin Kyōdai (陣姉弟); 15. "Tsuzuku" (『つづく』); 16. Onē to Onē-san (おねえとお姉さん); 17. Uchiage to Shin Membā (打ち上げと新メンバー); 18. Ore Wa Tsuriaitai① (俺は釣り合いたい①); 19. Ore Wa Tsuriaitai② (俺は釣り合いたい②)
3	January 7, 2027	978-4-253-02188-3	TBD	—

=== Chapters not yet in tankōbon format ===
These chapters have yet to be published in a tankōbon volume.

20. Ore wa Iwaitai (俺は祝いたい)
21. Futari wa Koida (2人は漕いだ)
22. Ichikawa Kana no Moya Moya (市川香菜のモヤモヤ)
23. Jin-kun Chi e Omimai (陣くんちへお見舞い)
24. Hajimete no Gōkon (初めての合コン)
25. Yamada Futatabi (山田再び)
26. Jin Sōta to Ichikawa Kyōtarō (陣宗太と市川京太郎)
27. Niko-chan to Shoppingu (ニコちゃんとショッピング)
28. Futari no Kurisumasu① (2人のクリスマス①)
29. Futari no Kurisumasu② (2人のクリスマス②)

== See also ==
- List of The Dangers in My Heart episodes
