= List of The Dangers in My Heart episodes =

The Dangers in My Heart is an anime television series based on the manga series of the same name written and illustrated by Norio Sakurai. The series is produced by Shin-Ei Animation and directed by Hiroaki Akagi, with scripts written by Jukki Hanada, character designs handled by Masato Katsumata, and music composed by Kensuke Ushio.

== Background ==
The story follows the perspective of Kyotaro Ichikawa; a 13-year-old, introverted Chūnibyō middle school student attending Daijuni Middle School. Reading murder-related novels by himself, he fantasizes about murdering his classmates, in particular, Anna Yamada; a pretty, tall, and cheerful young model who spends time secretly eating snacks in the school library. Where Ichikawa also goes to read books in private. Despite his false murderous prospects, Ichikawa finds himself helping Yamada in secret and eventually realizes that he has a crush on her. After several encounters with each other, Ichikawa and Yamada steadily become closer, becoming friends harboring romantic feelings for each other.

The first season aired from April 2 to June 18, 2023, on the NUMAnimation programming block on TV Asahi and its affiliates. The opening theme is "Shayō" (斜陽; "Setting Sun") by Yorushika, while the ending theme is "Sū Sentimental" (数センチメンタル; "A few Sentimental") by Kohana Lam.

On December 10, 2023, an animated collection of shorts based on the bonus chapters posted on the author's Twitter account titled "Twi-Yaba" was released in a standalone episode with the official English title of "Bonus Dangers". The shorts within the special last a few minutes each. Each short contains either a standalone gag, view into their daily lives, or a holiday special.

External videos
- The opening animation of the second season directed by Tetsurō Araki, featuring Atarayo's "Boku wa..."

A second season was announced after the airing of the twelfth episode. It premiered on January 7, 2024, on the same programming block. The opening theme is "Boku wa..." (僕は...; "I Am...") by Atarayo, while the ending theme is "Koi Shiteru Jibun Sura Aiserunda" (恋してる自分すら愛せるんだ; "I Can Even Love My Loving Self") by Kohana Lam. The opening animation is storyboarded and directed by Tetsurō Araki, who is known for directing the anime series Attack on Titan, and produced with the assistance from Wit Studio. (Note: Information is taken from the ending credits of each episode.)

The series is licensed by Sentai Filmworks and is streaming on Hidive. While Plus Media Networks Asia licensed the anime in Southeast Asia which premiered on Aniplus Asia.

== Series overview ==
Season	Episodes	Originally released	
Season	Episodes	First released	Last released
1	12	April 2, 2023	June 18, 2023
2	13	January 7, 2024	March 31, 2024
3	TBA	April 2027	TBA

== Episodes ==
=== Season 1 (2023) ===
No. overall	No. in season	Title (Note: All English titles are taken from HIDIVE.)	Directed by	Storyboarded by	Original release date
1	1	"I Was Stolen Away"; Transliteration: "Boku wa Ubawareta" (Japanese: 僕は奪われた)	Hiroki Imamura	Hiroki Imamura	April 2, 2023
Kyotaro is a troubled student who fantasizes about murdering his classmates, in particular magazine model and classmate Anna, even carrying a box-cutter for that purpose. By chance, he and Anna are alone in the library where he notices the odd behavior she exhibits, including humming like a monkey. Seeing she needs scissors for her schoolwork, he impulsively lends her his box-cutter, leaving him without his weapon. He finds the box-cutter in his desk later, surprising him that she knew which desk was his. He begins to notice more odd behavior, which somehow tempts him to secretly offer help. They accidentally interrupt a love confession between Hara and Kanzaki, and Kyotaro is forced by Anna to make cat noises to conceal their eavesdropping. Kyotaro is baffled by his continuing to help her. Later, he spots Anna in a shop blatantly trying to get noticed as the model on the magazines, embarrassing him on her behalf. He impulsively buys the magazine and later uses it to masturbate. The next day, he spots an upperclassman named Haruya harassing Anna for her Line and impulsively speeds his bike into the river as a distraction. Anna correctly deduces he did it to help, and laughs when he says that he "hit the gas and not the brakes".
2	2	"I Died"; Transliteration: "Boku wa Shinda" (Japanese: 僕は死んだ)	Dali Chen	Yoshiyuki Shirahata	April 9, 2023
Anna brings a snack to school that must be mixed with water, which she spills repeatedly. Kyotaro is compelled to fetch a glass but finds her using a bowl, increasing his urge to kill her. On a hot day, Anna starts sweating so Adachi tries to peek at her bra, but Kyotaro sabotages him. In the library, Kyotaro sees she is wearing a swimsuit instead of a bra. Chihiro appears so Anna hides under the desk, giving him an erection. Chihiro ends up revealing she is allergic to snack food so Anna always snacks alone. The class does a haunted house for Culture Festival and Anna notices her name on a tombstone. Kyotaro takes the blame to spare the real culprit, Hara, but Hara reveals she had innocently used everyone’s names, not just Anna. Anna realizes Kyotaro took the blame trying to spare Hara. Kyotaro notices Haruya approach Anna again, but is relieved when the other girls protect Anna this time. He and Anna end up alone by a display of town maps, revealing their homes are only one kilometer apart. Anna takes a selfie on Kyotaro’s phone, which he decides to keep.
3	3	"I Want to Hug You"; Transliteration: "Boku wa Dakishimetai" (Japanese: 僕は抱きしめたい)	Yoshiyuki Shirahata	Hiroaki Yoshikawa	April 16, 2023
Kyotaro begins writing a dark fantasy manga. Kyotaro goes to the infirmary with headache and finds Anna there with stomach-ache (actually period pains). He wonders if he should kill her but she shares her own medicine with him, then leaves. The nurse notices the shirt Anna left behind on him and asks him to return it, the smell of which arouses him. Adachi ask Kyotaro to pass Anna a lewd note. Kyotaro instead passes the drawing of his manga heroine, which resembles her. The same boys attempt a trick that supposedly reveals the girls' favorite sex position, but the girls expose them before Anna falls for it. Anna unwittingly performs the trick on Kyotaro that suggests girl-on-top position, giving him another erection. Kyotaro cannot reconcile his hatred with his sexual attraction so when Anna injures her nose in basketball, he follows her to the infirmary determined to kill her. When he hears Anna crying over her nose ruining an important photoshoot, and sees she has carefully kept his drawing, he realizes he loves her. As her nose hurts continuously, Kyotaro leaves tissues as an anonymous gift. He is rather disappointed she uses them to clean snack crumbs and yet happy to see her smile again.
4	4	"I Have a Problem"; Transliteration: "Boku wa Kokoro no Yamai" (Japanese: 僕は心の病)	Bak Gyeong-sun	Bak Gyeong-sun	April 23, 2023
Kyotaro decides love is a mental illness. When Anna brings a milk based snack to the library he insists she use a bowl, but they are caught by a teacher, causing the snack to spill all over Anna. They both get scolded by the teacher. Kyotaro notices the spilled snack looks lewd. Kyotaro notices Kanaoya wants to talk to Anna so he leaves them alone in the library. Kanaoya apologizes for hurting Anna’s nose. Serina, hiding outside, notices what Kyotaro did and thanks him. Kyotaro ends up taking Anna home on his bike. While drinking, Anna gives Kyotaro the bottle lid. After getting home, she gives him a bottle of his own in gratitude. Kyotaro self-consciously gives her his lid, making her laugh. Anna and Kyotaro coincidentally end up at the same restaurant while he is with his doting older sister and she with her friends. They each try to eavesdrop on the other, Anna finding out the girl he's with is his sister but Kyotaro unable to hear details when the girls talk about how often Anna is flirted with, as she loudly shakes her snacks. She meets him at the counter, saying she is cheerfully envious since she is an only child. Kyotaro realizes Anna came over just to talk to him, despite her claims otherwise. He buys the ice cream she wants, intending to give it to her, but chickens out when she jokes that he's copying her order. Anna gets in trouble for snacking in the library until Kyotaro points out the lack of evidence. The teacher is so happy to see Kyotaro interacting with people he forgets to scold Anna. Grateful, Anna announces that he should start calling her "Yamada", without the honorific suffix -san.
5	5	"We Got Split Up"; Transliteration: "Bokura wa Hagureta" (Japanese: 僕らははぐれた)	Takuma Suzuki	Hitoyuki Matsui	April 30, 2023
The class gets to go on job experience. Kyotaro and the pervert-boys all want to be in Anna’s group. Kyotaro gets into Anna’s group by manipulating Kanzaki into Hara’s group, whom Kanzaki is dating. Anna notices and praises Kyotaro’s good deed. Anna and Hara discuss dating, revealing Anna has never dated. Hara is amused Anna spends so much time with Kyotaro. During the rain Anna has no umbrella so she borrows Kyotaro’s raincoat to go buy one. Kyotaro notices she forgot her bag and rushes it to her, becoming soaked, only to find she had an umbrella all along. Anna claims it is broken but while he is waiting he sees it works fine. Anna and Kyotaro talk about whether they love or hate certain snacks. As he leaves, Anna loudly calls out she's in love, Kyotaro hastily clarifies to those around that she's talking about chocolate. Anna, her friends, Kyotaro and Adachi visit a manga publisher. Kyotaro tries not to show Anna his otaku side but she notices and convinces him to enjoy himself. While in a cramped elevator, Anna and Kyotaro are pressed together. He struggles not to become aroused, then surprisingly notices Anna is as flustered as he is. Anna later tries to talk about manga and offers to loan him volumes of hers, but when Chii laughs at the thought of him enjoying shoujo manga, Kyotaro angrily convinces himself that they're mocking him. As Kyotaro goes to the bathroom, Anna waits for him, but forgets to tell the others. They realize they've been left behind and run for the train, but end up missing it, leaving Anna and Kyotaro at the station.
6	6	"I Melted It"; Transliteration: "Boku wa Tokashita" (Japanese: 僕は溶かした)	Akihito Sudō	Akihito Sudō	May 7, 2023
Anna blames herself for missing the train. Feeling guilty, Kyotaro buys her a drink and then takes the blame himself, making her smile. On the next train, Anna cryptically asks Kyotaro if two classmates dating would be better to announce it or keep it secret. The next morning, Kana notices Kyotaro is actually enjoying school. Kyotaro is surprised to see Anna waiting outside school for someone. She follows to give him the manga series she had promised to lend him, though awkwardly goes back when he points out she was waiting for someone. In the library, Anna insists he read the manga. She leaves early but the two agree to meet the next afternoon as normal. Adachi notices Kyotaro talking with Anna and asks him about Anna’s love life, saying he thinks he loves her because of how sexy she is. Kyotaro is more disgusted by Adachi than usual because there is more to liking Anna than her looks. Realizing this, he once again wonders if he loves her. The no-eating rule is finally signposted in the library so Kyotaro worries Anna will stop visiting. Anna keeps snacking anyway but when a teacher almost catches her, Kyotaro grabs her hand to hide the evidence. Anna tells him to leave (to lick the melted chocolate in her hands) and he tells her she should lay off the snacks. He wonders if he has ruined everything, but they meet at the library the next day as usual.
7	7	"We Swapped Places"; Transliteration: "Bokura wa Irekawatteru" (Japanese: 僕らは入れ替わってる)	Tarō Kubo	Hiroaki Yoshikawa	May 14, 2023
Kyotaro learns Anna is on a weekly TV programme. During running class, Anna matches speeds with him to talk. She even asks for his help standing up, touching hands on purpose. Kyotaro and Anna accidentally switch jackets so they secretly trade back in the infirmary. Anna secretly smells his jacket before returning it. She abruptly suggests measuring their heights for fun, and she accidentally steps on a weight scale. Kyotaro simply cannot understand her behavior. News spreads that Anna will be in a movie. Class seating is rearranged and Anna is seated in front of Kyotaro. Anna gets jealous about Kyotaro borrowing notes from Hara, not knowing he couldn't see the class board from behind Anna. Kyotaro tells her that she is the only one he sees, which Anna seriously misinterprets. Hara arranges to switch seats, putting Anna behind Kyotaro. In the library he asks about the movie and learns it is a smaller role than their classmates assumed. She asks to practice her one line with him, though as it involves calling him a creep, and they go into a cramped cupboard for privacy. Anna claims that the movie will premiere two years now, at which point they will have graduated. He promises to watch the movie, so she leaves, unable to call him a creep anymore. Kyotaro watches her TV series and again finds it is a much smaller role than he assumed. For some reason he is relieved she still has a long way to go before becoming a celebrity.
8	8	"I Had a Dream"; Transliteration: "Boku wa Yume o Mita" (Japanese: 僕は夢を見た)	Dali Chen	Ryūhei Aoyagi	May 21, 2023
Chii joins Anna in the library, revealing to Kyotaro that Anna talks about him constantly, embarrassing her. Chii is surprised Kyotaro now not only talks normally, he even smiles. Parent-teacher conferences arrive and Kyotaro his mother next to Anna and her mom, who he sees as overbearing. Kyotaro is mortified Anna overhears him agreeing with his mother Anna is beautiful. Anna starts getting even closer to him during library time. Anna is almost caught with sweets again, but when Kyotaro whispers a warning in her ear, she becomes so flustered she falls off her chair. After briefly meeting Anna in the rain Kyotaro bikes home, only to embarrassingly find Anna left a bag with tampons in his basket, so he races back to her, only to find they apparently were for Anna’s mother. After having a strange dream about Anna, Kyotaro finds he has caught a cold from the rain. Anna visits after school to bring him ice-cream, which leads to him impulsively inviting her for tea. Embarrassed by Anna in his home, Kyotaro passes out while he's changing clothes in his room. Anna helps him but can’t resist hugging him in his delirium. Kyotaro wakes up in different clothes, later unsure whether he dreamt what happened until his sister gives him a get-better note left by Anna. His mother confirms Anna visited and was worried about him. Returning to school, Kyotaro sees Anna has a mild cold, but doesn’t realize she caught it from their hug.
9	9	"I Hate Yamada"; Transliteration: "Boku wa Yamada ga Kirai" (Japanese: 僕は山田が嫌い)	Bak Gyeong-sun	Yoshiyuki Shirahata	May 28, 2023
Anna tries to get Kyotaro’s Line, but he is oblivious in part because she isn't direct. Anna decides to get it when Moeko suggests a group chat for their class, but Moeko intercepts her and gets his Line first, infuriating her. The situation eventually makes Kyotaro realize she was asking for his Line the whole time. Haruya asks Chii out to get closer to Anna, but Anna can’t bring herself to upset Chii by telling her she is being used as bait. Two girls ask Anna about boyfriends, but when Anna firmly denies having one, they realize she is saying it for Kyotaro’s benefit, and leaves them alone. When Haruya arrives, Anna fakes a kiss with Kyotaro, so he leaves and Moeko ends up telling Chii the truth about being used as bait, leading her not to hang out with Haruya. Kyotaro angrily convinces himself Anna has been using him to deter Haruya since they met, so he ignores her for the next two days. Upset, Anna confronts him and asks if he is mad at her and starts crying. Seeing Anna using the tissues he left for her, Kyotaro realizes Anna isn’t cruel enough to use people. When he apologizes, she impulsively hugs him, and this time he lets her. They end up talking their whole walk home and since it is winter break the next day, Anna asks him to meet out of school, she directly asks for his Line and they end up texting all night.
10	10	"We Walked Slowly"; Transliteration: "Bokura wa Yukkuri Aruita" (Japanese: 僕らはゆっくり歩いた)	Ryō Ōkubo; Yōhei Fukui	Hiroki Imamura	June 4, 2023
Both Kyotaro and Anna arrive to their meeting on Christmas Eve early, and he realizes Anna dressed up while he looks like a stalker. Anna takes him for pancakes, causing him to feel he is on a first date. Kyotaro is embarrassed when he realizes he can’t afford anything except coffee and feels increasingly embarrassed to look Anna in the face. While clothes shopping Anna asks him to pick outfits for her, flustering him when he hears her undressing behind the curtain. Kana appears shopping and Anna, realizing Kyotaro doesn’t want Kana to see them, pulls him into the changing room with her. Due to their proximity, Anna is able to make Kyotaro promise to introduce her to his sister soon. Kyotaro is shocked to see her bra under her unzipped dress, which she decides to buy. Kyotaro is able to tell her he is having fun, so she reveals a scarf she bought him. To not be separated on the crowded train, Kyotaro grabs Anna's hand and they just keep holding hands for the entire journey plus their walk home, unsure of when to let go until then. Kyotaro is surprised Anna hopes to see him again before New Year’s Eve and he starts to wonder if she's aware that he likes her.
11	11	"We're a Bit Alike"; Transliteration: "Bokura wa Sukoshi Niteiru" (Japanese: 僕らは少し似ている)	Shige Fukase	Juria Matsumura	June 11, 2023
Four days before New Year, Kyotaro and his family travel to visit his grandmother. While taking a photo of snow for Anna, he falls and breaks his arm, so they decide to return home early in the morning. As he texts Anna about his broken arm, he gets a secret video from her, which is noticed by Kana. He is surprised when Kana doesn’t tease him, then more surprised when Anna calls back immediately just to say goodnight. Kana asks to meet Anna sometime. Kyotaro meets Anna walking her dog and considers giving her a souvenir dog keychain he bought for her but decides against it. While playing with her dog, Anna holds his hand again. She confesses that she wanted to give him her muffler as a gift, so he gives her the keychain, surprising him at how happy she becomes. She arranges to see him during New Year shrine visits. Kyotaro randomly encounters several classmates on New Years night, including Anna’s friend Moeko, and Haruya who pressures Kyotaro for Anna’s Line. To protect Anna, Kyotaro refuses. Impressed, Moeko gets him to leave with her and teases Kyotaro into admitting he loves Anna, though she also points out it has been obvious for some time, embarrassing him. Upon realizing that he confessed out loud, Kyotaro calls Anna at midnight to just hear her voice and wish her a happy New Year. He decides he will have to tell Anna how he feels very soon.
12	12	"I Wanted to Be Seen"; Transliteration: "Boku wa Boku o Shitte Hoshii" (Japanese: 僕は僕を知ってほしい)	Yasushi Tomoda	Hiroaki Yoshikawa	June 18, 2023
Due to Anna arriving early, Kyotaro ends up meeting her at the shrine with Kana and his parents. Kana points out to Kyotaro that Anna is clearly dressed for a date, before realizing it was him she had come to meet. As his arm is broken, Kyotaro cannot clap during prayers so Anna helps using her own hand, flustering him. Kana invites Anna to their house to see Kyotaro’s childhood photo’s and Anna notices he had two friends, though Kyotaro bitterly reveals they left to attend different private middle schools. Kana leaves them alone but thanks Anna for being Kyotaro’s friend. Anna insists on looking at more photos but he panics when she finds a magazine of her pictures and as he jumps to hide it ends up fully on top of her. They are both embarrassed, but Anna isn’t upset and instead takes copies of his photos, promising he can see her photos next time. Kyotaro is confused as it sounded like she wants him to visit her house. Flashbacks show Kyotaro lost his friends because his tests scores were not high enough for him to attend the same school. Seeing Anna at school the next day he is compelled to tell her she is why he could enjoy going to school again. Anna insists it was ultimately his own efforts and changes that made school better for him, causing him pause. She hugs him and he hugs her back. Moeko spots them being awkward afterwards and mistakenly assumes they have “done it.”

=== Season 2 (2024) ===
No. overall	No. in season	Title	Directed by	Storyboarded by	Original release date
13	1	"We're Searching"; Transliteration: "Bokura wa Sagashite Iru" (Japanese: 僕らは探している)	Yoshiyuki Shirahata	Ryūhei Aoyagi	January 7, 2024
Kyotaro is back in class with Yamada, his arm is broken which impedes his day to day school tasks. His homeroom teacher recommends that he ask someone close to him in class to assist. However, when the teacher points out Yamada could help, he quickly denies that they are friends out of embarrassment. Yamada is standing right next to the door, and Kyotaro quickly realizes she overheard what he said, leaving her greatly upset and avoiding him for a while. After some time passes, Kyotaro gathers up the courage and tells Yamada that he is sorry for what he said to the teacher and that he did not mean it. He tells her he just did not want to put the burden of helping him on her, but she says that it's fine and that she wants to help him. They make up afterwards and Kyotaro agrees to rely on Yamada for assistance. Later on, Yamada spends three weeks assisting Kyotaro, whether it be studying, taking notes, carrying his belongings or with home economics class. One day, Kyotaro notices the boys brought an idol magazine to class, Kyotaro is surprised that Yamada is now starring in idol magazines and talks to her about it. Although apprehensive at first, he indicates that as long as she's enjoying her job that everything is fine. Later on at the library, Kyotaro inadvertently reveals to Yamada that his broken arm is partially due to her, Yamada is distraught over this. The next day, Yamada loses her precious keychain and is in tears, her friends try to help her find her keychain. After searching the path Yamada typically walks home, Kyotaro finds the chain, noticing it was hanging on a tree branch. Due to the worsening snowfall and because they are near Yamada's house, she invites him over to warm up.
14	2	"I'm growing up" Transliteration: "Boku wa Otona no Narikake" (Japanese: 僕は大人のなりかけ)	Tarō Kubo	Kotarō Samedzuki	January 14, 2024
At Yamada's home, Kyotaro dries off and then takes a bath. Yamada provides him with a change of clothes but forgets his underwear, Kyotaro feels a bit embarrassed wearing only a tracksuit. He goes to grab his underwear but Yamada's pet dog almost pulls his tracksuit off, after a series of mishaps he finally gets everything in place. The two take a break and have a hotpot supper, looking at Yamada's yearbook. As they look back, Yamada opens up to Kyotaro about her insecurities regarding how much trouble she causes people in her life. She tears up due to feeling that she's very selfish and thinks that she takes advantage of how nice everyone is to her. Kyotaro hugs Yamada and tries his best to comfort her, letting her know that if people were actually fed up with her, they would tell her straight and not hide it. Yamada's mother returns and Yamada hides Kyotaro since he's a boy and they don't want to be caught together. After a few close calls, Kyotaro manages to leave the apartment unnoticed by Yamada's mother. While leaving the building, he is seen wearing Yamada's tracksuit by Yamada's father. He washes the tracksuit at home and returns it to Yamada later on. After some time has passed, Kyotaro no longer has his cast, and his voice has deepened. While Kyotaro is a bit anxious of his voice and changing body, Yamada is excited and tells him to make sure to say her name a lot in his new deeper voice.
15	3	"Yamada and Me"; Transliteration: "Boku wa Yamada to" (Japanese: 僕は山田と)	Kyung-soon Park	Tetsushi Takayanagi	January 21, 2024
Valentine's day is arriving and the girls in Yamada's class are trying to decide how they will celebrate the upcoming holiday. They decide to gather at Yamada's home to make chocolates together. Yamada also invites Kyotaro, although he feels unsure about being welcome. Once they arrive at Yamada's place, her mother warmly welcomes the girls. but has a visibly concerned look at Kyotaro. Realizing the tense situation, Moeko covers for Kyotaro by claiming that he's her boyfriend, which helps Yamada's mother relax, but unintentionally makes Yamada jealous. The group start the process of making chocolates and discuss Yamada's preferences in food, to give Kyotaro ideas for White day. After a while, Moeko's acting and overly familiar behavior with Kyotaro starts to irritate Yamada, and this sours the atmosphere. After contemplating his options, Kyotaro decides to come clean and admits to Yamada's mother that he and Moeko are not dating. She recognizes Kyotaro as Yamada's friend, as Yamada told her about how close they are. The two head back to the kitchen and are exposed to a surprising scene, the girls are making chocolates while looking terrified of Yamada's giant father. While tense at first, Yamada's father turns out to be friendly and starts playing video games with Kyotaro. After tasting the chocolates, the friends leave Yamada's home. Yamada expresses that she was glad Kyotaro came over. At home, Kana pokes fun at him for being surrounded by girls and says he has a soft harem, she also asks when he's going to finally ask Yamada out. Kyotaro discusses his chances of going out with Yamada with his sister and feels dejected, however he admits to his sister that he is definitely in love with Yamada and wants to be her boyfriend.
16	4	"Yamada likes..." Transliteration: "Yamada wa Boku o" (Japanese: 山田は僕を)	Ryō Ōkubo	Hiroaki Sakurai	January 28, 2024
On Valentine's Day, Yamada is elated to receive free chocolates from other girls. At the library, Yamada and Kyotaro play a made-up game called 'chocolate shogi'. Yamada uses the game as an excuse to give him a lot of chocolate. After school, Kyotaro gives Yamada a ride on his bike. They stop by a convenience store and have a snack. While eating a chocolate, Kyotaro gets some on his face. Yamada leans close and shapes the smudge into a heart before heading home. Later they run into each other once more, and Kyotaro hands her a chocolate as a present. In the evening, Yamada uses the excuse of walking her dog to drop by Kyotaro's home. She spends some time walking with him and then they talk a bit. Kyotaro remarks that Yamada has been acting strangely all day. Yamada asks Kyotaro if he got chocolate from anyone, but he says he did not. He asks Yamada if she gave any chocolate out. In response she says that she only wants to give out heartfelt chocolate. After she says she won't give out obligatory chocolate, she hands Kyotaro a homemade chocolate for Valentine's Day. Kyotaro realizes the romantic intention behind the present. After taking a bite, he tells Yamada that her chocolate is delicious and they hug. The next morning, the boys plan on what presents they should get the girls for White Day. Kyotaro manages to openly tell the boys he got chocolate on valentines day. When the school day ends, Yamada and Kyotaro head home with their arms locked.
17	5	"I Want to Know"; Transliteration: "Boku wa Shiritai" (Japanese: 僕は知りたい)	Toshiyuki Sone	Ryōyuki Shirahata	February 4, 2024
Yamada drops hints that she wants Kyotaro to go watch a movie with her. Upon realizing the hint, Kyotaro agrees to watch the film with Yamada. En route to the theater, the two run into Kana, who is operating a takoyaki stand. Kana points out the two are on a date but Kyotaro denies the notion. While eating, Yamada invites Kyotaro to observe one of her photoshoots to show him all sides of herself. Finishing their meal, Kyotaro feeds Yamada the last takoyaki. The pair go and watch the movie, Kyotaro sees a different side to Yamada. He is amazed by how genuinely excited Yamada becomes about things she likes. During the walk home, the two play shiritori. Later on Sunday, Kyotaro attends Yamada's photoshoot for the first time. When he arrives on set, he feels a bit nervous and considers leaving seeing how busy everything is. Yamada convinces him to stay and watch. He watches the photoshoot and Yamada's manager tells him that Yamada genuinely likes him a lot. Yamada's manager asks Kyotaro if he knows that their relationship might interfere with her work. He clarifies that they are not in a relationship yet, emphasizing that he simply deeply respects her. They head home and Kyotaro shows Yamada a picture he took of her, remarking that she looked beautiful.
18	6	"Yamada Likes Me"; Transliteration: "Yamada wa Boku ga Suki" (Japanese: 山田は僕が好き)	Takahiro Enokita	Ryūhei Aoyagi	February 11, 2024
Kyotaro's homeroom teacher asks him to deliver the farewell speech for this year's graduates and represent his class. He expresses reluctance, stating that he isn't a suitable fit for the role, but his classmates say otherwise. They point out that he holds the second-highest exam results, and Yamada's expectant look adds to the pressure. Under pressure, he tentatively agrees to act as the class representative for the rehearsal. Throughout the rehearsal, Kyotaro is extremely timid, speaking in a low tone and rushing through his speech. Embarrassed by his performance, Kyotaro believes he won't be selected after all for the real presentation. However, Yamada decides she wants him to present and even gives him voice lessons to improve his public speaking. Motivated by the help he received, he decides that he will deliver a performance that will impress Yamada. With a new haircut and hours of practice, Kyotaro gets himself as ready as possible for the graduation speech. Yamada and her friends help him prepare before the event and style his hair further. Right before the ceremony begins, Kyotaro realizes that he lost his speech and panics. Yamada notices he is worried so she encourages him and says that everything will work out. The ceremony begins and Kyotaro gets up for his speech, he draws up confidence and decides to give it his best shot. While he did not have a speech on hand, he manages to overcome his fear and delivers a good speech on the spot. Kyotaro's speech has a resounding impact on the audience and they applaud him. After his speech, his exhaustion and nerves finally catch up and he is sent to the school nurse to recover. At the nurse's office, Yamada is approached by Haruya who confesses that he likes her. Yamada understands his feelings, but she tells him that she likes someone else. Understanding the implication, Kyotaro realizes that it is him that she likes, but both of them walk away from each other embarrassed about hearing Yamada's confession.
19	7	"We're Overflowing"; Transliteration: "Bokura wa Afurederu" (Japanese: 僕らは溢れ出る)	Daisuke Eguchi	Ippei Ichī	February 18, 2024
Kana plays a recording of Kyotaro's send-off speech, much to his embarrassment. She jokes that he'll have to fend off the ladies developing a crush on him. After class, Yamada and her friends join the boys' basketball team for karaoke. Feeling a sense of jealousy, Kyotaro follows. He inadvertently joins when a few girls drag him into the karaoke session. Kyotaro quickly feels out of place and leaves, but Yamada follows him. This leads to a conversation in a separate karaoke room. She intuits that he followed her to the karaoke session, but is not bothered. She then asks if he heard her confession, but he does not answer. The next day, Hara and Kanzaki invite Yamada and Kyotaro on a double date to a sweets buffet. Hara and Kyotaro meet up at Harajuku where they discuss gifts that Kyotaro can get Yamada for White day. After Yamada and Kanzaki arrive, they do a bit more shopping before heading to eat. Yamada ends up jealous after mistakenly thinking that Kyotaro called Hara cute. Kanzaki gives Hara his present and the group heads home. While walking, they split up and Yamada has crepes with Kyotaro. On the train back, Kyotaro asks Yamada to take a seat at the destination station with him. After they sit down, he hands her a muffin for White Day. Yamada is overjoyed by the present. While eating, she discovers a bracelet tucked inside. Yamada asks Kyotaro to put the bracelet on her, and he does so. She smiles at him and asks him how it looks. Kyotaro replies she looks so cute he could die from it, leaving her crying with tears of joy.
20	8	"We Stayed Up Late"; Transliteration: "Bokura wa Yofukashi Shita" (Japanese: 僕らは夜更かしした)	Yoshiyuki Shirahata	Hiroaki Yoshikawa	February 25, 2024
Adachi discusses the gift he got for Sekine with Kyotaro and asks for help in delivering it. Unfortunately, when the girls show up, Kyotaro accidentally puts it in Yamada's locker. Adachi returns and, as his mother requests, expresses gratitude to Sekine for her chocolates. Later on, Yamada plays basketball with Kyotaro for fun. After winning, Yamada asks Kyotaro if she can call him "Kyo" as a nickname. On Kyotaro's birthday, they walk home together at night and run into Kyotaro's father. Kyotaro's dad informs Yamada about the birthday party, and Kyotaro decides to invite her. Yamada introduces herself to Kyotaro's parents, and they enjoy sukiyaki for dinner. Following the meal, they sing Kyotaro happy birthday and present him with a cake. Kana invites Yamada to sleep over for the night, which shocks Kyotaro. While flustered by the situation, Kyotaro tries his best to keep his composure. During the night, Yamada and Kyotaro share some Amazake and have a heartfelt conversation. Yamada provides comfort to Kyotaro after he opens up about his insecurities. The two spend several hours discussing their families before finally going to bed.
21	9	"We Made a Promise"; Transliteration: "Bokura wa Yakusoku Shita" (Japanese: 僕らは約束した)	Tarō Kubo	Takayuki Inagaki	March 3, 2024
In the morning, Yamada and Kyotaro get ready for the day. Yamada decides between finding a good nickname for Kyotaro or if she should just call him by his first name. Later on, Yamada heads for a photoshoot in Hiroshima. Kyotaro spends his day at a cherry blossom viewing party with his friends. The teenagers discuss an idol scandal while at the park. Back at home, Kyotaro takes a look at Yamada's social media. He realizes she is wearing the present he gave her, and some of her pictures hint at their relationship. He knows that this could threaten her career, since she has never officially announced that they are dating. In particular, he notices that one very devoted fan has picked up on Yamada's indiscretions. During a video call with Yamada, Kyotaro advises her to be careful. Suddenly, someone startles Yamada from behind, and the call cuts out. Without any responses from her for rest of the day, Kyotaro is left feeling anxious. Due to his anxiety about the situation, he heads to Yamada's home. Yamada's father lets him in, and they have tea together. Yamada calls home and informs her dad that she dropped her phone in water after being startled by her mom. Realizing that she has a message for Kyotaro, Yamada's dad calls her back and clears up the misunderstanding Kyotaro had. Kyotaro and Yamada both tell Yamada's father and mother simultaneously that they have a romantic interest in each other. Both parents respond positively to the news. The day after, Kyotaro is checking Yamada's social media. He sees the obsessive fan is posting of meeting Yamada. In a hurry, he heads over and has ramen with Yamada and her friend. To his surprise, Kyotaro realizes that the obsessive fan is actually Yamada's friend, Niko. Understanding this, he determines is Yamada is safe and stops worrying. On the train ride home, Yamada and Kyotaro discuss having appropriate distance in public and agree to be careful with pictures posted online.
22	10	"I Want to Be Closer to Yamada"; Transliteration: "Boku wa Yamada ni Chikazukitai" (Japanese: 僕は山田に近づきたい)	Kyung-soon Park	Hiroaki Sakurai	March 10, 2024
Kyotaro and Yamada start their third year of middle school. Excited to see each other, they hold hands, draws attention from the class. While most of Yamada's friends and Kyotaro are in the same homeroom, Chi is unsure which class she is in since her name of omitted from the lists. After a visit to the faculty office, everyone is relieved to learn Chi is in same class. After class, Yamada gives Kyotaro a wallet chain as a birthday gift. While helping him put it on, three girls enter the room. Yamada and Kyotaro hid under a desk to avoid being seen together. The girls leave, and as Kyotaro gets up, Yamada inadvertently pulls his pants down. Sekine returns to the class, sees the scene, and is shocked, stating she won't cover for them anymore. After school the boys walk home, Kyotaro is asked how he feels about Yamada. He replies that he's glad they are in the same class since they are good friends. On another day, Yamada and Kyotaro spend some time together at the library. They discuss their growth and changes in height. Despite Kyotaro considering confessing to Yamada, their time together is disrupted when Yurine walks in. The next day, Kyotaro sits in the back of the class and Yurine switches seats so that Yamada can sit next to him. In order to keep the class unaware, Kyotaro tries his best to stay at arms length with Yamada. After class, he finds a note that Yamada wrote for Yurine. The note explained that they were not a couple yet. It also mentioned that Kyotaro is really shy and that she does not need help in furthering their relationship. Embarrassed by the letter, Kyotaro also feels a greater urge to ask Yamada out.
23	11	"I Don't Want to Lose"; Transliteration: "Boku wa Maketakunai" (Japanese: 僕は負けたくない)	Minami Honma	Ryūhei Aoyagi	March 17, 2024
With nineteen days remaining until the sports festival, Kyotaro's class prepares for the upcoming event. A classmate tries to recruit Kyotaro for the team Cavalry event, but Kyotaro is unsure if he's a good fit. Kyotaro recalls the sports festival from the previous year and that he got injured breaking Yamada's fall. Yamada notices that he still has scars from the injury and apologizes. Witnessing the closeness between Yamada and Kyotaro, Adachi realizes they are in love. Driven by his own feelings, Adachi challenges Kyotaro to a one-on-one duel in the Cavalry event. Kyotaro accepts the challenge and begins training. While training at the park he runs into Yamada and they have a conversation. Yamada invites Kyotaro to her home to train using her equipment. On the day of the sports festival, Yamada and Kyotaro have fun participating in the various events. As rain begins to fall, the Cavalry battle commences. Kyotaro and Adachi have an intense heart to heart conversation on their feelings for Yamada and end their match knocked off their respective teams, forcing them to go to the nurse's office. While sitting down together, Yamada comforts Kyotaro and they have lunch together as Yamada tells Kyotaro that he looked very cool.
24	12	"I Want to Tell Her"; Transliteration: "Boku wa Tsutaetai" (Japanese: 僕は伝えたい)	Hitomi Ezoe	Kotarō Samedzuki	March 24, 2024
Due to the summer weather, Yamada switches to her summer uniform. Kyotaro feels Yamada's skirt on her request, but inadvertently embarrasses the both of them. Their homeroom teacher brings up the school trip to Kyoto and everyone decides on who their roommates will be. At home, Kyotaro realizes that Yamada has been acting strangely and avoidant since the school trip was announced. On the day of the trip, the class boards a Shinkansen train. On the ride, Kyotaro is informed by Yurine that Kanna is going to try and pair him and Yamada up. To prevent outsiders from interfering with his confession, Kyotaro keeps his distance from Yamada in Nara. Kyotaro runs into Chihiro, who tells him that Yamada is faking her enthusiasm and that she "chose this", confusing him. Later at night, the boys and girls take a bath and each respective group plays around. Following the bath, Kyotaro overhears Yamada practicing lines from a manga. Remembering Chihiro's words and seeing on her phone that her audition is on the same day as the trip, Kyotaro finally realizes why she is upset. Yamada decided to skip a major acting audition to go on the trip, which is why she is trying to convince herself that she is having fun, when she isn't. He also realizes that she chose the trip because of him. Since he has been keeping his distance the entire trip, Kyotaro starts to feel deep regret. He runs to talk to Yamada, but gets caught by their teacher. Yamada pretends that Kyotaro is Chihiro and they both get put in the girls room and Kyotaro has to hide, shocked by this turn of events.
25	13	"I, We, Fell in Love"; Transliteration: "Boku to Watashi no Koigokoro" (Japanese: 僕と私の恋心)	Daisuke Eguchi, Yoshiyuki Shirahata	Akitaro Daichi	March 31, 2024
Trapped in the girls' lodging room, Kyotaro trembles with fear of being caught. The girls talk about the types of guys that they like while Kyotaro listens in. With the lights turned off, Yamada grabs onto a startled Kyotaro. Yamada and Kyotaro nearly share a kiss while getting excited under the covers together. Kyotaro regains his composure and informs Yamada that they need to talk. Yamada leaps up from the shock and nearly blows their cover. They are nearly exposed, but Kenta appears outside the girl's room using a rope made of bedsheets. Everyone is shocked by his entrance and the girls leave the room screaming and go to the teacher. Amidst the commotion, Yamada and Kyotaro slip out of the room unnoticed. In the morning, they stroll through a set of torii gates and have their conversation. Yamada asks Kyotaro if he's having fun and he says that he is. Kyotaro asks her the same, and points out that she doesn't seem like she's having fun. Yamada begins to cry and admits to Kyotaro that she isn't having fun because the audition is constantly weighing on her. Summoning his courage, Kyotaro confesses his feelings to Yamada. During his confession, he acknowledges that she helped him come out of his shell and opened his eyes to the wonders of the world. After confessing, Kyotaro tells Yamada to head to her audition as there is still time and that she can still get the role by going to the audition. The trip ends and Kyotaro gets a few souvenirs for his family. Back home, Yamada tells Kyotaro that she wants to meet up at their usual spot. Kyotaro heads to the school library after deducing what Yamada meant. At the library, Yamada tells Kyotaro that he is her everything and that she loves him. Yamada then kisses Kyotaro on the cheek, leaving him blushing. He then gathers himself and chases after her and takes her hands as they officially become a couple.

== Home media release ==
=== Japanese ===
Avex Pictures (Japan – Region 2/A)
Vol.	Episodes	Cover art	Release date	Ref.
Season 1
1	1–4	Kyotaro reads a crime encyclopedia, Yamada eats a lollipop	June 30, 2023	
2	5–8	Kyotaro and Anna share an umbrella on a rainy day	July 28, 2023	
3	9–12	Kyotaro and Anna go for a walk on New Year's Eve	August 25, 2023	
Season 2
4	13–16	Anna gives the chocolate she made for Kyotaro	March 27, 2024	
5	17–20	Kyotaro and Anna are playing basketball	April 24, 2024	
6	21–25	Kyotaro and Anna are together	May 29, 2024	
