= NUMAnimation =

Japanese animation programming block

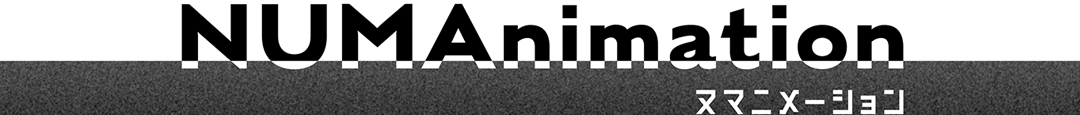
- Network: TV Asahi
- Launched: April 5, 2020; 6 years ago
- Division of: ANN
- Country of origin: Japan
- Running time: Sundays 1:30 - 2:00 (JST)
- Original language: Japanese
- Official website: Official website

NUMAnimation (Japanese: ヌマニメーション, romanized: Numanimēshon) is a Japanese late-night anime programming block planned and produced by TV Asahi under the TV Asahi Animation label, and airing under the All-Nippon News Network affiliation. The block airs on Saturday nights from 25:30 to 26:00 JST (effectively Sunday mornings from 1:30 to 2:00 a.m. JST).

== History ==
Prior to the creation of the block, the timeslot was used to rebroadcast Yuri on Ice, as well as In/Spectre. On January 22, 2020, TV Asahi announced launched the programming block, with Sing "Yesterday" for Me becoming the first program to air on the timeslot. On August 11 of the same year, it was announced that the timeslot would be converted from a local format to a networked format, and will air on all of TV Asahi's 24 channels under the ANN affiliation, becoming the network's first late-night anime timeslot, with The Gymnastics Samurai becoming the first program to air since the conversion.

== Titles ==
No.	Title	Start date	End date	Eps.	Studio	Notes	Ref.
1	Sing "Yesterday" for Me	April 5, 2020	June 21, 2020	12	Doga Kobo	Based on the manga series by Kei Toume.	
2	Neon Genesis Evangelion (Re-broadcast) (Note: Originally aired on TV Tokyo and its affiliates from October 1995 to March 1996.)	July 5, 2020	September 27, 2020	12 (Note: 12 out of the 26 episodes were selected by fans through the block's official Twitter account to be aired.)	Tatsunoko Production; Gainax (Note: TV Asahi used a rebroadcast print that omits and/or removes any mention of Gainax within the opening and ending credits.)	Original work.	
3	The Gymnastics Samurai	October 11, 2020	December 20, 2020	12	MAPPA	Original work. First series airing nationwide on ANN.	
4	World Trigger (Season 2) (Note: Season 1 aired from October 2014 to April 2016, on TV Asahi and its affiliates, but at different times.)	January 10, 2021	April 4, 2021	12	Toei Animation	Based on the manga series by Daisuke Ashihara. Sequel to World Trigger.	
5	Battle Athletes Victory ReSTART!	April 11, 2021	June 27, 2021	12	Seven	Original work.	
6	Re-Main	July 4, 2021	October 3, 2021	12	MAPPA	Original work.	
7	World Trigger (Season 3)	October 10, 2021	January 23, 2022	14	Toei Animation	Third season of World Trigger.	
8	Salaryman's Club	January 30, 2022	April 17, 2022	12	Liden Films	Original work.	
9	A Couple of Cuckoos	April 24, 2022	October 2, 2022	24	Shin-Ei Animation; SynergySP	Based on the manga series by Miki Yoshikawa.	
10	Blue Lock	October 9, 2022	March 26, 2023	24	Eight Bit	Based on the manga series by Muneyuki Kaneshiro and Yusuke Nomura.	
11	The Dangers in My Heart	April 2, 2023	June 18, 2023	12	Shin-Ei Animation	Based on the manga series by Norio Sakurai.	
12	My Tiny Senpai	July 2, 2023	October 1, 2023	12	Project No.9	Based on the manga series by Saisou.	
13	Protocol: Rain	October 8, 2023	December 24, 2023	12	Quad	Original work.	
14	The Dangers in My Heart (Season 2)	January 7, 2024	March 31, 2024	13	Shin-Ei Animation	Sequel to The Dangers in My Heart.	
15	Whisper Me a Love Song	April 14, 2024	June 30, 2024 (1–10); December 29, 2024 (11–12)	12	Yokohama Animation Laboratory; Cloud Hearts (1–10)	Based on the manga series by Eku Takeshima.	
16	Shoshimin: How to Become Ordinary	July 7, 2024	September 15, 2024	10	Lapin Track	Based on the Shōshimin Series novels by Honobu Yonezawa.	
17	You Are Ms. Servant	October 6, 2024	December 22, 2024	12	Felix Film	Based on the manga series by Shotan.	
18	Medalist	January 5, 2025	March 30, 2025	13	ENGI	Based on the manga series by Tsurumakaida.	
19	Shoshimin: How to Become Ordinary (Season 2)	April 6, 2025	June 22, 2025	12	Lapin Track	Sequel to Shoshimin: How to Become Ordinary.	
20	With You and the Rain	July 6, 2025	September 21, 2025	12	Lesprit	Based on the manga series by Ko Nikaido.	
21	My Friend's Little Sister Has It In for Me!	October 5, 2025	December 21, 2025	12	Blade	Based on the light novel series by Ghost Mikawa and Tomari.	
22	Medalist (Season 2)	January 25, 2026	March 22, 2026	9	ENGI	Sequel to Medalist.	
23	Kusunoki's Garden of Gods	April 5, 2026	June 21, 2026	12	Juvenage	Based on the light novel series by Enju and ox.	
24	The Duke's Son Claims He Won't Love Me yet Showers Me with Adoration	July 5, 2026	September 20, 2026	12	Zero-G; Grass	Based on the manga series by Kei Misawa and Natsu Mizuno.	
25	Magic Repo Man	October 4, 2026	TBA	TBA	SynergySP	Based on the web novel series by Masakichi.	
26	Arcanadea	January 2027	TBA	TBA	Yokohama Animation Laboratory	Based on the plastic model series by Kotobukiya.	

== See also ==
- Late-night anime programming blocks in Japan
- Other anime programming blocks by ANN
  - Animazing!!!, airing on Sunday mornings
  - IMAnimation, airing on Saturday evenings, and Wednesday evenings on the IMAnimation W block
