= Acony =

Acony may refer to:

- Acony (manga), a Japanese manga series by Kei Toume
- Acony Records, a record label founded by Gillian Welch
- Acony Belle Lambton, the youngest daughter of Edward Lambton, 7th Earl of Durham
