= Kurogane =

Kurogane may refer to:

- Kurogane (manga), a Japanese manga series
- Kurogane (Tsubasa: Reservoir Chronicle), a character in the anime and manga series Tsubasa: Reservoir Chronicle
- Tokyu Kogyo Kurogane, a Japanese automaker
  - Kurogane Type 95, a Japanese scout car
- Kurogane Communication, a Japanese manga series
