= Sing "Yesterday" for Me =

Japanese manga series

- First tankōbon volume cover

イエスタデイをうたって (Iesutadei o Utatte)
- Genre: Coming-of-age
- Manga
- Written by: Kei Toume
- Published by: Shueisha
- Imprint: Young Jump Comics Business; Young Jump Comics Grand
- Magazine: Business Jump (1997–2011); Grand Jump (2011–2015)
- Original run: 1997 – 2015
- Volumes: 11 + short story collection
- Anime television series
- Directed by: Yoshiyuki Fujiwara
- Produced by: Manami Kabashima; Liu Lan; Yūki Mori; Hiroshi Yanai; Daisuke Sekine; Masayo Kudō
- Written by: Yoshiyuki Fujiwara
- Music by: Kenji Tamai & agehasprings; Takaaki Kondō
- Studio: Doga Kobo
- Licensed by: Crunchyroll: SA/SEA: Medialink
- Original network: TV Asahi, BS Asahi
- Original run: April 5, 2020 – June 21, 2020
- Episodes: 12 + 6 shorts
- icon

Sing "Yesterday" for Me (Japanese: イエスタデイをうたって, Hepburn: Iesutadei o Utatte) is a Japanese manga series by Kei Toume. It was serialized in Shueisha's seinen manga magazine Business Jump from 1997 to 2011, and it moved to Grand Jump, where it ran from 2011 to 2015. Its chapters were collected in eleven tankōbon volumes. An anime television series adaptation produced by Doga Kobo aired from April to June 2020.

== Plot ==
Rikuo Uozumi has all but resigned himself to a bleak future, aimlessly working at a convenience store in Tokyo after graduating from college. His monotonous life is interrupted when the peculiar Haru Nonaka makes a lively appearance, frequently dropping by his workplace to befriend him. When Rikuo learns that an old college friend and crush, Shinako Morinome, has moved back into town, he reaches out to further their relationship. Unbeknownst to Rikuo however, Shinako is carrying painful memories from her past that were holding her back from accepting his feelings. Meanwhile, as Haru continually opens up to Rikuo, he discovers that she, much like him, is living by herself and wants to step out of her comfort zone into an uncertain future.

The past lingers long in the mind, and the future remains elusive. At a crossroads along their intertwined paths, these three experience what it means to let go of their feelings of yesterday and embrace the change that tomorrow brings.

== Characters ==
=== Main characters ===
Rikuo Uozumi (魚住 陸生, Uozumi Rikuo)
Voiced by: Chikahiro Kobayashi (Japanese); Aaron Campbell (English)
Rikuo is a college graduate unsure about his future. He currently works at a convenience store. His hobby is photography. He has feelings for Shinako.
Haru Nonaka (野中 晴, Nonaka Haru)
Voiced by: Yume Miyamoto (Japanese); Jill Harris (English)
Haru is an eccentric girl working at MILK HALL. She adopted a crow and named it Kansuke. Because of the drastic change in her appearance, Rikuo does not remember meeting her five years ago. She often drops by the convenience store before going to work.
Shinako Morinome (森ノ目 榀子, Morinome Shinako)
Voiced by: Kana Hanazawa (Japanese); Michelle Rojas (English)
Shinako is Rikuo's classmate from college. She is currently working as a high school teacher. She is still in love with Rō's already deceased older brother.
Rō Hayakawa (早川 浪, Hayakawa Rō)
Voiced by: Natsuki Hanae, Misato Murai (childhood) (Japanese); Dallas Reid (English)
Rō is Shinako's childhood friend from Kanazawa.

=== Rikuo's Circle ===
Kinoshita (木ノ下, Kinoshita)
Voiced by: Tatsuhisa Suzuki (Japanese); Jerry Jewell (English)
Rikuo's co-worker at a convenience store.
Takanori Fukuda (福田 タカノリ, Fukuda Takanori)
Voiced by: Takuma Terashima (Japanese); Lee George (English)
Rikuo and Shinako's college classmate.
Kozue Fukuda (福田 梢, Fukuda Kozue)
Voiced by: Aya Suzaki
Takanori's wife.
Chika Yuzuhara (柚原 チカ, Yuzuhara Chika)
Voiced by: Eri Kitamura
A pianist and Rikuo's ex-girlfriend. She used to be the keyboard player in Rikuo's former band and is considered to be cursed as every band she played for ended up disbanding.

=== Haru's Circle ===
Kōichi Minato (湊 航一, Minato Kōichi)
Voiced by: Yūki Ono
A professional photographer and Haru's ex-classmate who has been in love with her.
Kyōko Sayama (狭山 杏子, Sayama Kyōko)
Voiced by: Maaya Sakamoto
Haru's employer. Owner of café "MILK HALL".
Izawa (居沢, Izawa)
Voiced by: Hiroki Tanaka
Kyōko's high school classmate who's been in love with her.
Amamiya (雨宮, Amamiya)
Voiced by: Koutaro Nishiyama
Izawa's co-worker, has been in pursuit of Haru ever since meeting her.
Mimori (みもり, Mimori)
Amamiya's childhood friend.
Yōko Akimoto (秋本 陽子, Akimoto Yōko)
Voiced by: Takako Honda
Haru's birth mother.
Shōgo Kawashima (川島 省吾, Kawashima Shōgo)
Haru's step-father.
Kansuke (カンスケ, Kansuke)
Voiced by: Ryōko Maekawa
Haru's pet crow.

=== Shinako's Circle ===
Yū Hayakawa (早川 湧, Hayakawa Yū)
Voiced by: Chiaki Kobayashi
Shinako's childhood friend and Rō's brother. Died before the start of the series.
Morita (杜田, Morita)
Voiced by: Kaori Nazuka
Shinako's co-worker.
Takako Kinoshita (木ノ下 楼子, Kinoshita Takako)
Shinako's student and Kinoshita's sister.
Izumi Fukamachi (深町 泉, Fukamachi Izumi)
Takako's classmate and president of the film club.

=== Rō's Circle ===
Katsumi Takishita (滝下 克美, Takishita Katsumi)
Voiced by: Shun Horie
Rō's classmate at prep school.
Rio (莉緒, Rio)
A model working at Rō's prep school. At some point Rō's girlfriend.
Misato Kuzuhara (葛原 未里, Kuzuhara Misato)
Rō's classmate at prep school. Katsumi's target of affection.
Natsuki Nakahara (中原 夏樹, Nakahara Natsuki)
Rō's classmate at prep school. Funatsuka's girlfriend.
Funatsuka (船塚, Funatsuka)
Rō's classmate at prep school. Natsuki's boyfriend.

== Media ==
=== Manga ===
Written and illustrated by Kei Toume, Sing "Yesterday" for Me started in Shueisha's seinen manga magazine Business Jump in 1997. The name was inspired by a song of the Japanese rock group RC Succession. Business Jump ceased its publication and the last issue was released on October 5, 2011. The series was transferred to the newly launched Grand Jump, where it ran from November 16, 2011, to June 3, 2015. Its chapters were collected in eleven tankōbon volumes, released from March 19, 1999, to September 18, 2015. Extra short chapters were published during the manga run and were collected with other Toume short stories in the Sing "Yesterday" for Me EX: Visiting the Origin, Kei Toume Early Short Stories (イエスタデイをうたってEX 〜原点を訪ねて 冬目景 初期短編集〜) collection on November 20, 2009. An extra chapter, recounting the fate of Haru and Rikuo after the events of the manga, was released in Grand Jump on April 1, 2020, and a compilation of short stories, including this chapter and those published in Sing "Yesterday" for Me EX, was released on April 17, 2020, under the title Sing "Yesterday" for Me afterword (イエスタデイをうたって afterword).

=== Anime ===
An anime television series adaptation was announced in the 10th issue of Grand Jump magazine on April 17, 2019. Produced by DMM.futureworks and Doga Kobo, the series is directed by Yoshiyuki Fujiwara, with Fujiwara and Jin Tanaka writing the scripts, Junichirō Taniguchi designing the characters, Mami Aida and Kyōko Nagata designing the props, and Kenji Tamai, agehasprings, and Takaaki Kondō composing the music. It aired from April 5 to June 21, 2020, on TV Asahi's then brand new NUMAnimation programming block, as well as BS Asahi. (Note: TV Asahi listed the premiere date for the series on April 4 late at night at 1:30 a.m. JST, which is effectively April 5.) The series ran for 12 episodes, airing on television and streaming simultaneously on Abema, with six additional mini-episodes exclusively available on the platform.

==== Episodes ====
No.	Title (Note: All English titles are taken from Crunchyroll.)	Directed by	Written by	Original release date
1	"A Misfit's Attempt at Self-Reform"; Transliteration: "Shakai no Hamidashisha wa Jiko Henkaku wo Mezasu" (Japanese: 社会のはみ出し者は自己変革を目指す)	Yoshiyuki Fujiwara	Yoshiyuki Fujiwara	April 5, 2020
2	"cul-de-sac" Transliteration: "Fukurokouji" (Japanese: 袋小路)	Shinichirō Ushijima	Yoshiyuki Fujiwara	April 12, 2020
3	"What is Love?"; Transliteration: "Ai to wa Nanzo ya" (Japanese: 愛とはなんぞや)	Ryōta Itō	Jin Tanaka	April 19, 2020
4	"As the River Flows, Shinako Returns Home"; Transliteration: "Kawa wa Nagarete Shinako Kikyō" (Japanese: 川は流れて 榀子帰郷)	Hiroshi Haraguchi	Jin Tanaka	April 26, 2020
5	"The Man Named Minato"; Transliteration: "Minato to Iu Otoko" (Japanese: ミナトという男)	Tomoaki Koshida	Yoshiyuki Fujiwara	May 3, 2020
6	"The Woman Named Yuzuhara"; Transliteration: "Yuzuhara to Iu Onna" (Japanese: ユズハラという女)	Yoshiyuki Fujiwara; Kim Sung-min	Jin Tanaka	May 10, 2020
7	"Premonition of a Couple"; Transliteration: "Koibitotachi no Yokan" (Japanese: 恋人たちの予感)	Tomoaki Koshida	Yoshiyuki Fujiwara	May 17, 2020
8	"Innocent Blue"; Transliteration: "Inosento Burū" (Japanese: イノセント・ブルー)	Kazuki Horiguchi	Jin Tanaka	May 24, 2020
9	"Christmas Carol"; Transliteration: "Kurisumasu Kyaroru" (Japanese: クリスマス・キャロル)	Tomoaki Koshida	Yoshiyuki Fujiwara	May 31, 2020
10	"A New Year of Beginnings"; Transliteration: "Hajimari no Shinnen" (Japanese: はじまりの新年)	Hiroshi Haraguchi; Mitsue Yamazaki; Sumie Noro	Jin Tanaka	June 7, 2020
11	"A Spring Storm"; Transliteration: "Haru no Arashi" (Japanese: はるの嵐)	Ryōta Itō	Yoshiyuki Fujiwara	June 14, 2020
12	"The Long Way"; Transliteration: "Tōmawari" (Japanese: 遠回り)	Yoshiyuki Fujiwara	Jin Tanaka	June 21, 2020
