= Lament of the Lamb =

Japanese media franchise based on a horror manga series by Kei Toume

- Cover from volume 1 of the English release of Lament of the Lamb

羊のうた (Hitsuji no Uta)
- Manga
- Written by: Kei Toume
- Published by: Gentosha
- English publisher: NA: Tokyopop
- Magazine: Comic Birz
- Original run: November 25, 1995 – September 30, 2002
- Volumes: 7
- Original video animation
- Directed by: Gisaburō Sugii
- Written by: Gisaburō Sugii
- Music by: Ken Miyazawa
- Studio: Madhouse (Note: Production assistance (制作協力) for all episodes provided by Group TAC.)
- Released: May 25, 2003 – February 25, 2004
- Runtime: 30 minutes per episode
- Episodes: 4

Lament of the Lamb (Japanese: 羊のうた, Hepburn: Hitsuji no Uta; lit. "Song of the Sheep"), alternatively titled The Lament of a Lamb or Sheep's Song, is a Japanese horror manga series written and illustrated by Kei Toume. It follows Kazuna, a boy with a mysterious illness which turns out to be vampirism. It was adapted into a live action film in 2002 directed by Junji Hanado, a three-part Drama CD in 2002–03, and an anime OVA series in 2003–04.

The manga was licensed in North America by Tokyopop, and in Russia by Comics Factory.

== Story ==
The story centers on Kazuna, an "average high school student" who starts to lose control at the sight of blood, or even just a blood red colour (as seen in volume one when Yaegashi shows him a bottle of red paint). This problem is traced down to him being a vampire, like his lost sister, Chizuna, who he now turns to for help.

Kazuna lives with his "aunt" and "uncle" (both of whom are actually old friends of his father), after his mother died, and his father took Chizuna and left. Kazuna is friends with an aspiring artist named Yaegashi, who later learns about his condition. They both have feelings for each other at the beginning of the story.

Kazuna and Chizuna's father had committed suicide six months before the start of the (manga) story and trying to understand his suicide is one of the central plot points of the story.

== Main characters ==
- Kazuna Takashiro

Voiced by: Tomokazu Seki
Played by: Shun Oguri
Younger brother to Chizuna by two years and has recently been afflicted with the Takashiro family blood disease, a vampiric and fatal condition. Kazuna had been abandoned by his father Shizuna just after the death of his mother Momoko to live with his father's friends, the Edas. His foster father, Shin, purposely withheld any updates about his father and sister because it was Shizuna's request to have Kazuna be brought up as normal as possible since, at the time, he had no visible symptoms of the vampiric condition, compared to his sister. At the start of the series, Kazuna is visibly in love with classmate and Art Club member Yaegashi, whom he would often pose for. However, since his condition became stronger, he is forced to abandon her to keep her safe from his strong thirst for blood. Since discovering his sister Chizuna, Kazuna decides to abandon school and leave his entire life behind to cope with the disease and support Chizuna, as she is the only other person who knows about their condition. Their stay together enforces their love for each other, perhaps beyond that of a normal relationship between siblings, while he learns about the family disease, how his father become entangled with it, and the future he will have with this blood disease. Towards the end of the series, Kazuna attempts to commit suicide with a lethal pill (given to him by Chizuna), but it fails and he suffers amnesia from it.

- Chizuna Takashiro

Voiced by: Megumi Hayashibara
Played by: Natsuki Kato
Kazuna's elder sister by two years. Chizuna has been afflicted with the family blood disease from a young age and was forced to separate from Kazuna when they were young. After abandoning Kazuna, she and her father move to Yokohama where he opened a clinic, specifically to care for her and research the Takashiro family disease. She formed a relationship with her father's protege, Minase, but the bond with her father was always stronger. Her relationship with her father is implied to be more than father and daughter, because she believes he is replacing his late wife with her. When Kazuna finds her by chance, Chizuna finds this opportunity to manipulate and alienate her brother from his entire life thus far as a way to replace her father, who had been her sole caretaker since the abandonment of her brother. Chizuna is traumatized by the death of her mother in a so-called suicide and finds that it is the trigger for her bloodlust. She discovers that her father has kept the details of her mother's death and burial location from her. Towards the end of her life, she understands that Kazuna can still live a normal life and releases him back to Yaegashi. In the live-action movie, she disappears with Doctor Minase to let her brother live a normal life.

- You Yaegashi

Voiced by: Satsuki Yukino
Played by: Minami Hinase
A member of the Art Club at Kazuna's school and Kazuna's love interest. Yaegashi is often seen as reserved and likes to paint alone in the club, using Kazuna as her focus. Just before developing feelings for Kazuna, she is left in the dark about his sudden illness and did not cope well when he decides to abandon school and his life altogether. When she coincidentally meets him in public, he is forced to reveal his blood disease to her and she is later told off by Chizuna to leave him alone. Yaegashi always longed for Kazuna and finds she cannot easily let him go. On multiple occasions she would declare her resolve to be by his side or support him through his condition, but has been rejected each time. Her perseverance allows Kazuna to see that she is loving, endearing, and loyal and, since she is his trigger, he drinks from her once. Kazuna's suicide attempt to be with his sister in the afterlife gives Yaegashi another chance to properly develop their relationship with his amnesia.

- Shin and Natsuko Eda

Kazuna's foster parents and good friends of his father Shizuna. Shin and Natsuko are deeply loving foster parents to Kazuna and they have expressed a strong desire to adopt him in the hopes that he would stop longing for his father and sister. Though they are regularly updated about Shizuna's living situation with Chizuna, they are forbidden to reveal these facts to Kazuna so that he could continue to live a normal life. In turn, Kazuna keeps hidden about the facts of his recent condition and having met his sister to cope with the disease. Natsuko, the more prominent parent, often attempts to get in touch with their foster son as soon as he moved out to live with his sister for the summer duration with no hopes of his return. Despite this, she and Shin go to lengths to protect the Takashiro children, offering to adopt them both so that they can have a legal guardian and financial means.

- Doctor Minase

Chizuna's doctor and Shizuna's protege. Minase is dedicated to Shizuna's work in treating Chizuna regarding her vampiric disease because, from when she was 7, he had fallen for her charisma and charm. Time and time again, he has made it clear to her that he is romantically interested in her but eventually must face the fact that she will not reciprocate his feelings since she has Kazuna in her life. With Kazuna in their lives, Minase expends his expertise to accommodate him as well, but always makes her a priority as he strongly feels her death is near. Minase has her regularly visit the hospital he works at, a condition that her late father did not approve for fear that she will be a test subject. He also gives her an illegally obtained medication that he concocted to help ease her urges - which she had given to Kazuna as well - but this medication is slowly killing her. Minase often acts as the voice of reason to the Takashiro siblings and even to Yaegashi, who refuses to let Kazuna go. Though devastated when Chizuna dies, he has long since expected this.

- Doctor Shizuna Takashiro

Chizuna and Kazuna's father. His original family name was "Ishikura", hence he is a Takashiro by marriage rather than blood and did not inherit the disease. Shizuna willingly married his wife Momoko, quite aware of her condition despite the strong disapproval of her his mother and being disowned by his father. Only with the pleading of his mother was he forced to leave him to his friends, the Edas. Upon the death of his wife, he takes Chizuna to live a life in Yokohama where he continues to provide for her and find a cure, even opening a small clinic for the purpose of caring for her. It is speculated among family and friends that his relationship with his daughter is quite abnormal because, according to Chizuna and Minase, he was using his daughter as a crutch to live on without his wife. There is much secrecy to his life and decisions that even Chizuna and Minase did not know about because he committed suicide before divulging them. It is only towards the end of Chizuna's life that his secrets are revealed.

- Mrs. Ishikura

Chizuna and Kazuna's paternal grandmother and Shizuna's mother. Shown mostly in flashbacks, she successfully pleads with Shizuna to give up his son in order to allow him to have a normal life even though she is enraged that he married Momoko. When Shizuna committed suicide (via lethal dose), she did not allow him to be buried with the Takashiro burial site and she is last known to have visited her son's grave daily.

- Shinobu Kazami

A manga-only character. The last nurse employed by Dr. Takashiro at his clinic. She was let go when Shizuna shuts down his clinic a week before he committed suicide. A year later when she is to return home, she learned that he had committed suicide. Deeply troubled by his suicide she investigates the circumstances surrounding it and his connection with the Takashiro family, intruding upon his family and friends who have had connections with the Takashiro siblings. This led to a confrontation with Chizuna who insists that she end her investigation.

== Published books ==
Some changes have been made from the serialized version, and some of the frontispieces from the serialized version are not included.

- The regular version of Hitsuji no Uta is published by Gentosha Comics (Gentosha) in 7 volumes. There is an interview in the final volume. Due to the relocation of the magazine's parent company, there is also a Schola edition and a Sony Magazines edition.
  1. ISBN 978-4344800229 (January 2002)
  2. ISBN 978-4344800236 (January 2002)
  3. ISBN 978-4344800243 (January 2002)
  4. ISBN 978-4344800250 (January 2002)
  5. ISBN 978-4344800267 (January 2002)
  6. ISBN 978-4344800151 (January 2002)
  7. Standard edition: ISBN 978-4344801981 (February 2003)
    Limited edition (with figure): ISBN 978-4344801974 (February 2003)
- Hitsuji no Uta Complete Edition (Gentosha), 7 volumes in total. Color pages are reproduced, boxed, no interview in the final volume.
  1. ISBN 978-4344803480 (December 2003)
  2. ISBN 978-4344803558 (January 30, 2004)
  3. ISBN 978-4344803619 (January 30, 2004)
  4. ISBN 978-4344803725 (February 24, 2004)
  5. ISBN 978-4344803862 (February 24, 2004)
  6. ISBN 978-4344803862 (March 31, 2004)
  7. ISBN 978-4344803879 (March 31, 2004)
- Hitsuji no Uta (Song of the Hitsuji) Gentosha Comics Manga Bunko (Gentosha), 4 volumes in total. New cover, no interview in the final volume.
  1. ISBN 978-4344817951 (October 23, 2009)
  2. ISBN 978-4344818712 (January 22, 2010)
  3. ISBN 978-4344819504 (April 23, 2010)
  4. ISBN 978-4344820081 (July 23, 2010)
- Overseas version
  - Tokyopop has released an English version under the name "Lament of the Lamb" and a German version under the name "Das Lied der Lämmer". Additionally, a French version has been released by Delcourt under the name "Les lamentations de l'agneau", a Taiwan Chinese (Taiwanese Chinese) version has been released by Tongli under the name "The Song of the Sheep", and a Korean version has been released by Haksan Cultural Publishing under the name "양의 노래".

== Movie ==
=== Film ===
Standard edition
1 volume (limited edition with phone card available)
# GRVE-28010 (September 25, 2002)

Staff

- Director: Hanadou Junji
- Screenplay: Watanabe Mami, Hanadou Junji
- Music: Takazo Yudai, Hamaguchi Shiro
- Theme song: airi "Itsuka wa Kimi no..."
- Cinematography: Fujii Yoshihisa
- Lighting: Hayashi Kazuyoshi
- Art: Kanekatsu Koichi
- Sound: Ie Makio
- Editing: Ito Nobuyuki
- Assistant directors: Shiba Yuji, Hamada Kengo, Kusano Masami
- Music selection and sound effects: Yamamoto Fumitakatsu
- Audio editing: Sekiya Yukio
- Line producer: Suzumura Takamasa
- Development: IMAGICA
- Location cooperation: Shinshu Ueda Film Commission, Suzaka City, Suzaka City Board of Education, etc.
- Producers: Akira Narusawa, Masao Tanaka
- Planning: Takumi Ogawa, Isao Araki
- Producer: Yuzo Uchibori
- Planning cooperation: Sony Magazines
- Production cooperation: Next Produce
- Production: Groove Corporation, Union Film
- Distribution: Groove Corporation

Cast

- Takagi Issa: Oguri Shun
- Takagi Chisa: Kato Natsuki
- Yaegashi Ha: Minami
- Eda Arata: Tanaka Ken
- Eda Natsuko: Nagashima Eiko
- Minase: Suzuki Kazuma

Movie-related goods

- Hitsuji no Uta Original Soundtrack

=== Cancelled film ===
On October 14, 2006, Tokyopop announced that it had acquired the live-action film rights. The producer was to be Tokyopop CEO Stier Livi. The director was planned to be Japanese, with the characters replaced with Europeans, and the film to be an international production filmed in Romania.

According to a follow-up report from March 19, 2008, the director was going to be Takahiko Akiyama, with the title "Love Like Blood", and the story by Blake. The story is about a high school boy with anemia named Edwards who meets a beautiful girl named Jira and develops a deep relationship with her. The lead actress was planned to be Japanese, with the background music by several famous gothic bands from the 1980s to the present, and the film to be in 3D with a budget of less than $6 million.

The official website was launched on October 26, 2008, but was closed on May 1, 2012. Tokyopop also withdrew from its manga publishing division on May 31, 2011.
