= The Gymnastics Samurai =

Japanese anime series

- Cover of the Blu-ray box

体操ザムライ (Taisō Zamurai)
- Genre: Sports (gymnastics)
- Created by: Snack Marie
- Anime television series
- Directed by: Hisatoshi Shimizu
- Produced by: Kozue Kaneniwa; Ruriko Kikuchi; Makoto Kimura; Narumi Odagiri; Hiroshi Yanai; Chihiro Inoue
- Written by: Shigeru Murakoshi
- Music by: Masaru Yokoyama
- Studio: MAPPA
- Licensed by: Crunchyroll: SA/SEA: Medialink
- Original network: ANN (TV Asahi)
- Original run: October 11, 2020 – December 20, 2020
- Episodes: 11

The Gymnastics Samurai (Japanese: 体操ザムライ, Hepburn: Taisō Zamurai) is a Japanese anime television series about gymnastics. The series was produced by MAPPA, written by Shigeru Murakoshi and directed by Hisatoshi Shimizu. Character designs were created by Kasumi Fukagawa, and the music its composed by Masaru Yokoyama. The series aired from October to December 2020 on TV Asahi's NUMAnimation block.

The series was licensed by Funimation. Medialink licensed the anime in South and Southeast Asia.

== Plot ==
In 2002, the Japanese men's gymnastics team is not doing well. Jotaro Aragaki is a professional gymnast and former Olympian. However, despite being good in the past, he was never able to get a gold medal. As he suffered a shoulder injury and is an older athlete at 29 years old, his coach, Noriyuki Amakusa, suggests he retires. While considering retirement, Jotaro takes his daughter Rei to Edo Wonderland. While there, they encounter a foreigner dressed up as a ninja, who after following them home, introduces himself as Leo. Later, while announcing his retirement at a press conference, Jotaro changes his mind halfway through and decides to continue to pursue a career in gymnastics.

== Characters ==
Jōtarō Aragaki (荒垣城太郎, Aragaki Jōtarō)
Voiced by: Daisuke Namikawa (Japanese); Christopher Wehkamp (English)
Jotaro is a gymnast nicknamed "The Samurai" who belongs to Yotsuba Sports. Due to being in a slump, he had been considering retiring from gymnastics until he changes his mind during an interview.
Leonardo Sturges (レオナルド スタージス, Reonarudo Sutājisu)
Voiced by: Kensho Ono (Japanese); Brandon McInnis (English)
Leonardo is a former ballet dancer nicknamed "The Ninja" who after encountering Jotaro and his daughter Rei at Edo Wonderland follows them home and befriends them. He is being pursued by people in black suits for reasons relating to his ballet career. He is known as "Leo".
Tetsuo Minamino (南野鉄男, Minamino Tetsuo)
Voiced by: Yūki Kaji (Japanese); Austin Tindle (English)
Tetsuo is a 17-year-old gymnast nicknamed "The Bandana Prince" who is considered to be the up and coming star. After Jotaro's press conference where he changes his mind about retiring, Tetsuo confronts and calls him "a disappointment".
Noriyuki Amakusa (天草紀之, Amakusa Noriyuki)
Voiced by: Kenyu Horiuchi (Japanese); Jim Johnson (English)
Noriyuki is Jotaro's long time gymnastics coach and friend.
Rei Aragaki (荒垣玲, Aragaki Rei)
Voiced by: Rina Honnizumi (Japanese); Jill Harris (English)
Rei is Jotaro's daughter. Despite being in the 4th grade, she is very mature and manages the house while Jotaro is away.
Mari Aragaki (荒垣マリ, Aragaki Mari)
Voiced by: Atsuko Tanaka (Japanese); Wendy Powell (English)
Mari is Jotaro's mother and Rei's grandmother. She lives with both Jotaro and Rei.
Tomoyo Aragaki (荒垣知世, Aragaki Tomoyo)
Voiced by: Kotono Mitsuishi (Japanese); Kara Edwards (English)
Tomoyo was Jotaro's wife and Rei's mother as well as a former Actor. She died prior to the start the series.
Bigbird Aragaki (荒垣BB, Aragaki BB)
Voiced by: Kappei Yamaguchi (Japanese); Justin Briner (English)
Bigbird is a South American bird and the pet of the Aragakis. Bigbird can speak and seems to have a basic comprehension of Japanese. Bigbird was initially a gift from Mari to Rei.
Tomoki Takizawa (滝沢友樹, Takizawa Tomoki)
Voiced by: Hiroyuki Yoshino (Japanese); Zeno Robinson (English)
Tomoki is a gymnast and Jotaro's junior at Yotsuba Sports.
Ayu (あゆ, Ayu)
Voiced by: Nana Mizuki (Japanese); Jamie Marchi (English)
Ayu is a girl who works as a bartender for Mari and dresses in a ganguro style.
Naohiko Nakanomori (中ノ森真彦, Nakanomori Naohiko)
Voiced by: Daisuke Hirakawa (Japanese); Aaron Roberts (English)
Naohiko is Tetsuo's coach and is often referred to as "Tecchan".
Atsushi Dōjima (堂島潤, Dōjima Atsushi)
Voiced by: Kaito Ishikawa (Japanese); Caleb Yen (English)
Atsushi is a young gymnast who has a reputation for being good at the pommel horse.
Shige Nishikiori (錦織茂, Nishikiori Shige)
Voiced by: Daisuke Ono (Japanese); David Matranga (English)
Shige is a young gymnast who has a reputation for having good upper body strength.
Hiro Okamachi (岡町博, Okamachi Hiro)
Voiced by: Kengo Kawanishi (Japanese); Derick Snow (English)
Hiro is a young gymnast who goes to Shirando University. He is known for his meticulous technique and in previous years won both the All Japan Championships and the NHK Cup.
Ryū Ryūshō (リュウ・リュウショウ, Ryūshō Ryū)
Voiced by: Hiroshi Kamiya (Japanese); Howard Wang (English)
Ryū is a Chinese gymnast who has represented China in the Olympic Games. His gymnastics skills surpass those of Tetsuo.
Kitty Zhang (キティ・チャン, Kiti-chan)
Voiced by: Minami Tanaka (Japanese); Megan Shipman (English)
Kitty is a Chinese gymnast who is a fan of the actress Tomoyo Aragaki, who was Jotaro's wife and Rei's mother until her death.
Britney (ブリトニー, Buritonī)
Voiced by: Rikiya Koyama (Japanese); David Wald (English)
Britney is an acupuncturist who treated Jotaro and helped his shoulder injury.

== Episodes ==
No.	Title (Note: All English titles are taken from Funimation.)	Directed by	Written by	Original release date (Note: TV Asahi listed the series premiere at 25:30 on October 10, 2020, which is October 11 at 1:30 am)
1	"Retiring Samurai"; Transliteration: "Intai Zamurai" (Japanese: 引退ザムライ)	Kiyoshi Matsuda	Shigeru Murakoshi	October 11, 2020
2	"Rock-Bottom Samurai"; Transliteration: "Donzoko Zamurai" (Japanese: どん底ザムライ)	Yūki Nishihata	Shigeru Murakoshi	October 18, 2020
3	"Dueling Samurai"; Transliteration: "Kettō Zamurai" (Japanese: 決闘ザムライ)	Chihaya Tanaka, Seimei Kidokoro	Akira Kindaichi	October 25, 2020
4	"Samurai Daughter."; Transliteration: "Zamurai Musume." (Japanese: ザムライ娘。)	Hitoyuki Matsui	Erika Andō	November 1, 2020
5	"Battling Samurai"; Transliteration: "Gassen Zamurai" (Japanese: 合戦ザムライ)	Akari Ranzaki, Yūdai Kubota	Akira Kindaichi	November 8, 2020
6	"Samurai Father and Daughter"; Transliteration: "Oyako Zamurai" (Japanese: 親子ザムライ)	Yasunori Gotō	Tsunagi Murakoshi	November 15, 2020
7	"Training Camp Samurai"; Transliteration: "Gasshuku Zamurai" (Japanese: 合宿ザムライ)	Yasuhiro Geshi, Yūdai Kubota	Akira Kindaichi	November 22, 2020
8	"Intensive Training Samurai"; Transliteration: "Tokkun Zamurai" (Japanese: 特訓ザムライ)	Kazue Ōtsuki, Yūdai Kubota	Erika Andō	November 29, 2020
9	"Ninja & Samurai"; Transliteration: "Ninja & Zamurai" (Japanese: ニンジャ&ザムライ)	Hitoyuki Matsui, Yūdai Kubota	Kiyoko Yoshimura	December 6, 2020
10	"Samurai's Decisive Battle"; Transliteration: "Kessen Zamurai" (Japanese: 決戦ザムライ)	Yasunori Gotō	Akira Kindaichi	December 13, 2020
11	"Gymnastics Samurai"; Transliteration: "Taisō Zamurai" (Japanese: 体操ザムライ)	Hisatoshi Shimizu, Kōnosuke Uda, Kazue Ōtsuki, Yūdai Kubota, Yasuhiro Geshi, Ai Yoshimura	Shigeru Murakoshi	December 20, 2020
