= Mitsudomoe (manga) =

Japanese manga series

- Cover of Mitsudomoe's first volume as published by Akita Shoten, featuring Mitsuba, Futaba, and Hitoha Marui

みつどもえ
- Genre: Comedy, slice of life
- Manga
- Written by: Norio Sakurai
- Published by: Akita Shoten
- Magazine: Weekly Shōnen Champion; Bessatsu Shōnen Champion
- Original run: March 9, 2006 – August 12, 2017
- Volumes: 19
- Anime television series
- Directed by: Masahiko Ohta
- Produced by: Yosuke Toba; Yoshiyuki Ito; Takuo Yagi; Hiromasa Minami; Yōsuke Wada
- Written by: Takashi Aoshima
- Music by: Yasuhiro Misawa
- Studio: Bridge
- Original network: AT-X, BS11, CBC, MBS, Tokyo MX
- Original run: July 2, 2010 – September 26, 2010
- Episodes: 13 (+ 1 DVD episode)
- Anime television series

Mitsudomoe Zōryōchū!
- Directed by: Masahiko Ohta
- Produced by: Yosuke Toba; Yoshiyuki Ito; Takuo Yagi; Hiromasa Minami; Yōsuke Wada
- Written by: Takashi Aoshima
- Music by: Yasuhiro Misawa
- Studio: Bridge
- Original network: AT-X, BS11, MBS, Tokyo MX
- Original run: January 9, 2011 – February 28, 2011
- Episodes: 8

Mitsudomoe (みつどもえ; 'Three-Way Struggle') is a Japanese manga series written and illustrated by Norio Sakurai. It is about the adventures of the Marui triplets in sixth grade and their newly hired teacher Satoshi Yabe as he deals with his new class. The series was first serialized in Weekly Shōnen Champion in 2006 before moving to Bessatsu Shōnen Champion in 2012. Akita Shoten has published the series in both of their magazines. The series follows the everyday life of three sisters, their classmates, and their unfortunate teacher.

The series has been collected into nineteen tankōbon manga volumes the first of which was released on January 9, 2006. In July 2010, the manga was adapted into an anime series that ran for 13 weeks first airing on Chubu-Nippon Broadcasting. A second series called Mitsudomoe Zōryōchū! (みつどもえ 増量中！; 'Mitsudomoe: Increasing!') was made the following year that aired between January 9, 2011, and February 28, 2011. Although the series has not been licensed for release in North America, it has been simulcast by Crunchyroll which subbed the series. The first anime adaptation has received mixed reviews with most saying that while the humor will creep some out, others will enjoy it.

== Plot ==
Newly graduated Satoshi Yabe is just starting his new life as an elementary school teacher in Kamohashi Elementary School (鴨橋小学校, Kamohashi Shōgakkō). Little does he know that in his assigned 6th year class, notorious troublemakers The Marui Triplets are present. Yabe usually gets pushed around by the girls and, on occasion, abused by the triplets, who constantly try to pair him with the new school nurse, the clumsy Kuriyama Aiko, as well as continuously get him in trouble with their father, who assumes he is a pedophile. The various other students in the class are all also very wild and abnormal, often getting into hilarious situations with one another and the triplets.

== Media ==
=== Manga ===
Mitsudomoe was first written and illustrated by Norio Sakurai in tankōbon format, and has been serialized by Akita Shoten in two of their magazines. The original serialization occurred in the shōnen magazine Weekly Shōnen Champion starting in 2006, and continued for five years. Due to a "break" by the author the manga then went on hiatus between the spring of 2011 and July 2012. The manga was briefly returned to Weekly Shōnen Champion before the serialization was moved to the monthly Bessatsu Shōnen Champion magazine on August 23, 2012. The manga has continued its release through this second magazine, and nineteen tankōbon have been collected from the serial chapters. The first release goes back to January 9, 2006, and has continued with the nineteenth volume being released on October 6, 2017. Outside Japan, the series has been licensed by Doki Doki in France and Tong Li Comics in Taiwan. In addition to the main series, a spin-off series called Almost Weekly Mitsudomoe (ほぼ週刊みつどもえ) was also released. The chapters featured in the spin-off could not be published with the main series. The series ended serialization in the September issue of Akita Shoten's Bessatsu Shōnen Champion on August 12, 2017.

=== Anime ===
In November 2009 an anime adaptation of the manga by the studio Bridge was announced, to be directed by Masahiko Ohta The first season aired on Chubu-Nippon Broadcasting between July 2, 2010, and September 26, 2010. Others broadcast networks are BS11 Digital, AT-X, MBS and Tokyo MX. New episodes are currently being subtitled by MX International and simulcast on Crunchyroll. The series began release on Blu-ray and DVD from August 25, 2010. An originally unaired episode was included with the seventh volume released on February 23, 2011, and also aired on March 6, 2011, following the second season. A second season of the anime, titled Mitsudomoe Zōryōchū! (みつどもえ 増量中！) was announced with the 10th volume of the manga and aired between January 9, 2011, and February 28, 2011. It was also simulcast on Crunchyroll.

The first season uses two pieces of theme music, one opening and one ending theme. The opening theme is "Count to Three and Assemble!" (みっつ数えて大集合!, Mittsu Kazoete Daishūgō!) by Ayahi Takagaki, Satomi Akesaka and Haruka Tomatsu while the ending theme is "Lovely Dream" (夢色の恋, Yume-iro no Koi) by Saori Atsumi. The second season uses four pieces of theme music, two opening themes and two ending themes. The main opening theme is "We are Elementary School Students" (わが名は小学生, Waga Na wa Shōgakusei) by Takagaki, Akesaka and Tomatsu, while the main ending theme is "Randselling" (ランドセリング☆, Randoseringu) by Nomiko. For the first episode, the respective opening and ending themes are "Serious Squadron Gachirangers" (本気戦隊ガチレンジャー, Honki Sentai Gachirenja) and "Another Morning" (またあした, Mata Ashita), both performed by Bakuryuu Sentai Abaranger singer, Masaaki Endoh.

== Reception ==
The anime adaptation of Mitsudomoe has received mixed reviews. Four reviewers from Anime News Network gave the first episode of the first season various reviews. Two reviewers, Hope Chapman and Gia Manry, gave the episode a 2 out of 5 rating. Chapman called the humor for the episode an "acquired taste" saying that the opening should make anyone who has babysat before have a "kneejerk reaction". While calling the content revolting He goes on to say it isn't garbage but that it isn't South Park material yet. Gia Manry calls the three main character girls "psychotic" and the gags for the most part not funny. She goes on to say that the characters overall are so simplistic their reactions are predictable. In the end she gave the episode a 2 based on Hitoha "who actually develops somewhat". Carl Kimlinger gave the episode a 3 out of 5 rating saying that while the content may turn some people away it is "their loss". He goes on to say though that if the humor success rate stays at 50% then its future is limited. The last reviewer, Theron Martin, gave the episode the highest rating of a 4.5 out of 5. He calls the episode "cleverly-written" and "wonderfully-scored" saying that if you like the type of raunchy humor the episode aimed at adults has then it is the one for you.

Overall, Carl Kimlinger from Anime News Network gave the first season a grade of a B− to a B+. He praises the first seven episodes for being very funny from the misunderstandings to the episode-long jokes. He goes on to say though that the episodes are vulgar, more than slightly disgusting, and highly creepy for some. For the last six episodes Kimlinger rated them better giving them the B+ rating. He calls the episodes warmer, more character-based, and less of a turnoff than the first seven episodes. He singles out episode 9 as being "downright brilliant". He goes on to say though that even though the final six episodes are less vulgar they will still creep many out. Carl gives the second season a rating of a C+ saying that while the cast is "surprisingly enjoyable" the humor feels recycled.
