= Kurogane (manga) =

Japanese manga series by Kei Toume

- Cover of first English edition by Del Rey Manga

黒鉄
- Genre: Action; Historical; Drama
- Manga
- Written by: Kei Toume
- Published by: Kodansha
- English publisher: NA: Del Rey Manga
- Imprint: Open KC; Morning KC
- Magazine: Morning Open Zōkan (1996); Morning (1997–2003)
- Original run: February 1996 – August 7, 2003
- Volumes: 5
- Manga

Kurogane Kai
- Written by: Kei Toume
- Published by: Shueisha
- Magazine: Grand Jump
- Original run: February 1, 2017 – October 21, 2020
- Volumes: 5
- icon

Kurogane (Japanese: 黒鉄), also known as Black Steel, is a Japanese manga series written and illustrated by Kei Toume. It was first serialized in Kodansha's Morning Open Zōkan between February and November 1996, then transferred to the publisher's seinen manga magazine Morning in June 1997; in August 2003, the manga went on a long hiatus. Its chapters were collected in five tankōbon volumes by Kodansha; in February 2017, the manga resumed serialization under the title Kurogane Kai in Shueisha's Grand Jump magazine, which completed in October 2020 with its chapters collected in five volumes by Shueisha.

== Plot ==
Kurogane tells the tale of "Hitokiri Jintetsu", a boy just in his teens who has become renowned for his swordsmanship and his proficiency in killing, despite his young age. After getting revenge on his father's murderer, Jintetsu is forced to constantly flee from bounty hunters who wish to collect the price on his head. Despite the skill of these killers, none are capable of besting him in combat, and he's consistently victorious. The deaths that lay in wake earn him the "Hitokiri" moniker. Unfortunately, as fate would have it, he ends up meeting his fate not by someone of equal or even greater skill, but rather by a pack of wild dogs. Though he eventually slays them all, he is fatally wounded.

A ronin named Genkichi finds him in his final moments, and he tells the man that he is ready to die so he should hurry up and finish him off. Genkichi informs him that he has no intention of killing him since his wounds will take care of that anyway. When Jintetsu finally dies of blood loss, the former samurai brings him back to his home and actually manages to revive him. However, there is a horrible catch. A great portion of the boy's body was destroyed, so in order to compensate, Genkichi constructed a partially mechanized body of steel and wood (though there is an inconsistency where the first chapter of manga shows him with a fully mechanical body, while the end of the manga portrays him as only be partly mechanical). Although he also managed to repair most of the killer's nerves and motor functions, he is unable to repair his vocal cords and right eye, slightly impairing the swordsman's abilities and making him mute. Jintetsu does not take to his revival kindly, but is forced into inaction since he isn't used to his body just yet. He is then given new clothes to hide his appearance, and a new sword that Genkichi also notes as being mechanized.

Eventually, Jintetsu comes to accept his existence, though he later finds out Genkichi only built him to prove to his former master his ingenuity. His creator then dies after getting his revenge on the said master, apologizing to the assassin for using him before succumbing to his wounds. Jintetsu, surprisingly, seems to forgive him, burying him rather than leaving his corpse as it lay. He then uses the sword he had given him as a grave marker, and begins to walk away from the scene. However, before he can leave the area, the sword speaks and implores Jintetsu to not leave his equipment behind and to take him with him. Though surprised, he obliges, and the sword reveals his name to be Haganemaru, and that he can read Jintetsu's thoughts since the two share a mind. Therefore, not only is he his weapon, but can also speak for him on his behalf. The manga then follows their adventures as Jintetsu works as an assassin-for-hire and Haganemaru as his instrument of death. All the while he is trying to throw away his past, and escape from the various people who are seeking vengeance for what he had done. Along the way he meets a particularly determined young girl named Makoto, who wants to avenge the destruction of her family, and subsequently ends up becoming a makeshift companion. He also earns the nickname of "Jintetsu of Steel" for his metallic face, which many assume is a mask despite it actually being an irremovable part of his body since his revival.

As he travels the land, he has Hagemaru as his personal weapon. He travels as a drifter without direction. He met several people in his past along the way, including his former childhood friend and lover, several former acquaintances, Hagemaru's former lover who now part of a traveling performance trope, and lastly, another daughter of his victim who wants to challenge him in order to prove herself to be strong.

== Characters ==
=== Main characters ===
Jintetsu/Jintetsu of Steel
Jintetsu is the central character of the manga. He actually dies within the first few pages before being revived as a cyborg by Genkichi. He does not gain any of the usual abilities attributed to partially mechanical men, but parts of his body do become their own weapons. For whatever reason, his benefactor saw it fit to have some of his limbs capable of ejecting blades and the like, allowing him to fight his battles in unorthodox ways (all the fingers in his left hand are actually blades). He is also incapable of digesting food, not without properly meshing before consuming it. He is initially portrayed as a cold blooded killer, where the look of pure hate in his eyes was enough for any man to freeze in their tracks upon facing him. However, as the manga goes on, it is revealed that he is actually rather altruistic, and follows a certain code of honor in deal with his mercenary jobs (not to be confused with Bushido). Despite his job as an assassin-for-hire, he is more often seen rescuing or protecting people rather than committing to his assignments. He also reveals in various dialogue that he has no set destination, and is accepting that he will die in battle one day or on the side of a road. A bleak existence he doesn't mind living out.
In the past, Jintetsu used to belong a rather powerful clan known as the Senjiro family. However, after his father was murdered, Jintetsu vowed vengeance and slew who he thought was his killer. At the same time, he was forced to go through one of his best friends, who was a pupil to the murderer. His death becomes one of the more frequent things that haunt the drifter, as well as frequent encounters with those from his past. He was a childhood friend to a girl named Otsuki, who promised to await his return after he left, and continued to wait despite news of his death. He later returns to his hometown to bring justice to both the Eizo family who he thought killed his father, and the Senjiro family for actually orchestrating the events. He also rescues Otsuki in the struggle. Seeing her childhood friend at last, she implores him to stay and tells him that she doesn't care what he has done or what happened to him. However, Jintetsu leaves her regardless, telling her that her friend was gone, and that he is nothing more than a ghost. He also meets Ryujiro, as man he once looked up to as a child, and Renji the Firewalker, a fellow assassin he frequently worked with. The two are actually seeking to kill each other, separating Jin's loyalties and making his emotions conflicted. He later decides to intervene regardless, and despite his best efforts, both die during combat. Renji leaves behind an adopted daughter, Makoto, who decides that with her "father's" death, she only has one purpose in life now: to kill Jintetsu and avenge her family. Likewise, he doesn't mind that she wants to kill him, seeing that it makes it easier to look after her if she's close.
Jintetsu has a knack for dramatic appearances. He often enters combat at the most opportune times, and is usually accompanied by a flock of crows. He also does an incredible amount of deeds for the benefit of others, putting himself in precarious situations. More than once, he has framed himself for the murders of other, so as to bring the relatives, friends, or the killers themselves some peace. He also never speaks with his own voice, instead relying upon his sword to be his voice.
Haganemaru
Haganemaru is the other main character in the manga, acting as Jintetsu's only true companion and also his voice. He was once a human being, the eldest son of Kanemasa Fujinami, and an accomplished swordsman. When his father was killed by a ronin over a minor disagreement, Haganemaru sought out revenge. Though he succeeded, he later died of his wounds. He left behind a fiancé named Oto, a childhood friend who he saw more as a sister than a lover. Somehow, his brain managed to persevere, and actually regained consciousness when his corpse was taken in by Genkichi. By this time, only his brain and one eye was completely intact, so Haganemaru asked the inventor to make him into a sword. He obliged and became Jintetsu's weapon from then on out, his single eye being embedded into the hilt of the sword.
It is later revealed that Haganemaru can not actually speak without Jin in close proximity, as his mind is actually stored within the boy. So, in essence, both need each other to carry out a meaningful existence. Haganemaru often acts as a source of advice to the younger man, and also an extra eye to make up for the one the drifter lost. One chapter is dedicated to his past, where he tries to resolve his past with Oto, who had tried to kill herself upon hearing of her husband's death. Though she did not succeed, she was later taken in by a traveling show to act a "living doll" in their performance. It is later revealed she had become a serial killer, intent on murdering girls for the life she could no longer have. Haganemaru asks Jintetsu to kill her for him, as she no longer retained her sanity. Though, as fate would have it, she later dies from another's blade. With that, the sword resolves his past and past conflicts with him do not surface again.

=== Supporting characters ===
Makoto
Makoto, otherwise known as "Makoto the Scarlet Sparrow." She gained a reputation for being a companion of Renji the Firewalker, a very famous and skilled assassin. She once belonged to the powerful Akagi family, but after they are framed for theft, the family is utterly destroyed and their leader kills herself in prison. Makoto was left the only survivor, barely managing to escape death herself. Renji pitied her and took her under his wing, taking her town to town as he dealt with his jobs. Though, it's notable to say that he didn't initially want a companion, but she proved to be rather tenacious in following him. She calls him "father" but there is actually no blood relation between the two. In fact, Renji can see that she loves him in a way more than that, much to his dismay. When he dies, she sees her only purpose is to kill Jintetsu, whom she believes is the one who framed her family. Throughout the manga, she frequently tails him, but refrains from ever dealing a killing blow when he is resting or asleep, wanting to kill him in a fair and outright fight. Humorously, she is often seen helping him, reasoning that she can't let others kill him or allow him to get in trouble before their last battle. Similarly, Jintetsu often comes to her rescue, and puts himself in harm's way to protect her. He would even go as far as disobeying the men who hired him, or facing various enemies horribly injured and alone to ensure her safety. At the end of the manga, she finally sees the selflessness in him, and realizes he could've never had framed her family. This drives her to throw herself at the feet of his would-be-killer, restraining the assassin from finishing an injured Jintetsu off. She later remarks to Ayame that she has found a new purpose in paying back Jintetsu for all that he had done for her.
Makoto was raised as a boy to be the next heir of the Akagi family, and as a result, is often seen as brash and odd by others. Though she poses as a young boy, there are a few observational people who can see that she is a woman. A running gag is that many of the women she encounters often remark that she is wasting her good looks, to which Makoto usually responds to with anger. She is more skilled with the sword than the ordinary person, but is notably lacking in ability when compared to those like Jintetsu. She is one of the few people who knows of Haganemaru and his link with Jin.
Genkichi
Genkichi is an inventor a former samurai. He is the one responsible for Jintetsu's current condition as well as Haganemaru's current body. Though he is a genius and a pioneer of incredible new technology, his work is shunned as being impossible. He attempts to get work in the shogunate, but is turned away for being classified as a ronin. His former master had accepted his resignation, but did not give him his blessing. Additionally, his master made the death of his lover look accidental when she witnessed his illegal dealing. As a result, Genkichi was forced to live a poor life, vowing revenge. He eventually accomplishes this after showcasing Jintetsu, and killing his master, accepting his eventual death.
Renji
Renji the Firewalker is a renowned assassin who had worked with Jintetsu before he became what he is now. He is also Makoto's mentor and rescuer. Of the many characters in the manga, Renji is one of the few people Jin has openly admitted that he was unsure of being able to beat. He has a notable burn scar on his face, and has the facade of an emotionless killer. He later admits that he has gotten as soft as Jintetsu after having Makoto around him for so long, and explains to him his reasonings for protecting her. He later dies in an altercation, and before his last breath, he tries to confess to Makoto that it was he who had framed her family and that he was sorry. Unfortunately, only Jintetsu was there to hear it, and in order to protect Makoto's memory of him, refrains from telling her the truth.
Ayame
Ayame is another drifter like Jintetsu and Makoto, and often encounters the two in their equal wanderings. Though whereas latter two make a living by carrying out assassinations, she does so by rigging gambling games. She was once part of a rich family, but they eventually lost their power and money, forcing all of them to separate. Her brother is her only known relative. She is considered one of Jintetsu's few friends, and often helps him when she can. She also saw through Makoto's guise and surmised that she was a woman. Humorously, when Makoto tries to claim she's a man, Ayame punches her in the face and concludes the truth. At the end of the manga, she tends to Jintetsu's and Makoto's injuries after the final battle. She then sees Makoto off as she chases after the titular character.

== Publication ==
Kurogane on the cover of Morning No. 46 (October 1997)

Written and illustrated by Kei Toume, Kurogane began as a one-shot published in Kodansha's seinen manga magazine Monthly Afternoon on November 25, 1993, (Note: Published in the magazine's January 1994 issue, released on November 25, 1993.) after it won the Shiki Prize of the Autumn 1993 Afternoon Shiki Shō. It was first serialized in Kodansha's Morning Open Zōkan magazine in its February 1996 issue, (Note: Cover dated February 5, 1996.) to its November 1996 issue when the magazine ceased publishing. (Note: Cover dated November 6, 1996.) It was then transferred to the publisher's seinen manga magazine Morning in June 1997, (Note: It started in the magazine's 24th issue of 1997 (cover date June 19).) and ran in the magazine until August 7, 2003, when the series went on a long hiatus. (Note: It went on hiatus in the magazine's 36/37th issue of 2003 (cover date August 21), published on August 7.)

In November 2016, it was announced that the manga would return with a new title, Kurogane Kai. It resumed serialization on February 1, 2017, in Shueisha's Grand Jump magazine. Beginning in February 2020, the manga went on hiatus for three months. Kurogane Kai concluded its serialization on October 21, 2020. Kodansha published the first five tankōbon volumes of Kurogane from August 21, 1996, to October 20, 2001, and Shueisha published Kurogane Kai's five volumes from March 19, 2018, to December 18, 2020.

In North America, Del Rey Manga announced the English language release of the first series in October 2005. The five volumes were published between June 27, 2006, and June 26, 2007. The manga is also licensed in France by Glénat and in Italy by Star Comics.

=== Kurogane volumes ===
No.	Original release date	Original ISBN	English release date	English ISBN
1	August 21, 1996	978-4-06-338007-1	June 27, 2006	978-0-34-549203-6
2	December 14, 1996	978-4-06-338010-1	September 26, 2006	978-0-34-549204-3
3	February 20, 1998	978-4-06-338015-6	December 26, 2006	978-0-34-549205-0
4	February 19, 1999	978-4-06-338017-0	March 27, 2007	978-0-34-549206-7
5	October 20, 2001	978-4-06-338022-4	June 26, 2007	978-0-34-549207-4

=== Kurogane Kai volumes ===
No.	Release date	ISBN
1	March 19, 2018	978-4-08-890768-0
2	April 19, 2019	978-4-08-891132-8
3	October 18, 2019	978-4-08-891390-2
4	July 17, 2020	978-4-08-891681-1
5	December 18, 2020	978-4-08-891745-0

== Reception ==
Kurogane Kai's first volume ranked third of the top-selling manga in Japan from March 19 to March 25, 2017; the second volume ranked fifth of the top-selling manga in Japan from April 15 to April 21, 2019; and the fifth volume ranked seventh of the top-selling manga in Japan from December 14 to December 20, 2020.

Reviewing the first volume, Manga News called the manga "lively, strong, surprisingly action-packed that evokes emotions in the reader", and described the manga as "fairly pleasant, very dynamic". Writing for Anime News Network (ANN), in his review of the second and third volume, Carlo Santos called the manga not only an action-packed historical romp, but also a historical drama full of emotions, which shows the reaction of people when tragedy and trouble occur, and wrote: "to the genre, Kurogane turns out to be a thoughtful action series—not the deepest by any means, but definitely with enough substance to it". In the third volume he gave a "B+" grade to the art, adding: "Toume's sketchy but vibrant art adds another dimension to the series, creating a historical Japan that evokes Koike and Kojima's classics but not quite as stodgy" and stating: "In a way, Kurogane is the anti-Basilisk, a historical series that focuses not on outrageous ninja battles but on down-to-earth, human problems". Katherine Dacey from Pop Culture Shock gave an "A-" grade to the second and third volume, writing that "manga-ka Kei Toume is indebted to Frankenstein as much as Vagabond for his characters and plot twists"; she praised the main character and called it a wonderful creature. Dan Polley of Manga Life described the manga as a samurai story whose the "art within are scraggily and, yet, precise" and wrote: "Kurogane is a blend of Lone Wolf and Cub and Blade of the Immortal, with a sprinkle of Usagi Yojimbo thrown in for good measure. It's compelling without being forceful, exciting without going over the top". In Manga: The Complete Guide, Jason Thompson wrote about how he felt the focus in the manga was not on the fight scenes, which he found "unexciting", but rather on the character interactions, giving it three stars out of four.
