= Kei Toume =

Japanese manga artist

Kei Toume 冬目 景
- Born: April 13 Zama, Japan
- Area: Manga artist
- Notable works: Lament of the Lamb; Kurogane; Sing "Yesterday" for Me

Kei Toume (冬目 景, Tōme Kei; born April 13) is a Japanese manga artist.

Kei Toume studied at the Tama Art University in Tokyo. Her first manga, Rokujō gekijō, was published in Comic Burger magazine in 1992. The manga won her the Shiki prize in a contest held by Kodansha in 1993. A year later, her follow-up manga Mannequin also won a prize.

She started the series Lament of the Lamb in Comic Burger in 1996. After the disappearance of this magazine, the manga was continued in Comic Birz. This series ran for six years and was adapted into a radio play, an anime and a live action film.

In 1997, she began Sing "Yesterday" for Me manga. In addition, Toume contributes to a lot of fanzines and specialized magazines, and is also active in video games and films.

Her manga Kurogane and Lament of the Lamb have been translated into English by Del Rey Manga and Tokyopop respectively.

== Works ==
- Acony
- Fuguruma-kan Raiho Ki
- Gen'ei Hakurankai
- Hatsukanezumi no Jikan
- Kurogane
- Kurogane-kai
- Lament of the Lamb
- Luno
- Momonchi
- Our Rhythm Change
- Sing "Yesterday" for Me
- Static Noise Princess
- Static Princess
- Zero
