= The Dangers in My Heart =

Japanese manga series and its adaptation(s)

- First tankōbon volume cover, featuring Anna Yamada (front) and Kyotaro Ichikawa (back)

僕の心のヤバイやつ (Boku no Kokoro no Yabai Yatsu)
- Genre: Romantic comedy; Slice of life
- Manga
- Written by: Norio Sakurai
- Published by: Akita Shoten
- English publisher: NA: Seven Seas Entertainment
- Imprint: Shōnen Champion Comics
- Magazine: Weekly Shōnen Champion (March 8–April 2018); Champion Cross (April–July 2018); Manga Cross/Champion Cross (July 2018–present)
- Original run: March 8, 2018 – September 15, 2026
- Volumes: 14
- Anime television series
- Directed by: Hiroaki Akagi (Note: Credited as Chief Director for the third season); Chen Dali (S3)
- Written by: Jukki Hanada
- Music by: Kensuke Ushio
- Studio: Shin-Ei Animation
- Licensed by: NA: Sentai Filmworks; SEA: Plus Media Networks Asia; UK: Anime Limited
- Original network: ANN (TV Asahi)
- English network: SEA: Aniplus Asia
- Original run: April 2, 2023 – present
- Episodes: 25
- Light novel

The Dangers in My Heart – The Novel
- Written by: Kota Nozomi
- Illustrated by: Norio Sakurai; sune
- Published by: Media Factory
- English publisher: NA: Seven Seas Entertainment
- Imprint: MF Bunko J
- Published: September 25, 2024
- Manga

The Dangers in My Heart: The Romantic Comedy Won't Start
- Written by: Haika Nanasaka
- Published by: Akita Shoten
- English publisher: NA: Seven Seas Entertainment
- Imprint: Shōnen Champion Comics
- Magazine: Champion Cross
- Original run: July 22, 2025 – present
- Volumes: 2
- icon

The Dangers in My Heart (Japanese: 僕の心のヤバイやつ, Hepburn: Boku no Kokoro no Yabai Yatsu) is a Japanese web manga series written and illustrated by Norio Sakurai. It was serialized on the Champion Cross manga website, and its chapters were collected in 14 tankōbon volumes. The series follows Kyotaro Ichikawa, a shy middle school boy who initially fantasizes about killing his popular classmate, Anna Yamada, but over time begins to fall in love as he gets to know more about her.

An anime television series adaptation produced by Shin-Ei Animation aired from April to June 2023. A short spin-off original net animation (ONA) for the series was released in December 2023. A second season aired from January to March 2024. A third season is set to premiere in April 2027.

== Premise ==
Kyotaro Ichikawa is a disgruntled loner student who is often reading a murder encyclopedia and learning about human anatomy. He fantasizes about murdering his popular classmates, with the beautiful class idol, Anna Yamada, being his prime target. However, when he observes that Anna is rather quirky in her own way, and when she becomes increasingly friendly towards Kyotaro, he gradually warms up to her and they start to become closer and eventually fall in love.

== Characters ==
=== Main ===
Kyotaro Ichikawa (市川 京太郎, Ichikawa Kyōtarō)
Voiced by: Shun Horie (Japanese); Clint Bickham (English)
A middle school boy who has chūnibyō tendencies. He loves spending time reading books in the library, where he and Anna first met. Initially, Kyotaro had delusions of killing Anna and making her corpse his alone, but they are replaced by romantic affection as he spends more time around her. He can be quite perceptive in social situations but often fails to pick up on other social cues due to his lack of communication skills and low self-esteem. Aside from his macabre interests, he is also a fan of manga and anime such as Baki, Beastars, and Re:Zero. In the latter case, he keeps the character Rem as the profile image for his Line account. Prior to middle school, he won a number of first-place awards for essays, a poster drawing, an independent research project, etc.
Anna Yamada (山田 杏奈, Yamada Anna)
Voiced by: Hina Yōmiya (Japanese); Katelyn Barr (English)
A tall middle school girl who is a magazine model and actress, active under the name Anna Akino (秋野 杏奈, Akino Anna). She is very popular with both boys and girls but has a clumsy side to her. Anna frequently brings snacks and candy to eat in private at the library, much to Kyotaro's dismay, even though bringing them to school is prohibited. She is very considerate of others, such as eating snacks by herself due to her friend Chihiro having allergies. This consideration is tied to something of a guilt complex, which leads to bouts of anxiety where she feels she is an inconvenience to other people. She is also shown to be very jealous to the point of obsession whenever Kyotaro interacts with other girls. She is usually referred to by her last name by others, with only her family and manager calling her by her first name.

=== Supporting ===
Chihiro Kobayashi (小林 ちひろ, Kobayashi Chihiro)
Voiced by: Ayaka Asai (Japanese); Kara Greenberg (English)
Anna's best friend who acts as her tsukkomi. Anna calls her "Chii" (ちぃ) and Sekine calls her "Bayashiko" (ばやしこ). In Kyotaro's mind, she is Anna's "boyfriend" due to how tactile they are. She is a member of the basketball club. She is oblivious to the relationships of the people around her, even not realizing that she was once used as bait by Haruya to get closer to Anna until Moeko and Serina points it out to her, much to her embarrassment. She is also the only one of Anna's friends who is currently unaware that Anna and Kyotaro are dating.
Moeko Sekine (関根 萌子, Sekine Moeko)
Voiced by: Megumi Han (Japanese); Emi Lo (English)
Anna's friend who is a gyaru and calls herself "Moe" (萌). Despite Kyotaro's belief that she is stupid, she is academically capable, once scoring fifth in her entire grade. She claims to be a manga fan while only naming more famous series during the work-study field trip. While exchanging Line with Kyotaro, she recognizes his profile icon as Rem from Re:Zero and prefers Rem's sister Ram. Moeko is also socially adept, often saving Anna and Kyotaro from embarrassing situations. However, her closeness to Kyotaro also means that Moeko is a target of Anna's jealousy. The second person to discover Anna and Kyotaro's mutual feelings for each other, she will sometimes try to subtly help push Kyotaro in the right direction when it comes to getting him to express his feelings for her.
Serina Yoshida (吉田 芹那, Yoshida Serina)
Voiced by: Atsumi Tanezaki (Japanese); Olivia Swasey (English)
Anna's reserved friend with a sharp gaze and Anna calls her "Nyaa" (にゃあ). She is interested in dancing, hair styling, and is a big fan of delinquent manga such Crows and Worst. She has a neutral opinion of Kyotaro but also sees him as unreliable, though later on when she becomes one of the people earliest to discover Yamada and Kyotaro having feelings for each other she grows to support him, even trying to help get the two together. She attended the same elementary school as Rin.
Sho Adachi (足立 翔, Adachi Shō)
Voiced by: Nobuhiko Okamoto (Japanese); Scott Gibbs (English)
Kyotaro's classmate, who always blurts out perverted thoughts. He reveals to Kyotaro that he has genuinely fallen in love with Anna, and this rivalry culminated during the sports festival in their third year. Despite Kyotaro's defeat, Adachi yielded to Kyotaro and remains his friend.
Kana Ichikawa (市川 香菜, Ichikawa Kana)
Voiced by: Yukari Tamura (Japanese); Genevieve Simmons (English)
Kyotaro's elder sister, a musician and a university student at Waseda University. She approves of her brother's relationship and is very close to Anna. She is shown to be sensitive when it comes to her own non-existent love life.
Sanae Yamada (山田 早苗, Yamada Sanae)
Voiced by: Yūko Minaguchi (Japanese); Christine Auten (English)
Anna's mother. She appears at first to be strict in public due to Anna's behavior, but is an overall nice woman who dotes on her daughter at home and approves of Anna's crush on Kyotaro.
Yukina Yamada (山田 雪菜, Yamada Yukina)
Voiced by: Yoshimasa Hosoya (Japanese); Jay Hickman (English)
Anna's father. A tall, quiet man who works as a French chef. He plays video games when off work.
Yurine Hanzawa (半沢 ユリネ, Hanzawa Yurine)
Voiced by: Reina Ueda (Japanese); Annie Wild (English)
Yamada and Kyotaro's new classmate during their final year. She is a tall and beautiful girl with blonde hair. Her classmates see her as a cool beauty, but in truth, she also has a cute and clumsy side, just like Anna. She is close friends with Kanna.
Kanna Ando (安堂 カンナ, Andō Kanna)
Voiced by: Yuka Iguchi (Japanese); Karlii Hoch (English)
Anna and Kyotaro's classmate during their final year. Nicknamed "Kankan" (カンカン), she always wears a black mask and twin tails. Kanna is greatly interested in others' love lives to the point of throwing a flash mob for a new couple, despite their embarrassment.

=== Other ===
Kenta Kanzaki (神崎 健太, Kanzaki Kenta)
Voiced by: Gen Satō (Japanese); Greg Ayres (English)
Kyotaro's classmate, part of the perverted trio with Adachi and Ota, and a member of the baseball club. He is known for having proud yet strange fetishes, such as for chubby or bad-smelling women. Despite this, he is viewed favorably for being nice otherwise. He is romantically interested in Hara, who eventually reciprocates his feelings and goes out with him outside of school.
Chikara Ota (太田 力, Ōta Chikara)
Voiced by: Jun Fukushima (Japanese); Courtland Johnson (English)
Kyotaro's classmate, who is overweight. He is part of the perverted trio along with Kanzaki and Adachi.
Honoka Hara (原 穂乃香, Hara Honoka)
Voiced by: Aki Toyosaki (Japanese); Natalie Rial (English)
Anna and Kyotaro's classmate. A chubby girl who is interested in Kanzaki and eventually starts dating him. She is the first person to find out about Anna and Kyotaro's romantic interest in each other.
Haruya Nanjo (南条 ハルヤ, Nanjō Haruya)
Voiced by: Nobunaga Shimazaki (Japanese); Ben McLaughlin (English)
An upperclassman one year above the main cast. He is nicknamed "Nanpai" (ナンパイ) by Kyotaro due to his persistence in getting closer to Anna. During his graduation, he confessed to Anna and was rejected.
Mamiya (間宮)
Voiced by: Madoka Asahina (Japanese); Cat Thomas (English)
Haruya's childhood friend and classmate, who is interested in him.
Rin Kanaoya (金生谷 倫, Kanaoya Rin)
Voiced by: Yū Serizawa (Japanese); Hilary Haag (English)
A student and friend of Serina from elementary school. She accidentally hit Anna with a basketball once in her second year, angering Serina. She later apologizes to Anna. She joins Anna and Kyotaro as their classmate in their third year.
Mr. Maeda (前田先生, Maeda-sensei)
Voiced by: Kenji Nomura (Japanese); Joe Daniels (English)
Class 2-3's homeroom teacher and a PE teacher.
Yumiko Ichikawa (市川 由美子, Ichikawa Yumiko)
Voiced by: Chinami Nishimura (Japanese); Shelley Calene-Black (English)
Kyotaro and Kana's mother.
Yuusaku Ichikawa (市川 優作, Ichikawa Yūsaku)
Voiced by: Yuto Nakano (Japanese); Scott Gibbs (English)
Kyotaro and Kana's father.
Nico Kouda (香田 ニコ, Kōda Nico)
Voiced by: Rio Tsuchiya
Anna's 19-year-old model colleague, who is also her stalker. She always laments the distance between her and Anna and thus strives to get more information from Anna's friends, much to Kyotaro's dismay. She owns a summer house in Kamakura, Kanagawa, as a means to reduce her tax payment.
Ms. Moriya (守屋先生, Moriya-sensei)
Voiced by: Kaori Nazuka (Japanese); Christina Kelly (English)
Class 3-1's homeroom teacher and also PE teacher. Kyotaro sees her as a stereotypical annoying PE teacher with an overly competitive side to her.

== Production ==
=== Manga ===
Norio Sakurai has stated in an interview that she is a fan of idols, and that she enjoys daydreaming about how she would react if she were in the same class as her favorite idol. She was inspired by these thoughts and decided to create the manga and Anna. She stated that she was thinking about herself when creating Kyotaro. Sakurai decided to call the chapters "karte" to emphasize that Kyotaro's chūnibyō condition improves after his interactions with Anna.

=== Anime ===
Producer Kazuki Endo found the manga interesting after reading the second and third volumes and sent a proposal to the editors of Akita Shoten for an anime adaptation. Editor Keita Takakashi stated in an interview that Endo's enthusiasm for the project was one of the main factors in his acceptance of the proposal. Endo approached Jukki Hanada for the script, and Hanada, who was already familiar with the manga, immediately accepted the offer. Endo chose Kensuke Ushio as the anime's composer, as he had enjoyed his soundtrack for A Silent Voice. To compose the anime's soundtrack, Ushio traveled to his hometown and recorded the route he used to go to school as a child. Director Hiroaki Akagi focused on the colors to reflect the emotions and changes in the characters. With Sakurai's permission, he slightly changed the seating arrangements in the classroom for the anime.

Shun Horie, Kyotaro's Japanese voice actor, stated that at the audition stage, he thought Kyotaro would be played by a voice actress, so when he was chosen for the role, he was genuinely surprised and confused. To get as close as possible to the voice of a real teenage boy, Horie watched videos of elementary school boys on YouTube.

== Media ==
=== Manga ===
The series is written and illustrated by Norio Sakurai. It started serialization in Akita Shoten's Weekly Shōnen Champion magazine on March 8, 2018. On April 10, 2018, the series was transferred to the Champion Cross manga website. On July 10, 2018, Akita Shoten merged Champion Cross with Champion Tap! to form their newly created manga website, Manga Cross. When the websites merged, the manga was transferred to Manga Cross, which was re-launched as Champion Cross in April 2024. The series ended serialization on September 15, 2026. Its chapters were collected into 14 tankōbon volumes.

In December 2020, Seven Seas Entertainment announced they licensed the series for English publication. The series is also licensed by Tong Li Publishing in Taiwan. Individual chapters of the series are called kartes.

A spin-off manga written and illustrated by Haika Nanasaka, titled The Dangers in My Heart: The Romantic Comedy Won't Start (僕の心のヤバイやつ ラブコメディが始まらない, Boku no Kokoro no Yabai Yatsu Rabukomedi ga Hajimaranai), began serialization on the same website on July 22, 2025. The series focuses on the character Kana Ichikawa. The chapters have been collected into two tankōbon volumes as of November 2026. In May 2026, Seven Seas Entertainment announced that they had also licensed The Romantic Comedy Won't Start for English publication in January 2027.

=== Anime ===
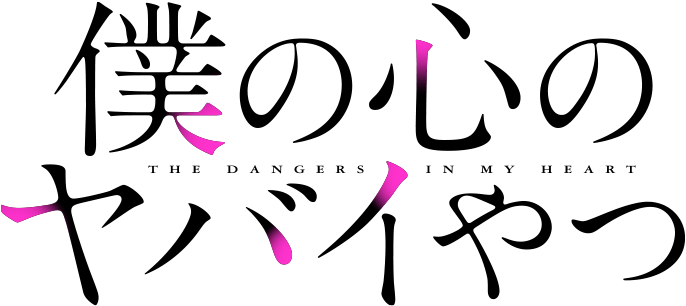
Logo for the anime TV series

In August 2022, it was announced that the manga would receive an anime television series adaptation. The series is produced by Shin-Ei Animation and directed by Hiroaki Akagi, with scripts written by Jukki Hanada, character designs handled by Masato Katsumata, and music composed by Kensuke Ushio. It aired from April 2 to June 18, 2023, on the NUMAnimation programming block on TV Asahi and its affiliates. The opening theme is "Shayō" (斜陽; 'Setting Sun') performed by Yorushika, while the ending theme is "Sū Sentimental" (数センチメンタル; 'A Few Sentimental') performed by Kohana Lam. At Anime NYC 2022, Sentai Filmworks announced that they licensed the series and is streaming it on Hidive. Plus Media Networks Asia to carried the anime in Southeast Asia, to be premiered on Aniplus Asia. In the United Kingdom and Ireland, Anime Limited released the first season with a collector's edition on January 19, 2026, while a standard edition was released on March 30, 2026.

On December 10, 2023, an animated collection of shorts based on the spin-off series posted on the author's Twitter account, titled "Twi-Yaba", was released in a standalone episode with the official English title of "Bonus Dangers". The shorts within the special last a few minutes each. Each short contains either a standalone gag, view into their daily lives, or a holiday special.

External videos
- The opening animation of the second season directed by Tetsurō Araki, featuring Atarayo's "Boku wa..."

A second season was announced after the airing of the twelfth episode, and aired from January 7 to March 31, 2024, on the same programming block. The opening theme is "Boku wa..." (僕は...; "I Am..."), performed by Atarayo, while the ending theme is "Koi Shiteru Jibun Sura Aiserunda" (恋してる自分すら愛せるんだ; "I Can Even Love My Loving Self"), performed by Kohana Lam. The opening animation is storyboarded and directed by Tetsurō Araki, who is known for directing the anime series Attack on Titan, and produced with the assistance from Wit Studio. (Note: Information is taken from the ending credits of each episode.) Some scenes take place at Meguro Station and Senzoku Station.

A compilation film version with extra footage was announced during the "Fan Kansha Kikaku!! TV Anime Boku no Kokoro no Yabai Yatsu Furikaeri Jōei-kai ~Bokura wa Futatabi Atsumatta" event on September 29, 2024. The theme song of the film is "Madder" (茜, akane), performed by Yorushika. The film premiered in Japanese theaters on February 13, 2026, distributed by Toei Company, Ltd. and Avex Pictures.

On March 14, 2026, a third season of the anime series was announced at a staff stage greeting event. It is set to premiere in April 2027.

=== Light novel ===
A spin-off light novel written by Kota Nozomi with illustrations by Sakurai and sune, titled The Dangers in My Heart – The Novel (小説 僕の心のヤバイやつ, Shōsetsu Boku no Kokoro no Yabai Yatsu), was released under Media Factory's MF Bunko J imprint on September 25, 2024.

During their panel at Anime NYC 2025, Seven Seas Entertainment announced that they had licensed the light novel for English publication in July 2026. The book was released digitally on June 4, 2026, while the paperback edition was released on July 21 of the same year.

== Reception ==
=== Manga ===
In 2019, the series ranked fourth in the Next Manga Awards in the web manga category. In 2020, the series ranked first in the same category. The series ranked third in the 2020 Kono Manga ga Sugoi! guidebook. It also ranked fourth in the fourth Tsutaya Comic Awards. It ranked thirteenth in Japanese bookstore Honya Club's employee recommendations. It was also nominated for the Manga Taishō in 2020. It ranked fourth in a 2020 poll asking people what manga they most wanted to see adapted into an anime. It ranked first in the same poll in 2021.

By September 2023, the manga had over 3 million copies in circulation.

=== Anime ===
In June 2023, TV Asahi announced during their end-of-year fiscal results that the anime adaptation had recorded the highest global sales for an anime program in the NUMAnimation programming block.

The series has gone on to receive widespread critical acclaim for its writing, characters, emotional depth, and art style. In Anime News Network Spring 2023 anime preview guide, James Beckett said that the series premiere was "irritatingly good" and said his defenses crumbled due to the series' "relentless onslaught of cuteness", calling it "absurdly freaking cute", but hoped that Kyotaro's pension for murder was toned down, while Rebecca Silverman said the first episode blended good humor with an expected "warm emotional undercurrent" and comedic moments, and praised the plot for being "good enough", while criticizing the character designs. In contrast, Nicholas Dupree and Richard Eisenbeis were more critical. Dupree said the series was built upon "pure, undiluted cringe humor", noted that Kyotaro was an "uncompromisingly honest presentation of...an edgelord teenager" while noting that Anna was "pretty charming". Eisenbeis said that while the story and characters made sense and the animation was fine, he said that the series made him cringe, and said while the series had a "well-written protagonist" and great coming-of-age message, he would watch if it did not have "awkward humor".

Later, MrAJCosplay, in a review on the same site, listed the series as one of their favorite anime in 2023, arguing that the series was a "very simple slice-of-life story", with a satisfying slow-burn romance, with every episode having some importance or dramatic weight, and said they could not "wait to see how much further the lovable goofballs will go". In another review, they praised the series "immaculate production values and a very ambient soundtrack". The anime was ranked tenth in "The Top 10 Anime of 2024" by Anime News Network.

Reviews for Anime Feminist took a different perspective. Reviewing the first episode, Vrai Kaiser described it as mostly "harmless-to-charming school rom-com shenanigans" when Kyotaro's murder fantasies faded away, and said that they would give the series a "cautious wait-and-see" approach, saying it was not to their taste, comparing it to the "choppy start" of Teasing Master Takagi-san. After three episodes, Kaiser stated that their optimism was borne out, as the dynamic between Kyotaro and Anna was "sweet and accurate to the age group". However, they noted the series' handling of sex would be "hit-or-miss for some audiences". Kaiser also argued that the series had "stumbling blocks" in the first season, but that it ended in a "really nice place" and on a "really beautiful place of feeling", and with an appealing "element of naturalness". However, another post on the site gave the series a "yellow flag" for some early monologues by Kyotaro, arguing they "veer too close to actual violent misogyny".

Alan Moody of THEM Anime Reviews reviewed the first season. He said that while Kyotaro resembled Nishikata from Teasing Master Takagi-san, Kyotaro was a loner and his "countenance is mildly creepy", while arguing that Anna differed from Takagi, as she was "statuesque, towering over Kyotaro". He also said that the series comedic timing was "nearly perfect", and that while the series was not "intellectually astute as Takagi-san, the cast...make up for much of that by their charm". He further added that due to the "mild sexual innuendo" in the series, it had mature themes as a result, while Hidive said the series was TV-14, and noted that Lovely Complex was a similar series, and noted the spinoff Twi-Yaba as a related series.

The second season of the anime adaptation became the first anime in the history of the anime polling sites Anime Corner and Anime Trending to be ranked first for an entire season. The season was nominated for Best Romance and Best Slice of Life categories at the 9th Crunchyroll Anime Awards in 2025.
