= Norio Sakurai =

Japanese manga artist

Norio Sakurai (Japanese: 桜井のりお, Hepburn: Sakurai Norio) is a Japanese manga artist. She is best known as the creator of Mitsudomoe, Rororro!, Kodomo Gakkyū, and her most successful series, The Dangers in My Heart. In 2010, Mitsudomoe was adapted into a TV anime. In 2023, The Dangers in My Heart was also adapted into a TV anime. A subsequent season released in 2024.

She was born in Ageo, Saitama Prefecture.

== Works ==
- Kodomo Gakkyū (2003–2005)
- Mitsudomoe (2006–2017)
- Rororro! (2016–2020)
- The Dangers in My Heart (2018–2026)

== Awards ==
- 2003 Akatsuka Award
- 2003 Rookie of the Year Award (Weekly Shōnen Champion)
- 2020 Next Manga Award
