= List of Whisper Me a Love Song episodes =

Whisper Me a Love Song is a 2024 anime television series directed by Akira Mano, and produced by Cloud Hearts and Yokohama Animation Laboratory. Hiroki Uchida oversaw the series scripts, Minami Yoshida designed the characters, and Hiroshi Sasaki and Wataru Maeguchi composed the music. The twelve episodes are adapted from the manga series of the same name written and illustrated by Eku Takeshima. The series follows Himari Kino and Yori Asanagi, two high school girls, after Himari's confession of admiration for Yori's singing leads to a romantic misunderstanding.

The series, initially scheduled for January 2024 but delayed due to "various circumstances", aired the first ten episodes from April 14 to June 30, 2024, on the NUMAnimation programming block on all ANN affiliates, including TV Asahi, (Note: TV Asahi listed the series premiere at 25:30 on April 13, 2024, which is effectively April 14 at 1:30 a.m. JST.) with the remaining two episodes airing on December 29 of the same year, following production delays. The Blu-ray Disc release, originally slated for four volumes released between September 13 and December 13, 2024, were delayed and later cancelled due to internal circumstances.

The opening theme song is "Follow your arrows", performed by the anime's band SSGIRLS with vocals by Kana Sasakura. The ending theme song for episodes 2-6 is "Giftee" (ギフティー, Gifutī), performed by Hana Shimano, while the ending theme for episode 8 onwards is "Meritocracy" (メリトクラシー, Meritokurashī), performed by the anime's band Laureley with vocals by Sui Mizukami. Sentai Filmworks licensed the series in North America, Australia and the British Isles for streaming on Hidive.

== Episodes ==
No.	Title (Note: All English titles are taken from HIDIVE.)	Directed by (Note: Information is taken from the ending credits of each episode.)	Written by	Storyboarded by	Original release date
1	"The Rooftop, a Guitar, and Senpai."; Transliteration: "Okujō to, Gitā to, Senpai to." (Japanese: 屋上と、ギターと、先輩と。)	Nobuhiro Mutō; Yuka Hashimoto	Hiroki Uchida	Xin Ya Cai	April 14, 2024
On her first day of high school, Himari Kino attends a freshman reception performance by school band SSGIRLS and becomes awestruck by their temporary vocalist, Yori Asanagi. Following the performance, Himari comes across Yori and tells her that she fell in love at first sight. Interpreting this as a confession, Yori finds herself falling in love with Himari at first sight herself. Spurred on by her friends, Yori meets Himari on the school roof and responds to her confession, only to discover Himari's "love at first sight" was not the romantic kind and she was just a fan of her music. Despite this, Yori becomes determined to make Himari fall for her for real and starts regularly meeting her on the rooftop so she can listen to her sing.
2	"Love, a Date, and..." Transliteration: "Suki, Dēto, Soshite..." (Japanese: 好き、デート、そして…)	Shinya Kawabe	Hiroki Uchida	Reika Amane	April 21, 2024
When rain makes meeting up on the roof impossible, Himari comes over to Yori's class to make different plans for after school, coming across SSGIRLS' bassist Aki Mizuguchi along the way. Himari invites Yori out on a date to the shopping mall during the weekend, the news of which surprises Aki when Yori tells her about it. During the date, Himari speaks of her admiration of Yori's singing on stage, leading Yori to consider doing it again. At the end of the date, Yori tells Himari upfront that she wants to date her for real. Himari, realising that Yori's previous confession of love at first sight was serious, worries that her own love is different.
3	"Confession and Hesitation."; Transliteration: "Kokuhaku to, Tomadoi to." (Japanese: 告白と、戸惑いと。)	Aya Kawamura	Nami Otomo	Harume Kosaka	April 28, 2024
Having never experienced romantic love before, Himari becomes conflicted about how to respond to Yori's confession and turns to her best friend and Aki's younger sister Miki for advice. Later, Himari's mother tells Himari about how she and her father started dating, stating that she initially turned him down when he first confessed but eventually fell in love with him. The next day, Himari tells Yori that she wants to spend more time with her to see if she will develop romantic feelings before deciding whether or not to date her. Wanting to make Himari fall for her for real, Yori asks SSGIRLS to let her join as an official member of their band.
4	"Progress, Impatience, and a Quiet Resolve."; Transliteration: "Shinten to, Aseri to, Shizuka na Ketsui." (Japanese: 進展と、焦りと、静かな決意。)	Yoshihide Ibata	Momoka Toyoda	Namato Unno	May 5, 2024 (Note: This episode aired at 2:00 a.m. JST, 30 minutes after the original air time on TV Asahi.)
As Yori begins practising with SSGIRLS in preparation for the Light Music Club concert, Himari, needing a way to pass the time on days when she cannot meet up with Yori, decides to join the Cooking Club, led by 2nd year student Momoka Satomiya. When Himari reports the news to Yori, Yori starts to feel jealous from hearing her talk about Momoka, which Aki is quick to pick up on. The next day, as Himari comes over to Miki's house, Aki, frustrated with Himari putting off giving Yori a proper answer indefinitely, tells her that she is in love with Yori romantically and is willing to take her if Himari is not.
5	"Going Home, a Meeting, and a Promise."; Transliteration: "Kaerimichi, Deai to, Yakusoku." (Japanese: 帰り道、出会いと、約束。)	Shinya Kawabe	Takahito Ōnishi	Naoto Hosoda	May 12, 2024
Following Aki's warning that she cannot hold off on answering Yori forever, Himari gets some advice from Momoka, telling her that there may already be feelings of love inside her. Later, as Himari and Yori walk home together, Yori's jealousy rises up again when Momoka comes to return Himari's phone. After the two talk with each other about their worries, Yori tells Himari to give her answer after the Light Music Club concert, where she hopes to make her fall for her. Another day, as Yori finishes writing the song she wants to perform, Himari comes over to meet the SSGIRLS, where she feels jealousy from Yori and Aki's interactions. As Yori and Himari makes plans to shop for accessories for the concert, Momoka receives tickets for the concert from her friend, SSGIRLS' former vocalist Shiho Izumi.
6	"Love at First Sight and the Big Day."; Transliteration: "Hitomebore to, Yakusoku no Hi." (Japanese: ひとめぼれと、約束の日。)	Nobuhiro Mutō	Hiroki Uchida	Kazuya Murata	May 19, 2024
Himari and Yori go shopping for clothes they want each other to wear for the concert, after which Himari buys Yori some earrings for her performance. On the day of the concert, Yori sings the song she had written for Himari, expressing her love for her. After hearing the song, Himari finally comes to realisation that she is in love with Yori and agrees to go out with her. Later, as SSGIRLS learn they must undergo auditions to take part in the upcoming school festival, they run up against Shiho, who shows hostility towards both Aki and Yori.
7	"The Past, a Song, and a Secret."; Transliteration: "Kako to, Uta to, Himitsu." (Japanese: 過去と、歌と、秘密。)	Unknown	Hiroki Uchida	TBA	May 26, 2024
Himari ends up meeting Shiho when she shows up at the cooking club, revealing she is in a band alongside Momoka and their mutual friend Hajime Amasawa. Meanwhile, Yori comes over to Aki's house to ask her about what happened between her and Shiho. Shiho, who had been kicked out of multiple groups because they did not like her attitude, was invited by Aki to form a band with her. Then suddenly one day, Shiho quit the band after fighting with Aki over not taking the band seriously, claiming that she had wanted to quit the entire time. On the day of the auditions, after SSGIRLS gives a well-received performance, Shiho's band Laureley gives a performance that blows everyone away. Afterwards, Shiho confronts Aki, telling her that she knows about her crush on Yori.
8	"An Old Dream and a Friend."; Transliteration: "Katsute no Yume to, Tomodachi to." (Japanese: かつての夢と、友だちと。)	Madoka Yaguchi	Momoka Todoya	TBA	June 2, 2024
As Aki is left bewildered by Shiho's words, Yori suggests that the real reason Shiho left SSGIRLS may not be what she said it was. With Shiho remaining stubborn about her true reasons, Aki throws down a challenge that if SSGIRLS can get more votes than Laureley at the culture festival, Shiho must tell her the truth. After learning about the showdown from Yori, Himari comes across Shiho working at a café and asks about what made her decide to aim to become a professional musician. Long ago, Shiho, who was pursuing the violin, became friends with another violinist named Kyou. However, after losing to Kyou in a violin contest, Shiho became overwhelmed with jealousy and broke things off with Kyou, eventually becoming unable to play the violin anymore. Still unwilling to give up on music, Shiho decided to pick up guitar, which Kyou had given up on, in order to surpass her that way.
9	"A Plan, a Blunder, and a Commotion."; Transliteration: "Keikaku to, Shippai to, Haran to." (Japanese: 計画と、失敗と、波乱と。)	Sumika Takase	Namo Otomo	TBA	June 23, 2024
Believing that Aki and Shiho would be able to make up with each other if given the opportunity, Himari arranges a taste-testing session to get SSGIRLS and Laureley together. Upon learning that Himari and Yori are dating, however, Shiho suddenly adds a condition to her wager with Aki that Himari must become Laureley's manager until the day of the festival. Not wanting the wager to fall through, Himari agrees to the terms, with Shiho offering to grant her a request if she helps Laureley win. During the summer break, as the SSGIRLS get together to think up a new song to sing at the festival, Laureley make plans to take Himari with them to explain how they formed.
10	"Old Memories, Old Feelings."; Transliteration: "Ano Hi no Kioku, Ano Hi no Omoi." (Japanese: あの日の記憶、あの日の思い。)	Kenya Ueno	Takahito Ōnishi	Katsunori Shibata	June 30, 2024
Laureley take Hima to a cemetery, revealing that Kyou, the violinist Shiho mentioned before, was Hajime's older sister who recently died in a sudden accident. Having felt relieved that she did not have to compete with her anymore, Shiho started regular coming to Kyou's grave to talk to about her band life. After Shiho broke up with SSGIRLS, she was approached by Momoka, who was Kyou's girlfriend, who urged her not to quit music as it reminded her of Kyou. Upon hearing about how Kyou truly felt about her music, Shiho, realizing she could not quit music after all, had Momoka and Hajime form a band with her with the goal of becoming pros. Later, as Himari tells Yori about this, she notices these new details conflict with Shiho's reason for quitting SSGIRLS and do not explain why she is hostile towards Yori. When pressed by Himari over why she hates Yori so much, Shiho explains that the first person she fell in love with was already in love with Yori, leading Himari to deduce that the one Shiho was in love with was Aki. Reminded of the heartbreak she felt, Shiho becomes determined to put a proper end to things.
11	"Confrontation and Differences."; Transliteration: "Taiji to, Kakechigai." (Japanese: 対峙と、かけ違い。)	Akira Mano; Kenya Ueno	Takahito Ōnishi	Minoru Yamaoka	December 29, 2024 (Note: Episodes 11 and 12 premiered back-to-back, and aired 15 mins later after the original air time on TV Asahi.)
Shiho tells Himari that she intends to stop getting involved with Aki completely after the school festival. On the first day of the festival, after spending some time with Yori and visiting her class' cosplay cafe, Himari follows Aki's request to bring Shiho to talk with her ahead of the concert. Angered by Aki's suggestion that they return to being friends, Shiho reveals to Aki that she was in love with her and could not stand being around the one who broke her heart. As Shiho realises she had not fully gotten over Aki, she gives a powerful performance alongside Laureley, bidding farewell to her first love.
12	"A Song For You."; Transliteration: "Kimi ni Todoketai Uta." (Japanese: 君に届けたい唄。)	Masahiko Suzuki	Takahito Ōnishi	Akira Mano	December 29, 2024
Having learned of Shiho's feelings for her, Aki feels conflicted over how she can still be with Shiho while still harboring feelings for Yori, leading her to ponder what her current feelings for Yori are. The next day, after Yori helps her to confirm what those feelings are, Aki proposes a last-minute change to SSGIRLS' setlist for their performance. When Shiho goes missing just before SSGIRLS' turn on stage, Himari manages to find her on the rooftop and drags her to the performance. At the end of their performance, Aki tells Shiho that her feelings for Yori have changed and expresses her desire to start things anew with Shiho before singing a song that they used to play together. After being pushed by Kyou to not repeat her past mistakes, Shiho finally makes up with Aki, later expressing her desire to be more than friends with her. Meanwhile, Himari and Yori spend the rest of the evening on the rooftop where they reconfirm their love for each other.
