= List of Whisper Me a Love Song chapters =

Whisper Me a Love Song is a Japanese manga series written and illustrated by Eku Takeshima. The series follows high school girls Himari Kino and Yori Asanagi after Himari's confession of admiration for Yori's singing leads to a romantic misunderstanding.

The manga has been serialized in Ichijinsha's Comic Yuri Hime since its April 2019 issue. It has been collected into thirteen tankōbon volumes as of November 2026. The series is licensed in English by Kodansha Comics, which has published eleven volumes as of May 2026.

== Volumes ==
No.	Original release date	Original ISBN	English release date	English ISBN
1	June 18, 2019	978-4-7580-7950-1	October 20, 2020	978-1-64651-115-0
1. ”The Roof, a Guitar, & Senpai." (屋上と、ギターと、先輩と。, Okujō to, gitā to, senpai to.); 2. ”First Love, Cherry Blossoms, & Kouhai." (初恋と、桜と、後輩と。, Hatsukoi to, sakura to, kōhai to.); 3. ”Their Time Together After Class." (放課後、2人の時間。, Hōkago, 2-ri no jikan.); 4. ”A Classroom on a Rainy Day." (雨の日、教室で。, Ame no hi, kyōshitsu de.); 5. ”Love, a Date, and Then..." (好き、デート、そして…, Suki, dēto, soshite…); "Bonus Comic" (おまけ, Omake)
2	January 17, 2020	978-4-7580-2074-9	December 22, 2020	978-1-64651-146-4
6. “Confessions and Hesitations.” (告白と、戸惑いと。, Kokuhaku to, tomadoi to.); 7. “The Roof, Senpai, & My Feelings.” (屋上と、先輩と、私の気持ち。, Okujō to, senpai to, watashi no kimochi.); 8. “Clubrooms, Classmates, & My Vow.” (部室と、同級生と、私の決意。, Bushitsu to, dōkyūsei to, watashi no ketsui.); 9. “First Day & Fun Times.” (初めてと、楽しさと。, Hajimete to, tanoshisa to.); 10. “Development, Fear, & A Quiet Choice.” (進展と、焦りと、静かな決意。, Shinten to, aseri to, shizukana ketsui.); “Bonus Comic” (おまけ, Omake)
3	July 17, 2020	978-4-7580-2135-7	June 22, 2021	978-1-64651-147-1
11. “Hesitation and Redux.” (戸惑い、再び。, Tomadoi, futatabi.); 12. “The Road Home, A Meeting, & A Promise.” (帰り道、出会いと、約束。, Kaerimichi, deai to, yakusoku.); 13. “Club Room, Pleased to Meet You, & Unknown Pain.” (部室、初めましてと、知らない痛み。, Bushitsu, hajimemashite to, shiranai itami.); 14. “A Second Date & Thank You.” (2度目のデートと、ありがとう。, 2-Dome no dēto to, arigatō.); 15. “Love at First Sight & Finally, the Day Arrives.” (ひとめぼれと、約束の日。, Hitomebore to, yakusoku no hi.); “Bonus Comic” (おまけ, Omake)
4	January 18, 2021	978-4-7580-2201-9	October 26, 2021	978-1-64651-228-7
16. “The Roof, a Guitar, & Girlfriends.” (屋上と、ギターと、恋人と。, Okujō to, gitā to, koibito to.); 17. “Restart & Reunion.” (再始動と、再会と。, Saishidō to, saikai to.); 18. “A Sweet Cake & Another Meeting.” (甘いケーキと、もう一つの出会い。, Amai kēki to, mōhitotsu no deai.); 19. “A Movie, a Date, & a Bit Off.” (映画と、デートと、すれ違い。, Eiga to, dēto to, surechigai.); 20. “The Past, a Song, & a Secret.” (過去と、歌と、秘密。, Kako to, uta to, himitsu.)
5	September 17, 2021	978-4-7580-2294-1	July 19, 2022	978-1-64651-398-7
21. “Distress, Regret, & What’s Next.” (動揺と、後悔と、これから。, Dōyō to, kōkai to, korekara.); 22. “Memories, Truth, & Trust.” (思い出と、真実と、信頼。, Omoide to, shinjitsu to, shinrai.); 23. “Support, Reluctance, & Resolve.” (応援と、戸惑いと、決心。, Ōen to, tomadoi to, kesshin.); 24. “A Small Hope & Her Dream.” (小さな望みと、彼女の夢。, Chīsana nozomi to, kanojo no yume.); 25. “The Dream She Once Had & Her Friend.” (かつての夢と、友だちと。, Katsute no yume to, tomodachi to.); 26. “Plan, Failure, & Trouble.” (計画と、失敗と、波乱と。, Keikaku to, shippai to, haran to.); “Bonus Comic” (おまけ, Omake)
6	April 18, 2022	978-4-7580-2397-9	December 6, 2022	978-1-64651-617-9
27. ”A Choice, Welcome, & Manager.” (選択と、歓迎と、マネージャー。, Sentaku to, kangei to, manējā.); 28. ”Selfishness & Heart of Hearts.” (わがままと、本音と。, Wagamama to, hon'ne to.); 29. ”Practice, Manager, & a Secret.” (練習と、マネージャーと、秘密。, Renshū to, manējā to, himitsu.); 30. ”Jealousy, A Song, & A Kiss.” (嫉妬と、歌と、キスと。, Shitto to, uta to, kisu to.); 31. ”Summer Festival & Wavering Feelings.” (夏休みと、ゆれる気持ち。, Natsuyasumi to, yureru kimochi.); “Bonus Comic” (おまけ, Omake)
7	January 18, 2023	978-4-7580-2491-4	January 30, 2024	978-1-64651-741-1
32. ”A Lovers’ Kiss & After…” (恋人のキスと、それから…, Koibito no kisu to, sorekara…); 33. ”New Song, Idea, & Memories.” (新曲と、アイディアと、想い出と。, Shinkyoku to, aidia to, omoide to.); 34. ”The Past, Resolve, & A Curse.” (過去と、決意と、呪い。, Kako to, ketsui to, noroi.); 35. ”Feelings Examined & One Last Secret.” (気持ちの整理と、最後のホンネ。, Kimochi no seiri to, saigo no hon'ne.); “Bonus Comic” (おまけ, Omake)
8	July 18, 2023	978-4-7580-2578-2	March 26, 2024	978-1-64651-917-0
36. ”Old Memories, Old Feelings.” (あの日の記憶、あの日の想い。, Ano ni~Tsu no kioku, ano ni~Tsu no omoi.); 37. ”New Term, Regrets, & A New Song.” (新学期と、後悔と、新曲と。, Shin gakki to, kōkai to, shinkyoku to.); “Bonus Comic” (おまけ, Omake); 38. ”Festival, A Date, And Then…” (お祭り、デート、そして…, Omatsuri, dēto, soshite…); 39. ”Confrontation & Talking Past Each Other.” (対峙と、かけ違い。, Taiji to, kake-chigai); 40. ”Truth & First Love.” (真実と、初恋と。, Shinjitsu to, hatsukoi to.); “Bonus Comic” (おまけ, Omake)
9	March 18, 2024	978-4-7580-2694-9; 978-4-7580-2695-6 (SE)	September 16, 2025	979-8-88877-399-4
41. "My Feelings & One More Try." (私の気持ちと、最後の挑戦。, Watashi no kimochi to, saigo no chōsen.); 42. "The Roof, Senpai, & One More Wish." (祭りの終わりと、最後の願い。, Matsuri no owari to, saigo no negai.); 43. "The Song I Send to You." (君にとどけたい唄, Kimi ni todoketai uta); 44. "Festival's End & Their Feelings." (祭りの終わり、それぞれの想い。, Matsuri no owari, sorezore no omoi.)
10	July 29, 2024	978-4-7580-2742-7; 978-4-7580-2743-4 (SE)	November 18, 2025	979-8-88877-425-0
45. "After-party, Plans, & an Encounter." (打ち上げと、進路と、これからと。, Uchiage to, shinro to, korekara to.); 46. "True Feelings, an Apology, & What's Next." (本音と、謝罪と、これからと。, Hon'ne to, shazai to, korekara to.); 47. "Aquarium, a Date, and Then..." (水族館、デート、そして…, Suizokukan, dēto, soshite…); 47.5. "After the Date, with Her Girlfriend." (デートの後と、恋人と。, Dēto no ato to, koibito to.); 48. "A Stay-at-Home Date & What Follows." (おうちデートと、その先と。, O uchi dēto to, sono-saki to.); 48.5. "The Two of Them After That." (その後の二人。, Sonogo no futari.); 49. "Panic, Advice, Confession, and..." (焦りと、相談と、告白と…, Aseri to, sōdan to, kokuhaku to…)
11	June 27, 2025	978-4-7580-2926-1; 978-4-7580-2927-8 (SE)	May 19, 2026	979-8-88877-747-3
50. "Confessions, Bewilderment, & Sorrow." (告白と、戸惑いと、憂いと。, Kokuhaku to, tomadoi to, urei to.); 51. "Bewilderment, Lies, & Hesitation." (戸惑いと、嘘と、逡巡と。, Tomadoi to, uso to, shunjun to.); 52. "Attachment, Giving Up, & a Promise." (執着と、諦めと、約束と。, Shūchaku to, akirame to, yakusoku to.); 53. "Surprise, Doubt, & Tailing." (驚きと、疑惑と、尾行と。, Odoroki to, giwaku to, bikō to.); 54. "Pursuit, Confession, & Girlfriends." (追求と、白状と、恋人と。, Tsuikyū to, hakujō to, koibito to.); 55. "Double Date & Opening Up." (Wデートと、打ち明けと。, W dēto to, uchiake to.); 56. "Spreading Feelings & Certain Love." (滲む気持ちと、確かな想い。, Nijimu kimochi to, tashikana omoi.)
12	April 17, 2026	978-4-7580-9834-2; 978-4-7580-9835-9 (SE)	—	—
57. 冬服と、進路と、その先と。 (Fuyufuku to, shinro to, sono-saki to.); 58. パーティーと、惚気と、おせっかいと。 (Pātī to, noroke to, osekkai to.); 59. あいさつと、謝罪と、将来と。 (Aisatsu to, shazai to, shōrai to.); 60. 放課後と、テストと、音楽と。 (Hōkago to, tesuto to, ongaku to.); 60.5. すれ違いと、約束の日。 (Surechigai to, yakusoku no hi.); 61. バズと、歓喜と、戸惑いと。 (Bazu to, kanki to, tomadoi to.); 62. 説明と、想い出と、手紙と。 (Setsumei to, omoide to, tegami to.); 62.5. 電話と、報告と、恋人と。 (Denwa to, hōkoku to, koibito to.)
13	November 18, 2026	978-4-8251-0203-3; 978-4-8251-0204-0 (SE)	—	—

=== Chapters not yet in tankōbon format ===
These chapters have yet to be published in a tankōbon volume.

63. 焼肉と、報告と、未来と。 (Yakiniku to, hōkoku to, mirai to.)
64. 出会いと、別れと、後悔と。 (Deai to, wakare to, kōkai to.)
65. ごまかしと、練習と、不和と。 (Gomakashi to, renshū to, fuwa to.)
66. お風呂と、本音と、その先と。 (Ofuro to, hon'ne to, sono-saki to.)
