= Reira =

Reira is a Japanese given name. Notable people with the name include:

- Reira Iwabuchi (born 2001), Japanese snowboarder
- Reira Ushio (born 2002), Japanese singer-songwriter
