= Yoshinori Nakayama =

Japanese voice actor (born 1996)

- 中山 祥徳
- Born: July 2, 1996 (age 30)
- Occupation: Voice actor
- Years active: 2019–present
- Agent: Ancheri
- Known for: The Fragrant Flower Blooms with Dignity as Rintaro Tsumugi

Yoshinori Nakayama (中山 祥徳, Nakayama Yoshinori; born July 2, 1996) is a Japanese voice actor affiliated with Ancheri. He was previously affiliated with Link Plan, before moving to Ancheri, which had taken over Link Plan's voice acting division, in 2025. He is known for his role as Rintaro Tsumugi, the male lead of the anime television series The Fragrant Flower Blooms with Dignity.

== Filmography ==
=== Anime ===
2019

- How Heavy Are the Dumbbells You Lift?, Gym member (episode 10)

2020

- Diary of Our Days at the Breakwater, Handicraft club member (episode 12)
- Sleepy Princess in the Demon Castle, Senior Skeleton Leader (episode 1), Scaly Reindeer (episode 8)
- Warlords of Sigrdrifa, Citizen (episode 9)

2021

- So I'm a Spider, So What?, Elf 1

2022

- World's End Harem, Friend (episode 8)
- Black Rock Shooter: Dawn Fall, Educational Institution Soldier (episode 5)
- Black Summoner, Adventurer (episode 5)
- I'm the Villainess, So I'm Taming the Final Boss, Student (episode 1, episode 5), Participant (episode 9)
- I've Somehow Gotten Stronger When I Improved My Farm-Related Skills, Trader (episode 1)

2023

- The Reincarnation of the Strongest Exorcist in Another World, Servant B (episode 1), Necromancer (episode 6), Knight (episode 13)
- My Daughter Left the Nest and Returned an S-Rank Adventurer, Bandit (episode 1)
- The 100 Girlfriends Who Really, Really, Really, Really, Really Love You, Businessman A (episode 4)

2025

- The Fragrant Flower Blooms with Dignity, Rintaro Tsumugi
