= The Fragrant Flower Blooms with Dignity =

Japanese manga series by Saka Mikami

- First tankōbon volume cover, featuring Rintaro Tsumugi (left) and Kaoruko Waguri (right)

薫る花は凛と咲く (Kaoru Hana wa Rin to Saku)
- Genre: Romantic comedy
- Manga
- Written by: Saka Mikami
- Published by: Kodansha
- English publisher: NA: Kodansha USA
- Imprint: Shōnen Magazine Comics
- Magazine: Magazine Pocket
- Original run: October 20, 2021 – present
- Volumes: 24
- Anime television series
- Directed by: Miyuki Kuroki; Haruka Tsuzuki (Note: Series episode director (シリーズ演出).)
- Written by: Rino Yamasaki
- Music by: Moeki Harada
- Studio: CloverWorks
- Licensed by: Netflix (streaming rights)
- Original network: Tokyo MX, GYT, GTV, MBS, BS11, AT-X
- Original run: July 6, 2025 – September 28, 2025
- Episodes: 13
- icon

The Fragrant Flower Blooms with Dignity (Japanese: 薫る花は凛と咲く, Hepburn: Kaoru Hana wa Rin to Saku) is a Japanese manga series written and illustrated by Saka Mikami. It has been serialized on Kodansha's Magazine Pocket website and app since October 2021, and its chapters have been collected into 24 tankōbon volumes as of September 2026. The story follows a boy attending a delinquent-populated public high school in Minato, Tokyo, who encounters a small-statured girl from an elite, all-female private academy attended by members of noble families.

An anime television adaptation produced by CloverWorks aired from July to September 2025. Both the manga and anime have received widespread critical acclaim, particularly for their writing, characters, art style, voice performances, and emotional portrayal.

By December 2025, the series had over 10 million copies in circulation.

== Plot ==
Chidori student Rintaro Tsumugi attends to customer Kaoruko Waguri at his family's bakery. He is surprised that Kaoruko sees his kindness, and he later saves her from harassment by delinquents. Rintaro discovers to his shock that Kaoruko attends Kikyo Private Academy. They aspire to learn about each other as their friendship grows.

== Characters ==
=== Main ===
Rintaro Tsumugi (紬 凛太郎, Tsumugi Rintarō)
Voiced by: Yuma Uchida (PV), Yoshinori Nakayama (anime) (Japanese); Robbie Daymond (English)
A well-meaning, tall student from the all-boys Chidori Public High perceived by others as intimidating. He has low self-esteem, often assuming he would be seen as a delinquent due to his appearance and attitude. He works at his family's bakery, where he meets Kaoruko and is surprised that she sees his kindness rather than his intimidating appearance and school affiliation. Because of that he gradually and steadily falls in love with her. Since Kaoruko truly enjoys eating the cakes baked at his family's bakery shop, when the two start dating he tries to bake some for her in order to see her smile. He originally had a modest appearance in elementary school, but changed his reputation during his junior high school years. He later confesses his feelings to Kaoruko and they become a couple.
Kaoruko Waguri (和栗 薫子, Waguri Kaoruko)
Voiced by: Azumi Waki (PV), Honoka Inoue (anime) (Japanese); Bijou Vann (Note: Credited as Bijou Middlebrooks in episodes 1 and 2.) (English)
A beautiful, kind and caring young student from a humble family enrolled at the all-girls Kikyo Private Academy on a scholarship. She excels in her grades and is highly regarded by her peers. After meeting Rintaro one fateful night at his cake shop, when she was in distress he showed to her overwhelming kindness and consolation. She is a regular customer at the bakery and sees Rintaro's kindhearted nature rather than his intimidating looks, and falls in love with him right after discovering he goes to the school next to her. She is a glutton for the pastries at the bakery. Due to her small size, Rintaro initially mistook her for a junior high school student. She and Rintaro later start dating after they confess their feelings to each other.

=== Supporting ===
Shohei Usami (宇佐美 翔平, Usami Shōhei)
Voiced by: Kikunosuke Toya (Japanese); Aaron Yamawaki (English)
Rintaro's outgoing and energetic best friend and classmate. Ditzy at times, he is considerate and fosters a positive atmosphere among his friends. He has no grudge towards Kikyo students, and even wishes to date one of the girls, though he is often frustrated with how the girls treat the boys at Chidori.
Saku Natsusawa (夏沢 朔, Natsusawa Saku)
Voiced by: Koki Uchiyama (Japanese); Aaron Fors (English)
Rintaro's intelligent best friend and classmate who tutors Rintaro and Shohei for their exams. Handsome, introverted, and cynical, he makes sardonic remarks about people who mock his friends, though he has good intentions and has difficulty expressing his thoughts. Initially, he hates the Kikyo students with a passion, and is strictly against Rintaro seeing Kaoruko, which causes a temporary rift between them. However, once they reconcile, he begins warming up to the girls. He eventually falls in love with Subaru later on after spending time with her, but he chooses not to confess yet out of consideration for Subaru's discomfort around boys.
Ayato Yorita (依田 絢斗, Yorita Ayato)
Voiced by: Hiiro Ishibashi (Japanese); Skylar Silverlake (English)
Rintaro's good-natured and insightful best friend and classmate who he sometimes pokes fun at others, but does not hold back against those who hurt his friends. Proficient in self-defense; he tries to avoid resorting to violence, and dreams of becoming a police officer in the future. He appears to have a crush on Madoka, but has yet to confess to her.
Subaru Hoshina (保科 昴, Hoshina Subaru)
Voiced by: Aya Yamane (Japanese); Kelly Baskin (English)
Kaoruko's childhood best friend and classmate. She's usually timid and uncomfortable around boys due to being bullied in her past. She looks up to Kaoruko after she stood up for her and aims to do anything to protect her. Initially hostile to Rintaro and his friends, believing they might end up hurting Kaoruko, she warms up to them after learning of their kindness, eventually becoming close friends. She later develops feelings for Saku after spending time with him.
Kyoko Tsumugi (紬 杏子, Tsumugi Kyōko)
Voiced by: Yoko Hikasa (Japanese); Stacie Bongo (English)
Rintaro's mother who manages the bakery with her husband and deeply cares for Rintaro. She fully supports Rintaro's relationship with Kaoruko and is often there to give him advice.
Madoka Yuzuhara (柚原 円蚊, Yuzuhara Madoka)
Voiced by: Rio Tsuchiya (Japanese); Lena Lemon (English)
One of Kaoruko's classmates and closest friends at Kikyo. She's a fun-loving, compassionate and caring girl who harbors no ill sentiment towards Chidori students, being indifferent to the school rivalry. She becomes close with Rintaro and his friends, and like Subaru, can be protective of Kaoruko. She and Ayato form a particularly strong bond, but she appears to be unaware of his growing feelings for her.
Keiichiro Tsumugi (紬 圭一郎, Tsumugi Keīchirō)
Voiced by: Ryōtarō Okiayu (Japanese); Keith Silverstein (English)
Rintaro's father who is the humble head baker. Although usually lethargic from dedicating himself to his work, he also cares for Rintaro and helps him with learning how to bake.
Sotaro Tsumugi (紬 颯太郎, Tsumugi Sōtarō)
Rintaro's older brother who works as a hairdresser.
Fuko Waguri (和栗 風子, Waguri Fuko)
Kaoruko's mother.
Yosuke Waguri (和栗洋介, Waguri Yōsuke)
Kaoruko's father.
Kosuke Waguri (和栗康介, Waguri Kosuke)
Kaoruko's younger brother.

=== Other ===
Makoto Tsukada (塚田 慎, Tsukada Makoto)
Voiced by: Chikahiro Kobayashi (Japanese); Brick Patrick (English)
The attentive and considerate adviser of Rintaro's class.
Chisa Minamoto (源 千紗, Minamoto Chisa)
Voiced by: Marika Tachibana
Friend and classmate of Kaoruko.
Ayumi Sawatari (沢渡 亜由美, Sawatari Ayumi)
Voiced by: Saku Mizuno (Japanese); Deneen Melody (English)
Friend and classmate of Kaoruko.
Suzuka Asakura (浅倉 すずか, Asakura Suzuka)
Voiced by: Shino Shimoji (Japanese); Callie Walker (English)
Friend and classmate of Kaoruko.
Ayame Toki (土岐 菖蒲, Toki Ayame)
A strict and stern teacher who holds a negative view towards Chidori Public High.
Mio Natsusawa (夏沢 美緒, Natsusawa Mio)
Saku's younger sister.
Satsuki Nabata (菜畑 皐月, Nabata Satsuki)
A high school girl who was a classmate of Rintaro in middle school.
Reo Hidaka (飛鷹 怜央, Hidaka Reo)
A high school boy who was formerly acquainted with Saku as a friend and study partner.

== Production ==
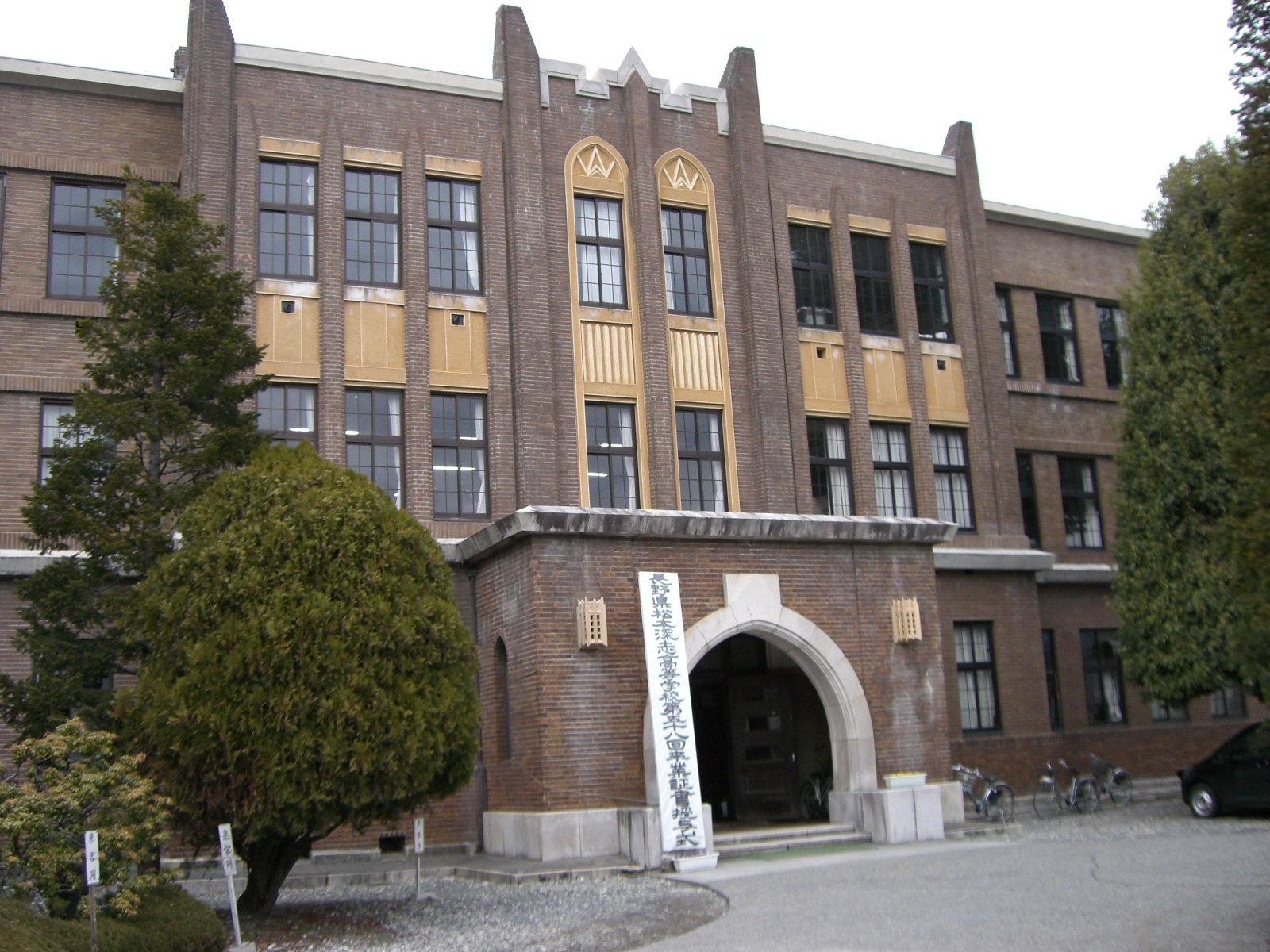
Matsumoto Fukashi Senior High School

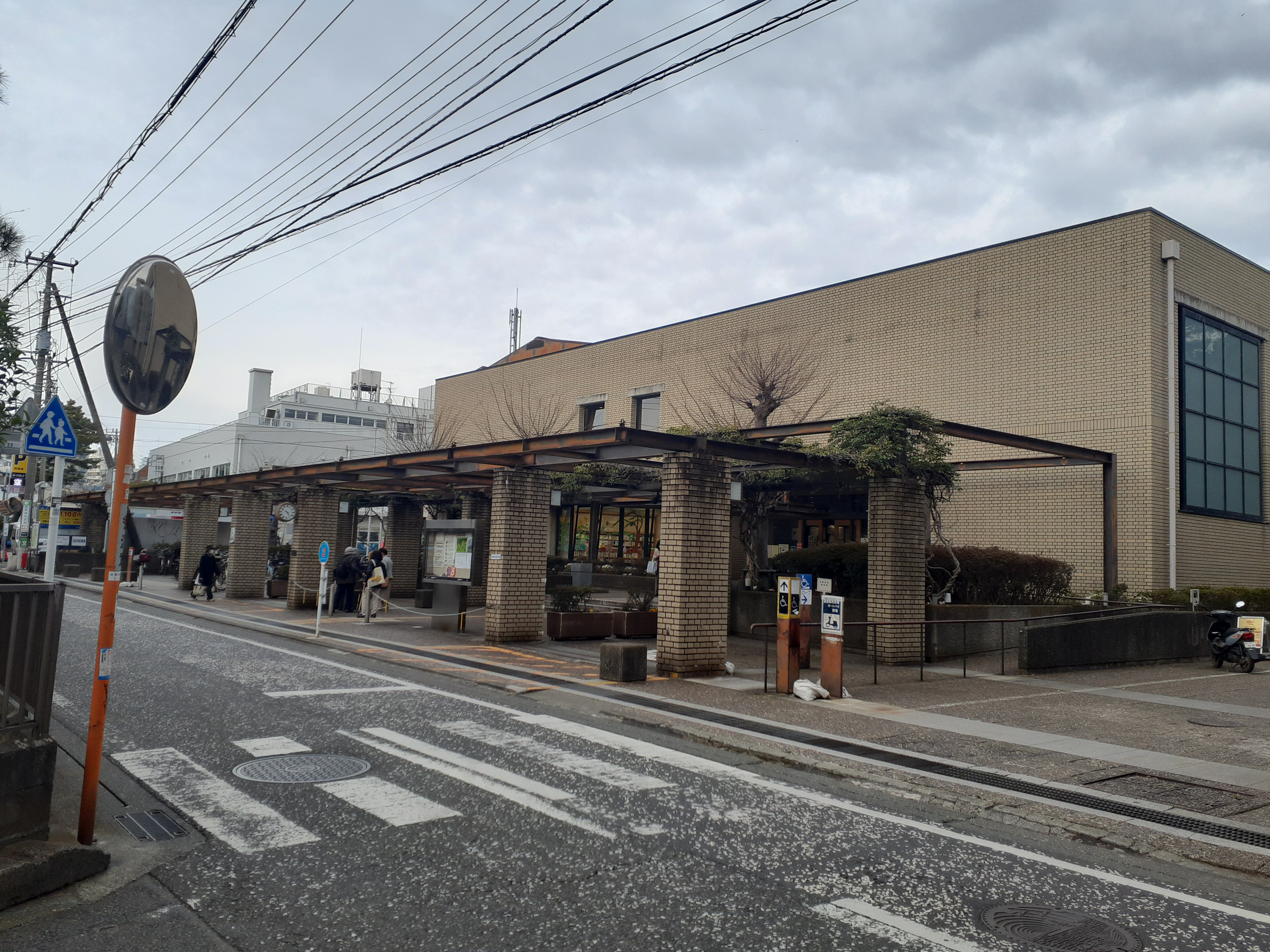
Chigasaki City Library

=== Planning ===
After winning the 105th Newcomer Manga Award for her one-shot manga Kurage no Uta (海月のうた; lit. 'Song of the Jellyfish'), author Saka Mikami's editor suggested her to create a manga series. Mikami wanted to draw a manga in which all the characters were kind. In an interview she stated that the second chapter was especially difficult to write, as her initial storyboards were rejected three times. Mikami had already decided in the first chapter that the boys' school and the girls' school wouldn't get along, but her editor suggested to make it a little more tense.

When designing the characters, Mikami started with their appearances. She explained that she likes couples with a large height difference, so she decided to make Rintaro tall and Kaoruko short. She was also unsure whether to make Kaoruko from a wealthy family; however, in the third chapter she decided to make her from an ordinary family. Because she likes contrasts, Mikami thought it would be a good idea to have Rintaro – who has a "scary face" – work in a family-owned cake shop.

=== Anime adaptation ===
Aniplex producer Shoko Hori, a longtime fan of the manga, said she loved the gentle world depicted in the manga. She wanted to somehow make it into an anime and consulted with her superior Kyoko Uryu. At that time, Kodansha introduced them to the idea of adapting the manga into a film. CloverWorks also expressed strong interest in producing an anime adaptation and, with the support of Uryu, the anime project was launched.

Although the place names in the manga series are fictional, the production team wanted to maintain a sense of realism, as they believed the depiction of everyday life was essential to the story. After consulting with Mikami, they went to scout the places she used as references when drawing the illustrations. For the model of the school, they visited Matsumoto Fukashi Senior High School in Nagano Prefecture, and for the model of the library, they visited Chigasaki City Library. Since Rintaro's family runs a cake shop, director Miyuki Kuroki recommended several shops that could serve as models, and they researched those shops. To ensure the cake-making process was portrayed accurately, they collaborated with the Tokyo Confectionery School and researched both the kitchen utensils and the cake-making methods.

== Media ==
=== Manga ===
Written and illustrated by Saka Mikami, The Fragrant Flower Blooms with Dignity began serialization on Kodansha's Magazine Pocket website and app on October 20, 2021. The series has been collected in 24 volumes as of September 2026.

Kodansha publishes the series in English on their K Manga service. At Anime Expo 2023, Kodansha USA announced that the series would be published in print starting in Q2 2024.

==== Volumes ====
No.	Original release date	Original ISBN	English release date	English ISBN
1	March 9, 2022	978-4-06-526609-0	June 4, 2024	979-8-88-877138-9
1. "Rintaro and Kaoruko" (凛太郎と薫子, Rintarō to Kaoruko); 2. "Chidori and Kikyo" (千鳥と桔梗, Chidori to Kikyō); 3. "Exam Crunch" (試験勉強, Shiken Benkyō); 4. "Kaoruko's Friend" (薫子の友達, Kaoruko no Tomodachi); 5. "Study Session" (勉強会, Benkyō-kai)
2	May 9, 2022	978-4-06-527851-2	August 6, 2024	979-8-88-877139-6
6. "Subaru Hoshina" (保科昴, Hoshina Subaru); 7. "Warmth of the Heart" (心の温度, Kokoro no Ondo); 8. "Their Friendship" (4人の友情, Yon-nin no Yūjō); 9. "Waguri-san's Existence" (和栗さんの存在, Waguri-san no Sonzai); 10. "Self-Loathing" (大嫌い, Daikirai); 11. "I Love You!" (大好き, Daisuki); 12. "Rintaro and Subaru" (凛太郎と昴, Rintarō to Subaru); 13. "Mother" (母さん, Kaa-san)
3	July 8, 2022	978-4-06-528386-8	October 8, 2024	979-8-88-877140-2
14. "My Beloved Place" (大好きな居場所, Daisuki na Ibasho); 15. "Coolest Guy Ever" (かっこいい男, Kakkoii Otoko); 16. "Sports Festival" (スポーツ大会, Supōtsu Taikai); 17. "Thawing" (雪解け, Yukidoke); 18. "Aquarium" (水族館, Suizokukan); 19. "The Meaning of These Feelings" (感情の正体, Kanjō no Shōtai); 20. "The Rainclouds Pass" (雨雲去る, Amagumo Saru); 21. "Blond Hair and Pierced Ears" (金髪とピアス, Kinpatsu to Piasu)
4	September 9, 2022	978-4-06-529144-3	December 3, 2024	979-8-88-877141-9
22. "A Mother's Feelings" (母の思い, Haha no Omoi); 23. "Six Person Study Group" (6人で勉強会, Roku-nin de Benkyō-kai); 24. "Beyond the Curtains" (カーテンの向こう側, Kāten no Mukō-gawa); 25. Early Summer Sorrows (初夏の悩み, Shoka no Nayami); 26. "Yorita and Rintaro" (依田と凛太郎, Yorita to Rintarō); 27. "Group Chat" (グループトーク, Gurūputōku); 28. "Waguri-san's Birthday" (和栗さんの誕生日, Waguri-san no Tanjōbi); 29. "July 22nd" (7月22日, Shichigatsu Nijūninichi)
5	November 9, 2022	978-4-06-529641-7	February 4, 2025	979-8-88-877142-6
30. "The Long-Awaited Birthday" (誕生日当日, Tanjōbi Tōjitsu); 31. "Impressions" (ケーキの感想, Kēki no Kansō); 32. "How to Spend a Summer Break" (夏休みの過ごし方, Natsuyasumi no Sugoshikata); 33. "Bewilderment at the Beachside" (海辺の惑い, Umibe no Madoi); 34. "I Want to Be Here" (ここにいたい, Koko ni Itai); 35. "Sparklers" (線香花火, Senkō Hanabi); 36. "I Like You" (好きです, Sukidesu); 37. "Summer Festival" (夏祭り, Natsu Matsuri)
6	January 6, 2023	978-4-06-530334-4	April 1, 2025	979-8-88-877143-3
38. "Rintaro's Feelings" (凛太郎の想い, Rintarō no Omoi); 39. "Confession" (告白, Kokuhaku); 40. "Kaoruko and Rintaro" (薫子と凛太郎, Kaoruko to Rintarō); 41. "The Morning After" (告白の翌朝, Kokuhaku no Yokuasa); 42. "Change" (変化, Henka); 43. "Shopping Together" (二人で買い物, Futari de Kaimono); 44. "Status Report" (報告, Hōkoku); 45. "Natsusawa's Birthday" (夏沢の誕生日, Natsusawa no Tanjōbi)
7	March 9, 2023	978-4-06-530959-9	June 3, 2025	979-8-88-877144-0
46. "Birthday Present" (誕生日プレゼント, Tanjōbi Purezento); 47. "Mio Natsusawa" (夏沢澪, Natsusawa Mio); 48. "Saku and Subaru" (朔と昴, Saku to Subaru); 49. "Beginnings of Friendship" (友情のきっかけ, Yūjō no Kikkake); 50. "Friends" (友達, Tomodachi); 51. "Grateful" (有り難い, Arigatai); 52. "Waguri-san's Part-Time Job" (和栗さんのアルバイト, Waguri-san no Arubaito); 53. "A Good Person" (いい人, Ii Hito)
8	May 9, 2023	978-4-06-531601-6	August 5, 2025	979-8-88-877145-7
54. "The Cake Reward" (ご褒美のケーキ, Gohōbi no Kēki); 55. "Waguri-san's Family" (和栗さんの家, Waguri-san no Ie); 56. "Showing Proof" (証明, Shōmei); 57. "Kosuke Waguri" (和栗洸介, Waguri Kōsuke); 58. "Sprouted Feelings" (芽生えた気持ち, Mebaeta Kimochi); 59. "Encounter" (鉢合わせ, Hachiawase); 60. "Kikyo and Chidori" (桔梗と千鳥, Kikyō to Chidori); 61. "Fantasy and Reality" (空想と現実, Kūsō to Genjitsu)
9	August 8, 2023	978-4-06-532607-7	October 7, 2025	979-8-88-877205-8
62. "Resolve" (覚悟, Kakugo); 63. "Cut from the Same Cloth" (似た者同士, Nitamono Dōshi); 64. "Precious Something" (重要なこと, Jūyōna Koto); 65. "Face-to-Face" (フェイス・トゥ, Feisu tu); 66. "Ayumi Sawatari" (沢渡亜由美, Sawatari Ayumi); 67. "A Failure" (だめな人, Damena Hito); 68. "Guiding Light" (憧れ, Akogare); 69. "The Same" (同じ, Onaji)
10	November 9, 2023	978-4-06-533508-6	December 9, 2025	979-8-88-877261-4
70. "Inside One's Chest" (胸の内, Mune no Uchi); 71. "Natsusawa's Past" (夏沢の過去, Natsusawa no Kako); 72. "Moving Forward" (前進, Zenshin); 73. "A Long Awaited Date" (久々のデート, Hisabisa no Dēto); 74. "Greeting" (挨拶, Aisatsu); 75. "Mother and Girlfriend" (母と彼女, Haha to kanojo); 76. "Gratitude" (感謝, Kansha); 77. "Just Having Fun" (ただ楽しく, Tada Tanoshiku)
11	January 9, 2024	978-4-06-534168-1	February 3, 2026	979-8-88-877303-1
78. "School Trip" (修学旅行, Shūgaku Ryokō); 79. "Memories of Their Journey" (旅の思い出, Tabi no Omoide); 80. "Subaru's Birthday" (昴の誕生日, Subaru no Tanjōbi); 81. "Rintaro's Older Brother" (凛太郎の兄, Rintarō no Ani); 82. "Sotaro and Rintaro" (颯太朗と凛太郎, Sōtarō to Rintarō); 83. "He'll Be Fine" (もう大丈夫, Mō Daijōbu); 84. "Rintaro's Worries" (凛太郎の気がかり, Rintarō no Kigakari); 85. "A Classmate from Middle School" (中学の同級生, Chūgaku no Dōkyūsei)
12	April 9, 2024	978-4-06-535156-7	April 7, 2026	979-8-88-877394-9
86. "Satsuki Nabata" (菜畑皐月, Nabata Satsuki); 87. "First Love and Broken Heart" (初恋と失恋, Hatsukoi to Shitsuren); 88. "Karaoke Party" (皆でカラオケ, Mina de Karaoke); 89. "Career Survey" (進路希望調査, Shinro Kibō Chōsa); 90. "Yorita's Future" (依田の将来, Yorita no Shōrai); 91. "What Must Be Told" (伝えるべきこと, Tsutaerubeki Koto); 92. "Rintaro and Yorita" (凛太郎と依田, Rintaro to Yorita); 93. "Christmas Helpers" (クリスマスヘルパー, Kurisumasu Herupā)
13	July 9, 2024	978-4-06-536120-7	June 9, 2026	979-8-88-877405-2
94. "Yorita's Past" (依田の過去, Yorita no kako); 95. "Meaningless" (意味がない, Imiganai); 96. "After Everything Is Resolved" (全てが解決した後, Subete ga Kaiketsu shita Nochi); 97. "What It Means to Work" (働くことの意味, Hataraku Koto no Imi); 98. "Yorita's Answer" (依田さんの回答, Yorita-san no Kaitō); 99. "Their Christmas" (彼らのクリスマス, Karera no Kurisumasu); 100. "Special to You" (あなたにとって特別な, Anata ni Totte Tokubetsuna)
14	October 9, 2024	978-4-06-537044-5	August 11, 2026	979-8-88-877522-6
101. "December 26th" (12月26日, Jūnigatsu Nijūninichi); 102. "Kaoruko's Present" (薫子のプレゼント, Kaoruko no Purezento); 103. "New Year's" (新年の, Shinnen no); 104. "Sotaro and Kaoruko" (宗太郎とかおるこ, Sōtarō to Kaoruko); 105. "A New Year, a New Term" (新年の新学期, Shinnen no Shin Gakki); 106. "Touring the Theme Park" (7人でテーマパーク, Nana-nin de Tēma Pāku); 107. "Rintaro's Birthday" (凛太郎の誕生日, Rintarō no Tanjōbi); 108. "Saku and Subaru's Study Session" (朔と昴の勉強会, Saku to Subaru no Benkyō-kai); 109. "The Courage to Move Forward" (前に進む勇気, Mae ni Susumu Yūki)
15	January 8, 2025	978-4-06-538053-6	October 13, 2026	979-8-88-877618-6
110. "Their Respective February" (それぞれの2月, Sorezore no Nigatsu); 111. "Valentine's Day" (バレンタイン, Barentain); 112. "To the Mock Exam" ((模試へ, Moshi e); 113. "Scars of the Heart" (心の古傷, Kokoro no Furukizu); 114. "Natsusawa and Hidaka" ((夏沢と飛鷹, Natsusawa to Hidaka); 115. "After the Mock Exam" (模試を終えて, Moshi o Oete); 116. "Horror Movie" (ホラー映画, Horā Eiga); 117. "The Pâtisserie from Back Then" (あの日のケーキ屋, Ano hi no Kēki-ya)
16	April 9, 2025	978-4-06-539040-5	December 22, 2026	979-8-88-877673-5
118. "Unequal Blessings" (もらってばかり, Moratte Bakari); 119. "Goal" (目標, Mokuhyō); 120. "Natsusawa's White Day" (夏沢のホワイトデー, Natsusawa no Howaitodē); 121. "Pâtissier" (パティシエ, Patishie); 122. "Entering the Third Year" (3年生, San-Nensei); 123. "Putting on a Brave Face" (平気なフリ, Heiki na Furi); 124. "Whining" (弱音, Yowane); 125. "Takoyaki Party" (たこ焼きパーティー, Takoyaki Pātī)
17	June 9, 2025	978-4-06-539745-9	February 23, 2027	979-8-88-877719-0
126. "Kaoruko's Father and Rintaro" (薫子の父と凛太郎, Kaoruko no Chichi to Rintarō); 127. "The Final Sports Festival" (3年のスポ大, San-nen no Supo-dai); 128. "A Kind Soul" (優しい人, Yasashii Hito); 129. "Kaoruko's Future" (薫子の将来, Kaoruko no Shōrai); 130. "Boyfriend" (彼氏, Kareshi); 131. "Obstetrician-Gynecologist" (産婦人科医, Sanfujinkai); 132. "Their Own Paths" (それぞれの進路, Sorezore no Shinro); 133. "Older Brother Usami" (長男の宇佐美, Chōnan no Usami)
18	August 7, 2025	978-4-06-540356-3	April 20, 2027	979-8-88-877860-9
134. "Subaru's Concerns" (昴の気がかり, Subaru no Kigakari); 135. "Final Exams of the First Term" (1学期期末試験, Ichi-gakki Kimatsu Shiken); 136. "A Day at the Zoo" (皆で動物園へ, Mina de Dōbutsuen e); 137. "Back at the Beach" (1年ぶりの海, Ichi-nen-buri no Umi); 138. "Pounding Feelings" (波打つ思い, Namiutsu Omoi); 139. "More Than Just a Friend" (「異性」として, "Isei" to shite); 140. "What Even Is Love?" (恋とは, Koi to wa); 141. "Words of Affection" (特別な言葉, Tokubetsuna Kotoba)
19	September 9, 2025	978-4-06-540813-1	—	—
142. "Visiting Kaoruko's Room" (薫子の部屋で, Kaoruko no Heya de); 143. "Parent-Teacher Meeting" (三者面談, Sanshamendan); 144. "Rintaro's Summer Break" (凛太郎の夏休み, Rintarō no Natsuyasumi); 145. "Rintaro's Path" (凛太郎の進路, Rintarō no Shinro); 146. "Unwinding" (リフレッシュ, Rifuresshu); 147. "Natsusawa's Path" (夏沢の進路, Natsusawa no Shinro); 148. "First Anniversary" (1年記念日, Ichi-nen Kinenbi); 149. "Job Interview" (面接, Mensetsu)
20	October 9, 2025	978-4-06-540814-8	—	—
150. "Girlfriend" (彼女, Kanojo); 151. "To the National Mock Exams" (全国模試へ, Zenkoku Moshi e); 152. "Evaluation" (評価, Hyōka); 153. "The Wall to Break Through" (越えるべき壁, Koerubeki Kabe); 154. "Kyoko and Keiichiro" (杏子と圭一郎, Kyōko to Keiichirō); 155. "Keiichiro and Kyoko" (圭一郎と杏子, Keīchirō to Kyōko); 156. "A Gentle Taste and a Sweet Scent" (優しい味と甘い匂い, Yasashii Aji to Amai Nioi)
21	December 9, 2025	978-4-06-541886-4	—	—
157. "This Year's Summer Festival" (1年ぶりの夏祭り, Ichinen Buri no Natsu Matsuri); 158. "Spark" (火花, Hibana); 159. "Discovery" (発覚, Hakkaku); 160. "Help" (助け, Tasuke); 161. "Resolution" (覚悟, Kakugo); 162. "Collision" (衝突, Shōtotsu); 163. "Allies" (仲間, Nakama); 164. "Tsukada-sensei" (塚田先生)
22	March 9, 2026	978-4-06-542955-6	—	—
165. "One-on-One" (対面, Taimen); 166. "As a Fellow Teacher" (同じ教師として, Onaji Kyōshi to Shite); 167. "Refreshing Guys" (気持ちのいいやつら, Kimochi no ī ya Tsura); 168. "Be Yourselves" (いつも通り, Itsumodōri); 169. "Kikyo's School Building" (桔梗の校舎, Kikyō no Kōsha); 170. "Discussion" (話し合い, Hanashiai); 171. "Plea" (懇願, Kongan); 172. "Ayame Toki" (土岐菖蒲, Toki Ayame)
23	June 9, 2026	978-4-06-543910-4	—	—
173. "Repentance" (悔恨, Kaikon); 174. "Trust and Determination" (信頼と覚悟, Shinrai to Kaku go); 175. "Cornerstone" (礎, Ishizue); 176. "Thank You" (ありがとう, Arigatō); 177. "Atonement" (贖罪, Shokuzai); 178. "Proclamation" (報告, Hōkoku); 179. "What Comes Next" (これからのこと, Korekara no Koto)
24	September 9, 2026	978-4-06-544948-6	—	—
180. "What We Like About You" (好きなところ, Sukina Tokoro); 181. "Piece by Piece" (積み重ね, Tsumikasane); 182. "Sharing the Burden" (分け合う, Wakeau); 183. "Becoming an Adult" (大人になったら, Otona ni Nattara); 184. "The Person Involved" (当事者, Tōjisha); 185. "Reunion" (再会, Saikai); 186. "Stitching Together" (綴る, Tsuzuru); 187. "To Where the Sun Reaches" (光の差す方へ, Hikari no Sasu Hō e)
25	December 9, 2026	978-4-06-546182-2	—	—

==== Chapters not yet in tankōbon format ====
These chapters have yet to be published in a tankōbon volume.

188. "For the First Time" (初めてのこと, Hajimete no Koto)
189. "The Path to Take" (歩む道, Ayumu Michi)
190. "Long-Awaited Time Together" (久々の時間, Hisabisa no Jikan)
191. "Stride" (足取り, Ashidori)
192. "Genuine Feelings" (本心, Honshin)
193. "Coming Closer" (寄り添い, Yorisoi)
194. "Consultation" (相談, Sōdan)
195. "My Rule" (マイルール, Mai Rūru)
196. "Kaoruko and Madoka" (薫子とまどか, Kaoruko to Madoka)
197. "Exam Results" (試験結果, Shiken Kekka)
198. "Their Time Together" (二人の時間, Futari no Jikan)
199. "The Hoshina Family's Dinner Table" (保科家の食卓, Hoshina-ke no Shokutaku)
200. "Your Smile" (あなたの笑顔, Anata no Egao)
201. "With All One’s Heart" (思いのたけ, Omoi no Take)
202. "As A Friend" (友達として, Tomodachi Toshite)
203. "Obliviousness" (鈍さ, Nibu-sa)
204. "Subaru and Saku" (昴と朔, Subaru to Saku)
205. "Saku’s Answer" (朔の答え, Saku no Kotae)
206. "What Happens Next" (この先のこと, Kono Saki no Koto)

=== Anime ===
An anime television series adaptation was announced during the Aniplex Online Fest event on September 16, 2024. The series was produced by CloverWorks and directed by Miyuki Kuroki, with Satoshi Yamaguchi as assistant director, series composition by Rino Yamasaki, character designs by Kohei Tokuoka, and music by Moeki Harada. It aired from July 6 to September 28, 2025, on Tokyo MX and other networks. (Note: Tokyo MX listed the series premiere on July 5, 2025, at 24:30, which is effectively July 6 at 12:30 a.m. JST.) The opening theme song is "Manazashi wa Hikari" (まなざしは光; Your Gaze, Crepuscular), performed by Tatsuya Kitani, and the ending theme song is "Hare no Hi ni" (ハレの日に; lit. 'On This Sunny Day'), performed by Reira Ushio. The special ending theme song "Hitohira" (ひとひら), performed by Hitomi Miyahara, is used for the thirteenth and final episode. Netflix is streaming the series globally, and it premiered alongside its televised broadcast in Japan, while the worldwide release has two premiere dates. (Note: The series was released simultaneously on Netflix Japan alongside its televised broadcast, while subsequent international streaming releases premiered weekly on July 13 in Asia and selected non-Asian territories and on September 7 in the remaining regions, including the United States. As such, the episode table uses the former dates.)

==== Episodes ====
No.	Title	Directed by	Written by	Storyboarded by	Original release date
1	"Rintaro and Kaoruko"; Transliteration: "Rintarō to Kaoruko" (Japanese: 凛太郎と薫子)	Miyuki Kuroki	Rino Yamasaki	Miyuki Kuroki	July 6, 2025
Rintaro Tsumugi is a student who attends Chidori Public High School, an institution for delinquent boys. Situated beside his school is the prestigious Kikyo Private Academy Girls' High School, who looks down on Chidori with disdain. Rintaro also works at his family's bakery with his mother Kyoko. He attends to a young girl who is a regular customer, though the girl quickly leaves. Rintaro learns from Kyoko that the girl's name is Kaoruko Waguri, and fears he may have frightened her due to his intimidating appearance. The next day, Kaoruko asks to talk to Rintaro, and she reveals they had met before and that she does not find Rintaro intimidating, surprising him. Rintaro suddenly finds Kaoruko being harassed by a group of boys who owed Rintaro a debt, and they claim she should not get close to him. Kaoruko calls them out on only knowing him at face value, as Rintaro comes to her defense when one of the boys attempts to hurt Kaoruko and scares them off. Kaoruko thanks him and promises to visit the bakery in the future. Rintaro thinks back on Kaoruko's care for him and wonders on her next visit, when he sees to his shock that Kaoruko is a student at Kikyo.
2	"Chidori and Kikyo"; Transliteration: "Chidori to Kikyō" (Japanese: 千鳥と桔梗)	Haruka Tsuzuki	Rino Yamasaki	Haruka Tsuzuki	July 13, 2025
Rintaro listens to his friends Shohei Usami, Saku Natsusawa, and Ayato Yorita express dismay on Kikyo's students loathing them, causing Rintaro to believe he and Kaoruko will become distant due to their school affiliations. After school, Rintaro and a group of Chidori students find Kaoruko waiting by their school's gate. Shohei threatens Kaoruko, forcing Rintaro to defuse the situation. Rintaro believes that Kaoruko was expecting him, leaving him unusually warmed. Saku later asks Rintaro on his recent behavior, assuring him they will listen. Rintaro refuses to divulge information, disappointing Saku. Rintaro returns to the bakery and sees Kaoruko waiting. Kaoruko affirms Rintaro's assumptions and remarks she can be able to know him better, before leaving with a sullen expression. Kyoko stresses to a confused Rintaro that Kaoruko sees him beyond his affiliation, giving him clarity. Rintaro meets Kaoruko by Kikyo's gate the next day, apologizing and promising to set aside his biases and learn more about Kaoruko as a person.
3	"A Kind Person"; Transliteration: "Yasashii Hito" (Japanese: 優しい人)	Satoshi Yamaguchi	Honoka Katō	Satoshi Yamaguchi	July 20, 2025
Rintaro and Shohei face difficulties with exams, so they head to a public library to study. As Rintaro finds out Kaoruko would not be able to visit the bakery, Shohei leaves to ask for Saku and Ayato's help. Rintaro sees Kaoruko tutoring her classmate, learning that Kaoruko is studious. Rintaro later asks Kaoruko to tutor him, when a silver-haired Kikyo student named Subaru Hoshina confronts them. Subaru demands Rintaro to back off from Kaoruko due to his Chidori affiliation, as Shohei returns with Saku and Ayato. Subaru angrily leaves with Kaoruko, with Subaru and Saku exchanging insults before Rintaro calms them down. Kaoruko then apologizes for the previous mishap at Chidori, surprising Subaru and Rintaro's friends. Subaru questions Kaoruko's action, and Kaoruko states Rintaro and his friends are good people, shaking Subaru's belief of all men being loathsome. Kaoruko later calls Rintaro to clarify that Subaru is a kind friend and compliments his courageousness during the mix-up. They decide to do a study session in the weekend and begin speaking casually. Meanwhile, a wistful Subaru looks at a framed childhood photo of her and Kaoruko, as she begins to question what she truly believes in.
4	"Warmth of the Heart"; Transliteration: "Kokoro no Ondo" (Japanese: 心の温度)	Jirō Arimoto	Rino Yamasaki	Miyuki Kuroki	July 27, 2025
Rintaro and Kaoruko meet up for the study session, as both individuals become flustered with each other. Rintaro explains to Kaoruko that he wants to pass the exams so that he can attend an upcoming sports festival with his friends. Kaoruko points out how Rintaro values them, prompting her to further explain that Subaru's behavior and discomfort around men was rooted from her past and thanking him for not judging Subaru. After Kaoruko goes home, Subaru confronts Rintaro and asks to talk. Subaru requests Rintaro to stop meeting Kaoruko out of concern for Kaoruko's safety within Kikyo. When Rintaro questions why she cares about Kaoruko, Subaru explains she had been bullied by boys as a child for her hair color and Kaoruko stood up for her, leading Subaru to protect her in any way she can. Despite Subaru's pleas, Rintaro respectfully declines and leaves, feeling dismay on his honest answer to an understanding but disappointed Subaru. Rintaro passes the exams thanks to Kaoruko's guidance, leaving him glad. Rintaro's happiness is, however, short-lived when Saku finds a written note from Kaoruko in Rintaro's notebook, shocking and enraging Saku.
5	"Premonition of a New Beginning"; Transliteration: "Hajimari no Yokan" (Japanese: はじまりの予感)	Ryosuke Oka	Rino Yamasaki	Miyuki Kuroki & Ryosuke Oka	August 3, 2025
Saku confronts Rintaro on his connection with Kaoruko, but Rintaro refuses to elaborate. Rintaro later thanks Kaoruko for her help, though he is disheartened after Kaoruko tells him to have fun in the festival. Rintaro distances himself from Saku, worrying Shohei and Ayato. The two catch up to Saku and hear his fears of Rintaro not trusting them. Shohei counters that Rintaro helps them without knowing it and Ayato adds Rintaro was expressing his genuine feelings, assuring Saku that he will open up in time, though Saku remains skeptical. Rintaro later helps at the bakery, where Kyoko learns he passed his exams. Kaoruko visits them to buy pastries and congratulates Rintaro. Seeing Rintaro's sadness, however, Kaoruko cheers him up to feel better. Rintaro reflects on Kaoruko's warmth as he celebrates with Kyoko. Kyoko shares her gratitude on Rintaro's recent achievement, recounting how he was burdened by hardship as a child. Kyoko also catches on that Rintaro has been changing positively, much to her happiness. Later, Kaoruko meets with Subaru at a playground they used to play in, and Subaru reveals she had talked to Rintaro.
6	"Self-Loathing"; Transliteration: "Daikirai" (Japanese: 大嫌い)	Makoto Katō	Rino Yamasaki	Makoto Katō	August 10, 2025
6	"I Love You!"; Transliteration: "Daisuki" (Japanese: 大好き)	Makoto Katō	Rino Yamasaki	Makoto Katō	August 10, 2025
Subaru reflects on Kaoruko's caring demeanor, remarking she wishes to be like her as she talks to Kaoruko about her meeting with Rintaro. Subaru expresses guilt on trying to break apart Kaoruko and Rintaro's friendship, only for Kaoruko to apologize for worrying her. Subaru looks back on how she was consumed by anxiety and cries, believing she only hinders Kaoruko. Despite this, Kaoruko reiterates she is a kind friend, adding she has always been by her side since their childhood and cherishes her. After Kaoruko states she still wants to see Rintaro, Subaru asks if she loves him, which Kaoruko confirms. Feeling relaxed, Subaru shares Rintaro's answer of still wanting to see Kaoruko, flustering the latter. As the two walk home, Kaoruko receives a message from Rintaro asking to meet with Subaru. The next day, Rintaro and Subaru talk, where Rintaro asks how he should meet with Kaoruko in the future. Subaru, seeing Rintaro's care for both her and Kaoruko, reassures him that she resolved the situation with Kaoruko and tells him they can meet far from their schools. Subaru then asks Rintaro if they can be friends, surprising Rintaro.
7	"Coolest Guy Ever"; Transliteration: "Kakkoii Otoko" (Japanese: かっこいい男)	Hideaki Takahashi	Rino Yamasaki	Satoshi Yamaguchi	August 17, 2025
Shohei, Saku, and Ayato grow suspicious with Rintaro's withdrawn behavior, so they secretly follow him to a restaurant and see him meet with Kaoruko and Subaru. The trio overhears Rintaro planning to clear up everything to them. Kaoruko and Subaru accept his sincerity, leaving the trio stunned. As Rintaro, Kaoruko, and Subaru go home, they are cornered by the same group of boys who owed Rintaro being joined by their upperclassmen. One of the boys touches Subaru's hair, discomforting her. Shohei, Saku, and Ayato intervene and tell Rintaro to leave with the girls. Rintaro complies, and Ayato beats up the group after learning they hurt Rintaro. Ayato calls Rintaro to reassure him they are fine, as he warns the injured group that Rintaro is a cool guy before leaving with Shohei and Saku. At Chidori's sports festival, the trio meets with Rintaro, where Saku apologizes for his previous behavior and reaffirms his trust for him. Warmed by Saku's words, Rintaro scores a victory for his class, leaving them overjoyed.
8	"The Meaning of These Feelings"; Transliteration: "Kanjō no Shōtai" (Japanese: 感情の正体)	Haruka Tsuzuki	Honoka Katō	Haruka Tsuzuki	August 24, 2025
After the sports festival, Rintaro formally introduces his friends to Kaoruko and Subaru. The girls thank Shohei, Saku, and Ayato for helping them the previous evening, and Subaru apologizes on her poor behavior during the confrontation at the library. Saku also apologizes on his prior insults towards Subaru, as she and Kaoruko gift the boys a selection of pastries. Subaru remains worried of befriending Chidori students, but Shohei reassures her that they do not care about their school affiliations, surprising Subaru and the group begins to bond. Kaoruko later requests Rintaro to a hangout, and they head to an aquarium. Rintaro nervously thinks their hangout is akin to a date as he and Kaoruko spend time. The duo also assists a lost child, who interprets them as a couple which flusters Rintaro. The child shares her admiration towards her crush's smile, leading Rintaro to look back on his recent admiration for Kaoruko. After reuniting the child with her parents, Rintaro and Kaoruko watch a dolphin show, where Kaoruko expresses joy towards Rintaro opening up more. Rintaro fully realizes that he has fallen for Kaoruko.
9	"Blond Hair and Pierced Ears"; Transliteration: "Kinpatsu to Piasu" (Japanese: 金髪とピアス)	Makoto Katō, Midori Masaki & Xing Zhi Li	Honoka Katō	Makoto Katō, Midori Masaki & Xing Zhi Li	August 31, 2025
As Rintaro begins to constantly think about his recent hangout with Kaoruko, Shohei asks if he, Saku, and Ayato can visit his place. Realizing he has not yet opened up about his family and business, Rintaro agrees to the request, leaving his friends in surprise with his family's bakery. Kaoruko and Subaru later join and the group settles down in his living room while Kyoko prepares lunch. Shohei then asks how Rintaro got his blond hair and ear piercings, leading Rintaro to reveal he was inspired by the appearance of a foreign baker at a bakery he and his family visited during his youth. When Rintaro mentions he grew up without friends, Shohei and Kaoruko retort that the people who avoided him did not truly see his kindheartedness. Kyoko overhears their conversation, leaving her grateful for their care of Rintaro after supporting a lonely and burdened Rintaro in the past by also dyeing her hair and piercing her ears. Rintaro thanks Kyoko for her efforts in accommodating him and his friends, further warming her. The group plans their summer break, only to be reminded of the upcoming exams. Kaoruko suggests they all do a study session.
10	"Summer Storm"; Transliteration: "Aoi Arashi" (Japanese: 青い嵐)	Yūki Nakano	Rino Yamasaki	Chizuko Kusakabe	September 7, 2025
The group heads to a restaurant to conduct their study session. Subaru experiences difficulty with one of Kikyo's test questions, and Saku easily solves it to the group's astonishment. The boys later pass their exams, allowing them to enjoy the break. They join their classmates to play bowling, where Rintaro reflects on becoming more open to his friends. The group spots Kaoruko and Subaru walking with their friends and Shohei attempts to greet them, only to be silenced by Saku and Ayato to avoid trouble. The trio then sees Rintaro staring at Kaoruko's direction, prompting Shohei to bluntly ask if he likes Kaoruko. A bashful Rintaro confirms their suspicions, much to Saku and Ayato's exasperation. Rintaro thinks of what it is like dating someone, and he approaches Ayato for advice. Ayato admits he has no knowledge on dating, though he expresses his joy of Rintaro opening up to them, reassuring him that he will support his endeavors. The boys later chat through text, when Rintaro receives a message from Subaru about Kaoruko's upcoming birthday, surprising Rintaro.
11	"A Morsel of Warmth"; Transliteration: "Nukumori no Hitokuchi" (Japanese: ぬくもりのひとくち)	Hikaru Yamaguchi	Honoka Katō	Satoshi Yamaguchi & Hideaki Takahashi	September 14, 2025
With Kaoruko's birthday approaching, Rintaro has difficulty in thinking what he can gift to her. Kyoko suggests he bake a cake for Kaoruko with the help of his father Keiichiro. Rintaro is reluctant, citing his inexperience and Keiichiro's exhaustion, but Kyoko reassures that Keiichiro is open to assist him. Rintaro requests Keiichiro's help, prompting a passionate Keiichiro to ask the type of message he wants to convey to Kaoruko with the cake. Rintaro replies with wanting to show his gratitude to her and begins intensely training under Keiichiro. Rintaro also messages Kaoruko on wanting to meet up on her birthday. Rintaro slowly improves his baking in time for Kaoruko's birthday, much to Keiichiro and Kyoko's delight. Rintaro meets with Kaoruko and gifts her the cake. Rintaro reveals he baked it and expresses his gratitude to Kaoruko, stunning her. They part ways as Kaoruko tastes Rintaro's cake at her home. Kaoruko then calls Rintaro and shares her enjoyment with his cake, leaving a glad Rintaro to relay the news to Keiichiro and Kyoko. Rintaro also states his willingness to help at the bakery during summer break, which his parents eagerly accept.
12	"Bewilderment at the Beachside"; Transliteration: "Umibe no Madoi" (Japanese: 海辺の惑い)	Yuichi Shimohira	Rino Yamasaki	Tomohisa Taguchi	September 21, 2025
Rintaro, Kaoruko, and their friends travel to the beach to start their break. Rintaro shares to Saku his recent enjoyment with baking while the group buys snacks and fireworks. The group arrives at the beachfront, though Subaru remains dour and worries she is ruining their trip. Kaoruko senses Subaru's anxieties and helps her open up to Rintaro and his friends. Saku remarks they already enjoy her company, easing Subaru's concerns. The group prepares the fireworks as evening arrives, while Saku gifts Subaru donuts after noticing her hunger. Subaru aspires to be able to love herself the same way as Kaoruko cherishes her in the future. She joins the boys to buy additional snacks and fireworks, while Rintaro and Kaoruko stay at the beach. The two discuss recent events when Rintaro inadvertently confesses his feelings to Kaoruko, surprising and flustering them both as Subaru and the boys return. The group heads back home and goes their separate ways, where Rintaro aims to correct the mishap and calls Kaoruko.
13	"Kaoruko and Rintaro"; Transliteration: "Kaoruko to Rintarō" (Japanese: 薫子と凛太郎)	Miyuki Kuroki & Makoto Katō	Rino Yamasaki	Miyuki Kuroki & Makoto Katō	September 28, 2025
Rintaro arranges to discuss with Kaoruko about the recent confession, and Kaoruko chooses to meet during the summer festival. Rintaro clarifies his love to Kaoruko, explaining that he felt lonely upon realizing their time together would eventually end and admitting he wants to experience more joy with her. Hearing this, Kaoruko reveals to Rintaro that the day they actually first met at the bakery occurred when she was burdened by personal issues. She cried upon tasting his family's pastries, and further felt warmth when Rintaro attended to her, adding that he had saved her on that day. Kaoruko admits she would regularly visit the bakery in the hopes to speak with Rintaro. After Rintaro, now unaware of their first meeting, noticed her again, Kaoruko made efforts to learn more about him and discovered that he attended Chidori, causing her love for Rintaro to blossom. Kaoruko then thanks Rintaro on clarifying his feelings and reciprocates his love. Rintaro shares his joy on being able to discover new things thanks to Kaoruko's efforts, as they begin a new chapter in their lives as a couple.

== Reception ==
=== Manga ===
The Fragrant Flower Blooms with Dignity was nominated for the 2022 Next Manga Awards in the web category and was ranked sixth out of fifty nominees. The series was also nominated for the Tsutaya Comic Awards and ranked second. It ranked seventh in the Nationwide Bookstore Employees' Recommended Comics of 2023. The series was nominated for the 47th Kodansha Manga Award in the shōnen category in 2023; it was also nominated in the same category for the 48th edition in 2024; for the 49th edition in 2025; and for the 50th edition in 2026. It won the Daruma for Best Romance Manga and was nominated in the Daruma for Best Manga, Screenplay, and New Manga categories at the Japan Expo Awards in 2026.

The series had over 4.3 million copies in circulation by March 2025, over 7.5 million copies in circulation by September 2025, and over 10 million copies in circulation by December 2025.

=== Anime ===
==== Critical response ====
The anime has received widespread critical acclaim. Paulo Kawanishi of Polygon praised its writing, art, animation, and characters while stated, "When an anime walks a more common route by using the classic tropes of a genre, most of the result depends on the quality of the writing and animation, like we've seen in the past with Ao Haru Ride and Horimiya. The Fragrant Flower Blooms with Dignity proves that by turning the world of teenagers into a garden of potential flowers whose beautiful colors I'm eager to see". Ayaan Shams Siddiquee of The Daily Star wrote: "It's almost impossible not to root for [this series]. With CloverWorks' gorgeous production and the source material's story that sidesteps the genre's usual pitfalls, this might just be one of the most enjoyable romance anime to come out in recent years. If you've grown tired of recycled romcom formulas, this show will remind you why the genre can still be exciting when done right".

Writing for Anime News Network, Rebecca Silverman gave the series' final episode a perfect rating, complimented its romantic storytelling and Kaoruko's point of view towards Rintaro. She concluded: "For a romance with minimal touching, no official dating, and no kissing, The Fragrant Flower Blooms with Dignity is incredibly romantic. Freed from the trappings and tropes of the romance genre, it is instead able to focus on the emotional component. It follows the characters' growth not just romantically, but also as they discover their own dignity and learn how to at least respect themselves, and those allow them to fall in love".

==== Accolades ====
Year	Award	Category	Recipient	Result	Ref.
2025	Abema Anime Trend Awards	Opening Animation Award	"Manazashi wa Hikari" by Tatsuya Kitani	Won	
2025	AT-X	Top Anime Ranking	The Fragrant Flower Blooms with Dignity	6th place	
2026	D Anime Store Awards	Heart-Pounding Anime	The Fragrant Flower Blooms with Dignity	Won	
2026	12th Anime Trending Awards	Anime of the Year	The Fragrant Flower Blooms with Dignity	Nominated	
2026	12th Anime Trending Awards	Boy of the Year	Rintaro Tsumugi	Nominated	
2026	12th Anime Trending Awards	Girl of the Year	Kaoruko Waguri	Nominated	
2026	12th Anime Trending Awards	Couple or Ship of the Year	Rintaro and Kaoruko	Won	
2026	12th Anime Trending Awards	Supporting Boy of the Year	Saku Natsusawa	Nominated	
2026	12th Anime Trending Awards	Supporting Girl of the Year	Subaru Hoshina	Nominated	
2026	12th Anime Trending Awards	Best in Character Design	The Fragrant Flower Blooms with Dignity	Nominated	
2026	12th Anime Trending Awards	Ending Theme Song of the Year	"Hare no Hi ni" by Reira Ushio	Nominated	
2026	12th Anime Trending Awards	Drama Anime of the Year	The Fragrant Flower Blooms with Dignity	Nominated	
2026	12th Anime Trending Awards	Romance Anime of the Year	The Fragrant Flower Blooms with Dignity	Won	
2026	12th Anime Trending Awards	Best Voice Acting Performance – Male	Yoshinori Nakayama as Rintaro Tsumugi	Nominated	
2026	10th Crunchyroll Anime Awards	Best New Series	The Fragrant Flower Blooms with Dignity	Nominated	
2026	10th Crunchyroll Anime Awards	Best Romance	The Fragrant Flower Blooms with Dignity	Won	
2026	10th Crunchyroll Anime Awards	Best Slice of Life	The Fragrant Flower Blooms with Dignity	Nominated	
2026	10th Crunchyroll Anime Awards	"Must Protect at All Costs" Character	Kaoruko Waguri	Nominated	
2026	10th Crunchyroll Anime Awards	Best Voice Artist Performance (Castilian)	Marta Barbará as Kaoruko Waguri	Nominated	
2026	Japan Expo Awards	Daruma for Best Anime	The Fragrant Flower Blooms with Dignity	Nominated	
2026	Japan Expo Awards	Daruma for Best Romance Anime	The Fragrant Flower Blooms with Dignity	Won	
2026	16th Newtype Anime Awards	Best Work (TV/Streaming)	The Fragrant Flower Blooms with Dignity	3rd place	
