= Food for the Soul =

Japanese anime television series

- Key visual
- 日々は過ぎれど飯うまし
- Genre: Gourmet; Slice of life
- Created by: Team Apa
- Directed by: Shinya Kawatsura; Yū Harumi
- Series composition: Yoshihiro Hiki
- Character designers: Atto (original); Kazuho Mitsuda
- Music by: Hiromi Mizutani

Production
- Studio: P.A. Works
- Producers: Yosuke Toba; Mitsuhito Tsuji
- Production companies: Food for the Soul Committee

Original release
- Networks: Tokyo MX, GYT, GTV, BS11, Nagoya TV, ABC TV, AT-X
- Release: April 13 – June 29, 2025

Related
- Manga
- Written by: Atto
- Illustrated by: Quro
- Published by: Media Factory
- Imprint: MF Comics
- Magazine: Comic Alive+
- Original run: March 15, 2025 – present
- Volumes: 3

Food for the Soul (日々は過ぎれど飯うまし, Hibi wa Sugiredo Meshi Umashi; lit. 'Days Go By But Food Is Delicious'), also known as Hibimeshi (ひびめし) for short, is an original Japanese anime television series produced by P.A. Works. It aired from April to June 2025. A manga adaptation by Atto and illustrated by Quro began serialization on Media Factory's Comic Alive+ manga website in March 2025.

== Plot ==
Mako Kawai is a first-year college student who is shy and afraid to try new things. She has a hobby of cooking and is often curious about the food she finds around her, although her curiosity is often thwarted by her nature. However, unexpectedly she meets her elementary school friend, Shinon Ogawa, who turns out to be her college friend. Shinon creates a new club themed on food research at her campus and tries to invite Mako to join her club. Together with Kurea Furutachi, Nana Hoshi, and Tsutsuji Higa, the five of them go on an adventure to find delicious and tasty food.

== Characters ==
Mako Kawai (河合まこ, Kawai Mako)
Voiced by: Hana Shimano
A first-year student who joins the Food Culture Research Club and enables its approval by being their fourth member. Nicknamed "Makocchi" (まこっち) by childhood friend Shinon (and later Tsutsuji), she works night shifts at an inarizushi bar. Her cooking expertise comes from past experience in her childhood, as well as being a regular viewer of Mokotaro's channel. She helps her club stay within its remit by conducting most of the cooking under the club's name.
Kurea Furutachi (古舘くれあ, Furutachi Kurea)
Voiced by: Ai Kakuma
A first-year student who was one of the Food Culture Research Club's initial three members, later assigned as the deputy leader. She helps out at her mother's family restaurant, the one Mako previously passed by before learning of Kurea's connection to said restaurant. Before Mako joined the Food Culture Research Club, Kurea encouraged a shy Mako to try out her restaurant. Afterwards, as part of the Food Culture Research Club, Kurea helps Mako with most of the cooking under the club's name, while also being the most level-headed and responsible of her group, making key leadership decisions on the club's behalf.
Shinon Ogawa (小川しのん, Ogawa Shinon)
Voiced by: Yoshino Aoyama
A first-year student who founded the Food Culture Research Club and is later assigned as its president. She knows Mako from her childhood, but views her previous nickname "Oshinko" (おしんこ) as an embarrassment. She is outgoing and hyperactive, but mostly forgetful and sometimes careless. She initially formed her club as a means to slack off on campus, though later helps her club pass an initial inspection, and becomes more involved with relevant club activities over time.
Tsutsuji Higa (比嘉つつじ, Higa Tsutsuji)
Voiced by: Natsune Inui
A first-year student who was one of the Food Culture Research Club's initial three members. The shortest member of the club, she wrote their initial and revised applications to the student affairs office, assigning Shinon and Kurea with the first and second-in-command positions without consulting them first. She collects sheep-related memorabilia by means of being associated with her nickname "Hitsuji" (ひつじ、羊). She likes consuming energy drinks and playing the ukulele, though does not consider herself to be an active person.
Nana Hoshi (星なな, Hoshi Nana)
Voiced by: Saya Aizawa
A first-year student who joins the Food Culture Research Club after it was formed. She knows Tsutsuji from high school and is even more shy around strangers, but exhibits a more outgoing personality around people she perceives as friends. She likes puzzles and had originally intended to start a "Puzzle Club" by herself, but gave up as she was unable to find others who were interested. She keeps a pet chameleon at home called Pochi (ポチ).
Mokotarō (モコ太郎)
Voiced by: Azuki Moeno
The lemon-shaped mascot whose channel has a regular stream named "Mokotaro Eats Meals" (モコ太郎飯を食らう). Mako is a regular viewer of Mokotaro's channel, both for cooking expertise and for inspiration.
Mayumi Ota (大田まゆみ, Ōta Mayumi)
Voiced by: Ayaka Fukuhara
The student affairs officer who rejected the Food Culture Research Club's initial application before Mako joined. After accepting a revised application, she visits the club to inspect, and allows them to continue after seeing valid proof of their intent to cook.
Runa Hoshi (星るな, Hoshi Runa)
Voiced by: Honoka Kuroki
Nana's older sister, who runs a boutique named "Precious Park". Tsutsuji is acquainted with her, and often orders sheep-faced hoodies from her boutique. Runa does not like being around Pochi.
Sakura Kodama (児玉さくら, Kodama Sakura)
Voiced by: Megumi Nakajima
A third-year student who fronts the Agriculture Club, which uses a room adjacent to the Food Culture Research Club's in the same building, but as a storage space. Shinon had approached her for a spare refrigerator, and in exchange, agreed to help out at Sakura's plantation during harvest season. Sakura is also a licensed hunter, capable of operating a rifle for game hunting.
Hiyori (ひより) and Yuna (ゆな)
Voiced by: Ikumi Hasegawa and Rika Nagae
Mako and Shinon's other childhood friends.

== Media ==
=== Manga ===
A manga adaptation illustrated by Quro began serialization on Media Factory's Comic Alive+ manga website on March 15, 2025. Three tankōbon volumes have been released as of September 28, 2026.

No.	Release date	ISBN
1	May 28, 2025	978-4-04-811498-1
2	January 28, 2026	978-4-04-811703-6
3	September 28, 2026	978-4-04-972174-4

=== Anime ===
The original anime television series created by Atto, produced by Aniplex and animated by P.A. Works was announced on December 31, 2024. It was directed by Shinya Kawatsura and Yū Harumi, written by Yoshihiro Hiki, with Hiromi Mizutani composing the music. Original character designs were provided by Atto, while Hajime Mitsuda adapted the designs for animation. The series aired from April 13 to June 29, 2025, on Tokyo MX and other networks. (Note: Tokyo MX listed the series premiere on April 12, 2025, at 24:30, which is effectively April 13 at 12:30 a.m. JST.) The opening theme song is "Sonna Mon ne" (そんなもんね; "It Can Be Like That"), performed by Asmi, while the ending theme song is "Misoshiru to Butter" (味噌汁とバター; "Miso Soup and Butter"), performed by Reira Ushio. Crunchyroll streamed the series. Plus Media Networks Asia licensed the series in Southeast Asia and broadcasts it on Aniplus Asia.

==== Episodes ====
No.	Title	Directed by	Written by	Storyboarded by	Original release date
1	"Welcome to the Food Culture Research Club"; Transliteration: "Shoku Bunka Kenkyū-bu e Yōkoso" (Japanese: 食文化研究部へようこそ)	Tomoaki Ohta	Yoshihiro Hiki	Shinya Kawatsura & Yū Harumi	April 13, 2025
Mako Kawai, a first-year university student, is always curious about food and cooking but is too shy to explore new restaurants by herself. One day, while Mako is having lunch, she is reunited with Shinon, her childhood friend from elementary school, who also introduces her to Kurea and Tsutsuji. Three of them need one more member to form the Food Culture Research Club and invite Mako to join the club. That night, Mako finds the courage to try out sauce katsudon at a restaurant that she previously passed by after learning that it is Kurea's family restaurant. After dinner, Kurea tells Mako about Shinon's regret of not getting Mako's contact information when she had the chance and hope to get in touch with Mako again. Mako officially joins the Food Culture Research Club, only to find out from Shinon that it is a made-up club for them to have a space to slack off on campus.
2	"I Might Want to Cook"; Transliteration: "Ryōri Shitai Kamo" (Japanese: 料理したいかも)	Masanori Miyata	Yoshihiro Hiki	Yū Harumi	April 20, 2025
The girls clean the room they were assigned to, then each one brings one of their own items to the room. The student affairs officer who rejected the girls' initial application before Mako joined, then arrives at the room to notify the girls of an inspection on the following day – if they fail to prove valid organizational activity as written in their application, their club will be disqualified. The girls decide to cook, in order to pass inspection. Shinon and Tsutsuji gather the necessary equipment to allow Mako and Kurea to cook, and they prepare a camembert pilaf from a recipe that Mako found online.
3	"My Money's Gone!"; Transliteration: "Okane Nakunachatta!!" (Japanese: お金なくなっちゃった!!)	Tomoaki Yamashita	Yoshihiro Hiki	Junichi Sakata	April 27, 2025
A weekend hangout that Shinon proposed for the club to get to know each other better is thrown into doubt after Shinon finds that she doesn't have the necessary funds to afford the trip. Mako, Kurea and Tsutsuji go to Shinon's apartment to help her find the money she thought she lost. Once the money is found, the girls visit Mount Takao. They climb up the mountain in order to dine at the restaurant at the summit, then take a selfie in front of a sunset view overlooking the mountain.
4	"This Is Nana Hoshi"; Transliteration: "Kono-ko wa Hoshi Nana" (Japanese: この子は星なな)	Yuriko Abe	Yoshihiro Hiki	Masami Watanabe	May 4, 2025
The girls welcome a fifth member, Nana, who knows Tsutsuji from high school but turns out to be extremely shy around strangers, and had failed to start a club by herself before choosing to join the Food Culture Research Club. On the following weekend, Tsutsuji invites Mako to study with her and Nana. Mako gets permission to cook a meal using the allocated space outside. During the study session, Nana helps Mako with her German language revision before an upcoming exam. Meanwhile, Shinon begins working at Kurea's family restaurant. After her shift ends, Shinon goes to the club to help Mako prepare a meal as part of their effort to welcome Nana to the club. Kurea joins in time for the meal, and afterwards, Nana apologizes to Mako for her reaction at the end of the previous German lecture.
5	"Want to Go for a Drive?"; Transliteration: "Doraibu Ikanai?" (Japanese: ドライブ行かない？)	Yusuke Kanamori	Yoshihiro Hiki	Tokihiro Sasaki	May 11, 2025
Kurea and Shinon obtain their driving licenses. Kurea proposes a driving trip with the girls using her company's car. After receiving permission, Kurea and Shinon take a turn each to drive, but Shinon inadvertently drives onto a freeway without experience. The other girls direct her to pull over at a rest area. Kurea takes charge of driving for the remainder of the girls' day out. They decide to visit the outer fish market at Tsukiji and buy seafood to grill at a barbecue site at Kasai Marine Park. They then ride a ferris wheel before driving home.
6	"Could It Be I've Gained Some Weight?"; Transliteration: "Moshikashite Watashi Futotta...?" (Japanese: もしかして私太った...？)	Ryosuke Higashi, Yoshihide Kuriyama & Mizuki Iwata	Nanami Hoshino	Tomomi Umezu	May 18, 2025
Mako finds that she cannot fit into a new skirt that her friends picked out for her while shopping, despite the skirt being of the usual size she wears. Upon returning home, Mako finds that she has gained weight, and refuses to consume snacks at the club room over the following days. When the rest of the club finds out, Nana invites Mako to the gym, with Tsutsuji also joining on Kurea's order. Kurea and Shinon are unable to join, for they had been tasked with writing an abstract for their club, which was chosen to be part of their university's showcase. After sufficient progress at the gym, Mako's new skirt finally fits her, but she continues to diet, and goes to the club room exhausted after a morning run. Upon seeing this, the other girls treat Mako to a meal at a hamburger chain, in order for Kurea and Shinon to take the photos required for their showcase. At the end of the meal, Tsutsuji advises Mako to eat and exercise in moderation.
7	"I Don't Think I'll Ever Forget"; Transliteration: "Zutto Wasurenai to Omō" (Japanese: ずっと忘れないと思う)	Tomoaki Yamashita & Toru Shunsui	Yoshihiro Hiki	Masanori Miyata	May 25, 2025
In the middle of August, the girls go on a two-night vacation at a resort in Shimoda, Shizuoka. The lodge they stay in has a pizza oven that the girls plan to use, but rain on the first night prevents its use, forcing the girls to make do with curry for that night. They then watch movies and play games at their lodge before going to sleep. In the morning, Mako and Kurea prepare the pizza dough before joining the other girls at the beach until dusk. Afterwards, they have pizza and barbecued chicken wings for dinner. After the dinner, Mako talks with Kurea over her worries of leaving Kurea out of recent conversations involving their past experiences, since Kurea did not know any of the other club members prior to entering university. Kurea insists Mako had nothing to worry about, and begins to call Mako by her first name.
8	"The Air Conditioner Is... Broken?"; Transliteration: "Eakon... Kowareta...?" (Japanese: エアコン...壊れた...？)	Akira Takahashi & Masanori Takahashi	Nanami Hoshino	Masayoshi Nishida	June 1, 2025
Nana tells a story to Mako over the phone, of having to retrieve her pet Pochi prior to a scheduled appointment with a vet, while avoiding getting into trouble with her sister. Mako hears the story without knowing that Pochi is a chameleon. On another day, the girls visit their club room and find that its air-conditioning is not working. A third-year student named Sakura, who fronts the Agriculture Club that uses an adjacent room in the same building, then arrives to remind the Food Culture Research Club to help her with a harvest over the summer break, as promised by Shinon in exchange for the Agriculture Club's refrigerator. Afterwards, Sakura thanks the Food Culture Research Club for their help by giving them a small portion of the harvest. The girls return to the club room by dusk and prepare tempura using most of their harvest, along with watermelon fruit punch and chilled somen noodles. After the meal, the student affairs officer arrives to request Shinon to sign off a maintenance completion form regarding the air-conditioning of their club room's building.
9	"Let's Try Running a Stall!"; Transliteration: "Shutten Shitemimasu ka!" (Japanese: 出店してみますか！)	Tomoaki Yamashita	Yoshihiro Hiki	Yoshiyuki Asai	June 8, 2025
Mako and Shinon hire a stall for their university's upcoming cultural festival. The Food Culture Research Club agree to present a dish to serve to visitors from their stall. Mako and Kurea decide to serve curry, and are helped by Sakura from the Agriculture Club, who donates another portion of her harvest and shows them a place where they can buy wild game meat. Tsutsuji and Nana are tasked with logistical duties, which involve decorating their stall and distributing flyers to visitors on the day. Nana's fear of strangers is placated by her discovery that she no longer fears strangers that she cannot see; thus, Tsutsuji builds a full-body cardboard costume for Nana to wear during the festival. On the first day of the cultural festival, the Food Culture Research Club manage to sell out their entire stock of curry while receiving positive feedback from customers. In a post-credits scene, Mako gets a shock upon seeing on Mokotaro's channel that the lemon mascot visited her university on the day of the festival and tried out her curry.
10	"I'm Home"; Transliteration: "Tadaima" (Japanese: ただいま)	Shigenori Awai	Yoshihiro Hiki	Toru Shunsui	June 15, 2025
After her second semester finals, Mako takes a planned trip back to her hometown of Ine, Kyoto while also inviting the rest of the Food Culture Research Club to sleep over at her grandmother's traditional house for the night. Kurea tires after driving the girls to their initial destination of Mako's old home to greet relatives, leaving Shinon to drive the rest of the way. At their final destination, Kurea catches up on lost sleep while Mako and Shinon leave again to visit their childhood friends Hiyori and Yuna. Upon Mako and Shinon's return, the girls use the irori at Mako's grandmother's house to prepare a hot pot for dinner. At the end of the meal, Mako takes a club group photo for the first time, and wishes that the Food Culture Research Club would reunite one day and reminisce, like she did earlier in the day with her childhood friends.
11	"Are You Free for Christmas?"; Transliteration: "Kurisumasu Aitemasu ka!?" (Japanese: クリスマス空いてますか!?)	Kenya Ueno	Nanami Hoshino	Junichi Sakata	June 22, 2025
Nana, Shinon and Tsutsuji finish a study session late during exam season, and find themselves unable to leave their university campus building. They initially believe the rumor that their club would be disqualified if they were caught wandering out of hours, and attempt to escape without being seen. The student affairs officer finds them anyway and dismisses the rumor, although she asks the trio about another rumor involving the ghost of a hooded woman, which she had seen. It is later revealed that the hooded woman is Sakura, who is trying to hide herself after a late study session as well. On another day, the Food Culture Research Club agree to hold a Christmas Day party at Mako's apartment, due to Mako wanting to cook with better equipment than what they have in the club room. Mako spends most of Christmas Eve decorating her apartment and preparing the food for the occasion, but the next day, she misses a morning delivery of the Christmas present she wanted to give, and is disheartened when she greets her friends. They agree to wait for Mako's present, instead enjoying the bruschetta, salad and roast chicken that Mako prepared for the party. During the gift exchange, Mako receives the delivery, only to find out that it is the compost that Sakura has made to help Mako to grow vegetables at home.
12	"Thanks for the Feast!"; Transliteration: "Gochisōsama!!" (Japanese: ごちそうさま!!)	Toru Shunsui	Yoshihiro Hiki	Toru Shunsui	June 29, 2025
At some time between December 26th and New Year's Eve, Mako watches a Mokotaro video in which the lemon mascot samples a restaurant. Mako is able to visit the restaurant and order its signature dish for herself. On New Year's Eve, the Food Culture Research Club gather to clean their club room once more. As part of renovations, Shinon installs a corkboard on which the club members can pin photos of their activities together, while also converting their table into a kotatsu. After the girls finish cleaning, they sleep at their newly-installed kotatsu until after dark, and prepare a meal of soba and sushi for themselves using a new portable induction hob for indoor cooking, and a new hibachi for outdoor grilling. After the meal, they welcome in the new year. At just after three in the morning, Kurea takes them by car to her local shrine for the new year's visit, and to reminisce. As they walk back to Kurea's car from the shrine, they see the first sunrise of the year and take another group photo against the rising sun. In a post-credits scene, all five existing members of the Food Culture Research Club, having progressed to their second year of university study, begin recruiting new members during induction day.

== Reception ==
Jeremy Tauber of Anime News Network gave the series an overall positive review, with regards to the characters, the food design, and the soundtrack. While Tauber found every episode cozy, heartwarming and fun, he also noted that there are no frills to the slice of life premise at hand, and as such, not a lot of it would come off as too big a surprise for longtime fans of the genre.
