= Hana Shimano =

Japanese voice actress

- 嶋野 花
- Born: August 17; Chiba Prefecture
- Years active: 2019–present
- Agent: Axl-One
- Known for: Whisper Me a Love Song as Himari Kino; Wonderful Precure! as Nanami Kanie; Umamusume: Pretty Derby as Victoire Pisa

Hana Shimano (嶋野 花, Shimano Hana; born August 17) is a Japanese voice actress from Chiba Prefecture who is affiliated with Axl-One. She started her career in 2019, and in 2024 she played her first main role as Himari Kino in Whisper Me a Love Song.

== Biography ==
Shimano's interest in anime began at a young age when she watched Ojamajo Doremi on television. When she was in elementary she was fond of watching Gokujō!! Mecha Mote Iinchō and Kirarin Revolution among other series on television, as well as reading Naruto and Gintama. She began considering herself an otaku after becoming a fan of the anime adaptations of Gintama and The Prince of Tennis. She would also follow their reruns on television and their stage plays.

Her interest in voice acting developed after researching about the series The Beast Player on the internet and discovering that Kenichi Suzumura, who voiced Ial, also voiced Sougo Okita in Gintama. She was further encouraged to pursue voice acting after her classmates left her messages encouraging to do so in their graduation yearbook. Shimano became affiliated with the talent agency Axl-One in 2019. In 2023, she was cast in her first main role as Himari Kino, the protagonist of the anime series Whisper Me a Love Song; she also performed the series' ending theme. She also served as the host of the promotional radio program of second-hand anime goods retailer Lashinbang between January and June 2024.

== Personal life ==
Shimano has certifications in bookkeeping and information processing. She cites eating, collecting Shiba Inu figures, and visiting shrines and temples as among her hobbies. She can play the trombone.

== Filmography ==
=== TV series ===
2023

- Skip and Loafer as Jougasaki

2024

- Whisper Me a Love Song as Himari Kino
- Wonderful Precure! as Ema, Nanami Kanie, Kirarin Fawn

2025

- Food for the Soul as Mako Kawai

=== Video games ===
2026

- Umamusume: Pretty Derby as Victoire Pisa
