= Reira Ushio =

Japanese singer-songwriter

Reira Ushio 汐 れいら
- Born: February 9, 2002 (age 23); Edogawa, Tokyo, Japan
- Occupation(s): Singer, songwriter
- Years active: 2021–present
- Labels: Epic Records
- Website: ushioreira.com

Reira Ushio (汐 れいら, Ushio Reira; born February 9, 2002) is a Japanese singer and songwriter from Tokyo who is affiliated with ENS Entertainment. Originally starting her career as a street performer, she made her professional debut in 2021 with the release of the digital single "Sayonara City". She gained attention after her song "Sentimental Kiss", which was used as background music in the Abema reality series Who is a Wolf?, went viral on social media. Her songs have also been used in anime series such as Food for the Soul and The Fragrant Flower Blooms with Dignity.

== Biography ==
Ushio was born in Edogawa, Tokyo on February 9, 2002. Her interest in music began at an early age when her parents took her to music bars. When she was in elementary, she wanted to write novels, but decided to stick with music as she felt that opportunities in writing were more limited. When she was in high school, she joined her school's light music club. They originally performed covers of other artists' music, but she later decided to start writing her own songs, which her peers preferred.

After high school, Ushio studied literature at an art university, wanting to use her education to help her write lyrics. She also became part of a band. Her studies were affected by the COVID-19 pandemic in Japan, which resulted in the novel she was working on as part of her studies not being published. She decided to release the novel digitally instead, writing a song to accompany it. Around this time, talent agency ENS Entertainment contacted her and offered her to join them. At the time, she was considering quitting university and leaving her band, so she took the opportunity.

Ushio initially started her career as a street performer, performing in public in Tokyo as well as at music venues. She made her professional debut in September 2021 with the release of the digital single "Sayonara City" (さよならCITY), a song inspired by people's experiences during the pandemic. In 2022, the acoustic version of her song "Sentimental Kiss" was used as background music to the Abema reality series Who is a Wolf? The song became viral on social media, with the song receiving hundreds of thousands of plays on TikTok and YouTube.

Ushio made her major debut under Sony Music in August 2023 with the release of the digital single "Darling You". She released the song "Miso Soup and Butter" (味噌汁とバター, Misoshiru to Batā) digitally in October 2023; the song was later used as the ending theme to the 2025 anime television series Food for the Soul. She released the EP "No One" on August 14, 2024; the limited edition includes a booklet featuring short stories written by Ushio. Her song "Hare no Hi ni" (ハレの日に) is used as the ending theme to the 2025 anime television series The Fragrant Flower Blooms with Dignity.

== Discography ==
=== Singles ===
#	Release date	Title	Notes
1st	September 15, 2021	Sayonara CITY	Arranged by Shingo Kubota (Jazzin' Park)
2nd	February 9, 2022	B-Boy	Arranged by Shingo Kubota (Jazzin' Park)
3rd	March 14, 2022	Sentimental Kiss (Acoustic ver.)	Theme song for ABEMA dating show He and the Wolf-chan Can't Be Fooled
—	May 14, 2022	Sentimental Kiss	Arranged by ESME MORI
4th	July 20, 2022	Tightrope	Arranged by Numa
5th	September 14, 2022	Piercing at the Railroad Crossing	Arranged by Kazunori Fujimoto
6th	December 14, 2022	moviNG on	Arranged by ESME MORI
7th	August 23, 2023	Darling you	
8th	October 27, 2023	Miso Soup and Butter (味噌汁とバター, Misoshiru to Batā)	Ending theme for the anime Food for the Soul
9th	December 28, 2023	Circus Night at the Landing	Arranged by Kenji Ogura
10th	May 1, 2024	Memo Rock	
11th	June 26, 2024	Grey Heart Hacker	
12th	January 15, 2025	Hiding My Love	Insert song for ABEMA show Today, I Fell in Love: Graduation 2025 in Seoul
13th	February 25, 2025	Hiding My Love (Acoustic ver.)	
14th	March 26, 2025	Earring	

=== EPs ===
#	Title	Release date	Catalog number	Notes
1st	No one	August 14, 2024	ESCL-5976/7 (Limited); ESCL-5978 (Regular)	Includes 8 storybook-style booklets (limited) and lyrics booklet (regular)
Digital	The Procedures of Love	May 21, 2025	ESXX03054B00Z	
