= Whisper Me a Love Song =

Japanese manga series and its adaptations

- First tankōbon volume cover featuring Yori Asanagi (left) and Himari Kino (right).

ささやくように恋を唄う (Sasayaku Yō ni Koi o Utau)
- Genre: Yuri
- Manga
- Written by: Eku Takeshima
- Published by: Ichijinsha
- English publisher: NA: Kodansha Comics
- Magazine: Comic Yuri Hime
- Original run: February 18, 2019 – present
- Volumes: 13
- Anime television series
- Directed by: Akira Mano (1–10 (Note: No director is credited for episodes 11–12.))
- Written by: Hiroki Uchida
- Music by: Hiroshi Sasaki; Wataru Maeguchi
- Studio: Yokohama Animation Laboratory; Cloud Hearts (1–10)
- Licensed by: Sentai Filmworks
- Original network: ANN (TV Asahi); BS Asahi, AT-X
- Original run: April 14, 2024 – December 29, 2024
- Episodes: 12
- icon

Whisper Me a Love Song (Japanese: ささやくように恋を唄う, Hepburn: Sasayaku Yō ni Koi o Utau) (Note: Also translated as Whispering You a Love Song) is a Japanese manga series written and illustrated by Eku Takeshima. It was first serialized in Ichijinsha's Comic Yuri Hime April 2019 issue and is licensed in English by Kodansha Comics. The series follows Himari Kino, a first-year high school girl, and Yori Asanagi, a third-year high school girl in a band, after Himari's confession of admiration for Yori's singing leads to a romantic misunderstanding.

Takeshima created the story based on the idea of a senpai-kōhai dynamic, a type of social relationship commonplace in Japanese culture. Afterwards, she worked in an element of miscommunication stemming from love at first sight, as well as a balanced relationship between the two leads as they evoked emotional reactions from each other.

An anime television series adaptation produced by Cloud Hearts and Yokohama Animation Laboratory aired from April to December 2024 after numerous production delays. Several insert songs and two ending themes were created for the series. Takeshima helped supervise the audition process, and throughout recording, the voice actors aimed to portray their characters' personalities through their expression.

In 2020, the manga series was nominated for Niconico and Da Vinci's Next Manga Awards and selected as the winner of Yuri Navi's Yuri Manga Awards. It had sold over one million copies by August 2024, and has been well received by critics, with praise for its story, characters, and themes of LGBTQ+ representation. The anime adaptation has received more mixed reviews, with positive comments for its plot but criticism for its production value.

== Synopsis ==
On her first day of high school, Himari Kino watches her senior Yori Asanagi perform with a band and instantly falls in love with her singing. When Himari confesses her admiration to Yori, she misinterprets Himari's feelings as romantic love. However, she falls for Himari anyway and promises to win her affections for real after finding out the truth.

== Characters ==
Himari Kino (木野 ひまり, Kino Himari)
Voiced by: Hana Shimano
Portrayed by: Yui Watanabe
A first-year high school student and energetic girl who falls in love with Yori's singing on her first day of school. She confesses her admiration to Yori, who misinterprets her feelings as romantic. Upon learning of Yori's true feelings for her, however, she eventually discovers that she loves Yori too and they become lovers.
Yori Asanagi (朝凪 依, Asanagi Yori)
Voiced by: Asami Seto, Kana Sasakura (singing voice)
Portrayed by: Momoka Ishii
A third-year high school student who serves as the vocalist and lead guitarist for the band SSGIRLS after their previous vocalist quit. Often seen as stoic, Yori enjoys singing alone while playing the guitar on the school's rooftop. Yori falls for Himari after her "confession", only to realize later that Himari was actually confessing admiration for her singing. However, she resolves to get Himari to reciprocate her feelings in time, and they eventually become lovers.
Aki Mizuguchi (水口 亜季, Mizuguchi Aki)
Voiced by: Mikako Komatsu
Portrayed by: Yuuki Temma
A cheerful third-year student and the bassist for SSGIRLS. She is Yori's best friend and tries to support her in winning over Himari while hiding her own romantic feelings for Yori. She had a falling out with the band's previous singer Shiho, who left the band on bad terms. After eventually learning that Shiho had romantic feelings for her and understanding how her feelings for Yori had changed, she makes up with Shiho and they become a couple.
Shiho Izumi (泉 志帆, Izumi Shiho)
Voiced by: Yuna Nemoto, Sui Mizukami (singing voice)
Portrayed by: Chiyuri Itō
A third-year student, and former vocalist and guitarist of SSGIRLS, which she left following a feud with Aki. She now fronts a rival band, Laureley, while also acting as a ghost member for the Culinary Research Club. It was later revealed that she had romantic feelings for Aki, becoming heartbroken upon discovering Aki had feelings for Yori and leaving the band as a result. Thanks to the efforts of Himari and others, however, she eventually manages to make up with Aki, who becomes her girlfriend.
Mari Tsutsui (筒井 真理, Tsutsui Mari)
Voiced by: Konomi Kohara
Portrayed by: Nagisa Hayakawa
A stoic third-year student and the drummer for SSGIRLS. She comes from a rich background and is childhood friends with Kaori. She tends to refer to people by their full names.
Kaori Tachibana (橘 香織, Tachibana Kaori)
Voiced by: Ai Kakuma
Portrayed by: Nanase Kayama
An easygoing third-year student and the keyboardist for SSGIRLS. She has been friends with Mari since childhood.
Miki Mizuguchi (水口 未希, Mizuguchi Miki)
Voiced by: Aoi Koga
Portrayed by: Yuuki Temma
Aki's younger sister and Himari's best friend since elementary school. She is part of the brass band club and tries to support Himari and Aki any way she can.
Momoka Satomiya (里宮 百々花, Satomiya Momoka)
Voiced by: Reina Ueda
Portrayed by: Shiori Nishikado
A kind-hearted second-year student who is the president of the Culinary Research Club and the guitarist for Laureley. Gentle and supportive, she quickly befriends Himari, who joins her club.
Hajime Amasawa (天沢 始, Amasawa Hajime)
Voiced by: Chika Anzai
Portrayed by: Kaede Sakuragi
A third-year student who is the drummer for Laureley. She is often seen with Momoka and is the younger sister of Momoka's late girlfriend Kyou.
Kyou Amasawa (矢沢 キョウ, Amasawa Kyō)
Voiced by: Nao Tōyama
A violinist who was Hajime's older sister and Momoka's girlfriend. She was originally friends with Shiho until Shiho became jealous of her talent. She died in an accident, leading Shiho and the others to form Laureley.

== Production ==
=== Manga ===
==== Conception ====
Prior to creating Whisper Me a Love Song, Takeshima had already had experience in drawing yuri manga, having created several doujinshi fan works featuring yuri relationships. She had also previously published a one-shot story, Kimi ni suki tte iwasetai (君に好きっていわせたい; lit. 'I want you to say I love you'), in Comic Yuri Hime. Takeshima has stated that she enjoys incorporating classic story tropes and is happiest when she can show characters being affectionate in these situations.

Whisper Me a Love Song began with the idea of a senpai-kōhai dynamic, a type of social relationship commonplace in Japanese culture. However, after struggling to develop a full story from this premise, Takeshima decided to focus first on character design, eventually creating around twelve different character visuals. Yori's design was decided relatively quickly, whereas Himari's took more time to finalize.

==== Development ====
According to Takeshima, once the character designs were established, the story developed more easily. Her editor suggested incorporating a misunderstanding stemming from love at first sight and having the senpai character play guitar, both of which were eventually worked into the plot. As serialization began, Takeshima found the first two chapters challenging, since they were published simultaneously and depicted the same scene of Himari and Yori meeting from both of their perspectives. Takeshima named her favorite scene as the panel where Himari falls in love with Yori after seeing her singing, which she redrew five times.

In terms of characterization, Takeshima aimed to portray Himari as an outgoing and straightforward girl who tended to act directly on her feelings. However, to avoid Himari coming across as self-centered, she made sure to show how Himari is also thoughtful with her actions. Meanwhile, for Yori, she focused on creating a contrast between her outwardly cool and composed appearance and her inwardly softer, more emotionally vulnerable side. The relationship between Himari and Yori was designed to be balanced, with each character alternately taking the lead and evoking emotional reactions in the other.

Following the manga's publication, Takeshima said that one of her happiest experiences as a creator was meeting her readers in person during an autograph session, where she could directly see their appreciation for her work.

=== Anime ===
==== Recording ====
For the adaptation, several changes to the story's presentation were made. For example, the scene where Himari confesses her love for Yori's singing was shown from both their perspectives in the original manga, but for the anime, this was condensed into a single scene from only Yori's perspective, shifting its emotional atmosphere.

The anime's voice actors were chosen through a tape audition, where they would read a script and send in a recording. Takeshima participated in the selection process, and after listening to around 60 recordings, she suggested that Hana Shimano voice Himari. Together with the anime's director, she also recommended that Asami Seto play Yori.

The recording took place in an atmosphere that the voice actors described as welcoming, and they gave advice to each other on how to best deliver lines. The sound director guided the voice actors on their performances. In addition, the voice actors frequently improvised dialogue.

==== Voice acting ====
Shimano initially tried balancing the pacing of her lines, but as she read more of the script, she felt that consistently expressing her dialogue energetically would better fit her character. However, she was conscious to do this in a natural way so that Himari would not seem manipulative. She also tried to convey a feeling of initially being more impressed with Yori as compared to being in love with her, which required her to re-record several lines.

Seto felt that when Yori first meets Himari, she tries to impress her by putting on a cool persona despite being naturally more excitable. To convey this, Seto deliberately contrasted Yori's calm dialogue with her more flustered internal monologues to show the intensity of Yori's inner thoughts. In addition, Seto always remained aware of Yori's emotional turmoil, even when the script would call for Seto to use an exaggerated tone for her monologues.

Yuna Nemoto, who played Shiho, said that she focused on portraying her character's force of will and determination, as well as her negative feelings towards the members of her former band. Due to her character's crucial role in the plot, she received advice from the anime's sound director to deliver her lines in a way that would stir up conflict. To express the intensity of her character's emotions, she projected her voice in a guttural way, which she found exhausting.

Mikako Komatsu, who voiced Aki, described her character as someone who experienced love at first sight and has an emotional side. However, because her character tends to also keep things hidden out of consideration for others, Komatsu tried to avoid expressing those feelings too much. She found this balance difficult to maintain, especially in a scene where Aki reacts to Yori's confession to Himari. As the story progressed, she focused on how Aki's feelings became increasingly visible.

==== Music ====
Kana Sasakura portrayed Yori's singing voice. She wrote the lyrics for "Orange ni Somatta Oozora" (Note: Orenji ni Somatta Oozora (オレンジに染まった大空; lit. 'The vast sky dyed orange')) and composed "Okujou no Melody" (Note: Okujou no Merodii (屋上のメロディー; lit. 'Melody of the rooftop')), two of the anime's insert songs. In addition, to convey her character's feelings, she tried to focus on the emotion of her singing rather than just technical skill. For example, after Sasakura recorded multiple takes for "Follow your arrows", the anime's opening song, the director chose a take for the section following the second chorus that he felt carried more nuance and emotion despite being less polished. For the song "Sunny Spot", played in the sixth episode, she revised her approach several times to balance between being expressive and keeping the light mood intended for the song. The same episode also features a scene of SSGIRLS performing, which involved filming motion-capture actors at a live music venue as a basis for the animation.

Sui Mizukami portrayed Shiho's singing voice. Mizukami had previously studied at the Berklee College of Music, and was chosen to perform Shiho's songs after the second round of auditions. For the song "Meritocracy", she aimed to convey Shiho's forceful personality, using her natural voice to create an imposing tone. However, she also tried to show Shiho's softer side, and sang certain lines with more hesitance or emotion. Sho Watanabe, the song's composer, helped guide her performance throughout.

== Media ==
=== Manga ===
Written and illustrated by Eku Takeshima, Whisper Me a Love Song began serialization in Japan in the April 2019 issue of Ichijinsha's Comic Yuri Hime magazine. It has been compiled into thirteen tankōbon volumes as of November 2026. Kodansha USA licensed the series for English-language release, and has published eleven volumes as of May 2026.

Ichijinsha published an anthology of the series titled Whisper Me a Love Song Official Comic Anthology (Note: ささやくように恋を唄う 公式コミックアンソロジー (Sasayaku Yō ni Koi o Utau: Kōshiki Komikku Ansorojī)) on July 29, 2024. It features standalone stories by various artists that include characters from the series.

=== Anime ===
An anime television series adaptation was announced on January 13, 2023. The series is produced by Cloud Hearts and Yokohama Animation Laboratory. Initially, it was announced that Xinya Cai would direct it; however, Cai stepped down due to health issues, and was replaced by Akira Mano. Hiroki Uchida oversaw the series scripts, Minami Yoshida designed the characters, and Hiroshi Sasaki and Wataru Maeguchi composed the music.

The series, initially scheduled to premiere in January 2024 but later delayed, aired the first ten episodes from April 14 to June 30, 2024, on the NUMAnimation programming block on all ANN affiliates, including TV Asahi. (Note: TV Asahi listed the series premiere at 25:30 on April 13, 2024, which is effectively April 14 at 1:30 a.m. JST.) The remaining two episodes aired on December 29 of the same year following further production delays. The Blu-ray release, originally slated for four volumes to be released between September 13 and December 13, 2024, was delayed and eventually cancelled due to internal circumstances.

The opening theme song is "Follow your arrows", performed by SSGIRLS with vocals by Kana Sasakura. The ending theme song for episodes 2–6 is "Giftee" (ギフティー, Gifutī), performed by Hana Shimano, while the ending theme for episode 8 onwards is "Meritocracy" (メリトクラシー, Meritokurashī), performed by Laureley with vocals by Sui Mizukami. Sentai Filmworks licensed the series for streaming on Hidive.

=== Stage play ===
In May 2024, it was announced that a stage play adaptation titled Butai: Sasayaku yō ni Koi o Utau (舞台「ささやくように恋を唄う」, Stage play: Whisper Me a Love Song) would run from the following July 26 to August 2 at the Theater1010 in Tokyo. It is directed by Tomoyuki Ueno and written by Yuniko Ayana, featuring Yui Watanabe and Momoka Ishii as Himari and Yori respectively.

== Reception ==
=== Accolades and sales ===
In 2020, Whisper Me a Love Song was nominated for Niconico and Da Vinci's Next Manga Awards, ranking eighteenth out of fifty nominees, and won Yuri Navi's Yuri Manga Awards, placing first out of 196 nominees. In the same year, it placed second in Yuri Navi's general poll and went on to claim first place in 2021. By March 2024, the series had sold over 500,000 copies. By August 2024, the series had sold over one million copies. In a 2025 poll of users' favorite yuri anime hosted by the site Anime! Anime!, the show placed sixth.

=== Critical reception ===
==== Manga ====
The manga's story was well received. Anson Leung of Broken Frontier acclaimed its central romance, writing that the series "hooks you with its realism, its sincerity, its warmth, its humor, and its unconditional acceptance of queer love." Sara Smith of The Graphic Library described the first volume as "very cute" and a "sweet love story", scoring it 8/10 overall, while Erica Friedman of Okazu, reviewing the second volume, called it "an oasis of innocence and joy" and a "genuine delight", rating it an 8/10 as well.

Several critics praised the series' characters, with Rebecca Silverman of Anime News Network (ANN) opining that their imperfections made them "all so human" and commending how they were "unabashedly themselves". Similarly, Friedman described the characters as "relatable [and] charming", scoring that aspect of the story a 9/10. Leung commented favorably on Himari's character, describing her journey of self-discovery as showing a "level of emotional maturity" that "speak[s] volumes to any reader."

The series' themes of LGBTQ+ representation were met with favorable reactions. Leung noted that Himari and Yori's lesbian relationship is treated normally by other characters, which he felt allowed the story to avoid "heteronormative prejudice" and become a "truly exceptional queer love story." Likewise, Friedman praised a scene where Himari's mother fully accepts Himari having a girlfriend, calling it "nice to see" compared to the typical "fraught" scenes of the genre. Silverman commended the story's depiction of "love just being love", later suggesting that Himari's portrayal left the possibility of her being demisexual and demiromantic.

Regarding the art style, Friedman praised Takeshima's illustrations, stating that it had a "dramatic quality" that was "very appealing." On the other hand, Silverman felt that the art was sometimes overly toned and gave it a B+ rating. Meanwhile, Leung opined that the art was deliberately stylized in a way that added elements of "fluffiness" and "warmth" to the story.

==== Anime ====
The anime's premiere was generally well received. Nicholas Dupree of ANN praised the premise, calling it "charming, sweet, and funny in equal measure", while James Beckett of the same site described it as "simple and sugary-sweet in all the right ways" and a "pleasure to watch". Chris Beveridge of Fandom Post characterized the debut episode as "very appealing and easy to stick with" for the strength of its story, giving it a B+ rating overall.

The anime's plot and characters were praised by several critics. Beveridge commented favorably on Himari and Yori's relationship, stating that it was "executed pretty well" and had "some real stakes". Vrai Kaiser of Anime Feminist likewise spoke positively of their relationship, opining that the series had a "surprising amount of introspection". Silverman commended the "strength of the romance" but was hesitant regarding pacing, feeling that the way that scenes transitioned broke up the story's flow.

Early reviews of the anime's production value were generally positive; Kaiser opined that it "looks soft and romantic in all the right moments". However, the production value of the anime's later episodes was criticized by many reviewers, with Kaiser stating that the "visuals really begin to struggle" there. Similarly, Silverman contended that production issues in the eight episode created some "truly awkward art" and bland illustrations. Josh Piedra of The Outerhaven said that sometimes the "art just suffered", with background patterns being "out of place and quite jarring."

The music received mixed comments. Piedra described it as "pretty good" but criticized the lack of full songs, while Richard Eisenbeis of ANN felt that it was not compelling enough despite being "above average". Kaiser called the anime's soundtrack "pleasant but unremarkable" with the exception of the song "Meritocracy", which she praised as having a "compelling bite". Silverman opined that in the final episode, the show "finally delivers the music that was lacking from its earlier outings."

Overall reviews following the anime's conclusion were also mixed. Friedman contended that the anime had "mauled" the manga with its poor production and regretted its wasted potential. Meanwhile, Kaiser acknowledged that the anime was "decidedly rough around the edges", but recommended it anyway, stating it was "very sweet" and had compelling drama. Silverman concluded that it "never fully lives up to its promise", but was still "glad that [she] watched this."

== See also ==
- Null & Peta, a media franchise with character designs by Eku Takeshima
- There's No Freaking Way I'll be Your Lover! Unless..., a yuri light novel series illustrated by Eku Takeshima
