= Farahnaz =

Farahnaz (Persian: فرحناز, from Arabic فرح (faraḥ) meaning joy, gladness and Persian ناز (nâz) meaning cute) is a Persian given name for girls common in Iran, South Asia, and Central Asia. People with this name include:

== Given name ==
- Farahnaz Bahrami (born 1962), Norwegian politician
- Farahnaz Forotan (born 1992), Afghan journalist
- Farahnaz Ispahani, Pakistani-American writer and former politician
- Farahnaz Nikray (born 1994), Japanese voice actress
- Farahnaz Pahlavi (born 1963), Pahlavi princess

== See also ==
- Farah (name)
- Naz (name)
