= Though I Am an Inept Villainess =

Japanese light novel series

- First light novel volume cover

ふつつかな悪女ではございますが ～雛宮蝶鼠とりかえ伝～ (Futsutsuka na Akujo de wa Gozaimasu ga: Sūgū Chōso Torikae Den)
- Genre: Fantasy; Romantic drama
- Novel series
- Written by: Satsuki Nakamura
- Published by: Shōsetsuka ni Narō
- Original run: July 15, 2020 – present
- Light novel
- Written by: Satsuki Nakamura
- Illustrated by: Kana Yuki
- Published by: Ichijinsha
- English publisher: NA: Seven Seas Entertainment
- Imprint: Ichijinsha Novels
- Original run: December 28, 2020 – present
- Volumes: 13
- Manga
- Written by: Satsuki Nakamura
- Illustrated by: Ei Ohitsuji
- Published by: Ichijinsha
- English publisher: NA: Seven Seas Entertainment
- Imprint: Zero Sum Comics
- Magazine: Monthly Comic Zero Sum
- Original run: December 28, 2020 – present
- Volumes: 11
- Anime television series
- Directed by: Mitsue Yamazaki
- Written by: Yoshiko Nakamura
- Music by: Yukari Hashimoto
- Studio: Doga Kobo
- Licensed by: Crunchyroll (streaming); Disney Platform Distribution (streaming); SEA: Netflix (streaming)
- Original network: TXN (TV Tokyo), AT-X
- Original run: July 12, 2026 – present
- Episodes: 11
- icon

Though I Am an Inept Villainess: Tale of the Butterfly-Rat Body Swap in the Maiden Court (Note: Japanese: ふつつかな悪女ではございますが ～雛宮蝶鼠とりかえ伝～, Hepburn: Futsutsuka na Akujo de wa Gozaimasu ga: Sūgū Chōso Torikae Den) is a Japanese light novel series written by Satsuki Nakamura and illustrated by Kana Yuki. The series originated on the Shōsetsuka ni Narō website in July 2020 before it was acquired by Ichijinsha. A manga adaptation, illustrated by Ei Ohitsuji, has been serialized in Monthly Comic Zero Sum since December 2020.

Set in a fictional kingdom based on Imperial China, the story follows a beloved but physically frail imperial consort candidate whose body is forcefully swapped with that of her widely despised, jealous rival. Instead of despairing over the situation, she is thrilled to finally possess a healthy, robust body and uses her unbreakable spirit to navigate the dangerous political conspiracies brewing within the palace.

An anime television series adaptation produced by Doga Kobo aired from July to September 2026, with a second cours scheduled to premiere in January 2027.

== Plot ==
In a kingdom, there is a secluded palace where the unmarried daughters of the five great noble families are gathered and trained to become future queens. Kou Reirin, the princess of one of these families, is known as the "Butterfly" for her extraordinary beauty, elegance and kindness, while Shu Keigetsu, the princess of another noble house, is despised throughout the imperial court and cruelly nicknamed the "Court Rat". Consumed by jealousy, Keigetsu resorts to an ancient Taoist art to exchange their bodies during a sacred ceremony.

Reirin finds herself trapped inside the body of the woman everyone despises, while Keigetsu inherits Reirin's status and admiration. Unable to reveal the truth due to the spell robbing her the ability to speak about it, Reirin chooses to remain true to herself despite the circumstances. Through her kindness, dignity and resilience, she gradually transforms the court's perception of Keigetsu, while Keigetsu comes to realize that the happiness she had always envied carries an unexpected price.

== Characters ==
=== Main ===
Kou Reirin (黄 玲琳, Kō Reirin)
Voiced by: Manaka Iwami, Natsumi Kawaida (in Keigetsu's body) (Japanese); Brianna Knickerbocker, Rebecca Wang (in Keigetsu's body) (English)
The maiden from Kou clan who is regarded as the "court butterfly". Reirin is renowned for her beauty and her kind disposition. While she is loved by everyone, she has a frail constitution and a weak body. Despite this, she possesses a strong resolve and is quite optimistic. She is the target of Keigetsu's rage and jealousy, which ultimately leads to them swapping bodies. However, Reirin is happy to have a healthy body and is fast to adapt to the new harsh environment that "Keigetsu" has to live. She holds no anger or resentment towards Keigetsu and has been trying to become friends with her.
Shu Keigetsu (朱 慧月)
Voiced by: Natsumi Kawaida, Manaka Iwami (in Reirin's body) (Japanese); Rebecca Wang, Brianna Knickerbocker (in Reirin's body) (English)
The maiden from Shu clan who is disregarded as the "court rat". Keigetsu grew up being ridiculed by her clan's court ladies for being made the maiden out of pity by the clan's noble consort. As a result, Reirin became the target of her rage and jealousy. She secretly learned forbidden magic to swap bodies with Reirin to steal her status and reputation, but gives up her healthy and strong body in exchange for Reirin's frail body. Keigetsu later regrets her actions and apologizes to Reirin after they discover the true reason why the swap occurred.
Ei Gyoumei (詠 尭明, Ei Gyōmei)
Voiced by: Makoto Furukawa (Japanese); Kaiji Tang (English)
The 20-year-old Crown Prince of the Ei Kingdom and Reirin's cousin. He is initially unaware about Reirin and Keigetsu's body swap.
Shin-u (辰宇)
Voiced by: Yūichirō Umehara (Japanese); Aleks Le (English)
Captain of the Eagle Eyes and the younger half-brother of Gyoumei. Shin-u is the emperor's younger son with another woman.
Leelee (莉莉, Riri)
Voiced by: Hana Hishikawa (Japanese); Lizzie Freeman (English)
A court lady of the Shu clan who serves Keigetsu. She is looked down upon due to her mother being a foreigner dancer who was believed to have seduced Leelee's father into marriage. Initially treating "Keigetsu" harsh, she become one of people that Reirin trust. Leelee later becomes aware of the swap after Tousetsu confronts Reirin about it.

=== Consorts ===
Shu Gabi (朱 雅媚)
Voiced by: Ai Kayano (Japanese); Grace Lu (English)
The Noble Consort who is the descendant of the Shu clan and Keigetsu's relative. Twenty-two years ago, Gabi was once the favorite of the emperor and was supposed to be the future empress, until the emperor became ill and Kenshuu chose to tend him. As a result, Kenshuu became the empress instead of Gabi.
Kin Reiga (金 麗雅)
Voiced by: Kotono Mitsuishi
The Pure Consort who is Seika's aunt. She has an arrogant and manipulative personality.
Ran Hourin (藍 芳林, Ran Hōrin)
Voiced by: Aya Hisakawa
The Virtuous Consort who is Houshun's aunt. While she comes across as being nice and friendly, she actually has a smug personality.
Gen Gousetsu (玄 傲雪, Gen Gōsetsu)
Voiced by: Takako Honda
The Worthy Consort who is Kasui's aunt. She rarely shows her emotions.

=== Maidens ===
Kin Seika (金 清佳)
Voiced by: Mai Nakahara (Japanese); Emi Lo (English)
Maiden from the Kin clan. While she comes across as being graceful and refined, she can be quite calculating and judgmental.
Ran Houshun (藍 芳春, Ran Hōshun)
Voiced by: Inori Minase (Japanese); Xanthe Huynh^{Ep. 5 credits} (English)
Maiden from the Ran clan.
Gen Kasui (玄 歌吹)
Voiced by: Yui Ishikawa (Japanese); Alejandra Reynoso^{Ep. 5 credits} (English)
Maiden from the Gen clan.

=== Kou clan ===
Kou Kenshuu (黄 絹秀, Kō Kenshū)
Voiced by: Rei Igarashi (Japanese); Caitlyn Elizabeth (English)
The empress who is Gyoumei's mother and Reirin's maternal aunt. 22 years ago, Kenshuu and Gabi were close friends. However, when the emperor became ill, Kenshuu decided to tend to him despite the risks, which caused Kenshuu to become the empress over Gabi.
Kou Tousetsu (黄 冬雪, Kō Tōsetsu)
Voiced by: Farahnaz Nikray (Japanese); Mori Calliope (English)
A court lady of the Kou clan who serves Reirin. Like Leelee, Tousetsu knows that Reirin's soul is in Keigetsu's body, having learnt that the two swapped bodies. Learning the truth causes her deep regret. Despite this, Tousetsu is told by Reirin to not do anything to Keigetsu and protect her going forward.
Kou Keikou (黄 景行, Kō Keikō)
Voiced by: Yuichi Nakamura
Reirin's oldest brother.
Kou Keishou (黄 景彰, Kō Keishō)
Voiced by: Shun'ichi Toki
Reirin's second-oldest brother.

=== Others ===
Unran (雲嵐)
Voiced by: Chiaki Kobayashi
A young man who is the leader of a village.

== Media ==
=== Light novel ===
Written by Satsuki Nakamura, Though I Am an Inept Villainess: Tale of the Butterfly-Rat Body Swap in the Maiden Court began publication on the novel posting website Shōsetsuka ni Narō on July 15, 2020. The series was later acquired and published in print by Ichijinsha with illustrations by Kana Yuki on December 28, 2020. As of September 2026, thirteen volumes have been released.

In March 2022, Seven Seas Entertainment announced that they have licensed the series for English publication.

==== Volumes ====
No.	Original release date	Original ISBN	English release date	English ISBN
1	December 28, 2020	978-4-75-809323-1	October 18, 2022	978-1-63-858637-1
2	June 2, 2021	978-4-75-809370-5	November 1, 2022	978-1-63-858767-5
3	November 2, 2021	978-4-75-809412-2	March 21, 2023	978-1-63-858976-1
4	April 4, 2022	978-4-75-809453-5	July 11, 2023	978-1-68-579652-5
5	October 4, 2022	978-4-75-809497-9	December 19, 2023	979-8-88-843085-9
6	April 4, 2023	978-4-75-809542-6	January 16, 2024	979-8-88-843117-7
7	October 3, 2023	978-4-75-809587-7	July 30, 2024	979-8-88-843817-6
8	April 2, 2024	978-4-75-809632-4	February 4, 2025	979-8-89-160669-2
9	October 2, 2024	978-4-75-809680-5	August 26, 2025	979-8-89373-969-5
10	April 2, 2025	978-4-75-809719-2	May 5, 2026	979-8-89561-928-5
11	September 30, 2025	978-4-75-809758-1	September 22, 2026	979-8-89765-996-8
12	March 31, 2026	978-4-75-809801-4; 978-4-75-809802-1 (SE)	March 9, 2027	979-8-90209-071-7
13	September 30, 2026	978-4-82-510148-7	—	—

=== Manga ===
A manga adaptation illustrated by Ei Ohitsuji, began serialization in Ichijinsha's magazine Monthly Comic Zero Sum on December 28, 2020. As of September 2026, the series' individual chapters have been collected into eleven tankōbon volumes.

Seven Seas Entertainment is also publishing the manga in English.

==== Volumes ====
No.	Original release date	Original ISBN	English release date	English ISBN
1	June 28, 2021	978-4-75-803626-9	November 8, 2022	978-1-63-858686-9
2	December 27, 2021	978-4-75-803689-4	April 18, 2023	978-1-68-579477-4
3	June 30, 2022	978-4-75-803760-0	June 20, 2023	978-1-68-579582-5
4	December 28, 2022	978-4-75-803838-6	December 26, 2023	979-8-88-843075-0
5	June 30, 2023	978-4-75-803905-5	May 21, 2024	979-8-88-843770-4
6	December 28, 2023	978-4-75-803977-2	December 17, 2024	979-8-89-160670-8
7	June 28, 2024	978-4-75-808540-3	May 13, 2025	979-8-89-373296-2
8	February 28, 2025	978-4-75-808655-4	December 16, 2025	979-8-89561-730-4
9	September 30, 2025	978-4-75-808811-4	August 4, 2026	979-8-89765-374-4
10	March 31, 2026	978-4-75-809809-0; 978-4-75-809810-6 (SE)	February 9, 2027	979-8-89863-264-9
11	September 30, 2026	978-4-82-510140-1	—	—

=== Anime ===
An anime television series adaptation was announced on March 17, 2025. It is produced by Doga Kobo and directed by Mitsue Yamazaki, with Yoshiko Nakamura handling series composition, Ai Kikuchi designing the characters, and Yukari Hashimoto composing the music. The series was originally scheduled to premiere in April 2026, but was later delayed due to production progress issues, eventually airing from July 12 to September 21, 2026, on TV Tokyo and its affiliates. The opening theme song is "Sunny", performed by Milet, while the ending theme song is "Hōkiboshi" (ホウキボシ; "Shooting Star"), performed by Rokudenashi.

Crunchyroll, Hulu (United States), Disney+ (Canada, Latin America and Europe), and Netflix (select regions of Asia) are streaming the series. An English dub produced by Bang Zoom! Studios premiered on July 26, 2026. (Note: The first episode of the English dub was inadvertently released several days before its premiere date of July 26, 2026.)

Following the airing of the final episode of the first cours, a second cours was announced, which is set to premiere in January 2027.

==== Episodes ====
No.	Title	Directed by (Note: Production staff information is taken from the ending credits of each episode.)	Storyboarded by	Original release date
Part 1
1	"Though I Am an Inept Villainess"; Transliteration: "Futsutsuka na Akujo de wa Gozaimasu ga" (Japanese: ふつつかな悪女ではございますが)	Sumie Noro	Mitsue Yamazaki	July 12, 2026
In the Ei Kingdom during the Double Sevens Festival, the Shu clan's maiden Keigetsu knocks the Kou clan's maiden Reirin unconscious. Reiren then finds herself incarcerated and inside Keigetsu's body upon awakening. Reirin attempts to tell the truth to her personal court lady Tousetsu, but the spell's effect silences her when she speaks it. Unable to plead her innocence, her verdict is to be decided by the Lion's Judgment. After Tousetsu gives Reirin a poison pill and leaves, Keigetsu speaks with Reirin telepathically through a flame, explaining that her jealousy towards Reirin led her to swapping bodies using forbidden magic. Afterwards, Reirin realizes that Keigetsu's body is very healthy in contrast to her frail original body. At the Lion's Judgment, Reirin's cousin, the Crown Prince Gyoumei, harshly reprimands "Keigetsu" for calling him cousin. Reirin is locked in a cage with a lion that refuses to attack, but does so after Shin-u, Captain of the Eagle Eyes, provokes it on Gyoumei's order. The lion faints after eating the dead rat Reirin hid after it ingested the poison pill. Having survived the judgment, she is ruled innocent, but Gyoumei warns that her hostilities towards "Reirin" will continue to haunt her.
2	"Will I Be Living Here?"; Transliteration: "Koko de, Kurasu no Desu ka?" (Japanese: ここで、暮らすのですか？)	Sho Kitamura	Mitsue Yamazaki & Moe Suzuki	July 19, 2026
After causing a commotion in the inner palace, Reirin is banished by the Shu clan's noble consort Gabi and escorted by Keigetsu's court lady Leelee to an abandoned storehouse at the border to live in. Upon arriving, Reirin expresses her excitement of being free from her busy life and frail body. Shin-u and Bunkou are sent by Gyoumei to monitor "Keigetsu" and are surprised to see her farming so enthusiastically. Meanwhile, Leelee, deprived of food as punishment for serving "Keigetsu", makes a deal with the Kin clan's court lady Gayou to torture and report on her master in exchange for food and a fancy hairpin. Leelee returns to Reirin's home to find out that she quickly created a farm and gets fed. That night, an ailing Keigetsu looks back at her life as Gabi made her a maiden seemingly out of pity after her parents committed suicide and was disrespected by her clan's court ladies, leading her to direct her jealousy towards Reirin. Keigetsu gets swarmed with work and exaggerates her illness to avoid it. Meanwhile, Leelee sneaks out of Reirin's home in the middle of the night only to return after being evicted from her living space.
3	"Shoulders Back, Look Forward"; Transliteration: "Mune o Hiroge, Shisen wa Mae ni" (Japanese: 胸を広げ、視線は前に)	Ai Hasegawa, Yukiko Tsukahara & Mitsue Yamazaki	Tetsuhito Saitō	July 26, 2026
Four days since swapping bodies, Reirin continues to enjoy her new life while preparing to meet Keigetsu at the Ghost Festival ritual in three days. Leelee begins to suspect that "Keigetsu" is not the same person she knows with her failed attempts to torture her. Leelee returns to report to Gayou, and disappointed by her effort, she orders Leelee to assassinate her or be accused of stealing her hairpin. Meanwhile, Gyoumei tell Shin-u that he suspects something after noticing "Reirin" acting differently since the Double Sevens Festival. Bunkou alerts Shin-u about Leelee's attempt to assassinate "Keigetsu". At Reirin's home, Leelee damages Reirin's garment, and then attacks Reirin before she is stopped by Shin-u. Reirin makes up a story to defend Leelee's actions, and Shin-u leaves convinced that "Keigetsu" is not the same person he knows. Afterwards, Reirin tells Leelee that she will always have a place with her, and Leelee cries as she prepares to tell her the truth about her deal with Gayou. Meanwhile, Keigetsu continues to be bedridden having had a fever in Reirin's body for five days straight.
4	"My Miracle Comet"; Transliteration: "Watakushi no, Hōkiboshi" (Japanese: わたくしの、ほうき星)	Ka Hee Im	Ka Hee Im	August 2, 2026
With her fever worsening, Keigetsu speaks telepathically with Reiren again asking for help. She also gloats about her situation, mentioning a present she got from Kin Seika. Meanwhile, Leelee is away to return the hairpin to Gayou after telling Reirin that the Kin clan's maiden Seika ordered "Keigetsu's" harassment. Reirin tells Keigetsu to adjust her breathing, as well as direct her to the proper medicine. Reiren explains that she views the comet as a miracle since she had wished to get healthy. After the conversation, Leelee returns having failed to find Gayou, and Reirin decides to take on Seika herself at the Ghost Festival hosted by the Kin clan by making extravagant garments for herself and Leelee. Meanwhile, as Gyoumei learns about "Reirin's" worsening condition, Shin-u tells him about "Keigetsu's" sudden personality change, which furthers Gyoumei's animosity towards "Keigetsu". The next day, Reirin has a new garment made for Leelee overnight for the Ghost Festival. Reirin inadvertently speaks about dressing Leelee in gamboge gold worn by Kou's upper court ladies. At the Ghost Festival, Reirin and Leelee arrive while Seika silently expresses her anger towards "Keigetsu" for interfering with her plan to become noble consort when "Reirin" becomes empress.
5	"Who Is That Girl?"; Transliteration: "Ano Onna wa Dare da" (Japanese: あの女は誰だ)	Sumie Noro	Sumie Noro	August 9, 2026
The Ghost Festival begins with Reirin and Leelee arriving with the objective of returning the hairpin to Seika. Reirin's appearance shocks Seika, who was told by Gabi that "Keigetsu" was going to be absent. The maidens perform a dance starting with the Gen clan's maiden Kasui, followed by the Ran clan's maiden Houshun with Reirin offering decorative sachet balls as prizes. Then Seika dances drawing great praise from the audience as even Gyoumei offers a prize. Reirin offers the hairpin as her prize and Leelee notices that Gayou is not present. Reirin calls out Seika when her court ladies show contempt towards Leelee. Insisting that she is simply having a conversation with Seika when Gabi calls "Keigetsu" out, Reirin makes a bet with Seika that she can dance well to continue their conversation. Reirin performs the difficult Sogdian Whirl dance to astonish the crowd. Afterwards, Seika attempts to distract Reirin by talking about her lack of prizes but fails as Reirin pressures Seika into talking about the thievery from an ivory silk lady. When Reirin asks Seika to call over Gayou, Seika reveals that she has no court lady named Gayou.
6	"I Won't Let You Die"; Transliteration: "Shinasetari Shinai" (Japanese: 死なせたりしない)	Sho Kitamura	Mitsue Yamazaki	August 16, 2026
Before Seika can elaborate about Gayou, Tousetsu suddenly arrives with news about "Reirin's" worsening condition. Reirin asks Tousetsu to visit the Kou Palace to treat Keigetsu. Reirin claims that "Keigetsu" is fond of "Reirin" and must make amends in an attempt to gain Gyoumei's trust. The empress Kenshuu accepts her request but must first gain the Kou clan's trust by shooting arrows from the Bow of Warding all night. Keigetsu continues to suffer while the incense she got as a present is burning in her room. She recalls how Gabi was amazed about her forbidden magic, though little else, and how she told her that if she were more like Reirin it would solve everything. Reirin does archery with the bow for six hours straight, causing others to become worried for her well-being. Hours later, Shin-u arrives to ask Reirin to stop shooting, but she refuses. That night, a palace guard informs Shin-u that "Reirin" is starting to recover. Reirin finally hits the bullseye and the incense pot breaks at the same time. Keigetsu regains consciousness, while Reirin faints from exhaustion. Afterwards, Reirin awakens and is greeted by Tousetsu and Leelee, with Tousetsu having figured out the truth.
7	"Meaning of Entrusting a Weapon"; Transliteration: "Buki o Sazukeru Koto no Imi" (Japanese: 武器を授けることの意味)	Shōhei Fujita	Hiroaki Yoshikawa	August 23, 2026
Tousetsu explains that she got Keigetsu to confess to the body swap after pointing out her deranged and disrespectful behavior. Having fallen for Keigetsu's deception, Tousetsu attempts to kill herself to atone, but Reirin talks her out of it. Instead, Reirin orders Tousetsu and Leelee to continue serving her and to not harm Keigetsu. Meanwhile, Keigetsu discovers that a venomcraft curse caused her heightened illness, something only she and one other is capable of. The next day, the maidens and consorts hold a tea party to celebrate "Reirin's" recovery, which was a cover to criticize Reirin's frail health, but the subject never comes up with Kenshuu controlling the conversation. Kenshuu talks about her history with Gabi as 22 years ago, they became close friends with Kenshuu supporting Gabi as the next empress. One day, the emperor fell ill and while the maidens were ordered to shelter in place, Kenshuu stayed by his side. The emperor recovered, and afterwards Kenshuu was chosen as the next empress. Kenshuu then ends the tea party. However, after everyone leaves Kenshuu collapses due to a venomcraft curse. Meanwhile, Reirin wakes up and sees the storehouse fully remodeled while she was asleep.
8	"Like a Villainess, Like a Villainess"; Transliteration: "Akujo Rashiku Akujo Rashiku" (Japanese: 悪女らしく悪女らしく)	Yukiko Tsukahara	Yūzō Satō	August 30, 2026
An exhausted Leelee tells Reirin that Tousetsu ordered her around to remodel the storehouse. Shin-u arrives to give Reirin some ointment and answers her question about the stolen hairpin and ivory silk garment from the Kin clan, which he confirms was reported a month ago, further substantiating Gayou's nonexistence. While Leelee goes outside, Reirin checks up on Keigetsu with another telepathic conversation. Keigetsu reveals that her illness was Gabi's doing, knowing it was her because only herself and Gabi can use the arachnid form of venomcraft. She also reveals that Gabi instigated the swap to secretly kill both maidens, and that Gabi made her the maiden because of her forbidden magic. Keigetsu asks Reirin to kill her, but Reirin refuses. Before Keigetsu can explain Gabi's true objective, Gyoumei's sudden arrival prompts Reirin to end the conversation. Reirin maintains her villainess act in front of Gyoumei. Shin-u suddenly arrives, informing Gyoumei that Kenshuu has collapsed with the same illness "Reirin" has.
9	"I Will Make Sure to Save You"; Transliteration: "Kanarazu o Tasuke Itashimasu" (Japanese: 必ずお助けいたします)	Shunsuke Nishimura	Hiroaki Yoshikawa & Tetsuhito Saitō	September 6, 2026
Knowing that Kenshuu's illness is a venomcraft curse, Reirin figures out that Gabi's true objective is to assassinate Kenshuu. After Gyoumei denies Reirin's request to use the Bow of Warding again, she goes off to ask Keigetsu to undo the swap to wield the bow in her original body. After she leaves, Gyoumei becomes aware of the swap. At the sealed-off Kou Palace, Leelee helps Reirin jump over the wall. Gyoumei soon arrives and is denied entry. Reirin sneaks around the palace and approaches Kenshuu before being escorted out by Tousetsu. Afterwards, Reiren meets Keigetsu in-person for the first time since the swap and asks her to undo it in order to get the bow. However, Keigetsu suggests that she gets Shin-u to use it instead. This causes Reirin to realize that she has been trying to do too much by herself. Keigetsu then suggests using a countercurse. Realizing she unknowingly produced the curse's main ingredient when Leelee tried to torture her, Reirin drags Keigetsu out of the palace to get it.
10	"Split Curses, Too"; Transliteration: "Noroi mo Hanbunko" (Japanese: 呪いも半分こ)	Kenjirō Okada	Yūki Itō	September 13, 2026
Gyoumei is let into the palace after he shows his resolve to Tousetsu while informing her that he knows about the swap. Meanwhile, Reirin brings Keigetsu to her home to retrieve the countercurse's main ingredient: a cannibalizing centipede. At the palace, Shin-u figures out about the swap after he breaks the Bow of Warding. Reirin asks Keigetsu to undo the swap, but she cannot because she lacks the energy to both do that and make the countercurse on the same day. Keigetsu soon invokes the countercurse on the spider inflicting the curse on Kenshuu, which will reflect its curse back to Gabi. As Keigetsu struggles to kill the centipede, Reirin mentions that her other wish was to make friends. She then asks Keigetsu to become her friend. Gabi suddenly arrives and holds Reirin at knifepoint, threatening to kill her if Keigetsu disobeys her orders. When Keigetsu reluctantly releases the centipede, Reirin is able to get away from a distracted Gabi. Once Reirin accidentally kills the centipede, the countercurse is reflected onto Gabi. A crazed Gabi attacks Reirin, but Gyoumei and Shin-u arrive to stop her.
11	"Quite the Villainess"; Transliteration: "Taishita Akujo Desu yo" (Japanese: たいした悪女ですよ)	Sumie Noro	Sumie Noro & Rion Matsuyama	September 21, 2026 (Note: This episode aired at midnight JST, 15 minutes after the original air time on TXN.)
Gabi recalls resenting Kenshuu when she believed Kenshuu had abandoned her after she had a miscarriage while Kenshuu gave birth to Gyoumei. In the present, Gabi is detained and escorted away. With Reirin's silencing curse lifted, she tells Gyoumei the truth about the swap and her positive experiences inhabiting Keigetsu's healthy body. Gyoumei agrees to not punish Keigetsu, to let Kenshuu decide Gabi's punishment, and to allow Reirin and Keigetsu to swap bodies again in the future as his atonement for unknowingly harming Reirin. That night, Keigetsu undoes the swap. Three days later, Gabi's trial is held, resulting in her banishment and revocation of her Noble Consort title. As Gabi prepares for her banishment, Kenshuu visits her in prison, where they reconcile before Kenshuu gives Gabi a bow to symbolize her desire to continue looking out for her. Several days later, Reirin and Keigetsu swap bodies again with Reirin returning to the storehouse and failing to fool Leelee, while Keigetsu is burdened by Reirin's workload. Meanwhile, Reirin's brothers Keikou and Keishou visit the Shu Palace, and several villagers set their sights on Keigetsu.

== Reception ==
Along with Jin Kizuki's Shinya Eigyō Kujiratei: Gozen 0-ji no Napolitan, the series won the grand prize in the light novel category at NTT Solmare's "Minna ga Erabu!! Denshi Comic Taishō 2023" competition in 2023. The series has 3 million copies in circulation.

In the 2022 Next Manga Award, the manga ranked seventh in the print category. In the 2023 edition of the Kono Manga ga Sugoi! guidebook, the series ranked seventeenth on the list of the top manga for female readers.

== See also ==
- I'll Never Set Foot in That House Again!, another light novel series with the same illustrator
