= Sleepy Princess in the Demon Castle =

Japanese manga series

- Cover of the first tankōbon volume, featuring Princess Syalis

魔王城でおやすみ (Maōjō de Oyasumi)
- Genre: Adventure; Fantasy comedy; Slice of life
- Manga
- Written by: Kagiji Kumanomata
- Published by: Shogakukan
- English publisher: NA: Viz Media
- Imprint: Shōnen Sunday Comics
- Magazine: Weekly Shōnen Sunday
- Original run: May 11, 2016 – present
- Volumes: 33
- Anime television series
- Directed by: Mitsue Yamazaki
- Written by: Yoshiko Nakamura
- Music by: Yukari Hashimoto
- Studio: Doga Kobo
- Licensed by: Crunchyroll: SA/SEA: Muse Communication
- Original network: TV Tokyo, AT-X, BS TV Tokyo
- English network: SEA: Animax Asia
- Original run: October 6, 2020 – December 22, 2020
- Episodes: 12
- icon

Sleepy Princess in the Demon Castle (Japanese: 魔王城でおやすみ, Hepburn: Maōjō de Oyasumi; lit. 'Good Night at the Demon King's Castle') is a Japanese manga series written and illustrated by Kagiji Kumanomata. It has been serialized in Shogakukan's shōnen manga magazine Weekly Shōnen Sunday magazine since May 2016, with its chapters collected in 33 tankōbon volumes as of October 2026. An anime television series adaptation produced by Doga Kobo aired from October to December 2020.

== Plot ==
The story follows Princess Syalis, a young princess who was kidnapped by the Demon King, and her quest to sleep well while imprisoned. Despite the Demon King's best attempts, the princess turns her kidnapping into a vacation; having grown tired with the stress of a royal life, she is indifferent to the situation.

== Characters ==
Princess Syalis (スヤリス姫, Suyarisu Hime)
Voiced by: Inori Minase (Japanese); Kira Buckland (English)
Princess Syalis (full name: Aurora Sya Lis Goodereste) (オーロラ・栖夜・リース・カイミーン, Ōrora Suya Rīsu Kaimīn) is a princess who was kidnapped by the demon king and causes chaos in the demon castle while trying to get a good night's sleep. She has been living at the demon king's castle for a year now due to her wishing to escape the stresses of royal life and making no attempt to escape. Before long, she begins accepting the demon castle as her new home.
Twilight the Demon King (魔王タソガレ, Maō Tasogare)
Voiced by: Yoshitsugu Matsuoka (Japanese); Alejandro Saab (English)
The leader of the demon race, who is also the one responsible for abducting Syalis. He is usually annoyed by her antics and sometimes get dragged into them. Despite being the Demon Lord, he is not all that intimidating or ruthless.
Demon Cleric (あくましゅうどうし, Akuma Shūdōshi)
Voiced by: Kaito Ishikawa (Japanese); Mike Haimoto (English)
A demon priest who has the power to bring those who were killed back to life. Most of the time, he had to revive Syalis after she accidentally kills herself or those that she killed for her own means. Like Twilight, he also sometimes gets dragged into Syalis's antics. He seems to have feelings for Syalis as he gets very jealous when anyone else demonstrates feelings for her.
Dawner the Hero (勇者アカツキ, Yūsha Akatsuki)
Voiced by: Hiro Shimono (Japanese); Nicholas Andrew Louie, Bryn Apprill (young) (English)
Dawner is the hero who is entrusted by the Human Confederation of Goodereste with the task of saving Princess Syalis from the demon castle. Although Dawner and Princess Syalis are childhood friends and also engaged, she does not remember who he is. Whenever she mentions Dawner to the denizens of the demon castle, she calls him, "Daw-What's-His-Name". Due to Dawner being outgoing and friendly to Princess Syalis, yet being incredibly clumsy and prone to mistakes, he had always annoyed her, thus causing her to have nightmares when at one point he enters her dreams. He is also known for his poor sense of direction, which explains why Princess Syalis has been captive for a year, along with her unwillingness to escape.
Quilladillo (はりとげマジロ, Hari Toge Majiro)
Voiced by: Rikiya Koyama (Japanese); Ben Lepley (English)
One of Twilight's henchmen. He resembles a porcupine.
Frankenzombie (フランケンゾンビ, Furankenzonbi)
Voiced by: Kōichi Sōma (Japanese); Jim Foronda (English)
One of Twilight's henchmen. He resembles Frankenstein's monster.
Minotaur (ミノタウロス, Minotaurosu)
Voiced by: Masashi Yamane (Japanese); Gianni Matragrano (English)
One of Twilight's henchmen.
Castle Goblin Grunt (やしき手下ゴブリン, Yashiki Teshita Goburin)
Voiced by: Shinya Takahashi (Japanese); Ricco Fajardo (English)
One of Twilight's henchmen.
Great Red Siberian (レッドシベリアン・改, Reddo Shiberian-Kai)
Voiced by: Chikahiro Kobayashi (Japanese); J. Michael Tatum (English)
Loyal retainer to the Demon Lord, in charge of enforcing rules. The princess drives him batty with her blatant disregard to the fact she is supposed to be a hostage. In fact, later in the series, he notes that the princess is costing them a fortune with all her misadventures, adding onto the woe everyone endures.
Monster Shroud (おばけふろしき, Obake Furoshiki)
Voiced by: Kōichi Sōma (Japanese); Bryce Papenbrook (English)
He and his subordinates are the principal victims of Princess Syalis's antics, especially when she needs cloth to make things to get a good sleep. The death of the Ghost Shrouds by the Princess is a common joke in the series.
Ghost Shrouds (おばけふろしき, Obake Furoshiki)
Monster Shroud's minions.
Poseidon (ポセイドン)
Voiced by: Takeo Ōtsuka (Japanese); Kevin Thelwell (English)
A demon who has dominion over water. Because Poseidon never wears a shirt, the princess labels him a nudist.
Fire Venom Dragon (かえんどくりゅう, Kaen doku Ryū)
Voiced by: Takaya Kuroda (Japanese); Jason Marnocha (English)
A demon who has dominion over fire. He always wears a mask.
Neo Alraune (ネオアルラウネ, Neo Aruraune)
Voiced by: Sayaka Ohara (Japanese); Michele Knotz (English)
A gentle plant demon, who has motherly concern for the Princess. While willing to overlook all the deaths the Cleric is forced to undo, Neo Alraune became "miffed" upon realizing her tree trunk brother was killed by the Princess as part of one her usual ridiculous sleep plans.
Alazif (アラージフ, Arājifu)
Voiced by: Ayane Sakura (Japanese); Suzie Yeung (English)
The spirit of a forbidden grimoire the princess freed by sheer dumb luck. Alazif tries encouraging Syalis to use his powers to defeat the demons and leave the castle; however, he is left severely disappointed with her due to her preoccupation with sleeping.
Scissors Sorcerer (シザーマジシャン, Shizā Majishan)
Voiced by: Junichi Suwabe (Japanese); Kyle Igneczi (English)
A demon with an arm made of scissors. Syalis gave him her crown to keep his arm together in exchange for his lost scissors; unfortunately, leading to her routine of killing the ghost shrouds.
Gearbolt (ギアボルト, Giaboruto)
Voiced by: Hōchū Ōtsuka (Japanese); Kent Williams (English)
A scientist demon.
Harpy (ハーピィ, Hāpī)
Voiced by: Ayaka Ōhashi (Japanese); Morgan Garrett (English)
A harpy who believes that the princess considers her a friend over a misunderstanding with Syalis wishing to nap on Harpy's feathers.
Hades (ハデス, Hadesu)
Voiced by: Kishō Taniyama (Japanese); Christopher Wehkamp (English)
Poseidon's older brother. Hades is always looking for chance to usurp the throne if Twilight messes up bad enough because of their mutual grudge.
Hypnos (睡魔, Suima)
Voiced by: Shin-ichiro Miki (Japanese); Robbie Daymond (English)
A sleep demon; he must sleep 20 hours a day or risk death. Hypnos was called to examine Syalis' nightmare at one point; revealing to the demons just how much the princess detests Dawner (the source of the nightmare).
Bussy/Cubey (さっきゅん, Sakkyun)
Voiced by: Ari Ozawa (Japanese); Jad Saxton (English)
A succubus who looks eerily like the princess; only she has purple hair and gold eyes. Cubey wished to learn why the princess was so popular despite looking the same, but got sucked into being trained as her double.
Queen Nemlis (カイミーンの女王, Kaimīn no Joō)
Voiced by: Saori Hayami (Japanese); Elizabeth Maxwell (English)
Nemlis (full name: Aurora Nem Lis Goodereste) (オーロラ・音無（ネム）・リース・カイミーン, Ōrora Nemu Rīsu Kaimīn) is the queen of Goodereste, a kingdom of humankind, and mother of Princess Syalis.
Teddy Demons (でびあくま, Debia Kuma)
Voiced by: Inori Minase, Saori Hayami (Japanese); Various (Note: Aimee Smith; Alyssa Dumas; Amber Lee Connors; Caleb Morphy; Laurie Jackson; Marissa Lenti; Michelle Marie; Natalie Van Sistine; Sarah Wiedenheft; Stacy Morphy; Suzie Yeung; Kira Buckland) (English)
Living teddy bears with wings. Syalis keeps one as a pet and bribes them into giving her the keys to her cell in exchange for being brushed. They soon develop a good relationship with her.
Morgen (モルゲン, Morugen)
Voiced by: Kenta Miyake (Japanese); Marc Swint (English)
A muscular paladin who works in Goodereste's castle.
Evening Star (ミョウジョウ, Myoujou)
Voiced by: Kenji Hamada (Japanese); Edward Bosco (English)
A paladin who works in Goodereste's castle. He is only awake at night and falls asleep when it is daytime.
Ker (ケル, Keru), Ber (ベロ, Bero), and Ros (スゥ, Su)
Voiced by: Shizuka Ishigami (Ker), Yukina Tomatsu (Ber), Yurie Kozakai (Ros) (Japanese); Alexis Tipton (Ker), Kara Edwards (Ber), Dawn M. Bennett (Ros) (English)
Hades' subordinates. They are a trio of wolf demons.
Tire Genie (タイヤ魔神, Taiya Majin)
A demon whose body is made of tires. Should his body be missing, he appears in gaseous form.
Ice Golem (アイスゴーレム, Aisu Gōremu)
Voiced by: Shun'ichi Maki (Japanese); Ian Sinclair (English)
A demon made of ice cubes. He is the leader of the ice demons.
Evil Tree Spirit (わるもくじん, Waru mo Kujin)
Voiced by: Tesshō Genda (Japanese); Ian Sinclair (English)
Neo's unnamed older brother who is a demon that resembles a tree stump. Even when his body is cut up, he does not die so easily.

== Media ==
=== Manga ===
Written and illustrated by Kagiji Kumanomata, Sleepy Princess in the Demon Castle started in Shogakukan's shōnen manga magazine Weekly Shōnen Sunday on May 11, 2016. Shogakukan has collected its chapters into individual tankōbon volumes. The first volume was released on September 16, 2016. As of October 16, 2026, 33 volumes have been released.

Viz Media announced in September 2017 that they had licensed the series in North America. The first volume was released on June 12, 2018. On May 9, 2023, Viz Media launched their Viz Manga digital manga service, with the series' chapters receiving simultaneous English publication in North America as they are released in Japan.

An official fanbook of the series was released on October 16, 2020.

==== Volumes ====
No.	Original release date	Original ISBN	English release date	English ISBN
1	September 16, 2016	978-4-09-127342-0	June 12, 2018	978-1-9747-0018-9
1. "Castle of the Sleepy Princess" (眠れぬ城の姫, Nemurenu Shiro no Hime); 2. "Bedsheets Like the Shining Sea" (シーツは輝く海のように, Shītsu wa Kagayaku Umi no Yō ni); 3. "Sweet Sleep Like the Dead" (死という甘い眠り, Shi to iu Amai Nemuri); 4. "Longing to Sleep on the Shield of the Wind" (風の盾で寝るしか, Kaze no Tate de Neru Shika); 5. "Because the Tower is There" (そこに塔があるから, Soko ni Tō ga Aru kara); 6. "Go Bark at the Moon" (月にでも吠えていろ, Tsuki ni demo Hoeteiro); 7. "The Poisonous Mushroom of Dreams" (夢みる毒キノコ, Yumemiru Doku Kinoko); 8. "The Princess's Three-Star Armor" (姫の三ツ星装甲, Hime no Mitsuboshi Sōkō); 9. "But You Have to Pay the Price, Right?" (でも、お高い代償なんでしょう？, Demo, Otakai Daishō Nandeshō?); 10. "Good Night, Baby" (ねむれよいこよ, Nemure Yoiko yo); 11. "Touch Her and She's Yours" (触れなば落ちぬ, Furenaba Ochinu); 12. "The Sea of Pillows and the Tower of Babel" (枕の海とバベルの塔, Makura no Umi to Baberu no Tō); 13. "Sacred Treasure Crossing: Wild World" (おいでよ神器の森, Oide yo Jingi no Mori)
2	January 18, 2017	978-4-09-127488-5	August 14, 2018	978-1-9747-0713-3
14. "The Mysterious Case of the Hot Springs Steam Monster Murders" (ゆけむり殺魔物, Yukemuri Satsu Mamono); 15. "The Pale Brute" (白い凶人, Shiroi Kyōjin); 16. "Princess Stuff It" (しまっちゃう姫様, Shimatchau Hime-sama); 17. "It Looks like a Princess and Has the Brain of a Princess" (見た目は姫 頭脳も姫, Mita Me wa Hime, Zunō mo Hime); 18. "Comforter = Friend" (布団(トモダチ), Tomodachi); 19. "Extreme Training Tournament of Monsters" (ドキッ！魔物だらけの修練大会, Doki! Mamono-darake no Shūren Taikai); 20. "The Bloom Quickly Fades from the Flower" (花の命は短くて, Hana no Inochi wa Mijikakute); 21. "Squeezing Honey out of Nothing?" (なぜ蜂蜜は無から生まれないの, Naze Hachimitsu wa Mu kara Umarenai no); 22. "The Guardian of Quality Sleep" (安眠の番人, Anmin no Bannin); 23. "See You Tonight" (今夜、会いに行きます, Kon'ya, Ai ni Ikimasu); 24. "My Way of Laundry" (我が道のお洗濯, Waga Michi no O-sentaku); 25. "From Cradle to Grave" (揺りかごで墓場まで, Yurikago de Hakaba made); 26. "Demon Castle Paralysis" (魔王城（金）縛りプレイ, Maō-jō (Kana) Shibari Purei)
3	April 18, 2017	978-4-09-127560-8	October 9, 2018	978-1-9747-0020-2
27. "Sloth Generator" (なまけもの製造機, Namakemo no Seizōki); 28. "Fluffy Comforter Taxi" (ゆるふわ布団タクシー, Yurufuwa Futon Takushī); 29. "The Princess's Undergarments" (姫のぱんつはイイパンツ, Hime no Pantsu wa Ii Pantsu); 30. "Let's Remodel Your Window!" (窓をアップデートできます!, Mado o Appudēto Dekimasu!); 31. "It's Not That Bad Getting Fused with a Cat, Is It?" (猫と混ざっても、いいんじゃないッ?, Neko to Mazattemo, Iin ja Nai?); 32. "Naughty or Nice Princess" (ひめはわるいこだから, Hime wa Warui Ko dakara); 33. "Don't Take Party Games Too Seriously!" (パーティーゲームに本気になるのやめろよ!, Pātī Gēmu ni Honki ni Naru no Yamero yo!); 34. "Puffy ♡ Princess" (もちもち♡プリンセス, Mochi Mochi♡Purinsesu); 35. "Sleeping Out on the Demon Castle Grounds" (魔王城周辺でおやすみ, Maō-jō Shūhen de Oyasumi); 36. "The Divine Move in Her Dreams" (神の一手インドリーム, Kami no Itte In Dorīmu); 37. "The Perfect Happy Hostage" (完壁で幸福な人質, Kanpeki de Kōfuku na Hitojichi); 38. "Demon King–Sleep or Die" (魔王様スリープ オア ダイ, Maō-sama Surīpu Oa Dai); 39. "You Mustn't Hide It" (隠すなんてよくないよ, Kakusu Nante Yokunai yo)
4	July 18, 2017	978-4-09-127669-8	December 11, 2018	978-1-9747-0148-3
40. "Chocolate Is the Color of Love" (チョコは血の色 愛の色, Choko wa Chi no Iro, Ai no Iro); 41. "Quilly Doesn't Hibernate" (とげちゃんは眠らない, Toge-chan wa Nemuranai); 42. "Who's Been Sleeping Too Much?" (ねすぎるこ だれだ, Ne Sugiru Ko, Dare da); 43. "Attack of the Teddy Demon Subspecies!" (強襲!! でびあくま亜種, Kyōshū!! Debi Akuma Ashu); 44. "Let's Have a Sing-Along" (つくってうたお, Tsukette Utao); 45. "The Princess Goes Demon Castle Hopping" (魔王城をハシゴする女, Maō-jō o Hashigo Suru Onna); 46. "It Seems There Is a Specialist for Everything" (なんにでもプロっているんだね, Nannidemo Puro-tte Irunda ne); 47. "Retrieve the Princess (A Demon Castle Monster)" (姫（魔王城モンスター）をとりもどせ, Hime (Maō-jō Monsutā) o Torimodose); 48. "Extreme Training Magic Tournament of Monsters" (ドキドキッ！ 魔物だらけの魔術大会, Dokidoki! Mamono-darake no Majutsu Taikai); 49. "Better Living Through Gadgets" (便利グッズで一山当てたい, Benri Guzzu de Hitoyama Atetai); 50. "The Princess Doesn't Only Dance at Meetings" (会議でなくとも姫は踊る, Kaigi de Naku tomo Hime wa Odoru); 51. "Pollenella" (花粉かぶり姫, Kafun Kaburi Hime); 52. "Not Fair Play!" (その攻略法ズルだと思います！, Sono Kōryaku-hō Zuru da to Omoimasu!); Bonus Chapter: "Sleepy Princess in Komi's House" (古見さんちでおやすみ, Komi-san Chi de Oyasumi) Bonus Chapter: "Not Everything That Looks Tasty Is..." (差し入れとみせかけて, Sashiire to Misekakete)
5	October 18, 2017	978-4-09-127860-9	February 12, 2019	978-1-9747-0149-0
53. ""Rockin' Till the Break of Daw-What's-His-Name"" (春眠アなんとかを覚えず, Shunmin A- Nantoka o Oboezu); 54. "It's Like Female Bonding" (それは女の友情のように, Sore wa Onna no Yūjō no Yō ni); 55. "The Princess's Marvelous Pillow Boutique ♡" (姫のすてきなまくらやさん♡, Hime no Suteki na Makuraya-san ♡); 56. "The Secret Garden at the End of Endurance" (ガマンの先の花園, Gaman no Saki no Hanazono); 57. "No One Did Anything Wrong ♡" (だあれもわるくないよ♡, Dāremo Warukunai yo ♡); 58. "From the Mouths of Princesses" (姫のびんかんなおくち, Hime no Binkan na O-kuchi); 59. "Supersize My Demon Castle" (スーパーサイズfor魔王城, Sūpāsaizu fō Maō-jō); 60. "No Fair Calling In a Grown-Up!" (大人呼ぶのは反則だろうが, Otona Yobu no wa Hansoku darōga); 61. "Radically Transforming Giant Eggplant Seal" (劇変!ビッグナスあざらし, Gekihen! Biggu Nasu Azarashi); 62. "Togetherness with Big Sister Syalis" (すやりすお姉ちゃんといっしょ, Suyarisu Onē-chan to Issho); 63. "Don't Look Away" (その瞳をそらさないで, Sono Me o Sorasanaide); 64. "Full-Time Sweatshop Princess" (ブラックフルタイムひめさま, Burakku Furu Taimu Hime-sama); 65. "One Person's Mistake Is Not Another's Lesson" (人のふり見てわがふりなおすと思うのかよ, Hito no Furi Mite Waga Furi Naosu to Omou no ka yo)
6	January 18, 2018	978-4-09-128073-2	April 9, 2019	978-1-9747-0227-5
Chapters 66–78
7	April 12, 2018	978-4-09-128227-9	June 11, 2019	978-1-9747-0514-6
Chapters 79–91
8	August 17, 2018	978-4-09-128381-8	August 13, 2019	978-1-9747-0783-6
Chapters 92–104
9	November 16, 2018	978-4-09-128577-5	October 8, 2019	978-1-9747-0881-9
Chapters 105–117
10	February 18, 2019	978-4-09-128801-1	December 10, 2019	978-1-9747-0960-1
Chapters 118–130
11	May 17, 2019	978-4-09-129157-8	April 14, 2020	978-1-9747-1261-8
Chapters 131–143
12	September 18, 2019	978-4-09-129332-9	June 9, 2020	978-1-9747-1539-8
Chapters 144–156
13	January 17, 2020	978-4-09-129546-0	October 13, 2020	978-1-9747-1817-7
Chapters 157–169
14	April 16, 2020	978-4-09-129563-7	April 13, 2021	978-1-9747-1980-8
Chapters 170–182
15	July 17, 2020	978-4-09-850162-5	August 10, 2021	978-1-9747-2365-2
Chapters 183–195
16	October 16, 2020	978-4-09-850270-7	December 14, 2021	978-1-9747-2409-3
Chapters 196–208
17	December 18, 2020	978-4-09-850366-7	April 12, 2022	978-1-9747-2539-7
Chapters 209–221
18	May 18, 2021	978-4-09-850525-8	July 19, 2022	978-1-9747-3101-5
Chapters 222–234
19	August 18, 2021	978-4-09-850640-8	November 8, 2022	978-1-9747-3229-6
Chapters 235–247
20	November 18, 2021	978-4-09-850729-0	April 11, 2023	978-1-9747-3423-8
Chapters 248–260
21	March 17, 2022	978-4-09-850869-3	August 8, 2023	978-1-9747-3637-9
Chapters 261–273
22	June 17, 2022	978-4-09-851146-4	November 14, 2023	978-1-9747-4132-8
Chapters 274–286
23	October 18, 2022	978-4-09-851346-8	February 13, 2024	978-1-9747-4309-4
Chapters 287–299; Bonus Chapter
24	March 16, 2023	978-4-09-851772-5	June 11, 2024	978-1-9747-4568-5
Chapters 300–312; Bonus Chapter
25	July 18, 2023	978-4-09-852613-0	August 13, 2024	978-1-9747-4635-4
Chapters 313–325; Bonus Chapter
26	November 17, 2023	978-4-09-853013-7	October 8, 2024	978-1-9747-4913-3
Chapters 326–338
27	March 18, 2024	978-4-09-853177-6	March 11, 2025	978-1-9747-5253-9
Chapters 339–351
28	September 18, 2024	978-4-09-853573-6	July 8, 2025	978-1-9747-5592-9
Chapters 352–364
29	February 18, 2025	978-4-09-854008-2	March 10, 2026	978-1-9747-6161-6
Chapters 365–377
30	August 18, 2025	978-4-09-854215-4	June 9, 2026	978-1-9747-1664-7
Chapters 378–390
31	January 16, 2026	978-4-09-854415-8	February 9, 2027	978-1-9747-6999-5
Chapters 391–403
32	May 18, 2026	978-4-09-854583-4	—	—
Chapters 404–417
33	October 16, 2026	978-4-09-854858-3	—	—

=== Anime ===
An anime television series adaptation was announced in Weekly Shōnen Sunday in September 2019. The series was animated by Doga Kobo and directed by Mitsue Yamazaki, with Yoshiko Nakamura handling series composition and Ai Kikuchi designing the characters. Yukari Hashimoto composed the series' music. The series ran for 12 episodes from October 6 to December 22, 2020, on TV Tokyo, AT-X, and BS TV Tokyo. (Note: TV Tokyo listed the series premiere on October 5 at 26:00, effectively October 6 at 2:00 a.m. JST) Inori Minase performed the opening theme "Kaimin! Anmin! Syalist Seikatsu" (快眠！安眠！スヤリスト生活; lit. 'Sleep! A Good Night's Sleep! Syalist Life'), while Oresama performed the ending theme "Gimmme!".

Funimation acquired the series and streamed it on its website in North America and the British Isles. On February 21, 2021, Funimation announced the series would receive an English dub, with the first episode premiering the next day. Following Sony's acquisition of Crunchyroll, the series was moved to Crunchyroll. In Southeast Asia and South Asia, the anime is licensed by Muse Communication, and released on Bilibili in Southeast Asia. The series premiered on Animax Asia on May 12, 2021.

==== Episodes ====
No.	Title (Note: All English titles are taken from Funimation.)	Directed by	Written by	Original release date
1	"Sleepless Princess of the Castle"; Transliteration: "Nemurenu Shiro no Hime" (Japanese: 眠れぬ城の姫)	Mitsue Yamazaki	Yoshiko Nakamura	October 6, 2020
Demon King Twilight attacks the kingdom of Goodereste and abducts Princess Syalis to force a surrender. While the hero Dawner attempts a rescue, the imprisoned Syalis shows no interest in escaping, instead focusing on perfecting her sleep. Finding her pillow inadequate, she barters with Teddy Demons for their fluff and later crafts a new pillow from a Quilladillo's quills. She trades her crown to the Scissors Sorcerer for materials to make a comfortable headband. To obtain a soft bedsheet, she leaves her cell and procures cloth from a Ghost Shroud. Seeking silence, she acquires a wind amulet from the castle treasury. After a fatal fall into lava, she is revived by the demon priest Cleric. Syalis then converts a coffin from his church into a soundproof bed, refining it with his horns and slime before sleeping inside it. Her constant slumber prevents Twilight from confronting her, while Dawner's mission is continually thwarted by the demon army's strength.
2	"The Princess and Furious Fluff"; Transliteration: "Hime to Ikari no Mofumofu" (Japanese: 姫と怒りのモフモフ)	Sumie Noro	Yoshiko Nakamura	October 13, 2020
Princess Syalis, seeking to eliminate bugs from her cell, creates a mosquito net. She procures the cloth by confronting the Monster Shroud, its leader, and uses string from the material to attach it to a nearby Phoenix nest. To reach the nest, she tricks a Stamp Cat out of its wall-walking shoes. Demon King Twilight intercepts her, suspecting she is stealing Phoenix eggs to aid her rescuer, the hero Dawner, who is currently struggling against a Sand Dragon. However, Syalis only ties her net to the nest, using its power to heal her bug bites before returning to her cell to sleep. Her subsequent attempts to find better sleep include taking a sleeping potion from a meeting and unknowingly lying on poisonous mushrooms, the latter requiring another revival from the demon priest Cleric. After Great Red Siberian, Twilight's retainer, catches her taking a potion from the item storage, she is forced to return all confiscated items except a pet Teddy Demon. Twilight grows increasingly frustrated as she falls asleep during his lectures, and he resists the urge to cut off the beard she finds comfortable.
3	"The Princess and Forbidden Knowledge"; Transliteration: "Hime to Kindan no Arekore" (Japanese: 姫と禁断の叡智)	Mariachi Hug Yu	Yoshiko Nakamura	October 20, 2020
Learning of grimoires within the castle, Princess Syalis searches the library for a sleep aid and accidentally releases Alazif, a spirit who wishes to destroy the demons. Uninterested in conquest, Syalis only wants to sleep, so Alazif teaches her a spell that puts the entire castle to sleep. Syalis uses the grimoires as a bed, frustrating Alazif, who nevertheless supports her. Still sleepless, Syalis seeks acupressure and, after a Teddy Demon fails, Twilight himself is convinced to perform the task. Later, desiring sunlight due to the eternal night, Syalis notices a glow in the forest. She evades the castle's traps, and the demons realize she is heading for Twilight's ultimate weapon, a glowing sword, fearing she aids the hero Dawner. Instead, she returns willingly and uses the sword and a cloth to craft a makeshift sun in her cell, finally achieving better sleep. Meanwhile, Dawner's party continues its difficult advance toward the castle.
4	"The Princess, Destruction, and a Short Journey"; Transliteration: "Hime to Hakai to Chīsana Bōken" (Japanese: 姫と破壊と小さな冒険)	Geisei Morita	Michihiro Tsuchiya	October 27, 2020
After her tub breaks, Princess Syalis commandeers the castle's public bathwater for her cell and uses a Rocket Turtle's shell as a new tub, for which Great Red Siberian punishes her by making her reassemble the turtle. Seeking relief from high temperatures, she travels to the Ice Area using a Tire Genie for insulation. Mistaken for their leader, she tricks the ice demons into building an igloo in her cell using the real Ice Golem's body, an act for which she is again punished with reassembly duty. Later, Syalis accidentally shrinks herself with a magical artifact, becoming unable to carry her belongings. The castle inhabitants play with the miniature princess, who futilely tries to get them to return her to her cell before falling asleep, eventually returning to normal size.
5	"The Princess and Female Warriors"; Transliteration: "Hime to Tatakau On'na-tachi" (Japanese: 姫と戦う女たち)	Sumie Noro, Takaharu Ōkuma	Yoshiko Nakamura	November 3, 2020
A group of female demons, including a young harpy named Harpy, returns from the war. Harpy wishes to befriend the captive Princess Syalis, who eventually agrees solely to use Harpy's wings as a comforter. Seeking a better mattress, Syalis has Harpy carry her to the castle's giant horns, which are surprisingly soft. She cuts them open to harvest their fluff for her bedding, later returning the material to a displeased Twilight. Meanwhile, the hero Dawner's party finally defeats the Sand Dragon. As Twilight convenes a war council, Syalis disrupts the meeting with her antics and is dismissed. The demons then witness her cutting up the tree-stump-like brother of Neo Alraune for a makeshift bed, though he is unharmed. Neo Alraune visits her the following day.
6	"The Princess' Unwavering Choice"; Transliteration: "Hime no Mayoi Naki Sentaku" (Japanese: 姫の迷いなき選択)	Tatsuya Nokimori	Michihiro Tsuchiya	November 10, 2020
After staining her bedsheet, Princess Syalis cleans it using water from an underwater fountain and a bubble soldier as soap. She then dries it with a magnetic staff and Professor Gearbolt's robot, which is destroyed in the process, leading to another punishment from Great Red Siberian. Syalis later secretly crafts woolen underwear, causing concern among the demons who mistake her actions for mischief. Meanwhile, Twilight, learning the hero Dawner has a poor sense of direction, approves Gearbolt's plan to guide him. Gearbolt builds a new robot modeled after Syalis, but when Twilight investigates a presumed attack, he finds her sleeping. Unable to sleep herself, Syalis attempts to help the overworked Twilight rest, eventually succeeding by patting him to sleep as her mother did for her, after which Teddy Demons return her to her cell. Dawner, having never encountered the robot, gets lost and ends up back in Goodereste.
7	"Even More Sleepless Princess of the Castle"; Transliteration: "Motto Nemurenu Shiro no Hime" (Japanese: もっと眠れぬ城の姫)	Yoshiyuki Shirahata, Mitsue Yamazaki, Sumie Noro	Yoshiko Nakamura	November 17, 2020
Princess Syalis is abducted from her cell by Hades, who intends to use her to claim a throne. Unconcerned with the political threat but needing to remake her bed, she escapes her temporary prison and coerces Hades' underlings into assisting her. While Twilight distracts Hades via a communication screen, Syalis steals his clothes. She then disables the booby traps in Hades' domain by removing their power source and consults the dormant demon Hypnos for sleeping advice. Using the deactivated traps and materials from a magician's workshop, including coats, she constructs a makeshift flying bed. As Twilight confronts Hades in a planned rescue, they both witness Syalis flying back to the Demon Castle on her creation, forcing them to abort their battle and follow her. She resumes sleeping peacefully in her original cell.
8	"The Princess and the Frightful Demon Nightmare"; Transliteration: "Hime to Mazoku no Osorubeki Akumu" (Japanese: 姫と魔族の恐るべき悪夢)	Geisei Morita	Michihiro Tsuchiya	November 24, 2020
A mage in Dawner's party opens a small portal to Princess Syalis, but it only allows Dawner to poke her head before collapsing. Learning of this, Twilight dispatches the Fire Venom Dragon to eliminate the hero. Syalis interrupts a war council to describe a nightmare about her clumsy childhood friend, whom she does not name but reveals was her former fiancé. Cleric deduces this is Dawner and reinforces the kill order. After a dental visit where a Teddy Demon helps cure her cavities, Syalis falls asleep. The Fire Venom Dragon is then defeated by Dawner's group because his combat items were unknowingly swapped due to Syalis's earlier antics. The demons, blaming her, are forced to restrain the enraged Fire Venom Dragon from attacking the princess as the heroes proceed.
9	"The Princess and Hostage Training Week"; Transliteration: "Hime to Hitojichi Kyōka Shūkan" (Japanese: 姫と人質強化週間)	Hitomi Ezoe	Michihiro Tsuchiya	December 1, 2020
Failing to order a water bed, Princess Syalis decides to construct one herself. The demons, frustrated by her constant resourcefulness, attempt to treat her as a conventional hostage by ignoring her, but they are ultimately forced to assist her gathering efforts. They then try to occupy her with work, yet she completes all the assigned paperwork in a single day. After capturing human bandits, Twilight uses them to demonstrate proper hostage behavior. Syalis complies but exaggerates the role so extremely it results in another demonic setback, despite her maintaining the act. Later, she reflects on the seemingly pointless conflict between humans and demons.
10	"The Princess in Endopolis"; Transliteration: "Hime to Owarino Shiti" (Japanese: 姫とオワリノシティ)	Tatsuya Nokimori	Yoshiko Nakamura	December 8, 2020
Seeking a new massage pillow, Princess Syalis breaks out of the Demon Castle, prompting a pursuit. The demons eventually capture her using a caged bed and, after learning her goal, reluctantly agree to help. Disguising themselves, they escort her to a human town fair. Following various antics, Syalis falls asleep. The group acquires the pillow and watches fireworks, though she struggles to sleep through them, and the demons carry her back to the castle. The next day, she lets the Teddy Demons try the new pillow while other demons enjoy souvenirs from the fair.
11	"The Princess and Troubling Dreams"; Transliteration: "Hime no Nemurenai Yume" (Japanese: 姫の眠れない夢)	Sumie Noro	Michihiro Tsuchiya	December 15, 2020 (Note: This episode did not air on the scheduled date as TV Tokyo live broadcast the 2020 U.S. Women's Open, which was delayed due to heavy rain. The episode was still released in time on streaming platforms and aired on TV Tokyo on December 22, 2020 alongside episode 12.)
After Twilight warns the hero Dawner to take the left fork in the road, Harpy visits Princess Syalis, prompting a plan for a pajama party. A practice session with Twilight goes poorly, inciting Cleric's jealousy and forcing its cancellation. The succubus Bussy, who resembles Syalis, wishes to emulate her popularity, but the princess renames her Cubey and attempts to train her as a body double through violent methods, resulting in another fatal lava incident requiring Cleric's revival. Later, plagued by nightmares, Syalis receives help from Hypnos, whose dream-reading reveals her past attempts to ignore Dawner. Twilight discovers he accidentally left a Dream Travel Slip spell for Dawner, which allowed the hero to intrude on her dreams. After retrieving the spell, Twilight enables Syalis to sleep peacefully and upgrades the castle's construction zone to a super hard mode. She awakens to find a cake left in her cell.
12	"Sleeping Princess of the Demon Castle"; Transliteration: "Maōjō no Nemuri Hime" (Japanese: 魔王城の眠り姫)	Mitsue Yamazaki, Sumie Noro	Yoshiko Nakamura	December 22, 2020
During Christmas, Princess Syalis expresses a desire to return to Goodereste to retrieve woolen underwear. Twilight and Cleric reluctantly teleport her to her old bedroom, hiding in a closet when her mother, Queen Nemlis, arrives. Finding the disguised succubus Cubey in the bed, Nemlis mistakes her for Syalis and presents her to the kingdom as the rescued princess. The demons, disguised as the paladin Morgan, attempt to retrieve Cubey but are exposed by Evening Star, another paladin who falls asleep at sunrise. During the public announcement, the real Syalis, in disguise, helps Cubey deliver a speech, then poses as the Demon King to "re-abduct" the princess, with Twilight and Cleric carrying them both back to the castle. Queen Nemlis recognizes her daughter and is secretly proud. After a belated Christmas celebration, the demons return for the forgotten underwear, which Syalis shares with the Teddy Demons before falling asleep.

== Reception ==
In 2017, the series was ranked 16th at the third Next Manga Awards in the print category.

Anime News Network's staff included Sleepy Princess in the Demon Castle on their top 5 best anime list of 2020: Rebecca Silverman placed it at number four, praising the way the source manga gets cherry-picked and comes together as a whole, concluding that: "It's not only funny, but also one of the best adaptations I've seen, and I can't wait to start rewatching it as soon as it ends." Caitlin Moore placed it at number five, praising Mitsue Yamazaki and Yoshiko Nakamura for adapting the "already funny source material, tweaking the jokes, and incorporating split-second comic timing to make it outright hilarious."
