= I'll Never Set Foot in That House Again! =

Japanese light novel series

- First light novel volume cover

二度と家には帰りません！ (Nidoto Ie ni wa Kaerimasen!)
- Genre: Fantasy
- Novel series
- Written by: Milligram
- Published by: Shōsetsuka ni Narō
- Original run: May 29, 2019 – present
- Light novel
- Written by: Milligram
- Illustrated by: YukiKana
- Published by: Overlap
- English publisher: NA: J-Novel Club
- Imprint: Overlap Novels f
- Original run: April 25, 2020 – present
- Volumes: 7
- Manga
- Written by: Milligram
- Illustrated by: Jirou Yuuki
- Published by: Overlap
- English publisher: NA: J-Novel Club
- Imprint: Gardo Comics
- Magazine: Comic Gardo
- Original run: March 27, 2020 – present
- Volumes: 10

I'll Never Set Foot in That House Again! (二度と家には帰りません！, Nidoto Ie ni wa Kaerimasen!) is a Japanese light novel series written by Milligram and illustrated by YukiKana. It began serialization on the user-generated novel publishing website Shōsetsuka ni Narō in May 2019. It was later acquired by Overlap who began publishing it under their Overlap Novels f imprint in April 2020. A manga adaptation illustrated by Jirou Yuuki began serialization on Overlap's Comic Gardo manga website in March 2020.

== Media ==
=== Light novel ===
Written by Milligram, I'll Never Set Foot in That House Again! began serialization on the user-generated novel publishing website Shōsetsuka ni Narō on May 29, 2019. It was later acquired by Overlap who began releasing it with illustrations by YukiKana under their Overlap Novels f light novel imprint on April 25, 2020. Seven volumes have been released as of January 2025. The series is licensed in North America by J-Novel Club.

No.	Original release date	Original ISBN	North American release date	North American ISBN
1	April 25, 2020	978-4-86554-650-7	November 10, 2020	978-1-7183-4898-1
2	September 25, 2020	978-4-86554-746-7	February 15, 2021	978-1-7183-4900-1
3	March 25, 2021	978-4-86554-872-3	January 5, 2022	978-1-7183-4902-5
4	November 25, 2021	978-4-8240-0049-1	May 5, 2022	978-1-7183-4904-9
5	March 25, 2022	978-4-8240-0136-8	December 19, 2022	978-1-7183-4906-3
6	January 25, 2023	978-4-8240-0393-5	August 21, 2023	978-1-7183-4908-7
7	January 25, 2025	978-4-8240-1062-9	September 24, 2025	978-1-7183-4916-2

=== Manga ===
A manga adaptation illustrated by Jirou Yuuki began serialization on Overlap's Comic Gardo manga service on March 27, 2020. The manga's chapters have been collected into ten tankōbon volumes as of June 2026. The manga adaptation is also licensed in North America by J-Novel Club.

No.	Original release date	Original ISBN	North American release date	North American ISBN
1	September 25, 2020	978-4-86554-749-8	September 6, 2023	978-1-7183-4974-2
2	February 25, 2021	978-4-86554-860-0	December 6, 2023	978-1-7183-4975-9
3	August 25, 2021	978-4-86554-994-2	February 28, 2024	978-1-7183-4976-6
4	April 25, 2022	978-4-8240-0176-4	June 19, 2024	978-1-7183-4977-3
5	December 25, 2022	978-4-8240-0377-5	October 9, 2024	978-1-7183-4978-0
6	August 25, 2023	978-4-8240-0600-4	January 29, 2025	978-1-7183-4979-7
7	May 25, 2024	978-4-8240-0843-5	July 9, 2025	978-1-7183-4980-3
8	January 25, 2025	978-4-8240-1071-1	December 10, 2025	—
9	September 25, 2025	978-4-8240-1359-0	—	—
10	June 8, 2026	978-4-8240-1668-3	—	—

== See also ==
- Though I Am an Inept Villainess, another light novel series with the same illustrator
