= Zenshu (TV series) =

Japanese anime television series

- Key visual
- 全修。
- Type: TV series
- Genre: Isekai
- Creators: Mitsue Yamazaki; Kimiko Ueno; MAPPA
- Director: Mitsue Yamazaki
- Screenplay: Kimiko Ueno
- Character designer: Kayoko Ishikawa
- Music: Yukari Hashimoto
- Voices: Anna Nagase; Kazuki Ura; Rie Kugimiya; Minori Suzuki; Akio Suyama
- Opening themes: "Zen" by Band-Maid
- Ending themes: "Tada, Kimi no Mama de" (ただ、君のままで) by Sou
- Country of origin: Japan
- Original language: Japanese
- No. of episodes: 12

Production
- Sound director: dugout
- Art director: Akio Shimada
- Cinematographer: Kenta Fujita
- Color designer: Junko Suenaga (Note: with Ayako Suenaga as assistance)
- CG director: Yurie Suzuki
- Editor: Mutsumi Takemiya
- Animation producer: Takahiro Ogawa
- Studio: MAPPA
- Producers: Kenta Oda; Mika Hagiwara; Mirai Yamauchi; Takanori Hosaka; Tomokazu Ikeda; Yō Katayama
- Production companies: Zenshu (Note: Label consisting of various companies.)

Original release
- Networks: TXN (TV Tokyo), BS TV Tokyo, AT-X
- Release: January 5 – March 23, 2025

Zenshu (Japanese: 全修。; lit. 'Fix All') is an original Japanese anime television series produced by MAPPA. It is directed by Mitsue Yamazaki and written by Kimiko Ueno, with Sumie Noro serving as assistant director and Yukari Hashimoto composing the music. Original character designs are provided by Yoshiteru Tsujino, while Kayoko Ishikawa adapts the designs for animation. The series aired from January 5 to March 23, 2025, on TV Tokyo and its affiliates. The opening theme song is "Zen", performed by Band-Maid, while the ending theme song is "Tada, Kimi no Mama de" (ただ、君のままで), performed by Sou. Crunchyroll streams the series.

== Premise ==
The series centers on Natsuko Hirose, a prodigious director and animator. While struggling with the storyboard of her latest project, she reads a newspaper article that says the director of A Tale of Perishing, a critical flop, but her favorite anime movie nonetheless, died of food poisoning, only to suffer the same fate moments later.

Waking up in the world of A Tale of Perishing, she discovers that she has the power to bring her animations to life, in order to alter the tragic storyline and bring hope to the world of the anime that inspired her to pursue animation as a child.

== Characters ==
Natsuko Hirose (広瀬ナツ子, Hirose Natsuko)
Voiced by: Anna Nagase (Japanese); Madeleine Morris (English)
A lone-wolf animator who got food poisoning and awakens in a world based on her favorite childhood anime film A Tale of Perishing. She discovers that her pegboard came along with her, which allows her to summon drawings to aid the Nine Soldiers in battle. Natsuko often has her face covered with her hair, leading the team to call her a "gremlin". She initially tries to take things on herself, which was her major flaw in reality. She slowly learns the importance of trusting others and opening herself up to love. This leads her to becoming friends with the Nine Soldiers (and other characters in the world), and ultimately realizing she is in love with Luke Braveheart.
Luke Braveheart (ルーク・ブレイブハート, Rūku Bureibuhāto)
Voiced by: Kazuki Ura (Japanese); Ryan Negrón (English)
The main protagonist of A Tale of Perishing and the leader of the Nine Soldiers. He initially cold and skeptical towards Natsuko after thinking that she is a gremlin, but his views towards her changes upon seeing her unbelievable powers and that she's really a human being. However, he soon begins to warm up to her; this leads to him cooking for her, trying different hairstyles while she's sleeping, and ultimately falling in love with her. Luke often has a heavy burden of being the hero, which is emphasized towards the end of the show as everything is collapsing. Luke begins to fall into despair when he thought all his friends had been lost in the final battle, which leads him to fulfill the original movie plot of becoming the Ultimate Void.
Unio (ユニオ, Yunio)
Voiced by: Rie Kugimiya (Japanese); Luci Christian (English)
A small unicorn-like creature and a member of the Nine Soldiers. He can transform into a flying unicorn, but loses this ability when he temporarily loses his horn. Unio is often at odds with Natsuko, frequently calling her a gremlin and being exasperated as her relationship with Luke progresses. They often get into heated arguments, and Unio almost always sees Natsuko as a threat to himself and his friends; however, it may be because he is jealous of Natsuko's relationship with Luke. Unio is able to use support magic, often providing shields during combat or healing people outside of combat. He knows a self-destruct spell, which he uses in the original movie; however this opportunity is interrupted twice during the show by Natsuko.
Memmeln (メメルン, Memerun)
Voiced by: Minori Suzuki (Japanese); Alexis Tipton (English)
A female elf who is a member of the Nine Soldiers. She is skilled with a bow and arrow, which can shoot multiple shots. She also can use magic to temporarily hold an enemy. She is often more stoic in nature, but this is revealed that she is hiding the pain she has from seeing centuries of loss. In the movie Memmeln is part of a Voidist cult that seeks to summon the Ultimate Void. This process is stopped by Natsuko and Luke; during this Natsuko drew Sir Exister, an idol from an anime her studio produced. Memmeln quickly becomes a "stan" of Sir Exister, and becomes more hopeful throughout the remainder of the show.
QJ
Voiced by: Akio Suyama (Japanese); Derick Snow (English)
A flying robot who is a member of the Nine Soldiers. He can analyze situations and give advice, and can also fire lasers at enemies. He and Memmeln are the only members who do not have any personal issues towards Natsuko. In the ninth episode, he sacrifices himself to destroy a powerful Void after learning the original movie plot from Natsuko. However later he is revived by two of Memmeln's friends. QJ was the only member of the Nine Soldiers to avoid death in the movie.
Justice
Voiced by: Romi Park (Japanese); Corey Wilder (English)
A dragon who was once a member of the Nine Soldiers, having quit due to being injured in battle and cannot fly for long due to their damaged wing. They hid their injuries from Luke for fear of adding more burden. They turned to drinking to help cover up their despair. However after meeting Natsuko and Destiny, Justice's attitude changes and he becomes a more engaged fighter again. He helps Natsuko by having her desk on his back and flying. Justice tends to flirt with individuals, but it is implied that there is a connection between him and Destiny by the end of the show. He got the nickname "Justy Bunch" from Destiny, which he is initially annoyed with but comes to term with.
Destiny Heartwarming
Voiced by: Manaka Iwami (Japanese); Dani Chambers (English)
The mayor's daughter and Luke's love interest in the movie. Her original character is the stereotypical damsel-in-distress. She was engaged to a rich chairman to help fund an orphanage, but falls in love with Luke at Unio's funeral. She ultimately dies after being impaled by a Void which causes Luke to spiral into despair. In the alternate story she originally has a connection with Luke. However after seeing an animation that Natsuko summoned, Serval Cat Mask, she becomes inspired to be more independent and starts the Serval Cat House orphanage on her own. She also forms a friendship with Natsuko, but does not become a rival in love for Luke. Later Justice also helps as a teacher at the orphanage.
Chingosman
Voiced by: Kentaro Tone
A tree-like former member of the Nine Soldiers who was killed prior to the events of the series, but was revived at the end.
Ganger
Voiced by: Masashi Yamane
A golem-like character who was originally a member of the Nine Soldiers. He was killed prior to the events of the series, but was revived at the end.
Capitan
Voiced by: Katsuhisa Hōki
A former member of the Nine Soldiers who was killed prior to the events of the series, but was revived at the end.
Admiral Merfolk
Voiced by: Sayaka Ohara
A former member of the Nine Soldiers who was killed prior to the events of the series, but was revived at the end.
Elder Baobab
A tree-folk elder who guides the people of the Last Town. She often talks about destiny and hope.
Naomi
A bar matron who was based on president of the studio that Natsuko and Director Tsuruyama worked at.
Serval Cat Mask
A wrestler character who wears a tiger mask. Natsuko created him to fight a Void. Destiny idolizes him. He is a reference of the series Tiger Mask.
Sir Exister
A handsome man from an anime called Uta-Men. He was created by Natsuko to stop Memmeln from transforming into the Ultimate Void and put an end to her ulterior motives. Memmeln idolizes him.
Meg and Sally
Two elves who aid Memmeln with her plans to unleash the Ultimate Void and end their immortality. Like Memmeln, they may have abandoned their plans as a result of Sir Exister influencing them.
Midori Ichihashi
A girl who fell in love with Natsuko, but their relationship ended when she moved away.
Shu Ninomiya
A boy who fell in love with Natsuko during middle school, but could not win her over.
Saburo Aoi
A director who serves as a rival to Natsuko, but also had feelings for her. Like Midori and Shu, he also failed to win her heart.
Naomi Fukushima
The president of the studio that Natsuko works at.
Kametaro Tsuruyama
The director of A Tale of Perishing, who died by food poisoning but is reincarnated into the alternate world as a bird. She chastizes Natsuko for trying to change her "masterpiece", often stating "It's no use". She tells Natsuko that the plot is inevitable and set in stone. At the end she remarks "A happy ending does not a good story make" after Natsuko successfully changes Luke's fate. Natsuko idolizes her, but she is often annoyed with her.

== Episodes ==
No.	Title	Directed by (Note: Production staff information is taken from the ending credits of each episode.)	Storyboarded by	Chief animation director	Original release date
1	"First Stroke"; Transliteration: "Shisen." (Japanese: 始線。)	Sumie Noro	Mitsue Yamazaki	Kayoko Ishikawa	January 5, 2025
Natsuko Hirose, a 22 year old animator who quickly gained fame and notoriety, is working on her next masterpiece when she suffers a bad case of food poisoning and dies. When she awakens, she is in the world of her favorite anime from childhood, A Tale of Perishing. She meets the main cast—Luke Braveheart, Memmeln, Unio, and QJ—after they save her from being eaten by a Void monster, though they think she is a gremlin due to her hair in her face. Natsuko is forced to find her own way to the Last Town, where she tries to convince the heroes of an impending attack, which they ignore. When her predictions come true, however, she uses her new power to draw a creature strong enough to defeat them and prevent the scripted death of Unio, making the heroes see that she's really a human. Due to a misunderstanding, the heroes believe Natsuko is from a kingdom named "Reality" and that she is an "aneemator".
2	"Defend"; Transliteration: "Shishu." (Japanese: 死守。)	Ai Kondō	Risako Yoshida	Shuji Takahara	January 12, 2025
More of A Tale of Perishing's world building is revealed from Natsuko's childhood memories. She awakens three days after saving the Last Town and learns she cannot use her new power at will. After Luke makes her breakfast, she and the heroes are summoned by the Mayor, wherein she is asked to join the Nine Soldiers and help prevent the end of the world. After some thinking, she decides to join the Nine Soldiers in the hopes she'll find a way back home. She then helps the Nine defeat another scripted event and becomes an official member—then passes out for another three days, since what she drew would normally take her three days of work.
3	"Destiny"; Transliteration: "Unmei." (Japanese: 運命。)	Yasufumi Soejima	Yasufumi Soejima	Kayoko Ishikawa & Etsuko Sumimoto	January 19, 2025
Natsuko becomes a celebrated hero with the Nine Soldiers and attends the Harvest Festival, dressed up by Memmeln. Another character, Luke's brief love interest Destiny, makes her debut and enchants Luke as she hides from her betrothed. Her goal is to open an orphanage, thus she intends to marry the richest man in town and use his money to open one. Natsuko convinces her to open one by herself without his help, and the festival is infiltrated by a Void disguised as the Priest. Natsuko creates a masked wrestler to fight the mantis Void, who inspires Destiny. Three days later, after she has awoken, Destiny arrives donning similar attire to the masked wrestler, having decided to be just like him. She had also canceled her engagement and intends to start an orphanage on her own. Natsuko is suspicious of Memmeln due to her absence during the attack.
4	"Eternity"; Transliteration: "Eien." (Japanese: 永遠。)	Iho Ishikawa	Mitsue Yamazaki	Kayoko Ishikawa & Kazuko Hayakawa	January 26, 2025
Knowing how the events of the story play out, Natsuko suspects Memmeln is behind it, but doesn't know why and tails her to find out. Luke follows Natsuko, when they arrive at a cemetery where Memmeln's choir supposedly practices. They instead uncover a cult that Memmeln leads, whose goal is to summon the Ultimate Void and destroy the world because she is tired of her long lifespan as an elf. Natsuko wants to prevent Luke from having to kill Memmeln like he did in canon, and she and Luke try to talk her out of it. Eventually, Memmeln changes her mind at the last minute during the summoning ritual upon Natsuko creating a handsome character named Sir Exister after finding something she can "fangirl over" for eternity.
5	"Justice"; Transliteration: "Seigi." (Japanese: 正義。)	Shinji Imada	Shinji Imada	Kayoko Ishikawa, Yuka Kudou & Chen Weining	February 2, 2025
Time passes, and Natsuko continues to fight hordes of Void creatures with the Nine Soldiers, dominating in the destruction department. Destiny ropes the Nine into herding orphaned children from the slums to her newly-built orphanage, during which Natsuko is shown to be very good with entertaining children. They run into an ex-member of the nine, a dragon named Justice, who has become a drunken womanizer. Natsuko attempts to convince Justice to tell Luke about the injury he suffered in their last battle together, but Justice refuses because Luke would blame himself for it. Slime-like Voids attack the city and a mysterious talking bird informs Natsuko that her drawings won't work this time, which ends up being true.
6	"Change"; Transliteration: "Henka." (Japanese: 変化。)	Kiyoshi Matsuda & Yasutomo Okamoto	Teruyuki Omine & Hiroshi Kobayashi	Kayoko Ishikawa & Etsuko Sumimoto	February 9, 2025
The slime Voids invade the city and make a cocoon around the tower to the Soul Future, and Natsuko is still convinced that she has to solve the problem herself, which Luke scolds her for. Luke and Justice talk about how victory isn't always possible, but Luke is determined. QJ and Memmeln try and convince Natsuko that it's okay to accept help from others, and together they form a plan to liberate the town. The mystery bird appears to discourage Natsuko again, and a centipede Void emerges from the cocoon, consuming QJ and Memmeln (who are later freed). A desperate struggle to defeat the Void ensues, and Luke defeats it with his friends' help. Afterwards, Luke and Justice have a heart-to-heart.
7	"First Love"; Transliteration: "Hatsukoi." (Japanese: 初恋。)	Tokio Igarashi	Tokio Igarashi	Kayoko Ishikawa & Kazuko Hayakawa	February 16, 2025
Natsuko's past with friends is revealed. Many of them fell in love with her in one way or another, but were either too intimidated or too insecure to confess to her. This is shown to happen over and over again, culminating in her manager, Naomi, discovering Natsuko as a new money-making genius. She convinces Natsuko to work on a romantic comedy, but lacking any experience with the subject, she struggles to create scenes. During this time, she dies of food poisoning. In the present, the Nine Soldiers, including Justice, feast at the orphanage. Natsuko enjoys herself when the mystery bird shows up once again.
8	"Confession"; Transliteration: "Kokuhaku." (Japanese: 告白。)	Im Ka Hee	Im Ka Hee	Kayoko Ishikawa & Chen Weining	February 23, 2025
The bird turns out to be Kametaro Tsuruyama, the creator of A Tale of Perishing. She is very annoyed with all the changes that Natsuko made to the storyline and informs Natsuko that the ending to the story is set in stone and she can't change it. She then further tells Natsuko to return to reality, though she doesn't know how. Luke asks for advice about his romantic feelings for Natsuko and confesses, though it just confuses her. Justice wingmans for him, and Luke takes Natsuko on a date to a hot spring. A Void attacks while they're there and is eventually defeated, at which point Natsuko realizes she's in love with Luke.
9	"Hero"; Transliteration: "Yūsha." (Japanese: 勇者。)	Sumie Noro	Kiyoshi Yasuda, Risako Yoshida & Tokio Igarashi	Kayoko Ishikawa & Etsuko Sumimoto	March 2, 2025
Luke recalls losing his friends and fellow Nine Soldiers to Voids and how he was saved by Natsuko's appearance when he was reaching his breaking point. He carries her back from the hot springs, but when she wakes, she's too nervous to speak to him. QJ questions her on what Kametaro meant when she spoke of Luke's fate, and Natsuko reveals all the events that were supposed to happen. More Voids attack, but they are copies of the summons Natsuko's already created, making her hesitant to draw anything else lest she give the enemy more ideas. QJ sacrifices himself and entrusts the future to her.
10	"Chaos"; Transliteration: "Konran." (Japanese: 混乱。)	Mitsue Yamazaki, Youhei Tsuchiya, Kazuo Miyake & Yasuhiro Geshi	Shinji Imada	Kayoko Ishikawa, Manabu Akita & Chen Weining	March 10, 2025 (Note: This episode aired at 12:15 a.m. JST, 30 minutes after the original air time on TV Tokyo.)
A funeral is held for QJ while the town is in disarray, and the people turn on Natsuko, believing that she was secretly helping the Voids all along. Luke removes her from the team for her own safety, as well as everyone else's, though Justice maintains that she's the only one who can help them. Destiny and Memmeln partially revert to their original character arcs, and Luke and Unio flee the citizens who are hunting Natsuko, with Luke desperate to find and protect her. Scribble Voids appear, mimicking her discarded drawings, and attack. Natsuko is wounded by some townspeople and Luke steps in to protect her, when she and Unio are both eaten by a Void after she saves a child. It is destroyed by the townsfolk, leaving only Natsuko's pegboard behind and Luke on the verge of a mental breakdown.
11	"Despair"; Transliteration: "Zetsubō." (Japanese: 絶望。)	Jun Shishido	Jun Shishido	Kayoko Ishikawa, Kazuko Hayakawa, Shuji Takahara, Etsuko Sumimoto & Zhang Yun	March 17, 2025
The Scribble Voids continue to decimate the town, killing and destroying everything in their path, and Luke succumbs to his despair when Natsuko's pegboard disappears. Still trapped in the Void's stomach, Natsuko is tormented by nightmares, but Unio eventually finds her and gives her the encouragement she needs: Luke needs her right now. She remembers her past and obsession with Luke in childhood, and a younger version of herself grants her a new pegboard. Justice and Memmeln attempt to rebuild QJ, but Luke destroys the Soul Future himself in his despair and invokes the Ultimate Void.
12	"Zenshu."; Transliteration: "Zenshu." (Japanese: 全修。)	Mitsue Yamazaki, Sumie Noro, Iho Ishikawa & Tokio Igarashi	Mitsue Yamazaki & Hiroshi Kobayashi	Kayoko Ishikawa, Manabu Akita, Zhang Yun, Chen Weining, Etsuko Sumimoto & Shuji Takahara	March 23, 2025
Memmeln's friends are crushed after rebuilding QJ, but she notices a light coming from one of the Voids, which she opens and releases Natsuko and Unio. Luke transforms into the Ultimate Void, unleashing torrents of attacks to destroy the town. Memmeln and the others try and tell Luke that Natsuko is alive, but he's too far gone. Natsuko draws many copies of Luke to fight the Void he's become while QJ encourages her, even as they are both mortally wounded by his attacks. Natsuko creates one final Luke that manages to slay him as she confesses her love for him aloud. Everyone is reborn into a new world with all nine Soul Futures intact. Kametaro isn't happy with this ending, and Natsuko collapses and begins to disappear as she and Luke profess their love; Luke promises he'll find her wherever she goes. In the real world, Natsuko turns over a new leaf and is surprised to run into familiar faces.

== Reception ==
The show's entry in The Encyclopedia of Science Fiction called it "a fond look at the Anime industry and the Clichés of the fantasy anime of past decades," with elements of satire, tackling darker and serious themes such as feminism. The entry concludes that "though the ending is tied up a little too quickly, Zenshu was a good series".

=== Accolades ===
Year	Award	Category	Recipient	Result	Ref.
2026	12th Anime Trending Awards	Best in Original Screenplay	Kimiko Ueno	Won	
2026	12th Anime Trending Awards	Opening Theme Song of the Year	"Zen" by Band-Maid	Nominated	
2026	12th Anime Trending Awards	Ending Theme Song of the Year	"Tada, Kimi no Mama de" by Sou	Nominated	
2026	12th Anime Trending Awards	Fantasy Anime of the Year	Zenshu	Nominated	
2026	12th Anime Trending Awards	Romance Anime of the Year	Zenshu	Nominated	
2026	10th Crunchyroll Anime Awards	Best Original Anime	Zenshu	Nominated	
2026	10th Crunchyroll Anime Awards	Best Isekai Anime	Zenshu	Nominated	
