= Tada Never Falls in Love =

Japanese anime series

- Tada Never Falls in Love key visual

多田くんは恋をしない (Tada-kun wa Koi o Shinai)
- Genre: Romantic comedy
- Created by: Hanayami Yoshitaka
- Anime television series
- Directed by: Mitsue Yamazaki
- Produced by: Mitsuhiro Ogata; Shō Tanaka; Tomoyuki Ōwada; Aya Iizuka; Hidehisa Nagasawa; Hajime Kamata; Kaori Kimura; Yūji Satō
- Written by: Yoshiko Nakamura
- Music by: Yukari Hashimoto
- Studio: Doga Kobo
- Licensed by: NA: Sentai Filmworks; SEA: Muse Communication
- Original network: AT-X, Tokyo MX, TVA, KBS, SUN, TVQ, BS11
- English network: SEA: Animax Asia
- Original run: April 5, 2018 – June 28, 2018
- Episodes: 13
- Light novel

Tada-kun wa Koi o Shinai Teresa Wāgunā no Jijō
- Written by: Nakamura Tadako
- Published by: Kadokawa
- Published: June 1, 2018
- icon

Tada Never Falls in Love (Japanese: 多田くんは恋をしない, Hepburn: Tada-kun wa Koi o Shinai) is a Japanese romantic comedy original anime television series produced by Doga Kobo. It aired from April 5 to June 28, 2018, for 13 episodes. The series is licensed in North America by Sentai Filmworks while Muse Communication in South and Southeast Asia as well as Hong Kong and Taiwan.

== Plot ==
The story follows Mitsuyoshi Tada, a boy who has never known love. He is taking pictures of the cherry blossoms in full bloom when he meets Teresa Wagner, a transfer student from Larsenburg (ラルセンブルク, Rarusenburuku) which can be assumed means Luxembourg, a European country. She got separated from her travel companion upon arriving in Japan. Tada helps her and brings her to his grandfather's coffee shop. Teresa's travel companion and bodyguard Alec arrives and beats up Kaoru mistakenly thinking Kaoru was flirting with Teresa. They discover the hotel they're supposed to be staying at is actually next to Tada's cafe. The next day, they enroll in Tada's school and are in the same class. Alec agrees on joining the Photography Club on Teresa's request she wants to learn to take great pictures. Mitsuyoshi is actually an aspiring photographer and wants to follow his father's footsteps to be a famous photographer. Mitsuyoshi lost his parents in a car accident during his childhood. The one last photo his father took and his camera were the only things he has left from his parents. The story focuses on the adventures of Tada and his friends and their building relationships.

== Characters ==
Mitsuyoshi Tada (多田 光良, Tada Mitsuyoshi)
Voiced by: Yūichi Nakamura (Japanese); Jessie James Grelle (English)
The main character, Mitsuyoshi is a second-year student at Koinosei High School attached to Ginga University. He is good at photography and belongs to the photography department. His parents died in a car accident ten years ago. Mitsuyoshi and his sister Yui live with their grandfather, helping him at Tada Coffee Shop. He aims to become a famous photographer like his father. Mitsuyoshi is loved by others due to her quiet, yet sincere and attentive personality.
Teresa Wagner (テレサ・ワーグナー, Teresa Wāgunā) / Teresa de Luxemburg (テレサ・ドゥ・ラルセンブルク, Teresa do Rarusenburuku)
Voiced by: Manaka Iwami (Japanese); Sarah Wiedenheft (English)
The Princess of Luxembourg and the heir to the Queen's throne, Teresa came overseas to Japan as an exchange student and has an encounter with Mitsuyoshi while traveling and ends up in his school. Energetic and an airhead with a heartwarming smile, she is an avid fan of the fictional TV series Rainbow Shogun. Teresa lives in Grand Palace Ginza, a hotel next to Mitsuyoshi's Cafe with her bodyguard Alec. In Japan, no one knows about her being the heir. During her introduction to the Tada family, she slipped a syllable uttering her name as "Teresa du-" before correcting herself and saying "Teresa Wagner". As a member of the royal family, Tereza is realistic in her expectations and does not show any arrogance.
Alexandra Magritte (アレクサンドラ・マグリット, Arekusandora Maguritto)
Voiced by: Shino Shimoji (Japanese); Avery Smithhart (English)
Nicknamed "Alec", Alexandra is Teresa's caretaker, assistant, and bodyguard who also attends school along with Teresa and has been with her since childhood. She is over-protective of Teresa regarding the activities she does and the people she interacts with. However, Alec has a weakness when Teresa asks her for something. She is constantly on guard with Kaoru for his flirtatious ways of interacting with her.
Kaoru Ijūin (伊集院 薫, Ijūin Kaoru)
Voiced by: Mamoru Miyano (Japanese); Mike Haimoto (English)
Kaoru is Mitsuyoshi's close friend, classmate, and fellow Photography Club member. He is popular amongst girls and a narcissist who cannot resist the urge of photographing himself and showing off with them. Kaoru has a fear of Alec after she beats him up believing he was chasing after Teresa. His family owns an old Japanese-style restaurant, which has allowed him to hone his cooking skill where he is able to cook an entire feast for his friends.
Hajime Sugimoto (杉本 一, Sugimoto Hajime)
Voiced by: Yūichirō Umehara, Tomokazu Sugita (Note: Due to Yūichirō Umehara's illness, Tomokazu Sugita voices the character from Episodes 11 to 12.) (Japanese); Scott Gibbs (English)
Hajime is President of the Photography Club who likes girls and to photograph them in a nude way beyond anything else. He seems to be close with Hinako and bicker frequently. Hajime admires gravure idol Hina and has a vast collection of her merchandise, but is unaware she is actually Hinako. He is shown to be a pervert and called Pin-senpai by the club members.
Hinako Hasegawa (長谷川 日向子, Hasegawa Hinako)
Voiced by: Shizuka Ishigami (Japanese); Shanae'a Moore (English)
Hinako is Class President of Mitsuyoshi's class. She is also a member of the Photography Club, but mostly a stand-in one as the club is still open. Hinako seems close to Hajime as she addresses him casually although they argue frequently. She is a diligent girl but secretly the gravure idol Hina, whom Hajime admires, a fact he is oblivious to. Her identity as Hina is known only to Alec and Teresa, while Charles also seems to be suspiciously thinking the same as well.
Kentarō Yamashita (山下 研太郎, Yamashita Kentarō)
Voiced by: Hiro Shimono (Japanese); Howard Wang (English)
Kentarō is a first year student at Koinosei High School. He is nicknamed "Yamashita Dog" because he always responds to Mitsuyoshi's finger-whistling and behaves like one. Kentarō likes the owner of the neighborhood's beauty salon, but she only sees him as a little brother.
Yui Tada (多田 ゆい, Tada Yui)
Voiced by: Inori Minase (Japanese); Savanna Menzel (English)
Yui is Mitsuyoshi's younger sister who lives at their family's cafe. She has a crush on Yamashita.
Charles de Loire (シャルル・ド・ロワール, Sharuru do Rowāru)
Voiced by: Takahiro Sakurai (Japanese); Ian Sinclair (English)
Charles is a descendant of French nobility who has been in contact with Teresa since they were children. In Episode 6, he is revealed to be Teresa's fiancé, a fact unknown to everyone except Teresa, Alec and Charles himself. Charles is introduced to the Photography Club members as Teresa's childhood friend and gets in good terms with everyone by hitting right at their sweet spots. He is destined to become Grand Duke of Luxemburg by marrying Teresa. At present time, he is a university student and also manages certain companies. During a discussion with Mitsuyoshi and Kaoru, Charles admits to have fallen in love once while gazing at Teresa.
KittyBig (ニャンコビッグ, Nyankobiggu)
Voiced by: Ari Ozawa/Akio Otsuka (voice in his heart) (Japanese); Kyle Jones/Jovan Jackson (voice in his heart) (English)
KittyBig is a stray cat Mitsuyoshi found and adopted who detests Kaoru. He is proud of Mitsuyoshi as he has looked over him growing up and striving towards his dream to be a photographer. KittyBig has his own blog where Mitsuyoshi posts photos and writes about his daily encounters with Kaoru.

== Production and development ==
The 13-episode original anime television series by Doga Kobo aired from April 5 to June 28, 2018. The series is directed by Mitsue Yamazaki, with series composition by Yoshiko Nakamura, character designs by Junichiro Taniguchi and music by Yukari Hashimoto. The opening theme is "Otomodachi Film" (オトモダチフィルム, Otomodachi Firumu) performed by Masayoshi Ōishi, and the ending theme is a cover of the Sambomaster song "Love Song" (ラブソング, Rabu Songu) performed by Manaka Iwami as her character Teresa Wagner. Sentai Filmworks has licensed the series and streamed it on Hidive outside of Asia while Muse Communication licensed it in South and Southeast Asia as well as Taiwan and Hong Kong.

== Episodes ==
No.	Title (Note: All English titles are taken from Hidive.)	Directed by (Note: Information is taken from the ending credits of each episode.)	Written by	Storyboarded by	Original release date
1	"I Can't Just Leave You"; Transliteration: "Hottokenai Darō" (Japanese: ほっとけないだろ)	Mitsue Yamazaki	Yoshiko Nakamura	Mitsue Yamazaki	April 5, 2018
Mitsuyoshi Tada, a boy who comes to take a picture of the cherry blossoms in full bloom with a camera in his hand, meets a foreign girl, Teresa Wagner. Teresa, who had studied abroad from a country called Luxembourg in Europe, is lost as soon as she arrived in Japan and is separated from her companion who comes with her. Mitsuyoshi, who helps Teresa because of her circumstances, takes her to the Tada's coffee shop in Ginza, Tokyo, where his grandfather runs.
2	"Well, She's Not Wrong"; Transliteration: "Mā, Machigatchainai" (Japanese: まあ、間違っちゃいない)	Satoshi Toba	Yoshiko Nakamura	Sumie Noro	April 12, 2018
Teresa and her companion, Alexandra Magritte (commonly known as Alec), come to Koinoboshi High School attached to the Galactic University, where Mitsuyoshi and her childhood friend, Kaoru Ijūin, attend. Since there is a school rule that students of Koinoboshi High School must belong to club activities, the two of them visited various clubs with Hinako Hasegawa, the chairman of the same class, and Mitsuyoshi. Come to the photography club to which they belong. In the photography club room, the president, Hajime Sugimoto, is screaming.
3	"You Love That"; Transliteration: "Sore, Suki da nā" (Japanese: それ、好きだなあ)	Fujiwara Yoshiyuki	Yoshiko Nakamura	Kiyotaka Suzuki	April 19, 2018
The mascot of the Tada coffee shop is a domestic cat of the Tada family. Nyanko Big, a popular cat who is also active in blogs as a horrifying Nyanko Big. When he was a kitten, Mitsuyoshi picked him up while he was singing in the garden. For him, Mitsuyoshi is a lifesaver and should be watched over by Mitsuyoshi's late parents. As usual today, Nyanko Big begins to act to wake up Mitsuyoshi who is still sleeping.
4	"I'll Pretend I Didn't See This..."; Transliteration: "Mina Katta Koto ni Shiyō......" (Japanese: 見なかったことにしよう......)	Mitsue Yamazaki, Fujiwara Yoshiyuki, Takafumi Fujī	Yoshiko Nakamura	Fujiwara Yoshiyuki, Kim Seong-hyun	April 26, 2018
Hajime Sugimoto, the president of the photography club, commonly known as Pin-senpai, is in a frenzy. This is because he wins the lottery for the first photobook handing over by HINA, a gravure idol he loves. HINA has never appeared in public until now. He has a valuable chance to meet her in person, but when he imagines he will meet her, Pin-senpai is nervous and trembles and couldn't speak anything. Mitsuyoshi proposes to practice meeting for the time being.
5	"It's Okay. They Don't Exist"; Transliteration: "Daijōbu da. Inai kara" (Japanese: 大丈夫だ。いないから)	Daisuke Hiramaki	Yoshiko Nakamura	Daisuke Hiramaki	May 3, 2018
The day of the memorable "10th Kaoru Ijūin Show" has arrived. The "Kaoru Ijūin Show" is like a fun party where Kaoru organizes various events every year and welcomes Mitsuyoshi and Yui at the Tada coffee shop. Since he joins the photography club, Hajime and Hinako have also participated. With the addition of Teresa, Alec and Kentarō Yamashita this year, Kaoru, who was even more enthusiastic, has prepared a special project.
6	"I'm Not a Rain-bringer"; Transliteration: "Ame Otoko, ja nai zo" (Japanese: 雨男、じゃないぞ)	Sumie Noro	Yoshiko Nakamura	Sumie Noro	May 10, 2018
Taking advantage of the university's summer vacation, Teresa's childhood friend, Charles de Loire, comes to Japan. Charles also visits Koinoboshi High School, saying that he wants to see Teresa in Japan. The members of the photography club are nervous at first, but Charles is such a nice person that he can quickly get to know him. The next day, Mitsuyoshi happens to see him at a party invited by Kaoru. Next to that, there are beautifully dressed up Teresa and Alec.
7	"It's Better Than Crying"; Transliteration: "Nakareru yori wa Īdarō" (Japanese: 泣かれるよりはいいだろ)	Sumie Noro, Satoshi Toba, Yoshiyuki Fujiwara, Takeshita Ryohira	Yoshiko Nakamura	Akitoshi Shimadzu	May 17, 2018
One day, Nyanko Big disappears while going out. Mitsuyoshi wonders if something hard has happened because Nyanko Big has not touched the food he will not normally leave behind, and Mitsuyoshi cannot find him that he has been using since he is a kitten. Yui is in a hurry. While encouraging Yui to worry that it is okay because it is Nyanko Big, Mitsuyoshi and his friends go looking for Nyanko Big.
8	"Did You Say You Were a Rain-bringer?"; Transliteration: "Ame Onna dattakke?" (Japanese: 雨女だったっけ？)	Yoshiyuki Fujiwara	Yoshiko Nakamura	Yoshiyuki Fujiwara	May 24, 2018
All the members of the photography club come to the overnight training camp in the car driven by Charles to take pictures of the stars who applies for the competition. But unfortunately, the sky is a little cloudy. The pictures of the stars are taken from midnight to dawn, so Mitsuyoshi prays to the shrine that the clouds will clear up by then. Mitsuyoshi and his friends, who draw fortunes there, are excited about the story of love, while being overwhelmed by the written fortune.
9	"I Don't Have One Now..."; Transliteration: "Ima wa, Mō, nai......" (Japanese: 今は、もう、ない......)	Tomoaki Koshida	Yoshiko Nakamura	Machio Fukuda	May 31, 2018
Teresa sees off Charles returning home with Alec at the airport. She cannot continue her words there because she is once again asked by Alec for her readiness. That night, Teresa remembers her words from her nanny, Rachel, when she decided to study abroad in Japan. She is now worried that she does not even think of it at that time. But she decides to act as if she has not done anything and she will work hard in the new semester beginning the next day.
10	"It Isn't the Real One"; Transliteration: "Honmono, ja nai yo na" (Japanese: 本物、じゃないよな)	Machio Fukuda	Yoshiko Nakamura	Akitoshi Shimadzu	June 7, 2018
Under the Tokyo Skytree, Mitsuyoshi and Teresa come to the event "Reinbo Shogun Exhibition" to commemorate the 40th anniversary of Reinbo Shogun. They play at various attractions of the exhibition and have a fun time. When they climb the Tokyo Skytree, it gets cloudy and starts to rain. Watching the rain, Mitsuyoshi suddenly begins telling Teresa about the day his parents had the car accident.
11	"Not Really"; Transliteration: "Toku ni wa Nani mo" (Japanese: 特には何も)	Yoshiyuki Fujiwara	Yoshiko Nakamura	Mitsue Yamazaki	June 14, 2018
Teresa and Alec suddenly return to Luxembourg without telling Mitsuyoshi and others. Ijūin rings the door bell of the room of Grand Palace Ginza where they lived, but there is no response and they cannot even call her phone number. Mitsuyoshi and his friends are depressed because they do not know what had happened and cannot get in touch. Afterwards, they heard nothing of Teresa and Alec until winter.
12	"Sorry for Surprising You..."; Transliteration: "......Totsuzen, Gomen" (Japanese: ......突然、ごめん)	Sumie Noro	Yoshiko Nakamura	Sumie Noro	June 21, 2018
Mitsuyoshi visits Luxembourg after boarding an airplane with the determination of death. He rests his exhausted body and goes to the address given by his grandfather. Just before Christmas, the city is well-decorated. Mitsuyoshi walks through the Christmas market and reaches the address, a huge palace. However, the gate is tightly guarded by unresponsive guards, so Tada doesn't know where to enter. He is wandering around without giving up and is called out from behind by Rachel, Teresa's nanny.
13	"I'll Never Forget It, Either"; Transliteration: "Ore mo, Isshō, Wasurenai" (Japanese: 俺も、一生、忘れない)	Mitsue Yamazaki	Yoshiko Nakamura	Mitsue Yamazaki, Akitoshi Shimadzu	June 28, 2018
Mitsuyoshi is overwhelmed by the truth revealed by Teresa. He cannot even say what he wants to say when he is told that everything has been decided since she was born. Kaoru rushes to see if that's okay, but Mitsuyoshi tells him he does nt know what to say. And he says it is just annoying to tell. Kaoru hits Mitsuyoshi with the thoughts he has hidden in his heart.

== Other media ==
A novel adaptation titled Tada-kun wa Koi o Shinai: Teresa Wagner no Jijō (多田くんは恋をしない テレサ・ワーグナーの事情, Tada-kun wa Koi o Shinai Teresa Wāgunā no Jijō; lit. 'Tada Never Falls in Love: Teresa Wagner's Circumstances') was published by Kadokawa under its Kadokawa Beans Bunko imprint on June 1, 2018, Tadako Nakamura as its author, Junichiro Taniguchi as the cover illustrator and Eri Kagami as the text illustrator.

No.	Original release date	Original ISBN	English release date	English ISBN
1	June 1, 2018	9784041070246		

== Reception ==
The first three episodes of the anime received generally positive reviews by various critics.

Rose Bridges from Anime News Network wrote the anime "grabbed her" from its first moments stating that "It was a show you could really root for". She praise the first episodes by tackling how tourist interact with their "idolized place" versus how locals see them. Her review of the second episode in the other hand is quite mixed noting that the episode introduces a bunch of new characters "who are all fairly unmemorable anime archetypes". She called the third episode "show's best episode yet" saying that it "turned things around" after the last episode, noting that "Nyako Big" is the "best character" in the show and "Not everyone's going to be as much of a cat lover coming into this show, but it's admirable to see Tada Never Falls in Love take risks like this. That attitude could be key to the show's success as a memorable comedy." She ended Tada Never Falls in Love is "always has a bright and peppy feel" and "always a visual marvel" but noting that "The character and gag writing needs to catch up."

Dee from Anime Feminist wrote that anime is a "puzzle" saying that the "charming comedic and character beats periodically interrupted by broad slapstick and tropey anime cliches". She heavily criticize the second episode pointing out that it features "obnoxiously horny teen dudes who kept interrupting the nice club antics to shout about nude ladies and check out the girls’ chests." She commented that the third episode "won her back" stating that it is a "start-to-finish delight".
