= Mitsue Yamazaki =

Japanese anime director

- 山崎 光恵
- Occupation: Anime director
- Notable work: Hakkenden: Eight Dogs of the East; Monthly Girls' Nozaki-kun; How Heavy Are the Dumbbells You Lift?; Sleepy Princess in the Demon Castle; Zenshu; Though I Am an Inept Villainess

Mitsue Yamazaki (山崎 光恵, Yamazaki Mitsue) is a Japanese anime director. After joining the anime industry, she worked as a production assistant and episode director. She co-created and directed the 2025 television series Zenshu. She has also directed series such as Hakkenden: Eight Dogs of the East (2012), Monthly Girls' Nozaki-kun (2014), Magic-kyun! Renaissance (2016), Tada Never Falls in Love (2018), How Heavy Are the Dumbbells You Lift? (2019), Sleepy Princess in the Demon Castle (2020), and Though I Am an Inept Villainess (2026–present).

== Life and career ==
Mitsue Yamazaki became interested in working in the anime industry after seeing Cowboy Bebop and Urusei Yatsura 2: Beautiful Dreamer while job hunting. She joined Madhouse, Inc. as a production manager after passing a test on in-between animation. She later moved to Nomad, where "they let [her] do a bit of everything" due to the company's small size, but seriously considered quitting the industry due to the excessive effort involved.

Yamazaki originally worked as an episode director for several anime series, including Bleach, Durarara!!, Itazura na Kiss, Penguindrum, and Rozen Maiden. She then became the series director for Hakkenden: Eight Dogs of the East (2012), Monthly Girls' Nozaki-kun (2014), and Magic-kyun! Renaissance (2016). In 2018, she joined several Monthly Girls' Nozaki-kun staff members to work on Tada Never Falls in Love, where she was series director; Disgaeamad of SakugaBlog admitted that Yamazaki "might be the most interesting director" to work for Doga Kobo. She later continued working as a series director afterwards, namely for How Heavy Are the Dumbbells You Lift? (2019) and Sleepy Princess in the Demon Castle (2020).

Yamazaki co-created the 2025 MAPPA anime television series Zenshu, serving concurrently as series director. She named the series after zenshu (全修), a Japanese word which means "full retake", due to its nature as a term that "makes people in the industry shudder". She is director for the 2026 Though I Am an Inept Villainess anime.

== Artistry ==
Steve Jones of Anime News Network called Yamazaki "a talented director", remarking that she had accumulated a vast experience in the industry, including under fellow director Kunihiko Ikuhara, and concluding: "Obviously, she can wrangle together a show that looks and feels great under the correct conditions." Writing for Anime Feminist, Tony Sun Prickett described her as "one of the most consistently brilliant female directors working in the industry".

== Filmography ==
Year	Title	Credits	Ref.
2013	Hakkenden: Eight Dogs of the East	Series director	
2014	Monthly Girls' Nozaki-kun	Series director	
2016	Magic-kyun! Renaissance	Series director	
2018	Tada Never Falls in Love	Series director	
2019	How Heavy Are the Dumbbells You Lift?	Series director, sound director	
2020	Sleepy Princess in the Demon Castle	Series director	
2025	Zenshu	Series director, creator	
2026	Though I Am an Inept Villainess	Series director	
