= Farahnaz Nikray =

Japanese voice actress

- ニケライ ファラナーゼ
- Born: Farahnaz Nikray; 14 January 1994 (age 32); Tokyo, Japan
- Occupation: Voice actress
- Years active: 2017–present
- Agent: Atomic Monkey
- Notable credits: Though I Am an Inept Villainess as Kō Tōsetsu; One Piece as Ripley

Farahnaz Nikray (Japanese: ニケライ ファラナーゼ, Hepburn: Nikerai Faranāze; born 14 January 1994) is a Japanese voice actress from Tokyo who is affiliated with Atomic Monkey.

== Biography ==
Farahnaz Nikray was born 14 January 1994 in Tokyo to Iranian parents who immigrated to Japan during the Iran–Iraq War.

She graduated from the voice actor training school School Duo. After graduating, she was signed to talent agency Ken Production, but became a freelancer in 2020.

In 2022, she obtained Japanese citizenship by naturalization.

On 1 February 2024, she became affiliated with Atomic Monkey.

== Personal life ==
She has passed level 3 of the Japan Kanji Aptitude Test. She can also speak Persian.

== Filmography ==
=== TV anime ===
2017

- Heybot! (Sofbit)

2018

- Megalobox (2018–2021, Count, Basketball Boy A, Marla)
- Layton Mystery Tanteisha: Katori no Nazotoki File (Kelly)
- Hug! PreCure
- Muhyo & Roji's Bureau of Supernatural Investigation (Lily Elena)
- Double Decker! Doug & Kirill (Nurse B)

2019

- Dororo (Female Farmer A)
- Inazuma Eleven: Orion no Kokuin (Young Daninho)
- To the Abandoned Sacred Beasts (Aunt)

2020

- Keep Your Hands Off Eizouken! (Lunch Lady, Student)
- Earwig and the Witch

2021

- Kingdom (You Tribe Member C)

2023

- Bofuri ("Kingdom of the Flame Emperor" Member, "Fluffy Friends Room" Cats, Nine-Tailed Fox, Zombie, Ignis)
- Dead Mount Death Play (Deathclaw Saya)
- Edens Zero (Employee, Russo)

2024

- Tsukimichi: Moonlit Fantasy (Estelle)
- Fairy Tail: 100 Years Quest (Mimi)

2025

- The 100 Girlfriends Who Really, Really, Really, Really, Really Love You (Saurko Terano)
- A Wild Last Boss Appeared! (Deputy Leader)

2026

- The Darwin Incident (Lydia Eldred)
- Gnosia
- Rooster Fighter (Boy A)
- One Piece (Ripley)
- Though I Am an Inept Villainess (Kō Tōsetsu)
- Jaadugar: A Witch in Mongolia (Zumurrud)

=== Animated films ===
- Pretty Cure All Stars: Singing with Everyone Miraculous Magic! (2016)
- Lupin the IIIrd: Fujiko Mine's Lie (2019, Security guard A)
- Mobile Suit Gundam: Hathaway (2021–2026, Max Harriet, Wave)

=== Original net animations ===
- Devilman Crybaby (2018, Tourist B)
- Japan Sinks: 2020 (2020, Refugee M)

=== Video games ===
2017

- The Legend of Zelda: Breath of the Wild
- Assassin's Creed Origins
- Star Wars Battlefront II

2018

- The Midnight Sanctuary

2020

- Monster Hunter Riders (Leones)

2021

- Balan Wonderworld (Sana Hudson)

2022

- Mario + Rabbids Sparks of Hope (Daphne)

2023

- Hogwarts Legacy (Mudiwa Onai)
- Star Wars Jedi: Survivor (Ashe Javi)
- The Legend of Zelda: Tears of the Kingdom

2024

- Granblue Fantasy: Relink
- Final Fantasy VII Rebirth

2025

- Path to Nowhere (Pine)
- Monster Hunter Wilds (Hunter Type2)
- The Great Villainess: Strategy of Lily (Geena Pepper, Jane Snowflake)

2026

- Quiz RPG: The World of Mystic Wiz (Shitodo Riran)

=== Dubbing roles ===
==== Live action ====
- The Cider House Rules (Olive Worthington (Kate Nelligan)) (Note: Netflix version)
- The Bronze (Janis (Cecily Strong))
- Hands of Stone (Stephanie Arcel (Ellen Barkin), Frankie Chavo (John Turturro))
- Catfight (Rachel (Ivana Miličević), Carl’s wife)
- The Worthy (Raya (Ruba Blal), Zainab)
- Justice League (Commanding Amazon)
- Star Wars: The Rise of Skywalker
- Ocean's 8 (Cynthia)
- A Star Is Born (Gail (Rebecca Field))
- Green Book (Bartender)
- The Last Movie Star (Faith Cole (Nikki Blonsky))
- Harriet (film) (Araminta "Minty" Ross / Harriet Tubman (Cynthia Erivo))
- The One and Only Ivan (Henrietta)
- Slaughterhouse Rulez (Dorm Mother (Jane Stanes))
- Remember Me (Diane Hirsch (Lena Olin))
- Zack Snyder's Justice League (Mother)
- Sisters in Arms (Lady Kurda (Noush Skaugen))
- The Matrix Resurrections (Elster)
- Respect (Dinah Washington (Mary J. Blige))
- Top Gun: Maverick (Thermal Control Engineer)
- Gunpowder Milkshake (Madeline (Carla Gugino))
- The Black Phone (Finney Blake (Mason Thames))
- Black Panther: Wakanda Forever (Mining Tribe Elder (Zainab Jah))
- St. Elmo's Fire (Naomi (Anna Maria Horsford)) (Note: The Cinema version)
- Avatar: The Way of Water
- The Woman King (Amensa (Sheila Atim))
- Brahmāstra: Part One – Shiva (Junoon (Mouni Roy))

==== Animation ====
- Carmen Sandiego (The Mechanic)
- Kung Fu Panda 4
- Star Wars: Young Jedi Adventures (Brayg)
- SpongeBob SquarePants (Mrs. Up-Turn, etc.)
- Future-Worm! (Mode, Uga, Mrs. Close)
- Tuca & Bertie (Tuca Toucan)
- Hilda (Captain Draugen)
- BoJack Horseman (Dr. Janet, Carla)
- The Magic School Bus Rides Again (Tim)
- Spider-Man (2017 TV series) (Female Fortune Teller, Female Wrestler)
- The Bad Guys series (Tarantula)
  - The Bad Guys: A Very Bad Holiday
  - The Bad Guys: Haunted Heist
- Batman: Caped Crusader (Oswalda Cobblepot / Penguin)
