= Yū Wakui =

Japanese voice actress

- 和久井 優
- Born: 24 January 1995 (age 31)
- Occupation: Voice actor
- Years active: 2014–present
- Agent: Amitty
- Notable work: Aikatsu! as Sumire; A Galaxy Next Door as Shiori; Three Leaves, Three Colors as Yōko
- Height: 166 cm (5 ft 5 in)
- Website: Official website

Yū Wakui (和久井 優, Wakui Yū; born 24 January 1995) is a Japanese voice actress affiliated with Mitt Management talent agency. She studied ballet from a young age, which helped create an interest in theatre and performance. During high school, she began the theatrical studies that led her to become a voice actor.

Her debut role in voice acting was in 2014 as Sumire Hikami, one of the main characters in the Aikatsu!. In 2016, she voiced Yōko Nishikawa, one of the three protagonists in Three Leaves, Three Colors. She was cast in 2020 as Toru Asakura in The Idolmaster Shiny Colors series of singing video games, and has had over 15 musical album releases as that character. Many of these Idolmaster Shiny Colors albums charted highly on the Oricon music charts.

Wakui played the lead role of Shiori Goshiki (opposite Taku Yashiro as Ichiro Kuga) in the 2023 anime adaptation of A Galaxy Next Door.

== Biography ==
=== Personal life ===
Yū Wakui was born on 24 January 1995 and grew up in Tochigi Prefecture, Japan. She enjoys Japanese calligraphy, playing the piano and flute, and performing classical ballet. She took lessons in classical ballet from a young age, which helped create an interest in theatre and performance.

=== Career ===
Wakui wanted to work in the performing arts, so she researched various theatrical companies and training schools while in high school before settling on Himawari Theatre Group because they offered full-time training courses. To balance her high school and theatre studies, she commuted between Tochigi and Tokyo until she graduated, at which point she switched to theatrical studies full time.

She enjoyed anime and voice acting, so she started working as a voice actor to challenge herself. Her debut voice role was in 2014 as Sumire Hikami, one of the main characters in seasons 3 and 4 of the Aikatsu! television series as well as the sequel series Aikatsu Stars! (2018) and the hybrid live-action and animated Aikatsu on Parade! (2019). Aikatsu! The Movie was released in 2014, with three more animated Aikatsu! films in 2015, 2016, and 2022, as well as three Aikatsu! video games in 2014, 2015, and 2016.

In 2016, Wakui voiced Yōko Nishikawa, one of the protagonists in the anime television series Three Leaves, Three Colors. As part of that series, a Clover Kakumation music album was released in April that year featuring singing by Wakui, Mai Kanazawa, and Ayaka Imamura. It debuted on the Oricon charts at #40 and remained on the chart for nine weeks. A second music album, Gūchoki Parade, debuted the same month at #46 and remained on the chart for five weeks. In a 2017 Nissin Cup Noodle commercial, she played a younger Sazae Fuguta as part of the "Hungry Days" advertising series.

From her debut in 2014 until the end of October 2022, Wakui was represented by Himawari Theatre Group. She was a free agent until 12 January 2023, when she signed with the Mitt Management talent agency.

Wakui was announced in February 2022 for the lead role of Shiori Goshiki (opposite Taku Yashiro as Ichiro Kuga) in the anime adaptation of A Galaxy Next Door. The series begain airing in April 2023.

==== Idolmaster series ====
Beginning in 2020, she played the role of Toru Asakura in The Idolmaster Shiny Colors series of idol star video games. Several tie-in music albums featuring characters from the games were released for the series, most of them charting high on the Oricon charts. The first three Idolmaster Shiny Colors albums all debuted at #4 on the Oricon charts: Gradate Wing 01 (April 2020, charting for 31 weeks), and Gradate Wing 07 in September 2020) remained charted for 20 weeks, and Colorful Feathers -Sol- (March 2021) remained charted for seven weeks. Layered Wing 01 (April 2021) debuted at #6 and stayed on the charts for nine weeks.

As of April 2023, the album that charted the highest was Voyager: Shiny Colors Edition (August 2021), which debuted at #2 and remained on the charts for 21 weeks. Layered Wing 07 was released in October that year, debuting at #6 on the charts, and staying charted for eight weeks.

April 2022 saw the release of two albums: Panorama Wing 01 (which debuted at #10 and remained charted for six weeks) and 3rd Live Tour Piece on Planet / Tokyo (debuted at #11 and was charted for four weeks). The related 3rd Live Tour Piece on Planet / Fukuoka was released the following month, debuting at #6 and remaining charted for three weeks. Synthe-Side 02 was released in July. It debuted at #25 and remained charted for four weeks. The next album, Panorama Wing 07, remained charted for seven weeks after debuting at #9.

The Idolmaster Shiny Colors: Wing Collection was released across two albums in January and February 2023 (respectively). A Side debuted at #20 and stayed on the charts for five weeks. B Side stayed on the charts for three weeks after debuting at #17.

== Filmography ==
Main character roles are indicated in bold in the "Role" column.

=== Anime series ===
List of voice performances in anime
Year	Title	Role	Notes	Ref.
2014	Aikatsu!	**Sumire Hikami**	-	
2016	Mr. Osomatsu	Flower Fairy	-	
2016	Three Leaves, Three Colors	**Yōko Nishikawa**	-	
2016	Aikatsu Stars!	**Sumire Hikami**, Nico, Kaoru Kazama, Sakura Maruyama, others	-	
2016	New Game!	various characters	-	
2017	Armed Girl's Machiavellism	various characters	-	
2017	Restaurant to Another World	Hannah	season 2 episode 2	
2018	Butlers: Chitose Momotose Monogatari	Ayama Kitazono, Takashi Mikuni (child)	-	
2018	Aikatsu Friends!	Ulala Utagawa, Charles Charlotte	-	
2019	Doraemon	Tennin	-	
2019	Senryu Girl	various characters	-	
2019	Cardfight!! Vanguard	female customer	-	
2019	Aikatsu on Parade!	**Sumire Hikami**, Charles Charlotte	-	
2020	Asteroid in Love	girl	-	
2020	A3!	passerby	-	
2020	By the Grace of the Gods	Maylene	-	
2021	Aikatsu Planet!	Modern Eau de Parfum	-	
2021	Life Lessons with Uramichi Oniisan	child, college student	-	
2023	Kaina of the Great Snow Sea	Sūro	-	
2023	Tomo-chan Is a Girl!	Hanao-sensei	-	
2023	A Galaxy Next Door	**Shiori Goshiki**	-	
2024	Delico's Nursery	Lucia Lorca	-	
2024	The Most Notorious "Talker" Runs the World's Greatest Clan	Noel Stollen (young)	-	
2025	Beheneko: The Elf-Girl's Cat Is Secretly an S-Ranked Monster!	Feri	-	
2025	City the Animation	Riko Izumi	-	
2027	Isshiki-san Wants to Know About Love	Rena Yamakawa	-	

=== Anime films ===
List of voice performances in film
Year	Title	Role	Notes	Ref.
2014	Aikatsu! The Movie	**Sumire Hikami**	-	
2015	Aikatsu! Music Awards - The Show Where Everyone Gets an Award!	**Sumire Hikami**	-	
2016	Aikatsu! The Targeted Magical Aikatsu Card	**Sumire Hikami**	-	
2022	Aikatsu Planet! The Movie	Modern Eau de Parfum	-	

=== Video games ===
List of voice performances in video games
Year	Title	Role	Notes	Ref.
2014	Aikatsu! 365-Nichi no Idol Days	**Sumire Hikami**	-	
2015	Aikatsu! My No. 1 Stage!	**Sumire Hikami**	-	
2016	Aikatsu! Photo on Stage!!	**Sumire Hikami**	-	
2016	Puzzle of Empires	Minamoto no Yoshitsune, Pericles	-	
2016	Yome Collection	Yōko Nishikawa	-	
2017	Quiz RPG: The World of Mystic Wiz	Maya Stilma	-	
2018	The Idolmaster Shiny Colors	**Toru Asakura**	voiced from 2020 to 2022	
2018	Super Robot Wars X-Omega	Sumire Hikami	-	
2018	Tokimeki Idol	**Francesca Tanaka**	-	
2019	Kirara Fantasia	Yōko Nishikawa	-	
2019	Doraemon Story of Seasons	Serena, Kiiron (one of the korpokkur)	-	
2022	The Idolmaster Pop Links	Toru Asakura	-	
2023	Arknights	Vendela	-	
2024	Reverse: 1999	Marcus	-	
2025	Cookie Run: Kingdom	Cream Soda Cookie		
2025	Azur Lane	Bois Belleau		

=== Commercials ===
List of performances in commercial advertisements
Year	Title	Role	Notes	Ref.
2017	Nissin Cup Noodle Hungry Days Sazae-san version	**Sazae Fuguta**	Set in Sazae-san's high school days.	

== Discography ==
List of albums containing her work, listed by date of release
Title	Album details	Peak positions		Notes	Ref.
Title	Album details	JPN	JPN Hot	Notes	Ref.
クローバー♣かくめーしょん (Clover Kakumation)	Released: 20 April 2016; Label: Toho; Catalog #: THCS-60092; Formats: CD, download, streaming	40	85	Charted for 9 weeks on Oricon. Three Leaves, Three Colors series	
ぐーちょきパレード (Gūchoki Parade)	Released: 20 April 2016; Label: Toho; Catalog #: THCS-60093; Formats: CD, download, streaming	46		Charted for 5 weeks. Three Leaves, Three Colors series	
「三者三葉」キャラクターソング Vol.1 ("Three Leaves, Three Colors" Character Song Vol. 1)	Released: 18 May 2016 (JPN); Label: Toho; Catalog #: THCS-60095; Formats: CD, download, streaming			Three Leaves, Three Colors series	
Dreaming-ing!!	Released: 17 January 2018; Label: Konami Digital Entertainment; Catalog #: GFCA-00434/5; Formats: CD			Tokimeki Idol series	
カン違いSummer Days (Kanchigai Summer Days)	Released: 11 July 2018; Label: Sony Music Solutions; Catalog #: GFCA-437; Formats: CD, download			Tokimeki Idol series	
The Idolmaster Shiny Colors: Gradate Wing 01	Released: 8 April 2020; Label: Lantis; Catalog #: LACM-14982; Formats: CD	4		Charted for 31 weeks. The Idolmaster Shiny Colors series.	
The Idolmaster Shiny Colors: Gradate Wing 07	Released: 16 September 2020; Label: Lantis; Catalog #: LACM-24005; Formats: CD	4		Charted for 20 weeks. The Idolmaster Shiny Colors series.	
The Idolmaster Shiny Colors: Colorful Feathers -Sol-	Released: 10 March 2021; Label: Lantis; Catalog #: LACA-15863; Formats: CD	4		Charted for 7 weeks. The Idolmaster Shiny Colors series.	
The Idolmaster Shiny Colors: Layered Wing 01	Released: 14 April 2021; Label: Lantis; Catalog #: LACM-24111; Formats: CD	6		Charted for 9 weeks. The Idolmaster Shiny Colors series.	
Voyager【シャイニーカラーズ盤】 Voyager: Shiny Colors Edition	Released: 4 August 2021; Label: Lantis; Catalog #: LACM-24165; Formats: CD	2		Charted for 21 weeks. The Idolmaster Shiny Colors series.	
The Idolmaster Shiny Colors: Layered Wing 07	Released: 13 October 2021; Label: Lantis; Catalog #: LACM-24117; Formats: CD	6		Charted for 8 weeks. The Idolmaster Shiny Colors series.	
The Idolmaster Shiny Colors Solo Collection: Layered Wing part 1	Released: 14 February 2022; Label: Lantis; Catalog #: LACZ-10090/1; Formats: CD			The Idolmaster Shiny Colors series.	
The Idolmaster Shiny Colors Solo Collection: Layered Wing part 2	Released: 14 February 2022; Label: Lantis; Catalog #: LACZ-10092/3; Formats: CD			The Idolmaster Shiny Colors series.	
The Idolmaster Shiny Colors: Panorama Wing 01	Released: 13 April 2022; Label: Lantis; Catalog #: LACM-24251; Formats: CD	10		Charted for 6 weeks. The Idolmaster Shiny Colors series.	
The Idolmaster Shiny Colors: 3rd Live Tour Piece on Planet / Tokyo	Released: 20 April 2022; Label: Lantis; Catalog #: LABX-8545/7; Formats: Blu-ray	11		Charted for 4 weeks. The Idolmaster Shiny Colors series.	
The Idolmaster Shiny Colors: 3rd Live Tour Piece on Planet / Fukuoka	Released: 18 May 2022; Label: Lantis; Catalog #: LABX-8548/50; Formats: Blu-ray	6		Charted for 3 weeks. The Idolmaster Shiny Colors series.	
The Idolmaster Shiny Colors: Synthe-Side 02	Released: 13 July 2022; Label: Lantis; Catalog #: LACM-24245; Formats: CD	25		Charted for 4 weeks. The Idolmaster Shiny Colors series.	
The Idolmaster Shiny Colors: Panorama Wing 07	Released: 12 October 2022; Label: Lantis; Catalog #: LACM-24257; Formats: CD	9		Charted for 7 weeks. The Idolmaster Shiny Colors series.	
The Idolmaster Shiny Colors: Wing Collection - A Side	Released: 18 January 2023; Label: Lantis; Catalog #: LACA-9946/7; Formats: CD	20		Charted for 5 weeks. The Idolmaster Shiny Colors series.	
The Idolmaster Shiny Colors: Wing Collection - B Side	Released: 8 February 2023; Label: Lantis; Catalog #: LACA-9948/9; Formats: CD	17		Charted for 3 weeks. The Idolmaster Shiny Colors series.	
The Idolmaster Shiny Colors Solo Collection - Masters of Idol World!!!!! 2023	Released: 11 February 2023; Label: Columbia Japan; Catalog #: SACX-1087; Formats: CD			Special release from a Tokyo Dome event. The Idolmaster Shiny Colors series.	
