= Ayaka Ōhashi =

Japanese voice actress and singer (born 1994)

- 大橋 彩香
- Born: September 13, 1994 (age 32); Urawa, Saitama, Japan
- Occupations: Voice actress; singer
- Years active: 2012–present
- Agent: INSPION Agency
- Musical career
- Genres: J-pop; anison
- Instruments: Vocals; drums
- Years active: 2014–present
- Label: Lantis
- Member of: Poppin'Party
- Website: ohashiayaka.com

Ayaka Ōhashi (大橋 彩香, Ōhashi Ayaka; born September 13, 1994) is a Japanese voice actress and singer from Tokyo. She is affiliated with the talent agency INSPION Agency. As a singer, she is signed under Lantis. Originally a child actress, she appeared in many commercials, dramas, NHK Educational TV programs, and stage productions. After participating in an audition sponsored by Horipro, she played her first main role as Fleur Blanc in the anime Eureka Seven AO in 2012.

She is known for her roles as Ran Shibuki in Aikatsu!, Uzuki Shimamura in The Idolmaster Cinderella Girls, Vodka in Umamusume: Pretty Derby, Sāya Yamabuki in BanG Dream!, and Hotaru in Shine Post; as Sāya she is a member of the band Poppin'Party as its drummer. She also performed theme songs for anime such as Masamune-kun's Revenge, and Knight's & Magic.

== Biography ==
Ōhashi was born in Urawa, Saitama on September 13, 1994, and moved to Tokyo when she was five. There, she joined a theater company and appearing in various television commercials, dramas, NHK Educational TV programs, and stage productions. She was inspired to become a voice actress after receiving voice acting lessons she had with her theater company.

In 2011, she participated in the 36th Horipro Talent Scout Campaign where she remained a finalist and joined the talent agency Horipro. She made her voice acting debut in 2012, playing a minor character in Amagami SS+ plus. In April of the same year, she was cast as Fleur Blanc in Eureka Seven AO thus becoming her first main role. Later that year, she was cast as Uzuki Shimamura in the mobile game The Idolmaster Cinderella Girls becoming her second main role. She would later reprise the role in various other media, including the anime adaptation. She has since appeared in many stage events and radio programs.

In 2014, she made her official debut as a singer for Lantis by performing Sabagebu! -Survival Game Club!-'s opening theme song "YES!!" which she also played the main character, Momoka Sonokawa. That same year, she voiced the character Kurome in Akame ga Kill!. Her first album ~Kidō ~Start Up! (起動~Start Up!) was released on May 18, 2016; the album peaked at fourteenth on the Oricon weekly charts.

In 2015, she was cast as a drummer character, Sāya Yamabuki of the band Poppin'Party, in Bushiroad's multimedia franchise BanG Dream!. She has stated that although she had drumming skill prior to joining the franchise, she had never performed them in public.

In 2017, she played the character Aki Adagaki in Masamune-kun's Revenge which she also performed the opening theme song. Later that year, she was cast as Adeltroot Alter in Knight's & Magic; she also performed the series' ending theme song. The following year, she was cast as Vodka in Cygames's multimedia franchise Umamusume: Pretty Derby.

In February 2020, Anime Frontier announced that Ōhashi would perform her first U.S. concert on May 8 in Fort Worth, Texas, but the event was cancelled due to the COVID-19 pandemic.

On June 23, 2026, it was announced that she would be leaving HoriPro International at the end of the month. She subsequently joined the agency Inspion on July 1, 2026.

== Filmography ==
=== Anime ===
List of voice performances in anime
Year	Title	Role	Notes	Source
2012	Amagami SS+ plus	Executive committee	Ep. 10	
2012	Eureka Seven AO	Fleur Blanc	Also OVA and ONA	
2012–2016	Aikatsu!	Ran Shibuki	Speaking voice	
2013	Mangirl!	Ringo Nishijima		
2013	Encouragement of Climb	Female customer	Ep. 9	
2013	Fantasista Doll	Uzume Uno		
2013–2015	Tesagure! Bukatsu-mono	Koharu Tanaka	Also Encore and spin-off	
2013–2014	Dokidoki! PreCure	Lance		
2014	Witchcraft Works	Student		
2014–2015	Hamatora: The Animation	Rei	Also Re:_Hamatora	
2014	Go! Go! 575	Matcha Kobayashi		
2014	Daimidaler the Sound Robot	Moriko Tomoyose		
2014	Dragon Collection	Namoor	Ep. 9	
2014	Sabagebu! -Survival Game Club!-	Momoka Sonokawa		
2014	Akame ga Kill!	Kurome		
2015–2019	The Idolmaster Cinderella Girls	Uzuki Shimamura	Also season 2 and Theater	
2015	Comet Lucifer	Felia		
2015–2016	Concrete Revolutio: Superhuman Phantasmagoria	Jackie	Also The Last Song	
2015	Garo: Crimson Moon	Kaguya		
2016	Endride	Falarion		
2016–2018	Aikatsu Stars!	Yozora Kasumi, Ran Shibuki	Speaking voice	
2016	Naria Girls	Idol monster	Ep. 3	
2016	Flip Flappers	Yayaka		
2017–2023	Masamune-kun's Revenge	Aki Adagaki	Also season 2	
2017–2021	BanG Dream!	Sāya Yamabuki	Also season 2 and 3	
2017	Re:Creators	Setsuna Shimazaki		
2017	Hina Logi: From Luck & Logic	Aoi Iroha		
2017	Knight's & Magic	Adeltroot Alter		
2017	Princess Principal	Prefect	Ep. 10	
2017–2018	Garo: Vanishing Line	Lizzy	Ep. 16, 20, 22-23	
2018	Magical Girl Ore	Saki Uno (female)		
2018–2021	Umamusume: Pretty Derby	Vodka		
2018–2019	Aikatsu Friends!	Mirai Asuka		
2018	Future Card Buddyfight Ace	Sayaka Tatewaki		
2018–2022	BanG Dream! Girls Band Party! Pico	Sāya Yamabuki	ONA	
2018–2019	Saint Seiya: Saintia Shō	Lumi	ONA	
2018	Million Arthur	Kaguya	Ep. 9	
2019	Fight League: Gear Gadget Generators	Kara Fixx	ONA	
2019	Hensuki: Are You Willing to Fall in Love with a Pervert, as Long as She's a Cutie?	Koharu Ōtori		
2019–2020	Aikatsu on Parade!	Ran Shibuki, Yozora Kasumi, Mirai Asuka		
2020–2022	Magia Record: Puella Magi Madoka Magica Side Story	Kaede Akino		
2020	Haikyu!! To The Top	Maiko Yonezawa	Ep.1	
2020	The God of High School	Yoo Mira		
2020	Princess Connect! Re:Dive	Hatsune Kashiwazaki		
2020	Super HxEros	Tōma Taiga		
2020	Sleepy Princess in the Demon Castle	Harpy		
2022	The Greatest Demon Lord Is Reborn as a Typical Nobody	Sylphy Marheaven		
2022	Shin Ikki Tousen	Chūbō Sonken		
2022	Shine Post	Hotaru		
2023	Handyman Saitou in Another World	Mevena		
2023	Synduality: Noir	Ange		
2023	Sound! Euphonium: Ensemble Contest	Tsubame Kamaya	OVA	
2024	The Strongest Tank's Labyrinth Raids	Lilia		
2024	Blue Archive the Animation	Serika Kuromi		
2024	VTuber Legend: How I Went Viral After Forgetting to Turn Off My Stream	Nekoma Hirune		
2024	Goodbye, Dragon Life	Christina		
2026	The Daughter of the Demon Lord Is Too Kind!	Jahi		
2026–2027	Star Detective Precure!	Ageseine		
2026	An Observation Log of My Fiancée Who Calls Herself a Villainess	Joanna Curtswarren		
2026	Magical Sisters LuluttoLilly	Lin Wataya		
2026	Nia Liston: The Merciless Maiden	Lilimi Silver		
2026	Tetsuryō! Meet with Tetsudō Musume	Juri Okuwa		
2026	Bleach: Thousand-Year Blood War	Ichika Abarai		

=== Films ===
List of voice performances in feature films
Year	Title	Role	Notes	Source
2013	Pretty Cure All Stars New Stage 2: Friends of the Heart	Lance		
2013	DokiDoki! PreCure The Movie	Lance		
2014	Pretty Cure All Stars New Stage 3: Eternal Friends	Lance		
2014	Aikatsu! The Movie	Ran Shibuki	Speaking voice	
2015	Pretty Cure All Stars: Carnival of Spring♪	Lance		
2016	Garo: Divine Flame	Christina		
2016	Aikatsu Stars! The Movie	Yozora Kasumi	Speaking voice	
2019	BanG Dream! Film Live	Sāya Yamabuki		
2021	BanG Dream! Episode of Roselia I: Promise	Sāya Yamabuki		
2021	BanG Dream! Film Live 2nd Stage	Sāya Yamabuki		
2022	BanG Dream! Poppin' Dream!	Sāya Yamabuki		

=== Video games ===
List of voice performances in video games
Year	Title	Role	Notes	Source
2011	The Idolmaster Cinderella Girls	Uzuki Shimamura	iOS, Android	
2012	Eureka Seven: AO Attack the Legend	Fleur Blanc	PS3	
2013	Fairy Fencer F	Karin	PS3	
2013	Fantasista Doll Girls Royale	Uzume Uno	iOS, Android	
2014	The Idolmaster One For All	Uzuki Shimamura	PS3	
2015	Granblue Fantasy	Uzuki Shimamura, Miamint	iOS, Android	
2015	Princess Connect!	Hatsune Kashiwazaki	iOS, Android	
2015	Brave Sword X Blaze Soul	Mei	iOS, Android	
2015	Luminous Arc Infinity	Rena	PS Vita	
2015	The Idolmaster Cinderella Girls: Starlight Stage	Uzuki Shimamura	iOS, Android	
2015	Fairy Fencer F: Advent Dark Force	Karin	PS4	
2015	Valkyrie Drive: Siren	Setsuna Kisaragi	iOS, Android	
2015	MeiQ: Labyrinth of Death	Estra	PS Vita	
2016	Tales of Asteria	Uzuki Shimamura	iOS, Android	
2016	Dark Rose Valkyrie	Coo Franson	PS4	
2017	BanG Dream! Girls Band Party!	Sāya Yamabuki	iOS, Android	
2017	Yuki Yuna is a Hero: A Sparkling Flower	Wakaba Nogi	iOS, Android	
2017	Magia Record: Puella Magi Madoka Magica Side Story	Kaede Akino	iOS, Android	
2017	8 beat Story	Kanade Sorano	iOS, Android	
2018	Princess Connect! Re:Dive	Hatsune Kashiwazaki	iOS, Android	
2018	Dragalia Lost	Melody	iOS, Android	
2018	Final Fantasy Brave Exvius	Heavenly Technician Lid	iOS, Android	
2018	Tales of the Rays	Uzuki Shimamura	iOS, Android	
2019	Azur Lane	KMS Z35, USS Aylwin, IJN Choukai	iOS, Android	
2019	Arknights	Angelina	iOS, Android	
2019	The King of Fighters All Star	New Kim	iOS, Android	
2020	Ikki Tousen: Extra Burst	Chūbō Sonken	iOS, Android	
2021	Blue Archive	Serika Kuromi	iOS, Android	
2021	Umamusume: Pretty Derby	Vodka	iOS, Android	
2021	Eve: Ghost Enemies	Kyouko Kirino	PS4, Switch	
2021	Code Geass: Lelouch of the Rebellion Lost Stories	Maya Disel	PC, iOS, Android	
2022	Artery Gear: Fusion	Nio, Grace	iOS, Android	
2023	Path to Nowhere	MBCC-S-026 Mantis	iOS, Android	
2024	Genshin Impact	Iansan	PC, iOS, Android< PS4, PS5	
2026	Arknights: Endfield	Gilberta	PC, iOS, Android, PS5	
2026	100% Orange Juice	Mimomo	PC	
2026	Final Fantasy Resonance	Lid	PC, Switch, Switch 2, PS5, Xbox S	

=== Dubbing ===
==== Live-action ====
- Beautiful Love, Wonderful Life, Kim Cheong-ah (Seol In-ah)
- Chip 'n Dale: Rescue Rangers, Det. Ellie Steckler (KiKi Layne)
- The Green Knight, Essel and the Lady (Alicia Vikander)

==== Animation ====
- Mune: Guardian of the Moon, Mune
- The Nut Job 2: Nutty by Nature, Heather Muldoon

=== Live-action ===
- Anime Supremacy! (2022), Yūki (voice)

=== Others ===
- There's No Freaking Way I'll be Your Lover! Unless..., Renako Amaori (promotional video)

== Discography ==
=== Studio albums ===
List of albums, with selected chart positions
Title	Album details	Catalogue No.		Oricon	
Title	Album details	Regular edition	Limited edition	Peak position	Weeks charted
~Kidō ~Start Up!~ (起動~Start Up!)	Released: May 18, 2016; Label: Lantis; Format: CD, CD + DVD, CD + Blu-ray, digital download	LACA-15543	LACA-35544 (CD+DVD); LACA-35543 (CD+Blu-ray)	14	3
PROGRESS	Released: April 23, 2018; Label: Lantis; Format: CD, CD + Blu-ray, digital download	LACA-15719	LACA-35719	24	2
WINGS	Released: December 16, 2020; Label: Lantis	LACA-15850	LACA-35850	24	2

=== Singles ===
List of singles, with selected chart positions
Release date	Title	Catalogue No. (Regular edition)	Oricon		Album	Notes
Release date	Title	Catalogue No. (Regular edition)	Peak position	Weeks charted	Album	Notes
August 6, 2014	"YES!!"	LACM-14264	35	4	~Kidō ~Start Up!~ (起動~Start Up!)	Opening theme song for Sabagebu! -Survival Game Club!-
February 25, 2015	"ENERGY☆SMILE"	LACM-14314	37	3	~Kidō ~Start Up!~ (起動~Start Up!)	—N/a
November 11, 2015	"Oshiete Blue Sky" (おしえてブルースカイ)	LACM-14417	33	3	~Kidō ~Start Up!~ (起動~Start Up!)	1st ending theme song for Comet Lucifer
December 9, 2015	"Hitotsu ni Naritai" (ヒトツニナリタイ)	LACM-14428	36	2	~Kidō ~Start Up!~ (起動~Start Up!)	3rd ending theme song for Comet Lucifer
January 18, 2017	"Wagamama MIRROR HEART" (ワガママMIRROR HEART)	LACM-14562	17	10	PROGRESS	Opening theme song for Masamune-kun's Revenge
August 14, 2017	"You & I" (ユー&アイ')	LACM-14643	29	6	PROGRESS	Ending theme song for Knight's & Magic
April 18, 2018	"NOISY LOVE POWER☆"	LACM-14738	21	6	WINGS	Opening theme song for Magical Girl Ore
November 21, 2018	"Highlight" (ハイライト)	LACM-14814	35	2	WINGS	1st opening theme song for Million Arthur
August 6, 2019	"Daisuki." (ダイスキ。)	LACM-14889	17	1	WINGS	Opening theme song for Hensuki: Are You Willing to Fall in Love with a Pervert, as Long as She's a Cutie?
January 13, 2021	"DOG & CAT & AYAKA"	LACM-24073	21	2	TBA	Opening theme song for With a Dog AND a Cat, Every Day is Fun
April 27, 2022	"Be My Friend!!!"	LACM-24247	32	4	TBA	Opening theme song for The Greatest Demon Lord Is Reborn as a Typical Nobody
July 26, 2023	"Please, please!"	LACM-24369	27	3	TBA	Opening theme song for Masamune-kun's Revenge second season
