= Knight's & Magic =

Japanese light novel series

- Cover of the first light novel volume featuring Ernesti "Eru" Echevalier

ナイツ&マジック (Naitsu ando Majikku)
- Genre: Isekai, Fantasy, mecha
- Novel series
- Written by: Hisago Amazake-no
- Published by: Shōsetsuka ni Narō
- Original run: 16 October 2010 – 22 October 2024
- Volumes: 11
- Light novel
- Written by: Hisago Amazake-no
- Illustrated by: Kurogin
- Published by: Shufunotomo
- English publisher: NA: J-Novel Club
- Imprint: Hero Bunko
- Original run: 30 January 2013 – present
- Volumes: 12
- Manga
- Written by: Takuji Katō
- Published by: Square Enix
- English publisher: Crunchyroll
- Magazine: Young Gangan
- Original run: 15 April 2016 – 4 March 2022
- Volumes: 17
- Anime television series
- Directed by: Yusuke Yamamoto
- Produced by: Ryutaro Kawakami; Ryota Ozaki; Emi Kashimura
- Written by: Michiko Yokote; Noboru Kimura
- Music by: Masato Kōda
- Studio: Eight Bit
- Licensed by: NA: Crunchyroll
- Original network: AT-X, Tokyo MX, KBS, Sun TV, BS11
- English network: US: Crunchyroll Channel
- Original run: 2 July 2017 – 24 September 2017
- Episodes: 13
- icon

Knight's & Magic (Japanese: ナイツ&マジック, Hepburn: Naitsu ando Majikku) is a Japanese light novel series written by Hisago Amazake-no and illustrated by Kurogin. The series tells the story of a young Japanese man who dies in a car accident and reincarnates as a child in an alternate world where magic and giant robots are real, dedicating himself since then to fulfill his longtime dream of building and piloting his own mecha. It originated as a web novel before being picked up for print publication by Shufunotomo.

A manga adaptation by Takuji Katō is published by Square Enix, and an anime television series adaptation by Eight Bit aired from July to September 2017.

== Premise ==
The story begins when Tsubasa Kurata, a software engineer and hardcore mecha otaku from Japan dies in a car accident. He is later reborn in the fantastical Fremmevilla Kingdom, a medieval world where giant, powerful mechs called Silhouette Knights are used to fight against horrifying creatures called Demon Beasts.

Here, Kurata is reborn as Ernesti "Eru" Echavalier, the son of a noble family. Blessed with exceptional magical abilities and the memories of his past life, he enrolls at the Royal Laihiala Academy, an elite magic school where the pilots of the Silhouette Knights called Knight Runners are being trained to battle threats both from within and outside the kingdom. He later teams up with Adeltrud "Addy" Olter and her twin brother, Archid "Kid" Olter with the goal of piloting a Silhouette Knight of his own creation, something that has been unheard of for centuries.

== Characters ==
Ernesti Echavalier (エルネスティ・エチェバルリア, Erunesuti Echebaruria) / Tsubasa Kurata (倉田翼, Kurata Tsubasa)
Eru: Voiced by: Rie Takahashi (Japanese); Justin Briner (teen), Alexis Tipton (child) (English)
Kurata: Voiced by: Daisuke Sakaguchi (Japanese); Eric Vale (English)
The main protagonist, commonly called as Eru (エル; Ernie in the English dub). He is a boy obsessed with Silhouette Knights since childhood and wants to become a designer and build his own Silhouette Knight to protect his kingdom. Because of his short stature and androgynous looks, he often gets confused for a girl. Tsubasa was a Japanese programmer and a hardcore robot otaku, who was killed in a car accident and reincarnated as Eru in the new world, which explains Eru's own interest in Silhouette Knights. Thanks to his past life, Eru is a genius inventor who has created new inventions like a Gunblade-like magic rod that combines a sword and magic rod into one weapon.
Adeltrud Olter (アデルトルート・オルター, Aderutorūto Orutā)
Voiced by: Ayaka Ōhashi (Japanese); Jeannie Tirado (English)
Commonly called as Addy (アディ, Adi). She is one of Eru's childhood friends and an illegitimate noble. She and her brother initially intend to run away from home but are motivated by Eru's excellence and learn magic from him. Initially fond of Eru for his cute appearance, Addy developed strong feelings for him over time to the point where she finds it hard to be apart from him. She marries Eru at the end of Volume 9 of the light novel.
Archid Olter (アーキッド・オルター, Ākiddo Orutā)
Voiced by: Shinsuke Sugawara (Japanese); Stephen Fu (English)
Commonly called as Kid (キッド, Kiddo). He is Addy's twin brother and another of Eru's childhood friends who also learn magic from him. Because he and his sister are illegitimate children of Marquis Serrati and his mistress, he does not get along with his father and his legal family, especially his older-half brother Baltsar who despises them as the latter fears their father might legitimize them and make Kid his heir. The granddaughter of King Ambrosius develops affection for him as a result of a rescue romance; she is the queen of Kerspercha, the neighboring kingdom.
Edgar C. Blanche (エドガー・C・ブランシュ, Edogā C Buranshu)
Voiced by: Yasuaki Takumi (Japanese); Christopher Wehkamp (English)
Eru's senior and considered the top Knight Runner in the school. His Silhouette Knight is armed with a shield. Generally, his character was frequently described and considered as consistently competent, but he often indicated his inflexible mind and conservative view.
Dietrich Knitz (ディートリヒ・クーニッツ, Dītorihi Kūnittsu)
Voiced by: Kazuyuki Okitsu (Japanese); Josh Grelle (English)
One of Eru's seniors and a Knight Runner. He is rather arrogant but after running away during a fight against a behemoth, he changes his behavior and becomes more responsible. Since the change of behavior, due to the aftermath of a fight against a behemoth, he becomes rather aggressive for some period.
Helvi Oberi (ヘルヴィ・オーバーリ, Heruvi Ōbāri)
Voiced by: Shizuka Itō (Japanese); Morgan Garrett (English)
Another of Eru's seniors and a Knight Runner. She is filled with a determination to win. Helvi seems to be the only other female Knight Runner of the Silver Phoenix Order besides Addy.
Batson Termonen (バトソン・テルモネン, Batoson Terumonen)
Voiced by: Natsumi Fujiwara (Japanese); Ryan Reynolds (English)
A dwarf boy who wants to become a blacksmith and a friend of Eru.
David Hepken (ダーヴィド・ヘプケン, Dāvido Hepuken)
Voiced by: Atsushi Imaruoka (Japanese); Cris George (English)
A dwarf engineer in training who is friends with Eru. He is commonly called "Boss". David tends to hit Batson because he cannot hit Eru, Addy, and Kid (due to their noble lineage) when they aggravate him.
Stefania Serrati (ステファニア・セラーティ, Sutefania Serāti)
Voiced by: Sayaka Senbongi (Japanese); Tia Ballard (English)
The Laihiala Academy's Student Council President and Addy and Kid's older half-sister. Despite their illegitimate status, she treats Addy and Kid as part of her family. Like Addy, she loves to dote on Eru. After graduation, she chose to go back to her father and become an assistant to her father who is a Marquis.
Lauri Echavalier (ラウリ・エチェバルリア, Rauri Echebaruria)
Voiced by: Masaru Ikeda (Japanese); John Swasey (English)
Eru's grandfather and principal of the Laihiala Knights Academy. He was formally an assistant of the old king, one of his old classmates.
Mathias Echavalier (マティアス・エチェバルリア, Matiasu Echebaruria)
Voiced by: Hidetaka Tenjin (Japanese); Aaron Roberts (English)
Eru's father and a Knight Runner.
Celestina Echavalier (セレスティナ・エチェバルリア, Seresutina Echebaruria)
Voiced by: Sayaka Ohara (Japanese); Rachael Messer (English)
Eru's mother who taught him magic. She is the narrator of the series.
Olver Bromdal (オルヴァー・ブロムダール)
Voiced by: Yoshitsugu Matsuoka (Japanese); Jerry Jewell (English)
Director of Silhouette Knight Laboratory and member of the Alv race. He is the current representative of his race, due to being the youngest at 84.

== Media ==
=== Web novel ===
Hisago Amazake-no began publishing the series as a web novel on the Shōsetsuka ni Narō website on 16 October 2010. As of 22 October 2024, eleven novels have been published, comprising a total of 218 chapters.

=== Light novel ===
Publisher Shufunotomo acquired the series for print publication, and published the first volume with illustrations by Kurogin under their Hero Bunko imprint in January 2013. Twelve volumes have been released as of 27 December 2025. During their Anime Expo 2023 panel, J-Novel Club announced that they licensed the light novel.

==== Volumes ====
| No. | Original release date | Original ISBN | English release date | English ISBN |
|---|---|---|---|---|
| 1 | 30 January 2013 | 978-4-07-288159-0 | 8 October 2023 | 978-1-7183-8853-6 |
| 2 | 31 May 2013 | 978-4-07-289667-9 | 4 January 2024 | 978-1-7183-8855-0 |
| 3 | 30 September 2013 | 978-4-07-292729-8 | 28 April 2024 | 978-1-7183-8857-4 |
| 4 | 28 April 2014 | 978-4-07-296348-7 | 28 August 2024 | 978-1-7183-8859-8 |
| 5 | 30 March 2015 | 978-4-07-412412-1 | 9 January 2025 | 978-1-71-838861-1 |
| 6 | 30 March 2016 | 978-4-07-416172-0 | 24 March 2025 | 978-1-71-838863-5 |
| 7 | 25 March 2017 | 978-4-07-424154-5 | 3 July 2025 | 978-1-71-838865-9 |
| 8 | 30 September 2017 | 978-4-07-427900-5 | 23 October 2025 | 978-1-71-838867-3 |
| 9 | 31 October 2018 | 978-4-07-435471-9 | 12 February 2026 | 978-1-71-838869-7 |
| 10 | 30 September 2020 | 978-4-07-445630-7 | 29 October 2026 | 978-1-71-838871-0 |
| 11 | 29 November 2021 | 978-4-07-450520-3 | 4 March 2027 | 978-1-71-838873-4 |
| 12 | 27 December 2025 | 978-4-07-462864-3 | — | — |

=== Manga ===
Artist Takuji Katō began serializing a manga adaptation of the novels in Square Enix's seinen manga magazine Young Gangan on 15 April 2016. Crunchyroll is publishing the manga digitally since 5 July 2017.

==== Volumes ====
| No. | Japanese release date | Japanese ISBN |
|---|---|---|
| 1 | 24 September 2016 | 978-4-7575-5108-4 |
| 2 | 23 March 2017 | 978-4-7575-5254-8 |
| 3 | 24 June 2017 | 978-4-7575-5389-7 |
| 4 | 25 September 2017 | 978-4-7575-5484-9 |
| 5 | 24 March 2018 | 978-4-7575-5670-6 |
| 6 | 25 July 2018 | 978-4-7575-5792-5 |
| 7 | 24 November 2018 | 978-4-7575-5919-6 |
| 8 | 25 March 2019 | 978-4-7575-6071-0 |
| 9 | 25 July 2019 | 978-4-7575-6213-4 |
| 10 | 25 November 2019 | 978-4-7575-6400-8 |
| 11 | 25 March 2020 | 978-4-7575-6573-9 |
| 12 | 22 July 2020 | 978-4-7575-6765-8 |
| 13 | 25 November 2020 | 978-4-7575-6955-3 |
| 14 | 25 March 2021 | 978-4-7575-7166-2 |
| 15 | 26 July 2021 | 978-4-7575-7385-7 |
| 16 | 25 November 2021 | 978-4-7575-7594-3 |
| 17 | 25 March 2022 | 978-4-7575-7836-4 |

=== Anime ===
An anime television series adaptation was announced via a wraparound band on the first volume of the manga on 24 September 2016. The anime aired from 2 July – 24 September 2017. It is directed by Yusuke Yamamoto at Eight Bit, with scripts written by Michiko Yokote, and music composed by Masato Kōda. Fhána performed the opening theme song "Hello!MyWorld!!" and Ayaka Ohashi performed the ending theme song "You & I". Crunchyroll streamed the anime, while Funimation had licensed the series in North America. Following Sony's acquisition of Crunchyroll, the dub was moved to Crunchyroll.

| No. | Title | Original release date |
|---|---|---|
| 1 | "Robots & Fantasy" | 2 July 2017 |
Tsubasa Kurata, a company programmer and a mecha model fan, is killed in a car accident(Truck-kun). Tsubasa is reincarnated as a young boy named Ernesti "Eru" Echavalier in the Fremmevilla Kingdom in a world where magic exist. After witnessing his father Mathias defeating a demon beast in a mech called Silhouette Knight, Eru is motivated to be a Silhouette Knight pilot - Knight Runner - so that he too can ride one as well. During his magic training which he excels, he befriends the twins, Adeltrud "Addy" and Archid "Kid" Olter and also teaches them his magic skills. When the trio finally enrolled at Laihiala Academy, directed by Eru's grandfather, Eru learns he cannot pilot a Silhouette Knight as he is too young and short but is allowed to skipped to middle school classes after impressing his teachers with his power thanks to his Gunblade magic rod to compensate a magic rod's short range abilities. As Eru becomes 12 years old, he joins a class training trip between the middle and high school students at Cloquet Forest and meets Stefania Serrati, the Olters' older half-sister who the siblings share a complicated relationship since Addy and Kid are illegitimate children. Later that night, the class camp is attacked by a swarm of demon beasts which Eru, Addy, and Kid rescue Stefania and the rest of the students with help of their high school seniors riding Silhouette Knights. Elsewhere, a surviving Silhouette Knight battles a giant demon beast tortoise.
| 2 | "Hero & Beast" | 9 July 2017 |
Behemoth, the giant demon beast tortoise, attacks the gates of Cloquet Forest where the guards die fighting it as one runs to the capital to request the Knights for help. Back at the students camp, Eru realizes something big must have scared the demon beasts into going to their camp and witness the Behemoth appearing. As the student's evacuate, the senior students Silhouette Knights led by Edgar C. Blanche, Helvi Oberi and Dietrich Knitz fight and distract the Behemoth. After seeing one of his comrades killed by the Behemoth's fire breath, Dietrich runs away in fear, which Eru follows him, knocks him out and steal his Guair Silhouette Knight. After improvising the Guair's controls and improving its movements using his magic and programming, Eru rides the Guair into battle and rescuing his seniors by stabbing the Behemoth's left eye with a sword. Despite help from the kingdom's Silhouette Knights, the Behemoth is too strong due to its thick armor and fire breath. In order to defeat it, Eru jumps onto the Behemoth's head and casts lighting into its wounded eye, which transmit to its brain, killing it. At sunrise, the surviving Knight Runners are shocked to discover Guair's pilot was not Dietrich but Eru. Having fun experienced riding a Silhouette Knight, Eru tells his friends that he plans to make a custom Silhouette Knight for himself. Meanwhile, the King of Fremmevilla takes an interest with Eru due to his deeds.
| 3 | "Scrap & Build" | 16 July 2017 |
Eru is summoned by the King who wants to reward him any prize for defeating the Behemoth. Much to the court and his grandfather's shock, Eru asks for the classified schematics of an Ether Reactor, the heart of a Silhouette Knight. When Eru explains he wants to make his dream Silhouette Knight and ride it as his hobby, the King is amused with his answer and agrees to Eru's request if he can build an improved Silhouette Knight first. One of the King's advisers, Marquis Selati, Stefania, Addy and Kid's father, tells his children to report to him if Eru is successful so he may inform the King. Meanwhile, Eru explains his plan to improve a Silhouette Knight's performance to his dwarf friend, Batson, and his senior and Silhouette Knight engineer, David, who is impressed with Eru's idea. Using Helvi's Trandorkis as a testbed, Eru and the Dwarven engineers improves the Trandorkis strength by 30% using stranded crystal tissues and adds two sidearms armed with magic rods behind its back so the Silhouette Knight can fight close range and cast spells at the same time. In the meantime, Eru and Batson also built Silhouette Gears, human size mech suits so that Addy and Kid can learn how to operate Silhouette Knights. With the improvements done, the Trandorkis, now renamed Telestale, performs well in its first test run. Later, Helvi's Telestale battles Edgar's Earlcumber in a mock match and almost win before the Telestale mana runs out. Later that night, the engineers celebrate the Telestale's success and Eru thinks of more Silhouette Knight ideas, unaware that another group is spying on their work.
| 4 | "Light & Shadow" | 23 July 2017 |
While Eru and the engineers try to find a way to fix the Telestale's high mana consumption, Eru also builds weapons for the Silhouette Gears including an automatic crossbow. Addy and Kid reports to their father about the Telestale's performance which he in turn informs Marquis Dixgard. Under Marquis Dixgard orders, the Order of the Scarlet Rabbit has three Telestale Silhouette Knight brought to Fort Casadesus where the Marquis will inspect and test the Knights personally. During the journey, the Scarlet Rabbit convoy is ambushed by a Shaker Worm demon beast which Edgar, Helvi and Dietrich in their Telestales are able to defeat it which impresses Knight Commander Fredholm of the Scarlet Rabbits. Unaware by everyone, the ambush was set up by Order of the Bronze Fang, the spies who have been observing Eru's work. At Fort Casadesus, Marquis Dixgard, who dislikes Eru for breaking the status Quo on Knight design, meets Eru personally. After telling Eru that he will be reporting all new Silhouette Knight design to the King, the Marquis is flabbergasted that Eru does not mind nor is he interested with fame or riches since he wants to make newer and better Silhouette Knight and eventually relents. As Eru's friends head to Fort Casadesus to get him, the Order of the Bronze Fang causes a demon beast attack at a nearby village to lure out the Order of the Scarlet Rabbit so they can attack Fort Casadesus.
| 5 | "Hide & Seek" | 30 July 2017 |
Edgar and Dietrich accompany Batson, David, Kid and Addy in their Silhouette Knights to Fort Casadesus. Meanwhile, Lady Kerhilt and the Bronze Fang Knights managed to sneak into Fort Casadesus and hijack the Fort's Silhouette Knights including the three Telestales. Despite Commander Fredholm and the Scarlet Rabbit Knights attempts to stop them, Lady Kerhilt and two of her subordinates escape the Fort with two of the Telestales. However, the Bronze Fang Knights encounter Edgar and Dietrich on the way which the latter two tries to stop them with Kid and Addy helping in their Silhouette Gears. Upon learning from Batson and David on what happened to the stolen Telestales, Eru dons a Silhouette Gear and helps Commander Fredholm defeat the intruders in the Fort. Elsewhere, Dietrich, Kid and Addy manages to defeat Lady Kerhilt subordinates while she herself defeats Edgar and escapes to Vendobadahla. Dietrich tries to follow her but he and the others are surrounded by demon beasts until Eru and Commander Fredholm arrives to help them. The next morning, Marquis Dixgard is shocked to discover the intruders that attacked the Fort and stole the Telestale were using cursed bait, a forbidden concoction that attracts demon beasts and turns them crazy and concludes this was the work of another nation. Days later, Eru and his friends are thanked by King Ambrosius for their work who also creates a new Order of Knights called the Order of the Silver Phoenix led by Eru to research and create better Silhouette Knights. A recovering Edgar promises Helvi that he will retrieve the stolen Telestale as it was actually her Silhouette Knight.
| 6 | "Trial & Error" | 6 August 2017 |
As a Telestale is sent to the Silhouette Knight Laboratory, the Fremmevilla Kingdom top research lab, whose Directors hope to reverse engineer it and make their own mass-produced Silhouette Knights to impress King Ambrosius, Eru and the Order of the Silver Phoenix begin their work on creating newer and improved Silhouette Knights with help from Marquis Dixgard who delivers two Silhouette Knight companies of Kaldatoahs as base models and Nora Frykberg and the Order of the Azure Hawk capturing the spies who help the Bronze Fang Knights and prevent any more leaks of information from the academy. Eru creates Silhouette Gears for the Knightsmiths to ease their workload and new Silhouette Knight designs and improvements to be added. However, David criticizes Eru for being too focus in his work when his test of using rockets on a Silhouette Knight almost gets him killed. After creating a two seater cockpit for Addy and Kid, a Silhouette Knight shaped like a centaur and magical daggers uses as keys to start a Silhouette Knight to prevent another hijacking attempt, Eru and the Order of the Silver Phoenix heads to the capital to face against the Silhouette Knight Laboratory's Kaldatoah Darsch models in front of King Ambrosius and his ministers.
| 7 | "New & Old" | 13 August 2017 |
The match between the Order of Silver Phoenix and the Laboratory Team ends in a draw, as with the new units' increased power they reached a stalemate against units less advanced, but with more experienced pilots. Some time later, Eru and his friends graduate from Laihiala and move with the rest of the order to Fort Orobesius to dedicate themselves to Silhouette Knight development, and King Ambrosius decides to retire and leave the kingdom to his son, Leotamus. He then approaches Eru and asks him to develop new, exclusive Silhouette Knights for him and his grandson, Prince Emrys. The order then produces two units with the same capabilities, one colored silver, Jilbariga and the other colored gold, Goldleo. When both decide to choose Goldleo, Ambrosius and Emrys decide to settle it with a duel, with Emrys claiming the victory and Ambrosius accepting Jilbariga. Eru soon realizes that Ambrosius was actually testing his grandson's skills.
| 8 | "Secret & Quest" | 20 August 2017 |
When a large group of Shellcased beasts head for Alfheim, the city where the Ether Reactors are developed and home of the Alvs, the Order of Silver Phoenix is dispatched to help defend it, along with Ambrosius and Emrys. With the power of the new units, Eru and co. easily defeat the attackers, with Eru killing the Shellcased queen by himself. After the battle, Ambrosius finally accepts Eru's request to let him learn the secret of how Ether Reactors are created, and takes him to Alfheim, where he is granted permission from the Great Elder Kitley, the leader of the Alvs. He then spends three months there to learn the process and returns with Ambrosius's permission to use the catalysts of the Behemoth and the Shellcased Queen he killed to create a custom Ether Reactor and use it to complete his own, personal Silhouette Knight, Ikaruga.
| 9 | "Force & Justice" | 27 August 2017 |
The Zaloudek Kingdom starts a war to conquer the entire western continent. Using their newest models of Silhouette Knights and transport airships, the forces of Zaloudek easily bypass the defenses of the Kingdom of Kuschpercha. With defeat inevitable, the king requests a duel with the commander of the Zaloudek forces, Prince Cristobal, to buy enough time for his daughter, Princess Eleonora, to escape. The king loses and is killed, but Eleonora ends up captured by the enemy forces, along with her aunt Martina and cousin Isadola, who are also King Leotamus' sister and niece respectively. In response, Leotamus sends the Order of Silver Phoenix along with Emrys to investigate the situation, and after easily defeating the enemies guarding the border, they discover that their Silhouette Knights have the same technology as the Telestale stolen from Fort Casadesus, concluding that the thieves were tied with Zaloudek. Upon hearing that Eleonora is being forced to marry Cristobal, Eru and co. start making plans to rescue her, but news about their presence reach Cristobal, who sends Gustav Mardonnes to track them down. Upon meeting Eru's party, Gustav attacks them, but when they prove themselves too strong for him, he retreats, assisted by Lady Kerhilt.
| 10 | "War & Princess" | 3 September 2017 |
Using special Silhouette Gears, the Order of Silver Phoenix successfully rescue Eleonora, Martina and Isadola. Cristobal sends a party to chase after them, but their pursuers are easily defeated by Eru's Ikaruga and forced to flee. Once reaching safety, Eru's party establishes a base at Nishirie, and agree to provide the remaining Kuschperchan forces with upgrades to their Silhouette Knights in exchange for the scraps of all enemy units defeated by them. With these new upgrades, the Kuschperchan easily fend off an enemy attack on the city, and Lady Kerhilt is ordered to launch a surprise attack on the Silver Phoenix's base to recapture the Princess, in exchange of having her family's name restored. However, Eru and his friends were prepared and easily defeat and capture the Bronze Fang Knights, with Lady Kerhilt killed in a battle against Edgar.
| 11 | "Hit & Away" | 10 September 2017 |
Cristobal leads a large force of Silhouette Knights and airships to crush the Kuschperchan forces at their stronghold and capture Eleonora. However, he falls into a trap made by the Order of Silver Phoenix who now possess Javelin missiles to take down their airships. With his forces routed due to the Silver Phoenix's superior Silhouette Knights, Cristobal's airship tries to escape only to be confronted by the Ikaruga. Eru easily defeats Cristobal in battle which the latter tries to bribe Eru to join his side. But when Eru admits of no interest in nobility, Cristobal falls to his death rather than suffer humiliation of being captured, demoralizing his forces and making them retreat. Eleonora becomes Queen of Kuschperchan and declares the rebirth of their nation. As the combined Silver Phoenix and Kuschperchan forces retake their lands, Oratio Gojass, Zaloudek's top scientist, promises Princess Catalina that he will build a new weapon to avenge her brother's death. Months later, the Silver Phoenix and Kuschperchan forces finally retake a fortress held by Zaloudek, but Oratio's new weapon, a giant airship shaped like a Drake, attacks them.
| 12 | "Knight & Dragon" | 17 September 2017 |
The Vyver, Zaloudek's newest weapon, whose captain, Doloteo Mardones, wants to avenge Cristobal's death, battles the Ikaruga. Meanwhile, a Zaloudek force led by Doloteo's son, Gustavo, battles Dietrich and his men but Gustavo is forced to abandon his Silhouette Knight after Dietrich tricks him into exhausting his mana supply. Eru is unable take down the Vyver due to its defenses and is forced to land the Ikaruga after the Vyver's chaff smoke damages its jet engines. The Vyver is forced to withdraw after exhausting its mana trying to destroy the Ikaruga. As Eru and his allies withdraw, Oratio repairs and installs a bigger Ether Reactor in the Vyver to give it more power and Gustavo receives the Zaloudek's Royal Family Silhouette Knight, Alkeloryx, by Princess Catalina. Meanwhile, after discussing their battle plans, the Silver Phoenix and Kuschperchans agree to Eleonora's strategy where she will lead the entire Kuschperchan army to recapture their capital Delvancul while Eru and the Silver Phoenix Knights battle the Vyver. As the Kuschperchans fight the Zaloudeks at the last fortress that leads to Delvancul, the Vyver arrives, with Oratio onboard, to attack Eleonora's position only to discover Eru has repaired and improved a captured airship to fight them.
| 13 | "Heaven & Earth" | 24 September 2017 |
After drawing the Vyver away from the battlefield, Eru's party launches an attack with Javelin missiles loaded with oil that once ignited, surrounds the enemy ship in flames. In response, Doloteo activates the Vyver's Dragon Blood reactor that surrounds it with a massive energy shield. Meanwhile, on land, an infiltration party hijacks the drawbridge controls, allowing the Kuschperchan forces to invade, while Gustavo is defeated by Edgar with Emrys' help. Back to the sky, Eru breaks through the Vyver's energy shield and attacks it directly, defeating it. In a last effort, Doloteo takes control of the Vyver and attempts to ram it on the Kuschperchan base camp to kill Eleonora, but Eru and Kid stop him, taking down the Vyver for good. After the battle, the Kuschperchan forces take control of Delvancul and Catalina poisons herself to death to avoid capture, thus ending the war with Zaloudek's defeat and Eleonora recognized as Kuschpercha's de facto ruler. Once returning home, Eru is watched by far from Oratio, who survived the Vyver's destruction and departs to look for another country to sell his services to, longing to face Eru in battle again. Back to Flemevilla, Ambrosius commends the Order of Silver Knights for their efforts, and awards Eru with his own laboratory, while the airship's technology is spread along the neighboring countries, ushering a new era of trade and transportation across the continent.

== Reception ==
The manga and the light novels had a combined 1.5 million copies in print as of 16 March 2018.
