= Three Leaves, Three Colors =

Japanese manga and anime series

- Cover of the first manga volume featuring (from left to right) Teru Hayama, Yoko Nishikawa and Futaba Odagiri.

三者三葉 (Sansha San'yō)
- Genre: Comedy
- Manga
- Written by: Cherry Arai
- Published by: Houbunsha
- Magazine: Manga Time Kirara; Manga Time Kirara Carat (Note: The manga is serialized at Manga Time Kirara except between December 2003 to January 2007 when the manga is serialized at Manga Time Kirara Carat.)
- Original run: February 2003 – January 2019
- Volumes: 14
- Anime television series
- Directed by: Yasuhiro Kimura
- Produced by: Takashi Yoshizawa; Masumi Takeuchi; Makoto Kusano; Atsushi Yoshikawa
- Written by: Hidoaki Koyasu
- Music by: Shūhei Mutsuki
- Studio: Doga Kobo
- Licensed by: AUS: Madman Entertainment; NA: Funimation
- Original network: Tokyo MX, AT-X, BS11, KBS, Sun TV
- Original run: April 11, 2016 – June 27, 2016
- Episodes: 12

Three Leaves, Three Colors (Japanese: 三者三葉, Hepburn: Sansha San'yō; lit. "Tripartite Trefoil") is a Japanese four-panel manga series by Cherry Arai, serialized in Houbunsha's Manga Time Kirara magazine since February 2003 and fourteen tankōbon volumes have been collected so far. An anime adaptation by Doga Kobo aired from April to June 2016.

== Plot ==
The story revolves around the everyday life of three high-school girls who all have a kanji "葉" (literally "leaf") in their names, and have different features - hence the translation of the title, "three leaves, three colors".

== Characters ==
=== "Three leaves" ===
Yōko Nishikawa (西川 葉子, Nishikawa Yōko)
Voiced by: Yū Wakui (Japanese); Alexis Tipton (English)
A girl in the same grade but different class to Futaba and Teru. She was raised in a rich family, but before the story starts, her mother died and her father's enterprise went bankrupt; as a result, she has to lead a frugal and ordinary life on her own, while she still speaks and behaves with the demeanor of a noble girl, and still longs for her previous rich life but gradually adapts. She was very lonely since that misfortune, until Futaba and Teru run across her at the start of the story, and befriend her. Her given name means "leaf child".
Futaba Odagiri (小田切 双葉, Odagiri Futaba)
Voiced by: Mai Kanazawa (Japanese); Jeannie Tirado (English)
A cheerful and energetic girl featuring an extraordinary large appetite. She always wins the food challenges held by restaurants, so that many restaurants place her on blacklists; and actually she did this just for being adequately fed instead of getting the awards. She is not good at studying, but does well in cooking. Her given name literally means "double leaves".
Teru Hayama (葉山 照, Hayama Teru)
Voiced by: Ayaka Imamura (anime), Maya Yoshioka (Kirara Fantasia) (Japanese); Tabitha Ray (English)
The class representative of Futaba's class. She has a haraguroi personality, which means she acts nicely to other people while she is actually mean to them; Serina and Asako are always her victims. She is excellent in study, but does very poor in sports. She can't resist cute little animals. Her surname literally means "leaf" + "mountain". She has a cat named Beelzebub, which her sister claims that it was because the cat is surrounded by flies when they found it.

=== Other characters ===
Serina Nishiyama (西山 芹奈, Nishiyama Serina)
Voiced by: Machico (Japanese); Felecia Angelle (English)
Classmate of Futaba and Teru, and friend of Asako. She is exceeded by Teru in many aspects, such as the grading in study, and the competition for the position of class representative, thus she sees Teru as her main rival; but she always becomes a victim of Teru's haraguroi personality in their confrontations. She loves cute little animals, like Teru. Her cat is named Eternal because she wishes it to live a long life, as her previous cat has died.
Asako Kondō (近藤 亜紗子, Kondō Asako)
Voiced by: Aina Suzuki (Japanese); Dawn M. Bennett (English)
Classmate of Futaba and Teru, and friend of Serina. She is air-headed and always hurts other people unintentionally. Typically, she often tries to help Serina when the latter confronts Teru, but her efforts always hurts her friend instead.
Shino Sonobe (薗部 篠, Sonobe Shino)
Voiced by: Rika Momokawa (Japanese); Sarah Wiedenheft (English)
Former maid of Nishikawa family. After the bankrupt of Nishikawa's enterprise, she lost that job and starts a pâtisserie. She accepts Yōko as a part-timer to support Yōko's living. She is actually over 30 years old, but has the appearance of a teenager girl. She has the tendency to sneak into Yōko's wearing a high school girl uniform, to her dismay.
Mitsugu Yamaji (山路 充嗣, Yamaji Mitsugu)
Voiced by: Kenji Akabane (Japanese); Kyle Phillips (English)
Former manservant of Nishikawa family. After the bankrupt of Nishikawa's enterprise, he lost that job and has to make a living with multiple part-time jobs; nevertheless, he still tries his best to take care of Yōko.
Kō Hayama (葉山 光, Hayama Kō)
Voiced by: Asuka Nishi (Japanese); Bryn Apprill (English)
Teru's elder sister. In contrast to Teru, she features an angelic personality, although her innocent mind occasionally brings about unintentional hurts. She always makes foods that she claims to be good for health, but with terrible taste and smell.
Yū Takezono (竹園 優, Takezono Yū)
Voiced by: Haruka Watanabe (Japanese); Alison Viktorin (English)
The son of the rich Takezono family which had dealings with Nishikawa family. He regards Yōko as his fiancée even after Nishikawa's misfortune, and despite he is only a boy of ten years old or so.
Sakura Usuda (臼田 桜, Usuda Sakura)
Voiced by: Nao Natsuno (Japanese); Jill Harris (English)
Futaba's little cousin. Being a girl of only 11 years old, she has a life plan to her fifties involving becoming an idol and later a noblewoman. She is the classmate of Yū, and lists him as "the first backup of boyfriend", and behaves intimately with him when they meet, much to his annoyance. Despite thinking of becoming an idol, her singing is terrible.
Hajime Tsuji (辻 一芽, Tsuji Hajime)
Voiced by: Kotone Kuwayama (Japanese); Morgan Berry (English)
A high-school boy with the appearance of a middle-school student. He often participates in food challenges, like Futaba, but always loses to her, and thus hates her. Despite his appearance, he is one year older than Sasame, and quite popular in school as a mascot due to his cuteness.
Sasame Tsuji (辻 小芽, Tsuji Sasame)
Voiced by: Chiemi Tanaka (Japanese); Madeleine Morris (English)
Hajime's younger sister, and Yōko's classmate. She looks quite like her brother so that the "Three Leaves" once mistook they are twins. She tries to stop Futaba from participating the food challenges to avoid Hajime being annoyed, and fails; on the other hand, she admires Yōko and wants to befriend her. When she learns Futaba and Yōko are friends, she gets into a dilemma. She is Yōko's first friend among her classmates.
Kōsei Nishikawa (西川 孝清, Nishikawa Kōsei)

== Media ==
=== Manga ===
Sansha San'yō began as a Japanese manga series by Cherry Arai and was first published in Manga Time Kirara 's February 2003 issue. The manga was serialized at Manga Time Kirara, except between December 2003 to January 2007 when the manga was serialized at Manga Time Kirara Carat. The manga's chapters were compiled into fourteen tankōbon volumes.

No.	Release date	ISBN
1	June 28, 2004	4-8322-7511-9
2	March 28, 2005	4-8322-7531-3
3	November 28, 2005	4-8322-7552-6
4	August 28, 2006	4-8322-7589-5
5	September 27, 2007	978-4-8322-7651-2
6	October 27, 2008	978-4-8322-7742-7
7	August 27, 2009	978-4-8322-7834-9
8	October 27, 2010	978-4-8322-7953-7
9	February 27, 2012	978-4-8322-4114-5
10	May 27, 2013	978-4-8322-4301-9
11	August 27, 2014	978-4-8322-4472-6
12	March 26, 2016	978-4-8322-4676-8
13	July 27, 2017	978-4-8322-4854-0
14	January 25, 2019	978-4-8322-7060-2

=== Anime ===
Sansya Sanyou's logo for their anime adapatation.

A 12-episode anime television adaptation by Doga Kobo aired from April 11 to June 27, 2016 It is directed by Yasuhiro Kimura and written by Hidoaki Koyasu. Jun Yamazaki provided the series' character designs. Later it was confirmed that Crunchyroll was added the series alongside Time Travel Girl and Omamori Himari on their catalog since December 21, 2016.

The opening theme is Clover♣Kakumation クローバー♣かくめーしょん (Kurōbā♣Kakumēshon, Clover♣Revolution), and the ending theme is Gūchoki Parade (ぐーちょきパレード, Rock-Scissors-Paperade), both performed by Mai Kanazawa, Ayaka Imamura, and Yū Wakui under the name Triple♣Feeling.

In episode 12, the song School High Touch! (スクールはいたっち！, Sukūru Hai Tatchi!) is used as an insert song, which is also performed by Triple♣Feeling.

Later, in 2018, character designer Jun Yamazaki shared a question he received on Wednesday regarding the possibility of a second season of the anime. He then stated that he showed the question to animation producer Shōta Umehara, who then told Yamazaki that while producing a second season would be difficult, they might be able to make something different.

==== Episode list ====
Episode	Title	Original release date
1	"These Are Bread Crusts" "Pan no mimi desu wa" (パンの耳ですわ)	April 11, 2016
While on lunch break, Odagiri Futaba, who decides to take a shortcut to her classroom, and Hayama, who is chasing a cat, stumble upon Nishikawa Yoko eating alone. When Futaba asks Yoko what's on her hand, she immediately says that they are bread crusts. Then, the three of them end up having lunch together and introduce themselves. Futaba asks Yoko whether she has no friends, where she replies that Futaba is too direct in asking it. That night, Yoko tries to deep fry the break crusts. During the next day, Nishiyama Serina and Hayama has a fight because Hayama apparently badmouthed Kondo Asako, though in the end Serina cries due to Hayama's words. As Yoko, Futaba and Hayama eat lunch together, Yamaji appears out of nowhere, crying out of happiness since the arrogant Yoko "miraculously" made some friends. Later, Futaba asks Yoko to lend her a math textbook, though the latter points out she didn't bring it. During lunch, when Futaba points out that bread crusts don't have enough nutrient, Yoko pulls out a bottle of mayonnaise as an answer. A worried Yamaji appears out of nowhere (he apparently works part-time to refill the vending machine at the school), and gives Yoko clearance goods from his part-time jobs. When Yamaji appears again another time to give Yoko some foods, the three talk about their favourite foods. Hearing that Futaba likes white rice, Yoko tries to make onigiri, though she forgot to add anything else, and ends up making a rice-only onigiri. In return, Hayama brings them to a bathhouse due to the free tickets she obtained. Yoko tries to make the most of the free ticket, and ends up passing out due to be in the bath for too long.
2	"Nothing Good for You is Tasty" "Karada ni ii mono wa oishikunai mono desu yo" (カラダにいいものはおいしくないものですよ)	April 18, 2016
While lunch, Hayama offers Yoko her rolled egg, which the latter refuse. Futaba asks both of them being so polite to each other, and they should call each other by using nicknames. Suddenly, a cat appears out of nowhere, which makes Hayama shows her soft side for animals. She tells them that she has a pet cat named 'Beelzebub' at home, which she nicknamed 'Bel'. Later, when watching Hayama does her class rep work, Yoko asks her why would she do it (she has no interest in it at all), in which she replies that it will look good on her resume. Serina is frustrated because Hayama stands in her way each time, and points out that she is chosen as class rep just because she looks like one. Futaba denies it, and reveals that it is actually part of Hayama's plan all along. After watching Serina runs away after hearing Hayama's words, Yoko finally concludes that Hayama is actually devilish after all. In class, Yoko watches Hayama and Futaba's physical education class, where they need to run. Serina, who is in the same class, mocks Hayama for her low stamina and body figure, and gets mocked in return. When the three return from school, Hayama found three abandoned kitten, and they look for new owners for them. When they discuss about it in school, Kondo points out that Serina used to have a cat, and in the end, she adopts one of the cats. On a different day, Futaba insists on calling each other by nicknames. Both Futaba and Hayama suggests nicknames for Yoko, but there is nothing they agreed on. Yamaji then appears out of nowhere, and ask both of them to address Yoko as 'Yoko-sama' (literally Miss Yoko), which ends up as her nickname, to Yoko's embarrassment. When they want to pick a nickname for Hayama, Futaba asks for her first name (again and again), which she ignores completely. Only when her sister, Hayama Kou calls her 'Teru-chan', she finally gives up and tells that her first name is Teru. When they found out that Kou is Teru's older sister, Futaba and Yoko compares them to angel and demon respectively. When Kou gives them candies, Futaba instantly pass out right after eating it. On Sunday, Teru and Kou go shopping together. They meet Futaba, and Kou's shop objective instantly change from buying cookbook to buying groceries. There, they meet Yoko, who manages to buy a 500-gram mayonnaise for 98 yen from a flash sale. Having many raffle tickets, they try the raffle. While Futaba only gets tissues (5th prize), Yoko gets a coffee set (4th prize). Surprisingly, Teru gets Koshihikari Rice, the 3rd prize. Even more surprising, Kou sweeps all 1st to 3rd prize with her incredible luck. In the evening, Kou reveals that she actually wants to buy a photo album to store the photo from since they were little. She reveals that Teru always gets injuries from protecting her when they were little, which becomes her reason for cooking healthy food (despite the bad taste). On the next day, Kou made them onigiri as thanks for the previous day, with the addition of liver, white roe and bitter melon, which Yoko bravely eats. When Yamaji comes and asks her not to give Miss Yoko weird things to eat, Kou says that nothing good for them is tasty.
3	"A Taste of Maid" "Meido no aji ga shita" (メイドの味がした)	April 25, 2016
When Yoko goes to school, it is revealed that Yamaji always inspects whether she locked properly after she goes out. A week later, Futaba reveals that she is running out of money due to her accidentally use her allowance to eat the expensive grilled sea urchin. When Futaba decided she probably should work part-time, Yoko plans to do the same as well, while asking what should be a good place for her to work. Her two friends instantly imagine Yoko acting tsundere in a maid cafe. While Futaba suggests that they ask Yamaji, surprisingly he is nowhere to be found. They suddenly come across a flyer about a new cake shop named Secret Garden recruiting for workers. When they enter, there is no one around, so they look around. By looking and tracing the blood-colored spot on the floor, they thought that a murder happened, but it appears to just be a person accidentally spilled jam on the floor, and sleeping with her eyes open out of exhaustion. She introduces herself as Sonobe Shino, Nishikawa Family's former maid, now opening a cake shop with Yamaji's help. Similar to Yamaji, she is also surprised that Yoko made some commoner friends. When Yoko tells her desire of working, Sonobe instantly agrees and even ask her two friends to work as well. An angry Yamaji Mitsugu comes in and fights Sonobe in an attempt to disallow Yoko's employment, which is stopped by Yoko. When they return home, they come across a food challenge, which Futaba effortlessly finish, filling her stomach and even get extra money out of it. On a different day, Teru come across Futaba, who once again finishes another food challenge. They decide to go to Secret Garden and compliment the cake Sonobe gave them the other day, with Futaba claims that the cakes have a taste of maid. At Secret Garden, they found Yoko-sama in a butler outfit, surprising them (though their reasons are different). Yoko tells them that she is working there alongside Yamaji and Sonobe, and reveals that Sonobe is in her early thirties, despite her appearance. Yoko is dismissed early by Sonobe, so she walks home with Teru and Futaba. On the next day, Futaba and Teru found Sonobe in their school, wearing the appropriate school uniform (which she skillfully tailored). Sonobe watches as Yoko carry out her classes, and realize that Teru and Futaba is not in Yoko's class, despite them being friends. The three of them then eat lunch together with Sonobe. Pleased with what she saw, Sonobe returns home, while asking Futaba and Teru to take care of Yoko-sama. The next day, Yoko found Sonobe handing out flyers to students, to her annoyance.
4	"Actually, This Is What I Live For" "Mushiro ikigai desu" (むしろ生きがいです)	May 2, 2016
When Yoko-sama invited her friends to her home, they all play pretend to be a married woman, wife of a chairman and wife of a real estate magnate, as Yamaji tells Futaba and Teru a tale from Yoko's childhood. In Futaba's case, it is revealed that she has been a walking black hole since she was in primary school, eating a loaf of bread (with jam) for snacks. When they ask about Teru's past, she tells them that Santa didn't give her none of what she wanted back then (either a white tiger, a puma, a snow leopard or a sabre-toothed cat). Suspecting it is because she has been a bad girl, she vows to be a good girl and study hard, even though it is all just for show. Both Futaba and Sonobe are initially jealous of Teru who has a good older sister, but retract their statement after seeing her act in the present. Serina is frustrated to see Teru's cat Beelzebub's photo in a magazine, so she decides to take pictures of her cat as well, to no avail since she only has a smartphone camera. While Yoko says that she wants a pet as well, Futaba said she already has a dog, as Yamaji suddenly appears and ask her who does she mean by that statement. Futaba jokingly asks Yoko to throw a stick and asks Yamaji to fetch it, but he surprisingly does so, to their creep. The next day, the three talks about hobbies. When Futaba claims that her hobby is cooking, Teru and Yoko don't believe it, and instead mock her by saying that her hobby is eating cooked food. In the evening, Futaba and Teru accompany Yoko, who wants to try eating at a fast food restaurant. Yoko points out that Futaba likes to eat outside, which Futaba claims that eating out is what she lives for. There, Yoko reveals that her mother has died, and her father is working on "something big", and sending her allowance regularly. Outside, they meet with Takezono Yuu, who claims to be Yoko's promised prospect (fiancee), which Yoko denies, and tells them it is just a promise on the lips. Yuu meet with Yamaji soon afterwards, calling him a stalker. The next day, Futaba's cousin is visiting, so they go to meet her. She introduces herself as Usuda Sakura, and when Yoko claims her to be cute, she replies that she already knows about it. Sakura tells them that she has already planned for her life, while Yoko is reminded how life can be so cruel. Sakura considers Yamaji to be a future husband, seeing him as someone handsome, but cancels her intention after knowing that Yamaji is a stalker. They run into Yuu, who gives Yoko wagyu beef. A happy Sakura hugs Yuu-kun, surprising him, while revealing that they are both classmates, and Yuu-kun is her number one candidate to be her darling. The next day, Yoko tells them that she failed to cook the beef. Claiming that her hobby is cooking, Futaba helps her to cook the beef, as the three have dinner together at Yoko's house.
5	"Your Birthmarks Have Faded" "Mōkohan wa mō naindesu ne" (もうこはんはもうないんですね)	May 9, 2016
During a very hot day in summer, Futaba comes to Teru's house, shouting "Teru-chan, let's play!" until she comes out angry and points out that she should just ring the chime. After annoyed by hearing that Futaba just come to play Old Maid with her, Teru suggests that they go to somewhere cooler. In a restaurant named Jonafull, as the three friends sit down, Yoko-sama dozes off, and hit her head quite hard on the table. They learn that Yoko is exhausted from working. The next day, hearing that Yoko is exhausted and had injured her forehead, Sonobe asks Yoko to rest. A worried Yamaji starts screaming asking Yoko to see a doctor, which Futaba advises that he is the one who should see one. In the end, after hearing that both Futaba and Teru has nothing to do, Sonobe asks them to manage the shop for the day, in which they have no choice but to agree. Teru complaints that she has to wear a maid uniform (Sonobe's extra outfit) while Futaba wears a white shirt with black skirt. Sonobe replies by implying that she has no clothes with Futaba's size, since Futaba has a dynamite body figure. Futaba is shown to be an excellent worker, thanks to her vast knowledge about foods. Kou comes visiting the shop to see her sister works. When she wants to help as well, knowing that asking Kou to cook something is a bad omen, Sonobe asks her to name a new gelée, which she gives the name Buta Yurai (豚由来 Derived from Pig) because it has collagen, to her dismay. A worried Yuu comes running to see Yoko. Sonobe says that Yuu is kind, while pointing out that his birthmark has faded by looking directly under his clothes (as to imply that he has grown), to the latter's shock and horror. Teru and Yamaji realize that Yuu might just like older woman, when he obediently obey Kou's words. Kou then reveal another reason she came to Secret Garden; to give Yoko some food to get her better, to everyone's horror. Kondo Asako comes to Serina's house, shouting "Nishiyama!" and ringing the chime multiple times, before Serina comes out angry and points out that everyone in the house is named Nishiyama, and she shouldn't ring the chime too many times. Asako invites Serina to go to Secret Garden together. To Sonobe's annoyance, the name 'Buta Yurai' ended up to be the name of the new gelée. Unbelievably, Yoko claims that it was thanks to Kou's food that she is better, with the extra effect of she doesn't need to sleep last night. When Serina and Asako arrives, Serina is shocked to see Teru working there, in which both Serina and Teru having a psychological fight, with Asako trying to help, but ends up hurting Serina as usual. Sonobe asks Serina to work there as well, but Yamaji objects to it, once again fighting (literally) with Sonobe. The next day, Serina comes stalking Secret Garden. Caught red-handed by Sonobe, Serina is tricked into wearing a maid outfit (tailored by Sonobe the day before) and work there replacing Yoko to earn her money to buy the camera she wanted. Despite not working, Yoko, Teru and Futaba visit the shop, shocking Serina. As they are getting more and more customers, the three of them help managing the cake shop as well. Later on, when Serina is looking at cameras she want to buy, she encounters Sonobe, who is making printout of her face, which the latter claims to give it to Serina as memento, to her embarrassment.
6	"Veggies, Meat, Meat, Meat, Meat, Meat, Meat, and Fish" "Yasai niku niku niku niku niku niku sakana" (野菜肉肉肉肉肉肉魚)	May 16, 2016
During August, Yoko, Futaba and Teru arrive at the beach... not to play, but to work with Sonobe by managing her beach hut, Himitsu no Hanazono (秘密の花園, literally Secret Garden), Beach Hut Version. (Not) surprisingly, Yoko-sama don't know what a beach hut is, and Sonobe's attempt on explaining it to her end in failure. An overprotective Yamaji brings along a metal bat, with the intention of swinging it to anyone who stare at Yoko-sama. Futaba once again expertly shows her skill of attracting customers by eating the desserts herself. While handing out flyers to promote the shop, Yuu comes in a big boat, with the intention to help Yoko work... by buying one of each desserts and drinks listed in the menu. Yuu force himself to eat all of them under the pretense that Yoko is the one who made them, but Yamaji reveals that actually he is the one who made them. In the end, Yuu gets a stomachache. Sonobe states that she has prepared barbecue for everyone. To Yuu's dismay, Yamaji is the one who cooks the barbecue. The girls happily eat Yamaji's cooking, with Futaba orders a "Veggies-Meat-Meat-Meat-Meat-Meat-Meat-Fish" ratio of barbecue from Yamaji. Kou suddenly comes out of nowhere, claiming that she comes to help. When they tell her that the shop is closed, Kou instead grills barbecue and serve them to the sickly Yuu, with Yamaji informs that he will call an ambulance, just in case. Yoko, Futaba and Teru intend on playing on the beach after their work with Himitsu no Hanazono is over for the season, but due to a shark sighted on the ocean, they have no choice but to cancel it. Yuu comes by and hand them tickets to the hotel pool, and invites them to play over. To his horror, Usuda Sakura is there as well, even though it's just a coincidence. Happy that she found Yuu-kun, Sakura tackles him into the pool, which resulted in him being sent to the hospital (though according to Futaba, it's just mental damage). Unknown to them, Kou won the tickets to the pool from a raffle a while back, and gave it to Asako, who comes with Serina. At first, they try to ignore the three of them, but Futaba's act of training to catch abalone made Serina can't hold her temper any longer. Knowing that Teru is there, Serina runs off. Teru tries to finish her sandcastle, but Kou asks her to swim instead. Although everyone knows she can't swim, Teru can't escape her fate, and Kou forces her to train in the kiddie pool. Sonobe and Yamaji's arrival saves Teru from being forced, as they bring lunch. While Yoko-sama points out that both Sonobe and Yamaji are late, both of them imply that they actually hunt the shark sighted on the beach and cook it for lunch.
7	"Ten Yen Short" "Jū-en tarinai" (十円足りない)	May 23, 2016
Autumn has arrived, as Yoko, Futaba and Teru return home from school. Futaba only thinks about food, and says that it is an autumn of eating, while adding that she can eat five times as much in autumn. They meet with a blue-haired boy, who shouts "Odagiri Futaba!", and runs before anyone can say anything else. At Stuffed Hut (a restaurant), Yoko is mad because the boy they met earlier is being impolite. They wonder how would someone know Futaba's full name. In the food challenge, Futaba manages to eat (or rather, sucking using a straw) a huge bucket of Almond Jello under the given time, completing the challenge. They then realize that Futaba's full name is put on the board each time she finishes a food challenge. At school, Futaba and Teru meets a girl with the same look as the boy, who shouts "Odagiri Futaba!" as well before running away, confusing them. During lunch, they discuss whether the two persons are a similar person or not. When Yoko returns to her class with the intention of asking Yamaji to investigate it later, she meets the blue-haired girl, and realizes that she is actually her classmate, and asks the girl to meet her on the roof after school. After school, the girl is shown to look up to Yoko, and is surprised to see her coming with Odagiri Futaba and Teru. When Teru says her name is Tsuji Sasame, Yoko says that she doesn't know her name, since she hasn't talked to her classmates yet. Sasame is surprised when she knew that Yoko is friends with Futaba, and asks Futaba not to stand in her (older) brother's way anymore. Even more surprising, her brother is one year older than her, despite the sibling look like twins. Sasame tells them that her brother likes doing the food challenges, and will not stop before he can defeat Odagiri Futaba, even pushing himself too much. Futaba assures her that she will defeat her brother so bad so that he can fight no more, which makes Sasame cries and call Futaba an idiot before running away in tears. When both Yoko and Teru gives her a disappointed look, Futaba claims that she just wants to eat, and start pitying herself, which her friends deny. Futaba is banned from taking food challenges from restaurants besides Stuffed Hut due to her glutton, so she orders normally at Stuffed Hut this time, fear that she would be banned there as well, which is denied by the owner. She orders a large helping of curry with egg, corn, cheese, croquette, cutlet and sausage, and the older Tsuji appears out of nowhere, claiming that is far from normal size. He instantly orders the same thing as Futaba, and claims that he won't lose against her. Tsuji finishes eating faster than Futaba, as he look at her proudly. Futaba claims that she doesn't want to compete and just want to enjoy the food this time, so Tsuji pays his food and run away crying. A stalking Sasame claims that she won't forgive Futaba. As Futaba, Teru, Yoko and Kou returns home from school, suddenly Kou sense someone is stalking them. Yamaji appears out of nowhere, asking that maybe she sensed him, though she denies it. Suddenly they see a candy lying in the middle of the road. Far from stupid, Futaba easily know that it is a trap and drag the proprietor out, who is revealed to be Sasame. Sasame is surprised Futaba is not caught, as she claims that she catches her brother with the same tactic. Sasame reveals that she want to stop Futaba while not making Nishikawa Yoko hates her, which is exactly what she did. Shocked by the hatred, Sasame runs again, blaming Futaba. They tell Yoko that since Sasame is the first classmate she talks to, she should be nice to her, though Yamaji talks too much, angering Yoko-sama. At school, Serina is annoyed that both Futaba and Teru are talking loudly when she reads. Futaba reveals that the book is actually a shoujo detective manga, "Come Forth☆Murder Incident!!" (おいでませ☆殺人事件!! Oidemase☆Satsujin Jiken!!), and says that the book doesn't suit her. Serina claims that she borrows it from Asako, which she agrees, though Asako says that Serina is the fan of the manga from primary school, despite Asako is the one who buys majority of them. Teru laughs at Serina's book of choice, which makes her running away from class, crying. Futaba notes that she has seen a lot of the same scene recently. Yoko stumbles upon Sasame while walking. A scared Sasame hit upon a pillar, which starts a chain reaction, and falls down. Seeing her coins scattered, Yoko, now values money more than ever, helps Sasame picks her coins. Sasame claims that she is ten yen short, and a panicked Yoko starts looking for it. Thankfully, Teru arrives, and lends Sasame the ten yen she needs. Later, Sasame comes to class 1-3 to return the ten yen she borrows. Hearing that Yoko works at Secret Garden, Sasame goes there, stalking. Getting caught red-handed by Yoko and friends, Sasame ends up eating cake with them. Sonobe tells Yoko-sama that she is glad Yoko-sama made another friend. A happy Yamaji says it is a miracle, and expresses his happiness that people can make friends even without money, and Sonobe is happy to be surrounded by another high school girl, and express her relief that Yoko becomes poor, to Yoko's annoyance. The next day, both Yoko and Sasame pair up in physical education class, as Teru and Futaba watch happily.
8	"You've Got Them Hooked" "Takusan tsuretemasu" (たくさん釣れてます)	May 30, 2016
In a Cat Cafe named "Nekonimashi" (猫にまし), Serina is playing with the cats there happily. Suddenly, a new customer enters, and Teru sits besides Serina. Both of them are surprised to see each other there. The story then flashbacks to that morning. Kou asks Teru to go out with her, and when she points to Nekonimashi, Teru reveals that she has a coupon to there already, which is the reason of Serina's encounter with Teru. Kou asks Serina the name of the cat she adopted back in episode 3, and when she says that the cat's name is Eternal (or El for short), Teru laughs and claims that Serina just used the dictionary, which the latter can't refute, due to the fact is true after all. Teru then tells them the name of the cats at the cafe, "Konohanasakuya-hime" (called Kono-chan), "Lakshmi" (called Mi-chan), "(Apu-Kon-Tiki)-Viracocha" and "Teutates". While Serina says that the names are good, Teru points out that those names will be used at vet or in public, embarrassing the owners. Serina takes out her DSLR camera and start taking pictures of the cats, as Teru watches in envy (she didn't bring hers). During lunch, Futaba expresses her surprise that Serina goes to cat cafes, and gives Teru a ticket to the petting zoo, Petting Animal Town (ふれあい動物タウン Fureai Doubutsu Taun). While the ticket is for two people, Futaba says that she can't go (she doesn't like animals so much), while Yoko-sama has work, so they suggest that Teru goes with Serina, to her dismay. On Sunday, despite both of them dislike each other, Serina goes with Teru to Animal Town. Worried, Asako and Futaba tails them. Though they try to split up, Serina's and Hayama's planned route in the zoo is exactly the same, making them meeting each other no matter where they go. At the Cat Room section, Nishiyama praises Serina for getting all the cats hooked to her. With her rivalry mode on, Serina replies by start mocking Teru. Seeing that Teru is not angry as she usually be (she tries to practice self-discipline), Serina digs her own grave by mocking her in full throttle, until Teru snaps, which makes Serina runs home crying, cutting her trip for only half a day. When Teru tells her experiences the next day, Futaba concludes that Teru and Serina will never get along. At Stuffed Hut, Futaba finishes her food challenge of eating Mega Ogre Omelette Rice, while saying that Teru and Serina should get along due to they like the same things, which Teru refers that Futaba and the older Tsuji can't get along even though they like foods. Tsuji fails the food challenge, as he shouts at Futaba that he'll remember the lost and run away. At school, Futaba plays an air-guitar with the broom and invites Teru, Yoko, Asako and Serina to form a band, as it is the autumn of arts. Kou suddenly appears and start sings "Rivers of Three Currents" (三つ瀬川 Mittsu Segawa), and Miss Yoko suddenly faints and gets flashbacks of her life. Just before she crosses the river herself, Futaba and teru wakes her up. When they critic her song for being grim, Kou points out she sings it without thinking, and points out that even Serina sings for Eternal. When Asako asks (more like pressing) Serina to sing it, she gets super mad. On the next day, they see that Kondo Asako is alone, as Serina doesn't come to school. She ends up spending time with the three leaves group. They learn that Asako has been friends with Serina since primary school. Kondo keeps complimenting and belittling them one after another, which makes Futaba suspects that she is plain insensitive. Yoko thought that Asako has a fight with Serina, but after Asako buys cake for Serina, they explain to Yoko that she has everything wrong from the start, as Serina is actually sick, to Yoko's embarrassment. At home, Serina is frustrated that Asako didn't reply her mails after lunch, and as Eternal the cat comforts her, she sings her a song. Unknown to her, the other four girls are already outside the door to her room, as they awkwardly wait and listen for her to finish her song.
9	"Curry Tastes Better on the Second Day" "Karē wa futsuka-me" (カレーは二日目)	June 6, 2016
It is the time for Cultural Festival. Class 1-3 students are thinking of an event to do, and Futaba suggests curry shop. When they ask about costumes, Sonobe Shino appears out of nowhere and suggests that they just use school uniforms, and make the theme to be "ordinary curry made by high school girls", before disappearing without anyone else but Asako, Serina, Futaba and Teru notices her real identity. During lunch, Yoko tells them that she is going to be a zombie, as Class 1-2 is doing a haunted house. Futaba is shown to be scared of ghosts. Serina takes care of the preparation for the curry shop, while Futaba takes care of the preparation for the curry. At Stuffed House, for the first time, Futaba fails the food challenge, as the curry happens to be too spicy. Though, the owner reveals that Sonobe Shino the ex-maid is able to finish the curry, Futaba comments that her taste sense might have died (since she makes sweet foods every day). The older Tsuji sibling laughs at Futaba, though seconds later, he is also shown to not be able to eat the curry. In the end, both Futaba and Tsuji takes the curry that they couldn't finish back to their home. The next day, Futaba brings the curry (alongside the restaurant's pot) to school, and claims that she can tone down the spiciness. Teru complains that it is yesterday's curry, and Futaba replies that curry tastes better on the second day. Futaba suggests they cook by using real curry spices, but Teru claims they have no budget, so they have to go with curry roux instead. Later, Yoko asks Teru on how to be a zombie. Teru suggests on asking Tsuji Sasame, but her cuteness hogs attention from all of her classmates. Asako hears about Yoko's problem, and suggests that they visit Hanako-san to learn about how ghosts act, and a scared Futaba refuses to follow. Yoko is very eager to see Hanako-san, and when asked about what she wanted to do if she got dragged by Hanako-san, Yoko replies that she will give her educational guidance, to Futaba's shock. Left alone, and as she is standing besides a haunted house, Futaba screams in fright when Serina calls out to her, while rudely calling her a high school ghost who has been in second place for a thousand years. At Secret Garden, Yoko tells her former servants about her role at the school festival, and asking on advices. Yoko then remembers that she snuck to school again, and punishes her by asking her to sit in seiza. During cultural festival, Futaba once again expertly attract customers with her eating skills. Not wanting her to eat everything, Futaba is asked to advertise outside, where she fans the aroma of curry to potential customers, which results in success. Out of nowhere, a bunch of people start running towards the direction of their class. Realizing that they are not running to get curry, both Futaba and Teru takes a look at the source. An expertly acted zombie with a very realistic makeup (later known made by Sonobe Shino) named Nishikawa Yoko had apparently scared everyone, including Teru and Futaba, who points out the face already has a mosaic (censored due to goreness in a non R-18 anime). Yoko ends up wearing an eyepatch in order to hide the creepiness. Futaba ends up entering the haunted house, and expertly advertise it as well with her realistic scream (partly due to Yoko's scary face), and Sasame's attempt on scaring Futaba ends up in her being scared as well by Yoko. As Sonobe walks through the cultural festival, she ends up at Kou's stall for some reason, to Sonobe's despair. Kou tricks her to buy the green vegetables (青汁 aojiru) juice. Kou gives her another three glasses for her to bring to the three leaves. Even though she is an ex-maid, distracted by some kids, she falls down and spills the green-colored drink. Sasame mocks Futaba for being scared to ghosts and try to scare her, but Futaba pats her head instead due to her cuteness. Yamaji appears and warns them as "the remnant of what used to be a student" (aka Sonobe) comes bringing two green vegetables juice, resulting in they run away from her. On the field, Usuda Sakura sings with a very terrible voice, as Yuu-kun is forced to stand at the stage with her. As class 1-2 curry is sold out (partly Futaba's fault), Yoko single-handedly scares away all customers (and staffs) by opening her eyepatch. At the end of the festival, the three leaves return home, and both Teru and Futaba forbid Yoko from returning home without taking off the cosmetics.
10	"A Day to Gorge on Chicken and Cake" "Toriniku to kēki o tabe makuru hi" (鶏肉とケーキを食べまくる日)	June 13, 2016
It's almost Christmas season. Yoko claims that it is the season for her heating bill to be high, since it is cold. Yamaji, who happens to be passing flyers, hearing that Yoko is going to cut cost by being in a blanket, says that he will buy a heater for Yoko-sama. The three leaves ignore him and walk away. Futaba claims that Christmas is the day to gorge on chicken and cake, though the others disagree. Futaba suggests that they throw a Christmas Party. Futaba and Yoko walks to school, as Futaba says that she'll be in charge of the cake. A spying Kou then interrupts the conversation, while telling them a secret: Christmas Day is also Teru's birthday. Both Futaba and Yoko act awkwardly after that, which is easily detected by Teru. They felt ironic that the devil (aka Hayama Teru) was born on a holy day like christmas. Futaba suggests to Yoko that they throw a surprise birthday party disguised as a christmas party, and keep it as a secret. Sonobe once again sneak into school to pass out Christmas cake flyers, angering Yoko. Sonobe does her best to praise Yoko-sama about her work at Secret Garden with carefully placed words. Sonobe tells them that Yoko can have a holiday from work that day. A curious Hayama Teru suddenly appears, but Sonobe manages to bluff her and keep the party a secret. Nishiyama Serina happily buys Christmas gift for her cat Eternal, and suddenly feels down when she knows that Teru's birthday is on Christmas. Asako founds Serina sitting besides a vending machine, who now has zero intention to celebrate Christmas at all. As Teru goes for the party, her sister Kou gives her a stew she cooked overnight, which Yoko bravely eat as usual. At school, Teru adds salt to the wound by happily states that her birthday is on Christmas to Serina, while the latter ask her to apologize to Christmas. Yoko, Yamaji and Sonobe shovel away snow in front of Secret Garden. An overprotective Yamaji accuses Sonobe of making the snow fall, to her amusement. Futaba comes to Secret Garden, and instead of buying the white/snow-colored cake, she buys dark-brown chocolate cake instead. Kou asks Teru to come out and play in snow, which the latter refuse. As Kou shows Teru the snow hut she made, the snow hut collapse on Teru. Kou gives a mail to Futaba, saying that Kou is trapped in an avalanche in the backyard. Odagiri Futaba comes to Teru's house, while shouting "Teru-chan! Let's play!" repeatedly until the freezing Teru comes out in anger and ask her to ring the chime. The three leaves are discussing about plans for New Year, and Sonobe suggests a pajama party. Yoko, who knows nothing about pajama party, is shocked that relaxing in bed and talking while in pajama is considered a party by commoners. To Sonobe's disappointment, the party lack giggles and squeals. Sonobe tries to film the pajama party (by spying secretly), and Yamaji drags the former maid away. The next day, Yoko and Teru greets each other a Happy New Year, while Futaba cooks them breakfast. Futaba suggests that they pound mochi, surprisingly, by using a mochi pounder machine instead of using traditional way.
11	"A Day to Gorge on Chocolate" "Choko o tabe makuru hi" (チョコを食べまくる日)	June 20, 2016
It's almost the season for Valentine's Day. Yoko claims that it is the season that she want winter to end so that she can save on heating bills. Teru points out that they seems to have this conversation before. Futaba claims that Valentine Day is the day to gorge on chocolate, while Yoko disagrees, and Teru once again feel a déjà vu. Futaba tells Yoko that she can give chocolate to thank people. During lunch, Yoko tells that Yamaji helps her rescue a cat on a three on the other day (thanks to Yamaji's sixth sense that feel that Yoko needs help). Futaba assures her that the cat will repay her good deed somehow. Teru calls out to Yamaji, who instantly appear... and ask him to take a picture of the cat if it appears again, to his confusion. Beelzebub the cat wakes Teru up, thanks her for sheltering it, and gives Teru a present... in her nightmare. When she wakes up, Bel brings her a worm as a thanks (maybe). At school, Serina disagrees that Teru is a model pet owner, and in the end, fights with her to take a cuter picture of their cat. As Asako, Futaba and Yoko judge the pictures, they found it too similar to be compared. Teru and Serina agrees that is should be a tie. As they talk about competition, the older of the Tsuji siblings come challenging Futaba, and Futaba challenge him to eat Jumbo Hamburg at the nearby restaurant in return. She forgot that she is banned from the shop, so Futaba lost without even getting to compete. As Yoko congratulates him, he forgot her name, and an irritated Yamaji suddenly appears, asking him to call her "-sama", to Yoko's dismay. Tsuji comes home happy that he beat Futaba, though his sister Sasame denies his winning. At Cherry Burger, Sakura asks the three leaves for advice on the chocolate she wants to give to Yuu-kun. Teru suggests that she bind him with a scarf embedded with wires and force-feed the drugged chocolate, to Sakura's delight. Yamaji is happy about Sakura's plan when Yoko tells him (since both Yamaji and Yuu dislike each other). When Yoko says that she wants to make chocolate as well, Yamaji pretends to be deaf, while Sonobe thought that she means for Secret Garden's business, as Yoko denies it and says that she wants to thank everyone with handmade chocolate. Knowing that Yoko-sama will overwork herself, Sonobe asks Serina to work at Secret Garden on Valentine Day, alongside Futaba, Teru and Yoko (who luckily didn't get sick). Not wanting to wear Sonobe's maid uniform, Sonobe made Teru a new maid uniform to wear. Exhausted, Sonobe sleeps while standing with her eyes open. The Tsuji siblings come to buy Gâteau Chocolate, to Futaba's surprise. The older Tsuji says that he gets a lot of chocolate during Valentine, unexpectedly. Futaba suspects it is just because of his cuteness. In the evening, Kondo Asako comes to Secret Garden, as Sonobe finally wakes up. Sonobe instantly asks Asako to work there, with Asako refusing directly. Sonobe thanks them for working so good that she can sleep throughout the whole ordeal, with an angry Yoko asks her to sit in seiza. On Valentine's Day, Futaba speaks out loud in class that Serina wears a maid uniform, to her shock, as Serina amusingly reply in a tsundere tone. Teru's attempt on honestly praising her embarrasses Serina, so she runs away. During lunch, Yoko thanks Teru and Futaba for their help, and gives them handmade truffle (aka burned charcoal), which Futaba bravely eat. Luckily it is edible, despite not melting. Yoko gives Sasame, Yamaji, Kou, Asako, Serina and her father the same truffle, though Sonobe feels sad that she got nothing (which means that Yoko is not thankful to her at all).
12	"I Am Graduating from Bread Crusts" "Mou pan'nomimi wa sotsugyō shimasu wa" (もうパンの耳は卒業しますわ)	June 27, 2016
Yoko goes to school, as Odagiri Futaba greets her with "Yoko-san" (and wears a green katyusha), which Yoko feels very weird. Teru lazily greets them as well (and she doesn't wear any spectacles), and Futaba calls her "Teru-san" (too polite of a namecall), as Yoko feels weird and weirder. Yoko thought that it was all an act, as Futaba points out that Yoko is acting weird. Yoko sees both Futaba and Teru talk about girlish things in class. Serina is now a class representative (with spectacles), and is a very shy and meek person. Yoko concludes that this is all a (terrible) dream, and realizes that Serina is just pretending to be meek, and have the real Hayama Teru's haraguroi personality. Kondo Asako is now a very strict person who lectures people, which makes Yoko realizes that they are not so different after all. During lunch, Yoko awkwardly eat with the other two. Teru feels like ditching class due to being so lazy, and Futaba eats too little (aka just a normal lunch). Yoko feels curious about other people's personality in this world. Kou has become the top delinquent of the school, though she keeps her always smiling face and always comes to school. Yamaji is now a schoolteacher (with spectacles), and asks Nishikawa to properly address her teacher. Feeling that Yamaji is being rude to her, she instinctively slaps Yamaji on the face, to her own surprise, and start acting high and mighty like an ojou-sama. Sonobe Shino is also a teacher with a well-developed body..... as Sonobe Shino tells the three leaves about the dream she saw last night. Yoko claims that of course it is Sonobe's dream, as she would never slap a teacher. The three leaves discuss on how fun it is to be a different self, as Usuda Sakura calls out to them while wearing a girly outfit in an attempt to change her image. Sakura wants them to listen to her singing, which happens to be very terrible (with a setting exactly like Giant from Doraemon sings). They ask her to sing with putting a bucket on, and Sakura feels like throwing up hearing her own singing, which Futaba accurately tsukkomi that thankfully they have a bucket. During lunch, Yoko tries new hairstyles. When Yoko style her hair as twin braids (with spectacles on), she wonders if she should cut her hair, and Yamaji suddenly appears out of nowhere to reject the proposal. Yoko claims that long hair uses a lot of shampoo and water, so it is expensive, which Yamaji can't refute at all. Futaba claims that Yoko's original hairstyle is the best for her, and hime cut is a must for an ojou-sama, though Yoko is a former one. At Secret Garden, Yoko claims to be a pro at working part-time, with Yamaji and Sonobe praise her, as Futaba watching awkwardly. Suddenly, two customers come by, with one of them being Nishikawa's old (ojou-sama) friend, Osakabe, who is her former schoolmate from Mannenro Girls Academy. When Osakabe's friend asks about Yoko working, Yoko tells her that she is a former ojou-sama, and work for the income. Futaba is moved to tears while claiming that Yoko-sama is pro at her work. Osakabe gives her number to Yoko if she needs to contact her. After they leave, Yoko instantly collapses from the shock. Although she claims that she has leveled up, she is still shocked, and try to drink mayonnaise, to Futaba's horror. The next day, when Yoko walks with Teru, Futaba comes to school wearing a red ribbon and acting exactly like in Sonobe's dream. The story flashbacks to Futaba's house, where Sakura claims that Futaba has not enough feminine charm, which is the reason she acts girly. When Futaba sees two crows cawing to each other and states that the birds are having a little chat, Teru's skin goes polka dot (as a sign of disgust). In class, when Asako offers Futaba some sweets, she refuses politely, to Asako and Serina's horror, and instantly ask if she is sick. Serina states that the sweets are burnt milk caramels, and Futaba still refuses, despite being drooling. Serina tells Futaba the tips to girliness, as Asako replies that Serina is doing so much (without any bad intention). In the evening, Futaba states that her lucky colour is yellow and her lucky number is three from the fortune-telling corner on her phone. The older Tsuji pass by, and ask Futaba whether she is not going to Stuffed Hut, as the new food challenge is apparently three kilograms of curry (yellow in colour). Despite the fortune, Futaba refuses and says that as a girl, she couldn't finish three kilos of food. Tsuji replies that those words are rude to those who had lost to her, as Futaba returns to become her former self. She finishes the challenge easily (winning against Tsuji), as Teru states she has zero feminine charms. Kou comes running and give Futaba a green-colored juice to increase her feminine charm, to everyone's horror. On the next day, the juice appears to be effective, as it made their skin smoother. Yuu states that his father has a job for Yoko's father. When Yoko wants to thank him, Yuu asks her to sign the marriage application, and Sakura appears out of nowhere, stating that she can do that anytime, while dragging him away. At school, Yoko-sama states that her father is now a normal employee, and states that she won't be captivated by foods anymore. She instantly betrays her words seconds later when Sasame gives her dietary supplement cookies (10 packs of 4 sticks) as return gift for Valentine's Day. Yoko states disappointingly she hasn't change from when she met Teru and Futaba, in which the other two disagree, and states that Yoko is endangered species that must be protected (she didn't realize they are talking about her though). Futaba also states that Asako is an endangered species. A rare beast (aka Sonobe) once again wearing high school girl uniform, as Yamaji chases her. The three leaves encounter a poisonous animal (aka Kou), and they run from her towards their usual lunch place. In the epilogue, Yoko states that she is graduating from bread crusts instant food, to her friends delight. Though, she prepares the food wrongly, and sulks when Futaba points it out. In the end, she still eats bread crusts for lunch.

=== Video game ===
Characters from the series appear alongside other Manga Time Kirara characters in the 2019 mobile RPG, Kirara Fantasia.

== See also ==
- Engaged to the Unidentified, another manga series by Cherry Arai
