= Aikatsu! The Movie =

2014 film by Yuichiro Yano

- Theatrical release poster
- Japanese: 劇場版 アイカツ！
- Revised Hepburn: Gekijōban Aikatsu!
- Directed by: Ryūichi Kimura (Note: Credited as Chief Director (総監督, Sō Kantoku)); Yuichiro Yano
- Screenplay by: Yōichi Katō
- Based on: Aikatsu! by Sunrise and Bandai
- Starring: Sumire Morohoshi; Azusa Tadokoro; Ayaka Ōhashi; Shino Shimoji; Asami Seto; Kiyono Yasuno; Yūna Mimura; Ayumi Fujimura; Minako Kotobuki
- Cinematography: Yōichi Oogami
- Edited by: Yoshihiro Kasahara
- Music by: monaca
- Production company: Sunrise
- Distributed by: Toei Company, Ltd.
- Release date: December 13, 2014
- Running time: 89 minutes
- Country: Japan
- Language: Japanese
- Box office: US$834,831

Aikatsu! The Movie (Japanese: 劇場版 アイカツ！, Hepburn: Gekijōban Aikatsu!) is a 2014 Japanese animated musical film directed by Yuichiro Yano, with Ryūichi Kimura as chief director and written by Yōichi Katō; the film is based on an anime television series with a same name by Hajime Yatate and Bandai. Produced by Sunrise and distributed by Toei Company, it focuses on Ichigo Hoshimiya and her friends preparing for "Ichigo Hoshimiya Super Live" event. The film stars the voices of Sumire Morohoshi, Azusa Tadokoro, Ayaka Ōhashi, Shino Shimoji, Asami Seto, Kiyono Yasuno, Yūna Mimura, Ayumi Fujimura, and Minako Kotobuki. It was released in Japan on December 13, 2014.

== Plot ==
After performance at a live concert goes successful, the school headmistress, Orihime, asks Ichigo and her friends backstage to hold a special live event: "Ichigo Hoshimiya Super Live". After the press conference, Akari decides that she wants to help Ichigo and the others for the event. Ichigo asks Naoto to write a song for her, but declines and suggests Kanon, a local singer and songwriter. Kanon agrees, and briefly bonds with the girls with a supreme strawberry parfait.

Later that night, Ichigo receives a message from Mizuki to meet her at a stadium, who surprisingly tells her that she'll stop being an idol. While disappointed, the girls continue to plan the event with help from others. As the three are practicing, Kanon comes and tells them that the song is ready. As Ichigo realizes that the song shouldn't be just for the fans, she hopes that it'll convince Mizuki to continue being an idol.

During the performance, Ichigo's crystal mic gets stolen by Stylish Thief Swallowtail, which Shion helps it get it back in time. While Kaede, Sakura and Yurika manage to get the premium cards back in time, Akari also brings Mizuki in time, after searching for her in 14 places. During Ichigo's performance, Akari tells Mizuki to join the performance, but she asks Akari to join with her. After the event, Mizuki tells Ichigo that she'll continue being an idol, and as a thank you gift, Ichigo gives Akari her crystal mic.

== Voice cast ==
- Sumire Morohoshi as Ichigo Hoshimiya
- Azusa Tadokoro as Aoi Kiriya
- Ayaka Ohashi as Ran Shibuki
- Shino Shimoji as Akari Ōzora
- Minako Kotobuki as Mizuki Kanazaki
- Tomoyo Kurosawa as Otome Arisugawa
- Asami Seto as Shion Kamiya, Raichi Hoshimiya
- Kiyono Yasuno as Sakura Kitaōji
- Manami Munakura as Yurika Todo
- Yuna Mimura as Kaede Ichinose
- Yū Wakui as Sumire Hikami
- Yui Ishikawa as Hinaki Shinjō
- Kaori Ishihara as Seira Otoshiro
- Akina as Kii Saegusa
- Minami Takahashi as Sora Kazesawa
- Misako Tomioka as Maria Himesato
- Aya Suzaki as Mikuru Natsuki
- Atsushi Tamaru as Tsubasa Sena
- Toshiyuki Toyonaga as Naoto Suzukawa
- Ayumi Fujimura as Kanon
- Kaya Matsutani as Headmistress Orihime Mitsuishi
- Makoto Yasumura as Johnny Bepp
- Aya Endō as Tiara Yumesaki

== Production ==
In February 2014, it was announced that a first film for the Aikatsu! series was in development, with an original story focusing on the main three characters: Ichigo, Aoi and Ran.

== Release ==
The film was released in theaters in Japan on December 13, 2014.

== Reception ==
=== Box office ===
The film opened at number 5 out of top 10 in the Japanese box office in its opening weekend, and ranked number 1 on viewer satisfaction ratings on its first day.
