= Sabagebu! =

Japanese manga series

- Sabagebu! -Survival Game Club!-
- Cover of the first volume featuring Momoka Sonokawa (right) and Miou Ootori (left)

さばげぶっ!
- Genre: Comedy, slice of life, sports (Airsoft)
- Manga
- Written by: Hidekichi Matsumoto
- Published by: Kodansha
- Magazine: Nakayoshi
- Original run: December 1, 2010 – December 1, 2016
- Volumes: 13
- Anime television series
- Directed by: Masahiko Ohta
- Produced by: Yūko Kato; Shūichi Fujieda; Masato Takami; Yōhei Kisara; Hiroki Kitayoshi; Takayuki Tabata; Atsushi Aitani
- Written by: Takashi Aoshima
- Music by: Yasuhiro Misawa
- Studio: Pierrot+
- Licensed by: NA: Sentai Filmworks
- Original network: Tokyo MX, Sun TV, BS11, KBS, AT-X, Anime Network
- Original run: July 6, 2014 – September 21, 2014
- Episodes: 12 + 6 OVA

Sabagebu! -Survival Game Club!- (さばげぶっ!) is a Japanese manga series written and illustrated by Hidekichi Matsumoto, began serialization in Kodansha's shojo manga magazine Nakayoshi from December 2010. The final chapter was published in the magazine's January 2017 issue. An anime adaptation by Pierrot+ aired in Japan between July and September 2014.

== Plot ==
Taking place at Aogiri Academy, the series follows a group of female high school students and their daily lives in a survival game club.

== Characters ==
=== Survival Game Club (aka Gesukawa Girls) ===
Momoka Sonokawa (園川 モモカ, Sonokawa Momoka)
Voiced by: Ayaka Ōhashi
A transfer student who is coerced into joining the Survival Game Club by Miou. Gentle and kind on the surface, a different aspect appears when she feels herself wronged or threatened, showing a vicious and vengeful side. She uses a Beretta 92FS.
Miou Ootori (鳳 美煌, Ōtori Miō)
Voiced by: Yumi Uchiyama
The club president and a third year student who comes from a rich family. Her beauty and personality makes her well respected and loved by most of the students in the school. Due to being held back in school for a year (attributed to a lack of credits in the manga and misconduct in the anime), she is old enough to wield airsoft guns the other members are too young to use. She dual wields two Desert Eagles.
Maya Kyōdō (経堂 麻耶, Kyōdō Maya)
Voiced by: Lynn
A second year student who works part time as a gravure idol. A running joke is the fact that out of all the members of the team, she is usually the first one eliminated. She uses an M4A1 Carbine with a Close Quarters Battle Receiver and an XPS variant of an EOTech holographic sight which she keeps in a case as opposed to holsters like the rest of the club.
Urara Kasugano (春日野 うらら, Kasugano Urara)
Voiced by: Rumi Ōkubo
A first year student who hides a fearsome aura behind her cute demeanor. Initially doting on Miou, she falls in love with Momoka instead after developing a masochistic taste for her violent punishments. She dual wields two Glock 26C (note that while the semi-auto Glock 26 is a real firearm, the 26C is a full auto, airsoft exclusive variant, which is manufactured by the companies KWA, KSC, and WE-Tech).
Kayo Gōtokuji (豪徳寺 かよ, Gōtokuji Kayo)
Voiced by: Nao Tōyama
A first year student in Momoka's class and the club's treasurer, who joined purely because of cosplay (as airsoft is partly about appearances). She is shown to be able to change clothing incredibly quick and often wears ridiculous ghillies. She is a genius with an IQ of 160, and is consistently one of the top students in her class. She dual wields two Mac-11s.

=== Other characters ===
Platy (カモ, Kamo)
A platypus who is the club's mascot and often hangs around at Momoka's house.
Kazue Sonokawa (園川 かず江, Sonokawa Kazue)
Voiced by: Kikuko Inoue
Momoka's mother, who has some dubious fetishes. She is shown to carry a Smith & Wesson Model 500 with an Aimpoint T1 red dot sight and is the most skilled gunfighter in the series.
Ena Sakura (佐倉 恵那, Sakura Ena)
Voiced by: Yui Horie
The Survival Game Club's advisor, who often brings about bad luck wherever she goes.
Yayoi Isurugi (石動 やよい, Isurugi Yayoi)
Voiced by: Eriko Matsui
The student council president who is often bewildered by Miou's antics, though appears to be developing a crush on her.
Fried Chicken Lemon (からあげ☆レモン, Kara'age Remon)
Voiced by: Souta Arai
An overweight otaku who becomes an admirer of Momoka and occasionally gets involved in the groups antics.

== Media ==
=== Manga ===
The series, written by Hidekichi Matsumoto, was serialized in Kodansha's Nakayoshi magazine from December 2010 to December 2016 and compiled in thirteen tankōbon volumes.

=== Anime ===
An anime adaptation by Pierrot+, directed by Masahiko Ōta and written by Takashi Aoshima, aired in Japan between July 6, 2014, and September 21, 2014, and was simulcast by Crunchyroll. A pre-airing of the first episode was streamed on Niconico on June 28, 2014. Each Blu-ray Disc volume includes an original video animation episode. The opening theme is "YES!!" by Ayaka Ōhashi, whilst the ending theme is "Pitty Patty Survibird" (ぴてぃぱてぃサバイバード, Piti Pati Sabaibādo) by Gesukawa Girls (Ayaka Ōhashi, Yumi Uchiyama, Rumi Ōkubo, Lynn, and Nao Tōyama). The anime has been licensed by Sentai Filmworks.

==== Episode list ====
No.	Title	Original release date
1	"Joining the Club!" "Nyūbu!" (入部!)	July 6, 2014
On her way to the first day at her new high school, Momoka Sonokawa encounters a strange woman who brings a pair of guns out at a train molester, only to get arrested herself for possessing firearms. Momoka spots the same woman at her school and follows her to a dilapidated building, where she ends up being caught by the school's Survival Game Club. Noticing Momoka appears to have a talent for airsoft, the woman, club president Miou Ootori, attempts to recruit her into joining the club, but Momoka flat out refuses. The next day, Momoka finds herself bullied by her classmates over how close she appeared to be to Miou, but Miou helps sort things out. However, Miou's kindess turns out to be a trick as she drugs Momoka and uses her unconscious body to hand in the recruitment form for joining the club. During the weekend, Miou and fellow club members: Maya Kyōdō, Urara Kasugano, and Kayo Gōtokushi take Momoka to an airsoft shop to get her some equipment. After picking out a gun for Momoka, Miou partners up with her for a practice match against the other members, with Momoka's natural talent winning against the opposing team.
2	"Twin Tail Trap" "Tsuintēru no Wana" (ツインテールのワナ)	July 13, 2014
Urara, who seeks to get rid of anyone standing between her and Miou, attempts to dispose of Momoka, only for her plan to backfire when Momoka's fear of praying mantis' lands her in the group's favor. Momoka gets her revenge, only for Urara to develop a masochistic side and latch onto her. Later, Maya asks the other to help her train how to eat natto for a commercial shoot, receiving harsh training from Momoka, who is jealous of her breasts, resulting in her developing an acute fear of natto. Afterwards, Momoka spends time with the silent Kayo, who seems to change her cosplay whenever she isn't looking. The two soon engage in a survival game, which the other members soon join, after which Kayo reveals she just wanted to have a conversation about cosplay.
3	"She's Coming! The Woman Who Summons Storms Appears!!" "Yatsu ga Kuru! Arashi o Yobu On'na Tōjō!!" (ヤツが来る！嵐を呼ぶ女登場!!)	July 20, 2014
Momoka meets the Survival Game Club's advisor, Sakura, who often finds herself in a string of unfortunate incidents. Sakura tasks the club with removing a hornet's nest, with proves more dangerous than expected due to Sakura's involvement. Later, Momoka faces up against the Chino Elementary School Survival Game Club after their representative, Roselia Haguro, insults her, finding Roselia to be a tougher opponent than she thought. Miou soon shows up and changes the rules, with the winner decided by whoever can retrieve the club mascot, Platy, from a crow.
4	"Boy Meets Girl of Destiny (lol)" "Unmei kakko warai no Bōi Mītsu Gāru www" (運命(笑)のボーイミーツガールwww)	July 27, 2014
Momoko competes in a light gun game against one of its top ranked players, a fat otaku named Karaage Lemon, with an embarrassing punishment should she lose. Later, Momoka ends up gaining a large amount of weight and ends up going to extreme lengths in order to lose it. Afterwards, Momoka tries to find out the true nature behind Platy, before winding up in a battle against her mother.
5	"Ascension!? Silent Survival" "Shōten!? Shizukanaru Sabaibaru" (昇天!?しずかなるサバイバル)	August 3, 2014
Miou takes the girls to a temple to practice meditation, where she almost becomes tempted to follow the way of the Buddha. Later, Urara finds herself stuck on the side of the school building after inadvertently breaking the toilet, valuing her dignity over her safe rescue. Afterwards, as Momoka discovers a priceless antique gun, her desire to auction it resulting in a battle between the heavenly and devilish sides of her conscience.
6	"Revenge of Yayoi Isurugi, Student Council President!" "Seito Kaichō Isurugi Yayoi no Fukushū!" (生徒会長石動やよいの復讐！)	August 10, 2014
Student Council President Yayoi Isurugi, fed up with Miou making a fool of her at club meetings, attempts to destroy the Survival Game Club by swaying over its members to her side, but doesn't have much success. She then attempts to defeat Miou herself by constantly serving her food she doesn't like, though this only leads to some dubious rumors. Later, Sakura brings an executive chair to the clubroom, prompting the club members, who had just watched a yakuza movie, to compete over who gets to sit in it.
7	"The Hunting Club!" "Shuryō-bu!" (しゅりょうぶ！)	August 17, 2014
Coming across a village that is constantly plagued by animals eating their crops, the girls aim to get hunting licenses in order to help the village with their crisis, only to find they are too young. Later, the girls dress themselves up as men, with Momoka taking advantage of her manly look to become popular with the girls, learning a harsh lesson in the process. Afterwards, the girls go on a search for a suspicious person roaming the school grounds targeting the club members.
8	"Pure White Defence Force" "Junpaku Bōei-sen" (純白防衛線)	August 24, 2014
Momoka accepts Maya's offer to do a photoshoot for money, but runs into trouble when an infamous trio of perverted camera otaku use every technique they can to get a picture of her panties. With the help of the creepy Karage Lemon, she just might be able to escape. Afterwards, the Survival Club of "The Immaculate and Pure Ladies Academy" challenges the protagonists to a 5-on-5 battle in the mountains. Maya very quickly finds herself the only surviving member of the team when it turns out all of the opponents set up the match to act out their fantasies on her.
9	"Tale of the Doggypus" "Inu Kamo Monogatari" (犬かも物語)	August 31, 2014
Momoka attempts to pass Platy off as a well-trained dog in order to enter a swanky dog café. Meanwhile, Maya, Urara, and Kayo end up getting locked in the school pool, which is believed to be haunted, putting them in a life or death situation. Later, the girls go to Australia to participate in a survival game race against a team of elderly but skilled players.
10	"Treasure Hunter" "Torejā Hantā" (トレジャーハンター)	September 7, 2014
Momoka finds a treasure map she had drawn when she was a kid, so the group go to her hometown to search for treasure. Later, the girls try to help out an idol named Yammy, who has gained an incredible amount of weight after being heartbroken. Afterwards, the girls find themselves being hunted by a mysterious being during a jungle exercise.
11	"Gaudy Decoration" "Gotegote Deko" (ゴテゴテデコ)	September 14, 2014
While on an errand to get Miou's gun fixed, she visits a decal shop to get her phone decorated, but due to some misunderstanding from the cashier accidentally gets Mio's gun decorated instead. Later, Momoka learns how to walk in high heels from Lemon in order to impress a rich old man and get a cash reward. Afterwards, Miou brings in a high quality crab, who becomes determined not to become dinner, prompting a battle between the survival game club and Platy, who tries to protect the crab.
12	"Farewell, Friends! The Last Day of the Survival Game Club!" "Saraba Tomoyo! Sabage-bu Saigo no Hi!" (さらば友よ！サバゲ部最後の日！)	September 21, 2014
When Momoka appears to have caught an unknown virus, the others vow to protect her from becoming a medical test subject, coming up against the National Survival Game Club. After an intense battle filled with many sacrifices, Momoka prepares to give herself up, only to learn they have found a simple cure. Later, at Christmas, the group attempts to plan a surprise birthday party for Urara, whose birthday is on Christmas Day, but nothing seems to go according to plan.

==== OVA episodes ====
No.	Title	Original release date
OVA1	"And Then Someone Was Gone" "Soshite Dareka Inakunatta" (そして誰かいなくなった)	September 24, 2014
The club go to the countryside for a training camp, where they come up against a gruelling obstacle course.
OVA2	"Saba Shorts!" "Sabayon!" (さばよんっ！)	October 29, 2014
The girls decide to try play some April's Fool pranks on Miou while Momoka tries various drinks to keep her awake in class.
OVA3	"Nobody In That Room Ever Learns" "Heya no Naka no Korinai Hitobito" (部屋の中の懲りない人々)	November 21, 2014
The club has a surprise sleepover in Momoka's room, much to Momoka's dismay.
OVA4	"Student Council President Yayoi Isurugi's Counterattack!" "Seito-kaichō Isurugi Yayoi no Gyakushū!" (生徒会長石動やよいの逆襲!)	December 25, 2014
Facing a lot of bad luck, Yayoi tries to rub some of it off on Miou, with no such luck.
OVA5	"Return of the Saba Shorts" "Modottekita Sabayon!" (戻ってきたさばよんっ!)	January 28, 2015
Momoka takes an interest in everyone's lunches before everyone gets together for a flower viewing party.
OVA6	"King's Game!" "Ōsama Gēmu!" (王様ゲームっ!)	February 20, 2015
The girls play the King's Game, resulting in assorted hijinks.
