= The Idolmaster Shiny Colors =

Simulation video game by Bandai Namco

- Anime key visual

アイドルマスター シャイニーカラーズ (Aidorumasutā Shainī Karāzu)
- Video game
- Developer: Bandai Namco Nexus
- Publisher: Bandai Namco Entertainment
- Genre: Life simulation
- Platform: Browser, iOS, Android
- Released: Browser; April 24, 2018; iOS, Android; March 13, 2019
- Manga
- Written by: Akira Shinozaki
- Published by: Kadokawa Shoten
- Magazine: Comic Newtype
- Original run: July 23, 2019 – August 26, 2022
- Volumes: 5
- Video game

The Idolmaster Shiny Colors: Song for Prism
- Developer: Bandai Namco Studios
- Publisher: Bandai Namco Entertainment
- Genre: Life simulation, Rhythm
- Engine: Unity
- Platform: iOS, Android, Windows (DMM Games)
- Released: November 14, 2023
- Anime television series
- Directed by: Mankyū; Takeshi Iwata (S2)
- Written by: Yoichi Kato
- Music by: Yasuhiro Misawa
- Studio: Polygon Pictures
- Licensed by: Crunchyroll (streaming); SEA: Plus Media Networks Asia
- Original network: TV Tokyo, BS11, AT-X, BS Nittele
- Original run: April 6, 2024 – December 21, 2024
- Episodes: 24
- icon

The Idolmaster Shiny Colors (Note: Japanese: アイドルマスター シャイニーカラーズ, Hepburn: Aidorumasutā Shainī Karāzu; stylized as THE iDOLM@STER SHINY COLORS) is a Japanese life simulation video game developed by Bandai Namco Nexus and published by Bandai Namco Entertainment. A spin-off of The Idolmaster franchise, it started as a browser game that launched in April 2018, and was later released as a mobile game for iOS and Android in March 2019. A manga adaptation was serialized on Kadokawa Shoten's Comic Newtype website from July 2019 to August 2022. An anime television series adaptation produced by Polygon Pictures aired from April to June 2024. A second season aired from October to December 2024.

== Overview ==
The series follows the female idols and the producer and staff of 283 Production (283プロダクション, Tsubasa Purodakushon) and their activities as idols, including concerts, events, and stage productions. There are a total of 28 idols in 283 Pro as of 2024, grouped into 8 units. Each of these units comes with a unique gameplay trait, for example, illumination STARS uses two stats for their appeal strength instead of just one.

== Development and release ==
The browser game, which uses HTML5, was announced during a presentation in February 2018. It launched on the browser game platform Enza on April 24, 2018, reaching over 800,000 pre-registrations ahead of its release. A mobile game version was released on iOS and Android on March 13, 2019.

A new mobile game for iOS and Android, titled The Idolmaster Shiny Colors: Song for Prism, (Note: Japanese: アイドルマスター シャイニーカラーズ Song for Prism, Hepburn: Aidorumasutā Shainī Karāzu Songu fō Purizumu; stylized as THE iDOLM@STER SHINY COLORS Song for Prism) was announced in April 2023. A demo version was released to testers from May 19 to 23. The game was released on iOS, Android, and Windows via DMM Games on November 14, 2023.

== Related media ==
=== Radio show ===
The Idolmaster Shiny Colors: Habataki Radio Station, an Internet radio show featuring voice actors from the game, premiered on Bandai Namco's Asobi Store service on June 14, 2018. Bonus content, titled Habataki After Radio Station (originally Kyūkeishitsu), are released for premium members of the service.

=== Manga ===
A four-panel manga series by Gimmy began serialization on the game's website and Twitter account in February 2018. It is published in print under the title The Idolmaster Shiny Colors: Shinymas Everyday!, with five tankōbon volumes released as of December 2025.

A manga adaptation by Akira Shinozaki was serialized on Kadokawa Shoten's Comic Newtype website from July 23, 2019, to August 26, 2022. It has been collected into five tankōbon volumes, published from March 2020 to December 2022.

A third manga series by Hiroki Ohara, titled The Idolmaster Shiny Colors: Coherent Light, began serialization on Comic Newtype on September 26, 2023, and focuses on the idol unit Straylight. As of December 2025, four tankōbon volumes have been released.

The Idolmaster Shiny Colors: Jimuteki Shinography, a fourth series by Gūtarō Yorude that focuses on character Hazuki Nanakusa, began serialization on Shogakukan's Sunday Webry service on October 21, 2023. As of April 2025, three tankōbon volumes have been released.

=== Anime ===
An anime television series adaptation was announced on March 19, 2023. It is produced by Polygon Pictures and directed by Mankyū, with Yoichi Kato writing the scripts, and Takeshi Iwata serving as assistant director, as well as CG director along with Susumu Sugai. Ryōhei Fukushi is designing the characters for animation, and Yasuhiro Misawa is composing the music. The 12-episode series was screened in Japan in three parts; the first on October 27, 2023; the second on November 24, 2023; and the third on January 5, 2024. It later aired on TV Tokyo from April 6 to June 22, 2024. (Note: TV Tokyo lists the series premiere at 25:28 JST on April 5, 2024, which is effectively 1:28 a.m. on April 6.) The opening theme song is titled "Tsubasa Gravity" (ツバサグラビティ).

A 12-episode second season was announced during "The Idolmaster Shiny Colors 6th Live Tour Come and Unite! Brilliant Bloom" concert on March 3, 2024. Like the first season, it was screened in Japan as three films, which premiered on July 5, August 23, and September 20, 2024. It later aired on television from October 5 to December 21, 2024. (Note: TV Tokyo lists the season premiere at 25:23 JST on October 4, 2024, which is effectively 1:23 a.m. on October 5.) Takeshi Iwata co-directed the season along with Mankyū. The opening theme song is titled "Prism Flare" (プリズムフレア). Crunchyroll is streaming both seasons. Aniplus Asia aired the series in Southeast Asia as a simulcast.

==== Episodes ====
===== Season 1 =====
No.	Title	Directed by (Note: Information is taken from the ending credits of each episode.)	Written by	Storyboarded by	Original release date
1	"A Single Feather in a Sky for One"; Transliteration: "Hitoribun no Sora, Ichimai no Hane" (Japanese: 一人分の空、一枚の羽)	Takeshi Iwata	Yoichi Kato	Ryō Ogawa & Takeshi Iwata	April 6, 2024
The newly formed idol agency 283 Production begins hiring new idols under the direction of the Producer, who organizes them into the groups L'Antica, ALSTROEMERIA, and Houkago Climax Girls. 283 Productions president Tsutomu Amai instructs the Producer to have all of the idols ready for the upcoming Wonder Idol Nova Grand Prix (WING) event. However, two of their idols, Meguru Hachimiya and Hiori Kazano, are yet to be assigned to a unit. While wondering how to organize Meguru and Hiori into a unit, the Producer comes across Mano Sakuragi in a park and is impressed with her singing voice. He offers to recruit her into 283 Production, and while she initially refuses, Mano is intrigued by the Producer's promise to show her a "new world" and she ultimately accepts. The Producer introduces Mano to Meguru and Hiori and organizes them into 283 Pro's fourth unit, illumination STARS. He then informs them they only have 3 months to prepare for WING.
2	"The Flames Called Song"; Transliteration: "Uta to Iu Honō" (Japanese: ウタという炎)	Takeshi Iwata	Yoichi Kato	Ryō Ogawa & Yuki Tamada	April 13, 2024
Kogane Tsukioka suggests to her fellow members of L'Antica: Mamimi Tanaka, Sakuya Shirase, Yuika Mitsumine, and Kiriko Yūkoku that they should make a music video to show off what L'Antica is. The Producer lets them know that he has managed to secure the award-winning director Katsuhiro Takamiya to work on their music video, but they need to come up with an idea of what it will be about. Meanwhile, the Houkago Climax Girls try to promote themselves by endorsing a local business that sells horse meat sausages while ALSTROEMERIA takes publicity photos. L'Antica decides to make their music video, titled "Babel City Grace", tell a story about girls trying to understand each other through song. While Takamiya is tough on them at first, his directing style is able to draw out their acting talent. However, their biggest challenge is to film the final scene outside a castle, but a storm suddenly hits. Not content to let filming end prematurely, Kogane convinces L'Antica to perform outside in spite of the bad weather. The filming ends up being a success, and the Producer concludes that L'Antica's "color" is "Igniting fires with songs".
3	"Hopes for the Future"; Transliteration: "Mirai e no Akogare" (Japanese: 未来への憧れ)	Takeshi Iwata	Yoichi Kato	Ryō Ogawa & Mankyū	April 20, 2024
The Producer meets the members of ALSTROEMERIA, twin sisters Amana and Tenka Osaki and Chiyuki Kuwayama, and advises them to focus on a specific vision for their group to move forward. Meanwhile, L'Antica's music video becomes a big hit, earning the group many new fans and firing them up for their upcoming performance at WING. That night, Amana, Tenka, and Chiyuki reflect on what exactly their hopes for the future are. The next day, illumination STARS continues their training, and Mano is inspired to work harder to follow Hiori and Meguru's examples. The Producer then assigns ALSTROEMERIA to host the Spring Flower Festival, and the members agree to focus on becoming better idols. As the Houkago Climax Girls continue to try to promote themselves by running a lottery booth, ALSTROEMERIA takes the stage at the Spring Flower Festival. However, as they host the events, they notice a young brother and sister in the audience not getting along. Amana decides to intervene and helps the siblings make up. Tenka makes the observation that the siblings' smiles were like blooming flowers, which inspires Amana to make ALSTROEMERIA's focus on "making smiles bloom".
4	"Real Heroes!"; Transliteration: "Hontō no Hīrō!" (Japanese: 本当のヒーロー！)	Susumu Sugai & Takeshi Iwata (Note: Live Part Director (ライブパート演出))	Yoichi Kato	Kōji	April 27, 2024
The Producer announces to the Houkago Climax Girls, consisting of Kaho Komiya, Chiyoko Sonoda, Juri Saijō, Rinze Morino, and Natsuha Arisugawa, that they will be performing in a hero show. Kaho is excited, believing that they will be performing for her favorite hero group, Justice V, until the Producer clarifies that the show will be with a local hero group called Pastel Nice, instead. Meanwhile, ALSTROEMERIA begins hosting their own livestream show while L'Antica continues promoting their music video. Illumination STARS continues their training, with Hiori recommending that Mano practice by herself. She notices Mano struggling to keep up in the dance choreography. On the day of the hero show, the Houkago Climax Girls are shocked to learn that due to a scheduling error, Pastel Nice are actually at a different event and cannot attend. The girls suggest that they take Pastel Nice's place and stage their own hero instead, which the Producer and the show staff agree to. The hero proves to be a huge success, with the girls performing their signature song "Yumesaki After School". Afterwards, the girls declare that they will befriend everybody in the world on their way to becoming the top idols.
5	"Our Very Own Formation"; Transliteration: "Sannin Dake no Fōmēshon" (Japanese: 3人だけのフォーメーション)	Takeshi Iwata	Yoichi Kato	Ryō Ogawa & Mankyū	May 4, 2024
As the Houkago Climax Girls, ALSTROEMERIA, and L'Antica continue promoting themselves, the Producer informs illumination STARS that their debut concert will occur in one month. While Mano and Meguru are excited, Hiori begins to feel anxiety as she fears that she isn't good enough yet and is falling behind Mano and Meguru as their skills improve. This causes her to push herself in her training, which causes the Producer to grow concerned about her. He arranges for all three girls to train together again, where Hiori finally admits her fears of Mano and Meguru hating her, as well as not being good enough to keep up with them. Mano and Meguru forgive Hiori and promise that all three of them will become idols. illumination STARS then spend the next month training and preparing for their debut concert, but they still are unable to completely perfect their formation by the eve of the debut concert. The girls then go to the park, where they reflect on and talk about their desire to become idols, inspiring each other to continue. On the day of the festival, the girls decide to go ahead with their formation and perform their debut song "Hikari no destination" which proves to be a huge success.
6	"Everything We Have Now"; Transliteration: "Ima no Subete o" (Japanese: 今のすべてを)	Susumu Sugai	Yoichi Kato	Masahiro Takata	May 11, 2024
With all of the 283 Pro idols ready, the Producer enrolls all of them into WING. In order to help their improvement and development, the Producer also asks the idols to film themselves during their training. Meanwhile, the Producer also approaches the WING staff and suggests that they film and air a documentary focusing on all of the 283 Pro idols preparing for WING, which they agree to. All of the idols spend the next month rigorously training and preparing for Wing up until the final day, where illumination STARS takes the stage. In the meantime, the Producer and the rest of the 283 Pro staff are shown working hard behind the scenes to support their idols.
7	"Road to W.I.N.G."; Transliteration: "W.I.N.G. e no Kiseki" (Japanese: W.I.N.G.への軌跡)	Takeshi Iwata	Yoichi Kato	Ryō Ogawa, Mankyū & Takeshi Iwata	May 18, 2024
After the conclusion of WING, the documentary "Road to WING" covering the 283 Pro idols airs on TV with all of the 283 Pro watching. During the airing, the idols from all four groups reflect on their performances in WING, and despite none of them managing to win the competition, all of them decide to keep working hard to improve themselves. Meanwhile, the 283 Pro idols' performance at WING has increased their fame, with the Producer noting that their schedules are now full with requests for appearances on various shows and events. However, he continues to think about how to take his idols to the next stage. Later, he gathers all the idols together and announces that he is preparing for all four groups to perform together in 283 Pro's first live concert, which excites everyone.
8	"Shining Upon Each Other"; Transliteration: "Terashiau Keshiki" (Japanese: 照らしあう景色)	Susumu Sugai	Yoichi Kato	Ryō Ogawa & Takeshi Iwata	May 25, 2024
The Producer informs the idols that at the 283 Pro First Live concert, they will be performing a new song called "Tsubasa Gravity" and advises that they all practice the song together. However, the Producer is concerned that the idols will have difficulty practicing together since all of their schedules are different. ALSTROEMERIA and the Houkago Climax Girls practice the new song together and then go on a radio show, with both groups learning new things from each other. Mano and Meguru help Hiori practice for her upcoming role as police chief for the day. The members of L'Antica attend various interviews. At the end of the day, all of the idols gather together for the concert's kickoff party and celebrate. After the party, the Producer approaches Mano in private and informs her that he wants her to be the center of the new song.
9	"The First Source of Courage"; Transliteration: "Saisho no Yūki" (Japanese: 最初の勇気)	Takeshi Iwata	Yoichi Kato	Ryō Ogawa & Takeshi Iwata	June 1, 2024
Mano is uncertain that she is qualified to be the center, but Meguru and Hiori promise to support her. They then attend a practice session with L'Antica and are impressed by how each of the individual members is able to split up to take on solo work. Illumination STARS and L'Antica then meet back up in the evening for a recording session for "Tsubasa Gravity". Mano sings the song first, which inspires everybody else to try their best. Later that night, the Producer meets with Mano privately again, and she informs him that she is willing to accept the position of center. All of the idols then continue practicing for and promoting the 1st Live, when the Producer gathers them all together and reveals that he has just finished a brand new song called "Spread the Wings!!". He distributes the lyrics to the idols and informs them that, despite the short amount of time left before the 1st Live, he is willing to include the new song in the concert if they agree to it. Inspired by the lyrics, Mano endorses the song, which leads to the idols unanimously agreeing to include it in the concert. The idols then spend the rest of the night practicing the new song together.
10	"Like a Rainbow of Colors"; Transliteration: "Irotoridori no Imēji" (Japanese: 色とりどりのイメージ)	Susumu Sugai	Yoichi Kato	Ryō Ogawa & Takeshi Iwata	June 8, 2024
The idols all attend a two-day training camp, which will be their last opportunity to be able to practice together to perfect "Spread the Wings!!". On the first day, they manage to memorize the choreography of the song, but their instructor reminds them that they need to have fun while performing as well, otherwise they won't be able to convey their feelings to the audience. That night, Mano heads outside to stargaze and wonders if she really is cut out to be the center. On the second day, Mano takes the lead in the practice session as the idols train to sing and dance "Spread the Wings!!" at the same time. On the second night, all of the idols head outside to stargaze together, and they imagine what the concert will be like. The Producer then provides them with fireworks to play with, and, watching the idols enjoying themselves, decides on the name "Shiny Colors" for the whole group. After the conclusion of the training camp, the Producer brings the idols to the stage they will be performing on.
11	"Passing the Baton"; Transliteration: "Baton o Tsunaide" (Japanese: バトンをつないで)	Takeshi Iwata & Hironobu Mochizuki	Yoichi Kato	Ryō Ogawa & Takeshi Iwata	June 15, 2024
On the day of the 283 Pro 1st Live, all of the idols prepare for their performances. As fans gather in the arena hall, illumination STARS, ALOSTREMERIA, Houkago Climax Girls, and L'Antica all perform their signature songs. Once all four groups have completed their performances, they prepare for the 1st Live's finale with Mano taking her place as the center.
12	"Spread the Wings!!"	Susumu Sugai & Takeshi Iwata	Yoichi Kato	Ryō Ogawa & Takeshi Iwata	June 22, 2024
The idols start off the final with their performance of "Tsubasa Gravity", with all of them recalling the memories of how they became idols and making it to this stage. After the conclusion of the song, the audience requests an encore. The idols return to the stage, and ALSTROEMERIA, Houkago Climax Girls, L'Antica, and illumination STARS each make heartfelt speeches to the audience, thanking them for their support. They then perform "Spread the Wings!!" The concert proves to be a huge success, and Shiny Colors continue their idol activities afterwards. To celebrate the success of their 1st Live, the idols have a picnic together in the park as they look forward to the future.

===== Season 2 =====
No.	Title	Directed by	Written by	Storyboarded by	Original release date
1	"The One Who Decides Where to Fly"; Transliteration: "Tondeku Saki o Kimeru no wa" (Japanese: 飛んでく先を決めるのは)	Takeshi Iwata & Kenta Sakama	Yoichi Kato	Ryō Ogawa, Chisaki Satō & Takeshi Iwata	October 5, 2024
In the wake of the successful 1st Live, the 283 Pro idols all experience a surge of popularity. The Producer then tells them he is organizing a second, Halloween-themed live event that both the idols and the audience can participate in. He also reveals that a new unit he has been training, Straylight, will be joining the agency. While heading to her next job, Mano encounters one of the Straylight members, Asahi Serizawa. Asahi asks Maho what kind of idol she wants to be, but Maho finds herself struggling with how to answer. On the night of Straylight's debut, Asahi takes the stage on top of a tower along with her teammates Mei Izumi and Fuyuko Mayuzumi. They then perform their debut song as the rest of the 283 Pro idols watch.
2	"Straylight.run() // Playback"	Susumu Sugai	Yoichi Kato	Ryō Ogawa & Takeshi Iwata	October 12, 2024
Prior to Straylight's debut, the Producer starts recruiting the idols he needs. First is Fuyuko, who is obsessed with putting on a cute act in public for maximum appeal. However, she is frustrated when she is paired with Asahi, who she feels is not a good match due to her energetic nature. Mei then joins the unit, and the Producers shows them their upcoming schedule leading up to their debut. While most of the schedule is practice sessions, there is also an audition for a popular music show. As the idols practice to determine who will be the group's center, the Producer asks Fuyuko why she insists on putting up her cute act in front of Asahi and Mei, but she claims she is showing her true self. After practice, the Producer decides to appoint Asahi as the center, much to Fuyuko's frustration. At the audition, Fuyuko overhears that another group has already been selected to win due to their connections. Regardless of this, Asahi tries to ad lib her performance but still fails to be selected. Asahi apologizes to the group, but Fuyuko finally breaks character and encourages Asahi to continue being the center. They then prepare to go to their debut.
3	"A New Light Through Unity"; Transliteration: "Mazari Aeba Atarashii Hikari" (Japanese: 混ざりあえば新しい光)	Susumu Sugai	Yoichi Kato	Ryō Ogawa & Takeshi Iwata	October 19, 2024
With their debut complete, Straylight formally joins the other idol units of 283 Pro. The Producer then announces that for the Halloween event, he plans to have the idols perform in shuffled teams so they won't be performing in their traditional units. Mano is teamed with Fuyuko, Kiriko, Chiyoko, and Chiyuki. Hiori is teamed with Asahi, Kogane, and Natsuha. Meguru is teamed with Yuika, Kaho, Juri, and Amana. Sakuya, Mamimi, Mei, and Tenka form the final team. The idols all begin brainstorming exactly how they want to perform at the Halloween event, and come up with the concept of surprising and then making the audience happy. Mano's group decides to hand out candy to the audience as part of their performance, and Mano confides to Chiyoko and Chiyuki that she's unsure of what kind of idol she wants to be. Chiyoko and Chiyuki admit that they also have the same thoughts, but conclude that they need to find the answers within themselves. Later, the Producer distributes each group's new songs. Mano's team works on their costume design, Hiori struggles to keep up with the team's dancing, Meguru's team decides to use large balloons as pumpkin props, and Sakuya's team thinks up lyrics for their song. In order to maintain surprise, each of the groups keep their preparation secret from the others until the day of the Halloween event.
4	"Happy Surprise Trick!"	Susumu Sugai & Kenta Sakama	Yoichi Kato	Hiroshi Chida	October 26, 2024
283 Pro's Halloween concert begins, and all of the shuffled teams perform their respective songs. However, right before the final performance, 283 Pro makes two surprise announcements: the release of 283 Pro's first album featuring all of the idol groups as well as their first national tour. Both the idols and audience are pleasantly surprised by these announcements, and the 283 Pro idols perform the concert's final song. After the concert, the idols celebrate their success, and Mano feels that she has gotten much closer to the audience now. The Producer thanks the idols for their hard work and prepares to inform them of a new announcement as four girls wait nearby.
5	"When We Said 'Let's Go,' It Was Already Decided"; Transliteration: "Ikō tte Ittara, Sore wa Mō" (Japanese: 行こうって言ったら、それはもう)	Takeshi Iwata & Kenta Sakama	Yoichi Kato	Ryō Ogawa & Takeshi Iwata	November 2, 2024
Prior to the Halloween concert, the Producer was already assembling a new idol unit called Noctchill, consisting of childhood friends Madoka Higuchi, Toru Asakura, Koito Fukumaru, and Hinana Ichikawa. While Toru is the main star of the group, Madoka only joined to protect Toru and distrusts the Producer, believing he seeks to take advantage of her. They begin training for their live debut on an entertainment tv show, though Koito remains nervous that she is not ready. After arriving at the tv station for their debut, the idols are disheartened to hear that the director plans to have them lip sync rather than sing live, have all the attention focused on Toru, leaving Koito believing her poor performance is at fault. Regardless, Toru insists they demonstrate their "bonds of friendship". During the performance, Toru, Madoka, and Hinana refuse to lip sync or sing in solidarity for Koito. Afterwards, Madoka wonders what direction Noctchill is headed.
6	"Beyond the True Feelings"; Transliteration: "Honto no Kimochi no Sono Saki ni" (Japanese: ほんとの気持ちのその先に)	Takeshi Iwata	Yoichi Kato	Ryō Ogawa & Takeshi Iwata	November 9, 2024
With the success of the Halloween concert, the Producer advises all of the idols that they should come up with an idea for the song they want to sing for their upcoming album. All of the idol groups begin brainstorming on exactly what kind of song that they are looking for. Mano tells her friends that she wants to recreate the feeling she had at the Halloween concert, bringing happiness to the audience in a unique way. Meanwhile, Noctchill still does not know what direction to go as a group, and the Producer has trouble securing jobs for them due to their botched live debut. The Producer then meets with Noctchill, asking if they are committed to becoming idols or not. Later, Mano encounters Toru at the office, and the two have a talk, with Mano telling Toru she wants to work hard to become an idol because she found something that makes her happy, which Toru seems to take to heart. Afterwards, she encourages her friends to commit to continuing on as idols, and the Producer officially adds them to the album list.
7	"The Most Important Thing"; Transliteration: "Ichiban Daiji na Mono" (Japanese: 一番大事なもの)	Susumu Sugai	Yoichi Kato	Ryō Ogawa & Takeshi Iwata	November 16, 2024
L'Antica attempts to brainstorm their new song, but their busy schedules make it difficult for them arrange a time where all of them are free. Sakuya, Kogane, and Mamimi are able to get together to brainstorm some ideas together. While Sakuya assures everybody she is fine, Yuika begins to suspect she is hiding something, but Sakuya brushes off her concerns every time she asks. Sakuya, meanwhile, feels that her friends are focusing on their solo events and no longer care as much about L'Antica as she does, triggering her childhood memories of her father often being too busy at work to spend time with her. She eventually confides to the Producer that she is okay with the thought of disbanding L'Antica, as all of the members will be able to do fine on her own, but Mamimi overhears and tells the rest of the group. The rest of L'Antica confront Sakuya, and she admits her feelings of insecurity, but they all assure her that they are still committed to L'Antica as it is their "home". L'Antica then commits to spending time together to finalize their song.
8	"Alstroemeria Is..."; Transliteration: "Arusutoromeria, Nante" (Japanese: アルストロメリア、なんて)	Takeshi Iwata	Yoichi Kato	Ryō Ogawa & Takeshi Iwata	November 23, 2024
Amana begins preparing for an audition to be featured in a magazine called "Apricot", which evokes nostalgic feelings in Chiyuki as she is a big fan of that magazine. While Chiyuki supports Amana auditioning for Apricot, she still feels conflicted since she has dreamed about appearing in the magazine as well, but is uncomfortable with the idea of competing against Amana. Meanwhile, Tenka arrives at the Producer's office to give him a gift, only to overhear that Amana has already been chosen for Apricot despite the auditions not taking place yet. Eventually, Chiyuki works up the courage to tell Amana and Tenka that she intends to audition for Apricot as well. However, Amana fears that she and Chiyuki directly competing against each other could risk breaking up ALSTROEMERIA, so she offers to withdraw from the audition, prompting Chiyuki to offer to withdraw instead. The Producer then finally reveals Amana has already been selected by Apricot and advises Amana and Chiyuki to reflect on what they truly want. ALSTROEMERIA end up meeting by the riverbank, and seeing that all three of them are unable to express what they truly feel, Chiyuki suggests they all yell out the opposite of what they truly feel. After expressing their feelings, they all realize they value their friendship and ALSTROEMERIA above all else and reconcile. Afterwards, Amana ends up being featured on the cover of Apricot, with Chiyuki and Tenka celebrating her success.
9	"One Resolution for the Two of Me"; Transliteration: "Uchi to Atashi no Hitotsu no Ketsuron" (Japanese: うちとあたしのひとつの結論)	Susumu Sugai	Yoichi Kato	Ryō Ogawa & Takeshi Iwata	November 30, 2024
As Straylight's fame grows, Mei is left wondering how to handle her appearance on stage. Early on, as a way to hide her stage fright, Mei put up a cool and mysterious front on the Producer's suggestion. Mei's image as a cool and mysterious idol subsequently made her very popular, but as Mei has become more comfortable performing on stage, she begins having the desire to show her more carefree personality on stage. However, she fears that going against her established image will hurt Straylight's popularity. Fuyuko tries to give Mei some encouragement to show her true self on stage. However, after leaving the office, Mei accidentally bumps into a fan who recognizes her and secretly records her showing her true personality. When the video is posted online, Mei suffers a breakdown, fearing she has accidentally ruined Straylight's image. However, both Fuyuko and Asahi remind her that Straylight is meant to be a place where they can express their true selves, and they are willing to accept Mei changing her image. Encouraged, Mei heads to their next performance with a newfound confidence.
10	"That's My Dream"; Transliteration: "Sore ga Watashi no Yume Datte" (Japanese: それが私の夢だって)	Susumu Sugai	Yoichi Kato	Ryō Ogawa, Yuki Tamada & Takeshi Iwata	December 7, 2024
As the Houkago Climax Girls prepare for the upcoming nationwide tour, the Producer gives them questionnaires to fill out to give the audience. However, Chiyoko finds she has trouble answering the final question, which asks what kind of idol she would like to be. As Chiyoko reflects on the question, she recalls when she first auditioned to be an idol. Originally, she was accompanying a friend, Asumi, to her audition, but when Asumi lost her nerve and pulled out of the audition, Chiyoko took her place instead and was accepted. Asumi was impressed that Chiyoko was able to step up to take her place and asked her to become an idol in her stead. The Producer then takes the girls to stay at a cabin overnight for their next photoshoot. That night, they discuss how they answered the last question, with Juri wanting to show her appreciation to her fans, Natsuha wanting to be the number one idol, and Rinzmewantings to be an idol who puts her heart into everything. Chiyoko admits that she sometimes doesn't feel she belongs in the group due to auditioning in the place of Asumi, but resolves to become an idol who fulfills her own wishes rather than somebody else's. Happy that Chiyoko has finally found their resolve, the girls head out to their photoshoot the next morning.
11	"What I Can Do"; Transliteration: "Watashi ni Dekiru Koto" (Japanese: 私にできること)	Takeshi Iwata	Yoichi Kato	Ryō Ogawa & Takeshi Iwata	December 14, 2024
Thanks to her charisma and unconventional sense of humor, Toru rapidly gains popularity and starts receiving so many job offers that the Producer is concerned that she is taking on too much workload, but she insists that she is fine. Meanwhile, Illumination Stars is still trying to come up with a theme for their performance in the national tour, while Mano is still struggling with finding out what kind of idol she wants to be. Mano meets with Toru again and voices her concerns, fearing that she's not putting all the effort she can into becoming an idol. Toru maintains that she believes Mano is already a great idol and that she is actually inspired by how hard she works. With newfound motivation, Toru returns to Noctlight to take her practice more seriously. Mano returns to Illumination Stars, ready to suggest their theme. Later, the Producer is glad that all of the idol groups have finally decided on their songs as the preparations for the first concert in the national tour begin.
12	"The Brilliance of This Moment Alone"; Transliteration: "Ima, Kono Toki dake no Kagayaki" (Japanese: 今、この時だけの輝き)	Takeshi Iwata & Hirofumi Katayama	Yoichi Kato	Ryō Ogawa & Takeshi Iwata	December 21, 2024
The idols begin to gather at the concert venue for the first stop in their national tour as they prepare for their performances. Initially, Noctlight is uncertain whether they are worthy of performing alongside the other idols, but watching illumination STARS performing their new song "As Many as the Stars" as well as getting a chance to stand on the stage gives them the courage to successfully perform their song "We Are Always Who We Are". After the rest of the groups perform their songs, everybody gathers on stage for the finale. Mano gives a speech to the audience, thanking them for their support and stating that as long as the idols and audience continue to support each other, they will continue to grow. The idols then perform their finale song "Prism Flare". After the end of the concert, both the Producer and Mano reflect that everyone will keep searching for the kind of idol they want to be and keep growing in the process.

=== Merchandise ===
Starting in late 2023, Bandai Spirits released model kits of characters from The Idolmaster Shiny Colors as part of the 30 Minutes Sisters line.
