= Princess Principal: Crown Handler =

Japanese animated film series by Masaki Tachibana

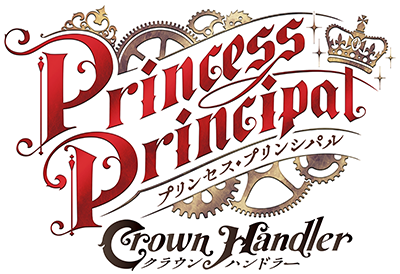
- Kanji: プリンセス・プリンシパル Crown Handler
- Revised Hepburn: Purinsesu Purinshiparu: Kuraun Handorā
- Directed by: Masaki Tachibana
- Screenplay by: Noboru Kimura
- Produced by: Toshikazu Sugimoto; Kazuyoshi Nishikawa; Yoshinori Hasegawa; Hirotaka Kaneko; Yōhei Hata^{C1}; Yoko Baba^{C1}; Kōsuke Satō^{C2} ^{C3} ^{C4}; Hirohito Sakemi^{C2} ^{C3}; Jin Tsuchihashi^{C3} ^{C4}; Takeshi Ara^{C4}
- Starring: Aoi Koga; Akira Sekine; Yō Taichi; Akari Kageyama; Nozomi Furuki
- Cinematography: Yu Wakabayashi
- Edited by: Gō Sadamatsu
- Music by: Yuki Kajiura
- Production company: Actas
- Distributed by: Showgate
- Release dates: February 11, 2021 (Chapter 1); September 23, 2021 (Chapter 2); April 7, 2023 (Chapter 3); May 23, 2025 (Chapter 4)
- Running time: Total (4 films): 228 minutes
- Country: Japan
- Language: Japanese
- Box office: Total (4 films): ¥349 million

Princess Principal: Crown Handler (Japanese: プリンセス・プリンシパル Crown Handler, Hepburn: Purinsesu Purinshiparu: Kuraun Handorā) is a six-part Japanese animated spy action film series and a sequel to the 2017 anime television series Princess Principal. Produced by Actas and distributed by Showgate, the film series is directed by Masaki Tachibana from a script written by Noboru Kimura and stars Aoi Koga, Akira Sekine, Yō Taichi, Akari Kageyama, and Nozomi Furuki.

The film series follows Ange, Princess, Dorothy, Beatrice, and Chise, members of Team White Pigeon, as they are assigned to investigate Bishop, the Commonwealth spy within the Kingdom's royal family, for his loyalty. Following his death from an assailant and an assassination attempt on Prince Richard, the team is tasked to find the Cavorite bombs that are stolen from the Commonwealth. After the incident of missing bombs, Richard, the mastermind behind it and the assassination of Prince Edward, invites Princess to join him for his plan to reform the Kingdom. The death of Prince Edward, who is first in line to succeed the Queen of the Kingdom, has caused a power struggle between Richard and Princess Mary, who is second in the line of succession.

A sequel to the anime series was announced in April 2018. The staff and cast for the first film in the series were revealed in September 2019, with Koga replacing Ayaka Imamura as the voice actress for Ange due to the latter's health condition. Its production was completed in March 2020. The staff and cast for the second film in the series were revealed in July 2021, while its production was completed in August. The staff and cast for the third film in the series were revealed in November 2022. The staff and cast for the fourth film were revealed in February 2025.

Four films in the Princess Principal: Crown Handler series have been released in Japan since 2021: Chapter 1 on February 11, Chapter 2 on September 23, Chapter 3 on April 7, 2023, and Chapter 4 on May 23, 2025. The film series has grossed over ¥349 million in Japan.

== Films ==
=== Chapter 1 ===
In response to the assassination attempt on the Queen, the Duke of Normandy begins cracking down on suspected Commonwealth of Albion spies. Concerned that their mole within the royal family may be a double agent, Control tasks the Team White Pigeon with making contact with the mole and investigating him. Ange disguises herself as Princess and meets the mole in the royal palace, and is surprised to discover that the mole is Winston, the grand chamberlain and the man that used to take care of her when she was a child. Winston recognizes Ange and lets her know that he is aware she is the real Princess and the other is an impostor. Ange and Princess explain to the rest of the team that he knows they are investigating him. Despite knowing the risk of Winston exposing them, the team continues to investigate him and discovers that Winston has been secretly communicating with an unknown third party through coded messages he has hidden in the Queen's speeches. The team manages to expose him by feeding him false information and tricking him into sending out a message they can intercept. Control orders the team to detain Winston for interrogation, but Ange secretly arranges for his escape in return for keeping her and Princess' secret. Winston parts amicably with Ange but is shot by an assassin. With his dying words, Winston warns Ange that if she continues living a life of lies, she will end up like him. In the aftermath, both the Duke of Normandy and Control become aware of the unknown third party's involvement as the team feels defeated in failing to save Winston.

=== Chapter 2 ===
The Commonwealth tests a new and destructive Cavorite bomb which they intend to use against the Kingdom of Albion. Meanwhile, Prince Richard returns to the Kingdom but is injured in an assassination attempt. Control gives Team White Pigeon a new mission to search for three Cavorite bombs that were stolen from the Commonwealth and smuggled into the Kingdom, with the concern that those bombs may be used to instigate a war between both nations. Following a lead, the team investigates the Vegas Steam Theater and finds the bombs hidden there. They then put the theater under surveillance while they wait for Control to organize a retrieval team. However, when the surveillance teams are killed by the assassin, Ange, Dorothy, and Chise have no choice but to raid the theater. They manage to capture the smuggler and recover two of the bombs, but they find out the third one has been smuggled onto a yacht where a royal ceremony is being held with Princess, Beatrice, and Princess Mary present. With Ange's quick thinking, they manage to stop the bomb from detonating and prevent it from falling into the Kingdom's hands. Princess returns to the royal palace, only to discover Prince Edward has been assassinated. She comes across Richard, who admits he was behind the bomb plot and Edward's death as he wants to seize power and reform the Kingdom. He then asks Princess whether she will join him or not.

=== Chapter 3 ===
Richard says he will wait for Princess' decision to his ultimatum. After Princess revealed Richard's ambition and role in the assassination of Edward, Team White Pigeon decides to not make any decisions for the moment and informs Control. Control orders the team to infiltrate the royal household—Princess and Beatrice staying in the palace, while Ange and Dorothy pose as maids—to investigate the power struggles in the royal family. As the current one who is in line for the throne, Mary is given more strict lessons and training to prepare her for her future duties. Princess speaks with Richard again and learns that he wants to fix inequality not just in Albion but also on the world stage. Richard covertly provokes nobles to demand that the Duke of Normandy be removed from his post as the Home Secretary for failing to protect Edward while in public. The Duke of Normandy tells Richard that he is aware of his machinations. Meanwhile, Richard also arranges for Mary's education to be even more strict along with a grueling schedule, much to the consternation of Olivia, Mary's lady-in-waiting. Overcome by the stress, Mary tries to escape through the window and endangers herself, but she is saved by Dorothy. After discussing it with the others, Princess arranges a tea time with the rest of Team White Pigeon to provide Mary a break from her studies. Hearing of this, Richard plots to depose Mary more directly and arranges a plot on her life while Princess is not with her, but the result is unsuccessful. Distraught by this news, Princess decides that she wants to help Mary flee the country as her life is in danger, which is approved by Control. The operation goes smoothly at first but before Mary and Olivia can escape over the wall into the Commonwealth, they are intercepted by the Kingdom's forces. Team White Pigeon is arrested with their identities exposed. The Duke of Normandy reveals to Princess that he has also arrested Richard on suspicion of his role in assassinating Edward and gives Princess an ultimatum to become a double agent for the Kingdom.

=== Chapter 4 ===
After attempts to interrogate the members of Team White Pigeon prove to be unsuccessful, the Duke of Normandy decides to release them on the condition they act as his double agents, threatening the lives of Princess and Beatrice. Richard remains in custody and also refuses to talk. Dorothy makes a fake report to Control that they escaped custody, but they still suspect they have been turned. The Duke of Normandy then offers a trade to Control by giving up Graham Turner, an engraver responsible for creating counterfeit Commonwealth bills, in return for the smuggler who stole the Cavorite bombs. Control tasks Team White Pigeon to collect information on Turner to test their loyalty. The team members infiltrate the factory Turner works at and discover that the factory is secretly intercepting the allowances Turner is sending to his wife in the Commonwealth, and sending him fake response letters from her to keep up the charade. They deliver a letter from Turner's wife directly to him, which convinces him to defect to the Commonwealth. They take Turner to a safehouse, but the smuggler is assassinated by the Commonwealth military before he can be handed over. With the trade thwarted, Gazelle orders Team White Pigeon to kill Turner as a loose end. Ange and Dorothy have a disagreement over following Control or Gazelle's directives, until Turner offers to have his injured right arm cut off to fake his death. In the end, the Kingdom grudgingly accepts Turner's "death" and he reunites with his wife, but the operation confirms to Control that Team White Pigeon is compromised. Ange echoes Winston's last words to her friends, warning them as long as they are double agents, they need to figure what they are really fighting for. Meanwhile, Richard is broken out of prison by Zelda, who promises to help him start a new Revolution.

== Cast and staff ==
=== Voice cast ===
This section includes characters who have appeared in more than two films in the series.

- An empty, dark grey cell indicates the character was not in the film.
- A green cell indicates the voice actor is a Japanese cast member.
- A white cell indicates the voice actor is an English dub cast member.

Character	Chapter 1	Chapter 2	Chapter 3	Chapter 4
Ange	Aoi Koga	Aoi Koga	Aoi Koga	Aoi Koga
Ange	Avery Smithhart	Avery Smithhart	TBA	TBA
Princess	Akira Sekine	Akira Sekine	Akira Sekine	Akira Sekine
Princess	Patricia Duran	Patricia Duran	TBA	TBA
Dorothy	Yō Taichi	Yō Taichi	Yō Taichi	Yō Taichi
Dorothy	Elizabeth Bunch	Elizabeth Bunch	TBA	TBA
Beatrice	Akari Kageyama	Akari Kageyama	Akari Kageyama	Akari Kageyama
Beatrice	Shanae'a Moore	Shanae'a Moore	TBA	TBA
Chise	Nozomi Furuki	Nozomi Furuki	Nozomi Furuki	Nozomi Furuki
Chise	Rachael Messer	Rachael Messer	TBA	TBA
L	Takayuki Sugō	Takayuki Sugō	Takayuki Sugō	Takayuki Sugō
L	David Wald	David Wald	TBA	TBA
7	Miyuki Sawashiro	Miyuki Sawashiro	Miyuki Sawashiro	Miyuki Sawashiro
7	Heidi Hinkle	Heidi Hinkle	TBA	TBA
Dolly Shop	Hiroyuki Honda	Hiroyuki Honda	Hiroyuki Honda	Hiroyuki Honda
Dolly Shop	Mark Laskowski	Mark Laskowski	TBA	TBA
The Colonel	Takumi Yamazaki	Takumi Yamazaki	Takumi Yamazaki	Takumi Yamazaki
The Colonel	Chris Hutchison	Chris Hutchison	TBA	TBA
The Duke of Normandy	Takaya Hashi	Takaya Hashi	Takaya Hashi	Takaya Hashi
The Duke of Normandy	Jay Hickman	Jay Hickman	TBA	TBA
Gazelle	Yūko Iida	Yūko Iida	Yūko Iida	Yūko Iida
Gazelle	Melanie Burke	Melanie Burke	TBA	TBA
Queen	Eiko Hanawa	Eiko Hanawa	Eiko Hanawa	
Queen	Juliet Oliver-Touchstone	Juliet Oliver-Touchstone	TBA	
Head butler	Mitsuki Nakamura	Mitsuki Nakamura		
Head butler	John Swasey	Ty Mahany		
Mary		Rina Endō	Rina Endō	Rina Endō
Mary		Cat Thomas	TBA	TBA
Richard		Kazuyuki Okitsu	Kazuyuki Okitsu	Kazuyuki Okitsu
Richard		Adam Gibbs	TBA	TBA
Olivia		Minami Takahashi	Minami Takahashi	
Olivia		Rachel Brownhill	TBA	

=== Staff ===
Staff	Chapter 1	Chapter 2	Chapter 3	Chapter 4
Director	Masaki Tachibana			
Screenwriter	Noboru Kimura			
Original character designer	Kōhaku Kuroboshi			
Character designer	Yukie Akiya and Kimitake Nishio			
Chief animation director	Kimitake Nishio			
Concept artist	Munashichi			
Mechanical designer	Fumihiro Katagai			
Researcher	Seiichi Shirato			
Design assistant	Rasenjin Hayami			
Prop designer	Ryō Akizuki			
Composer	Yuki Kajiura			
Sound director	Yoshikazu Iwanami			
Art director	Miho Sugiura			
Art designer	Morihito Ohara, Yuuho Taniuchi, Gō Taniguchi, and Noboru Jitsuhara			
Color designer	Yuko Tsumori			
Head of 3D animation	Tri-Slash			
Graphic artist	Hirofumi Araki			
Director of photography	Yu Wakabayashi			
Editor	Gō Sadamatsu			
Animation studio	Actas			
Distributor	Showgate			

== Production ==
A sequel to the 2017 anime television series Princess Principal was announced in April 2018, which would comprise six films. Masaki Tachibana, who directed the series, and chief producer Atsushi Yukawa agreed on the sequel being in film format because doing it as another television series would be "physically demanding". Ayaka Imamura, who voiced Ange in the series, announced her retirement in June 2018 due to declining health. The production staff and committee collaborated with her talent agency With Line to begin auditions for the role. The film series received its full title in September 2019.

The staff for the first film in the series, Princess Principal: Crown Handler – Chapter 1, were revealed in September 2019. Tachibana would be directing the film, and Noboru Kimura was revealed to be supervising and writing the script instead of Ichirō Ōkouchi who have worked on the series. Actas would solely animate the film; the studio previously collaborated with Studio 3Hz in the series. Additionally, Aoi Koga was revealed as the new voice actress for Ange, with Akira Sekine, Yō Taichi, Akari Kageyama, and Nozomi Furuki reprising their roles as Princess, Dorothy, Beatrice, and Chise, respectively. In February 2020, Nobuo Tobita joined the cast as Bishop, a spy within the Albion royal family who knows the Princess' true identity. Shunpei Maruyama, president of Actas, announced that the film was completed in March 2020 despite the ongoing COVID-19 pandemic. The films James Bond, Mission: Impossible, and Charlie's Angels influenced Chapter 1, but Tachibana used Tinker Tailor Soldier Spy (2011) to accomplish "a realistic spy story". While working on the script, Kimura was inspired by the American television series The Blacklist since he was interested on how "the drama and the development [of the series] mesh well". Tachibana likened the action scene at the double-deck bus to Jackie Chan's 1985 film Police Story. Sentai Filmworks revealed the English dub cast in February 2022.

The returning staff and cast for the second film in the series, Princess Principal: Crown Handler – Chapter 2, were revealed in July 2021. Additionally, new characters were introduced, namely Edward, Mary, and Richard, the members of Albion royal family who are all in line of succession. Maruyama announced that the film was completed in August 2021. The dragon Smerg from Michael Ende's 1979 novel The Neverending Story influenced the Steam Dragon animatronics scene. In August 2022, Sentai Filmworks revealed the film would receive an English dub.

The production on the third film in the series, Princess Principal: Crown Handler – Chapter 3, were announced in September 2021. That month, Teruyuki Tanzawa, Rina Endō, and Kazuyuki Okitsu were revealed to be voicing Edward, Mary, and Richard, respectively. The returning staff and cast were announced in November 2022. Tachibana stated the film would help the viewers to "finally begin to understand the meaning of the title Crown Handler". An English dub by Sentai Filmworks for the film is available.

The returning staff and cast for the fourth film in the series, Princess Principal: Crown Handler – Chapter 4, were confirmed in February 2025. That month, Isao Sasaki joined the cast as Turner.

== Music ==
Yuki Kajiura was confirmed to be composing Princess Principal: Crown Handler in September 2019, after previously working on Princess Principal. In October 2019, Void_Chords and Yui Mugino were revealed to be performing the opening theme song "Lies & Ties". Masami Shimoda directed the opening theme video; Shimoda was first offered to direct the eleventh episode of the series but declined due to conflicting schedule. In January 2020, the ending theme song was revealed as "Nowhere Land", which was performed by Ange (Koga), Princess (Sekine), Dorothy (Taichi), Beatrice (Kageyama), and Chise (Furuki). Lantis released their singles in Japan on April 8, 2020. In August 2021, FictionJunction and Shuri were revealed to be performing the insert song "Fairy Game" in Princess Principal: Crown Handler – Chapter 2.

== Marketing ==
A key visual and trailer announcing the sequel project were released in April 2018. In preparation for the release of Princess Principal: Crown Handler – Chapter 1, Misato Fukuen narrated a one-minute summary of each episodes of Princess Principal. The episodes were released on the official YouTube channel of Bandai Namco Arts on January 31, 2021. A collaboration between Princess Principal: Crown Handler – Chapter 2 and the mobile game Girls und Panzer: Senshado Daisakusen! was held from September to October 2021; the game and the film series had another collaboration in August 2022 until September. In November 2021, collaboration goods, such as T-shirt, acrylic stand, pin badge, clear file, tapestry, and pouch, featuring Ange and Princess in their designs began selling in Don Quijote stores. Merchandises for the film series became available in GraffArt Shop stores in Ikebukuro, Namba, and Nagoya in February 2022.

== Release ==
=== Theatrical ===
Princess Principal: Crown Handler – Chapter 1 was released in Japan on February 11, 2021. The film was previously scheduled to be released in 2019, before it was shifted to April 10, 2020, and then to the February 2021 premiere due to COVID-19 pandemic. Princess Principal: Crown Handler – Chapter 2 was released in Japan on September 23, 2021. Princess Principal: Crown Handler – Chapter 3 was released in Japan on April 7, 2023. Princess Principal: Crown Handler – Chapter 4 was released in Japan on May 23, 2025; it had an early screening a day before.

=== Home media ===
The Blu-rays of Princess Principal: Crown Handler films were distributed by Bandai Namco Filmworks, under their label Emotion, in Japan, Sentai Filmworks in the United States and Canada, and MVM Entertainment in the United Kingdom and Ireland.

Film	Format	Country	Release date	Ref(s)
Chapter 1	Blu-ray	Japan	September 28, 2021	
Chapter 1	Blu-ray	United States, Canada	March 15, 2022	
Chapter 1	Blu-ray	United Kingdom, Ireland	August 8, 2022	
Chapter 2	Blu-ray	Japan	March 29, 2022	
Chapter 2	Blu-ray	United States, Canada	November 22, 2022	
Chapter 2	Blu-ray collector's edition	United Kingdom, Ireland	November 28, 2022	
Chapter 3	Blu-ray	Japan	November 22, 2023	
Chapter 3	Blu-ray	United States, Canada	April 8, 2025	
Chapter 3	Blu-ray	United Kingdom	June 16, 2025	
Chapter 4	Blu-ray	Japan	January 28, 2026	

The first two films were streamed on Hidive: Chapter 1 on May 26, 2021, and Chapter 2 on February 21, 2023.

== Reception ==
=== Box office ===
As of June 3, 2025, the four Princess Principal: Crown Handler films have collectively grossed ¥349 million in Japan.

Film	Box office gross	Ref(s)
Chapter 1	¥100 million	
Chapter 2	¥99 million	
Chapter 3	¥90 million	
Chapter 4	¥60 million	
Total	¥349 million	

=== Critical response ===
The Japanese review and survey firm Filmarks placed Princess Principal: Crown Handler – Chapter 2 third in their first-day satisfaction ranking, with an average rating of 4.05/5 based on 129 reviews. Princess Principal: Crown Handler – Chapter 3 was placed third in the firm's first-day satisfaction ranking, with an average rating of 4.03/5 based on 79 reviews. Princess Principal: Crown Handler – Chapter 4 was placed second in the firm's first-day satisfaction ranking, with an average rating of 4.05/5 based on 130 reviews.

Richard Eisenbeis of Anime News Network gave Princess Principal: Crown Handler – Chapter 1 a grade of "B", feeling that the film was a "high-stakes spy story and a personally emotional tale all in one. It's a fun little self-contained mystery—but one with revelations and repercussions that will no doubt have a major effect on the Crown Handler films going forward." Eisenbeis praised the film for the story setup that gave Ange a character development, introducing a mysterious third party that upset the status quo between the major players (Commonwealth and the Duke of Normandy), its major action sequence, and the opening theme song. However, he noted that the majority of the cast were "largely ignored."

Eisenbeis gave Chapter 2 a grade of "B", feeling that the film "delivers some solid character development for Charlotte and gives us a healthy helping of spy action that is simply fun to watch. And best of all, it ends on a cliffhanger that makes you want to rewatch both this film and the previous one to absorb every little hint about what is actually going on." He lauded the "good" setting and character design, and the insert song ("Fairy Game"), but he noted that Beatrice had nothing to do despite the other main characters had "much more to do in this film than in the previous one."

Eisenbeis gave Chapter 3 a grade of "B+", feeling that it was "easily the best of the Crown Handler films so far. It's full of high-stakes tension as our heroes play their spy game while fighting an internal battle between pragmatism and idealism—with a young girl's life hanging in the balance. To top it off, the film ends with a climax that completely upsets the status quo and promises a completely new direction for things going forward." However, he criticized the "least impressive" visuals, and lack of action sequences and Beatrice's presence.

Eisenbeis gave Chapter 4 a grade of "C+", feeling that the film was "anticlimactic" and immediately returned to "status quo with a mission that feels insanely low-stakes given the events of the previous film." However, he praised the locations and backgrounds as "excellent", the action for having "more than a few memorable shots" despite being limited, and the music for its "somber notes" during the emotional moments and giving a "big band score" during action scenes. He also found the climax "surprisingly tense" and noted Beatrice for having a spotlight in the film.

=== Accolades ===
In December 2021, the first two Princess Principal: Crown Handler films were among the Top 100 Favorites nominated by fans to win Anime of the Year and Anime Fan Award at the Tokyo Anime Award Festival 2022.

== Original video animations ==
Each of the Blu-rays of Princess Principal: Crown Handler – Chapter 1, Chapter 2, Chapter 3, and Chapter 4 was bundled with an original video animation.

No.	Title	Directed by	Written by	Original release date
1	"Busy Easy Money"	Hiroaki Kudō	Noboru Kimura	September 28, 2021
Dorothy wins a £1000 bet on horse racing. While Ange tallies the money, members of Team White Pigeon discuss what they are going to do if each of them has this much money. Beatrice wants to enjoy Parisian cream puffs, Chise plans to build a Japanese temple in Albion, and Princess wants to go to the moon. When Ange realizes that the funds are insufficient, Dorothy is forced to admit that she has won further bets. Dorothy eventually resolves to donate them for charity.
2	"Revealing Reviews"	Hiroaki Kudō	Noboru Kimura	March 29, 2022
Beatrice and Chise talk about their dislikes from the theater play that they have visited with Princess. Chise laments that she is unable to see the animatronic dragon fly, while Beatrice is upset about the story of the handmaid's exile after being abandoned by the fake princess whom she has defended from the king. As Team White Pigeon heads home, Dorothy reminds Ange to not vanish on her own.
3	"Cost for Custom Cars"	Masaki Tachibana	Noboru Kimura	November 22, 2023
Control grants Team White Pigeon permission to purchase a new car for their missions. Each of the members of the team present what features they can add to the car's design. Dorothy wants to add a compartment on the car door to hold alcoholic drinks. Beatrice wants to prioritize safety by adding armored plating and wheels linked by belts. Princess proposes elegant designs featuring gramophones, flowers, and a swan head. Chise proposes a castle-themed car. Finally, Ange presents a blueprint of the car that can fly and travel underwater.
4	"Fabulous Platypus"	Masaki Tachibana	Noboru Kimura	January 28, 2026

== Works cited ==
- ^{C1} indicates the producer only worked on Princess Principal: Crown Handler – Chapter 1.
- ^{C2} indicates the producer only worked on Princess Principal: Crown Handler – Chapter 2.
- ^{C3} indicates the producer only worked on Princess Principal: Crown Handler – Chapter 3.
- ^{C4} indicates the producer only worked on Princess Principal: Crown Handler – Chapter 4.
