= Hybrid × Heart Magias Academy Ataraxia =

Japanese light novel series

- Cover of the first volume, Featuring Aine and Kizuna, released in 2014.

魔装学園H×H (Masō Gakuen Haiburiddo Hāto)
- Genre: Action, fantasy, harem
- Light novel
- Written by: Masamune Kuji
- Illustrated by: Hisasi
- Published by: Kadokawa Shoten
- Imprint: Kadokawa Sneaker Bunko
- Original run: 1 February 2014 – 1 September 2019
- Volumes: 14
- Manga
- Written by: Riku Ayakawa
- Published by: Kadokawa Shoten
- English publisher: NA: Yen Press
- Magazine: Comp Ace
- Original run: 26 June 2015 – 25 January 2018
- Volumes: 4
- Anime television series
- Directed by: Hiroyuki Furukawa
- Produced by: Junichiro Tamura; Takashi Tachizaki
- Written by: Yasunori Yamada
- Music by: Hanihohenio; Jerkyboy & Timteng
- Studio: Production IMS
- Licensed by: Crunchyroll
- Original network: AT-X, Tokyo MX, Sun TV, KBS, TV Saitama, CTV, tvk, BS11
- Original run: 5 July 2016 – 20 September 2016
- Episodes: 12
- Original video animation

Love Room
- Studio: Production IMS
- Released: 30 September 2016 – 24 February 2017
- Episodes: 6
- icon

Hybrid × Heart Magias Academy Ataraxia (魔装学園H×H(ハイブリッドハート), Masō Gakuen Haiburiddo Hāto) is a Japanese light novel series written by Masamune Kuji and illustrated by Hisasi. Riku Ayakawa is drawing a manga adaptation in Kadokawa's Comp Ace magazine. An anime television series adaptation by Production IMS aired from 5 July 2016 to 20 September 2016.

== Plot ==
The plot of the story occurs in the future when Earth is attacked by invaders from another universe through portals, and using weaponry that combines magic and science. Mankind's weapons are practically useless against the invaders. Mankind is forced to retreat from land and develops giant floating structures referred to as Mega Floats. A weapon referred to as Heart Hybrid Gear or HHG is developed, which is the only effective weapon against the invaders. A core is implanted within a person and by calling out the HHG's name, one can summon an armor around them which can effectively combat the Alternate Universe (AU) forces. Hida Kizuna possesses a HHG, but it is not strong enough to make him particularly important. His older sister calls him to transfer to a strategic defense school, where many of the students use their HHG abilities to fight invaders from another world while wearing extremely skimpy pilot outfits. Kizuna's fighting ability doesn't measure up, but his sister has another plan — performing erotic activities with Kizuna will allow the girls to replenish their energy or power-up. His ability proves to be critical to their success, as he and the other members of the Ataraxia defense academy find themselves engaged in a hidden agenda about the destruction of two worlds as well as to bring back his beloved from sorrow.

== Characters ==
=== Ataraxia ===
Strategic Defense Academy Ataraxia is an academy for people who use Heart Hybrid Gear. It is also a Megafloat system cut off from mainland Japan. It was established in response to the arrival and mass onslaught of the Batlantis invasion force.

Kizuna Hida (飛弾 傷無, Hida Kizuna)
Voiced by: Dotama Shinjuku (drama CD), Kenji Akabane (TV series)
The central protagonist of the story. He was implanted with the first Heart Hybrid Gear (HHG) core as a child in an experiment conducted by his mother, the apparent creator of the HHG. However since men have a low compatibility with HHG, his armor has low offensive capabilities. His primary function is to Heart Hybrid with the female Amaterasu to restore their powers and achieve a Climax Hybrid so they can access their Immoral Weapons or Corruption Armament. Because of this ability, he is made captain of the Amaterasu, an elite team in Ataraxia. His HHG has the name 'Eros'. When it is seen that there are no men in Batlantis, it is confirmed that Kizuna is the only male HHG user.

Aine Chidorigafuchi (千鳥ヶ淵 愛音, Chidorigafuchi Aine)
Voiced by: Ayaka Kimura (drama CD), Akari Kageyama (TV series)
One of the Amaterasu, she is a beautiful girl with long silver hair, red eyes and large bust. Her HHG is called 'Zeros' one of the 'Ros' series. Her Corruption Armament is called 'Pulverizer' a strange weapon that appears to be across between a sword and a cannon. She has no memory of her childhood, and is known by the Batlantis who believe that she is one of them. She is eventually revealed to be Aines Synclavier (アイネス・シンクラヴィア, Ainesu Shinkuravia), the first daughter of the Batlantis Empire's emperor who is crowned Empress after her father's death at the age of 10.

Yurishia Farandole (ユリシア・ファランドール, Yurishia Farandōru)
Voiced by: Hikaru Isshiki (drama CD), Chinatsu Akasaki (TV series)
One of the Amaterasu, she is a beautiful girl with long blonde hair, blue eyes and large bust. She was once the Ace of the American team of HHG users, 'Masters' before shifting to Ataraxia and becoming part of Amaterasu. Her HHG is called 'Kuros' another of the 'Ros' series. Her Corruption Armament is called "Crosshead" and is the only close range weapon of her HHG, having a range of only one meter, but its power is overwhelming.

Hayuru Himekawa (姫川 ハユル, Himekawa Hayuru)
Voiced by: Ichigo Momoi (drama CD), Juri Nagatsuma (TV series)
One of the Amaterasu, she is a beautiful girl with black eyes. She has long black hair with red ribbons that keep her hair in twintails. She wears an academic uniform which is white and red. As a member of the morals committee, Hayuru has a very harsh and strict personality. She is very impatient and angers easily. Her HHG is called 'Neros'. Her weapon is a device that gives her 8 sharp bladed tools, that looks similar to a Japanese katana. Her Corruption Armament is a double bladed sword, almost 2 meters long called 'Gladius'.

Silvia Silkcut (シルヴィア・シルクカット, Shiruvia Shirukukatto)
Voiced by: Junka Koseki (drama CD), Hina Kino (TV series)
The last and youngest member of the Amaterasu with short blonde hair and purple eyes. She usually wears her school uniform. She is a transfer student from Great Britain and Kizuna's direct subordinate. Kizuna installs the final 'Ros' series core, 'Taros' within her. Her Corruption Armament is called 'Titania' which allows her to project a small black hole for a short period. She can only use this once before becoming exhausted.

Reiri Hida (飛弾 怜悧, Hida Reiri)
Voiced by: Rino Kawashima (drama CD), Rika Kinugawa (TV series)
Older sister of Kizuna. She is the Principal and Commander of Ataraxia. She and Kizuna have the same black hair and eyes, and she is usually seen wearing a white uniform. Unlike Kizuna, she seems unemotional and has no affection for their mother. She dispassionately uses Kizuna to Heart Hybrid with the female Amaterasu. She later forms a secret romantic relationship with Kizuna, despite being related, and becomes pregnant with his child at the end of the series.

Kei Shikina (識名 京, Shikina Kei)
Voiced by: Iori Nomizu (TV series)
Lab Director and Chief Engineer.

Momo Kurumizawa (胡桃沢 桃, Kurumisawa Momo)
Voiced by: Kazusa Aranami (TV series)
The engineering department's top student.

Nayuta Hida (飛弾 那由多, Hida Nayuta)
Voiced by: Mei Satosaki (TV series)
Kizuna and Reiri's Mother.

=== Masters ===
Masters are America's Heart Hybrid Gear team.

Scarlet Fairchild (スカーレット・フェアチャイルド, Sukāretto Feachairudo)
Voiced by: Shizuka Ishigami
The Captain of the Masters, the HHG team of the West USA megafloat. Her HHG is called Ares, and produces a large number of missiles. In her first appearance she seems to hate Yurishia, because of an apparent betrayal, but Kizuna helps repair their relationship by showing what actually happened. She and Yurishia then perform Climax Hybrid with Kizuna, which allows him to use both their weapons at once. Her HHG has no Corruption Armament, but it becomes extremely powerful after Heart Hybrid.

Gertrude Baird (ガートルード・ベアード, Gātorūdo Beādo)
Voiced by: Yuuki Yamada
A member of Masters, she is severely wounded during the Battle with Grabel and becomes a wheelchair user for an extended period. She becomes the only HHG user when the rest get stuck in Batlantis.

Sharon Cunningham (シャロン・カニンガム, Sharon Kaningamu)
Voiced by: Sayaka Horino

Henrietta Mackintosh (ヘンリエッタ・マッキントッシュ, Henrietta Makkintosshu)
Voiced by: Mari Misaki

Brigiette Arkwright (ブリジット・アークライト, Burijitto Ākuraito)
Voiced by: Asuka Yuki

Clementine Burrows (クレメンタイン・バロウズ, Kurementain Barōzu)
Voiced by: Rika Momokawa

Leila Hewitt (レイラ・ヒューイット, Reira hyūitto)
Voiced by: Misaki Suzuki

=== Batlantis Empire ===
Batlantis is another world, that exists in another reality. They traverse to and fro between both Earth's dimension and their own, through a tear in the fabric of reality. Unlike Earth, there they have developed with both magic and science, which makes their technology many times more advanced and is the primary reason for the defeat humanity suffered.

Grace Sinclavia (グレイス・シンクラヴィア, Gureisu Shinkuravuia)
Voiced by: Manami Tanaka
Aine's younger sister and current Empress of the Batlantis Empire.

Grabel (グラベル, Guraberu)
Voiced by: Rumi Okubo
A soldier of the Batlantis Empire, she has tanned skin, short blonde hair and is extremely powerful. She is from another country conquered by Batlantis and is the first to discover 'Zeros' with Aine. She and Aldea have strong affections for each other. She also falls in love with Kizuna and becomes the first girl to become pregnant with his child, eventually giving birth to their daughter Kizuna. Her HHG has a corruption armament, Sword Gattling, which she can use in Batlantis without Heart Hybrid.

Aldea (アルディア, Arudia)
Voiced by: Natsumi Yamada
A soldier of Batlantis and partner of Grabel.

Ragrus (ラグルス, Ragurusu)
An elite soldier, who is a member of the Batlantis Empire's Royal Guard.

Zelshione (ゼルシオーネ, Zerushiōne)
Voiced by: Yuu Asakawa
Captain of the Batlantis Empire's Royal Guard. She also falls in love with Kizuna and gives birth to their son whom she names Kizuna.

== Media ==
=== Light novels ===
The light novels are written by Masamune Kuji and illustrated by Hisasi, with mecha designs by Kurogin. The series is published by Kadokawa's Kadokawa Sneaker Bunko imprint. The first volume was released in February 2014. The series ended with the thirteenth volume on 1 July 2018. A drama CD based on the series was released in March 2015, written by Kuji.

No.	Japanese release date	Japanese ISBN
1	1 February 2014	978-4-04-101200-0
2	1 June 2014	978-4-04-101526-1
3	1 October 2014	978-4-04-102011-1
4	1 February 2015	978-4-04-102442-3
5	1 June 2015	978-4-04-102897-1
6	1 October 2015	978-4-04-102898-8
7	1 February 2016	978-4-04-103752-2
8	1 July 2016	978-4-04-103753-9
9	1 September 2016	978-4-04-104711-8
10	1 February 2017	978-4-04-104712-5
11	1 June 2017	978-4-04-104713-2
12	1 November 2017	978-4-04-105518-2
13	1 July 2018	978-4-04-106027-8
14	1 September 2019	978-4-04-108529-5

=== Manga ===
A manga adaptation with art by Riku Ayakawa began serialization in Kadokawa's Comp Ace on 26 June 2015. Yen Press has licensed the manga in North America.

No.	Original release date	Original ISBN	English release date	English ISBN
1	25 June 2016	978-4-04-104422-3	31 October 2017	978-0-316-47648-5
2	23 August 2016	978-4-04-104432-2	30 January 2018	978-0-316-44457-6
3	25 March 2017	978-4-04-105224-2	24 April 2018	978-1-9753-0123-1
4	24 March 2018	978-4-04-106489-4	13 November 2018	978-1-9753-2808-5

=== Anime ===
In September 2015, an anime adaptation of Hybrid × Heart Magias Academy Ataraxia was announced. In January 2016, Kuji announced via Twitter that the adaptation would be a TV series, which is scheduled to premiere in July 2016. The main cast and staff were officially announced in April 2016. The series is directed by Hiroyuki Furukawa, written by Yasunori Yamada, and produced by Production IMS, with character designs by Kana Miyai. Masakatsu Ohmuro of Dax Production served as the sound director. The music of the series is produced by Victor Entertainment's Flying Dog label. Two pieces of theme music is used: an opening theme and an ending theme. The opening theme is "miele paradiso" (lit. "Honey Paradise"), and the ending song is "Chi"; both are performed by Iori Nomizu.

The series premiered on 5 July 2016, and was broadcast on AT-X, Tokyo MX, TV Saitama, Chiba TV, tvk, KBS Kyoto, Sun TV, and BS11 then ended on 20 September 2016. Crunchyroll simulcast the series on their website. An original video animation series, titled Love Room, was bundled in the first and second volume of the home video release, containing an episode each. The first and second home video release volumes were released on 30 September 2016 and 28 October 2016, respectively. In North America, Funimation, which is now known as Crunchyroll, LLC, licensed the series for a home media release on 21 November 2017. However, in October 2017, the home media release was delayed.

No.	Title (Note: All English titles are taken from Crunchyroll.)	Original release date
1	"Strategic Defense Academy Ataraxia"; Transliteration: "Senryaku bōei gakuen -ATARAXIA-" (Japanese: 戦略防衛学園 -ATARAXIA-)	5 July 2016
Hayuru Himekawa is being erotically massaged by the manipulations of Kizuna Hida to the point where she climaxes. Recharged, Hayuru shouts 'Neros' and she become encased in Heart Hybrid Gear (HHG). She then attacks and destroys an alien invader. Aine Chidorigafuchi arrives and claims that she's next to be replenished by Kizuna even though her Hybrid Heart Count is high. The scene flashes back to when Kizuna was summoned to Strategic Defense Academy Ataraxia by his domineering sister Reiri Hida. He met Aine who was quite rude to him. They hear an air raid siren and she strips to her pilot suit and shouts "Zero", and her HHG encases her. She grabs a massive weapon from a hidden cache and takes off to fight the Magitech invaders while the Ataraxia Megafloat defense systems are activated. Aine exhausts her power during the battle and falls. Kizuna shouts "Eros" and converts to his HHG mode and catches her. His sister then orders him to massage Aine erotically to recharge her. Reluctantly he does, and she achieves Hybrid Heart and defeats all the invaders alone. Reiri Hida, Commander of Ataraxia is satisfied with the result of Hybrid Heart test using her brother Kizuna.
2	"Heart Hybrid"; Transliteration: "Setsuzoku kaisō -HEART HYBRID-" (Japanese: 接続改装 -HEART HYBRID-)	12 July 2016
Reiri Hida, Commander of Ataraxia describes the First World Collision of fifteen years ago when the aliens emerged from a tears in the fabric of reality from another dimension. The earth's defenses were ineffective, but after two weeks, the aliens left and the tears closed. Six months ago, the aliens reappeared in the Second World Collision. In the intervening period, Earth developed the Heart Hybrid Gear, and Kizuna is a key component in this strategy. Aine, Hayuru and then go to his room, and demand that he Hybrid Heart. They are all interrupted by Silvia Silkcut who takes Kizuna on a tour of the facility during which the Commander makes him a Captain and explains his purpose, providing Hybrid Heart to the female Amaterasu. Kizuna, Aine, Hayuru and Yurishia are sent on a mission to a nearby island. While Kizuna explores with Yurishia a tear opens and a Magitechs attack them and seals Aine and Hayuru in a dome. Yurishia defeats the Magitechs, but as she runs out of power, she is confronted by a Dragorie, a Category-A Magitech. Kizuna Hybrid Hearts with her, and recharged, she destroys all of the Magitechs. Later, the girls again argue over Kizuna.
3	"Gentle Days - Memories"; Transliteration: "Odayakanaru hibi -MEMORIES-" (Japanese: 穏やかなる日々 -MEMORIES-)	19 July 2016
Yurishia tries to get Kizuna interested in her, and convinces him to spend the day exploring the Megafloat with her. That evening he encounters Hayuru who talks about her ambitions. She falls, and when he catches her, she has an instant Hybrid Heart. He also meets Aine and learns more about her. She wants to Hybrid Heart to compete against the other girls, but Kizuna cannot do it mechanically. Later, Reiri tells him about Aine who as a little girl was found lost with amnesia. She was taken in and trained but without knowing about her past. Reiri also reveals they have recently discovered that if an Amaterasu's Hybrid counts drops to zero, they will die, which is why Kizuna is an essential part of Defense Academy's strategy.
4	"Climax Hybrid"; Transliteration: "Kuraimakkusu Haiburiddo -CLIMAX HYBRID-" (Japanese: 絶頂改装 -CLIMAX HYBRID-)	26 July 2016
When she was young, Commander Reiri reveals to Aine that her Hybrid Gear contains an Immoral Weapon. An enemy fleet approaches Ataraxia and the Amaterasu attack the flagship but they waste energy fighting the Magitechs. Aine arrives at the flagship first but is shot down as her energy levels are too low. Kizuna rescues her and returns her to base. She is despondent as she sees her only value as a fighter, without a past or connections to people. Kizuna consoles her and tries to raise her self-confidence and agrees to Hybrid Heart with her. Lab Director Kei Shikina advises him via a communications link that if he continues, Aine may achieve the Climax Hybrid and acquire the Immoral Weapon. They proceed and are successful. Kizuna and Aine rejoin the battle, he now has increased power and she has the Immoral Weapon which she uses to completely destroy the enemy fleet. Later, Aine tells Kizuna that during her Climax Hybrid she recovered some of her childhood memories, and wants to do it again. Kei Shikina believes she saw a human with the aliens attack fleet.
5	"Beauty of the Land of Rubble -Balantis-"; Transliteration: "Gareki no kuni no bijo -BATLANTIS-" (Japanese: 瓦礫の国の美女 -BATLANTIS-)	2 August 2016
In the past, Hayuru helps people evacuate Japan for a Megafloat. Kizuna is offered free use of the Academy baths, but finds Hayuru Himekawa there to both their embarrassment. Commander Reiri later tells them that she arranged the encounter to further their relationship and raise Hayuru's Hybrid Count. Commander Reiri introduces a new simulator room to Kizuna, not for mock battles with Magitechs, but to facilitate Hybrid Heart activities. Kizuna evaluates the simulator successfully with Yurishia. Meanwhile, although all communications between the Megafloats is broken, they receive a weak signal from Guam. Kizuna, Aine, Yurishia and Hayuru are sent to Guam to investigate. They find devastation, but Kizuna and Hayuru find a woman called Aldea with Heart Hybrid Gear who claims to represent the Empire of Batlantis in the other dimension. She overpowers them and calls on a powerful three-headed dragon Magitech from the other dimension to destroy them. Rather than suffer defeat, Kizuna orders the team to retreat.
6	"World-Splitter -Gladius-"; Transliteration: "Zessei hadan -GLADIUS-" (Japanese: 絶世破断 -GLADIUS-)	9 August 2016
The Amaterasu report on their mission to Guam, finding Aldea with her ability to warp space and the Tri-Head dragon. That night, Hayuru returns alone to confront Aldea, but is easily defeated. The other Amaterasu go to her aid, but Aldea recalls the Tri-Head Magitech. When Aldea learns Aine's HHG name, Zeros, she seems to recognise her. Commander Reiri then arrives and drops the simulator room for Kizuna to revive the powerless Hayuru. Hayuru admits her inadequacies, and how she failed to protect the people she evacuated from Japan. Kizuna offers to Hybrid Heart with her and she achieves Climax Hybrid. She emerges fully recharged and destroys the Tri-Head. Aldea attacks them all, but when she fires at Kizuna he responds by materialising a sword for the first time. When Aldea opens the portal for reinforcements, she is recalled and they retreat just as the Amaterasu from the Megafloast West USA arrive. Aine and Yurishia realise that prudish Hayuru reached Climax Hybrid with Kizuna.
7	"Imperial Hero -Grabel-"; Transliteration: "Teikoku no eiyū -GRABEL-" (Japanese: 帝国の英雄 -GRABEL-)	16 August 2016
Aine has a dream where she meets a different version of herself. In the alien dimension, Aldea is questioned by General Grabel about her sighting of Aine with the Zeros HHG on Lemuria, their name for Earth. Commander Reiri receives data that enables Ataraxia to seal the entrances to the alien dimension. The USA Amaterasu led by Scarlet Fairchild, with Gertrude Baird and Sharon Cunningham join the Strategic Defense Academy Ataraxia as part of a joint operation. When Scarlet approaches Kizuna about his powers, this angers Yurishia and they compete for his attention. Scarlet tells of how Yurishia used her to fight a Dragorie then took the credit for the victory. Meanwhile, Aldea and Grabel share a meal and more. Grabel lands on Ataraxia alone, demanding the return of HHG Zeros and its Magitech Knight, Aine. When the Ataraxia forces refuse and attack her, she defeats them all, including Gertrude and Sharon, using her Zoros HHG. The Amaterasu arrive and attack her, but she is too powerful and defeats them all. Grabel gives Aine a chance to leave with her, but Aine does not recognize her. Grabel is now low on power and departs without Aine, vowing to return for her.
8	"Connective Hybrid"; Transliteration: "Konekutibu Haiburiddo -CONNECTIVE HYBRID-" (Japanese: 連結改装 -CONNECTIVE HYBRID-)	23 August 2016
One week later, and Commander Reiri realizes that they must defeat Grabel, but need a new Connective Hybrid to do it - a combination of the Eros HHG and two others. Kizuna suggests Yurishia and Scarlet. The three of them take a bath together and it gets steamy. They watch old video footage of Yurishia and Scarlet when they fought together which rekindles the girls' friendship. The three then achieve a Climax Hybrid together, the Connective Hybrid. Meanwhile Aine has entered the alien dimension and questions Grabel about her origins, but just then, the three Amaterasu appear. Yurishia and Scarlet take on Grabel and Aldea with their increased firepower, but although Aldea is defeated, Grabel is too strong. Kizuna then attacks Grabel with his Immoral Weapon but they are evenly matched until Kizuna adds in the weapons of Yurishia and Scarlet, the Connective Hybrid, and defeats her. Grabel departs with Aldea and Strategic Defense seals the portal entrances. Aine is left wondering who she really is.
9	"Academy Festa -First Live-"; Transliteration: "Gakuen-sai -FIRST LIVE-" (Japanese: 学園祭 -FIRST LIVE-)	30 August 2016
The Amaterasu have now liberated Guam and Okinawa and are drifting towards the Japan mainland and plan to recapture Tokyo. Kizuna explains to the male pupils the process of Heart Hybrids but is dramatically interrupted by an angry and embarrassed Hayuru. Aine is missing but Kizuna appears to be the only one concerned as everyone prepares for the Academy Festa. In the alien dimension, Zelshione interrogates and punishes Grabel for acting alone and not sharing information about the HHG Eros. Aldea's will has been broken and she has become Zelshione's pet. Kizuna eventually finds Aine who is afraid of retrieving more of her past memories. Kizuna overcomes her fears and Heart Hybrids with her but she is frightened by seeing visions of the alien dimension. All activities are interrupted by the appearance of an enemy fleet and the Amaterasu go to confront it. Kizuna recognizes his mother, Nayuta Hida, standing on the deck of a Batlantis battleship.
10	"Eve of the Decisive Battle -Install-"; Transliteration: "Kessen zen'ya -INSTALL-" (Japanese: 決戦前夜 -INSTALL-)	6 September 2016
Kizuna meets a hologram of his mother, Nayuta, on the Batlantis battleship and she explains that she left to conduct research on Batlantis. She disappears and the Amaterasu are confronted by Ragrus and her giant Magitech armour, Demon. Zelshione withdraws the battleship instead of attacking. As part of her plan to retake Tokyo, Reiri asks Kizuna to invite Silvia Silkcut to join the Amaterasu. She agrees and he inserts a core into her. The Ataraxia Academy detaches from the Megafloat system to head for Tokyo but are immediately attacked by Viking type Magitech weapons. Meanwhile the Amaterasu leave Ataraxia for Tokyo. Kizuna lands first to create a diversion, however instead of devastation, he finds people going about their normal daily lives.
11	"Operation Take Back Tokyo -Apocalypse-"; Transliteration: "Tōkyō dakkan sakusen -APOCALYPSE-" (Japanese: 東京奪還作戦 -APOCALYPSE-)	13 September 2016
Nayuta explains to Kizuna that the vision of a normal Tokyo he sees is an illusion which she maintains so that the people's energy can be harvested, converted to magical energy and sent to Batlantis. She plans to expand the system across Japan, then the world. Horrified that this means the death of all humans and the Amaterasu, Kizuna attacks her, but he and the Amaterasu are engaged by Ragrus and the Batlantis battle units. Ragrus and her giant Magitech armour, Demon are too strong and she defeats the Amaterasu, but at the last moment they are saved by Silvia and her Heart Hybrid Gear, Taros. They engage in a titanic battle and Silvia defeats Ragrus, who then angrily explodes Demon creating a huge fireball that threatens to engulf the whole Kanto region. Silvia then releases her Immoral Weapon, Titania, which completely absorbs the energy fireball. With their energy depleted, Reiri dispatches a ballistic-type Bullet Love Room so that Kizuna can replenish the Amaterasu. Kizuna Hybrid Hearts with Hayuru first, and then Aine wants to Climax Hybrid so that she can access her Forbidden Weapon and turn the tide of the battle.
12	"Aine -AINES-"; Transliteration: "Aine -AINES-" (Japanese: アイネ -AINES-)	20 September 2016
Kizuna creates the illusion of a full classroom in the Bullet Love Room for Aine which heightens her excitement as they Hybrid Heart. Outside, Hayuru and Yurishia face Zelshione, Captain of the Batlantis Empire's Royal Guards. As Aine is about to acquire her Immoral Weapon, she fears the power and fails to Climax Hybrid. When they emerge they find Hayuru, Yurishia, and Silvia unconscious and their minds filled with painful memories created by Zelshione. Zelshione starts to probe Aine's mind to find how she acquired the Zeros core. Angered at her callous attitude, Kizuna attacks Zelshione with his Eros core but is not strong enough. His plight awakens the other Amaterasu who provide him with the power to challenge Zelshione, but it is not enough to defeat her. Zelshione forces Aine to attack Kizuna but at the last moment, Aine awakens and releases the Forbidden Weapon, defeating Zelshione, the Magitech fighters and closes the portal to the Batlantis dimension. After the Amaterasu watched the portal close, Grace Synclavia, Empress of the Batlantis Empire, appears and says she finally located her long lost sister, Aine.
OVA–1	"Female Ninja Aine"; Transliteration: "On'na ninja Aine" (Japanese: 女忍者 愛音)	30 September 2016
In ancient Japan, the ninja Aine attempts to assassinate the lord Kizuna, but he defeats her. He then ties her up, strips her, and molests her. Just as she orgasms, she abruptly wakes up in the present, having fallen asleep while reading a ninja manga, and is relieved to know it was just a dream.
OVA–2	"Ataraxia Shop Channel"; Transliteration: "Atarakushia shoppu chan'neru" (Japanese: アタラクシアショップチャンネル)	28 October 2016
Kizuna and Yurishia host a shopping channel. Yurishia models gym clothes and then a swimsuit with various sexy antics, making several people call in to buy them. Afterwards, Silvia is shown eagerly watching the channel.
OVA–3	"Cat cosplay diary" Transliteration: "Neko kosupure nikki" (Japanese: 猫コスプレ日記)	25 November 2016
Inside her room, Hayaru finds several costumes. Despite her embarrassment, she strips to her underwear, puts on cat ears, and then a cat tail by inserting it into her anus, causing her to orgasm. She happily completes her cosplay with a bell collar around her neck and furred bands on her wrists and ankles.
OVA–4	"Bunny girl Reiri"; Transliteration: "Banīgāru Reiri" (Japanese: バニーガール れいり)	21 December 2016
Kizuna waits in a bar, having stolen one half of a heart-shaped jewel. Reiri, wearing a bunny girl outfit, says she stole the other half and invites him to her hotel room. He strips and molests her while searching for her half. When he deduces she hid her half inside her vagina, she invites him for sex. This was a ploy to catch him off guard and she drops him down a trap door, then takes his half of the jewel from his clothes and escapes on a motorcycle.
OVA–5	"Silvia Silkcut install" Transliteration: "Silvia Silkcut no insutōru" (Japanese: シルビア・シルクカットのインストール)	27 January 2017
Expanding on their scene in Episode 10, Kizuna and Silvia perform a Hybrid Heart together and he inserts the vibrator-like core into her vagina. She achieves Climax Hybrid and says she is now a woman.
OVA–6	"Masou Gakuen Spa Voyeur"; Transliteration: "Masō gakuen supa tōsatsu" (Japanese: 魔装学園スパ盗撮)	24 February 2017
Practically all the female characters of the show, including the villains, relax in a hot spring together. The girls of Batlantis say hot springs do not exist in their world, so they would like to study and hopefully recreate them. After several sexy shenanigans, Kizuna appears and the girls all stand up and expose themselves, eager to please him.
