= The Family Circumstances of the Irregular Witch =

Japanese manga series

- First tankōbon volume cover, featuring (from left to right) Phoenix, Alyssa, and Viola

でこぼこ魔女の親子事情 (Dekoboko Majo no Oyako Jijō)
- Genre: Fantasy comedy
- Manga
- Written by: Piroya
- Published by: Flex Comix
- Magazine: Comic Meteor
- Original run: July 3, 2019 – present
- Volumes: 7
- Anime television series
- Directed by: Masahiro Takata
- Written by: Gyro Knuckle
- Music by: Myu
- Studio: A-Real
- Licensed by: Crunchyroll (streaming); SA/SEA: Medialink
- Original network: Tokyo MX, BS Fuji, AT-X
- Original run: October 1, 2023 – December 17, 2023
- Episodes: 12
- icon

The Family Circumstances of the Irregular Witch (Japanese: でこぼこ魔女の親子事情, Hepburn: Dekoboko Majo no Oyako Jijō) is a Japanese manga series written and illustrated by Piroya. It was originally a one-shot published in Flex Comix's Comic Meteor website in July 2018, before being serialized in the same website since July 2019. An anime television series adaptation produced by A-Real aired from October to December 2023.

== Plot ==
A petite-figured witch named Alyssa, who has been living by herself in the forest, finds an abandoned human baby. She decides to raise the baby, naming her Viola. Sixteen years later, Viola has become much taller than her adoptive mother, so much so that people mistakenly believe she is Alyssa's mother. The story follows the unusual daily lives of Alyssa, Viola, and the people around them.

== Characters ==
Alyssa (アリッサ, Arissa)
Voiced by: Aoi Koga
A 207-year-old witch who took it upon herself to raise a baby she found in a forest near her home. She oftentimes dotes on her adopted daughter.
Viola (ビオラ, Biora)
Voiced by: Nana Mizuki
She is the human Alyssa found in the forest near her home. She is very protective of her mother. Due to her appearance, she is occasionally mistaken as Alyssa's mother, not as her daughter.
Phoenix (フェニックス, Fenikkusu)
Voiced by: Takaya Hashi
The wisdom-filled familiar Viola summoned. She refers to him as "Phoen".
Lyra (リラ, Rira)
Voiced by: Romi Park
She manages the prop shop where Viola frequents for her magical stuff. She is very supportive of Alyssa and Viola.
Giriko (ギリコ)
Voiced by: Yō Taichi
One of Alyssa's witch friends who likes snakes as familiars.
Luna (ルーナ, Rūna)
Voiced by: Akira Sekine
Another of Alyssa's witch friends who has a fetishistic taste in familiars.
Fennel (フェンネル, Fenneru)
Voiced by: Takayuki Kondo
He is the leading customer of Alyssa's dried herbs and medicinal plants who has a crush on her. Viola does everything to thwart him.
Grinde (グリンド, Gurindo)
Voiced by: Daisuke Ono
One of Fennel's ogre friends who, like him, is single and looking for a girlfriend.
Pond (ポンド, Pondo)
Voiced by: Katsuyuki Konishi
He is Lyra's husband who has a knack for growing unusual plants in his garden.
Auri (アウリ)
Voiced by: Junichi Suwabe
Alyssa's father, making him Viola's adopted grandfather. He has rather a "storied" past. He even hit on Viola unaware that she is his granddaughter.
Doku-Koala (毒コアラ, Doku-Koara)
Voiced by: Ikue Ōtani
The violent summoned creature which is a handful for Phoenix to handle.
Narrator (ナレーション, Narēshon)
Voiced by: Kana Hanazawa

== Media ==
=== Manga ===
Written and illustrated by Piroya, The Family Circumstances of the Irregular Witch was initially a one-shot published in Flex Comix's Comic Meteor website on July 11, 2018. It began serialization in the same website on July 3, 2019. As of March 2026, seven tankōbon volumes have been released.

==== Volumes ====
| No. | Japanese release date | Japanese ISBN |
|---|---|---|
| 1 | May 12, 2020 | 978-4-86-675105-4 |
Chapters 1–8
| 2 | February 12, 2021 | 978-4-86-675138-2 |
Chapters 9–14; Bangai-hen 1 (番外編①); Bangai-hen 2 (番外編②)
| 3 | November 12, 2021 | 978-4-86-675176-4 |
Chapters 15–21; Bangai-hen 3 (番外編③); Bangai-hen 4 (番外編④)
| 4 | September 12, 2022 | 978-4-86-675239-6 |
Chapters 22–27; Bangai-hen 5 (番外編⑤)
| 5 | April 12, 2023 | 978-4-86-675279-2 |
Chapters 28–33; Bangai-hen 6 (番外編⑥); Bangai-hen 7 (番外編⑦); Bangai-hen 8 (番外編⑧)
| 6 | October 12, 2023 | 978-4-86-675316-4 |
Chapters 34–39; Bangai-hen 9 (番外編⑨); Bangai-hen 10 (番外編⑩)
| 7 | March 13, 2026 | 978-4-86-675490-1 |
Chapters 40–47; Bangai-hen 11 (番外編⑪); Bangai-hen 12 (番外編⑫)

=== Anime ===
In September 2022, it was announced that the manga would be adapted into an anime television series. It was produced by A-Real and directed by Masahiro Takata, who also served as sound director, with scripts written by Gyro Knuckle, character designs by Miwa Yoshida, and music composed by Myu. The series aired from October 1 to December 17, 2023, on Tokyo MX and other networks. The opening theme song, "Sugar Doughnuts", was performed by Nana Mizuki, while the ending theme song, "Welcome!", was performed by angela. Crunchyroll streamed the series. Medialink licensed the series in Central, South and Southeast Asia, and streams on its Ani-One Asia YouTube channel.

==== Episodes ====
| No. | Title (Note: All English titles are taken from Crunchyroll.) | Directed by | Written by | Storyboarded by | Original release date |
|---|---|---|---|---|---|
| 1 | "The Irregular Circumstances of the Close-Knit Family"; Transliteration: "Nakayoshi Oyako no Dekoboko Jijō" (Japanese: なかよし親子のでこぼこ事情) | Masahiro Takata | Gyro Knuckle | Masahiro Takata | October 1, 2023 |
| 1 | "The Educational Circumstances of the Mysterious Life Form"; Transliteration: "Fushigi na Inochi no Kyōiku Jijō" (Japanese: 不思議な命の教育事情) | Masahiro Takata | Gyro Knuckle | Masahiro Takata | October 1, 2023 |
207-year-old witch Alyssa finds an abandoned human baby and raises her as her daughter named Viola. 16 years later, Viola becomes so tall and buxom that people mistake her for being Alyssa's mother. Alyssa worries Viola might become a rebellious teen and considers becoming strict, but due to her doting nature decides against it. Men are drawn to Viola but she believes they are lusting for Alyssa and scares them away. Viola later summons a phoenix as a pet. Alyssa worries Viola might start dating, but not only is Viola uninterested she plans to stop Alyssa from dating too, even summoning a golem to keep men away. Viola decides to get a familiar but cannot decide what kind; while Alyssa does not have one, Viola's honorary aunts Giriko and Luna have a snake and a harem of masochistic men, respectively. As familiars take a lot of responsibility, Viola decides to raise a flower first as practice. Phoenix, pouting over them wasting his time, becomes Viola's familiar anyway and develops a rivalry with the flower. Alyssa becomes fond of Phoenix as he acts more like a cat than a bird.
| 2 | "The Commonplace Circumstances of the Witch's Child-Rearing"; Transliteration: "Majo no Ikuji no Aruaru Jijō" (Japanese: 魔女の育児のあるある事情) | Marie Watanabe | Gyro Knuckle | Yasushi Muroya | October 8, 2023 (Note: From Episode 2 onward, episodes were released on select platforms, such as D Anime Store and Crunchyroll, a week before their air dates on television.) |
| 2 | "The Romantic Circumstances of the Little Brother Position"; Transliteration: "Otōto Pojishon no Ren'ai Jijō" (Japanese: 弟ポジションの恋愛事情) | Marie Watanabe | Gyro Knuckle | Yasushi Muroya | October 8, 2023 |
Viola asks her honorary aunt Lira for the poison to defeat her enemies, causing Lira to fondly remember Viola as a baby. Viola had a lot of magic for a human so Alyssa knew she had to raise her, but it was Lira who breastfed her. As they were both first-time parents, Lira kept Alyssa from overthinking herself into panic attacks while Alyssa stopped Lira from going overboard with enthusiasm. Seeing Alyssa and Viola now makes Lira wonder about her son, a rebellious teenager often in need of punishment. An elf merchant named Fennel has a crush on Alyssa and is thus the enemy Viola tries to poison. Alyssa is oblivious to his feelings and treats Fennel like a younger brother. Fennel is determined to escape this but is prevented by his cowardice and by Viola sending Phoenix to "accidentally" set him on fire at inopportune moments. Fennel plans to somehow co-exist with Viola but on his next visit is tricked into playing a rigged carnival game, with the prize being an illicit photograph of Alyssa. He later realizes how rigged the game was.
| 3 | "The Reminiscing Circumstances of the Witch-Girl Time Crew"; Transliteration: "Majoshikai no Tsuikai Jijō" (Japanese: 魔女子会の追懐事情) | Kazuya Kitō | Masahiro Takata | Tomoe Makino; Rin Ichikawa | October 15, 2023 |
| 3 | "The Sniffly Circumstances of the Healthy Daughter"; Transliteration: "Genki Musume no Kaze Jijō" (Japanese: 元気娘の風邪事情) | Kazuya Kitō | Masahiro Takata | Tomoe Makino; Rin Ichikawa | October 15, 2023 |
Giriko and Luna visit with a magic photo album that displays memories, allowing Viola to see them as children. Viola sees they allowed their childhood hobbies of gardening, tarot cards, and crafting to become their careers of herbalist, fortune teller, and magic item engineer. Viola wonders what her career could be since her only hobbies are Alyssa and birds. However, when she accidentally sees memories of Luna's masochist harem, Luna and Giriko flee before Alyssa can punish them. Viola catches a cold. Phoenix offers his immortal body to make chicken soup, an idea Alyssa swiftly rejects. Viola refuses to sleep knowing from experience a fever gives her nightmares that manifest in the real world, causing trouble for Alyssa. She also begins ex-spelling, a process where ill witches vomit pure magic. However, it is sweet-smelling and evaporates cleanly. Phoenix eventually puts her to sleep to recover. Viola dreams of her birth mother but forgets as soon as she awakens. Viola recovers but Phoenix catches a cold through his familiar contract with Viola. Alyssa remembers when Viola was 6, she summoned a water spirit in her sleep, leading to her fascination with animals and summoning magic.
| 4 | "The Requesting Circumstances of the Late-Blooming Orc"; Transliteration: "Okute na Ōku no Onegai Jijō" (Japanese: 奥手なオークのお願い事情) | Daisuke Kurose | Gyro Knuckle | Atsuto Masuda | October 22, 2023 |
| 4 | "The Monitoring Circumstances of the Egg and Big Sister"; Transliteration: "Tamago to Onēsan no Azukari Jijō" (Japanese: 卵とお姉さんの預かり事情) | Daisuke Kurose | Gyro Knuckle | Atsuto Masuda | October 22, 2023 |
Glind, an orcish craftsman, asks Fennel's help in finding a girlfriend. Fennel arranges a blind date with Viola, who agrees but makes Fennel suffer first. As her obsession with Alyssa comes first, she decides she and Glind can only ever be friends. Fennel pushes Glind to not give up, selfishly hoping if Viola takes a lover, he can get closer to Alyssa. Viola overhears this and feeds Fennel to an elf-eating monster. Glind worries Viola is too scary to date. Alyssa agrees to babysit an egg belonging to the Lizardkin couple Gita and Malak. Phoenix elects not to be involved since egg-laying species are sensitive about who can touch their eggs, so he instructs Viola to do her best as a big sister. Since unhatched babies do not require feeding or cleaning, Viola settles for talking to them. The parents return with a gift, an ostrich egg boiled in a hot spring, a sort of traditional Lizardkin joke. Alyssa invites Fennel to supper, but his romantic dreams are dashed when he falls into Viola's teleportation trap and is fed to the elf-eating monster as revenge for the blind date.
| 5 | "The Classified Circumstances of the Elfin Forest"; Transliteration: "Erufu no Mori no Hikōkai Jijō" (Japanese: エルフの森の非公開事情) | Naoki Murata | Gyro Knuckle | Hiroaki Yoshikawa | October 29, 2023 |
| 5 | "The Potato-Digging Circumstances of Love and Legend"; Transliteration: "Ai to Densetsu no Imohori Jijō" (Japanese: 愛と伝説の芋掘り事情) | Naoki Murata | Gyro Knuckle | Hiroaki Yoshikawa | October 29, 2023 |
Fennel visits Alyssa alone while Vola is out, but finds Glind there on Viola's orders to foil Fennel's romantic plans. Glind is enamored of the elves' village, said to be populated by beautiful elf maidens with new magic and excellent archers. Fennel reveals the place is actually so boring young elves leave as soon as they can. Those who stay are the elderly obsessed with making potions, and archery is about the only available hobby. Feeling nostalgic for home, Fennel asks Alyssa to visit it with him. However, his invitation is ruined when Viola overhears this. Alyssa and Viola assist Pondo, Lira's husband, in harvesting sweet potatoes, which have come alive since he used one of Giriko's potions to grow them faster. Pondo wants it kept secret from Lira since the potatoes are rapidly evolving in humorous but deeply worrying magical ways. Lira finds out anyway and after punishing Pondo, Giriko returns the fields to normal. Several days later, Alyssa discovers Viola used a similar potion in their garden, resulting in giant potatoes fighting each other for dominance. After they destroy the garden, Giriko eventually fixes everything.
| 6 | "The Assemblage Circumstances of the Rose Garden"; Transliteration: "Baraen no Oshiriai Jijō" (Japanese: 薔薇園のおしりあい事情) | Marie Watanabe | Masahiro Takata | Masahiro Takata | November 5, 2023 |
Alyssa and Viola are visited by Hip the fairy, who asks them to stop his brother, Sweet Cheeks. At the home of the noble Anna, the flowers in the garden have stopped growing due to Sweet Cheeks. When confronted, Sweet Cheeks reveals that he believes Anna's fiancé, Torino, is only using her for her money and is doing his best to stop the wedding. While spying on Torino, Viola discovers that despite his playboy appearance, he is actually a very nice person. Viola later scolds Sweet Cheeks for misjudging Torino and insists he apologizes to Anna. However, normal humans like Anna cannot see fairies so she has no idea Sweet Cheeks even exists. Phoenix reveals he has a spell that will allow Sweet Cheeks to be visible, but after learning Anna believes her father's spirit lives in the garden, Sweet Cheeks chooses not to ruin this by revealing himself. He restores the flowers so Anna will believe her father's spirit approves of Torino, and thanks everyone for helping him let Anna go. Alyssa is saddened because as a witch, she will one day outlive Viola and have to say goodbye.
| 7 | "The Circumstances of Yep—Oops—Of Course These Are Pastries!"; Transliteration: "Un, Kore wa Yakigashi da yo!? To Iu Jijō" (Japanese: うん、これは焼き菓子だよ!?という事情) | Kazuya Kitō | Masahiro Takata | Mie Ōishi | November 12, 2023 |
| 7 | "The Insomnia Circumstances of the Sleep Fairy"; Transliteration: "Nemuri no Sei no Fumin Jijō" (Japanese: 眠りの精の不眠事情) | Kazuya Kitō | Masahiro Takata | Mie Ōishi | November 12, 2023 |
Viola takes up baking but her snake cookies all end up looking like giant poops. Alyssa tries to help by baking new ones in different colors, but the effect goes from disgusting to comical. Since they do taste delicious, everyone eats them anyway to not upset Viola. Alyssa recalls a childhood bedtime story of the Sandman. Viola reveals Sandman is a real fairy who coincidentally has just crashed through her window due to falling asleep while flying. Sandman has recently been struggling to sleep ever since his wife left him, plus he is getting older with aching joints. Viola offers one of Phoenix's healing spells, but Sandman is too scared of Phoenix. Alyssa offers hot milk but Sandman rejects this as hot milk is used by another sleep fairy, Ole Lukøje, whom Sandman does not get along with. They decide to take him to a real doctor for treatment, plus he decides to try to talk to his wife. For their help, he gifts Alyssa a bottle of his sleeping sand. Giriko insists on buying it, but as it is worth millions, Alyssa is unable to sleep for a week due to her worrying about thieves and burglars.
| 8 | "The Cooking Circumstances of the Cursed Witch"; Transliteration: "Noroware Majo no Oryōri Jijō" (Japanese: 呪われ魔女のお料理事情) | Daisuke Kurose | Takanori Yamaura | Daisuke Kurose | November 19, 2023 |
| 8 | "The Crazed Circumstances of the Phoenix's Exam"; Transliteration: "Kyōki no Fushichō no Shinsatsu Jijō" (Japanese: 狂気の不死鳥の診察事情) | Daisuke Kurose | Takanori Yamaura | Daisuke Kurose | November 19, 2023 |
| 8 | "Irregular Fairy Tale Theater"; Transliteration: "Dekoboko Dōwa Gekijō" (Japanese: でこぼこ童話劇場) | Daisuke Kurose | Takanori Yamaura | Daisuke Kurose | November 19, 2023 |
Luna asks Alyssa for cooking lessons, which Alyssa refuses due to the danger. As the magical price of her powerful fortune telling, everything Luna cooks is either surreal or a disaster. Being immortal, Phoenix volunteers as food taster and explosively transforms into a chicken version of himself. As compensation, Luna shares her prediction a certain someone will soon visit, which terrifies Alyssa. A week later, Phoenix is still a chicken so Alyssa and Viola take him to see nurse sisters Sheeta and Kicla. Kicla is a mad scientist researcher who, having never seen a phoenix before, is determined to dissect him. Sheeta gets her under control allowing the doctor to examine him, who determines Phoenix has been constipated since eating Luna's food. After successfully going to the bathroom, Phoenix returns to normal. A series of short sketches of popular fairy tales is shown with everyone playing different roles. Sketches include Alyssa White, The Golden Axe, the Silver Axe and the Third Ack, Orc and the Beanstalk, The Little Musclemaid, Alyssa Riding Hood, and due to a disagreement between Viola and Fennel, Alyssa Riding Hood Take 2.
| 9 | "The Personal Circumstances of the Nervous Mama"; Transliteration: "Dokidoki Mama no Kojin Jijō" (Japanese: どきどきママの個人事情) | Yasushi Muroya | Gyro Knuckle | Yasushi Muroya | November 26, 2023 |
| 9 | "The Family Circumstances of the Questionable Visitor"; Transliteration: "Fushin na Kyaku no Gokatei Jijō" (Japanese: 不審な客のご家庭事情) | Yasushi Muroya | Gyro Knuckle | Yasushi Muroya | November 26, 2023 |
Viola notices Alyssa is not herself following news of the upcoming visitor but neither Giriko, Luna, or Lira will tell her. At Lira's shop, Viola encounters a handsome, playboy sorcerer looking for Alyssa. He flirts with Viola shamelessly until Lira punishes him and Viola secretly poisons him with laxatives. Viola reveals Alyssa is her mother, causing the shocked sorcerer to reveal he is Auri, Alyssa's father, who was unaware he had a granddaughter. Alyssa arrives and Auri settles down after realizing Alyssa adopted Viola and is still unmarried. Alyssa claims she kept Viola secret so as not to expose her to Auri until she was old enough to resist being influenced by his irresponsibility and bad behavior. Alyssa reveals Auri is technically her uncle, her mother's brother, who co-parented her as a father figure. She allows him to stay one night until Lira reveals he had flirted with Viola, so Alyssa throws him out. Alyssa reveals her mother did happily visit Viola once as a baby. As the laxatives kick in, causing Auri to have to leave quickly, he cannot shake the feeling he has seen a similar face to Viola somewhere many years before.
| 10 | "The Troubled Circumstances of the Confined Son"; Transliteration: "O Komori Musuko no O Nayami Jijō" (Japanese: おこもり息子のお悩み事情) | Hidetoshi Aridome | Gyro Knuckle; Takanori Yamaura | Rin Ichikawa | December 3, 2023 |
| 10 | "The Public Park Circumstances of Heart vs. Tongue"; Transliteration: "Honne to Tatemae no Kōen Jijō" (Japanese: 本音と建前の公園事情) | Hidetoshi Aridome | Gyro Knuckle; Takanori Yamaura | Rin Ichikawa | December 3, 2023 |
Lira and Pondo's son refuses to leave his room. Worried Lira will find out, Pondo enlists Viola's help. He eventually admits he was too embarrassed by his messy hair to be seen in public. Stunned by such a stupid reason, Viola fetches Lira. Later from his hospital bed, he admits he did not want Viola specifically to see him, suggesting he has a crush on her, to Pondo's delight. Meanwhile, the oblivious Viola brews a potion to cure messy hair. Gita's egg hatches so everyone goes to the park so Gita can make friends with other new mothers. There, Lira encounters Lady, her childhood enemy. This was caused by Lady's tsundere personality as she has secretly wanted to be Lira's friend since they first met. She impulsively challenges Gita to a park debut contest with her friend Birdy, who is also a first-time mother. After speaking with as many parents as possible, Alyssa declares the contest a tie and forces both sides to apologize, hinting she figured out Lady's tsundere personality. However, Lady panics and slaps away Lira's offered handshake. She then runs away, leaving everyone feeling that making friends might be harder than they thought.
| 11 | "The Home Alone Circumstances of the Familiars"; Transliteration: "Tsukai Matachi no O Rusuban Jijō" (Japanese: 使い魔たちのお留守番事情) | Marie Watanabe | Gyro Knuckle; Takanori Yamaura | Takashi Iida | December 10, 2023 |
| 11 | "The Weight Loss Circumstances of Corpulent Phoenix"; Transliteration: "Hidaina Fushichō no Genryō Jijō" (Japanese: 肥大な不死鳥の減量事情) | Marie Watanabe | Gyro Knuckle; Takanori Yamaura | Takashi Iida | December 10, 2023 |
| 11 | "The Romantic Advice Circumstances of the Men without Dates"; Transliteration: "Zaru Otokotachi no Renai Sōdan Jijō" (Japanese: モテざる男たちの恋愛相談事情) | Marie Watanabe | Gyro Knuckle; Takanori Yamaura | Takashi Iida | December 10, 2023 |
Alyssa and Viola go shopping, leaving Phoenix in charge of Viola's other familiar, Toxic Koala. In Viola's absence, Toxic Koala becomes wantonly destructive, completely destroying the house in a tantrum against Phoenix's orders as senior familiar. Alyssa and Viola return and blame Phoenix for not controlling his junior familiar. Outraged at this injustice, Phoenix quits as senior and throws his own tantrum. Phoenix overindulges and becomes fat. Kicla's suggestion she surgically remove his excess flesh for scientific study is rejected. Instead, she creates a sensible diet and exercise program for him. One month later, Phoenix loses so much weight he shrinks to the size of a robin, requiring Alyssa and Viola to fatten him back up to his normal size. Desperate for romantic advice, Fennel and Glind pay the fine to free Auri from prison after he was caught cheating at a casino. Auri claims his skill with the ladies is his empathy, having once been turned into a woman for two weeks by his sister. He therefore decides to turn them both into women, despite their protests. Alyssa overhears the commotion and sets Toxic Koala on Auri as a punishment for his lechery.
| 12 | "The Family Circumstances of the Irregular Witch"; Transliteration: "Dekoboko Majo no Oyako Jijō" (Japanese: でこぼこ魔女の親子事情) | Masahiro Takata | Masahiro Takata | Masahiro Takata | December 17, 2023 |
Auri complains about Viola being kept secret for 16 years by Alyssa, Luna, Giriko, Glind and Fennel. Viola is surprised Auri is fine with Fennel being in love with Alyssa, though Auri admits this is only because Fennel has zero chance of seducing Alyssa. Despite feeling slightly guilty, Alyssa blames Auri for staying away so long waiting for an arrest warrant to expire after seducing another man's wife. Viola expresses interest in meeting her grandmother, though Alyssa explains she is mysterious, and impossible to keep track of. She met Viola once as a baby and reassured Alyssa she would be a good mother. Luna and Giriko try to cheer Auri up with Viola's baby pictures and funny stories, but this worsens his mood, so he bullies Fennel. Fennel can only recall stories of Viola causing him pain and suffering. Auri recalls Alyssa struggled to learn magic as a child and fell ill frequently but acted mature for her age. Phoenix does not understand the problems everyone is discussing, since to him everyone seems like a child. After everyone leaves, Alyssa and Viola go shopping as normal and Alyssa is exasperated people still mistake Viola as being her mother.

== Reception ==
In 2020, the manga was among 50 nominees for the 6th Next Manga Awards in the web category.
