= Princess Principal =

Japanese anime series and its franchise

- Promotional image.

プリンセス・プリンシパル (Purinsesu Prinshiparu)
- Genre: Action, spy, steampunk
- Anime television series
- Directed by: Masaki Tachibana
- Produced by: Ryoya Arisawa; Kazuyoshi Nishikawa; Tomoyo Ueji; Hirotaka Kaneko; Takeshi Ishigaki; Takumi Ito
- Written by: Ichirō Ōkouchi
- Music by: Yuki Kajiura
- Studio: Studio 3Hz; Actas
- Licensed by: AUS: Madman Entertainment; NA: Sentai Filmworks; UK: MVM Films; SA/SEA: Medialink
- Original network: Tokyo MX, KBS, SUN, BS11, AT-X
- English network: SEA: Animax Asia
- Original run: July 9, 2017 – September 24, 2017
- Episodes: 12
- Manga
- Written by: Ryou Akizuki
- Published by: Tokuma Shoten
- Imprint: Ryū Comics
- Magazine: Monthly Comic Ryū
- Original run: November 8, 2019 – present
- Volumes: 1
- Anime film series
- Princess Principal: Crown Handler (2021–present)

Princess Principal (Japanese: プリンセス・プリンシパル, Hepburn: Purinsesu Purinshiparu) is a Japanese anime television series produced by Studio 3Hz and Actas. The series was directed by Masaki Tachibana and written by Ichirō Ōkouchi, with original character designs by Kouhaku Kuroboshi and Yukie Akiya, and music by Yuki Kajiura. It was also partly inspired by the American novel The Prince and the Pauper.

Set in a 20th-century alternate reality of England, the series follows five young girls enrolled in Queen Mayfair's school serve as undercover spies, working for the Commonwealth to overthrow the Kingdom, which divided London into two.

The series aired from July to September 2017. The first three installments of a six-part sequel film series Princess Principal: Crown Handler have also been released. A mobile game, Princess Principal: Game of Mission, was launched in August 2017, and was available until December 28, 2018.

== Plot ==
Princess Principal is set in a fictional analogue of Britain called Albion. During the early 20th century, the Kingdom of Albion monopolized a mysterious substance called "Cavorite" to construct a fleet of heavily armed airships that made Albion the dominant power in the world. However, the proletariat of Albion grew angry at their country's ruling class for largely ignoring their plight, sparking the "London Revolution" in which the lower classes attempted to overthrow the royal family. Eventually, the two sides reached a stalemate, and a great wall was erected through the middle of London, splitting Albion into two nations: the Commonwealth and the Kingdom.

Several years later, the Commonwealth launches "Operation Changeling", a plan to replace the Kingdom's Princess Charlotte with Ange, a girl who bears a strong resemblance to her, in order to have a highly placed agent within the royal family. However, the Princess turns the plan on the spies, offering to work with the Commonwealth if Ange and her friends will help her become the Queen of the Kingdom. So begins the story as five girls, including the Princess herself, serve as undercover spies in the Kingdom working for the Commonwealth, while enrolled as students at the prestigious Queen's Mayfair school.

== Characters ==
=== Main characters ===
Ange (アンジェ, Anje)
Voiced by: Ayaka Imamura (series), Aoi Koga (films) (Japanese); Avery Smithhart (English)
The main protagonist and a 17-year-old spymaster who can change her personality almost at whim to whatever is required for her mission. She is adept at both telling and detecting lies, often hiding her true knowledge as tales from the "Black Lizard Planet." She also possesses stolen prototype Cavorite technology that allows her to increase or decrease the gravity of herself and anything she touches when active. It is later revealed that she was born as the true princess of Albion. Because of the revolution, she was stuck with her current persona while her lookalike took her place in the castle. Her sidearm of choice is a Webley–Fosbery Automatic Revolver.
Princess Charlotte (プリンセス・シャーロット, Purinsesu Shārotto)
Voiced by: Akira Sekine (Japanese); Patricia Duran (English)
Like Ange, Princess Charlotte is 17-years-old. She is the niece of the Duke of Normandy and fourth in the line of succession for the throne of the Albion Kingdom. The Princess has a relatively calm and disarming demeanor, and easily gets along well with others. Her dream is to become Queen and re-unify the country. Her grandmother, the Queen, bears a very close resemblance to Queen Victoria in the latter part of her reign. It is revealed later on that she is the real Ange who befriended the princess and like the princess got stuck in her assumed identity because of the revolution. Her sidearm of choice is a Schönberger-Laumann 1892.
Dorothy (ドロシー, Doroshī)
Voiced by: Yō Taichi (Japanese); Elizabeth Bunch (English)
A 20-year-old undercover student who loves drinking wine and booze, even though her teammates are too young to do so. She also has a bright personality. Dorothy uses her feminine charm in missions and is good at shooting and driving vehicles. Her real name is Daisy MacBean; she changed her name and fled after her mother died and her father constantly abused her in a drunken rage. "Dorothy" is her mother's name. Her sidearm of choice is possibly a revolver that chambered in .410 bore.
Beatrice (ベアトリス, Beatorisu)
Voiced by: Akari Kageyama (Japanese); Shanae'a Moore (English)
The 15-year-old scion of a prestigious family who serves as the Princess' aide and close friend. She can mimic the voices of other people using a mechanism that her father implanted in her throat, after he treated her as a test subject for his experiments.
Chise Tōdō (藤堂 ちせ, Tōdō Chise) (Note: Her family name is Tōdō.)
Voiced by: Nozomi Furuki (Japanese); Rachael Messer (English)
A 16-year-old exchange student from Saga, Japan, who originally joined the team to protect a Japanese diplomat from an assassin who was related to her. She is highly proficient in samurai-style swordsmanship and is considered the strongest of the spies in melee combat. She often acts naive and has a hard time adapting to the culture differences. She is a spy for Japan tasked with observing the Commonwealth and Kingdom so that her superiors can determine which country to ally with.

=== Supporting characters ===
L (エル, Eru)
Voiced by: Takayuki Sugō (Japanese); David Wald (English)
The head of Control, the intelligence unit handling Principal Team.
7 (セブン, Sebun)
Voiced by: Miyuki Sawashiro (Japanese); Heidi Hinkle (English)
A member of Control, the intelligence unit handling Principal Team.
The Colonel (大佐, Taisa)
Voiced by: Takumi Yamazaki (Japanese); Chris Hutchison (English)
A member of Control and the Commonwealth military's representative.
The Duke of Normandy (ノルマンディー公, Norumandī Kō)
Voiced by: Takaya Hashi (Japanese); Jay Hickman (English)
The Home Secretary of the Albion Kingdom and Princess Charlotte's uncle. He handles the Kingdom's espionage affairs and personally has hunted down potential defectors from the Kingdom, either to use them for counter-espionage against the Commonwealth's agents or kill them outright.
Gazelle (ガゼル, Gazeru)
Voiced by: Yuko Iida (Japanese); Melanie Burke (English)
One of the Duke of Normandy's most-trusted agents, a dark-skinned woman who collects information and can kill anyone who poses a threat to her employer.

== Media ==
=== Anime ===
The anime series is animated by Studio 3Hz and Actas. The series is directed by Masaki Tachibana, with scripts written by Ichirō Ōkouchi and character designs by Kouhaku Kuroboshi and Yukie Akiya. The series aired from July 9 to September 24, 2017. The opening theme song is "The Other Side of the Wall" performed by Void_Chords featuring MARU, and the ending theme is "A Page of My Story" performed by Ange (Ayaka Imamura), Princess Charlotte (Akira Sekine), Dorothy (Yō Taichi), Beatrice (Akari Kageyama), and Chise Tōdō (Nozomi Furuki).

The series was released on home video in Japan on September 27, 2017, in both DVD and Blu-ray formats.

==== English release and international distribution ====
Sentai Filmworks has licensed the anime and streamed on its Hidive service in North America, UK and Australia along with Amazon Prime Video in the U.S., Crunchyroll in selected regions and other streaming sites elsewhere. Princess Principal received an English dub, directed by Kyle C. Jones, debuted on Hidive on September 21, 2018, and was released on Blu-ray by Section23 Films in North America on September 25, 2018. MVM Films has licensed the series in the UK and was released on home video on November 13, 2018. In Australia, the series is also distributed by Madman Entertainment and was released on DVD/Blu-ray on December 5, 2018.

Medialink licensed the series in South Asia and Southeast Asia and is streaming it on Ani-One Asia YouTube channel.

==== Episode list ====
The series aired in an anachronical order, represented by each episode's "case" number.

Notes: A = episode number, C = chronological order.

Release order	Chronological order	Title (Note: All English titles are taken from Amazon Video.)	Original release date
1	6	"Case 13 Wired Liar"	July 9, 2017
Eric, a scientist, seeks to defect to the Commonwealth. Ange and her fellow spies Dorothy, Beatrice, Chise, and Princess smuggle him to safety inside the Queen's Mayfair School, a prestigious academy where they are posing as students. However, Eric also requests that they bring his little sister Amy as well. Ange and Beatrice go to investigate Amy, and discover that she is suffering from Cavorite poisoning, which requires an expensive procedure to cure. However, after observing several clues and Eric's odd behavior, Ange concludes that Eric is in fact a double agent meant to lure them out into the open. Her suspicions are confirmed when Eric attempts to send a carrier pigeon to his handler. Dorothy, Beatrice, and Chise capture Eric's handler while Ange takes Eric to a secluded park, where she exposes his plan. Eric admits he was approached by the Duke of Normandy, who said Amy's operation would be funded if in return Eric agreed to fake his defection. Ange has Eric sign a life insurance policy before executing him. A week later, Eric's body is found and the money from the insurance policy is used to pay for Amy's operation.
2	1	"Case 1 Dancy Conspiracy"	July 16, 2017
In the past, Ange begins attending Queen's Mayfair school as a transfer student. Ange links up with fellow agent Dorothy; their primary mission is to secretly replace the Princess with Ange. That night, Ange and Dorothy attend a ball at the school and are given an impromptu mission to keep a key away from the Duke of Normandy. Dorothy approaches Morgan, who is in possession of the key, but is turned away by his bodyguards. Ange then goes over to the Princess to befriend her, while "accidentally" spilling a "drink" on her dress. While Princess waits for a new dress, Ange impersonates her to get the key from Morgan. However, Princess is already aware that Ange and Dorothy are spies, and offers to work with them if they help her become Queen of the Kingdom. Ange signals to her handlers to ring a nearby church bell if they accept Princess's terms. The Duke of Normandy realizes the key has been taken from Morgan and orders a search of everyone at the party. As he approaches Ange, the bell tower chimes, distracting the Duke and sealing Ange's bargain with Princess. Princess uses the diversion to secretly take the key from Ange and then excuses herself from the ballroom. The next day, Ange and Princess meet on the roof of the school, revealing that Ange was the one who tipped Princess off to her identity as a spy. It is also revealed that Ange's real name is Charlotte and Princess' real name is Ange, and that both girls had known each other ten years ago.
3	2	"Case 2 Vice Voice"	July 23, 2017
It is revealed that Ange became a spy so she could cross the wall and reunite with Princess and smuggle her out of the country. However, Princess tells her that her desire to be Queen was genuine, as she wants to tear down the London Wall and create a world where they both can live together without having to hide. Ange agrees to carry out her wish. Ange and Dorothy then receive a mission to board HMS Gloucester and recover stolen printing plates. They decide to use Princess as way to board the ship, though Beatrice protests her participation in the mission. However, Beatrice's voice becomes odd as she shouts, and she flees in embarrassment. Princess reveals that Beatrice had been experimented upon by her father, and her vocal cords were replaced by machinery. With Princess and Dorothy's help, Ange manages to sneak onto the airship, with Beatrice inadvertently following her. Ange assaults the agent transporting the plates but is injured and insists that Beatrice take the plates and leave her behind. Beatrice instead uses her mechanical voice-box to impersonate the agent's voice and call off the guards, giving her and Ange the time to escape together. Realizing that Ange cares as much for Princess as she does, Beatrice decides to join the spy team.
4	4	"Case 9 Roaming Pigeons"	July 30, 2017
Dorothy is given a new mission by L to steal a prototype miniature Cavorite device the Kingdom has developed. L also warns Dorothy to keep an eye on Princess, as she might be a double agent. Meanwhile, Ange is training Beatrice and Chise when Princess suggests they come up with a name for their team. Dorothy informs them of their mission and they use Princess' status to infiltrate a ceremony at the mine where the Cavorite device is being held. At the ceremony, it is revealed that Chise is there to observe the Kingdom and Commonwealth on the behalf of Japan so it can determine which country to ally with, and the Duke of Normandy wants to marry Princess off to Russia to secure an alliance. Ange searches for the device but finds out it is being transported out of the city by boat. Princess volunteers to assist in the assault on the boat, which convinces Dorothy that she is not a double agent. The team is able to secure the Cavorite device and capture the entire research team. Dorothy relays the results to L, but he warns her that even though Princess may not be a double agent, she will always be a potential threat. At school, the team decides to name themselves Team White Pigeon.
5	3	"Case 7 Bullet & Blade's Ballad"	August 6, 2017
Princess welcomes a Japanese delegation led by Lord Horikawa to negotiate a treaty with the Queen, despite the knowledge that he is being targeted by the famed assassin Tōdō Jūbei. During the train ride to London, a stranger boards the train and Ange and Dorothy confront her, only to find out the stranger is Chise, one of Lord Horikawa's bodyguards who has a personal grudge against Jūbei. Princess has Ange partner up with Chise to get the pair to trust each other more, and Chise reveals she wants to defeat Jūbei since he killed her father. Meanwhile, the Duke of Normandy is secretly working with Jūbei in the hopes that Princess will be caught up in the assassination attempt, since he does not want to risk her ascending the throne. Jūbei and his assassins then attack the train, though Ange and Chise are able to fight them off. Princess and Ange work together to stop the train to prevent a collision with another train, while Chise duels with Jūbei. Chise emerges the victor by killing Jūbei, and Ange deduces that Jūbei was Chise's father. Afterwards, Dorothy introduces Lord Horikawa to Control, and Chise joins the spy team as a new transfer student.
6	8	"Case 18 Rouge Morgue"	August 13, 2017
Dorothy is given a mission by Control to infiltrate London's morgue and recover a code cipher hidden in the body of a deceased Kingdom agent. Dorothy asks why she was chosen specifically, and it is revealed that the man tasked by the Duke of Normandy to find the agent's body is Danny MacBean, Dorothy's father. Dorothy (whose real name is revealed to be Daisy), has a tense reunion with her father, who has become an angry and unpleasant man due to the loss of his right hand. She confides to Beatrice that Danny used to be brilliant steam engineer before losing his hand in an accident, and began taking out his anger on everybody around him, including Dorothy, which caused her to run away from home. In a drunken stupor, Danny tells Dorothy how to find the body. She and Beatrice find the body and copy the cipher both so the Duke of Normandy won't be aware of its theft and so that Danny can pay off the loan sharks. While Danny goes to deliver the cipher, the loan sharks attempt to kidnap Dorothy and Beatrice but are easily defeated by Dorothy, and she finds out how far her father was willing to go to protect her from the loan sharks. Meanwhile, Danny attempts to negotiate more money from Gazelle to give to Dorothy, but is killed instead. As Danny's body is taken to the morgue, Dorothy and Beatrice wait for him at his favorite pub.
7	7	"Case 16 Loudly Laundry"	August 20, 2017
The team is tasked with tracking down a serial killer dubbed "Poison Gas Jack", who is using nerve gas to assassinate people who are sympathetic to the Commonwealth. They surmise that the killer is a soldier stationed at a base that stores stocks of nerve gas. Knowing that they can find the killer by finding nerve gas residue on his clothes, the team infiltrates the local laundry mill that services the base, but quickly find that efficiency is poor due to poorly maintained equipment and sloppy layout. In addition, the laundry mill is deeply in debt and on the verge of closing, threatening the mission. Princess decides to purchase the laundry mill and its debt, and the team goes about fixing and rearranging the machinery, which vastly increases efficiency and productivity. Meanwhile, the killer's uniform is inadvertently sent to the laundry mill, and he heads there to recover it. Princess finds his uniform and discovers his true identity, while Chise knocks him out. With their mission done, Princess steps down as the laundry mill's foreman and promotes Marilla, the most veteran laundry mill worker, to take her place. Despite leaving, the team is confident that the laundry mill workers will be able to take care of themselves from now on.
8	9	"Case 20 Ripper Dipper"	August 27, 2017
The team must keep surveillance on Lord O'Reilly in order to find out the identity of the mysterious person he is meeting in secret. While the other team members keep watch from a hotel room, Ange poses as an artist outside O'Reilly's hotel. While on her post, Ange sees an impoverished girl named Julie who unsuccessfully tries to pickpocket people. Feeling pity for Julie, Ange teaches her how to properly pickpocket. She then tells Julie her past, veiled as a fairy tale. Ten years ago, Ange was not only really named Charlotte, but was the real Princess too. She had quickly gotten bored with her dull and sheltered life, regardless of the comforts of royalty. One day, she discovered a crack in the castle wall where she met Princess, the real Ange, who was a poor pickpocket at the time and looked identical to her. They both quickly became friends. Eventually, Ange grew curious about life outside the castle, and switched places with Princess, and quickly discovered the poor living conditions of the rest of the country. Back in the present, with Julie's help, Ange figures out that O'Reilly's contact is Gazelle. In return, Ange frees Julie from her abusive guardian and helps enroll her and others into an orphanage. Ange finishes her story, where both she and Princess were separated after the Revolution, and how Princess had to live in constant fear of discovery for ten years. Meanwhile, Princess meets O'Reilly and warns him that Gazelle is attempting to trick him defecting to the Commonwealth to trap him, and offers her help instead. Afterwards, Ange admits to Princess that she considers her the true Princess now due to her dream to change Albion for the better. The two then play piano together like they used to do as children.
9	5	"Case 11 Pell-mell Duel"	September 3, 2017
Chise writes a letter to her sister back in Japan, telling her about her new life in Albion as well as being part of Princess' spy team. For most of the day, she attends regular school activities, though her differing cultural values make her appear odd to her classmates. Chise is also wary of Lily Gaveston, one of Princess' classmates who has connections to the Duke of Normandy and is possibly spying on them. After school, Chise participates in spy missions with Ange, Dorothy, and Beatrice, though she feels insecure about the fact that her fighting skills aren't always needed. She also regularly reports to Lord Horikawa, who wants to know whether Princess' plan to become Queen will succeed so he knows whether to side with the Kingdom or the Commonwealth. One day, Chise is admiring a butterfly when another student, Cameron, arrogantly kills it in front of her and then insults Japan. Incensed, Chise attempts to challenge Cameron to a duel but Princess intervenes. Rather than stop Chise, Princess teaches Chise the rules for a Western-style duel and helps arrange it, nominating Lily to be the witness. Chise and Cameron use antique pistols for the duel, but Chise quickly finds out that her gun has been sabotaged, so she instead uses her necktie as a makeshift sling to injure Cameron and intimidate him into apologizing. The rest of the spy team celebrate Chise's victory, and reveal that they also used the duel as a distraction to sneak into Lily's room to tap the phone she uses to report to the Duke of Normandy. In her next report to Lord Horikawa, Chise admits that she's not sure if Princess will succeed, but she genuinely wants her to.
10	10	"Case 22 Comfort Comrade"	September 10, 2017
Ange, Dorothy, and Beatrice are sent on a mission to steal secret documents from the First Lord of the Admiralty. They gain assistance from the inside by another Commonwealth agent, Prefect, who was trained in the same class as Ange and Dorothy. During the mission, Beatrice learns that Prefect always ended up being second best to Ange, and the two don't get along because of that rivalry. The mission ends up being a success, and the group celebrates at a pub. Ange and Beatrice leave early while Prefect and Dorothy reminisce about their final exam where, believing that they had failed the exam, Dorothy took Prefect to a local carnival to have some fun. Meanwhile, Ange takes Beatrice to Prefect's room, revealing that Control suspects Prefect is a double agent. Ange deliberately triggers one of Prefect's traps, causing her to flee and confirming the team's suspicions. Prefect is able to evade Ange and reach a train, but Dorothy catches up to her and holds her at gunpoint. Prefect admits that she was poisoned and forced to work for the enemy in return for the cure, and that the woman she looked up the most to and wished to be was in fact Dorothy, not Ange. Prefect then commits suicide so as to spare Dorothy the task of executing her. Ange and Dorothy return to Control to report their success when they discover that L has been replaced by a new superior, General. General congratulates them and then tasks them with a new mission: assassinate Princess.
11	11	"Case 23 Humble Double"	September 17, 2017
Ange and Dorothy reluctantly accept General's mission and return to the school. Dorothy lets Ange go on ahead since she cannot accept having to kill Princess. Ange approaches Princess' room and finds out that Control has assigned a new team to act as her bodyguards, led by a new agent named Zelda. Ange realizes that Control no longer trusts her, as Dorothy and Chise are reassigned and replaced with new agents. Ange secretly meets with Seven, who warns her that the military has seized control of operation and put its own plan in motion. Zelda then instructs Ange to carry out the assassination on Princess in order to prove her loyalty. Ange leads Princess to a nearby airport, where she causes a distraction and both of them switch appearances to confuse Zelda's agents and escape. Ange leads Princess to a departing airship and tells her that they will be running away to Casablanca. Princess however refuses to leave since she is still dedicated to her dream to become Queen and reform the Kingdom. She locks Ange in the airship's cargo hold and returns to Zelda, posing as Ange. Zelda explains to the disguised Princess that they will use her as a symbol to rally rebellious soldiers in the Royal Army and stage a coup to kill the current Queen and replace her with the fake Princess.
12	12	"Case 24 Fall of the Wall"	September 24, 2017
Zelda reveals to Princess that she knows she is not actually Ange, and tells her that the Commonwealth is arranging for the assassination of the Queen at the Royal Cathedral and making Princess the scapegoat to provide an opportunity for the Commonwealth to invade the Kingdom. Back on the airship, Ange manages to escape and return to the school, where she finds Dorothy and Beatrice waiting for her. Dorothy reveals she was given a separate mission from the Commonwealth government to stop General and Zelda's plan. The three of them head to the Royal Cathedral, where they are quickly cornered by Gazelle and contingent of soldiers. Chise provides a distraction for them to escape and proceed to the Cathedral. Meanwhile, Princess tries to convince the rebel soldiers not to go through with the assassination, promising them that she will become the next and last queen to reform the Kingdom. Zelda shoots Princess in an attempt to keep her quiet and is prepared to kill her right when Ange and Chise arrive. Ange takes Princess to safety while Chise chases Zelda off and Dorothy and Beatrice throw smoke bombs into the cathedral crowd to force them to evacuate. In the aftermath, the Duke of Normandy finds Princess' hat, causing him to suspect her involvement. Back at Control, L returns and removes General from his post before asking where the Principal Team is. It is revealed that they are taking a vacation in Casablanca before they are given a new mission.

=== Mobile game ===
A mobile puzzle game titled Princess Principal Game of Mission was released for iOS and Android phones. The game was in operation from August 2017 to December 28, 2018, with certain offline features being added after the game's servers shut down.

=== Films ===
A six-part anime film adaptation of the series titled Princess Principal: Crown Handler was announced on April 29, 2018. The series follows on from the events of the last episode of the series. Actas produces the film series, while Noboru Kimura replaced Ichirō Ōkouchi as scriptwriter. The rest of the cast and staff, with the exception of Ayaka Imamura, returned to reprise their roles for the films. The first film was slated to be released on April 10, 2020, but was postponed to February 11, 2021, due to the COVID-19 pandemic. The second film premiered on September 23, 2021. The third film premiered on April 7, 2023.

Sentai Filmworks also licensed the film series and released Chapter 1 on March 15, 2022, and Chapter 2 on November 22.

=== Manga ===
A manga adaptation by Ryou Akizuki began serialization in Tokuma Shoten's Monthly Comic Ryū website on November 8, 2019. The chapters have been compiled into a single volume as of March 13, 2020.

== Reception ==
Princess Principal has garnered significant praise from critics, with many calling it one of the best anime of 2017. Kotaku picked it as one of best summer 2017 anime series, with writer Cecilia D'Anastasio noting that the "soundtrack is jazzy madness. Its animation is pure beauty. It's full of sharp writing, surprises and edge-of-your-seat intrigue."

The music gained positive comments, especially the opening theme song to the series, "The Other Side of the Wall". The song was named by Chris Farris and Theron Martin from Anime News Network as the best theme song of 2017. It was also nominated for the best opening song at the 2017 Crunchyroll Anime Awards.
