= Yō Taichi =

Japanese voice actress

- 大地 葉
- Born: August 6 Saitama Prefecture, Japan
- Occupation: Voice actress
- Years active: 2011–present
- Agent: VIMS

Yō Taichi (大地 葉, Taichi Yō; born August 6) is a Japanese voice actress from Saitama Prefecture. She is affiliated with VIMS. She is known for her roles as Nino Nijiiro in Idol Time PriPara and Chii Mamiya in Himitsu no AiPri.

== Personal life ==
She passed her audition for the first role in the TV anime Erased.

== Filmography ==
=== TV anime ===
Year	Title	Role	Notes	Ref.
2013	Gingitsune	Kozue Ashihara		
2013	Love Lab	Sayori Mizushima/Sayo		
2014	A Good Librarian Like a Good Shepherd	Sayori Shirasaki, Kyōtarō Kakei (young)		
2014	Ai Tenchi Muyo!	Beni Kinojō		
2014	Akame ga Kill!	Emperor		
2014	Mysterious Joker	Hyakimaru (young)		
2014	Nisekoi	Honda, Student, News Voice		
2014	Witch Craft Works	Kanae Hoozuki		
2014–17	Yu-Gi-Oh! Arc-V	Gloria Tyler, Mikiyo Naname, Takeshi Shimizu, Shinji Weber (young), Amanda		
2015	Nisekoi:	Honda, Hondāson, Student		
2015	Prison School	Anzu Yokoyama		
2015	Saekano: How to Raise a Boring Girlfriend	Tomoya Aki (grade school student), Kiyo Ishimaki, Ranko Morioka		
2015	Seraph of the End	Akane, Host		
2015	Urawa no Usagi-chan	Sakura Tajima		
2015	Young Black Jack	Roro		
2015–16	Haikyu!! Second Season	Daiki Ogasawara, Mako Ōtaki		
2016	Ace Attorney	Mirika/Rika Tachimi		
2016	Alderamin on the Sky	Nia		
2016	Beyblade Burst	Tokonatsu Aoi		
2016	Dimension W	Ham		
2016	Divine Gate	Macbeth		
2016	Erased	Kenya Kobayashi		
2016	High School Fleet	Hideko Yamashita/Shū-chan		
2016	JoJo's Bizarre Adventure: Diamond Is Unbreakable	Young Jōsuke Higashikata		
2016	Kamiwaza Wanda	Marikko		
2016	Magic of Stella	Natsu Iino, Nozomi		
2016	Nanbaka	KAGU-8, Mao Nimaijita, Musashi's mother		
2016	The Disastrous Life of Saiki K.	Kenta Yamagishi, Mera's Younger Brother		
2016	The Great Passage	Rinta		
2016	Mobile Suit Gundam: Iron-Blooded Orphans Season 2	Hirume		
2017	Altair: A Record of Battles	Blanca, Cornelia Nord		
2017	Beyblade Burst God	Tokonatsu Aoi, Sasha Guten		
2017	Grimoire of Zero	Albus		
2017	Idol Time PriPara	Nino Nijiiro		
2017	Interviews with Monster Girls	Yuriko		
2017	Magical Circle Guru Guru	Juju (eps. 4–5, 9–12, 15–16), Sappari Fairy, Dosakusa Fairy		
2017	Masamune-kun's Revenge	Shidō		
2017	Nora, Princess, and Stray Cat	Lucia of End		
2017	Princess Principal	Dorothy		
2017	Saekano: How to Raise a Boring Girlfriend Flat	Motoko Ishinomaki, Aiko Morioka		
2017	Tsugumomo	Sunao Sumeragi		
2018	Beyblade Burst Chōzetsu	Tokonatsu Aoi		
2018	Chio's School Road	Madoka Kushitori		
2018	Double Decker! Doug & Kirill	Maxine "Max" Silverstone		
2018	Tsurune	Rika Seo		
2019	Azur Lane	Ayanami		
2019	A Certain Magical Index III	Leivinia Birdway	eps. 25–26	
2019	Demon Slayer: Kimetsu no Yaiba	Takeo Kamado		
2019	Dr. Stone	Turquise		
2019	Fruits Basket	Hiro Soma		
2019	Granblue Fantasy The Animation	Rackam (young)		
2019	Star Twinkle PreCure	Sakurako Himenojou	Minor Character	
2019	The Case Files of Lord El-Melloi II: Rail Zeppelin Grace Note	Faker/Hephaestion		
2020	Gleipnir	Subaru		
2020	Tsugu Tsugumomo	Sunao Sumeragi		
2020	Monster Girl Doctor	Aluloona Loona		
2021	Azur Lane: Slow Ahead!	Ayanami		
2021	Horimiya	Yuki's Mother		
2021	That Time I Got Reincarnated as a Slime Season 2	Suphia		
2021	Kageki Shojo!!	Kaoru Hoshino		
2021	World's End Harem	Akane Ryūzōji		
2021	Muv-Luv Alternative	Michiru Isumi		
2022	On Air Dekinai!	Mafuneko		
2022	The Dawn of the Witch	Albus		
2022	In the Heart of Kunoichi Tsubaki	Oniyuri		
2022	Detective Conan	Yumi Sekizawa		
2022	Phantom of the Idol	Tsugiko		
2022	Cardfight!! Vanguard will+Dress	Haruka Sokawa		
2022	Extreme Hearts	Yuriko Suemune		
2022	Musasino!	Sakura Tajima		
2022	Mamekichi Mameko NEET no Nichijō	Melo, Sister Kichi		
2022	Shinobi no Ittoki	Mandara Samuragōchi, Samon		
2022	Immoral Guild	Tokishikko Dana		
2022	Play It Cool, Guys	Akane Kōno		
2022	Chainsaw Man	Akane Sawatari		
2023	Tomo-chan Is a Girl!	Mifune		
2023	Campfire Cooking in Another World with My Absurd Skill	Agni		
2023	Dead Mount Death Play	Saya Shinoyama		
2023	The Family Circumstances of the Irregular Witch	Giriko		
2024	The Witch and the Beast	Guideau		
2024	A Salad Bowl of Eccentrics	Priketsu		
2024	Himitsu no AiPri	Chii Mamiya		
2024	Tonari no Yōkai-san	Yuri Tachibana		
2024	Let This Grieving Soul Retire!	Eva Renfield		
2025	I Have a Crush at Work	Maria Morizono		
2025	Umamusume: Cinderella Gray	Rudy Lemono		
2025	Makina-san's a Love Bot?!	Eita Akutsu		
2025	Gachiakuta	Rudo Surebrec (young)		
2025	Mechanical Marie	Isabel		
2026	Jack-of-All-Trades, Party of None	Logan Hayward		
2026	The Warrior Princess and the Barbaric King	Nylea		
2026	A Hundred Scenes of Awajima	Kinue Takehara		
2026	Sparks of Tomorrow	Suzu Harashima		
2026	My Stepmother and Stepsisters Aren't Wicked	Riru Kazan		

=== ONA ===
- The Way of the Househusband (2021), Kid at Mall
- Kakegurui Twin (2022), Yukimi Togakushi
- Rising Impact (2024), Kiria Noshino

=== OVA ===
- Girls und Panzer: This is the Real Anzio Battle! (2014), Pepperoni
- Nisekoi (2014), Honda
- Prison School (2016), Anzu Yokoyama
- Seisei Suru Hodo, Aishiteru (2017), Mia Kurihara
- Mobile Suit Gundam: The Witch from Mercury Prologue (2022), Wendy Olent

=== Anime films ===
- Harmonie (2014), Ryōko
- Kuro no Su - Chronus (2014), Hazuki Horiuchi
- Girls und Panzer der Film (2015), Pepperoni, Kubota
- Monster Strike The Movie (2016), Shirō Amakusa
- Girls und Panzer das Finale (2017), Murakami
- Blackfox (2019), Melissa
- Her Blue Sky (2019), Masatsugu Nakamura
- High School Fleet: The Movie (2020), Hideko Yamashita
- Princess Principal: Crown Handler (2021), Dorothy
- Blue Thermal (2022), Ayako Maki
- Whoever Steals This Book (2025), Kakihara

=== Mobile game ===
- Tokyo 7th Sisters (2014–present), Chacha Ootori
- Azur Lane (2017), IJN Ayanami, HMS Rodney
- Grand Chase: Dimensional Chaser (2018), Lulu
- Girls' Frontline (2018), K3 & Minebea PM-9
- Arknights (2019), Deepcolor, Scavenger
- A Certain Magical Index: Imaginary Fest (2019), Leivinia Birdway
- Dragalia Lost (2021), Sandalphon

=== Web Anime ===
- Hikari: Kariya o Tsunagu Monogatari (2016), Honomi
- Tawawa on Monday (2016), School Nurse, Announcement
- Nanbaka (2017), KAGU-8, Mao Nimaijita
- Idol Land PriPara (2021–24), Nino Nijiiro

=== Video games ===
Year	Title	Role	Source
2013	Ciel Nosurge	Renarl Tatarca	
2014	Idolism	Carmilla (Miura Katō)	
2014	Ar Nosurge	Renarl Tatarca	
2017	The Witch and the Hundred Knight 2	Sophie	
2017	Senko no Ronde 2	Cuilan	
2017	Azur Lane	Ayanami, Rodney	
2016	Yu-Gi-Oh! Duel Monsters Saikyo Card Battle	Guide	
2018	Food Fantasy (2018)	Yunnan Noodles	
2019	Arknights	Deepcolor	
2019	Café Stella and the Reapers' Butterflies	Hiuchidani Mei	
2020	Soulcalibur VI	Setsuka	
2020	Neptunia Virtual Stars	Kado	
2020	Nioh 2	Unknown	
2021	The Caligula Effect 2	Protagonist	
2021	Balan Wonderworld	Cass Milligan	
2026	Arknights: Endfield	Fluorite	
2027	Romancing SaGa 3: Destinies United	Nora	

=== Web Comic ===
- VOMIC Ansatsu Kyōshitsu, Kaede Kayano

=== Dubbing ===
==== Movie ====
- Alice Through the Looking Glass, Queen Elsemere (Hattie Morahan)
- Bad Boys for Life, Kelly (Vanessa Hudgens)
- Bad Boys: Ride or Die, Kelly (Vanessa Hudgens)
- Freaky, Millie Kessler (Kathryn Newton)
- Gen V, Emma Meyer / Little Cricket (Lizze Broadway)
- Godzilla: King of the Monsters, Young Madison (Lexi Rabe)
- The Huntsman: Winter's War, Young Tull (Nana Agyeman-Bediako)
- Mad Max: Fury Road (2019 THE CINEMA edition), The Splendid Angharad (Rosie Huntington-Whiteley)
- Southpaw, Leila Hope (Oona Laurence)
- Split, Marcia (Jessica Sula)
- West Side Story, Graziella (Paloma Garcia-Lee)

==== Animation ====
- Strawberry Shortcake's Berry Bitty Adventures, Orange Blossom
- Olaf's Frozen Adventure
- Super Wings, Sky
- Sofia the First, Princess Cassandra
