= Senpai Is an Otokonoko =

Japanese manga series

- First tankōbon volume cover, featuring Makoto Hanaoka

先輩はおとこのこ (Senpai wa Otokonoko)
- Genre: Romance; Coming-of-age
- Manga
- Written by: Pom
- Published by: Line Corporation (digital); Ichijinsha (print)
- English publisher: Webtoon (digital); NA: Kodansha USA (print)
- Original run: December 7, 2019 – December 30, 2021
- Volumes: 10
- Manga

Senpai Is an Otokonoko: The Encounter
- Written by: Pom
- Published by: Line Corporation
- Original run: December 21, 2023 – April 17, 2025
- Anime television series
- Directed by: Shinsuke Yanagi
- Written by: Yoriko Tomita
- Music by: Yukari Hashimoto
- Studio: Project No.9
- Licensed by: Crunchyroll (streaming)
- Original network: Fuji TV (Noitamina)
- Original run: July 5, 2024 – September 27, 2024
- Episodes: 12
- Anime film

Senpai Is an Otokonoko: Sunshine After the Rain
- Directed by: Shinsuke Yanagi; Kenta Ōnishi; In Seob Choi; Keisuke Aida; Zi Hao Xuan
- Written by: Seiko Takagi; Yoriko Tomita
- Music by: Yukari Hashimoto
- Studio: Project No.9
- Licensed by: Crunchyroll
- Released: February 14, 2025
- Runtime: 82 minutes
- icon

Senpai Is an Otokonoko (Japanese: 先輩はおとこのこ, Hepburn: Senpai wa Otokonoko; "My Upperclassman Is an Otokonoko"), also known as This Is Him or Senpai Is an Otokonoko: My Crossdressing Classmate, is a Japanese romance manga series written and illustrated by Pom. It was serialized digitally through Line Manga from 2019 to 2021 as a weekly series, and is collected in tankōbon print volumes by Ichijinsha since 2021. The story follows a love triangle involving Makoto Hanaoka, a cross-dresser; Saki Aoi, a bisexual younger student; and Ryuji Taiga, a childhood friend of Makoto's. Senpai Is an Otokonoko received an official English translation by Webtoon beginning on March 9, 2023. An anime television series adaptation produced by Project No.9 aired from July to September 2024 on Fuji TV's Noitamina programming block. An anime film titled Eiga Senpai wa Otokonoko: Ame Nochi Hare premiered on February 14, 2025.

Pom created the series with themes such as love regardless of gender, and originally came up with the concept based on how she had difficulties in drawing male characters. The series was popular with readers and well received by critics for its writing and characters, becoming the third-place web manga winner of the 2021 Next Manga Award and the third most read Line Manga series of 2021.

== Premise ==
Senpai Is an Otokonoko is a romance manga following Makoto Hanaoka, a high school student who dresses like a woman despite his mother's disapproval. Saki Aoi, a girl attending the same high school as Makoto, falls in love with him under the belief that he is a woman, and only learns the truth after confessing her feelings for him and getting rejected. She is bisexual and does not mind what his gender is, and still wishes to become his first love, but he still does not reciprocate her feelings at all, and worries that she will be seen as odd by associating with a cross-dresser. Ryuji Taiga, a childhood friend of Makoto's, is initially unsure about being with another man, but a love triangle involving the three forms as he warms up to it.

== Characters ==
Makoto Hanaoka (花岡 まこと, Hanaoka Makoto)
Voiced by: Shūichirō Umeda
Makoto is a second-year student who is a crossdresser. He is often judged by many around him for his choice to dress up as a woman but still chooses to wear them anyway. He keeps it a secret from his mother. Initially, he does not like the idea of falling in love, and constantly pushes Aoi away, but as the story progresses, his views on love begin to change.
Saki Aoi (蒼井 咲, Aoi Saki)
Voiced by: Akira Sekine
Saki is a first-year student who falls in love with Makoto at first sight. She is considered to be bisexual, as she does not care about Makoto's gender and loves him for who he is. She is bright and energetic. Though Makoto does not reciprocate her feelings whatsoever, he eventually warms up to her and appreciates her being close with him.
Ryuji Taiga (大我 竜二, Taiga Ryūji)
Voiced by: Yuma Uchida
Ryuji is a second-year student who is Makoto's childhood best friend since kindergarten. He has been in love with Makoto since they were young. Alongside Aoi, Ryuji is one of the few people who is able to accept Makoto for who he is and the choices he makes to become a crossdresser. Saki affectionally calls him 'Master'.
Mika Hanaoka (花岡 美香, Hanaoka Mika)
Voiced by: Mai Nakahara
Mika is Makoto's mother who strongly detests Makoto's interest in feminine qualities. She wants her son to be strong and manly, not to be girlish. Makoto keeps it a secret from her to further prevent her from causing anguish against him. The root cause of her distaste in feminine items stems from seeing her father as a crossdresser. She distances herself from her father and wishes for her son to never follow his footsteps.
Konatsu Taiga (大我 小夏, Taiga Konatsu)
Voiced by: Kaori Maeda
Ryuji's little sister.
Masako Aoi (蒼井 雅子, Aoi Masako)
Voiced by: Ai Satō
Saki's grandmother who is wary of Chihiro, Aoi's mother.
Kaede Hanekawa (羽川 楓, Hanekawa Kaede)
Voiced by: Azusa Aoi
Makoto's classmate who asked him out to a dance in the school prom. Like Aoi and Ryuji, she doesn't judge Makoto's feminine interests.
Jun Saotome (早乙女 純, Saotome Jun)
Voiced by: Gakuto Kajiwara
Saotome is Ryuji's classmate who holds strong feelings for Hayase. He enlists help from Makoto and Ryuji so he could get closer to her.
Yūji Aoi (蒼井 裕司, Aoi Yūji)
Voiced by: Yūji Murai
Saki's father who is interested in whales. He is often busy, and he doesn't see Saki much.
Chihiro Ishikawa (石川 千尋, Ishikawa Chihiro)
Voiced by: Hitomi Ishikawa
Saki's mother. After abandoning Aoi and her husband, she comes back into her daughter's life years later in hopes to fix what she has broken in the past.
Ai Hayase (早瀬 藍, Hayase Ai)
Voiced by: Ai Kakuma
Makoto's classmate who used to be a friend. After Makoto was exposed as a man, they became distant, but later fixed their relationship at a field trip.
Eiichirō Kawasaki (川崎 英一郎, Kawasaki Eiichirō)
Voiced by: Masahiko Tanaka
Makoto's grandfather who has a turbulent relationship with his mother. He was disowned by his own daughter after she discovered his feminine interests.
Hiroshi Hongo (本郷博, Hongo Hiroshi)
Voiced by: Toshiya Miyata (Kis-My-Ft2)

== Production ==
Senpai Is an Otokonoko was written and illustrated by Pom, and originated in how she had difficulties drawing male characters, and received advice from an acquaintance to draw a series where a male character dresses like a woman; prior to this, she had considered making a series about a lesbian romance. Due to her difficulty with male characters, she had to dedicate a lot of time to the panel where Makoto shows that he is not a girl, and in the end still remained unhappy with it. The setting was designed around Makoto's cross-dressing, with a school where female students wear sailor fuku, ensuring visual contrast against the male school uniform. Although Japanese high schools allowing male students to wear female school uniforms do exist, the one Makoto attends was not modeled after any specific real-world schools.

Early in the planning of the manga, Pom considered making it a gag-based comedy, but decided to lean more toward a serious tone as that is what she personally enjoys reading, which is what led her to write Makoto's troubled relationship with his mother. Among the major themes are human relationships, love regardless of gender, the importance of respecting diversity, being able to like cute things as a man, and the importance of taking care of oneself, although Pom did not specifically write the story with the intent to combat prejudices against people who defy gender norms. She did not want the story to feel dark, so she was conscious about balancing darker scenes with lighter ones.

Pom intentionally kept the story focused on just three main characters, saying that she dislikes when a manga's cast grows while its story gets less focused and goes off on tangents. Makoto and Saki were designed to contrast against each other, with Makoto being an anxious person who does not move much, and Saki being a confident person who always moves; Ryuji was created as a balance between the two. She used voice actress Tomoko Kaneda as reference for Saki's movements, and conceived of her as a proactive, immature girl who always is true to herself. When writing and drawing Makoto, she was conscious of how Makoto only dresses like a woman because he likes the aesthetic, and so intended to portray him as male on the inside. She intentionally tried to limit the amount of text in the series, and instead used visual storytelling whenever possible. As Pom had only intended for the series to last for 16 chapters, she did not have a detailed plan for how to continue the story after that, and let it go wherever the characters took it after planning out backgrounds for them; she thought that they could not portray things believably unless she had experienced it herself, and described the characters as all having parts of the author within them.

== Media ==
=== Manga ===
The manga began as the four-page story Otokonoko ga Kōhai ni Kokuhaku Sareru Hanashi, (Note: Otokonoko ga Kōhai ni Kokuhaku Sareru Hanashi (おとこのこが後輩に告白される話; "A Story About an Underclassman Confessing to an Otokonoko")) which Pom re-drew and expanded for a pilot in Line Manga's "frontier debut program" for independent creators in December 2019, and got signed for weekly digital serialization within four months of the premiere. The series ended with chapter 100 on December 30, 2021; Pom had considered continuing it further, but wanted to end it at a high point and not stretch it out. A prequel titled Senpai Is an Otokonoko: The Encounter (Note: Senpai wa Otokonoko Deai-hen (先輩はおとこのこ 出会い編)) was released through Line Manga starting December 21, 2023, and ended after 72 chapters on April 17, 2025.

The first tankōbon volume collecting the series in full color along with a new 16-page chapter was released on November 25, 2021, by Ichijinsha; Pom thought it would be difficult to prepare the series for print as it was originally created for a vertically scrolling digital format, and considered abandoning the idea, but proceeded because of reader requests. The print volumes have been licensed in Traditional Chinese by Tong Li Publishing, with the first volume released on March 6, 2023; and in Korean by Daewon C.I., with the first volume released on July 13, 2023. At Sakura-Con 2024, Kodansha USA announced that the series was licensed for English language publication as Senpai Is an Otokonoko: My Crossdressing Classmate, with the first volume released in June 2025.

Webtoon began serializing the series digitally in other regions in 2021, with a Taiwanese release beginning on December 25, 2021, a Chinese release on December 27, 2021, a Thai release on February 13, 2022, a South Korean release on February 18, 2022, a French release on March 28, 2022, as My Crossdressing Crush, and a German release on May 28, 2022, under the same title. The series has also been released in English by Webtoon beginning on March 9, 2023, as Senpai Is an Otokonoko.

==== Volumes ====
No.	Original release date	Original ISBN	English release date	English ISBN
1	November 25, 2021	978-4-7580-2313-9	June 17, 2025	979-8-88877-361-1
Chapter 1: "A Letter" (手紙, Tegami); Chapter 2: "Junior" (後輩, Kōhai); Chapter 3: "Girls" (女の子, Onnanoko); Chapter 4: "A Childhood Friend" (幼なじみ, Osananajimi); Chapter 5: "Aoi-san" (蒼井さん); Chapter 6: "Master" (師匠, Shishō); Chapter 7: "A Secret" (隠し事, Kakushigoto); Chapter 8: "Fireworks" (花火, Hanabi); "Bangai-hen" (番外編; "Extra Chapter")
Saki Aoi confesses her romantic feelings for Makoto Hanaoka under the belief that he is a woman, but he rejects her and explains that he is a cross-dressing man. Saki is bisexual and still wishes to be with him, but he avoids her, worried that people will find her strange for associating with him. His childhood friend Ryuji Taiga later confronts her about how she follows Makoto around, but accidentally reveals to her that he too is attracted to Makoto, and makes her keep it a secret. Saki begins spending her lunch breaks with Makoto and Ryuji and becomes friends with them, and they exchange contact information ahead of the summer vacation. At home, Makoto does not wear his feminine clothes or his wig: his mother thinks men should be masculine, so he keeps his love for feminine and cute things a secret from her.
2	April 25, 2022	978-4-7580-2387-0	August 19, 2025	979-8-88877-362-8
Chapter 9: "Summer Vacation" (夏休み, Natsuyasumi); Chapter 10: "Want" (憧れ, Akogare); Chapter 11: "Shopping" (買い物, Kaimono); Chapter 12: "The Past" (過去, Kako); Chapter 13: "Moving On" (満足, Manzoku); Chapter 14: "Goodbye" (さよなら, Sayonara); Chapter 15: "Normal" (普通, Futsū); Chapter 16: "The Prince and the Princess" (王子様とお姫様, Ōji-sama to Ohime-sama); "Bangai-hen" (番外編; "Extra Chapter")
3	July 25, 2022	978-4-7580-2437-2	October 14, 2025	979-8-88877-363-5
Chapter 17: "Change" (変化, Henka); Chapter 18: "Aquarium" (水族館, Suizokukan); Chapter 19: "Special Someone" (特別な人, Tokubetsu na Hito); Chapter 20: "Staying Over" (泊まり, Tomari); Chapter 21: "Study Camp" (勉強会, Benkyōkai); Chapter 22: "Doubt" (疑惑, Giwaku); Chapter 23: "Confused" (わからない, Wakaranai) (Note: Titled Wakaranai (分からない) in the serialization, but was later changed in the tankōbon volumes.); Chapter 24: "Like" (好き, Suki); Chapter 25: "Running Away" (逃げたい, Nigetai); Chapter 26: "I Knew It" (やっぱり, Yappari); "Bangai-hen" (番外編; "Extra Chapter")
4	November 25, 2022	978-4-7580-2468-6	December 16, 2025	979-8-88877-364-2
Chapter 27: "Coming Clean" (ちゃんと, Chanto); Chapter 28: "Whales" (クジラ, Kujira); Chapter 29: "Rainy Day" (雨の日, Ame no Hi); Chapter 30: "Career" (進路, Shinro); Chapter 31: "Choices" (選択, Sentaku); Chapter 32: "Confession" (告白, Kokuhaku); Chapter 33: "Preparation" (準備, Junbi); Chapter 34: "School Festival" (文化祭, Bunkasai); Chapter 35: "That Kind of Person" (そういうヤツ, Sōiu Yatsu); Chapter 36: "No Hiding It" (ごまかせない, Gomakasenai); Chapter 37: "Advice" (相談, Sōdan); Chapter 38: "Sorry" (ごめん, Gomen); Chapter 39: "Resolve" (決意, Ketsui); "Bangai-hen" (番外編; "Extra Chapter")
5	March 29, 2023	978-4-7580-2505-8	February 17, 2026	979-8-8887-7365-9
Chapter 40: "I'm Fine" (大丈夫, Daijōbu); Chapter 41: "Someone" (誰か, Dareka); Chapter 42: "Busybody" (不審者, Fushinsha); Chapter 43: "Morning" (朝, Asa); Chapter 44: "Father" (お父さん, Otōsan); Chapter 45: "Obsessed" (夢中, Muchū); Chapter 46: "Christmas" (クリスマス, Kurisumasu); Chapter 47: "Mom" (お母さん, Okāsan); Chapter 48: "It Hurts" (痛い, Itai); Chapter 49: "Snow Forecast" (雪が降る, Yuki ga Furu); Chapter 50: "The Pain of Others" (それぞれの, Sorezore no); "Bangai-hen" (番外編; "Extra Chapter")
6	July 25, 2023	978-4-7580-2563-8	May 19, 2026	979-8-8887-7366-6
Chapter 51: "Date" (デート, Dēto); Chapter 52: "Hungry" (おなか, Onaka); Chapter 53: "Got to Be" (きっと, Kitto); Chapter 54: "New Year's Eve" (大晦日, Ōmisoka); Chapter 55: "First Sunrise of the Year" (初日の出, Hatsu Hinode); Chapter 56: "Think" (考える, Kangaeru); Chapter 57: "Sister" (妹, Imōto); Chapter 58: "New Semester" (新学期, Shingakki); Chapter 59: "Answers" (正解, Seikai); Chapter 60: "Reunion" (再会, Saikai); "Bangai-hen" (番外編; "Extra Chapter")
7	November 24, 2023	978-4-7580-2609-3	August 18, 2026	979-8-8887-7367-3
Chapter 61: "My..." (私の, Watashi no); Chapter 62: "Runaway" (家出, Iede); Chapter 63: "Hayase-san" (早瀬さん); Chapter 64: "Friends" (友だち, Tomodachi) (Note: Titled Tomodachi (友達) in the serialization, but was later changed in the tankōbon volumes.); Chapter 65: "School Trip: Day 1" (修学旅行1日目, Shūgaku Ryokō 1-nichi-me); Chapter 66: "School Trip: Day 2" (修学旅行2日目, Shūgaku Ryokō 2-nichi-me); Chapter 67: "School Trip: Day 3" (修学旅行3日目, Shūgaku Ryokō 3-nichi-me); Chapter 68: "Facing Up" (向き合う, Mukiau); Chapter 69: "Trip" (旅, Tabi); "Bangai-hen" (番外編; "Extra Chapter")
8	April 1, 2024	978-4-7580-2674-1	October 20, 2026	—
Chapter 70: "Nail Polish" (気持ち悪い, Kimochi Warui); Chapter 71: "Father" (父, Chichi); Chapter 72: "Wonderful" (すてき, Suteki) (Note: Titled Suteki (素敵) in the serialization, but was later changed in the tankōbon volumes.); Chapter 73: "Important People" (大事な人, Daiji na Hito); Chapter 74: "Wonderland" (ワンダーランド, Wandārando); Chapter 75: "Souvenir" (おみやげ, Omiyage); Chapter 76: "Going Home" (帰宅, Kitaku); Chapter 77: "The Passing Days" (日々, Hibi); Chapter 78: "Still" (今はまだ, Ima wa Mada); Chapter 79: "Together" (一緒, Issho); Chapter 80: "Here" (こっち, Kotchi); "Bangai-hen" (番外編; "Extra Chapter")
9	July 25, 2024	978-4-7580-2734-2	December 22, 2026	—
Chapter 81: "Spring Vacation" (春休み, Haruyasumi); Chapter 82: "Discovery" (見つける, Mitsukeru); Chapter 83: "Encounter" (遭遇, Sōgū); Chapter 84: "Break for It" (走っていく, Hashitte Iku); Chapter 85: "Choosing" (選ぶ, Erabu); Chapter 86: "Happiness" (幸せ, Shiawase); Chapter 87: "It Suits Me" (似合う, Niau); Chapter 88: "The Road Home" (帰り道, Kaerimichi); Chapter 89: "Moving Forward" (進む, Susumu); Chapter 90: "Parents" (両親, Ryōshin); "Bangai-hen" (番外編; "Extra Chapter")
10	October 25, 2024	978-4-7580-2790-8	February 23, 2027	—
Chapter 91: "Home" (家, Ie); Chapter 92: "Protect" (守る, Mamoru); Chapter 93: "The Real Thing" (本物, Honmono); Chapter 94: "Really" (ほんと, Honto); Chapter 95: "That's All" (ただそれだけ, Tada Sore Dake); Chapter 96: "Love" (変, Hen); Chapter 97: "Relying On" (頼る, Tayoru); Chapter 98: "I Like You" (好き, Suki); Chapter 99: "Special" (特別, Tokubetsu); Chapter 100: "Sunny Days" (晴れの日, Hare no Hi); "Bangai-hen" (番外編; "Extra Chapter")

==== Chapters not yet in tankōbon format ====
These chapters have yet to be published in a tankōbon volume.

101. "Chūgakusei" (中学生; "Middle School Student")
102. "Machigai" (間違い; "Mistake")
103. "Bukatsu" (部活; "Extracurricular Activities")
104. "Kore" (これ; "This")
105. "Kirei" (きれい; "Pretty")
106. "Nande" (なんで; "Why")
107. "Urusai" (うるさい; "Annoying")
108. "Yamanobori" (山登り; "Mountain Climbing")
109. "Yūjō" (友情; "Friendship")
110. "Koibana" (恋バナ; "Girls' Talk")
111. "Chōsei" (調整; "Coordination")
112. "Hasegawa-san" (長谷川さん)
113. "Iraira" (イライラ; "Irritatedly")
114. "Dōrui" (同類; "Alike")
115. "Ichigakki" (一学期; "First Semester")
116. "Sukāto" (スカート; "Skirt")
117. "Kami" (髪; "Hair")
118. "Junchō" (順調; "Going Well")
119. "Taifū no Hi" (台風の日; "Day of the Typhoon")
120. "Masumi-chan" (真澄ちゃん)
121. "Buranko" (ブランコ; "Swings")
122. "Hen na Ko" (変なコ; "Weird Girl")
123. "Sōiu no" (そういうの; "Like That")
124. "Mitsuki-senpai" (みつき先輩)
125. "2-nensei" (2年生; "Second Years")
126. "Kanojo" (彼女; "Girlfriend")
127. "Natsumatsuri" (夏祭り; "Summer Festival")
128. "Kawattenai" (変わってない; "Haven't Changed")
129. "Kono Hito Dake" (この人だけ; "Only This Person")
130. "Itsuka" (いつか; "Someday")
131. "Henka" (変化; "Change")
132. "Jōsō" (女装; "Crossdressing")
133. "Sēfu" (セーフ; "Safe")
134. "Niattenai" (似合ってない; "Doesn't Suit Me")
135. "Hontō no Koto" (本当のこと; "The Truth")
136. "Bunkasai" (文化祭; "School Festival")
137. "Dōrui" (同類; "Alike")
138. "Nigeru" (逃げる; "Running Away")
139. "Itsuwaru" (偽る; "Lying")
140. "Tadashii" (正しい; "Proper")
141. "Komatta Kao" (困った顔; "Troubled Face")
142. "Mitsukeru" (見つける; "Discovery")
143. "Fukaku Kakawaru (深く関わる; "Deeply Involved")
144. "Uranaishi" (占い師; "Fortune Teller")
145. "Chikazuku" (近づく; "Getting Closer")
146. "Sakura to Dango" (桜と団子; "Cherry Blossoms and Dango")
147. "Uso" (嘘; "Lie")
148. "Benkyō" (勉強; "Study")
149. "Kankei Nai" (関係ない; "Unrelated")
150. "Iwanai Hō ga Ii Koto" (言わない方がいいこと; "Something Better Left Unsaid")
151. "Fumikiri" (踏切; "Railway Crossing")
152. "Mesen" (目線; "Gaze")
153. "Gēmu Ōbā" (ゲームオーバー; "Game Over")
154. "Sabori" (さぼり; "Skipping School")
155. "Shibōkō" (志望校; "First-Choice School")
156. "Juken" (受験; "Entrance Exams")
157. "Tokebetsu" (特別; "Special")
158. "Sotsugyōshiki" (卒業式; "Graduation Ceremony")
159. "Shin Seikatsu" (新生活; "New Life")
160. "Kakugo" (覚悟; "Determination")
161. "Makoto" (まこと)
162. "Ryūji" (りゅーじ; "Ryuji")
163. "Wakannai" (分かんない; "Don't Understand")
164. "Higaisha" (被害者; "Victim")
165. "Fumikiri" (踏切; "Railway Crossing")
166. "Seikai" (正解; "Answers")
167. "Daijōbu" (大丈夫; "I'm Fine")
168. "Kazoku" (家族; "Family")
169. "Kōkō" (高校; "High School")
170. "Minaifuri" (見ないふり; "Pretend Not to See")
171. "Kinobori" (木登り; "Tree Climbing")
172. "Deai" (出会い; "Encounter")

=== Anime ===
An anime television series adaptation was announced by Aniplex at AnimeJapan on March 25, 2023. It is produced by Project No.9 and directed by Shinsuke Yanagi, with Yoriko Tomita as head writer, characters designed by Shōto Shinkai, and music composed by Yukari Hashimoto. The series aired from July 5 to September 27, 2024, on Fuji TV's Noitamina programming block. (Note: Fuji TV listed the series premiere on July 4, 2024, at 24:55, which is effectively July 5 at 12:55 a.m. JST.) The opening theme song is "Be a Good Egoist" (我がまま, Wagamama), while the ending theme song is "Shape of Love" (あれが恋だったのかな, Are ga Koi Datta no kana), both performed by Kujira, with the latter featuring Nishina. Crunchyroll streamed the series outside of Asia.

Following the anime series' finale, a theatrical anime film titled Eiga Senpai wa Otokonoko: Ame Nochi Hare (Note: Eiga Senpai wa Otokonoko: Ame Nochi Hare (映画 先輩はおとこのこ あめのち晴れ; "Senpai Is an Otokonoko: Sunshine After the Rain")) was announced on September 27, 2024. The staff from the anime series returned to reprise their production roles, alongside director Shinsuke Yanagi, for whom the film served as his directorial debut. Serving the continuation of the television series, it was released on February 14, 2025. The film's theme song is "I Can't Grow Up" (大人になれない, Otona ni Narenai) performed by Kujiura. Crunchyroll began streaming the film on August 28, 2025, as four episodes.

==== Episodes ====
No.	Title	Directed by	Written by	Storyboarded by	Chief animation directed by	Original release date
1	"Senpai Is an Otokonoko"; Transliteration: "Senpai wa Otokonoko" (Japanese: 先輩はおとこのこ)	Zi Hao Xuan & Keisuke Gouda	Yoriko Tomita	Shinsuke Yanagi	Shōto Shinkai	July 5, 2024
2	"Cute Things Pilgrimage"; Transliteration: "Kawaii Mono Meguri" (Japanese: かわいいものめぐり)	Lin Yingchen	Yoriko Tomita	Keiichi Ishikura	Shōto Shinkai, Eri Ogawa, Yuta Masaki & Tae Inotsume	July 12, 2024
3	"Goodbye, Me"; Transliteration: "Sayonara Watashi" (Japanese: さよならわたし)	Project No.9 (Note: Some episodes of Project No.9 shows would have the company listed as an episode director, rather than the actual director. Therefore, it is not known who directed this episode.)	Yoriko Tomita	Zi Hao Xuan	Shōto Shinkai	July 19, 2024
4	"I Realized Something"; Transliteration: "Kizuiteshimatta" (Japanese: 気づいてしまった)	Keisuke Gouda	Yoriko Tomita	Keiichi Ishikura	Shōto Shinkai, Eri Ogawa, Susumu Watanabe & Yuta Masaki	July 26, 2024
5	"Special"; Transliteration: "Tokubetsu" (Japanese: 特別)	Kousei Hirayama & Shigeki Awai	Yoriko Tomita	Zi Hao Xuan	Shōto Shinkai, Eri Ogawa, Yuta Masaki & Haruki Moriya	August 2, 2024
6	"I've Got to Decide"; Transliteration: "Kimenakya Ikenai Koto" (Japanese: 決めなきゃいけないこと)	Seong Beom Kim	Seiko Takagi	Keiichi Ishikura	Shōto Shinkai & Yuta Masaki	August 16, 2024
7	"Like That"; Transliteration: "Sōiu no" (Japanese: そーいうの)	Project No.9 (Note: Uncredited in the episode itself.)	Yoriko Tomita	Zi Hao Xuan	Shōto Shinkai, Eri Ogawa, Yuta Masaki & Haruki Moriya	August 23, 2024
8	"Wound"; Transliteration: "Kizuguchi" (Japanese: 傷ぐち)	Chuan Feng Xu	Seiko Takagi	Lin Yingchen	Shōto Shinkai & Pei Fei Wang	August 30, 2024
9	"Christmas"; Transliteration: "Kurisumasu" (Japanese: クリスマス)	Keisuke Gouda	Seiko Takagi	Zi Hao Xuan	Shōto Shinkai, Eri Ogawa, Yuta Masaki & Tae Inotsume	September 6, 2024
10	"Their Feelings"; Transliteration: "Futari no Omoi" (Japanese: ふたりの思い)	Fumio Maezono	Yoriko Tomita	Keiichi Ishikura	Shōto Shinkai, Eri Ogawa & Yuta Masaki	September 13, 2024
11	"Used to Be Friends"; Transliteration: "Moto Tomodachi" (Japanese: 元ともだち)	Shigeki Awai	Seiko Takagi	Keiichi Ishikura	Shōto Shinkai, Eri Ogawa & Yuta Masaki	September 20, 2024
12	"The Real Me"; Transliteration: "Hontō no Boku" (Japanese: 本当のぼく)	Mizuki Sakuma	Yoriko Tomita	Zi Hao Xuan	Shōto Shinkai, Eri Ogawa & Yuta Masaki	September 27, 2024

==== Film (2025) ====
Title	Directed by	Written by	Storyboarded by	Chief animation directed by	Original release date
Senpai Is an Otokonoko: Sunshine After the Rain Transliteration: "Eiga Senpai wa Otokonoko: Ame Nochi Hare" (Japanese: 映画 先輩はおとこのこ あめのち晴れ)	Shinsuke Yanagi, Kenta Ōnishi, In Seob Choi, Keisuke Aida & Zi Hao Xuan	Seiko Takagi & Yoriko Tomita	Keiichi Ishikura, Hideki Futamura & Zi Hao Xuan	Eri Ogawa, Shōto Shinkai & Yūta Masaki	February 14, 2025

== Reception ==
Senpai Is an Otokonoko was well received by critics and readers, and was the third-place winner of the 2021 Next Manga Award in the web manga category. It rose in popularity in 2020, and became the third most read series for female readers of 2021 on Line Manga, after Mayu Murata's Honey Lemon Soda and Yaongyi's True Beauty. (Note: Line Manga only presented data for January 1–October 31.) It was the third highest ranked in AnimeJapan's 2021 survey about what manga series published in the preceding year that readers would like to see adapted into anime, and the highest ranked in 2022.

The writing was well received for discussing potentially heavy topics like sexuality while managing to keep a light tone; Oricon and Nijimen both thought it did a good job at portraying the characters' psychology, and their struggles in wanting to be open about themselves while fearing the vulnerability that comes with it. Da Vinci wrote that they knew they loved the series when reading the Chapter 31 line "does it have to be one or the other?", and found the portrayal of Makoto's situation at home with his disapproving mother and how it affects his loneliness profound; they recommended the manga to everyone regardless of age or gender. Critics liked the characters, with Magmix calling Makoto appealing and cute, and the cast as a whole depicted in a humanistic way, and Da Vinci finding themselves invested in the characters' relationships. Reviewing the manga for Model Press, Kira Yokoyama recommended it to readers who like coming-of-age stories and school settings, finding the story fresh and interesting, with well-written portrayals of the characters' feelings, and an appealing protagonist who is both cute and cool. The artwork was also well received, with both Oricon and Nijimen describing the coloring as beautiful, and Da Vinci calling the scene where Makoto reveals his gender particularly well drawn.
