= Akira Sekine =

Japanese voice actress

- 関根 明良
- Born: Tokyo, Japan
- Occupation: Voice actress
- Years active: 2014–present
- Agent: Aptepro
- Notable work: Aikatsu! as Miyabi Fujiwara; Soaring Sky! Pretty Cure as Sora Harewataru/Cure Sky; Princess Principal as Princess Charlotte; Senpai Is an Otokonoko as Saki Aoi; Wistoria: Wand and Sword as Elfaria Albis Serfort

Akira Sekine (関根 明良, Sekine Akira) is a Japanese voice actress. She is affiliated with Aptepro.

== Works ==
=== Anime ===
- Nisekoi (2014) - Raku Ichijou (child), Female Student, Schoolgirl, Student, Suzuki
- Aikatsu! (2014) - Miyabi Fujiwara
- Dog Days (2015) - Maid, Newscaster, Star's People
- Young Black Jack (2015) - Chu
- Anti-Magic Academy: The 35th Test Platoon (2015), Akira Yoshimizu, Hostess B, Nero
- Tanaka-kun is Always Listless (2016) - Miyo-chan. Boy B, Furuya-sensei, Schoolgirl
- Magic of Stella (2016) - Haruma Seki, Seller, Student, Yumine's mother
- Haikyu!! 3rd Season (2016) - Schoolgirl, Shiratorizawa female supporter, Tendō's coach
- Sagrada Reset (2017) - Advisor, Hiroyuki Sasano (child)
- Princess Principal (2017) - Princess
- New Game!! (2017) - Butterfly Pink
- Hand Shakers (2017) - Woman
- How to Keep a Mummy (2018) - Aa-kun, Tazuki Kamiya (child)
- Tokyo Ghoul:re (2018) - Hairu Ihei
- Asobi Asobase (2018) - Hanako's mother, Umeko Andō
- Kemurikusa (2019) - Ryoku
- Magical Girl Spec-Ops Asuka (2019) - Kurumi Mugen
- W'z (2019) - Haruka's mother
- The Magnificent Kotobuki (2019) - Tamil
- Kemono Michi: Rise Up (2019) - Shigure
- Tower of God (2020) - Aanak Jahad
- Assault Lily Bouquet (2020) - Araya Endō
- My Dress-Up Darling (2022) - Rune, Veronica
- Akebi's Sailor Uniform (2022) - Kei Tanigawa
- Cap Kakumei Bottleman DX (2022) - Kaori Hakase
- Birdie Wing: Golf Girls' Story (2022) - Lily Lipman
- Fuuto PI (2022) - Tokime
- Is It Wrong to Try to Pick Up Girls in a Dungeon? IV (2023) - Maryū Reage
- To Your Eternity (2023) - Yuiss
- Apparently, Disillusioned Adventurers Will Save the World (2023) - Clerk, Rose
- The Iceblade Sorcerer Shall Rule the World (2023) - Ariane Algren
- Ippon Again! (2023) - Emma Durand
- Soaring Sky! Pretty Cure (2023) - Sora Harewataru/Cure Sky/Dark Sky
- The Family Circumstances of the Irregular Witch (2023) - Luna
- Migi & Dali (2023) - Karen Ichijō
- My Instant Death Ability Is So Overpowered (2024) - Theodisia
- I Was Reincarnated as the 7th Prince so I Can Take My Time Perfecting My Magical Ability (2024) - Tao
- Wistoria: Wand and Sword (2024) - Elfaria Alvis Serfort
- Senpai Is an Otokonoko (2024) - Saki Aoi
- Too Many Losing Heroines! (2024) - Asami Gondō
- Let This Grieving Soul Retire! (2024) - Luda Lumbeck
- Fate/strange Fake (2024) - True Rider/Hippolyta
- Hazure Skill "Kinomi Master" (2025) - Dratena
- From Bureaucrat to Villainess: Dad's Been Reincarnated! (2025) - Anna Doll
- Babanba Banban Vampire (2025) - Kaoru Yamaba
- Dr. Stone: Science Future (2025) - Luna
- Flower and Asura (2025) - Mitsuka Hiiragidani
- Rock Is a Lady's Modesty (2025) - Lilisa Suzunomiya
- Apocalypse Bringer Mynoghra (2025) - Soalina
- Shabake (2025) - Suzuhiko-hime
- Umamusume: Cinderella Gray (2025) - Moonlight Lunacy
- An Adventurer's Daily Grind at Age 29 (2026) - Dragon
- Eren the Southpaw (2026) - Akari Kishi
- Draw This, Then Die! (2026) - Ai Yasumi
- Kaiju Girl Caramelise (2026) - Manatsu Tomosato
- Jaadugar: A Witch in Mongolia (2026) - Sitara
- Hanaori-san Still Wants to Fight in the Next Life (2026) - Meteor Hanaori
- Magic Repo Man (2026) - Misa
- Red Riding Hood: A Detective Story (2027) - Pinocchio

=== Anime films ===
- Princess Principal: Crown Handler (2021) - Princess
- Pretty Cure All Stars F (2023) - Sora Harewataru/Cure Sky
- Fuuto PI: The Portrait of Kamen Rider Skull (2024) - Tokime
- Wonderful Pretty Cure! The Movie: A Grand Adventure in a Thrilling Game World! (2024) - Sora Harewataru/Cure Sky
- Eiga Senpai wa Otokonoko: Ame Nochi Hare (2025) - Saki Aoi
- You and Idol Pretty Cure the Movie: For You! Our Kirakilala Concert! (2025) - Sora Harewataru/Cure Sky
- Aikatsu! × PriPara the Movie: The Miraculous Encounter (2025) - Miyabi Fukiwara

=== Original video animation ===
- Fate/Grand Carnival (2021) - Ritsuka Fujimaru

=== Original net animation ===
- High-Rise Invasion (2021) - Kuon Shinzaki

=== Games ===
- Shanago Collection - Legacy Outback
- Aikatsu! My No.1 Stage! - Miyabi Fujiwara
- EARTH WARS
- .hack//New World
- Koku No Ishtaria - Ara, Noel, Allan, Helios
- Tenka Hyakken - Fudou Yukimitsu
- Ash Arms - Spitfire Mk. I, SU-85
- Grimms Notes - Princess Aurora
- Street Fighter V - Akira Kazama
- Gunvolt Chronicles: Luminous Avenger iX 2 - Hail
- Arknights - Heidi
- Azur Lane - SMS Yorck
- Gate of Nightmares - Nicole, Olivia
- Da Capo 5 - Akari Shirakawa
- 404 Game Re:set - Altered Beast
- Crymachina - Heim
- D4DJ – Date-chan
- Stella Sora - Nyx

=== Others ===
- Project:;Cold (2022) - C
