= Akari Kageyama =

Japanese voice actress (born 1993)

- 影山 灯
- Born: December 25, 1993 (age 32); Kanagawa Prefecture, Japan
- Occupation: Voice actress
- Years active: 2015–present
- Agent: IAM Agency
- Notable work: Hybrid x Heart Magias Academy Ataraxia as Aine Chidorigafuchi
- Height: 162 cm (5 ft 4 in)

Akari Kageyama (影山 灯, Kageyama Akari; born December 25, 1993) is a Japanese voice actress affiliated with IAM Agency.

== Biography ==
Kageyama has longed for voice actors since she was in elementary school. She has cited them in her future dreams. She also revealed that she imitated a character in Hunter × Hunter. She graduated from the English department at the university.

== Filmography ==
=== Anime ===
- Castle Town Dandelion, Shizuru
- Clione no Akari, Sayaka Hama
- Crane Game Girls Galaxy, Rei
- Date A Live IV, Mukuro Hoshimiya
- Himouto! Umaru-chan, Nana Ebina
- Himouto! Umaru-chan R, Nana Ebina
- How Clumsy you are, Miss Ueno, Yamashita
- Hybrid x Heart Magias Academy Ataraxia, Aine Chidorigafuchi
- Nazotokine, Kyoko Minakami
- Princess Principal, Beatrice

=== Anime films ===
- Princess Principal: Crown Handler, Beatrice

=== Video games ===
- Arknights, Durin, Provence
- Azur Lane, Kako, Furutaka, Aoba, Kinugasa
- Gothic wa Mahou Otome, Nana Ebina and Kanaria (from Rozen Maiden, replacing Yumi Shimura)
- Grand Chase: Dimensional Chaser, Sofia
- GrimGrimoire OnceMore, Opalnaria Rain
- Himouto! Umaru-chan: Ikusei Keikaku, Nana Ebina
