= Ayaka Imamura =

Japanese voice actress

- 今村 彩夏
- Born: August 5, 1993 (age 33); Osaka Prefecture, Japan
- Occupation: Voice actress
- Years active: 2014–2018
- Height: 161 cm (5 ft 3 in)

Ayaka Imamura (今村 彩夏, Imamura Ayaka; born August 5, 1993) is a retired Japanese voice actress from Osaka Prefecture. She was previously affiliated with With Line. On June 29, 2018, her management announced that she would retire from voice acting due to poor health.

== Filmography ==
=== Anime ===
- Akame ga Kill! (2014), Mimi, Prostitute -ep 14, Prostitute B -ep 6
- Invaders of the Rokujouma!? (2014), Yocchan
- One Week Friends (2014), Girl -ep 11
- Wolf Girl & Black Prince (2014), Female Student -ep 2
- Absolute Duo (2015), Miyabi Hotaka
- Aoharu x Machinegun (2015), Female Student
- Aria the Scarlet Ammo AA (2015), Hina Fuma
- Beautiful Bones: Sakurako's Investigation (2015), Yuriko Kogami
- Castle Town Dandelion (2015), Child, Female Student
- Classroom Crisis (2015), Female University Student
- Chaos Dragon (2015), Misuka, Fukkan
- Re-Kan! (2015), Female High School Student
- Divine Gate (2016), Höðr
- Hundred (2016), Meimei
- Magic of Stella (2016), Minaha Iino
- Scorching Ping Pong Girls (2016), Mune Ōmune
- Three Leaves, Three Colors (2016), Teru Hayama
- Princess Principal (2017), Ange
- Takunomi (2018), Michiru Amatsuki

=== Video games ===
- Granblue Fantasy (2014), Robertina
- Raiden V: Director's Cut (2017), Eshiria Portman
- Death end re;Quest (2018), Celica Clayton
