= Aikatsu Stars! ~Progress of the Stars~ =

Upcoming film by Teruo Satō

- Theatrical release poster
- Japanese: アイカツスターズ！ ～星々のProgress～
- Revised Hepburn: Aikatsu Sutāzu! ~Hoshiboshi no Progress~
- Directed by: Teruo Satō
- Screenplay by: Yūko Kakihara
- Based on: Aikatsu Stars! by BN Pictures and Bandai
- Starring: Miyu Tomita; Ayaka Asai; Megumi Yamaguchi; Natsumi Murakami; Yume Miyamoto; Minami Tsuda; Sumire Morohoshi; Azusa Tadokoro; Ayaka Ōhashi; Reina Ueda; Yōko Hikasa; Natsumi Fujiwara; Nako Eguchi; Kaori Maeda
- Production company: BN Pictures
- Distributed by: Bandai Namco Pictures
- Release date: January 22, 2027
- Country: Japan
- Language: Japanese

Aikatsu Stars! ~Progress of the Stars~ (Japanese: アイカツスターズ！ ～星々のProgress～, Hepburn: Aikatsu Sutāzu! ~Hoshiboshi no Progress~) is an upcoming Japanese animated musical film directed by Teruo Satō and written by Yūko Kakihara. The film is based on the Aikatsu Stars! anime television series by BN Pictures and Bandai, and it is also produced and distributed by the former. Progress of the Stars is the second film in the Aikatsu Stars! series, as well as the seventh film in the Aikatsu! franchise overall. The story focuses on Yume and her friends as they compete with other idols in an event known as Venus Jamboree. The film stars the voices of Miyu Tomita, Ayaka Asai, Megumi Yamaguchi, Natsumi Murakami, Yume Miyamoto, Minami Tsuda, Sumire Morohoshi, Azusa Tadokoro, Ayaka Ōhashi, Reina Ueda, Yōko Hikasa, Natsumi Fujiwara, Nako Eguchi and Kaori Maeda. Progress of the Stars will be released in Japan on January 22, 2027.

== Voice cast ==
- Miyu Tomita as Yume Nijino
- Ayaka Asai as Laura Sakuraba
- Megumi Yamaguchi as Koharu Nanakura
- Natsumi Murakami as Ako Saotome
- Yume Miyamoto as Mahiru Kasumi
- Minami Tsuda as Hime Shiratori
- Sumire Morohoshi as Tsubasa Kisaragi
- Azusa Tadokoro as Yuzu Nikaido
- Ayaka Ōhashi as Yozora Kasumi
- Reina Ueda as Lily Shirogane
- Sayaka Nakaya as Haruka☆Ruka
- Yōko Hikasa as Elza Forte
- Natsumi Fujiwara as Rei Kizaki
- Nako Eguchi as Kirara Hanazono
- Kaori Maeda as Aria Futaba
- Taku Yashiro as Subaru Yuki
- Yūto Uemura as Nozomu Igarashi
- Shun Horie as Asahi Kasumi
- Arthur Lounsbery as Kanata Kira
- Daisuke Hirakawa as Hikaru Moroboshi
- Rina Hidaka as Maori
- Takako Tanaka as Alice Carol

== Production ==
In July 2026, it was announced that a second film for the Aikatsu Stars! series was in development. The film focuses on events after Episode 100 and features an original story.

== Release ==
The film will be released in theaters in Japan on January 22.
