= Aikatsu Stars! The Movie =

2016 film by Shin'ya Watada

- Theatrical release poster
- Japanese: 劇場版 アイカツスターズ！
- Revised Hepburn: Gekijōban Aikatsu Sutāzu!
- Directed by: Shin'ya Watada
- Screenplay by: Yūko Kakihara
- Based on: Aikatsu Stars! by BN Pictures and Bandai
- Starring: Miyu Tomita; Ayaka Asai; Megumi Yamaguchi; Natsumi Murakami; Yume Miyamoto; Minami Tsuda; Sumire Morohoshi; Asuza Tadokoro; Ayaka Ōhashi
- Production company: BN Pictures
- Distributed by: Toei Company, Ltd.
- Release date: August 13, 2016
- Running time: 59 minutes
- Country: Japan
- Language: Japanese

Aikatsu Stars! The Movie (Japanese: 劇場版 アイカツスターズ！, Hepburn: Gekijōban Aikatsu Sutāzu!) is a 2016 Japanese animated musical film directed by Shin'ya Watada and written by Yūko Kakihara; the film is based on the anime series of the same name by BN Pictures and Bandai, which the former also produced the film. Distributed by Toei Company, it is the first film for the Aikatsu Stars! series, as well as the third film in the Aikatsu! franchise overall; it focuses on Yume and the others travel from Four Star Academy to a remote island for looking at the Legendary Dress. The film stars the voices of Miyu Tomita, Ayaka Asai, Megumi Yamaguchi, Natsumi Murakami, Yume Miyamoto, Minami Tsuda, Sumire Morohoshi, Azusa Tadokoro, Ayaka Ōhashi. It was released in Japan on August 13, 2016, alongside a double feature short film, Aikatsu! The Targeted Aikatsu Card!.

== Voice cast ==
- Miyu Tomita as Yume Nijino
- Ayaka Asai as Laura Sakuraba
- Megumi Yamaguchi as Koharu Nanakura
- Natsumi Murakami as Ako Saotome
- Yume Miyamoto as Mahiru Kasumi
- Minami Tsuda as Hime Shiratori
- Sumire Morohoshi as Tsubasa Kisaragi
- Asuza Tadokoro as Yuzu Nikaido
- Ayaka Ōhashi as Yozora Kasumi
- Taku Yashiro as Subaru Yuki
- Yūto Uemura as Nozomu Igarashi
- Shun Horie as Asahi Kasumi
- Arthur Lounsbery as Kanata Kira
- Rina Hidaka as Maori
- Daisuke Hirakawa as Hikaru Moroboshi
- Akemi Kanda as Anna Hibiki
- Eimi Okada as Momoko Yachigusa
- Kenta Matsumoto as Dave Satō
- Kazuyuki Okitsu as Tamagorō Miwa

== Production ==
It was first announced on February 22, 2016, along with Aikatsu Stars!'s release.

== Release ==
The film was released in theaters in Japan on August 13, 2016.

== Reception ==
=== Box office ===
The film failed to make it to the top 10 in the Japanese box office
