= Mewkledreamy =

Japanese anime series

- Anime key visual

ミュークルドリーミー (Myūkurudorīmī)
- Genre: Magical girl
- Created by: Sanrio
- Anime television series
- Directed by: Hiroaki Sakurai
- Produced by: Yuuji Matsukura
- Written by: Hiroko Kanasugi
- Music by: Ruka Kawada
- Studio: J.C.Staff
- Original network: TXN (TV Tokyo), AT-X, Kids Station
- Original run: April 5, 2020 – April 4, 2021
- Episodes: 48
- Anime television series

Mewkledreamy Mix!
- Directed by: Hiroaki Sakurai
- Produced by: Yuuji Matsukura
- Written by: Hiroko Kanasugi
- Music by: Ruka Kawada
- Studio: J.C.Staff
- Original network: TXN (TV Tokyo)
- Original run: April 11, 2021 – March 27, 2022
- Episodes: 50

Mewkledreamy (Japanese: ミュークルドリーミー, Hepburn: Myūkurudorīmī) is a character franchise created by Sanrio, illustrated by character designer Mayumi Yanagita. The franchise was officially launched in 2017.

An anime television series adaptation by J.C.Staff aired on TV Tokyo from April 5, 2020, to April 4, 2021. After the series' conclusion, it was followed by a sequel titled Mewkledreamy Mix! from April 11, 2021, to March 27, 2022.

The anime officially ended its run on March 27, 2022.

Following the end of the Mewkldreamy anime, Sanrio announced that Mewkledreamy had been cancelled due to the airing of Waccha Primagi! and would not be renewed for a third season.

== Story ==
=== Franchise ===
Mew is a light violet stuffed kitten created in a world from the sky by doll-making fairies. One day, she fell from the sky and was picked up by a human girl. The girl hugged and spoke with Mew every day. Hoping to express her gratitude to the girl, Mew made a wish to the moon. After the moonlight made Mew's star pattern in her ear shine, she began to be able to speak. Since then, Mew and the girl chat every day. They can have the same dream when they sleep together, while playing and exchanging secrets in the dream. She was born in February 26. Her favorite color is pastel pink.

=== Anime ===
==== Mewkledreamy ====
Yume is a cheerful first-year junior high school student who by chance caught Mew, a speaking kitten plush who fell from the sky. By becoming Dream Partners, Mew possesses the power of "Dream Synchro" and is able to enter one's dream along with Yume. That night, the queen of Miracle Dreamy Kingdom appeared in Yume's dream, telling her that if she and Mew collect a lot of Dreamy Stones, she can grant her one wish. Since then, Yume starts to collect Dreamy Stones with Mew, while enjoying her school life.

==== Mewkledreamy Mix! ====
Yume and Mew are a pair of Dream Partners who can perform Dream Synchro with Dreamy Compass and Mewkle Star. They are having their wonderful daily lives when one day, a baby plush kitten called Chia falls from the sky, and they begin to take care of her. New enemies and a mysterious boy appear, and with the powered-up mischief-loving Yuni messing around and causing trouble, it seems that the key to solve her problems are Mewkle Rain-Bow and everyone's power.

== Characters from anime ==
=== Stuffed kittens ===
Mew (みゅー, Myū)
Voiced by: Aki Toyosaki
The main kitten protagonist, a light violet stuffed kitten. She is a sweet and soft doll, she is afraid of dogs (except Q-chan). She ends her sentences with "~mya". She possesses the power of "Dream Synchro", an ability to enter one's dream. She fell down from the sky one day and was caught by Yume, thus becomes her Dream Partner. In Mix!, she caught Chia, who fell from the sky, and started taking care of her with Yume. It is later revealed that she who caught Chia at the beginning is Chia's Dream Partner, and according to an ancient book, same as Chia, she is also one of the princesses.
Peko (ぺこ, Peko)
Voiced by: Yurika Kubo
A light yellow stuffed kitten. He loves eating and making others laugh. He is Maira's partner. Like Maira, he speaks Kansei dialect. He and Maira makes a comedy duo named "Dasshi♡Fun'nyuu" (lit. "skim milk powder").
Suu (すう, Sū)
Voiced by: Hisako Kanemoto
A light blue stuffed kitten. She is clever and gentle. She ends her sentences with "~desu". She is Kotoko's partner. Her glasses have several abilities, including detecting Black Abysses and watching past events by rewinding time.
Yuni (ゆに, Yuni)
Voiced by: Rie Kugimiya
A black stuffed kitten. He likes mischief, but is also quite clumsy. He is rival of Mew and co.. He created Tsugi and Hagi when he was lonely, and treasures them a lot. He ends his sentences with "~nyui". Working for the Queen of Nightmares, he uses Black Abysses to mess up people's dreams. Like Mew, he is a stuffed kitten from the sky, but was not made by the same fairies who made Mew and co.. After he was dropped to the human world, he was not discovered by anyone and thus was left alone, before the Queen of Nightmares made him become able to move and speak; this made him respect the Queen a lot. In season 1 episode 24, he becomes Haruhito's partner. In the last episode of the season, he left Haruhito for a journey, but returned at the beginning of Mix!.
Tsugi (つぎ, Tsugi)
Voiced by: Misaki Kuno
A stuffed kitten created by Yuni. She likes Yuni a lot. She ends her sentences with "~tsugi".
Hagi (はぎ, Hagi)
Voiced by: Natsumi Fujiwara
A stuffed kitten created by Yuni. He likes Yuni a lot. He ends his sentences with "~hagi".
Nene (ねね, Nene)
Voiced by: Marika Kōno
A pink stuffed kitten. She is cheerful and kind, and likes taking care of others. She is good at dream divination, sports and singing. She loves flowers. She is Tokiwa's partner.
Rei (れい, Rei)
Voiced by: Mutsumi Tamura
A white stuffed kitten. His full name is "Rei de Richard". He calls himself "a prince of a royal family from the country of love". He is Asahi's partner.
Chia (ちあ, Chia)
Voiced by: Kana Ichinose
A pink baby stuffed kitten that debuts in Mix!. She is energetic that can bring smiles to anyone. She loves being hugged. In the later part of the story, it is revealed that she is made to be the princess of Miracle Dreamy Kingdom, and there is the seed of Dreamy Lavender Flower embedded inside her heart.
Pachipachi-Bu (パチパチブー, Pachipachibū)
Voiced by: Hikaru Akao
A stuffed kitten created by Yuni, debuting in Mix!. It was originally a fake plushie used for stealing and replacing Chia, but was made alive after Yuni accidentally inserted Yuni-chi Abyss into it.

=== Humans ===
==== Major ====
Yume Hinata (日向 ゆめ, Hinata Yume)
Voiced by: Natsumi Murakami
The main human protagonist, a cheerful first-year junior high school student who enters the cheerleading club. She owns a dog named "Q-chan". She does not like cherry tomatoes. She by chance catches Mew who fell from the sky, becomes her Dream Partner, and starts collecting Dreamy Stones with her. She promotes to second year in Mix!. In the last part of Mix!, according to an ancient book, same as Chia, she is also one of the princesses.
Maira Tsukishima (月島 まいら, Tsukishima Maira)
Voiced by: Ayasa Itō
A first-year junior high school student who is Yume's classmate and Peko's partner. Coming from Kyoto, she speaks in a Kansai dialect and lives with her father as her mother passed away since her childhood. She is a model of a popular fashion magazine. She knows a lot about fashion, but also loves comedy, hoping to become a comedian one day. She plans to establish a comedy studying club in school. She and Peko makes a comedy duo named "Dasshi♡Fun'nyuu". She promotes to second year in Mix!.
Kotoko Imai (今井 ことこ, Imai Kotoko)
Voiced by: Eri Yukimura
A third-year junior high school student who is Yume's senior and Suu's partner. Her grade is the top of the third-years, and she is the president of the computer club. She is good at taking care of others. Hoping for a society where humans and robots peacefully live together, she and the computer club put effort on creating robots; "Kotokoto" was her first robot. She promotes to high school in Mix!.
Asahi Minamikawa (南川 朝陽, Minamikawa Asahi)
Voiced by: Yūsuke Kobayashi, Yuka Nukui (child)
A first-year junior high school student who is Yume's classmate and neighbour, as well as childhood friend. He is good at sports, and enters the tennis club. He has a crush on Yume. He later becomes Rei's partner. He promotes to second year in Mix!.
Haruhito Sugiyama (杉山 遼仁, Sugiyama Haruhito)
Voiced by: Yuki Ogoe, Miyuri Shimabukuro (child)
A third-year junior high school student who is Yume's senior. He is the president of the boys' tennis club and the student council. He is popular in school. He has a younger brother called Akihito, who has superior intelligence, causing him to always feel inferior around him. Starting from season 1 episode 24, making use of his inferiority towards Akihito, he is controlled by the Queen of Nightmares and becomes Yuni's partner. Obeying the Queen, he begins to interfere Yume and Mew's purification of Black Abysses, as well as to steal Dreamy Stones. However, Haruhito gradually gained his conscience back because of the charm Yuri gave him; thus, the Queen inserted a Black Abyss into him in episode 37, making him completely be on the Queen's side. At the last part of the season, he showed his hostility towards Yume, and was about to erase her memories with Mew, along with his, but was interfered. He then suffered and fell into a coma for fighting his nightmares, striving to keep his precious memories. At the end, it was Yuri's wish and her charm that awakened him, making him back to normal. He promotes to high school in Mix!.
Tokiwa Anzai (安西 ときわ, Anzai Tokiwa)
Voiced by: Fairouz Ai
A first-year junior high school student who is Yume's classmate and Nene's partner. She is a transfer student who comes from the Yamanashi Prefecture. She is excellent at sports, and is also good at playing piano, astronomy and biology. She joins the cheerleading club and the choir club. Before transferring to Yume's school, she discovered Nene by a river. She promotes to second year in Mix!.
Akihito Sugiyama (杉山 亮仁, Sugiyama Akihito)
Voiced by: Yukiyo Fujii
Haruhito's younger brother. He is a child prodigy with IQ of 250, and is currently studying at a university in America even at the age of 12. He becomes one of the main characters in Mix!, enrolling into Ichigo Junior High School to become a first-year student. He enters the computer club and becomes the new president. He hopes that humans can live in a virtual world; to make his dream world come true, he agrees to help Akumu to spread nightmares. He develops a crush on Yume later. In episode 43 of Mix!, after seeing Yume suffered from Akumu, he realized that Akumu's ambition is not what he wants, thus persuaded her to stop spreading nightmares. Akumu stopped working with him afterwards.

==== Junior High School ====
Yuri Sawamura (沢村 百合, Sawamura Yuri)
Voiced by: Kana Ichinose
A third-year junior high school student who is Haruhito's classmate and childhood friend. She is the president of the calligraphy club and the vice-president of the student council. She noticed something was wrong when Haruhito was obeying the Queen of Nightmares, thus asked Yume to check his condition for her, and asked her to give him a charm, named Dreamy Charm, to protect him. At the end of the season, it was her wish and her charm that awakened Haruhito, who was fighting his nightmares, making him back to normal. She got into a high school in London in the finale of the first season, and once returned to Japan in Episode 17 of Mix!.
Wakaba Midorino (緑野 わかば, Midorino Wakaba)
Voiced by: Yuuki Hirose
A first-year junior high school student who is Yume's friend since grade school. She enters the cheerleading club with Yume. She has a crush on Shouhei. She promotes to second year in Mix!, and joins the comedy studying club.
Kaede Akana (赤名 かえで, Akana Kaede)
Voiced by: Ayumi Mano
A first-year junior high school student who is Yume's friend since grade school. She is well-informed on and likes to talk about romance gossips. She enters the tennis club. She seems to have a crush on Teacher Aoi. She promotes to second year in Mix!, and joins the comedy studying club.
Hana Shiraishi (白石 はな, Shiraishi Hana)
Voiced by: Yuka Nukui
A first-year junior high school student who is Yume's friend since grade school. She loves drawing, and enters the art club. She wishes to become a manga artist one day, but her storytelling is not really good. She later owns a cat named "Kuro-chan". She promotes to second year in Mix!, and joins the comedy studying club.
Teacher Aoi (青井先生, Aoi-sensei)
Voiced by: Kazuyuki Okitsu
Yume's class teacher and the teacher of Class 1-1.
Shouhei Kitada (北田 翔平, Kitada Shōhei)
Voiced by: Makoto Furukawa
A first-year junior high school student who is Yume's friend since grade school. He is a good friend of Asahi. He promotes to second year in Mix!.
Momiji Akana (赤名 もみじ, Akana Momiji)
Voiced by: Yō Taichi
A third-year junior high school student who is Kaede's older sister. She is the president of the girls' tennis club.
Misaki Konno (紺野 美咲, Kon'no Misaki)
Voiced by: M・A・O
A third-year junior high school student who is the president of the cheerleading club.
Yui Aida (藍田 結衣, Aida Yui)
Voiced by: Saya Tanaka
A second-year junior high school student who is a member of the cheerleading club who practices with Yume. She is Yume's senior. She later becomes the new president of the cheerleading club, replacing Misaki.
Yoshimi Oshio (押尾 好美, Oshio Yoshimi)
Voiced by: Mayu Mineda
A third-year junior high school student who is the president of the Sugiyama fan club.
Yoshio Maruyama (丸山 ヨシオ, Maruyama Yoshio)
Voiced by: Shōya Chiba
A second-year junior high school student who is a member of the student council. He later becomes the new vice-president of the student council, replacing Yuri.
Suzuko Kakumoto (角本 スズ子, Kakumoto Suzuko)
Voiced by: Maria Sawada
A second-year junior high school student who is a member of the student council. She later becomes the new president of the student council, replacing Haruhito.
Keigo Ozawa (小沢 圭吾, Ozawa Keigo)
Voiced by: Shogo Sakata
A second-year junior high school student who is a member of the boys' tennis club who is Asahi's senior. He later becomes the new president of the boys' tennis club, replacing Haruhito.
Hasegawa (長谷川, Hasegawa)
Voiced by: Natsumi Kawaida
A third-year junior high school student who is the president of the choir club.
Morimura (森村, Morimura)
Voiced by: Manaka Iwami
A first-year junior high school student who is a member of the girls' tennis club. She had a crush on Asahi, but was rejected. She later enters the Sugiyama fan club. She promotes to second year in Mix!, and is in the same class as Yume.
Mika (ミカ, Mika)
Voiced by: Aya Yamane
A first-year junior high school student who is a member of the girls' tennis club. She is Morimura's friend. She later enters the Sugiyama fan club with Morimura. She promotes to second year in Mix!, and is in the same class as Yume.
Teacher Suzanne (スザンヌ先生, Suzan'nu-sensei)
Voiced by: Shizuka Itō
The cheerleading club's advisor. Her actual name is "Suzaki".
Karin Yamabuki (山吹 華鈴, Yamabuki Karin)
Voiced by: Ikumi Hasegawa
A second-year junior high school student who is the new president of the girls' tennis club, replacing Momiji.
Kenji Oyamada (小山田 健二, Oyamada Kenji)
Voiced by: Taichi Kusano
A second-year junior high school student who is a member of the boys' tennis club and Asahi's senior.
Hitoe Takatsu (高津 一絵, Takatsu Hitoe)
Voiced by: Rui Tanabe
She is a member of the art club.
Futami Kusama (草間 二美, Kusama Futami)
Voiced by: Madoka Asahina
She is a member of the art club.
Hiroko Hanabusa (花房 ひろこ, Hanabusa Hiroko)
Voiced by: Momo Ishibashi
A first-year junior high school student who is Yume's classmate. She was jealous of Maira, but later becomes her fan. She promotes to second year in Mix!, and joins the comedy studying club.
Fumiko Amamiya (雨宮 ふみこ, Amamiya Fumiko)
Voiced by: Emiri Suyama
A first-year junior high school student who is Yume's classmate. She was jealous of Maira, but later becomes her fan. She promotes to second year in Mix!, and joins the comedy studying club.
Minako Hoshino (星野 みなこ, Hoshino Minako)
Voiced by: Makoto Koichi
A first-year junior high school student who is Yume's classmate. She was jealous of Maira, but later becomes her fan. She promotes to second year in Mix!, and joins the comedy studying club.
Erito Kurosawa (黒沢 衿人, Kurosawa Erito)
Voiced by: Aoi Ichikawa
A third-year junior high school student who is the former vice-president of the computer club. He is sore at Kotoko for his robot losing to hers, but actually, he has a crush on her.
Suama Shiratama (白玉 すあま, Shiratama Suama)
Voiced by: Natsumi Kawaida
A first-year junior high school student who is Yume's classmate. She is the daughter of the owner of a Japanese sweets shop.

==== Major humans' family ====
Haruna Hinata (日向 はるな, Hinata Haruna)
Voiced by: Yuka Terasaki
Yume's mother. She is the section manager of her company.
Nana Gotou (後藤 なな, Gotō Nana)
Voiced by: Konomi Kohara
Yume's younger cousin.
Kanta Anzai (安西 寛太, Anzai Kanta)
Voiced by: Kotomi Aihara
Tokiwa's younger brother who is Kenta's twin.
Kenta Anzai (安西 健太, Anzai Kenta)
Voiced by: Arisa Sekine
Tokiwa's younger brother who is Kanta's twin.
Ritsu Imai (今井 律, Imai Ritsu)
Voiced by: Atsushi Tamaru
Kotoko's older brother. He studies at a university in America, and once came back to Japan in episode 44. He studies at the same school as Akihito's, and works with him in the laboratory. He returned to Japan again in Mix! with Akihito.
Yuuto (優人, Yuuto)
Voiced by: Yasuaki Takumi
Tokiwa's older cousin. He works at the zoo.

==== Others ====
Naomi (ナオミ, Naomi)
Voiced by: Ryoko Maekawa
A model who is Maira's friend. She became the first victim of Akumu's magic in Mix!.
Himeka Amoto (阿本 姬香, Amoto Himeka)
Voiced by: Sayumi Suzushiro
The daughter of APON Ranch's owner. She is Maira's fan. While Maira was visiting her ranch, she felt inferior because of Maira's charm, causing Yuni to insert Black Abyss into her.
Ai (亜衣, Ai)
Voiced by: Hitomi Ōwada
The daughter of Patisserie Ichigo's owner and Yuuki's younger sister. She attends the same elementary school as Yume's. Due to their family business, their parents cannot hold a Christmas party for them, thus they were envious of others, causing Yuni to insert Yuni-chi Abysses into them. After their Yuni-chi Abysses being purified, they had a party with their parents in their dream, and was invited by the Queen Above the Skies to her castle.
Yuuki (勇気, Yuuki)
Voiced by: Mariko Higashiuchi
The son of Patisserie Ichigo's owner and Ai's older brother. He attends the same elementary school as Yume's. Due to their family business, their parents cannot hold a Christmas party for them, thus they were envious of others, causing Yuni to insert Yuni-chi Abysses into them. After their Yuni-chi Abysses being purified, they had a party with their parents in their dream, and was invited by the Queen Above the Skies to her castle.
Hanasaki (花咲, Hanasaki)
Voiced by: Seiichiro Yamashita
Debuting in Mix!, he is Asahi's opponent in a tennis match. He enjoys playing tennis very much, causing Yuni to insert Yuni-chi Abyss into him.
Asako (麻子, Asako)
Voiced by: Sayaka Senbongi
Debuting in Mix!, she is Kaoru's sister. They met Yume and co. while they are playing instruments in the rain on the hills.
Kaoru (薫, Kaoru)
Voiced by: Haruka Shiraishi
Debuting in Mix!, she is Asako's sister. They met Yume and co. while they are playing instruments in the rain on the hills.

=== Miracle Dreamy Kingdom ===
Lucia / The Queen Above the Skies (ルシア / お空の上の女王さま, Rushia)
Voiced by: Kikuko Inoue
The queen of Miracle Dreamy Kingdom. She appeared in Yume's dream and told her if she can collect a lot of Dreamy Stones with Mew, she can grant her one wish. Lyra/the Queen of Nightmares is her older sister.
Fairies (妖精さん)
Voiced by: Saki Kobari, Misato Matsuoka, Yu-ri Yoshida, Himari Mochida, Reimi, Akari Tadano, Maki Kawase, Nao Fujita
The fairies are the inhabitants of Miracle Dreamy Kingdom, serving the Queen Above the Skies. Instructed by the Queen, they created plush kittens like Mew.
Lyra / The Queen of Nightmares (ライラ / 悪夢の女王様, Raira)
Voiced by: Aya Hisakawa
The antagonist of season 1. She gave life to Yuni, and orders him to spread Black Abysses. She also assigned Haruhito as a partner to Yuni by controlling him, making use of his inferiority towards Akihito. Lucia/the Queen Above the Skies is her younger sister. They were in a good relationship when they were young, but she felt inferior that her sister was more popular around the fairies despite her hard work. After her sister accidentally burnt her pickled radish, she left the kingdom, and became even angrier finding out her sister, after becoming the Queen, seems not to care about her leaving. She then decided to bring nightmares to the human world, thus the making of Yuni. The reason she chose Haruhito is that his experience is similar to hers. At the end of the season, she reconciled with her sister, and moved back to the kingdom, becoming the Queen of the kingdom with her.
Akumu (アクムー, Akumū)
Voiced by: Mikako Takahashi
She appeared in the last part of season 1, and is the antagonist of season 2. She wishes to change hopes and dreams into nightmares, and to build Nightmare Land. About 2000 years ago, she was the queen of Miracle Dreamy Kingdom, originally named Omoro. Loving interesting things, she wanted to build Amusing Land to make everyone feel excited, thus started to collect people's dreams. However, gradually, normal dreams could not satisfy Omoro, so she decided to spread nightmares, changed her name to Akumu, and built Nightmare Land, causing the world to be once covered in nightmares. Nevertheless, she was later sealed in Ichigo Hill, until the end of season 1 when Lyra's Nightmare Castle at the hill was collapsed, releasing Akumu. In Episode 48, she was purified and returned to Omoro.

=== Others ===
Q-chan (きゅうちゃん, Kyū-chan)
Voiced by: Asuna Tomari
A dog owned by the Hinata family. At first, it was scared of by Mew, who is afraid of dogs, but it actually wanted to become her friend; after the events in season 1 episode 9, they finally get closer.
Ponkichi (ポン吉, Ponkichi)
Voiced by: Yumiko Kobayashi
A tanuki who lived on a cape and is now a ghost. He and Poko is a pair of couple, but were separated and he lost his memory after becoming a ghost. With Yume and co.'s help, he retrieved his memory and went to heaven with Poko.
Poko (ポコ, Poko)
Voiced by: Ayaka Saitō
A tanuki who lived on a cape and is now a ghost. She and Ponkichi is a pair of couple, but were separated. In order to retrieve Ponkichi's memory, she borrowed the body of an old woman who is the janitor of Yume's training camp site. In the end, she went to heaven with Ponkichi.
Kuro-chan (くろちゃん, Kuro-chan)
Voiced by: Nobunaga Shimazaki
A black cat which was once a stray animal. It was constantly bullied by a big cat. It met Hana at a park and became familiar with her. After experiencing events caused by Black Abysses with Hana, it became Hana's pet.

== Media ==
=== Anime ===
An anime television series based on the toy franchise was announced at the Sanrio Expo 2019 to be animated by J.C.Staff. Chiaki Kon (Golden Time, Devils and Realist) was to direct the series with Natsumi Murakami be the first cast member to be announced. On September 10, 2019, a promotional video released by Sanrio's YouTube channel introduced additional characters in the anime. On January 31, 2020, the anime's website that the anime would premiere in April. The site also announced ten more cast members and three more staff members, including Hiroko Kanasugi (NouCome, RobiHachi) as writer and Mai Furuki (Planet With) as character designer. However Kon stepped down as director due to unknown issues and will remain in the project as Project Consultant. The directorial role will be filled out by Hiroaki Sakurai (Di Gi Charat, UFO Baby, The Disastrous Life of Saiki K.) instead. On February 27, 2020, the anime was confirmed to be premiere on April 5, 2020, and more cast members and characters, as well as the theme songs were announced. On April 26, 2020, Sanrio announced that episode 5 and later episodes would be delayed due to the COVID-19 pandemic. On May 23, 2020, it was revealed that new episodes would resume on May 31, 2020, with the series continuing until April 4, 2021.

A second season, titled Mewkledreamy Mix!, aired from April 11, 2021, to March 27, 2022, with the staff members returning to reprise their roles.

==== Episode list ====
===== Mewkledreamy =====
No.	Title	Directed by (Note: Information is taken from the ending credits of each episode.)	Written by	Original release date
1	"The Story of the Beginning"; Transliteration: "Hajimari no Sutōrī" (Japanese: はじまりのストーリー)	Miyuki Ishida; Chiaki Kon	Hiroko Kanasugi	April 5, 2020
2	"Trial Club Joining with Dream Synchro"; Transliteration: "Yumeshinkuro de Kari Nyūbu" (Japanese: ユメシンクロで仮入部)	Kōzō Kaihō; Chiaki Kon	Hiroko Kanasugi	April 12, 2020
3	"Let's Enter Senpai's Dream"; Transliteration: "Senpai no Yume ni Haitchao" (Japanese: 先輩の夢に入っちゃお)	Tsuneo Tominaga	Hiroko Kanasugi	April 19, 2020
4	"Another Dreamy Mate?"; Transliteration: "Mōhitori no Dorīmī Meito?" (Japanese: もう一人のドリーミーメイト？)	Tsuneo Tominaga	Hiroko Kanasugi	April 26, 2020
5	"Kotoko and Kotokoto"; Transliteration: "Kotoko to Kotokoto" (Japanese: ことことコトコト)	Yūki Morita	Seishi Minakami	May 31, 2020
6	"The First Mid-Term Test"; Transliteration: "Hajimete no Chūkan Tesuto" (Japanese: はじめての中間テスト)	Miyuki Ishida	Hiroko Kanasugi	June 7, 2020
7	"Hurray! Hurray! Childhood Friend"; Transliteration: "Fure! Fure! Osananajimi" (Japanese: フレッ！フレッ！おさななじみ)	Kiyoshi Murayama	Sayuri Ōba	June 14, 2020
8	"A Big Quarrel in the Camp School!?"; Transliteration: "Rinkan Gakkō de ō Genka!?" (Japanese: 林間学校で大ゲンカ！？)	Tsuneo Tominaga	Hiroko Kanasugi	June 21, 2020
9	"The Melancholy of Q-chan"; Transliteration: "Kyū-chan no Yūutsu" (Japanese: きゅうちゃんのゆううつ)	Kōzō Kaihō	Seishi Minakami	June 28, 2020
10	"Sleepless Yume-chan in a Rainy Day"; Transliteration: "Amefuri Nebusoku Yume-chan" (Japanese: 雨ふりねぶそくゆめちゃん)	Hiroaki Takagi	Chiaki Kon; Hiroaki Inaba	July 5, 2020
11	"Let's Play with Nana-chan"; Transliteration: "Nana-chan to Asobo" (Japanese: ななちゃんとあそぼ)	Osamu Honma; Yūki Morita	Sayuri Ōba	July 12, 2020
12	"I'll Find It First-nyui"; Transliteration: "Oretchi ga Saki ni Mitsukeru Nyui" (Japanese: オレっちが先に見つけるにゅい)	Kiyoshi Murayama	Hiroko Kanasugi	July 19, 2020
13	"Transfer Student Tokiwa-chan"; Transliteration: "Tenkōsei Tokiwa-chan" (Japanese: 転校生ときわちゃん)	Miyuki Ishida	Hiroko Kanasugi	July 26, 2020
14	"Tokiwa-chan's Great Autocracy"; Transliteration: "Tokiwa-chan Dai Sōdatsu" (Japanese: ときわちゃん大争奪)	Tsuneo Tominaga	Sayuri Ōba	August 2, 2020
15	"Heart-Throbbing Fireworks Festival"; Transliteration: "Dokidoki Hanabi Taikai" (Japanese: ドキドキ花火大会)	Kōzō Kaihō	Hiroko Kanasugi	August 9, 2020
16	"I Really am Cheer-Chao!"; Transliteration: "Watashi wa Yappari Chiatchao!" (Japanese: 私はやっぱりチアっちゃお！)	Kiyoshi Murayama	Sayuri Ōba	August 16, 2020
17	"The Treacherous Cherry-Tomatoman"; Transliteration: "Kyōfu no Puchitomatoman" (Japanese: 恐怖のプチトマトマン)	Miyuki Ishida; Yūki Morita	Masahiro Yokotani	August 23, 2020
18	"Don't Go to the Cape"; Transliteration: "Misaki ni Itte wa Ikenai yo" (Japanese: 岬に行ってはいけないよ)	Tsuneo Tominaga	Seishi Minakami	August 30, 2020
19	"Yume-chan's Birthday in the Training Camp"; Transliteration: "O Tanjōbi Yume-chan Gasshuku-chū" (Japanese: お誕生日ゆめちゃん合宿中)	Kōzō Kaihō	Hiroko Kanasugi	September 6, 2020
20	"Bonjour! Rei-kun"; Transliteration: "Bonjūru! Rei-kun" (Japanese: ボンジュール！れいくん)	Hiroaki Takagi	Hiroko Kanasugi	September 13, 2020
21	"Kanta and Kenta's Dream Synchro"; Transliteration: "Kanta to Kenta no Yumeshinkuro" (Japanese: 寛太と健太のユメシンクロ)	Miyuki Ishida	Masahiro Yokotani	September 20, 2020
22	"Sugiyama☆Paradise"; Transliteration: "Sugiyama☆Paradaisu" (Japanese: スギヤマ☆パラダイス)	Kiyoshi Murayama	Sayuri Ōba	September 27, 2020
23	"Hana-chan's Dream"; Transliteration: "Hana-chan no Yume" (Japanese: はなちゃんの夢)	Kōzō Kaihō; Yūki Morita	Yoshiko Nakamura	October 4, 2020
24	"The Powered-Up Cultural Festival"; Transliteration: "Pawā-appu na Bunkasai" (Japanese: パワーアップな文化祭)	Tsuneo Tominaga	Hiroko Kanasugi	October 11, 2020
25	"Dreamy Mates Assemble!"; Transliteration: "Dorīmī Meito Dayo Zen'in Shūgō!" (Japanese: ドリーミーメイトだよ全員集合！)	Tsuneo Tominaga; Chiaki Kon	Hiroko Kanasugi	October 18, 2020
26	"Do Your Childhood Friends Understand It?"; Transliteration: "Osana Najimi ni wa Wakaru no?" (Japanese: おさななじみにはわかるの？)	Kōzō Kaihō	Hiroko Kanasugi	October 25, 2020
27	"Welcome! To the Castle in the Sky"; Transliteration: "Yōkoso! Osora no Ue no o Shiro e" (Japanese: ようこそ！お空の上のお城へ)	Kiyoshi Murayama	Sayuri Ōba	November 1, 2020
28	"Maira My Love ♥"; Transliteration: "Maira Mai Rabu ♥" (Japanese: まいらマイラブ♥)	Miyuki Ishida	Hiroko Kanasugi	November 8, 2020
29	"The Cowardly Pumpkin Man"; Transliteration: "Kowagari no Kabocha-san" (Japanese: こわがりのカボチャさん)	Tsuneo Tominaga	Masahiro Yokotani	November 15, 2020
30	"Yomi and Mukki"; Transliteration: "Yomī to Mukkī" (Japanese: ヨミーとムッキー)	Kōzō Kaihō; Yūki Morita	Sayuri Ōba	November 22, 2020
31	"Nervous Yume-chan on a Date"; Transliteration: "Dēto de Dokidoki Yume-chan" (Japanese: デートでドキドキゆめちゃん)	Hiroaki Takagi	Yoshiko Nakamura	November 29, 2020
32	"Their Birthday is Uno Uno One-Five!"; Transliteration: "Tanjōbi wa Wan Wan Ichi Gō!" (Japanese: 誕生日はワンワンいちごー！)	Kōzō Kaihō	Hiroko Kanasugi	December 6, 2020
33	"Hope it can be Reached, Dreamy Charm"; Transliteration: "Todoku to Ii na Dorīmī Chāmu" (Japanese: 届くといいな ドリーミーチャーム)	Kiyoshi Murayama	Sayuri Ōba	December 13, 2020
34	"To the Ranch with Maira-chan"; Transliteration: "Maira-chan to Bokujō e" (Japanese: まいらちゃんと牧場へ)	Miyuki Ishida	Yoshiko Nakamura	December 20, 2020
35	"Wish Upon the Shooting Stars ☆"; Transliteration: "Nagareboshi ni Onegai ☆" (Japanese: 流れ星にお願い☆)	Tsuneo Tominaga	Masahiro Yokotani	December 27, 2020
36	"Be Happy with Everyone in the Holiday Season!"; Transliteration: "Nenmatsu Nenshi wa Minna de Happī!" (Japanese: 年末年始はみんなでハッピー！)	Kōzō Kaihō; Yūki Morita	Hiroko Kanasugi	January 10, 2021
37	"Sugiyama-senpai's Secret"; Transliteration: "Sugiyama-senpai no Himitsu" (Japanese: 杉山先輩のひみつ)	Tsuneo Tominaga	Hiroko Kanasugi	January 17, 2021
38	"Don't Let Go of Mew-chan!"; Transliteration: "Myū-chan o Hanasanai!" (Japanese: みゅーちゃんを離さない！)	Miyuki Ishida	Hiroko Kanasugi	January 24, 2021
39	"Rock Pebble & Stones"; Transliteration: "Rokku Peburu Ando Sutōnzu" (Japanese: ロック・ぺブル&ストーンズ)	Kiyoshi Murayama	Seishi Minakami	January 31, 2021
40	"Snowman, Don't Melt"; Transliteration: "Yukidaruma-san Tokenaide" (Japanese: 雪だるまさん溶けないで)	Kōzō Kaihō	Yoshiko Nakamura	February 7, 2021
41	"Distributing Valentine's Japanese Sweets!"; Transliteration: "Barentain Wagashi Kubatchao!" (Japanese: バレンタイン和菓子配っちゃお！)	Hiroaki Takagi	Masahiro Yokotani	February 14, 2021
42	"Suddenly a Stone Treasure!"; Transliteration: "Otakara Ishi wa Totsuzen ni!" (Japanese: おたから石は突然に！)	Kōzō Kaihō; Yūki Morita	Sayuri Ōba	February 21, 2021
43	"Cheer On Your Seniors!"; Transliteration: "Senpai-tachi ni Chiatchao!" (Japanese: 先輩たちにチアっちゃお！)	Kiyoshi Murayama	Sayuri Ōba	February 28, 2021
44	"Ackey is Back!"; Transliteration: "Akkī ga Kaette Kita!" (Japanese: アッキーが帰って来た！)	Miyuki Ishida; Chiaki Kon	Hiroko Kanasugi	March 7, 2021
45	"Was it a Nightmare Castle?"; Transliteration: "Akumu no O-shiro Datta ka mo?" (Japanese: 悪夢のお城だったかも？)	Hiroaki Takagi	Sayuri Ōba	March 14, 2021
46	"Queen and Queen"; Transliteration: "Joō-sama to Joō-sama" (Japanese: 女王さまと女王様)	Kōzō Kaihō	Hiroko Kanasugi	March 21, 2021
47	"Yume-chan's Dream"; Transliteration: "Yume-chan no Yume" (Japanese: ゆめちゃんの夢)	Tsuneo Tominaga	Hiroko Kanasugi	March 28, 2021
48	"Congratulations on Your Graduation Admission!"; Transliteration: "Sotsugyō Nyūgaku Omedetō!" (Japanese: 卒業入学おめでとう！)	Miyuki Ishida; Kōzō Kaihō	Hiroko Kanasugi	April 4, 2021

===== Mewkledreamy Mix! =====
No.	Title	Directed by	Written by	Original release date
1	"We Did a Dream Synchro!"; Transliteration: "Yumeshinkuro Dekichatta!" (Japanese: ユメシンクロできちゃった！)	Kōzō Kaihō; Miyuki Ishida	Hiroko Kanasugi	April 11, 2021
2	"Yuni-kun Leaves it to the Wind"; Transliteration: "Yuni-kun wa Kaze Makase" (Japanese: ゆにくんは風まかせ)	Yūki Morita; Miyuki Ishida	Hiroko Kanasugi	April 18, 2021
3	"Happy Birthday Tokiwa-chan"; Transliteration: "Happī Bāsudei Tokiwa-chan" (Japanese: ハッピーバースデイときわちゃん)	Shigeki Awai	Hiroko Kanasugi	April 25, 2021
4	"Icchy & Naru Have Arrived!"; Transliteration: "Itchī Ando Naru ga Yatte Kita!" (Japanese: いっちー&なるがやってきた！)	N/A	N/A	May 2, 2021
5	"Chia-chan Babu♡"; Transliteration: "Chia-chan Babū♡" (Japanese: ちあちゃんばぶー♡)	Kōzō Kaihō	Hiroko Kanasugi	May 9, 2021
6	"A Bunch of Babies"; Transliteration: "Aka-chan ga Ippai" (Japanese: 赤ちゃんがいっぱい)	Tsuneo Tominaga	Sayuri Ōba	May 16, 2021
7	"Let's Have Fun, Asahi"; Transliteration: "Tanoshimō yo Asahi" (Japanese: たのしもうよ朝陽)	Miyuki Ishida	Masahiro Yokotani	May 23, 2021
8	"IcchyNaru's Paper-Cutting Challenge!"; Transliteration: "Ichi Naru to Kiri-e ni Chōsen!" (Japanese: いちなると切り絵に挑戦！)	N/A	N/A	May 30, 2021
9	"We're Taking on a Comedy Grand Prix!"; Transliteration: "Owarai Guran Puri Shutsujō Suru de!" (Japanese: お笑いグランプリ出場するで！)	Miyoshi Nakakawane	Sayuri Ōba	June 6, 2021
10	"It's More Fun on Outdoors!"; Transliteration: "Autodoatte Tanoshii!" (Japanese: アウトドアって楽しい！)	Yūki Morita; Kōzō Kaihō	Yoshiko Nakamura	June 13, 2021
11	"We're Gonna Have a Party-nyui!"; Transliteration: "Pāti Yatchau Nyui!" (Japanese: パーティやっちゃうにゅい！)	Hiroaki Takagi	Hiroko Kanasugi	June 20, 2021
12	"IcchyNaru's Drawing Challenge!"; Transliteration: "Ichi Naru to O-ekaki ni Chōsen!" (Japanese: いちなるとお絵描きに挑戦！)	N/A	N/A	June 27, 2021
13	"It's More Brimmingly Joyful in the Milky Way!"; Transliteration: "Amanogawa wa Wakuwaku Kirakira!" (Japanese: 天の川はワクワクキラキラ！)	Kōzō Kaihō	Hiroko Kanasugi	July 4, 2021
14	"The Brimming Fireworks Display in the Skies"; Transliteration: "Osora ga Kirakira Hanabi Taikai" (Japanese: お空がキラキラ花火大会)	Miyuki Ishida; Kōzō Kaihō	Sayuri Ōba	July 11, 2021
15	"Cleaning is Twinkly Happy!"; Transliteration: "Ōsōji de Pikapika Happī!" (Japanese: 大そうじでピカピカハッピー！)	Miyuki Ishida	Masahiro Yokotani	July 18, 2021
16	"IcchyNaru's Cheerful Challenge!"; Transliteration: "Ichi Naru to Chiafuru ni Chōsen!" (Japanese: いちなるとチアふるに挑戦！)	N/A	N/A	July 25, 2021
17	"Long Time No See Yuri-senpai"; Transliteration: "Ohisashiburi Desu Yuri-senpai" (Japanese: お久しぶりです百合先輩)	Tsuneo Tominaga	Hiroko Kanasugi	August 1, 2021
18	"IcchyNaru & Mewkledreamy Mix!"; Transliteration: "Ichi Naru to Myūkurudorīmī Mikkusu!" (Japanese: いちなるとミュークルドリーミー みっくす！)	N/A	N/A	August 8, 2021
19	"Happy Birthday Yume-chan in this Year's Training Camp"; Transliteration: "Kotoshi mo Otanjōbi Yume-chan Gasshuku-chū" (Japanese: 今年もお誕生日ゆめちゃん合宿中)	Yūki Morita; Miyuki Ishida	Yoshiko Nakamura	August 15, 2021
20	"IcchyNaru's Clay Modeling Challenge!"; Transliteration: "Ichi Naru to Nendozaiku ni Chōsen!" (Japanese: いちなると粘土細工に挑戦！)	N/A	N/A	August 22, 2021
21	"I Wish I Could Give her a Present"; Transliteration: "Boku mo Purezento Agetai nā" (Japanese: 僕もプレゼントあげたいなぁ)	Kōzō Kaihō	Hiroko Kanasugi	August 29, 2021
22	"Ichigo Town Sweets Contest"; Transliteration: "Ichigo Chō Suwītsu Kontesuto" (Japanese: 一五町スウィーツコンテスト)	Hiroaki Takagi	Sayuri Ōba	September 5, 2021
23	"Don Shagaran on the Banks of the River!"; Transliteration: "Kawa no Hotori de Don Shagaran!" (Japanese: 川のほとりでドンシャガラン！)	Miyuki Ishida	Masahiro Yokotani	September 12, 2021
24	"The Secret Room Above the Sky"; Transliteration: "Osora no Ue no Himitsu no Oheya" (Japanese: お空の上のヒミツのお部屋)	Miyuki Ishida; Daisuke Chiba	Yoshiko Nakamura	September 19, 2021
25	"IcchyNaru's AI Robot Challenge!"; Transliteration: "Ichi Naru to Ē Ai Robo ni Chōsen!" (Japanese: いちなるとAIロボに挑戦！)	N/A	N/A	September 26, 2021
26	"Akumu-chan Pwease Take It~"; Transliteration: "Akumū-chan ni Dōjo～" (Japanese: アクムーちゃんにどうじょ～)	Kōzō Kaihō	Hiroko Kanasugi	October 3, 2021
27	"Sports Land is Also Dreamy"; Transliteration: "Supōtsu Rando mo Dorīmī" (Japanese: スポーツランドもドリーミー)	Hidehiko Kadota	Hiroko Kanasugi	October 10, 2021
28	"My Love from Kyoto♡"; Transliteration: "Kyōto de Mai Rabu♡" (Japanese: 京都でマイラブ♡)	Miyuki Ishida	Hiroko Kanasugi	October 17, 2021
29	"Akku Akku Halloween Akkumu!"; Transliteration: "Aku Aku Harowin Akkumū!" (Japanese: あくあくハロウィンあっくむー！)	Yūki Morita; Miyuki Ishida	Sayuri Ōba	October 24, 2021
30	"IcchyNaru's Banana Challenge!"; Transliteration: "Ichi Naru to Banana ni Chōsen!" (Japanese: いちなるとバナナに挑戦！)	N/A	N/A	October 31, 2021
31	"Apopopon at the Comedy Land"; Transliteration: "Owarai Rando de Apopo no Pon" (Japanese: お笑いランドであぽぽのぽん)	Kōzō Kaihō	Masahiro Yokotani	November 7, 2021
32	"This Year's Doubles' One-One-One-Five"; Transliteration: "Kotoshi wa Daburu de Wan Wan Ichigō" (Japanese: 今年はダブルでワンワンいちごー)	Fumio Maezono	Yoshiko Nakamura	November 14, 2021
33	"Bonjour Castle is Glittering"; Transliteration: "Bonjūru-jō wa Kirakira sā" (Japanese: ボンジュール城はキラキラさぁ)	Fukutarō Hattori; Kōzō Kaihō	Sayuri Ōba	November 21, 2021
34	"IcchyNaru's Senryu Challenge!"; Transliteration: "Ichi Naru to Senryū ni Chōsen!" (Japanese: いちなると川柳に挑戦！)	N/A	N/A	November 28, 2021
35	"Su-chan's Splendid Glasses Land"; Transliteration: "Sū-chan no Suteki Megane Rando" (Japanese: すうちゃんのステキメガネランド)	Miyuki Ishida	Yoshiko Nakamura	December 5, 2021
36	"Don't Throw the Trash"; Transliteration: "Gomi Gomi Gomīn to Sutenai de" (Japanese: ゴミゴミゴミーンと捨てないで)	Yūki Morita; Miyuki Ishida	Masahiro Yokotani	December 12, 2021
37	"A Bunch of Santa!"; Transliteration: "Santa-san ga I～ppai!" (Japanese: サンタさんがい～っぱい！)	Tatsuji Yamazaki	Hiroko Kanasugi	December 19, 2021
38	"IcchyNaru's "Card" Making Challenge!"; Transliteration: "Ichi Naru to "Karuta" Tsukuri ni Chōsen!" (Japanese: いちなると「かるた」作りに挑戦！)	N/A	N/A	December 26, 2021
39	"I Have Something Important to Say!"; Transliteration: "Daiji na Koto Itchaima～su!" (Japanese: 大事なこと言っちゃいま～す！)	Kōzō Kaihō	Hiroko Kanasugi	January 9, 2022
40	"IcchyNaru's "Miracle" Challenge!"; Transliteration: "Ichi Naru to "Mirakuru" ni Chōsen!" (Japanese: いちなると「ミラクル」に挑戦！)	N/A	N/A	January 16, 2022
41	"Everyone Protect the Princess!"; Transliteration: "Minna de Purinsesu Mamotchao!" (Japanese: みんなでプリンセス守っちゃお！)	Shigeo Koshi	Sayuri Ōba	January 23, 2022
42	"IcchyNaru's "Kotokoto" Challenge!"; Transliteration: "Ichi Naru to "Kotokoto" ni Chōsen!" (Japanese: いちなると「コトコト」に挑戦！)	N/A	N/A	January 30, 2022
43	"We're Gonna Have a Replacement-nyui!"; Transliteration: "Irekae Sakusen Yatchau Nyui!" (Japanese: 入れ替え作戦やっちゃうにゅい！)	Miyuki Ishida	Masahiro Yokotani	February 6, 2022
44	"Akumu-chan and Valentine"; Transliteration: "Akumū-chan mo Barentain" (Japanese: アクムーちゃんもバレンタイン)	Kōzō Kaihō	Hiroko Kanasugi	February 13, 2022
45	"We Are the Saint Charlulu!"; Transliteration: "Bokutachi San Sharuru Desu!" (Japanese: ボクたちサンシャルルです！)	Yūki Morita; Kōzō Kaihō	Hiroko Kanasugi	February 20, 2022
46	"IcchyNaru's "Mew-chan" Challenge?"; Transliteration: "Ichi Naru ga "Myū-chan" to Chōsen?" (Japanese: いちなるが「みゅーちゃん」と挑戦？)	N/A	N/A	February 27, 2022
47	"The Dream Partner has Found!"; Transliteration: "Dorīmu Pātonā Miitsuketa!" (Japanese: ドリームパートナー見いつけた！)	Miyuki Ishida	Hiroko Kanasugi	March 6, 2022
48	"The 3 Princesses Assemble!"; Transliteration: "Sannin Sorotte Purinsesu〜" (Japanese: 三人そろってプリンセス〜)	Kōzō Kaihō	Hiroko Kanasugi	March 13, 2022
49	"A Bunch of Brimmingly Joy!"; Transliteration: "Wakuwaku Kirakira ga Ippai!" (Japanese: わくわくキラキラがいっぱい！)	Miyuki Ishida; Kōzō Kaihō	Hiroko Kanasugi	March 20, 2022
50	"Curl, Curl, It Surely Comes!"; Transliteration: "Kuru Kuru Kitto Kuru～" (Japanese: くるくるきっとくる～)	Miyuki Ishida	N/A	March 27, 2022

=== Music ===
Maria Sawada performed both the first season's opening theme "Mirai Kuru Kuru Yume Kururu!" (Japanese: ミライくるくるユメくるる！; "Future's Coming, Dream's Coming!") and the ending theme "Tokimeki Collector" (Japanese: トキメキコレクター, Hepburn: Tokimeki Korekutā; "Excitement Collector"). The series's music is composed by Ruka Kawada (Is the Order a Rabbit?).

For the second season, Mix!, Icchy & Naru performed both the opening theme "Hurray! Hurray! Dreamy Jump" (Japanese: フレー!フレー!ドリーミージャンプ, Hepburn: Furē! Furē! Dorīmījanpu) and the ending theme "Daisuki Sekai" (Japanese: ダイスキセカイ; "The Lovely World").

=== Manga ===
A tie-in manga adaptation is being serialized in two of Kodansha's magazines, Otomodachi and Tanoshii Yōchien, since April 2020 issue.
