= List of animated feature films of 2027 =

This is a list of animated feature films scheduled for release in 2027.

== List ==
Title	Country	Director	Production company	Animation technique	Notes	Release date	Duration
Aibolit	Russia	Alexey Zamyslov	Cinema Foundation of Russia; Voronezh Animation Studio	Traditional		May 13, 2027	90 minutes
Aikatsu Stars! ~Progress of the Stars~	Japan	Teruo Satō	BN Pictures	Traditional		January 22, 2027	
Ally	South Korea; United Kingdom	Bong Joon-ho	4th Creative Party; Barunson C&C; Penture Invest	Computer		July 14, 2027	
The Amazing Maurice 2: The Waters of Life	United States; United Kingdom; Germany; Canada	Toby Genkel	Ulysses Filmproduktion; Studio Rakete; Cantilever Media; Narrativia; Sky; Moonshot Films; Red Star 3DMM; Squeeze Animation Studio	Computer		TBA	
Animal Crackers 2: The Next Batch	United States; Spain	Scott Christian Sava; Dean Lorey	BlueDream Studios; Méliès Producciones Cinematográficas; Plano Sujetivo; B Water Animation Studios; Side Street Studios; ZaZa Rev Motion Pictures	Computer		TBA	
Animal Friends	United States	Peter Atencio	Warner Bros. Pictures; Legendary Pictures; Maximum Effort; Prime Focus	Computer; Live-action		January 22, 2027	
Baahubali: The Eternal War – Part 1	India	Ishan Shukla	Arka Media Works; Alcyde; Aniventure; Les Androids Associes; Mihira Visual Labs; Zaratan	Computer		June 10, 2027	
Bagpuss	United Kingdom	TBA	Threewise Entertainment	Computer; Live-action		TBA	
Bad Fairies	United Kingdom; United States	Megan Nicole Dong	Warner Bros. Pictures Animation; Locksmith Animation	Computer		May 21, 2027	
A Banquet for Hungry Ghosts	Singapore; Taiwan; Ireland; India; Indonesia	Ervin Han	Robot Playground Media; Toonz Media Group; Xanthus Animation; Kucing Hitam Pictures	Traditional		TBA	90 minutes
The Bluey Movie	Australia; United Kingdom	Joe Brumm	Disney; BBC Studios; Ludo Studio	Computer		August 6, 2027	
BoBoiBoy Movie 3: Ghost of Gur'latan	Malaysia	Nizam Razak	Animonsta Studios; Astro Shaw	Computer		TBA	
Bollywoof	Ireland; United Kingdom	Frederik Du Chau	Embankment Films; La Parti Production; Newscope Films; Good Story Productions; BFI; Cantilever Media; Mikros Animation; Sky Cinema	Computer		January 22, 2027	104 minutes
Boonie Bears: Inseparable	China	Ma Kangjie; Qu Caijia	Fantawild Animation	Computer		February 6, 2027	
Bottanix	Belgium; Spain	Benoit Godbout	Pink Parrot Media; Umedia; Vivi Film; CarpeDiem Film & TV	Computer		Q1 2027	82 minutes
The Brothers Gruff go on a Holiday; Bukkene Bruse drar til Syden	Norway	Rune Spaans	Qvisten Animation	Computer		February 12, 2027	
Buds	United States	TBA	Columbia Pictures; Sony Pictures Animation	Computer		December 22, 2027	
Charlie vs. the Chocolate Factory	United States	Jared Stern; Elaine Bogan	Netflix Animation Studios; Roald Dahl Story Company	Computer		November 5, 2027	
Cheburashka 3	Russia	Dmitry Dyachenko	Yellow, Black and White; START Studio; Soyuzmultfilm; Russia-1; CTC Media; Cinema Fund	Computer; Live-action		January 1, 2027	
Cherry and Virgin	Japan	Masanao Kawajiri	Toei Video Company	Traditional		July 18, 2026 (Fantasia Film Festival); 2027	87 minutes
CoComelon: The Movie	United States; United Kingdom	Kathleen Thorson Good	Universal Pictures; DreamWorks Animation; Moonbug Entertainment; Prime Focus Studios; DNEG Animation; Flywheel Media	Computer		February 19, 2027	
The Credits Roll into the Sea	Japan	Taichi Ishidate	Kyoto Animation	Traditional		TBA	
Dino Alert - The Ogglies Strike Back	Germany	Toby Genkel; Jens Møller	DenverMP; Gretels Gold; Studio 100 Film	Computer		June 17, 2027	78 minutes
Doraemon: Nobita's Steam-Powered Time Machine	Japan	Rushio Moriyama	Shin-Ei Animation	Traditional		March 5, 2027	
The Eminence in Shadow: Lost Echoes	Japan	Kazuya Nakanishi	Nexus; Kadokawa Animation	Traditional		TBA	
Felix the Brave	Austria	Ali Samadi Ahadi	Red Parrot Studios; Little Dream Entertainment; Amour Fou Luxembourg	Computer		September 9, 2027	90 minutes
The Fixies and Aliens; Фиксики и инопланетяне	Russia	Boris Chertkov; Ivan Pshonkin	Aeroplane JSC; Cinema Foundation of Russia	Computer		August 12, 2027	
Flamingo Flamenco	Spain; Germany; Ireland	Rob Sprackling; Raúl Garcia	Studio 100; 3 Doubles Producciones	Computer		May 14, 2027	80 minutes
Frozen 3	United States	Jennifer Lee	Disney; Walt Disney Animation Studios	Computer		November 24, 2027	
Gatto	United States	Enrico Casarosa	Walt Disney Pictures; Pixar Animation Studios	Traditional; Computer		March 5, 2027	
Ghost	Japan	Shingo Natsume	Bandai Namco Filmworks; Madhouse	Traditional		November 1, 2026 (Tokyo International Film Festival); February 11, 2027	110 minutes
Goldbeak 2	China	TBA	Suzhou Pegasus Liangzi Film	Computer		TBA	
Guardian Rabbits: The Secret of the Golden Egg	Germany	Ute von Münchow-Pohl	Akkord Film; ARX Anima; Seru Animation	Computer		February 25, 2027	
Gummibär & Friends: Operation Cotton Candy	India; Ireland; United Kingdom	Pete Dodd	Toonz Media Group; Gummybear International; Telegael; Space Age Films	Computer		TBA	90 minutes
Gus, the Guide Dog	Spain; Portugal	Roger Torras	WKND; Bígaro Films; Nu Boyana Portugal	Computer		April 2, 2027	75 minutes
Haikyu!! The Movie: vs. the Little Giant	Japan	Susumu Mitsunaka	Production I.G	Traditional		TBA	
The Haunting of Hotel Transylvania	United States	Jennifer Kluska; Alan Hawkins	Columbia Pictures; Sony Pictures Animation; Amazon MGM Studios	Computer		October 8, 2027	
High in the Clouds	United States; France; United Kingdom	Toby Genkel	Gaumont Animation; MPL Communications; Unique Features; PolyGram Entertainment	Computer		October 13, 2027 (France)	90 minutes
How to Train Your Dragon 2	United States	Dean DeBlois	Universal Pictures; DreamWorks Animation	Computer; Live-action		June 11, 2027	
Hui Boo And The Curse Of The Genies	Germany	Sebastian Niemann	Rat Pack Filmproduktion; Mack Animation herbX film Constantin Film	Computer		October 28, 2027	85 minutes
Ice Age: Boiling Point	United States	John C. Donkin	20th Century Studios; 20th Century Animation	Computer		February 5, 2027	
Kokdu	South Korea	Kim Tae-yong	Locus Animation	Computer		TBA	90 minutes
Lascars 2: Family Business	France	Laurent Nicolas	Millimages	Traditional		September 1, 2027	96 minutes
The Last Dinosaur	France; United Kingdom	Federico Milella; Ben Smith	Red Star 3D; Fantabulous; Film Constellation; Fabrique d'images	Computer		March 25, 2027	85 minutes
The Last Dodo	Australia; United Kingdom	Jun Falkenstein	Studio 100 Film; Cheeky Little Media; Cantilever Media	Computer		Q4 2027	85 minutes
Les chiens ne font pas des chats	Canada; France; Belgium	Alain Gagnol	Parmi les lucioles films Kaïbou Production Inc. Umedia	Traditional		TBA	80 minutes
Lovebirds	France	Hélène Blanchard; Laurent Bru	TAT Productions	Computer		January 27, 2027	90 minutes
Love Live! Nijigasaki High School Idol Club Final Chapter Part 3	Japan	Tomoyuki Kawamura	SUNRISE; Bandai Namco Filmworks	Traditional		February 5, 2027	
Malusha and the Enchanted Prince; Малуша и заколдованный царевич	Russia	Maksim Kulikov	Atmosfera Kino; Soyuzmultfilm; CGF	Computer		August 19, 2027	85 minutes
Margie Claus	United States	Kirk DeMicco	Warner Bros. Pictures; Warner Bros. Pictures Animation; On the Day Productions	Computer		November 12, 2027	
Medalist Movie	Japan	Yasutaka Yamamoto	ENGI	Traditional		February 19, 2027	
A Minecraft Movie Squared	United States	Jared Hess	Warner Bros. Pictures; Legendary Pictures; Vertigo Entertainment; On the Roam; Mojang Studios	Computer; Live-action		July 23, 2027	
Minibots	United States; United Kingdom; India	Tony Bancroft	Toonz Media Group; Evolutionary Films; Mojo Global Arts	Computer		July 23, 2027	90 minutes
Monkey King: A Hero's Journey to the West	China	Phil Nibbelink	Stars Collective; Shanghai Golden Network Culture & Media Co. Ltd. The Monk Studio; Living Drawings; Golden Network Asia	Computer		March 14, 2027	
Monkey Quest	Japan; United States	David N. Weiss; Stephanie Ma Stine; Takao Noguchi	Toei Animation; Sola Digital Arts	Computer		TBA	99 minutes
The Myth of Maracuda 2: Sugar Age	Russia	Viktor Glukhushin	CTB Film Company; Skazka Animation Studio; Cinema Foundation of Russia	Computer		April 29, 2027	
The New Simpsons Movie	United States	TBA	20th Century Studios; Gracie Films; 20th Century Animation	Traditional		September 3, 2027	
Niu Lai 2: Setting Sail	China	Xin Yumeng	Dalian Jingyuan Culture Film and Television Media	TBA		TBA	
Not Alone	United States	Eric Guillon; Claire Dodgson; Jonathan Del Val	Universal Pictures; Illumination	Computer		April 16, 2027	
Untitled nWave Studios film	France; Belgium	Jean-Paul Gaultier	nWave Studios	TBA		TBA	
On the Edge	United States	Octavio Rodriguez	Studio 100 Film; Studio 100 International; Viva Pictures; On The Edge Animation A.I.E. Able & Baker; Monkeys & Dinos; Telegael	Computer		May 6, 2027	75 minutes
One Piece Film: God Valley	Japan	Masashi Koizuka	Toei Animation	Traditional		Summer 2027	
The Outcast: Mianshan Blood Battle	China	TBA	Beijing Menggu Culture Media Co., Ltd.	Traditional		TBA	
Phoenix & I	China	TBA	WinSing Animation	Computer		TBA	
Pierre the Pigeon-Hawk	United States; Ireland; India	Tara Whitaker; John D. Eraklis	Toonz Media Group; Gold Valley Films; Telegal; Exodus Media Group; Sugar Water Entertainment	Computer		February 13, 2027	90 minutes
Pirate Mo and the Legend of the Red Ruby; Seeräubermoses	Germany	Florian Westermann	Letterbox Filmproduktion; Ulysses Filmproduktion; ARX Anima	Computer		April 29, 2027	85 minutes
Pleasant Goat and Big Big Wolf: Dunk for Future 2	China	Huang Weiming; Huang Junming	Creative Power Entertaining; Alpha Group Co., Ltd.	Traditional		TBA	
Pokémon: Wild Card	Japan	Katsuhiko Kitada	Story Inc. CloverWorks	Traditional		TBA	
Raggie New Adventure; Sipsik Uued Seiklused	Estonia	Meelis Arulepp	A. Film Production; Copenhagen Bombay; Eesti Kultuurkapital; Estonian Film Institute; ACME Film	Computer		September 24, 2027	
Shrek 5	United States	Conrad Vernon; Walt Dohrn	Universal Pictures; DreamWorks Animation	Computer		June 30, 2027	
Sidi Kaba and the Gateway Home	France	Rony Hotin	Special Touch Studios; Paul Thiltges Distributions	Traditional		April 14, 2027	90 minutes
Sonic the Hedgehog 4	United States; Japan	Jeff Fowler	Paramount Pictures; Original Film; Sega; Blur Studio; Marza Animation Planet	Computer; Live-action		March 19, 2027	
Spider-Man: Beyond the Spider-Verse	United States	Bob Persichetti; Justin K. Thompson	Columbia Pictures; Sony Pictures Animation; Arad Productions; Lord Miller Productions; Pascal Pictures	Traditional; Computer		June 18, 2027	
Untitled Teenage Mutant Ninja Turtles: Mutant Mayhem sequel	United States	Jeff Rowe	Paramount Pictures; Paramount Animation; Nickelodeon Movies; Point Grey Pictures	Computer		August 13, 2027	
Toxic: Miracle of The Jungle	Spain; Peru	Jose Zelada; César Zelada	Tunche Films	Computer		TBA	
Twisted	France; Italy	Lino DiSalvo	Mediawan Kids & Family; Palomar; Dwarf Animation Studio	Computer		May 27, 2027	83 minutes
The Unicorn That Said No	Germany	Marc-Uwe Kling	Studio Soi; X Filme Creative Pool; Warner Bros. Film Productions Germany	Computer		January 1, 2027	75 minutes
Unstable	Canada; United States; Spain	David Freedman; Benoît Godbout	Pink Parrot Media; CarpeDiem Film & TV; Cantilever Media; Animar Media Studio; Capitán Araña	Computer		TBA	85 minutes
Wasted Chef	Japan	Takayuki Hirao	CLAP	Traditional		TBA	119 minutes
Wings of Freedom	France	Laurent Zeitoun	StudioCanal; Good Hero	Computer		April 7, 2027	
Wish Dragon 2	China; United States	Chris Bremble	Netflix; Sony Pictures Animation; Base FX	Computer		TBA	
The Wolf; Le Loup	France	Benjamin Massoubre; Fursy Tessier	Xilam; Bidibul Productions	Computer; Traditional		April 2027	
Yakari: Brave Heart	France; Belgium	Xavier Giacometti	Dargaud Media; Belvision; France 3 Cinéma; Pan Animation; Ellipse Studios	Computer		May 6, 2027	85 minutes
Zac Power	United States; Australia; New Zealand	Alexs Stadermann; David Webster	Paramount Pictures; Cheeky Little Media; Flying Bark Productions; Pixel Zoo Animation Studios; Studio 100 Film; Australian Children's Television Foundation; Screen Australia; Viva Kids	Computer		January 7, 2027	84 minutes
Zoonicorn: The Original Dreamer	United States	Mike Johnson; J’net Smith	Zoonicorn, LLC; Dream Mechanics Entertainment	Computer		Q4 2027	90 minutes
