= List of Aikatsu Stars! episodes =

Aikatsu Stars! is a Japanese anime television series produced by BN Pictures, and the successor to the original Aikatsu! anime series based on Bandai's Data Carddass arcade machines. The story follows a girl named Yume Nijino who enrolls at Yotsuboshi Gakuen (Four Star Academy) in order to become a top idol and join the popular group S4 which she admires. The series began airing on TV Tokyo from April 7, 2016, succeeding the original Aikatsu! anime series in its initial timeslot. For the first 25 episodes, the opening theme is "Start Line!" (スタートライン!, Sutāto Rain!) by Sena and Rie from AIKATSU☆STARS!, while the ending theme is "episode Solo" by Ruka, Nanase, Kana, and Miho from AIKATSU☆STARS!. From episode 26 onwards, the opening theme is "1, 2, Sing For you!" by Sena, Rie, Miki and Kana. From episode 34 till episode 50 the opening theme is "STAR JET!" (スタージェット！Sutā Jetto!) by Sena, Rie, Kana and Miki. The ending theme from episode 26 till episode 50 is "So Beautiful Story" by Ruka and Sena. In season 2, the opening themes are "STARDOM!" and "MUSIC OF DREAM!!!", both by Sena, Rie, Kana and Miki while the ending themes are "Bon Bon Voyage" by Miho from AIKATSU✩STARS and Risa, and "Pirouette of the Forest Light" by Sena and Ruka from AIKATSU✩STARS.

== Episode list ==
=== Season 1 ===
No.	Title	Original airdate
1	"The Beginning of a Dream"; Transliteration: "Yume no Hajimari" (Japanese: ゆめのはじまり)	April 7, 2016
2	"The Two are Rivals!"; Transliteration: "Futari wa Raibaru!" (Japanese: ふたりはライバル！)	April 14, 2016
3	"Towards the Sky of My Color"; Transliteration: "Watashi Iro no Sora e" (Japanese: 私色の空へ)	April 21, 2016
4	"Always 100%!"; Transliteration: "Itsudatte Hyaku Pāsento!" (Japanese: いつだって100％！)	April 28, 2016
5	"My Dress Make!"; Transliteration: "Mai Doresu Meiku!" (Japanese: マイドレスメイク！)	May 5, 2016
6	"Rock! Rock Girls!" (Japanese: ROCK! ロックガールズ!)	May 12, 2016
7	"Simple is the Best!" (Japanese: シンプル イズ ザ ベスト!)	May 19, 2016
8	"A Tiny Glimmer"; Transliteration: "Chiisa-na Kagayaki" (Japanese: 小さな輝き)	May 26, 2016
9	"Miracle Girls!" (Japanese: ミラクルガールズ!)	June 2, 2016
10	"Yume's Start Line!"; Transliteration: "Yume no Sutāto Rain!" (Japanese: ゆめのスタートライン!)	June 9, 2016
11	"Close Contact! A Day in the Life of Hime Shiratori"; Transliteration: "Mitchaku! Shiratori Hime no Ichinichi" (Japanese: 密着!白鳥ひめの一日)	June 16, 2016
12	"Soaring Girlfriend♪"; Transliteration: "Habataku Gārufurendo" (Japanese: はばたくガールフレンド♪)	June 23, 2016
13	"Little Fairy Story"; Transliteration: "Ritoru Fearī Monogatari" (Japanese: リトルフェアリー物語)	June 30, 2016
14	"Mahiru's Challenge!"; Transliteration: "Mahiru no Kettō!" (Japanese: 真昼の決闘!)	July 7, 2016
15	"Moon and Sun"; Transliteration: "Tsuki to Taiyō" (Japanese: 月と太陽)	July 21, 2016
16	"Miracle Baton Touch" (Japanese: ミラクルバトンタッチ)	July 28, 2016
17	"The Serious Switch!"; Transliteration: "Honki no Suitchi!" (Japanese: 本気のスイッチ！)	August 4, 2016
18	"Together with Yuri-chan"; Transliteration: "Yuri-chan to Issho" (Japanese: ゆりちゃんと一緒)	August 11, 2016
19	"Midsummer Top Dancer☆"; Transliteration: "Manatsu no Toppu Dansā" (Japanese: 真夏のトップダンサー☆)	August 18, 2016
20	"Passion and Pride"; Transliteration: "Jōnetsu to Puraido" (Japanese: 情熱とプライド)	August 25, 2016
21	"The Desire to Win"; Transliteration: "Kachitai Kimochi" (Japanese: 勝ちたい気持ち)	September 1, 2016
22	"The Road to Her Hero"; Transliteration: "Akogare e Tsuzuku Michi" (Japanese: 憧れへ続く道)	September 8, 2016
23	"Descent of the Tundra Diva"; Transliteration: "Tsundora no Otohime Kōrin" (Japanese: ツンドラの音姫降臨)	September 15, 2016
24	"Smile is Rainbow☆"; Transliteration: "Egao wa Nanairo" (Japanese: 笑顔はなないろ☆)	September 22, 2016
25	"Broadway☆Dream"; Transliteration: "Burōdowei Dorīmu" (Japanese: ブロードウェ☆イドリーム)	September 29, 2016
26	"A Dream That Can't Be Taken"; Transliteration: "Ubaenai Yume" (Japanese: 奪えない夢)	October 6, 2016
27	"The Tale of a Tiny Dress"; Transliteration: "Chiisana no Doresu no Monogatari" (Japanese: 小さなのドレスの物語)	October 13, 2016
28	"Halloween★Magic"; Transliteration: "Harowin★Majikku" (Japanese: ハロウィン★マジック)	October 20, 2016
29	"True Rivals"; Transliteration: "Hontō no Raiburu" (Japanese: 本当のライブル)	October 27, 2016
30	"Rainbow Candy"; Transliteration: "Nanairo no Kyandi" (Japanese: 七色のキャンディ)	November 3, 2016
31	"Take Flight, Sky-Girl!"; Transliteration: "Habatake, Sukai-Gāru!" (Japanese: はばたけ, SKY-GIRL!)	November 10, 2016
32	"Go Forth, Yuzukoshou!"; Transliteration: "Susume, Yuzukoshō!" (Japanese: 進め, ゆずこしょう!)	November 17, 2016
33	"Lost Rola!?"; Transliteration: "Maigo no Rōra!?" (Japanese: 迷子のローラ!?)	November 24, 2016
34	"Make Up Girl Lesson"; Transliteration: "Oshare Gāru Ressun" (Japanese: おしゃれガールレッスン)	December 1, 2016
35	"The Selected Stars"; Transliteration: "Erabareshi Hoshi Tachi" (Japanese: 選ばれし星たち)	December 8, 2016
36	"Beyond the Rainbow"; Transliteration: "Niji no Mukō e" (Japanese: 虹の向こうへ)	December 15, 2016
37	"An Exciting Christmas!"; Transliteration: "Dokidoki! Kurisumasu" (Japanese: トキメキ!クリスマス)	December 22, 2016
38	"Aikatsu New Year!" (Japanese: アイカツニューイヤー！)	January 5, 2017
39	"Yottsuboshi Academy in Danger!?"; Transliteration: "Yottsuboshi Gakuen, Kiki Ippatsu!?" (Japanese: 四ツ星学園、危機一髪！？)	January 12, 2017
40	"Chase After the Princess Diamond!!"; Transliteration: "Purinsesu Daiya o Oe!!" (Japanese: プリンセスダイヤを追え！！)	January 19, 2017
41	"Burn! Star Catching Festival!"; Transliteration: "Moero! Hoshitori Fesu!" (Japanese: 燃えろ! 星取りフェス)	January 26, 2017
42	"The Two Childhood Friends"; Transliteration: "Osananajimi no Futari" (Japanese: 幼馴染の二人)	February 2, 2017
43	"A Song Choc-full of Affection"; Transliteration: "Chokotto Uta ni Komeru Omoi" (Japanese: チョコっと歌にこめる想い☆)	February 9, 2017
44	"Premonitions of Spring♪"; Transliteration: "Haru no Yokan" (Japanese: 春の予感♪)	February 16, 2017
45	"Ako, Headlong!"; Transliteration: "Ako, Masshigura!" (Japanese: あこ、まっしぐら!)	February 23, 2017
46	"Fiery S4 Selection!"; Transliteration: "Honō no S4 Ketteisen!" (Japanese: 炎のS4決定戦!)	March 2, 2017
47	"Kasumi Sisters, Battle!"; Transliteration: "Kasumi Shimai, Taiketsu!" (Japanese: 香澄姉妹、対決!)	March 9, 2017
48	"My Only Song"; Transliteration: "Watashi Dake no Uta" (Japanese: わたしだけの歌)	March 16, 2017
49	"Become the Top Star"; Transliteration: "Ichiban Boshi ni Nare" (Japanese: 一番星になれ)	March 23, 2017
50	"The Greatest Live"; Transliteration: "Saikyō no LIVE" (Japanese: 最強のLIVE)	March 30, 2017

=== Season 2 ===
No.	Season No.	Title	Original airdate
51	01	"Perfect Idol Elsa"; Transliteration: "Pāfekuto Aidoru Eruza" (Japanese: パーフェクトアイドル エルザ)	April 6, 2017
52	02	"The Targeted Idol!?"; Transliteration: "Nerawareta Aidoru!?" (Japanese: 狙われたアイドル!?)	April 13, 2017
53	03	"Open Sesame! Obtain the Star Wings!"; Transliteration: "Ōpun Sesami! Hoshi no Tsubasa o Te ni Irero!" (Japanese: オープンセサミ!星のツバサを手に入れろ!)	April 20, 2017
54	04	"Kirara ☆ The Fluffy Idol"; Transliteration: "Kirara, Fuwafuwa~ na Aidoru" (Japanese: きらら☆フワフワ～なアイドル」)	April 27, 2017
55	05	"All Aboard ☆ Venus Ark!"; Transliteration: "Itchao, Vīnasu Āku!" (Japanese: 行っちゃお☆ヴィーナスアーク！)	May 4, 2017
56	06	"Kya! Warning☆"; Transliteration: "Kya! to Chūihō" (Japanese: キャッ!と注意報)	May 11, 2017
57	07	"Shining ☆ A Good Day For a Stroll"; Transliteration: "Kirakira ☆ Osanpo Biyori" (Japanese: キラキラ☆お散歩日和)	May 18, 2017
58	08	"Miracle Audition!" (Japanese: ミラクルオーディション!)	May 25, 2017
59	09	"Shine For You"; Transliteration: "Anata ni Mo Kagayaki o" (Japanese: あなたにも輝きを)	June 1, 2017
60	10	"Stop Contact! A Day in the World of Elsa Forte"; Transliteration: "Micchaku! Eruza Forute no Sekai" (Japanese: 密着!エルザフォルテの世界)	June 8, 2017
61	11	"Feelings of Love!"; Transliteration: "Suki! tte Kimochi" (Japanese: 好き!って気持ち)	June 15, 2017
62	12	"With Going My Way ♪"; Transliteration: "Gōingu Mai Wei de ♪" (Japanese: ゴーイング・マイウェイで♪)	June 22, 2017
63	13	"A Hot Wind From the Tundra"; Transliteration: "Tsundora kawa Fuku Atsui Kaze" (Japanese: ツンドラから吹く熱い風)	June 29, 2017
64	14	"Wish Upon A Star"; Transliteration: "Hoshi ni Negai o" (Japanese: 星に願いを)	July 6, 2017
65	15	"Hop On ♪ Venus Wave"; Transliteration: "Notte ko ♪ Vīnasu Wēbu" (Japanese: 乗ってこ♪ヴィーナスウェーブ)	July 20, 2017
66	16	"Give an Eel"; Transliteration: "Ēru o Okurou" (Japanese: エールを送ろう)	July 27, 2017
67	17	"Summer! The Pool! A Treasure Hunt☆"; Transliteration: "Natsu da! Pūru da! Takara Sagashi dazo" (Japanese: 夏だ!プールだ!宝探しだゾ☆)	August 3, 2017
68	18	"Venus Ark's Sca~ry Rumor!"; Transliteration: "Vīnasu Āku no Kowa~i Uwasa!" (Japanese: ヴィーナスアークのこわ～いウワサ!)	August 10, 2017
69	19	"Expand, Aikatsu's "WAH"!"; Transliteration: "Hirogeyō, Aikatsu no 「WA」!" (Japanese: 広げよう、アイカツの「ＷＡ」!)	August 17, 2017
70	20	"Jungle Activities!"; Transliteration: "Janguru Katsudō!" (Japanese: ジャングルカツドウ!)	August 24, 2017
71	21	"Goodbye, Koharu-chan!?"; Transliteration: "Sayonara, Koharu-chan!?" (Japanese: さよなら,小春ちゃん!?)	August 31, 2017
72	22	"Their Brightest Star☆"; Transliteration: "Futari no Ichiban Boshi" (Japanese: 二人の一番星☆)	September 7, 2017
73	23	"Rainbow Dress"; Transliteration: "Niji no Doresu" (Japanese: 虹のドレス)	September 14, 2017
74	24	"Fluffy Puffy ☆ Friends"; Transliteration: "Fuwamoko Furenzu" (Japanese: ふわもこ☆レンズ)	September 21, 2017
75	25	"The Kasumi Family's Day Off"; Transliteration: "Kasumi-ke no Kyūjitsu" (Japanese: 香澄家の休日)	September 29, 2017
76	26	"The Fairy Idol, Aria Futaba♪"; Transliteration: "Yōsei Aidoru Futaba Aria" (Japanese: 妖精アイドル 双葉アリア♪)	October 6, 2017
77	27	"Through Flower Language♪"; Transliteration: "Hana Kotoba ni Nosete" (Japanese: 花言葉にのせて♪)	October 12, 2017
78	28	"Welcome Perfect Mother!"; Transliteration: "Yōkoso Pāfekuto Mazā!" (Japanese: ようこそ パーフェクトマザー！)	October 19, 2017
79	29	"Halloween Surprise"	October 26, 2017
80	30	"Rei Kizaki's Oath!"; Transliteration: "Rei Kizaki no Ubau!" (Japanese: 騎咲レイの誓う！)	November 2, 2017
81	31	"Finding a Nice S"; Transliteration: "Suteki na S o Sagashite" (Japanese: ステキなＳを探して)	November 9, 2017
82	32	"Aikatsu Fall in Love"; Transliteration: "Koisuru Aikatsu" (Japanese: 恋するアイカツ)	November 16, 2017
83	33	"Lillie and the Prince"; Transliteration: "Riryi to Ōji-sama" (Japanese: リリィと王子様)	November 23, 2017
84	34	"Dream Together"; Transliteration: "Yume wa Issho ni" (Japanese: 夢は一緒に)	November 30, 2017
85	35	"Passing on the Radiance"; Transliteration: "Kagayaki wo Watasou" (Japanese: 輝きを渡そう)	December 7, 2017
86	36	"Nothing but the Number of Tears"; Transliteration: "Namida no Kazu dake" (Japanese: 涙の数だけ)	December 14, 2017
87	37	"Thank You♪ Merry Christmas!"; Transliteration: "Arigatou♪ Merikuri!" (Japanese: ありがとう♪メリクリ！)	December 21, 2017
88	38	"It's New Year ☆ All Members Gathered!"; Transliteration: "Oshougatsu dazo☆ Zen'in shuugou!" (Japanese: お正月だゾ☆全員集合！)	January 4, 2018
89	39	"Diary of the Stars"; Transliteration: "Hoshiboshi no Daiarī" (Japanese: 星々のダイアリー)	January 11, 2018
90	40	"Venus Crisis" (Japanese: ヴィーナス クライシス！)	January 18, 2018
91	41	"Hustle Idol Training"; Transliteration: "Hassuru Aidoru Shugyō" (Japanese: ハッスル アイドル修行)	January 25, 2018
92	42	"Our episode Solo"; Transliteration: "Watashi-tachi no episōdo soro" (Japanese: 私たちのエピソード ソロ)	February 1, 2018
93	43	"The Sword of Light"; Transliteration: "Hikari no Tsurugi" (Japanese: 光の剣)	February 8, 2018
94	44	"Mahiru's Radiance"; Transliteration: "Mahiru no Kagayaki" (Japanese: 真昼の輝き)	February 15, 2018
95	45	"The Lonely Sun"; Transliteration: "Kodoku na Taiyō" (Japanese: 孤独な太陽)	February 22, 2018
96	46	"Shining Together!"; Transliteration: "Min'na de Kagayaku!" (Japanese: みんなで輝く！)	March 1, 2018
97	47	"Bon Bon Voyage！"	March 8, 2018
98	48	"Yuzu and Lillie"; Transliteration: "Yuzu tto Riryi" (Japanese: ゆずっとリリィ)	March 15, 2018
99	49	"The Things We Both Forgot"; Transliteration: "Futari no Wasuremono" (Japanese: ふたりの忘れ物)	March 22, 2018
100	50	"To the Unseen Future"; Transliteration: "Mada minu mirai e" (Japanese: まだ見ぬ未来へ)	March 29, 2018
