= WorldEnd =

Japanese light novel series and its franchise

- WorldEnd: What Do You Do at the End of the World? Are You Busy? Will You Save Us?
- The cover of the first light novel, featuring Chtholly

終末なにしてますか？ 忙しいですか？ 救ってもらっていいですか？ (Shūmatsu Nani Shitemasu ka? Isogashii Desu ka? Sukutte Moratte Ii Desu ka?)
- Light novel
- Written by: Akira Kareno
- Illustrated by: Ue
- Published by: Kadokawa Shoten
- English publisher: NA: Yen Press
- Imprint: Kadokawa Sneaker Bunko
- Original run: November 1, 2014 – April 1, 2016
- Volumes: 5 + 1 side story
- Light novel

Shūmatsu Nani Shitemasu ka? Mō Ichido dake, Aemasu ka?
- Written by: Akira Kareno
- Illustrated by: Ue
- Published by: Kadokawa Shoten
- Imprint: Kadokawa Sneaker Bunko
- Original run: April 1, 2016 – July 30, 2021
- Volumes: 11
- Manga
- Written by: Akira Kareno
- Illustrated by: Kaname Seu
- Published by: Media Factory
- Magazine: Monthly Comic Alive
- Original run: June 27, 2016 – May 26, 2018
- Volumes: 4
- Anime television series
- Directed by: Jun'ichi Wada
- Produced by: Atsushi Itō
- Written by: Akira Kareno; Mariko Mochizuki; Shingo Nagai; Toshizo Nemoto
- Music by: Tatsuya Kato
- Studio: Satelight; C2C
- Licensed by: Crunchyroll; SA/SEA: Muse Communication
- Original network: Tokyo MX, KBS, AT-X, TV Aichi, Sun TV, TVQ, BS11
- English network: SEA: Animax Asia
- Original run: April 11, 2017 – June 27, 2017
- Episodes: 12
- Light novel

Shūmatsu Nani Shitemasu ka? Iden: Leila Asprey
- Written by: Akira Kareno
- Illustrated by: Ue
- Published by: Kadokawa Shoten
- Imprint: Kadokawa Sneaker Bunko
- Original run: June 1, 2019 – June 1, 2020
- Volumes: 2
- icon

WorldEnd, short for What Do You Do at the End of the World? Are You Busy? Will You Save Us? (終末なにしてますか？ 忙しいですか？ 救ってもらっていいですか？, Shūmatsu Nani Shitemasu ka? Isogashii Desu ka? Sukutte Moratte Ii Desu ka?), also known as SukaSuka, is a Japanese light novel series written by Akira Kareno and illustrated by Ue. The series' first volume was published by Kadokawa Shoten under their Sneaker Bunko imprint on November 1, 2014, with the series ending with the release of the fifth volume in April 2016. A sequel series titled Shūmatsu Nani Shitemasu ka? Mō Ichido dake, Aemasu ka? (終末なにしてますか？もう一度だけ、会えますか？), also known as SukaMoka, began publication with the release of the first volume in April 2016.

== Plot ==
It has been over 500 years since the human race was wiped out by the fearsome and mysterious "Beasts". The surviving races now make their homes on floating islands in the sky to stay out of reach of all but the most mobile Beasts. Only a group of young girls, dubbed the Leprechauns, can wield the ancient Dug Weapons needed to fend off invasions from those dangerous creatures. Into the people's unstable and fleeting lives, where a simple call to certain death could come at any moment, enters an unlikely character: a mysterious man who lost everything in his final battle 500 years ago and awoke from a long, icy slumber.

Unable to fight any longer, the man, Willem, becomes a father figure for the girls, caring for and nurturing them while struggling to adjust to his new life, in which he feels the pain of waiting for his loved ones to return home from battle, as his 'Daughter' once felt for him so long ago. Together, Willem and the leprechauns gradually come to understand what family means and what is truly worth protecting in their lives.

== Characters ==
Willem Kmetsch (ヴィレム・クメシュ, Viremu Kumeshu)
Voiced by: Ryōhei Arai (Japanese); Micah Solusod (English)
Willem is the main protagonist and only "alive" emnetwihts (人間族(エムネトワイト), 'human'; from Anglo-Saxon) being in a world where humans have been driven to extinction by creations they call "Beasts". Known as the Black Agate Swordmaster, he is later found under a frozen lake after being cursed to petrifaction for five hundred years by the poteau (地神(ポトー), 'earthly deity') Ebon Candle. He continues his fight against the Beasts, this time as the adviser to the "Fairies", since his body is too damaged to wield a Weapon after his battle with Eboncandle. As an active fighter he once wielded Percival, a mass produced version of the Dug Weapons (once called Carillons).
Chtholly Nota Seniorious (クトリ・ノタ・セニオリス, Kutori Nota Seniorisu)
Voiced by: Azusa Tadokoro (Japanese); Amber Lee Connors (English)
Chtholly is one of the Leprechauns (黄金妖精(レプラカーン), lit. 'golden fairy') who can use Weapons. She inherited the Weapon Seniorious, which once belonged to Lillia, a brave from Willem's past. She develops feelings for Willem when she meets him for the first time.
Ithea Myse Valgulious (アイセア・マイゼ・ヴァルガリス, Aisea Maize Varugarisu)
Voiced by: Machico (Japanese); Brittney Karbowski (English)
Ithea is a Leprechaun who has her hair styled like cat ears. She has a happy-go-lucky personality, and often jokes that Willem only likes girls of her age; but she hides her true identity. She is the wielder of the Dug Weapon called Valgulious.
Nephren Ruq Insania (ネフレン・ルク・インサニア, Nefuren Ruku Insania)
Voiced by: Akari Uehara (Japanese); Alexis Tipton (English)
Nephren is a Leprechaun who rarely shows emotions. She cares for Willem and helps him a great deal but often sticks to him for some unknown reason. She loves flowers. She is the wielder of the Dug Weapon called Insania.
Rhantolk Ytri Historia (ラーントルク・イツリ・ヒストリア, Rāntoruku Itsuri Hisutoria)
Voiced by: Kazusa Aranami (Japanese); Leah Clark (English)
A Leprechaun wielding the Dug Weapon Historia. She loves to read poems and speaks in a poetic tone.
Nopht Keh Desperatio (ノフト・ケー・デスペラティオ, Nofuto Kē Desuperatio)
Voiced by: Inori Minase (Japanese); Felecia Angelle (English)
A Leprechaun wielding the Dug Weapon Desperatio. She loves meat, and shows brutality when killing Beasts.
Tiat Siba Ignareo (ティアット・シバ・イグナレオ, Tiatto Shiba Igunareo)
Voiced by: Tomomi Mizuma (Japanese); Lara Woodhull (English)
A young, battle-ready Leprechaun, but never paired with a Dug Weapon. She is a fan of romantic movies.
Pannibal Nox Katena (パニバル・ノク・カテナ, Panibaru Noku Katena)
Voiced by: Yurika Kubo (Japanese); Sarah Wiedenheft (English)
A Leprechaun, always ready for a fight. She attacked Willem with a wooden sword while he is on his way to the warehouse to report for duty.
Lakhesh Nyx Seniorious (ラキシュ・ニクス・セニオリス, Rakishu Nikusu Seniorisu)
Voiced by: Manaka Iwami (Japanese); Jill Harris (English)
A clumsy and shy Leprechaun kid who is often seen with Tiat, Collon, and Pannibal.
Collon Rin Purgatorio (コロン・リン・プルガトリオ, Koron Rin Purugatorio)
Voiced by: Hina Kino (Japanese); Kristi Rothrock (English)
An energetic Leprechaun who always speaks with exclamations.
Almita (アルミタ, Arumita)
Voiced by: Akane Kohinata (Japanese); Jad Saxton (English)
A Leprechaun who fell in a ravine but remained indifferent to her injuries, which made Willem question his true mission in the Warehouse and Facility.
Nygglatho (ナイグラート, Naigurāto)
Voiced by: Kikuko Inoue (Japanese); Jamie Marchi (English)
A Troll (喰人鬼(トロール) 'man-eating demon'), she lusts after Willem's flesh, but represses it. In the same way that Willem represents the military, she represents the Guild in securing the Facility. She knows Willem well because she led the expedition that found him in a petrified state.
Grick Graycrack (グリック・グレイクラック, Gurikku Gureikurakku)
Voiced by: Shigeru Chiba (Japanese); Bryan Massey (English)
A goblin (緑鬼族(ボーグル) 'green demon') who works as a salvager for artifacts on The Surface (the land below the sky islands where the Beasts are), a risky job. He wants Willem to join the Army. He was with Rhan and Nopht on the surface on an artifact recovery mission.
Limeskin (ライムスキン, Raimusukin)
Voiced by: Jūrōta Kosugi (Japanese); Christopher R. Sabat (English)
A Reptilian (爬虫種(レプトレイス)) officer. Willem refers to him as "The Lizard."
Almaria Duffner (アルマリア・デュフナー, Arumaria Dyufunā)
Voiced by: Satomi Satō (Japanese); Bryn Apprill (English)
Willem's last mention before he became petrified, probably one of the children he cared for.
Phyracorlybia Dorio (フィラコルリビア・ドリオ, Firakoruribia Dorio)
Voiced by: Honoka Inoue (Japanese); Tia Ballard (English)
She is the Lycanthrope (狼徴人(リュカントロポス)) daughter of the mayor of the sky island city named Corna di Luce who asks Limeskin, who, in turn, asks Willem, to help against a group of activists, but due to his connections with the military, they cannot intervene in political matters, and since Willem is "busy with babysitting."
Lillia Asplay (リーリァ・アスプレイ, Rīria Asupurei)
Voiced by: Rina Satō (Japanese); Giovannie Cruz (English)
A high ranking brave from Willem's past who once wielded Seniorious.
Souwong Kandel (スウォン・カンデル, Suwon Kanderu)
Voiced by: Mugihito (Japanese); Charlie Campbell (Older), Ryan Reynolds (younger) (English)
Willem's former partner from 500 years ago. He died after a suicide attack and became an barrowwiht (喪死者()), enabling Willem to disable a powerful poteau named Eboncandle (黒燭公(イーボンキャンドル)). Before his death he cursed himself, altering his life force in the process, stripping him of his humanity but giving him immortality. In this new state he will not die of injury or age. He has a deep fascination over white capes, and is called Great Sage by Willem and Eboncandle. Souwong, later working together with Eboncandle, created the Sky Archipelago of floating islands over 500 years ago to protect the remaining survivors from the beasts lurking on The Surface.
Elq Hrqstn (エルク・ハルクステン, Eruku Harukusuten)
Voiced by: Hikari Okada (Japanese); Monica Rial (English)
She is Visitor (星神(ヴィジトルス), 'star deity'), who are said to have created the world, but has the appearance of a young girl.

== Media ==
=== Light novels ===
The light novel series is written by Akira Kareno with illustrations by Ue, the first volume was published on November 1, 2014, under Kadokawa Sneaker Bunko imprint and the fifth and last volume was released on April 1, 2016. A side story was released on February 1, 2017. The sequel series started with the first volume released on April 1, 2016 (the same day the last original series volume was released), and the eleventh and last volume was published on July 30, 2021. A two-volume side story, Leila Asprey, was released in 2019 and 2020.

During their panel at Anime NYC 2017, Yen Press announced that they have licensed the light novel.

==== SukaSuka ====
No.	Original release date	Original ISBN	English release date	English ISBN
1	November 1, 2014	978-4-04-102269-6	July 31, 2018	978-1-97-532687-6
2	January 1, 2015	978-4-04-102270-2	November 13, 2018	978-1-97-532688-3
3	July 1, 2015	978-4-04-103288-6	March 19, 2019	978-1-97-532691-3
4	January 1, 2016	978-4-04-103835-2	July 23, 2019	978-1-97-532693-7
5	April 1, 2016	978-4-04-104039-3	December 10, 2019	978-1-97-532695-1
EX	February 1, 2017	978-4-04-105179-5	July 21, 2020	978-1-97-530872-8

==== SukaMoka ====
No.	Japanese release date	Japanese ISBN
1	April 1, 2016	978-4-04-104040-9
2	July 1, 2016	978-4-04-104655-5
3	December 1, 2016	978-4-04-104656-2
4	April 1, 2017	978-4-04-104657-9
5	October 1, 2017	978-4-04-104658-6
6	June 1, 2018	978-4-04-106867-0
7	December 1, 2018	978-4-04-107549-4
8	November 1, 2019	978-4-04-107550-0
9	November 1, 2020	978-4-04-109163-0
10	July 1, 2021	978-4-04-111410-0
11	July 30, 2021	978-4-04-111609-8

==== Sukasuka Side Story: Leila Asprey ====
No.	Japanese release date	Japanese ISBN
1	June 1, 2019	978-4-04-108256-0
2	June 1, 2020	978-4-04-109171-5

=== Manga ===
Kaname Seu launched a manga adaptation of the series in Kadokawa's seinen manga magazine Monthly Comic Alive on June 27, 2016. The manga ended on May 26, 2018.

No.	Japanese release date	Japanese ISBN
1	February 23, 2017	978-4-04-069040-7
2	June 23, 2017	978-4-04-069249-4
3	December 22, 2017	978-4-04-069580-8
4	June 23, 2018	978-4-04-069883-0

=== Anime ===
An anime adaptation of WorldEnd was announced with the release of the second volume of SukaMoka. The anime adaptation was revealed as a television series that would premiere in April 2017. The series was directed by Jun'ichi Wada at studios Satelight and C2C, with scripts written by series creator Akira Kareno, Mariko Mochizuki, Shingo Nagai and Toshizo Nemoto, and music composed by Tatsuya Kato.

The opening theme is "Dearest Drop" sung by Azusa Tadokoro. The ending theme is "From" by True, "Kinema" by True in episode 6 and "Ever be my love" by Tamaru Yamada in episode 12. Additionally, "Scarborough Fair" and "Always in My Heart" by Tamaru Yamada were played in episodes 1 and 12, as well as "I Call You" (In the released music collection, the name of this song was changed to "Call you") by Tamaru Yamada in episode 9.

The anime aired on April 11, 2017, on Tokyo MX, with further broadcasts on TV Aichi, Sun TV, TVQ Kyushu Broadcasting, BS11, and AT-X then finished on June 27, 2017. The series ran for 12 episodes. Crunchyroll streamed the series, and Funimation released it on home video with an English dub. Following Sony's acquisition of Crunchyroll, the dub was moved to Crunchyroll. Muse Communication licensed the series in South and Southeast Asia and streamed it on their YouTube channel.

No.	Title (Note: All English titles are taken from Crunchyroll.)	Original release date
1	"Broken Chronograph"; Transliteration: "Taiyō no Katamuita Kono Sekai de" (Japanese: 太陽の傾いたこの世界で (lit. In this twilight world) -broken chronograph-)	April 11, 2017
In a flashforward, a young red-haired girl named Chtholly describes her love for a man before jumping off an airship to her death. In the present day, within a town inhabited by beastmen, Chtholly – now with blue hair – runs through a marketplace chasing after a cat that has stolen her pendant. She slips off a bridge, but is caught and saved by a man who also recovers her pendant. To avoid hostility from the beastmen, Chtholly spends the day with the man, Willem, before being escorted away by mysterious guards led by a lizard-man. Willem later ventures to a pub, where he is given military work to be the caretaker an armory on a floating island, which he reluctantly accepts. Arriving late at night, Willem is confused to find that the island, rather than holding weapons, is instead the home to several young girls (including Chtholly, who is noticeably older than most of them), whose maid is a troll acquaintance of his named Nygglatho. Willem, who has unspecified experience with kids, decides to stay on the job despite previous hires having quit after just one day. Just as he is getting ready for bed, Chtholly reveals that the reason the armory doesn't holds weapons is because the girls are the weapons. In a post-credits scene set 526 years earlier, a teenage Willem is tended to by a young girl who refers to him as her father just before a grand battle; the narrator reveals that Willem never returned home, and within a year humanity became extinct.
2	"Late Autumn Night's Dream"; Transliteration: "Sora no Ue no Mori no Naka no" (Japanese: 空の上の森の中の (lit. In the forest in the sky) -late autumn night's dream-)	April 18, 2017
Willem introduces himself to all the girls, but they cower from him due to never having spent time around men. He eventually befriends two of the ones Chtholly's age, Ithea and Nephren, and manages to win the rest over by cooking for them. Ithea teases Chtholly for having feelings for Willem. While watching the girls play dodgeball, one falls off a small cliff and badly injures her head, only for everyone but Willem (including the girl) to act indifferently. Unnerved, Willem has a reluctant Nygglatho tell him who the girls actually are. Five centuries earlier, humanity created seventeen beasts which proceeded to exterminate humanity, leading their fantastical descendants to become the dominant species. Nygglatho explains that the girls are leprechauns, who have replicated human behavior and thus are the only creatures who are able to wield Dug Weapons, the only weapons able to kill the seventeen beasts; however, their bodies are subsequently built to be expendable and thus they have no fear of death. Ithea and Chtholly soon leave for several days to fight one of the beasts but return safely. Picking them up and encountering the lizard-man again, Willem tells Ithea that he intends to stay with the girls because they remind him of someone he knew in a similar situation. While tending to Chtholly, she warns Willem that in five days time, the beasts intend to launch a giant ball of energy which can be only be destroyed by a suicidal charge from the girls, with her being the one to do so this time. As a final request, she has him kiss her good night. Chtholly goes back to sleep, as Willem remembers that "someone", a red-haired girl named Lillia.
3	"Starry Road to Tomorrow"; Transliteration: "Kono Tatakai ga Owattara" (Japanese: この戦いが終わったら (lit. Until this war is over) -starry road to tomorrow-)	April 25, 2017
Willem and Nephren pull an all-nighter in archives looking for a way for Chtholly to avoid death. Upon discovering them in the morning, Chtholly rebukes them for trying to alter her fate, so Willem takes Chtholly outside for a sparring duel. With both wielding Dug Weapons, Willem handily defeats Chtholly, explaining that the leprechauns' unrefined fighting technique and their lack of knowledge about the Dug Weapons is what prevents them from greater success. This angers Chtholly, as it would mean their sacrifices were for naught, only for Willem to suddenly collapse from internal bleeding. Nygglatho manages to stabilize him. Later at night, she explains to the girls that she found Willem's petrified state frozen in ice years earlier, and managed to thaw and cure him. With Willem using a universal translator, they were able to discover that Willem is the world's last human, now known as "emnetwihts" and ridiculed by all other hypersentient species; despite this, all the girls react to him with curiosity except Chtholly, who in her distress flies away and meets with the lizard-man, revealed to be named Limeskin. He reassures her that Willem is simply trying to push against her nature, but advises her to act as she desires. Chtholly returns to the island, where she discovers Willem performing maintenance on her sword, and he explains that Dug Weapons are made from people's wishes. She decides to accept Willem's offer of properly teaching her; at her request, she also asks for Willem to make her buttercake should she return safely, unaware that Willem had been promised to have the exact same thing by the girl who saw him off before he left to fight the beasts. Chtholly, Ithea, and Nephren then leave to go fight the beasts.
4	"Dice in Pot"; Transliteration: "Kaeranu Mono to, Machi-tsuzuketa Mono-tachi" (Japanese: 帰らぬ者と、待ち続けた者たち (lit. Those who wait, and those who do not come back) -dice in pot-)	May 2, 2017
Over two weeks after Chtholly's group left, Willem continues to watch over the girls, but begins experiencing nightmares that the trio have all died on their mission. Eventually, one of the girls, Tiat, has a special dream of her talking to someone unfamiliar; this dream, called a Harbinger Dream, requires a checkup immediately afterwards. To do this, Willem and Tiat travel to Corna de Luce, an island where human-like creatures and beastmen live in harmony, for Tiat to get checked at a hospital. As the island was the filming location for several romance films, of which Tiat is a fan, Willem and her go on a minor sightseeing tour of various film locales. After concluding their tour at a famous statue of the city's founder, they witness beastmen attacking the shop of another beastman for an unspecified reason; Willem covertly intervenes, allowing the former to be arrested. While Tiat gets her checkup, Willem talks to the head doctor, who tells him that the Harbinger Dream is said to be an indicator that a Leprechaun has reached the age of maturity and can fight in combat. Tiat, like other girls, must receive the checkup to determine how to best prepare their body accordingly. Willem is privately distraught at Tiat being sent into battle at such a young age. Later, while spending the night at a military compound, Willem wakes up early and goes for a walk. He runs into a dog beastwoman, who reveals she is concealing a weapon and requests Willem deliver a message to Limeskin. Before he can confirm, they receive world from other officers that the battle has failed. Willem collapses in despair, only for Limeskin and all three girls to walk into the compound perfectly fine. Overwhelmed, Willem uses magic to run to Chtholly and hug her (much to everyone's surprise), only for her to slap him in return.
5	"From Dawn til Dusk"; Transliteration: "Dare mo Kare mo ga, Seigi no Na no Moto ni" (Japanese: 誰も彼もが、正義の名のもとに (lit. Everyone, in the name of justice) -from dawn till dusk-)	May 9, 2017
Eighteen hours earlier, Chtholly, Ithea, and Nephren fight against the beast, but when it takes on a new form Limeskin orders a strategic retreat, forcing the island in question to be abandoned. Chtholly attempts to disobey this and keep fighting, but she suddenly experiences a vision of a young girl speaking cryptic, haunting words that briefly turns her eyes red. In the present, while they update Willem on the events, Chtholly blames herself for not going through with the suicidal attack, but Nephren consoles her. They are interrupted by the dog beastwoman Willem encountered, revealed to be Limeskin's friend's daughter Phyra. She gives Limeskin evidence of death threats against her father, Corna de Luce's mayor, due to his support of racial integration, by a group of supremacists known as the Annihilation Knights. She asks for military support at an upcoming rally, but everyone in the room, though sympathetic, declines due to military policy forbidding them from interfering in local affairs, and also to avoid escalating the conflict. Despite their rejection, Phyra still accompanies Willem and the leprechauns as they retrieve Tiat, then proceeds to treat them to lunch and take them on the sightseeing tour Willem earlier promised Tiat. During the tour, Chtholly continues to have the visions she experienced during the battle, but decides not to tell the rest. Later, Willem notices the Annihilation Knights are following them with the intent of kidnapping Phyra. He and the girls lure them into an alley, where he proceeds to handily defeat them by using magic to lethally flip coins at him, then has them arrested. Though grateful for defeating them, Phyra chastises him for using her as bait, then departs. As evening approaches, Chtholly pulls Willem to the side and makes him admit that he wanted a fight out of an innate suicidal desire. Willem then further admits that, though longing for death with the absence of the people he left behind, he has found a potential new family in the girls, explaining his earlier reaction and hug; hearing this, Chtholly realizes she is in love with him. Just as they are about to leave, Willem is approached by an officer who tells him that someone named Souwong would like to meet with him. Recognizing that name, Willem sends the girls home without joining them.
6	"No News was Good News"; Transliteration: "Kienai Kako, Kieteiku Mirai" (Japanese: 消えない過去、消えていく未来 -no news was good news-)	May 16, 2017
Chtholly and the other fairies returned to the warehouse, while Willem went to meet his old friend, the Great Sage, Souwong. The two of them reminisces the past.
7	"Home, Sweet Home"; Transliteration: "Tadaima Kaerimashita" (Japanese: ただいま、帰りました (lit. I'm home, Welcome home) -home, sweet home-)	May 23, 2017
Two fairy soldiers, Nopht and Rhantolk, are on a mission to escort a group of salvagers to the surface. There, they met one of Willem's friend, Grick. Pondering about the Beasts that are related to their own reasons of being, Rhantolk begins questioning about them to Grick.
8	"Slight Light, Slight Hope"; Transliteration: "Izure Sono Yō wa Ochiru to Shite mo" (Japanese: いずれその陽は落ちるとしても (lit. Even if the sun is about to set) -slight light, slight hope-)	May 30, 2017
Willem was summoned to the military base on Island 49 regarding the situation with the salvagers on the surface. Much to Willem's displeasure, he was ordered to send one fairy soldier from the warehouse to the surface.
9	"Moonlit Sorcery"; Transliteration: "Tatoe Mirai ga Mienakute mo" (Japanese: たとえ未来が見えなくても (lit. Even if it's impossible to see the future) -moonlit sorcery-)	June 6, 2017
Chtholly wasn't sure if she can keep her individuality. Ithea came to her and revealed that Chtholly wasn't the only one that had problems with memories from previous life. Ithea begun telling a story about "a certain girl" whose individuality was eroded by her past life's memory.
10	"My Happiness"; Transliteration: "Ima Kono Toki no Kagayaki o" (Japanese: いまこの時の輝きを (lit. This present radience) -my happiness-)	June 13, 2017
Willem met with Rhantolk and Nopht, and immediately provided maintenance for the venenum poisoning in their body. Even so, Rhantolk still cannot trust the sole survivor of the Emnetwiht who was wiped out by the 17 Beasts.
11	"Evidence of Existence"; Transliteration: "Dō ka, Wasurenaide" (Japanese: どうか、忘れないで (lit. Do not forget me) -evidence of existence-)	June 20, 2017
Still being a bit awkward due to the proposal from the previous day, Willem and Chtolly met up with Grick to check up the ruins of Willem's birthplace, Gomag City. All of the sudden, a huge earthquake happened and a swarm of Timere appeared.
12	"CHTHOLLY"; Transliteration: "Sekai de Ichiban Shiawase na Onna no Ko" (Japanese: 世界で一番幸せな女の子 (lit. The happiest girl in the world) -CHTHOLLY-)	June 27, 2017
Nephren, Rhantolk, and Nopht fought back against the swarm of Timere, but their overwhelming numbers gradually pushed the fairies into a corner. Willem enters the fray and fought the Timere with his wounded body. In her last moment, Chtholly asked one last request to Elq.

== In popular culture ==
WorldEnd characters have been used in Codeforces contests multiple times, including rounds 449 and 1116.
