= Aikatsu Stars! =

Japanese arcade game

- Anime key visual

アイカツスターズ！ (Aikatsu Sutāzu!)
- Created by: BN Pictures (story); Bandai (concept)
- Anime television series
- Directed by: Teruo Satō
- Produced by: Takanori Itō; Hirokazu Hara; Nobuyuki Hosoya
- Written by: Yūko Kakihara
- Music by: onetrap
- Studio: BN Pictures
- Original network: TXN (TV Tokyo), BS Japan, AT-X
- Original run: April 7, 2016 – March 29, 2018
- Episodes: 100
- Video games
- Aikatsu Stars! (Data Carddass, 2016); Aikatsu Stars! First Appeal (Nintendo 3DS, 2016); Aikatsu Stars! My Special Appeal (Nintendo 3DS, 2016); Aikatsu Stars! Wings of Stars (Data Carddass, 2017); Aikatsu! Photo on Stage (App, 2018)
- Other series
- Aikatsu! (2012); Aikatsu Stars! (2016); Aikatsu Friends! (2018); Aikatsu on Parade! (2019); Aikatsu Planet! (2021); Aikatsu Academy! (2024)
- icon

Aikatsu Stars! (アイカツスターズ！, Aikatsu Sutāzu!) is an arcade collectible card game in Bandai's Data Carddass line of machines, which was launched in May 2016. It is the successor to the Aikatsu! series of arcade games. The game revolves around using collectible cards featuring various clothes to help aspiring idols pass auditions. An anime television adaptation by BN Pictures began airing on TV Tokyo from April 7, 2016, to March 29, 2018. It was succeeded by Aikatsu Friends! on April 5, 2018.

== Plot ==
The series features a girl named Yume Nijino who enrolls at Four Star Academy alongside some of her friends to become a top idol. The academy is known for a girl group called S4 consisting of the top four idols. Yume also receives attention from Subaru, a member of the boy group M4, who seems to have a crush on her due to his way of speaking and body language when she is around him.

The second season introduces Venus Ark, a rival school to Four Star Academy that uses a ship as its schoolhouse. Two of the students, "perfect idol" Elza Forte and Kirara Hanazono, join Yume and the other idols, while also explaining them about the highest class dress type known as "Star Premium Rare Coord".

== Characters ==
Yume Nijino (虹野ゆめ, Nijino Yume)
Voiced by: Miyu Tomita (speaking voice) Sena from Aikatsu Stars! (Singing Voice)
The main protagonist, Yume is a first-year middle school student who entered Four Star Academy with her best friend Koharu Nanakura with the goal of becoming part of the top idol unit, S4, a goal which came to fruition after attending the concert of S4's Hime Shiratori, of whom Yume is a big fan.
Laura Sakuraba (桜庭ローラ, Sakuraba Rōra)
Voiced by: Ayaka Asai (speaking voice) Rie from Aikatsu Stars! (singing voice)
Laura is Yume's classmate who comes from a long line of musicians, with her father being a violinist and her mother being a pianist. She is caring and has a strong sense of justice, but hates losing and can sometimes act before thinking. A Cool type idol, her theme color is blue, and she is a Flower Song Class student.
Koharu Nanakura (七倉小春, Nanakura Koharu)
Voiced by: Megumi Yamaguchi (speaking voice) Nanase from Aikatsu Stars! (singing voice)
Koharu is Yume's childhood friend and roommate. She is quiet, gentle, and demure, but is always willing to lend a hand to those who need anything.
Ako Saotome (早乙女あこ, Saotome Ako)
Voiced by: Natsumi Murakami (speaking voice) Miki from Aikatsu Stars! (singing voice)
Ako is a student from the Bird Drama Class who is confident in her abilities as an actress. She was initially calm and collected, but is actually easily flustered, temperamental, and has a tendency to act like a cat.
Hime Shiratori (白鳥ひめ, Shiratori Hime)
Voiced by: Minami Tsuda (speaking voice) Ruka from Aikatsu Stars! (singing voice)
Hime is one of the 25th S4 members in Season 1. Kind and elegant, she has been in the entertainment industry since childhood, earning herself experience in various fields such as modeling, dancing, and acting. However, her true talent lies in singing, in which she is described as having an angelic voice.
Tsubasa Kisaragi (如月ツバサ, Kisaragi Tsubasa)
Voiced by: Sumire Morohoshi (speaking voice) Nanase from Aikatsu Stars! (singing voice)
One of the 25th S4 members in Season 1, and the student council president. She is compassionate and reliable, making her popular among underclassmen.
Yuzu Nikaidō (二階堂ゆず, Nikaidō Yuzu)
Voiced by: Azusa Tadokoro (speaking voice) Kana from Aikatsu Stars! (singing voice)
One of the 25th S4 members in Season 1, Yuzu is described as a dancing genius. She is typically very active and gets bored easily, and runs away so much that her admins have to find a means to catch her and bring her back in time for a live.
Yozora Kasumi (香澄夜空, Kasumi Yozora)
Voiced by: Ayaka Ōhashi (speaking voice) Miho from Aikatsu Stars! (singing voice)
One of the 25th S4 members in Season 1, Yozora is a charismatic, big sister-type person who actively cares for her juniors.
Mahiru Kasumi (香澄真昼, Kasumi Mahiru)
Voiced by: Yume Miyamoto (speaking voice) Kana from Aikatsu Stars! (singing voice)
Yozora's younger sister, Mahiru has a mature aura that makes her difficult to approach, but is shown to quickly befriend Koharu after she gives Mahiru cough drops to help with her cough.
Lily Shirogane (白銀リリィ, Shirogane Ririi)
Voiced by: Reina Ueda (Speaking Voice) Nanase from Aikatsu Stars! (singing voice)
A senior admin of the Song Class, Lily is a strong, self-composed girl who is not easily influenced by other people. She forms a duo called Yuzu'n'Lily with her childhood friend, Yuzu.
Elza Forte (エルザ フォルテ, Eruza Forute)
Voiced by: Yōko Hikasa (speaking voice) Risa Aizawa (singing voice)
Elza is the founder of Venus Ark / Neo Venus Ark and heiress to a faraway country. She has been a perfectionist since childhood but seems distant from other idols.
Rei Kizaki (騎咲 レイ, Kizaki Rei)
Voiced by: Natsumi Fujiwara (speaking voice) Rie from Aikatsu Stars! (singing voice)
Rei is a student of Venus Ark / Neo Venus Ark and Elza's secretary.
It is known she has a calm disposition at all times and has perfect behavior like that of a butler and also has a firm character. She likes to collect cute things. She has a pet ragdoll cat named Miranda.
Kirara Hanazono (花園きらら, Hanazono Kirara)
Voiced by: Nako Eguchi (speaking voice) Miho from Aikatsu Stars! (singing voice)
Kirara is a student of Venus Ark / Neo Venus Ark who was born in New Zealand. She has a fluffy character and lives freely without restrictions. Kirara tends to surprise those around her with her unexpected behavior. Despite being often lonely and pampered, she developed great color and design sense from her mother, who works as a painter. Caroline is her pet pink sheep.
Aria Futaba (双葉アリア, Futaba Aria)
Voiced by: Kaori Maeda (speaking voice) Ruka from Aikatsu Stars! (singing voice)
Aria is a student of Venus Ark / Neo Venus Ark who was born in Finland.

== Media ==
=== Game ===
Data Carddass Aikatsu Stars is a Data Carddass game for Season 1. In season 2, a new Data Carddass game titled Data Carddass Aikatsu Stars Wings Of Stars was announced. Two 3DS games have been released. The first 3DS game, titled Aikatsu Stars First Appeal, was released on July 20, 2016. The second 3DS game, titled "Aikatsu Stars My Special Appeal", was released on November 24, 2016.

=== Anime ===
An anime television series produced by BN Pictures began airing on TV Tokyo from April 7, 2016, succeeding the original Aikatsu! in its initial timeslot.

=== Films ===
Aikatsu Stars! The Movie, was released on August 13, 2016.

Aikatsu Stars! ~Progress of the Stars~, was released on January 22, 2027.
