= Megumi Yamaguchi =

Japanese actress

- 山口 愛
- Born: May 12, 1997 (age 29); Tokyo, Japan
- Occupations: Actress; voice actress
- Years active: 2002–present
- Agent: Himawari Theatre Group
- Known for: New Game! as Hifumi Takimoto; Wise Man's Grandchild as Lynn Hughes; Aikatsu Stars! as Koharu Nanakura; Koisuru Asteroid as Ao Manaka
- Height: 153 cm (5 ft 0 in)

Megumi Yamaguchi (山口 愛, Yamaguchi Megumi; born May 12, 1997) is a Japanese actress and voice actress from Tokyo who is affiliated with the Himawari Theatre Group. She debuted as an actress in 2002, playing a role in the television series First Love, and later appeared in several television series and commercials. Her first voice acting role in an anime was as the character Lulu in the anime television series Michiko & Hatchin. She is known for her roles as Hifumi Takimoto in the anime television series New Game!, Lynn Hughes in Wise Man's Grandchild, and Koharu Nanakura in Aikatsu Stars!.

== Filmography ==
=== Anime ===
2008

- Michiko & Hatchin as Lulu

2009

- Tokyo Magnitude 8.0 as Hina Kusakabe
- Mainichi Kaasan as Yuki-chan

2010

- Cooking Idol Ai! Mai! Main! as Tomo

2016

- New Game! as Hifumi Takimoto, Sōjirō
- Aikatsu Stars! as Koharu Nanakura

2017

- Akashic Records of Bastard Magic Instructor as Lynn Titis
- New Game!! as Hifumi Takimoto, Sōjirō

2018

- Tada Never Falls in Love as Tourist (episode 1), Town girl (episode 1)

2019

- Wise Man's Grandchild as Lynn Hughes
- Z/X Code reunion as Muramasa

2020

- Asteroid in Love as Ao Manaka

2021

- Wonder Egg Priority as Frill

2022

- Cue! as Mahoro Miyaji

2023

- The Fire Hunter as Hinako

=== Dubbing ===
- Nanny McPhee (Christianna Brown (Holly Gibbs))
