= Natsumi Murakami =

Japanese voice actress

- 村上 奈津実
- Born: 7 September 1995 (age 31); Tokyo, Japan
- Occupation: Voice actress
- Years active: 2016–present
- Agent: Yūrin Pro
- Notable work: Aikatsu Stars! as Ako Saotome; Love Live! Nijigasaki High School Idol Club as Ai Miyashita; Mewkledreamy as Yume Hinata
- Height: 152 cm (5 ft 0 in)

Natsumi Murakami (村上 奈津実, Murakami Natsumi; born 7 September 1995) is a Japanese voice actress associated with Yūrin Pro. She is best known for voicing Ako Saotome in Aikatsu Stars!, Yume Hinata in Mewkledreamy and Ai Miyashita in Love Live! Nijigasaki High School Idol Club.

== Biography ==
Natsumi Murakami was born in Tokyo on 7 September 1995. Her motivation to become a voice actor came from a reading drama where a junior high school English class spoke to an Alice in Wonderland book; her classmates gave her the impression that Alice's voice was cute, and she became interested in the voice acting profession. The perspective of the anime that she liked originally changed, and she was impressed by Mamoru Miyano's performance in Death Note.

As a junior high school student, she could not work part-time and did not have the money to attend lessons, so she concentrated on schoolwork. After completing exams, Murakami started looking for a school she could study voice acting. Murakami attended hands-on classes at several vocational schools and training schools, and seeing good tension in it, decided to enroll in Keiko Yokozawa's school, where she started learning the basics of voice acting.

Her debut anime was in Aikatsu Stars!, where she voiced Ako Saotome. She mentions Ako Saotome as a turning point in her voice acting career, and says that she is important in her life. In addition to Saotome, she also cites Wobblinger-Milli, a character she voiced in the video game Quiz RPG: The World of Mystic Wiz, as leaving a lasting impression on her.

She voiced Ai Miyashita in Love Live! School Idol Festival All Stars and the 2020–2022 anime adaptation Love Live! Nijigasaki High School Idol Club.

== Personal life ==
She has level 2 Kanji Kentei certification. Her motto is Naru yō ni naru (なるようになる).

She described her goal as to play an orthodox heroine in a romantic comedy. She cites Ikue Ōtani and Rie Kugimiya as her admirations.

Her favorite foods are meat and white rice and Japanese curry. Her favorite anime is Cardcaptor Sakura, which she has been repeatedly watching since kindergarten, and her favorite musician is aiko. She has a pet dog named Moka (モカ).

After she started fishing, which is one of her hobbies, she began to like it because she caught a lot of fish.

On June 30, 2022, Murakami tested positive for COVID-19.

== Filmography ==
=== Anime ===
2016

- Aikatsu Stars! as Ako Saotome

2017

- Minami Kamakura High School Girls Cycling Club as Megumi Mizuno
- Urara Meirocho

2019

- Aikatsu on Parade! as Ako Saotome
- Fight League: Gear Gadget Generators as Autocleaner Machi

2020

- Mewkledreamy as Yume Hinata
- Love Live! Nijigasaki High School Idol Club as Ai Miyashita

2021

- Combatants Will Be Dispatched! as Rose

2022

- Slow Loop as Futaba Fukumoto
- Love Live! Nijigasaki High School Idol Club 2nd Season as Ai Miyashita
- The Little Lies We All Tell as Chiyo

2024

- Quality Assurance in Another World as Namiko

2025

- The Too-Perfect Saint: Tossed Aside by My Fiancé and Sold to Another Kingdom as Emily Matilas

2026

- Star Detective Precure! as Shiruku Ieiri
- Ichijyoma Mankitsu Gurashi! as Miori Morita

2027

- Booty Royale: Never Go Down Without a Fight! as Chae Yoon-Hee

=== Film ===
2016

- Aikatsu Stars! the Movie as Ako Saotome

=== Video games ===
2017

- Quiz RPG: The World of Mystic Wiz as Wobblinger-Milli

2019

- Love Live! School Idol Festival All Stars as Ai Miyashita

2020

- 100% Orange Juice as Ceoreparque (Witch Pack DLC)

2022

- Dreamin' Her -Boku wa, Kanojo no Yume o Miru.- as Kako, Mirai Nanase

2023

- Azur Lane as HMS Theseus
