= Azusa Tadokoro =

Japanese voice actress and singer (born 1993)

- 田所 あずさ
- Born: November 10, 1993 (age 32); Mito, Ibaraki, Japan
- Occupations: Voice actress; singer
- Years active: 2012–present
- Agent: Inspion Agency
- Height: 158 cm (5 ft 2 in)
- Musical career
- Genres: J-pop; anison
- Instrument: Vocals
- Years active: 2014–present
- Label: Lantis

Azusa Tadokoro (田所 あずさ, Tadokoro Azusa; born November 10, 1993) is a Japanese voice actress and singer. She is affiliated with the talent agency Inspion Agency and signed to record label Lantis. She participated in an audition sponsored by her former agency HoriPro Entertainment. Her notable roles include Aoi Kiriya in Aikatsu!, Shizuka Mogami in The Idolmaster Million Live!, Kaoru Seta in BanG Dream!, Phino Bloodstone in Yu-Shibu, Symboli Rudolf in Umamusume: Pretty Derby, Chtholly Nota Seniorious in WorldEnd and Moroha in Yashahime. She performed theme songs for anime, such as Myriad Colors Phantom World and Trickster.

== Biography ==
Tadokoro was born in Mito, Ibaraki. She became interested in acting after hearing Akiko Yajima voicing Kohaku in the anime series Inuyasha. She participated in the 36th Horipro Talent Scout Caravan and was declared the winner. She joined the talent agency Horipro and decided to debut as a singer with the record label Lantis. She made her voice acting debut in 2012, voicing a character in a commercial for SSK Foods. That same year she was cast as Muneo Meshiyori in So, I Can't Play H!. Later that year, she was cast as Aoi Kiriya in Aikatsu! becoming her first main role. Since then, she has appeared in many concerts, stage events and radio programs. The following year she was cast as Phino Bloodstone in I Couldn't Become a Hero, So I Reluctantly Decided to Get a Job, and Shizuka Mogami in the mobile game The Idolmaster Million Live!. In 2014, she was cast as Kotori Takatori in Brynhildr in the Darkness. She performed the series' ending theme song "Ichiban Boshi" (いちばん星) with Risa Taneda, Aya Suzaki, and M·A·O. Late that year, she made her official debut as a singer for Lantis by releasing her first album Beyond Myself; the album peaked at number 33 on the Oricon weekly charts.

She launched her official Facebook and Twitter account on May 31, 2015. In April 2015, she released her first single "Dream Line"; the song peaked at number 40 on the Oricon weekly charts. That same year, she was cast as Kiriko Shikishima in Ultimate Otaku Teacher. The following year, she voiced the character Ruru in Myriad Colors Phantom World; she performed the series' ending theme song "Junshin Always" (純真Always). Later that year, she played the character Nao Nakamura in the anime Trickster; she performed the series' first opening theme song "1 Hope Sniper", and the second ending theme song "Unmei Dilemma" (運命ジレンマ).

In 2017, she voiced Tae Futaba in Masamune-kun's Revenge. She then played the role of Chtholly Nota Seniorious in the anime WorldEnd which she also performed the opening theme song "Dearest Drop". The following year, she was cast as Symboli Rudolf in Cygames's multimedia franchise Umamusume: Pretty Derby, and Chloe in That Time I Got Reincarnated as a Slime; she performed the series' second ending theme song "Little Soldier" (リトルソルジャー). Tadokoro released the song "Rivals" as the ending theme for the anime series Kandagawa Jet Girls.

== Filmography ==
=== Anime series ===
List of voice performances in anime
Year	Title	Role	Notes	Source
2012–2013	So, I Can't Play H!	Muneo Meshiyori	Also OVA	
2012	Nakaimo - My Sister is Among Them!	Schoolgirl	Ep. 2	
2012–2016	Aikatsu!	Aoi Kiriya	Speaking voice	
2013	Karneval	Nurse		
2013–2014	I Couldn't Become a Hero, So I Reluctantly Decided to Get a Job	Phino Bloodstone	Also OVA	
2014	Agriculture Angel Baraki	Suke-bi	ONA	
2014	Daimidaler the Sound Robot	Sewashiko Goya		
2014	Brynhildr in the Darkness	Kotori Takatori		
2014	Himegoto	Hiro Toyotomi		
2014	Tokyo ESP	Murasaki Edoyama		
2015	Death Parade	Female guest	Ep. 12	
2015	Ultimate Otaku Teacher	Kiriko Shikishima		
2015–2016	Sound! Euphonium	Azusa Sasaki	Also season 2	
2016	Myriad Colors Phantom World	Ruru		
2016	Divine Gate	Bedivere		
2016	Bakuon!!	Yume Sakura		
2016–2018	Aikatsu Stars!	Yuzu Nikaido, Aoi Kiriya	Speaking voice	
2016	Big Order	Iyo	Also OAV in 2015	
2016	Trickster	Nao Nakamura		
2016	Luger Code 1951	Yonaga	ONA	
2017–present	Masamune-kun's Revenge	Tae Futaba	Also season 2	
2017	WorldEnd	Chtholly Nota Seniorious		
2017	Seven Mortal Sins	Astaroth		
2018	Märchen Mädchen	Sachi Hino		
2018	Violet Evergarden	Luculia Marlborough	Ep. 3, 6	
2018	Pop Team Epic	Pipimi	Ep. 8a	
2018–2023	Umamusume: Pretty Derby	Symboli Rudolf		
2018–2019	Aikatsu Friends!	Karen Kamishiro		
2018	BanG Dream! Girls Band Party! Pico	Kaoru Seta	ONA	
2019–2020	BanG Dream!	Kaoru Seta	Seasons 2 and 3	
2019	The Ones Within	Kikka		
2019	Real Girl	Reiko Akiyama	Ep. 13-14	
2019	That Time I Got Reincarnated as a Slime	Chloe		
2019–2020	Aikatsu on Parade!	Aoi Kiriya, Yuzu Nikaido, Karen Kamishiro		
2019	Kandagawa Jet Girls	Kaguya Shijyuin		
2019	Chidori RSC	Marina Tsuji		
2020	BanG Dream! Girls Band Party! Pico: Ohmori	Kaoru Seta	ONA	
2020–2022	Yashahime	Moroha		
2020–2023	By the Grace of the Gods	Ryoma Takebayashi (child)	Also season 2	
2020	Boruto: Naruto Next Generations	Tento Madoka		
2021	Wonder Egg Priority	Koito Nagase		
2021	Aikatsu Planet!	Smart Kyubi		
2021	SSSS.Dynazenon	Mei		
2021	Muteking the Dancing Hero	Naomi		
2021	BanG Dream! Girls Band Party! Pico Fever!	Kaoru Seta		
2022	In the Land of Leadale	Caerina		
2022	Akebi's Sailor Uniform	Riona Shijou		
2022	Lucifer and the Biscuit Hammer	Hisame Asahina		
2022	Arknights: Prelude to Dawn	Texas		
2023	Handyman Saitou in Another World	Ninia		
2023	Malevolent Spirits: Mononogatari	Itsuki		
2023	Rail Romanesque 2	Kiriko		
2023	The Idolmaster Million Live!	Shizuka Mogami		
2024	Yu-Gi-Oh! Go Rush!!	Zeyet	Season 3	
2024	Narenare: Cheer for You!	Noichigo Izawa		
2024	VTuber Legend: How I Went Viral After Forgetting to Turn Off My Stream	Arisu Sōma		
2025	Anyway, I'm Falling in Love with You	Chika Kurashiki		
2025	Umamusume: Cinderella Gray	Symboli Rudolf		
2025	City the Animation	Eri Amakazari		
2025	My Friend's Little Sister Has It In for Me!	Reiku Otoi		
2025	2200-Nen Neko no Kuni Nippon	Sora		
2026	Kaya-chan Isn't Scary	Akira-sensei		
2026	Nia Liston: The Merciless Maiden	Riculvitar Silver		
2026	The World's Strongest Witch	Zariche		

=== Anime films ===
List of voice performances in feature films
Year	Title	Role	Notes	Source
2013	The Garden of Words	Schoolgirl		
2014	Persona 3 The Movie: No. 2, Midsummer Knight's Dream	Schoolgirl B		
2014	Aikatsu! The Movie	Aoi Kiriya	Speaking voice	
2016	Aikatsu Stars! The Movie	Yuzu Nikaido	Speaking voice	
2016	Pop in Q	Miharu Fukamachi		
2018	Mazinger Z: Infinity	MazinGirl Orange		
2019	Violet Evergarden: Eternity and the Auto Memory Doll	Luculia Marlborough		
2019	BanG Dream! Film Live	Kaoru Seta		
2021	BanG Dream! Film Live 2nd Stage	Kaoru Seta		

=== Video games ===
List of voice performances in video games
Year	Title	Role	Notes	Source
2012	Aikatsu! Cinderella Lesson	Aoi Kiriya	3DS	
2013	The Idolmaster Million Live!	Shizuka Mogami	iOS, Android	
2013	Age of Amazones	Kunoichi	3DS	
2013	Aikatsu! Futari no My Princess	Aoi Kiriya	3DS	
2014	The Idolmaster One For All	Shizuka Mogami	PS3	
2015	Princess Connect!	Mifuyu Ogami	iOS, Android	
2015	Drift Girls	Claudia	iOS, Android	
2015	Valkyrie Drive: Siren	Urara Sashō	iOS, Android	
2016	Granblue Fantasy	Phoebe	iOS, Android	
2016	Akiba's Beat	Saki Hoshino	PS4, PS Vita	
2017	BanG Dream! Girls Band Party!	Kaoru Seta	iOS, Android	
2017	The Idolmaster: Million Live! Theater Days	Shizuka Mogami	iOS, Android	
2017	Magia Record: Puella Magi Madoka Magica Side Story	Kaoru Maki	iOS, Android	
2018	Princess Connect! Re:Dive	Mifuyu Ogami	iOS, Android	
2018	Shadowverse	Galmieux, Omen of Disdain	iOS, Android, PC	
2019	Arknights	Kroos, Texas	iOS, Android	
2019	Girls' Frontline	Jericho 941, P22	iOS, Android	
2020	Kandagawa Jet Girls	Kaguya Shijyuin	PS4, PC	
2021	Blue Archive	Haruna Kurodate	iOS, Android	
2021	Umamusume: Pretty Derby	Symboli Rudolf	iOS, Android	
2021	SINce Memories: Hoshi no Sora no Shita de	Azusa Satomi	Switch, PS4, PC	
2021	The Idolmaster: Starlit Season	Shizuka Mogami	PS4, PC	
2021-	Phantasy Star Online 2: New Genesis	Nadereh	PC, PS4, Switch, Xbox One, Xbox Series X/S	
2021	Counter:Side	Administration Sword Fighter, Regina MacCready	iOS, Android, PC	
2026	Neverness to Everness	Shinku	PC, PS5, iOS, Android	
2026	100% Orange Juice	Suishou	PC	

=== Dubbing ===
- All of Us Are Dead, Park Mi-jin (Lee Eun-saem)
- Detention, Fang Ray-shin (Gingle Wang)
- The Gilded Age, Gladys Russell (Taissa Farmiga)
- Old, Kara (Eliza Scanlen)
- Palm Springs, Tala Anne Wilder (Camila Mendes)
- RRR, Young Alluri Sitarama Raju (Varun Buddhadev)
- Silent Night, Alex (Kirby Howell-Baptiste)
- Vanguard, Fareeda (Xu Ruohan)

=== Others ===
- There's No Way I Can Have A Lover! (*Or Maybe There Is?!), Mai Oozuka (promotional video)
- Hoshimachi Suisei Tadokoro Azusa Heikousen Scramble weekly podcast with Hololive talent Hoshimachi Suisei

== Discography ==
=== Albums ===
List of albums, with selected chart positions
Title	Album details	Catalogue No.		Oricon	
Title	Album details	Regular edition	Limited edition	Peak position	Weeks charted
Beyond Myself!	Released: July 7, 2014; Label: Lantis; Format: CD, digital download	LACA-15424	—N/a	33	2
It's my CUE.	Released: July 6, 2016; Label: Lantis; Format: CD, CD + Blu-ray, digital download	LACA-15562	LACA-35562	27	3
So What?	Released: October 25, 2017; Label: Lantis; Format: CD, CD + Blu-ray, digital download	LACA-15659	LACA-35659	20	3
Waver	Released: January 27, 2021; Label: Lantis; Format: CD	LACA-15837	—N/a	61	2

=== Singles ===
List of singles, with selected chart positions
Release date	Title	Catalogue no. (Regular edition)	Oricon		Album	Notes
Release date	Title	Catalogue no. (Regular edition)	Peak position	Weeks charted	Album	Notes
April 22, 2015	"DREAM LINE"	LACM-14336	40	3	It's my CUE.	—N/a
September 2, 2015	"Kimi to no Yakusoku o Kazoeyo" (君との約束を数えよう)	LACM-14383	45	2	It's my CUE.	—N/a
February 10, 2016	"Junshin Always" (純真Always)	LACM-14441	22	3	It's my CUE.	Ending theme song for Myriad Colors Phantom World
October 26, 2016	"1HOPE SNIPER"	LACM-14536	52	1	So What?	1st ending theme song for Trickster
January 25, 2017	"Unmei Dilemma" (運命ジレンマ)	LACM-14567	31	2	So What?	2nd opening theme song for Trickster
April 26, 2017	"DEAREST DROP"	LACM-14588	32	11	So What?	Opening theme song for WorldEnd
July 7, 2018	"RESOLVE"	LACM-14776	53	2	TBA	1st ending theme song for Baki
January 23, 2019	"Little Soldier" (リトルソルジャー)	LACM-14821	27	3	TBA	2nd ending theme song for That Time I Got Reincarnated as a Slime
August 21, 2019	"Equal" (イコール)	LACM-14920	39	1	TBA	—N/a
November 27, 2019	"RIVALS"	LACM-14943	44	1	TBA	Ending theme song for Kandagawa Jet Girls
November 11, 2020	"Yasashi Sekai" (ヤサシイセカイ)	LACM-24048	29	3	TBA	Opening theme song for By the Grace of the Gods
