= Natsumi Fujiwara =

Japanese voice actress (born 1993)

- 藤原 夏海
- Born: June 2, 1993 (age 33); Shizuoka Prefecture, Japan
- Education: Japan Narration Performance Institute
- Occupation: Voice actress
- Years active: 2015–present
- Agent: Arts Vision

Natsumi Fujiwara (藤原 夏海, Fujiwara Natsumi; born June 2, 1993) is a Japanese voice actress represented by Arts Vision. She graduated from the Japan Narration Performance Institute. She voiced Chihiro Komiya in Shōnen Maid, Tōru Mutsuki in Tokyo Ghoul:re, Rei Kizaki in Aikatsu Stars!, Daigo Shigeno in Major 2nd, and Abigail Jones in Great Pretender. Additionally, she has also lent her voice to the younger version of Megumi Fushiguro from Jujutsu Kaisen.

== Filmography ==
=== Television animation ===
Year	Title	Role
2016	Beyblade Burst	Ukyou Ibuki
2016	Shōnen Maid	Chihiro Komiya
2016	Keijo	Atsuko Yoshida
2016	Super Lovers	Haru Kaido (young)
2016	Qualidea Code	Ginko Sajihara
2017–2018	Tomica Hyper Rescue Drive Head Kidō Kyūkyū Keisatsu	Gō Kurumada
2017	Minami Kamakura High School Girls Cycling Club	Natsumi Higa
2017	Alice & Zouroku	Asahi Hinagiri
2017	Knight's & Magic	Batson Termonen
2017–2018	Aikatsu Stars!	Rei Kizaki
2017	Magical Circle	Zaza
2017	Senki Zesshō Symphogear AXZ	Sonia Virena
2018	Tokyo Ghoul:re	Tōru Mutsuki
2018–2020	Major 2nd	Daigo Shigeno
2018	Beyblade Burst Super Z	Tobisuke
2018	Angels of Death	Edward Mason
2018	JoJo's Bizarre Adventure: Golden Wind	Giorno Giovanna (young)
2018–2019	Fairy Tail	Dimaria Yesta
2019–present	The Rising of the Shield Hero	Keel
2019–2020	Star Twinkle Pretty Cure	Ryoutarou Sorami (young)
2019–2021	True Cooking Master Boy	Liu Mao Xing
2019	Do You Love Your Mom and Her Two-Hit Multi-Target Attacks?	Amante
2019	Rifle Is Beautiful	Akira Shinome
2020	Beyblade Burst Superking	Hyuga Asahi
2020	Great Pretender	Abigail Jones
2020	Akudama Drive	Courier (young)
2021	Kemono Jihen	Kabane Kusaka
2021	Suppose a Kid from the Last Dungeon Boonies Moved to a Starter Town	Mikona
2021	The Case Study of Vanitas	Vanitas of the Blue Moon (fairy tale)
2021–2022	86	Theoto Rikka
2021	Night Head 2041	Takuya Kuroki (young)
2021	The Vampire Dies in No Time	Shin'ichi Katō
2021–2022	Amaim Warrior at the Borderline	I-LeS Gai
2022	Sabikui Bisco	Nuts
2022	Aharen-san Is Indecipherable	Atsushi
2022	Spy × Family	Damian Desmond
2022	Cap Kakumei Bottleman DX	Ayata Ebarada
2023	Fuuto PI	Brachiosaurus Dopant
2023	Too Cute Crisis	Yozora
2023	Insomniacs After School	Kanami Anamizu
2023	Sacrificial Princess and the King of Beasts	Lops (Clops)
2023	Jujutsu Kaisen	young Megumi Fushiguro
2023	Sweet Reincarnation	Marcarlo Doroba
2023	Soaring Sky! Pretty Cure	Red Harewataru
2023	The Duke of Death and His Maid 2nd Season	Niko
2023	A Returner's Magic Should Be Special	Pram Schneider
2024	Mr. Villain's Day Off	Oak Tree Boy
2024	As a Reincarnated Aristocrat, I'll Use My Appraisal Skill to Rise in the World	Ars Louvent
2024	Shinkalion: Change the World	Ten Uotora
2024	Blue Lock vs. U-20 Japan	Oliver Aiku (young)
2025	The Beginning After the End	Arthur
2025	Rock Is a Lady's Modesty	Tamaki Shiraya
2025	Pokémon Horizons: The Series	Ult
2025	Sakamoto Days	Apart (young)
2025	Witch Watch	Morihito Otogi (young)
2025	The Apothecary Diaries	Kyō-u
2025	Hell Teacher: Jigoku Sensei Nube	Akira Yamaguchi
2026	Rooster Fighter	Hikari
2026	Scenes from Awajima	Emi Okabe
2026	Daemons of the Shadow Realm	Ken Tadera

=== OVA/Film ===
Year	Title	Role	Notes
2020	Date A Live Fragment: Date A Bullet	Isami Hijikata	
2020	Yuuna and the Haunted Hot Springs	Mikogami Matora	2 OVAs: "Noroware no Kogarashi" and "Giri Giri!? Onsen Happening"
2022	The Orbital Children	Tōya Sagami	
2022	Break of Dawn	Shingo Kishi	
2023	Hokkyoku Hyakkaten no Concierge-san	Iwase	

=== Video games ===
2017

- Fire Emblem Heroes as Clarisse and Raigh
- Exile Election as Yuri Himeno

2018

- Dragalia Lost as Child Ranzal

2019

- AI: The Somnium Files as Ota Matsushita

2021

- World's End Club as Kansai
- Azur Lane as USS New Orleans

2022

- Shadowverse as Itsurugi
- Made in Abyss: Binary Star Falling into Darkness as Raul

2023

- 404 Game Re:set as Hang-On
- Final Fantasy XVI as Joshua Rosfield
- Umamusume: Pretty Derby as Katsuragi Ace
- TEVI as Sable

2025

- Zenless Zone Zero as Pulchra Fellini
- Trails in the Sky 1st Chapter as Joshua Bright
- The Hundred Line: Last Defense Academy as Takumi Sumino (young)

2026

- Arknights: Endfield as Arclight

=== Narration ===
2022-

- Tell me! 日医君（as 日医君）

=== Dubbing ===
==== Live-action ====
- Annika, Morgan (Silvie Furneaux)
- The Conjuring: Last Rites, Judy Warren (Mia Tomlinson)
- The Hunger Games: The Ballad of Songbirds & Snakes, Lucy Gray Baird (Rachel Zegler)
- Malignant, CST Winnie (Ingrid Bisu)
- Peter Rabbit 2: The Runaway, Liam (Owen Beamond)
- West Side Story, Maria (Rachel Zegler)

==== Animation ====
- Elliott from Earth, Elliott
