= Yuuki Shin =

Japanese voice actor and singer (born 1994)

- 新 祐樹
- Born: 6 March 1994 (age 32)
- Occupations: Voice actor; singer
- Years active: 2014–present
- Employer: Ken Production
- Notable work: Tokyo Revengers as Takemichi Hanagaki; Heavenly Delusion as Taka; KamiErabi God.app as Tatsuya; My Tiny Senpai as Takuma Shinozaki

Yuuki Shin (Japanese: 新 祐樹, Hepburn: Shin Yūki; born 6 March 1994) is a Japanese voice actor and singer from Yokohama, affiliated with Ken Production. He is known for starring as Takemichi Hanagaki in Tokyo Revengers, Taka in Heavenly Delusion, Tatsuya in KamiErabi God.app, and Takuma Shinozaki in My Tiny Senpai.

== Biography ==
Yuuki Shin, a native of Yokohama, was born on 6 March 1994. He became interested in voice acting after he started watching evening anime and late-night anime during junior high school, and he was part of a drama club during high school (as well as a broadcasting club he founded), during which he discovered a love for acting and began to seriously consider such a career. He was educated at ESP Animation and Voice Actor College.

He made his voice acting debut in 2014, and in April 2016, he became affiliated with Ken Production. During the early stage of his career, he voiced characters in anime and video games such as Haikyu!!, Attack on Titan, Cheating Craft, Grimms Notes, Kabaneri of the Iron Fortress, and Rin-ne. He voiced Akiomi Inamasu as part of the Dream Festival!, including in the video game Dream Festival! R, and he was part of the tie-in singing trio Answer who sang the track "Chivalric Romance" in the anime's original soundtrack.

In December 2020, it was announced that he would star in Takemichi Hanagaki in Tokyo Revengers; that was his first lead role in an anime television series. Toriko Toma said of Shin's performance of Takemichi: "his voice, which sounds like a cross between a child and an adult, is perfect for Takemichi", and that "Shin has the expressiveness to adapt to any development, from serious to comical, which makes him convincing in playing Takemichi." Around that time, he also voiced Jinn in Edens Zero. In 2023, he starred as Taka in Heavenly Delusion, Tatsuya in KamiErabi God.app, and Takuma Shinozaki in My Tiny Senpai.

== Filmography ==
=== Animated television ===
Year	Title	Role(s)	Ref
2014	Haikyu!!	Takahiro Hanamaki	
2016	Cheating Craft	C-type student	
2016	Heybot!	Moel	
2016	Kabaneri of the Iron Fortress	Messenger	
2016	Rin-ne	Male, teacher	
2017	Case Closed	Clerk	
2017	Digimon Universe: App Monsters	Tripmon	
2017	Dream Festival! R	Akiomi Inamasu	
2017	Kirakira Pretty Cure a la Mode	High school student	
2017	Made in Abyss	Jerme	
2017	Puzzle & Dragons X	Young boy	
2017	Sengoku Night Blood	Vassal	
2017	Wake Up, Girls!	Male A	
2018	Aikatsu Friends!		
2018	Banana Fish		
2018	Cells at Work!		
2018	Devilman Crybaby	Sabbat Man, Athletics Club member C	
2018	Dragon Pilot: Hisone and Masotan		
2018	Inazuma Eleven: Ares	Kazuya Haoto	
2018	Inazuma Eleven: Orion no Kokuin	Bergamo Regult	
2018	Iroduku: The World in Colors		
2018	My Hero Academia	Natsuo Todoroki	
2018	Pokémon the Series: Sun & Moon		
2018	Sazae-san		
2018	The Thousand Musketeers	Johan	
2018	Touken Ranbu: Hanamaru	Konnosuke	
2018	Yo-kai Watch Shadowside	Wakame-kun	
2019	Boogiepop Phantom	Kyō	
2019	Pokémon	Hōji	
2019	Senryu Girl		
2020	Duel Masters King	Parligilis, Arcadias	
2020	Haikyū!! To the Top	Tomokazu Wajima	
2020	Moriarty the Patriot	Tate Percival	
2020	given	Yuki Yoshida	
2021	Attack on Titan	Subordinate, Jaeger faction member	
2021	Edens Zero	Jinn	
2021	Log Horizon	Run, adventurer	
2021	Megalobox 2: Nomad	Shiga-chan	
2021	Rumble Garanndoll	Fan	
2021	Tokyo Revengers	Takemichi Hanagaki	
2021	Tsukimichi: Moonlit Fantasy	Hazal	
2022	Blue Lock	Hibiki Ōkawa	
2022	Call of the Night	Male student	
2022	Spy × Family	Carol Campbell	
2023	A Returner's Magic Should Be Special	Trevally Tarkus	
2023	Heavenly Delusion	Taka	
2023	KamiErabi God.app	Tatsuya	
2023	In/Spectre	Ghost	
2023	My Tiny Senpai	Takuma Shinozaki	
2023	The Rising of the Shield Hero	Yuji	
2024	Kaiju No. 8	Iharu Furuhashi	
2024	Sengoku Youko	Log Darkness	
2024	Solo Leveling	Inmate	
2024	Trillion Game	Ogura	
2025	Mobile Suit Gundam GQuuuuuuX	Char Aznable	
2025	Wind Breaker Season 2	Ritsu Otowa	
2025	My Hero Academia: Vigilantes	Mad Hatter Leader	
2025	Gachiakuta	Jabber Wonger	
2025	Sanda	Hitoshi Amaya	
2026	The Case Book of Arne	Nachzehrer	
2026	Thunder 3	Sameyama	

=== Live-action series ===
Year	Title	Role(s)	Ref
2021	Kikai Sentai Zenkaiger	Milk World	

=== Animated films ===
Year	Title	Role(s)	Ref
2015	Attack on Titan Part 2: Wings of Freedom	Trainees, etc.	
2015	Go! Princess Pretty Cure the Movie: Go! Go!! Gorgeous Triple Feature!!!	Fairy, resident, other	
2021	Evangelion: 3.0+1.0 Thrice Upon a Time		
2024	Mobile Suit Gundam: Silver Phantom	Male Protagonist	
2027	Ghost	Structure	

=== Original net animation ===
Year	Title	Role(s)	Ref
2016	Beyblade Burst QuadDrive	Young boy	
2017	The Dragon Dentist		
2019	Beyblade Burst Rise	Spark Devils Member	
2020	Pokémon: Twilight Wings	Employee A	
2020	Saikyō Kamizmode	Gōtetsu	
2022	Tiger & Bunny 2	Henry Lime	
2022	Tomica Heroes Jobraver	Fire Braver	

=== Video games ===
Year	Title	Role(s)	Ref
2016	Attack on Titan		
2016	Grimms Notes	Jack (Hero)	
2017	Dream Festival!	Akiomi Inamasu	
2017	White Cat Project	Soldiers, etc.	
2019	Ring Fit Adventure	Ring	
2023	Valorant	Gekko	
2025	The Hundred Line: Last Defense Academy	Murvrum	

=== Dubbing ===
==== Live-action ====
- The Penguin (Victor "Vic" Aguilar (Rhenzy Feliz))
- Saturday Night (Lorne Michaels (Gabriel LaBelle))

==== Animation ====
- My Adventures with Superman (Jimmy Olsen)
