= Akane Matsunaga =

Japanese voice actress

- 松永 あかね
- Born: October 14, 2001 (age 24); Mie Prefecture, Japan
- Occupation: Voice actress
- Years active: 2018–present
- Agent: Horipro
- Height: 160 cm (5 ft 3 in)

Akane Matsunaga (松永 あかね, Matsunaga Akane; born October 14, 2001) is a Japanese voice actress from Mie Prefecture, Japan, affiliated with Horipro.

== Career ==
Since her childhood, she played with her father watching anime and mimicking acting. She learned from her parents that there is a job as a voice actor, and when she was in elementary school, she vaguely aimed to be a voice actress. Then, she applied for the Jisedai Miracle Seiyū Audition (次世代声優ミラクルオーディション, Next Generation Voice Actor Miracle Audition) in 2017, won the Grand Prix award, and made her voice acting debut as Aine Yūki, the main character in the TV animation Aikatsu Friends!. Matsunaga went to Tokyo for her debut and worked on voice performance for the first time on the post-recording scene. As a member of the derivative unit BEST FRIENDS! in the popular vote for female voice actor starring in the 2018 spring broadcast anime performed at Kakaku.com's news site "Akiba Research Institute", the debut work Aikatsu Friends! and was ranked 46th out of 56.

== Filmography ==
=== Anime ===
Year	Title	Role
2018–2019	Aikatsu Friends!	Aine Yūki
2019–2020	Aikatsu on Parade!	Aine Yūki
2020	Mitchiri Wanko! Anima~tion	Leo
2021	Aikatsu Planet!	Bloody Rock
2021	Love Live Superstar!!	Aria Shibuya
2024	Goodbye, Dragon Life	Airi
2025	Shabake	Yanari

=== Video games ===
Year	Title	Role
2021	Blue Archive	Eimi Izumimoto
2023	The Idolmaster Cinderella Girls: Starlight Stage	Eve Santaclaus

=== Dubbing ===
Year	Title	Role
2021	Calamity, a Childhood of Martha Jane Cannary	Lena

== Bibliography ==
- "Omae wa dare da? vol.16" お前は誰だ？ vol. 16 [Who are you? vol.16]. Animedia (May 2018). Gakken Plus: 134–135. April 10, 2018.
