= Kelai =

Kelai may refer to:

- Kelai River, river in Borneo, Indonesia
- John Kelai (born 1976), Kenyan long-distance runner
- Collei (Chinese: 柯莱; pinyin: Kēlái), a character in the video game Genshin Impact

== See also ==
- Kalayeh, Rudbar, Iranian village, also known as Kelā’ī
- Punan Kelai language, also known as Segai, Austronesian language, spoken in several communities along the Kelai River
