= 15th Seiyu Awards =

Japanese voice acting awards ceremony in 2021

- Awarded for: Voice acting in Japan
- Date: March 6, 2021
- Location: JOQR Media Plus Hall; Minato, Tokyo
- Country: Japan

Highlights
- Best Lead Actor: Kenjiro Tsuda
- Best Lead Actress: Yui Ishikawa
- Website: www.seiyuawards.jp

The 15th Seiyu Awards was held on March 6, 2021, at the JOQR Media Plus Hall in Minato, Tokyo. The winners of the Merit Awards, the Kei Tomiyama Award, the Kazue Takahashi Award, and the Synergy Award were announced on February 16, 2021. The rest of the winners were announced on the ceremony day.

| Winners | Agency | Highlight Works |
|---|---|---|
Best Actor in a Leading Role
| Kenjiro Tsuda | Amuleto | Akihito Narihisago (Id: Invaded) |
Best Actress in a Leading Role
| Yui Ishikawa | mitt management | Violet Evergarden (Violet Evergarden: The Movie) |
Best Actors in Supporting Roles
| Takehito Koyasu | T's Factory | Roswaal L. Mathers (Re:Zero − Starting Life in Another World) |
| Nobunaga Shimazaki | Aoni Production | Yuki Sōma (Fruits Basket 2nd Season) |
Best Actresses in Supporting Roles
| Reina Ueda | 81 Produce | Shuka Karino (Darwin's Game) |
| Akari Kitō | Pro-Fit | Nene Yashiro (Toilet-Bound Hanako-kun) |
Best New Actors
| Masahiro Itō | Hibiki | Ren Nanahoshi (Argonavis from BanG Dream!) |
| Chiaki Kobayashi | Office Osawa | Makoto Edamura (Great Pretender) |
| Shimba Tsuchiya | Himawari Theatre Group | Sagami (My Teen Romantic Comedy SNAFU Climax) |
Best New Actresses
| Rin Aira | Horipro International | Wakaba Harukaze, Raki Kiseki (Aikatsu on Parade!) |
| Kana Ichinose | Sigma Seven e | Yuzuriha Ogawa (Dr. Stone) |
| Riho Sugiyama | Mausu Promotion | Minare Koda (Wave, Listen to Me!) |
| Natsumi Fujiwara | Arts Vision | Abigail Jones (Great Pretender) |
| Azumi Waki | Haikyō | Adele von Ascham/Mile (Didn't I Say to Make My Abilities Average in the Next Life?!) |
Singing Award
| Winner | Members | Agency |
| Walküre | JUNNA; Kiyono Yasuno; Nozomi Nishida; Nao Tōyama; Minori Suzuki | |
Personality Award
| Winner | Agency | Highlight Works |
| Hiroki Yasumoto | Sigma Seven | |

Merit Award
| Winners | Agency |
| Eiko Masuyama | Aoni Production |
| Masane Tsukayama | Seinenza Theater Company |
Kei Tomiyama Memorial Award
| Winner | Agency |
| Toshihiko Seki | 81 Produce |
Kazue Takahashi Memorial Award
| Winner | Agency |
| Yoshiko Sakakibara | Freelance |
Synergy Award
Winner
Voicarion IX: Teikoku Koe Kabuki ~Nobunaga no Inu~ stage reading
Special Honor Award
Winner
Demon Slayer: Kimetsu no Yaiba
Kids/Family Award
| Winner | Agency |
| Rie Nakagawa | Peerless Gerbera |
Foreign Movie/Series Award
| Winner | Agency |
| Kazuhiro Yamaji | Seinenza Theater Company |
| Kazue Komiya | Theater Echo |
Influencer Award
| Winner | Agency |
| Kotori Koiwai | Peerless Gerbera |
Most Valuable Seiyū Award
| Winner | Agency |
| Hiro Shimono | I'm Enterprise |
