= Aikatsu! =

Japanese arcade collectible card game and its franchise

- Key visual for the first season of the anime

アイカツ!
- Genre: Music, idol
- Created by: Sunrise (story, #1–152); BN Pictures (story, #153–178); Bandai (concept)
- Video game

Data Carddass Aikatsu!
- Developer: h.a.n.d.
- Publisher: Bandai
- Genre: Collectible card game
- Platform: Arcade
- Released: October 2012
- Anime television series
- Directed by: Ryūichi Kimura
- Produced by: Yōsuke Imai; Hatsuo Nara (S1); Ryuta Wakanabe (S1–2); Nobuyuki Hosoya (S2–4); Takanori Itō (S2–4)
- Written by: Yōichi Katō
- Music by: monaca
- Studio: Sunrise (#1–152); BN Pictures (#153–178)
- Original network: TXN (TV Tokyo), BS Japan, AT-X
- Original run: October 8, 2012 – March 31, 2016
- Episodes: 178
- Manga
- Written by: Banbi Shirayuki
- Published by: Shogakukan
- Magazine: Ciao
- Original run: December 2012 – present
- Volumes: 2
- Manga
- Written by: Shiori Kanaki
- Illustrated by: Akane
- Published by: Shogakukan
- Magazine: Pucchigumi
- Original run: January 2013 – present
- Light novel
- Written by: Sunrise, Bandai, Yōichi Katō
- Illustrated by: Kyō Nagiri
- Published by: Shogakukan
- Imprint: Ciao Novels
- Published: August 8, 2013
- Anime film

Aikatsu! The Movie
- Directed by: Ryūichi Kimura (Note: Credited as Chief Director (総監督, Sō Kantoku)); Yuichiro Yano
- Written by: Yōichi Katō
- Music by: monaca
- Studio: Sunrise
- Released: December 13, 2014
- Runtime: 89 minutes
- Anime film

Aikatsu! Music Awards: The Show Where Everyone Gets an Award!
- Directed by: Shinya Watada
- Written by: Yōichi Katō
- Music by: monaca
- Studio: BN Pictures
- Released: August 22, 2015
- Runtime: 56 minutes
- Anime film

Aikatsu! The Targeted Magical Aikatsu Card
- Directed by: Ryūichi Kimura
- Written by: Yōichi Katō
- Music by: monaca
- Studio: BN Pictures
- Released: August 13, 2016 (Note: Double-billed with Aikatsu Stars! The Movie)
- Runtime: 27 minutes
- Anime film

Aikatsu! 10th Story: Starway to the Future
- Directed by: Ryūichi Kimura
- Written by: Yōichi Katō
- Music by: monaca
- Studio: BN Pictures
- Released: July 15, 2022 (short film) (Note: Double-billed with Aikatsu Planet! The Movie); January 20, 2023 (feature film)
- Runtime: 25 minutes (short film); 72 minutes (feature film)
- Anime film

Aikatsu! Memorial Stage: Shining Unit Cup
- Directed by: Yūko Kakihara
- Written by: Yoichi Kato
- Music by: Avex Pictures
- Studio: BN Pictures
- Released: June 20, 2025
- Runtime: 93 minutes
- Anime film

Aikatsu! × PriPara: The Movie Deai no Kiseki!
- Directed by: Takahiro Okawa
- Written by: Michihiro Tsuchiya
- Music by: Avex Pictures
- Studio: BN Pictures
- Licensed by: SA/SEA: Medialink
- Released: October 10, 2025
- Runtime: 75 minutes
- Video games
- Aikatsu! (Data Carddass, 2012); Aikatsu! Cinderella Lesson (Nintendo 3DS, 2012); Aikatsu! Futari no My Princess (Nintendo 3DS, 2013); Aikatsu! 365-Hi no Idol Days (Nintendo 3DS, 2014); Aikatsu! My No.1 Stage! (Nintendo 3DS, 2015); Aikatsu! Fashion Coordinator Card (App, 2015); Aikatsu! Music Video Maker (App, 2015); Aikatsu! Photo on Stage (App, 2018); Aikatsu! Encore (Data Carddass, 2026)
- Other series
- Aikatsu! (2012); Aikatsu Stars! (2016); Aikatsu Friends! (2018); Aikatsu on Parade! (2019); Aikatsu Planet! (2021); Aikatsu Academy! (2024)
- icon

Aikatsu! (アイカツ!, Aikatsu!) is a multimedia franchise spawned from an arcade dress-up collectible card game in Bandai's Data Carddass line of machines, which launched in October 2012. The game revolves around using collectible cards featuring various clothes to help aspiring idols pass auditions. An anime television adaptation by Sunrise began airing on TV Tokyo from October 8, 2012, to March 31, 2016. It was succeeded by Aikatsu Stars! on April 7, 2016. In 2015, production switched from Sunrise to the studio's subsidiary Bandai Namco Pictures. Four films were released in December 2014, August 2015, August 2016, and January 2023 respectively. Three manga adaptations have been published by Shogakukan, along with four Nintendo 3DS games published by Bandai Namco Games.

== Plot ==
The series takes place at Starlight Academy (スターライト学園, Sutāraito Gakuen), a prestigious school with both middle and high school branches, where girls train to become idols and take part in various auditions such as live shows, fashion shows, and dramas. To participate in these auditions, players use Aikatsu cards, special cards that contain digitized dresses and accessories from various manufacturers that are used in their auditions. How well they succeed is often dependent on choosing the right combination of cards. The video games cast players in the role of a new student, who must train to become an idol and reach the top.

The anime series follows a girl named Ichigo Hoshimiya, who becomes inspired by a performance by top idol Mizuki Kanzaki and enrolls in Starlight Academy alongside her best friend, Aoi Kiriya. Along with their classmate, Ran Shibuki, Ichigo and Aoi spend each day training for auditions and aiming to become top idols.

The second season starts with Ichigo returning from America to Starlight Academy, as she now befriends and competes with the students from a new idol school, Dream Academy, which has Seira Otoshiro and her fellow idols.

The third season focuses on a new generation, featuring Akari Ōzora, a young girl chosen by Ichigo to join Starlight Academy, and her friends. They do their best in both the Partner's Cup & the Great Starlight School Festival.

The fourth season centers around Akari's new unit with Sumire Hikami and Hinaki Shinjo, Luminas, going on a nationwide tour and meeting with idols from all over Japan. These meetings prepare them for the big event - The Starlight Queen Cup.

== Terminology ==
Aikatsu Cards (アイカツ!カード, Aikatsu Kādo)
Aikatsu Cards are cards that contain digitised clothes which are worn by idols during performances and auditions. They are divided into four categories: Tops, Bottoms, Shoes, and Accessories, with some cards, such as one piece dresses, eliminating the need for others. The clothes come from various types of brands and have varying degrees of rarity. Although most clothes come in specific coordinations, players are also able to mix and match different cards to find a good combination.
Student Cards (学生証, Gakuseishō)
A student ID that represents a student of Starlight Academy, Dream Academy, Himezakura Private Girls' Academy or Étoile Academy and is required to access the Aikatsu System. In the arcade game, these are IC Cards used to store a player's history and create original characters.
In the actual arcade game, student cards are represented by Data Carddass (DCD) System's IC cards with Starlight Academy pattern. Players may use DCD IC cards to save gameplay and create avatar characters.
Aikatsu System (アイカツシステム, Aikatsu Shisutemu)
The system in which Aikatsu Cards are utilised. When performing in an audition or performance, idols step through a dressing room, which requires them to insert their student pass and choice of Aikatsu Cards, where they put on their selected clothes. The stage they walk on is largely digitised, providing various holographic displays and special effects during the performance and allowing people to participate in the audience via online streaming. The system reads the emotions of spectators, along with the online spectators, to rate each idol's performance, which determines their success during auditions.
Aikatsu Phone (アイカツフォン, Aikatsu Fon)
A handheld phone issued to each student of Starlight Academy. As well as providing various smartphone functions, such as calls, maps and a social network service, the Aikatsu Phone allows students to schedule and apply for auditions, as well as store and utilise their Aikatsu Cards for various purposes, such as holographically trying out coords. There are also a set of lights that are lit up when a student achieves a symbol pertaining to a certain idol quality.
Special Appeal (スペシャルアピール, Supesharu Apīru)
A Special Appeal is a technique that is used during a performance, bring an illusion the stage. The types of appeal that can be performed vary depending on the types of clothes worn. Normally, idols are only able to perform a maximum of two or three Special Appeals during a performance, but Mizuki has been able to perform four, which considered to be Legends.
Brands (ブランド, Burando)
Fashion companies, each managed by a top designer, who design clothes for idols and convert them into Aikatsu Cards that can be used by the Aikatsu System. There are nineteen known brands in the first series: Angely Sugar, Futuring Girl, Spicy Ageha, Happy Rainbow, LoLi GoThiC, Aurora Fantasy, Love Queen, Magical Toy, Swing ROCK, Bohemian Sky, Vivid Kiss, Love Moonrise, Dreamy Crown, Sangria Rosa, Sakurairo Kaden, Dance Fusion, Retro Clover, Dolly Devil and Mecha PaniQ.
Constellation System (星座システム, Seiza Shisutemu)
The brand new line of dresses made from the top designers who teamed up to come up with it. A Constellation Appeal is a technique that is used during a performance like a Special Appeal but is only performed when wearing Constellation dresses. This is performed when the performer has maxed out the audience's voltage meter before they can perform the appeal.

== Media ==
=== Video games ===
The Aikatsu! arcade game from Bandai began appearing in Japanese arcades from October 2012 as part of its Data Carddass line. The game revolves around using collectible cards to help idols pass their auditions. A handheld title, Aikatsu! Cinderella Lesson (アイカツ! シンデレラレッスン, Aikatsu! Shinderera Ressun), was released for the Nintendo 3DS on November 15, 2012. A second 3DS game, titled Aikatsu! Futari no My Princess (アイカツ！2人のmy princess, Aikatsu! My Two Princesses), released on November 21, 2013. A third 3DS game, titled Aikatsu! 365-Nichi no Idol Days (アイカツ！365日のアイドルデイズ, Aikatsu! 365-Nichi no Aidoru Deizu), released on December 4, 2014. A fourth 3DS game, titled Aikatsu! My No.1 Stage! (アイカツ！My No.1 Stage!), released on November 26, 2015.

=== Anime ===
An anime television series produced by Sunrise began airing on TV Tokyo from October 8, 2012, replacing Yu-Gi-Oh! Zexal in its initial timeslot. A second season began airing from October 3, 2013, with a third to begin airing in October 2014. Daisuki began streaming the series from September 4, 2014. Sunrise's director, Masayuki Ozaki, has stated Aikatsu may be considered for a US release if fans are vocal enough about it.

=== Films ===
Aikatsu! The Movie, was released on December 13, 2014.

Aikatsu! Music Awards: The Show Where Everyone Gets an Award!, was released on August 22, 2015.

Aikatsu! The Targeted Magical Aikatsu Card, was released on August 13, 2016.

Aikatsu! 10th Story: Starway to the Future, was released on July 15, 2022 (short ver.) and was released on January 20, 2023 (full length ver.).

Aikatsu! Memorial Stage: Shining Unit Cup, was released on June 20, 2025.

Aikatsu! x PriPara: The Movie – Miraculous Meeting, was released on October 10, 2025.

=== Drama CD ===
A Drama CD, Aikatsu! Great Starmiya Ichigo Festival: After-party Special!, was released alongside Aikatsu! The Movie.

=== Music ===
The series contains a variety of theme songs and insert songs. Many of the songs are composed and arranged by Monoca, and performed by members of the Japanese idol group Star Anis and Aikatsu Stars who provide the singing voices for the characters.

=== Printed media ===
A manga adaption, published by Shogakukan and illustrated by Bambi Shirayuki, was serialized in Ciao.

== Legacy ==
The Aikatsu! franchise was succeeded three successive series including one spin-off series and one virtual idol project. The second series, Aikatsu Stars! launched in May 2016 with an anime airing between April 2016 and March 2018. The third series, Aikatsu Friends! launched in April 2018 with an anime airing between April 2018 and September 2019. A first spin-off series, Aikatsu on Parade!, which set at alternate reality features characters from alternate version of Aikatsu!, Stars! and Friends! launched in October 2019, with an anime airing between October 2019 and March 2020. The fourth series, Aikatsu Planet! launched in December 2020, with a tokusatsu/anime hybrid series airing from January to June 2021. A VTuber project and The fifth series, Aikatsu Academy! launched in July 2024, with initial three talents; Mieru Himeno, Mamiru Meh, and Wao Parin, while new talent, Rindou Taimu was added in November 2024 until their final streaming at April 2026.

== Reception ==
Rebecca Silverman from Anime News Network (ANN) commented that the anime series is "really a half-hour commercial for a card game aimed at elementary-aged girls, or at least it seems that way", but despite this she noted "there's something fun about this show and its toy-bright colors". Silverman said Aikatsu! is a show for someone "looking for some brainless fun with a toe-tapping yet saccharine soundtrack, you're a seven-year-old girl, or if you just really like the color pink". Theron Martin also from ANN described it as "essentially a complement to a like-named card game aimed at teen and preteen girls". ANN's Carlo Santos agreed that it's a commercial-like anime, but also criticized the animation, saying the "quality is barely enough to get by, and the character designs look oddly outdated." Carl Kimlinger's opinion was less negative as he said Aikatsu! "isn't terrible by any stretch, but it doesn't make even a desultory effort to differentiate itself from the dozens of other shows that use aspiring idols to sell games and figurines and god knows what else" and that "character designs also have a lovely shōjo flavor, and the whole series looks just as pink and pretty as can be." He finished telling it will be "a highly tolerable diversion" for those who like this kind of anime.

The film earned ¥172,727,250 at the Japanese box office on its first weekend. As of February 21, 2016, it had grossed US$782,739 in South Korea.

== See also ==
- Pretty Rhythm
