= Aikatsu! 10th Story: Starway to the Future =

Film by Ryuichi Kimura

- Theatrical release poster
- Japanese: アイカツ！ 10th STORY 未来へのSTARWAY
- Revised Hepburn: Aikatsu! 10th Sutōri: Mirai e no Sutāwai
- Directed by: Ryuichi Kimura
- Screenplay by: Yoichi Katō
- Based on: Aikatsu! by BN Pictures and Bandai
- Produced by: Dai Kimura; Kohei Fukuda
- Starring: Sumire Morohoshi; Shino Shimoji; Azusa Tadokoro; Ayaka Ōhashi
- Cinematography: Yoichi Oogami
- Edited by: Kazuhiro Arai
- Music by: monaca
- Production company: BN Pictures
- Distributed by: BN Pictures
- Release dates: July 15, 2022 (short ver.); January 20, 2023 (full length ver.)
- Running time: 25 minutes (short ver.); 72 minutes (full length ver.)
- Country: Japan
- Language: Japanese

Aikatsu! 10th Story: Starway to the Future (Japanese: アイカツ！ 10th STORY 未来へのSTARWAY, Hepburn: Aikatsu! 10th Sutōri: Mirai e no Sutāwai) is a Japanese animated musical dance film directed by Ryuichi Kimura and written by Yoichi Katō; the film is based on the Aikatsu! series by BN Pictures, whom also produced and distributed the film. Starway to the Future celebrates the 10th anniversary of the Aikatsu! franchise, with the story set after the series finale, and follows Ichigo, Aoi and Ran's decision on their path after their final year at Starlight Academy. The film stars the voices of Sumire Morohoshi, Shino Shimoji, Azusa Tadokoro, and Ayaka Ōhashi.

Starway to the Future was first released in Japan on July 15, 2022, as a short film, double featuring with Aikatsu Planet! The Movie, and later as a full-length feature film on January 20, 2023.

== Plot ==
While Akari is shining as Starlight Queen, she and Ichigo recently had a successful live event as a duo, "Cosmos". As Ichigo is in her third year at Starlight School's high school division, she, Aoi, and Ran must take their paths with caution for what lies ahead.

== Voice cast ==
- Sumire Morohoshi as Ichigo Hoshimiya
- Azusa Tadokoro as Aoi Kiriya
- Ayaka Ōhashi as Ran Shibuki
- Tomoyo Kurosawa as Otome Arisugawa
- Manami Munakura as Yurika Todo
- Yuna Mimura as Kaede Ichinose
- Asami Seto as Shion Kamiya
- Kiyono Yasuno as Sakura Kitaōji
- Minako Kotobuki as Mizuki Kanzaki
- Shino Shimoji as Akari Ōzora
- Yū Wakui as Sumire Hikami
- Yui Ishikawa as Hinaki Shinjō

== Production ==
The short and the full-length feature version was produced by the same key staff members from Aikatsu! television series, with Ryuichi Kimura, Yoichi Kato and Hiroko Yaguchi returning as a director, screenwriter and character designer respectively.

== Release ==
The film was first released in theaters in Japan on July 15, 2022, as a short film, double feature with Aikatsu Planet! The Movie. A full-length feature film version was released in theaters in Japan on January 20, 2023, and was re-released in theaters in Japan on March 8, 2024, in celebration of Ichigo's birthday the next week.

== Reception ==
Along with Aikatsu Planet! The Movie, the short film failed to make it in the top 10 in the Japanese box office. The full-length film version debuted at number 10 out of top 10 in the Japanese box office in its opening weekend.
