= KamiErabi God.app =

Japanese anime television series

- Key visual

カミエラビ (Kamierabi)
- Created by: Yoko Taro
- Anime television series
- Directed by: Hiroyuki Seshita
- Written by: Jin
- Music by: Monaca
- Studio: Unend
- Licensed by: Crunchyroll
- Original network: Fuji TV (+Ultra)
- Original run: October 5, 2023 – December 19, 2024
- Episodes: 24
- icon

KamiErabi God.app (Japanese: カミエラビ, Hepburn: Kamierabi) is an original Japanese anime television series. Created by Yoko Taro, produced by Unend, and directed by Hiroyuki Seshita, the series aired on Fuji TV's +Ultra programming block, with its first season airing from October to December 2023, and the second season airing from October to December 2024.

== Premise ==
Goro is a normal high school student whose life is turned upside down one day after noticing a new app on his phone. The app requires chosen "God candidates" to confront each other in a violent battle royale in which the last remaining survivor will become God.

== Characters ==
Goro (ゴロー, Gorō)
Voiced by: Kazuki Ura
Honoka (ホノカ)
Voiced by: Sara Matsumoto
Akitsu (アキツ)
Voiced by: Shūichi Uchida
Chika (チカ)
Voiced by: Natsuko Abe
Kōki (コウキ)
Voiced by: Gakuto Kajiwara
Iyo (イヨ)
Voiced by: Tomori Kusunoki
Mitsuko (ミツコ)
Voiced by: Fairouz Ai
Tatsuya (タツヤ)
Voiced by: Yuuki Shin
Lall (ラル, Raru)
Voiced by: Ayane Sakura
Ryō
Voiced by: Aoi Yuki
Kyō
Voiced by: Chiaki Kobayashi
Eko Sasaki
Voiced by: Misaki Kuno

== Production and release ==
The series was announced during the "Fuji TV Anime Lineup Presentation 2023" in March 2023. It is created by Yoko Taro, produced by Unend and directed by Hiroyuki Seshita, with scripts written by Jin, character designs by Atsushi Ohkubo, and music composed by Monaca. The series aired from October 5 to December 21, 2023, on Fuji TV's +Ultra programming block. (Note: Fuji TV lists the series premiere as October 4, 2023, at 24:55, which is effectively October 5 at 12:55 a.m. JST.) The opening theme song is "Scrap & Build", performed by Elaiza, while the ending theme song is "Bleed My Heart", performed by Alisa. Crunchyroll streamed the series outside of Asia.

A second season was announced in October 2023, and aired from October 3 to December 19, 2024, on the same programming block. (Note: Fuji TV lists the second season's premiere as October 2, 2024, at 24:55, which is effectively October 3 at 12:55 a.m. JST.) The opening theme song is "Fūka" (風化, Weathering), performed by Nanashi no Tarō, while the ending theme song is "Kōfuku no Susume" (幸福のすゝめ, Advice for Happiness), performed by Leevelles.

=== Episodes ===
==== Season 1 ====
No. overall	No. in season	Title	Original release date
1	1	"Unnoticed by Anyone, in the Place of Which Everyone Dreams"; Transliteration: "Dare Ni mo Kizukarenai, Dare Shimo ga Yume ni Miru Basho de" (Japanese: 誰にも気付かれない、誰しもが夢に見る場所で)	October 5, 2023
2	2	"Is He Strong, Is He Weak?"; Transliteration: "Aitsu ga Tsuyoi Toka, Yowai Toka" (Japanese: あいつが強いとか、弱いとか)	October 12, 2023
3	3	"You're the Finest of Friends"; Transliteration: "Omae tte, Saikō no Tomodachita" (Japanese: お前って、最高の友達だ)	October 19, 2023
4	4	"What That Means Is We're Kindred Spirits"; Transliteration: "Sore Sunawachi, Watashitachi wa Dōshi, Toiu Koto" (Japanese: ソレすなわち、私たちは同志、ということ)	October 26, 2023
5	5	"So Upright and Strong"; Transliteration: "Massugude, Tsuyoi, Anata ni wa" (Japanese: まっすぐで、強い、あなたには)	November 2, 2023
6	6	"Form, Voice, Memories, and Even the Pain"; Transliteration: "Sugata mo, Koe mo, Kioku mo, Sono Itami Made" (Japanese: 姿も、声も、記憶も、その痛みまで)	November 9, 2023
7	7	"Close Your Eyes, Cover Your Ears, and Afterwards"; Transliteration: "Me o Tsumutte, Mimi o Fusaide, Sono Ato" (Japanese: 目を瞑って、耳を塞いで、そのあと)	November 16, 2023
8	8	"Introductions Will Have to Wait"; Transliteration: "Jiko Shōkai wa Atomawashi tte Kotode" (Japanese: 自己紹介は後回しってことで)	November 23, 2023
9	9	"If You Took a Trip, Where Would You Want to Go?"; Transliteration: "Ryokō Ikunara Doko Ikitai?" (Japanese: 旅行行くならどこ行きたい？)	November 30, 2023
10	10	"It's Not Rain That's Falling"; Transliteration: "Futteiru no Wa, ame Janai" (Japanese: 降っているのは、雨じゃない)	December 7, 2023
11	11	"The Light Hasn't Reached Us Yet"; Transliteration: "Mada Bokura Made, Hikari ga Todoiteinai nda" (Japanese: まだ僕らまで、光が届いていないんだ)	December 14, 2023
12	12	"My Wish Belongs to Me"; Transliteration: "Watashi no Negaida Mono" (Japanese: 私の願いだもの)	December 21, 2023

==== Season 2 ====
No. overall	No. in season	Title	Original release date
13	1	"That's Why It Needed God"; Transliteration: "Dakara, Kamisama ga Hitsuyō Datta nda" (Japanese: だから、神様が必要だったんだ)	October 3, 2024
14	2	"Finally, My Purpose in Life"; Transliteration: "Yōyaku, Jibun ga Umareta Imi o" (Japanese: ようやく、自分が生まれた意味を)	October 10, 2024
15	3	"Unless You Put Your Sorrow behind You, Happiness Is Just an Illusion"; Transliteration: "Fukō o Nakatta Koto ni Shinē Kagiri, Shiawase Nante Tada no Kanchigai Daro" (Japanese: 不幸をなかったことにしねえ限り、幸せなんてただの勘違いだろ)	October 17, 2024
16	4	"You're the Last Person I Want to Let Become God"; Transliteration: "Anatatakewa, Zettai ni Kamisama ni Shitaku Arimasen kara" (Japanese: あなただけは、絶対に神様にしたくありませんから)	October 24, 2024
17	5	"The World Was Already Messed Up"; Transliteration: "Sekai wa Tokkuni, Okashi Kattante Suyo" (Japanese: 世界はとっくに、おかしかったんですよ)	October 31, 2024
18	6	"So Don't Cry, It'll Be Okay"; Transliteration: "Dakara Nakanaide, Daijōbu Dakara" (Japanese: だから泣かないで、大丈夫だから)	November 7, 2024
19	7	"If You Want to Save the World, Just Tap That Smartphone"; Transliteration: "Sekai o Sukuitai Nara, Sono Sumaho o Taffusurewaii" (Japanese: 世界を救いたいなら、そのスマホをタップすればいい)	November 14, 2024
20	8	"I Thought Up My Own Lines"; Transliteration: "Ore no Serifu wa Ore ka Kangaeta nta yo" (Japanese: 俺のセリフは俺が考えたんだよ)	November 21, 2024
21	9	"I Mean, of Course, It's... Me"; Transliteration: "Atarimaejan, Watashi……Nandakara" (Japanese: 当たり前じゃん、私……なんだから)	November 28, 2024
22	10	"Everything Turned Out Like This Because You Wanted It To"; Transliteration: "Konna Koto ni Natta no wa, Zenbu Omae ka Nozonta Karata" (Japanese: こんなことになったのは、全部お前が望んだからだ)	December 5, 2024
23	11	"Even If It Means Ruining This Story"; Transliteration: "Kono Monogatari o Dainashi ni Shita Toshite mo" (Japanese: この物語を台無しにしたとしても)	December 12, 2024
24	12	"The Next World You Write Will Be"; Transliteration: "Anata ka Egaku Tsugi no Sekai wa" (Japanese: あなたが描く次の世界は)	December 19, 2024
