= Ryoko Maekawa =

Japanese actress

Ryōko Maekawa
- 前川 涼子
- Born: August 6 Kanagawa Prefecture, Japan
- Occupations: Actress; voice actress
- Years active: 2012-present
- Agent: Asleben
- Father: Atsushi Maekawa

Ryoko Maekawa (前川涼子, Maekawa Ryōko; born August 6) is a Japanese voice actress from Kanagawa Prefecture, affiliated with Asleben. She is known for her roles as Yumine Fuda in Magic of Stella, Ayane Mizuno in Tsuki ga Kirei, Tenka Ōsaki in The Idolmaster Shiny Colors, Kansuke in Sing "Yesterday" for Me, Hanabi Natsubayashi in Bottom-tier Character Tomozaki, Collei in Genshin Impact, and Lynne in I Parry Everything. She is the daughter of screenwriter Atsushi Maekawa.

== Biography ==
Ryoko Maekawa, a native of Kanagawa Prefecture, was born on 6 August. Her father is Atsushi Maekawa, an anime and tokusatsu screenwriter. She was educated at Sagami Women's University Department of Social Management and at Human Academy. She joined the voice acting agency Atomic Monkey in 2014.

In 2016, she starred as Yumine Fuda in Magic of Stella. She later voiced Ayane Mizuno in Tsuki ga Kirei (2017), Higuchi in Asobi Asobase (2018), Miu Mishima in Da Capo 4 (2019), Kansuke in Sing "Yesterday" for Me (2020), and Hanabi Natsubayashi in Bottom-tier Character Tomozaki (2021–present). In 2023, she was part of the quartet Shadow Garden Numbers when they performed "Polaris in the Night", the ending theme for The Eminence in Shadow anime's second season. She will voice Lynne in the 2024 anime I Parry Everything.

In 2018, she was cast as Tenka Ōsaki, one of the three members of the unit Alstroemeria, in The Idolmaster Shiny Colors, a spinoff of The Idolmaster franchise. She performed in several Alstroemeria singles, several of which charted in the Top 10 of the Oricon Singles Chart. She reprised her role in the 2024 anime adaptation.

She left Atomic Monkey on July 31, 2025 and joined Asleben on August 1.

Her hobbies and special skills include competitive karuta and volleyball.

== Filmography ==
=== Television animation ===
| Year | Title | Role | Ref. |
|---|---|---|---|
| 2012 | Fairy Tail | Children, crew member, Tome Man | |
| 2014 | Bladedance of Elementalers | Knight of Sylphide, others | |
| 2014 | Your Lie in April | Softball club member | |
| 2015 | Gon | Bou | |
| 2015 | Mikagura School Suite | Friend, customer | |
| 2015 | High School DxD Born | Pawn | |
| 2015 | Hello!! Kin-iro Mosaic | Broadcaster | |
| 2015 | Ultimate Otaku Teacher | Student A | |
| 2016 | Kindaichi Case Files R | Nurse | |
| 2016 | Yu-Gi-Oh! Arc-V | Sayaka Sasayama | |
| 2016 | Haven't You Heard? I'm Sakamoto | Female child | |
| 2016 | Detective Conan | Zombie | |
| 2016 | Magic of Stella | Yumine Fuda | |
| 2017 | March Comes In like a Lion | Student | |
| 2017 | Tsuki ga Kirei | Ayane Mizuno | |
| 2017 | Hinako Note | Female customer | |
| 2017 | Just Because! | Broadcast Club president | |
| 2017 | Children of the Whales | Furano | |
| 2018 | Persona 5: The Animation | Newscaster | |
| 2018 | Asobi Asobase | Higuchi, shogi club manager | |
| 2018 | Layton Mystery Tanteisha: Katori no Nazotoki File | Rose Albin | |
| 2018 | That Time I Got Reincarnated as a Slime | Elf | |
| 2018 | Gurazeni | Yuki's friend | |
| 2018 | Ms. Vampire Who Lives in My Neighborhood | Girl B | |
| 2019 | RobiHachi | Hostess | |
| 2019 | Fruits Basket | Tohru's cousin | |
| 2019 | Ojarumaru | Usui Sachiyo's classmate, Soba | |
| 2019 | Hitori Bocchi no Marumaru Seikatsu | Tatakudo Ramu | |
| 2019 | Cop Craft: Dragnet Mirage Reloaded | Amy Fury | |
| 2019 | Z/X Code reunion | Yūki Sasagamine | |
| 2020 | Interspecies Reviewers | Tsuta | |
| 2020 | Sing "Yesterday" for Me | Kansuke | |
| 2021 | Bottom-tier Character Tomozaki-kun | Hanabi Natsubayashi | |
| 2021 | Otherside Picnic | Cafe clerk | |
| 2021 | Cardfight!! Vanguard overDress | Station attendant | |
| 2022 | The Eminence in Shadow | Omega | |
| 2022 | The Executioner and Her Way of Life | Shop clerk | |
| 2022 | Mobile Suit Gundam: The Witch from Mercury | Ireesha Plano | |
| 2022 | Trapped in a Dating Sim: The World of Otome Games Is Tough for Mobs | Noble girl | |
| 2023 | Oshi no Ko | High school girl | |
| 2024 | Beyblade X | Yuni Namba | |
| 2024 | The Idolmaster Shiny Colors | Tenka Ōsaki | |
| 2024 | I Parry Everything | Lynne | |
| 2026 | Thunder 3 | Mio Kisaragi | |

=== Anime films ===
| Year | Title | Role | Ref. |
|---|---|---|---|
| 2013 | Gintama: The Movie: The Final Chapter: Be Forever Yorozuya | | |
| 2021 | Shimajiro the Movie: Shimajiro and the Flying Ship | Mordi's Third Son | |
| 2022 | The Anthem of the Heart | Chiho Tochikura | |
| 2023 | Yu-Gi-Oh! The Dark Side of Dimensions | | |

=== Original net animation ===
| Year | Title | Role | Ref. |
|---|---|---|---|
| 2019 | Kengan Ashura | Kokoro Yoshizawa | |

=== Video games ===
| Year | Title | Role | Ref. |
|---|---|---|---|
| 2017 | Honkai Impact 3rd | Wendy | |
| 2017 | Kirara Fantasia | Yumine Fuda | |
| 2018 | Kotodaman | | |
| 2018 | The Idolmaster Shiny Colors | Tenka Ōsaki | |
| 2018 | Libra of Precatus | Camilla Sterling | |
| 2019 | Da Capo 4 | Miu Mishima | |
| 2019 | Memories of Link | Erika | |
| 2020 | Final Gear | PN26 Illeheath | |
| 2021 | The Idolmaster Starlit Season | Tenka Ōsaki | |
| 2022 | Heaven Burns Red | Yuki Izumi | |
| 2022 | Eternal Tree | Siltear | |
| 2022 | Azur Lane | RN Bolzano | |
| 2022 | Genshin Impact | Collei | |
| 2022 | Fitness Boxing | Lin | |
| 2023 | The Idolmaster Shiny Colors: Song for Prism | Tenka Ōsaki | |
