= Bandai Namco Pictures =

Japanese animation studio

Bandai Namco Pictures Inc.

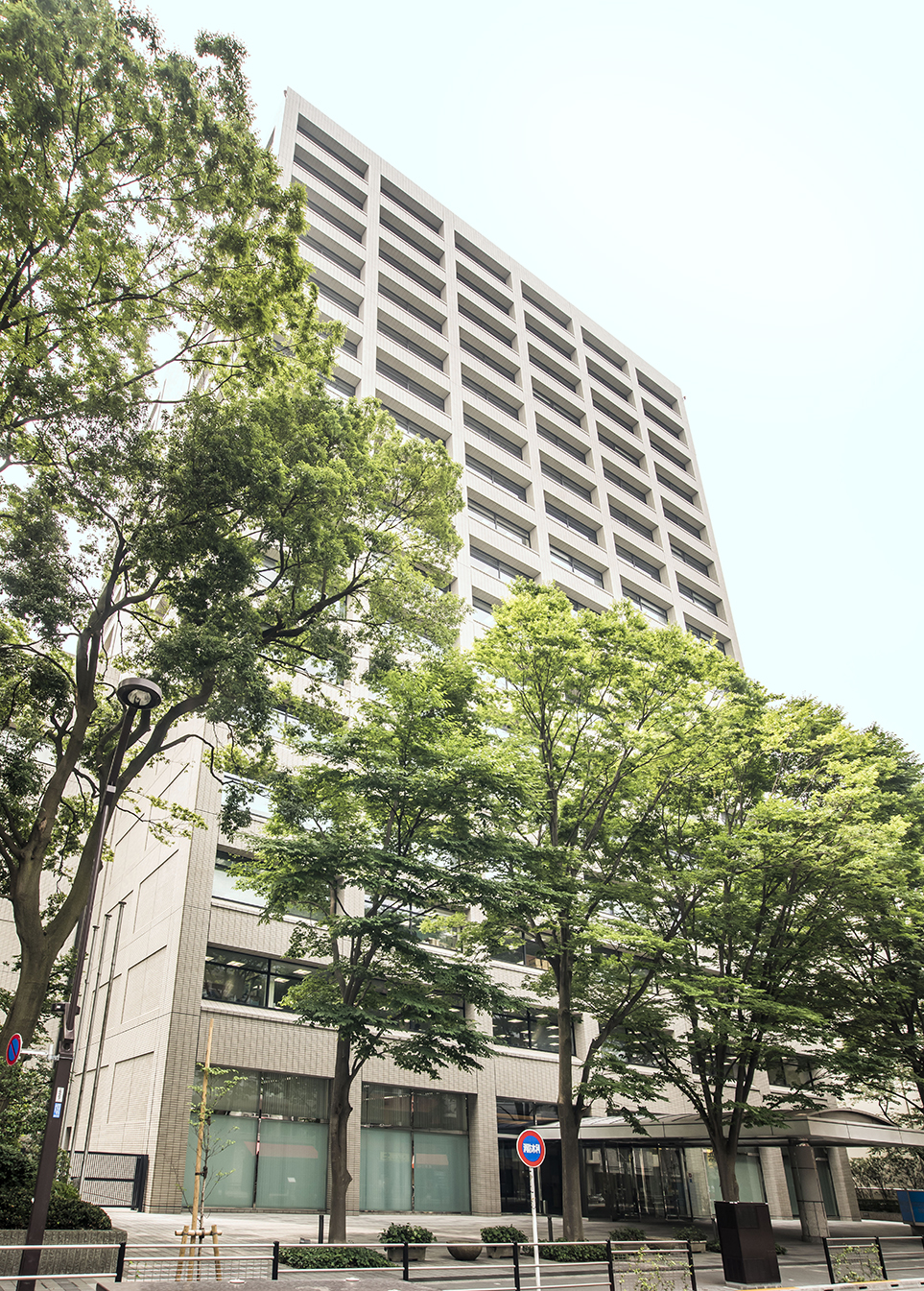
- Headquarters in Suginami, Tokyo
- Trade name: BN Pictures
- Native name: 株式会社バンダイナムコピクチャーズ
- Romanized name: Kabushiki gaisha Bandai Namuko Pikuchāzu
- Type: Subsidiary
- Industry: Animation studio; Character licensing; Home entertainment
- Founded: April 2015; 11 years ago
- Headquarters: Ogikubo, Suginami, Tokyo, Japan
- Key people: Hiroyuki Satou (president and CEO)
- Revenue: ¥10 million
- Owner: Sunrise Inc. (2015–2022); Bandai Namco Filmworks (2022–present)
- Number of employees: 130 (December 2021)
- Divisions: BN Pictures Creative Room; BN Pictures Osaka Studio; BN Pictures Iwaki Studio (Studio Dub)
- Website: www.bn-pictures.co.jp
- Footnotes "Corporate Profile". www.bn-pictures.co.jp (in Japanese). Bandai Namco Pictures. Archived from the original on April 28, 2020.

Secondary logo used for the animation studio division since 2015.

Bandai Namco Pictures Inc., (Note: Japanese: 株式会社バンダイナムコピクチャーズ, Hepburn: Kabushiki-gaisha Bandai Namuko Pikuchāzu; BNP) also branded as BN Pictures (Note: Japanese: BNピクチャーズ, Hepburn: Bi En Pikuchāzu) is a Japanese animation studio. It is a spinoff of Sunrise, a subsidiary of Bandai Namco Filmworks which is owned by Bandai Namco Holdings. The company was formed as a part of the medium-term management plan of Bandai Namco Holdings on restructuring itself. All the anime intellectual property, copyright and production divisions of Sunrise that target children and family were transferred to BN Pictures such as Sgt. Frog, the Battle Spirits series, the Aikatsu series, the Gintama series, the Zorori series among others. Aside from its animation studio operations, the company also handles character licensing and domestic video releases for its works. The company began its operations in April 2015.

== History ==
On February 12, 2015, Bandai Namco Holdings announced plans to restructure itself through the usage of a three-year medium-management plan. The company sought to focus its resources on creating new intellectual properties (IPs) and marketable characters, and required faster planning and development time to satisfy these demands. Bandai Namco executives also believed it was necessary for its IP Creation content area to strengthen ties with its Toy and Hobby area, as it would lead to both strong relationships between the two divisions and allow for future product collaborations.

As part of its efforts to fulfill these obligations, Bandai Namco Pictures was established in April 2015 in Nerima, Tokyo. Headed by Masayuki Ozaki, the representative director of animation studio Sunrise, the company was to lead its parent's "Strengthen IP Creation Output" project and focus on the creation of new characters and franchises, specifically those targeted towards children and families. Bandai Namco Pictures would also work together with the Toy and Hobby division of Bandai Namco Holdings to strengthen the linkage between the two areas of the latter company. BNP absorbed Sunrise's production departments and copyrights relating to children-oriented IPs, becoming a wholly owned subsidiary of Sunrise and part of Bandai Namco's IP Creation department.

The company's first project was Aikatsu!, an anime based on the Bandai trading card arcade game of the same name which had been produced by Sunrise until that point. In addition to working on pre-established franchises, BNP would produce several original projects, such as the stop-motion animation series Milpom! BNP focused primarily on series and characters targeted towards children and families, though some, such as Tiger & Bunny and the Gintama series, were aimed at older audiences. The company regularly collaborates with other subsidiaries within Bandai Namco Holdings; in 2016, it partnered with Bandai Namco Entertainment to produce Dream Festival!, a multimedia franchise centered around video games and original net animations.

In August 2018, BNP opened a division in Osaka, the BN Pictures Osaka Studio, for the purpose of digitally transferring animation to decrease production times. The company hoped the success and productivity from the Osaka Studio could allow for additional offices to be opened in Japan and eventually overseas. A year later in October, BNP absorbed Studio Dub, an animation subcontractor established by former Sunrise animators. The acquisition renamed the company BN Pictures Iwaki, though it continues using the name Studio Dub for its projects.

== Works ==
=== Television series ===
| Title | Director(s) | First run start date | First run end date | Broadcast network(s) | Eps. | Notes | Ref. |
|---|---|---|---|---|---|---|---|
| Battle Spirits: Burning Soul | Kunihisa Sugishima | April 1, 2015 | March 30, 2016 | TV Tokyo | 51 | Original work, Battle Spirits production produced by BN Pictures | |
| Tribe Cool Crew | Masaya Fujimori | April 5, 2015 (Note: First episode under BN Pictures) | October 4, 2015 | Nagoya TV, TV Asahi | 26 (Note: Total number of episodes under BN Pictures) | Original work, took over production from Sunrise | |
| Gintama° | Chizuru Miyawaki | April 8, 2015 | March 30, 2016 | TV Tokyo | 51 | Based on the Gintama manga series by Hideaki Sorachi, first Gintama production produced by BN Pictures | |
| Aikatsu! | Ryūichi Kimura | October 1, 2015 | March 31, 2016 | TV Tokyo | 26 | Original work, took over production from Sunrise | |
| Brave Beats | Yūta Murano | October 6, 2015 | March 27, 2016 | Nagoya TV, TV Asahi | 22 | Original work | |
| Battle Spirits: Double Drive | Kunihisa Sugishima | April 6, 2016 | March 29, 2017 | TV Tokyo | 51 | Original work, second Battle Spirits production produced by BN Pictures | |
| Aikatsu Stars! | Teruo Satō | April 7, 2016 | March 29, 2018 | TV Tokyo | 100 | Original work | |
| Heybot! | Shinji Ishihira | September 18, 2016 | September 24, 2017 | Nagoya TV, TV Asahi | 50 | Original work | |
| Gintama. | Chizuru Miyawaki | January 8, 2017 | October 7, 2018 | TV Tokyo | 51 | Second Gintama production produced by BN Pictures; Also known as Gintama. Porori-hen and Gintama. Shirogane no Tamashii-hen | |
| Aikatsu Friends! | Shishō Igarashi | April 5, 2018 | September 26, 2019 | TV Tokyo | 76 | Original work | |
| B-PROJECT～Zecchō＊Emotion～ | Makoto Moriwaki | January 11, 2019 | March 29, 2019 | Tokyo MX | 12 | Original work | |
| Aikatsu on Parade! | Shishō Igarashi | October 5, 2019 | March 28, 2020 | TV Tokyo | 25 | Original work | |
| Welcome to Demon School! Iruma-kun | Makoto Moriwaki | October 5, 2019 | present | NHK Educational TV | 65 | Renewed for season 4 | |
| Zorori the Naughtier Hero | Takahide Ogata | April 5, 2020 | September 21, 2022 | NHK Educational TV | 75 | Based on the Kaiketsu Zorori book series by Yutaka Hara, co-production with Ajiado | |
| Saikyō Kamizmode | Mitsutoshi Satō | October 9, 2020 | April 9, 2021 | Tokyo MX | 26 | Original work, first premiered on BN Pictures' YouTube channel on September 28, 2020 before launching on television. | |
| Aikatsu Planet! | Ryūichi Kimura | January 10, 2021 | June 27, 2021 | TV Tokyo | 25 | Original work, live-action/anime hybrid | |
| Cestvs: The Roman Fighter (Note: BN Pictures is producing the series and is responsible for the 2D animation work, whereas Logic&Magic is responsible for the 3D animation work.) | Toshifumi Kawase (Note: Credited as Chief Director.); Kazuya Monma | April 15, 2021 | June 24, 2021 | Fuji TV | 11 | Based on the manga series by Shizuya Wazarai | |
| Birdie Wing: Golf Girls' Story | Takayuki Inagaki | April 6, 2022 | June 24, 2023 | TV Tokyo | 25 | Original work | |
| Raven of the Inner Palace | Chizuru Miyawaki | October 1, 2022 | December 24, 2022 | Tokyo MX | 13 | Based on the light novel series by Kōko Shirakawa | |
| Malevolent Spirits: Mononogatari | Ryūichi Kimura | January 10, 2023 | September 19, 2023 | Tokyo MX | 24 | Based on the manga series by Oniguzou | |
| Wistoria: Wand and Sword | Tatsuya Yoshihara (Note: Credited as chief director for season 2.); Hideaki Nakano | July 7, 2024 | present | TBS | 12 | Based on the manga series written by Fujino Ōmori and illustrated by Toshi Aoi, co-production with Actas | |
| I Left My A-Rank Party to Help My Former Students Reach the Dungeon Depths! | Katsumi Ono | January 12, 2025 | June 29, 2025 | Nippon TV | 24 | Based on the light novel series by Kōsuke Unagi | |
| Mashin Creator Wataru | Yumi Kamakura | January 12, 2025 | June 22, 2025 | TV Tokyo | 24 | Fourth installment in Sunrise's Mashin Hero Wataru series | |
| Rock Is a Lady's Modesty | Shinya Watada | April 3, 2025 | June 26, 2025 | TBS | 13 | Based on the manga series by Hiroshi Fukuda | |
| Shabake | Takahiro Ōkawa | October 3, 2025 | December 26, 2025 | Fuji TV | 13 | Based on the novel series by Megumi Hatanaka | |
| Gintama: Mr. Ginpachi's Zany Class | Makoto Moriwaki; Natsumi Higashida | October 7, 2025 | December 23, 2025 | TV Tokyo | 12 | Based on the light novel series written by Tomohiko Ōsaki and illustrated by Hideaki Sorachi, spin-off to the Gintama franchise | |
| Keroro☆ | Nobuhiro Kondo; Akihiko Sano | October 3, 2026 | TBA | TV Tokyo | TBA | Based on the Sgt. Frog manga series by Mine Yoshizaki | |
| Battle Spirits Re Zekkai no Kū | Masashi Kudo | October 6, 2026 | TBA | Tokyo MX | TBA | Original work, Battle Spirits production produced by BN Pictures | |

=== Films ===
| Title | Director(s) | Release date | Distributor | Notes |
|---|---|---|---|---|
| Incredible Zorori: Heroes of Space | Tomoko Iwasaki | September 12, 2015 | Tokyo Theaters | Co-produced with Ajiado |
| Aikatsu! Music Awards – The Show Where Everyone Gets an Award! | Shinya Watada | August 22, 2015 | Toei Company | |
| Aikatsu Stars! The Movie | Shinya Watada | August 13, 2016 | Toei Company | |
| Aikatsu! The Targeted Magical Aikatsu Card | Ryūichi Kimura | August 13, 2016 | Toei Company | Double-billed with Aikatsu Stars! The Movie |
| Incredible Zorori: Secret of the Double Z | Masaya Fujimori | November 22, 2017 | Tokyo Theaters | Co-produced with Ajiado |
| Gintama: The Very Final | Chizuru Miyawaki | January 8, 2021 | Warner Bros. Pictures | |
| Hula Fulla Dance | Seiji Mizushima; Shinya Watada | December 3, 2021 | Aniplex | |
| Aikatsu Planet! The Movie | Ryūichi Kimura | July 15, 2022 | BN Pictures | |
| Aikatsu! 10th Story: Starway to the Future | Ryūichi Kimura | July 15, 2022 (short film); January 20, 2023 (feature film) | BN Pictures | The short-film version was double-billed with Aikatsu Planet! The Movie |
| Incredible Zorori: Lalala A Star Is Born | Takahide Ogata | December 9, 2022 | Tokyo Theaters | Co-produced with Ajiado |
| Aikatsu! x PriPara: The Movie – Miraculous Meeting | Takahiro Okawa | October 10, 2025 | Bandai Namco Pictures; Avex Pictures | |
| Gintama the Movie 2026: Yoshiwara in Flames | Naoya Ando | February 13, 2026 | Warner Bros. Pictures | |
| New Theatrical Movie Keroro Gunsō: Upon Revival, Immediately Facing the Threat of Earth's Destruction! | Fumitoshi Oizaki; Yūichi Fukuda | June 26, 2026 | Kadokawa; Bandai Namco Filmworks | |

=== OVA/ONAs ===
| Title | Director(s) | First run start date | First run end date | Eps. | Notes |
|---|---|---|---|---|---|
| Milpom! (Pilot) | N/A | March 20, 2015 | N/A | 1 | |
| Milpom! | N/A | September 5, 2015 | September 29, 2017 | 6 | |
| Dream Festival! | Yūta Murano | September 23, 2016 | December 16, 2016 | 12 | Co-produced with Ajia-do Animation Works |
| Gintama°: Love Incense Arc | Chizuru Miyawaki; Youichi Fujita | April 8, 2015 | March 30, 2016 | 2 | |
| Dream Festival! R | Yūta Murano | August 23, 2017 | November 8, 2017 | 12 | Co-produced with Ajia-do Animation Works |
| Gintama: Monster Strike-hen | N/A | August 29, 2019 | September 4, 2019 | 2 | |
| Fight League: Gear Gadget Generators | Daisuke Nakajima | February 14, 2019 | August 8, 2019 | 26 | Co-Produced by XFLAG |
| Battle Spirits: Kakumei no Galette | Masaki Watanabe | August 28, 2020 | April 23, 2021 | 5 | |
| Aikatsu on Parade! Dream Story | Shishō Igarashi | March 28, 2020 | July 11, 2020 | 6 | |
| Tiger & Bunny 2 | Mitsuko Kase | April 8, 2022 | October 7, 2022 | 25 | |
