= Magic of Stella =

Japanese manga and anime series

- Cover of the first manga volume

ステラのまほう (Sutera no Mahō)
- Manga
- Written by: Cloba.U
- Published by: Houbunsha
- Magazine: Manga Time Kirara Max
- Original run: October 2012 – February 2022
- Volumes: 10
- Anime television series
- Directed by: Shinya Kawatsura
- Produced by: Hiroyuki Kobayashi; Shousei Itou; Fuminori Yamazaki; Sachi Kawamoto; Noritomo Isogai; Jirou Nakagawa
- Written by: Fumihiko Shimo
- Music by: Rio Kouyama; Mako Kuwahara; Kidlit
- Studio: Silver Link
- Licensed by: NA: Sentai Filmworks
- Original network: AT-X, Tokyo MX, MBS, TVA, BS11
- English network: SEA: Animax Asia
- Original run: October 3, 2016 – December 19, 2016
- Episodes: 12

Magic of Stella (Japanese: ステラのまほう, Hepburn: Sutera no Mahō) is a Japanese 4-panel manga series by cloba.U, serialized in Houbunsha's seinen manga magazine Manga Time Kirara Max from the October 2012 issue to February 2022 issue. It has been collected in ten tankōbon volumes as of December 2021. An anime television series adaptation by Silver Link aired in Japan between October and December 2016.

== Plot ==
Upon enrolling in high school, Tamaki Honda joins a club for making dōjin games known as the SNS Club (short for "Some dead fish eyes Not enough sun Shuttle run Club" (死んだ魚の目日照不足シャトルラン部, Shinda sakana no me Nisshō busoku Shatoru ran-bu). Joined by programmer Shiina, writer Ayame, and composer Kayo, Tamaki begins working as an illustrator for the club's next game.

== Characters ==
Tamaki Honda (本田 珠輝, Honda Tamaki)
Voiced by: Maria Naganawa
The main protagonist, who becomes the illustrator of the SNS Club. As a fan of hard-boiled shōnen manga, her art-style tends to have a focus on gruff-looking men. She is very fond of her father.
Shiina Murakami (村上 椎奈, Murakami Shiina)
Voiced by: Rie Murakawa
The president of the SNS Club who serves as the programmer. She is often soft-spoken and pessimistic.
Ayame Seki (関 あやめ, Seki Ayame)
Voiced by: Ari Ozawa
The scenario writer of the SNS Club. She has a history of writing adult stories under the pen name "Iris" (a translation of her name) that she is somewhat embarrassed about.
Kayo Fujikawa (藤川 歌夜, Fujikawa Kayo)
Voiced by: Aoi Yūki
The composer of the SNS Club. She works part-time as a waitress at a family restaurant.
Yumine Fuda (布田 裕美音, Fuda Yumine)
Voiced by: Ryōko Maekawa
Tamaki's best friend who is a member of the school's Illustration Club. She is a fujoshi who likes to draw boy's love art.
Teru Hyakutake (百武 照, Hyakutake Teru)
Voiced by: Chinatsu Akasaki
Former illustrator and previous president of the SNS Club who is currently in college.
Minaha Iino (飯野 水葉, Iino Minaha)
Voiced by: Ayaka Imamura (anime), Sayaka Kaneko (Kirara Fantasia)
A member of the Illustration Club who starts to help out with the SNS Club's games as a second artist. She admires Iris, but is not convinced that Ayame is really her.
Natsu Iino (飯野 夏, Iino Natsu)
Voiced by: Yō Taichi
Tamaki's classmate and Minaha's older sister.
Haruma Seki (関 春馬, Seki Haruma)
Voiced by: Akira Sekine
Ayame's younger brother.
Marika Shimizu (清水 マリカ, Shimizu Marika)
Voiced by: Shino Shimoji
Tamaki's classmate, who is half-caucasian.

== Media ==
=== Manga ===
No.	Release date	ISBN
1	December 26, 2013	978-4-8322-4388-0
2	December 25, 2014	978-4-8322-4511-2
3	January 27, 2016	978-4-8322-4658-4
4	October 27, 2016	978-4-8322-4757-4
5	December 27, 2016	978-4-8322-4781-9
6	December 27, 2017	978-4-8322-4903-5
7	December 26, 2018	978-4-8322-5000-0
8	December 26, 2019	978-4-8322-7143-2
9	December 25, 2020	978-4-8322-7238-5
10	December 25, 2021	978-4-8322-7334-4

=== Anime ===
An anime television series adaptation by Silver Link aired in Japan between October 3, 2016, and December 19, 2016, and was simulcast by Daisuki and Anime Network. The opening theme is "God Save The Girls" by Shino Shimoji, while the ending theme is "Yonaka Jikaru" (ヨナカジカル, Midnight Radical) by Maria Naganawa and Ryōko Maekawa. The anime was released across four 3 episode Blu-ray & DVD volumes. Sentai Filmworks has licensed the anime in North America.

==== Episodes ====
No.	Title	Original release date
1	"Start Line" "Sutāto Chiten" (スタート地点)	October 3, 2016
Upon entering high school and looking over the different clubs, Tamaki Honda and her friend Yumine Fuda come across the SNS Club, who specialise in making dōjin games. Trying a puzzle game that the club had made, Tamaki hears that the game was mostly the work of an upperclassman who graduated the previous year. While Yumine decides to remain with the Illustration Club, Tamaki, despite hearing how hard game development is, decides to join the SNS Club, becoming its new artist as the group decide to make a visual novel.
2	"Game-Making is Fun!" "Tanoshī Sōsaku" (たのしい創作)	October 10, 2016
Scenario writer Ayame Seki tries to look over Tamaki's sketches, but becomes hesitant to show her old stories. Following a club meeting with president and programmer Shiina Murakami, Tamaki accidentally picks up Ayame's notebook containing an adult scenario she wrote a while back. Anxious about showing off her drawings to her clubmates, Tamaki asks Yumine to show them her notebook in her place, learning that composer Kayo Fujikawa is friends with a boy's love artist she admires. Despite Tamaki having an art style having a hard-boiled shonen look, the girls encourage her to keep drawing art she enjoys, with Yumine offering to help teach her to draw digitally.
3	"Transmitter Item" "Densō Aitemu" (伝送アイテム)	October 17, 2016
During Golden Week, the girls go to Tamaki's home in the countryside to help Ayame finish her scenario for their next game. While Tamaki learns how to use a graphics tablet, Shiina tells her about how their previous president founded the SNS Club. Later that night, Ayame presents her rather unique story draft, which somehow gets approved.
4	"Skill Up" "Sukiru Appu" (スキルアップ)	October 24, 2016
As Tamaki tries to draw different expressions, she receives advice from her classmates Marika Shimizu and Natsu Iino. While still worried, Tamaki receives unexpected encouragement from the club's former president, Teru, who donates some money for the club to buy a scanner for Tamaki. After Tamaki gets soaked in the rain while retrieving her sketchbook, the girls stop by Ayame's house, where Tamaki gets some art advice from Ayame's younger brothers, Haruma and Nobuhito.
5	"Countdown" "Kauntodaun" (カウントダウン)	October 31, 2016
Shiina and Ayame look after Tamaki after she comes down with a cold. After Tamaki recovers, the girls discover that they were unable to enter Summer Comiket, so Ayame signs them up for another event taking place in six days. With a limited amount of time to complete their game, the girls have an overnight session in their club room, during which they become worried about being unable to contact Kayo, only for her to finish her work on time. Thanks to everyone's efforts, the girls complete their game, Magic of Stella, before setting off for the event.
6	"Exhibition Sale" "Sokubai-kai" (そくばいかい)	November 7, 2016
With Shiina coming down with a cold at the last minute, Tamaki and Ayame are left in charge of promoting their game at the event. Initially intimidated by everyone else's artwork, Tamaki perks up when her first customer requests that she draw a sketch for her. Following the event, the girls have a wrap party for their game, where they play the King's game.
7	"First Memory" "Hajimete no Omoide" (はじめての思い出)	November 14, 2016
While trying to come up with lyrics for a song, Kayo asks for help from Tamaki, who assumes she is writing a love poem and starts getting wild ideas. Later, Tamaki recalls how she first became friends with Yumine during elementary school. Wanting to play with Yumine, who didn't have any friends due to her poor health, Tamaki started designing her own board games that they could play together. As a result, Yumine came to smile more and soon became close friends with Tamaki. Back in the present, Tamaki is approached by a strange girl.
8	"Don't Underestimate Debugging?" "Debaggu Nametara Dame da yo?" (デバッグなめたらダメだよ？)	November 21, 2016
Minaha Iino, an artist from the Illustration Club, challenges Tamaki to draw characters from Ayame's novel, ultimately admitting defeat. After playing their game for herself, Minaha comes to the SNS Club to report a bug found in the game, complaining about their lackluster website. While acting cold towards Ayame, unaware that she is actually the writer she admires, Iris, Minaha offers to help spruce up their website, suggesting that Tamaki draw some profile pictures for all the members.
9	"Skill Up 2" "Sukiru Appu Sono 2" (スキルアップその2)	November 28, 2016
As Tamaki finds herself in an art slump, Ayame manages to cheer her up, leaving Shiina uncertain about whether she is doing her job as club president. When Ayame takes off her glasses to do an impression, Minaha starts to see her as Iris and joins the SNS Club as a second artist, with the club now preparing a game for Summer Comiket. Later, after doing some drawing with Marika, Tamaki gets some advice from both Natsu and Minaha on how to improve her drawings. As Tamaki spends the entire night drawing, she forgets to study for a competency test the next day.
10	"Precision Machinery" "Seimitsu Kikai" (精密機械)	December 5, 2016
Tamaki once again comes across Teru, who sneaks into school and gives Tamaki a different hairstyle. Later, after Tamaki argues with Shiina over wanting to improve her art, she panics when she accidentally drops Shiina's laptop, apparently breaking it. While trying to work up the courage to come clean, Tamaki goes over to Shiina's place to apologise, discovering that the laptop had simply ran out of battery. As both Ayame and Minaha show up for an impromptu sleepover session, Shiina recalls a promise she made with Teru.
11	"Having a Problem, Young Lady?" "Okomari desu ka, Ojō-san" (お困りですかお嬢さん)	December 12, 2016
Natsu, revealed to be Minaha's older sister, drags her away for skipping curfew. With Minaha forbidden from participating in club activities under pressure from her family, Tamaki and Ayame decide to go to her house to try and convince Natsu and her grandmother. After a heated discussion over whether drawing is really necessary, Natsu offers to help convince her grandmother on the condition that both Tamaki and Minaha score high enough on their next exams. As Tamaki remains worried over what Natsu said, she receives some encouragement from Teru, who helps her remember why she started drawing in the first place. Later, Minaha goes over to Tamaki's house to work on the game only to realise she won't be able to make it back for her curfew, so she ends up spending the night alongside Teru.
12	"Back to the Starting Line" "Mō Ichido Sutāto Chiten" (もう一度スタート地点)	December 19, 2016
The girls arrive at Summer Comiket to promote their game, with many of their friends showing up as well. Among the customers is the girl who Tamaki met at the previous event. Following the event, the girls go to the beach to celebrate. After watching some kids playing, Tamaki remembers her reason for joining the club and encourages her teammates to create a game based on her idea.

==== OVA episodes ====
No.	Title	Original release date
OVA1	"Kayo's Birthday (First Half)" "Kayo no Tanjōbi (Tochū made)" (歌夜のたんじょうび（とちゅうまで）)	February 24, 2017
Taking place prior to the series, Shiina and Amane come over to Kayo's house to celebrate her birthday, becoming concerned over how she's been acting recently.
OVA2	"Kayo's Birthday (Second Half)" "Kayo no Tanjōbi (Tochū kara)" (歌夜のたんじょうび（とちゅうから）)	March 24, 2017
The girls go out shopping for a birthday present for Kayo, learning that she had been missing Teru. Kayo does however become pleased when Shiina gives her a crane game prize Teru once tried to catch for her.

=== Video games ===
The Flash games made by Cloba.U is published on the site. Characters from the series appear alongside other Manga Time Kirara characters in the 2017 mobile RPG, Kirara Fantasia.

== Reception ==
Anime News Network (ANN) had two editors review the first episode of the anime: Theron Martin praised director Shinya Kawatsura and Silver Link for crafting an adaptation that's simplistically charming with characters that carry surprising depth and gorgeous aesthetics. Nick Creamer, while mixed on the animation quality being "mostly just functional," gave credit to the main cast for feeling grounded while still carrying distinct quirks and was optimistic of the series' progression into the daily activities of the game creation club, concluding that its "unlikely to do much for those who aren't already fans of slice of life, but stands as a charming and solidly written example of its genre. It's not a top tier show, but it's a solid effort." Fellow ANN editor Amy McNulty reviewed the complete anime series in 2017 and gave it an overall B grade. Despite the cast not getting equal development, overused jokes and a lack of insight into the club's creation of the games, McNulty commended the chemistry between them and the light-heartedness of both the comedy and animation, calling it "a show that works both as a binge and an occasional watch to cheer you up on days when you just need something light and cheery."
