= Rin Aira =

Japanese voice actor

- 逢来 りん
- Born: 24 May 2002 (age 24)
- Occupations: Voice actress; singer
- Years active: 2019–present
- Employer: Freelance
- Notable work: Aikatsu Friends! as Wakaba Harukaze; Aikatsu on Parade! as Raki Kiseki; Aikatsu Planet! as Hip Hop Break

Rin Aira (Japanese: 逢来 りん, Hepburn: Aira Rin; born 24 May 2002) is a Japanese voice actress from Hiroshima Prefecture, Who is currently a freelance VA and was previously affiliated with Horipro. She is known for voicing Wakaba Harukaze in Aikatsu Friends!, Raki Kiseki in Aikatsu on Parade!, and Hip Hop Break in Aikatsu Planet!.

== Biography ==
Rin Aira, a native of Hiroshima Prefecture, was born on 24 May 2002. Familiar with games and anime from an early age, she became interested in radio shows and events performed by voice actors after being influenced by voice actress Miyu Matsuki. Eventually, she would decide to become a voice actress and participating in various auditions.

In 2018, Aira was selected as the grand prize winner in the Miracle Seiyū Audition for Aikatsu Friends!, in 2019, she made her voice acting debut in the series as Wakaba Harukaze. Prior to her debut, she had no acting experience, and she decided to use a recording website to try voice acting. She also performs as a singer as a member of Best Friends!, a unit assembled for the series. In August 2019, she was cast as Raki Kiseki, the main character of Aikatsu Friends!'s spinoff Aikatsu on Parade!. In November 2020, she was cast as Hip Hop Break in the next Aikatsu series, Aikatsu Planet!.

In February 2020, she was cast as Nioi-san in Poccolies. In March 2020, she was cast as Haru in Mitchiri Wanko! Animation. In October 2020, she was cast as Anna in Kaoru no Taisetsu na Mono. In November 2020, she was cast as Haruko in Tokyo Gambo. In October 2022, she was cast as Fumi in Guardy Girls.

In 2021, she won the Seiyu Award for Best Rookie Actress at the 15th Seiyu Awards. After Aira began taking a career hiatus in December 2022 due to health problems, on 18 January 2023, Horipro announced that this hiatus would be indefinite due to her recovery. On December 31st 2024, Rin Announced on Social Media that she is resuming her VO activities however as a freelance VO, as she further announced that she left her agency

== Filmography ==
=== Anime television ===
2019

- Aikatsu Friends!, Wakaba Harukaze
- Aikatsu on Parade!, Raki Kiseki

2020

- Kaoru no Taisetsu na Mono, Anna
- Mitchiri Wanko! Animation, Haru
- Poccolies, Nioi-san
- Tokyo Gambo, Haruko

2021

- Aikatsu Planet!, Hip Hop Break

=== Animated film ===
- Guardy Girls (2022), Fumi

== Awards ==
Year	Award	Result	Ref.
2021	Seiyu Award for Best Rookie Actress	Won	
