= Shino Shimoji =

Japanese voice actress

- 下地 紫野
- Born: June 4, 1993 (age 33); Okinawa, Japan
- Occupations: Voice actress; singer
- Years active: 2011–present
- Agent: Aoni Production
- Height: 146 cm (4 ft 9 in)

Shino Shimoji (下地 紫野, Shimoji Shino; born June 4, 1993) is a Japanese voice actress and singer from Okinawa Prefecture, affiliated with Aoni Production. She debuted as a singer in 2016 by performing the opening theme song for Magic of Stella.

== Filmography ==
=== Anime television ===
- Abarenbō Rikishi!! Matsutarō (2014), Yuri
- Aikatsu! (2014), Akari Ōzora (speaking voice)
- Samurai Warriors (2015), Suzu
- The Idolmaster Cinderella Girls (2015), Yuka Nakano
- Magic of Stella (2016), Marika Shimizu
- Aikatsu Stars! (2017), Akari Ōzora
- Battle Girl High School (2017), Shiho Kunieda
- Kemono Friends (2017), American Beaver
- Restaurant to Another World (2017), Renner
- Seiren (2017), Tōru Miyamae
- Beatless (2018), Saturnus
- Hakumei and Mikochi (2018), Mikochi
- Tada Never Falls in Love (2018), Alexandra Magritte
- Super Dragon Ball Heroes (2019), Lagss
- Boogiepop and Others (2019), Kei Niitoki
- Aikatsu on Parade! (2019), Akari Ōzora
- Shadows House (2021), Shirley/Ram
- The Case Study of Vanitas (2021), Lucius "Luca" Oriflamme
- Selection Project (2021), Mako Toma
- The World's Finest Assassin Gets Reincarnated in Another World as an Aristocrat (2021), Maha
- Rumble Garanndoll (2021), Yakumo Kamizuru
- Legend of Mana: The Teardrop Crystal (2022), Corona/Lisa
- Farming Life in Another World (2023), Ru Rurushi
- The Girl I Like Forgot Her Glasses (2023), Narumi Someya
- Shy (2023), Teru Momijiyama/Shy
- The Ossan Newbie Adventurer (2024), Angelica Diarmuit
- Okitsura (2025), Yae Agena
- Digimon Beatbreak (2025), Lilamon
- Mao (2026), Kagari Hosho
- Young Ladies Don't Play Fighting Games (2026), Tamaki Ichinose

=== Anime films ===
- Girls und Panzer der Film (2015), Aki
- Non Non Biyori Vacation (2018), Aoi Nizato
- The Seven Deadly Sins: Grudge of Edinburgh (2022), Kurumiru

=== Video games ===
- The Idolmaster Cinderella Girls: Starlight Stage (2015), Yuka Nakano
- Ys VIII: Lacrimosa of Dana (2016), Quina
- Xenoblade Chronicles 2 (2017), Pyra and Mythra
- Fire Emblem Heroes (2017), Ash
- Dynasty Warriors 9 (2018), Xin Xianying
- Valkyria Chronicles 4 (2018), Ruch
- Xenoblade Chronicles 2: Torna – The Golden Country (2018), Mythra
- GOD EATER 3 (2018), Female Custom Voice #7
- Master of Eternity (2018), Kana
- Azur Lane (2019), USS Georgia
- Arknights (2019), Myrtle
- Umamusume: Pretty Derby (2021), Nakayama Festa
- Tales of Arise (2021), Shionne
- Super Smash Bros. Ultimate (2021), Pyra and Mythra
- Tsukihime -A piece of blue glass moon- (2021), Akiha Tohno
- Melty Blood: Type Lumina (2021), Akiha Tohno
- Counter:Side (2021), Xiao Lin
- Digimon Survive (2022), Floramon
- Dead or Alive Xtreme Venus Vacation (2022), Shandy
- Xenoblade Chronicles 3: Future Redeemed (2023), Glimmer
- World Dai Star: Yume no Stellarium (2023), Hikari Yonaguni
- Genshin Impact (2023), Chevreuse
- Groove Coaster Future Performers (2025), Angelica Wiseman
- Azur Lane (2026), Shandy

=== Dubbing ===
==== Live-action ====
- A Dog's Journey, Young CJ
- Pet Sematary, Ellie Creed

==== Animation ====
- The Addams Family 2, Peggy

== Discography ==
=== Singles ===
| Release date | Title | Catalog No. | Notes |
|---|---|---|---|
| October 26, 2016 | "God Save The Girls" | VTZL-123 (Limited edition) VTCL-35241 (Regular edition) | Opening theme song of Magic of Stella |
| August 1, 2018 | "Sonnano Boku Ja Nai" (そんなの僕じゃない。, I'm Not That Kind of Person) | VTZL-150 (Limited edition) VTCL-35280 (Regular edition) | Ending theme song of Miss Caretaker of Sunohara-sou |
