= Data Carddass =

Japanese video game series

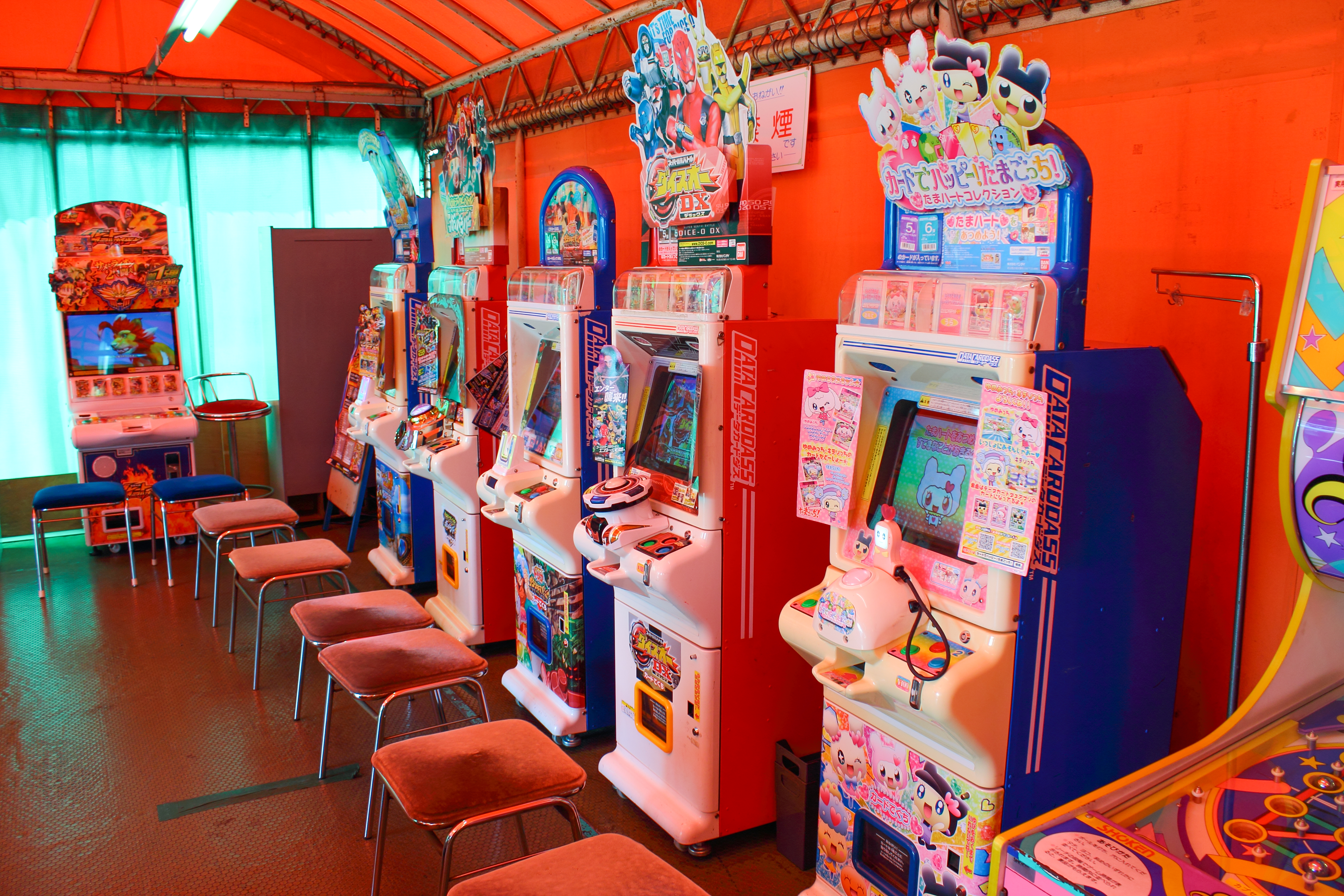
Bandai carddass machines

Data Carddass (データカードダス, Dēta Kādodasu) is a series of Japanese arcade game machines created by Bandai, which largely focus around the digital use of collectible trading cards. It is an expansion of Bandai's Carddass collectible trading card series, which allows players to use special cards to interact with arcade video games. Many of these machines revolve around various anime and tokusatsu franchises owned by Bandai. The machines first began release in Japanese arcades from March 2005.

Bandai had sold 100,000 Data Carddass arcade machines by March 2012. For use with the machines, over 2.4 billion Data Cardass cards had been sold by 2017, increasing to 2.749 billion Data Carddass cards sold as of March 2021.

== Overview ==
Data Carddass make use of special Carddass cards with data stored on them. These collectible cards can be read by various Data Carddass machines in order to interact with the game. For example, in Aikatsu!, a game revolving around fashion, players can scan cards featuring various clothes to make their character wear them. Depending on the machine, cards can either be inserted via a slot or scanned via a flat panel. Each machine is also fitted with various controls unique to their specific minigames, such as buttons which require timed presses or touches. Performing well in these games can also grant additional cards. Select machines utilise IC cards, which allow frequent players to save personal data from the games. Certain machines can also scan collectible toys to affect the gameplay.

== Series ==
These machines are periodically updated as new elements are added in their respective franchises.

=== Ongoing series ===
Official IC Card Support type

- Great Animal Kaiser July 2012～
- Daikaijuu Rush ULTRA FRONTIER September 2013～

No IC Card Support type

- Ultraman Fusion Fight! 2018 (Chinese version )
- Ultraman Fusion Fight! 2019 (Southeast Asia version)

=== Retired series ===
- Kamen Rider Ganbarizing
- Ultraman Fusion Fight! (Japanese version)
- Hyakujuu Taisen Animal Kaiser
- Dragon Ball series
  - Data Carddass: Dragon Ball Z
  - Data Carddass: Dragon Ball Z 2
  - Dragon Ball Z: Bakuretsu Impact
  - Dragon Ball Z: W Bakuretsu Impact
  - Dragon Ball Kai Dragon Battlers
- Naruto series
  - Naruto Narultimate Card Battle
  - Naruto Shippuden: Kyuukyoku Ninmu Narultimate Mission
  - Naruto Shippuden: Narultimate Cross
- Digimon series
  - Kyuukyoku Taisen! Digimon Battle Terminal
  - Kyuukyoku Taisen! Digimon Battle Terminal 02
  - Digimon Xros Wars Chou Digicard Taisen
  - Digimon Xros Wars Chou Digicard Taisen: General Strikers
- Tamagotchi series
  - Chou Nenju Kaisai Card de Ouen! Tamagotchi Cup
  - All Seasons Saa Ikou! Card de Entry! Tamagotchi Contest
  - Tamagotchi Fushigi na Ehon
  - Card de Dechakushin! Tamagotchi!
  - Card de Happy! Tamagotchi! Tama Heart Collection
- Daikaijuu Battle series:
  - Daikaijuu Battle Ultra Monsters
  - Daikaijuu Battle Ultra Monsters Ex
  - Daikaijuu Battle Ultra Monsters Neo
  - Daikaijuu Battle Ultra Monster Neo: Galaxy Legend
  - Daikaijuu Battle RR
- Pretty Cure series
  - Utatte! Pretty Cure Dream Live ~Speech Card de Metamorphose!?
  - Pretty Cure All Stars: GoGo Dream Live
  - Pretty Cure All Stars: Fresh Dream Dance
  - Pretty Cure All Stars: HeartCatch Dream Dance
  - Pretty Cure Princess Party April 2015～
- One Piece series
  - One Piece Berry Match
  - One Piece Berry Match Double
  - One Piece Berry Match Icy
- Super Sentai series
  - Super Sentai Battle Dice-O
- Power Rangers series
  - Power Rangers Card Battle
- Aikatsu! series
  - Data Carddass Aikatsu!
  - Aikatsu Stars!
  - Aikatsu Stars! Wings of Stars
  - Aikatsu Friends!
  - Aikatsu Friends! Brilliant Jewel
  - Aikatsu on Parade!
  - Aikatsu on Parade! Dream Story
  - Aikatsu Planet!
  - Aikatsu Planet! Unit Stage
