= Aikatsu Friends! =

Japanese arcade game franchise

- Anime key visual

アイカツフレンズ！ (Aikatsu Furenzu!)
- Genre: Musical
- Created by: BN Pictures (story); Bandai (concept)
- Manga
- Written by: Chihiro Komori
- Published by: Shogakukan
- Magazine: Ciao
- Original run: April 5, 2018 – September 26, 2019
- Anime television series
- Directed by: Shishō Igarashi
- Written by: Yūko Kakihara
- Music by: Digz Motion Sounds
- Studio: BN Pictures
- Licensed by: SA / SEA: Muse Communication
- Original network: TXN (TV Tokyo), BS TV Tokyo, AT-X
- Original run: April 5, 2018 – September 26, 2019
- Episodes: 76
- Video games
- Aikatsu Friends! (Data Carddass, 2018); Aikatsu Friends! Brilliant Jewel (Data Carddass, 2019)
- Other series
- Aikatsu! (2012); Aikatsu Stars! (2016); Aikatsu Friends! (2018); Aikatsu on Parade! (2019); Aikatsu Planet! (2021); Aikatsu Academy! (2024)
- icon

Aikatsu Friends! (アイカツフレンズ！, Aikatsu Furenzu!) is an arcade collectible card game in Bandai's Data Carddass line of machines, which launched in April 2018. It is the successor to the Aikatsu Stars! series of arcade games. The game revolves around using collectible cards featuring various clothes to help aspiring idols pass auditions.

An anime television adaptation by BN Pictures aired from April 5, 2018, to September 26, 2019, replacing the Aikatsu Stars! series. A manga adaptation by Chihiro Komori began serialization in Shogakukan's shōjo manga magazine Ciao from April 3, 2018. On October 5, 2019, the series was followed by a spin-off titled Aikatsu on Parade!.

== Plot ==
Aine Yūki, an ordinary student at Star Harmony Academy's normal division, meets Mio Minato from the idol division, who invites her to fulfill her goal of making friends. Joined by other idols, including Maika Chōno and Ema Hinata, Aine and Mio form a pair of best friends to become the bright Diamond Friends.

== Characters ==
Aine Yūki (友希 あいね, Yūki Aine)
Voiced by: Akane Matsunaga
Aine is a first year high school student who belongs to Star Harmony Academy's idol division. A bright and positive girl with a kind heart, making friends is her specialty.
Mio Minato (湊 みお, Minato Mio)
Voiced by: Ibuki Kido
Mio is a first year high school in Star Harmony Academy's idol division. With her extraordinary fashion sense, she serves as both the designer and muse of her own brand, Material Color.
Maika Chōno (蝶乃 舞花, Chōno Maika)
Voiced by: Karen Miyama
Maika is a first year high school student who belongs to Star Harmony Academy's idol division. A passionate girl who loves festivals, she has good reflexes and also enjoys popularity as a model.
Ema Hinata (日向 エマ, Hinata Ema)
Voiced by: Yui Ninomiya
Ema is a second year high school student who belongs to Star Harmony Academy's idol division. Being one year older than the other idols, she serves a reliable big sister figure to them.
Karen Kamishiro (神城 カレン, Kamishiro Karen)
Voiced by: Azusa Tadokoro
Born into the rich Kamishiro family, Karen received special education from a young age. Attentive and always smiling, she is an idol overflowing.
Mirai Asuka (明日香 ミライ, Asuka Mirai)
Voiced by: Ayaka Ōhashi
Mirai is a fashion leader with a love for things that are "cunique" and often takes pictures and uploads them on Friendstagram.
Sakuya Shirayuri (白百合 さくや, Shirayuri Sakuya)
Voiced by: Emiri Suyama
Sakuya is one of the first year high school students who belongs to Star Harmony Academy. She is an easygoing girl constantly spoiled by Kaguya, who often deals with her personal matters.
Kaguya Shirayuri (白百合 かぐや, Shirayuri Kaguya)
Voiced by: Yūki Kuwahara
Kaguya is one of the first year high school students who belongs to Star Harmony Academy. She formed the Friends Reflect Moon with her older twin sister, Sakuya.
Wakaba Harukaze (春風 わかば, Harukaze Wakaba)
Voiced by: Rin Aira
Mirai's "hidden child" the winner of "Mirai's Miracle Audition", Wakaba aspires to be an idol like Pure Palette. Her cute voice and sponge-like ability to take in new things are of note.
Hibiki Tenshō (天翔 ひびき, Tenshō Hibiki)
Voiced by: Yōko Hikasa
Hibiki is an Aikatsu! artist who suddenly appears before the other idols. Charismatic and mature, she has a rivalry with Love Me Tear and competes with them whenever they meet.
Alicia Charlotte (アリシアシャーロット, Arishia Shārotto)
Voiced by: Saori Ōnishi
Alicia is princess of Solvette with whom Hibiki formed Friends with. A kindhearted girl with a distinctive atmosphere, she captivates people who see her.

== Media ==
An anime television series produced by BN Pictures began airing on TV Tokyo on April 5, 2018, succeeding the Aikatsu Stars! anime series in its initial time-slot. A second season, subtitled Aikatsu Friends! Kagayaki no Jewel, aired from April 4 to September 26, 2019.
