= Dream Festival! =

Japanese game and original net animation franchise

ドリフェス！ (Dorifesu!)
- Genre: Musical
- Created by: BN Pictures
- Anime television series
- Directed by: Yūta Murano
- Written by: Yoichi Katō
- Music by: Ryō Takahashi; Ken Itō
- Studio: BN Pictures
- Original network: Tokyo MX, BS11, Sun TV, TV Aichi, AT-X
- Original run: October 7, 2016 – December 23, 2017
- Episodes: 24
- Video game
- Publisher: Bandai Namco Games
- Genre: Rhythm game
- Platform: iOS, Android
- Released: April 2016

Dream Festival! (ドリフェス！, Dorifesu!) is a video game and ONA franchise produced by Bandai Namco Group and Amuse. The premise of the project follows five aspiring male idols at a fictional talent agency. A two-season anime television adaptation by BN Pictures began airing on TV Tokyo from October 2016 to December 2017.

== Plot ==
Kanade Amamiya is a high school student who has worked part-time ever since he quit the soccer team. One day, Kanade is scouted by a famous idol producer. Kanade is not sure he wants to be an idol, and his new rival Junya Sasaki tells him that he does not have what it takes. After running through a rigorous day of idol exercises, Kanade realizes this just might be the passion he has been looking for.

== Characters ==
=== DearDream ===
Kanade Amamiya (天宮 奏, Amamiya Kanade)
Voiced by: Sōma Ishihara
Shin Oikawa (及川 慎, Oikawa Shin)
Voiced by: Takuya Mizoguchi
Junya Sasaki (佐々木 純哉, Sasaki Junya)
Voiced by: Kentarō Tomita
Itsuki Katagiri (片桐 いつき, Katagiri Itsuki)
Voiced by: Masaki Ōta
Chizuru Sawamura (沢村 千弦, Sawamura Chizuru)
Voiced by: Masaki Kaoru

=== Kurofune ===
Keigo Kazama (風間 圭吾, Kazama Keigo)
Voiced by: Kimito Totani
Yuto Kuroishi (黒石 勇人, Kuroishi Yuto)
Voiced by: Hideaki Kabumoto

== Media ==
The Dream Festival! arcade game from Bandai began appearing in Japanese arcades from October 2012 as part of its Data Carddass line. A Mobile game, Dream Festival R, was released for the iOS and Android on May 25, 2016, and ended service on May 1, 2018.

An anime television series produced by Bandai Namco Pictures began airing on Tokyo MX from October to December 2016. A second season, titled Dream Festival! R, began airing from October to December 2017. Animate TV and Crunchyroll began streaming the series from September 23, 2016.
