= Collei =

Video game character

- Genshin Impact character
- Official artwork
- First appearance: Genshin Impact manhua, chapter 8: "Final Clue" (2019)
- First game: Genshin Impact (2022)
- Voiced by: EN: Christina Costello; ZH: Qin Wenjing; JA: Ryoko Maekawa; KO: Bang Siu

In-universe information
- Weapon: Bow
- Home: Sumeru
- Element: Dendro

Collei (/ˈkɒleɪ/ KOL-ay; Chinese: 柯萊; pinyin: Kēlái) is a character from the video game Genshin Impact, developed by miHoYo. She is a trainee Forest Ranger from the fictional nation of Sumeru. She first appeared in the Genshin Impact prequel manhua, which began serialization in 2018, where she served as its protagonist. At the time, she was portrayed as a frail young girl wrapped in bandages, with a pessimistic and serious personality.

In July 2022, miHoYo officially revealed Collei's in-game character artwork and profile, and she was added as a playable four-star Dendro character in version 3.0 of the game the next month. In the game, Collei shows significant growth in both appearance and personality, becoming more confident. Her accessories and skill design also incorporate elements associated with Amber, one of her friends from the manhua. Collei's backstory involves illness, trauma, and personal growth. Her role in the story and character design have attracted player attention and positive commentary from critics, and she has also been regarded as an important vehicle for the game's long-term narrative foreshadowing.

== Design and voice acting ==
In the Genshin Impact manhua, Collei is shown as a frail girl with short emerald-green hair, her body covered in bandages. Because of her past experiences, she is pessimistic and suspicious of others. Her in-game appearance changed significantly: she has grown taller, her hair is longer, and she is more confident. She has also obtained a Dendro Vision. (Note: A Vision is a magical device used to manipulate the elements.) In addition, because Collei and Amber are established as friends in the manhua, the accessories Collei wears on her body as well as her skill design incorporate elements based on the latter. For example, Collei has a ribbon ornament similar in style to the bow Amber wears on her head, and the effects of her character skills resemble Amber's.

Collei is voiced in English by Christina Costello. During the audition process, the production team asked Costello to try to convey the feeling of a character suffering through illness. Costello, who has health conditions in real life, fulfilled this request; after learning about Costello's situation, the team believed she was capable of performing the role. She is voiced in Japanese by Ryoko Maekawa, who shared that before recording, the production team reminded her to read the manhua to understand the character, and also emphasized that she should occasionally reveal Collei's introverted and gloomy side when portraying her. The recording process for Collei went through several rounds, and before each round Maekawa was able to sense clear growth in Collei. Because she and Amber are close friends in the game, Maekawa deliberately researched Amber before recording. In the Windblume Festival event scene where the two meet up, she intentionally portrayed Collei as blushing, shy, and speaking more quickly, based on her own understanding of the character. Collei is voiced in Chinese by Qin Wenjing, and in Korean by Bang Siu.

== Appearances ==
Collei is the protagonist of the Genshin Impact prequel manhua. Born in Sumeru, Collei suffered from a terminal illness known as Eleazar when she was young. Her mother sent her to an aid organization that claimed to help the infected, but in reality the organization had been established by the Fatui for human experimentation. Through these experiments, Collei gained the ability to control black flames, but her body was also tormented by this power. She escaped and began to wander, waiting for an opportunity to take revenge on the Fatui. While passing through Mondstadt, she was warmly received by Amber, a member of the Knights of Favonius, and the two became friends. After Lisa Minci, an academic, heard about her situation, she asked Cyno, who is also from Sumeru, for help. He successfully sealed Collei's black-flame ability, and Collei then returned to Sumeru with him for treatment. After arriving there, she became the apprentice of Tighnari, a local Forest Ranger who treated her and trained her to be a Forest Ranger. Eleazar, which was part of the pollution of Irminsul, Teyvat's world tree, would only disappear after the game's protagonist, the Traveler, worked together with Nahida to resolve the issue.

In the storyline of the in-game event known as the Windblume Festival, Collei returns to Mondstadt accompanied by Tighnari and Cyno to reveal to the locals that her Eleazar had been cured. She finds a note inside a book stating that whoever completes four tasks will receive a blessing. Sucrose, a local researcher who is also socially anxious, approaches her, and the two try to figure out the note's meaning. The note contains four riddles, each of which corresponds to one person. After Amber appears, Collei recounts how she was once helped by the people of Mondstadt. She then goes to the city gate to welcome Tighnari and Cyno, and meets Sucrose's teacher, Albedo. Sucrose mentions afterward that Collei seems depressed and decides to help her solve the note's riddle. Later, Amber brings Eula along and they join Collei for an outing. Sucrose suggests they look for people matching the descriptions provided by the note and ask them for advice, setting up a mailbox to collect messages. Collei tells Sucrose about her gratitude toward Amber and the painful events of her past, deepening the bond between the two. After returning to Albedo's alchemy workshop, everyone organizes the messages and identifies the four individuals as Albedo, astrologist Mona Megistus, adventurer Klee, and alchemist Timaeus. They then travel to a floating island where they were supposed to receive their blessing, only to discover that the prophecy contained within the note has no correct answer. They contact Alice, a powerful witch who is Klee's mother, and learn that the note was originally a letter of blessing written for one of the Hexenzirkel witches before her marriage. Although no actual blessing is given to the group, Collei and Sucrose gain a precious friendship.

Later, after the Traveler concludes their journey in Nod-Krai, they receive a letter from Collei. One day, Collei dreamed that all of her friends had switched roles with one another. After waking up and realizing it was a nightmare, she is contacted telepathically by Nicole Reeyn, another powerful Hexenzirkel member, who tells her to report the vision she saw to Nahida and the Traveler. The vision stems from the god remains within her body and serves as a warning of the threat posed by Dottore (an antagonistic Fatui Harbinger) against Irminsul. Collei tells the Traveler about the vision. Nahida investigates further but cannot find anything, instead ordering an evacuation. After the people of Sumeru relocate to the desert, they are attacked by jinn. Collei, Tighnari and Dori hold off the first wave of attacks, and at a moment of despair, Nicole instructs Collei to recite a magical prayer, forcing the jinn to retreat. Collei later meets Nicole in person and learns the truth: the remains within her body are actually fragments of the Goddess of Flowers. This worries Collei at first, but Cyno reassures her that no matter what exists within her body, she is still Collei. Collei helps Nahida overload Irminsul and provides technical support for Dori. After the incident, Collei formally graduates and becomes a full-fledged Forest Ranger. She then travels to Mondstadt with Cyno and Tighnari, where Nicole invites her to meet Liloupar, a jinn, at Windrise in Mondstadt. Liloupar offers to absorb the god remains inside Collei's body. Collei agrees, and Liloupar completes the process before peacefully fading away. Amber then appears, and Collei says that they are saying goodbye to their "past selves".

=== Gameplay ===
After the release of Genshin Impact version 3.0, players could obtain Collei through the game's Wish system and add her to their party. She was the first four-star Dendro character. Players could also directly invite Collei to join their party by meeting certain conditions in a limited-time event which launched during the same period.

Collei uses a bow as a weapon. Her Normal Attack has two forms: one is a series of quick, low-damage shots, while the other is a charged shot which deals Dendro damage. Her Elemental Skill has her throw a boomerang imbued with Dendro. Her Elemental Burst has her throw out a doll named Culein-Anbar, which automatically attacks enemies within its range.

== Promotion ==
Collei first appeared in the Genshin Impact prequel manhua, which began serialization in 2018, though she did not appear until 2019. On July 10, 2022, miHoYo first released Collei's character artwork and profile on their social media. She became playable in version 3.0, "The Morn a Thousand Roses Brings", released in August 2022. That same month, miHoYo released a trailer showing her abilities in combat.

In May 2023, Genshin Impact launched a collaboration with American cosmetic retailer Kiehl's, with Collei and Tighnari serving as the representative characters. Writer Chaguan Xiao'er of Chinese gaming site Game Teahouse argued that Collei and Tighnari were picked as the representative characters because both are Forest Rangers in the game, responsible for protecting forests, fighting pollution, and helping others. This setting closely matched the environmental purpose of the charity event and also echoes Kiehl's advocacy for environmental sustainability.

Chaguan Xiao'er said that as early as the version 3.0 update, the game had already guided players through storylines about protecting nature. When players had the opportunity to revisit those memories through an offline collaboration, they were more likely to feel resonance and be motivated to take action. They also mentioned the player community's spontaneous response: some players cosplayed as Collei and other characters while visiting offline stores to check in and participate in the recycling effort; others, due to a lack of Kiehl's stores in their area, spontaneously set up charity flower stalls, cosplaying as Collei and giving out dried flowers, thereby continuing the game's ecological-protection behavior in real life. Chaguan Xiao'er argued that these actions not only demonstrated the positive influence of Collei's character image, but also showed that Genshin Impact had successfully encouraged players to extend the game's values into real life through its character settings and story buildup.

== Reception ==
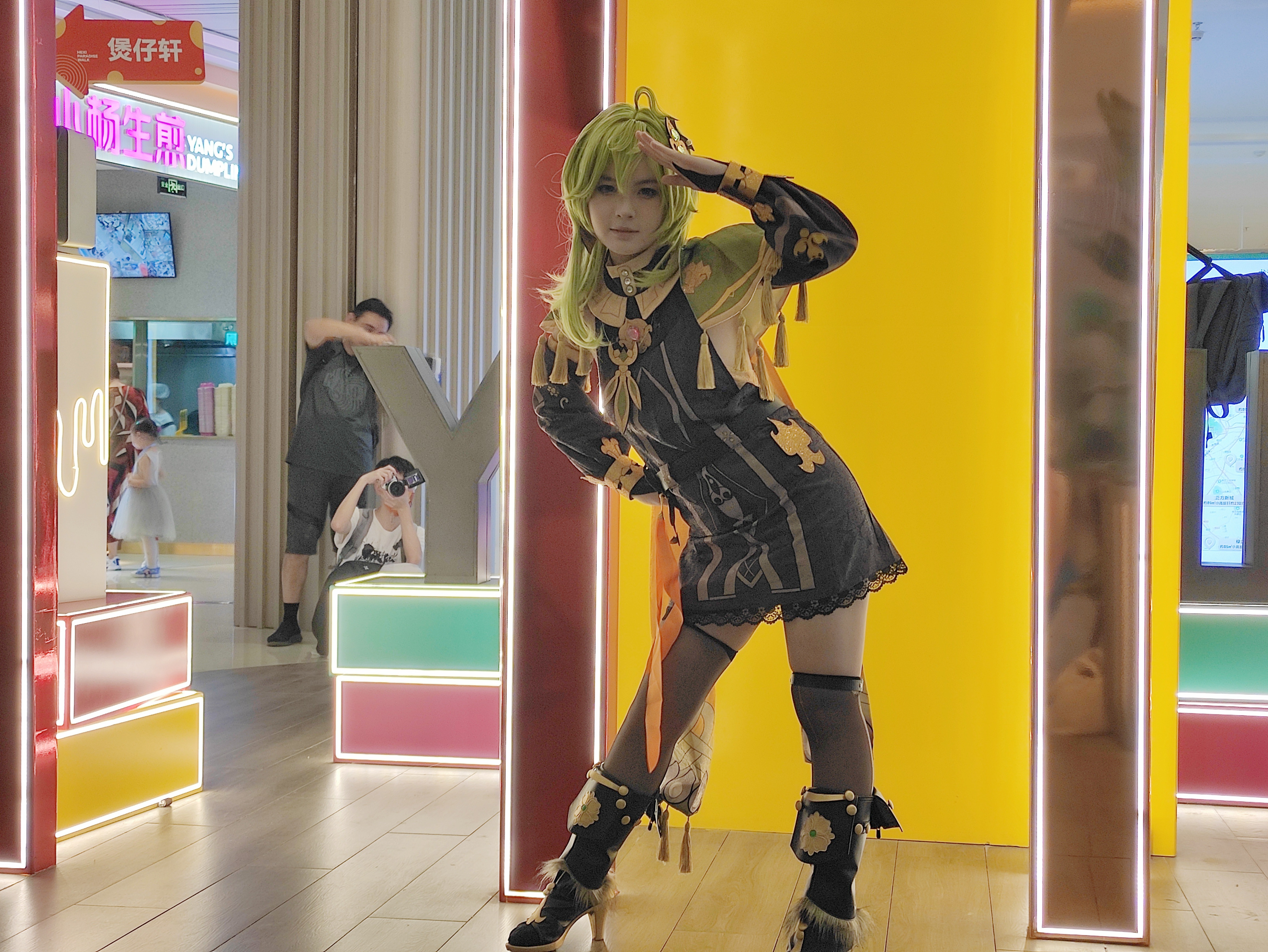
Cosplay of Collei

As the manhua's protagonist, Collei had already attracted attention from players before she was officially added to the game. Some players and commentators also looked forward to the day she would become playable in the future. Some expressed their fondness for Collei via cosplay.

Collei's role in the Windblume Festival event storyline also attracted critical attention. Jude Calvar Infante of Game Rant considered the relationship between Collei and Sucrose to be one of the storyline's highlights. Through their interactions, the game directly addresses issues of mental health and social anxiety. Collei had endured tragedy since childhood and suffered from Dottore's experiments; although her Eleazar had been cured, her inner trauma continued to trouble her. In the storyline, Collei confides in Sucrose about her admiration for Amber and her feelings of self-denial, even wishing that she had a better personality. Sucrose responds with understanding, compassion and companionship, telling Collei that she does not need to be perfect and should also learn to relax when needed. The article argued that this relationship was designed to encourage players facing similar struggles to find friends who were willing to listen and understand them, and that even strangers can bring warmth.

Stephanie Liu of Siliconera argued that the Windblume Festival storyline brought Collei's personal story to a satisfying close. The storyline centers on Collei's effort to become the person she ideally wants to be, while her social anxiety and self-doubt feel very true to life. Liu found it unfortunate that Collei and Amber did not interact much directly in the storyline, but still felt that Collei's growth was heartening: she is no longer simply imitating Amber, but has developed into her own person and resolved to help others just as others had helped her. Liu especially praised the scene in which Collei and Sucrose speak one-on-one; with less intervention from the Traveler and Paimon, the interaction between the two felt more natural and sincere.

Collei has also been regarded as a key vehicle for the game's long-term narrative foreshadowing. Qiuqiu of Game Grape said that in the Archon Quest for version "Luna VII", Collei once again uses a nightmare to foreshadow the crisis of Dottore contaminating Irminsul, formally paying off the image from a promotional video released four years earlier, in which she dreams of the tree being burned. The god remains left in her body resonate with Irminsul, explaining why she is the first to foresee the disaster, and this once-suspended plot point is successfully resolved. In the storyline, Collei is also formally promoted from trainee to full Forest Ranger, demonstrating her growth and maturity. Qiuqiu argued that Collei represents an emotional connection for ordinary players: even those who do not understand the deeper foreshadowing can still be moved by her appearance and growth.

Xunyang of GameRes noted that part of Collei's storyline begins with a dream and ends with her saying farewell. At the end of the quest, she removes the remnants of the Goddess of Flowers from her body, saying goodbye to the weak, pain-ridden version of herself from the past and arriving at an ordinary but brand-new starting point. Many players were moved by this and sincerely felt joy at her growth. Xunyang argued that this not only echoed the theme of growth, but also reflects the core of Genshin Impact's worldview: the possibility of growth. People are imperfect and make mistakes, but it is precisely this ongoing process of trials that demonstrates the value of human rule.

Because Collei's skills share many similarities with Amber's in terms of gameplay, she has been nicknamed "the Dendro Amber". As one of the first Dendro characters added to the game, Collei's element makes her suitable for forming teams with many different characters. Nahda Nabiilah of Game Rant argued that Collei has excellent Dendro application, allowing her to consistently apply Dendro to enemies and making her highly suitable for triggering different elemental reactions. She excels at off-field damage and support, and her gameplay is intuitive and simple. However, Nabiilah considered Collei unsuitable as a main DPS, as her damage depends heavily on elemental reactions and falls off sharply without them, and she is highly reliant on her Elemental Burst, meaning she needs a large amount of Energy Recharge to function.
