= Aikatsu Planet! The Movie =

2022 film by Ryuichi Kimura

- Theatrical release poster
- Japanese: 劇場版 アイカツプラネット！
- Revised Hepburn: Gekijōban Aikatsu Puranetto!
- Directed by: Ryuichi Kimura
- Screenplay by: Misuzu Chiba
- Based on: Aikatsu Planet! by BN Pictures and Bandai
- Starring: Kāya Date; Rio Ogura; Rion Watanabe; Shizune Nagao; Amy; Mizuki; Narumi Uno; Rurika Uno
- Music by: Cher Watanabe; Takamitsu Ono; Kei Tsuda
- Production company: BN Pictures
- Distributed by: BN Pictures
- Release date: July 15, 2022
- Running time: 43 minutes
- Country: Japan
- Language: Japanese

Aikatsu Planet! The Movie (Japanese: 劇場版 アイカツプラネット！, Hepburn: Gekijōban Aikatsu Puranetto!) is a 2022 Japanese tokusatsu/animated musical dance film directed by Ryuichi Kimura and written by Misuzu Chiba; the film is based on a television series with a same name by BN Pictures and Bandai, who the former also produced and distributed the film. The film stars Kāya Date, Rio Ogura, Rion Watanabe, Shizune Nagao, Amy, Mizuki, Narumi Uno, and Rurika Uno. It was released in Japan on July 15, 2022, as a double feature with a 25-minute short, Aikatsu! 10th Story: Starway to the Future.

== Synopsis ==
A few months after the Planet Princess Grand Prix, Mao's schedule is packed. To show her gratitude to her fans, she launches "Aikatsu Planet! Gratitude Festival".

== Cast ==
- Kāya Date as Mao Otoha
- Rio Ogura as Rui Tamaki
- Shizune Nagao as Kiyoko Umekoji
- Rion Watanabe as Shiori Motoya
- Mizuki as Ayumi Tsukishiro
- Amy as Ann Kirimm
- Narumo Uno as Meisa Hinata
- Rurika Uno as Sara Itoi
- Sayaka Akimoto as Izumi Watanuki
- Shimba Tsuchiya as Itsuki Segawa
- Kaito Irie as Keito Kirihata
- Makoto Yamashita as Shō Kurosaki
- Sumire Hanaoka as Ryōka Kurosaki

Voice cast

- Mitsuki Saiga as Aurora Pegasus
- Kaya Matsutani as Mystical Ceryneia

== Production ==
In October 2021, it was announced on Sunrise Festival Regeneration 2021 that Aikatsu Planet! tokusatsu/animated television series will receive a film adaptation, with director Ryuichi Kimura, and screenwriter Misuzu Chiba returning from the television series for the film. In April 2021, the official website revealed that animation character designer Risa Miyadani will return for the film.

== Release ==
The film was released in theaters in Japan on July 15, 2022, as a double feature with 25-minute short, Aikatsu! 10th Story: Starway to the Future.

== Reception ==
=== Box office ===
The film failed to make it to the top 10 in the Japanese box office.
