= Aikatsu Planet! =

Japanese media franchise

- Key visual featuring Mao Otoha and her avatar idol, Hana
- Genre: Tokusatsu; Anime; Idol; Music
- Created by: BN Pictures (story); Bandai (concept)
- Written by: Misuzu Chiba
- Directed by: Ryūichi Kimura
- Starring: Kāya Date; Rio Ogura; Shizune Nagao; Rion Watanabe; Mizuki; Amy; Narumi Uno; Rurika Uno
- Opening theme: Bloomy＊Smile
- Ending theme: Glittering☆Party♪ Time
- Composers: Cher Watanabe; Takamitsu Ono; Kei Tsuda
- Country of origin: Japan
- Original language: Japanese
- No. of seasons: 1
- No. of episodes: 25

Production
- Running time: 24–25 minutes
- Production companies: TV Tokyo; Dentsu; BN Pictures

Original release
- Network: TXN (TV Tokyo)
- Release: January 10 – June 27, 2021

Aikatsu Planet! (Japanese: アイカツプラネット！, Hepburn: Aikatsu Puranetto!) is an arcade collectible card game in Bandai's Data Carddass line of machines, which launched in December 2020. It is the successor to the Aikatsu on Parade! Unlike the previous series of arcade games, it revolves around using collectible swing cards for the idol battle stage.

A hybrid live-action Tokusatsu drama / anime television adaptation by BN Pictures aired from January 10 to June 27, 2021.

A sequel film, Aikatsu Planet! The Movie was released on July 15, 2022.

== Plot ==
An ordinary first-year student at the private academy Seirei Private High School named Mao Otoha is in a place of Meisa Hinata, who suddenly disappeared, taking the avatar of Aikatsu Planet!'s top idol Hana to begin her idol activities However, Mao's new role as Hana is a secret kept from everyone else.

In the adored virtual world of "Aikatsu Planet!", real life idols can become an avatar. Mao, who assume the role as Hana, uses "Swing Card" with her chosen "Dressia" to put on a dress, and begins the world of intense Battle Stages with her rivals. Along with her best friend Shiori Motoya, model Ruli Tamaki, as well as senior Kyōko Umekōji, they aim to be top idols together.

== Production ==
On August 10, 2020 Aikatsu Planet! was officially announced during a press conference of Bandai x BN Pictures Festival alongside its cast. The series was originally set to premiere in October 2020, but the series was delayed to January 2021 due to the COVID-19 pandemic in Japan. The series aired from January 10 to June 27, 2021.

== Episodes ==
No.	Title	Original release date
1	"Suddenly an Idol"; Transliteration: "Aidoru wa Totsuzen ni" (Japanese: アイドルは突然に)	January 10, 2021
2	"An Idol After All☆"; Transliteration: "Nantettatte Aidoru☆" (Japanese: なんてったってアイドル☆)	January 17, 2021
3	"My Heart Beats for the Dress♡"; Transliteration: "Doresu ni mune kyun♡" (Japanese: ドレスに胸キュン♡)	January 24, 2021
4	"Yamato Nadeshiko Rock Change"; Transliteration: "Yamato Nadeshiko Rokku Henge" (Japanese: やまとなでしこロック変化)	January 31, 2021
5	"Cinderella Girl"; Transliteration: "Shinderera Gāru" (Japanese: シンデレラガール)	February 7, 2021
6	"The Cupid of Perfection"; Transliteration: "Pāfekuto no Kamisama" (Japanese: パーフェクトの神様)	February 14, 2021
7	"Dancing Meruli Ruli!"; Transliteration: "Odoru Meruri Ruri!" (Japanese: 踊るメルリルリ！)	February 21, 2021
8	"Rock'n' Beat!"; Transliteration: "Rokkun Bīto!" (Japanese: ロックンビート！)	February 28, 2021
9	"My Revolution"; Transliteration: "Mai Reboryūshon" (Japanese: マイ レボリューション)	March 7, 2021
10	"The One and Only Hana in the World"; Transliteration: "Sekai ni Hitotsu Dake no Hana" (Japanese: 世界に一つだけのハナ)	March 14, 2021
11	"Kind Feelings"; Transliteration: "Yasashii Kimochi" (Japanese: やさしい気持ち)	March 21, 2021
12	"High School Lullaby"; Transliteration: "Hai Sukūru Rarabai" (Japanese: ハイスクールララバイ)	March 28, 2021
13	"Shifting Feelings"; Transliteration: "Yureru Omoi" (Japanese: ゆれる思い)	April 4, 2021
14	"That's The Way I Run"; Transliteration: "Kore ga Watashi no Hashiru Michi" (Japanese: これがわたしの走る道)	April 11, 2021
15	"Rose of Passion"; Transliteration: "Jōnetsu no Bara" (Japanese: 情熱のバラ)	April 18, 2021
16	"Pajama Party Night"; Transliteration: "Pajama Pātī Naito" (Japanese: パジャマパーティーナイト)	April 25, 2021
17	"The Dress is a Question"; Transliteration: "Doresu wa Kuesuchon" (Japanese: ドレスはクエスチョン)	May 2, 2021
18	"Fashion!"; Transliteration: "Oshare!" (Japanese: オシャレ！)	May 9, 2021
19	"Just By You Being Here"; Transliteration: "Kimi ga Iru Dake de" (Japanese: 君がいるだけで)	May 16, 2021
20	"5 Seconds Before Battle!"; Transliteration: "Maji de Batoru no Gobyō Mae!" (Japanese: マジでバトルの５秒前！)	May 23, 2021
21	"Our Planet☆"; Transliteration: "Futari no Puranetto☆" (Japanese: ふたりのプラネット☆)	May 30, 2021
22	"Bloomy＊Smile"; Transliteration: "Bloomy*Sumairu" (Japanese: Bloomy＊スマイル)	June 6, 2021
23	"Into a Dream"; Transliteration: "Yume no Naka e" (Japanese: 夢の中へ)	June 13, 2021
24	"Everyone's Request"; Transliteration: "Minna no Rikuesuto" (Japanese: みんなのリクエスト)	June 20, 2021
25	"SWEET MEMORIES"	June 27, 2021

== Media ==
=== Video games ===
- Aikatsu Planet! (Data Carddass, 2020)
- Aikatsu Planet! Unit Stage (Data Carddass, 2022)

=== Music ===
The anime uses two pieces of theme songs. The opening theme is "Bloomy Smile" by Mao, Ruli, Kyōko and Shiori from Starry Planet, while the ending theme is "Glittering Party Time" (キラリパーティタイム, Kirari Pāti Taimu) by all members of Starry Planet.

Insert songs

- Happy Aikatsu! (Happy アイカツ！) - Meisa (Episode 1), Mao and Ruli (Episode 2), Ayumi(Episode 5), Mao and Ann (Episode 12), Mao, Ruli, Kyōko, and Shiori (Episode 12)
- Flying Tip - Ruli and Ayumi (Episode 6), Mao and Ayumi (Episode 13)
- Magical Door - Ruli and Shiori from Starry Planet (Episode 9)
- See You See You See You See You See You Tomorrow (またまたまたまたまた明日, Mata Mata Mata Mata Mata Ashita) - Mao and Shiori (Episode 10), Ayumi and Kyōko (Episode 14)
- Inner Voice - Ruli and Meisa (Episode 15), Ruli and Kyōko (Episode 20)
- Petit Price Everyday (プチプラ Everyday, Puchipura Everyday) - Ann and Sara (Episode 17), Shiori and Sara (Episode 18)
- Soulmate (ココロノトモ, Kokoro no Tomo) - Mao and Shiori

=== Film ===
Aikatsu Planet! The Movie, was released in theaters in Japan on July 15, 2022.

== Cast ==
- Mao Otoha (音羽 舞桜, Otoha Mao): Kāya Date (伊達 花彩, Date Kaaya)
- Ruli Tamaki (珠樹 るり, Tamaki Ruri): Rio Ogura (小椋 梨央, Ogura Rio)
- Kyoko Umekoji (梅小路 響子, Umekoji Kyōko): Shizune Nagao (長尾 寧音, Nagao Shizune)
- Shiori Motoya (本谷 栞, Motoya Shiori): Rion Watanabe (渡邊 璃音, Watanabe Rion)
- Ayumi Tsukishiro (月城 愛弓, Tsukishiro Ayumi): Mizuki (瑞季)
- Ann Kurimu (栗六 杏, Kurimu An): Amy (エイミー, Eimī)
- Meisa Hinata (陽 明咲, Hinata Meisa): Narumi Uno (宇野 愛海, Uno Narumi)
- Sala Itoi (糸井 紗良, Itoi Sara): Rurika Uno (羽野 瑠華, Uno Rurika)
- Izumi Watanuki (綿貫 いずみ, Watanuki Izumi): Sayaka Akimoto (秋元 才加, Akimoto Sayaka)
- Itsuki Segawa (瀬川 樹, Segawa Itsuki): Shimba Tsuchiya (土屋 神葉, Tsuchiya Shinba)
- Keito Kirihata (桐畠 敬斗, Kirihata Keito): Kaito Irie (入江 海斗, Irie Kaito])
- Shō Kurosaki (黒崎 翔, Kurosaki Shō): Makoto Yamashita (山下 真人, Yamashita Makoto)
- Ryōka Dōba (堂場 涼香, Dōba Ryōka): Sumire Hanaoka (花岡 すみれ, Hanaoka Sumire)
- Sō Otoha (音羽 奏, Otoha Sō): Shunsuke Oe (大江 駿輔, Ōe Shunsuke)
- Aurora Pegasus (オーロラペガサス, Ōrora Pegasasu; Voice): Mitsuki Saiga (斎賀 みつき, Saiga Mitsuki)
- Smart Kyubi (スマートキュウビ, Sumāto Kyūbi; Voice): Azusa Tadokoro (田所 あずさ, Tadokoro Azusa)
- Bright Sapphire (ブライトサファイア, Buraito Safaia; Voice): Sumire Morohoshi (諸星 すみれ, Morohoshi Sumire)
- Glossy Ruby (グロッシールビー, Gurosshi Rubī; Voice): Shino Shimoji (下地 紫野, Shimoji Shino)
- Love Sagittarius (ラブサジタリウス, Rabu Sajitariusu; Voice): Ryoko Shiraishi (白石 涼子, Shiraishi Ryōko)
- Noble Leo (ノーブルレオ, Nōburu Reo; Voice): Shun Horie (堀江 瞬, Horie Shun)
- Bloody Rock (ブラッディロック, Buraddi Rokku; Voice): Akane Matsunaga (松永 あかね, Matsunaga Akane)
- Hip Hop Break (ヒップホップブレイク, Hippu Hoppu Bureiku; Voice): Rin Aira (逢来りん, Aira Rin)
- Wonderland Tale (ワンダーランドテイル, Wandārando Teiru; Voice): Miyu Tomita (富田 美憂, Tomita Miyu)
- Ivy Sleeping (アイビースリーピング, Aibī Surīpingu; Voice): Megumi Yamaguchi (山口 愛, Yamaguchi Megumi)
- Sweet Whole Cake (スウイートホールケーキ, Suīto Hōru Kēki; Voice): Ibuki Kido (木戸 衣吹, Kido Ibuki)
- Pop Melon Crepe (ポップメロンクレープ, Poppu Meron Kurēpu; Voice): Yui Ninomiya (二ノ宮ゆい, Ninomiya Yui)
- Pureful Phoenix (ピュアフルフェニックス, Pyuafuru Fenikkusu; Voice): Atsushi Tamaru (田丸 篤志, Tamaru Atsuhi)
- Haute Couture Mirror (オートクチュールミラー, Ōto Kuchūru Mirā; Voice): Yui Ishikawa (石川 由依, Ishikawa Yui)
- Modern Eau de Parfum (モダンオーデパルファム, Modan Ōde Parufamu; Voice): Yū Wakui (和久井 優, Wakui Yū)
