= Aikatsu on Parade! =

Japanese arcade game & anime television series

- Anime key visual

アイカツオンパレード! (Aikatsu on Parēdo!)
- Genre: Idol; Crossover fiction
- Created by: BN Pictures (story); Bandai (concept)
- Anime television series
- Directed by: Shishō Igarashi
- Written by: Yūko Kakihara
- Music by: Digz Motion Sounds
- Studio: BN Pictures
- Original network: TXN (TV Tokyo), BS TV Tokyo, AT-X; Dream Story; YouTube
- Original run: October 5, 2019 – July 11, 2020
- Episodes: 25 + 6 ONAs
- Video games
- Aikatsu on Parade! (Data Carddass, 2019); Aikatsu on Parade! Dream Story (Data Carddass, 2020)
- Other series
- Aikatsu! (2012); Aikatsu Stars! (2016); Aikatsu Friends! (2018); Aikatsu on Parade! (2019); Aikatsu Planet! (2021); Aikatsu Academy! (2024)
- icon

Aikatsu on Parade! (Japanese: アイカツオンパレード！, Hepburn: Aikatsu on Parēdo!) is an arcade collectible card game in Bandai's Data Carddass line of machines, which launched in October 2019. It is the spin-off to the Aikatsu Friends! and crossover to the Aikatsu!, Aikatsu Stars! series of arcade games and the story is set at alternate universe. An anime television adaptation by BN Pictures premiered from October 5, 2019, to July 11, 2020. It was succeeded by Aikatsu Planet! on January 10, 2021.

== Character ==
Raki Kiseki (姫石らき, Kiseki Raki)

Voiced by: Rin Aira

A second-year middle school student who transfers to Star Harmony Academy to become an idol. However, when Raki uses an Aikatsu Pass, received from her elder sister Saya, an Aikatsu engineer, something mysterious happens. When Raki opens doors before her, she meets Aikatsu! idols she never knew before and vows to design her own premium rare dress and perform in it on stage.

== Media ==
An anime television series produced by BN Pictures aired on TV Tokyo from October 5, 2019, replacing the Japanese dub of PAW Patrol in its time slot. A manga adaptation has been serialized in Pucchigumi since their November 2019 issue.

=== Episodes ===
No.	Title	Original release date
1	"Let's Open It! The Door to Aikatsu!"; Transliteration: "Akechao! Aikatsu! no Tobira" (Japanese: あけちゃお！アイカツ！のトビラ)	October 5, 2019
Raki Kiseki is about to begin idol activities as a second-year middle school student. Her older sister, an Aikatsu! engineer who works with the Aikatsu! system, gives Raki a special Aikatsu pass before wishing her luck. At Star Harmony Academy, Raki meets Aine Yūki and Mio Minato, who are carrying out the introduction for new idols. Aine and Mio perform in their Jeweling Dresses before the new idols are asked to perform, starting with Raki. After the performance, Raki is talking to Aine and Mio when her Aikatsu pass begins to glow, and a mysterious door appears.
2	"Exciting Inspiration"; Transliteration: "Wakuwaku Insupirēshon" (Japanese: ワクワクインスピレーション)	October 12, 2019
Raki, Aine, and Mio find themselves teleported to Four Star Academy. They are introduced to Yume Nijino of Four Star Academy and her friend Koharu Nanakura. Although the idols can sense that each of them is talented, neither groups have heard of each other. Having no way to return to Star Harmony Academy, Raki, Aine, and Mio decide to stay with Yume and Koharu at Four Star Academy. As luck would have it, Yume's friend and fellow S4 member, Mahiru Kasumi, is hosting a fashion show with her premium rare dress, and Raki is determined to see it for inspiration. Meanwhile, Yume and Mio believe they have a perfect opportunity to learn from each other's Aikatsu and shine brighter as idols.
3	"The Unexpected Mermaid"; Transliteration: "Māmeido wa Totsuzen ni" (Japanese: マーメイドはとつぜんに)	October 19, 2019
Raki, Aine, and Mio are still at Four Star Academy with no idea how to return to Star Harmony Academy. Yume and Koharu are hosting an event for their brand Rainbow Berry Parfait, so they invite Raki and the others to attend. Raki is thrilled to see more dresses and asks Koharu about her designs. After watching Yume and Koharu perform, Raki admits that only person she has yet to see is Ako Saotome, so the three idols go to find her. Ako is busy filming a mermaid movie when some of the actors fail to show up. Luckily, Raki, Aine, and Mio make perfect stand-in.
4	"Feel it! The Passionate Wind"; Transliteration: "Kanjichao! Atsui Kaze" (Japanese: 感じちゃお！アツい風)	October 26, 2019
Raki, Aine, and Mio manage to return to Star Harmony Academy where, despite spending several days at four Star Academy, no time seems to have passed back home. The girls discuss their adventure with Maika and Ema, who become excited about going to Four Star Academy. Unfortunately no one seems to have heard of the school or can find any information on it. When Maika and Ema head to a Honey Cat Fan Festival, they meet two mysterious idols named Hinaki Shinjo and Juri Kurebayashi from Starlight Academy.
5	"Lucky Halloween" (Japanese: ラッキー☆ハロウィン)	November 2, 2019
Raki, Aine, and Mio meet the second generation Aikatsu! idols at Starlight Academy. The school is hosting a Halloween event with a costume contest, where the two winning idols get to perform as a unit. Karen and Mirai also have been transported to Starlight Academy and are helping with the contest.
6	"Four Shining Stars"; Transliteration: "Kirameku Yotsuboshi" (Japanese: キラめく四つ星)	November 9, 2019
As Raki is about to perform at Starlight Academy, her Aikatsu pass suddenly starts shining and she is pulled through another door. Raki arrives back at Four Star Academy city and manages to interrupt a performance by the 25th generation S4, Hime Shiratori, Tsubasa Kisaragi, Yozora Kasumi, and Yuzu Nikaido. Luckily, Yuzu manages to pass off the interruption as a prank on the other members and the concert continues. Afterwards, Aine and Mio, who also managed to get pulled through the door, meet Yume Nijino and explain what happened to S4. As punishment for ruining S4 performance, Raki becomes its assistant and learns all about the hard work it takes for idols to shine.
7	"The Three Shining Suns"; Transliteration: "Kagayaku Mittsu no Taiyō" (Japanese: かがやく三つの太陽)	November 16, 2019
Raki, Aine, and Mio are taken through another door to a shopping district. The idols stop by a bento restaurant where they meet Ichigo Hoshimiya, Aoi Kiriya, and Ran Shibuki. Having heard of the Star Harmony idols winning the Halloween costume contest, Ichigo and her friends want to find out more about them. Equally, Raki, Aine and Mio want to learn about the Starlight idols, so Ichigo's mother Ringo allows Aine and Mio to work at the bento shop for a day, while Ichigo lets Raki be Soleil's assistant for their upcoming concert.
8	"Let's Make It! Lucky Dress"; Transliteration: "Tsukucchao! Rakkī Doresu" (Japanese: 作っちゃお！ラッキードレス)	November 23, 2019
Raki, Aine, and Mio are invited to watch a Soleil concert by Ichigo. At the concert, Ichigo shows of her Pisces Constellation dress which sets Raki off in a creative frenzy. Raki creates her own version of the dress, but Mio warns her that it would be rude to the designer if she made it, as the dress is heavily influenced by Ichigo's. However, Ringo suggests Raki ask Angely Sugar's designer, Asuka Amahane, for advice.
9	"Let's Ride it! A Big Wave"; Transliteration: "Nocchao! Biggu U~ēbu" (Japanese: 乗っちゃお！ビッグウェーブ)	November 30, 2019
Raki, Aine, and Mio pass through another door and end up on a ship in the middle of the sea, with Ichigo unexpectedly following them. The four idols are suddenly apprehended by the ships crew and locked up. Raki's sister Saya shows up to help them escape and gives them disguises. Saya informs the idols that they are on an idol school ship called Neo Venus Ark and that she is researching idol pirates. Raki pushes Saya to explain more about her Aikatsu pass but all Saya says is that the "experiment" is entering its final phase. The idols are caught again and brought before Elza Forte, the proprietor of the ship and a top idol, and Ichigo discovers that Mizuki Kanzaki and Mikuru Natsuki are aboard too. Elza decides to make things interesting and has the idols compete against each other.
10	"Aikatsu! Top Gun!" (Japanese: アイカツ！トップガン！)	December 7, 2019
Recent developments in the Aikatsu! world have seen various idol schools being connected together, allowing different idols the chance to meet each other. For this reason, Karen and Mirai invite the top idols – Hibiki Tensho, Alicia Charlotte, Mizuki Kanzaki, Hime Shiratori and Elza Forte – to Karen's mansion to take advantage to the situation and plan a collaboration event between the schools.
11	"Ciao, New World!" (Japanese: ちゃお☆ニューワールド！)	December 14, 2019
The Aikatsu! New World Festival begins, and Raki is eager to take advantage of it and see as many idols and dresses as possible. While Aine and Mio host the Collaboration Stage at Star Harmony Academy, Raki goes with Yume and Akari to the other schools to see what's going on. At Dream Academy they find the Rock Stage and that Ichigo will be performing with Seira Otoshiro as 2WingS. Yume also gets a surprise when Rola Sakuraba shows up. Both Seira and Rola express their passion for Rock and Roll before performing on stage. The performances give Yume and Akari a desire to perform together.
12	"Happy Lucky Christmas"; Transliteration: "Hapi Raki☆Kurisumasu" (Japanese: ハピラキ☆クリスマス)	December 21, 2019
The final day of the Aikatsu! New World Festival gets underway. Raki hosts the event from Dream Academy along with Noel Otoshiro and Madoka Amahane. Each school hosts an event related to Christmas, such as baking a Christmas cake or making a Christmas wreath, while different idols perform together.
13	"Raki and the Winged Dress"; Transliteration: "Raki to Tsubasa no Doresu" (Japanese: らきとツバサのドレス)	December 28, 2019
Raki boards Neo Venus Ark to show Elza a dress she designed based on Elza's wing dress. However, Elza feels insulted by the imitation and tells Raki she only accepts perfect dresses. Rei and Kirara come to Raki's rescue and suggest that Raki help out with the preparations for the New Year Revival Fashion Collection event being held at the school. This would give Raki as chance to design a dress worthy of Elza's praise. Despite Rei, Kirara, and Aria's assistance, Raki struggles to find inspiration until Mahiru arrives with advice.
14	"Smile Nyan-ber One" (Japanese: スマイル にゃんばーワン)	January 11, 2020
Yuzu Nikaido and Lily Shirogane have been left in charge of Ako's animal show while the latter is away filming abroad. Wanting to make the show successful, Yuzu and Lily enlist the help of Raki, Maika, Ema and a comedian idol named Nina Dōjima.
15	"Powa Fuwa Dreamin'" (Japanese: ぽわフワドリーミン)	January 18, 2020
Ako and Kirara host a fan meeting at the Dream Park Land theme park alongside Starlight Academy's Otome Arisugawa, Sakura Kitaoji, and Shion Kamiya, with Raki reporting for the TV broadcast. However, things take a dramatic turn when Coco decides to take over the event. Luckily, Aine, Mio, and Yume are on hand to save the day.
16	"Raki's Radiance"; Transliteration: "Kagayaki no Raki" (Japanese: 輝きのらき)	January 25, 2020
Raki travels to the Kingdom of Sorbett as part of an entertainment troupe, created by Hibiki from various acting idols. Alicia is holding an event where an old Sorbett fairy tale will be brought to life through Aikatsu! Raki is surprised to learn she will be playing the part of the Frost Princess, Grace, who saves the day by stopping two Princesses of Flame from arguing. Hibiki also asks Raki with creating Grace' costume and despite being eager at first, she soon begins to doubt Hibiki's decision. However, after talking to Alicia, Raki gets the motivation she needs to pull through.
17	"Gothic Wars" (Japanese: ゴシック ウォーズ)	February 1, 2020
Raki wakes up to an emergency phone call from her sister, the Moon Princesses are invading Earth and turning everyone into their bunny eared servants. Raki cannot believe what is happening and is taken by a mind controlled Aine and Mio to see the Princesses. Sakuya Shirayuri and Kaguya Shirayuri attempt to turn Raki into one of their servants but she is saved by Alicia Charlotte, Lily Shirogane, and Yurika Toudou. Yurika challenges the Princesses to a duel, with Sumire Hikami appearing and siding with Sakuya and Kaguya, who subsequently transport everyone to the Moon. As the Gothic War begins, Raki is determined to save the day.
18	"Your Entrance"; Transliteration: "Kimi no Entoransu" (Japanese: 君のエントランス)	February 8, 2020
Hime is hosting a Brand Collaboration Event and has asked Koharu, Sora, and Raki to participate. Hime asks Raki to create her own unique dress and Raki sees this as an opportunity to create her Premium Rare Dress. However, when Raki manages to finish the dress for the event, she feels it is missing something.
19	"Dance, Valentine Sweets"; Transliteration: "Odoru, Barentain Suītsu" (Japanese: 踊る バレンタインスイーツ)	February 15, 2020
Raki wants to give Valentine's Day sweets to all the idols that have helped her but is unsure of what to get. Aine suggests she goes to the Valentine Festival, while there Raki learns all about the traditions of Valentine's Day and different varieties of sweets people like.
20	"Shine, Local Idols"; Transliteration: "Kagayake, Gotōji Aidoru" (Japanese: 輝け ご当地アイドル)	February 22, 2020
Raki is asked to help out at the Local Idol Festival, an event where idols from all over Japan come together to perform. Raki is given the task of registering idols as they arrive, which she feels enthusiastic about because she will get the chance to interact with many idols. However, she later realizes that the appearance of local idols from Hokkaido get delayed.
21	"Let's Go! Aikatsu! Grand Sports Fest!"; Transliteration: "Hashire! Aikatsu! Dai Undō Fesu!" (Japanese: 走れ！アイカツ！大運動フェス！)	February 29, 2020
Raki is taking part in the Aikatsu Grand Sports Festival, where idols will compete in different sporting events. Raki will compete in a rally with the red team consisting of Madoka, Rin, and Wakaba. The former is also chosen to give the Aikatsu! oath at the start of the festival, which she uses to affirm her promise to create an event that makes everyone smile. However, during training, Raki injures her ankle and got disqualified from the competition, only to eventually find a way to take part and keep her promise.
22	"Everyone Gathered! On Parade!"; Transliteration: "Zen'in Shūgō! On Parēdo!" (Japanese: 全員集合！オンパレード！)	March 7, 2020
Raki has decided to prepare for a three-day event called Aikatsu on Parade! She asks the Starlight idols to participate, who all agree except Mizuki. Mizuki expresses her belief that Raki does not understand the sacrifices other idols are making for her event. Determine to make the event a success, Raki creates a stage that will make the Starlight idols shine.
23	"Stars! On Parade!" (Japanese: スターズ！オンパレード！)	March 14, 2020
The second day of Aikatsu on Parade! is about to start, and it is Four Star Academy's idols turn to shine. Everything appears to be going to plan until Raki learns that Hime is missing. Feeling a little down-hearted, Raki continues with the show. However, when Hime calls and explains what happen, Raki does everything possible to rearrange the event until Hime arrives.
24	"Friends! On Parade!"; Transliteration: "Tomodachi! On Parēdo!" (Japanese: ともだち！オンパレード！)	March 21, 2020
The final day of Aikatsu on Parade! dawns at Star Harmony Academy, and everyone is ready to start the event. Wakaba gives Raki a good luck charm before the proceedings and Raki makes a wish that the event be a success. As the performances get underway, a sudden rain shower temporarily halts proceedings. However, things become much worse when the shower brings some unexpected guests to the event. Luckily, everyone lends a hand to get things back on track.
25	"To the Shining Future"; Transliteration: "Hikaru Mirai e" (Japanese: 光る未来へ)	March 28, 2020
Aine and Mio invite Raki on a picnic, where they are joined by Ichigo, Akari, and Yume. The idols reveal that they want to thank Raki for the success of Aikatsu! on Parade, so they are planning on a joint performance. Raki's sister Saya returns home and finally reveals the truth behind her experiment to unite the worlds of Aikatsu, but the experiment must come to an end and the worlds must be separated. Saya tells Raki it will be the last time she gets to perform with her new friends.

=== Aikatsu on Parade! Dream Story ===
An original net animation titled Aikatsu on Parade! Dream Story aired from March 28, 2020, to July 11, 2020, after the television series ended, along with an addition to the Data Carddass game. It revolves around a grown-up Noel Otoshiro from the original Aikatsu! series, who attends Dream Academy following the footsteps of her older sister, Seira.

No.	Title	Original release date
1	"Noeru Dream: Part 1" (Japanese: ノエルドリーム 前編)	March 28, 2020
2	"Noeru Dream: Part 2" (Japanese: ノエルドリーム 後編)	April 11, 2020
3	"Commence! Dream School Grand Prix: Part 1" (Japanese: 開幕！ドリームスクールグランプリ 前編)	May 2, 2020
4	"Commence! Dream School Grand Prix: Part 2" (Japanese: 開幕！ドリームスクールグランプリ 前編)	May 30, 2020
5	"Stage In Bloom: Part 1" (Japanese: 花咲くステージ 前編)	July 11, 2020
6	"Stage In Bloom: Part 2" (Japanese: 花咲くステージ 後編)	July 11, 2020
