= Fumikane Shimada =

Japanese illustrator & character designer

- Born: 26 January 1974 (age 52); Okayama Prefecture, Japan
- Known for: Character design, illustration

Fumikane Shimada (島田 フミカネ, Shimada Fumikane; born January 26, 1974), is an anime and video game illustrator and character designer from Okayama Prefecture.

== Biography ==
Shimada is well known for sparking the mecha shoujo boom of the 2000s with his line of mecha musume illustrations. During this time he provided illustrations for various dōjin and commercial hobbyist magazines some of which were turned into popular figurines and model kits by Toranoana and Konami. Since then, Shimada has worked as a character and mechanical designer for various military-themed anime television series and video games.

In July 2013, Shimada was responsible for designing military recruitment posters and other promotional material for the Japan Self-Defense Forces.

== Art style ==
Shimada's designs commonly combine bishōjo characters, moe elements, and mechanical systems such as military-style weapons, armor, or vehicles. Some of his most iconic character designs in this style come from the Strike Witches franchise. In it young girls with Kemonomimi use machines that attach to their legs to fly and fight aliens with weapons as part of a military force.

== Main works ==
Anime
Year	Title	Role	References
2006-2007	Sky Girls	Conceptual mechanical design Original character design	
2007-present	Strike Witches/World Witches	Original character design	
2011-2012	Busou Shinki		
2012-present	Girls und Panzer	character design	
2015	Kantai Collection	Original character design	
2017-2019	Frame Arms Girl		
2019	Gundam Build Divers Re:Rise	Character design (Mobile Doll May)	
2021	Midnight Fun Nora Version		
2023	Alice Gear Aegis: Expansion		
	Tsukuyomi: Moon Phase		

Video games
Year	Title	Role	References
	Hayate the Combat Butler: Nightmare Paradise	Mechanical design	
2006-present	Busou Shinki		
2009	Dariusburst		
2013-present (Note: Last contribution on the 10/08/2017)	Kantai Collection	Original character design, in-game sprite illustrations	
2018-present	Alice Gear Aegis		
2019	Sakura Wars	Guest character design for the Berlin Combat Revue (Elise and Margarethe)	
2020-present	Strike Witches	Character design	
2021	Fate/Grand Order	Character design (Galatea)	

Commercial magazines
Year	Title	Role	References
	MC Akushizu	Cover (Vol.1, Vol. 3)	
	Spiegel Series	Illustration	

Figures and Model Kits
Year	Title	Role	References
	Mecha musume	Character design	
	Busou Shinki	Character design	
	Frame Arms Girl	Character design	
	Megami Device	Character design	
	30 Minutes Sisters	Character design	

Dōjinshi
Year	Title	Role	References
	(幻の歩兵戦)		
	Strike Witches: Witches of Africa (ストライクウィッチーズ アフリカの魔女)	Illustrations	

Art books
Year	Title	Role	References
	島田フミカネ ART WORKS』, published by Kadokawa Group Publishing		ISBN 9784048542210

CD
Year	Title	Role	References
	Senpai mo Kōhai mo Osananajimi mo Tsundere de Nemurenai CD (先輩も後輩も幼なじみもツンデレで眠れないCD)		

Cards
Year	Title	Role	References
	MCTCG Fairy Lore (MCTCG妖精伝承)		

illustration project
Year	Title	Role	References
	Bio-station Mars (火星生物局)	Original narrative/illustration work	
