= Strike Witches =

Japanese media franchise

- First light novel volume cover, featuring Tomoko Anabuki

ストライクウィッチーズ (Sutoraiku Witchīzu)
- Genre: Alternate history; Girls with guns; Military science fiction
- Created by: Fumikane Shimada
Further information
Manga
Strike Witches Sōkū no Otome-tachi
Written by	Yoshiyuki Kazumi
Published by	Kadokawa Shoten
Magazine	Comp Ace
Original run	September 26, 2005 – January 26, 2006
Light novel
Strike Witches Suomus Iranko Chūtai Ganbaru (1), Koisuru (2), Hajikeru (3)
Written by	Noboru Yamaguchi
Illustrated by	Fumikane Shimada; Hashigo Ueda
Published by	Kadokawa Shoten
Imprint	Kadokawa Sneaker Bunko
Original run	October 2006 – July 2008
Volumes	3
Original video animation
Directed by	Kunihisa Sugishima
Studio	Gonzo
Released	January 1, 2007
Runtime	24 minutes
Manga
Strike Witches: Maidens in the Sky
Written by	Yuki Tanaka
Published by	Kadokawa Shoten
English publisher	NA: Seven Seas Entertainment
Magazine	Comp Ace
Original run	January 26, 2008 – November 26, 2008
Volumes	2
Anime television series
Directed by	Kazuhiro Takamura
Written by	Tsuyoshi Tamai; Shouji Saeki; Takaaki Suzuki; Tatsuhiko Urahata
Music by	Seikou Nagaoka
Studio	Gonzo
Licensed by	Crunchyroll
Original network	Chiba TV
Original run	July 3, 2008 – September 18, 2008
Episodes	12
Light novel
Strike Witches Otome no Maki
Written by	Hidehisa Nanbō
Illustrated by	Fumikane Shimada; Hashigo Ueda
Published by	Kadokawa Shoten
Imprint	Kadokawa Sneaker Bunko
Original run	August 1, 2008 – July 1, 2010
Volumes	4
Manga
Strike Witches: The Sky That Connects Us
Written by	Shin Kyogoku
Published by	Kadokawa Shoten
English publisher	NA: Seven Seas Entertainment
Magazine	NyanType
Original run	September 30, 2009 – July 30, 2010
Volumes	1
Anime television series
Strike Witches 2
Directed by	Kazuhiro Takamura
Written by	Striker Unit
Music by	Seikou Nagaoka
Studio	AIC Spirits
Licensed by	Crunchyroll
Original network	BS11, Chiba TV, Sun TV, Tokyo MX, TV Aichi, tvk, TV Saitama, TVQ
Original run	July 7, 2010 – September 23, 2010
Episodes	12
Light novel
Strike Witches 2
Written by	Hidehisa Nanbō
Illustrated by	Fumikane Shimada; Shin Kyogoku
Published by	Kadokawa Shoten
Imprint	Kadokawa Sneaker Bunko
Original run	September 1, 2010 – September 30, 2010
Volumes	2
Manga
Strike Witches: 1937 Fuso Sea Incident
Written by	Projekt Kagonish; Fumikane Shimada
Illustrated by	Ningen
Published by	Kadokawa Shoten
English publisher	NA: Seven Seas Entertainment
Magazine	NyanType
Original run	October 30, 2010 – November 30, 2011
Volumes	2
Manga
Strike Witches: One-Winged Witches
Written by	Atsuto Shinozuka
Published by	Kadokawa Shoten
English publisher	NA: Seven Seas Entertainment
Magazine	Comp Ace
Original run	April 26, 2011 – June 26, 2012
Volumes	2
Manga
Strike Witches: The Witches of Africa
Written by	Takeshi Nogami; Takaaki Suzuki
Published by	Kadokawa Shoten
Magazine	Comptiq
Published	January 26, 2012
Volumes	1
Light novel
Strike Witches: The Witches of Africa
Written by	Takaaki Suzuki
Illustrated by	Fumikane Shimada; Takeshi Nogami
Published by	Kadokawa Shoten
Imprint	Kadokawa Sneaker Bunko
Published	March 2012
Volumes	1
Anime film
Strike Witches: The Movie
Directed by	Kazuhiro Takamura
Produced by	Hisashi Imamoto; Yoshiyuki Matsuzaki
Written by	Striker Unit
Music by	Seikou Nagaoka
Studio	AIC
Licensed by	Crunchyroll
Released	March 17, 2012
Runtime	97 minutes
Light novel
Strike Witches gekijo-ban Kaeritai Sora
Written by	Hidehisa Nanbō
Illustrated by	Fumikane Shimada
Published by	Kadokawa Shoten
Imprint	Kadokawa Sneaker Bunko
Published	April 2012
Volumes	1
Original video animation
Strike Witches: Operation Victory Arrow
Directed by	Kazuhiro Takamura
Written by	Striker Unit
Music by	Seikou Nagaoka
Studio	Silver Link
Released	September 20, 2014 – May 2, 2015
Runtime	30 minutes each
Episodes	3
Anime television series
Brave Witches
Directed by	Kazuhiro Takamura
Produced by	Takashi Tachizaki
Written by	Striker Unit
Music by	Seikou Nagaoka
Studio	Silver Link
Licensed by	Crunchyroll
Original network	Tokyo MX, TV Saitama, Chiba TV, tvk, KBS, BS11, TVQ, Sun TV, AT-X
English network	SEA: Animax Asia
Original run	October 5, 2016 – December 28, 2016
Episodes	12 + OVA
Anime television series
Strike Witches: 501st Joint Fighter Wing Take Off!
Directed by	Fumio Ito
Produced by	Takashi Tachizaki
Music by	Seikou Nagaoka
Studio	acca effe; Giga Production
Licensed by	Crunchyroll: SEA: Muse Communication
Original network	Tokyo MX, TV Aichi, MBS, BS11
Original run	April 9, 2019 – June 25, 2019
Episodes	12
Anime television series
Strike Witches: Road to Berlin
Directed by	Hideya Takahashi; Kazuhiro Takamura
Produced by	Takashi Tachizaki
Written by	Striker Unit (series composition); Tatsuhiko Urahata (story composition)
Music by	Seikou Nagaoka
Studio	David Production
Licensed by	NA: Crunchyroll; Funimation; SEA: JOYUPMEDIA
Original network	Tokyo MX, KBS, Sun TV, TV Aichi, BS11
Original run	October 7, 2020 – December 23, 2020
Episodes	12
Anime television series
World Witches Take Off!
Directed by	Fumio Ito
Produced by	Takashi Tachizaki
Music by	Seikou Nagaoka
Studio	acca effe; Giga Production
Licensed by	Crunchyroll
Original network	Tokyo MX, MBS, BS11
Original run	January 13, 2021 – March 31, 2021
Episodes	12
Anime television series
Luminous Witches
Directed by	Shouji Saeki; Kana Shundou (Note: Assistant Director (副監督). See the Shaft directors credit legend.)
Produced by	List: PV: Takashi Tachizaki; Mitsutoshi Kubota; TV: Akiko Ookubo; Naruki Fukaya; Hajime Maruyama; Soujirou Arimizu; Kenichi Tokumura; Chiho Shibayama; Toshiki Fujiwara; Miho Uzuki; Kazuhito Kondou
Written by	Shouji Saeki; Shaft (Note: As Fuyashi Tou (東冨耶子.))
Music by	Yoshiaki Fujisawa
Studio	Shaft
Licensed by	Sentai Filmworks: SEA: Muse Communication
Original network	AT-X, Tokyo MX, TV Aichi, SUN, KBS Kyoto, BS NTV
Original run	July 3, 2022 (Note: The series' first episode had a special premiere at the Luminous Witches 1st Live event on February 20, 2022.) – September 25, 2022
Episodes	12 + Special PV (Note: A special promotional video acting as a prequel to the main television series was released on April 9, 2020.)
- icon

Strike Witches (Japanese: ストライクウィッチーズ, Hepburn: Sutoraiku Witchīzu) is a Japanese media mix franchise originally created by Fumikane Shimada via a series of magazine illustration columns. The illustrations have since inspired several official light novel, manga, and anime series and various video games. The series revolves around teenage moe anthropomorphic girls who use machines attached to their legs to do aerial combat. The original video animation (OVA) preview episode was released in January 2007. The televised anime series later aired between July and September 2008. A second season aired between July and September 2010. A standalone film that continues the storyline was released in March 2012 and a three-part OVA series was released between September 2014 and May 2015. A third season aired from October to December 2020. A spin-off, titled Brave Witches, aired from October to December 2016, and a second spin-off, Luminous Witches, aired from July to September 2022.

== Plot ==
The series takes place in an altered version of Earth, ravaged by the Neuroi. Several large pieces of Earth's landmasses have been obliterated.

On an alternate Earth during the World War II era, the world has been invaded by a mysterious alien force known as the Neuroi who take on forms similar to aircraft and spread a corrosive miasma. As a result, the armed forces of the world have allied together to combat the Neuroi threat instead of fighting among themselves. As the regular weaponry have no effect against the Neuroi's technology, the military instead calls upon Witches, young girls who possess magical abilities capable of fighting against the Neuroi. The Witches, who are inspired by famous real-life pilots, grow animal ears and tails when using their magic, and can use special machines known as Striker Units, which feature designs based on real-life aircraft, to fly through the sky and increase the strength of their magical ability in combat.

The light novel series follows the Suomus Independent Volunteer Aerial Squadron, focusing on a dogfighter named Tomoko Anabuki. The main anime franchise follows Yoshika Miyafuji, a girl from the Fuso Empire who joins the titular Strike Witches to investigate the death of her father and help fight off the Neuroi. The spin-off anime series, Brave Witches, follows a Fuso girl named Hikari Karibuchi, who joins the titular Brave Witches to fight in the place of her injured sister Takami.

== Production ==
In a postscript column in Comp Ace, Fumikane Shimada had mentioned his desire to use his Mecha Musume concepts across a variety of media, leading to the production of the Strike Witches OVA by Gonzo. However, at about the same time Fumikane was also contracted to create the character designs for Sky Girls, which had its televised run in late 2007. During this time there was no word on the further development of a Strike Witches animated series, although promotional items such as plastic figures of the OVA's characters were released. Not until December 2007 was the anime officially announced, after which details were slowly released, such as the casting of the remaining main characters that had no lines in the OVA.

== Media ==
=== Light novels ===
Three separate light novel series have been published. The first, Strike Witches: Suomus Misfits Squadron (ストライクウィッチーズ： スオムスいらん子中隊, Sutoraiku Wichīzu: Iranko Chūtai), was written by Noboru Yamaguchi and illustrated by Hashigo Ueda. The first volume was published on September 30, 2006, and the third and last on June 28, 2008. The Suomus Misfits Squadron series is set in a different time period and location from the anime, and uses a different cast of characters. A reboot of the first series of light novels began in October 2018. It is written by Toshihiko Tsukiji and illustrated by Kōsuke Tsukinami. As of October 2020 four volumes have been published using the title Silent Witches Suoms Iranko Company ReBOOT!

The second light novel series, titled Strike Witches: Maidens' Volume (ストライクウィッチーズ： 乙女ノ巻, Sutoraiku Wichīzu: Otome no Maki), was written by Hidehisa Nanbō and illustrated by Hashigo Ueda. As of June 30, 2010, the fourth and last volume has been published. The publication of this series coincided with the anime television series, and uses the same cast of characters; however, while some of the chapters are adaptations of the anime episodes, several are original.

The third light novel series Noble Witches (ノーブルウィッチーズ, Nōburu Wichīzu) is the stories about the 506th Joint Fighter Wing. The timeline of the story happens in between from the beginning of the Season 2 anime to the before of the film. It is authored by Hidehisa Nanbō. The first volume was published in Japan on 1 January 2015. Volume 2 was published on 1 May 2015 and Volume 3 is published on 1 October 2015. Volume 4 was published on 1 March 2016 and volume 5 was published on 1 November 2016. The latest volume 8 was published on 1 May 2018. There are versions with the five original CD dramas from volumes 3 to 7.

=== Manga ===
There are ten manga series of Strike Witches:

Strike Witches: Maidens of the Blue Skies (ストライクウィッチーズ 蒼空の乙女たち, Sutoraiku Witchīzu: Sōkū no Otome-tachi)
Written and illustrated by Yoshiyuki Kazumi. It was serialized in Comp Ace between September 26, 2005, and January 26, 2006. It was canceled after three chapters.
Strike Witches: Maidens in the Sky (ストライクウィッチーズ 天空の乙女たち, Sutoraiku Witchīzu: Tenkū no Otome-tachi)
Written and illustrated by Yuki Tanaka, was serialized in Comp Ace between January 26 and November 26, 2008, with its chapters collected in two tankōbon volumes. Seven Seas Entertainment released the series in North America in April 2014.
Strike Witches: The Sky that Connects Us (ストライクウィッチーズ キミとつながる空, Sutoraiku Witchīzu: Kimi to Tsunagaru Sora)
Illustrated by Shin Kyogoku. Also referred to as Strike Witches 1.5, which takes place between the two anime series. It was serialized in Nyantype from September 30, 2009, to July 30, 2010, with its chapters collected in a single volume. Seven Seas Entertainment licensed the manga in North America.
Strike Witches Zero: 1937 Fuso Sea Incident (ストライクウィッチーズ零 1937 扶桑海事変, Sutoraiku Witchīzu Zero: 1937 Fusou Kaijihen)
Illustrated by Ningen. It focuses on Mio Sakamoto during the Fuso Sea Incident in 1937. It was serialized in Nyantype from October 30, 2010, to November 30, 2011, with its chapters collected in two volumes. Seven Seas Entertainment licensed the manga in North America.
Strike Witches: One-Winged Witches (ストライクウィッチーズ 片翼の魔女たち, Sutoraiku Witchīzu: Katayoku no Majotachi)
Illustrated by Atsuto Shinozuka. It focuses on the Isle of Wight Detachment Group. It was serialized in Comp Ace between April 26, 2011, to June 26, 2012. Its chapters were collected in two volumes. Seven Seas Entertainment licensed the manga in North America.
Strike Witches: The Witches of Africa (ストライクウィッチーズ アフリカの魔女, Sutoraiku Witchīzu: Africa no Majo)
Illustrated by Takeshi Nogami. Previously a semi-official doujinshi which focuses on the African Front. A chapter was published in Comptiq on November 10, 2011, and a collected volume was released on January 26, 2012.
Strike Witches: Aurora no Majo (ストライクウィッチーズ オーロラの魔女, Sutoraiku Witchīzu: Ōrora no Majo)
Illustrated by Shin Kyogoku. It follows the story of the Suomus LLV24, including telling the stories of Eila Juutilainen and Nikka Katajainen's past, characters who feature in the Strike Witches and Brave Witches anime respectively. It was serialized in Nyantype from September 30, 2013, to October 30, 2014, with its chapters collected in two volumes.
Strike Witches: Kurenai no Majo-tachi (ストライクウィッチーズ 紅の魔女たち, Sutoraiku Witchīzu: Kurenai no Majo-tachi)
Illustrated by Atsuto Shinozuka. It follows the story of the 504th Joint Fighter Wing, taking place before and during the second season of the Strike Witches anime, and covers events from their perspective that correspond to the events of the anime. It was serialized in Comptiq from February 10, 2014, to September 10, 2015, with its chapters collected in three volumes.
Strike Witches: Erica Hartmann 1941 (ストライクウィッチーズ エーリカ・ハルトマン 1941, Sutoraiku Witchīzu: Ērika Harutoman 1941)
Illustrated by Tsuchii. The manga is a prequel story for Erica Hartmann, following her early days in the Karlsland JG52, three years before the start of the Strike Witches anime. It was serialized in Comp Ace between March 26 and September 26, 2016, with its chapters collected in a single volume.
Noble Witches: 506th Joint Fighter Wing (ノーブルウィッチーズ 第506統合戦闘航空団, Nōburu Witchīzu: Dai 506 Tōgō Sentō Kōkūdan)
Illustrated by Tsuchii. A manga adaptation of the first few volumes of the Noble Witches light novel series. It was serialized in Comp Ace from May 26, 2017, to September 26, 2018, with its chapters collected in three volumes.

==== Self published works ====
Strike Witches: Witch in Africa
Published in August 2008, and jointly authored by Fumikane Shimada, Takaaki Suzuki, and Takeshi Nogami. It is considered semi-canonical. The B5-size publication contains a manga and novel section, both dealing primarily with the "Star of Africa" Hanna-Justina Marseille during the North African Campaign. Details on the Strike Witches world setting that could not be added into the anime were also added into the publication.
Strike Witches: Witch in Africa
Originally meant to be included in the anime DVD booklets, but because of a reduction in the booklet size, it was instead published as a dojin. The manga began serialization in Comptiq beginning November 10, 2011.
Strike Witches: Tiger in Desert
Published in December 2008. Similar to the first volume, and set in the same general time frame and location (North Africa, circa 1942). Consisting of two volumes it follows an experimental Karlsland tank witch unit based on the Tiger I.
World Witches: Witches of the Sphinx
Published from 2010 to 2012, the series takes place in North Africa, 1943 and concerns the joint effort of the Storm Witches and three tank witch units under the command of General Patton, General Montgomery and General Rommel in retaking the Suez Canal. Five volumes were released.
Sengoku Witches: The Witch of Honnoji
Published in 2009. Takes place during Japan's Sengoku period. Oda Nobunaga is rescued from Honnoji by his page, in this version the witch Mori Ranmaru, instead of committing suicide in the Honnō-ji Incident.

=== Anime ===
An original video animation directed by Kunihisa Sugishima and produced by Gonzo was released on January 1, 2007. The first anime season was produced by Gonzo and broadcast in Japan from July 3 to September 18, 2008. Aside from the traditional televised broadcast, the series was also made available with English subtitles and an English dub through YouTube, BOST TV and Crunchyroll, using a simultaneous release schedule similar to that of The Tower of Druaga: the Aegis of Uruk, also produced by Gonzo. The YouTube and Crunchyroll broadcasts operate under a streaming window, allowing users to freely watch each new episode of the series on the day of their release for a set amount of time. Crunchyroll also offers individual episodes to be purchased and downloaded during and after this streaming window has ended. An uncensored version of the series was later released on Region 2 DVD, containing nudity that was obscured for the TV broadcast. The first volume was made available on September 26, 2008, the second on October 24, the third volume on November 28, the fourth volume on December 26, and the fifth volume on January 30, 2009. The anime has been licensed by Funimation and was released on March 30, 2010.

A second series, Strike Witches 2, was produced by AIC and aired between July 7 and September 23, 2010. The season was also licensed by Funimation and was simulcast on its video portal, with a home video release in September 2011. The release was held back until October 2, 2012. Manga Entertainment released the series in the United Kingdom on September 24, 2012. A three-part OVA series produced by Silver Link titled Strike Witches: Operation Victory Arrow, which features three short stories taking place between the second anime season and the film, was released between September 20, 2014, and May 2, 2015.

A spin-off series by Silver Link, titled Brave Witches, began airing on October 5, 2016. The series is not a continuation of the previous seasons and instead focuses on the 502nd Joint Fighter Wing. Crunchyroll simulcasted the series worldwide. Funimation has released an English dub of the series. The series is scheduled to be released on Blu-ray and DVD in 2017. A 13th episode aired in theatres in 2017. Madman Entertainment is importing Funimation's release in Australia and New Zealand.

On July 8, 2018, a Strike Witches anime project titled Strike Witches: 501st Joint Fighter Wing Take Off! was announced as part of the World Witches series to commemorate the franchise's tenth anniversary. The 12-episode anime adaptation is based on the 2011 comedy spin-off 4-koma manga series by Makoto Fujibayashi. It aired from April 9 to June 25, 2019, on Tokyo MX, TV Aichi, MBS and BS11. The original cast of Strike Witches returned to reprise their roles. Acca effe and Giga Production are animating the series with Fumio Ito as director. Seiko Nagaoka, returned from Brave Witches to produce the music at Nippon Columbia. Production I.G and Anime Beans have been credited for animation production assistance. Funimation streamed the series with English subs the same day as Japan, with an English dub set for premiere on April 23. The spin-off also received a 30-minute nationwide theatrical release planned for October 4 with returning cast and production committee from the spin-off TV show. A new anime series titled World Witches Take Off! aired from January 13 to March 31, 2021, with the cast and staff from Strike Witches: 501st Joint Fighter Wing Take Off! reprising their roles. The series will run for 12 episodes. Crunchyroll streamed the series with English subtitles.

A third season of Strike Witches series titled Strike Witches: Road to Berlin has been announced and aired from October 7 to December 23, 2020. David Production animated the series with Kazuhiro Takamura returning as director, Striker Unit is handling the series composition, and Tatsuhiko Urata (Strike Witches and Strike Witches 2 scriptwriter) is credited as the chief writer. Seikou Nagaoka will produce the music at Nippon Columbia. Funimation streamed the series with an English dub, while Crunchyroll streamed the series with subtitles.

Another new Strike Witches anime project titled as Luminous Witches was announced. Initially scheduled to air in 2021, it was later delayed to 2022 due to "various circumstances." Shaft animated the series with Shouji Saeki, who served as episode director and scriptwriter for Strike Witches and Strike Witches 2, directing the anime and handling the series composition. Shinya Murakami is credited for the "Witches series literature." Kadokawa produced the music for the release. The series aired from July 3 to September 25, 2022. The cast members performed the opening theme song "Wonderful World", as well as the ending theme song "Watashi to Minna no Uta". Sentai Filmworks has licensed the series.

==== Film ====
On October 28, 2010, a film adaptation of Strike Witches was announced. Produced by AIC, the film was released in Japanese theaters on March 17, 2012, and on DVD and BD on October 26 of that same year. The film was licensed by Funimation; they released it on Blu-ray on October 4, 2016.

A new 30-minute film for Strike Witches: 501st Joint Fighter Wing Take Off! was released in Japanese theaters on October 4, 2019. The main cast members and staff reprise their roles from the anime.

=== Music ===
The first season used two pieces of theme music. "Strike Witches: To Do What I Can" (ストライクウィッチーズ ～わたしにできること～, Sutoraiku Witchīzu ~Watashi ni Dekiru Koto~), performed by Yoko Ishida is used as the opening. "Bookmark A Head" (ブックマーク ア・ヘッド, Bukkumāku A Heddo) is used as the ending. "Bookmark A Head" is performed by the main cast as usually duets and the singers vary from episode to episode. "Lili Marleen" (リリーマルレーン, Ririi Marureen), translated by Takaaki Suzuki, and performed by Minna-Dietlinde Wilcke (Rie Tanaka), is used as an insert song in episode 8. In Funimation's release, Lamp of a Wish (願いの灯火, Negai no Tomoshibi), a song also sung by Rie Tanaka from the CD album for the Strike Witches: What I Can Do Along With You game, was substituted for Lili Marleen.

Ending theme

#	Ending performed by
1 & 2	Misato Fukuen and Saeko Chiba
3	Misato Fukuen and Kaori Nazuka
4	Misato Fukuen and Mie Sonozaki
5	Chiwa Saitō and Ami Koshimizu
6	Mai Kadowaki and Erika Nakai
7	Miyuki Sawashiro and Sakura Nogawa
8	Rie Tanaka and Saeko Chiba
9	Misato Fukuen and Miyuki Sawashiro
10	Misato Fukuen and Rie Tanaka
11	Saeko Chiba and Miyuki Sawashiro
12	Misato Fukuen, Saeko Chiba, Rie Tanaka, Miyuki Sawashiro, Kaori Nazuka, Sakura Nogawa, Mie Sonozaki, Chiwa Saitou, Ami Koshimizu, Mai Kadowaki, and Erika Nakai

The single for "Strike Witches: To Do What I Can" was released on August 20, 2008, by Columbia Music Entertainment and also a version of "Bookmark A Head" performed by Misato Fukuen. An album entitled the "Strike Witches: Ending Theme Complete Collection" (ストライクウィッチーズ Ending Theme Complete Collection, Sutoraiku Witchīzu Ending Theme Complete Collection) was released on October 10, 2008, by Columbia Music Entertainment, containing all versions "Bookmark A Head" as well as the insert "Lili Marleen". The original soundtrack containing 36 tracks was released on September 9, 2008.

For the second season, the opening theme is "STRIKE WITCHES 2 ~The Magic of Smiles~" (STRIKE WITCHES 2 ～笑顔の魔法～, STRIKE WITCHES 2 ~Egao no Mahou~) by Yoko Ishida and the ending theme is "Over Sky", which is once again performed by members of the vocal cast.

For the third season, the opening theme is "Wings of Courage" (勇気の翼, Yuuki no Tsubasa) by Ishida while the ending theme is "Yearning For Your Wings" (君の翼に憧れて, Kimi no Tsubasa ni Akogarete) performed by the vocal cast.

Ending theme

#	Ending performed by
1 & 2	Misato Fukuen and Saori Seto
3	Misato Fukuen, Kaori Nazuka and Miyuki Sawashiro
4	Mie Sonozaki and Ami Koshimizu
5	Misato Fukuen, Chiwa Saito and Ami Koshimizu
6	Mai Kadowaki and Ayuru Ōhashi
7	Rie Tanaka, Mie Sonozaki and Sakura Nogawa
8	Misato Fukuen and Kaori Nazuka
9	Saori Seto and Miyuki Sawashiro
10	Sakura Nogawa and Shizuka Itō
11	Saori Seto and Rie Tanaka
12	Misato Fukuen, Saori Seto, Rie Tanaka, Miyuki Sawashiro, Kaori Nazuka, Sakura Nogawa, Mie Sonozaki, Chiwa Saitou, Ami Koshimizu, Mai Kadowaki, and Ayuru Ōhashi

Additionally, five albums of character image songs were released by Columbia Music Entertainment:

- Strike Witches Hime Uta Collection Sono 1 -Yoshika Miyafuji ~ Mio Sakamoto- released on March 18, 2009
- Strike Witches Hime Uta Collection Sono 2 -Sanya V. Litvyak ~ Eila Ilmatar Juutilainen- released on March 18, 2009
- Strike Witches Hime Uta Collection Sono 3 -Minna-Dietlinde Wilcke ~ Erica Hartmann ~ Gertrud Barkhorn- released on April 1, 2009
- Strike Witches Hime Uta Collection Sono 4 -Perrine-H. Clostermann ~ Lynette Bishop ~ Yoshika Miyafuji- released on April 15, 2009
- Strike Witches Hime Uta Collection Sono 5 – Francesca Lucchini ~ Charlotte E. Yeager- released on April 15, 2009

=== Video games ===
There are five games based on the Strike Witches franchise. While mainly based on the characters featured in the anime, characters from the two manga series also appear in some of the games. The first three Strike Witches games have the same opening, "private wing" by Yoko Ishida

- Strike Witches: Blitz in the Blue Sky – New Commander Struggles! (ストライクウィッチーズ -蒼空の電撃戦 新隊長 奮闘する！-, Sutoraiku Witchīzu: Sōkū no Dengekisen – Shin Taicho Funtousuru!), is a simulation game developed by Russell Games for the Nintendo DS and released on November 26, 2009. It features Junko Takei. The Witches take under their wing a candidate commanding officer from the Fuso Empire, Junko. She contacts the 501st to inform them that she will be meeting up with them during a training exercise. At the same time the military announces a new operation: to make a concerted strike against the Neuroi at the Gallian coastline and establish a new frontline base. Pre-orders for the Nintendo DS version received a fake girl's gym shorts DS pouch with their order.
- Strike Witches: What I Can Do Along With You – A Little Peaceful Days (ストライクウィッチーズ -あなたとできること A Little Peaceful Days-, Sutoraiku Witchīzu: Anata to Dekiru Koto – A Little Peaceful Days) is a visual novel title also developed by Russell Games for PlayStation 2, which was released on May 27, 2010. This adventure game features Amaki Suwa and Nishiki Nakajima. To the south of the base lies a deserted island where the Witches are conducting open-air exercises. However, when the carrier they are stationed on comes under surprise Neuroi attack, the Witches are left stranded. In the two weeks that it will take for reinforcements to arrive, the Witches decide to carry on with their maneuvers, as well as make sure they can survive.
- Strike Witches: Silver Wing (ストライクウィッチーズ 白銀の翼, Sutoraiku Witchīzu: Hakugin no Tsubasa), is a bullet hell shoot 'em up developed by Cyberfront for Xbox 360. Players control a group of three witches, and change positions to best defend against the Neuroi. And this game also features Junko Takei, with Nishiki Nakajima as a downloadable character. It was released in Japan on July 29, 2010. On June 28, 2012, it was released on PlayStation Portable. Everything in Xbox 360 version also available in PSP version.
- A fourth game, Strike Witches 2: Heal, Cure and Squish (ストライクウィッチーズ2 いやす・なおす・ぷにぷにする, Sutoraiku Witchīzu Tsu: Iyasu Naosu Punipuni suru), was developed by Kadokawa Games for Nintendo DS. The game features tactical shootouts between Witches, as well as minigames in which the players massages one of the Witches. It was released in Japan on October 21, 2010.
- An app version of the game, Strike Witches: Rondo Trails (ストライクウィッチーズ軌跡の輪舞曲, Sutoraiku Witchīzu Kiseki no Rinbukyoku), was released on Fall 2015, but the service for the app was shut down on February 28, 2018, as announced via Twitter on January 2, 2018.
- 502nd Joint Fighter Wing Brave Witches VR: Operation Baba-Yaga (第502統合戦闘航空団 ブレイブウィッチーズ VR-Operation Baba_yaga-雪中迎撃戦, 502nd Joint Fighter Wing Brave Witches VR- Operation Baba-Yaga- Snow Interception Battle) was a VR game based on the Brave Witches anime. It was released for the PC and PlayStation 4 in Japan on 9 June, 2017.
- World Witches United Front (ワールドウィッチーズ UNITED FRONT, Wārudou Witchīzu UNITED FRONT) was developed by Cave for Android and iOS. The game was released in Japan on October 13, 2020.

== Reception ==
John Oppliger of AnimeNation listed Strike Witches as one of the best girls with guns anime series, stating that "its numerous shooting scenes and its stellar action scene animation qualify it for recognition as one of anime's outstanding girls with guns shows."
