= Arcanadea =

Japanese plastic model series

アルカナディア (Arukanadia)
- Genre: Science fantasy
- Created by: Kotobukiya
- Manga

Arcanadea: Burning Bright!
- Written by: Kotobukiya
- Illustrated by: Jako
- Original run: June 10, 2026 – present
- Manga

Arcanadea: Cross Connect
- Written by: Kotobukiya
- Illustrated by: Vivion
- Published by: Vivion
- Magazine: Comipo Comics
- Original run: August 14, 2026 – present
- Anime television series
- Directed by: Keiichiro Kawaguchi
- Written by: Atsuhiro Tomioka
- Music by: Yuki Hayashi; Yuki Furuhashi
- Studio: Yokohama Animation Laboratory
- Original network: ANN (TV Asahi), BS Asahi
- Original run: January 2027 – scheduled

Arcanadea (Japanese: アルカナディア, Hepburn: Arukanadia) is a Japanese series of heavily customizable fantasy model kits created and produced by Kotobukiya, released since December 2021, with necömi as the lead character designer.

Compared to Kotobukiya's other bishoujo kit lines, which are more themed after Mecha Musume, the line is more themed around fantasy themes such as demi-humans and monster musume (monster girls) as its core appeal.

The concept was brought about by imagining a fantasy VRMMO game, of which the various characters inhabit.

An anime television series adaptation produced by Yokohama Animation Laboratory is set to premiere in January 2027.

== Characters ==
Lumitea (ルミティア, Rumitia)
Voiced by: Kaede Hondo
Race: Angel
Velretta (ヴェルルッタ, Vuerurutta)
Voiced by: Miho Okasaki
Race: Demonkin
Yukumo (ユクモ)
Voiced by: Rina Hidaka
Race: Kitsune
Elena (エレーナ, Erēna)
Voiced by: Fairouz Ai
Race: Centaur
Soffiera (ソフィエラ, Sofiera)
Voiced by: Ai Kakuma
Race: Demon
Ermeda (エルメダ, Erumeda)
Voiced by: M.A.O
Race: Seraphim
Charmed (シャルメド, Sharumedo)
Race: HellHound
Meltina (メルティーナ)
Voiced by: Yuki Kuwahara
Race: Lamia
Ghi (ギィ, Gyi)
Voiced by: Moka Kanzaki
Shōgo Kuga (空閑翔吾, Kuga Shōgo)
Voiced by: Nobunaga Shimazaki
Kaho Asagi (浅黄香穂, Asagi Kaho)
Voiced by: Konomi Inagaki
Rin Kirinoue (桐乃上凛, Kirinoue Rin)
Voiced by: Mai Kanno

== Other media ==
=== Manga ===
Two spin-off manga series were released online; the first spin-off illustrated by Jako, titled Arcanadea: Burning Bright!, began serialization on the series' official website on June 10, 2026, while the second spin-off, titled Arcanadea: Cross Connect, began serialization under Vivion's Comipo Comics label on August 14 of the same year.

=== Anime ===
An anime television series adaptation was announced during a livestream event for the plastic model series on December 20, 2024. The series will be produced by Yokohama Animation Laboratory and directed by Keiichiro Kawaguchi, with series composition handled by Atsuhiro Tomioka, characters designed by Kumoha Arakawa, and music composed by Yuki Hayashi and Yuki Furuhashi. It is set to premiere in January 2027 on the NUMAnimation programming block on TV Asahi and its affiliates.

== See also ==
- Alice Gear Aegis
- Busou Shinki
- Frame Arms Girl, another plastic model series created by Kotobukiya
- Hundred
- Infinite Stratos
- Little Battlers Experience
- Symphogear
