= Azur Lane: Slow Ahead! =

Japanese manga series

- Cover art of the first volume

アズールレーン びそくぜんしんっ！ (Azūru Rēn Bisoku Zenshin!)
- Genre: Action, military
- Created by: Shanghai Manjuu; Xiamen Yongshi
- Manga
- Written by: Hori
- Published by: Ichijinsha
- Magazine: Manga 4-koma Palette
- Original run: March 2, 2018 – present
- Volumes: 6
- Anime television series
- Directed by: Masato Jinbo (S1); Shunji Maki (S2)
- Written by: Yū Satō; Hotaru Asafuji (S2)
- Music by: Shade (S1); Fūga Hatori (S2)
- Studio: Candy Box; Yostar Pictures (S1)
- Licensed by: Crunchyroll
- Original network: Tokyo MX, BS11 (S1-2); AT-X (S1)
- Original run: January 12, 2021 – September 21, 2026
- Episodes: 24 + 1 OVA
- icon

Azur Lane: Slow Ahead! (Japanese: アズールレーン びそくぜんしんっ！, Hepburn: Azūru Rēn Bisoku Zenshin!) is a Japanese four-panel manga series written and illustrated by Hori. It is based on the Chinese side-scrolling shoot 'em up video game Azur Lane by Shanghai Manjuu and Xiamen Yongshi. The series has been published in Ichijinsha's Manga 4-koma Palette magazine since March 2018. An anime television series adaptation produced by Candy Box and Yostar Pictures aired from January to March 2021. A second season produced solely by Candy Box aired from July to September 2026.

== Plot ==
In Azur Lane, the characters are moe anthropomorphic interpretations of World War II battleships where various groups institute an academy for these girls.

== Characters ==
Javelin
Voiced by: Nozomi Yamane
Ayanami
Voiced by: Yō Taichi
Laffey
Voiced by: Maria Naganawa
Z23
Voiced by: Rika Abe
Akashi
Voiced by: Sumire Uesaka
Baltimore
Voiced by: Minami Takahashi
Prinz Eugen
Voiced by: Ayane Sakura

== Media ==
=== Manga ===
Written and illustrated by Hori, Azur Lane: Slow Ahead! is published in Ichijinsha's magazine Manga 4-koma Palette. It features the starter characters based on HMS Javelin, IJN Ayanami, USS Laffey and KMS Z23.

No.	Release date	ISBN
1	June 27, 2019	9784758083256
2	December 11, 2020	9784758083560
3	October 21, 2021	9784758083751
4	June 27, 2023	9784758084475
5	September 27, 2025	9784758088077
6	August 27, 2026	9784825100916

=== Anime ===
An anime adaptation was announced on December 24, 2019. It is directed by Masato Jinbo and written by Yū Satō at Yostar Pictures and Candy Box (alongside Yokohama Animation Laboratory credited for production cooperation), with Hiromitsu Hagiwara designing the characters, and Shade composing the series' music. The series aired from January 12 to March 30, 2021, on Tokyo MX and other networks. (Note: Tokyo MX and BS11 listed the series premiere on January 11 at 25:00, which is effectively January 12 at 1:00 a.m. JST.) The opening theme song is "Longing for!" performed by Emi Nitta, while the ending theme song is "Midday-Color Siesta" (まひるいろシエスタ, "Mahiru-iro Shiesuta") performed by Yui Sakakibara. Crunchyroll streamed the series. An original video animation (OVA) episode is bundle with the second Blu-ray volume, which was released on July 7, 2021.

A second season was announced at the "Azur Lane 6th Anniversary Fes." event on September 10, 2023. The season is directed by Shunji Maki and written by Satō and Hotaru Asafuji at Candy Box, with Nana Mori designing the characters, and Fūga Hatori composing the series' music. The season aired from July 6 to September 21, 2026. (Note: BS11 listed the season premiere on July 5 at 25:00, which is effectively July 6 at 1:00 a.m. JST.) The first theme song is "Shaisuma—!" (しゃいすまっ！) performed by Yui Sakakibara, while the second theme song is "Lu lu lun♪ ~Urahara Kibun wa Automatic" (Lu lu lun♪～ウラハラ気分はオートマティック～) performed by Miyuki Hashimoto.

==== Season 1 (2021) ====
No. overall	No. in season	Title	Directed by (Note: Production staff information is taken from the ending credits of each episode.)	Written by	Original release date
1	1	"Port and Starboard, Slow Ahead!"; Transliteration: "Ryōgen, Bisoku Zenshin!" (Japanese: 両舷、びそくぜんしんっ！)	Masato Jinbo	Yū Satō	January 12, 2021 (Note: Episode 1 and 2 were included as a bonus in the special edition of the volume 2 of the manga on December 11, 2020.)
Three ship girls, Javelin, Ayanami, and Laffey were almost late as they arrived in school, while Z23 also arrived as a substitute class advisor. After having a normal time in the classroom, apart from Laffey's constant attempts to stay awake, the four girls, Z23 included, ate together at lunch and they all decided to sleep with Laffey in her dorm room. While there, the three decided to do pillow fights before bedtime until Laffey inadvertently throws her pillow at Z23, who had just came in.
2	2	"You Need Something Sweet After a Workout..."; Transliteration: "Undō no Ato wa, Amai Mono..." (Japanese: 運動の後は、甘いもの...)	Masaoki Nakajima	Yū Satō	January 19, 2021
Javelin, Ayanami, Laffey & Z23 offers to help Baltimore for her basketball and volleyball club activities because of her overlapping schedules. After becoming exhausted for their work, they make several kinds of chocolates with Prinz Eugen and ate some together as a reward.
3	3	"Is Real Life a God Tier Game?"; Transliteration: "Riaru wa Kamigē Nan Desu?" (Japanese: リアルは神ゲーなんです？)	Toshiya Niidome	Yū Satō	January 26, 2021
With Ayanami's addiction to video games started to have a noticeable effect on Z23's class, she, and Javelin decided to set out and enlist the help of a Meowfficer from Akashi to help Ayanami with her game and restore order.
4	4	"Beach Time Is Barbecue Time!"; Transliteration: "Umibe to Ieba Bābekyū yo ne!" (Japanese: 海辺といえばバーベキューよね！)	Takahiro Hirata	Yū Satō	February 2, 2021
The four protagonists (Laffey, Javelin, Ayanami, and Z23) scour around to find ingredients for the barbecue after Rodney blows up the watermelon, along with their food. Minneapolis also appears and assists when they encounter one of her traps.
5	5	"With Friends, With Someone Special"; Transliteration: "Tomodachi to, Taisetsu na Hito to" (Japanese: トモダチと、⼤切な⼈と)	Masato Kitagawa	Yū Satō	February 9, 2021
Admiral Graf Spee has some struggle in trying to socialize with other shipgirls from different factions until she met and befriended Ayanami. While eating sweets made by Dunkerque, Laffey, Javelin, Ayanami, and Z23 talked about what to do on their next break.
6	6	"May I Have This Dance?"; Transliteration: "Issho ni Odotte mo Ii Desu?" (Japanese: ⼀緒に踊ってもいいです？)	Takahiro Hirata	Yū Satō	February 16, 2021
Javelin and the other shipgirls offers help with Bismarck on how to ask Tirpitz out on a dance. Javelin becomes nervous about her first-time experience in the ballroom party, which also includes Formidable.
7	7	"Pay Close Attention to Keeping Things Neat and Tidy!"; Transliteration: "Seiri Seiton, Yōchūi!" (Japanese: 整理整頓、要注意！)	Hiroshi Hara	Yū Satō	February 23, 2021
Taihou and Mikasa join the four protagonist shipgirls in cleaning up the Commander's office, but Taihou attempts to use the opportunity to gather information on the Commander and steal the key.
8	8	"Enjoying the Fair With Everyone!"; Transliteration: "Minna de Waiwai Omatsuri!" (Japanese: みんなでワイワイお祭り！)	Masataka Nishikawa	Yū Satō	March 2, 2021
The four protagonist shipgirls attend the academy's first ever costume fair and don costumes themselves after encountering North Carolina dressed as a bunny girl. They also encounter Washington, also dressed as a bunny girl, and Honolulu, who is nervous about wearing a revealing yukata that St. Louis gave to her.
9	9	"Maid, At Your Service!"; Transliteration: "Meido no Go-hōshi, Desu" (Japanese: メイドのご奉仕、です)	Kyōryoku Tamae	Yū Satō	March 9, 2021
Belfast is teaching a younger version of herself, Little Bel, on what is needed to be a proper Royal Maid like her. It begins with serving tea when the four protagonist shipgirls appear and are invited to be guests, leading Little Bel to do what she can to help her friends beyond just entertaining them or helping them clean up.
10	10	"Balmy, Hot, Dizzy..."; Transliteration: "Pokapoka Atsuatsu Furafura..." (Japanese: ポカポカアツアツフラフラ...)	Ken Takahashi	Yū Satō	March 16, 2021
The four protagonist shipgirls help Shoukaku and Zuikaku set up a Japanese-style open air hot spring so they can bathe after the base's boiler malfunctions.
11	11	"A Fun Amusement Park Outing?"; Transliteration: "Tanoshii Yūenchi Hapuningu?!" (Japanese: 楽しい遊園地ハプニング？！)	Motohiro Abe	Yū Satō	March 23, 2021
The four protagonist shipgirls, along with Yukikaze, Mutsu, and Nagato, spend their time to have fun with various activities at Manjuu Land amusement park.
12	12	"Friends Are Our Most Important Treasure"; Transliteration: "Taisetsu na Takaramono, Sore ga Nakama-tachi" (Japanese: 大切な宝物、それが仲間たち)	Masato Jinbo	Yū Satō	March 30, 2021
Upon discovering Laffey has seemingly developed amnesia because of the treasure jewels inside the chest, Javelin, Z23, and Ayanami tried to restore Laffey's memories by having her to sleep on the chests of several shipgirls; such as Formidable, Belfast, Honolulu, Baltimore, and Minneapolis, eventually revealing in the end that she was half-asleep the whole time.
OVA	OVA	"A Party at the Grand Base"; Transliteration: "Hokorashiki Bokō ni Shukusai o" (Japanese: 誇らしき母港に祝祭を)	Shigetaka Ikeda	Yū Satō	July 7, 2021
The four protagonist shipgirls discover there is another party scheduled to take place tomorrow night at a basketball court and they head there to practice. They discover Sirius still trying to practice to serve for her commander, but was hindered due to her clumsiness despite assistance. They encounter South Dakota and Massachusetts, who are in a similar situation as Sirius' as they are practicing for the piano duet. By tomorrow night, the grand party is at full swing.

==== Season 2 (2026) ====
No. overall	No. in season	Title	Directed by	Written by	Original release date
13	1	"Onwards to Adventure!"; Transliteration: "Bōken no Tabi ni Shi Yuppa tsu!" (Japanese: 冒険の旅にしゅっぱーつ！)	Unknown	Unknown	July 6, 2026
