= Keiichiro Kawaguchi =

Japanese animator and director

Keiichiro Kawaguchi (川口 敬一郎, Kawaguchi Keiichirō; born January 22) is a Japanese animator and director born in Kawasaki, Kanagawa.

== Life and career ==
Kawaguchi got his start at Ashi Productions and has worked as a key animator and animation director, as well as episode director for many projects. In recent years, he has worked as a sound director and screenwriter for some of the works. Initially, the OVA Pinky:St was supposed to be his first directorial work, but due to production delays, the TV series MÄR was aired before it, resulting in it being his first directorial work instead.

== Personal life ==
Kawaguchi is regarded as a quick worker and often directs two or three projects at a time. He also does much of the storyboarding himself. He enjoys collecting figurines and character goods, and his work desk is crammed with toys. He got into the anime industry because he dreamed of working on plastic models and toyetic anime.

== Filmography ==
=== TV series ===
- MÄR (2006–2007) - Director (eps 53-102)
- Moetan (2007) - Director
- Getsumento Heiki Mina (2007) - Director
- Hayate the Combat Butler (2007–2008) - Director
- Psychic Squad (2008–2009) - Director
- Nyan Koi! (2009) - Director
- Sket Dance (2011–2012) - Director
- Mayo Chiki! (2011) - Director
- OniAi (2012) - Director
- Minami-ke: Tadaima (2013) - Director
- Dragon Collection (2014–2015) - Director
- Jinsei (2014) - Director
- Million Doll (2015) - Director
- Phantasy Star Online 2: The Animation (2016) - Director
- Please Tell Me! Galko-chan (2016) - Director, Series Composition
- Nurse Witch Komugi R (2016) - Director
- Frame Arms Girl (2017) - Director
- Island (2018) - Director
- Mr. Tonegawa: Middle Management Blues (2018) - Director
- Shadowverse (2020–2021) - Director
- Higurashi: When They Cry – Gou (2020–2021) - Director
- Dropout Idol Fruit Tart (2020) - Director, Series Composition
- Higurashi: When They Cry – Sotsu (2021) - Director
- Shadowverse Flame (2022) - Director
- The Prince of Tennis II: U-17 World Cup (2022) - Director
- Spy Classroom (2023) - Director
- Classroom for Heroes (2023) - Director
- The Red Ranger Becomes an Adventurer in Another World (2025) - Director
- Welcome to Demon School! Iruma-kun: IruMafia Edition (2027) - Director
- Arcanadea (2027) - Director

=== OVAs/ONAs ===
- Pinky:St (2006) - Director
- The Idolmaster Live For You! (2008) - Director
- Kowarekake no Orgel (2009) - Director
- Yutori-chan (2009–2010) - Director
- Psychic Squad (2010) - Director
- Princess Resurrection (2010–2011) - Director
- Mei-elle Otoko no Ko (2010) - Director
- Kantan Pacemaker Nyūmon (2010) - Director
- Minami-ke: Omatase (2012) - Director
- Rescue Me! (2013) - Director
- Minami-ke: Natsuyasumi (2013) - Director
- The Prince of Tennis: Best Games!! (2018–present) - Director
- The Prince of Tennis: Hyotei vs. Rikkai Game of Future (2021) - Director

=== Films ===
- Kowarekake no Orgel (2010) - Director
- Hunter × Hunter: The Last Mission (2013) - Director
- Frame Arms Girl: Kyakkyau Fufu na Wonderland (2019) - Director

== See also ==
- Keiichiro Kawaguchi at Anime News Network's encyclopedia
