= Alice Gear Aegis =

Japanese mobile game and its media franchise

アリス・ギア・アイギス (Arisu Gia Aigisu)
- Genre: Mecha
- Video game
- Developer: Pyramid
- Publisher: Colopl
- Music by: Zuntata
- Genre: Action
- Platform: iOS; Android; PC
- Released: January 22, 2018
- Original video animation

Alice Gear Aegis: Heart Pounding! Actress Packed Mermaid Grand Prix!
- Directed by: Hirokazu Hanai
- Written by: Masahiro Okubo
- Music by: Zuntata
- Studio: Nomad
- Licensed by: Sentai Filmworks
- Released: September 15, 2021
- Runtime: 20 minutes
- Video game

Alice Gear Aegis CS: Concerto of Simulatrix
- Developer: Pyramid
- Publisher: JP: Mages; WW: PQube; AS: Sega
- Music by: Zuntata
- Genre: Action, Fighting game
- Platform: Nintendo Switch; PlayStation 4; PlayStation 5
- Released: JP: September 8, 2022; WW: March 16, 2023
- Anime television series

Alice Gear Aegis Expansion
- Directed by: Hirokazu Hanai
- Written by: Kenji Sugihara
- Music by: Kazuma Jinnouchi; Nobuko Toda
- Studio: Nomad
- Licensed by: Sentai Filmworks: SA/SEA: Medialink
- Original network: Tokyo MX, MBS, BS11, AT-X
- Original run: April 4, 2023 – June 20, 2023
- Episodes: 12
- icon

Alice Gear Aegis (Note: Japanese: アリス・ギア・アイギス, Hepburn: Arisu Gia Aigisu) is a Japanese mobile game developed by Pyramid and published by Colopl. It was released in 2018.

A console spin-off of the mobile game, titled Alice Gear Aegis CS: Concerto of Simulatrix, was released by Mages for the Nintendo Switch, PlayStation 4, and PlayStation 5 in September 2022 in Japan, followed by a worldwide release in March 2023.

The game received an original video animation by Nomad in September 2021. An anime television spin-off, also by Nomad, aired from April to June 2023.

== Media ==
=== Mobile game ===
The game was first announced on July 25, 2017; it was also announced to be developed by Pyramid and published by Colopl, with character designs from Fumikane Shimada, mech designs from Kanetake Ebikawa and Takayuki Yanase, and music written by Zuntata. The game released on January 22, 2018, on iOS and Android. The game was released on PC on June 4, 2019.

=== Console game ===
Alice Gear Aegis CS: Concerto of Simulatrix, a bullet hell fighting game, was released in Japan by Mages on September 8, 2022, for the Nintendo Switch, PlayStation 4 and PlayStation 5. Published by PQube, a worldwide launch on the same systems released on March 16, 2023, release.

=== Anime ===
In October 2020, it was announced that the game would be receiving an original video animation (OVA) adaptation. The OVA, titled Alice Gear Aegis: Heart Pounding! Actress Packed Mermaid Grand Prix!, was produced by Nomad and directed by Hirokazu Hanai, with Rikiya Okano designing the characters, Masahiro Okubo writing the scripts, and Zuntata composing the music. It was released on September 15, 2021. Sentai Filmworks began streaming the OVA on Hidive on March 29, 2023.

In January 2022, an anime television series adaptation of the game was announced. Nomad, Hirokazu Hanai, and Rikiya Okano all reprised their roles from the OVA as producer, director, and character designer respectively. However, Kenji Sugihara replaced Okubo as script writer. The series, titled Alice Gear Aegis Expansion, aired from April 4 to June 20, 2023, on Tokyo MX and other networks. (Note: Tokyo MX listed the season premiere at 25:05 on April 3, 2023, which is April 4 at 1:05 a.m. JST.) The opening theme song is "Dash and Go!" by Aina Suzuki, while the ending theme song is "Just a little bit" by Marina Horiuchi.

Sentai Filmworks licensed the series in North America, and streamed it on Hidive. Medialink licensed the series in Asia-Pacific and Oceania (except Australia and New Zealand), and streamed on the Ani-One Asia/Thailand YouTube channels; as well as Bilibili in Southeast Asia; Catchplay+ in Indonesia, Singapore and Taiwan and MeWATCH in Singapore.

No.	Title	Directed by (Note: Information is taken from the ending credits of each episode.)	Written by	Storyboarded by	Original release date
OVA	"Heart Pounding! Actress Packed Mermaid Grand Prix!"; Transliteration: "Doki! Akutoresu Darake no Māmeido Guranpuri" (Japanese: ドキッ！アクトレスだらけのマーメイドグランプリ♡)	Hirokazu Hanai	Masahiro Okubo; Hirokazu Hanai	Hirokazu Hanai	September 15, 2021
1	"Farewell, Narikozaka Manufacturing!"; Transliteration: "Saraba Narikozaka Seisakusho!" (Japanese: さらば成子坂製作所！)	Hirokazu Hanai	Kenji Sugihara	Hirokazu Hanai	April 4, 2023
2	"Actresses VS Maintenance Crew!"; Transliteration: "Akutoresu Buiesu Seibi-bu!" (Japanese: アクトレスVS整備部！)	Yūma Suzuki	Kenji Sugihara	Hirokazu Hanai	April 11, 2023
2	"Welcome to the Actress Cafe!"; Transliteration: "Akutoresu Kafe e Yōkoso!" (Japanese: アクトレスカフェへようこそ！)	Yūma Suzuki	Kenji Sugihara	Hirokazu Hanai	April 11, 2023
3	"The Narikozaka Nightmare!"; Transliteration: "Narikozaka no Akumu!" (Japanese: 成子坂の悪夢！)	Yoshiyuki Kumeda; Kōichirō Kuroda	Yasunori Yamada	Hiroyuki Yamada	April 18, 2023
3	"Ninpuu Raiya Gaiden!"; Transliteration: "Ninpū Raiya Gaiden!" (Japanese: 忍風来弥外伝！)	Yoshiyuki Kumeda; Kōichirō Kuroda	Yasunori Yamada	Hiroyuki Yamada	April 18, 2023
4	"Festival Revelry! Narikozaka! (Preparations)"; Transliteration: "Omatsuri Sawagi da yo! Narikozaka! (Junbi-hen)" (Japanese: お祭り騒ぎだヨ！成子坂！（準備編）)	Yūri Hagiwara; Susumu Yamamoto	Shirō Gohongi	Akira Nishimori	April 25, 2023
4	"Festival Revelry! Narikozaka! (The Event)"; Transliteration: "Omatsuri Sawagi da yo! Narikozaka! (Tōjitsu-hen)" (Japanese: お祭り騒ぎだヨ！成子坂！（当日編）)	Yūri Hagiwara; Susumu Yamamoto	Shirō Gohongi	Akira Nishimori	April 25, 2023
5	"Terrifying Hiking?!"; Transliteration: "Kyōfu no Haikingu!?" (Japanese: 恐怖のハイキング！？)	Yūichi Satō	Kenji Sugihara	Hiroyuki Yamada	May 2, 2023
5	"Fight on, Vapor Haze?!"; Transliteration: "Tatakae Veipā Heizu!?" (Japanese: 戦えヴェイパーヘイズ！？)	Yūichi Satō	Kenji Sugihara	Hiroyuki Yamada	May 2, 2023
6	"The Touka Shimoochiai Murder Case (Shitara Chapter)"; Transliteration: "Shimoochiai Tōka Satsujin Jiken ~Shitara-hen~" (Japanese: 下落合桃歌殺人事件 ～シタラ編～)	Masateru Inada	Yasunori Yamada	Akira Nishimori	May 9, 2023
6	"The Touka Shimoochiai Murder Case (Yotsuyu Chapter)"; Transliteration: "Shimoochiai Tōka Satsujin Jiken ~Yotsuyu-hen~" (Japanese: 下落合桃歌殺人事件 ～夜露編～)	Masateru Inada	Yasunori Yamada	Akira Nishimori	May 9, 2023
7	"Yotsuyu-sama's a Former Delinquent?!"; Transliteration: "Yotsuyu-sama wa Moto Yan!?" (Japanese: 夜露様は元ヤン！？)	Yūma Suzuki	Yasunori Yamada	Yūma Suzuki	May 16, 2023
7	"Life for the Maintenance Crew!"; Transliteration: "Seibi-bu no Nichijō!" (Japanese: 整備部の日常！)	Yūma Suzuki	Yasunori Yamada	Yūma Suzuki	May 16, 2023
8	"Nodoka in Wonderland"; Transliteration: "Fushigi no Kuni no Nodoka" (Japanese: 不思議の国ののどか)	Tomonori Mine	Kenji Sugihara	Tomonori Mine	May 23, 2023
8	"Narikozaka a La Carte"; Transliteration: "Narikozaka Arakaruto" (Japanese: 成子坂アラカルト)	Tomonori Mine	Kenji Sugihara	Tomonori Mine	May 23, 2023
9	"Rin-chan Expedition Party Mystery! Search for the Legendary Sasshie!"; Transliteration: "Rin-chan Tankentai Shinpi! Maboroshi no Sasshī o Sagase!" (Japanese: リンちゃん探検隊 神秘！幻のサッシーを探せ！)	Yūta Suzuki	Yasunori Yamada	Hiroyuki Yamada	May 30, 2023
9	"Fluff: The Terrifying Invader"; Transliteration: "Mofu ~Kyōfu no Shinryaku Seibutsu~" (Japanese: MOFU ～恐怖の侵略生物～)	Yūta Suzuki	Yasunori Yamada	Hiroyuki Yamada	May 30, 2023
10	"It's a Vacation to the South, Narikozaka! (Vacation)"; Transliteration: "Nangoku Bakansu da yo! Narikozaka! (Bakansu-hen)" (Japanese: 南国バカンスだヨ！成子坂！（バカンス編）)	Yoshiyuki Kumeda	Yasunori Yamada	Shinpei Nagai	June 6, 2023
10	"It's a Vacation to the South, Narikozaka! (Contest)"; Transliteration: "Nangoku Bakansu da yo! Narikozaka! (Kontesuto-hen)" (Japanese: 南国バカンスだヨ！成子坂！（コンテスト編）)	Yoshiyuki Kumeda	Yasunori Yamada	Shinpei Nagai	June 6, 2023
11	"Rain"; Transliteration: "Ame" (Japanese: 雨)	Sumio Watanabe	Shirō Gohongi	Akira Nishimori	June 13, 2023
12	"Farewell, Nodoka Takahata!"; Transliteration: "Saraba Takahata Nodoka!" (Japanese: さらば高幡のどか！)	Hirokazu Hanai	Kenji Sugihara	Hirokazu Hanai	June 20, 2023

== Reception ==
The Alice Gear Aegis Expansion anime adaptation received mixed reviews. Alex Henderson of Anime Feminist reviewed the first episode, stating the world of fighting aliens in space seems "unrelated to the cutesy character storyline" which comprises the premiere, and called it "very silly" because the lore and tone, in Henderson's view, are "so at odds" with one another, with a refusal to engage with the sci-fi premise.

== See also ==
- Arcanadea
- Busou Shinki
- Frame Arms Girl
- Hundred
- Infinite Stratos
- Little Battlers Experience
- Symphogear
