= Frame Arms Girl =

Japanese model kit line & its adaptations

- Cover of the first Japanese Frame Arms Girl: Lab Days manga volume featuring Gourai.

フレームアームズ・ガール (Furēmu Āmuzu Gāru)
- Created by: Kotobukiya
- Manga

Frame Arms Girl: Lab Days
- Written by: Kotobukiya; Deko Akao (assistant supervisor)
- Illustrated by: Tsuneo Tsuneishi
- Published by: Kadokawa Shoten
- Imprint: Kadokawa Comics Ace
- Magazine: Comp Ace
- Original run: December 26, 2016 – November 25, 2017
- Volumes: 2
- Anime television series
- Directed by: Keiichiro Kawaguchi
- Produced by: Hiroaki Taneoka
- Written by: Deko Akao
- Music by: Keigo Hoashi; Kakeru Ishihama
- Studio: Zexcs; Studio A-Cat
- Licensed by: NA: Sentai Filmworks
- Original network: Tokyo MX, BS11, AT-X
- Original run: April 3, 2017 – June 19, 2017
- Episodes: 12
- Anime film

Frame Arms Girl: Kyakkyau Fufu na Wonderland
- Directed by: Keiichiro Kawaguchi
- Written by: Deko Akao
- Music by: Keigo Hoashi; Kakeru Ishihama
- Studio: Zexcs; Studio A-Cat
- Released: June 29, 2019
- Runtime: 82 minutes

Frame Arms Girl (Japanese: フレームアームズ・ガール, Hepburn: Furēmu Āmuzu Gāru) is a series of heavily customizable model kit girls produced by Kotobukiya, originally released in 2015 as a moé reimagining of the more traditional, equally customizable Frame Arms mecha line and acts as a sister series to the Megami Device line of more traditional, non-derivative mecha musume kits, of which the line has regularly crossed over with.

A prequel manga for the anime by Tsuneo Tsuneishi began serialization in Kadokawa Shoten's Comp Ace magazine in December 2016. An anime television series inspired by the line aired from April 3, 2017, to June 19, 2017. A recap film Frame Arms Girl: Kyakkyau Fufu na Wonderland was released on June 29, 2019.

== Summary ==
Based on the original Frame Arms line, Frame Arms Girl features the robots from that line re-portrayed as anthropomorphic mecha musume, known as F.A. Girls for short, who can be equipped with various armor and weapon parts, including mixing and matching those from other original Kotobukiya kit lines, Frame Arms and the M.S.G accessory series included. The result resembles a doll or figure with accessories attached, ranging from heavy armaments to articles of clothing, sold at the size of 1/1 scale for lore purposes, but translate to 1/10 by default and 1/24 scale for handscale versions when compared to the human body. The line's initial character design was illustrated by Fumikane Shimada, loosely inspired by Takayuki Yanase original Frame Arms mecha designs, but has since expanded to commission other artists to help on new F.A. Girls.

== Multimedia Storyline ==
=== Characters ===
The following is a description of characters and their personalities that appeared in the anime and manga as opposed to their respective real life kits' instruction manuals.

Gennai Ao (源内 あお)
Voiced by: Yoko Hikasa
A human girl who is given the job of providing data for the F.A. Girls by Factory Advance. Because her parents have business overseas, she lives alone in her apartment. As more F.A. Girls are sent to her, she slowly begins accepting them as a family.
Gourai (轟雷, Gōrai)
Voiced by: Narumi Kaho
An F.A. Girl who is sent to Ao to gather emotion data. She is a ground-based fighter who can move quickly with tank-style treads, but has a disadvantage over aerial types. It is revealed that there are many copies of her sent out to different people around the city, but Ao's is the only one that is active. She is the first F.A. Girl that Ao receives.
Stylet (スティレット, Suteiretto)
Voiced by: Yu Ayase
A bossy F.A. Girl who gets flustered easily. Equipped with wings, she specializes in aerial combat. Ao nicknames her Sty-ko. She and Baselard are sent to Ao's apartment shortly after Gourai.
Baselard (バーゼラルド, Bāzerarudo)
Voiced by: Rika Nagae
An energetic and childish F.A. Girl who likes to cause mischief. Like Stylet, she is an aerial type who focuses on guided laser weapons. She and Stylet are sent to Ao's apartment shortly after Gourai.
Materia Sisters (マテリア姉妹, Materia Shimai)
Voiced by: Erii Yamazaki
A pair of F.A. Girls who have the same model and can be considered as sisters, given the names White (シロ, Shiro) and Black (クロ, Kuro) to distinguish from each other. They are oddly affectionate towards each other and take pleasure in torturing others, often omitting the use of armor in favor of powerful weaponry. Ao receives them sometime after getting Gourai, Stylet, and Baselard.
Architect (アーキテクト, Ākitekuto)
Voiced by: Hibiku Yamamura
An F.A. girl who, along with the Materia Sisters, is the basis of every other F.A. Girl and, according to Stylet, has no physical body and only manifests herself during certain battles to carry out her programming. She was given a physical body after Gourai and Jinrai defeated her, loaded with the data generated during their battle. She shows very little emotion compared to the other F.A. Girls, and has the ability to alter her appearance in battle. She is the seventh F.A. Girl that Ao receives.
Jinrai (迅雷, Jinrai)
Voiced by: Minami Kabayama
A proud and traditionalist F.A. Girl who has a particularly obsession with the Sengoku period and specializes in ninja techniques. She is the sixth F.A. Girl that Ao receives.
Hresvelgr (フレズヴェルク, Furezuveruku)
Voiced by: Rika Abe
A powerful F.A. Girl who gave Gourai her first defeat, causing Gourai to improve further. Ao nicknames her Hres. She is arrogant, a little antagonistic, and loves to battle. Factory Advance later provides her with an upgrade that alters her appearance, but this unintentionally corrupts her. After Gourai defeats her, she is freed from her corruptive state and is allowed to stay with Ao, developing a much nicer personality afterwards. She is the last F.A. Girl that Ao receives.
Kotobuki Bukiko (寿 武希子)
Voiced by: Kanomi Izawa
Ao's best friend, who is obsessed with model kits and often provides Ao with the latest parts after finding out about the F.A. Girls. She is also a moé reimagining of Kotobukiya, the real-life company behind Frame Arms Girls.
Guriko
A mysterious girl that Ao meets at the park that she used to visit when she was a child, who guides Ao to a time capsule that she buried there. She disappears afterwards. A doll version of her is found inside of the time capsule, which implies that she is a vision from Ao's past.
Jyuden-kun
Every F.A. Girl is accompanied by these small robots who are tasked with recharging them and preparing them for battles. They can also act as a chair or as a bed for them, and can serve as a communication device.
Sleipni-taro
It was originally a cleaning robot that experiences malfunctions. After it was repaired, the robot was also given an upgrade as well as artificial intelligence. It usually serves as a means of transportation for the F.A. Girls and as a rideable toy by Baselard.
Nipako
Godhand's mascot. In the show, she cameos as a nipper tsukumogami who haunts Ao's school after a girl misused a pair of plastic cutting nippers on metal, being the GodHand SPN-120 Ultimate, a nipper regarded as a glass cannon for its highest quality cuts in the plamo hobby and highest level of fragility on misuse. Nipako haunts the school at night, possessing the very same nippers that broke. After cutting off an unneeded fragment that was to be cleaned from Gourai's armor, the nippers return to normal and is taken back to Ao's place as a souvenir while Nipako watches them with happiness, implying that she is now at peace knowing that she will be handled with care in the future.
Innocentia
A newly developed F.A. Girl who was teased at the end of the final episode. Her abilities and future remain unknown and she is unvoiced within the anime.

=== Manga ===
A manga prequel written by Kotobukiya and illustrated by Tsuneo Tsuneishi, titled Frame Arms Girl: Lab Days (フレームアームズ・ガール ラボ・デイズ, Frēmu Āmuzu Gāru: Rabo Deizu), began serialization in Kadokawa Shoten's Comp Ace magazine from December 26, 2016.

=== Anime ===
A 12-episode anime television adaption aired on Tokyo MX between April 3, 2017, and June 19, 2017, also airing on BS11 and AT-X. The anime was directed by Keiichiro Kawaguchi at studios Zexcs and Studio A-Cat with scripts written by Deko Akao and the music is produced by Keigo Hoashi and Kakeru Ishihama. Sentai Filmworks have licensed it for home video and digital release. The series was streamed by the Anime Network. The opening theme is "Tiny Tiny" by Rie Murakawa while the ending theme is "Fullscratch Love", performed by the series' voice actresses.

The anime follows a girl named Ao who is sent a prototype F.A. Girl known as Gourai and is tasked with helping her gather data on both battle and emotions. The two soon encounter more F.A. Girls sent by Factory Advance, the company who created them, who Gourai battles against while also having various adventures alongside. Any F.A. Girls that Gourai defeats are allowed to stay with her and Ao.

A film titled Frame Arms Girl: Kyakkyau Fufu na Wonderland has been announced. It was revealed that the film will be a compilation film with new added footage. The film premiered on June 29, 2019.

No.	Title (Note: All English titles are taken from Anime Network.)	Original air date
1	"Gourai"; Transliteration: "Gōrai" (Japanese: 轟雷)	April 3, 2017
1	"Stylet and Baselard"; Transliteration: "Sutiretto to Bāzerarudo" (Japanese: スティレットとバーゼラルド)	April 3, 2017
One day, a girl named Gennai Ao receives a package, believed to have been sent by her father, containing a small robot girl named Gourai. Revealing herself to be a Frame Arms Girl installed with an artificial intelligence, Gourai explains how she was sent to Ao to gather data on emotions. She helps Gourai assemble her armor, but loses one part, which is soon discovered to have fallen into her clothes. As Ao is about to head to school, two more F.A. Girls named Stylet and Baselard are sent to her apartment; the reason why they are here is because Ao's Gourai is the only prototype that is active. Stylet challenges Gourai to a Sessions Battle; however, Gourai's weaponry does not work accurately due to Ao not properly assembling it. Although Stylet initially gets the upper hand with her flight ability, Gourai manages to use her own skills to win the match. Ao agrees to help them gather the needed data and in return, Factory Advance, the company that manufactures the F.A. Girls, will pay her for her cooperation. At this point, she realizes that she's late for school.
2	"Can a Sty-ko who Can't Fly be Called "Sty-ko"?"; Transliteration: "Tobenai Sutiko wa Sutiko de Ī no ka na?" (Japanese: 飛べないスティ子はスティ子でいいのかな？)	April 10, 2017
2	"We're Gonna Clean!"; Transliteration: "Osōji suru zo!" (Japanese: お掃除するぞ！)	April 10, 2017
As Stylet acts strangely stiff whenever Gourai comes close to her, she assumes that some trauma is causing her to be unable to fly. After Gourai tries administering some shock therapy by kissing Stylet, Ao discovers that she had accidentally stepped on one of Stylet's parts the previous night. After fixing it, she regains her ability to fly. Later, Ao receives a seemingly broken cleaning robot from the building manager, which ends up recording the F.A. Girls as they talk about Ao's embarrassing secrets. The robot then comes alive and wreaks havoc in the apartment. After Baselard breaks the robot to keep it quiet, she faces Gourai in a battle to pay Ao back, but loses due to the dust from the cleaning robot. The building manager later sends Ao a vacuum cleaner as a temporally replacement for the defective cleaning robot.
3	"Let's Go to School"; Transliteration: "Gakkō ni Ikō" (Japanese: 学校に行こう)	April 17, 2017
3	"Here Come the Materia Sisters"; Transliteration: "Materia Shimai ga Yattekita" (Japanese: マテリア姉妹がやってきた)	April 17, 2017
Baselard decides to follow Ao to school, prompting Gourai and Stylet to chase after her. Ao's model-kit obsessed friend, Kotobuki Bukiko, discovers the F.A. Girls and joins them and Ao in tracking down Baselard as she starts stealing shiny things from the school. Bukiko helps them catch Baselard using a pair of shiny nippers to lure her in. Later, two more F.A. girls known as the Materia sisters arrive and challenge Gourai and Stylet to a battle, but the latter two are having trouble working together. As the Materia sisters prove overwhelming even without any armor, Ao gives Gourai a weapon she received from Bukiko, which successfully manages to defeat the sisters thanks to Stylet's support. The sister decide to stay with Ao, to Stylet's dismay.
4	"Jinrai Has Arrived!"; Transliteration: "Jinrai Sanjō!" (Japanese: 順雷参上！)	April 24, 2017
4	"Redecorating is Fun"; Transliteration: "Oheyazukuri wa Tanoshī na" (Japanese: お部屋づくりは楽しいな)	April 24, 2017
Another F.A. Girl named Jinrai comes to Ao's place to battle against Gourai as Ao is planning her summer vacation. Gourai agrees as Jinrai won't take no for an answer. After Gourai beats her once, Jinrai proposes a sumo match, only to lose that as well. Ao gets frustrated when they still want to fight. Later, after being forced to clean up a mess they made, the girls are given their own miniature rooms (made from a bookshelf) to decorate, leaving only one empty space. As each of the girls work hard to make their own personal rooms, the Materia sisters use almost all of Ao's savings for their own dollhouse room. This upsets Ao, who proceeds to chase them down.
5	"The Architect is Activated"; Transliteration: "Ākitekuto Kidō" (Japanese: アーキテクト起動)	May 1, 2017
5	"The Errand Race"; Transliteration: "Otsukai Rēsu" (Japanese: おつかいレース)	May 1, 2017
Architect, an F.A. Girl without a physical body, intrudes on Gourai and Jinrai's battle, attacking with clones and pre-programmed subroutines that adapt to the situation. After Gourai and Jinrai manage to win the battle, Architect experiences an error in her programming, which Gourai manages to fix with her act of friendship. Afterwards, Architect receives a physical body and is delivered to Ao's place. Later, as the cleaning robot is fixed and upgraded by Bukiko (who also equips it with an A.I.) and given the name Sleipni-taro, the F.A. Girls decide to use it as transportation. They then hold a race to buy some vinegar for Ao, involving four teams: Gourai and Jinrai riding Sleipni-taro, the Materia sisters riding one of Factory Advance's drones, and Stylet and Baselard; Architect is on her own. Each team faces their own troubles: Gourai and Jinrai crash in a playground and are stuck in a sandstorm caused by Sleipni-taro, Stylet and Baselard are knocked into a field by the Materia sisters where they are licked by goats (which damages their flight abilities), and the sisters crash into a tree. Architect does not face any trouble and manages to buy the vinegar.
6	"Fireworks Festival of Feelings"; Transliteration: "Kanjite Hanabi Taikai" (Japanese: 感じて花火大会)	May 8, 2017
6	"Let's Go to School 2"; Transliteration: "Gakkō ni Ikō 2" (Japanese: 学校に行こう2)	May 8, 2017
The F.A. Girls have finished setting up a room for Architect in the empty space of the bookshelf that they're currently staying in. Ao prepares to go to a fireworks festival, but is met with opposition from Jinrai, who believes she shouldn't wear underwear under her kimono. Although the resulting commotion leads Ao to miss the festival, she gets to watch them on the roof with the F.A. Girls. Later, as Ao attempts to finish her summer homework at the last minute, the F.A. Girls are tasked with fetching her notebook from school at night, providing Baselard and the Materia Sisters with an opportunity to scare them by pretending to be ghosts. However, the girls soon become the target of a haunted pair of nippers (which is not part of Baselard and the Materia Sisters' pranks), which manages to fulfil its goal by snipping a leftover fragment off of Gourai's armor. As they head home with the notebook and the nippers, the ghost girl who possessed the nippers watches them leave. Meanwhile, Bukiko tells Ao a scary story about a ghost of a young girl who haunts her school, which is the same ghost that the F.A. Girls encountered.
7	"Vs. Hresvelgr"; Transliteration: "VS Furezuveruku" (Japanese: VSフレズヴェルク)	May 15, 2017
7	"First Tale of the F.A. Girls"; Transliteration: "Efu Ē Gāru Hajimete Monogatari" (Japanese: FAガールはじめて物語)	May 15, 2017
While the F.A. Girls play a game of hide-and-seek, Hresvelgr, the self-proclaimed "strongest F.A. Girl", arrives to face Gourai in a battle, managing to completely defeat her. She leaves afterwards. As Gourai feels frustrated over her loss, Ao asks Bukiko about how F.A. Girls are made, helping Gouri to better understand herself and aim to become stronger. After Ao sends in a report, Factory Advance sends her boxloads of new parts to upgrade Gourai.
8	"The Pep Rally"; Transliteration: "Kekki Shūkai" (Japanese: 決起集会)	May 22, 2017
8	"Autumn Beckons..."; Transliteration: "Aki ni Yobarete..." (Japanese: 秋に呼ばれて...)	May 22, 2017
After a successful test of Gourai's new parts, the F.A. Girls hold a pep rally for Gourai in preparation for a rematch against Hresvelgr, with Architect acting as the latter. Later, as Autumn rolls in, Ao takes Gourai to the park where she used to go as a kid. There, they come across a girl named Guriko, who leads them to a time capsule Ao had buried containing some mementos, including the Guriko doll she used to have. Guriko then vanishes, indicating that she was merely a vision.
9	"Ah, I'll Catch a Cold"; Transliteration: "Ao, Kaze o Hiku" (Japanese: あお、風邪をひく)	May 29, 2017
9	"Together Again Tomorrow"; Transliteration: "Ashita Mo Issho ni" (Japanese: あしたもいっしょに)	May 29, 2017
Ao ends up catching a cold, prompting the F.A. Girls to go to extreme lengths to figure out how to treat her. When their various methods only make things worse, Gourai learns to consider Ao's feelings and ask her how best to care for her. While resting from her cold, Ao has a dream in which Gourai and the other F.A. Girls are all regular human girls who go to school with her. After waking up from dream, she is fully recovered, but discovers that the F.A. Girls appeared to have the same dream as her and have caught her cold, which should not be possible since they are robots. Ao decides to take care of them now.
10	"Hot Pot Day"; Transliteration: "Nabe no Aru Hi" (Japanese: 鍋のある日)	June 5, 2017
10	"Battle! Battle!! Battle!!!"; Transliteration: "Batoru! Batoru!! Batoru!!!" (Japanese: バトル！バトル！！バトル！！！)	June 5, 2017
Ao holds a hot pot party, but the F.A. Girls can't agree on what kind of hot pot to have. Upon having her hot pot, Ao inadvertently breaks one of the Session Bases used for battles after mistaking it for a hot pot stand. Just then, Hresvelger shows up to challenge Gourai to another battle, revealing that all the F.A. Girls will be recalled to Factory Advance should Gourai lose, meaning that the company might end their business with Ao. Angered by Hresvelgr's treatment of Ao, Gourai launches a powerful attack to clash against hers, resulting in a power cut that forces the match into a draw. Hresvelger again leaves after the battle.
11	"What Lies Behind That Emotion"; Transliteration: "Sono Kimochi no Uragawa ni" (Japanese: その気持ちの裏側に)	June 12, 2017
11	"A Public Bath! A Battle?!"; Transliteration: "Sentō! Sentō!?" (Japanese: 銭湯！戦闘！？)	June 12, 2017
As Gourai becomes paranoid over Hresvelgr's threats, Ao visits Hresvelgr at Factory Advance to try and understand why she wants to battle against Gourai. She explains that she is testing Gourai in order to get her to improve her skills, as she too wishes to stay with Ao due to her loneliness. She later receives a message from Factory Advance for an upgrade. Later, Ao and Bukiko go to a public bath while the F.A. Girls go to their own virtual public bath via their Session Bases. Afterwards, Hresvelgr appears in a frightening upgraded form, Hresvelgr-Ater, to once again face Gourai, notably having a different appearance and lacking the joy of battles she had previously shown. However, Hresvelgr's upgrades start to overflow, causing her to go berserk and lose control of herself.
12	"Last Battle"; Transliteration: "Rasuto Batoru" (Japanese: ラストバトル)	June 19, 2017
12	"That Which I Give to You"; Transliteration: "Kimi ni Okurumono" (Japanese: 君に贈るもの)	June 19, 2017
Spurred on by Ao's wish to help free Hresvelgr from her corruption, the other F.A. Girls send all of their weapons to Gourai to help her fight the berserk Hresvelgr, since the powerful energy from the battle prevents them from personally helping. With everyone's combined strength, Gourai manages to win the battle and put a stop to Hresvelgr's rampage, who then returns to her senses. The battle also causes another power outage. Shortly afterwards, Gourai is taken by a recall drone back to Factory Advance, with Ao and the now-benevolent Hresvelgr unsuccessfully trying to stop it. Luckily, she quickly returns as it turns out to be a temporary recall for maintenance. She had also brought back a new fuse sent by Factory Advance to restore power to the apartment. Factory Advance also sends Ao an email to apologize for accidentally corrupting Hresvelgr with her new upgrade and allows Gourai to permanently stay with her. Later, on Christmas Eve, Ao holds a Christmas party to welcome Hresvelgr to the family, during which Gourai asks Ao to share her surname. Wanting surnames of their own, the other F.A. Girls decide to set off in search of their own special partners, holding a live show for Ao as a send-off. Ao hopes that they will return someday. Meanwhile, another F.A. Girl named Innocentia is in development at Factory Advance.

== See also ==
- Alice Gear Aegis
- Arcanadea, another plastic model series created by Kotobukiya
- Busou Shinki
- Hundred
- Infinite Stratos
- Little Battlers Experience
- Symphogear
