= Rika Abe =

Japanese voice actress

- 阿部 里果
- Born: 20 September
- Occupations: Voice actress; singer
- Years active: 2014–present
- Notable work: Mizuki Makabe in The Idolmaster Million Live! Hresvelgr in Frame Arms Girl; Z23 in Azur Lane

Rika Abe (阿部 里果, Abe Rika; born 20 September) is a Japanese voice actress and singer affiliated with VIMS. She is known for voicing Mizuki Makabe in The Idolmaster Million Live!, Z23 in Azur Lane, and Hresvelgr in Frame Arms Girl.

== Biography ==
Rika Abe, a native of Mie Prefecture, was born on 20 September and educated at the Japan Narration Acting Institute. In 2013, she voiced Mizuki Makabe in The Idolmaster Million Live!. In 2014, she made her anime debut in The Pilot's Love Song, voicing a schoolgirl. In 2015, she voiced Yousuke Tateishi's mother in Death Parade.

In March 2017, she was cast as Hresvelgr in Frame Arms Girl. This marked the first time she was cast in a major role in an anime television series. In July 2017, Abe was invited to appear at Anime Festival Asia Indonesia as a guest for the Frame Arms Girl franchise. In October 2017, as part of the Frame Arms Girl franchise, she was invited to appear at AFA Singapore as a guest, alongside her co-stars Narumi Kaho and Hibiku Yamamura.

She voices the Azur Lane franchise's anthropomorphic personification of the German destroyer Z23, and her character single (released on 20 November 2019) charted at #33 at the Oricon Single Chart. In 2019, she voiced Kanade Hokaze in Re:Stage! Dream Days. In 2021, she reprised her role as Z23 in Azur Lane: Slow Ahead!.

In June 2022, she was cast in Extreme Hearts as Hazuki Sakurai, one of the five members of May-Bee (one of the series' fictional idol groups).

In anime, she has also voiced Haruko Urachi in Sagrada Reset, Tomoko Inukai in Hanebado!, Yuriko in Boogiepop Phantom, Zerotarō in Ojarumaru, Shōko in Smile Down the Runway, Rubius in Vlad Love, and Sara in Rusted Armors. In video games, she has also voiced Riana in Quiz RPG: The World of Mystic Wiz, Chloe and Luel in White Cat Project, Otsuu in Mary Skelter 2, Shirosai in Kemono Friends 3, and Rinka Kuon in Omega Labyrinth Live.

== Filmography ==
=== Television animation ===
2014

- The Pilot's Love Song, schoolgirl
- Riddle Story of Devil

2015

- Death Parade, Yousuke's mother

2017

- Frame Arms Girl, Hresvelgr
- Sagrada Reset, Haruko Urachi

2018

- A Certain Magical Index III, salesperson
- Hanebado!, Tomoko Inukai, Chikage Yamoto, Actress, Friend of Athlete

2019

- Azur Lane, Z23
- Boogiepop Phantom, Yuriko
- Domestic Girlfriend, Sanae
- Mob Psycho 100 II, parent B
- My Roommate Is a Cat, Yasaka's mother
- Ojarumaru, Zerotarō
- Re:Stage! Dream Days, Kanade Hokaze

2020

- Smile Down the Runway, Shōko

2021

- Azur Lane: Slow Ahead!, Z23, Washington
- Cardfight!! Vanguard overDress, Students

2022

- Extreme Hearts, Hazuki Sakurai
- Rusted Armors, Sara

2023

- Shy, Civirevo Show Children

2024

- Loner Life in Another World, Vice Rep A

=== Original net animation ===
2021

- Vlad Love, Rubius

2022

- Spriggan, Airport Announcement

=== Theatrical animation ===
2018

- Anemone: Eureka Seven Hi-Evolution, Dominic (Assistant)

2019

- Ride Your Wave, Woman C

=== Video games ===
2013

- The Idolmaster Million Live!, Mizuki Makabe
- Koepura, Kaho Mochizuki

2015

- Quiz RPG: The World of Mystic Wiz, Riana
- White Cat Project, Chloe, Luel

2017

- Azur Lane, Z23, Washington, Z25
- Re:Stage! Prism Step, Kanade Hokaze
- Summer Lesson: Allison Snow, Allison Snow

2018

- Lost Trigger, Mao
- Mary Skelter 2, Otsuu
- Tale of the Fragmented Star: Single Fragment Version

2019

- Kemono Friends 3, Shirosai
- Omega Labyrinth Live, Rinka Kuon
- Tom Clancy's Ghost Recon Breakpoint, teammate, Alice B., others

2023

- Snowbreak: Containment Zone, Nita

== Discography ==
Title	Year	Details	Peak chart positions		Sales
Title	Year	Details	JPN	JPN Hot	Sales
"Azur Lane Character Song Single: Vol. 5 Z23"	2019	Released: 20 November 2019; Label: Stray Cats; Formats: CD	33	—	—
"—" denotes releases that did not chart or were not released in that region.
