= Busou Shinki =

Japanese media franchise

- Busou Shinki brand logo
- Type: Action figure
- Company: Konami
- Country: Japan
- Availability: 2006–2012

- Busou Shinki

武装神姫
- Genre: Mecha, science fiction, slice of life (TV series), Action (OVA)
- Video game

Busou Shinki: Battle Rondo
- Developer: Konami
- Publisher: Konami
- Genre: Multiplayer online raising sim
- Released: 23 April 2007
- Video game

Busou Shinki Battle Masters
- Developer: Konami
- Publisher: Konami
- Platform: PlayStation Portable
- Released: 15 July 2010
- Video game

Busou Shinki Battle Masters Mk.2
- Developer: Konami
- Publisher: Konami
- Platform: PlayStation Portable
- Released: 22 September 2011
- Manga

Busou Shinki 2036
- Written by: BLADE
- Published by: Dengeki Comics
- Magazine: Dengeki Hobby Magazine
- Original run: 2007 – 2013
- Volumes: 5
- Manga

Busou Shinki Zero
- Written by: Yuji Ihara
- Published by: Dengeki Comics
- Magazine: Dengeki Hobby Magazine
- Original run: 2010 – 2012
- Volumes: 2
- Light novel

Busou Shinki always together
- Written by: Hibiki Yu
- Published by: Konami Novels
- Published: 27 July 2007
- Light novel
- Written by: Kuga Buncho
- Published by: Shogakukan
- Imprint: Gagaga Bunko
- Original run: 17 December 2011 – 18 April 2013
- Volumes: 3
- Original video animation

Busou Shinki: Moon Angel
- Directed by: Masayuki Kojima
- Written by: Megumi Shimizu
- Studio: Kinema Citrus, TNK
- Released: 15 March 2012
- Runtime: 43 minutes
- Anime television series
- Directed by: Yasuhito Kikuchi
- Written by: Masahiro Yokotani
- Music by: Tetsurō Oda
- Studio: Eight Bit
- Original run: 4 October 2012 – 20 December 2012
- Episodes: 13
- icon

Busou Shinki (Japanese: 武装神姫, Hepburn: Busō Shinki) is a Japanese media mix franchise from Konami Digital Entertainment, first launched in Japan in 2006 with a line of action figures followed by a companion online game. The franchise encompasses various manga, anime, novels, video games, and more.

The online game was shut down in 2011, and the original toy line was discontinued in 2012.

A revival of the series was teased in December 2017 and later revealed to be centered around a smartphone game, but the game was still in development hell as of February 2020.

Busou Shinki wave 20 Arnval Mk.2 Tempesta Full Arms Package

== Action Figures and Model Kits ==
=== Original Line and MMS ===
The action figure line was launched in Japan in September 2006. Many were based on character designs by prolific Japanese artists.

A few of the figures have been released for distribution outside Japan.

Busou Shinki action figures are presented as 1:1 scale, drawing from a fictional world featuring action figure-sized androids. The various media all take place in this same setting, though in different time periods.

Busou Shinki are feminine androids with stylized body armor and/or mechanical parts (such as the mermaid-themed Ianeira having a mechanical fish tail), but do have considerable variation in aesthetic between models that reflects the artistic license given to the different designers. Due to the setting, joints and screws in the action figures are considered to be part of the designs, and are frequently depicted in art, video games, and other media, though they are sometimes omitted or less significantly depicted such as in the TV anime.

All of the figures use a common 'MMS' (Multi Moveable System) body designed by Masaki Asai. MMS figures have multiple highly articulated joints, which give them a wide range of possible poses, including a special swinging leg joint that allows for near-180 degree vertical articulation on legs. Additionally, multiple body parts are interchangeable, allowing a wide variety of customization without tools. There are three iterations of MMS (1st, 2nd, and 3rd), with 3rd coming in two body types (Short and Tall) to allow for different proportions depending on the character. Busou Shinki only uses MMS 1st and MMS 3rd Short/Tall: MMS 2nd was only used for action figures for other IPs such as Beatmania and Gurren Lagann.

The series uses a 3.3/4mm standard for parts (both body parts and equipment) that allow them to be connected to other parts. This ensures compatibility throughout the line, but deviates from the 3mm standard used by most other Japanese lines, meaning that they are only compatible with each other.

Busou Shinki product packages come in several varieties such as full sets, EX sets, Light Armor sets, and bodies. Full sets come with a unique painted MMS body with head and a full set of equipment. EX sets only include a head and a small assortment of equipment, with no MMS body. Light Armor sets are complete sets of unique MMS with head and equipment but with a significantly smaller amount of equipment and accessories and a smaller stand compared to regular sets. Bodies are sold in blister packages that only contain an MMS body with no equipment. The Arnval Mk 2 and Strarf Mk 2 also had Full Arms Package releases, which had more weapons and equipment in addition to the original full set releases.

There were also multiple exclusive repaint versions only available from Dengeki Hobby, Konami Style, or events.

Konami also released action figures for various other IPs such as Sky Girls, Otomedius, Beatmania, Gurren Lagann, and Quiz Magic Academy using MMS bodies that are compatible with the Busou Shinki line: These were branded under the MMS label, but not the Busou Shinki label. A Hayate no Gotoku collaboration figure that came with a limited-edition version of the Hayate no Gotoku game Nightmare Paradise, however, was under the Busou Shinki label as it included Busou Shinki equipment (repaints of the Valona equipment).

==== List of Action Figure Releases ====
Wave 1

Japanese Release Date: 7 September 2006
US Release Date: 18 April 2007

- Arnval (アーンヴァル, Ānvaru), Angel Type, Full Set
  Character Designer: Fumikane Shimada (島田フミカネ)
- Strarf (ストラーフ, Sutorāfu), Devil Type, Full Set
  Character Designer: Fumikane Shimada (島田フミカネ)

Wave 2

Japanese Release Date: 28 September 2006
US Release Date: 22 March 2007

- Howling (ハウリン, Haurin), Dog Type, Full Set
  Character Designer: BLADE
- Maochao (マオチャオ, Maochao), Cat Type, Full Set
  Character Designer: BLADE
- Waffebunny (ヴァッフェバニー, Vaffebanī), Rabbit Type, EX Set
  Character Designer: Tetsurō Kasahara (カサハラテツロー)

Wave 3

Japanese Release Date: 7 December 2006
US Release Date: 22 March 2007 (Note, this release consisted of Benio only)

- Xiphos (サイフォス, Saifosu), Knight Type, Full Set
  Character Designer: Rokurō Shinofusa (篠房六郎)
- Benio (紅緒, Benio), Samurai Type, Full Set
  Character Designer: Rokurō Shinofusa (篠房六郎)
- Tsugaru (ツガル, Tsugaru), Santa Claus Type, EX Set
  Character Designer: Goli

Wave 4

Japanese Release Date: 22 February 2007

- Zyrdarya (ジルダリア, Jirudaria), Flower Type, Full Set
  Character Designer: Okama
- Juvisy (ジュビジー, Jubijī), Seed Type, Full Set
  Character Designer: Okama
- Fort Bragg (フォートブラッグ, Fōto Buraggu), Battery Type, EX Set
  Character Designer: Takayuki Yanase (柳瀬敬之)

Wave 5

Japanese Release Date: 31 May 2007

- Eukrante (エウクランテ, Eukurante), Seiren Type, Full Set
  Character Designer: Ryōta Magaki (間垣亮太)
- Ianeira (イーアネイラ, ĪANEIRA), Mermaid Type, Full Set
  Character Designer: Ryōta Magaki (間垣亮太)
- Waffedolphin (ヴァッフェドルフィン, VAFFEDORUFIN), Dolphin Type, EX Set
  Character Designer: Tetsurō Kasahara (カサハラテッロー)

Wave 6

Japanese Release Date: 30 August 2007

- Tigris (ティグリース, Tigurīsu), Tiger Type, Full Set
  Character Designers: Eiichi Shimizu (清水栄一), Tomohiro Shimoguchi (下口智裕)
- Vitulus (ウィトゥルース, Witurūsu), Calf Type, Full Set
  Character Designers: Eiichi Shimizu (清水栄一), Tomohiro Shimoguchi (下口智裕)
- Grapprap (グラップラップ, Gurappurappu), Builder Type, EX Set
  Character Designer: Eisaku Kitō (鬼頭栄作)

Wave 7

Japanese Release Date: 29 November 2007

- ACH (アーク, Āku), High Speed Trike Type, Full Set
  Character Designer: Choco
- YDA (イーダ, Īda), High Maneuver Trike Type, Full Set
  Character Designer: Choco
- Schmetterling (シュメッターリング, Shumettāringu), Butterfly Type, EX Set
  Character Designer: Chibisuke Machine (ちびすけマシーン)

Wave 8

Japanese Release Date: 5 April 2008

- Murmeltier (ムルメルティア, Murumerutia), Panzer Type, Full Set
  Character Designer: Fumikane Shimada (島田フミカネ)
- Asuka (飛鳥, Asuka), Fighter Type, Full Set
  Character Designer: Fumikane Shimada (島田フミカネ)
- Zelnogrard (ゼルノグラード, Zerunogurādo), Firearms Type, EX Set+Body
  Character Designer: Takayuki Yanase (柳瀬敬之)

Wave 9

Japanese Release Date: 10 July 2008

- Lançamento (ランサメント, Ransamento), Rhinoceras Beetle Type, Full Set
  Character Designer: Tanimeso (たにめそ)
- Espadia (エスパディア, Esupadia), Stag Beetle Type, Full Set
  Character Designer: Tanimeso (たにめそ)

Wave 10

Japanese Release Date: 20 November 2008

- Graffias (グラフィオス, Gurafiosu), Scorpion Type, Full Set
  Character Designer: Ryōta Magaki (間垣亮太)
- Vespelio (ウェスペリオー, Wesuperiō), Bat Type, Full Set
  Character Designer: Ryōta Magaki (間垣亮太)

Wave 1 Renewal Version

Japanese Release Date: 4 December 2008

- Arnval Tranche 2 (アーンヴァル トランシェ2, Ānvaru Toranshe 2), Angel Type, Full Set
  Character Designer: Fumikane Shimada (島田フミカネ)
- Strarf bis (ストラーフ bis, Sutorāfu bis), Devil Type, Full Set
  Character Designer: Fumikane Shimada (島田フミカネ)

Wave 11

Japanese Release Date: 27 March 2010

- Altlene (アルトレーネ), Valkyrie Type, Full Set
  Character Designer: Taraku Uon (羽音たらく),
  Armament Redesigner: Takayuki Yanase (柳瀬敬之),
  Concept and Original Armament Desighner: Kem by Bokusin-Contest Grand Prix
- Altines (アルトアイネス), Valkyrie Type, Full Set
  LE Konamistyle Japanese and Dengeki Exclusive
  Character Designer: Taraku Uon (羽音たらく),
  Armament Redesigner: Takayuki Yanase (柳瀬敬之),
  Concept and Original Armament Desighner: Kem by Bokusin-Contest Grand Prix

Wave 12

Japanese Release Date: 30 September 2010

- Baby Razz (ベイビーラズ, Beibī Razu), Electric Guitar Type, Full Set
  Character Designer: Choco
- Sharatang (紗羅檀, Sharatan), Violin Type, Full Set
  Character Designer: Choco

Wave 13

Japanese Release Date: 28 October 2010

- Gabrine (ガブリーヌ, Gaburīnu), Hellhound Type, Full Set
  Character Designer: Yoshitsune Izuna (いずなよしつね)
- Renge (蓮華, Renge), Ninetailed Fox Type, Full Set
  Character Designer: Yoshitsune Izuna (いずなよしつね)

Wave 14

Japanese Release Date: 16 December 2010

- Artille (アーティル, Ātiru), Lynx Type, Full Set
  Character Designer: Kazuhiko Kakoi (かこいかずひこ)
- Raptias (ラプティアス, Raputiasu), Eagle Type, Full Set
  Character Designer: Kazuhiko Kakoi (かこいかずひこ)

Wave 15

Japanese Release Date: 27 January 2011

- Maryceles (マリーセレス, Marīseresu), Tentacles Type, Full Set
  Character Designer: Niθ
- Proxima (プロキシマ, Purokishima), Centaurus Type, Full Set
  Character Designer: Niθ

Wave 16

Japanese Release Date: 24 February 2011

- Oorbellen (オールベルン, Ōruberun), Fencer-Pearl Type, Full Set
  Character Designer: Fumikane Shimada (島田フミカネ)
- Zielbellen (ジールベルン, Jīruberun), Fencer-Obsidian Type, Full Set
  Character Designer: Fumikane Shimada (島田フミカネ)

Wave 17

Japanese Release Date: 17 March 2011

- Arnval Mk.2 Tempesta (アーンヴァルMk.2 テンペスタ), Angel Type, Full Set
  Character Designer: Fumikane Shimada (島田フミカネ)
- Strarf Mk.2 Lavina (ストラーフMk.2 ラヴィーナ), Devil Type, Full Set
  Character Designer: Fumikane Shimada (島田フミカネ)

Wave18

Japanese Release Date: 17 December 2011

- Vervietta (ヴェルヴィエッタ), Vicviper Type, Full
- Lirbiete (リルビエート), Vicviper Type, Full
  Character Designer: Mika Akitaka (明貴美加)

Wave19

Japanese Release Date: 23 February 2012

- Fubuki type 2 (フブキ弐型), Ninja Type, Full Set
- Mizuki Type 2 (ミズキ弐型), Ninja Type, Full Set
  Character Designer: Humikane Shimada (島田フミカネ)

Wave 20

Japanese Release Date: 15 March 2012

- Arnval Mk.2 Tempesta Full Arms Package (アーンヴァルMk.2 テンペスタ フルアームズパッケージ), Angel Type, Full Set
  Character Designer: Fumikane Shimada (島田フミカネ)
- Strarf Mk.2 Lavina Full Arms Package (ストラーフMk.2 ラヴィーナ フルアームズパッケージ), Devil Type, Full Set
  Character Designer: Fumikane Shimada (島田フミカネ)

Light Armor Wave 1

Japanese Release Date: 4 October 2008

- Valona (ヴァローナ, Varōna), Succubus Type, Light Armour Full Set
  Character Designer: Fumikane Shimada (島田フミカネ)
- Werkstra (ウェルクストラ, Werukusutora), Commando Angel Type, Light Armour Full Set
  Character Designer: Fumikane Shimada (島田フミカネ)

Light Armor Wave 2

Japanese Release Date: 30 October 2008

- Bright Feather (ブライトフェザー, Buraitofezā), Nurse Type, Light Armour Full Set
  Character Designer: Mercy Rabbit (マーシーラビット)
- Harmony Grace (ハーモニーグレイス, Hāmonī Gureisu), Sister (nun) Type, Light Armour Full Set
  Character Designer: Mercy Rabbit (マーシーラビット)

Light Armor Wave 3

Japanese Release Date: 29 February 2009

- Partio (パーティオ, Pātio), Ferret Type, Light Armor Full Set
  Character Designer: BLADE
- Pomock (ポモック, Pomokku), Squirrel Type, Light Armor Full Set
  Character Designer: BLADE

Light Armor Wave 4

Japanese Release Date: 25 February 2010

- Kohiru (こひる, Kohiru), Chopsticks Type, Light Armor Full Set
  Character Designer: Dogmask
- Merienda (メリエンダ, Merienda ), Spoon Type, Light Armor Full Set
  Character Designer: Dogmask

Special Releases

Japanese Release Date: 26 December 2008

- Fubuki (フブキ, Fubuki), Ninja Type, Full Set
  Character Designer: nuno
  LE Konamistyle Japanese Exclusive
- Mizuki (ミズキ, Mizuki), Ninja Type, Full Set
  Character Designer: nuno
  LE Konamistyle Japanese Exclusive

Japanese Release Date: 26 March 2009

- Nagi (ナギ, Nagi), Ojousama Type, Light Armor Full Set
  Character Designer: Kenjiro Hata
  Only available from a special release with the Hayate no Gotoku PSP game Nightmare Paradise Konami Style Japanese exclusive limited edition.
  Character Redesigner: Fumikane Shimada (島田フミカネ),
  Original Character Designer: Kenjirou Hata (畑健二郎)

Japanese Release Date: 15 July 2010

- Arnval Mk.2 (アーンヴァルMk.2), Angel Type, Full Set
  Character Designer: Fumikane Shimada (島田フミカネ)
- Strarf Mk.2 (ストラーフMk.2 ), Devil Type, Full Set
  Character Designer: Fumikane Shimada (島田フミカネ)

Only available from a special release with the Busou Shinki Battle Masters PSP game Konami Style Japanese exclusive limited edition.

Japanese Release Date: 22 September 2011

- Arnval Mk.2 Full Arms Package (アーンヴァルMk.2 フルアームズパッケージ), Angel Type, Full Set
  Character Designer: Fumikane Shimada (島田フミカネ)
- Strarf Mk.2 Full Arms Package (ストラーフMk.2 フルアームズパッケージ), Devil Type, Full Set
  Character Designer: Fumikane Shimada (島田フミカネ)
- Swimsuit Body for Arnval MK.2
- Swimsuit Body for Strarf MK.2

Only available from a special release with the Busou Shinki Battle Masters Mk.2 PSP game Konami Style Japanese exclusive limited edition

==== Busou Shinki Variants ====
Several limited edition versions of the Busou Shinki figures have also been released. These variants sport alternate color schemes and additional parts.

- Dengeki Exclusive Devil Type, Strarf
- Dengeki Exclusive Angel Type, Arnval
- Dengeki Exclusive Cat Type, Maochao
- Dengeki Exclusive Dog Type, Howling
- Wonder Festival 2008 Seiren Type, Eukrante
- Wonder Festival 2008 Mermaid Type, Ianeira
- Konami Style Exclusive Blue Santa Claus Type, Tsugaru
- Konami Style / Chara Hobby 2008 Prototype Squirrel Type, Pomock
- Konami Style / Chara Hobby 2008 Prototype Ferret Type, Partio
- Dengeki Hobby Magazine ed. High Speed Trike Type, ACH Stradale
- Dengeki Hobby Magazine ed. High Maneuver Trike Type, YDA Stradale
- Konami Style Exclusive Angel Type, Arnval Tranche2
- Konami Style Exclusive Devil Type, Strarf Bis
- Konami Style Exclusive Ninja Type, Mizuki
- Konami Style Exclusive Commando Angel Type, Werkstra
- Konami Style Exclusive Succubus Type, Valona
- Konami Style Exclusive Panzer Type, Murmeltier
- Konami Style Exclusive Fighter Type, Asuka
- Konami Style Exclusive Valkyrie Type, Altlene Viola
- Konami Style Exclusive Valkyrie Type, Altines Rosa
- Konami Style Exclusive Fencer-Garnet Type, Oorbellen
- Konami Style Exclusive Fencer-Sapphire Type, Zielbellen
- Konami Style Exclusive Fencer-Moonstone Type, Oorbellen Lunaria
- Konami Style Exclusive Fencer-Amethyst Type, Zielbellen
- Konami Style Exclusive Lynx Type, Artille Full-Barrel
- Konami Style Exclusive Eagle Type, Raptias Air-Dominance
- Konami Style Exclusive Battery Type, Fort Bragg Dusk
- Konami Style Exclusive Firearms Type, Zelnogrard Belik
- Konami Style Exclusive Tentacles Type, Maryceles Lemuria
- Konami Style Exclusive Centaurus Type, Proxima Spinel

==== MMS Naked Body Releases ====
Exclusively sold on the Konami Style Japan page, these are unpainted, featureless MMS Figures meant for use with EX sets or for customization. They come in a variety of colors and shades of skintone intended to match other MMS figures.

The MMS Naked bodies are available, like the Busou Shinki figures themselves, in three different body archetypes: MMS 1st, MMS 3rd (small) and MMS 3rd (tall). Although similar in form and construction, not all body parts are compatible among them.

- MMS 1st
  - Naked White
  - Naked Black
  - Naked Flesh ver. 1
  - Naked Flesh ver. 1 - Gym Uniform Wine Red
  - Naked Flesh ver. 2
  - Naked Flesh ver. 2 - Gym Uniform Navy Blue
  - Naked Flesh ver. 2 - School Swimsuit Navy Blue Type
  - Naked Flesh ver. 2 - School Swimsuit White Type
  - Naked Flesh ver. 3
- MMS 3rd (small)
  - Naked White (small)
  - Naked Black (small)
  - Naked Flesh ver. 2 (small)
  - Naked Flesh ver. 2 (small) - School Swimsuit White Type
  - Naked Flesh ver. 4 (small)
  - Naked Flesh ver. 4 (small) - School Swimsuit Navy Blue Type
  - Naked Flesh ver. 5 (small)
- MMS 3rd (tall)
  - Naked White (tall)
  - Naked Black (tall)
  - Naked Flesh ver. 2 (tall)
  - Naked Flesh ver. 2 (tall) - School Swimsuit White Type
  - Naked Flesh ver. 4 (tall)
  - Naked Flesh ver. 4 (tall) - School Swimsuit Navy Blue Type
  - Naked Flesh ver. 5 (tall)

=== 2016 Reproductions ===
Though the original line was discontinued in 2012, purchasers of the 2015 anime Blu-Ray box set received a serial code allowing them to purchase limited run reproductions of the MMS bodies of the four main Shinki from the anime (Arnval mk. 2, Strarf mk. 2, Altines, and Altlene).

These were reproductions of the MMS bodies only, and did not include the equipment or most of the accessories from the original releases, and came in entirely new packaging. The reproductions were priced at 8000 yen per MMS, or 25,000 yen for a set of all four.

The reproductions were popular enough that additional batches had to be produced, alongside additional Blu-Ray box sets. Though originally announced for an April 2016 release, the reproduction set was delayed to December 2016.

=== Megami Device Collaboration Model Kits ===
After the 2017 revival, the series has been getting collaboration model kit releases from Kotobukiya's Megami Device line, which many former Busou Shinki key staff such as series/MMS creator Masaki Asai, former series producer Toriyama Toriwo, and designers Fumikane Shimada and Takayuki Yanase are involved with.

The first revival shinki, Edelweiss, was released in January 2019 as part of a tie-in with the upcoming smartphone game Busou Shinki R (then unnamed), but the game was further delayed. The Edelweiss kit thus uses the generic Busou Shinki series logo instead of the Busou Shinki R logo in its branding, while the card from the Battle Conductor arcade game which was released after the Busou Shinki R logo was revealed uses the R logo.

Releases of Arnval and Strarf as Megami Device collaboration model kits were also announced in 2015, predating the revival announcement, but as of December 2020 no release date has been announced yet.

The kits are not based on the old MMS design, and instead use the new Machinica standard designed by Asai.

The Megami Device line uses the Japanese model kit industry standard of 3mm joints, meaning that they are by default incompatible with the original Busou Shinki line, but Kotobukiya has released joint adapters that allow one to establish compatibility between 3.0 and 3.3mm standards.

It was initially announced in early 2018 that other new designs from the revival would get Megami Device model kits, but no progress was made on them, and with Asai's distancing himself from the project in 2020 it is unclear if they will be made. Toriyama is still attached to the mobile game project and its kits, however, and a prototype body for a second collaboration kit with character design by BLADE was shown at Wonder Festival Summer 2018, but as of 2024 this kit has not been released. BLADE was later commissioned for similar but different designs for Megami Device, unrelated to the Busou Shinki brand, which were announced in 2023 and had kits released in 2024 as the PUNI☆MOFU line, starting with PUNI☆MOFU Mao.

==== List of Megami Device Collaboration Model Kit Releases ====
Megami Device

Japanese Release Date: 25 January 2019

- Edelweiss (エーデルワイス, Ēderuwaisu), Jaeger Type (猟兵型)
  Character Designer: Fumikane Shimada (島田フミカネ)

Japanese Release Date: 25 November 2022

- Arnval (アーンヴァル, Ānvaru), Angel Type
  Character Designer: Fumikane Shimada

Japanese Release Date: 24 May 2023

- Strarf (ストラーフ, Sutorāfu), Devil Type
  Character Designer: Fumikane Shimada

== Video games ==
=== Busou Shinki Battle Rondo ===
On 23 April 2007 Konami released Battle Rondo. Battle Rondo was a free multiplayer online raising sim set in the fictional Busou Shinki universe. Players could unlock in-game versions of the figures, including their armor and weapons, and other gear, by inputting codes that came with each Busou Shinki figure, or through micropayments. The game consisted primarily of automated one-on-one battles with NPC or player-owned Shinki, and the main objective of the game was to have Shinki participate in battles while maintaining high win ratios in order to raise their ranks. The game also had time-limited event quests with their own storylines.

The game used a battle system which had Shinki fight automatically, with the player "training" the AI to fight more effectively through feedback after each match. The game would also output battle logs as text files in which the reasons for actions taken in battle would be detailed, allowing the player to give more accurate feedback to the Shinki. Shinki personalities (influencing actions they take in battle and how they respond to feedback) and stats were affected by the initial setup, in which the player selected three "CSC" core crystals. CSCs could not be changed without resetting a Shinki entirely, which would reset them to level 1 and lore-wise erases their memories.

The game was discontinued on 31 October 2011, and the official web portal was closed down.

=== Busou Shinki Battle Masters ===
Busou Shinki Battle Masters was developed by Konami for the PlayStation Portable released 15 July 2010. A sequel/updated version, also for the PSP, Busou Shinki Battle Masters Mk.2 was released on 22 September 2011. Both releases had limited edition releases which from Konami's online store Konami Style which included exclusive limited release action figures.

Both were conventional action games, with the player taking direct control of shinki (unlike Battle Rondo). The in-world lore justification for this is that Battle Masters takes place in 2040 as opposed to Battle Rondo's 2036, and that taking control of shinki is made possible by new virtual reality technology.

=== Busou Shinki Battle Communication ===
Busou Shinki: Battle Communication was a social game developed by Mobage for feature phones that was launched on 31 October 2010. The service was discontinued on 22 May 2012.

=== Busou Shinki Armored Princess Battle Conductor ===
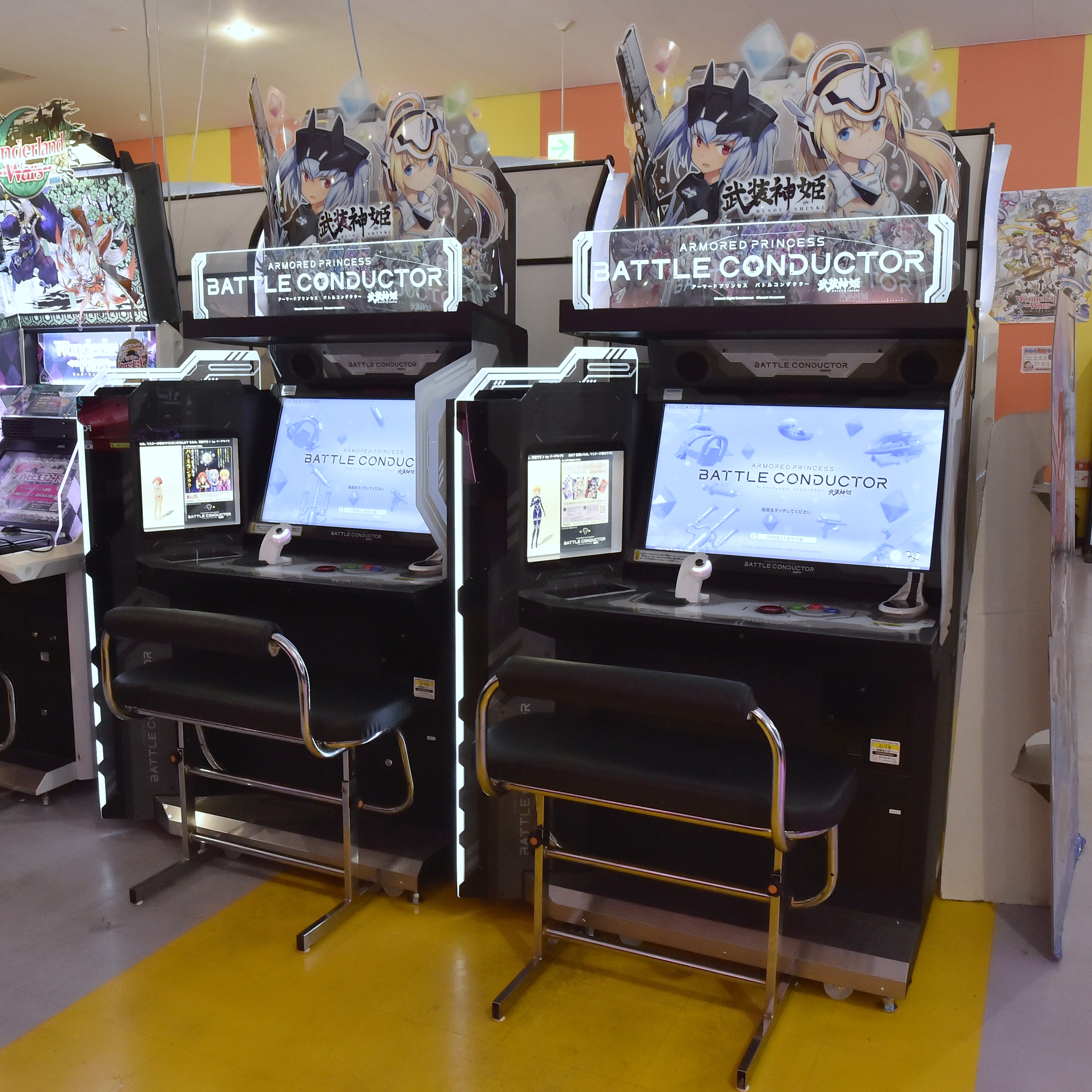
Busou Shinki: Armored Princess Battle Conductor arcade cabinets

Busou Shinki: Armored Princess Battle Conductor is an arcade game with four-player online battle royale gameplay, in which players take control of teams of three shinki and compete to collect the greatest amount of gems in a match, that was developed by Konami and released on 24 December 2020. The game also makes use of a holographic display, and players save their progress through use of a Konami e-Amusement IC pass and by outputting shinki as physical trading cards via a Card Connect machine.

The appearance of Edelweiss in the game was promoted as being a crossover/collaboration with Busou Shinki R, even though Busou Shinki R has not been released yet.

The game has also had collaborations with other Konami IPs such as the Bemani series, Quiz Magic Academy series, Tokimeki Memorial series, Sky Girls series, and LovePlus series.

=== Busou Shinki R (Tentative Title) ===
Busou Shinki R was initially teased with no title in December 2017 before being officially announced as a smartphone game in February 2020. No release date has been revealed yet, and the title is tentative.

== Bibliography ==
=== Busou Shinki 2036 ===
Busou Shinki 2036 (武装神姫2036, Busou Shinki 2036) is a manga series by BLADE. The series began its serialization in Dengeki Hobby Magazine in June 2007, with the first tankobon volume published under the Dengeki Comics label in 2008. The fifth and last volume was published in March 2013.

| No. | Release date | ISBN |
|---|---|---|
| 01 | 26 July 2008 | 978-4048672030 |
| 02 | 27 July 2009 | 978-4048679756 |
| 03 | 27 May 2011 | 978-4048704335 |
| 04 | 27 October 2012 | 978-4048910606 |
| 05 | 27 March 2013 | 978-4048915090 |

=== Busou Shinki Zero ===
A different manga series by Yuji Ihara that was also published under the Dengeki Comics label.

Novels
| Volume number | Release date | ISBN | Full Japanese title | Reference |
|---|---|---|---|---|
| 1 | 27 March 2010 | 978-4048685153 | 武装神姫 ZERO 1 | |
| 2 | 27 March 2012 | 978-4048863827 | 武装神姫 ZERO 2 | |

=== Busou Shinki Always Together ===
A novel by Hibiki Yu, published by Konami Novels.

Novels
| Title | Release date | ISBN | Full Japanese title | Reference |
|---|---|---|---|---|
| Busou Shinki always together | 27 July 2007 | 978-4-86155-180-2 | 武装神姫 always together | |

=== Gagaga Bunko Novel Series ===
A series of novels based on the franchise by Kuga Buncho, published by Gagaga Bunko.

Novels
| Title | Release date | ISBN | Full Japanese title | Reference |
|---|---|---|---|---|
| Busou Shinki LOST DAYS | 17 December 2011 | 978-4094513134 | 武装神姫 LOST DAYS | |
| Busou Shinki 2 STRAY DOGS | 19 September 2012 | 978-4094513653 | 武装神姫 2 STRAY DOGS | |
| Busou Shinki 3 GHOST DIGS | 18 April 2013 | 978-4094514094 | 武装神姫 3 GHOST DIGS | |

=== Other manga and novels ===
Busou Shinki: Forget-me-not was a manga by Wasaba that was serialized on Konami's feature phone portal Shukan Konami from 20 April 2007 to 26 December 2008, with 64 chapters. No books were ever released.

Busou Shinki Light! is a manga by BLADE that was serialized in the magazine Figure Maniacs Otome-gumi. It did not get its own releases, but was included in volumes 2–4 of Busou Shinki 2036, which is also by BLADE.

Hibusou Shinki is a webcomic by Karashiichi that ran on the official Busou Shinki website from 2008 to 2010. No books were ever released, but its first appearance, later relabelled "episode 0" when released on the website, was first published in the mook Busou Shinki Master's Book.

=== Other books ===
Several other books and mooks related to the franchise have also been published by Kadokawa and Konami Digital Entertainment.

Other books
| Title | Release date | ISBN-13 or ASIN | Title (Japanese) |
|---|---|---|---|
| Busou Shinki Master's Book | 27 July 2007 | 978-4861551796 | 武装神姫マスターズブック |
| Busou Shinki magazine vol. 1 | 1 July 2009 | 978-4048676397 | 武装神姫magazine vol.1 |
| Busou Shinki magazine vol. 2 | 1 March 2010 | 978-4048685023 | 武装神姫magazine vol.2 |
| Busou Shinki BATTLE MASTERS Mk. 2 The Complete Guide | 8 October 2011 | 978-4048709088 | 武装神姫BATTLE MASTERS Mk.2 ザ・コンプリートガイド |
| Busou Shinki Archive | 11 November 2011 | 978-4048706773 | 武装神姫アーカイブ |
| Busou Shinki Archive 2 TV Anime Ver. | 25 June 2013 | 978-4048912426 | 武装神姫アーカイブ2 TVアニメVer. |
| Busou Shinki Gen'an Illust-shu LEGENDS Vol. 01 Shimada Fumikane | 31 October 2018 | ASIN: B07HGKV6RC | 「武装神姫」原案イラスト集 LEGENDS Vol.01 島田フミカネ |
| Busou Shinki Gen'an Illust-shu LEGENDS Vol. 02 BLADE | 25 March 2019 | ASIN: B07MWQGFTK | 「武装神姫」原案イラスト集 LEGENDS Vol.02 BLADE |
| Busou Shinki Gen'an Illust-shu LEGENDS Vol. 03 CHOCO | 29 November 2019 | ASIN: B07X37QBPS | 「武装神姫」原案イラスト集 LEGENDS Vol.03 CHOCO |
| Busou Shinki Gen'an Illust-shu ALLSTARS | 31 March 2021 | ASIN: B08R665F7C | 「武装神姫」原案イラスト集 ALLSTARS |

== Radio shows ==
=== Busou Shinki Radio Rondo ===
An internet radio show hosted by Kana Asumi and Eri Kitamura to promote and discuss Battle Rondo, broadcast weekly on i-revo and Onsen.ag from 26 April 2007 to 25 October 2007 (episodes on Onsen were released one week after i-Revo). Special additional recordings were also included on the Battle Rondo soundtrack and on the Character Song & Special Radio Rondo albums.

Recordings of the radio show were compiled and released on CD in 2008.

=== Busou Shinki Master no tame no Radio desu ===
An internet radio show hosted by Kana Asumi and Minori Chihara to promote and discuss the TV anime series, broadcast on Onsen.ag from 24 September 2012 to 1 October 2013. Episodes were released weekly up to episode 27, and then once every two weeks after. A special episode was released in 2015 to coincide with the TV series Blu-ray box release, with another in 2017 for the Blu-ray box re-release.

Recordings of the radio show were compiled and released on CD in four volumes from 2012 to 2014.

== Discography ==
Character song albums, video game soundtracks, and radio show recordings have been released on CD. Many of the individual tracks from the music CDs (but not the radio show CDs) are also available for sale by download in MP3 file format from online stores such as Amazon and iTunes.

=== Video game soundtracks ===
| Title | Release date | ASIN | Title |
|---|---|---|---|
| Busou Shinki Battle Rondo Original Soundtrack | 20 November 2009 | B00I4S1HYS | 武装神姫 バトルロンド オリジナルサウンドトラック |
| Busou Shinki Battle Masters Original Soundtrack | 15 July 2010 | B00B7DA6SK | 武装神姫 バトルマスターズ オリジナルサウンドトラック |
| Busou Shinki Battle Masters Mk. 2 Original Soundtrack | 22 September 2011 | B007GERBM8 | 武装神姫 BATTLE MASTERS Mk.2オリジナルサウンドトラック |

=== Character song albums ===
| Title | Release date | ASIN | Title |
|---|---|---|---|
| Busou Shinki Character Song & Special Radio Rondo | 25 November 2010 | B009ZCG0ZS | 武装神姫 CHARACTER SONG and SPECIAL RADIO RONDO |
| Busou Shinki Character Song & Special Radio Rondo vol. 2 | 17 March 2011 | B01AVX0ZRI | 武装神姫 CHARACTER SONG and SPECIAL RADIO RONDO Vol.2 |
| Busou Shinki Character Song & Special Radio Rondo vol. 3 | 10 January 2012 | B00E0BBQBC | 武装神姫 CHARACTER SONG and SPECIAL RADIO RONDO Vol.3 |

=== Radio talk show recordings ===
| Volume | Release date | ASIN | Title |
|---|---|---|---|
| Busou Shinki Radio Rondo | 21 March 2008 | B0092YGJJQ | 武装神姫 RADIO RONDO |
| Radio CD Busou Shinki Master no tame no Radio desu vol. 1 | 26 December 2012 | B00A5XWL7W | ラジオCD 武装神姫 マスターのためのラジオです。 Vol.1 |
| Radio CD Busou Shinki Master no tame no Radio desu vol. 2 | 7 August 2013 | B00DDXWX60 | ラジオCD 武装神姫 マスターのためのラジオです。 Vol.2 |
| Radio CD Busou Shinki Master no tame no Radio desu vol. 3 | 20 November 2013 | B00FFTEYL2 | ラジオCD 武装神姫 マスターのためのラジオです。 Vol.3 |
| Radio CD Busou Shinki Master no tame no Radio desu vol. 4 | 29 January 2014 | B00GNWNS08 | ラジオCD 武装神姫 マスターのためのラジオです。 Vol.4 |

=== TV anime-related music ===
| Title | Release date | ASIN | Title |
|---|---|---|---|
| TV Anime Busou Shinki Opening Theme "Install x Dream" | 17 October 2012 | B008YCR3VU | TVアニメ 「 武装神姫 」 オープニングテーマ Install x Dream |
| TV Anime Busou Shinki Ending Theme "Taiyou no Sign" | 17 October 2012 | B008YCN1YI | TVアニメ「 武装神姫 」エンディングテーマ 太陽のサイン |
| TV Anime Busou Shinki Character Song Series "Bu" Sky Garden | 21 November 2012 | B009HA5CRU | TVアニメ「武装神姫」Character Song Series [武] SKY GARDEN |
| TV Anime Busou Shinki Character Song Series "Sou" Ikisaki | 21 November 2012 | B009HA5BGC | TVアニメ「武装神姫」Character Song Series [装] いきさき |
| TV Anime Busou Shinki Character Song Series "Shin" HA・CHA・ME・CHA☆QUEEN | 21 November 2012 | B009HA5AUO | TVアニメ「武装神姫」Character Song Series [神] HA・CHA・ME・CHA☆QUEEN |
| TV Anime Busou Shinki Character Song Series "Ki" PEACE & LUCK | 21 November 2012 | B009HA5CMU | TVアニメ「武装神姫」Character Song Series [姫] PEACE & LUCK |
| TV Anime Busou Shinki Soundtrack | 5 December 2012 | B009EZ77Y4 | TVアニメ 武装神姫 オリジナルサウンドトラック > |
| TV Anime Busou Shinki Album "Scenes from BUSOUSHINKI" | 26 December 2012 | B009WTTHZO | TVアニメ「武装神姫」アルバム TVアニメ「武装神姫」Scenes from BUSOUSHINKI |

== Anime ==
Busou Shinki has had two anime series, a 2011 OVA and a 2012 13-episode TV series.

=== OVA ===
Busou Shinki: Moon Angel (武装神姫: Moon Angel, Busou Shinki: Moon Angel) is an original video animation produced by Kinema Citrus and TNK.

The OVA was originally released as DLC for the PSP video game Battle Masters Mk 2, viewable through an in-game menu. The ten installments were later assembled into a 40-minute OVA that had a limited release on DVD and Blu-ray Disc via Konami's Konami Style online shop in Japan.

=== TV series ===
The TV series was broadcast in Japan in 2012. Individual DVD and Blu-Ray volumes were released in 2011–2012, and a Blu-Ray-only box set was released in 2015. Episode 13 of the series was not broadcast on TV and only released on disc.

The TV series was licensed for distribution in North America by Sentai Filmworks and began streaming on Anime Network in 2012.

== Legacy ==
After the discontinuing of the action figure line, key staff such as series/MMS creator Masaki Asai and former series producer Toriwo Toriyama went on to work on the Megami Device line of model kits for Kotobukiya, which has a similar premise and concept and is considered by many as a spiritual successor. Designers Fumikane Shimada and Takayuki Yanase, who had previously worked on Busou Shinki, also worked on designs for the line. The official Megami Device webcomic is also drawn by Karashiichi, who previously did the official Busou Shinki website webcomic Hibusou Shinki, and the comic has returning characters from Hibusou Shinki.

As part of a tie-in with the upcoming smartphone game Busou Shinki R, Megami Device has also seen the release of one of the new shinki from the game, Edelweiss, as a collaboration model kit.

Releases of Arnval and Strarf as Megami Device collaboration model kits were also announced in 2015.

Pyramid Inc., which developed the Battle Masters games, developed the smartphone game Alice Gear Aegis which is also a "mecha girl" genre action game. Fumikane Shimada and Takayuki Yanase also worked on designs for the game, and Alice Gear Aegis has also had collaboration model kit releases from Megami Device. Pyramid staff such as president Junichi Kashiwagi are frequently present at Megami Device-related events as well, such as Wonder Festival talk shows.

After Konami's Busou Shinki revival was announced in December 2017, Asai announced that he was being officially involved with the project at Konami's request in early 2018, and he worked on the Edelweiss, Arnval and Starf model kits for Megami Device as part of this. It was also announced that more new designs from the revival would be getting releases as model kits in the future.

But though the Edelweiss kit (released January 2019) was supposed to be released alongside the Busou Shinki R smartphone game, the game ended up in development hell, with the title not announced yet at the time of the Edelweiss' release.

Asai reported in February 2020 that development on Busou Shinki R had recently restarted from scratch. This, combined with how Konami was not keeping him up to date on developments, with him not learning about the Battle Conductor arcade game until seeing announcements on Twitter, resulted in him releasing a statement on his personal blog saying that he no longer considers himself to be part of the project, citing the aforementioned incidents and how he is being kept out of the loop. No work had been done on any collaboration model kits aside from the Edelweiss, Arnval and Strarf, and so it is unclear if any other revival designs will be released.

== See also ==
- Alice Gear Aegis
- Frame Arms Girl
