= Sky Girls =

Japanese anime franchise

- Promotional image featuring the three main characters of the Original Video Animation

スカイガールズ
- Genre: Action, Drama, Mecha, Military
- Original video animation
- Directed by: Yoshiaki Iwasaki
- Produced by: Konami
- Written by: Takao Yoshioka
- Music by: Shinkichi Mitsumune
- Studio: J.C.Staff
- Released: August 25, 2006
- Runtime: 30 minutes
- Anime television series
- Directed by: Yoshiaki Iwasaki
- Produced by: Konami
- Written by: Takao Yoshioka
- Music by: Shinkichi Mitsumune
- Studio: J.C.Staff
- Original network: Chiba TV
- Original run: July 5, 2007 – December 27, 2007
- Episodes: 26
- Manga
- Written by: Eishi Ozeki (art)
- Published by: Kodansha
- Magazine: Magazine Z
- Original run: August 25, 2007 – December 25, 2007
- Volumes: 1
- Anime television series

Sky Girls TV DVD Specials
- Directed by: Yoshiaki Iwasaki
- Produced by: Konami
- Written by: Takao Yoshioka
- Music by: Shinkichi Mitsumune
- Studio: J.C.Staff
- Original network: Chiba TV
- Original run: November 13, 2007 – June 25, 2008
- Episodes: 9
- icon

Sky Girls (スカイガールズ, Sukai Gāruzu) is a Japanese anime franchise produced by Konami and J.C.Staff. A 30-minute OVA episode was released on August 25, 2006, and a television series adaptation aired on Chiba TV from July 5, 2007, to December 27, 2007.

== Plot ==
In the year 2071, humanity sees the appearance of mechanical cell clusters, known as WORMs. The technology begins sweeping away the human race on a massive scale, destroying one-third of the human population in just under two years. This leads humanity to overcome their national differences, and unite as a single force. Not being able to turn the situation in their favor, humanity decided to permit the use of weapons of mass destruction. Finally, they succeeded in the annihilation of the WORMs, but after paying an enormous price, and wreaking havoc on the planet. All the major continents were broken apart. Antarctica disappeared, and half of the remaining land mass was submerged. The largest damage this war caused was the loss of 90% of all military-age personnel, namely men in their twenties and thirties. Over a decade later, the WORMs re-appear, to the surprise of those who thought they were eliminated. Their re-emergence heralds the creation of a mecha unit called the Sonic Divers, piloted by 3 young girls to counter this threat.

== Characters ==
=== Sky Girls ===
Otoha Sakurano (桜野 音羽, Sakurano Otoha)
Voiced by: Ayako Kawasumi
Otoha is the main master with the sword but is otherwise an unknown in her abilities. She comes from an island where her family runs a dojo. While on SkyMu, she is sweet and naive, in reality, she is feisty, violent, bossy, tough and a latecomer to the scene. She has a twin brother, who one day disappeared while sitting on a rock talking about flying together when a mass of light appeared. He appears later in the series proclaiming he is the WORMs' "messenger". Her Sonic Diver Unit is named Reijin, but she nicknames it "Zero".
Eika Ichijo (一条 瑛花, Ichijō Eika)
Voiced by: Shizuka Itō
Eika is the main leader of the team and is quick at making decisions, has fast reflexes, and high stamina. She has a good leadership and more mature than the other two pilots. She excels in overall ability, much more than the other two pilots. This makes her the perfect choice for leading the Sonic Diver Unit. She was skeptic of her teammates, but later she trust them and created a strong friendship between the Sky Girls. The other Sky Girls look up to her and follow her good examples. Overall, she has a serious personality and is a tsundere character.
Karen Sonomiya (園宮 可憐, Sonomiya Karen)
Voiced by: Saori Gotō
Karen is a genius with an IQ of 170 and is an authority on mechanics. She is a university-graduated girl at the age of 16 years. She has trouble talking to boys, as she can be quite shy around them. She has a mild crush on Takumi. Karen also enjoys writing letters to her older brother who works just outside the base as an architect and loves him very much.
Elise von Dietrich (エリーゼ·フォン·ディートリッヒ, Erīze fon Dītorihhi)
Voiced by: Ayumi Tsuji
Elise is the youngest pilot of the Sonic Diver Unit. She is the sole survivor after the WORMs destroyed the Eastern Europe base. Traumatized by that disaster, she suffers initial problems integrating into the Sky Girls unit, especially with Eika because of her "selfish brat" attitude. When she joins the team, her overall ability as Sonic Driver pilot is very good, although not as good as Eika. She flies the only mass-produced Sonic Diver unit built before WORMS destroyed the manufacturing facility. She was briefly seen in episode 6 of the television series, and is formally introduced in episode 11.
Aisha Krishnam (アイーシャ·クリシューマン, Aīsha Kurishūman)
Voiced by: Azusa Enoki
A mysterious, shy and emotionless girl of Indian origin whose late father conducted scientific work on nanotechnology connected to the origins of the WORMs. She has shown limited 'remote control' of the WORMs, as seen in the episode 20. At first, everyone feared her because her emotionless personality, Otoha being the only one who was very nice to her. Near the end of the series she becomes the fifth Sky Girl, and pilots the Sonic Diver Shunya.

=== Secondary characters ===
Souya Togo (冬后 蒼哉, Togo Souya)
Voiced by: Keiji Fujiwara
A former skilled combat pilot, he protected Zin Hizaki from a WORM's attack and injured his hands in the previous war against the WORMs and can no longer fly. Now he commands the 13th Aviation Corp (the Sonic Diver squadron). Eika is the squadron leader and his subordinate. His duties mostly revolve around training the pilots, relaying their orders from above and making sure the unit's needs are met. He is the only member aboard the Koryu that does not wear a traditional uniform. Instead he wears an old leather flight jacket with a winged skull on the back, a white shirt, and blue jeans. He also enjoys fishing (although he never catches anything). Although the three pilots see him as a non-sensitive man he actually really cares about them. The reason he is strict and stern to them is for their own good as pilots who drive unusual combat weapon.
Rei Hizuki (緋月 玲, Hizuki Rei)
Voiced by: Junji Majima
A quiet and secretive officer in charge of the Sonic Diver program at the Oppama Testing Facility. While Lt. Col. Togo outranks him, Lt. Hizuki's position in the program puts him above Togo. Unbeknown to the others, he is preparing the Sonic Divers to combat WORMs. He is an unsociable man who is not used to showing his true feelings giving him the appearance of a cold man.
Nanae Fujieda (藤枝 七恵, Fujieda Nanae)
Voiced by: Yui Horie
Lieutenant Hizuki's assistant until she is transferred with the Sonic Diver unit to the naval destroyer, Koryu. She collects and monitors Sonic Diver data. She is a reliable girl who is quick at her work. She is also shy and mousy but is known for having the largest breasts in the show. She was born on an island and has a younger sister named Hakashi and a childhood friend named Kurosawa Hiroharu whom they seem to have a mutual crush. A picture of her is featured every episode when advertising the sponsors.
Takumi Hayami (速水 たくみ, Hayami Takumi)
Voiced by: Ryōko Shiraishi
A kind boy who always smiles and gentle. He is the communications officer monitoring the Sonic Divers and any potential enemies. He helps out in the ship's galley as Chef Gen-san's assistant and enjoys photography as a hobby. He has a crush on Karen.
Ryohei Tachibana (橘 僚平, Tachibana Ryōhei)
Voiced by: Kishō Taniyama
The Sonic Diver specialist who work on Otoha's Reijin. He is a rough man and has a tendency to be a bit of a pervert, which Otoha scolds him for. He and Otoha develop a close bond, even though neither will admit it and they fight frequently.
Ranko Mikogami, Haruko Mikogami (御子神 嵐子, 御子神 晴子, Mikogami Ranko, Mikogami Haruko)
Voiced by: Kumiko Higa (Ranko) and Momoko Ishikawa (Haruko)
The two twin sisters are Sonic Diver mechanics. Ranko has pink hair, and is very outgoing and friendly, and is charged with maintenance on Eika's Raijin. Haruko has blue hair, a calm stoic demeanor and is in charge of Karen's Fujin.
Captain Seibi Oto (おと 整備, Oto Seibi)
Voiced by: Kan Tanaka
Chief Mechanic and supervises the other mechanics. Later he personally handles the maintenance on Elise's Sonic Diver, Bachstelze V1.
Admiral Kadowaki (門脇, Kadowaki)
Voiced by: Shinji Ogawa
Commander of the special naval destroyer no. 113, the Koryu.
Rear Admiral Shima (志摩, Shima)
Voiced by: Yutaka Aoyama
Second in command aboard Koryu. After experiencing the destructive capabilities of WORMs in the first war, he has serious doubts about the Sky Girls and the Sonic Diver program.
Doctor Yuko Aki (安芸 夕子, Aki Yūko)
Voiced by: Hitomi Nabatame
Doctor aboard the Koryu. She is a widow and has a son.
Chef Gen-san (ゲンさん, Gen-san)
Voiced by: Taketora
The Koryu's Chef. He is a hard taskmaster, giving his assistant, Takumi Hayami, plenty of work to do. However, the Chef develops a fatherly relationship with Elise, often pampering her and preparing her favorite dishes. This is because Elise looks very like his granddaughter.
Zin Hizaki (飛崎 陣, Hizaki Zin)
Voiced by: Junichi Suwabe
Pilot of the Vic Viper and old acquaintance of Togo. At first he is quite arrogant to the Sonic Diver pilots and looks down on the Sonic Divers which pisses off Otoha and Ryohei.
Kiriko Suou (周王 紀里子, Suō Kiriko)
Voiced by: Akiko Kimura
Ally of Rei Hizuki and guardian of Aisha. She supervises the WORM task force and the Sonic Diver program.
Admiral Ichijo (一条, Ichijō)
Eika's father. A high ranking naval commander with jurisdiction over the Sonic Diver and Vic Viper projects. He and his daughter Eika are very similar, but they don't get along. Because after Eika saw her father flying as a pilot, she herself wanted to be a pilot, but her father would not let her so she left the house. Because of that Eika always hates when other people mention her father and family and always scolds people when they mention them [her family].
Yuuki Sakurano (桜野 結城, Sakurano Yūki)
Voiced by: Miyuki Sawashiro
Otoha's twin younger brother who disappeared many years prior to the time depicted in the anime. Otoha loves her twin brother and before his disappearance they got along well and had the same dream to fly in the sky. Later it is known that his disappearance was caused by WORMs.

== Technology ==
These are fictional technologies unique to Sky Girls.

Weapon Of Raid Machines (WORMs)

Artificial life forms consisting entirely of thousands to millions of 'cells' approximately a foot in diameter, which are themselves created by nanotechnology. These come together to form large monsters that wreak havoc. WORMs are responsible for the destruction of one-third of human population.

WORMs mimic the appearance of the first lifeform they see, which is why almost all of them have similarities with maritime lifeforms.

Sonic Divers

Sonic Divers are a new technology where a pilot with sufficient innate ability and compatibility controls an exoskeleton that can fly and combat WORMs. The pilots are exposed to air inside the Sonic Divers.

Aside from the default "G" mode (glider mode), which is similar to a fighter plane, the Sonic Divers have a humanoid mode called "Mode A" (armor mode), in which the Sonic Diver mimics its pilot's movements.

Every Sonic Diver unit has different weapons:

- Sonic Diver Raijin is armed with pairs of gatling guns, rocket launchers and energy cannons, giving it a great variety of ranged attacks.
- Sonic Diver Reijin is armed with shoulder-mounted laser guns and a MV Sword, a katana with a vibrating blade.
- Sonic Diver Fujin is armed with a rocket launcher that fires missile clusters. It is also equipped with additional tactical sensors.
- Sonic Diver Bachstelze V is armed with arm mounted laser guns and a one-handed polearm called "MV Lanze" ("Lanze" is a German term for "lance"). Guidance allows it to be thrown like a boomerang.
- Sonic Diver Shunya is a customized Diver similar to Reijin. It has no fixed weapons, but can carry a rifle weapon in each hand.

Aside from these weapons, most of the Sonic Diver units seem to be equipped with either a machine gun or a pistol as a backup weapon.

In Episode 17, it is shown that the Sonic Divers are capable of independent movement. While they don't seem to be able to fight all by themselves, they can follow simple orders given to them by their pilot.

Pilot suit

A form-fitting flight suit that resembles a very thin one-piece swimsuit. When used in combination with a nanoskin, a data circuit is created between pilot and sonic diver. The pilot can then operate the Sonic Diver until the nanoskin degrades.

Nanoskin

To protect the pilot during operation of the Sonic Diver, a nanoskin gel is applied over the entire skin. This is made up of nanomachines. This coating lasts only for exactly 21 minutes and 32 seconds, but during that time the body is protected from the rigors of both flight and combat. Piloting it in the absence of a nanoskin gel is referred to as extremely dangerous and probably fatal.

Delta Lock and Quadra Formation

An aerial combat procedure where a weakened WORM is surrounded by three (Delta Lock) or four (Quadra Formation) Sonic Divers. The Sonic Divers attack the WORM and sync themselves to the nanomachines that comprise the WORM's body. The nanomachines become unstable and begin to disintegrate. The WORM can then be destroyed.

== Episodes ==
The English translations of each episode title are unofficial, and neither the OVA nor the TV series have been licensed for foreign release.

No.	English title Japanese title
0	"Sky Girls OVA" "Sukai Gāruzu OVA" (スカイガールズ OVA)
A direct-to-video animation story introducing the Sky Girls. This precedes the Sky Girls TV series and differs slightly from it. Eika, Otoha and Karen are stationed on a naval destroyer and are about to face their first WORM. There is no fourth Sky Girl.
1	"Candidates" "Kōho-sha-tachi" (候補者たち)
Three young girls are recruited to become test pilots for the new Sonic Diver program.
2	"Sonic Diver" "Sonikku Daibā" (ソニックダイバー)
The girls travel to the military base and are introduced to each other and the other base personnel.
3	"Flight" "Hishō" (飛翔)
Eika performs the team's first test flight of a Sonic Diver.
4	"The Holiday's Corner Alley" "Kyūjitsu no Machikado" (休日の街角)
After all the girls have flown their Sonic Divers, it's their first pay day, and first day off. They meet a new friend, Takumi Hayami.
5	"Look After Me, Zero!" "Yoroshiku! Zero" (よろしく! ゼロ)
The girls learn to fly as a team. Otoha has trouble with the shooting practice.
6	"Nanae's Secret" "Nanae no Himitsu" (七恵の秘密)
Elise survives the destruction of the West Europe base. Back at Oppama base, Otoha finds a large bra and MUST find the owner. And the girls have a surprise in their combat simulators.
7	"Naming The Sky Girls" "Meimei, Sukai Gāruzu" (命名、スカイガールズ)
It's time for the girls to debut at the Oppama Air Festival, and they need a team name. The prototype fighter plane, the Vic Viper, debuts and its pilot causes the girls difficulties.
8	"Let's Go To A Hot Spring" "Onsen e Ikō!" (温泉へ行こう!)
Fun and trouble at the local hot spring. The girls learn the truth about the Sonic Diver program.
9	"Delta Lock" "Deruta Rokku" (デルタロック)
The girls learn how to perform the "Delta Lock", a combat maneuver which traps the enemy WORM into a field where its cells collapse and can be destroyed. They also experience their first combat with a real WORM. Karen gets shot down and suffers a concussion and sprained arm.
10	"Ghost Base" "Gōsuto Bēsu" (ゴーストベース)
The girls chase down rumors of a ghost on the base.
11	"Fourth Sky Girl" "4 Hitome no Shōjō" (4人目の少女)
The girls meet Elise, a Sonic Diver pilot from the destroyed West Europe base.
12	"Good-Bye, Oppama" "Sayonara Oppama" (さよなら追浜)
Karen schedules a meeting with her older brother, but must miss it when she's called on a rescue mission. The Sky Girls team is moved from the base to a special-purpose ship called the Koryu.
13	"Koryu, Move Out!" "Koryū Shukkō" (攻龍出港)
The Sky Girls team settles into its new home at sea. Ryohei becomes seasick, preventing him from working on Reijin. When a WORM approaches the ship, Otoha is unable to launch, until Ryohei overcomes his illness and repairs their Sonic Diver.
14	"Quadra Lock" "Kuadora Rokku" (クアドラロック)
The Sky Girls battle as a group of four for the first time but Elise, occupied by vengeance, has problems working together as part of a team. Vic Viper is involved in its first battle against a WORM, albeit briefly.
15	"Father and Daughter" "Chicho to Musume to" (父と娘と)
The military's strategy against the WORMs and their plan for the Sky Girls is made clearer. The Koryu is ordered towards a supposed location of a nest of WORMs. Eika's Father faints from over working. Eika's past is somewhat revealed as well.
16	"Stopping at a Port" "Kikō" (寄港)
The Koryu docks at a small island, which happens to be Nanae's home. Nanae is reunited with her childhood friend, Kurosawa Hiroharu, but lies about her job when he displays hostilities toward her ship. He finds out when a WORM attacks, he's saved by the Sky Girls.
17	"The South Island of the Sky Girls" "Minami no Shima no Sukai Gāruzu" (南の島のスカイガールズ)
The Girls become stranded on an island in the south Pacific and have to battle internal fissures that have not fully healed until they are rescued.
18	"Intruder" "Shinnyū-sha" (侵入者)
A new smaller WORM invades the Koryu.
19	"Aisha Chronicle" "Aīsha・Kuronikkuru" (アイーシャ・クロニクル)
Elise is suspicious of Aisha. The Sky Girls learn the origins of the WORMs.
20	"First Impression of that Find" "Sono Faindā ni Utsuru Mono" (そのファインダーに映るもの)
Takumi finds some camera film. Otoha and the crew get to know Aisha. A new faster WORM attacks.
21	"United Front" "Kyōtō" (共闘)
A Vic Viper squadron attacks a WORM with a self-recovery ability. Togo's backstory is also further explained.
22	"Southern Cross - Holy Night" "Sazan Kuroshu・Hōrī Naito" (サザンクロス・ホーリーナイト)
Koryu holds a Christmas party celebration. A portion of Otoha's first encounter with WORMs is further revealed. A WORM in the shape of Otoha's long-lost brother makes a dramatic appearance.
23	"Lost Wing" "Ushina Wareta Tsubasa" (失われた翼)
Otoha deals with the ramifications of her brother having been resurrected by the WORMs.
24	"Fight" "Kessen" (決戦)
The crew of the Koryu prepare themselves for their last battle with the WORMs.
25	"Otoha, once again." "Otoha, Futatabi" (音羽、ふたたび)
All five Sky Girls and the Vic Viper squadrons engage in the final battle against the WORMs' nest.
26	"The Next Time" "Sorezore no…" (それぞれの…)
The story catches up on the Sky Girls' lives six months after the WORMs were defeated and Aisha wake's up.

== TV DVD specials ==
Episode	Title
1	"Fierce Battle! Trout Fishing Contest"
2	"Big Catch! Mudskipper Fishing!"
3	"Seashore Battle! Blackfish Fishing!"
4	"Astonishing! Piranha Fishing!"
5	"Protect the indigenous species! Bass Fishing Contest! Please finish eating the fish that you've caught!"
6	"Fish the porgy with prawns, Black Porgy Fishing!"
7	"The porgy's really tough! Getting poorer by the day! Red tai fishing!"
8	"Tempura, deep-fried food, and sometimes, skates! Pond smelt fishing on top of ice!"
9	"There's no part that should be thrown away! Great battle with the whale of the great deep!"

== Theme songs and soundtrack albums ==
Opening Song (OP):

- "Baby's Tears" by Riyu Kosaka (OVA) (This song also appears in the Japanese PlayStation 2 version of the music video game Dance Dance Revolution SuperNova and SuperNova 2 in the North American PlayStation 2 version and the arcade version of Dance Dance Revolution SuperNova 2.)
- "Virgin's High!" by Mell (anime television series)

Ending Song (ED):

- "Shooting Star ~Negai o Komete~" (「Shooting Star⁓願いをこめて⁓」) by Saori Gotō (OVA)
- "True Blue" by Saori Gotō (anime television series, episodes 1–13)
- "Diamond Sparkle" by Azusa Kataoka (anime television series, episodes 14–26)

== Other media ==
Several characters from the series saw releases as action figures in Konami's MMS line.

The series has had a collaboration with the Busou Shinki arcade game Battle Conductor which had Sonic Divers usable as equipment.

The series has had a long-running series of pachinko machines, with three lines: Sky Girls: Yoroshiku! Zero (2013), Sky Girls: Zero Futatabi (2015), and Sky Girls: Zero no Tsubasa (2020).
