= List of Girls und Panzer characters =

Girls und Panzer is a 2012 Japanese anime television series created by Actas, directed by Tsutomu Mizushima, and produced by Kiyoshi Sugiyama. It depicts a competition between girls' high schools practicing tank warfare as a sport called "sensha-dō" (戦車道; lit. 'the way of the tank'), the art of operating tanks. The English dub refers to the sport as "tankery."

== Ooarai Girls High School ==
The students of Ooarai Girls High School as of the Girls und Panzer der Film OVA "Alice War!"

Ōarai Prefectural Girls High School (県立大洗女子学園, Kenritsu Ōarai Joshi Gakuen) is a school ship stationed in Ōarai, Ibaraki. Ōarai's Sensha-dō team was abolished years ago, and has just been restarted as the series begins, so they are forced to make do with whatever leftover tanks they have been able to find. As a result, unlike most other teams, they field a hodgepodge of tanks from various countries. The school insignia is the two kanji for Ōarai (大洗) superimposed atop one another in stylized form. The school ship of Ōarai Girls High School is based on the IJN Shōkaku-class aircraft carrier. They also use a transport ship that looks quite similar to the Japanese battleship Mikasa. The series focuses upon Ōarai's Sensha-dō players, who are divided into teams.

=== Anglerfish Team ===
The main protagonists make up the Anglerfish Team (あんこうチーム, Ankō Chīmu) of Ōarai Girls High School's Sensha-dō team, with Miho serving as commander. They were assigned the German Panzer IV Ausf. D, armed with the short-barreled 75mm KwK 37 L/24 gun that is mostly used for infantry support. The tank was later upgraded to a Panzer IV Ausf. F2 when they found a long-barreled 75mm KwK 40 L/43 anti-tank cannon which was being used to hang clothes out to dry. It was upgraded again to Ausf. H, called the "Mk IV Special" in the series, for the Sensha-dō tournament finals match by adding "Schürzen" spaced armour.

Miho Nishizumi (西住 みほ, Nishizumi Miho)
Voiced by: Mai Fuchigami (Japanese); Margaret McDonald (English)
Commander-in-chief of the Ōarai Sensha-dō team and captain of Anglerfish Team.
A second-year student, she is the anime's main protagonist. Miho is a girl who comes from a long line of tank operators. Previously she attended Kuromorimine and commanded the flag tank, a Tiger I, in the national championships a year ago against Pravda. However, after she abandoned it to rescue the crew of another tank that had fallen into a river, her tank was knocked out. This ended a nine year winning streak by Kuromorimine and Miho subsequently avoided Sensha-dō and transferred to Ōarai Girls Academy specifically because it did not have Sensha-dō. However, after Sensha-dō is revived by the school, Miho is forced by the student council to take it up again due to her being the only student with actual Sensha-dō experience. She starts to enjoy Sensha-dō after spending time with her new friends. Although shy and reluctant, she is a good strategist.
Saori Takebe (武部 沙織, Takebe Saori)
Voiced by: Ai Kayano (Japanese); Jessica Calvello (English)
Radio operator and machine gunner of Anglerfish Team.
A red-haired girl who is interested in seeking out good-looking men, but is often left disappointed. She has a cheerful personality and is very talkative, but gives the impression to others that she has more experience than is actually the case. She is one of the two girls who befriended Miho during her first day. In the Das Finale series, she has become the Student Council's new PR Manager.
Hana Isuzu (五十鈴 華, Isuzu Hana)
Voiced by: Mami Ozaki (Japanese); Caitlynn French (English)
Gunner of Anglerfish Team.
Initially the tank driver, she becomes the gunner after experiencing the thrill of shots being fired. She is also one of the two girls who befriended Miho during her first day. Hana comes from a family which traditionally practices the art of flower arrangement ikebana. In the Das Finale film series, upon the graduation of the old student council, she is elected Student Council President.
Yukari Akiyama (秋山 優花里, Akiyama Yukari)
Voiced by: Ikumi Nakagami (Japanese); Rebekah Stevens (English)
Loader of Anglerfish Team.
An excitable girl who is obsessed with tanks, militaria and military field survival techniques, though this often led her to be very lonely during her childhood. Having been inspired by Miho, Yukari joined the Sensha-dō team and became friends with her. Was originally Anglerfish Team's gunner, but later volunteered for the loader position. She admires Miho, and even calls her "Nishizumi-dono". In the Das Finale film series, she has advanced to the rank of Student Council Vice-President.
Mako Reizei (冷泉 麻子, Reizei Mako)
Voiced by: Yuka Iguchi (Japanese); Molly Searcy (English)
Driver of Anglerfish Team.
Despite having extremely good grades, she is always late to school as she has low blood pressure and a habit of falling asleep anywhere; for this reason, she hates getting up early. She joins Anglerfish Team as the driver after the team come across her during their first practice battle. Being the smartest student in the class, she is able to read the manual of any tank on the fly and drive it perfectly.

=== Turtle Team ===
The Turtle Team (カメさんチーム, Kame-san Chīmu) is made up of the school's student council and uses the Czech Panzer 38(t), until episode 10 of the anime when it is converted into a Hetzer tank destroyer atop the chassis of the 38(t) (due to lack of budget to buy a replacement tank). The three girls' given names are the names of fruits in Japanese.

Anzu Kadotani (角谷 杏, Kadotani Anzu)
Voiced by: Misato Fukuen (Japanese); Rozie Curtis, Christina Stroup (das Finale) (English)
Turtle Team's tank commander/radio operator.
As the president of the high school's student council, she is known as seitokaicho, or more simply kaicho. She is manipulative, childish, carefree and a glutton all at once. She forced Miho to participate in Sensha-dō, saying that if Miho did not, she would see to it that she would not be attending the school next year. Later, it is revealed that she did this because the school is at risk of being closed should they not win the tournament. She is often seen eating dried sweet potatoes. On occasion, she will take over the gunner's spot in the tank and ends up being a much better shot than Momo.
Momo Kawashima (河嶋 桃, Kawashima Momo)
Voiced by: Kana Ueda (Japanese); Kendall McClellan (TV Series, This Is the Real Anzio Battle!), Patricia Duran (der Film), Elizabeth Maxwell (das Finale) (English)
Turtle Team's gunner/loader.
She is the Student Council PR Manager and a third year student. Her family runs a stationery store. Although she largely appears composed and calm, she loses her temper easily, and her aim is poor when she is angry. Despite her short temper, she is sensitive and easily breaks down. She is only seen smiling once in a picture and briefly during the second OVA. In the Das Finale film series, she is made Commander of the Ooarai Sensha-dō team in order to earn a Sensha-dō-based scholarship to university.
Yuzu Koyama (小山 柚子, Koyama Yuzu)
Voiced by: Mikako Takahashi (Japanese); Maeghan Avocato, Serena Varghese (das Finale) (English)
Turtle Team's driver.
She is the Student Council Vice-President and a third year student. She is a brown-haired, well-endowed girl who works mostly in the Student Council, doing all the work Anzu leaves to her.

=== Duck Team ===
The Duck Team (アヒルさんチーム, Ahiru-san Chīmu) is composed of former volleyball club members and uses the Japanese Type 89B.

Noriko Isobe (磯辺 典子, Isobe Noriko)
Voiced by: Mika Kikuchi (Japanese); Genevieve Simmons (TV, das Finale), Chelsea McCurdy (der Film) (English)
The team's tank commander and loader. She is also the manager of the volleyball club.
Taeko Kondō (近藤 妙子, Kondō Taeko)
Voiced by: Maya Yoshioka (Japanese); Kalin Coates (English)
The team's radio operator. She wears a red band around her head.
Shinobu Kawanishi (河西 忍, Kawanishi Shinobu)
Voiced by: Mari Kirimura (Japanese); Cynthia Martinez (English)
The team's driver. She has a positive personality, but she also gets angry easily.
Akebi Sasaki (佐々木 あけび, Sasaki Akebi)
Voiced by: Sakura Nakamura (Japanese); Carli Mosier (English)
The team's gunner. She is very sensitive and cries easily, although she is also calm and patient.

=== Hippo Team ===
The Hippo Team (カバさんチーム, Kaba-san Chīmu) is composed of reki-jo (history buffs) and operates a German Sturmgeschütz III Ausf. F.

Caesar (カエサル, Kaesaru) / Takako Suzuki (鈴木 貴子, Suzuki Takako)
Voiced by: Eri Sendai (Japanese); Shannon Emerick (English)
The team's loader and co-commander.
Her nickname "Caesar" refers to Julius Caesar, and she wears a red focale like Roman soldiers.
Erwin (エルヴィン, Eruvin) / Riko Matsumoto (松本 里子, Matsumoto Riko), nicknamed "Erwin"
Voiced by: Satomi Moriya (Japanese); Luci Christian (English)
The team's tank commander/radio operator.
Her nickname "Erwin" is a reference to Field Marshal Erwin Rommel, and she typically wears a peaked cap and desert tan field jacket. She's a fan of World War II.

Saemonza (左衛門佐) / Kiyomi Sugiyama (杉山 清美, Sugiyama Kiyomi)
Voiced by: Yuka Inoue (Japanese); Tiffany Terrell, Joanne Bonasso (das Finale) (English)
The team's gunner.
Her nickname "Saemonza" refers to Sanada Saemon-no-Suke Yukimura, whose banner (with six golden coins instead of black ones) she habitually wears as a headband. She is often seen with her left eye closed. She is adept at archery and knows a lot about the Sengoku Period.
Oryō (おりょう, Oryō) / Takeko Nogami (野上 武子, Nogami Takeko)
Voiced by: Ayuru Ōhashi (Japanese); Nancy Novotny, Elisa Cuellar (das Finale) (English)
The team's driver.
Her nickname "Oryō" refers to Narasaki Ryō. She's a fan of Bakumatsu.

=== Rabbit Team ===
The Rabbit Team (ウサギさんチーム, Usagi-san Chīmu) is composed of six first-year students and uses an American M3 Lee.

Azusa Sawa (澤 梓, Sawa Azusa)
Voiced by: Hitomi Takeuchi (Japanese); Allison Sumrall (English)
The team's tank commander.
Karina Sakaguchi (阪口 桂利奈, Sakaguchi Karina)
Voiced by: Konomi Tada (Japanese); Monica Rial (English)
The team's driver.
She tends to rush headlong into action without thinking about the consequences.
Yūki Utsugi (宇津木 優季, Utsugi Yūki)
Voiced by: Yuri Yamaoka (Japanese); Maggie Flecknoe (English)
The team's radio operator.

Ayumi Yamagō (山郷 あゆみ, Yamagō Ayumi)
Voiced by: Nozomi Nakazato (Japanese); Savannah Menzel (TV, das Finale), Katelyn Barr (der Film) (English)
The team's loader and gunner.
Saki Maruyama (丸山 紗希, Maruyama Saki)
Voiced by: Mikako Komatsu (Japanese); Kara Greenberg (English)
The team's loader.
She very rarely speaks. She likes kombucha.
Aya Ōno (大野 あや, Ōno Aya)
Voiced by: Akina (Japanese); Juliet Simmons (English)
The team's gunner.
Her glasses break frequently.

=== Mallard Team ===
The Mallard Team (カモさんチーム, Kamo-san Chīmu) is composed of the three members of Ōarai's Public Morals Committee (also called Hall Monitors in the English dub) and uses the French Renault Char B1 Bis. In the anime series, they make their debut in the semi-finals against Pravda, while in the manga they join the competition one round earlier, against Anzio.

Midoriko Sono (園 みどり子, Sono Midoriko)
Voiced by: Shiori Izawa (Japanese); Tiffany Grant (English)
The team's tank commander and radio operator, as well as the gunner/loader for the tank's turret-mounted 47mm gun. She is often seen taking attendance at the school entrance, and constantly reprimands Mako for showing up late. She becomes irritated when other characters call her by her nickname Sodoko (そど子) (after Sodom).

Moyoko Gotō (後藤 モヨ子, Gotō Moyoko)
Voiced by: Shiori Izawa (Japanese); Shelley Calene-Black (English)
The team's driver. Her nickname is Gomoyo (ゴモヨ) (after Gomorrah).
Nozomi Konparu (金春 希美, Konparu Nozomi)
Voiced by: Shiori Izawa (Japanese); Emily Neves (English)
The team's gunner/loader for the tank's hull-mounted 75mm gun. Her nickname is Pazomi (ぱぞ美) (after Pasolini).

=== Anteater Team ===
The Anteater Team (アリクイさんチーム, Arikui-san Chīmu) is formed of a group of nerdy girls who often play online tank battle games; they actually meet each other in real life for the first time when they form a team for the Sensha-dō finals. They drive a Japanese Type 3 Chi-Nu medium tank.

Nekonyā (ねこにゃー) / Mai Nekota (猫田 舞)
Voiced by: Ikumi Hayama (Japanese); Natalie Rial (English)
The team's tank commander and radio operator, who often sports huge swirly glasses and cat ears. She is the one who approaches Miho about joining the Sensha-dō team and inviting her online friends to join them.
Momogā (ももがー) / Taki Momose (百瀬 多希)
Voiced by: Masayo Kurata (Japanese); Olivia Swasey (TV, das Finale), Karlii Hoch (der Film) (English)
The team's driver, who wears a peach shaped eyepatch.
Piyotan (ぴよたん) / Aoi Hiyoshi (日吉 葵)
Voiced by: Sumire Uesaka (Japanese); Maggie Flecknoe, Amelia Fischer (das Finale) (English)
The team's gunner and loader.

=== Leopon Team ===
The Leopon Team (レオポンさんチーム, Reopon-san Chīmu) consists of Ōarai's automotive club, who often do repairs on the tanks in between matches. They join the finals match, driving a prototype tank that the Rabbit team found in episode 7. The tank is a Tiger (P), also known as Porsche Tiger, which sports a 88mm KwK L/56 gun. It also has a faulty drive system that has been known to overheat, but its crew makes modifications to the tank in their spare time. The girls' given names are based on famous Japanese racing drivers.

Rera Nakajima (中嶋 麗羅)
Voiced by: Nozomi Yamamoto (Japanese); Beth Lazarou (TV), Tiffany Grant (der Film), Juliet Simmons (das Finale) (English)
Team's tank commander and radio operator.
She is named after Satoru Nakajima, Japan's first full-time Formula One driver.
Keiko Hoshino (星野 慶子)
Voiced by: Hisako Kanemoto (Japanese); Diane Gallagher (TV, der Film), Chaney Moore (das Finale) (English)
Team's gunner.
She is named after Kazuyoshi Hoshino, "The fastest man in Japan".

Maria Suzuki (鈴木 真莉阿)
Voiced by: Mai Ishihara (Japanese); Brittney Karbowski (English)
Team's loader.
Her dream is to have her own shensha-dō's team.
Muuton Tsuchiya (土屋 夢屯)
Voiced by: Eri Kitamura (Japanese); Luci Christian (English)
Team's driver.
She is named after the legendary "Drift King" Keiichi Tsuchiya.

=== Shark Team ===
The Shark Team (サメさんチーム, Same-san chīmu) consists of five girls from Bar Donzoko, which is located in the lowest part of Ōarai's ship, a virtual slum region housing the most delinquent members of the Naval Studies Department. The team joins because they owe a favor to Momo Kawashima, who let them stay on the ship despite their escapades and academic failures. Their emblem, as well as most of their clothes and names have a sailor/pirate motif. Their tank is a British Mark IV, the oldest tank ever to operate in the series thus far, and they join during the events of the Das Finale film series.

Ogin (お銀) nicknamed "Tornado" (竜巻 Tatsumaki).
Voiced by: Ayane Sakura (Japanese); Dawn M. Bennett (English)
Team's tank commander. Smokes a pipe. Has short, dark hair that tends to cover one eye.
Rum (ラム)
Voiced by: Natsumi Takamori (Japanese); Sarah Wiedenheft (English) nicknamed "Explosive Cyclone"
Team's driver. Often carrying or drinking from a bottle of rum. Has red, curly hair.
Murakami (ムラカミ) nicknamed "Sargasso" (サルガッソ Sarugasso)
Voiced by: Yō Taichi (Japanese); Morgan Berry (English)
Team's starboard gunner and loader. Is heavyset/muscular and has long, dark hair.

Flint (フリント) nicknamed "Great Waves"
Voiced by: Madoka Yonezawa (Japanese); Amber Lee Connors (English)
Team's radio operator and co-driver. Is thin and has very long, white hair.
Cutlass (カトラス) nicknamed "Fresh Whitebait Rice Bowl"
Voiced by: Ami Nanase (Japanese); Alyssa Marek (English)
Team's port gunner and loader. Has short, blonde hair.

== (Germany) Kuromorimine Girls High School ==
Kuromorimine Girls High School (黒森峰女学園, Kuromorimine Jogakuen) is a German-style academy from Kumamoto Prefecture. It was the national champion nine times running until their defeat the previous year by Pravda. Their tanks include the Tiger I, Tiger II, Panzer III, Jagdpanzer IVs, Panther tanks, Jagdpanther, Elefant, Jagdtiger and Panzer VIII Maus. The school insignia is an Iron Cross with the kanji for Kuromorimine (黒森峰; lit. "black forest peak") superimposed on top. The school themes include Erika and the Panzerlied. The school ship of Kuromorimine Girls High School is based on the Kriegsmarine aircraft carrier Graf Zeppelin. In the film, they are also shown to have a LZ 127 Graf Zeppelin class airship.

Maho Nishizumi (西住 まほ, Nishizumi Maho)
Voiced by: Rie Tanaka (Japanese); Kim Prause (English)
Kuromorimine's commander and Miho's older sister who commands a Tiger I tank. Though often cold and expressionless, she does seem to acknowledge Miho's strength. Since the Nishizumi school is passed from mother to daughter she is expected to inherit the school and carry out the Nishizumi style of Sensha-dō when their mother steps down. It is revealed in "Little Army" that she acts aloof because it is expected of her as the Nishizumi heir, and she plays that role so that Miho can find her own way of Sensha-dō as the Nishizumi style is too cold, strict and unfeeling for her. Despite her facade, Maho apologizes to Miho when she upsets her by acting coldly, and is disturbed by their mother's planning to disown Miho. After her defeat against Miho, Maho accepts her loss and is pleased that Miho has found her own way of Sensha-dō. During Ooarai's game against the University Team, Maho comes to her sister's aid with multiple tanks, exploiting a loophole in the rules to help Miho fight. The two work together to defeat Alice in a tense final battle, securing victory.
Erika Itsumi (逸見 エリカ, Itsumi Erika)
Voiced by: Hitomi Nabatame (Japanese); Elizabeth Bannor, Katelyn Barr (das Finale) (English)
Kuromorimine's second-in-command, who criticizes Miho and the Ōarai team more openly and vocally than Maho. She takes Sensha-dō very seriously, viewing it as almost sacred, and looks down on Miho and her friends, believing they might bring shame to the name of Sensha-dō. Following Maho's graduation, she assumes leadership of the Kuromorimine team. Is able to pilot a Fa 223 and formerly commanded a Tiger II tank, now commanding a Panzer III.
Koume Akaboshi (赤星 小梅, Koume Akaboshi)
Voiced by: Eri Sendai
A tank commander, whose team was rescued by Miho while she was still attending Kuromorimine, a deed which led to Miho's transfer to Ooarai.
Emi Kozima (小島 エミ, Kozima Emi)
Voiced by: Ikumi Hayama
She commands a Jagdpanther.
Anna Iruma (入間 アンナ, Iruma Anna)
Voiced by: Sumire Uesaka

== (United Kingdom) St. Gloriana Girls Academy ==
St. Gloriana Girls Academy (聖グロリアーナ女学院, Sei Guroriāna Jogakuin) is a British-style academy from Kanagawa Prefecture, where the girls are often seen drinking tea even in combat. They make use of four Matilda II Mk. III/IV tanks and one Churchill Mk. VII tank as their command tank. Images of the school utilizing a Cromwell tank also appear in supplementary materials for the anime. In the film, they also utilize up to four Crusader tanks. Their insignia is a shield containing an image of a tea set with Hibiscus syriacus flowers. St. Gloriana faced Ōarai in a practice match prior to the national tournament but was not matched up against them in the latter. They give a tea set as a gift for opponents they deemed worthy. Their battle theme is The British Grenadiers, and the members introduced are named after different types of tea. The school ship of St. Gloriana Girls Academy is based on the Royal Navy aircraft carrier HMS Ark Royal (91).

Darjeeling (ダージリン, Dājirin)
Voiced by: Eri Kitamura (Japanese); Kara Greenberg (English)
A senior at St. Gloriana and the commanding officer of St. Gloriana's Sensha-dō teams. She commands a Churchill tank, and does not believe in using dirty tactics in a match. She has a distinctively refined manner of speech, is fond of telling jokes and quoting sayings, and is often seen with a cup of tea in her hand. Following St. Gloriana's match against Ōarai, she comes to respect Miho's tactical skills and becomes a frequent spectator at Ōarai's Sensha-dō matches afterwards. Her name refers to Darjeeling tea.
Assam (アッサム, Assamu)
Voiced by: Satomi Akesaka (Japanese); Joanne Bonasso (English)
A senior at St. Gloriana and the gunner of Darjeeling's tank. Distinctive for her rolling, long locks of blonde hair, she is quiet and is usually seen smiling. Her name refers to Assam tea.
Orange Pekoe (オレンジペコ, Orenjipeko)
Voiced by: Mai Ishihara (Japanese); Ally Piotrowski, (das Finale) (English)
A freshman at St. Gloriana and the loader of Darjeeling's tank. She is often seen in the company of Darjeeling as a spectator at Ōarai's Sensha-dō matches. Her name refers to Orange pekoe.
Rukuriri (ルクリリ)
Voiced by: Masayo Kurata (Japanese); Lauren Hernik (der Film) (English)
She commands a Matilda II tank. Her name refers to Rukuriri tea from Kenya.
Rosehip (ローズヒップ)
Voiced by: Natsumi Takamori (Japanese); Stephanie Wittels, Emily Neves (das Finale) (English)
A character introduced in the film. She commands a Crusader Mk.III tank. Appears impatient and less refined as compared to her more prim and proper teammates. Her name refers to Rose Hip tea.
Alice Shimada (島田 愛里寿, Shimada Arisu)
Former leader of the University Strengthened Team, who transferred to St. Gloriana during the events of the film series.

== (United States) Saunders University High School ==
Saunders University High School (サンダース大学付属高校, Sandāsu Daigaku Fuzoku Kōkō) is an American-style academy from Nagasaki Prefecture. Out of all the Sensha-dō schools they have the most resources and a huge supply of tanks. They own numerous M4 Sherman tanks, including variants such as the Sherman Firefly and the M4A6 Sherman. They also own a C-5M Super Galaxy transport aircraft. Their battle themes are The Battle Hymn of the Republic and the US Field Artillery. Their insignia is a lightning bolt and five-pointed star atop a shield. The school ship of Saunders University High School is based on the US Navy Nimitz-class aircraft carrier as an homage to the USS George Washington (CVN-73), the US Navy carrier deployed in Japan at the time.

Kay (ケイ, Kei)
Voiced by: Ayako Kawasumi (Japanese); Emily Neves (English)
The energetic commander of the Saunders Sensha-dō team, portrayed as a stereotypical American, who is loud, boisterous, charismatic, and laid back. She believes that Sensha-dō is not war and believes in fair play.
Naomi (ナオミ, Naomi)
Voiced by: Mariya Ise (Japanese); Stephanie Wittels (der Film), Shelley Calene-Black (das Finale) (English)
One of the Saunders Sensha-dō sub-commanders and a Sherman Firefly gunner, specialized in distance shooting. She is calm and cool, often seen chewing gum while sniping her targets.
Alisa (アリサ, Arisa)
Voiced by: Aya Hirano (Japanese); Brittney Karbowski (English)
A manipulative sub-commander of the Saunders Sensha-dō team, who uses every advantage she can get to win, including wire-tapping radio communications by her adversaries, which backfires during the match against Ōarai in the first round of the national championship when they realize her trick. In the occasion, she commanded the flag tank.

== (Russia) Pravda High School ==
Pravda High School (プラウダ高校, Purauda Kōkō) is a Soviet-style academy from Aomori Prefecture and the current Sensha-dō champions. The name Pravda (Cyrillic: Правда) literally translates as "truth" in Russian, and refers to the Soviet newspaper Pravda. Their insignia consists of two overlapping steel squares crossed with a T-square and small scissors on top, imitating the hammer and sickle design of the flag of the Soviet Union. A red four-pointed star on their uniform is an imitation of the Red Army's five-pointed star. Their battle songs are Polyushko-polye and Katyusha. They make use of several T-34/76 and T-34/85 medium tanks, but also use heavy tanks like the IS-2 and KV-2. They have a Katyusha rocket launcher, though it is not used during battle, and instead is used for Katyusha and Nonna to get around. The school ship of Pravda High School is based on the Kiev-class aircraft carrier. They also own a Zubr-class LCAC, as shown in the film.

Katyusha (カチューシャ, Kachūsha)
Voiced by: Hisako Kanemoto (Japanese); Hilary Haag (English)
Pravda's commander. Katyusha is a spoiled and arrogant girl who suffers from Napoleon complex due to her diminutive size and thus tends to look down on her opponents, often having Nonna give her a ride on her shoulders so she can be above others. However, she is also a capable strategist and charismatic leader, proven by her school's successes during Sensha-dō and the absolute loyalty of her comrades. Despite appearing as mean and aggressive, she still shows good sportsmanship, as seen when she shakes hands with and compliments Miho.
Nonna (ノンナ, Nonna)
Voiced by: Sumire Uesaka (Japanese); Shannon Emerick, Olga Jankowski (das Finale) (English)
Pravda's second-in-command who has a calm and cool demeanor, hardly showcasing any emotions and follows every order of Katyusha. She and her commander also share a deep bond, as Nonna acts very motherly toward Katyusha and can even correct her without being yelled at much. In tankery, Nonna is a very accurate sniper who hardly ever misses. She speaks fluent Russian and habitually communicates with Klara in Russian, which prompts a scolding from Katyusha. (Sumire Uesaka, the voice actress who played Nonna in the Japanese version, majored in Russian language.)
Klara (Клара) (クラーラ, Clara)
Voiced by: Jenya (Japanese); Olga Jankowski, Sarah Natochenny (das Finale) (English)
A character introduced in the 2015 movie "Girls und Panzer der Film". She is the commander of a T-34-85 medium tank. Although she can speak fluent Japanese, she prefers to converse in Russian, her mother tongue, much to the chagrin of Katyusha, who has not learned that language.
Nina (ニーナ, Nina)
Voiced by: Saki Ogasawara (Japanese); Olivia Swasey ((TV Series, This Is the Real Anzio Battle!)), Karlii Hoch (der Film) (English)
A character introduced in the OVA "Snow War!". She is a loader of Pravda's KV-2.
Alina (アリーナ, Alina)
Voiced by: Kanami Satō (Japanese); Natalie Rial (English)
A loader of Pravda's KV-2 introduced in the OVA "Snow War!".

== (Italy) Anzio High School ==
Anzio High School (アンツィオ高校, Antsio Kōkō) is an Italian style private academy (founded to promote Italian culture in Japan) from Aichi Prefecture which uses the Carro Armato P40, L3/33, Semovente 75/18, and Fiat M13/40. The school insignia is a pizza. It is named after the Battle of Anzio. Their battle songs are Funiculì, Funiculà, a popular Neapolitan song, and Fiamme Nere (Black Flames), Arditi's battle march. The school ship of Anzio High School is based on the Italian aircraft carrier Aquila.

Anchovy (アンチョビ, Anchobi)
Voiced by: Maya Yoshioka (Japanese); Kira Vincent-Davis (English)
"Duce" Anchovy is Anzio's commander, who uses a Carro Armato P 40 heavy tank. She wears a hybrid uniform combining Black Shirts' (high boots, black shirt), similar to that of Benito Mussolini, the grigio-verde (grey and green), used by Italian troops during the Great War, and Arditi's (knife and necktie).
Anchovy's personality differs widely between the manga and anime (OVA). In the manga, she is a self-confident, hot-blooded, sometimes even cruel leader, seeing every Sensha-dō battle as personal duel between the leaders. Due to this attitude she even tends to insult enemies before the match, calling them weak and cowardly, and outright accusing Miho of throwing away victory during the last tournament.
In the anime she instead resembles all the classical stereotypes about the Italians: she is joyful, cheerful, a bit too self-confident, and out of the battle she acts friendly and respectfully with the opponents. She takes Sensha-dō as an opportunity to show that her team's abilities extend beyond their fighting spirit and determination; for this, she is greatly respected and admired by her subordinates, with whom she has an equal relationship, even to the point of their calling her Onēsan (お姉さん). She is shown to be quite caring towards her teammates as well as a capable tactician, and believes leaders have a responsibility to win the match for their team. Her real name is Chiyomi Anzai (安斎 千代美, Anzai Chiyomi).
Carpaccio (カルパッチョ, Karupatcho)
Voiced by: Saori Hayami (Japanese); Christina Stroup (English)
One of Anzio's vice-commanders, whose real name is Hina. She is a calm and collected individual and an honorable opponent, always wishing for a good and fair match. She is the commander of the M13 Flag Tank in manga, and the loader-radio operator of a Semovente 75/18 in the OVA. She is childhood friends with Caesar.
Pepperoni (ペパロニ, Peparoni)
Voiced by: Yō Taichi (Japanese); Christina Kelly (English)
The second of Anzio's vice-commanders. She drives an L3/33; while smart and extroverted, she can be a bit impulsive and often acts without thinking things through. She is also a great cook, as shown when she is running a booth serving Anzio's famous Napolitan dish.
Amaretto (アマレット, Amaretto)

== (Japan) Chi-Ha-Tan Academy ==
Chihatan Academy (知波単学園, Chihatan Gakuen) is a school from Chiba Prefecture which is based on the Imperial Japanese Army. Their tanks include Type 97 Chi-Ha, Type 97 ShinHoTo Chi-Ha, and the Type 2 Ka-Mi amphibious tank. Their school tradition's strategy is to charge into battle, often resulting in big losses. Their battle theme is Yuki no Shingun. Although not seen in the film, their school carrier is based on the Japanese aircraft carrier Akagi in her old triple flight deck configuration.

Kinuyo Nishi (西 絹代, Nishi Kinuyo)
Voiced by: Asami Seto (Japanese); Amelia Fischer, Alexis Lee (das Finale) (English)
The commander of Chihatan Academy's Sensha-dō team. A respectable leader who upholds honour and tradition. Sometimes has difficulty controlling the team's eagerness to charge towards the enemy. She rides a Type 97 Chi-Ha tank.
Haru Fukuda (福田 はる, Fukuda Haru)
Voiced by: Naomi Ōzora (Japanese); Terri Doty (English)
A bespectacled junior member commanding a Type 95 Ha-Go. Initially eager to follow her seniors' example by charging towards the enemy, she eventually bonds with the Duck Team and learns to emulate Oarai team's tactics.
Tamaki Tamada (玉田 環, Tamada Tamaki)
Voiced by: Madoka Yonezawa (Japanese); Chaney Moore (English)
She commands a Type 97 ShinHoTo Chi-Ha tank.
Shizuko Hosomi (細見 静子, Hosomi Shizuko)
Voiced by: Ami Nanase (Japanese); Annie Mai, Joanne Bonasso (das Finale) (English)
She commands a Type 97 Chi-Ha tank.
Emi Ikeda (池田 江美, Ikeda Emi)
Voiced by: Konomi Tada (Japanese); Kris Saltiel, Genevieve Simmons (das Finale) (English)
She commands a Type 97 Chi-Ha tank.
Noriyo Hamada (浜田 紀代, Hamada Noriyo)
Voiced by: Yuka Inoue (Japanese); Monica Rial (English)
She commands a Type 97 ShinHoTo Chi-Ha tank.

Tomiko Teramoto (寺本 とみ子, Teramoto Tomiko)
Voiced by: Ikumi Hayama (Japanese); Kalin Coates, Mai Le (das Finale) (English)
Hosomi's tank radio operator.
Setsuko Nagura (名倉 節子, Nagura Setsuko)
Voiced by: Miho Ishigami (Japanese); Carli Mosier (English)
She commands a Type 97 ShinHoTo Chi-Ha tank.
Rin Kubota (久保田 りん, Kubota Rin)
Voiced by: Yō Taichi (Japanese); Emily Neves (English)
She commands a Type 97 Chi-Ha tank.
Yasoko Nishihara (西原 八十子, Nishihara Yasoko)
Voiced by: Yuka Inoue
She commands a Type 2 Ka-Mi.
Tatsu Hasegawa (長谷川 タツ, Hasegawa Tatsu)
Voiced by: Mariya Ise
Fukuda's tank driver.
Hanako Hirai (平井 花子, Hirai Hanako)
Voiced by: Chika Anzai
Fukuda's tank gunner.
Chiyoko Uenishi (上西 千代子, Uenishi Chiyoko)
Voiced by: Satomi Moriya
She commands a Type 2 Ka-Mi.

== (Finland) Jatkosota (Keizoku) High school ==
Keizoku Highschool (継続高校, Keizoku Koukou) is a Finnish style school from Ishikawa Prefecture that appears in the films. The name "Keizoku" means "Continuation" in Japanese and is a reference to the Continuation War, the Finnish name for which is Jatkosota (hence the name of the school). Their names are all distinctly male Finnish common first names; their battle theme is the Säkkijärven polkka, and their one-tank team consists of a BT-42. For Das Finale Part 3 and Part 4 the team fields a number of T-26 tanks, a KV-1B, and StuG III "Sturmi".

Mika (ミカ, Mika)
Voiced by: Mamiko Noto (Japanese); Lauren Herink, Allison Sumrall (das Finale) (English)
The commander, tank commander and radio operator of the Keizoku team, Mika is a somewhat philosophical girl who is always carrying a kantele and wearing a Finnish sauna hat. Behind her serene facade, however, Mika is a mischievous person who does not hesitate to stealthily appropriate supplies and materials from her opponents.
Aki (アキ, Aki)
Voiced by: Shino Shimoji (Japanese); Melissa Molano (English)
The gunner and loader of Mika's team, and (like Orange Pekoe to Darjeeling) her constant sidekick.
Mikko (ミッコ, Mikko)
Voiced by: Miho Ishigami (Japanese); Jenny Strader (English)
The driver of Mika's team with a set of outrageous driving skills.
Jouko (ヨウコ, Youko)
Voiced by: Shion Wakayama
Nicknamed "White Witch", in reference to Simo Häyhä.
Yuri (ユリ, Yuri)
Voiced by: Konomi Tada
The commander of a KV-1. Her pompadour styled hair and accordion skills are a reference to the rock band the Leningrad Cowboys.

== (France) BC Freedom Academy ==
BC Freedom Academy (BC自由学園, BC Jiyū Gakuen) is a French style high school from Okayama Prefecture. The student body is divided into two parties, the enlisted students ("Escalators") and the transfer students ("Examinators"), which are quarreling with each other. In the series, the academy sports several themes from the French Revolution and Napoleonic eras, including the contemporary military march Chanson de l'Oignon ("Song of the Onion") as their Sensha-dō battle theme.

=== Anime ===
Their tanks include ARL 44, SOMUA S35 and Renault FT.

Marie (マリー, Mary)
Voiced by: Yumi Hara (Japanese); Cat Thomas (English)
The commander of BC Freedom Academy's Sensha-dō team who rides a Renault FT17 and enjoys eating cake at all times, as a nod to the French queen Marie Antoinette. She is an extremely cunning tactician; before her Shenshado match against Ooarai she manages to quell the infighting between the Escalators and Examinators, which almost proves fatal to the Ooarai team.
Ando (安藤, Andō)
Voiced by: Minami Tsuda (Japanese); Alexis Tipton (English)
The leader of the BC Examination Sensha-dō members who commands a SOMUA S35 tank.
Oshida (押田, Oshida)
Voiced by: Chika Anzai (Japanese); Avery Smithhart (English)
The leader of the BC Escalator Shenshado members, and commander of an ARL 44 tank.

=== Manga ===
Asparagus (アスパラガス, Asuparagasu)
Moule (ムール, Mūru)
Bordeaux (ボルドー, Borudō)

== (Poland) Bonple High School ==
Bonple High School (ボンプル学園, Bonpuru gakuen) is a Polish style high school based in Fukui Prefecture. The academy sports themes are mostly based from Polish national folk songs and inspired from the Home Army and the Solidarity movement, where the name of the school derived from. The school's emblem resembles Wojtek, a bear who served in the Polish Armed Forces in the West during WWII, and their Sensha-dō team fields the FT-17, TKS and the 7TP.

=== Anime ===
Maiko (マイコ, Maiko)
Voiced by: Ayuru Ōhashi
The overall commander of Bonple High School.

=== Manga ===
Jajka (ヤイカ, Yaika)
Uszka (ウシュカ, Ushuka)
Pierogi

== (Spain) Blue Division High School ==
Blue Division High School (青師団高校, Aoshidan Kōkō) is a Spanish style high school based in Wakayama Prefecture. Their school name comes from the Blue Division, a unit of Spanish volunteers that served on the Eastern Front of World War II. The school is famous for its culinary arts and does not have an official Senshado club. Their schoolgirl uniforms are based on those of the real-life Spanish Legion, which are known for their deep cleavage. The team used to have only light tanks such as the Verdeja 1, Panzer I, Panzer II and Carro Veloce CV.35, complemented by comparatively heavier light tanks such as BT-5 and T-26 until acquiring heavier models such as the Panzer IV Ausf.H, various Panzer III models and several StuG III.

El (エル, Eru)
Voiced by: Sakura Nakamura
The overall commander of Blue Division High School whose tank is a Panzer II Ausf.F.
Viridiana (ヴィリディアナ)
Voiced by: Ikumi Hayama
The driver of El's tank.
Tristana (トリスターナ, Torisutāna)
The radio operator of El's tank.
Andalucia (アンダルシア, Andarushia)
Voiced by: Mami Ozaki
She commands a Panzer II Ausf. F.

== (Australia) Koala Forest High School ==
Koala Forest High School (コアラの森学園) is an Australian style high school based in Tottori Prefecture. The school is famous for its barbecue parties and is friendly towards other schools, specially with Saunders and St. Gloriana. They have a koala in their main tank whom they appointed as their overall commander. Their tanks include the Matilda II, the M3 Light and Medium Tanks, and various other vehicles such as the Australian AC.I Sentinel and the very rare AC.III Thunderbolt.

Wallaby (蕨, Warabi)
Voiced by: Ayumi Fujimura
The vice-commander of Koala Forest High School and the de facto commander who claims to only follow koala's orders.
Platypus (鴨乃橋, Kamonohashi)
Voiced by: Asami Seto
The gunner of koala and Wallaby's tank.

== (France) Maginot Girls Academy ==
Maginot Girls Academy (マジノ女学院, Mazino Jogakuin) is a French-style academy from Yamanashi Prefecture which uses the SOMUA S35, Renault R35, Char B1 bis and Renault FT. The school ship of Maginot Girls Academy is based on the French submarine Surcouf.

Éclair (エクレール, Ekureru)
Voiced by: Nao Tōyama
Commander

== (United Nations) All-Stars University Team ==
All-Stars University Team (大学選抜チーム, Daigaku Senbatsu Chīmu) is a selection of college students that confronts Ōarai in the film. Their insignia is inspired by the Flag of the United Nations. Like Ōarai, they use tanks from multiple countries, including American, British, and German models. These include M26 Pershing, Centurion, M24 Chaffee, a T28 super-heavy tank, and a Karl-Gerät self-propelled siege mortar. They are also shown in the film to have several white M4 Sherman, though they were not used in the match. Their battle theme is When Johnny Comes Marching Home.

Alice Shimada (島田 愛里寿, Shimada Arisu)
Voiced by: Ayana Taketatsu (Japanese); Shenae'a Moore (English)
All-Stars University Team's overall commander, and the heir to the Shimada Sensha-dō school. A highly intelligent prodigy, she skipped several years of school and is now attending university despite her still-tender age. Like Miho, she is an avid fan and collector of the Boko franchise (see below). During her match against Ōarai, she rides a Centurion. After the match, Alice decides to leave the university and attend classes in a high school so that she can enjoy her youth. Considering to enroll in Ōarai at first, she decides to look for another school so that she can face Miho in battle again. She ends up transferring to St. Gloriana, where she fulfills her objective by taking her team to the finals against Ōarai in the Winter Continuous Track Cup.
Megumi (メグミ, Megumi)
Voiced by: Ayumi Fujimura (Japanese); Carolyn Medrano (English)
Megumi is one of Alice's three lieutenants and part of the Bermuda Trio. Before attending University she was a member of Saunders Girls High School. She commands an M26 Pershing, identifiable by a red square on the mudflap.
Azumi (アズミ, Azumi)
Voiced by: Yuko Iida (Japanese); Melissa Pritchett (English)
Azumi is one of Alice's three lieutenants and part of the Bermuda Trio. Before attending University she was a member of BC Freedom High School. She commands an M26 Pershing, identifiable by a yellow diamond on the mudflap.
Rumi (ルミ, Rumi)
Voiced by: Mai Nakahara (Japanese); Autumn Woods (English)
Rumi is one of Alice's three lieutenants and part of the Bermuda Trio. Before attending University she was a member of Jatkosota High School. She commands an M26 Pershing, identifiable by a blue triangle on the mudflap.

== (Japan) Japanese Sensha-dō Federation ==
Shichiro Kodama (児玉 七郎, Kodama Shichiro)
Voiced by: Nobuo Tobita
Chief director

=== North Kanto branch ===
Kanon Sasagawa (篠川 香音, Sasagawa Kanon)
Voiced by: Yuri Yamaoka (Japanese); Jenny Strader (English)
The head umpire
Remi Takashima (高島 レミ, Takashima Remi)
Voiced by: Chuna
Sub-umpire
Hibiki Inatomi (稲富 ひびき, Inatomi Hibiki)
Sub-umpire

== Others ==
Ami Chōno (蝶野 亜美, Chōno Ami)
Voiced by: Hekiru Shiina (Japanese); Shelley Calene-Black (English)
Ōarai's new Sensha-dō instructor who studied under Miho's mother. Holds the rank of captain within the JGSDF. On her first day as instructor, she arrived at Ōarai by airdropping in her tank via Low Altitude Parachute Extraction System from a Kawasaki C-2 and sending the inexperienced teams into an all-out practice battle immediately. She is often either on her Type 10 main battle tank or on a watchtower observing the Ōarai team's battles.
Yuri Isuzu (五十鈴 百合, Isuzu Yuri)
Voiced by: Masayo Kurata (Japanese); Emily Neves (English)
Hana's mother who comes from a family that traditionally practices flower arrangement. Akin to a traditional Japanese woman, she has a strong dislike for tanks and disapproves of Hana doing Sensha-dō, telling her daughter to never see her again after Hana refused to quit. However, they reconcile when she recognizes her daughter's passion for Sensha-dō and its positive effect on her flower arranging.
Shinzaburou (新三郎)
Voiced by: Atsushi Imaruoka (Japanese); David Matranga (English)
Rickshaw puller and manservant for the Isuzu family, who adores and encourages Hana.
Jungorou Akiyama (秋山 淳五郎, Akiyama Jungorou)
Voiced by: Yoshihisa Kawahara (Japanese); Christopher Ayres (English)
Yukari's father. He is a local barber who tends to be a little over-excitable about his daughter's welfare.
Yoshiko Akiyama (秋山 好子, Akiyama Yoshiko)
Voiced by: Eri Sendai (Japanese); Maggie Flecknoe (English)
Yukari's mother. She helps her husband at the barber shop, and tries her best to temper his emotional outbursts.
Shiho Nishizumi (西住 しほ, Nishizumi Shiho)
Voiced by: Yumi Tōma (Japanese); Genevieve Simmons (TV), Chelsea McCurdy (der Film) (English)
Miho and Maho's mother. Comes from a family with a long history in Sensha-dō and firmly believes in upholding the strict family tradition of Sensha-dō. She was Ami Chōno's instructor.
Hisako Reizei (冷泉 久子, Reizei Hisako)
Voiced by: Rikako Aikawa (Japanese); Luci Christian (English)
Mako's grandmother. She is Mako's only remaining family after her parents died, and although the two often bicker, they are very close. After the battle between Ōarai and Saunders in the national Sensha-dō championship, Mako learns that she has been taken to hospital and hurries back to Ōarai to be with her.
Chiyo Shimada (島田 千代, Shimada Chiyo)
Voiced by: Satsuki Yukino (Japanese); Joanne Bonasso (English)
Alice Shimada's mother. Head of the Shimada style of Sensha-dō. She is a rival to Nishizumi style's head, Shiho Nishizumi.
Emi Nakasuga (中須賀 エミ, Nakasuga Emi)
Miho's classmate during elementary school in the prequel manga, Girls und Panzer: Little Army. A half-German, half-Japanese girl in twin-tails who has a cold demeanour and hates dishonesty. She strongly dislikes Maho because of her order to fire at her sister's tank during a tournament when she was attempting to rescue one of Maho's teammates. She is the driver of the group's tank.
Hitomi Yuzumoto (柚本 瞳, Yuzumoto Hitomi)
Miho's classmate in elementary school, who's a bit clumsy and tends to transition from one hobby to another very quickly, causing her friends to wonder if Sensha-dō is merely a phase. She is the loader of the group's tank.
Chihiro Yusa (遊佐 千紘, Yusa Chihiro)
Miho's classmate in elementary school and Hitomi's childhood friend, who is talented at sports. She indicates that her mother, like Miho's, is very strict and impossible to oppose. She is the gunner of the group's tank.
Boko (ボコ, Boko)
Boko is the name of a fictional teddy bear franchise in Girls und Panzer. Appearing in various cameos in the TV series, it receives a more detailed introduction in the 2015 movie. Boko performs the part of a much-abused yet ever-optimistic victim of vicious beatings; hence he always sports some form of lesions and bandaging in his various depictions. Because of his long-suffering but enduring nature, he has become an idol and coveted collector's item for both Miho and Alice.
