= Girls und Panzer der Film =

2015 Japanese animated film by Tsutomu Mizushima

- Theatrical release poster
- Kanji: ガールズ&パンツァー 劇場版
- Revised Hepburn: Gāruzu ando Pantsā Gekijōban
- Directed by: Tsutomu Mizushima
- Screenplay by: Reiko Yoshida
- Produced by: Kiyoshi Sugiyama; Kiyoko Matsumura; Tomomi Kyōtani; Kazuyoshi Nishikawa; Youhei Hayashi; Shinichi Sugawara
- Starring: Mai Fuchigami; Ai Kayano; Mami Ozaki; Ikumi Nakagami; Yuka Iguchi
- Cinematography: Yoshihiro Sekiya; Hyo Gyu Park
- Edited by: Masato Yoshitake
- Music by: Shirō Hamaguchi
- Production company: Actas
- Distributed by: Showgate
- Release dates: November 20, 2015 (Tokyo); November 21, 2015 (Japan)
- Running time: 120 minutes
- Country: Japan
- Language: Japanese
- Box office: US$22.6 million

Girls und Panzer der Film (Note: Japanese: ガールズ&パンツァー 劇場版, Hepburn: Gāruzu ando Pantsā Gekijōban; lit. 'Girls und Panzer: The Movie') is a 2015 Japanese animated film and a sequel to the 2012 anime series Girls und Panzer. Produced by Actas and distributed by Showgate, the film is directed by Tsutomu Mizushima from a script written by Reiko Yoshida and features an ensemble cast that includes Mai Fuchigami, Ai Kayano, Mami Ozaki, Ikumi Nakagami, and Yuka Iguchi. The film follows the students of Ōarai Girls' Academy learning about the closure of their school after their recent victory against Kuromorimine Girls' High School was denounced.

A Japanese newspaper first reported that a sequel to the anime television series was "being tentatively planned" in December 2012, but it was later denied by staff. A sequel was announced as a film in 2013, with Mizushima returning to direct it in April. The film was set to premiere in 2014 but got delayed the following year instead. New cast members to join the returning cast of Girls und Panzer were announced in June and October 2015.

Girls und Panzer der Film premiered in Tokyo on November 20, 2015, and was released in Japan on November 21. The film grossed over $22 million worldwide and received positive reviews from critics for its action and character interaction. The film received awards and nominations, including the awards at Japanese Movie Critics Awards and Seiun Awards. Its sequel, Girls und Panzer das Finale, began to release one of its six films in the series in Japan on December 9, 2017.

== Plot ==
In a friendly exhibition match, Ōarai Girls' Academy join forces with a reckless Chihatan Gakuen against the combined forces of St. Gloriana Girls' College and Pravda Girls' High School. The match ends in favor of St. Gloriana and Pravda, and the participating students spend time in a bath afterward. Upon their return to the school, Ōarai students are informed by student council president Anzu Kadotani about the school's closure after the Ministry of Education, Culture, Sports, Science and Technology denounced their verbal agreement of keeping it open despite their win against Kuromorimine Girls' High School. (Note: As depicted in the final episode of Girls und Panzer (2012).) A plane from Saunders University High School arrives to retrieve Ōarai's tanks for safekeeping as the students prepare to vacate the aircraft carrier that houses the school.

Anzu visits the Japan Senshadō Federation along with Ōarai's instructor Ami Chōno to protest the closure. With the help of Miho and Maho's mother Shiho Nishizumi, who wants a rematch for Kuromorimine, they convince the Ministry to sign an agreement to reopen Ōarai's school once they win the annihilation match against Hand-picked University Team commanded by Alice Shimada. On the day of the match, Kuromorimine, Saunders, Pravda, St. Gloriana, Anzio Girls' High School, Keizoku High School, and Chihatan join Ōarai to increase their numbers against the opponent's thirty tanks.

Kuromorimine and Pravda capture a hill to provide support to their allies atop but are bombarded by Karl-Gerät's shells. Ōarai's Turtle and Duck teams, Anzio, and Keizoku join forces to destroy Karl. The remaining tanks of Ōarai and its allies arrive at an abandoned amusement park and use its attractions to eliminate the majority of Hand-picked University tanks, turning the tide in their favor. However, Alice eventually joins the fight and disables most of her opponent's tanks. With a total of three tanks remaining in the match, the Nishizumi sisters work together to confront Alice in a heated battle that ends with Ōarai's victory. Following the match, all the girls are traveling back to their respective schools, with Ōarai students sailing back to their aircraft carrier.

== Voice cast ==
Character	Japanese	English
Miho Nishizumi	Mai Fuchigami	Margaret McDonald
Saori Takebe	Ai Kayano	Jessica Calvello
Hana Isuzu	Mami Ozaki	Caitlynn French
Yukari Akiyama	Ikumi Nakagami	Rebekah Stevens
Mako Reizei	Yuka Iguchi	Molly Searcy
Anzu Kadotani	Misato Fukuen	Rozie Curtis
Yuzu Koyama	Mikako Takahashi	Maeghan Avocato
Momo Kawashima	Kana Ueda	Patricia Duran
Noriko Isobe	Mika Kikuchi	Chelsea McCurdy
Taeko Kondō	Maya Yoshioka	Kalin Coates
Shinobu Kawanishi	Mari Kirimura	Cynthia Martinez
Akebi Sasaki	Sakura Nakamura	Carli Mosier
Takako Suzuki / Caesar	Eri Sendai	Shannon Emerick
Riko Matsumoto / Erwin	Satomi Moriya	Luci Christian
Kiyomi Sugiyama / Saemonza	Yuka Inoue	Tiffany Terrell
Takeko Nogami / Oryō	Ayuru Ōhashi	Nancy Novotny
Azusa Sawa	Hitomi Takeuchi	Allison Sumrall
Ayumi Yamagō	Nozomi Nakazato	Katelyn Barr
Karina Sakaguchi	Konomi Tada	Monica Rial
Yūki Utsugi	Yuri Yamaoka	Maggie Flecknoe
Aya Ōno	Chuna	Juliet Simmons
Saki Maruyama	Mikako Komatsu	Kara Greenberg
Midoriko Sono	Shiori Izawa	Tiffany Grant
Moyoko Gotō	Shiori Izawa	Shelley Calene-Black
Nozomi Konparu	Shiori Izawa	Emily Neves
Reira Nakajima	Nozomi Yamamoto	Tiffany Grant
Maria Suzuki	Mai Ishihara	Brittney Karbowski
Keiko Hoshino	Hisako Kanemoto	Diane Gallagher
Muuton Tsuchiya	Eri Kitamura	Luci Christian
Mai Nekota / Nekonyā	Ikumi Hayama	Monica Rial
Taki Momose / Momogā	Masayo Kurata	Karlii Hoch
Aoi Hiyoshi / Piyotan	Sumire Uesaka	Maggie Flecknoe
Darjeeling	Eri Kitamura	Kara Greenberg
Orange Pekoe	Mai Ishihara	Ally Piotrowski
Assam	Satomi Akesaka	Joanne Bonasso
Rosehip	Natsumi Takamori	Stephanie Wittels Wachs
Rukuriri	Masayo Kurata	Lauren Hernik
Kay	Ayako Kawasumi	Emily Neves
Naomi	Mariya Ise	Stephanie Wittels Wachs
Alisa	Aya Hirano	Brittney Karbowski
Anchovy	Maya Yoshioka	Kira Vincent-Davis
Carpaccio	Saori Hayami	Christina Stroup
Pepperoni	Yō Taichi	Christina Kelly
Katyusha	Hisako Kanemoto	Hilary Haag
Nonna	Sumire Uesaka	Shannon Emerick
Klara	Jenya	Olga Jankowski
Nina	Saki Ogasawara	Karlii Hoch
Alina	Kanami Satō	Monica Rial
Maho Nishizumi	Rie Tanaka	Kim Prause
Erika Itsumi	Hitomi Nabatame	Elizabeth Bannor
Mika	Mamiko Noto	Lauren Herink
Aki	Shino Shimoji	Melissa Molano
Mikko	Miho Ishigami	Jenni Strader
Kinuyo Nishi	Asami Seto	Amelia Fischer
Haru Fukuda	Naomi Ōzora	Terri Doty
Tamaki Tamada	Madoka Yonezawa	Chaney Moore
Shizuko Hosomi	Ami Nanase	Annie Mai
Emi Ikeda	Konomi Tada	Kris Saltiel
Noriyo Hamada	Yuka Inoue	
Tomiko Teramoto	Ikumi Hayama	Kalin Coates
Setsuko Nagura	Miho Ishigami	
Rin Kubota	Yō Taichi	
Alice Shimada	Ayana Taketatsu	Shanae'a Moore
Megumi	Ayumi Fujimura	Carolyn Medrano
Azumi	Yuko Iida	Melissa Pritchett
Rumi	Mai Nakahara	Autumn Woods
Shichiro Kodama (Note: Credited as "Chairman" (理事長).)	Nobuo Tobita	Christopher Ayres
Shiho Nishizumi	Yumi Tōma	Chelsea McCurdy
Yuri Isuzu	Masayo Kurata	Emily Neves
Chiyo Shimada	Satsuki Yukino	Joanne Bonasso
Ami Chōno	Hekiru Shiina	Shelley Calene-Black
Jungorou Akiyama	Yoshihisa Kawahara	Christopher Ayres
Yoshiko Akiyama	Eri Sendai	Maggie Flecknoe
Shinzaburou	Atsushi Imaruoka	David Matranga
Renta Tsuji (Note: Credited as "Government official" (役人).)	Daisuke Kageura	John Swasey
Kanon Sasagawa	Yuri Yamaoka	Jenni Strader
Remi Takashima	Chuna	
Boco	Ayumi Fujimura	Joanne Bonasso

== Production ==
=== Development ===
Jōyō Shimbun, a Japanese newspaper based in Ibaraki Prefecture, reported a sequel to Girls und Panzer (2012) was "being tentatively planned" in December 2012, citing the franchise's popularity. Following the report, publicity representative Yūji Hirooka at Bandai Visual revealed that there were no plans for a sequel but stated that the "possibility is not zero". At the Heartful Tank Carnival event in April 2013, Tsutomu Mizushima was announced to be returning to direct a film for the franchise after the project was greenlit. In the same month, producer Kiyoshi Sugiyama confirmed that the film would serve as a sequel to the anime television series. Mizushima announced the film's runtime was 120 minutes instead of the planned 90 minutes in March 2015.

=== Pre-production ===
In June 2015, Asami Seto joined the cast of the film as Chihatan Gakuen commander Kinuyo Nishi. Additional cast were announced in October 2015, including Ayana Taketatsu as Alice Shimada, Ayumi Fujimura as Megumi, Yuko Iida as Azumi, Mai Nakahara as Rumi, Madoka Yonezawa as Tamaki Tamada, Naomi Ōzora as Haru Fukuda, Natsumi Takamori as Rosehip, Jenya as Klara, Mamiko Noto as Mika, Shino Shimoji as Aki, and Miho Ishigami as Mikko. Ami Nanase joined the cast of the film as Shizuko Hosomi in November 2015.

=== Animation ===
Belarusian video game company Wargaming was deeply involved in the production of the film. The company provided illustrations of nine tanks that were featured in the film: BT-42, Centurion Mk 1, Churchill I–VII, Crusader, Karl-Gerät, T28, M26 Pershing, VK 4501 (P), and T95. Producer Sugiyama received black-and-white illustrations rather than photographs since they would be more useful in providing details for tanks during animation.

=== Post-production ===
Sentai Filmworks announced the English dub cast for the film in November 2016. In an interview with the Embassy of Finland in Tokyo in July 2017, Mizushima explained the names Mika, Aki, and Mikko were associated with Finnish male names that can be sounded Japanese, revealing his familiarity with them from watching Estonian Autosport Union president Ari Vatanen's career in motorsports. He also revealed the Keizoku High School in the film was based on Finland's Continuation War during World War II.

== Music ==
ChouCho was announced to be performing the ending theme music of Girls Und Panzer der Film titled "Piece of Youth" in March 2015, after previously doing so for Girls und Panzer (2012). Bandai Namco Arts released the film's original soundtrack composed by Shirō Hamaguchi under their Lantis label in Japan on November 18, 2015. Japanese kantele player Hiroko Ara played the Finnish folk tune included in the soundtrack titled "Säkkijärven polkka".

=== Track listing ===
All music is composed by Hamaguchi, except where indicated. Track 17 ("It's the Academy's Ten Colors!") is a medley of different songs by different composers: "Panzerlied" by Kurt Wiehle, "Battle Hymn of the Republic" by William Steffe, "Katyusha" by Matvey Blanter, "The British Grenadiers", "Funiculì, Funiculà" by Luigi Denza, "Säkkijärven polkka", "Marching in the Snow" by Nagai Kenshi, and "Panzerfahren March! Panzer Vor!" by Hamaguchi.

Disc 1
No.	Title	Music	Length
1.	"Movie Version: Panzerfahren March! Panzer Vor!"		3:16
2.	"It's Enter Enter Mission!"	Kana Yabuki; Hiroshi Sasaki	1:36
3.	"Movie Version: Advance Ōarai Girls' Academy Team!"		2:34
4.	"The Ōarai/Chihatan Alliance Aims for Victory!"		2:35
5.	"Chihatan Academy, All Tanks Advance!"		1:34
6.	"Lonely Panzerfahren!"		1:40
7.	"It's the Shimada Style!"		1:39
8.	"It's Evening!"		3:32
9.	"I'm a Little Tired!"		2:30
10.	"Everyone Feels the Same Way!"		2:48
11.	"Somehow, It's Like This Every Day!"		0:59
12.	"Don't Forget to Prepare!"		1:22
13.	"It's the Nishizumi Style!"		1:23
14.	"We Love the Panzer II!"		1:03
15.	"The Chairman Also Works Once in a While!"		2:10
16.	"The Light of Hope Hasn't Disappeared Entirely Yet!"		3:40
17.	"It's the Academy's Ten Colors!"		2:39
18.	"Angler Fish, It's Operation Dried Potato-Clam!"		2:07
19.	"Yukari-san Says It Looks Like the Western Front!"		3:30
20.	"Geronimo!"		0:43
21.	"Ambushed!"		1:06
22.	"Chihatan, It's a New Battle!"		1:05
23.	"A Worthy Opponent!"		2:06
24.	"A Long-range Cannon!"		1:16
25.	"Caught in Between!"		2:06
26.	"It's Without Equal!"		2:32
27.	"It's Decided!"		3:34
28.	"Movie Version: A Tense Situation!"		2:33
29.	"Relaxing During the Calm!"		3:15
30.	"Wojtek!"		2:33
31.	"Movie Version: Maidens' Art, Panzerfahren March!"		2:28
Total length:			67:54

Disc 2
No.	Title	Lyrics	Music	Length
1.	"My Book!" (performed by Ayumi Fujimura)	Reiko Yoshida	Tsutomu Mizushima	3:03
2.	"Säkkijärven polkka"		Unknown	3:20
3.	"Marching in the Snow"		Nagai Kenshi	2:22
4.	"U.S. Field Artillery March"		John Philip Sousa	1:55
5.	"Home! Sweet Home!"		Henry Bishop	3:03
6.	"When Johnny Comes Marching Home"		Patrick Gilmore	3:01
7.	"Panzerlied"		Kurt Wiehle	2:38
Total length:				19:22

== Marketing ==
A teaser trailer for Girls und Panzer der Film was released in July 2014, followed by its first visual in November. In March 2015, a promotional video from Bandai Visual summarizing the franchise's story and the second visual for the film were released. The second teaser trailer for the film was released in June 2015. In October 2015, the third visual and a full trailer and new commercial video for the film were released. A novel written by screenwriter Reiko Yoshida and illustrated by Fumikane Shimada and Isao Sugimoto was released on October 10, 2015, which would fill in the gap between the anime television series and the film.

Promotional partners for the film included Kirin Company, through their "Fire" canned coffee brand; Circle K Sunkus, through the use of a Rakuten point card; Ōarai Marine Tower; karaoke chains Manekineko and Dam; World of Tanks; Bakudan-yaki Honpo restaurant; Namco, which set up character pop stores in Japan; and Book-Ace bookstore.

== Release ==
=== Theatrical ===
Girls und Panzer der Film held its world premiere at the Shinjuku Wald 9 theater in Tokyo on November 20, 2015, and was released in Japan on November 21. The film was released in 27 4DX theaters on February 20, 2016. Cinema Sunshine Heiwajima held an "extreme" 4DX screening of the film, which involved more aggressive chair movements, on March 5, 2016, after gaining positive feedback with their screening of Mad Max: Fury Road (2015). Additional three 4DX screenings of the film were held on March 20, 2016. Girls und Panzer der Film was previously scheduled to be released in 2014, before it was shifted between June and August 2015, and then to the November premiere. As part of the 10th anniversary of the release of Girls und Panzer, the film was screened in 127 theaters on October 9, 2022.

The film was released at the Scotland Loves Anime film festival in the United Kingdom on October 23, 2016, in the United States on November 18, with its American premiere taking place at New People Cinema in San Francisco, and in Canada on January 26, 2017.

=== Home media ===
Girls und Panzer der Film was released on Blu-ray and DVD in Japan on May 27, 2016. They include a new original video animation and an episode of Yukari Akiyama's Tank Course. Four days later, Oricon reported the film's limited special edition Blu-ray had sold 162,361 copies in its first week since its release, ranking first in their May 23–29 Blu-ray disc chart. It became the fourth overall highest-selling Japanese animation Blu-ray disc during a first-week sale, placing behind the 2015 anime film Love Live! The School Idol Movie (194,000 copies). As part of the 10th-anniversary celebration, the film was aired on Animax on October 16, 2022, and on January 1, 2023.

Girls und Panzer der Film was released on Blu-ray and DVD combo set in the United States and Canada by Sentai Filmworks on May 16, 2017, and began streaming on Hidive on August 24. MVM Entertainment released the film on Blu-ray and DVD in the United Kingdom and Ireland on November 20, 2017. Netflix streamed the film from October 15, 2019, to November 22, 2021. Sentai Filmworks released the film on Blu-ray on October 11, 2022.

== Reception ==
=== Box office ===
Girls und Panzer der Film grossed $22,305,934 in Japan and $306,745 in other territories, for a worldwide total of $22.6 million. The film is the thirteenth highest-grossing domestic film of 2015 in Japan.

Girls und Panzer der Film earned $1.05 million in its opening weekend, ranking second at the Japanese box office behind World of Delight (2015). The film remained second at the box office after earning $527,133 in its second weekend, but it dropped to seventh in its third weekend. The film grossed ¥500 million in 22 days since its release, topping the previous weekend's earnings by 27% with its fourth-weekend earnings, and ¥1 billion in 71 days. The film grossed over ¥2 billion in May 2016 and earned additional ¥4 million at the end of its one-year theatrical run. Certain theaters in Japan, such as Cinema City and Cinema Chupki Tabata, continued to screen the film, bringing its total box office to ¥2.5 billion.

=== Critical response ===
Nick Creamer of Anime News Network graded Girls und Panzer der Film "A−", feeling that the film "wraps up all of its actual plot into a concise twenty minute interlude, mixing that with some goofy comedy courtesy of Miho's friends and a little more character work for the original series' underserved squads". He praised Mizushima's direction, the film's second half that had "one of the most impressive and entertaining battle scenes you could imagine", how a huge ensemble of characters earned their moments, and the CG animation. Writing for Otaku USA, Paul Thomas Chapman felt that the film had "full of masterfully executed action set pieces and comedic beats". Ian Wolf of Anime UK News gave the film 8 out of 10, praising some of its comedic moments and the camerawork. Despite that, he found the film a "'plucky underdog' dog film [that] you can guess how most of the plot is going to turn out" and some of the 3D animation unfitting.

=== Accolades ===
Year	Award	Category	Nominee(s)	Result	Ref.
2016	Japanese Movie Critics Awards	Sanctuary Award	Girls und Panzer der Film	Won	
2016	Seiun Awards	Best Dramatic Presentation	Girls und Panzer der Film	Won	
2016	Newtype Anime Awards	Best Picture (Film)	Girls und Panzer der Film	Nominated	
2016	Newtype Anime Awards	Best Soundtrack	Girls und Panzer der Film	Nominated	
2018	Crunchyroll Anime Awards	Best Film	Girls und Panzer der Film	Nominated	

=== Impact ===
Two days after the premiere of Girls und Panzer der Film, the official Twitter account of the Girls und Panzer franchise reported the people had rowdily trespassed Ōarai Golf Club in Ibaraki Prefecture after its golf course was featured in the film. In April 2016, cosplaying tourists who visited Kamioka Elementary School in the same prefecture, where the members of Ōarai Girls' Academy's Senshadō club reside following their school's closure in the film, were banned from doing cosplay photo sessions after the local residents complained about their mismanagement in the facility. The film influenced young Japanese men to attend kantele lessons and Japanese tourists to visit Parola Tank Museum near Hämeenlinna in Finland to see the real-life BT-42. The Japanese donated approximately ¥3 million through the museum's cloud funding to help in building a roof for exposed tanks.

== Related books ==
=== Manga ===
==== Girls und Panzer der Film: Heartful Tank Anthology ====
Two volumes of a manga anthology based on Girls und Panzer der Film, titled Girls und Panzer der Film: Heartful Tank Anthology (ガールズ&パンツァー 劇場版 ハートフル・タンク・アンソロジー), were published in Japan by Kadokawa under their MF Comics Alive Series label from May 23, 2016, to March 23, 2017. Seiman Dōman, Maruko Nii, Ren Hibasaka, Ryohichi Saitaniya, Yu Tsunamino, Hekiru Hikawa, Hagi Midori, Chomoran, Tsuchii, Yu Yagami, Takashi Ino, Makoto Katayama, and Ikumi Nakagami (who voices Yukari Akiyama) each authored a manga compiled in the first volume of the anthology.

No.	Japanese release date	Japanese ISBN
01	May 23, 2016	978-4-0406-8285-3
02	March 23, 2017	978-4-0406-8562-5

==== Girls und Panzer der Film: Variante ====
A manga adaptation of Girls und Panzer der Film, titled Girls und Panzer der Film: Variante (ガールズ&パンツァー 劇場版 Variante), was illustrated by Takashi Ino and was serialized in Media Factory's Monthly Comic Flapper magazine from August 5, 2016, to August 5, 2022. The first tankōbon volume was released in Japan on January 23, 2017, and the eighth and final volume was released on October 21, 2022.

No.	Japanese release date	Japanese ISBN
01	January 23, 2017	978-4-0406-8825-1
02	August 23, 2017	978-4-0406-9377-4
03	March 23, 2018	978-4-0406-9695-9
04	January 23, 2019	978-4-0406-5203-0
05	November 21, 2019	978-4-0406-4071-6
06	October 23, 2020	978-4-0406-4769-2
07	October 21, 2021	978-4-0468-0722-9
08	October 21, 2022	978-4-0468-1797-6

=== Light novel ===
Girls und Panzer der Film was adapted into a light novel written by Takaaki Suzuki and illustrated by Saitaniya. Two volumes were released in Japan by Kadokawa under their MF Bunko J imprint on August 25, 2018.

No.	Title	Japanese release date	Japanese ISBN
01	Girls und Panzer der Film (Above) (ガールズ&パンツァー 劇場版（上）)	August 25, 2018	978-4-0406-5227-6
02	Girls und Panzer der Film (Below) (ガールズ&パンツァー 劇場版（下）)	August 25, 2018	978-4-0406-5228-3

== Sequel ==
=== Alice War! ===
Alice War! (アリス・ウォー！, Arisu Wō!) is the original video animation included in the release of the film's Blu-ray and DVD on May 27, 2016, which is set after the events of the film.

==== Plot ====
Alice considers transferring to Ōarai Girls' Academy to enjoy normal high school life. The school's tank teams attempt to think up ideas to make her feel welcome. Alice eventually realizes that if she joins Ōarai then she will not be able to compete against Miho again, so she decides to cancel her transfer.

=== Girls und Panzer das Finale ===
A sequel project to Girls und Panzer der Film was announced in August 2016. The project was revealed to be a six-part anime film series in November 2016. The first film in the series, Girls und Panzer das Finale: Part 1, was produced by Actas and directed by Mizushima from a script written by Yoshida. The film was released in Japan on December 9, 2017.
