= Yuki no Shingun =

Japanese military marching song

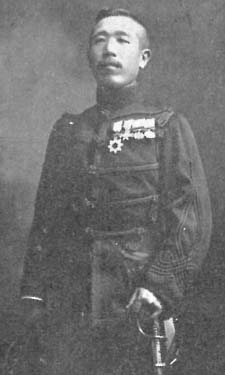
Nagai Kenshi

"Yuki no Shingun" (Japanese: 雪の進軍, lit. 'The Snow March') is a Japanese gunka composed in 1895 by Imperial Japanese Army musician Nagai Kenshi who reflected his experience in the Battle of Weihaiwei during the First Sino-Japanese War. The song was banned in the Imperial Japanese Army during World War II, and has since been used in many works of media including the 1977 film Mount Hakkoda.

== Background ==
During the Battle of Weihaiwei, the Imperial Japanese Army experienced heavy snow and low temperature, while being under-equipped with water, food and fuel. Nagai reflected this in his song about the hardship the Japanese soldiers experienced and their discontentment about the war. The song was titled "The Snow March." The song became popular following its publication, is described by scholars to have an upbeat melody. It was reported to be a favorite song of field marshall Ōyama Iwao. It was also taught and sung in Japanese schools during the late Meiji period.

Nagai's song was later widely referred to by soldiers during the Second Sino-Japanese War and the Pacific War. The discontentment about the war expressed in the song were viewed as antagonistic to Japanese militarism and prohibited by the Imperial Japanese Army, though the effectiveness of the order was in doubt.

== Lyrics ==
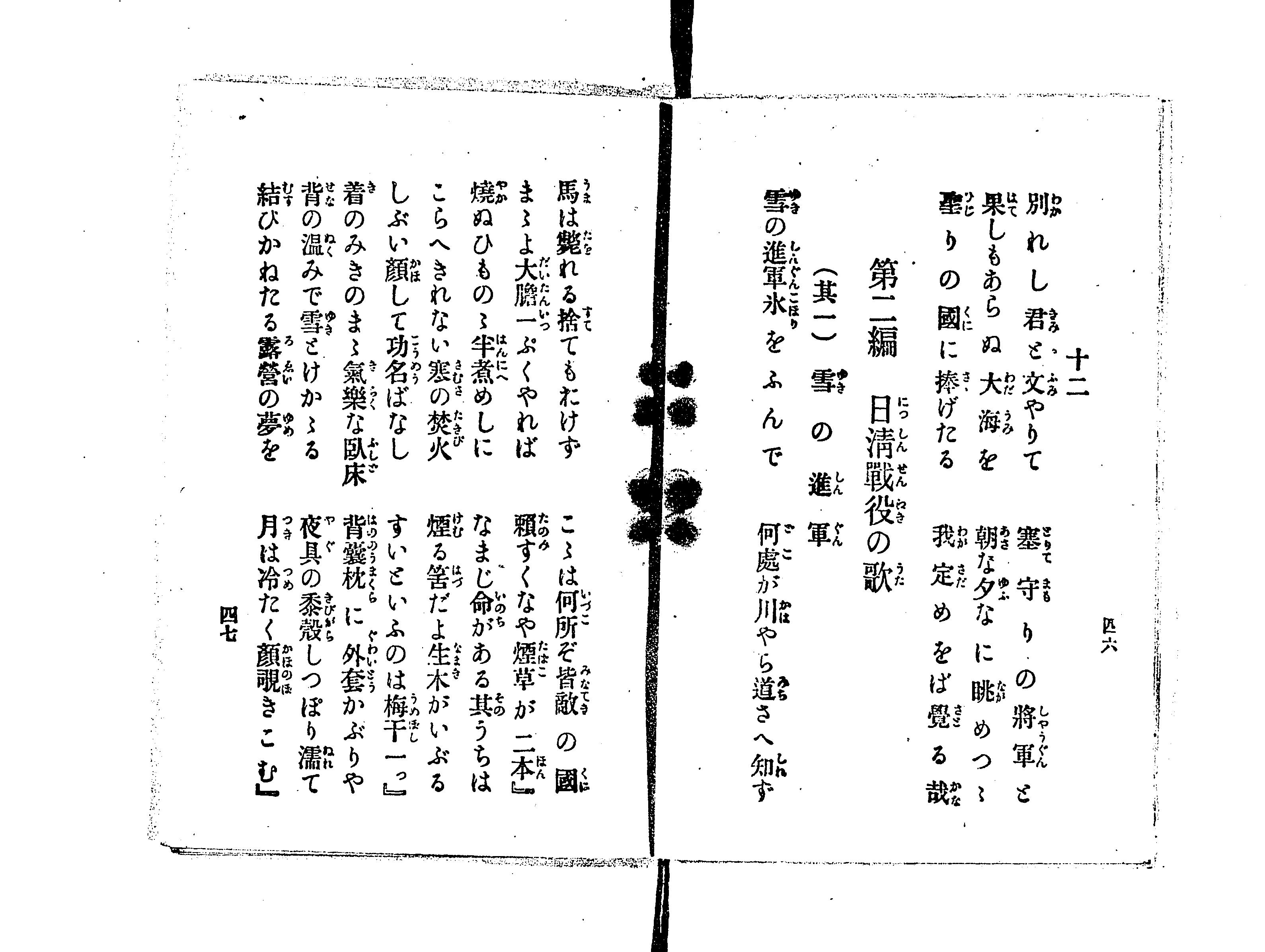
"Yuki no Shingun", published in Collections of Excellent Gunka (軍歌傑作集, Gunka kessaku-shū) (1911).

Yuki no Shingun
Columbia Regal 68643 (277278). Played by the Toyama Army School Military Band.

Kyūjitai	Shinjitai	Rōmaji	English Translation
雪の進軍 氷を踏んで 何處が河やら 道さへ知れず 馬は斃れる 捨てゝもおけず 此處は何處ぞ 皆敵の國 儘まよ大膽 一服やれば 頼み少なや 煙草が二本	雪(ゆき)の進軍(しんぐん)氷(こおり)を踏(ふ)んで どこが河(かわ)やら道(みち)さえしれず 馬(うま)は斃(たお)れる捨(す)ててもおけず ここは何処(いずく)ぞ皆(みな)敵(てき)の国(くに) ままよ大胆(だいたん)一服(いっぷく)やれば 頼(たの)み少(すく)なや煙草(タバコ)が二本(にほん)	Yuki no shingun koori wo funde Doko ga kawa yara michi sae shirezu Uma wa taoreru sutete mo okezu Koko wa izuku zo mina teki no kuni Mama yo daitan ippuku yareba Tanomi sukunaya tabako ga nihon	Marching in the snow, stepping on ice We can't even tell passages from rivers The horses are beaten, but we can't leave them Just what is this place? It's all enemy territory Tried to take a cigarette thinking 'Well the hell with it.' I'll be damned. Why there is another?
燒かぬ乾魚に 半煮え飯に 憖生命の ある其の内は 堪へ切れ無い 寒さの焚火 煙い筈だよ 生木が燻る 澁い顏して 功名噺 「粋」いと云ふのは 梅干し一つ	焼(や)かぬ乾魚(ひもの)に半(はん)煮(に)え飯(めし)に なまじ生命(いのち)のあるそのうちは こらえ切(き)れない寒(さむ)さの焚火(たきび) 煙(けむ)いはずだよ生木(なまき)が燻(いぶ)る 渋(しぶ)い顔(かお)して功名(こうみょう)噺(ばなし) 「酸(す)い」というのは梅干(うめぼし)一(ひと)つ	Yakanu himono ni han-nie meshi ni Namaji inochi no aru sono uchi wa Korae kirenai samusa no takibi Kemui hazu da yo namaki ga iburu Shibui kao shite kōmyō banashi "Sui" to iu no wa umeboshi hitotsu	Dried fishes are not dry enough, and the rice won't be cooked enough. It's not long before we're living half-boiled days For this cold can't be endured with just a bonfire It will definitely smoke but the wet wood burns. Putting on a sour face, saying the stories of valor. The "sour" thing here's a pickled plum
着の身着のまゝ 氣樂な臥所 背嚢枕に 外套被りや 背の溫みで雪融け掛る 夜具の黍殻 シッポリ濡れて 結び兼ねたる 露營の夢を 月は泠たく顏覗き込む	着(き)の身(み)着(き)のまま気楽(きらく)な臥所(ふしど) 背嚢(はいのう)枕(まくら)に外套(がいとう)被(かぶ)りゃ 背(せな)の温(ぬく)みで雪(ゆき)解(ど)けかかる 夜具(やぐ)の黍殻(きびがら)しっぽり濡(ぬ)れて 結(むす)びかねたる露営(ろえい)の夢(ゆめ)を 月(つき)は冷(つめ)たく顔(かお)覗(のぞ)き込(こ)む	Ki nomi ki no mama kiraku na fushido Hainō makura ni gaitō kaburya Sena no nukumi de yuki doke kakaru Yagu no kibigara shippori nurete Musubi kanetaru roei no yume wo Tsuki wa tsumetaku kao nozokikomu	The clothes we wear are our carefree beds We cover under our overcoats on knapsack pillows With the warmth of our backs, the snow thaws Soaking wet our millet-husk bedding We can't dream of dreaming in the bivouacs The moon peeks into, coldly
命捧げて 出てきた身故 死ぬる覺悟で 吶喊すれど 武運拙く 討死にせねば 義理に絡めた 恤兵眞緜 そろりそろりと 頚締め掛る どうせ生かして 還さぬ積り	命(いのち)捧(ささ)げて出(で)てきた身(み)ゆえ 死(し)ぬる覚悟(かくご)で吶喊(とっかん)すれど 武運(ぶうん)拙(つたなく)く討死(うちじ)にせねば 義理(ぎり)にからめた恤兵(じゅうっぺい)真綿(まわた) そろりそろりと頚(くび)締(し)めかかる どうせ生(い)かして還(かえ)さぬ積(つ)もり	Inochi sasagete detekita mi yue Shinuru kakugo de tokkan suredo Buun tsutanaku uchiji ni seneba Giri ni karameta jūppei mawata Sorori sorori to kubi shime kakaru Dōse ikashite kaesanu tsumori	As we came here in debt of our lives We charged with death resolution If the fortunes of war betrayed us, and we survived the battle The consolation packages entwined with loyalty Slowly, slowly, would try to strangle us Anyhow, the superiors won't let us go home alive

== In popular culture ==
- The 1977 film Mount Hakkoda used "Yuki no Shingun" and associated this song with the Hakkōda Mountains incident.
- The Japanese version of the 2005 video game Destroy All Humans!, released in 2007, referred to the first two lines of the song.
- The 2012 anime Girls und Panzer shows Yukari Akiyama and Riko "Erwin" Matsumoto singing the song during a reconnaissance march through the snow in episode 9, and the anime's sequel films Girls und Panzer der Film (2015) and Girls und Panzer das Finale (2017-present) use the melody as a leitmotif for the Imperial Japanese Army-themed Chi-Ha-Tan Academy.
