= Jenya =

Russian voice actress

- ジェーニャ
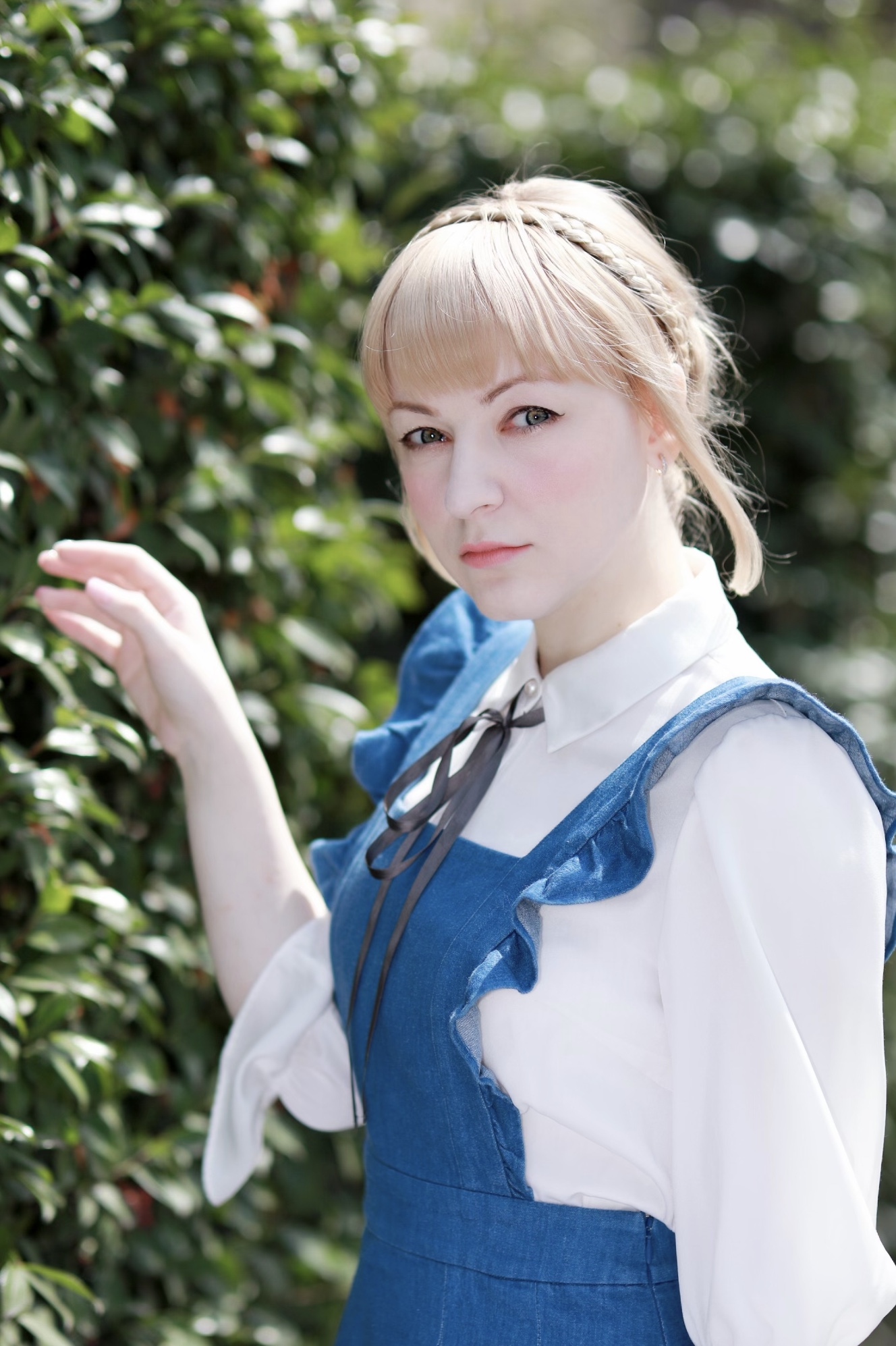
- Born: Yevgeniya Ivanovna Davidyuk; March 22, 1981 (age 45); Novosibirsk, Novosibirsk Oblast, Russian SFSR, Soviet Union
- Other name: Itsuki Akiba (秋葉いつき)
- Education: Novosibirsk State University of Economics and Management
- Occupations: Voice actress; singer; radio personality
- Years active: 2009–present
- Height: 161 cm (5 ft 3 in)
- Spouse: unknown (m. 2016)
- Children: 1
- Musical career
- Instrument: Vocals
- Years active: 2002–present

Yevgeniya Ivanovna Davidyuk (Russian: Евгения Ивановна Давидюк, born March 22, 1981), known professionally as Jenya (Japanese: ジェーニャ, Hepburn: Jēnya), is a Russian voice actress, singer, and radio personality based in Japan.

== Early life ==
Yevgeniya Davidyuk was born at Novosibirsk, Soviet Union on March 22, 1981, and spent most of her childhood at Gorky. Her father was a military officer who taught his subordinates the ideologies of the Communist Party. She has a younger brother. At the age of eight, her family moved to Czechoslovakia for a five-year stay due to her father's work, but they returned to the Soviet Union a year later and lived in Kaliningrad for almost two years before moving back to Novosibirsk. At the age of 16, she became interested in voice acting after watching the Japanese animated series Sailor Moon in 1997, which she described as the "anime that changed my life". She majored in information technology at Novosibirsk State University of Economics and Management in 1998. While studying, she frequently visited the Siberia-Hokkaido Cultural Center where she founded an anime club and learned Japanese. She moved to Japan in 2005, where she worked part-time in Akihabara.

== Career ==
Jenya created an anime fan website (kawaii.otaku.ru) in 2000, where she posted anime songs she performed in Japanese. She became known as "the Russian anime singer who sings in Japanese" in 2002 and was invited by the Japanese broadcast channel Mondo2 (now Mondo TV) to appear on a show. She arrived in Tokyo for the first time with her father for a week to be filmed. In 2007, she was hired as a Russian language coach for anime productions, including Black Lagoon. She made her voice acting debut as an operator at NERV's Bethany Base in the 2009 anime film Evangelion: 2.0 You Can (Not) Advance.

In 2013, Jenya was a finalist for CanCam's model audition. In 2014, she returned to Russia to host and sing in a Game Symphony Japan concert, where an orchestra performs music from games and anime, after an invitation from conductor Kenichi Shimura. She performed again with the orchestra in Tokyo in July 2016, in Russia in April 2018, and in Yokohama in November.

In 2015, she was announced as the voice of Klara, an original character specifically created by director Tsutomu Mizushima for her, in Girls und Panzer der Film. She met Mizushima after the production team found her tweet stating her lack of role in Girls und Panzer despite the appearance of Russian-based characters in the series.

Jenya is currently a freelancer. She previously worked under Media Force (September 2008–September 2010), 81 Produce (November 2010–May 2014), K Hive (March 2015–2018), Wave Master (July 2018–October 2020), and New Gate Tokyo (January 2021–July 2022).

== Personal life ==
Jenya passed the N1 Japanese-Language Proficiency Test and scored 935 points on the TOEIC. In 2016, Jenya announced on her blog that she had married and was pregnant. On March 20, 2017, she gave birth to a girl.

== Filmography ==
=== Television ===
Year	Title	Role	Network	Note
2007	TV Champion 2	Herself	TV Tokyo	Variety show; finalist in "King of Foreign Otaku" segment
2009	Cheburashka Arere?	Rariska	TV Tokyo	Voice in anime
2014	Mysterious Joker	Lady Doubt	Kids Station	Voice in anime; second season
2015	Fūfu Japan	Herself	Fuji TV	Regular
2015	Nandemo World Ranking Nepu & Imoto no Sekai Bantsuki	Herself	NTV	Variety show regular
2015	World Break: Aria of Curse for a Holy Swordsman	Elena Arshavina	TV Tokyo	Voice in anime (Russian dialect only)
2016	Yuri on Ice	Woman D	TV Asahi	Voice in anime; Russian language supervisor
2017	Russia-go Suki?	Herself	NHK E-TV	Regular
2017	Hina Logi: from Luck & Logic	Additional voices	Tokyo MX	Voice in anime; Russian language supervisor
2022	Akiba Maid War	Zoya	Tokyo MX, BS11, KBS Kyoto, SUN	Voice in anime
2026	Magical Girl Raising Project: Restart	Nonako Miyokata	TBA	Voice in anime

=== Anime films ===
List of voice performances in anime films
Year	Title	Role	Ref.
2009	Evangelion: 2.0 You Can (Not) Advance	NERV's Bethany Base operator	
2015	Girls und Panzer der Film	Klara	
2017	Girls und Panzer das Finale: Part 1	Klara	
2021	Girls und Panzer das Finale: Part 3	Klara	

=== Video games ===
Year	Title	Role	Notes
2010	Kud Wafter	TASA spokesperson	
2012	Time Travelers	Female friend of Mikoto, Yulia	
2015	Azure Striker Gunvolt 2	Desna	
2022	Girls' Frontline	AK74M	

=== Dubbing ===
- Transformers: Dark of the Moon, Russian lady (Inna Korobkina)
- X-Men: First Class, Teenage girl (Sasha Pieterse)
