= Mysterious Joker =

Japanese manga series by Hideyasu Takahashi

- Cover of the first volume of Mysterious Joker

怪盗ジョーカー (Kaitō Jōkā)
- Manga
- Written by: Hideyasu Takahashi
- Published by: Shogakukan
- Imprint: Tentōmushi CoroCoro Comics
- Magazine: Bessatsu CoroCoro Comic Special; CoroCoro Comic; CoroCoro Dragon
- Original run: April 2007 – September 2019
- Volumes: 27
- Anime television series
- Directed by: Yukiyo Teramoto
- Written by: Dai Satō
- Music by: Yūsaku Tsuchiya
- Studio: Shin-Ei Animation (Note: Animation production assistance (アニメーション制作協力) for all episodes provided by Vega Entertainment.)
- Original network: Tokyo MX, Kids Station
- English network: SEA: Disney XD, Disney Channel
- Original run: October 6, 2014 – December 26, 2016
- Episodes: 52
- Manga

Mysterious Joker Encore
- Written by: Hideyasu Takahashi
- Published by: Shogakukan
- Magazine: Weekly CoroCoro Comic
- Original run: April 15, 2024 – December 15, 2024
- Volumes: 9
- Video game

Kaitō Joker: Toki o Koeru Kaitō to Ushinawareta Hōseki
- Developer: Bandai Namco Games
- Publisher: Bandai Namco Games
- Genre: Action
- Platform: Nintendo 3DS
- Released: JP: June 25, 2015

Mysterious Joker (Japanese: 怪盗ジョーカー, Hepburn: Kaitō Jōkā) is a Japanese manga series written and illustrated by Hideyasu Takahashi. The series was originally published as a one-shot, then later began serialization in Shogakukan's Bessatsu CoroCoro Comic Special, CoroCoro Comic, and CoroCoro Dragon manga magazines. An anime adaptation produced by Asatsu DK and animated by Shin-Ei Animation aired in Japan from October 6, 2014, to December 26, 2016. The series follows the adventures of a thief named Joker, who goes around the world stealing treasures with his apprentice Hachi, while avoiding traps set by the police.

== Characters ==
Joker (ジョーカー, Jōkā) / Jack Jones (ジャック・ジョーンズ, Jakku Jōnzu)
Voiced by: Ayumu Murase
A phantom thief who performs miracles, he likes to steal treasures that have high value. When not stealing treasures, he spends his free time rolling around lazily, watching TV, reading manga, and playing video games. He hates doing laundry, cleaning up, and cats. He also loves to eat curry dishes. Before he became a phantom thief, he lived in a mansion with his parents until they died in a plane crash (shot down by Clover), and was known as Jack Jones.
Also known as the "miracle maker", "phantom thief of miracles", or "magical boy" because of his wondrous miracles and his super smart brain.
He's dressed up like a girl before, which was a success, beautiful enough to make three men fall in love (but they all found out that he is a male since Joker told them), and he is good at make up too, which he always uses to disguise the scar over his left eye without anyone knowing it was there.
In the manga, Joker marries Queen and have a son and daughter in the future.
Hachi (ハチ)
Voiced by: Yumiko Kobayashi
Joker's ninja apprentice. He is happy-go-lucky and quite clumsy. He was born and raised in a ninja village, though he was a clumsy failure. He strongly adores Joker and makes sure to protect him. He refers to himself as Oira (オイラ) and tends to end his sentences with ssu (～っス), a shortened variant of Desu (です). He is very good at housework and cooking.
Spade (スペード, Supēdo) / King (キング, Kingu)
Voiced by: Hiro Shimono, Mizuki Watanabe (Childhood)
Joker's rival. He is a smart phantom thief who plans by collecting and researching information before acting. He is somewhat of a prankster and prideful in a different way from Joker. When he acts up too much, he often gets a fever. He trained together with Joker and Queen when they were young under Silver Heart.
Diamond Queen (ダイヤモンド・クイーン, Daiyamondo· Kuīn)
Voiced by: Miyuki Sawashiro
Silver Heart's "granddaughter". She is a phantom thief who trained alongside Joker and Spade. She is energetic, cheerful, and often gets into trouble. She is bad at cooking, but she is very skilled at using a knife. When she was a baby, she was known as Queen Emerald (クイーン・エメラルド Kuīn· Emerarudo) and her parents were murdered by a minister (Professor Clover in the anime). Feeling sorry for her, Silver Heart decided to raise her and changed her name to Diamond Queen. In the manga, she ends up marrying Joker and has two children: a son and daughter, in the future.
Silver Heart (シルバーハート, Shirubā Hāto)
Voiced by: Bin Shimada
The teacher of Joker, Spade, and Diamond Queen. He is a legendary phantom thief who has been called the Silver Magician. He is a genius, but has a sketchy personality and hates anything bothersome. Sometimes, he ends up hurting his back. In truth, he thinks of Joker and the others as his own real children and grandchildren and cares about them, but he won't admit it due to him being embarrassed. Before he became a phantom thief, he was a secret agent for the French government, Agent Silver. He lost his left eye on a mission and encounter with Agent Clover (Professor Clover), and has worn a monocle since. He's also been on missions with a fellow agent, Agent Purple, such as taking down Jackal, before that. In the anime adaptation, he often breaks the fourth wall to explain certain important events in the episode, such as the tricks Joker performs. As a running gag throughout the series, it often features him breaking his back.
Dark Eye (ダーク・アイ, Dāku· Ai) / Ai (アイ, Ai)
Voiced by: Kenichi Ono, Yumi Hara (Ai)
Spade's assistant. Like Hachi, he is very good at housework and cooking. He is very reliable when it comes to supporting Spade's acts. Dark Eye is actually Ai, the eldest sister of the "Shuffle Sisters", an idol group.
Roko (ロコ)
Voiced by: Misaki Kuno
A dog who is always seen with Diamond Queen. Roko was part of an experiment to create genetically modified animals, which resulted on his abilities to speak and emit a destructive sound wave. Although Roko hangs with Queen, he was named by Joker, and such the two are good friends. The origin of his name comes from a Corn of Japanese word being Tomorokoshi (トウモロコシ). His experiment number is 101.
Phoenix (フェニックス, Feniksu)
Voiced by: Yoshitsugu Matsuoka
Also known as Akai Tsubasa, Phoenix is an alien who has been stranded on Earth for more than 10,000 years, on a quest to find his spaceship in order to return home, and in that, he often comes into contact and clashes with Joker throughout their respective attempts to find the treasure - Phoenix's spaceship.
Hosshi (ホッシー, Hoshii)
Voiced by: Atsumi Tanezaki
Real name Acrux, Hosshi is an alien, cat-like who was the old companion of Phoenix who takes a liking to Joker and Hachi, thus accompanying them since their initial contact.
Dogusaburō Oniyama (鬼山毒三郎, Oniyama Dogusaburō)
Voiced by: Naoki Tatsuta
The head of the police department's anti-phantom thief department. He despises Joker and tries his hardest to capture him, however, his attempts almost always backfire on him. Despite often being played for comic relief, he has his moments of seriousness. Oniyama takes his work seriously, and his dedication and strong morals have earned him Joker's respect. His last name is a pun on the Japanese yōkai Oni. He has an only daughter named Haruka Oniyama. Despite constantly being at ends with each other, Oniyama has been shown to care for Joker, such as being worried when Joker was poisoned and when he desperately called Joker to warn him as missiles were fired towards him.
Ginko Kurosaki (黒崎ギンコ, Kurosaki Ginko)
Voiced by: Yuko Hara
A police officer who assists Oniyama.
Momo Shirai (白井モモ, Shirai Momo)
Voiced by: Haruna Sakurai
A young police officer who also assists Oniyama.
Kyotarō Hayami (速水京太郎, Hayami Kyotarō)
Voiced by: Ryota Asari
A genius high school student-detective who has paraplegia.
Professor Clover (プロフェッサー・C(クローバー), Purofessā· Kurōbā)
Voiced by: Jūrōta Kosugi
The leader of his gang of violent, criminal thieves. He often thinks up villainous deeds and is the one responsible for the murder of Joker, Spade and Queen's parents. Before becoming Professor Clover, he was an agent of the Federation, Agent Clover, who was defeated by Agent Silver (Silver Heart) 50 years before the events of the series. In that mission, he lost his right arm in an encounter with Agent Silver and has a weaponized, mechanical metal arm as a replacement since.
Lady Doubt (レディー・ダウト, Redī· Dauto)
Voiced by: Jenya
Professor Clover's shapeshifting cat assistant. She is extremely loyal to the Professor.
Shadow Joker (S（シャドウ）・ジョーカー, Shadō· Jōkā) / Cyan (シアン, Shian)
Voiced by: Sōma Saitō
A rival phantom thief who looks similar to Joker. He once worked for Professor Clover and Lady Doubt.
Mister Kaneari (ミスター金有, Misutā Kaneari)
Voiced by: Nobuo Tobita
The representative of the Gold Group. He's very wealthy and uses most of his money to set up traps to defeat phantom thieves that come to steal his treasure, Joker and company in particular. He has a stuffed teddy bear whose nose acts like a switch and an explosive device and usually when Joker steals his treasure he accidentally punches its face making the location he is in explode, including his mansion, yacht, restaurant and hot spring.
Kaneko (カネ子)
Voiced by: Aki Kanada
A 20-year old lady who assists Mister Kaneari. In season 3, she's revealed to be able to turn into her true self Commando Satsuko, a huge muscled warrior who has reached the full potential of her feminine virtues.
Rose (ローズ)
Voiced by: Akane Uchino
Shadow Joker/Cyan's twin sister. She is actually a witch with time manipulation abilities.
DJ Peacock (DJ・ピーコック, DJ· Pīkokku)
Voiced by: Masahito Yabe
A hyperactive announcer who provides daily reports at the Underworld Net News (裏社会ネットニュース Urashakai Netto Nyūsu).
Princess Paprika (パプリカ姫, Papurika Hime)
Voiced by: Fumiko Orikasa
The young, peace-loving monarch of the Saffron Kingdom.
President D (プレジデントD, Purezidanto D)
Voiced by: Daisuke Kishio
Leader of the evil organization named Devil's Fang.
Spider Ace (スパイダー・A, Supaida Eisu)
Voiced by: Yasuaki Takumi
Devil's Fang's second in-command.
Red Scorpion (赤サソリ, Aka Sasori)
Voiced by: Akio Suyama
Member of Devil's Fang who attacks with poison. He later betrays Devil's Fang to join Doctor Neo.
Candy (キャンディー, Kyandi)
Voiced by: Marie Miyake
Member of Devil's Fang who always fails her assassination mission.
Nightmare (ナイトメア, Naitomea)
Voiced by: Kohsuke Toriumi
Member of Devil's Fang who can control people's mind with his special mask.
Mini-mini King (ミニミニ王, Mini-mini Oh)
Voiced by: Yoku Shioya
Member of Devil's Fang who can make anything into minimum size with his minimize blaster. He gets mad when someone calls him "small".
Doctor Neo (ドクターネオ, Dokuta Neo)
Voiced by: Takehito Koyasu
The mad scientist who seemingly works for Devil's Fang. In fact, he was the leader of another evil organization named Jackal, who were behind Devil's Fang in order to achieve their true purpose.

== Media ==
=== Manga ===
Written and illustrated by Hideyasu Takahashi, the Mysterious Joker manga began as a one-shot. It was later serialized in Shogakukan's Bessatsu Corocoro Comic Special, then moved to Corocoro Comic. The chapters were collected into 26 tankōbon volumes, which were released under Shogakukan's Tentōmushi Corocoro Comics imprint in Japan, from March 28, 2008, to September 15, 2017. There is also a sequel series set in the future after the events of the original series, centered on Joker's son Kaitou J: Kaitou Shounen Jokers (怪盗少年ジョーカーズ).

A spin-off manga titled Mysterious Joker Encore began serialization on the Weekly Corocoro Comic website on April 15, 2024.

=== Anime ===
An anime adaptation produced by Asatsu DK, animated by Shin-Ei Animation, written by Dai Satō, and directed by Yukiyo Teramoto aired in Japan on Tokyo MX from October 6, 2014, to January 5, 2015. The series has also aired on Kids Station since October 16, 2014. The series was simulcasted by Crunchyroll under the title Joker. The series' opening theme is "Kaitō Miracle Shōnen Boy" (怪盗ミラクル少年ボーイ Phantom Thief Miracle Young Boy) by Aruka Rider, and the ending theme is "Parade Illusion" (パレード・イリュージョン) by Mainya, with the Shuffle Sisters. The music in the series is composed by Yūsaku Tsuchiya. The February 2015 issue of Bessatsu CoroCoro Comic announced that the series has been green-lit for a second season, which would premiere in April 2015. The second 2015 issue of CoroCoro announced that the second season would premiere on April 6, 2015. A 3rd season aired in April 2016, while the 4th TV season aired in October 2016.

An official English dub of the series premiered on Disney XD Asia on August 6, 2016. On February 24, 2021, Cinedigm announced they would stream the series on their CONtv service in North America.

=== Video games ===
A Nintendo 3DS video game based on the series entitled Kaitō Joker: Toki o Koeru Kaitō to Ushinawareta Hōseki (怪盗ジョーカー 時を超える怪盗と失われた宝石 Mysterious Joker: The Phantom Thief Who Crosses Time & the Lost Gem) was developed by Bandai Namco Games and released on June 25, 2015, in Japan.

== Reception ==
The series was awarded the 58th Shogakukan Manga Award in the Children's Category.

The series has received generally positive reviews, with praise for its art style, characters and unorthodox mix of light-hearted elements with dark undertones, but criticism of its pacing.
