= Girls und Panzer das Finale =

Japanese animated film series by Tsutomu Mizushima

- Kanji: ガールズ&パンツァー 最終章
- Revised Hepburn: Gāruzu ando Pantsā: Sai Shūshō
- Directed by: Tsutomu Mizushima
- Screenplay by: Reiko Yoshida
- Produced by: Kiyoshi Sugiyama^{P1}; Kazuyoshi Nishikawa; Yōichi Sekine^{P1}; Tomoyo Kamiji^{P1}; Takeshi Ishigaki^{P1} ^{P2}; Rei Torī^{P2} ^{P3} ^{P4}; Yoshinori Hasegawa^{P2} ^{P3} ^{P4}; Yoko Baba^{P3}; Yuki Tezuka^{P4}; Hiroto Sakami^{P4}
- Cinematography: Yoshihiro Sekiya^{P1} ^{P2} ^{P3}; Hyo Gyu Park^{P1} ^{P5}; Kōhei Tanada^{P2} ^{P3} ^{P4}; Rikuhiro Sukegawa^{P5}
- Edited by: Masato Yoshitake
- Music by: Shirō Hamaguchi
- Production company: Actas
- Distributed by: Showgate
- Release dates: December 9, 2017 (Part 1); June 15, 2019 (Part 2); March 26, 2021 (Part 3); October 6, 2023 (Part 4); October 9, 2026 (Part 5)
- Running time: Total (5 films): 258 minutes
- Country: Japan
- Language: Japanese
- Box office: Total (5 films): ¥2.9 billion

Girls und Panzer das Finale (Note: Japanese: ガールズ&パンツァー 最終章, Hepburn: Gāruzu ando Pantsā: Sai Shūshō; lit. 'Girls und Panzer: The Final Chapter') is a six-part Japanese animated film series and a sequel to the 2012 anime series Girls und Panzer and 2015 anime film Girls und Panzer der Film. Produced by Actas and distributed by Showgate, the film series was directed by Tsutomu Mizushima from a script written by Reiko Yoshida and features an ensemble cast from previous installments of the franchise.

The film series follows the students of Ōarai Girls' Academy helping Momo Kawashima with her university entrance by winning the Winter Continuous Track Cup. With Miho Nishizumi demoting to Vice-Commander to give her commanding position to Momo, Ōarai faces and defeats BC Freedom Academy, Chihatan Gakuen, and Keizoku High School, advancing to the finals against St. Gloriana Girls' College, where Alice Shimada transferred.

A sequel project for the franchise was greenlit in August 2016. Although the project was first teased as a standalone film in September 2016, the format was revealed to be a six-part film series in November. The first film in the series was completed four days before its premiere in December 2017. That month, Mizushima began working on the second film, which was completed in June 2019. Production on the third film continued in May 2020 despite the COVID-19 pandemic, which was completed in March 2021. Production on the fourth film began in April 2021 and was completed in September 2023. That month, Mizushima began working on the fifth film, which was completed in August 2026. Production on the sixth film began in September 2024.

Five films in the Girls und Panzer das Finale series have been released in Japan since 2017: Part 1 on December 9, 2017, Part 2 on June 15, 2019, Part 3 on March 26, 2021, Part 4 on October 6, 2023, and Part 5 on October 9, 2026. The film series has grossed around ¥2.9 billion in Japan and received nominations at Newtype Anime Awards and Tokyo Anime Awards Festival.

== Films ==
=== Part 1 ===
As winter arrives, Momo Kawashima is determined to find Ōarai Girls' Academy's missing ninth tank. However, news travels throughout the school that Momo has not been accepted by any universities, resulting in a misleading rumor that she might be held back. Miho Nishizumi and her friends figure that they can get Momo accepted into the same university as Anzu Kadotani and Yuzu Koyama if they can demonstrate that Momo is skilled at Sensha-dō. To achieve this, they name Momo as the commander of Ōarai's tank teams and join the Winter Continuous Track Cup. Anglerfish Team travels below the aircraft carrier's deck to find the tank and wins the challenges set by a delinquent group led by Ogin. Learning of Momo's predicament, Ogin's group decides to join them, forming the Shark Team, to repay their debt to Momo for saving them from expulsion. They also recover the missing Mark IV tank being used as a smokehouse. Ōarai faces off against BC Freedom Academy at the start of the tournament. Yukari Akiyama learns through surveillance that the BC Freedom students are deeply divided between the original students and the high school transfer students, with their commander Marie seemingly oblivious of the situation. Confident that BC Freedom lacks the teamwork for a coordinated defense, Ōarai undertakes a direct attack on their flag tank. However, BC Freedom demonstrates an unexpected esprit de corps and traps Ōarai in a crossfire on a bridge. Ōarai uses Shark Team's tank as a makeshift bridge to escape. BC Freedom and Ōarai retreat following the failed ambush.

=== Part 2 ===
After escaping BC Freedom's ambush, Ōarai uses Mallard Team's Renault Char B1 and the cover of a bocage's hedgerows to pose as a BC Freedom tank and reignite the quarrel between their students. Exploiting their opponent's temporary confusion, Ōarai takes out Marie's flag tank and wins the match. While on a break before the next match, Saori Takebe accompanies Momo to her home and meets her four siblings and her frail mother. Meanwhile, Chihatan Gakuen, Pravda Girls' High School, Saunders University High School, Kuromorimine Girls' High School, St. Gloriana Girls' College, Anzio Girls' High School, and Keizoku High School advance to the next round. Ōarai's next opponent is Chihatan, which adapts a new set of effective tactics that they learned from Ōarai's examples. Chihatan uses hit-and-run attacks and amphibious assaults to launch numerous ambushes on Ōarai, but the latter forces their retreat after luring them into a trap.

=== Part 3 ===
After regrouping, Chihatan resumes its hit-and-run attacks on Ōarai. Chihatan's commander Kinuyo Nishi decides to focus on taking out Anglerfish Team to destroy Ōarai's morale. Ōarai tank teams quickly become separated in the confusion and multiple skirmishes take place. Miho decides to turn on her tank's headlight to expose her location and draw all of the Chihatan tanks towards her. As Chihatan celebrates after disabling Anglerfish Team's tank, Turtle Team, Ōarai's flag tank, comes out of hiding and disables Kinuyo's tank, winning the match in the process. In other matches, Kuromorimine defeats Pravda after Erika Itsumi followed Maho Nishizumi's advice and used her tactics that diverge from the school's traditional frontal attack, St. Gloriana easily defeats Anzio, and Keizoku manages to pull an upset victory against Saunders. This leaves Ōarai to face off against Keizoku and Kuromorimine against St. Gloriana in the semifinals. At the outset of the third match, Keizoku uses hit-and-run attacks and guerilla tactics against Ōarai, splitting their forces as a result. As Anglerfish Team protects the Anteater Team, their flag tank, one of the Keizoku's tank team, commanded by the one known as the "White Witch", disables Miho's tank with a single long-range shot.

=== Part 4 ===
The quick elimination of the Anglerfish Team sinks the morale of Ōarai and sends shockwaves to viewers of the game. Anzu takes an impromptu role as commander to keep the team from falling apart and has their tanks protect the Anteater Team by digging trenches in the snow. After discovering an abandoned underground aqueduct for escape, Azusa Sawa takes over as the new commander when the Turtle Team's tank is taken out by the "White Witch", Jouko. Sawa leads the Ōarai tank teams to weed out Jouko and eliminate her, through baiting tactics. With Sawa's commands, she allows Ōarai tanks to outnumber Keizoku's flagship tank, Mika. However, Mika lures them into a trap, causing both Keizoku's and Ōarai's tanks to plunge down the side of a mountain. As the two teams fight, while sliding down the mountainside, an avalanche takes out all but the Anteater Team and two Keizoku tanks, including Mika. Keizoku chases Ōarai into a village, where they are tricked by a diversion allowing the Anteater Team to eliminate Keizoku's flagship tank and win the match. Meanwhile, Kuromorimine and St. Gloriana face each other in the semifinals. Darjeeling overwhelms Erika, by spreading Kuromorimine's teams apart. Before St. Gloriana can corner Kuromorimine, a sandstorm allows Erika to regroup and bring the match to an even playing field. St. Gloriana then introduces their new transfer student, Alice Shimada, who enacts a decisive blow on Kuromorimine and wins the match, deciding the final match between St. Gloriana and Ōarai.

=== Part 5 ===
Ōarai faces off against St. Gloriana, led by Darjeeling and where Alice transferred, in the final match of the Winter Continuous Track Cup.

== Cast and staff ==
=== Voice cast ===
This section includes characters who have appeared in more than two films in the series.

- An empty, dark grey cell indicates the character was not in the film.
- A green cell indicates the voice actor is a Japanese cast member.
- A white cell indicates the voice actor is an English dub cast member.

Character	Part 1	Part 2	Part 3	Part 4
Ōarai Girls' Academy
Miho Nishizumi	Mai Fuchigami	Mai Fuchigami	Mai Fuchigami	Mai Fuchigami
Miho Nishizumi	Margaret McDonald	Margaret McDonald	Margaret McDonald	TBA
Saori Takebe	Ai Kayano	Ai Kayano	Ai Kayano	Ai Kayano
Saori Takebe	Jessica Calvello	Jessica Calvello	Jessica Calvello	TBA
Hana Isuzu	Mami Ozaki	Mami Ozaki	Mami Ozaki	Mami Ozaki
Hana Isuzu	Caitlynn French	Caitlynn French	Caitlynn French	TBA
Yukari Akiyama	Ikumi Nakagami	Ikumi Nakagami	Ikumi Nakagami	Ikumi Nakagami
Yukari Akiyama	Rebekah Stevens	Rebekah Stevens	Rebekah Stevens	TBA
Mako Reizei	Yuka Iguchi	Yuka Iguchi	Yuka Iguchi	Yuka Iguchi
Mako Reizei	Molly Searcy	Molly Searcy	Molly Searcy	TBA
Anzu Kadotani	Misato Fukuen	Misato Fukuen	Misato Fukuen	Misato Fukuen
Anzu Kadotani	Christina Stroup	Christina Stroup	Chelsea McCurdy	TBA
Yuzu Koyama	Mikako Takahashi	Mikako Takahashi	Mikako Takahashi	Mikako Takahashi
Yuzu Koyama	Serena Varghese	Serena Varghese	Meaghan Avacato	TBA
Momo Kawashima	Kana Ueda	Kana Ueda	Kana Ueda	Kana Ueda
Momo Kawashima	Elizabeth Maxwell	Elizabeth Maxwell	Elizabeth Maxwell	TBA
Noriko Isobe	Mika Kikuchi	Mika Kikuchi	Mika Kikuchi	Mika Kikuchi
Noriko Isobe	Genevieve Simmons	Genevieve Simmons	Genevieve Simmons	TBA
Taeko Kondō	Maya Yoshioka	Maya Yoshioka	Maya Yoshioka	Maya Yoshioka
Taeko Kondō	Kalin Coates	Kalin Coates	Kalin Coates	TBA
Shinobu Kawanishi	Mari Kirimura	Mari Kirimura	Mari Kirimura	Mari Kirimura
Shinobu Kawanishi	Cynthia Martinez	Cynthia Martinez	TBA	TBA
Akebi Sasaki	Sakura Nakamura	Sakura Nakamura	Sakura Nakamura	Sakura Nakamura
Akebi Sasaki	Carli Mosier	Carli Mosier	Carli Mosier	TBA
Takako Suzuki / Caesar	Eri Sendai	Eri Sendai	Eri Sendai	Eri Sendai
Takako Suzuki / Caesar	Shannon Emerick	Shannon Emerick	Shannon Emerick	TBA
Riko Matsumoto / Erwin	Satomi Moriya	Satomi Moriya	Satomi Moriya	Satomi Moriya
Riko Matsumoto / Erwin	Luci Christian	Luci Christian	Luci Christian	TBA
Kiyomi Sugiyama / Saemonza	Yuka Inoue	Yuka Inoue	Yuka Inoue	Yuka Inoue
Kiyomi Sugiyama / Saemonza	Joanne Bonasso	Joanne Bonasso	Tiffany Terrell	TBA
Takeko Nogami / Oryō	Ayuru Ōhashi	Ayuru Ōhashi	Ayuru Ōhashi	Ayuru Ōhashi
Takeko Nogami / Oryō	Elissa Cuellar	Elissa Cuellar	Elissa Cuellar	TBA
Azusa Sawa	Hitomi Takeuchi	Hitomi Takeuchi	Hitomi Takeuchi	Hitomi Takeuchi
Azusa Sawa	Allison Sumrall	Allison Sumrall	Allison Sumrall	TBA
Ayumi Yamagō	Nozomi Nakazato	Nozomi Nakazato	Nozomi Nakazato	Nozomi Nakazato
Ayumi Yamagō	Savanna Menzel	Savanna Menzel	Savanna Menzel	TBA
Karina Sakaguchi	Konomi Tada	Konomi Tada	Konomi Tada	Konomi Tada
Karina Sakaguchi	Monica Rial	Monica Rial	Monica Rial	TBA
Yūki Utsugi	Yuri Yamaoka	Yuri Yamaoka	Yuri Yamaoka	Yuri Yamaoka
Yūki Utsugi	Maggie Flecknoe	Maggie Flecknoe	Maggie Flecknoe	TBA
Aya Ōno	Chuna	Chuna	Chuna	Chuna
Aya Ōno	Juliet Simmons	Juliet Simmons	Juliet Simmons	TBA
Midoriko Sono	Shiori Izawa	Shiori Izawa	Shiori Izawa	Shiori Izawa
Midoriko Sono	Tiffany Grant	Tiffany Grant	Tiffany Grant	TBA
Moyoko Gotō	Shiori Izawa	Shiori Izawa	Shiori Izawa	Shiori Izawa
Moyoko Gotō	Shelley Calene-Black	Shelley Calene-Black	Shelley Calene-Black	TBA
Nozomi Konparu	Shiori Izawa	Shiori Izawa	Shiori Izawa	Shiori Izawa
Nozomi Konparu	Emily Neves	Emily Neves	Emily Neves	TBA
Reira Nakajima	Nozomi Yamamoto	Nozomi Yamamoto	Nozomi Yamamoto	Nozomi Yamamoto
Reira Nakajima	Juliet Simmons	Juliet Simmons	Juliet Simmons	TBA
Maria Suzuki	Mai Ishihara	Mai Ishihara	Mai Ishihara	Mai Ishihara
Maria Suzuki	Brittney Karbowski	Brittney Karbowski	Brittney Karbowski	TBA
Keiko Hoshino	Hisako Kanemoto	Hisako Kanemoto	Hisako Kanemoto	Hisako Kanemoto
Keiko Hoshino	Chaney Moore	Chaney Moore	TBA	TBA
Muuton Tsuchiya	Eri Kitamura	Eri Kitamura	Eri Kitamura	Eri Kitamura
Muuton Tsuchiya	Luci Christian	Luci Christian	Luci Christian	TBA
Mai Nekota / Nekonyā	Ikumi Hayama	Ikumi Hayama	Ikumi Hayama	Ikumi Hayama
Mai Nekota / Nekonyā	Monica Rial	Monica Rial	Monica Rial	TBA
Taki Momose / Momogā	Masayo Kurata	Masayo Kurata	Masayo Kurata	Masayo Kurata
Taki Momose / Momogā	Olivia Swasey	Olivia Swasey	Olivia Swasey	TBA
Aoi Hiyoshi / Piyotan	Sumire Uesaka	Sumire Uesaka	Sumire Uesaka	Sumire Uesaka
Aoi Hiyoshi / Piyotan	Amelia Fischer	Maggie Flecknoe	Maggie Flecknoe	TBA
Ogin	Ayane Sakura	Ayane Sakura	Ayane Sakura	Ayane Sakura
Ogin	Dawn M. Bennett	Dawn M. Bennett	Dawn M. Bennett	TBA
Rum	Natsumi Takamori	Natsumi Takamori	Natsumi Takamori	Natsumi Takamori
Rum	Sarah Wiedenheft	Sarah Wiedenheft	Sarah Wiedenheft	TBA
Murakami	Yō Taichi	Yō Taichi	Yō Taichi	Yō Taichi
Murakami	Morgan Berry	Morgan Berry	Morgan Berry	TBA
Flint	Madoka Yonezawa	Madoka Yonezawa	Madoka Yonezawa	Madoka Yonezawa
Flint	Amber Lee Connors	Amber Lee Connors	Amber Lee Connors	TBA
Cutlass	Ami Nanase	Ami Nanase	Ami Nanase	Ami Nanase
Cutlass	Alyssa Marek	Alyssa Marek	Alyssa Marek	TBA
BC Freedom Academy
Marie	Yumi Hara	Yumi Hara	Yumi Hara	
Marie	Cat Thomas	Cat Thomas	Cat Thomas	
Ando	Minami Tsuda	Minami Tsuda	Minami Tsuda	
Ando	Alexis Tipton	Alexis Tipton	Alexis Tipton	
Oshida	Chika Anzai	Chika Anzai	Chika Anzai	
Oshida	Avery Smithhart	Avery Smithhart	Jade Kelly	
St. Gloriana Girls' College
Darjeeling	Eri Kitamura	Eri Kitamura	Eri Kitamura	Eri Kitamura
Darjeeling	Kara Greenberg	Kara Greenberg	Kara Greenberg	TBA
Orange Pekoe	Mai Ishihara	Mai Ishihara	Mai Ishihara	Mai Ishihara
Orange Pekoe	Christina Kelly	Christina Kelly	Christina Kelly	TBA
Assam	Satomi Akesaka		Satomi Akesaka	Satomi Akesaka
Assam	Joanne Bonasso		Brittney Karbowski	TBA
Rosehip	Natsumi Takamori		Natsumi Takamori	Natsumi Takamori
Rosehip	Emily Neves		Emily Neves	TBA
Alice Shimada		Ayana Taketatsu		Ayana Taketatsu
Alice Shimada		Shanae'a Moore		TBA
Saunders University High School
Kay	Ayako Kawasumi	Ayako Kawasumi	Ayako Kawasumi	
Kay	Emily Neves	Emily Neves	Emily Neves	
Naomi	Mariya Ise		Mariya Ise	
Naomi	Shelley Calene-Black		Patricia Duran	
Alisa	Aya Hirano		Aya Hirano	
Alisa	Brittney Karbowski		Brittney Karbowski	
Pravda Girls' High School
Katyusha	Hisako Kanemoto		Hisako Kanemoto	Hisako Kanemoto
Katyusha	Hilary Haag		Hilary Haag	TBA
Nonna	Sumire Uesaka		Sumire Uesaka	Sumire Uesaka
Nonna	Olga Jankowski		Shannon Emerick	TBA
Klara	Jenya		Jenya	Jenya
Klara	Sarah Natochenny		Christina Kelly	TBA
Kuromorimine Girls' High School
Maho Nishizumi	Rie Tanaka		Rie Tanaka	
Maho Nishizumi	Kim Prause		Kim Prause	
Erika Itsumi	Hitomi Nabatame	Hitomi Nabatame	Hitomi Nabatame	Hitomi Nabatame
Erika Itsumi	Katelyn Barr	Katelyn Barr	Katelyn Barr	TBA
Koume Akaboshi		Eri Sendai	Eri Sendai	Eri Sendai
Koume Akaboshi		Melissa Molano	Ellen Evans	TBA
Emi Kozima		Ikumi Hayama	Ikumi Hayama	Ikumi Hayama
Emi Kozima		Olivia Swasey	Olivia Swasey	TBA
Anna Iruma			Sumire Uesaka	Sumire Uesaka
Anna Iruma			TBA	TBA
Anzio Girls' High School
Anchovy	Maya Yoshioka	Maya Yoshioka	Maya Yoshioka	Maya Yoshioka
Anchovy	Kira Vincent-Davis	Kira Vincent-Davis	Kira Vincent-Davis	TBA
Carpaccio	Saori Hayami	Saori Hayami	Saori Hayami	Saori Hayami
Carpaccio	Christina Stroup	Christina Stroup	Chelsea McCurdy	TBA
Pepperoni	Yō Taichi	Yō Taichi	Yō Taichi	Yō Taichi
Pepperoni	Christina Kelly	Christina Kelly	Christina Kelly	TBA
Chihatan Gakuen
Kinuyo Nishi	Asami Seto	Asami Seto	Asami Seto	Asami Seto
Kinuyo Nishi	Alexis Lee	Suzie Yeung	Chrsity Guidry	TBA
Tamaki Tamada	Madoka Yonezawa	Madoka Yonezawa	Madoka Yonezawa	Madoka Yonezawa
Tamaki Tamada	Chaney Moore	Chaney Moore	Chaney Moore	TBA
Shizuko Hosomi	Ami Nanase	Ami Nanase	Ami Nanase	Ami Nanase
Shizuko Hosomi	Joanne Bonasso	Joanne Bonasso	Joanne Bonasso	TBA
Emi Ikeda	Konomi Tada	Konomi Tada	Konomi Tada	
Emi Ikeda	Genevieve Simmons	Genevieve Simmons	Genevieve Simmons	
Noriyo Hamada	Yuka Inoue	Yuka Inoue	Yuka Inoue	
Noriyo Hamada	Monica Rial	Whitney Rodgers	Whitney Rodgers	
Tomiko Teramoto	Ikumi Hayama	Ikumi Hayama	Ikumi Hayama	
Tomiko Teramoto	Mai Le	Mai Le	Mai Le	
Rin Kubota	Yō Taichi	Yō Taichi	Yō Taichi	
Rin Kubota	Emily Neves	Emily Neves	Emily Neves	
Haru Fukuda		Naomi Ōzora	Naomi Ōzora	Naomi Ōzora
Haru Fukuda		Terri Doty	Terri Doty	TBA
Setsuko Nagura		Miho Ishigami	Miho Ishigami	
Setsuko Nagura		Kara Greenberg	Kara Greenberg	
Yasoko Nishihara		Yuka Inoue	Yuka Inoue	
Yasoko Nishihara		Kristen McGuire	Kristen McGuire	
Keizoku High School
Mika	Mamiko Noto	Mamiko Noto	Mamiko Noto	Mamiko Noto
Mika	Allison Sumrall	Lauren Herink	Kelly Greenshield	TBA
Aki	Shino Shimoji	Shino Shimoji	Shino Shimoji	Shino Shimoji
Aki	Melissa Molano	Melissa Molano	Melissa Molano	TBA
Mikko		Miho Ishigami	Miho Ishigami	Miho Ishigami
Mikko		Jenny Strader	Jenny Strader	TBA
Japan Ground Self-Defense Force
Ami Chōno	Hekiru Shiina	Hekiru Shiina	Hekiru Shiina	Hekiru Shiina
Ami Chōno		Shelley Calene-Black	TBA	TBA
Chitose Hachiya			Minami Tsuda	Minami Tsuda
Chitose Hachiya			TBA	TBA
Hand-picked University Team
Azumi	Yuko Iida	Yuko Iida	Yuko Iida	
Azumi	Melissa Pritchett	Melissa Pritchett	Melissa Pritchett	

=== Staff ===
Staff	Part 1	Part 2	Part 3	Part 4	Part 5
Director	Tsutomu Mizushima				
Screenwriter	Reiko Yoshida				
Original character designer	Fumikane Shimada				
Chief animation director and character designer	Isao Sugimoto				
Historical researcher and supervisor	Takaaki Suzuki				
Original character design assistant	Takeshi Nogami				
Military works	Takeshi Itou				
Prop designer	Takao Takegami, Noriko Ogura, Momoko Makiuchi, and Kanta Suzuki				
3D director	Keiichiro Yagino				
Modeling draft	Keiji Harada and Arkpilot				
3DCGI	Graphinica				
3DCGI		Studio Katyusha			
Color designer	Sachiko Harada				
Art director	Satoru Hirayanagi				
Director of photography	Yoshihiro Sekiya				
Director of photography	Hyo Gyu Park				Hyo Gyu Park
Director of photography		Kōhei Tanada			
Director of photography					Rikuhiro Sukegawa
Editor	Masato Yoshitake				
Sound director	Yoshikazu Iwanami				
Sound effects	Yasumasa Koyama				
Recording adjustment	Takayuki Yamaguchi				
Composer	Shirō Hamaguchi				
Animation studio	Actas				
Distributor	Showgate				

== Production ==
In August 2016, the production for the sequel to Girls und Panzer der Film was announced. The following month, producer Kiyoshi Sugiyama teased the format of the project would be a standalone film, but he later retracted his comment and apologized for causing a confusion. The format was revealed in November 2016 to be a series of six films. Screenwriter Reiko Yoshida revealed that the sequel was intended to be an original video animation. When it became a six-part film series, Yoshida began writing the script starting from the last film and finishing at the first film to adjust the overall length of the story.

The dubbing for the first film, titled Girls und Panzer das Finale: Part 1, was completed in July 2017. In October 2017, the new cast were revealed, namely Yumi Hara as Marie, Minami Tsuda as Ando, Chika Anzai as Oshida, and Ayane Sakura as a "mysterious new character". The film was completed in December 2017, four days before its release. That month, Sakura's character was revealed to be Ogin, along with Natsumi Takamori, Yō Taichi, Madoka Yonezawa, and Ami Nanase as Rum, Murakami, Flint, and Cutlass, respectively. Sentai Filmworks revealed the English staff and dub cast for the film in September 2021.

Director Tsutomu Mizushima began working on the second film, titled Girls und Panzer das Finale: Part 2, in December 2017. The staff used Unreal Engine 4 for the jungle match between Ōarai Girls' Academy and Chihatan Gakuen. Mizushima confirmed in May 2019 that the film was seven minutes longer than Part 1. The film was completed in June 2019. Sentai Filmworks revealed the English staff and dub cast for the film in December 2021.

In May 2020, production for the third film, titled Girls und Panzer das Finale: Part 3, was confirmed to be continuing amidst the COVID-19 pandemic, with Mizushima stating that the staff had begun to edit the film and prepare for the cast's dialogue recording. The dubbing began in September 2020 and was completed the following month. The film was completed in March 2021. Sentai Filmworks revealed the English staff and dub cast for the film in December 2022.

Production for the fourth film, titled Girls und Panzer das Finale: Part 4, began in April 2021. The dubbing was completed in June 2023. The final cut was finished in July 2023, with the film's runtime to be around 53 minutes. Studio Katyusha used 3DCG for about 800 cuts and Unreal Engine for another 600 or more cuts. In September 2023, Shion Wakayama was revealed to be voicing Jouko. That month, the film was completed. New characters were revealed in October 2023, namely Konomi Tada as Yuri, Ai Kayano as Tami, Ikumi Nakagami as Tomi, Nozomi Nakazato as Reino, Satomi Akesaka as Ari, Satomi Moriya as Hida, Sumire Uesaka as Iruma and Katsuya, Misato Fukuen as Cranberry, Kana Ueda as Vanilla, and Yuka Iguchi as Peach.

Mizushima began working on the fifth film, titled Girls und Panzer das Finale: Part 5, in September 2023. The dubbing began in August 2025. Rikuhiro Sukegawa, who is affiliated with MAPPA, joined the staff as one of the directors of photography in March 2026. The dubbing was completed in July 2026. The film was completed by August 2026, with Mizushima stating that new characters will appear in it. The new characters were revealed in October 2026, namely Lemongrass, voiced by Naomi Ōzora; Rooibos Tea, voiced by Satsuki Yukino; Uba, voiced by Yumi Tōma; Elderflower, voiced by Rie Tanaka; Coconut, voiced by Eri Sendai; BOP, voiced by Saori Hayami; and Dooard, voiced by Asami Seto.

Storyboarding for the sixth film, titled Girls und Panzer das Finale: Part 6, began in September 2024.

== Music ==
In July 2017, the title of the opening theme song for the first three films in the Girls und Panzer das Finale series was revealed as "Grand Symphony", performed by Sayaka Sasaki. That month, ChouCho was set to perform the opening theme song for the final three films. The CD for "Grand Symphony" was released in Japan on December 6, 2017. The ending theme song for the film series was titled "Enter Enter Mission! Das Finale ver." (Enter Enter MISSION！最終章ver., Enter Enter Mission! Sai Shūshō ver.), performed by Maho (Mai Fuchigami), Saori (Kayano), Hana (Mami Ozaki), Yukari (Nakagami), and Mako (Iguchi). Its CD was released in Japan on December 13, 2017. The original soundtrack album for the first three films, titled Girls und Panzer das Finale Episode 1–Episode 3 OST, was released in Japan on May 12, 2021.

In July 2023, the title of the opening theme song that would be used for the final three films was revealed as "Never Say Goodbye". Its CD was released in Japan on October 4, 2023.

== Marketing ==
An announcement video for the Girls und Panzer das Finale project was released online on September 16, 2016, which was first shown at Girls und Panzer Heartful Tank Carnival II event last month. In June 2017, a bus tour promoting the film series was held at Tsukuba Circuit during the D1 Grand Prix series, in which two cars of Pacific Racing Team with Girls und Panzer character designs participated. In October 2017, Sumitomo Mitsui Card Company announced that they would issue Mastercards designed with members of Anglerfish Team. In September 2023, JX Nippon Mining & Metals Corporation revealed a collaboration with the film series, in which they would promote it during the match between Mito HollyHock and Oita Trinita at the 2023 J2 League on September 23 and would release a commercial featuring the company mascot Copper-kun and the Anglerfish Team in early October.

In January 2024, Culture Entertainment announced the original goods based on the film series would be available on their online lottery Kuji Luck Online. Heiwa Corporation launched a smart pachislot machine based on the film series in February 2024 and a new pachinko machine, called "e-Girls und Panzer das Finale", in October 2025. In May 2024, a collaboration between the film series and the Japan Mölkky Association was announced; Mölkky is a game invented in Finland, the motif of Keizoku High School, and was featured in Part 4. The collaboration included standees of Mika and Jouko of Keizoku High School being displayed during the 2nd Mölkky Japan Open in Imabari, Ehime in June 2024 and goods being sold during the 2024 Mölkky World Championship in Hakodate, Hokkaido in August. Creative Plus released stickers and theme based on the film series for Line in December 2025.

A collaboration video with the 2026 American film The End of Oak Street was released in August. The video features Miho, Saori, and Yukari watching footage from the film and analyzing how to deal with the anomaly that is happening in it. Saori is reacting strongly to the anomaly while Miho is studying on how to deal with the dinosaurs. A collaboration event between the film series and the Central Japan Railway Company began in October 2026 and will last until February 2027. The event featured an exclusive original voice drama at the Tokaido Shinkansen, novelty items, a digital stamp rally in Nagoya, and merchandise at Animate Nagoya.

The film series had collaborations with companies and brands, namely Lawson, Tsutaya, Marui, Animate, Coco's, Daily Yamazaki, Morinaga Milk Industry, Sega, HMV, Joysound, Baskin-Robbins, Marion Crepes, Tower Records, Seiko, Cospa, Big Echo, Saza Coffee, Don Quijote, Sato Pharmaceutical, Kentex, and Pine Ame. It also had collaborations with video games, such as Vivid Army, World of Tanks, Sega Net Mahjong MJ, World Dai Star: Yume no Stellarium, Ekimemo!, Princess Connect! Re:Dive, and Shiro Project:RE.

== Release ==
=== Theatrical ===
Five films in the Girls und Panzer das Finale series have been released in Japan since 2017. Part 1 was released on December 9, 2017. Part 2 was released on June 15, 2019, and in Dolby Atmos and DTS:X theaters on August 16. Part 3 was released on March 26, 2021, and in 78 4DX and MX4D theaters on October 8. Part 4 was released in regular and Dolby Atmos theaters on October 6, 2023, and in 4D theaters on November 23. Part 5 was released on October 9, 2026, with screenings available in Dolby Cinema, Dolby Atmos, 4DX, and MX4D theaters.

=== Home media ===
The home videos of Girls und Panzer das Finale films were distributed by Bandai Namco Filmworks, under their label Emotion, in Japan, Sentai Filmworks in the United States and Canada, and MVM Entertainment in the United Kingdom.

Film	Format	Country	Release date	Ref(s)
Part 1	Blu-ray, DVD	Japan	March 23, 2018	
Part 1	Blu-ray	United States, Canada	September 14, 2021	
Part 1	Blu-ray	United Kingdom	April 11, 2022	
Part 2	Blu-ray, DVD	Japan	February 27, 2020	
Part 2	Blu-ray	United States, Canada	November 23, 2021	
Part 2	Blu-ray	United Kingdom	May 16, 2022	
Part 3	Blu-ray, DVD	Japan	December 24, 2021	
Part 3	Blu-ray	United States, Canada	September 20, 2022	
Part 3	Blu-ray	United Kingdom	October 31, 2022	
Part 4	Blu-ray, DVD	Japan	March 27, 2024	
Part 4	Blu-ray	United States, Canada	January 20, 2026	
Part 4	Blu-ray	United Kingdom	November 16, 2026	

The first four films were streamed on Hidive: Part 1 on December 13, 2021, Part 2 on February 21, 2022, Part 3 on December 19, and Part 4 on December 16, 2025.

== Reception ==
=== Box office ===
As of November 7, 2026, the five Girls und Panzer das Finale films have collectively grossed ¥2.9 billion in Japan and $171,152–254,015 in other territories. In the opening weekend, Part 1 earned ¥146 million, Part 2 earned ¥145 million, Part 3 earned ¥107 million, Part 4 earned ¥212 million, and Part 5 earned ¥267 million.

Film	Box office gross		Ref(s)
Film	Japan	Other territories	Ref(s)
Part 1	¥603 million	$37,388–81,337	
Part 2	¥553 million	$37,257	
Part 3	¥600 million	$45,204–45,392	
Part 4	¥582 million	$51,303–90,029	
Part 5	¥570 million	TBD	
Total	¥2.9 billion	$171,152–254,015	

=== Critical response ===
Ian Wolf of Anime UK News gave Girls und Panzer das Finale: Part 1 a score of 9 out of 10, praising the production, the comedy despite being "basic and based on stereotyping", the new characters that belonged to Shark Team, and the opening theme song. Regarding the whole film series, he felt "frustrat[ed]" about how it would be taking a long time to be completed due to a "two-year gap between each [films]" and suggested "mak[ing] a few longer films rather than many short ones". Wolf gave a similar score to Girls und Panzer das Finale: Part 2, praising the action scenes that he described as "thrilling, with unexpected twists and turns", the music, and the "slightly longer" runtime.

The Japanese review and survey firm Filmarks placed Girls und Panzer das Finale: Part 3 first in their first-day satisfaction ranking, with an average rating of 4.17/5, based on 284 reviews. Fuminobu Hata scored the film 9 out of 10 for IGN Japan, praising the tank action sequence, the "inductive flow and cliffhanger-style" direction for a 48-minute runtime, and the "exquisitely composed" sound. Wolf gave Part 3 a score of 8 out of 10, noting the use of mixed CGI during the scene taking place in the jungle and finding the characters being animated with CGI "disappointingly clunky". He found the action sequence "more substantial" as compared to Part 2.

Filmarks placed Girls und Panzer das Finale: Part 4 first in their first-day satisfaction ranking, with an average rating of 4.33/5, based on 477 reviews. Hata gave the film a score of 9 out of 10, lauding it for featuring tank battles that were "more gripping" than Part 3 from start to finish and noting the use of visuals to develop a story that had minimal dialogue. He also noted how the film explored the theme of "successor" (後継者, kōkeisha).

=== Accolades ===
In October 2018, Girls und Panzer das Finale: Part 1 and the film's mechanical animation director Takeshi Itou were nominated for Best Picture (Film) and Best Mechanical/Prop Design categories, respectively, at the Newtype Anime Awards. In December 2018, Part 1 was nominated by fans to win the Anime of the Year at Tokyo Anime Award Festival 2019. In October 2019, Itou and prop designers Takao Takegami, Noriko Ogura, Momoko Makiuchi, and Kanta Suzuki, who all worked on Girls und Panzer das Finale: Part 2, were nominated for Best Mechanical/Prop Design at the Newtype Anime Awards. In December 2021, Girls und Panzer das Finale: Part 3 was among the Top 100 Favorites nominated for the Anime of the Year at Tokyo Anime Award Festival 2022. In December 2022, Part 3's 4D version placed sixteenth among the top 20 Japanese animated films voted by fans to win the Anime of the Year at Tokyo Anime Award Festival 2023.

== Original video animations ==
The Blu-ray and DVD of Girls und Panzer das Finale: Part 2, Part 3, and Part 4 were bundled with original video animations. In September 2021, Saori Onishi and Azusa Tadokoro were revealed to be voicing Jane and Belle, respectively, in Daikon War! In February 2024, new characters and cast to be introduced in Commander War! were revealed, namely Kebiko as Minami Iinuma and Chinami Hashimoto as Sofia and Yūko.

No.	Title	Original release date
1	"Taiyaki War!"; Transliteration: "Taiyaki Wō!" (Japanese: タイヤキ・ウォー！)	February 27, 2020
Before the upcoming match of BC Freedom Academy against Ōarai Girl's Academy, Oshida informs Ando to close the street food stalls where she cooks and sells taiyaki since it badly reflects the school's appearance. Ando resists their demand since her fellow poor student cannot afford high-end foods sold in the cafeteria. Their conflict causes a riot until Marie mends their differences by eating a chocolate-filled taiyaki. She is later informed of infiltration by Yukari into the school so she orders everyone to act that the riot continues to fool her.
2	"Daikon War!"; Transliteration: "Daikon Wō!" (Japanese: ダイコン・ウォー！)	December 24, 2021
The Anglerfish Team heads to the Agriculture Department of Ōarai Girls' Academy to give Jane, the department's representative, printouts from the student council. They manage to find her dueling with an outlaw named Belle, who steals daikons. Belle reasons that she needs them to prepare pickled daikons since she is being rejected from obtaining them due to their unpopularity. After the issue is resolved, Miho invites Jane to join Senshadō as a gunner, but the latter refuses to remain as a sheriff in the department.
3	"Commander War!"; Transliteration: "Taichō Wō!" (Japanese: タイチョウ・ウォー！)	March 27, 2024
The Senshadō Club commanders from different schools hold a meeting to find ways in boosting popularity of sensha-dō. Miho suggests to create a PR video, similar to what her school have shown to attract new members. The commanders suggest the themes for the video, until Koala of the Koala Forest Academy recommends to make it cute. The Senshadō Club commanders then perform the song "Kawai Pretty Senshamichi" (Note: かわいいプリティー戦車道, Kawaī Puritī Senshamichi) along with Koala and Waterzooi of Waffle Academy as mascots, gaining attention online but failing to boost popularity for sensha-dō.

== Related books ==
=== Manga ===
==== Girls und Panzer das Finale: Heartful Tank Anthology ====
A manga anthology based on Girls und Panzer das Finale, titled Girls und Panzer das Finale: Heartful Tank Anthology (ガールズ&パンツァー 最終章 ハートフル・タンク・アンソロジー), was released by Kadokawa under their MF Comics Alive Series label. As of March 23, 2018, it has been published in a single volume in Japan.

==== Girls und Panzer das Finale: Keizoku Koukou Harapeko Shokuji-dō ====
A spin-off manga illustrated by Ashimoto Yoika, titled Girls und Panzer das Finale: Keizoku Koukou Harapeko Shokuji-dō (ガールズ&パンツァー 最終章 継続高校はらぺこ食事道; lit. 'Girls und Panzer das Finale: Keizoku High School Hungry Way of the Meal'), was serialized in Monthly Dengeki PlayStation Comic magazine from November 28, 2018, to March 28, 2020. It follows Keizoku High School students Mika, Aki, and Mikko struggling with their meals due to financial difficulties. The first volume was published in Japan on June 10, 2019, and the second and final volume was published on June 27, 2020.

=== Light novel ===
A light novel adaptation of Girls und Panzer das Finale by Media Factory, under their label MF Bunko J, was set to be published in Japan on March 25, 2024, but it was temporarily cancelled on the day of its release due to "various circumstances in the production process". It was later moved to December 25, 2024. The second volume was released on January 25, 2026. The light novel follows the events of the film series from Anzu's perspective.

== Works cited ==
- ^{P1} indicates the staff only worked on Girls und Panzer das Finale: Part 1.
- ^{P2} indicates the staff only worked on Girls und Panzer das Finale: Part 2.
- ^{P3} indicates the staff only worked on Girls und Panzer das Finale: Part 3.
- ^{P4} indicates the staff only worked on Girls und Panzer das Finale: Part 4.
- ^{P5} indicates the staff only worked on Girls und Panzer das Finale: Part 5.
