= Panzerlied =

German march song

Das Panzerlied
English: 'The Tank Song'
- Military anthem of the Panzerwaffe
- Music: Kurt Wiehle, 1933

Audio sample
- Instrumental rendition in A-flat minor: file; help

The "Panzerlied" ('Tank Song') is a German military march sung primarily by the Panzerwaffe—the tank force of Nazi Germany during World War II. It is one of the best-known songs of the Wehrmacht and was popularised by the 1965 film Battle of the Bulge. It was composed by Oberleutnant Kurt Wiehle in 1933.

It is still used today in the German, Chilean and Brazilian armies. In Sweden Panzerlied is still used by the Royal Swedish Life Guard Regiment.

== History ==
The "Tank Song" was composed in 1933 by Oberleutnant Kurt Wiehle. In 2017, the German Army was banned from publishing song books containing Panzerlied and other marching songs by the Minister of Defence Ursula von der Leyen as part of new efforts at denazification. However, as of 2025, the German Army has started to use the song again.

The song is sung by some motorised and parachute units of the Italian Army, most especially by the 185th Infantry Division "Folgore" under the title of "Sui Monti e Sui Mar". In France, the lyrics were adapted slightly to become the "Marche des Chars" used by the 501e régiment de chars de combat. The half portion of the song was used for Namibian German community patriotic song and unofficial anthem under South African rule, "The Southwestern Song". In the Brazilian Army, motorised and parachute units used the tune under the title "Canção da Tropa Blindada". A Spanish translation of the song is used by the Chilean Army as an armoured cavalry march, and by the Chilean Naval Academy as a pasacalle. The French Foreign Legion also has this song in their repertoire under the name Kepi Blanc.

The lyrics to "Panzerlied" were adapted to fit a Kriegsmarine song.

== Lyrics ==
German original

I
Ob’s stürmt oder schneit,
Ob die Sonne uns lacht,
Der Tag glühend heiß
Oder eiskalt die Nacht,
Bestaubt sind die Gesichter,
Doch froh ist unser Sinn,
Ja unser Sinn.
Es braust unser Panzer
Im Sturmwind dahin.

II
Mit donnernden Motoren,
Geschwind wie der Blitz,
Dem Feinde entgegen,
Im Panzer geschützt.
Voraus den Kameraden,
Im Kampf steh'n wir allein,
Steh'n wir allein,
So stoßen wir tief
In die feindlichen Reih'n.

III
Wenn vor uns ein feindliches
Heer dann erscheint,
Wird Vollgas gegeben
Und ran an den Feind!
Was gilt denn unser Leben
Für uns'res Reiches Heer?
Ja Reiches Heer
Für Deutschland zu sterben
Ist uns höchste Ehr'.

IV
Mit Sperren und Minen
Hält der Gegner uns auf,
Wir lachen darüber
Und fahren nicht drauf.
Und droh'n vor uns Geschütze,
Versteckt im gelben Sand,
Im gelben Sand,
Wir suchen uns Wege,
Die keiner sonst fand.

V
Und läßt uns im Stich
Einst das treulose Glück,
Und kehren wir nicht mehr
Zur Heimat zurück,
Trifft uns die Todeskugel,
Ruft uns das Schicksal ab,
Ja Schicksal ab,
Dann wird uns der Panzer
Ein ehernes Grab.

English translation

I
Whether it storms or snows,
Whether the sun smiles upon us,
In the scorching heat of the day,
Or the freezing cold of the night,
Dusty are our faces,
But joyful are our minds,
Yes, our minds.
There our tank roars,
Amidst the storm winds.

II
With thundering engines,
Quick as lightning,
Towards the enemy,
Protected in the tank.
Ahead of our comrades,
In combat alone we stand,
Alone we stand.
So deep we strike
Into the enemy's ranks.

III
If an enemy army
appears before us,
We shall go full throttle
and attack the enemy!
What then do our lives count for,
For our Reich's army?
Yes, Reich's army.
To die for Germany
Is our highest honour.

IV
With obstacles and mines
the opponent holds us up,
We laugh about it
and onto them, drive not.
And guns before us threaten,
Hidden in the yellow sand,
In the yellow sand.
We are looking for ways
No others have found.

V
And should we get abandoned
once by treacherous luck,
And return we will no more,
Back to home,
Hitting us, the deathly bullet,
Fate calls us away,
Yes, fate away.
Then becomes the tank for us,
an iron grave.
