= Rozie Curtis =

American choreographer

Rozanne Damone "Rozie" Curtis is an American choreographer and voice actress. She is mostly known for doing voiceovers in English dubs for Japanese anime and works with ADV Films and Seraphim Digital. Currently, she is the manager of community outreach for Theatre Under the Stars and associate director for Crosswind Productions.

== Filmography ==
=== Voice Roles ===
- AD Police - Kyoko Miyano
- All Purpose Cultural Cat Girl Nuku Nuku - Maho
- Clannad - Rie Nishima
- Clannad After Story - Rie Nishima (episode 13-14), Yagi (eps 15-16, 22), Additional Voices
- Compiler - Interpreter (as Rozanne Curtis)
- Cyber Team in Akihabara - Kamome's Mom (eps 7, 16), Magazine Stand Lady (ep 9)
- Demon King Daimao - Mitsuko Torii
- Generator Gawl - Masami
- Girls und Panzer - Anzu Kadotani
- Horizon in the Middle of Nowhere - Musashi
- Kill Me Baby - Agiri Goshiki
- Le Chevalier d'Eon - Additional Voices
- Legend of the Mystical Ninja - Rumie Himuro
- Mystical Detective Loki Ragnarok - Hel (ep 14)
- Needless - Kasumi Ogiha
- Pani Poni Dash - Behomi
- Saiyuki - Huang
- Samurai Girls - Kanetsugu Naoe (as Vestal Vee)
- Steel Angel Kurumi 2 - Uruka Sumeragi
- Street Fighter II V - Party Guest, Receptionist (ADV dub)
- Those Who Hunt Elves - Ritsuko Inoue

=== Live-Action Roles ===
- Paradise, Texas - Records Clerk, Choreographer (staff role)
