= Kim Prause =

American actress

- Born: Kimberly Prause
- Occupation: Voice actress

Kimberly Prause is an American voice actress and theatre actress. She has done several anime voice roles.

== Voice roles ==
- Air - Kano's Mother
- Akame ga Kill! - Client (Ep. 2), Spear (Ep. 7)
- Angelic Layer - Chitose Tanaka
- Aquarian Age: Sign for Evolution - Arayashiki East
- BASToF Syndrome - Cora
- Best Student Council - Eiko Nagai, Eliza Yamamoto
- Comic Party Revolution - Aya Hasebe
- DN Angel - Riku Harada
- Dragon Ball Z - Princess Snake's Maid (Ep. 14), East City Civilian (Ep. 21), Clamor Walla (Ep. 37), Orphan Walla (Ep. 40) (uncredited) (Funimation dub)
- Girls und Panzer - Maho Nishizumi
- Gravion - Ayaka Shigure
- Kino's Journey - Sica
- Maburaho - Rin Kamishiro
- Mezzo DSA - Mao
- Mythical Detective Loki Ragnarok - Ayako Wada
- Najica Blitz Tactics - Shinobu Misato
- Princess Tutu - Lamp Spirit
- Saint Seiya - Shunrei
- Science Ninja Team Gatchaman - Jun the Swan (G-3) (ADV dub)
- Sister Princess - Dream Girl
- Super GALS! - Aya Hoshino
- Those Who Hunt Elves - Fake Mermaid, Nancy, Elven Hunter #3
- UFO Princess Valkyrie - Princess Chorus
