= List of Girls und Panzer episodes =

Volume 1 cover of Girls und Panzer

Girls und Panzer is a 2012 Japanese anime series produced by Actas. The series takes place in a world where girls take up sensha-dō (戦車道; lit. 'the way of the tank') or "tankery" in the English dub, the art of operating tanks, which focuses on a girl named Miho Nishizumi and her friends as they participate in their school's sensha-dō program. The series aired in Japan between October 9, 2012, and December 25, 2012, although due to production delays, the final two episodes were postponed and were replaced with recap episodes. The final two episodes aired in March 2013. Original video animation episodes are included with the Blu-ray/DVD releases. The opening theme is "DreamRiser" by ChouCho whilst the ending theme is "Enter Enter MISSION!" performed by Mai Fuchigami, Ai Kayano, Mami Ozaki, Ikumi Nakagami and Yuka Iguchi. The series is licensed in North America by Sentai Filmworks.

== Episode list ==
No.	Title	Original release date
1	"Tankery, Here It Comes!"; Transliteration: "Sensha-dō, Hajimemasu!" (Japanese: 戦車道、始めます！)	October 9, 2012
Miho Nishizumi begins academic life at Ooarai Girls High School and makes friends with two of her classmates, Saori Takebe and Hana Isuzu. Soon afterwards, Miho is approached by the Student Council about participating in the school's newly-resurrected elective of tankery, the art of operating tanks. Distraught, Miho tells Saori and Hana that she has traumatic memories of doing tankery, and that she only enrolled at Ooarai because she heard that the school did not have a tankery course. After seeing a promotional presentation of tankery, both Saori and Hana express interest in taking it up and try to convince Miho to join them. Miho cannot bring herself to participate, so Saori and Hana decide to forego tankery themselves in favor of Miho's chosen elective. However, Anzu Kadotani, the Student Council president, objects to Miho's choice and threatens to expel her from school despite Saori and Hana's spirited defense of their friend's decision. Realizing how much her friends are doing for her, Miho gives in and decides to take up tankery alongside them despite her reluctance.
2	"Tanks, We Ride Them!"; Transliteration: "Sensha, Norimasu!" (Japanese: 戦車、乗ります！)	October 16, 2012
The Student Council tasks the new tankery members with finding the tanks that were used the last time the school had tankery. Miho, Saori and Hana are joined in their search by a tank fanatic named Yukari Akiyama, and together they manage to find a Panzer 38(t). Several other tanks are eventually found and distributed among the tankery members, with Miho's group assigned a Panzer IV. The newly-formed teams are then tasked with cleaning up their tanks in preparation for the arrival of the tankery instructor the following day. Afterwards, Yukari takes Miho, Saori and Hana to a military store, and the girls bond over dinner at Miho's place. The next morning, Miho encounters a gloomy girl named Mako Reizei and helps her on her way to school. The tankery instructor, Ami Chōno, arrives and suggests they start out with a full-on mock battle, with each team having to learn how to operate their tank by themselves. Soon after the match begins, Miho's team finds themselves the target of two other teams. As they speed across the battlefield trying to escape, they find Mako right in their path.
3	"We're Having a Match!"; Transliteration: "Shiai, Yarimasu!" (Japanese: 試合、やります！)	October 23, 2012
Mako, who is revealed to be a childhood friend of Saori, joins the others in the tank, which soon comes across a narrow suspension bridge that Hana has trouble navigating. After a hit from enemy fire knocks Hana unconscious, Mako takes over as driver and manages to safely navigate to the middle of the bridge. There, they manage to evade enemy fire as Yukari takes out the enemy tanks following Miho's instructions, securing victory for their team. At their victory celebration back at school, the team decides that Miho should be the commander, with the roles of radio operator, gunner, loader and driver respectively assigned to Saori, Hana, Yukari and Mako. After a few days of personalizing their tanks and training, the tankery members are informed that the Student Council has arranged a friendly match against St. Gloriana Girls Academy, with Miho assigned as overall commander for the Ooarai teams.
4	"Commander Does Her Best!"; Transliteration: "Taichō, Ganbarimasu!" (Japanese: 隊長、がんばります！)	October 30, 2012
As the match against St. Gloriana begins, Miho's team acts as a decoy to lure their opponents into an ambush, which fails because of the Ooarai teams' poor marksmanship and inexperience. Surrounded and taking heavy fire, Miho has the remaining Ooarai teams retreat into the downtown area. Using their familiarity with the town layout to stage further ambushes, the Ooarai teams manage to take out most of the St. Gloriana tanks, but eventually succumb to their opponents' superior firepower and armor. On their way home after the battle, the girls encounter Hana's mother, Yuri Isuzu, who does not take the news of her daughter's participation in tankery very well. Upon returning to school, Miho learns that the St. Gloriana commander, Darjeeling, has left her a parting gift, acknowledging her as a worthy opponent. Ooarai then enters the national tankery tournament, drawing Saunders University High School as their first-round opponent.
5	"Veterans of Their Trade: Sherman Corps!"; Transliteration: "Kyōgō Shāman Gundan desu!" (Japanese: 強豪・シャーマン軍団です！)	November 6, 2012
An unpleasant chance meeting with her elder sister Maho Nishizumi and Erika Itsumi, her second-in-command, leaves Miho apprehensive about Ooarai's chances in its upcoming match against Saunders University High School. To give Miho a better chance of coming up with a plan to use against their opponents, Yukari takes the initiative to infiltrate Saunders in disguise, and manages to escape with information on the enemy strategy. As the match begins, the Ooarai teams are quickly put on the defensive by the Saunders forces. Baffled by their opponents' uncanny ability to anticipate their moves, Miho eventually realizes that Saunders is making use of a radio interceptor balloon to eavesdrop on Ooarai's radio communications. Armed with that knowledge, she uses counterintelligence to lay a trap for Saunders, and manages to take out one of their tanks.
5.5	"Let Me Introduce You!"; Transliteration: "Shōkai Shimasu!" (Japanese: 紹介します！)	November 13, 2012
A special recap episode aired between episodes five and six. The episode reveals the names of all the Ooarai girls and some trivia about them. It also gives an overview of their tanks' capabilities.
6	"Our First Battle Comes to a Climax!"; Transliteration: "Ikkaisen, Hakunetsu Shitemasu!" (Japanese: 一回戦、白熱してます！)	November 20, 2012
Miho takes advantage of the radio interceptor balloon once again to lure the bulk of the Saunders forces away from the battlefield, giving the Ooarai teams enough time to find the Saunders flag tank and lure it into an ambush. Upon learning of the unsportsmanlike tactic by her subordinate Alisa of tapping into Ooarai's radio messages, Saunders commander Kay decides to make amends by reducing the number of her active tanks to match those of Ooarai. As the Ooarai teams chase after the Saunders flag tank, their own tanks begin to be taken out by Kay's pursuing forces. Facing imminent defeat, Miho gambles on the risky tactic of having her tank climb atop a ridge, where Hana manages to take out the Saunders flag tank and win the match just before they themselves are taken out. After Kay commends Miho on her victory and takes her leave, Mako learns that her grandmother, Hisako Reizei, has been taken to a hospital. Overhearing this, Maho, who was watching the match, instructs Erika to fly both Mako and Saori to the hospital.
7	"Up Next Is Anzio!"; Transliteration: "Tsugi wa Antsuio desu!" (Japanese: 次はアンツィオです！)	November 27, 2012
Miho, Hana and Yukari join Saori and Mako in visiting Hisako in the hospital, and are relieved to see that she is fine and back to her feisty self. On their way back home, Saori tells Miho how Mako's parents died when she was little and how Hisako raised Mako on her own. Meeting up for lunch the next day, Yukari brings up the previous year's tankery finals match, where Pravda High School broke the nine-year winning streak of Kuromorimine Girls High School because of Miho's decision to abandon her command of the Kuromorimine flag tank in order to rescue some teammates in distress. Realizing that the incident was the cause of Miho's eventual dislike of tankery, Yukari assures Miho that her decision to put the safety of her teammates above winning a match was the right thing to do. As Ooarai prepares for its match against Anzio High School, Miho begins to find herself overwhelmed by her responsibilities. Her friends help her out by dividing Miho's workload among themselves. In the meantime, the other teams search for additional tanks to supplement their forces, and eventually find a Renault B1 Bis, a long-barreled 75mm anti-tank cannon for the Panzer IV, and a Porsche Tiger tank. Although not all their finds can be readied for use in the upcoming match, Ooarai still manages to beat Anzio and move on to the next round.
8	"We're Fighting Pravda!"; Transliteration: "Purauda Sen desu!" (Japanese: プラウダ戦です！)	December 4, 2012 (Note: The episode simulcasted by Crunchyroll in North America was aired without the scene containing the song "Katyusha" due to licensing issues. This scene was restored with an instrumental version of "Korobeiniki" in the Sentai Filmworks release.)
The Public Morals Committee, headed by Midoriko Sono, takes charge of operating the Renault tank and becomes the Mallard Team. Later, Miho is invited by the Student Council to have nabemono with them, though they hesitate to explain their real motive for inviting her. Meanwhile, at the Nishizumi estate, Maho learns that Miho is to be disinherited by their mother, Shiho Nishizumi, after Ooarai's match against Pravda. On the day of the match, Miho, aware that Katyusha, Pravda's overall commander, has the penchant for staging ambushes, proposes a cautious strategy for engaging the Pravda forces. However, Miho is overruled by the rest of the pumped-up Ooarai teams, who unanimously vote to go on the offensive. As the match progresses, early successes cause Ooarai to become overconfident, and they are quickly drawn into a trap. Completely surrounded, Ooarai take refuge in an abandoned church, where they are given three hours to surrender. As Miho and the other tankery members consider surrender, the Student Council reveals that if they lose, the school will be closed down.
9	"Last Ditch Effort!"; Transliteration: "Zettai Zetsumei desu!" (Japanese: 絶体絶命です！)	December 11, 2012
The Student Council explains that the school is to be shut down next year because of a lack of funding, and that they revived tankery to earn the prestige and money needed to keep the school running. Miho decides they need to fight for their school's survival, and sends Yukari, Mako, Midoriko and Erwin to scout the enemy's tank placements in order to formulate a plan. Noticing everyone's morale is low, Miho also encourages everyone to do the embarrassing Anglerfish dance to get motivated. The battle resumes once Pravda's deadline expires, with the Turtle Team quickly taking out two enemy tanks before being taken out by Nonna, Pravda's second-in-command. As the Rabbit and Mallard Teams work to protect the Duck Team flag tank, the Anglerfish and Hippo Teams pursue Pravda's flag tank, using Yukari as a spotter to pinpoint its location. Eventually, Nonna eliminates the Duck Team's protectors, and Ooarai manages to corner their own target. Both flag tanks then appear to be hit simultaneously.
10	"Classmates!"; Transliteration: "Kurasumeito desu!" (Japanese: クラスメイトです！)	December 18, 2012
The Ōarai flag tank manages to survive Pravda's attack, resulting in Ooarai's victory. Preparing for the finals match against Kuromorimine, Miho and the Student Council realize that they require additional tanks to offset Kuromorimine's overwhelming advantage in numbers and firepower. They manage to restore the Porsche Tiger tank, which will be given to Nakajima with the Automotive Club, designated as the Leopon Team. They also find a Type 3 Chi-Nu tank, which will be commanded by Nekota with her online friends, composed as the Anteater Team. Later, Miho and her friends attend a flower-arrangement exhibition that Hana is participating in, where they see Hana being praised by her mother for applying concepts, she learned from tankery into her artistic style. On the day of the finals, Miho is visited by her former opponents from St. Gloriana, Saunders, and Pravda, who all wish her luck. Miho is also approached by one of her former teammates from Kuromorimine, who thanks her for rescuing her during that fateful match. The finals match then begins, with Kuromorimine quickly attacking in full force and the Ooarai flag tank barely surviving thanks to a fluke defense from the Anteater Team.
10.5	"Let Me Introduce You 2!"; Transliteration: "Shōkai Shimasu 2!" (Japanese: 紹介します 2！)	December 25, 2012
A special recap episode aired between episodes ten and eleven.
11	"The Battle Gets Fierce!"; Transliteration: "Gekisen desu!" (Japanese: 激戦です！)	March 18, 2013
Ooarai manages to escape Kuromorimine's ambush by using smokescreens to conceal their movements and take up defensive positions on top of a hill. A fierce battle begins, with Ooarai managing to disable several enemy tanks before taking advantage of a distraction created by the Turtle Team to retreat. On their way to their next destination, however, Ooarai has to ford a wide river. Midway across the river, the Rabbit Team's tank stalls, leaving Miho with the difficult choice of either continuing onward and leaving the Rabbit Team behind, or stopping to help and risk having Kuromorimine catch up to the entire Ooarai team. With the encouragement of her crew, Miho reaches a decision and takes a tow line over to the stricken tank, allowing the other Ooarai tanks to tow the Rabbit Team across. Ooarai then makes its way to an abandoned town, which Miho intends to use to engage Kuromorimine in urban combat. However, they run into Kuromorimine's trump card, the Panzer VIII Maus. Impervious to Ooarai's weapons, the Maus quickly knocks out the Mallard and Hippo Teams as the main Kuromorimine force continues to speed across the countryside towards the town.
12	"The Battle We Can't Back Down From!"; Transliteration: "Ato ni wa Hikenai Tatakai desu!" (Japanese: あとには退けない戦いです！)	March 25, 2013
Ooarai manages to defeat the Maus through a combined team effort, but the Turtle Team's tank is disabled in the process. The remaining Ooarai tanks then disperse in order to split up the main Kuromorimine force as it descends upon the town. In the fierce fighting, Ooarai's tanks are picked off one after another, but they manage to buy the Anglerfish Team enough time to lure the Kuromorimine flag tank commanded by Maho into an enclosed building complex. The Leopon Team then blocks off the complex entrance from the rest of the Kuromorimine forces, allowing Miho to engage Maho in a desperate one-on-one tank duel in which Miho barely emerges victorious, winning the match and the championship for Ooarai. After the battle, Maho and Erika graciously admit defeat to Miho, and Maho is pleased to hear that Miho has finally found her own way of tankery. The Ooarai teams return to their hometown to celebrate their victory, ending with a parade through the streets of the town.

== OVA ==
No.	Title	Original release date	Ref.
1	"Water War!"; Transliteration: "Wōtā Wō!" (Japanese: ウォーター・ウォー！)	December 21, 2012	
The Student Council announces a trip to the beach, and the girls go shopping for swimsuits.
2	"Survival War!"; Transliteration: "Sabaibaru Wō!" (Japanese: サバイバル・ウォー！)	February 22, 2013	
The Ooarai girls go on a camping trip. After setting up tents and going for a swim, Yukari offers her selection of rations with the others, only for everyone to opt for barbecue instead. The freshmen end up burning everything, but the student council manage to salvage the meal. This episode features an homage to the "Spam" sketch from Monty Python's Flying Circus.
3	"School Ship War!"; Transliteration: "Sukūru Shippu Wō!" (Japanese: スクールシップ・ウォー！)	March 22, 2013	
The academy ships are introduced in greater detail. After exploring the heights and deep interiors of their academy ship, such as the navigation and food production sectors, the girls go to a hot spring.
4	"Anglerfish War!"; Transliteration: "Ankō Wō!" (Japanese: アンコウ・ウォー！)	April 24, 2013	
The girls perform the Anglerfish dance in various localities around Ooarai.
5	"Snow War!"; Transliteration: "Sunō Wō!" (Japanese: スノー・ウォー！)	May 28, 2013	
During the battle against Pravda (specifically, episode 9), Yukari and Erwin go on a reconnaissance mission, but are caught in a snowstorm. After riding it out, they take on disguises as Pravda students and speak with the operator of the KV-2 to obtain information about how Pravda has organised their armour.
6	"Banquet War!"; Transliteration: "Enkai Wō!" (Japanese: エンカイ・ウォー！)	June 21, 2013	
The tankery members celebrate their championship victory with a banquet, and hold an impromptu talent contest with performances from each of the teams.

== Home media release ==
=== Japanese ===
BANDAI NAMCO Arts (Japan, Region A)
Volume	Episodes	Regular edition release date	Limited edition release date	Ref.
1	1–2	May 28, 2013	July 24, 2015	
2	3–4	May 28, 2013	July 24, 2015	
3	5–6	June 21, 2013	July 24, 2015	
4	7–8	June 21, 2013	July 24, 2015	
5	9–10	July 26, 2013	July 24, 2015	
6	11–12	July 26, 2013	July 24, 2015	
Box Set	1–13 + OVA	December 21, 2018	N/A	

=== English ===
Sentai Filmworks (USA, Region 1)
Volume	Episodes	Release	Ref.
Complete Collection	1–12	December 3, 2013	
