= Girls und Panzer: This Is the Real Anzio Battle! =

2014 Japanese original video animation

- Theatrical release poster
- Kanji: ガールズ&パンツァー これが本当のアンツィオ戦です！
- Revised Hepburn: Gāruzu ando Pantsā: Kore ga Hontō no Antsio-sen desu!
- Directed by: Tsutomu Mizushima
- Screenplay by: Takaaki Suzuki
- Produced by: Kiyoshi Sugiyama; Yōichi Sekine; Hirotsugu Ogisu; Youhei Hayashi; Shinichi Sugawara
- Starring: Mai Fuchigami; Ai Kayano; Mami Ozaki; Ikumi Nakagami; Yuka Iguchi; Maya Yoshioka; Misato Fukuen; Mikako Takahashi; Kana Ueda
- Cinematography: Yoshihiro Sekiya
- Edited by: Masato Yoshitake
- Music by: Shirō Hamaguchi
- Production company: Actas
- Distributed by: Showgate
- Release date: July 5, 2014
- Running time: 38 minutes
- Country: Japan
- Language: Japanese
- Box office: ¥34 million (US$320,922)

Girls und Panzer: This Is the Real Anzio Battle! (Japanese: ガールズ&パンツァー これが本当のアンツィオ戦です！, Hepburn: Gāruzu ando Pantsā: Kore ga Hontō no Antsio-sen desu!) is a 2014 Japanese original video animation (OVA) directed by Tsutomu Mizushima from a script written by Takaaki Suzuki. Produced by Actas and distributed theatrically by Showgate, the OVA stars Mai Fuchigami, Ai Kayano, Mami Ozaki, Ikumi Nakagami, Yuka Iguchi, Maya Yoshioka, Misato Fukuen, Mikako Takahashi, and Kana Ueda. Set after the seventh episode of Girls und Panzer (2012), the OVA follows the full tank match between Ōarai Girls' Academy and Anzio High School led by Anchovy (Yoshioka).

The production of the OVA was announced in April 2013. The OVA's full title was revealed in November 2013, and was set to be released in theaters aside from its home media release. Misuzhima and Suzuki were revealed as the director and scriptwriter of the OVA in February 2014, respectively.

Girls und Panzer: This Is the Real Anzio Battle was released in Japan on July 5, 2014, simultaneously in theaters and several paid online distribution services. The OVA grossed ¥34 million at the box office and was nominated for an award at Newtype Anime Awards.

== Plot ==
After their victory against Maginot Girls' Academy at the 63rd National High School Sensha-dō Tournament, Commander Anchovy of Anzio High School's Sensha-dō club announces a secret weapon that they will be using against Ōarai Girls' Academy. After Yukari Akiyama infiltrated their school, Ōarai learns the weapon is a P 40 heavy tank. Miho Nishizumi visits the Hippo Team to learn more about the tank and learns that Caesar has a childhood friend at Anzio.

On the day of the quarter-final match, Ōarai's Duck Team goes into reconnaissance and finds Anzio's Semovente and Carro Veloce tanks already positioned ahead of them at the crossroad. Following the Rabbit Team's report on the number of same tanks they found, Ōarai finds a discrepancy with Anzio's number of tanks allowed during the match, learning the tanks their two teams encountered earlier are made out of cardboard and Anzio is trying to encircle them at the crossroad with their mobility.

With Anzio's plan being discovered, Duck Team pursuits the Carro Veloces led by Pepperoni and Rabbit Team flees from Semoventes. Anglerfish, Turtle, and Hippo teams encounter Anchovy's P 40, Anzio's flag tank, and engage in a fight, with Hippo Team fighting a Semovente led by Caesar's friend Carpaccio. Duck Team manages to disable several Carro Veloces, forcing Anchovy to order her remaining tanks to regroup with her. Ōarai corners Anzio, with Anglerfish Team's Panzer IV disabling the P 40 to win the match. After the match, Anzio treats Ōarai with their Italian foods.

In a post-credits scene, Anzio arrives early to watch the tournament's final match between Ōarai and Kuromorimine Girls' Academy, but they end up sleeping through the match after holding a huge party.

== Voice cast ==
Character	Japanese	English
Miho Nishizumi	Mai Fuchigami	Margaret McDonald
Saori Takebe	Ai Kayano	Jessica Calvello
Hana Isuzu	Mami Ozaki	Caitlynn French
Yukari Akiyama	Ikumi Nakagami	Rebekah Stevens
Mako Reizei	Yuka Iguchi	Molly Searcy
Anzu Kadotani	Misato Fukuen	Rozie Curtis
Yuzu Koyama	Mikako Takahashi	Maeghan Avocato
Momo Kawashima	Kana Ueda	Patricia Duran
Anchovy	Maya Yoshioka	Kira Vincent-Davis
Carpaccio	Saori Hayami	Christina Stroup
Pepperoni	Yō Taichi	Christina Kelly
Noriko Isobe	Mika Kikuchi	Chelsea McCurdy
Shinobu Kawanishi	Mari Kirimura	Cynthia Martinez
Akebi Sasaki	Sakura Nakamura	Carli Mosier
Takako Suzuki / Caesar	Eri Sendai	Shannon Emerick
Riko Matsumoto / Erwin	Satomi Moriya	Luci Christian
Kiyomi Sugiyama / Saemonza	Yuka Inoue	Tiffany Terrell
Takeko Nogami / Oryō	Ayuru Ōhashi	Nancy Novotny
Azusa Sawa	Hitomi Takeuchi	Allison Sumrall
Ayumi Yamagō	Nozomi Nakazato	Katelyn Barr
Karina Sakaguchi	Konomi Tada	Monica Rial
Yūki Utsugi	Yuri Yamaoka	Maggie Flecknoe
Aya Ōno	Chuna	Juliet Simmons
Midoriko Sono	Shiori Izawa	Tiffany Grant
Reira Nakajima	Nozomi Yamamoto	Tiffany Grant
Keiko Hoshino	Hisako Kanemoto	Diane Gallagher
Mai Nekota / Nekonyā	Ikumi Hayama	Monica Rial
Ami Chōno	Hekiru Shiina	Shelley Calene-Black
Erika Itsumi	Hitomi Nabatame	Elizabeth Bannor

== Production ==
=== Development ===
At the Heartful Tank Carnival event held in April 2013, the production of an original video animation (OVA) featuring the skipped match between Ōarai Girls' Academy and Anzio High School in the seventh episode of Girls und Panzer (2012) was greenlit. In November 2013, the full title of the OVA was revealed, with new characters Carpaccio and Pepperoni debuting for the first time, and mechanical designer Hajime Katoki was announced to be contributing to its storyboards. Character designs for Anchovy, Carpaccio, and Pepperoni were revealed in February 2014, as well as the tank designs that would be featured in the OVA: P 40, Semovente da 75/18, and Carro Veloce 33.

=== Pre-production ===
In February 2014, Tsutomu Mizushima and Takaaki Suzuki were revealed to be directing and writing the script for the OVA at Actas, respectively, with Reiko Yoshida handling the series composition. In May 2014, Saori Hayami and Yō Taichi were announced to be respectively voicing Carpaccio and Pepperoni in the OVA. In the same month, Anchovy's voice actress Maya Yoshioka, who also voices Taeko Kondō as her original role, revealed that she was selected by sound director Yoshikazu Iwanami when he asked who should voice the character since they had not decided during the recording of the seventh episode.

=== Post-production ===
Masato Yoshitake was revealed as the OVA's editor in February 2014. In May 2014, producer Kiyoshi Sugiyama revealed that the OVA was originally planned to be half-an-hour long but was extended by eight minutes due to the staff's desire to make it "in the same level as the movie" and new music being composed.

== Music ==
Shirō Hamaguchi was revealed to be composing Girls und Panzer: This Is the Real Anzio Battle! in February 2014, after previously doing so for Girls und Panzer (2012). Similar with the anime television series, the OVA uses "Dream Riser" by Choucho and "Enter Enter Mission!" by the voice cast of Anglerfish Team as its opening and ending theme songs, respectively. The OVA's original soundtrack is included in the third drama CD of Girls und Panzer, which was released in Japan on August 6, 2014.

All music is composed by Hamaguchi, except where indicated.

Girls und Panzer: This Is the Real Anzio Battle! OVA Original Soundtrack track listing
No.	Title	Music	Length
1.	"Yukari Akiyama's Anzio School Infiltration Strategy!"		2:12
2.	"This Is the Real Anzio Battle! Medley 1 (Mock Battle - Start of Match)"		3:07
3.	"Le Fiamme Nere"		1:51
4.	"This Is the Real Anzio Battle! Medley 2 (Operation Macaroni - End of Match)"		5:18
5.	"Funiculì, Funiculà"	Luigi Denza	1:31
Total length:			13:59

== Marketing ==
The announcement about the production of Girls und Panzer: This Is the Real Anzio Battle! was included in the teaser footage featuring the upcoming projects of the Girls und Panzer franchise in May 2013. A television advertisement previewing the OVA was released in December 2013. The key visual for the OVA was released in February 2014. The promotional video for the OVA was released in April 2014, which was first shown on the eve of Ōarai Spring Festival Kairaku Festa in Ōarai last month, followed by another one in June.

The OVA's first five minutes began streaming on Bandai Channel, Gyao!, Rakuten ShowTime, and J:COM On Demand on July 2, 2014. The OVA's Blu-ray theatrical limited edition was sold in theaters on its premiere, which includes a bust figure of Anchovy. Promotional partners for the OVA included Namco and the cake specialty store Anishuga.

== Release ==
=== Theatrical and online distribution services ===
Girls und Panzer: This Is the Real Anzio Battle! was released simultaneously in 14 theaters in Japan and on Bandai Channel, PlayStation Video Unlimited, J:COM On Demand, and au Video Pass on July 5, 2014. The OVA was previously scheduled to be released in March 2014 before it was shifted to the July premiere.

=== Home media ===
Girls und Panzer: This Is the Real Anzio Battle! was released on Blu-ray and DVD in Japan on July 25, 2014. They include an episode of Yukari Akiyama's Tank Course special featuring the Italian tanks. The OVA was aired on AT-X on June 21, 2015, on BS11 on December 30, and on Tokyo MX on January 3, 2016. As part of the 10th anniversary of Girls und Panzer, the OVA aired on Animax on October 15, 2022, and on January 1, 2023.

In the United States and Canada, Hidive began streaming the OVA on June 3, 2020, while Sentai Filmworks released it on Blu-ray and DVD combo set on March 21, 2017, and on Blu-ray on January 12, 2021. In the United Kingdom and Ireland, MVM Entertainment released the OVA on Blu-ray and DVD combo set on November 20, 2017.

== Reception ==
=== Box office ===
Girls und Panzer: This Is the Real Anzio Battle! grossed ¥34 million (US$320,922) in Japan. In its opening weekend, the OVA ranked eleventh behind Documentary of AKB48: The Time Has Come (2014).

=== Critical response ===
Ian Wolf of Anime UK News gave Girls und Panzer: This Is the Real Anzio Battle! 6 out of 10, worrying about Anchovy's nickname "Duce" due to its association with Italian dictator Benito Mussolini and criticizing how the OVA was released, particularly by MVM, separately from the six-episode Girls und Panzer OVA. Despite the criticism, he praised the new characters introduced in the OVA, particularly Anchovy whom he described as "a fun, cheerful, confident creation" and Carpaccio who provides "a bit of background knowledge of the minor characters" due to her connection with Caesar.

=== Accolade ===
Girls und Panzer: This Is the Real Anzio Battle! was nominated for Newtype Anime Award for Mecha Design in October 2014.
