= Girls und Panzer: Motto Love Love Sakusen Desu! =

Japanese animated film series by Masami Shimoda

- Theatrical release poster
- Kanji: ガールズ&パンツァー もっとらぶらぶ作戦です！
- Revised Hepburn: Gāruzu ando Pantsā: Motto Rabu Rabu Sakusen Desu!
- Directed by: Masami Shimoda; Takahiko Usui (Note: Credited as series director.)
- Written by: Noboru Kimura (Note: Credited for series composition.)
- Screenplay by: Noboru Kimura
- Based on: Girls und Panzer: Motto Love Love Sakusen Desu! by Maruko Nii
- Starring: Mai Fuchigami; Ai Kayano; Mami Ozaki; Ikumi Nakagami; Yuka Iguchi; Misato Fukuen; Mikako Takahashi; Kana Ueda; Mika Kikuchi; Eri Sendai; Hitomi Takeuchi; Shiori Izawa; Nozomi Yamamoto; Ikumi Hayama; Ayane Sakura; Eri Kitamura; Mai Ishihara; Ayako Kawasumi; Maya Yoshioka; Hisako Kanemoto; Sumire Uesaka; Rie Tanaka; Hitomi Nabatame; Asami Seto; Mamiko Noto; Ayana Taketatsu; Yumi Hara
- Cinematography: Junya Kodama
- Edited by: Masato Yoshitake
- Music by: Shirō Hamaguchi
- Production companies: P.A. Works; Actas
- Distributed by: Showgate
- Release dates: December 26, 2025 (Act 1); January 30, 2026 (Act 2); March 6, 2026 (Act 3); April 10, 2026 (Act 4)
- Running time: Total (4 films): 293 minutes
- Country: Japan
- Language: Japanese
- Box office: Total (3 films): ¥60 million (Note: Total box office gross of Act 2, Act 3, and Act 4.)

Girls und Panzer: Motto Love Love Sakusen Desu! (Note: Japanese: ガールズ&パンツァー もっとらぶらぶ作戦です！, Hepburn: Gāruzu ando Pantsā: Motto Rabu Rabu Sakusen Desu!; lit. 'Girls und Panzer: It's More Love Love Operation!') is a four-part Japanese animated film series based on the manga series of the same name by Maruko Nii. Produced by P.A. Works and Actas, and distributed by Showgate, the film series was directed by Masami Shimoda, with Takahiko Usui serving as the series director, from a script written by Noboru Kimura, who also supervised the series composition. It features the daily lives of Girls und Panzer characters outside of sensha-dō.

A film adaptation of the manga was announced in March 2025, with Shimoda, Usui, and Kimura joining the project. That month, Mai Fuchigami, Ai Kayano, Mami Ozaki, Ikumi Nakagami, and Yuka Iguchi were set to reprise their voice roles from the franchise. The remaining staff and several voice cast were revealed in July 2025.

The first film of Girls und Panzer: Motto Love Love Sakusen Desu! was released in Japan on December 26, 2025, and was followed by the second film on January 30, 2026, the third film on March 6, and the fourth film on April 10. The film series grossed ¥60 million.

== Premise ==
The film depicts the daily lives of students at Ōarai Girls' Academy and other schools, showing both their sensha-dō (tankery) activities and their everyday school lives.

== Voice cast ==
- Mai Fuchigami as Miho Nishizumi
- Ai Kayano as Saori Takebe
- Mami Ozaki as Hana Isuzu
- Ikumi Nakagami as Yukari Akiyama
- Yuka Iguchi as Mako Reizei
- Misato Fukuen as Anzu Kadotani
- Mikako Takahashi as Yuzu Koyama
- Kana Ueda as Momo Kawashima
- Mika Kikuchi as Noriko Isobe
- Eri Sendai as Caesar
- Hitomi Takeuchi as Azusa Sawa
- Shiori Izawa as Midoriko Sono, Moyoko Gotō, and Nozomi Konparu
- Nozomi Yamamoto as Nakajima
- Ikumi Hayama as Nekonyā
- Ayane Sakura as Ogin
- Eri Kitamura as Darjeeling and Tsuchiya
- Mai Ishihara as Orange Pekoe and Suzuki
- Ayako Kawasumi as Kay
- Maya Yoshioka as Anchovy and Taeko Kondō
- Hisako Kanemoto as Katyusha and Hoshino
- Sumire Uesaka as Nonna and Piyotan
- Rie Tanaka as Maho Nishizumi
- Hitomi Nabatame as Erika Itsumi
- Asami Seto as Kinuyo Nishi
- Mamiko Noto as Mika
- Ayana Taketatsu as Alice Shimada
- Yumi Hara as Marie
- Mari Kirimura as Shinobu Kawanishi
- Sakura Nakamura as Akebi Sasaki
- Satomi Moriya as Erwin
- Yuka Inoue as Saemonza
- Ayuru Ōhashi as Oryō
- Nozomi Nakazato as Ayumi Yamagō
- Mikako Komatsu as Saki Maruyama
- Konomi Tada as Karina Sakaguchi
- Yuri Yamaoka as Yūki Utsugi
- Chuna as Aya Ōno
- Masayo Kurata as Momogā and Rukuriri
- Natsumi Takamori as Rum and Rosehip
- Yō Taichi as Murakami and Pepperoni
- Ami Nanase as Cutlass
- Madoka Yonezawa as Flint
- Satomi Akesaka as Assam
- Mariya Ise as Naomi
- Aya Hirano as Alisa
- Saori Hayami as Carpaccio
- Jenya as Klara
- Saki Ogasawara as Nina
- Kanami Satō as Alina

== Production ==
In March 2025, a four-part film series adaptation of Girls und Panzer: Motto Love Love Sakusen Desu!, a spin-off manga series of Girls und Panzer illustrated by Maruko Nii, was revealed to be in the works at P.A. Works and Actas. Masami Shimoda was announced as its director and Takahiko Usui would serve as the series director. Shimoda worked as the unit director and storyboarder for Girls und Panzer and Girls und Panzer das Finale, while Usui worked in Girls und Panzer der Film production advancement. Additional staff members were also announced, including Humikane Shimada and Isao Sugimoto as the original character designers, with Takeshi Nogami cooperating and Sugimoto also designing the characters for animation, and Kōsuke Kawazura, Yuki Akiyama, and Sayo Mizuno as the chief animation directors. That month, Mai Fuchigami, Ai Kayano, Mami Ozaki, Ikumi Nakagami, and Yuka Iguchi were revealed to be reprising their voice roles as Miho Nishizumi, Saori Takebe, Hana Isuzu, Yukari Akiyama, and Mako Reizei, respectively. By May 2025, Maya Yoshioka was set to reprise her voice role as Anchovy, as well as the character designs were released.

In July 2025, the staff working on the film series were revealed, including Motonari Ichikawa as the 3DCG director, Sachiko Harada as the color designer, Daichi Asakura as the art director, Junya Kodama as the director of photography, and Masato Yoshitake as the editor, with Yuko Iwaoka joining Kawazura, Akiyama, and Mizuno as one of the chief animation directors. That month, several voice cast were set to reprise their roles, including Misato Fukuen as Anzu Kadotani, Mikako Takahashi as Yuzu Koyama, Kana Ueda as Momo Kawashima, Mika Kikuchi as Noriko Isobe, Eri Sendai as Caesar, Hitomi Takeuchi as Azusa Sawa, Shiori Izawa as Midoriko Sono, Nozomi Yamamoto as Nakajima, Ikumi Hayama as Nekonyā, Ayane Sakura as Ogin, Eri Kitamura as Darjeeling, Mai Ishihara as Orange Pekoe, Ayako Kawasumi as Kay, Hisako Kanemoto as Katyusha, Sumire Uesaka as Nonna, Rie Tanaka as Maho Nishizumi, Hitomi Nabatame as Erika Itsumi, Asami Seto as Kinuyo Nishi, Mamiko Noto as Mika, Ayana Taketatsu as Alice Shimada, and Yumi Hara as Marie.

The film series was structured in an "omnibus" format containing shuffled chapters from across the manga's 20 volumes instead of tracing the source material. Shimoda revealed that each film had a "jo-ha-kyū rhythm" but stated that at the end of the first film "Erika leaves us with a question mark, but that mystery will be resolved by the time you reach [the fourth film]."

== Music ==
In March 2025, Shirō Hamaguchi was announced to be composing Girls und Panzer: Motto Love Love Sakusen Desu!. In November 2025, ChouCho and Sayaka Sasaki were revealed to be performing the opening theme song of the film series titled "Nonstop Daydream", as well as Fuchigami (voicing as Miho) performing the ending theme song "Oyasuminasai no Tsuzuki Desu!" (おやすみなさいの続きです！; lit. 'The Continuation of Good Night!'). Both songs were released digitally on December 26, 2025. The ending theme song for the seventh episode of Girls und Panzer: Motto Love Love Sakusen Desu! – Act 3, titled "Iie! Motto LOVEdeshou? Can't Stop Tank Love" (いいえ！もっとLOVEでしょう？～Can't Stop Tank Love～), was released on music streaming platforms on March 7, 2026.

== Marketing ==
The teaser visual for Girls und Panzer: Motto Love Love Sakusen Desu! was released in March 2025. A new visual and the trailer for the film series were released in July 2025. Collaborations with the film series were held by Karaoke BanBan and the cinema chain T-Joy.

== Release ==
=== Theatrical ===
The first film in the Girls und Panzer: Motto Love Love Sakusen Desu! series, subtitled Act 1 (第1幕), was released in Japan by Showgate on December 26, 2025. A short anime was played after the screening titled Shin Iemoto, Tōjō Desu! (新家元、登場です！, New School Head, Arrives!), which shows the meeting of Shiho Nishizumi, Chiyo Shimada, and a mysterious woman wearing geta inside the Senshadō Federation building. Act 2 (第2幕) was released on January 30, 2026. Act 3 (第3幕) was released on March 6, 2026. A new short anime was played after the screening titled Shin Sensha, Hakken Desu! (新戦車、発見です！, Discovery of a New Tank!), which features Yukari Akiyama and other students searching the lower decks of Ōarai Girls' Academy's ship for a new tank. Act 4 (第4幕) was released on April 10, 2026. Following its screening was the release of the pilot anime written by Takuya Miyashita and Yohei Penguin and directed by Morihito Abe titled Girls und Panzer: Princess Samurai, which is based on the manga series Girls und Panzer: Ribon no Musha.

=== Home media ===
Girls und Panzer: Motto Love Love Sakusen Desu! – Act 1 and Shin Iemoto, Tōjō Desu! were released digitally on streaming services in Japan on January 30, 2026, followed by Act 2 on March 6, Act 3 and Shin Sensha, Hakken Desu! on April 10, and Act 4 on May 15. The film series was broadcast in Japan on Tokyo MX, BS NTV, Tulip Television, Shikoku Broadcasting, and Disney Channel beginning October 8, 2026. It will be released on Blu-ray in Japan on January 27, 2027.

== Reception ==
Girls und Panzer: Motto Love Love Sakusen Desu! – Act 2, Act 3, and Act 4 each earned ¥20 million at the Japanese box office.
