= Ray Gigant =

2015 video game

- Developer: Experience
- Publishers: JP: Bandai Namco Entertainment; NA/EU: Acttil
- Director: Motoya Ataka
- Producer: Hajime Chikane
- Engine: Unreal Engine 4
- Platforms: PlayStation Vita; Microsoft Windows
- Release: JP: July 30, 2015; WW: May 3, 2016; Microsoft Windows: WW: August 10, 2016
- Genre: Role-playing
- Mode: Single-player

Ray Gigant (Japanese: レイギガント, Hepburn: Rei Giganto) is a role-playing video game developed by Experience. The game was published in Japan by Bandai Namco Entertainment in 2015, and published digitally in North America, Europe, and Australia by Acttil on May 3, 2016.

== Gameplay ==
The game plays as a dungeon crawler JRPG. Contrary to genre standards, the game will contain no random battles, and a heavier focus on narrative than usual. The game's battles are turn-based and similar to the system found in the game Bravely Default, where the player has a certain allocation of moves that can be made, which can either be saved up into a large number, or used up all at once, leaving the player unable to act for a period. Certain segments in the battles called "Slash Beat Mode" have beat-driven mechanics similar to Rhythm Heaven series of games.

== Story ==
The game takes place in a fictional, future version of Tokyo that has been left in ruins due to the invasion of space aliens called "Gigants". While the entire Earth has been largely laid to waste, before complete destruction, the game's primary character, Ichiya Amakaze, is finally able to defeat a Gigant with a mysterious power called "Yorigami". However, at the same time, the uncontrollable nature of the power also accidentally destroys an entire city, leaving the characters of the game to figure out how to handle this ability". The game is split into three separate chapters, each focusing on a separate protagonist, Ichiya Amakaze, Kyle Griffin, and Nil Phineas. Each protagonist will also team up with two other side characters during their side of the story, Ichiya teaming up with two characters named Mana Isano and Kazuomi Miwa.

== Development ==
The game was first announced in February 2015 in an issue of Famitsu. The game is being developed by Experience, the company that had previously developed the game Demon Gaze and Operation Abyss: New Tokyo Legacy. The game was published by Namco Bandai in Japan on July 30, 2015. In November 2015, video game publisher Acttil announced that they would release the game digitally in North America on the PlayStation Network in early 2016. The English version of the game was made playable at Sony's "PlayStation Experience" event held in December 2015. The game will be compatible with the PlayStation TV as well. The game was released on May 3, 2016 via the PlayStation Store in North America and Europe. A physical PlayStation Vita version release was distributed by Limited Run Games on April 14, 2017.

== Reception and sales ==
Reception

Aggregate score
Aggregator	Score
Metacritic	VITA: 72/100; PC: 55/100

Ray Gigant holds a score of 72/100 at the review aggregator Metacritic, indicating generally positive reviews. The game debuted at number 9 on the Japanese sales charts, selling 8,673 copies in its first week of release. Hardcore Gamer was generally favorable in its assessment of the game, concluding that the game "takes some risks in game design to create a unique JRPG experience. Some of these are executed better than others, but the overall game is solid. It does take about two hours to really show its potential, but the payoff is worthwhile for JRPG fans... the developers were able to combine the influences and create a fresh experience. The storytelling emphasis may seem excessive to some, but it was able to hold this reviewer’s interest..." RPG Site was similar in their assessment; while they praised the game for being "an interesting mesh of dungeon crawling and visual novel elements" while containing unique combat and great presentation, but chided the game for its "repetitive nature" and "lack of challenge". Kotaku specifically praised the game's fluid animations and two-dimensional art style.
