= ÉX-Driver =

Original video animation

- éX-Driver

エクスドライバー (Ekusudoraibā)
- Genre: Racing, Postcyberpunk
- Created by: Kōsuke Fujishima
- Original video animation
- Directed by: Jun Kawagoe
- Produced by: Ken Matsumoto (1-3); Jun Yukawa (4-6); Wataru Tanaka; Tsuyoshi Katagiri (1-3)
- Written by: Shinzo Fujita
- Music by: JAM Project; Hikaru Nanase
- Studio: Actas
- Licensed by: NA: Media Blasters
- Released: 25 July 2000 – 25 September 2001
- Runtime: 24-26 minutes per episode
- Episodes: 6
- Anime film

éX-Driver The Movie
- Directed by: Akira Nishimori; Tetsuya Watanabe (assistant)
- Produced by: Jun Yukawa; Wataru Tanaka; Manabu Yamatō
- Written by: Shinzo Fujita; Takeshi Mochizuki
- Music by: Hikaru Nanase
- Studio: Actas
- Licensed by: NA: Geneon
- Released: 20 April 2002
- Runtime: 62 minutes
- Original video animation

éX-Driver: Danger Zone
- Directed by: Shinichi Watanabe
- Produced by: Ken Matsumoto; Wataru Tanaka; Manabu Yamatō
- Written by: Kazuhiro Satō
- Music by: Hikaru Nanase
- Studio: Actas
- Licensed by: NA: Geneon
- Released: 20 April 2002
- Runtime: 27 minutes
- icon

éX-Driver (Japanese: エクスドライバー, Hepburn: Ekusudoraibā) is a Japanese original video animation series planned, drafted and designed by Kōsuke Fujishima. It is produced by Bandai Visual, Dentsu, Genco, Faith and Actas. The anime series spanned 6 episodes as well as a feature movie, titled éX-Driver: The Movie. The complete anime series, including the movie, were broadcast by Animax.

== Overview ==
In the distant future people no longer drive cars themselves, instead relying on AI (artificial intelligence) computers to drive their cars for them. But when these AI systems start losing control and running wild somebody has to stop them. éX-Drivers are the people who are able to operate the older mechanical non-AI dependent cars who chase down the AI cars and stop them.

A good amount of future and near future technology is featured throughout the series, including automated highway systems and A.I. technology. Automated highway systems have been proposed as a solution to the traffic congestion problems.

In the series, anybody, regardless of age, can be an éX-Driver as long as they possess the required skills. For example, one of the main characters is only 13 years old and drives. The premise of the show is that there are éX-Drivers all over the world but the focus is on the team operating in Japan.

Cars used by éX-Drivers are marked with an éX-D decal. Typically an éX-Driver car would be an older mechanical type car and almost always would be rear-wheel drive with the exception of an AWD (4WD) Subaru Impreza WRC since éX-Drivers usually employ techniques such as drifting when bringing down runaway cars, which is much more difficult with front wheel drive (FWD) cars and in an all wheel drive (AWD) car.

== Characters ==
Lorna Endō (遠藤 ローナ, Endō Rōna)
Voiced by: Yōko Asada (Japanese); Philece Sampler (English)
Lisa's éx-Driver partner. She is a good-hearted girl who drives a Lotus Europa. She also tries to keep the team together when Sōichi and Lisa have an initial tense relationship. She maintains a good relationship between them. In relationship to Sōichi, she acts like a sister.
Lisa Sakakino (榊野 理沙, Sakakino Risa)
Voiced by: Miki Nagasawa (Japanese); Lia Sargent (English)
Lorna's éx-Driver partner. She drives a Subaru Impreza WRX in the first episode, but replaced it with a Group 4 specification Lancia Stratos HF afterwards. She has a tense relationship with Sōichi when he is selected to lead the team and also when he beats her in race. However, Lisa accepts him as the series progresses.
Sōichi Sugano (菅野 走一, Sugano Sōichi)
Voiced by: Yumiko Kobayashi (Japanese); Joshua Seth (English)
An extremely talented 12-year-old. He drives a Caterham Super Seven JPE, though he drives a modified Daihatsu Midget II on a racetrack. He soon becomes the team's leader. He initially has a tense relationship with Lisa, but they begin to gain their trust as the series progresses.

== OVA ==
The OVA series consists of 6 episodes which are - except the last two - independent from each other.

1. AI vs RECIPRO
2. On And On
3. No Problem
4. Regulations of Love (éX-Rider)
5. Crossroads
6. The Last Mile

== Movie ==
The éX-Driver anime series was also adapted into an anime movie sequel, entitled éX-Driver The Movie, which follows the adventures of Lisa, Lorna and Souichi as they participate in an international éX-Driver race held in Los Angeles. The movie also consisted of a special prequel to the series, entitled, éX-Driver - Nina & Rei Danger Zone, which served as the prologue for the movie, centering on the adventures of two of the former éX-Drivers, Nina Thunder and Rei Kazama. Three short bonus shorts were also featured with the movie, featuring Lisa, Lorna and Souichi in events set just before where the movie takes off. These bonus shorts are done in comedic style, mainly with camera pans and zooms on still images:

1. Onsen—set in a hot spring
2. Race Queen—set in the éX-Driver Base
3. Airport—set in the Airport on their way to Los Angeles

== Staff ==
- Planning, original creator, original character concept: Kōsuke Fujishima
- Series composition and script: Shinjo Fujita
- éX-Car design: Shunji Murata
- Mecha design: Takeshi Takakura, Hidefumi Kimura (ep.1)
- Music: JAM Project, Hikaru Nanase
- Director: Jun Kawagoe
