= Ōkami Kakushi =

2010 visual novel

- Original visual novel cover

おおかみかくし
- Genre: Adventure. mystery, thriller
- Video game
- Developer: guyzware
- Publisher: Konami Digital Entertainment
- Directed by: Ryukishi07
- Produced by: Shinichi Tasaki
- Designed by: Peach-Pit
- Music by: Kenji Ito
- Genre: Action RPG, Visual novel
- Platform: PlayStation Portable
- Released: JP: August 20, 2009
- Anime television series
- Directed by: Yoshihiro Takamoto; Tōru Kitahata (assistant)
- Produced by: Gō Tanaka; Masasumi Katō; Niyū Ōju; Kozue Kaneniwa; Satoshi Hirata; Shigeaki Komatsu; Takeichirō Aida
- Written by: Touko Machida
- Music by: Takumi Ozawa
- Studio: AIC
- Licensed by: NA: Sentai Filmworks
- Original network: TBS
- Original run: January 7, 2010 – March 25, 2010
- Episodes: 12
- Manga

Ōkami Kakushi: Kokihi no Shō
- Written by: Konami
- Illustrated by: Mirura Yano
- Published by: ASCII Media Works
- Magazine: Dengeki Daioh
- Original run: November 27, 2009 – January 27, 2011
- Volumes: 2
- Manga

Ōkami Kakushi: Keshimurasaki no Shō
- Written by: Konami
- Illustrated by: Kuroko Yabuguchi
- Published by: Kodansha
- Magazine: Monthly Shōnen Rival
- Original run: December 28, 2009 – November 4, 2010
- Volumes: 3
- Light novel

Ōkami Kakushi Miyako Wasure-hen
- Written by: Ryō Masaki
- Illustrated by: Eri Natsume
- Published by: Shogakukan
- Imprint: Gagaga Bunko
- Original run: March 18, 2010 – March 18, 2011
- Volumes: 3
- icon

Ōkami Kakushi (おおかみかくし; literally Wolfed Away) (wordplay on ōkami(wolf) and kamikakushi (spirited away)) is a Japanese visual novel developed by guyzware and published by Konami for the PlayStation Portable, with Ryukishi07 as game director and Peach-Pit as character designers. The game was released on August 20, 2009, in Japan. An anime adaptation produced by AIC began airing in Japan on January 8, 2010, on TBS.

== Plot ==
A 15-year-old boy, Hiroshi Kuzumi, has recently moved into a new town in the mountains. The town is separated into new and old streets by the river, and many mysterious local customs and practices still remain, and the townspeople are unusually friendly towards him. Although Hiroshi is confused but enjoying his new life, one person has kept her distance from him: class committee member Nemuru Kushinada. In their few encounters, she gives him a word of advice: "Stay away from the old streets."

As the story goes on, Hiroshi learns about the town's local traditions and legends—most prominently the ones about the local Wolf Spirits. However, something mysterious is going on in the background; people mysteriously "move away" and students suddenly "transfer schools" while none of the locals pay any attention. Hiroshi initially tries to ignore it, but he soon sees a girl with an enormous scythe along with people in strange masks killing someone who is said to have "moved away" the following day. Hiroshi is soon drawn into the dark secrets long hidden by the townsfolk, and uncovers a plot to destroy the town.

== Main characters ==
Hiroshi Kuzumi (九澄 博士, Kuzumi Hiroshi)
Voiced by: Yū Kobayashi
Hiroshi is a 15-year-old boy and is the main character of the story. Originally from Tokyo, his family moved to the city of Jōga due to reasons relating to his father's line of work. The kanji for his name can also be read as "Professor", so many people call him Hakase (Professor) as a nickname. Hiroshi is not fond of this nickname, because it makes people believe that he is smarter than he is. Despite this, he still allows Kaname to call him by it. Hiroshi later learns from Nemuru that all humans (known as "Fallen" as opposed to the Godmen as the Jouga wolves call themselves) emit a trace of a scent (undetectable by humans) that is intoxicating to Jouga wolves but emitted in small enough quantities that most of them can resist it without much difficulty (in high enough concentrations this scent can cause them to succumb to their predatory natures and to attack the Fallen). Hiroshi happens to be a Temptation, one human in 100,000, who emits the scent at such concentrations that resistance is almost impossible.
Nemuru Kushinada (櫛名田 眠, Kushinada Nemuru)
Voiced by: Mariya Ise
Nemuru is 15 years old and the only daughter of the head of the Kushinada clan, the family with the most political power and presence in Jōga. Nemuru, as part of her role as the Hunter, patrols the city at night clad in an elaborate ceremonial outfit and wolf mask and wielding a scythe, hunting for Godmen who have succumbed and started to attack the Fallen, whom she is charged with executing. She is the class president of Hiroshi's class. Nemuru is initially very cold to Hiroshi because she considers him to be a danger. Despite this, she eventually warms towards him, and they become friends.
Isuzu Tsumuhana (摘花 五十鈴, Tsumuhana Isuzu)
Voiced by: Emiri Katō
Isuzu is a 15-year-old girl who lives close to Hiroshi. She is tomboyish and extremely affectionate towards Hiroshi, sometimes to his dismay. She had an older brother named Issei, who attended university before succumbing to his predatory instincts and attacking Hiroshi. He was killed by Nemuru. She herself starts to submit and attack Hiroshi, but manages to stop herself and is spared her brother's fate.
Mana Kuzumi (九澄 マナ, Kuzumi Mana)
Voiced by: Saki Fujita
Mana is Hiroshi's 12-year-old sister. She uses a wheelchair due to a car accident. In spite of this, she strives to be independent and becomes quite annoyed when her brother rushes to her side to help her with the smallest of tasks.
Kaname Asagiri (朝霧 かなめ, Asagiri Kaname)
Voiced by: Mai Fuchigami
Kaname is a 16-year-old girl who moved to the Jōga with her family a few months before Hiroshi, and she is Isuzu's best friend. Being the eldest of their circle of friends (Kaname, Hiroshi, and Isuzu), she tends to act as the voice of reason for the group. Kaname has somewhat of a dark personality and does not hesitate to tease or trick her two friends. She is interested in the occult and loves city legends and folklore.
Miyuki Washiu (鷲羽 美幸, Washiu Miyuki)
Voiced by: Katsuyuki Konishi
The eccentric school teacher of Hiroshi's class. He appears to be very popular with his students.
Kaori Mana (真那 香織, Mana Kaori)
Voiced by: Yūko Gotō
A resident of Jouga; she is known in the series for her talent in playing the violin. She's also Mana's music teacher.
Shunichirō Sakaki (賢木 儁一郎, Sakaki Shun'ichirō)
Voiced by: Kouji Yusa
A mysterious young man who has made his life's mission to unravel the mysterious incidents occurring in Jouga. Following the tragic death of his girlfriend Mieko, his ultimate goal is to destroy the entire town (including the citizens who live there) by creating a huge flood; but he is stopped by Hiroshi and Kaori to prevent him from making that mistake.
Issei Tsumuhana (摘花 一誠, Tsumuhana Issei)
Voiced by: Nobuhiko Okamoto
Isuzu's older brother and Hiroshi's next-door neighbor. He's a college student at a private university.
Masaaki Kuzumi (九澄 正明, Kuzumi Masaaki)
Voiced by: Keiji Fujiwara
Hiroshi and Mana's father. After his wife died a few years prior, he and his two children moved to Jouga due to his work transfer; he works for a book publishing company as a writer.
White Wolf Kannon (白狼観音, Hakurō Kannon)
She is a local deity who prowls Jōga, carrying out the god of the land's will to rid it of the regressed "wolves". She appears as a young girl wearing an elaborate white outfit and wolf-like mask. She is named after the bodhisattva Kannon.

== Adaptations ==
=== Internet radio show ===
An Internet radio show entitled JTTB Jōga-machi Kankō Kyōkai Hōsō (JTTB 嫦娥町観光協会放送) to promote the anime series started broadcasting on the Animate TV Internet radio service on December 18, 2009, and airs weekly on Fridays. The show is hosted by Yū Kobayashi and Yūko Gotō, who voice Hiroshi Kuzumi and Kaori Mana in the series, respectively.

=== Manga ===
A manga adaptation illustrated by Mirura Yano titled Ōkami Kakushi: Kokihi no Shō (おおかみかくし〜深緋の章〜) began serialization in the February 2010 issue of ASCII Media Works' Dengeki Daioh shōnen manga magazine and was collected in two volumes. A second manga adaptation illustrated by Kuroko Yabuguchi titled Ōkami Kakushi: Keshimurasaki no Shō (おおかみかくし〜滅紫の章〜) began serialization in the February 2010 issue of Kodansha's Monthly Shōnen Rival manga magazine and was collected in three volumes.

=== Anime ===
An anime television series adaptation produced by AIC and directed by Yoshihiro Takamoto began airing in Japan on January 8, 2010, on the TBS television network. The opening theme "Toki no Mukō Maboroshi no Sora" (時の向こう 幻の空; "Across Time, Sky of Illusions") is by FictionJunction and the ending theme "Tsukishirube" (月導; "Moon Guide") "Tsukishirube" (月導; "Moon Guide") is by Yuuka Nanri. Takumi Ozawa is responsible for the soundtrack.
