= Tsutomu Mizushima =

Japanese anime director and sound director (born 1965)

- 水島 努
- Born: December 6, 1965 (age 60); Chitose, Hokkaido, Japan
- Other name: Mizudori Mangetsu (水鳥 満月)
- Education: Nagano Prefectural Matsumoto Misuzugaoka High School
- Occupations: Anime director, sound director
- Years active: 1986 - present
- Awards: Individual Award (18th Animation Kobe)
- Website: blog.goo.ne.jp/mizshima1941

Tsutomu Mizushima (水島 努, Mizushima Tsutomu; born December 6, 1965) is a Japanese anime director and sound director.

== Career ==
Mizushima was born in Chitose, Hokkaido and raised in Hata, Nagano (now Matsumoto, Nagano). He produced independent films in high school. When he graduated from Nagano Prefectural Matsumoto Misuzugaoka High School, he wanted to be a music teacher, but gave up on higher education due to being out of work. He got a job at Shin-Ei Animation in 1986. His initial aspirations later led him to write lyrics and music. His first animation works were Doraemon and Keshiki Cutter, where he served as a production assistant. After working on Mami the Psychic and Chimpui, he was in charge of episode direction for the first time in 1991 with episode 120 of Oishinbo. According to him, because of his selfishness in Oishinbo, he fell into company-internal unemployment. After being demoted to production assistance, he was in charge of Dorami-chan: Hello, Dynosis Kids!! before being hired by then-director Mitsuru Hongo as assistant unit director for the 1994 film Crayon Shin-chan: The Hidden Treasure of the Buri Buri Kingdom, despite the objections of others. As a result, he participated in the Crayon Shin-chan TV series in that same year. The first time he was involved in scriptwriting was for the TV special Sekizō no Ongaeshi da zo, which aired on December 25, 1998, and also served as its storyboard artist and unit director.

He made his directorial debut in 1999 with the film Crayon Shin-chan: Explosion! The Hot Spring's Feel Good Final Battle, while the first TV series he directed was 2001's Haré+Guu. He has also assisted Takashi Ikehata with his works under the pseudonym Mizudori Mangetsu (水鳥 満月). He left Shin-Ei Animation on August 20, 2004, and since then has been working as a freelance director for J.C.Staff, P.A. Works, and Production I.G, among others.

In December 2013, he won the Individual Award at the 18th Animation Kobe Awards. The award was given for his original work Girls und Panzer, which various media outlets described as an example of "town revitalization through anime", and his versatility in creating a wide range of projects, from gag anime to serious works and adolescent dramas, as well as writing lyrics and music himself.

Since 2010, he successfully produced a wide range of original anime in a wide variety of genres, as well as two original hits, Girls und Panzer and Shirobako. According to Kiyoshi Tane, the supervisor of the now defunct magazine Otona Anime, Mizushima was one of the busiest anime directors in Japan in 2015. Tane also said that Mizushima's auteurism lies in a spirit of service that focuses on the customers, which has broken through to a level that no one else can imitate.

In October 2022, Kadokawa announced an original anime television series directed by Mizushima titled Train to the End of the World, which aired from April to June 2024.

== Works (as director) ==
=== Anime television series ===
- Haré+Guu
- xxxHOLiC
- Kujibiki Unbalance
- xxxHolic: Kei
- Kemeko Deluxe!
- Big Windup!
- Squid Girl
- You're Being Summoned, Azazel
- Blood-C
- Another
- Joshiraku
- Girls und Panzer
- Genshiken Nidaime
- Witch Craft Works
- Shirobako
- Prison School
- The Lost Village
- The Magnificent Kotobuki
- Train to the End of the World

=== OVA ===
- Bludgeoning Angel Dokuro-chan
- Girls und Panzer: This Is the Real Anzio Battle!
- Magical Witch Punie-chan
- Mudazumo Naki Kaikaku
- +Tic Elder Sister
- Another

=== Film ===
- Girls und Panzer der Film (2015)
- Girls und Panzer das Finale (2017–present)
- Shirobako: The Movie (2020)
- The Magnificent Kotobuki Complete Edition (2020)
