= Kowarekake no Orgel =

2009 anime directed by Keiichiro Kawaguchi

- Cover of the DVD and Blu-ray release

こわれかけのオルゴール
- Genre: Drama
- Original video animation
- Directed by: Keiichiro Kawaguchi
- Produced by: Monyu
- Written by: Shinichi Shinozume
- Music by: kiyoma (GCF)
- Studio: ElectromagneticWave
- Released: December 31, 2009
- Runtime: 28 minutes
- Anime film
- Directed by: Keiichiro Kawaguchi
- Produced by: Ken'ichi Hirai; Osamu Fukunaga; Shunpei Maruyama
- Written by: Shinichi Shinozume
- Music by: kiyoma (GCF)
- Studio: Actas
- Released: September 11, 2010
- Runtime: 34 minutes
- icon

Kowarekake no Orgel (Note: Orugoru (オルゴール) is a Japanese loan word for "music box" derived from the German/Dutch word "orgel", which instead refers to the organ musical instrument.) (Japanese: こわれかけのオルゴール, Hepburn: Kowarekake no Orugōru; trans. Half-Broken Music Box) is a one-episode Japanese dōjin anime original video animation produced by ElectromagneticWave and directed by Keiichiro Kawaguchi. It originally debuted on December 28, 2008, in the Comic Market 75 dōjin convention. The official DVD version first released on December 31, 2009, in a limited first edition and special limited edition. The OVA was adapted into a 34-minute film by Actas, released on September 9, 2010, which uses the original cast. The movie also includes a 7-minute, 30 second side story not present in the original anime.

== Plot ==
Kowarekake no Orgel begins in medias res with a look at the two main characters, Keiichirō and Flower, sitting in a van in the rain. It then flashes back to the beginning, showing Keiichirō taking shelter from the rain near a trash heap next to which a small girl is sitting in a chair with a sunflower, unconscious. After second thoughts he decides to pick her up and takes her to a technical specialist. The scene reveals that the girl is an older model of a popular line of service androids, called Parents, who is broken. Because she is an older model, the specialist says she cannot be fixed, and provides Keiichirō with the necessary sticker to dispose of her. Keiichirō leaves her among some junk in his house before going to sleep, intending to throw her out the following day.

During the night, the girl begins functioning and finds herself in a strange house with no memory of the past. When Keiichirō comes downstairs the following morning, he finds her preparing breakfast. He names her Flower after the sunflower she was holding when he found her. It is revealed that evening, when Flower prepares the same meal for dinner as she had for breakfast, that Flower suffers from short-term memory loss, so Keiichirō buys her a diary which is used as the primary means of narration in the OVA. Over the next several weeks Keiichirō begins to teach her about the world, and more indirectly about himself and his troubled past.

== Characters ==
Keiichirō (敬一郎)
Voiced by: Tetsuya Kakihara
Keiichirō is a young Japanese male who lives by himself. He used to play guitar in a band, but stopped after his family was killed in a car accident while driving to one of his live performances. He is religious and prays for his family regularly. Although he is kind and not antisocial, he generally keeps to himself and reflects on the past. Thanks to Flower, he attempts to pick up the guitar a few times and in the end decided to sing again.
Flower (ふらわー, Furawā)
Voiced by: Masumi Asano
Flower is a Parents (service android) who was left by her previous master and discovered by Keiichirō at the beginning of the OVA. She does not function initially, but begins to work overnight after Keiichirō takes her home. She is energetic and excitable, and she likes to sing despite being tone-deaf. She also suffers from short-term memory loss, leading Keiichirō to buy her a diary. She is very loyal to Keiichirō and wished to stay by him. She later becomes Keiichirō's trigger to "feel", which was what he needed to sing again.

== Production ==
Although Kowarekake no Orgel was self-published, it featured a somewhat notable production cast: it was directed by Keiichiro Kawaguchi, who was also involved in the production of Great Teacher Onizuka and Hayate the Combat Butler, and featured voice acting by professional voice actors Tetsuya Kakihara (Keiichirō) and Masumi Asano (Flower). The OVA also featured a screenplay by Shinichi Inotsume and original character design by POP, which was adapted by Kōhaka Nishio.

== Music ==
The main ending theme, "Kowarekake no Orgel" (こわれかけのオルゴール, sharing the title of the OVA), as well as the image song "Keiichirō no Omoi" (敬一郎の思い) are performed by Japanese singer-songwriter Hiromi Satō, and composed by Tsukasa (of Sound Online).

== See also ==
- Chobits
- Video Girl Ai
- Plastic Memories
