= Ikumi Nakagami =

Japanese voice actress and singer

- 中上 育実
- Born: 18 June 1983 (age 43)
- Occupation: Voice actress
- Years active: 2009–present
- Employer: Aksent
- Notable work: Girls und Panzer as Yukari Akiyama; Futari wa Milky Holmes as Keiko Totsugawa/Pink Lovely Doom; BanG Dream! as Maya Yamato
- Children: 3

Ikumi Nakagami (Japanese: 中上 育実, Hepburn: Nakagami Ikumi; born 18 June 1983) is a Japanese voice actress from Tokyo, affiliated with Aksent. She is known for starring as Yukari Akiyama in Girls und Panzer, Keiko Totsugawa/Pink Lovely Doom in Futari wa Milky Holmes, Io Mizusawa in White Album 2, and Maya Yamato in BanG Dream!.

== Biography ==
Ikumi Nakagami, a native of Tokyo, was born on 18 June. Before aspiring to be a voice actor, she aspired to be a girls' manga artist. She was educated at Tokyo Announcement Academy, and later at Aksent's training school Shine, where she was part of the seventh graduating class, before eventually joining Aksent.

In 2012, Nakagami was announced as the voice of Yukari Akiyama, a main character in Girls und Panzer. In November 2014, she was the announcer for a television spot for the American war film Fury as her Yukari Akiyama character. She also performed character songs for the franchise, particularly "1PLDK" and "Senshadō Koiuta!". She also appeared as Keiko Totsugawa/Pink Lovely Doom in Futari wa Milky Holmes, Io Mizusawa in White Album 2, Alice Mifune in Operation Abyss: New Tokyo Legacy, and Redonī Shifiasu in Ray Gigant.

in 2017, Nakagami joined Bushiroad's BanG Dream! franchise as the voice of Maya Yamato, the drummer of the Pastel Palettes in-universe band. She voiced the character in Pastel Palettes' anime spin-off Pastel Life and in the second and third seasons of the franchise's anime television series. She has also voiced the character in the franchise's game BanG Dream! Girls Band Party!, the chibi short anime spinoff BanG Dream! Girls Band Party! Pico, and in the animated concert film spin-off Film Live.

Nakagami married an office employee in the early-2010s, and she initially planned to have a child, but she prioritized work after being cast as Yukari Akiyama. In 2015, she became pregnant with her first child and took a hiatus from work. Her first child, a boy, was born on 19 August 2015. She announced a second son on 4 September 2017. Her third child, a daughter, was announced on 20 July 2022.

Nakagami is a certified first-grade calligrapher.

== Filmography ==
=== Animated television ===
Year	Title	Role	Ref.
2009	Erin	young Nugan	
2010	Super Robot Wars Original Generation: The Inspector		
2011	Maria Holic: Alive	Aoi Hitotsubashi	
2012	Girls und Panzer	Yukari Akiyama	
2012	Smile PreCure!	Yuta Midorikawa	
2012	Tamagotchi! Yume Kira Dream	Yumecantchi	
2013	Futari wa Milky Holmes	Keiko Totsugawa/Pink Lovely Doom	
2013	Red Data Girl	Rena Akinokawa	
2013	White Album 2	Io Mizusawa	
2014	Captain Earth	Rena	
2018–2022	BanG Dream! Girls Band Party! Pico	Maya Yamato	
2018	Pastel Life	Maya Yamato	
2019–2020	BanG Dream!	Maya Yamato	

=== Animated film ===
Year	Title	Role	Ref.
2015	Girls und Panzer der Film	Yukari Akiyama	
2017	Girls und Panzer das Finale: Part 1	Yukari Akiyama	
2019	Girls und Panzer das Finale: Part 2	Yukari Akiyama	
2019	BanG Dream! Film Live	Maya Yamato	
2021	Girls und Panzer das Finale: Part 3	Yukari Akiyama	
2021	BanG Dream! Film Live 2nd Stage	Maya Yamato	
2023	Girls und Panzer das Finale: Part 4	Yukari Akiyama	
2026	Girls und Panzer: Motto Love Love Sakusen Desu!	Yukari Akiyama	

=== Video games ===
Year	Title	Role	Ref.
2014	Freedom Wars	Nina	
2014	Operation Abyss: New Tokyo Legacy	Alice Mifune	
2015	Militärische Mädchen	Tarzei, etc.	
2015	Ray Gigant	Redonī Shifiasu	
2016	The Alchemist Code	Aru	
2016	Monster Hunter Explore	Argo	
2017	BanG Dream! Girls Band Party!	Maya Yamato	
