= Actas =

Japanese animation studio

Actas Inc.
- Logo used since 2019

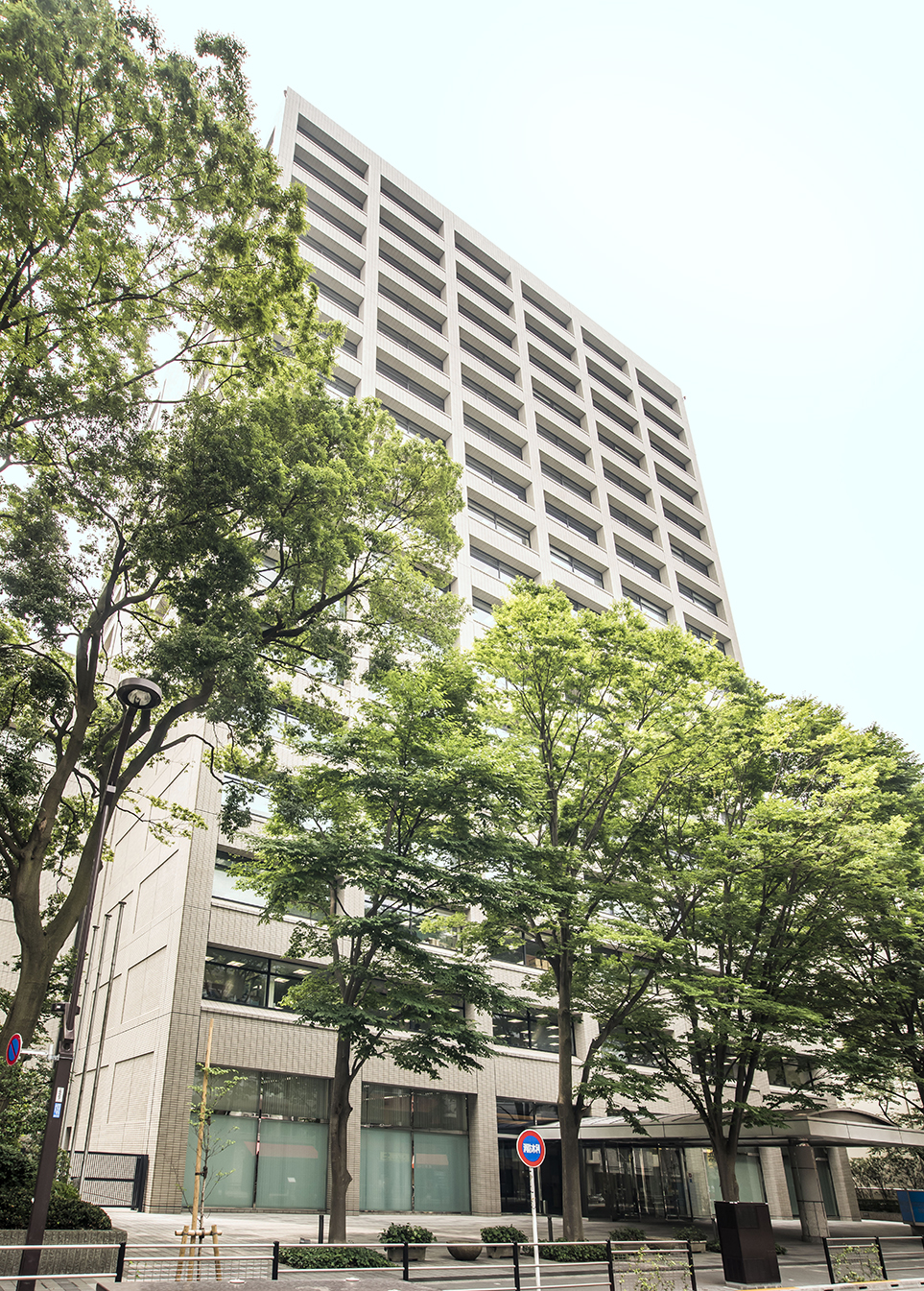
- Headquarters in Suginami, Tokyo
- Native name: 株式会社アクタス
- Romanized name: Kabushiki gaisha Akutasu
- Type: Subsidiary
- Industry: Anime
- Founded: July 6, 1998; 28 years ago
- Founder: Hiroshi Katō; Jūtarō Ōba
- Headquarters: Ogikubo, Suginami, Tokyo, Japan
- Key people: Kenji Hamada (CEO); Board members: Masakazu Yoshimoto; Jun Yukawa; Takanobu Murata
- Number of employees: 59 (as of April 1, 2025)
- Parent: Bandai Visual (2017–2018); Bandai Namco Arts (2018–2022); Bandai Namco Filmworks (2022–present)
- Divisions: Studio Katyusha (Note: Studio Katyusha (STUDIOカチューシャ), the studio's 3DCGI division.)
- Website: actas-inc.co.jp

Actas Inc. (Note: Japanese: 株式会社アクタス, Hepburn: Kabushiki gaisha Akutasu) is a Japanese animation studio founded in 1998. It is currently a subsidiary of Bandai Namco Filmworks, which in turn is a subsidiary to Bandai Namco Holdings.

== History ==
Actas was founded on July 6, 1998, by Hiroshi Katō and Jūtarō Ōba, who previously worked for Tatsunoko Production and Ashi Productions.

Following Katō's death in 2009, Shunpei Maruyama was named the new company president. The studio also had a subsidiary animation studio Karaku, but Actas merged it with the main company in July 2017.

In September 2017, Bandai Visual has announced that it had acquired Actas.

In August 2023, it was announced that former president and animation producer Shunpei Maruyama had died.

== Works ==
=== TV series ===
- 1999–2000: Gozonji! Gekko Kamen-kun
- 2000–2001: Shin Megami Tensei: Devil Children
- 2002–2003: Transformers: Armada
- 2002–2003: Shin Megami Tensei: D-Children – Light & Dark
- 2003–2004: Pluster World (with Brain's Base)
- 2003–2004: Mermaid Melody Pichi Pichi Pitch (with SynergySP)
- 2004: Mermaid Melody Pichi Pichi Pitch Pure (with SynergySP)
- 2004: Transformers: Energon (with Studio A-Cat)
- 2005: Ginban Kaleidoscope; animated by Karaku
- 2006: Tactical Roar
- 2006: Night Head Genesis (with Bee Media)
- 2007: Kotetsushin Jeeg
- 2007: Moetan
- 2007–2008: Mori no Sensha Bonolon
- 2012–2013: Girls und Panzer
- 2013: Da Capo III; credited as Kazami Gakuen Kōshiki Dōga-bu
- 2016: Regalia: The Three Sacred Stars
- 2016–2017: Long Riders!
- 2017: Princess Principal (with 3Hz)
- 2023: Classroom for Heroes
- 2024–present: Wistoria: Wand and Sword (with BN Pictures)

=== OVA/ONAs ===
- 2000–2001: éX-Driver
- 2001–2002: Ajimu - Kaigan Monogatari
- 2002: éX-Driver: Danger Zone
- 2003: Ai Shimai 2: Futari no Kajitsu
- 2004–2006: Tales of Phantasia: The Animation
- 2008: The Idolmaster Live For You!
- 2008–2009: Switch
- 2009–2010: Yutori-chan
- 2010: Mayo Elle Otoko no Ko
- 2011: Mazinkaizer SKL
- 2012–2013: Girls und Panzer
- 2014: Girls und Panzer: This Is the Real Anzio Battle!
- 2015: Cyborg 009 VS Devilman (with Bee Media)

=== Films ===
- 2002: éX-Driver: The Movie
- 2010: Kowarekake no Orgel
- 2015: Girls und Panzer der Film
- 2017–present: Girls und Panzer das Finale
- 2021–present: Princess Principal: Crown Handler
- 2025–2026: Girls und Panzer: Motto Love Love Sakusen Desu! (with P.A. Works)
