= Mai Fuchigami =

Japanese voice actress and singer

- 渕上 舞
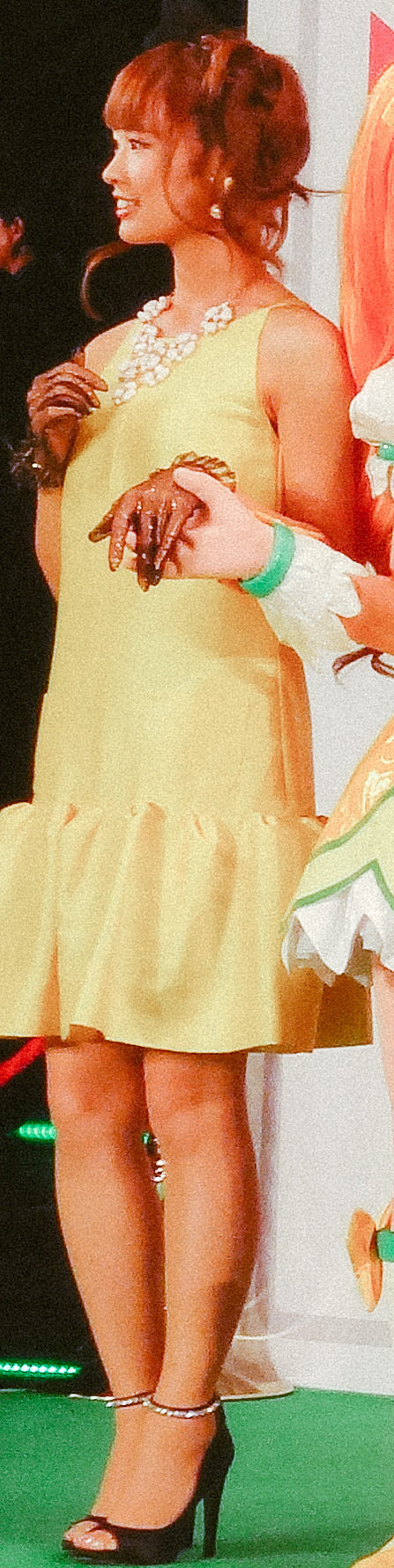
- Fuchigami at 26th Tokyo International Film Festival for Dokidoki! PreCure
- Born: May 28, 1987 (age 39); Fukuoka Prefecture, Japan
- Occupations: Voice actress; singer
- Years active: 2008–present
- Agent(s): m&i
- Children: 1
- Musical career
- Genres: J-pop; anison
- Instrument: Vocals
- Years active: 2018–present
- Label: Lantis

Mai Fuchigami (渕上 舞, Fuchigami Mai; born May 28, 1987) is a Japanese voice actress and singer from Fukuoka Prefecture, affiliated with the talent agency m&i. As a singer, she is signed under record label Lantis. After passing an audition held by the talent agency Sigma Seven, she played her first main role as Kaname Asagiri in the video game Ōkami Kakushi in 2009.

She is known for her roles as Iona/I-401 in Arpeggio of Blue Steel, Alice Yotsuba/Cure Rosetta in DokiDoki! PreCure, Nagisa Shiota in Assassination Classroom, Miho Nishizumi in Girls und Panzer, and Karen Hojo in The Idolmaster Cinderella Girls. Apart from voice acting, she also performed theme song for anime such as Planet With and Ulysses: Jeanne d'Arc and the Alchemist Knight. In 2014, she received the Synergy Award at the 8th Seiyu Awards.

== Biography ==
Fuchigami was inspired to become a voice actress after watching a DVD of Nana Mizuki which was recommended to her by a friend in high school. Although she originally aspired to be an actress or a lawyer, she later decided to be a voice actress. She graduated from the Yoyogi Animation vocational school in 2007. That same year, she passed an audition held by the talent agency Sigma Seven.

In 2009, she made her voice acting debut in the video game Ōkami Kakushi, voicing the character Kaname Asagiri. She would later reprise the role in the game's anime adaptation. That same year, she was given minor roles in various anime. In 2011, she left Sigma Seven and moved to the talent agency INCS toenter.

In 2012, she was cast as Miho Nishizumi in Girls und Panzer, a role which earned her many recognition. She, along with her co-stars, Ai Kayano, Mami Ozaki, Ikumi Nakagami, and Yuka Iguchi, performed the series' ending theme song "Enter Enter MISSION!". The following year, she was cast as Alice Yotsuba in the anime Dokidoki! PreCure. She then played the role of Petralka Anne Eldant III in the anime Outbreak Company which she also performed the ending theme song "Watashi no Hōsekibako" (私の宝石箱). That same year, she was cast as Iona/I-401 in Arpeggio of Blue Steel; she and the other cast members, Manami Numakura, and Hibiku Yamamura performed the series' ending theme songs "Blue Field" (ブルー・フィールド) and "Innocent Blue".

In 2014, she was cast as Karen Hojo in the mobile game The Idolmaster Cinderella Girls. She would later reprise the role in various other media, including the anime adaptation. In January of the same year, she played the character Nagisa Shiota in Assassination Classroom. That same year, she received the Synergy Award for her role in Girls und Panzer at 8th Seiyu Awards. Later that year, she was given the role of Sadayo Kawakami in the video game Persona 5; she also reprise her role in the game's anime adaptation. She then reprise her role as Miho Nishizumi in Girls und Panzer der Film; she also received the Rookie Award for the same role from 25th Japan Movie Critics Awards in 2016.

In 2018, she made her official debut as a singer for Lantis by releasing her first album Fly High Myway!; the album peaked at number 28 on the Oricon weekly charts. That same year, she was cast as Yomi Satsuki in Katana Maidens ~ Toji No Miko, Marie Mizuguchi in Caligula, and Sarasa Ryuō in Ongaku Shoujo. In August of the same year, she released her first single "Rainbow Planet"; the song was used as the ending theme song for the anime Planet With which she also played the character Harumi Kumashiro. The song peaked at number 56 on the Oricon weekly charts.

In 2019, she released her first mini album Journey & My Music; the album peaked at number 28 on the Oricon weekly charts.

== Personal life ==
On May 27, 2024, Fuchigami announced her marriage on Twitter. On February 1, 2025, she gave birth to her first daughter.

== Filmography ==
=== Anime ===
List of voice performances in anime
Year	Title	Role	Notes	Source
2009	A Certain Magical Index	Female student, waitress	Ep. 19, 20	
2009	Umi Monogatari: Anata ga Ite Kureta Koto	Ebi Bijo Senshi, girl	Ep. 9-10, 12	
2009	Kanamemo	Classmate F	Ep. 12	
2009	Sora no Manimani	Mayu, Miyamae, Shouko Shiratori, Yukari Takanashi		
2009	Bleach	Female spirit	Ep. 229	
2009	White Album	Press D		
2009	Miracle Train: Ōedo-sen e Yōkoso	Mai	Ep. 2	
2010	Ōkami Kakushi	Kaname Asagiri		
2010	HeartCatch PreCure!	Student council executive		
2010	A Certain Magical Index II	Agatha, Uragami		
2011	Ground Control to Psychoelectric Girl	Maekawa		
2011	Hontō ni Atta! Reibai-Sensei	Hinako Wakayama, Liz, Maru		
2011	Baka and Test	6th grade male C	Ep. 11	
2012	Nakaimo - My Sister Is Among Them!	Student	Ep. 2	
2012–2013	Girls und Panzer	Miho Nishizumi	Also OVAs and movie	
2013–2014	Dokidoki! PreCure	Alice Yotsuba/Cure Rosetta		
2013	Outbreak Company	Petrarca Ann Erudanto III		
2013	Arpeggio of Blue Steel	Iona/I-401		
2014	Chikasugi Idol Akae-chan	Kikko		
2014	Sakura Trick	Kaede Ikeno		
2014	Jinsei	Shino		
2014	Re: Hamatora	Skill	Ep. 3, 11-12	
2014	Chain Chronicle: Short Animation	Sasha	OVA	
2014	Cross Ange: Rondo of Angel and Dragon	Mei	Ep. 2-8, 10-11, 13, 18, 20, 22-25	
2015–2019	The Idolmaster Cinderella Girls	Karen Hojo	Also season 2 and Theater	
2015–2017	Assassination Classroom	Nagisa Shiota	Also season 2 and Koro Sensei Quest	
2015	Etotama	Meitan		
2015	Hero Company	Hikaru Hyuuga	OVA	
2016	Divine Gate	Undine		
2016–2017	Yu-Gi-Oh! Arc-V	Grace Tyler, Ray Akaba		
2016	Ragnastrike Angels	Hinata Tōjō		
2016	Yo-kai Watch	Uffun Violet	Ep. 116	
2016–2017	Digimon Universe: Appli Monsters	Ai Kashiki		
2017	Idol Incidents	Shizuka Onimaru		
2017	Gabriel DropOut	Machiko	Ep. 2, 6, 8, 12	
2017	Action Heroine Cheer Fruits	Mako Kamisu		
2017	Kino's Journey -the Beautiful World- the Animated Series	Master's Son	Ep. 6	
2018–2019	Katana Maidens ~ Toji No Miko	Yomi Satsuki	Also Mini Toji	
2018–2019	Persona 5: The Animation	Sadayo Kawakami		
2018	Caligula	Marie Mizuguchi		
2018	Ongaku Shōjo	Sarasa Ryuō		
2018	Planet With	Harumi Kumashiro		
2018	A Certain Magical Index III	Uragami		
2018	Hashiri Tsuzukete Yokattatte	Kei Ikoma		
2019	The Magnificent Kotobuki	Camilla	Ep. 10-12	
2019	Kengan Ashura	Shunka Hiyama		
2019	Cardfight!! Vanguard: Shinemon-hen	Esuka Hibino		
2019	Radiant	Ocoho	Season 2	
2019	Gundam Build Divers Re:Rise	May		
2020	Asteroid in Love	Misa Konohata		
2020–2023	Sorcerous Stabber Orphen	Dortin		
2020	GeGeGe no Kitarō	Ma-chan	Ep. 88	
2021	Yashahime: Princess Half-Demon	Fūta		
2021	The Detective Is Already Dead	Fūbi Kase		
2022	Tribe Nine	Saori Arisugawa		
2022	Don't Hurt Me, My Healer!	Anna		
2023	Ao no Orchestra	Kayo Takimoto		
2023	My Unique Skill Makes Me OP Even at Level 1	Erza Monsoon		
2024	Blue Archive The Animation	Yume Kuchinashi	Ep. 9	
2026	The Villainess Is Adored by the Prince of the Neighbor Kingdom	Tiararose		
2026	Magical Explorer	Marino Hanamura		

=== Films ===
List of voice performances in feature films
Year	Title	Role	Notes	Source
2013	Pretty Cure All Stars New Stage 2: Friends of the Heart	Alice Yotsuba/Cure Rosetta		
2013	DokiDoki! PreCure the Movie	Alice Yotsuba/Cure Rosetta		
2014	Pretty Cure All Stars New Stage 3: Eternal Friends	Alice Yotsuba/Cure Rosetta		
2015	Aoki Hagane no Arpeggio: Ars Nova DC	Iona/I-401	Compilation film	
2015	Pretty Cure All Stars: Carnival of Spring♪	Alice Yotsuba/Cure Rosetta		
2015	Aoki Hagane no Arpeggio: Ars Nova Cadenza	Iona/I-401		
2015	Girls und Panzer der Film	Miho Nishizumi		
2016	Pretty Cure All Stars: Singing with Everyone♪ Miraculous Magic!	Alice Yotsuba/Cure Rosetta		
2016	Assassination Classroom The Movie: 365 Days	Nagisa Shiota		
2016	Koro Sensei Quest	Nagisa Shiota		
2017	Girls und Panzer das Finale: Part 1	Miho Nishizumi		
2018	Hugtto! PreCure Futari wa Pretty Cure: All Stars Memories	Alice Yotsuba/Cure Rosetta		
2019	Girls und Panzer das Finale: Part 2	Miho Nishizumi		
2021	Girls und Panzer das Finale: Part 3	Miho Nishizumi		
2023	Girls und Panzer das Finale: Part 4	Miho Nishizumi		
2025	Girls und Panzer: Motto Love Love Sakusen Desu!	Miho Nishizumi		
2026	Assassination Classroom the Movie: Our Time	Nagisa Shiota		

=== Video games ===
List of voice performances in video games
Year	Title	Role	Notes	Source
2009	Ōkami Kakushi	Kaname Asagiri	Debut role	
2011	The Idolmaster Cinderella Girls	Karen Hojo	First appeared in 2014	
2013	Onigokko!	Nazuna	PSP	
2013	Kantai Collection	Iona	Special event	
2014	Tokyo 7th Sisters	Mito Hanyuda, Aguri Higa	iOS, Android	
2014	World of Tanks	Miho Nishizumi	Special event	
2014	Girls und Panzer: Senshadō, Kiwamemasu!	Miho Nishizumi	PS Vita	
2015	Assassination Classroom: Koro-sensei's Great Besiegement!!	Nagisa Shiota	3DS	
2015	Fantasy War Tactics	Chris	iOS, Android	
2015	Cross Ange: Rondo of Angels and Dragons tr.	Mei	PS Vita	
2015	Drift Girls	Saki Aotani	iOS, Android	
2015	Lord of Vermilion Arena	Dux Tia	PC	
2015	Trillion: God of Destruction	Perpell	PS Vita	
2015	The Idolmaster Cinderella Girls: Starlight Stage	Karen Hojo	iOS, Android	
2016	Assassination Classroom: Assassin Training Plan	Nagisa Shiota	3DS	
2016	The Caligula Effect	Marie Mizuguchi	PS Vita	
2016	My Girlfriend is a Mermaid?!	Ion	iOS, Android	
2016	Alternative Girls	Sylvia Ritcher	iOS, Android	
2016	Persona 5	Sadayo Kawakami	PS3, PS4	
2017	The Witch and the Hundred Knight 2	Gabrielle	PS4	
2017	Last Senkan: With Lovely Girls	Missouri, Arc Royale	iOS, Android	
2017	Song of Memories	Fuuka Kamishiro	PS4	
2017	Kirara Fantasia	Ginger	iOS, Android	
2018	Girls und Panzer: Dream Tank Match	Miho Nishizumi	PS4, Switch	
2018	Azur Lane	Admiral Graf Spee	iOS, Android	
2018	Atelier Online: Alchemists of Braceir	Erika	iOS, Android	
2019	47 Heroines	Akira Inoyama	iOS, Android	
2020	Girls' Frontline	Howa Type 89, RPK-16	iOS, Android	
2021	The Caligula Effect 2	Marie Mizuguchi	PS4, Switch	

=== Dubbing roles ===
List of voice dub performances in overseas productions
Title	Role	Voice dub for	Notes	Source
Fury	Emma	Alicia von Rittberg	Film	
Hush	Wendy	Claire Keelan	Film	

== Discography ==
=== Albums ===
==== Studio albums ====
List of albums, with selected chart positions
Title	Album details	Catalogue No.		Oricon	
Title	Album details	Regular edition	Limited edition	Peak position	Weeks charted
Fly High Myway!	Released: January 24, 2018; Label: Lantis; Format: CD, digital download	LACA-15690	—N/a	28	2
HOSHIZORA (星空)	Released: January 27, 2021; Label: Lantis; Format: CD, CD + Blu-ray, digital download	LACA-15857	LACA-35857	60	1

==== Mini albums ====
List of albums, with selected chart positions
Title	Album details	Catalogue No.		Oricon	
Title	Album details	Regular edition	Limited edition	Peak position	Weeks charted
Journey & My Music	Released: January 23, 2019; Label: Lantis; Format: CD, CD + Blu-ray, digital download	LACA-15753	LACA-35753	28	1

=== Singles ===
List of singles, with selected chart positions
Release date	Title	Catalogue No. (Regular edition)	Oricon		Album	Notes
Release date	Title	Catalogue No. (Regular edition)	Peak position	Weeks charted	Album	Notes
August 8, 2018	"Rainbow Planet"	LACM-14787	56	2	HOSHIZORA (星空)	Ending theme song for Planet With
October 24, 2018	"Liberation" (リベラシオン)	LACM-14808	55	2	HOSHIZORA (星空)	Opening theme song for Ulysses: Jeanne d'Arc and the Alchemist Knight
August 28, 2019	"Love Summer!"	LACM-14922	68	1	HOSHIZORA (星空)	—N/a
February 5, 2020	"Yosoku Funou Days" (予測不能Days)	LACM-14964	33	1	HOSHIZORA (星空)	Ending theme song for Sorcerous Stabber Orphen
April 29, 2020	"Crossing Road"	LACM-14996	74	3	HOSHIZORA (星空)	Ending theme song for Shokugeki no Soma: Go no Sara
January 27, 2021	"Marionette coup d'état" (操り人形クーデター)	LACM-24077	53	2	TBA	Ending theme song for Sorcerous Stabber Orphen: Battle of Kimluck
