= Girls und Panzer =

Japanese animated series

- Key visual of the anime television series (counterclockwise from left) featuring: Yukari Akiyama, Saori Takebe, Mako Reizei, Hana Isuzu, and Miho Nishizumi

ガールズ&パンツァー (Gāruzu ando Pantsā)
- Genre: Action, comedy, military
Further information
Manga
Illustrated by	Ryohichi Saitaniya
Published by	Media Factory
English publisher	NA: Seven Seas Entertainment
Magazine	Monthly Comic Flapper
Original run	June 5, 2012 – March 5, 2014
Volumes	4
Manga
Little Army
Illustrated by	Tsuchii
Published by	Media Factory
English publisher	NA: Seven Seas Entertainment
Magazine	Monthly Comic Alive
Original run	June 27, 2012 – January 26, 2013
Volumes	2
Manga
4-koma Panzer Vor!
Illustrated by	Yuuma
Published by	Gakken
Magazine	Megami Magazine; Cho! Animedia (online)
Original run	July 30, 2012 – July 26, 2022
Volumes	1
Anime television series
Directed by	Tsutomu Mizushima
Produced by	Kiyoshi Sugiyama; Yōichi Sekine; Hirotsugu Ogisu; Youhei Hayashi; Takeshi Ishigaki
Written by	Reiko Yoshida
Music by	Shirō Hamaguchi
Studio	Actas
Licensed by	AUS: Hanabee Entertainment; NA: Anime Network, Sentai Filmworks; UK: MVM Entertainment
Original network	Tokyo MX, TV Osaka, TV Aichi, BS11, AT-X
Original run	October 9, 2012 – March 25, 2013
Episodes	12 + 2 recap episodes
Light novel
Written by	Yū Hibiki
Illustrated by	Fumikane Shimada; Shin Kyougoku
Published by	Media Factory
Imprint	MF Bunko J
Original run	November 22, 2012 – June 25, 2013
Volumes	3
Original video animation
Directed by	Tsutomu Mizushima
Produced by	Kiyoshi Sugiyama; Yōichi Sekine; Hirotsugu Ogisu; Youhei Hayashi; Takeshi Ishigaki
Written by	Reiko Yoshida
Music by	Shirō Hamaguchi
Studio	Actas
Licensed by	AUS: Hanabee Entertainment; NA: Sentai Filmworks; UK: MVM Entertainment
Released	December 21, 2012 – June 21, 2013
Runtime	4–16 minutes
Episodes	6
Original video animation
Yukari Akiyama's Tank Course
Produced by	Jun Yukawa; Kiyoshi Sugiyama
Studio	Actas
Released	December 21, 2012 – June 21, 2013
Runtime	5–17 minutes
Episodes	6
Manga
Motto Love Love Sakusen Desu!
Illustrated by	Maruko Nii
Published by	Media Factory
Magazine	Monthly Comic Alive
Original run	May 27, 2013 – present
Volumes	22
Manga
Comic Anthology
Published by	Media Factory
Imprint	MF Comics Flapper Series
Original run	October 23, 2013 – November 22, 2014
Volumes	2
Video game
Master the Tankery!
Developer	Namco Bandai Games
Publisher	Namco Bandai Games
Genre	Action game
Platform	PlayStation Vita
Released	JP: June 26, 2014
Original video animation
Girls und Panzer: This Is the Real Anzio Battle!
Directed by	Tsutomu Mizushima
Produced by	Kiyoshi Sugiyama; Yōichi Sekine; Hirotsugu Ogisu; Youhei Hayashi; Shinichi Sugawara
Music by	Shirō Hamaguchi
Studio	Actas
Released	July 5, 2014
Runtime	38 minutes
Manga
Ribbon Warrior
Illustrated by	Takeshi Nogami; Takaaki Suzuki
Published by	Media Factory
Magazine	Monthly Comic Flapper
Original run	September 5, 2014 – March 5, 2021
Volumes	16
Manga
Comic Anthology Side
Published by	Ichijinsha
Imprint	DNA Media Comics
Original run	November 5, 2014 – present
Volumes	9
Manga
Fierce Fight! It's the Maginot Battle!!
Illustrated by	Ryohichi Saitaniya
Published by	Kadokawa
Magazine	ComicWalker (online)
Original run	November 19, 2014 – August 19, 2015
Volumes	2
Manga
Little Army II
Illustrated by	Tsuchii
Published by	Media Factory
Magazine	Monthly Comic Alive
Original run	April 27, 2015 – March 26, 2016
Volumes	3
Video game
Great Tankery Operation!
Developer	Showgate
Publisher	Mobcast Games
Genre	Simulation game
Platform	Android, iOS, PC
Released	JP: November 11, 2015
Manga
4-koma Comic Anthology
Published by	Media Factory
Imprint	MF Comics Alive Series
Published	November 21, 2015
Volumes	1
Manga
Tankery Recommendation
Illustrated by	Midori Hagi
Published by	Media Factory
Magazine	Monthly Comic Flapper
Original run	August 5, 2016 – June 5, 2019
Volumes	5
Manga
Phase Erika
Illustrated by	Ryohichi Saitaniya
Published by	Kadokawa
Magazine	ComicWalker (online)
Original run	September 19, 2016 – March 19, 2018
Volumes	3
Manga
Daily Life of Girls und Panzer: 4-koma Comic Anthology
Published by	Media Factory
Imprint	MF Comics Alive Series
Original run	March 23, 2017 – February 23, 2019
Volumes	4 + 2 complementaries
Manga
Gekiga
Illustrated by	Motofumi Kobayashi
Published by	Shogakukan
Magazine	Corocoro Aniki
Original run	December 15, 2017 – March 15, 2021
Volumes	1
Video game
Dream Tank Match
Developer	Natsume Atari
Publisher	Bandai Namco Entertainment
Genre	Action game
Platform	PlayStation 4 Nintendo Switch (as Dream Tank Match DX)
Released	PlayStation 4: JP: February 22, 2018; SEA: February 27, 2018; Nintendo Switch: JP/SEA: February 21, 2019
Manga
Saga of Pravda
Illustrated by	Hajime Yoshida
Published by	Kadokawa
Magazine	ComicWalker (online)
Original run	July 19, 2018 – December 19, 2021
Volumes	5
Video game
Gather! Everyone's Tankery!!
Developer	KLab Games; Bandai Namco Entertainment
Publisher	Bandai Namco Entertainment
Genre	Life simulation game
Platform	Android, iOS
Released	JP: August 3, 2018
Manga
The Fir Tree and the Iron-winged Witch
Illustrated by	Michio Murakawa
Published by	Kadokawa
Magazine	ComicWalker (online)
Original run	November 16, 2018 – present
Volumes	2
Manga
Avanti! Anzio Girls' High School
Illustrated by	Bonkara
Published by	Kadokawa
Magazine	Dengeki Twitter Magazine (online)
Original run	February 1, 2019 – June 21, 2021
Volumes	3
Manga
Girls Pandemonium
Illustrated by	Hajime Yoshida
Published by	Media Factory
Imprint	Comic Alive+
Magazine	ComicWalker (online)
Original run	October 7, 2022 – November 2023
Anime films
Girls und Panzer der Film (2015); Girls und Panzer das Finale (2017–present); Girls und Panzer: Motto Love Love Sakusen Desu! (2025–2026)
- icon

Girls und Panzer (Japanese: ガールズ&パンツァー, Hepburn: Gāruzu ando Pantsā; with the part in German translated: "Girls and Tanks"), abbreviated as GuP or Garupan (ガルパン), is a Japanese franchise created by Actas. It depicts a competition between girls' high schools practicing tank warfare as a sport.

The series was directed by Tsutomu Mizushima, written by Reiko Yoshida and produced by Kiyoshi Sugiyama. Takaaki Suzuki, who had earlier acted as a military history advisor for Strike Witches and Upotte!!, was involved in the production of the anime series. It aired in Japan between October and December 2012, with two additional episodes that aired in March 2013 and an original video animation released in July 2014. Nine manga series and a light novel adaptation have been published by Media Factory. An animated film was released in Japanese theaters in November 2015. A six-part theatrical anime series premiered in 2017. A four-part anime film adaptation of the spin-off manga Motto Love Love Sakusen Desu! was released from December 2025 to April 2026.

== Story ==
=== Setting ===
The story takes place in a world where historical World War II tanks are maintained for sport-style warfare competitions and large carrier ships, known as Academy Ships, support mobile sea communities. Of the many activities high school students can participate in, one of the most popular is "sensha-dō" (戦車道; lit. 'the way of the tank'), (Note: The translation of "sensha-dō" differs depending on the source. Official print media published in Japan uses the German compound word "Panzerfahren", while the official English dub by Sentai Filmworks uses the term "tankery".) the art of operating tanks, which is considered a traditional martial art for women.

=== Plot ===
Miho Nishizumi, a girl from a prestigious family of sensha-dō practitioners, transfers to Ōarai Girls High School to get away from sensha-dō due to trauma by a past event, as she presumed the school was no longer practicing the sport. However, shortly after Miho begins her new school life and makes some new friends, the student council announces the revival of sensha-dō at Ōarai and coerces Miho, the only student with prior experience, to join. While reluctant to join at first, having practically been forced, Miho soon warms up to sensha-dō and they enter a national championship, facing off against various other schools, in a competition that becomes a serious matter after Miho and the others learn that their school will be closed should they not win.

The spin-off manga Girls und Panzer: Little Army follows Miho in her elementary school days as she participates in sensha-dō, alongside her friends Emi, Hitomi, and Chihiro.

== Media ==
=== Anime ===
Girls und Panzer aired its first episode in Japan on Tokyo MX on October 9, 2012, TV Osaka and TV Aichi on October 11, BS11 on October 14, and AT-X on October 17, and concluded on March 25, 2013, with 12 episodes. The anime series was produced by Actas and directed by Tsutomu Mizushima from a series composition written by Reiko Yoshida. Shirō Hamaguchi served as the series composer. Choucho performed the opening theme music for the series titled "Dream Riser", while Mai Fuchigami, Ai Kayano, Mami Ozaki, Ikumi Nakagami, and Yuka Iguchi, voicing the five main characters of the series, sang the ending theme music titled "Enter Enter Mission!" An original song to serve as a leitmotif for Ōarai was also composed for the series, titled "Panzer Vor". It was collected into six Blu-ray and DVD volumes that were released in Japan from December 21, 2012, to June 21, 2013. Each volume contains the anime series' original video animation (OVA) and an OVA featuring Yukari Akiyama's lecture about tanks that appear in the series titled Yukari Akiyama's Tank Course (不肖 秋山優花里の戦車道講座, Fushō Akiyama Yukari no Sensha Kōza).

An OVA depicting the unseen match between Ōarai Girls' Academy and Anzio Girls' High School in the seventh episode, titled Girls und Panzer: This Is the Real Anzio Battle! (ガールズ&パンツァー これが本当のアンツィオ戦です！, Gāruzu ando Pantsā: Kore ga Hontō no Antsio-sen Desu!), was released simultaneously in 14 theaters and several online distribution services in Japan on July 5, 2014. Its Blu-ray and DVD were released in Japan on July 25, 2014, which include a new episode of Yukari Akiyama's Tank Course featuring Italian tanks that appear in the OVA. The OVA was aired in Japan on AT-X on June 21, 2015, on BS11 on December 30, and on Tokyo MX on January 3, 2016.

An animated film by Mizushima serving as a sequel to the anime series, titled Girls und Panzer der Film (ガールズ&パンツァー 劇場版, Gāruzu ando Pantsā Gekijōban), premiered in Tokyo on November 20, 2015, and was theatrically released in Japan on November 21. The film was released on Blu-ray and DVD in Japan on May 27, 2016, which include a new OVA, titled Alice War! (アリス・ウォー！, Arisu Wō!), that is set after the events of the film and a new episode of Yukari Akiyama's Tank Course. The film is followed by a six-part animated film series by Mizushima titled Girls und Panzer das Finale (ガールズ&パンツァー 最終章, Gāruzu ando Pantsā Sai Shūshō), with the first film in the series being released in Japan on December 9, 2017. As of September 24, 2024, a total of four films have been released. A compilation film combining the twelve episodes of the series and This Is the Real Anzio Battle! OVA into a two-hour runtime, titled Girls und Panzer: 63rd National High School Senshadō Tournament Compilation (ガールズ&パンツァー 第63回戦車道全国高校生大会 総集編, Gāruzu ando Pantsā Dai 63 Kai Senshadō Zenkoku Kōkōsei Taikai Sōshūhen), was released in 110 theaters and several 4DX and MX4D screenings in Japan on September 29, 2018. The film was released on Blu-ray and DVD in Japan on February 23, 2019.

A four-part anime film adaptation of the spin-off manga Motto Love Love Sakusen Desu! was announced on March 16, 2025. The film series is produced by P.A. Works and Actas and directed by Masami Shimoda, with Takahiko Usui serving as series director, Noboru Kimura handling series composition, and Shirō Hamaguchi returning to compose the music. The first part is set to premiere in Japanese theaters on December 26, 2025, followed by the second part on January 30, 2026, the third part on March 6, 2026, and the fourth part on April 10, 2026.

Sentai Filmworks announced the acquisition of Girls und Panzer in September 2012, and released the 12 episodes of the series on Blu-ray and DVD in North America on December 3, 2013, and the six episodes of its OVA on the same formats on February 25, 2014. Crunchyroll streamed the series in the United States, Canada, the United Kingdom, Ireland, Australia, New Zealand, the Netherlands, Scandinavia, and South Africa from October 10, 2012, to March 31, 2022. A scene in the Japanese broadcast of the eighth episode, where the characters Katyusha and Nonna sing the Soviet folk song "Katyusha", was removed by Crunchyroll, with Jeff Chuang of Japanator stating that "copyright reason is the most likely why the segment was cut". Sentai Filmworks restored the missing scene in their home media release of the series, but the song was replaced with a different one, later revealed as the instrumental version of "Korobeiniki". In October 2012, Anime Network licensed the series for a November release. MVM Entertainment announced the acquisition of the series in October 2013. They released the series on Blu-ray and DVD in the United Kingdom in April 2014 and its OVA on the same formats in June. Hanabee Entertainment licensed Girls und Panzer for an Australian release in November 2013, and released the series and its OVA on Blu-ray and DVD on March 5, 2014. Hidive began streaming the series after the acquisition of the assets from Anime Network in June 2017.

=== Manga ===
A manga adaptation of Girls und Panzer, illustrated by Ryohichi Saitaniya, was serialized by Media Factory in their magazine Monthly Comic Flapper from June 5, 2012, to March 5, 2014. The first volume of the manga was published in Japan on September 21, 2012, and the fourth and final volume on April 23, 2014. Seven Seas Entertainment licensed the manga for English publication in North America in July 2013, with its first volume being released on June 3, 2014, and final volume on June 9, 2015.

Gakken began serializing a 4-panel manga for the series in Megami Magazine on July 30, 2012. Illustrated by Yuuma, the manga later revealed its title as Girls und Panzer: 4-koma Panzer Vor! (ガールズ&パンツァー 4コマでパンツァー・フォー！) and continued publishing on Cho! Animedia website from February 10, 2015, to July 26, 2022, ended due to "production reasons". As of September 28, 2018, the manga has been published in a single volume in Japan. A gekiga manga for the series, titled Girls und Panzer: Gekiga (劇画 ガールズ&パンツァー), was illustrated by Motofumi Kobayashi and serialized by Shogakukan in their magazine Corocoro Aniki from December 15, 2017, to March 15, 2021. It was published in a single volume in Japan on March 26, 2021.

==== Spin-offs ====
A spin-off of the series depicting Miho Nishizumi in her childhood, titled Girls und Panzer: Little Army (ガールズ&パンツァー リトルアーミー, Gāruzu ando Pantsā Ritoru Āmī), was illustrated by Tsuchii and serialized by Media Factory in their magazine Monthly Comic Alive from June 27, 2012, to January 26, 2013. The first volume of the manga was published in Japan on October 23, 2012, and the second and final volume on February 23, 2013. Seven Seas Entertainment acquired the English license of the manga in July 2013, and released in North America its first volume on December 16, 2014, and final volume on March 10, 2015. Its sequel, Girls und Panzer: Little Army II, was serialized in Monthly Comic Alive magazine from April 27, 2015, to March 26, 2016. Three volumes of the manga were published in Japan.

The second spin-off of the series by Maruko Nii, titled Girls und Panzer: Motto Love Love Sakusen Desu! (ガールズ&パンツァー もっとラブラブ作戦です！, Gāruzu ando Pantsā: Motto Rabu Rabu Sakusen Desu!), began serialization by Media Factory in Monthly Comic Alive magazine on May 27, 2013. The first volume was published in Japan on October 23, 2015. As of September 22, 2023, a total of 20 volumes have been published.

A spin-off of the series by Takeshi Nogami and Takaaki Suzuki, titled Girls und Panzer: Ribbon Warrior (ガールズ&パンツァー リボンの武者, Gāruzu ando Pantsā Ribon no Musha), features a new heroine (Shizuka Tsuruki) and was serialized by Media Factory in Monthly Comic Flapper magazine from September 5, 2014, to March 5, 2021. A total of 16 volumes were published in Japan from February 23, 2015, to April 23, 2021. A spin-off of the series by Saitaniya taking place after the practice match of Ōarai Girls' Academy with St. Gloriana Girls' College, titled Girls und Panzer: Fierce Fight! It's the Maginot Battle!! (ガールズ&パンツァー 激闘！マジノ戦ですっ!!, Gāruzu ando Pantsā Gekitou! Maginot-sen Desu!!), was serialized by Kadokawa on their webcomic service ComicWalker from November 19, 2014, to August 19, 2015. A total of two volumes were published in Japan from March 23 to September 23, 2015.

A comedy spin-off illustrated by Midori Hagi, titled Girls und Panzer: Tankery Recommendation (ガールズ&パンツァー 戦車道ノススメ, Gāruzu ando Pantsā Senshadō no Susume), serves as an explanation for the history, development, and technical details of tanks and other vehicles that appear in the series. Media Factory serialized the manga in Monthly Comic Flapper magazine from August 5, 2016, to June 5, 2019. A total of five volumes were published in Japan from February 23, 2017, to June 22, 2019.

A spin-off of the series featuring Erika Itsumi of Kuromorimine Girls' High School, titled Girls und Panzer: Phase Erika (ガールズ&パンツァー フェイズ エリカ, Gāruzu ando Pantsā Pheso Erika), was illustrated by Saitaniya and serialized by Kadokawa on ComicWalker website from September 19, 2016, to March 19, 2018. A total of three volumes were published in Japan from February 23, 2017, to April 23, 2018. A spin-off of the series featuring Katyusha and Nonna of Pravda Girls' High School, titled Girls und Panzer: Saga of Pravda (ガールズ&パンツァー プラウダ戦記, Gāruzu ando Pantsā Purauda Senki), was illustrated by Hajime Yoshida and serialized by Kadokawa on ComicWalker website from July 19, 2018, to December 19, 2021. A total of five volumes were published in Japan from January 23, 2019, to December 22, 2021. A spin-off of the series featuring Noemi Kohiyama of Count High School, titled Girls und Panzer: The Fir Tree and the Iron-winged Witch (ガールズ&パンツァー 樅の木と鉄の羽の魔女, Gāruzu ando Pantsā Momi no Ki to Tetsu no Hane no Majo), began serialization by Kadokawa on ComicWalker website on November 16, 2018. As of July 23, 2022, the manga has been published in two volumes in Japan.

A "gag" spin-off of the series featuring Anzio Girls' High School after the events of Girls und Panzer der Film, titled Girls und Panzer: Avanti! Anzio Girls' High School (ガールズ&パンツァー アバンティ！アンツィオ高校, Gāruzu ando Pantsā Avanti! Anzio Koukou), was serialized by Kadokawa on the official Twitter account of Dengeki Twitter Magazine from February 1, 2019, to June 21, 2021. A total of three volumes were published in Japan from September 27, 2019, to June 25, 2021. A short comedy manga by Yoshida, titled Girls Pandemonium (ガルパンデモニウム), began serialization by Monthly Comic Alive magazine's web label Comic Alive+ on the websites ComicWalker and Niconico Seiga on October 7, 2022, and ended in November 2023.

==== Anthologies ====
Several anthologies based on the series were released in Japan. The first anthology, Girls und Panzer: Comic Anthology (ガールズ&パンツァー コミックアンソロジー), had two volumes published by Media Factory from October 23, 2013, to November 22, 2014. Aki★Eda, EXCEL, Shin Kyogoku, Kobayashi, Saitaniya, Kouhei Takanaga, Shinobu Take, Tsuchii, Maruko Nii, Takeshi Nogami, Hagi, Yasuhiro Makino, Miki Matsuda, Eichi Mudoh, and Takuma Morishige each authored a manga in the first volume, while 15 anime cast joined the writing team for the second volume. The second anthology, Girls und Panzer Comic Anthology Side (ガールズ&パンツァー コミックアンソロジー SIDE), provides "spotlights" to other schools that appear in the series. The first volume featuring St. Gloriana Girls' College was published by Ichijinsha on November 5, 2014. As of January 31, 2020, it has been published in nine volumes. The third anthology, Girls und Panzer: 4-koma Comic Anthology (ガールズ&パンツァー 4コマアンソロジーコミック), was published by Media Factory on November 21, 2015. The fourth anthology, Daily Life of Girls und Panzer: 4-koma Comic Anthology (ガールズ&パンツァーの日常 4コマコミックアンソロジー), had four volumes published by Media Factory from March 23, 2017, to March 23, 2018, with additional release of two complementary volumes featuring animals and foods on February 23, 2019.

=== Light novel ===
A light novel adaptation of Girls und Panzer, written by Yuu Hibiki and illustrated by Fumikane Shimada and Shin Kyougoku, was released by Media Factory in Japan from November 22, 2012, to June 25, 2013. It follows the established story of the series in Saori Takebe's point of view. The light novel was published in three volumes.

=== Games ===
Nijibox developed a mobile-based social game based on Girls und Panzer, which was released in Japan on Mobage, GREE, and Mixi on December 7, 2012, and on Pixiv on January 10, 2013. The game ended its service on April 2, 2015. Namco Bandai Games announced a video game based on the series for PlayStation Vita, titled Girls und Panzer: Master the Tankery! (ガールズ&パンツァー 戦車道、極めます！, Gāruzu ando Pantsā Senshadō, Kiwamemasu!), in November 2013. Developed and published by Namco Bandai Games, the game was released in Japan on June 26, 2014.

A mobile simulation game based on the series, titled Girls und Panzer: Great Tankery Operation! (ガールズ&パンツァー 戦車道大作戦！, Gāruzu ando Pantsā Senshadō Daisakusen!), was developed by Showgate for Android and iOS, and released by Mobcast Games in Japan on November 11, 2015. An illustration book for the game is set to be released in Japan on June 28, 2022. Another video game based on the series for PlayStation 4, titled Girls und Panzer: Dream Tank Match (ガールズ&パンツァードリームタンクマッチ), was announced by Bandai Namco Entertainment in July 2017. Developed by Natsume Atari, the game was released by Bandai Namco Entertainment in Japan on February 22, 2018, and in the Southeast Asia region on February 27. The game was later released on Nintendo Switch under the title Girls und Panzer: Dream Tank Match DX in Japan and Southeast Asia countries on February 21, 2019.

A mobile-based life simulation game jointly developed by KLab Games and Bandai Namco Entertainment for Android and iOS, titled Girls und Panzer: Gather! Everyone's Tankery!! (ガールズ&パンツァー あつまれ！みんなの戦車道!!, Gāruzu ando Pantsā Atsumare! Min'na no Senshadō!!) was released by Bandai Namco Entertainment in Japan on August 3, 2018. The game ended its service on November 27, 2019.

On October 8, 2026, D3 Publisher announced that Girls und Panzer: All-Star Tank Carnival would release for Nintendo Switch 2, PlayStation 5, and Windows on March 25, 2027 in Japan.

On November 13, 2026, Mages announced Girls und Panzer Hakunetsu! Mahjong Tag Battle Desu!, set to release on Nintendo Switch 2 and PlayStation 5 in 2027.

=== Other media ===
A collaborative project between the Girls und Panzer animation team and Belarusian computer game developer Wargaming was unveiled in 2013, aiming to promote the online multiplayer video game World of Tanks in Japan. Part of the collaboration involved the promotion of the game in Japan in the form of advertising and local events, as Wargaming focused to penetrate the Japanese market.

The South-East Asian game server for World of Tanks featured a tutorial documentation in the form of manga, titled Hajimete no Senshado - WoT for Beginners (はじめての戦車道～ WoT for Beginners). Drawn by Midori Hagi, it features Girls und Panzer characters as they learned how to play the game. The manga game tutorial is available in English, Thai, Traditional Chinese, and Japanese; it depicts the five members of Ōarai Girls High's Anglerfish sensha-dō team as they learn how to play World of Tanks, intending to explain the game's basics to new players in an entertaining and interesting manner. The tutorial manga also had a side effect of introducing Girls und Panzer to many World of Tanks players, increasing its popularity amongst the players in the Asian region.

Girls und Panzer-themed mods for the game were announced at the 2013 Tokyo Game Show; these game mods were distributed as free downloads for players in the South-East Asian server, mainly targeting the Japanese-speaking community. Initially, there were six voice packs released, featuring the voices of all five members of the Anglerfish team, as well as a special voice pack for Nonna, the vice captain of Pravda's sensha-dō team; each of the five crew members of the Anglerfish team voices the five different crew positions in World of Tanks: Commander, Gunner, Loader, Radio Operator, and Driver. The voice packs replaces the standard crew voices with the Girls und Panzer character voices, when tank commands such as "Target acquired!" or "Reloading!" sound in the game. The voice packs, however, are only available in Japanese. Afterwards, a garage mod was released, where players could change the regular game garage to the sensha-dō garage square in Ōarai Girls High's Academy Ship. Another mod that was released allowed players to change the skins of a few select tanks in the game to the paint jobs of the tanks in the Girls und Panzer anime. Tanks include the Panzer IV H of Ōarai Girls High, the Churchill VII of St. Gloriana Girls Academy and the Jagdtiger of Kuromorimine Girls High. The last mod that was made available changed the look of destroyed tanks for certain vehicles; instead of a smoking wreck of metal that is shown when a tank is destroyed, the tank is shown in a moderate condition, with a white flag on top, similar to when tanks are knocked out in Girls und Panzer, to indicate that the tank is destroyed.

These mods were later made available together in a mod pack that is free to download on the South-East Asian server of World of Tanks. On 31 January 2016, the World of Tanks South-East Asian server released an updated version of the Girls und Panzer-themed mod pack, in celebration of the release of Girls und Panzer der Film. It features the voices of the Anglerfish sensha-dō team and replaces the standard game garage with the Ōarai Girls High School Tank Garage. It also features a lot of new tank skins, such as the Panzer IV D of Ōarai Girls High, before it was converted into the Ausführung H model, and the T95, M24 Chaffee, and the M26 Pershing of the university's sensha-dō team, in addition to all the previous ones released in earlier mods.

== Reception ==
The initial television airing of the first 10 episodes within 2012 received favourable television ratings and strong viewership. The relatively early airing timeslot of the show allowed the series to gain better exposure to more viewers. Blu-ray sales of the first anime volume in Japan reached third place on the Oricon charts in mid-February 2013, while sales of the second anime volume Blu-ray reached second place in late February with 24,733 copies sold within the first week of release. The third Blu-ray volume met with similar success during March, with 23,528 copies sold within the first week, peaking at third place behind Mobile Suit Gundam Unicorn and Magical Girl Lyrical Nanoha the Movie 2nd A's. The first week sales of the fourth Blu-ray volume reached second place at 28,410 units, behind Evangelion: 3.33 You Can (Not) Redo, which had its debut Blu-ray release the same week. The first week sales of both the fifth and sixth Blu-ray volumes placed first in the weekly Oricon chart, having reached 33,450 units and 32,385 units respectively. The first week sales of the Girls und Panzer: This is the Real Anzio Battle! OVA Blu-ray placed third in the weekly Oricon chart, having reached 35,909 units.

Plastic models of tanks based on those within the anime have topped sales charts in Japan.

An opinion piece published on 22 January 2013 in the China National Defense Newspaper, a subsidiary of the state-owned People's Liberation Army Daily, criticized the anime for promoting "militarist sentiments behind the guise of cute characters."

Famitsu gave the video game adaptation Girls und Panzer: Senshadō, Kiwamemasu! a review score of 23/40. PlayStation LifeStyle gave the game 8/10, highly praising the tank battles for their simplicity and the story for its charm. The game sold 31,526 physical retail copies within the first week of release in Japan.

In 2017, scholar Takayoshi Yamamura described the series as a key example of cooperation between the JSDF and anime productions, noting that the production staff gathered important information with the help of the JGSDF, even riding in a tank at the JGSDF Ordnance School. The show was also helped by the JSDF's Ibaraki Provincial Cooperation Office. However, events which exhibited JSDF tanks drew criticism from the Japanese Communist Party but were supported by the newspaper, Sankei Shinbun. Additionally, Yamamura noted that Ground Staff Office of the Ground Self-Defense Force public relations department praised attendance at such events as demonstrating the "effect of the popularity of battle tanks."

=== Ōarai ===
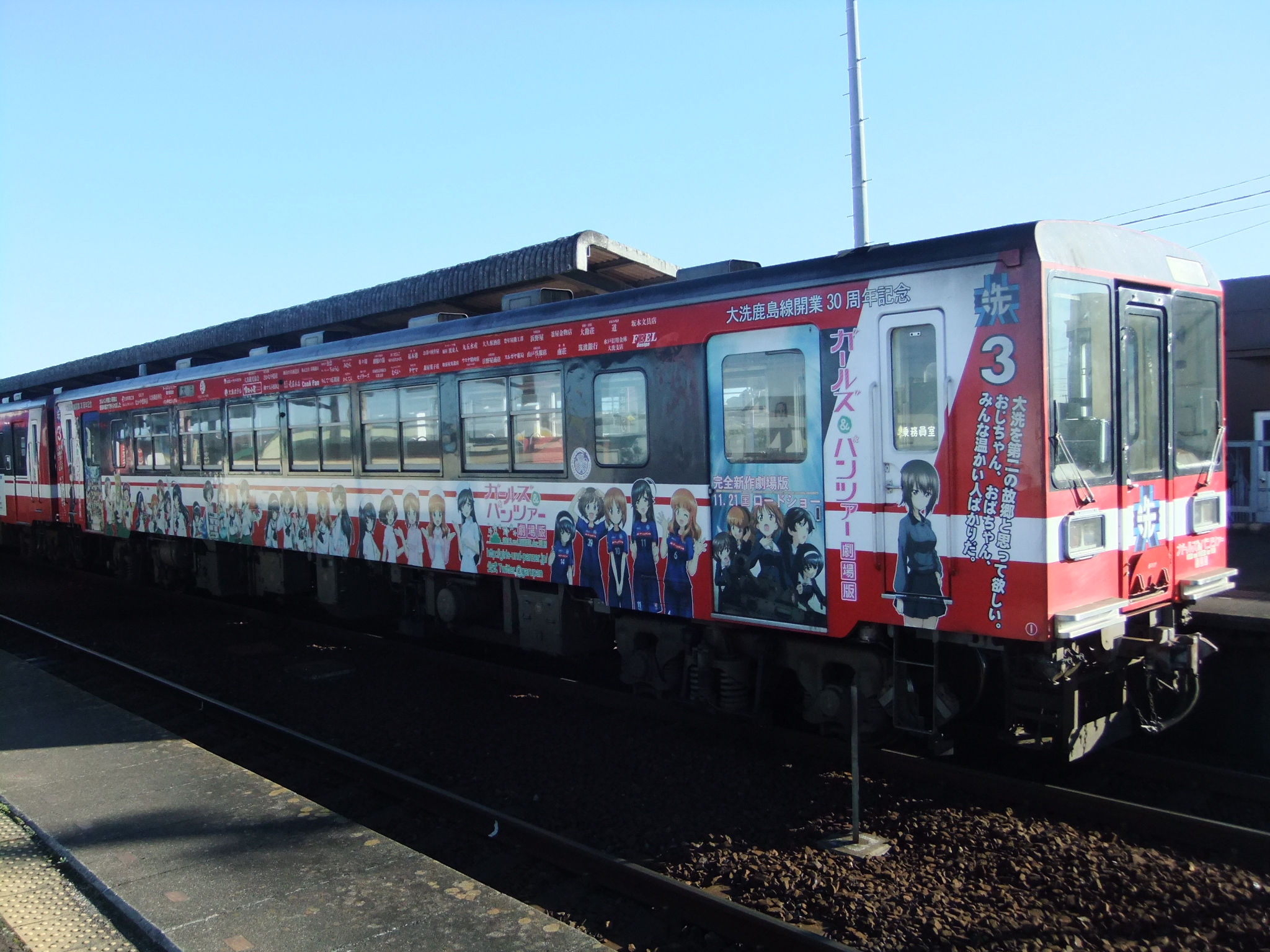
A Girls und Panzer-themed railroad car in Ōarai (2016)

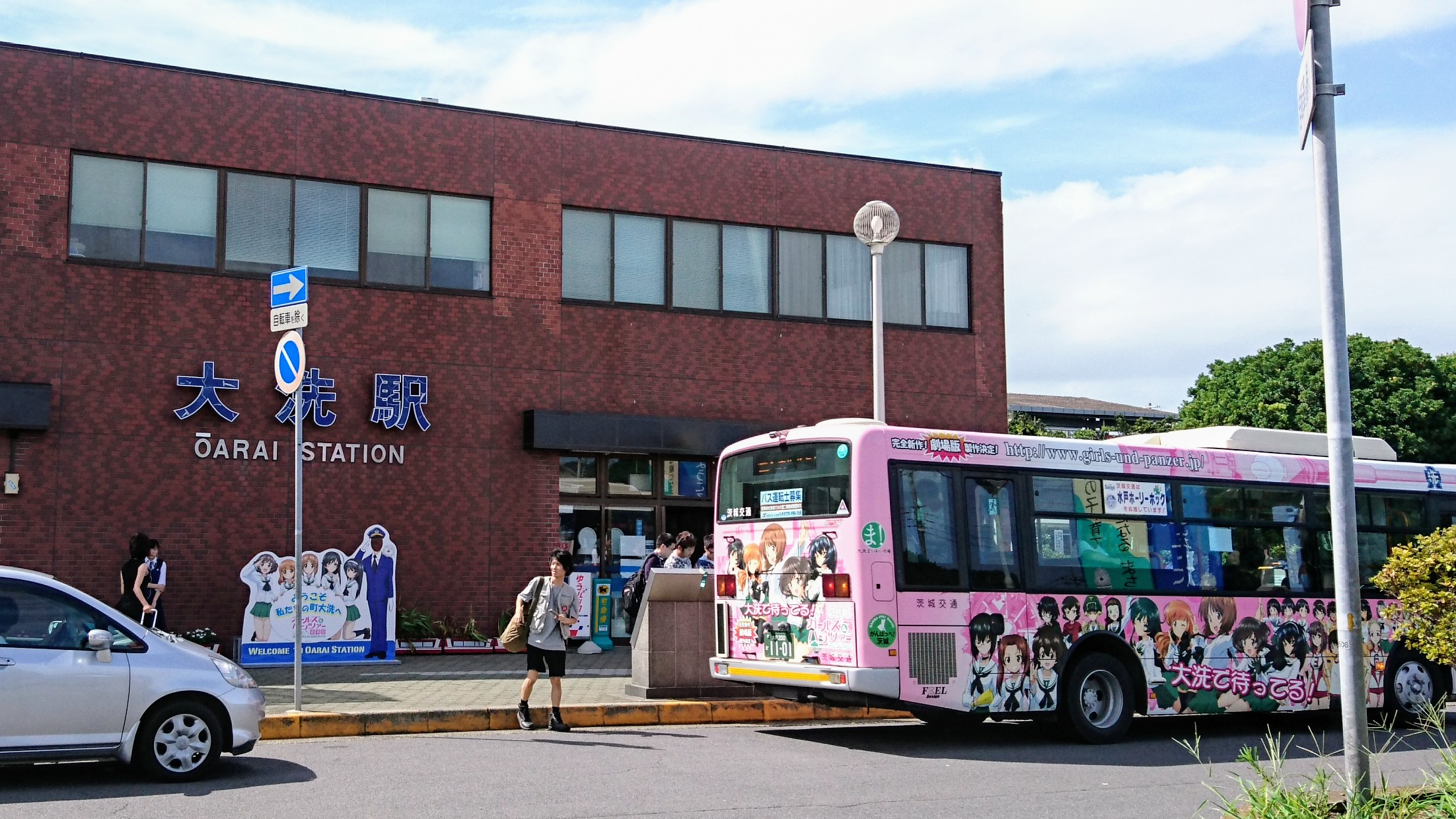
Oarai Station before renovation (2016)

The popularity of Girls und Panzer turned its real-world setting of Ōarai, Ibaraki, into an attraction for fans; fans have paid visits to specific spots mentioned in the anime series, like a canonically-destroyed hotel. In celebration of the popularity of the anime and to promote tourism, local governments and events have collaborated with the series and incorporated it into their themes. The company Oarai Creative Management, for example, won the Japan Tourism Agency's Encouragement Prize for its contributions to boost local tourism. Similarly, the Grand Prize for improving Ibaraki Prefecture's image was awarded to Ōarai's collaboration with the anime. Consequently, the town experienced an economic upturn from selling themed merchandise; between 2015 and 2016, for example, revenues from the town increased 21-fold. Therefore, after the 2011 earthquake and tsunami, tourism helped the town revitalize.

Festivals and events in the town have permanently incorporated themed elements since the anime's release. This includes the yearly spring festival and the local Angler Fish Festival taking place annually every November. The spring festival in 2013 featured live tank demonstrations and the sale of anime-themed merchandise. The Angler Fish Festival, aside from traditional fishing events, put tank replicas and itasha (example pictured) on display, and hosted a talk show in 2013. Official media, such as the 2015 film, were announced during festival period. Originally hosting around 25,000–30,000 attendees, the influx of fans had increased the number to 140,000 in 2019 before it entered hiatus. Due to the COVID-19 pandemic, themed events in the town ceased and were moved to virtual spaces. Thus, a concert was held virtually to commemorate the series' tenth anniversary. The Angler Fish Festival returned in 2023 with cast members attending. "Kairaku Festa", which was held on March 17, 2024, featured a talk show by anime voice actors, an anime quiz competition, and a game to find tanks hidden in the city.
