= Operation Abyss: New Tokyo Legacy =

2014 video game

- Developer: Experience Inc.
- Publishers: JP: MAGES, 5pb.Games; WW: NIS America
- Platforms: PlayStation Vita; Microsoft Windows
- Release: PlayStation Vita: JP: July 24, 2014; EU: June 5, 2015; NA: June 9, 2015; AU: June 11, 2015; Windows; March 27, 2017
- Genres: Role playing game Dungeon crawler

Operation Abyss: New Tokyo Legacy (東京新世録 オペレーションアビス, Tōkyō Shin Seiroku Operēshon'Abisu; "Tokyo New World Record: Operation Abyss") is a dungeon crawler-role playing video game, developed in 2014 by Experience Inc. and published by MAGES and 5pb.Games in Japan and NIS America internationally. The game was released on PlayStation Vita featuring compatibility with PlayStation TV in July 2014 and was released worldwide for Microsoft Windows in March 2017.

== Release ==
During its launch week in Japan, the Vita version sold 15,242 units, placing it 5th on the weekly sales charts. A week later it would ship an additional 4,403 units, making the total amount sold after 2 weeks 19,645.

A limited edition launched alongside the game, exclusively on NIS America's online store. It included a collectible box, art book, and soundtrack CD. Alternatively, launch editions came bundled with a copy of the game's soundtrack.

== Reception ==
Reception

Aggregate score
Aggregator	Score
Metacritic	(Vita) 66/100 (PC) 63/100

Review scores
Publication	Score
Destructoid	(Vita) 7.5/10
Famitsu	(Vita) 30/40
Hardcore Gamer	(Vita) 3.5/5
Jeuxvideo.com	(Vita) 13/20
MeriStation	(Vita) 7/10
Pocket Gamer	(Vita) 3/5
RPGamer	(Vita) 2.5/5
RPGFan	(Vita) 55%
The Digital Fix	(Vita) 6/10

The game received "mixed or average reviews" on both platforms according to the review aggregation website Metacritic. In Japan, Famitsu gave the Vita version a score of one seven, two eights, and one seven for a total of 30 out of 40.

Bradly Halestorm of Hardcore Gamer said of the Vita version: "Operation Abyss: New Tokyo Legacy is a fine DRPG. It has all the facets one would expect from a game of its genre and manages to implement those features effectively." Chris Carter of Destructoid said: "While I probably won't be rushing to complete it again anytime soon, it was a lengthy enough adventure that will stay fresh in my mind for some time."

== Sequel ==
A sequel called "Operation Babel: New Tokyo Legacy" was released in May 2017 on Steam platform.
