= Mami Ozaki =

Japanese voice actress

- 尾崎 真実
- Born: 22 March
- Occupations: Voice actress; singer
- Years active: 2012–present
- Notable work: Girls und Panzer as Hana Isuzu; Super Sonico The Animation as Fuuri Watanuki

Mami Ozaki (Japanese: 尾崎 真実, Hepburn: Ozaki Mami; born 22 March) is a Japanese voice actress and singer from Chiba Prefecture. She is known for starring as Hana Isuzu in Girls und Panzer and Fuuri Watanuki in Super Sonico The Animation.

== Biography ==
Ozaki, a native of Chiba Prefecture, was born on 22 March.

In 2012, she started starring as Hana Isuzu in Girls und Panzer. Her character song single, "Saita Hana", was released on 5 December 2012. She reprised her role in the film sequel Girls und Panzer der Film and Original Video Animation series Girls und Panzer das Finale. She and Mai Fuchigami were invited as part of a franchise collaboration at the 27 September 2015 match between Mito HollyHock and FC Gifu. In March 2024, she returned to the franchise with her appearance at Ōarai Spring Festival Kairaku Festa.

In 2014, she appeared at Kinugawa–Onsen Station as the station's fictional conductor and boarding announcer Miyabi Kinugawa, and she starred as Fuuri Watanuki in Super Sonico The Animation. She also voiced Kasurina in Heybot! and Elena Shiina in Happiness Charge PreCure, as well as minor characters in series like Brave Beats, Durarara!!, and Gintama°. In 2015, she and Ai Shimizu were invited to headline a training exercise and coverage event at JMSDF Tateyama Air Base.

After leaving Power Rise in 2017, she became a freelancer. She was also one of the first voice actors affiliated to Eri Sendai's agency Green Note, before leaving in May 2023.

On 31 December 2020, she announced on Twitter that she had been married.

== Filmography ==
=== Animated television ===
Year	Title	Role(s)	Ref
2012	Girls und Panzer	Hana Isuzu	
2014	Happiness Charge PreCure	Elena Shiina	
2014	Super Sonico The Animation	Fuuri Watanuki	
2014	Witchcraft Works	Laurent	
2015	Brave Beats	Shirai-sensei, Akemi Hoshino	
2015	Durarara!!	Friend's mother	
2016	Gintama°	Hostess	
2016	Heybot!	Kasurina	
2018	Last Period	Mimosa	

=== Animated film ===
Year	Title	Role(s)	Ref
2014	Pretty Cure All Stars New Stage 3: Eternal Friends	Boy	
2015	Girls und Panzer der Film	Hana Izusu	
2021–present	Girls und Panzer das Finale	Hana Izusu	
2026	Girls und Panzer: Motto Love Love Sakusen Desu!	Hana Izusu	

=== Video games ===
Year	Title	Role(s)	Ref
2017	Princess Principal: Game of Mission	Maria Florence	
2017	Quiz RPG: The World of Mystic Wiz	Tula	
