= ChouCho =

Japanese singer

- Born: June 21; Osaka Prefecture, Japan
- Genre: J-pop
- Occupations: Singer, lyricist
- Years active: 2007–present
- Label: Lantis
- Website: iwill-music.co.jp/choucho/

ChouCho (ちょうちょ, Chōcho; lit. "Butterfly", born June 21) is a Japanese singer from Osaka Prefecture and is signed to Lantis.

== Career ==
ChouCho initially formed the band Lotus Lotus in 2007 when still in high school and performed covers of songs from anime. Starting in June 2008, ChouCho began submitting videos of her singing on the Nico Nico Douga video sharing website. On July 27, 2011, she made her major debut with her single "Kawaru Mirai" (カワルミライ; lit. 'Changing Future'), which is used as the opening theme to the 2011 anime Heaven's Memo Pad. Her second single "Authentic symphony" was released on October 26, 2011, and is used as the opening theme to the 2011 anime Mashiroiro Symphony. In August 2011, she released the album Lapis with the producer Junky. ChouCho's third single "Harmonia" (ハルモニア) was released on November 23, 2011, and is used as the ending theme to the 2011 original video animation series The Legend of Heroes: Trails in the Sky. Her fourth single "Million of Bravery" was released on March 21, 2012, and is used as the theme song to the 2012 video game Kaku-San-Sei Million Arthur.

Her fifth single "Yasashisa no Riyū" (優しさの理由; lit. 'Reason of Kindness') was released on May 2, 2012, and is used as the opening theme to the 2012 anime Hyōka. ChouCho released her debut solo album Flyleaf on August 8, 2012, containing all previously released singles. Her sixth single "DreamRiser" was released on October 24, 2012, and is used as opening theme to the 2012 anime Girls und Panzer. Her seventh single "Sora to Kimi no Message" (空とキミのメッセージ; lit. 'Sky and Your Message') was released on May 22, 2013, and is used as the ending theme to the 2013 anime Gargantia on the Verdurous Planet. Her eighth single "Starlog" was released on July 31, 2013, and is used as the opening theme to the 2013 anime Fate/kaleid liner Prisma Illya. ChouCho's second studio album Secretgarden was released on December 25, 2013, containing her sixth through eighth singles.

Her ninth single "Ano Sora ni Kaeru Mirai de" (あの空に還る未来で) was released on February 26, 2014, and is used as the ending theme to the 2014 anime Buddy Complex. Her tenth single "Natsu no Hi to Kimi no Koe" (夏の日と君の声) was released on August 6, 2014, and is used as the opening theme to the 2014 anime Glasslip. Her 11th single "Bless Your Name" was released on April 15, 2015, and is used as the opening theme to the 2015 anime High School DxD BorN. Her 12th single "Piece of Youth" was released on November 25, 2015; the song is used as the theme song to the 2015 anime film Girls und Panzer der Film. ChouCho's 13th single "Kūsō Triangle" (空想トライアングル) was released on February 24, 2016; the song is used as the ending theme to the 2016 anime Haruchika. Her 14th single "Asterism" was released on July 27, 2016; the song is used as the opening theme to the 2016 anime Fate/kaleid liner Prisma Illya 3rei!. ChouCho's 15th single "Elemental World" was released on February 15, 2017; the song is used as the ending theme to the 2017 anime Masamune-kun's Revenge. Her 16th single "Kaleidoscope / Usubeni no Tsuki" (薄紅の月) was released on August 26, 2017. Her 17th single "Ashita no Kimi Sae Ireba Ii." (明日の君さえいればいい。) was released on October 25, 2017; the song is used as the opening theme to the 2017 anime A Sister's All You Need. Her 18th single "Orange Iro" (オレンジ色); the title song is used as the ending theme to the 2018 anime Tsurune.

In 2019 she released the album Naked Garden, which featured acoustic covers of her songs as well as songs by other artists. She released a compilation album titled ChouCho the Best on December 8, 2021.

== Discography ==
=== Albums ===
==== Studio albums ====
| Year | Album details | Peak Oricon chart positions |
|---|---|---|
| 2011 | Lapis (under the name Junky Infinity Chōcho): Released: August 24, 2011; Label: dmARTS (DGSA-10015); Format: CD | 189 |
| 2012 | Flyleaf: Released: August 8, 2012; Label: Lantis (LACA-15224); Format: CD, CD+DVD | 31 |
| 2013 | Secretgarden: Released: December 25, 2013; Label: Lantis (LACA-15366); Format: CD, CD+DVD | 41 |
| 2018 | Color of Time: Released: January 17, 2018; Label: Lantis (LACA-15680); Format: CD, CD+DVD | 42 |

==== Compilation albums ====
| Year | Album details | Peak Oricon chart positions |
|---|---|---|
| 2016 | ChouCho ColleCtion "Bouquet": Released: May 25, 2016; Label: Lantis (LACA-15565); Format: CD | 17 |

==== Mini albums ====
| Year | Album details | Peak Oricon chart positions |
|---|---|---|
| 2011 | Crystal Note: Released: May 1, 2011; Format: Digital | — |
"—" denotes releases that did not chart.

=== Singles ===
| Year | Song | Peak Oricon chart positions | Album |
|---|---|---|---|
| 2011 | "Kawaru Mirai" | 38 | Flyleaf |
| 2011 | "Authentic Symphony" | 29 | Flyleaf |
| 2011 | "Harmonia" | 153 | Flyleaf |
| 2012 | "Million of Bravery" | 93 | Flyleaf |
| 2012 | "Yasashisa no Riyū" | 28 | Flyleaf |
| 2012 | "DreamRiser" | 41 | Secretgarden |
| 2013 | "Sora to Kimi no Message" | 43 | Secretgarden |
| 2013 | "Starlog" | 27 | Secretgarden |
| 2014 | "Ano Sora ni Kaeru Mirai de" | 57 | Bouquet |
| 2014 | "Natsu no Hi to Kimi no Koe" | 57 | Bouquet |
| 2015 | "Bless Your Name" | 49 | Bouquet |
| 2015 | "Piece of Youth" | 30 | Bouquet |
| 2016 | "Kūsō Triangle" | 72 | Bouquet |
| 2016 | "Asterism" | 65 | Color of Time |
| 2017 | "Elemental World" | 67 | Color of Time |
| 2017 | "Kaleidoscope/Usubeni no Tsuki" | 61 | Color of Time |
| 2017 | "Ashita no Kimi Sae Ireba Ii." | 54 | Color of Time |
| 2018 | "Orange Iro" | 156 | |
| 2020 | "Haiiro no Saga" | 41 | |

==== Limited singles ====
| Year | Song | Peak Oricon chart positions |
|---|---|---|
| 2014 | "Whitepetals" | — |
"—" denotes releases that did not chart.

=== Music videos ===
| Year | Song | Director |
|---|---|---|
| 2011 | "Kawaru Mirai" | |
| 2011 | "Authentic Symphony" | |
| 2011 | "Harmonia" | |
| 2012 | "Million of Bravery" | |
| 2012 | "Yasashisa no Riyū" | |
| 2012 | "Flyleaf" | |
| 2012 | "DreamRiser" | |
| 2013 | "Sora to Kimi no Message" | |
| 2013 | "Starlog" | |
| 2013 | "Secretgarden" | |
| 2014 | "Ano Sora ni Kaeru Mirai de" | |
| 2014 | "Natsu no Hi to Kimi no Koe" | |
| 2015 | "Bless Your Name" | |
| 2015 | "Piece of Youth" | |
| 2016 | "Kūsō Triangle" | |
| 2016 | "Asterism" | |
| 2017 | "Elemental World" | |

=== Other album appearances ===
| Year | Song | Album | Notes | Ref. |
|---|---|---|---|---|
| 2010 | "Soul's Refrain" | Chō! Anime Beat | Credited as Jik feat. ChouCho | |
| 2011 | "Yū Hanabi" | Mirai Cococompy | Credited as Junky featuring Chōcho | |
| 2011 | "Yūhikaoka" "Taiyō to Tsuki no Rondo" | Brilliant White Noise | Credited as Chōcho & Hana-tan for "Taiyō to Tsuki no Rondo" | |
| 2011 | "Happy Fate" | Mirai Nikki Inspired Album Vol. 1: Ingaritsu Noise | Image song album for the anime series Future Diary | |
| 2011 | "Koizakura" | Polyholic | Originally released at Comic Market 81 | |
| 2012 | "Authentic Symphony" | Mashiroiro Symphony Original Soundtrack | TV-size version theme song to Mashiroiro Symphony anime television series | |
| 2012 | "7th Heaven" | Mirai Nikki Inspired Album Vol. 2: Ingaritsu Decibel | Image song album for the anime series Future Diary | |
| 2012 | "Kawaru Mirai" | Heart of Magic Garden | Collaboration song album with the song from the anime series Heaven's Memo Pad | |
| 2012 | "Dive into your fate" | The Legend of Heroes: Trails in the Sky The Animation Vocal Collection | Collaboration song album with the song for the anime series The Legend of Heroes: Trails in the Sky The Animation | |
| 2013 | "DreamRiser" | Girls und Panzer Original Soundtrack | TV-size version theme song to Girls und Panzer anime television series | |
| 2014 | "Groove Prayer" | Groove Coaster (Original Soundtrack) | Credited as Cosio Feat. Choucho | |
