= Penguin Musume =

Japanese manga series

- Cover of the first volume

ペンギン娘 (Pengin Musume)
- Genre: Gag comedy
- Manga
- Written by: Tetsuya Takahashi
- Published by: Akita Shoten
- Magazine: Weekly Shōnen Champion
- Original run: May 25, 2006 – November 22, 2007
- Volumes: 3
- Manga

Penguin Musume Max
- Written by: Tetsuya Takahashi
- Published by: Akita Shoten
- Magazine: Champion Red
- Original run: December 19, 2007 – January 19, 2010
- Volumes: 4
- Original net animation

Penguin Musume Heart
- Directed by: Hitoyuki Matsui
- Produced by: Takashi Nakanishi; Ryuuji Kosaka; Ritsuhisa Kiube
- Written by: Tatsuo Higuchi; Kazuharu Satou
- Music by: CAS
- Studio: Picture Magic
- Released: April 19, 2008 – November 25, 2008
- Episodes: 22 (+ 1 extra episode)
- icon

Penguin Musume (Japanese: ペンギン娘, Hepburn: Pengin Musume; lit. "Penguin Girl") is a Japanese manga series written and illustrated by Tetsuya Takahashi. The manga was serialized in the shōnen manga magazine Weekly Shōnen Champion between May 2006 and November 2007. The manga was followed by Penguin Musume Max, serialized in Champion Red from December 2007 to January 2010.

An original net animation adaptation titled Penguin Musume Heart was streamed on Nico Nico Douga between April and November 2008.

== Plot ==
The story follows Sakura 'Penguin' Nankyoku and her friends Kujira Etorofu and Nene Kurio through their daily lives. They are often corrupted by either Penguin herself, her economic rival Mary Whitebear, or other people who have interest in the Nankyoku family. Sakura Nankyoku is a total otaku. Due to a fluke, she gets elected as her class' student council president. Everything takes off from there into a series of crazy misadventures revolving around Sakura, her family, and her classmates.

== Characters ==
=== Main characters ===
Sakura 'Penguin' Nankyoku (南極 さくら, Nankyoku Sakura)
Voiced by: Azusa Kataoka
The lead character is obsessed with manga and anime. Whenever she cosplays as someone, she obtains the abilities of the outfit she is wearing. She is part of a very rich family and is nicknamed Penguin (ペンギン, Pengin) due to her penguin-like hairstyle and her surname which means "South Pole". Growing up with anime and manga has led her to have an erratic and slightly perverted personality, and she often latches on to her female friends.
Kujira Etorofu (択捉 鯨, Etorofu Kujira)
Voiced by: Mariya Ise
A girl who is skilled in Etorofu martial arts. She was raised as a boy by her father to become a strong fighter, and while she has since realized she is actually a girl, her father hasn't. She is generally hounded by Penguin due to a likeness to one of her favorite anime stars.
Nene Kurio (栗尾 ねね, Kurio Nene)
Voiced by: Yoshino Nanjō
A calm girl who always remains composed with a smile on her face, no matter what happens. She lives near the shrine and works as a shrine maiden, but she also has some ninja-esque capabilities.
Cha Chi (シャー・チー, Chā Chī)
Voiced by: Sakura Nogawa
A strong fighter from China who is skilled in her family's martial arts. She made a promise with Kujira, who was still under the delusion she was a boy, that if Cha could defeat her, Kujira would become her husband. While Kujira has since realized she was a girl, Cha still remains clueless and vows to make her her husband someday, often going against people who would steal her away.
Kaede Nankyoku (南極 楓, Nankyoku Kaede)
Voiced by: Rina Hidaka
Penguin's younger sister, who is a lot more composed than her. She generally has to sort out Penguin's errors and punish her by sending her to 'the lecture house'.
Marie Chupacabra W. Whitebear (マリー・チュパカブラ・W・ホワイトベア, Marī Chupakabura W. Howaitobea)
Voiced by: Mai Kadowaki
Penguin's rival, represented by a polar bear. She is almost always accompanied by her servants, the White Knights. A tragic moment in her past has caused her to despise the Nankyoku company, and constantly seeks to overwhelm it, normally by building something bigger than what they have. Later on though, she becomes bankrupt and has to use tattered clothing while maintaining her lady-like dignity. She is also referred to as 'Shirokuma' (a literal translation of Whitebear) and is sometimes called 'Kuma-san' by Penguin.

=== The White Knights ===
Maguro Hōjiro (頬城 鮪, Hōjiro Maguro)
Voiced by: Masami Suzuki
Maguro Hojiro is Marie's right-hand woman and one of her four knights. She wears an eyepatch and a maid's outfit. Maguro has a fierce composure, but becomes shy around Kujira and communicates with cutesy text messages.
Mary Chupacabra W. Whitebear (メアリ・チュパカブラ・W・ホワイトベア, Meari Chupakabura W. Howaitobea)
Voiced by: Yukako Yoshikawa
Nicknamed 'Hunting Maria', Mary is Marie's younger sister and one of her four knights. She is proficient in rapier techniques and has a sadistic streak, as well.
Kiyomi Kodami (児魂 清海, Kodami Kiyomi)
Voiced by: Satomi Akesaka
Kiyomi Kadami is one of Marie's four knights. She generally shows her prowess as a quiz show host.
Karei Ijuin (伊集院 鰈, Iijuin Karei)
Voiced by: Yuto Suzuki
Kare Ijuin is one of Marie's four knights. Kare is actually a transvestite.

=== Kurobara Communications ===
Mariana (マリアナ)
Voiced by: Chieko Honda
Head of Kurobara Communications, nicknamed Black Rose, who organizes the kidnap of Marie as bait for Penguin. She takes a rather unhealthy interest in Penguin and uses a thorned whip to punish her opponents. She is actually Penguin's mother.
Aqua (アクア, Akua)
Voiced by: Rumi Shishido
Chief of Kurobara Communications. She specializes in using all kinds of cards to attack, but can also attack using her long hair. She constantly has to bail her assistant, Reef, out of jams during missions.
Reef (リーフ, Rīfu)
Voiced by: Tomoko Akiya
Aqua's assistant. She is called out to execute missions for Kurobara Communications, but her actions usually end up backfiring against her.

=== Others ===
Sebastian (セバスチャン, Sebasuchan)
Voiced by: Kōji Ishii
The Nankyoku's family butler. He has a wide variety of skills used to serve Penguin and Kaede, and occasionally dresses in women's clothing.
Saki Hojiro (頬城 咲, Hōjiro Saki)
Voiced by: Jun Miruno
Maguro's little sister. Just like her sister, she is bashful and mostly communicates through text messages. She immediately becomes the victim of Penguin's affections, but luckily seems to rather enjoy them.
Shira K Sosu (シーラ・K・ンス, Shīra Kē Sosu)
The leader of the Hotsuyoku Yakuta, who appears in the Penguin Musume MAX manga. She constantly tries to kidnap the Nankyokus to hold for ransom in order to pay the rent. Her name is generally forgotten by Penguin whenever they meet.

== Media ==
=== Manga ===
Penguin Musume is written and illustrated by Tetsuya Takahashi. It was first published in one-shot chapters in Akita Shoten's Weekly Shōnen Champion from April 20 to May 18, 2006. The manga started its regular serialization on May 25, 2006, and finished on November 22, 2007. Its chapters were compiled into three tankōbon volumes, released from February 8, 2007, to February 8, 2008.

It was followed by Penguin Musume Max, which was serialized in Champion Red from December 19, 2007, to January 19, 2010. Its chapters were compiled into four tankōbon volumes, released from August 20, 2008, to March 19, 2010.

=== Original net animation ===
An original net animation (ONA) adaptation by Picture Magic, titled Penguin Musume Heart (ペンギン娘♥はぁと, Pengin Musume ♥ Hāto), was streamed on Nico Nico Douga between April 19, 2008, and November 25, 2008. The series uses three pieces of theme music, one opening and two endings. The opening theme is "Renai Jiyuu Shōjo♀" (恋愛自由少女♀, Romantic Free-loving Girls) by Azusa Kataoka, Mariya Ise, Yoshino Nanjou, Sakura Nogawa, Mai Kadowaki and Rina Hidaka. For episodes 1–11, the ending theme is "Yurete Hajikete Afurechau☆Miwaku no Penguin Musume" (揺れてはじけてあふれちゃう☆魅惑のペンギン娘, Shake, Repel, Overflow☆Penguin Girl's Fascination) by Kataoka, Ise, Nanjou and Hidaka, whilst the ending theme for episodes 12-22 is "Yurayura + Yuriyura + Nanananaa" (ゆらゆら+ゆりゆら+ななななー) by Kataoka, Ise and Nanjou, the animation of which was produced by IOSYS.
