= Gokujo =

Gokujo may refer to:

- Gokujō Parodius! ～Kako no Eikō o Motomete～, 1994 video game
- Gokujo Seitokai, 26 episode anime series from 2005
- Gokujyo, 12 episode anime series from 2012
