= List of Carnival Phantasm characters =

The following is a list of characters from the OVA and manga series Carnival Phantasm, written by Eri Takenashi, Type-Moon for the manga, and Makoto Uezu for the OVA. The series focuses on funny and absurd situations happening to the various characters of the Type-Moon franchises, mostly from Fate/stay night and Tsukihime.

== Fate/stay night and Fate/hollow ataraxia characters ==
Shirō Emiya (衛宮 士郎, Emiya Shirō)
Voiced by: Noriaki Sugiyama
The main protagonist of the Fate/stay night series. Appears in most Fate/stay night segments of Carnival Phantasm. He is shown to enjoy spending time with the girls in his life and will often bend over backwards to keep them all happy, including agreeing to go on four simultaneous dates so that none of them would feel sad or neglected. Shirou is very naive and believes that his girls all get along fine and seems generally unaware of some of their more underhanded attempts to keep him to themselves, such as Illya hexing him with sleep paralysis so that she could sleep next to him.
Saber (セイバー, Seibā)
Voiced by: Ayako Kawasumi
One of the main heroines of Fate/stay night and considered to be the "main heroine" of the Fate segments. In Carnival Phantasm, Saber is shown to be very awkward and gullible in her attempts at living in and interacting with the modern world, to the point that she believes her maid outfit for her waitressing job at Ahnenerbe is merely common working attire. Due to her life as King Arthur she has a hard time openly expressing her love for Shirō and usually ends up blushing heavily and stuttering when confronted with a situation where she must openly express her affection, often forcing Shirō to make the first move. She turns into Saber Alter when her ahoge is plucked, and can only be restored to her original self by Shirou. Certain aspects of her character, such as an appreciation of good food, supernatural charisma, and love of lions, are greatly exaggerated.
Rin Tōsaka (遠坂 凛, Tōsaka Rin)
Voiced by: Kana Ueda
One of the main heroines of Fate/stay night. In Carnival Phantasm, she also appears in a Magical Girl alter ego form known as Kaleido Ruby. Her tsundere attitude, greed and lack of skill with modern technology are exaggerated.
Sakura Matō (間桐 桜, Matō Sakura; Sakura Matou in anime)
Voiced by: Noriko Shitaya
One of the main heroines of Fate/stay night. In comparison to Fate/stay night, has a greatly reduced role, receiving only one dedicated episode, and minor appearances in two other episodes, one of which almost entirely consists of her stalking Shirou while he is on dates with Saber and Rin after she figured out his and Shiki's multiple date plan. She seems to be obsessed with her role as her story's "tragic heroine" and enjoys playing the part to the point of absurdity, such as goading others into mistreating her for the sake of her role, to the point where she can't refrain from referring to her own "beauty" while Shinji attempts to rape her as if to rile him up further so as to make the scene that much more horrific.
Illyasviel von Einzbern (イリヤスフィール・フォン・アインツベルン, Iriyasufīru fon Aintsuberun)
Voiced by: Mai Kadowaki
Shirō's adoptive older sister. Illya is portrayed within the series as a spoiled brat, throwing tantrums when she doesn't get her way. She is in love with Shirō (who only loves her as a sibling) and is very possessive of him. She sees the other girls as threats and constantly battles with Rin for Shirō's attention. She is not above using her magecraft to get her way, including the use of a sleep spell on Shirō, followed by a paralyzing curse so that she would either have the opportunity to sleep next to him or "awaken" him with a kiss. She is one of the announcers of the Holy Grail War in the first episode, though her servant Berserker still competes by himself. She appears in the Phantas-Moon movie as an Angra Mainyu-like monster, complaining about her lack of a route before being calmed by a combined attack from Arcueid and Rin and realizing that she is still beloved by the Type-Moon community regardless.
Lancer (ランサー, Ransā)
Voiced by: Nobutoshi Canna
A hotheaded, prideful Servant of Kirei Kotomine and Bazett Fraga McRemitz. One of the recurring gags with Lancer in Carnival Phantasm is that due to bad luck, he will always be killed off in every episode. The other characters will exclaim, "Lancer died!" and "You bastards!". This appears to be a reference to Kenny from South Park. He is in love with his would-be master, Bazett, who loves him in kind and any conversation they have eventually devolves into flirting and loving words, much to Caren's annoyance.
Caster (キャスター, Kyasutā)
Voiced by: Atsuko Tanaka
The Servant and wife of Sōichirō Kuzuki and a talented mage. While Caster in the canon series is haughty and cruel, Caster in Carnival Phantasm flips between acting dignified and lovestruck over her master/husband. Although she is devoted to Sōichirō, she also has an obsession with Saber, creating dozens of figurines of her and hoping to kidnap her so she can dress up Saber in homemade outfits. Unlike the visual novel and anime, she almost never wears her hooded cloak.
Berserker (バーサーカー, Bāsākā)
Voiced by: Tadahisa Saizen
The Servant of Illyasviel von Einzbern. Berserker is powerful and foolish, yet well-meaning. Under Illya's control, she frequently uses him for menial tasks like shopping for batteries. He has a fondness for Lancer (which Lancer does not return), often chasing after him and lugging him around, and even using him as a weapon. He is capable of transforming into a tank-like vehicle, dubbed "Berser-Car".
Assassin (アサシン, Asashin)
Voiced by: Shin-ichiro Miki
A Servant summoned by Caster. Assassin's movement is confined only to within the gate of the Ryūdōji Temple, so as such he is usually represented by a cardboard cutout Caster carries around to stand in for him. However, he manages to finally leave the temple during the Holy Grail Grand Prix, via the loophole of carrying the gate around with him aboard a truck. Due to having been trapped in one location for so long, Assassin has gone crazy and holds conversations with the inanimate gate, treating it like a loyal friend.
Gilgamesh (ギルガメッシュ, Girugamesshu)
Voiced by: Tomokazu Seki, Aya Endo (child)
An arrogant Servant who is constantly showing off his wealth and interrupting others much to everyone's chagrin. Gilgamesh also makes an appearance as a younger version of himself, Caren Hortensia's Servant. Unlike his older self, the younger Gilgamesh is more kind and respectful. His lust for Saber is shown to extend to her Saber Alter side, unlike in Fate/stay night where he loses all interest in her, but his feelings becomes more masochistic and he is reduced to a meek and subservient slave in her presence.

== Tsukihime and Melty Blood characters ==
Shiki Tohno (遠野 志貴, Tōno Shiki)
Voiced by: Kenji Nojima
The main character of Tsukihime. He is portrayed as a playboy of sorts who enjoys the company of the women who are in love with him and the challenge of balancing all five of them at once, unlike his counterpart Shirō (who sees him as unfaithful), but often finds himself used as a prize as his girls compete for his affections unlike Shirō, whose harem gets along with only some passive-aggressive behavior.
Arcueid Brunestud (アルクェイド・ブリュンスタッド, Arukweido Buryunsutaddo)
Voiced by: Ryōka Yuzuki
One of the main heroines of Tsukihime and main heroine of the show's Tsukihime segments. Unlike most of the cast, she is unfazed with various absurd things happening in the show. She is also the star of her own segment where she plays her magical girl alter-ego "Phantasmoon" where she fights mushroom-like monsters.
Ciel (シエル, Shieru)
Voiced by: Kumi Sakuma
One of the main heroines of Tsukihime. In the series, her love of curry is exaggerated and is constantly at odds with Arcueid and Akiha due to all of them being in love with Shiki. A running gag in the series has her being mistaken for an Indian due to the smell of curry on her body.
Akiha Tohno (遠野 秋葉, Tōno Akiha)
Voiced by: Hitomi
One of the main heroines of Tsukihime. In this series, her tsundere personality is exaggerated, with her "angry" stage represented by her hair turning red, a reference to her demonic heritage. The "Phantasmoon" segments portray her as the villain and nemesis of Arcueid, although her "evil" plots are merely good deeds like feeding stray dogs or drawing a manga.
Hisui (翡翠, Hisui)
Voiced by: Miyu Matsuki
One of the main heroines of Tsukihime. Along with exaggeration of her emotionless persona, she also is the subject of frequent references to inside jokes within the fans, such as "Brainwashing Detective Hisui," and hypnotism.
Kohaku (琥珀, Kohaku)
Voiced by: Naoko Takano
One of the main heroines of Tsukihime. In Carnival Phantasm, she is portrayed as a mad scientist/witch, a reference to her role in Tsukihime.
Satsuki Yumizuka (弓塚 さつき, Yumizuka Satsuki)
Voiced by: Omi Minami
A classmate of Shiki, also known as Sacchin. A running gag with her is that the cast frequently cannot remember her name, which is a reference to her route being cut from the original visual novel. She leads a three-girl comedy troupe called the "After-school Alleyway Alliance", with Sion Atlasia (Rio Natsuki) and Riesbyfe Stridberg (Akeno Watanabe). Their segments follow a formula where Sacchin starts the act by speaking about some topic, Riesbyfe gets distracted and derails the act, the two get into an argument, and Sion confuses them all by claiming the entire event was all within her calculations.

== Ahnenerbe Cafe ==
Neco Arc (ネコアルク)
Voiced by: Ryōka Yuzuki
An anthropomorphic cat spirit and employee of Ahnenerbe resembling Arcueid. She along with the other cats serve as the hosts of the show and often comment on the episode's story, as well as introduce upcoming segments in interludes. In some episodes she plays other roles aside from host.
Neco Arc Chaos (ネコアルク・カオス)
Voiced by: Jōji Nakata
An anthropomorphic cat spirit resembling Nrvnqsr Chaos. He is often seen smoking a cigarette. He is obsessed with the idea of "manliness" and often uses strange phrases to describe things, such as claiming that laser beams are "unisex".
Neco Arc Destiny (ネコアルク・ディスティニー)
Voiced by: Atsuko Tanaka
A pink haired anthropomorphic cat spirit. She is sensible and converses regularly with the others with a more reserved attitude and is often seen drinking with Neco Arc Chaos. She is also prone to occasional bouts of drama and fantasizes about settling down and having children of her own some day.
Neco Arc Bubbles (ネコアルク・バブルス)
Voiced by: Kumi Sakuma
A blond haired anthropomorphic cat spirit. She babbles and nods her head in agreement to any situations while keeping a spaced-out grin on her face.
Neco Arc Evolution (ネコアルク・エボリューション)
Voiced by: Kenji Nojima
An otaku anthropomorphic cat spirit. He is a big fan of magical girls, Type-Moon heroines, and cosplay. While not actually an employee of Ahnenerbe, he often hangs out with its staff and drags them to events outside the restaurant. He is also a huge fan of Saber and will prostrate himself before her when the two are in the same room.

== Other characters ==
Grail-kun (聖杯くん, Seihai-kun)
Voiced by: Noriko Shitaya
A giant slime-like creature which is the embodiment of all the evil in the Holy Grail. Grail-kun is the host of his own segment, reminiscent of Doraemon where various characters ask him for help over certain matters. Due to his nature, Grail-kun's solution to every problem is a kitchen knife, along with a flashy name for it and a suggestion to commit violence.
Red Saber (赤セイバー, Aka Seibā)
Voiced by: Sakura Tange
The female protagonist from the videogame Fate/Extra. While similar in appearance to Saber from Fate/stay Night, Red Saber is arrogant, proud and shamelessly flaunts her sexuality, noting that her transparent skirt does not bare her flesh, but rather 'deliberately allows others to see it'. She makes an appearance at the end of episode 8, during the Tiger Dojo segment where she mentions that she had heard that there was a 'carnival' taking place, but was disappointed to find that she had missed it.
