= List of Suzuka music =

While most anime have multiple albums released, Suzuka only has three. Each album has hours of background music (BGM), as well as vocals. All BGM were composed by Masanori Takumi, but the openings and endings were performed by COACH☆.

== Original Soundtracks (OSTs) ==
=== OST 1 ===
Suzuka Character Song Collection & Original Soundtrack Music Field 1

The first Suzuka OST to be released, it contained many original vocals by Tonbow and Tapiko, the lyricists, and Masanori Takumi. This album actually included a DVD as well, featuring COACH☆ performing "Start Line." It was released on September 22, 2005, by King's Records.

KICA-714

Track	Japanese Title	Approx. Translation
1	Sutato Rain (TV EDIT ver)	Start Line (TV EDIT ver.)
2	Aoi Field (TV EDIT ver)	Blue Field (TV EDIT ver.)
3	DREAM	DREAM
4	乙女座の恋	The Love of a Virgo
5	ゲッチュ!	Get Smooched!
6	Yakusoku	Promise
7	涼風-メインテーマ-	Suzuka -Main Theme-
8	朝の風景	Morning Scenery
9	幸せが続くように	May Happiness Continue
10	今は素直になれる	Now I Can Be Honest
11	ある休日の場面	Some Holiday Scene
12	コミカルノスタルジック	Comical Nostalgia
13	Mystic Space	Mystic Space
14	遠い日の傷跡-Piano-	Scars from Long Ago -Piano-
15	記録更新	Record Renewal
16	夕暮れの校庭	A Campus Evening
17	大人のおんな	An Adult Woman
18	落ち込んだってしょうがない	No Sense in Being Depressed
19	コミカルトラブル	Comical Trouble
20	頭がもやもや	Head is Puffy Puffy
21	ここちいいぬくもり	A Pleasant Warmth
22	戸惑う胸の思い	Thoughts of an Uncertain Heart
23	男は心に決めた	A Man Chooses the Heart
24	大和のテーマ	Yamato's Theme
25	安信のテーマ	Yasunobu's Theme
26	涼風のテーマ	Suzuka's Theme
27	萌果のテーマ	Honoka's Theme
28	Sutato Rain-Harmonica-	Start Line -Harmonica-

=== OST 2 ===
Suzuka Character Song Collection & Original Soundtrack Music Field 2

This second OST complete with a character song collection was released on November 23, 2005, also by King's Records.

KICA-735

Track	Japanese Title	Translation
1	Kimi no Koto	About You
2	My Friend	My Friend
3	あこがれ	Object of Yearning
4	My Love	My Love
5	遠い日の傷跡	Scars from Long Ago
6	おはよう！	Good Morning!
7	情熱のスプリンター	Passionate Sprinter
8	見つめる先に	Before You Glare
9	ドジ	Screw Up
10	いつもの笑顔で	With the Usual Smiling Face
11	熱血トレーニング	Intense Training
12	外輪雨降り	Outside Rain
13	子供の頃の思い出	Childhood Memories
14	教室の生徒達	The Students in the Classroom
15	ピユアな心	Pure Heart
16	ライバル出現！	Rival Appearance!
17	プレシツヤー	Pressure
18	日常のひとこま	A Daily Instance
19	裏腹なこころ	Conflicting Heart
20	ヤキモキするの	You Jealous?
21	自身満々	Full of Confidence
22	ブルーな気持ち	Feeling Blue
23	Sutato Rain -Piano-	Start Line -Piano-
24	ぎこちないふたり	The Uncomfortable Couple
25	どうしてうまくいかないの？	Why does it not go Well?
26	がんばるぞ！	I'm Going to Try Hard!
27	優しさに包てまれ	May You Be Enveloped in Kindness
28	涼風－メインテーマ －Piano-	Suzuka -Main Theme- Piano
29	それ行けカープ	Go Carps

== Suzuka singles album ==
Suzuka OP ED Single – Start Line [COACH☆] In addition to the two OSTs, King's Records has also included an album/CD for those who wish to sing karaoke to the music. This album was released on August 13, 2005.

KICM-3110

Track	Name
1	Start Line
2	Aoi Field
3	Start Line (off vocal version)
4	Aoi Field (off vocal version)

== Opening and ending themes ==
The anime version of Suzuka features pieces performed by COACH☆ as the Opening and theme songs.

Opening

1. Start Line by COACH☆

Closing

1. Aoi FIELD by COACH☆ (1-14)
2. Kimi no Koto (君のこと) by COACH☆ (15-26)

== COACH☆ ==
COACH☆ is a group made up of Ai Hayashi, Satomi Akesaka, Hatsumi Miura, Yumiko Hosono and Michie Kitaura. Each member of COACH☆ also has a voice part in Suzuka, as follows:

Hatsumi Miura as Megumi Matsumoto, a college student with glasses who lives in Ayano's dormitory and is Yuka's neighbor
Michie Kitaura as Nana Shirokawa, a popular singing idol and Honoka's friend and mentor
Satomi Akesaka as Miho Fujikawa, Ayano's daughter and Yamato's younger cousin by two years
Yumiko Hosono as Honoka Sakurai, a Shinto shrine maiden, Suzuka's classmate and Yamato's other love interest
Ai Hayashi as Rie Akitsuki, Yamato's younger sister who is still in Hiroshima

COACH☆ sings every vocal piece in Suzuka, which are Start Line, Aoi Field, Kimi no Koto, DREAM, 乙女座の恋 (), ゲッチュ! (), ヤクソク (), My Friend, あこがれ (), and My Love. Incidentally, My Love was the karaoke piece that Nana sings for the group in episode 17.

The only music video COACH☆ has ever released was of Start Line, included in a DVD that came with the first OST.
