= Saint October =

Japanese anime television series

- Saint October logo
- Genre: Magical girl, Mystery, Parody, Action, Supernatural, Tarot cards
- Anime television series
- Directed by: Masafumi Satō
- Studio: Studio Comet
- Original network: Chiba TV
- Original run: January 4, 2007 – June 28, 2007
- Episodes: 26
- Manga
- Written by: Kiira
- Published by: Mag Garden
- Magazine: Monthly Comic Blade
- Original run: June 30, 2006 – July 30, 2007
- Volumes: 2
- icon

Saint October (セイントオクトーバー) is a 2007 Japanese anime television series created by Konami Digital Entertainment. Animated by Studio Comet, it premiered on Chiba TV on January 4, 2007, in Japan. The series revolves around three girl detectives who use magical powers to solve mysteries. The series' portrayal of magic makes extensive use of tarot symbolism.

It was also adapted into a manga series by Kiira (stylized as Kiira~☆), which was serialized in the Japanese magazine Monthly Comic Blade published by Mag Garden in August 2006.

== Plot ==
Saint October tells the story of a group of three girls, who work for the Kuroki Detective Agency (黒木探偵社, Kuroki Tanteisha) in Alkana City (アルカナシティ, Arukana Shiti). The story begins during a case to catch a mysterious masked kidnapper who has been kidnapping young boys for a strange man. Kotono, a member of the agency, was working hard on the case. One night after returning home late, Kotono runs into a young boy who's crying alone. With nowhere else to take him, Kotono brings him back to her home at Joshua's church where it is discovered that he has amnesia and cannot remember even his own name. While there, Natsuki Shirafuji, Kotono's friend and fellow detective, arrives to add further information to the kidnapping case. Suddenly, the masked kidnapper appears and successfully kidnaps the boy, but Kotono chases after him and gets the boy back after a short scuffle. Just when all looks lost, the boy uses a magical power to bestow to Kotono a similar power in order to defeat the kidnapper. After she won, he reveals that he remembered what his name is: Ewan. Now the focus has turned to who is the kidnapper's boss who has been pursuing Ewan.

== Characters ==
=== Protagonists ===
Kotono Hayama (葉山 小十乃, Hayama Kotono) Voiced by: Azusa Kataoka
Kotono is a young, usually cheerful, girl working for the Kuroki Detective Agency. As a child, she was abandoned near a church with no memories of who she was or where she came from. The church's priest, Joshua, took her in as his own daughter. Her card is Justice and she transforms into Loli Black. Her weapon is a sword which she uses as a final attack on the enemy.

Natsuki Shirafuji (白藤 菜月, Shirafuji Natsuki) Voiced by: Yukari Fukui
Natsuki is Kotono's good friend of equal age and fellow member of the agency. She comes from a rich family. Her card is Moon and she transforms into Loli White. Her weapon is a pair of nun chucks.

Misaki Hijiri (聖 三咲, Hijiri Misaki) Voiced by: Yu Kobayashi
Misaki is a mysterious and agile girl. In the past episodes it was shown that her hometown was attacked and that she has a mission. Her card is Strength and she transforms into Loli Red. Her weapon is a bow and arrow

Joshua (ヨシュア, Yoshua) Voiced by: Yuuki Ono
Joshua is a priest who is a member of the detective agency and Kotono's foster father after she was left at his church. Despite Kotono insisting he is merely her foster father, he thinks of himself as her real father.

Kōshirō Kuroki (黒木 功士朗, Kuroki Kōshirō) Voiced by: Naru Kawamoto
Kōshirō is head of the Kuroki Detective Agency though is often bogged down by work and doesn't get much respect from his colleagues.

Ewan (ユアン, Yuan) Voiced by: Masami Suzuki
Ewan is a young boy who has amnesia. He initially gave Kotono her magical powers and the other Goth Loli.

Artista (アルティスタ, Arutisuta) Voiced by: Yumiko Hosono
Artista is a fortune teller who is also an old friend of Joshua and Kōshirō, she sometimes helps the girls out with her fortune-telling abilities.

Eddie Tsukahara (エディ塚原, Edii Tsukahara) Voiced by: Hitoshi Bifu

=== Antagonists ===
Kurtz (クルツ, Kurutu) Voiced by: Kenjirō Tsuda

Ash (アッシュ, Asshu) Voiced by: Takehito Koyasu

Esmeralda (エスメラルダ) Voiced by: Erika
Esmeralda is a new antagonist that appears in the middle of the series, she is the younger sister of the first antagonist Herlock.

Herlock (エルロック) Voiced by: Tsuyoshi Maeda
Originally he is the masked man who steals the boys and takes them away. He took it up as a mission but soon got bored from doing it. After he kidnaps them he keeps them in his room, allowing them to destroy the place. He works for Kurtz and, he too, had a card. His number was the "Number 1" card which gave him the Magician ability. He was the first to get judgment from Kotono and soon after was jailed. His name is considered to have come from Captain Harlock.

=== Others ===
Richard (リチャード, Richaado) Voiced by: Takashi Matsuyama

Ryōhei Mikado (帝 猟兵, Ryōhei Mikado) Voiced by: Toshiyuki Toyonaga

== Adaptations ==
=== Anime ===
The Saint October anime series, created by Konami Digital Entertainment, first aired in Japan on January 4, 2007, on Chiba TV and is set to contain 26 episodes. The first DVD will go on sale on March 21, 2007.

==== Episodes ====
No.	Title	Original release date
1	"Loli Born! A Girl Becomes Super Goth-Loli!" (ロリ誕生!少女が超ゴスロリに!)	January 4, 2007
A masked man has been kidnapping young boys for an unknown purpose and the Kuroki Detective Agency is hot on the case. Kotono meets a young boy named Juan who is mysteriously connected to the whole ordeal.
2	"Loli Surprised! The Rumored Beauty Super Invades!" (ロリ吃驚(びっくり)!噂の美女が超襲来!)	January 11, 2007
Firena, a washed up TV personality with breast implants, has been enlisted by Company Reverse to attempt to kidnap Juan, but is ultimately stopped by Kotono.
3	"Loli United Battle! Even the Young Lady Super Transforms!" (ロリ共闘!お嬢様だって超変身!)	January 18, 2007
Natsuki becomes jealous of Juan because Kotono is constantly spending time with him and worrying about him, to the point that Kotono forgot about the plans Natsuki and her had made to go shopping after school, instead going to the Reverse company headquarters to ask about Firena and what she wanted with Juan. When Kotono realizes why Natsuki is acting strangely, she brings Juan with her to apologize at Natsuki's mansion. Meanwhile, a black cat that Kurtz enlisted to make him look more like a villain is being controlled by Kurtz to find Kotono. Back a Natsuki's, Natsuki's various attempts to eliminate Juan have failed, and she, Kotono, Juan, and Koushirou are outside having tea. When Juan says he has to go to the bathroom, Natsuki jumps on the chance and offers to take him. Even then, her plots fail. But when Juan finds a Kotono doll in Natsuki's room, she realizes she has been attempting to terrorize a young boy with no memory out of spite, and feels guilty when she thinks about Kotono being all he has. She is beginning to warm to him when Kurtz's black cat finds Kotono, turning into a huge, panther-like cat with the fangs of a saber-tooth tiger. Kotono runs away into the woods, but the panther is close behind. Juan gives Natsuki powers like Kotono's and the two defeat the cat.
4	"Loli Troubled! The Vampire from the Super Daytime!" (ロリ迷惑!超昼間から吸血鬼!)	January 25, 2007
In the beginning in the reverse company Sophia's henchmen Kafkaf clones himself and is told to find and defeat Judgement and goes to Kotono's school. Meanwhile, Kotono is late and as she gets to the school, her breakfast is stolen by Ryohei and is holding a grudge against him in class, also the clone manages to get into the school and meanwhile Kotono with Natsuki are excused from class so Kotono is allowed to get her breakfast just as they do, they hear a scream and head to the gym to find a girl unconscious on the stage they take her to the infirmary where they find her ribbon missing to then find bite marks on her neck, later more girls come in with their ribbons missing. We find out earlier the vampire is biting girls for their ribbons. Later Kotono and Natsuki eat Joshua's garlic cake to protect themselves later all students are told class is cancelled while their Kotono looks around the school to be found by the vampire she runs to the roof then falls of to be caught by Ryohei Natsuki tries to distract the clone but is almost bitten then to be saved by Kotono then the two quote he is a "perverted vampire" and defeat the clone.
5	"Loli Rematch! Elrock's Super Revenge!" (ロリ再戦!エルロックの超リベンジ!)	February 1, 2007
6	"Loli Formation! The Super Detective Squad of Gothic Girls!" (ロリ結成!ゴスな少女の超探偵団!)	February 8, 2007
7	"Loli Suspicion! Joshua, His Super Hidden Love.." (ロリ疑惑!ヨシュア、超秘められたその愛··)	February 15, 2007
8	"Loli Devotion! Why? The Super Bowling with You!" (ロリ熱投!何故なの?あなたとの超ボーリング!)	February 22, 2007
9	"Loli Infiltration! At That Moment, the Super Big Thing on TV!" (ロリ潜入!その時、TVに映った超大物が!)	March 1, 2007
10	"Loli First Love! My Super Heart Reaches You!" (ロリ初恋!あなたに届け超マイハート!)	March 8, 2007
11	"Loli Suspicion! Joshua, His Super Hidden Love!" (ロリ激突!女の意地が超ごっつんこ!)	March 15, 2007
12	"Loli Pure Love! Sophia's Love Super Shines.." (ロリ純愛!ソフィアの愛は超輝いて··)	March 22, 2007
13	"Loli Lament! Worried and Confused, Super Maiden!!" (ロリ慟哭!悩んで迷って、超乙女!!)	March 29, 2007
14	"Loli Revenge! Take My Grudge!!" (ロリ復讐!あたちのうらみを超くらえでち!!)	April 5, 2007
15	"Loli Old Days! To Meet You in Your Memories..." (ロリ昔日!記憶のあなたに超会うために...)	April 12, 2007
16	"Loli Pink! Falling in Love with Super Homie Tight!" (ロリ桃色!フォーリンラブに超ホーミータイトでち!)	April 19, 2007
17	"Loli Elimination! The Two of us Were Lost in the Mountains!" (ロリ抹殺!山で遭難超二人きり!)	April 26, 2007
18	"Loli Rescue! The Young Lady's Determination is Super Magma!" (ロリ救出!お嬢の決意が超マグマ!)	May 3, 2007
19	"Loli Swimsuit! Unrequited Love Disappeared in the Waves..." (ロリ水着!波に消えた超片思い...)	May 10, 2007
20	"Loli Emergency! Friendship? Sympathy? Excessive Super Nursing!" (ロリ救急!友情?同情?過剰に超看病!)	May 17, 2007
21	"Loli Returns Home! World, Kneel Before Me!" (ロリ帰国!世界よ、われに超ひざまづけ!)	May 24, 2007
22	"Loli Revealed! My Super Mysterious Secret!" (ロリ公開!超NAZO·NAZOな私のヒミツ!)	May 31, 2007
23	"Loli In A Predicament! Before you know it, You're Surrounded by Super Enemies!" (ロリ窮地!いつの間にやら超敵だらけ!)	June 7, 2007
24	"Loli Is Furious! Reclaiming Love, a Super Rush!" (ロリ激怒! 愛を奪還、超突入!)	June 14, 2007
25	"Loli Fierce Battle! Believe and Gaze upon Super Justice!" (ロリ激戦! 信じて見つめて超正義!)	June 21, 2007
26	"Loli Showdown! A Dazzling Fate with You!" (ロリ決着! めくるめくあなたと超運命!)	June 28, 2007

==== Theme songs ====
Opening theme
"Wheel of fortune" by Azusa Kataoka, Yukari Fukui and Yu Kobayashi
Ending Theme 1
"Michi naru Basho e" by Yukari Fukui(Ep 1–10, 12–13)
Ending Theme 2
"Sora no Kotoba" by Yu Kobayashi(Ep 14–25)
Ending Theme 3
"Melow Stereo" by Azusa Kataoka, Yukari Fukui and Yu Kobayashi(Ep 26)

=== Manga ===
The Saint October manga adaptation was first serialized in the Japanese shōnen manga magazine Monthly Comic Blade in August 2006, published by Mag Garden. It is illustrated by Kiira~☆.
