= Azusa Enoki =

Japanese actress

- 榎 あづさ
- Born: March 16, 1988 (age 38); Chiba Prefecture, Japan
- Other names: Azusa Kataoka; Adusa Kinoko
- Occupations: Actress; voice actress; singer
- Years active: 2004–present
- Agent: Still Wood Garden
- Height: 162 cm (5 ft 4 in)
- Musical career
- Genres: J-pop; Anison
- Instrument: Vocals
- Years active: 2007–present
- Label: Konami Digital Entertainment
- Formerly of: Lisp

Azusa Enoki (榎 あづさ, Enoki Azusa; born March 16, 1988), previously known as Azusa Kataoka (片岡 あづさ, Kataoka Azusa), is a Japanese actress, voice actress and singer from Chiba Prefecture, Japan. Some of her major roles are Nagisa Saitou in Squid Girl, Sakura Nankyoku in Penguin Musume, Uta Yumeno in Onegai My Melody, Kotono Hayama in Saint October, Mion Takamine in Pretty Rhythm. She, along with Kana Asumi and Sayuri Hara were part of a voice actress singing group called Lisp which performed anime theme songs for Haiyoru! Nyaruani: Remember My Mr. Lovecraft, Pretty Rhythm Aurora Dream, and Bakugan Battle Brawlers: Gundalian Invaders in Japan. She has also released an album called Sweets Paradise and a single called "Diamond Sparkle" which was a theme song for Sky Girls. Originally affiliated with 81 Produce, she now goes by the name of Azusa Enoki (榎 あづさ) and was represented by Sunaoka. She is currently a member of Still Wood Garden.

== Filmography ==
=== Anime ===
List of voice performances in anime
| Year | Title | Role | Notes | Source |
|---|---|---|---|---|
| 2004 | Aishiteruze Baby | Ayumi's friends | | |
| 2005–09 | Onegai My Melody series | Uta Yumeno | | |
| 2006 | Strawberry Panic! | Hitomi Togi | | |
| 2006 | Artificial Insect Kabuto Borg Victory by Victory | Minako | | |
| 2007 | Saint October | Kotono Hayama | | |
| 2007 | Sky Girls | Aisha Krishnam | | |
| 2008 | Penguin Musume Heaert | Sakura Nankyoku | | |
| 2010 | Jewelpet Twinkle | Sara | | |
| 2010 | Lilpri | Ringo's Septuplet Brothers, others | | |
| 2010 | K-On!! | Classmate | | |
| 2010 | Bakuman | Schoolgirl | | |
| 2010–11 | Squid Girl series | Nagisa Saitō | | |
| 2010–12 | Tantei Opera Milky Holmes | Sonia Kurusu | Also Second Act | |
| 2010 | A Certain Magical Index II | Angelene | | |
| 2010 | Haiyoru! Nyaruani: Remember My Mr. Lovecraft | Atko | Also theme song as part of Lisp | |
| 2011 | Yumekui | Cat nurse B | | |
| 2011 | Da Capo II - T.P. Sakura - Time Paladin Sakura - Jikū Bōeisen | Alice Tsukishiro | OVA | |
| 2011–12 | Pretty Rhythm | Mion Takamine | Aurora Dream, Dear My Future | |
| 2011 | Hyouge Mono | Child | | |
| 2011 | Sekai-ichi Hatsukoi | High school girl | 2011 TV series | |
| 2011 | Bunny Drop | mother | | |
| 2012 | Zetman | Tomomi | | |
| 2012 | Shirokuma Cafe | Customer, kindergarten | | |
| 2012 | Eureka Seven AO | Beautiful woman | | |
| 2012 | Chōsoku Henkei Gyrozetter | Shinoda Martine | | |
| 2012 | Blast of Tempest | Girl | | |
| 2012 | Code:Breaker | Girl With Superpowers | | |
| 2014–15 | PriPara series | New | | |

== Discography ==
=== Albums ===
List of albums, with selected chart positions
| Title | Album information | Oricon |
| Title | Album information | Peak position |
|---|---|---|
| Sweets Paradise | Released: December 12, 2007; Label: Konami Digital Entertainment; Catalog No.: GFCA-00071/2 | 279 |

=== Singles ===
List of singles and character albums, with selected chart positions
| Title | Single information | Oricon |
| Title | Single information | Peak position |
|---|---|---|
| "Diamond Sparkle"; Second ending theme for Sky Girls | Released: October 24, 2007; Label: Konami Digital Entertainment; Catalog No.: GFCA-00056 | 94 |
| Switch On My Heart; Pretty Rhythm Aurora Dream Live Chick Character CD Act. 3 As Mion Takamine (Azusa Kataoka) | Released: July 20, 2011; Label: DIVE II Entertainment; Catalog No.: AVCA-29998 | 168 |

=== DVDs ===
- Sweet Box (2008)
