= Yakuza Girl – Blade Shikake no Hanayome =

Japanese manga

- Yakuza Girl - Blade Shikake no Hanayome
- Manga
- Written by: Masaki Motonaga
- Illustrated by: Yugo Okuma
- Magazine: Champion Red
- Original run: February 2008 – February 2009
- Volumes: 2

Yakuza Girl – Blade Shikake no Hanayome (ヤクザガール 〜ブレイド仕掛けの花嫁〜, Yakuza Girl – The Blade Wielding Bride) is a manga written by Masaki Motonaga and drawn by Yu-Go Okuma. It started in February 2008. The manga is the second work in Motonaga's Yakuza Girl series, after the light novel Yakuza Girl Missile Heart (ヤクザガール・ミサイルハート, Yakuza Gāru Misairu Hāto) from 2006 which has a similar setting.

It has been licensed in French by Soleil Manga.

== Story ==
Set in modern-day Japan on the grounds of Daihon Academy (Daihon Gakuen), the manga follows the protagonist Senguu Fumihiro as he enters the aforementioned academy, to find a wife and thus satisfy the wish of his grandmother (who wanted to see her great-grandchildren before dying). Of course, knowing absolutely nothing of what he sees as a top-level school, Fumihiro is caught completely off guard when he learns that technically every student and teacher of Daihon is in fact wielders of supernatural skills and powers. Worst however, is that the students, aggregated in "clans", are allowed to brutally murder each other - even their grades are based upon their enemies' death toll (i.e. the number of students of enemy clans they killed). In such an absurd scenario, Fumihiro's aid comes from Akari, the girl to whom he proposed when he saw her for the first time.

On a side note, one of the most peculiar features of Daihon, is a black, cylindrical tower that sits in what seems to be the center of the school compound, atop of which floats a black, translucent orb containing a World War II-era American B-29 Superfortress heavy bomber. As for now, it appears that the plane is way more than scenic display, and Fumihiro's newly acquired powers seems to be connected to the stasis-bound aircraft in more ways than one. It is later revealed in the final chapters of the series that the heavy bomber is actually the original Enola Gay, the World War II aircraft that would drop the Little Boy atomic bomb on Hiroshima. This event was stopped by the predecessor to Fumihiro's power of 'Cause and Effect', Major Narukawa, who trapped the aircraft in a sphere of frozen time. This divergence in the timestream resulted in the world of Yakuza Girl. Narukawa has remained inside the cylindrical tower until present day, all the while using his powers to keep the bomber frozen in time. Fumihiro, after manifesting his abilities, was chosen to be the successor of this responsibility.

== Characters ==
=== Senmetsu Clan ===
Senguu Fumihiro - A boy who was raised by his grandmother in the country and a first year high school student, Fumihiro transfers to Daihon Academy to find a bride and fulfill his grandmother's wish of having great-grandchildren before dying. He proposed to Akari after finding her bathing in a spring, and since then has pursued the idea of her being his fated wife. Comprehensibly weak since he wielded no special powers whatsoever, he acquired a Shikigei from Reiko, a beauty mark under his right eye. Thought to be a completely useless one, his power actually allows him to completely freeze the flow of time, except for himself, for a short while. In chapter nine however, Reiko reveals that his power is the ability to interfere with the law of 'Cause and Effect', making him able to change and alter whatever he wishes.

Senimaru Akari - A bespectacled girl who wields a katana and Fumihiro's classmate, Akari was initially assigned to protect Fumihiro after he transfers. She is cold towards most people except to Reiko, the leader of the clan Gusha Senmetsu (to which Fumihiro is assigned). Over time, she seems to have warmed up towards Fumihiro and is confused by why he wants her to be his bride. Not much is known of her past, other than that she was found by Reiko and since then adopted into her family, acquiring her surname in the process. Her Shikigei is under her left eye, but is described as "useless", and so far has never been used.

Arikawa Kotohiko - A bespectacled boy who is in the same class as Fumihiro, Kotohiko is cold towards Fumihiro but it has recently been shown that he cares a little bit about him, though he always appears as callous and frowning. His Shikigei, named Mystletein, is located on his right hand and grants him the power to shoot little but high piercing bullets from his fingers. While using this power, his whole hand and arm up to his elbow turn into a cannon-like appendage. Also, he can shrink down said weapon to just a finger in cases where concealment is deemed necessary.

Senimaru Reiko - Leader of the Gusha Senmetsu clan, she is an enigmatic third-year student who tends to regularly skip lessons and appears smoke frequently. She wears odd eyepatch on her right eye, and has the biggest Shigikei of all her clan tattooed on a good portion of her breasts, neck and shoulders. She is the only one to accept at open arms Fumihiro, and after giving him the power of a Shikigei, kisses him passionately while addressing him as "her groom". Also, she admitted to have killed the former commander of her Clan before taking over. Her power takes the same name as her Clan, Gusha Senmetsu(Genocide of the Foolish), and takes the form of long, wicked-like barbed vines of amazing sharpness and strength that burst out from her chest. She is also capable of surviving fatal wounds and healing them completely. In chapter 6 Reiko used the same incense she used to kill the previous commander of Yaguruma to paralyze Senguu and sleep with him. In chapter 7 she is attacked by Tsuji of the Hakkou Ichiu Clan when her back is turned as she was talking to Akari; her wounds healed and she killed Tsuji with her chivalrous power Gusha Senmetsu. She is later both raped and killed by Itagaki of the Hakkou Ichiu clan.

Mibu Akane - A second year student, Akane sports a very flashy dressing style, has a very muscular build and appears to enjoy fighting, so much so that she tends to get sexually aroused while fighting an opponent she finds strong enough. She also seems to be in a romantic relationship with fellow clan member Asukai Kagefumi, who tends to try to make money off her. Her Shikigei is on her left leg, but its powers are unknown.

Asukai Kagefumi - A second year student, Kagefumi looks younger than he is and is blunt. He seems to be in a romantic relationship with fellow clan member Mibu Akane, making her pose in awkward positions to earn money. His Shikigei is located behind his neck (though much of his power activates with his left eyeball which pops out of its socket before floating in front of him whenever he's activating his Shikigei), and has more than one ability, all of which seems to be named after different deities and myths from Ancient Egypt (Udjat and Atum being examples).

Kakimoto Rin - A second year student, of which practically nothing is known so far. She has the aesthetics of a child, always grinning and continuously gobbling sweets. While her Shikigei is unknown, she is one of the strongest members of her clan.

Ohshikouchi Tomoe - A third year student, possibly the most ladylike of all the females of the Gusha Senmetsu clan. She has a cute, innocent appearance and dresses in a regal kimono, and her mannerism and speaking way are as well peaceful, almost serene. Along with Kakimoto Rin, she is one of the strongest of her clan.

Izumi Masakuni - He is a third year student by name, but by fact he is nothing more than a little cardboard box with short legs, wide open, cartoonish eyes and stretching, snake-like arms. He often is by Reiko's side, and supposedly was with her way before the beginning of the series.

=== Gourmet Clan ===
Seabura Tarou - Leader of the Gourmet Clan, he is a towering, obese man obsessed with flesh as a source of power. He constantly eats, and his underlings appears to have his same habits, being all overweight and bald. His Shikigei, located on his head, turns him into a monstrous creature with a mouth similar to that of a crown of tentacles of a cephalopod and several tentacles on his back. His power, named Lard Paradise, allows him to fire concentrated jets of sticky, quickly-hardening grease. He was defeated by Akari, who hit him with such force that she forced all the grease in Tarou's body to melt. He tried to retaliate (and revealed himself as quite a fine-looking boy without his fat around) and kill Reiko, but was killed by Akari.

=== Dai Yaguruma Clan ===
Yuugao & Asagao - Two brutal, sadistic twins sent as a vanguard before the storm of the entire Dai Yaguruma Clan. Yuugao is the male of the pair, and often calls his sister Asagao "Nee-chan". Obsessed with love and the supposed power they got from it, they attacked the Gusha Senmetsu dormitory but were easily repelled by Akane and Kotohiko. While Yuugao was beaten, and supposedly killed, Asagao met her demise at her own hands, killing herself and using her own viscera as a flare to signal the beginning of her Clan's attack. Yuugao and Asagao's Shikigei, named Hana to Hebi, are symmetrical, and are located on the right and left elbow respectively (resembling a pair of eyes while activating): Yuugao's one is a contorted, barbed spear, while Asago's is a deformed shield shaped similarly to a cobra's head.

Yaguruma Suzumushi - Leader of the Dai Yaguruma Clan, she appears to have a bitter rivalry with Reiko. Most of her underlings refer to her as "aneki" (term for "older sister"). This comes from the fact that all of her Clan are blood related, as the offspring of Yaguruma all come from incest. Suzumushi herself is the top-notch "missile" of her Clan, and her Shikigei takes form of a pair of enormous blade-like wings that sprout from her head. She stormed the Gusha Senmetsu dormitory in hope to have her match with Reiko, only to find her sleeping soundly, oblivious of the mayhem. In the end she was unsuccessful again, and was punished and carried away, hand shackled, with her underlings, under the supervision of the school's chairman.

=== Hakkou Ichiu Clan ===
This clan is considered to be the most dangerous of all, not only due to having the highest count of members among all other clans, but also the most powerful and influential ones as well.

Itagaki - Commander of the Hakkou Ichiu, he is an extremely beautiful, almost androgynous third-year student. Under his facade of grace and finesse he is an arrogant and sadistic tyrant that, as he himself boasts, "loves to look down on others". He appears to enjoy drinking tea. His motivations and his Shikigei are by now unknown.

Tsuji - One of the bodyguards of Itagaki, she is presented as exceptionally strong, to the point of mauling an enormous Kronosaurus with just one hand (and posing for victory soon after, as a demonstration of her clan's power). She later attacked Akari, revealing that her power sits in her right leg, capable of morphing in an array of weapons such as a blade and a bow. She was brutally slaughtered by Reiko.

=== Daihon Discipline Committee ===
The Discipline Committee is not a Clan per se, as its duty is to prevent the students from escaping Daihon grounds. They all seem to wield Shikigeis.

Mikoshiba Kaoru - Leader of the ninth unit of the committee, she has a very stern, almost masculine personality, completely unforgiving even with her own underlings, even more so with those who break the rules. She appeared briefly, slaughtering two of her henchmen caught while trying to rape Akari, and proceeded to brutally torture Akari herself when she took the blame for Fumihiro's escape. She almost killed her, but instead let Fumihiro take the blame by making him sign with his own blood an oath to never try to flee again, otherwise condemning him to a grisly, suffering death. Her Shikigei is located on her neck, and its power is known as Kuroibara, with which Kaoru's legs change into a mass of black, thorn-covered, blade-ending tentacles. As it has been suggested by a brief conversation between Kaoru and her Shikigei, she herself has some gruesome memory of Daihon, as the tattoo was surprised that she "let those two go so easily".

=== Persona non Grata ===
This term is used to describe individuals who wish to undo the world of Yakuza Girl and replace it with another. The Hakkou Ichiu Clan wishes to replace it with their own ideal 'world of unity', in which they control all the Shikigei powers and the various clans are united under them. American bureaucrat Ackroyd, however, wishes to revert the world back to its original form, the world where Little Boy is successfully dropped on Hiroshima.

Ackroyd - An American bureaucrat who appears to be associated with Katsuhara, the founder of Daihon Academy, and Major Narukawa. He wishes to free the Enola Gay from the frozen time created by the Major so it can fulfill its mission of dropping the Little Boy atomic bomb on Hiroshima.

== Powers ==
Chivalrous Power - Supernatural powers which usually takes the shape of appendages or mutations made for combat, be it offensive or defensive or support. They often turn their wielder into bizarre, if not monstrous shapes. Others, however, affect or alter the user's immediate surroundings rather than the user's body itself

Shikigei - Coming from the words "Shiki" (Shikigami) and "gei" (Tattoo), it is the source from which the Chivalrous Powers come from. They manifest as tattoo of various patterns unique to the one who wields the Chivalrous Power to activate them. Each tattoo tends to grow and spread on its host's body, and appears to have a mind on its own (some have shown the ability to talk and reason with their wielders). While releasing its power, a Shikigei shows a reptilian eye in its center. It has been implied that the size of the Shikigei tattoo on its user's person, while in an inactive state, indicates the scope of power the yakuza can reach.
