= Lisp (group) =

Japanese girl group

- Origin: Japan
- Genres: J-pop; anison
- Years active: 2010-2011
- Label: Dive II Entertainment
- Past members: Kana Asumi; Azusa Kataoka; Sayuri Hara

Lisp (リスプ, Risupu; stylized LISP) was a Japanese girl group formed by 81 Produce in 2010. The members consist of three voice actresses under the same company: Kana Asumi, Azusa Kataoka, and Sayuri Hara. They disbanded on July 31, 2011.

== History ==
Lisp was formed as a girl group with the idea of having a "close connection to fans", and the name was selected to represent the members "growing together fans" even through the "clumsiness" of a lisp. The group consisted of Kana Asumi, Azusa Kataoka, and Sayuri Hara, voice actresses associated with 81 Produce.

In 2010, Lisp released their first and second digital singles, "Anata ni Vacuum! Choi Yawarakame" and "Anata ni Vacuum! Choi Katame", on the same day. On December 10, 2010, they released their third digital single, "Koisuru Otome no Catharsis." Wanting to promote the release, a short comic describing Asumi's journey to becoming a voice actress was published on December 25, 2010, in the magazine Cookie. The manga was written by Jun Kagurazaka and illustrated by Setsuko Yoneyama.

In February 2011, Lisp performed the song "Aru Imi! Kono Tabi?! Sensation" for the game Trickster. On April 13, they released their first major single, "You May Dream", as the first opening theme song to Pretty Rhythm: Aurora Dream, which the members voiced the main characters. On June 11, they released their second single, "Love the Music", which was the first ending theme song to Bakugan Battle Brawlers under the name "Lisp feat. Dan", which also included a performance by Yū Kobayashi, the voice of Dan. In June, Lisp announced that they were disbanding, with their last performance as a group during their first anniversary concert event on July 31.

== Members ==
- Kana Asumi (2010-2011)
- Azusa Kataoka (2010-2011)
- Sayuri Hara (2010-2011)

== Discography ==
=== Albums ===
List of albums, with selected chart positions, sales figures and certifications
Title	Year	Details	Peak chart positions	Sales
Title	Year	Details	JPN	Sales
Light in a Small Prism	2011	Released: April 27, 2011; Label: Dive II Entertainment; Format: CD, digital download	26	—
"—" denotes releases that did not chart or were not released in that region.

=== Singles ===
==== Major ====
List of singles, with selected chart positions, sales figures and certifications
Title	Year	Peak chart positions	Sales	Album
Title	Year	JPN	Sales	Album
"You May Dream"	2011	47	—	Light in a Small Prism
"Love the Music" (as Lisp feat. Dan (CV: Yū Kobayashi))	2011	132	—	Light in a Small Prism
"—" denotes releases that did not chart or were not released in that region.

==== Promotional ====
List of singles, with selected chart positions, sales figures and certifications
Title	Year	Peak chart positions	Sales	Album
Title	Year	JPN	Sales	Album
"Anata ni Vacuum! Choi Yawarakame" (あなたにVacuum!〜ちょいやわらかめ〜)	2010	—	—	Light in a Small Prism
"Anata ni Vacuum! Choi Katame" (あなたにVacuum!〜ちょいかため〜)	2010	—	—	Light in a Small Prism
"Koisuru Otome no Catharsis" (恋する乙女のカタルシス, Koisuru Otome no Katarushisu)	2010	—	—	Light in a Small Prism
"—" denotes releases that did not chart or were not released in that region.

== Publications ==
Year	Title	Publisher	ISBN	Notes	
2011	Lisp 1st Shashinshū: Lis-Photograph (LISP1st写真集〜LIS☆Photograph〜)	Shufu to Seikatsu-sha	ISBN 978-4072758083	–	Photobook
