= Place to Place =

Japanese manga and anime series

- Cover of the first manga volume, featuring Io Otonashi (left) and Miniwa Tsumiki (right)

あっちこっち (Atchi Kotchi)
- Genre: Romantic comedy
- Manga
- Written by: Ishiki
- Published by: Houbunsha
- Magazine: Manga Time Kirara
- Original run: 2006 – present
- Volumes: 10
- Anime television series
- Directed by: Fumitoshi Oizaki
- Produced by: Hiroyuki Kobayashi; Junichiro Tanaka; Kinya Watanabe; Masashi Takatori; Yoshiaki Uraki
- Written by: Nobuhiko Tenkawa
- Music by: Masaru Yokoyama
- Studio: AIC
- Licensed by: NA: Sentai Filmworks
- Original network: TBS
- English network: NA: Anime Network; SEA: Animax Asia
- Original run: April 5, 2012 – June 28, 2012
- Episodes: 12
- Original video animation
- Directed by: Fumitoshi Oizaki
- Written by: Nobuhiko Tenkawa
- Music by: Masaru Yokoyama
- Studio: AIC
- Licensed by: NA: Sentai Filmworks
- Released: November 16, 2012
- Runtime: 24 minutes

Place to Place (あっちこっち, Atchi Kotchi) is a Japanese four-panel manga series written and illustrated by Ishiki. The manga began serialization in Houbunsha's Manga Time Kirara magazine in 2006, with its chapters collected into ten volumes as of March 27, 2025. An anime television series adaptation by AIC aired on TBS between April and June 2012.

== Plot ==
The serious-minded Io and kind-hearted Tsumiki share a close bond and clearly care for one another, but they have yet to become a couple. Their relationship falls somewhere between friendship and romance, developing gradually through a sometimes awkward but genuine affection.

== Characters ==
=== Main characters ===
Tsumiki Miniwa (御庭 つみき, Miniwa Tsumiki)
Voiced by: Chiwa Saitō (Drama CD), Rumi Ōkubo (Anime)
The main female protagonist, Tsumiki is a somewhat petite tsundere (with Kuudere attitude) who is dainty in stature and in love with Io. She has a tendency to grow cat ears when petted or amused.
Io Otonashi (音無 伊御, Otonashi Io)
Voiced by: Takahiro Sakurai (Drama CD), Nobuhiko Okamoto (Anime)
Io is the main male protagonist who works part-time at Hatch Potch. Dense yet very kindhearted, he is unaware of Tsumiki's feelings for him, but nevertheless considers her close.
Hime Haruno (春野 姫, Haruno Hime)
Voiced by: Mai Nakahara (Drama CD), Kaori Fukuhara (Anime)
The clumsy and air-headed, yet sweet member of the group who works part-time at Hatch Potch. She also gets easily frightened compared to the other female characters. Hime gets nosebleeds whenever she becomes excited or infatuated by anything cute.
Mayoi Katase (片瀬 真宵, Katase Mayoi)
Voiced by: Kana Ueda (Drama CD), Hitomi Nabatame (Anime)
Along with Sakaki, Mayoi forms a prankster duo in the friendship circle. Very savvy with electronics and almost never seen without her lab coat, Mayoi loved to tease Tsumiki about her crush on Io. It is implied early on that she may be a masochist. She tends to end her sentences with "nyan".
Sakaki Inui (戌井 榊, Inui Sakaki)
Voiced by: Souichirou Hoshi (Drama CD), Shintarō Asanuma (Anime)
Io's best friend and partner-in-crime. Together with Mayoi, he forms a prankster duo in the friendship circle. Like Mayoi, Sakaki is also a frequent victim of slapstick, but normally by pure accident rather than karmic backlash. His sister owns a patisserie where he, Hime, and Io also work.

=== Other characters ===
Kikue Sakuragawa (桜川 キクヱ, Sakuragawa Kikue)
Voiced by: Mika Kanai (Drama CD), Junko Iwao (Anime)
A clumsy and insecure teacher who wants a boyfriend, but is often depressed about it. She is close friends with Miiko.
Miiko Inui (戌井 みいこ, Inui Miiko)
Voiced by: Yūko Minaguchi
The cheerful owner of a cake shop named Hatch Potch (ハチポチ, Hachi Pochi) and Sakaki's adult sister. She becomes one of Io's weaknesses as he cannot refuse an earnest request from her. Miiko is also a close friend to Kikue.
Saki Sakimori (崎守 咲, Sakimori Saki)
Voiced by: Houko Kuwashima (Drama CD), Natsumi Takamori (Anime)
Saki is a schoolgirl who likes to tease Kyōya, the boy unaware of his crush on her.
Kana Miyama (深山 佳奈, Miyama Kana)
Voiced by: Yukari Tamura (Drama CD), Hiromi Konno (Anime)
Kana is a cheerful and spontaneous schoolgirl who is close to Saki.
Kyōya Saibara (西原 京谷, Saibara Kyōya)
Voiced by: Atsushi Abe (Drama CD), Tsubasa Yonaga (Anime)
Kyōya is a student who is in love with Saki, and he acts in a tsundere attitude around her or whenever someone mentions his crush on her.
Ami Kirino (桐野 亜美, Kirino Ami)
Voiced by: Ayana Taketatsu (Drama CD), Marie Miyake (Anime)
Ami is the energetic member of the Broadcast Committee which operates the school radio.

== Media ==
=== Manga ===
No.	Release date	ISBN
1	October 27, 2007	978-4-8322-7659-8
2	December 25, 2008	978-4-8322-7763-2
3	March 27, 2010	978-4-8322-7899-8
4	July 27, 2011	978-4-8322-4047-6
5	July 26, 2012	978-4-8322-4171-8
6	September 27, 2014	978-4-8322-4482-5
7	January 27, 2017	978-4-8322-4795-6
8	November 27, 2019	978-4-8322-7135-7
9	September 27, 2022	978-4-8322-7397-9
10	March 27, 2025	978-4-8322-9624-4

=== Anime ===
An anime television series created by AIC aired between April 5 and June 28, 2012. It was originally announced in December 2011 via the January issue of Hobunsha's Manga Time Kirara magazine. The series ran for 12 episodes and an extra thirteenth was released on November 16, 2012, with the sixth Blu-ray Disc and DVD volumes in Japan. The opening theme is "Atchi de Kotchi de" (あっちでこっちで; Here and There) by Rumi Ōkubo, Nobuhiko Okamoto, Hitomi Nabatame, Kaori Fukuhara, and Shintarō Asanuma, whilst the ending theme is "Te o Gyu Shite ne" (手をギュしてね; Squeeze My Hand Tight) by Ōkubo. Sentai Filmworks released the series on DVD in North America on April 16, 2013.

No.	Title	Original release date
1	"Place to Place" "Atchi Kotchi" (あっち⇔こっち)	April 5, 2012
On a cold winter day, Tsumiki Miniwa joins her close friend – Io Otonashi – to visit the Arcade along their friends Mayoi Katase, Hime Haruno, and Sakaki Inui.
2	"Delicious Cakes/Valentine Lip" "Oishii Kēki to/Barentain Rippu" (美味しいケーキと⇔ばれんたいんリップ)	April 12, 2012
Delicious Cakes: The group pays a visit to Sakaki's older sister Miiko's Cake Shop, the Hatch Potch, where Io and Sakaki work. Valentine Lip: Tsumiki, Mayoi, and Hime assemble to make chocolate on Valentine's Day.
3	"Crazy Snowball Fight/Cooking Class (Burn)" "Mujōnaru Yukigassen VS/Chōri Jisshū (Moe)" (無情なる雪合戦VS⇔調理実習（燃）)	April 19, 2012
Crazy Snowball Fight: As winter is about to end, the group divides themselves into two teams and play snowball, but Mayoi and Sakaki have some tricks up their sleeves. Cooking Class (Burn): Being placed a different team than Io, Tsumiki takes the opportunity to show him her culinary skills during the cooking class.
4	"I Want to Catch/Donna Donna of Love" "Tsukamaetai no/Koi no Dona Dona" (つかまえたいの⇔恋のドナドナ)	April 26, 2012
I Want to Catch: Due to a teachers' meeting, afternoon club activities have been cancelled. Mayoi announces a "Kick the Can" game, for which the students are divided into two teams: hiders and seekers with a special penalty for the losing team. Donna Donna of Love: The school radio now turns into a school TV with special guests Io and Sakaki, who have to give advice to problems sent in by girl students.
5	"Attack!/Nyanber Nyan!" "Atakku!/Nyanbā Nyan!" (アタック！⇔にゃんばーにゃん！)	May 3, 2012
Attack!: After the five have discussed some embarrassing details of the physical check-up, they settle on a competitive volleyball match. The losing team has to fight for the most popular lunch items in the school cafeteria. Nyanber Nyan!: The five go on a picnic where they decide to play Frisbee before the meal. Io sits apart from the others playing with the many cats that become friendly with him, much to their admiration.
6	"Pool and Y-Shirt/Homework" "Pūru to Y-Shatsu to/Shukudai" (プールとYシャツと⇔宿題)	May 10, 2012
Pool and Y-Shirt: The students are assigned to clean the swimming pool in summer. Homework: The afternoon before the test, Mayoi suggests a study group meeting in Io's house. Sakaki cannot go because he has a shift in Hatch Potch, so it is Io and the three girls. After the test, the weather turns rainy and there are not enough umbrellas.
7	"It's the Mountains! It's a River!/Barbecue!" "Yama da! Kawa da!/Bābekyū!" (山だ！川だ！⇔バーベキュー！)	May 17, 2012
Although summer homework is still waiting for them to finish, except Io, the five friends decide to take a train trip to a mountain resort. In the Drift race, they race to the mountain resort.
8	"Summer Homework/Summer Festival" "Shukudai no Natsu/Matsuri no Natsu" (宿題の夏⇔祭りの夏)	May 24, 2012
Summer Homework: Tsumiki, Haru, and Mayoi decide to visit Io's place as Tsumiki's air conditioner is broken. However, Mayoi and Sakaki are still held by the task of finishing up their homework, and urges the others to not worry about them and have some fun by themselves, despite their behavior saying otherwise. Summer Festival: The group attends the summer festival together, facing several humorous situations as they try some of its attractions.
9	"Dress Me Up!/The School Festival of Love and Romance" "Watashi o Tsutsunde!/Koi to Roman no Gakuensai" (ワタシを包んで！⇔恋とロマンの学園祭)	May 31, 2012
The group goes to the crêpe stand on School Festival, which turns out perfectly. Io not only becomes the cook but also sews Tsumiki's mascot uniform by hand, and promises the first crêpe to her. Mayoi wears no lab coat over her waitress uniform.
10	"Bear Encounter/Lovelymas" "Kuma Enkaunto/Raburimasu" (くまエンカウント⇔ラブリマス)	June 7, 2012
Bear Encounter: Mayoi buys a bear costume for cheap and decides to put it to use by scaring as many people as she can. Lovelymas: Mayoi is planning to have a party on Christmas Eve but has to put it off to Christmas Day as Hime and Io promised to work in Hatch Potch. She and Tsumiki also stand in to help Io sell Christmas cakes in front of the shop.
11	"I Look Forward to You This Year/Rice Cake Game" "Kotoshi mo Yoroshiku/Motchī Gēmu" (今年もよろしく⇔もっちーげーむ)	June 21, 2012
I Look Forward to You This Year: group celebrates New Year's Day, after which they come together at the Inui family's place, where their teacher Kikue Sakuragawa – who seems to be Miiko's friend – is also present. Everyone talks about New Year's resolutions and play games before having a meal. Rice Cake Game: Due to a flu epidemic, more than half the class is absent, school finishes after lunch. Tsumiki and Io seem to have a "moment" which leaves Io rather confused and flustered.
12	"Sweet Gem/Chocolate Baritude" "Amai Hōseki/Choko Bāritūdo" (甘い宝石⇔チョコバーリトゥード)	June 28, 2012
Sweet Gem: Tsumiki, Hime, and Mayoi decide to make some chocolate on Valentine's Day again, but the former forgot the chocolate she wanted to give to Io. Everybody was having fun trading chocolate except Tsumiki. After school, Tsumiki returns home to get the chocolate, but it got wet on the way back and Io arrives with his umbrella to protect her from the rain. Even when the chocolate were all wet, Io still accepted them. Chocolate Baritude: Io, Sakaki, and Tsumiki decide to make chocolate marshmallow, white chocolate cookies, gem sweets as return for the chocolates on Valentine's Day. Sakaki has secretly made some pig feet marshmallows as revenge for Mayoi's frog-flesh chocolate. At the end, Io and Tsumiki talked about the Tsumiki's cat-shaped gem sweetbox that Io has specially made for her.
OVA	"Place = Princess"	November 16, 2012
Place: After a strange shared dream in a JRPG world, the gang goes to an ice skating rink. Io, Hime, and Sakaki are experienced skaters, but the rest are not, and Mayoi falls flat on her face. Io teaches Tsumiki to skate well that she chases Mayoi, with Sakaki making fun of her. Later, Mayoi stumbles into Io who ends up punching Sakaki in the face. Princess: Tsumiki hears fortune advice over the radio to take the initiative. She goes to find Io at the train station and grabs his hand and puts it on her head. As the group ends up talking about fortunes, Miyama borrows Io's glasses for good luck at the vending machine, making Tsumiki blush. Miyama ends up with a lot of soda before they flip through a love compatibility horoscope. Io and Tsumiki get "good compatibility", but Io says he would rather follow his heart than listen to his horoscope. After some advice from Sakaki, he admits that he doesn't mind getting "good compatibility" with Tsumiki.

=== Video game ===
Characters from the series appear alongside other Manga Time Kirara ones in the 2020 mobile role-playing game, Kirara Fantasia.
