= Change 123 =

Japanese manga series

- Cover of Change 123 volume 1 as published Akita Shoten

ちぇんじ123 (Chenji Hi-Fu-Mi)
- Manga
- Written by: Iku Sakaguchi
- Illustrated by: Shiuri Iwasawa
- Published by: Akita Shoten
- Magazine: Champion Red
- Original run: June 2005 – June 2010
- Volumes: 12
- icon

Change 123 (ちぇんじ123, Chenji Hi-Fu-Mi) is a Japanese manga series written by Iku Sakaguchi and illustrated by Shiuri Iwasawa. The story follows Motoko Gettou, a normal female high school student, with a not so normal secret. When she was a child she was trained by her three martial artist fathers. Subjected to excessive physical and mental training, Motoko developed three distinct personalities (often called 'alters') known as Hibiki, Fujiko, and Mikiri. Collectively they refer to themselves as HiFuMi. Each individually skilled gained a mastery in combat skills learned from each of her fathers. As Motoko tries to live a normal high-school life she only seems to find herself in the most awkward situations, courtesy of HiFuMi.

== Plot ==
Change 123 follows Kosukegawa Teruharu, a justice-loving fan of Kamen Raider (a parody of Kamen Rider) and Gettou Motoko, a teenage girl with dissociative identity disorder. Orphaned at an early age after the death of her mother, she was taken in by her three fathers, each of whom is a master of a certain style of martial arts or combat-training. Under the care of each parent, Motoko's childhood was subjected to excessively rigorous training, straining her to the point that she developed three alters, Hibiki, Fujiko, and Mikiri, colloquially known as HiFuMi. Each alter is individually skilled in combat skills learned from each master, thus also shaping their personalities. Kosukegawa happens to witness Hibiki ruthlessly kick a perverted man when a shocked Motoko promises Kosukegawa she will do anything if he doesn't reveal her secret. They quickly become friends and Kosukegawa develops romantic feelings for all of HiFuMi's alters, and vice versa. However, Motoko feels that something must be done with the alters as her seemingly unconscious acts of violence cannot be continued, thus she and Kosukegawa set off to supposedly rid of her dormant anger and fuse her alters into one being.

== Release ==
Change 123 was published in Akita Shoten's seinen magazine Champion Red from June 2005 to June 2010. A total of 12 tankōbon chapter-collection volumes were published in Japan from September 20, 2005, to July 5, 2010. In addition, a drama CD based on the manga has been released.

== Reception ==
The manga received a mixed reception: Animeland regretted an over-reliance on fan service and stereotypes, but praised Shiuri Iwasawa's art. Planete BD rated most volumes "good" or "average", saying that the manga's main appeal was its humour and atmosphere rather than its scenario, while praising action scenes, but regretting bad quality impression and paper from the editor.
