= List of Tantei Opera Milky Holmes characters =

This is a list of characters who appear in Bushiroad's Tantei Opera Milky Holmes franchise. The series, which takes place in the Great Detective Era where both detectives and thieves use special powers known as Toys to battle against each other, follows four young girls who form the Milky Holmes detective agency. Many of the characters are named after characters from various detective novels.

== Characters introduced in Tantei Opera Milky Holmes ==
=== Milky Holmes ===
Sherlock "Sheryl" Shellingford (シャーロック・シェリンフォード, Shārokku Sherinfōdo)
Voiced by: Suzuko Mimori
The main protagonist of the series. Sherlock is the airheaded leader of Milky Holmes, who, while known to be particularly clumsy yet is always also caring and loyal, excitable and friendly. She has a habit of randomly choosing culprits without much basis, most often Buta. Occasionally, she works part-time in a ramen shop as a waitress. Her Toys give her the power of telekinesis.
Nero Yuzurizaki (譲崎 ネロ, Yuzurizaki Nero)
Voiced by: Sora Tokui
An obnoxious girl with a hefty appetite. She speaks with the masculine term 'boku' and is very selfish, often talking down on others while comforting her own greed. Her Toys allows her to control machines using a small piece of metal.
Hercule "Elly" Burton (エルキュール・バートン, Erukyūru Bāton)
Voiced by: Mikoi Sasaki
A very shy girl who is easily embarrassed. She often tries to be the voice of reason, but her timid nature means she's often ignored and yelled at afterward. She occasionally works as a model. Her Toys gives her superhuman strength.
Cordelia Glauca (コーデリア・グラウカ, Kōderia Gurauka)
Voiced by: Izumi Kitta
A blonde girl who often gets delusional concerning the relationship within the group. She tends to get rather out of control whenever she is scared, particularly of the dark. Her Toys allows her to see and hear things others cannot.

=== Thieves' Empire ===
Henriette Mystère (アンリエット・ミステール, Anrietto Misutēru) / Arsène (アルセーヌ, Arusēnu)
Voiced by: Satomi Akesaka
The well-endowed leader of the Gentlemen Thieves whose Toys can cast illusions. She is currently undercover as the Student Council President at Holmes's Academy. She craves strong opponents such as Sherlock to fight against, so when Milky Holmes lose their Toys, she strives to help them to return to their most powerful states so they can satisfy her. It is well implied that her team mates have a crush on her. When not in her school uniform, she generally wears outfits that show off her chest.
Souseki Ishinagare (石流 漱石, Ishinagare Sōseki) / Stone River (ストーンリバー, Sutōn Ribā)
Voiced by: Takuma Terashima
A stern man who battles with a katana. His Toys allow him to immobilize an opponent. Works undercover at Holmes Detective Academy as a school janitor or chef.
Kai Nijuuri (二十里 海, Nijuuri Kai) / Twenty (トゥエンティ, Tuenti)
Voiced by: Daisuke Kishio
A crafty magician who uses various English words and attacks using cards. He is wildly perverted and constantly shows off his erect nipples to the chagrin of the students. His Toys allows him to disguise himself perfectly. Undercover as a teacher, his name is based after Edogawa Rampo's Fiend of Twenty Faces.
Jiro Nezu (根津 次郎, Nezu Jiro) / Rat (ラット, Ratto)
Voiced by: Hiro Shimono
A young boy with a Flame Toy used for lighting various explosives. Undercover as a classmate.

=== Genius 4 ===
Kokoro Akechi (明智 小衣, Akechi Kokoro)
Voiced by: Yoshino Nanjō
The leader of Genius 4 (known as G4 for short), a police investigation unit. She is a bossy girl who looks down on Milky Holmes since they lost their Toys and always claims to boast a massive IQ. A running gag involves her smacking Sherlock with a golden mask whenever she calls her "Kokoro-chan". She claims to have graduated from Harvard University at the age of 13.
Tsugiko Zenigata (銭形 次子, Zenigata Tsugiko)
Voiced by: Miyuki Sawashiro
A spunky green haired girl.
Hirano Hasegawa (長谷川 平乃, Hasegawa Hirano)
Voiced by: Ryōko Shintani
A polite girl who can deal a sleep-inducing karate chop.
Saku Tōyama (遠山 咲, Tōyama Saku)
Voiced by: Yukari Tamura
A soft spoken girl who wears headphones. She loves retro technology and is almost always seen with a lollipop in her mouth.

=== Recurring characters ===
Kamaboko (かまぼこ, Kamaboko (lit. Fish Paste))
Voiced by: Hiro Shimono
A stray cat the girls find and keep inside the attic.
Buta (ブー太, Būta)
Voiced by: Shintarō Ōhata as Buta, Rikiya Koyama as God of Lard
A fat, pig-like boy who is obsessed with eating lard and is often wrongly accused by Milky Holmes of being a culprit. He renamed himself as God of Lard when he ends up gaining powers from the Toys that Sherlock Holmes had sealed away, he steals all the lard from the city, using it to change into a more powerful and handsome form
Irene Doala (アイリーン・ドアラー, Airīn Doarā)
Voiced by: Sayuri Yahagi
A young but wily girl who likes Kokoro and often kidnaps her for her own desires and plans to help her businessman father.
Irene's Father (アイリーンの父, Airīn no Chichi)
Voiced by: Shunzō Miyasaka
Irene's businessman father whose business ventures and get-rich-quick schemes often fail and go bankrupt.
Sonia Kurusu (来栖 ソニア, Kurusu Sonia)
Voiced by: Azusa Kataoka
Sheryl's kouhai who frames the Milky Holmes on the 'death' of Nezu in order to help them get their Toys back. After being found guilty, she is transferred to Poirot Detective Academy in London. Her Toys are closely related to Sheryl's Telekinesis Toys.
Ramen Shopkeeper (らめえん屋の店主, Rameen-ya no Tenshu)
The owner of a ramen shop where Sheryl sometimes works part-time. He never speaks but communicates with the text written on the back of his shirt.
Mori Arty (森・アーティ, Mori Āti)
Voiced by: Motoki Takagi
A mysterious transfer student with a feminine appearance but masculine voice.
Cherry the Artist (チェリー画伯, Cherī-gahaku)
Voiced by: Chō
An eccentric, red-haired artist who sometimes employs Elly as a part-time model for his class. He describes his own art as 'explosive'.
Poporo Mk-II (ポポロMk-II, Poporo Māku-Tsū)
Voiced by: Yoshino Nanjō
A bomb disposal robot which is similar in appearance to Wall-E. It copies Kokoro's mannerisms and has its own Mask of Agamemnon, which it uses to hit Sheryl and Kokoro herself. Its name is based on Kokoro's hand puppet named Poporo.

=== Minor characters ===
Mary (メアリー, Mearī) and Kate (ケイト, Keito)
Voiced by: Mai Nakahara and Yū Kobayashi
A pair of thieves who kidnaps and plots to torture Kamaboko due to his resemblance to their old boyfriend.
Princess Claris (クラリス王女, Kurarisu-ōjo)
Voiced by: Ai Nonaka
The Princess of Marlo who bears a striking resemblance to Sheryl. She is arranged to be married to Prince Pero in order to support her country but yearns to be a normal girl.
Prince Pero (ペロ・グーリ王子, Pero Gūri-ōji)
Voiced by: Katsuyuki Konishi
The Prince of Ripa who is a masochist with a catgirl maid fetish. He is in love with Claris' Grandmother, whom he eventually marries.
Koboten (こぼ天, Koboten)
Voiced by: Takuma Terashima
A rooster the girls found while working on their farm. He is killed in the aftermath of the second season premiere and later eaten by the Milky Holmes in the next episode.
Arthur Conan Drill (アーサー・コナン・ドリル, Āsā Konan Doriru)
Voiced by: Nobuo Tobita
A wealthy old man who has lost contact his first love Higatha in an accident 80 years ago. He offers the Milky Holmes ¥10,000,000 and one thousand pieces of first-class sushi for an abstract painting Elly got from her part-time job which resembles Higatha.
Higatha Christie (ヒガサ・クリスティー, Higasa Kurisutī)
Voiced by: Hitomi Nabatame
Drill's first love who always wears a mask because of her shyness. She is separated from Drill after an accident 80 years ago but eventually returns and reunites with him after receiving a clue of his whereabouts.
Sushi Boss (寿司屋の大将, Sushi-ya no Taishō)
Voiced by: Tsuyoshi Aoki
A dark-skinned man with an afro who works in a sushi shop while saving up for his daughter (Voiced by: Natsumi Takamori) who needs a surgery which costs ¥9,990,000. In the end, he receives the Milky Holmes' check which completely covers the operation.
Prison Warden (所長, Shochou)
Voiced by: Kenta Miyake
A manly, giant octopus riding prison warden of Hakkei-jima Sea Prison (ハッケイ島シープリズン, Hakkei-jima Shī Purizun) who enjoys tormenting and crushing the hopes of his prisoners. His prison is destroyed by the Milky Holmes while they are trying to escape.
Coron (コロン, Koron)
Voiced by: Yuki Matsuoka
A detective from Osaka who gets the Milky Holmes to help her find a flasher. She has a split personality named Pō (ポー, Pō) who wants to experience the freedom of being naked.
The Flasher (変質者, Henshitsusha)
Voiced by: Shinji Kawada
A flasher wearing a long coat who frequently exposes himself to young girls. He is apprehended by the Genius Four although he is later seen free again.
Train Conductor (車掌, Shashō)
Voiced by: Tsuyoshi Aoki
A train conductor who is a fan of Kokoro and planted a bomb in The Great Detective of Kamakura (カマクラ大探偵, Kamakura Dai-Tantei) in order to meet her.
Haruko Minami (ミナミ ハルコ, Minami Haruko)
Voiced by: Masako Katsuki, Singing voice: Chihiro Yonekura
A singer who was kidnapped in a case, which is stolen by the Milky Holmes, posing as the Thieves' Empire, from the actual thieves. Her debut song is the main theme of the Yokohama Detective Fair. She has a child-looking manager (Voiced by: Rina Hidaka) who is actually 28 years old.

== Characters introduced in Futari wa Milky Holmes ==
=== Feathers ===
A pair of detectives who are the protagonists of the third anime season, Futari wa Milky Holmes.

Kazumi Tokiwa (常盤 カズミ, Tokiwa Kazumi)
Voiced by: Aimi
The main protagonist of Futari wa Milky Holmes and Alice's partner in Feathers. Her Toys lets her produce a bow and arrow out of light which, when combined with Alice's barrier Toys, become more powerful.
Alice Myojingawa (明神川 アリス, Myojingawa Arisu)
Voiced by: Ayasa Itō
One half of Feathers who, unlike Kazumi, is not a student at Holmes Detective Academy. Her Toys give her the ability to produce barriers. Unbeknownst to her, her family comes from a line of gentleman thieves.

=== Color the Phantom ===
An antagonist group who appears in Futari wa Milky Holmes.

Shion Myojingawa (明神川 シオン, Myojingawa Shion) / Violet Shadow (バイオレット・シャドウ, Baioretto Shadō)
Voiced by: Kazuyuki Okitsu
Alice's older brother, who is secretly the leader of Color the Phantom. He often worries about Alice becoming a detective.
Keiko Totsugawa (十津川 警子, Totsugawa Keiko) / Pink Lovely Doom (麗しき破滅の桃, Uruwashiki Hametsu no Momo)
Voiced by: Ikumi Nakagami
Kokoro's police partner, who is secretly the group's real mastermind. Her Toys cause people to forget things about her, which she constantly uses to keep her identity secret.
Great White Fallen Angel (偉大な白き堕天使, Idaina Shiroki Datenshi) and Darkside Revolution (ダークサイドレボリューション, Dākusaido Reboryūshon)
Voiced by: Yuka Ōtsubo and Yuka Takakura
The white and black phantoms who assist Shion by collecting data.
Red Lion of the Gale (疾風の赤き獅子, Hayate no Akakishishi)
Voiced by: Taishi Murata
A cocky phantom thief whose Toys let him use a whip.
Ryōko Komatsu (リョウコ・コマツ) / Yellow Black Hole (イエロー・ブラックホール, Ierō Burakku Hōru)
Voiced by: Aya Hisakawa
A female detective who is actually a phantom thief, constantly trying to bring Alice to the side of the phantom thieves. Her Toys allow her to create black holes anywhere using a GPS device.
The Fearsome Blue Hunter (戦慄なる青き狩人, Senritsunaru Aoki Kariudo)
Voiced by: Tōru Ōkawa
A phantom thief who appears in the public eye as a news critic. His Toys allow him to create holographic duplicates of himself to confuse his opponents.

=== Other characters ===
Visconte (ビスコンテ, Bisukonte)
Voiced by: Hiroki Tōchi
Alice's father, who is secretly a legendary thief who has returned to action after ten years.
Madame Visconte (マダム・ビスコンテ, Madamu Bisukonte)
Voiced by: Sayaka Ohara
Alice's mother, who is also Visconte's partner.
Kazumi's Father (カズミの父, Kazumi no Chichi)
Voiced by: Kenji Hamada
He, alongside Kazumi's Mother are both former detectives but still work in a detective agency.
La Lunar (ラ・ルナール, La Runāru)
Voiced by: Ikumi Hayama
A female thief whose Deception Toys allows others to perceive her as different people.
Monseur Miller (ムッシュ・ミラー, Musshu Mirā)
Voiced by: Kenichi Ogata
A French thief whose Mirror Toys allows him to make duplicates of himself out of mirrors.
Old Lady (老婦人, Ryōfujin)
Voiced by: Kiyoko Miyazawa
An old lady who seems to come to the same bar and ride the same bus every day. The bus driver (Voiced by: Ryōsuke Kanemoto) is actually her estranged son who she was working up the courage to talk to.

== Characters introduced in Tantei Kageki Milky Holmes TD ==
=== Idols ===
Marine Amagi (天城 茉莉音, Amagi Marine)
Voiced by: Emi Nitta
The main protagonist of Tantei Kageki Milky Holmes TD and a popular idol who possesses a miraculous singing voice made up of seven Elements. Her Toys allow her to materialize these Elements for use in her performances. When her Elements are mysteriously stolen, she joins up with Milky Holmes to help recover them.
Miki Hojo (法条 美樹, Hōjō Miki)
Voiced by: Mari Nakatsu
Marine's fellow idol in the group BKT10000.
Producer (プロデューサーさん, Purodyūsā-san)
Voiced by: Ayako Kawasumi
Marine's producer.
Manager (マネージャーさん, Manējā-san)
Voiced by: Ai Yamamoto (ja)
Marine's manager.
Makoto Senda (千田 元子, Senda Makoto)
Voiced by: Ayami Yoshi
A former center of BKT10000 who suddenly quit.

=== Elements ===
The Elements (エレメント, Eremento) are Marine's Toys who help form her miraculous singing voice, who became separated.

Melodia (メロディア, Merodia)
Voiced by: Juri Nagatsuma
The first element. She is found possessing Marine's manager.
Harmony (ハーモニー, Hāmonī)
Voiced by: Chitose Morinaga (Black) and Juri Kimura (White)
Twin sisters. They are found possessing a curry loving prince in India.
Poemy (ポエミィ, Poemi)
Voiced by: Ayami Yoshi

He was found possessing Nero after a short nap on the day after she had an argument with the other members of the Milky Holmes.

Crescendo (クレッシェンド, Kureshendo)
Voiced by: Saori Ōnishi

She was found possessing Scarlet during a trip to rescue Marine and prevent Scarlet from taking the priceless gem from the sky casino. She was forced to break the bond between Scarlet and herself after Miki used her toys.

Decrescendo (デクレッシェンド, Dekureshendo)
Voiced by: Shiro Izawa

She was found possessing a dealer Noir during a trip to the Scarlet's newly opened casino.

Shout (シャウト, Shauto)
Voiced by: Minami Takahashi

She was found possessing Sakiko Kirumiya, who was a one-hit-wonder idol.

Dancing (ダンシング, Danshingu)
Voiced by: Hayase Marika

He Marima is then revealed to be possessed by another Element, Dancing, who challenges Milky Holmes to see who can best imitate a good-looking man, which Hercule manages to win due to having a sore throat.

Rhythmic (リズミック, Rizumikku)
Voiced by: Yurika Kubo
Amoore (アモーレ, Amoore)
Voiced by: Kikuko Inoue

=== Other characters ===
Nobles (ノブレス, Noburesu)
Voiced by: Masumi Tazawa

== Characters introduced in the PSP Visual Novel Games ==
Opera Kobayashi (小林 オペラ, Kobayashi Opera)
Voiced by: Shuta Morishima
The main protagonist of the first PSP game who also appears in the Alternative specials. He is said to be the person who trained Milky Holmes. His name is based after Yoshio Kobayashi. In the PSP game, he lost his Toys.
Rei Kamitsu (神津 玲, Kamitsu Rei)
Voiced by: Susumu Chiba
The head of G4. His name is based on Kyōsuke Kamitsu.
Ellery Himeyuri (エラリー・姫百合, Erarī Himeyuri)
Voiced by: Natsumi Takamori
The main protagonist of the second PSP game who also appears in episode 8 of Futari wa Milky Holmes. Formerly a police officer who suddenly gained Toys, she was put in charge of Milky Holmes. Her Induction Toys allow her to mimic the abilities of other people's Toys and use them to their full extent.
Josephine Mystère (ジョセフィーヌ・ミステール, Josafīnu Misutēru) / Cagliostro (カリオストロ, Kariosutoro)
Voiced by: Asami Sanada
Henriette's older sister who appears in the 2nd PSP game. During the game, she acts as student council president and assigns Ellery to be in charge of Milky Holmes.

== Characters introduced in Tantei Opera Milky Holmes Alternative ==
Lily Adler (リリー・アドラー, Rirī Adorā)
Voiced by: Kana Asumi
A girl who appears in the Alternate episodes. Her Toys allow her to manipulate ice.
Hartley Queen (ハートリー・クイーン, Hātorī Kuīn)
Voiced by: Mai Nakahara
A police inspector for Scotland Yard.
Kitty Evans (キティ・エバンズ, Kiti Evansu)
Voiced by: Harumi Sakurai
A female thief from America. Her Toys allow her to be invisible which she uses to steal paintings. She loses her memory after being hit by Edgar Moran's Toys.
Edgar Moran (エドガー・モラン, Edogā Moran)
Voiced by: Shinji Ogawa
A colonel whose Toys can erase someone's memories.
