= Franken Fran =

Japanese manga series

- Cover of the first volume featuring the eponymous Fran Madaraki

フランケン・ふらん (Furanken Furan)
- Genre: Body horror, parody, supernatural
- Manga
- Written by: Katsuhisa Kigitsu
- Published by: Akita Shoten
- English publisher: NA: Seven Seas
- Magazine: Champion Red
- Original run: September 2006 – February 2012
- Volumes: 8
- Manga

Franken Fran Frantic
- Written by: Katsuhisa Kigitsu
- Published by: Akita Shoten
- Magazine: Champion Red
- Original run: February 19, 2019 – present
- Volumes: 12

Franken Fran (フランケン・ふらん, Furanken Furan) is a Japanese horror-comedy manga series written and illustrated by Katsuhisa Kigitsu. It was serialized in Champion Red from September 2006 to February 2012 and has been compiled into 8 tankōbon volumes by Akita Shoten. Seven Seas Entertainment licensed the series for publication in North America.

A sequel series, Franken Fran Frantic, began on February 19, 2019, and is currently ongoing.

== Synopsis ==
In the aftermath of World War II, Dr. Naomitsu Madaraki became the world's most infamous biomedicist, developing techniques and technologies that could raise the dead. When he mysteriously disappears, his home and work are taken over by his "daughter" Fran, an artificial girl (superficially designed after the popular image of Frankenstein's monster) imbued with his genius and his uncompromising drive to preserve human life at all costs.

After the disappearance of surgeon Dr. Naomitsu Madaraki, his artificial daughter, Fran, continues his medical research and surgical work at their residence in rural Japan. Fran treats patients seeking various medical procedures, including cosmetic surgery and resurrection. Although she attempts to preserve human life, her experimental treatments frequently result in unintended physical transformations or other harmful consequences.

The manga follows an episodic structure, with individual chapters generally focusing on different patients and their encounters with Fran. The stories combine elements of body horror and dark comedy.

Overall, the series is strongly episodic, a typical chapter being a standalone "monkey's paw" story where a new character tries to gain strength, popularity, wealth etc. through Fran's radical treatments, only to be gruesomely injured, mutated or worse by the unpredictable side-effects. These cases are inevitably played for dark humor (as Fran is often blithely unaware of the negative results, or satisfied with a patient merely being alive regardless of quality of life) as well as satire on the societal obsessions and hypocrisies that led to Fran being sought in the first place.

Though recurring characters outside the main cast do exist, multi-chapter story arcs are practically nonexistent. Even chapters explicitly framed as sequels to prior stories (more common in Frantic) will often retcon various details, circumstances, and character motivations.

== Characters ==
Fran Madaraki (斑木 ふらん, Madaraki Furan)

The protagonist of the manga, Fran lives at the Madaraki estate. Though she is often mistaken for Naomitsu Madaraki's daughter, she is actually his greatest "masterpiece." She is fitted with two sizable bolts upon her temples and marred with faint stitches, giving her a distinctly inhuman appearance. She has a unique view of morality, finding certain cases emotionally moving and experimenting out of the goodness of her heart.

While most often aloof, she has shown that she is aware that her actions ruin lives, and is very capable of using her talents to punish others, should they seriously offend her or hurt others, such is the case with a group of spies sent to steal her and Dr. Amatsuka's secrets and research. Fran is able to make her clients' dreams come true and very often their nightmares as well - the consequences of her actions are extraordinary. Even so, Fran carries on without a concern.

Though Fran is usually completely analytical and logical in her approach to cases, prioritizing the advancement of science and medicine for the overall benefit of humanity over traditional moral values, she has a soft spot for cases involving romantic affection.

During surgery, she is able to increase the number of her arms and operate at a greater speed. Her one oath is to never take life, believing that "regardless of the shape or form, if it can function as a living organism, it is good."

Veronica Madaraki (斑木ヴェロニカ, Madaraki Veronika)

Veronica is a bio-weapon assassin crafted by Dr. Madaraki for his own protection. As such, she is notably violent, though bound to a humane battle etiquette and creed: "to murder while causing as little suffering as possible" and "rather a painless death than a painful life." In addition to her naturally high combat ability, she is trained in the handling of explosives and the setting of traps in the field. Wielding a huge guillotine blade in her right arm and a sharp sword in her left, she also appears to have needles on the ends of her fingertips which allow her to inject viruses into her victims. She has an X-shaped stitching across her face and a fairly benign, young appearance.

Although her first appearance is as somewhat of an antagonist, she quickly joins Fran at her home and resumes her guard duties with Fran as a charge. She does not hesitate to eliminate anything that threatens the estate, though is usually rebuffed. As she was created after Fran, Veronica regards her as an older sister, calling her "onee-sama".

Gavrill Madaraki (斑木ガブリール, Madaraki Gaburiru)

Fran's and Veronica's older sister and one of Naomitsu's earliest and most dangerous projects. Gavrill has the appearance of a woman in her twenties or late teens with wild, unkempt violet hair, a line of stitching going across the bridge of her nose, and black leather clothing adorned with various arm and leg braces she presumably wears as accessories. She is what Fran calls a "Transformer", the entirety of her skeletal, muscular, organ, and nervous systems being partitioned into many smaller divisions so that she can consciously control them, granting her shapeshifting capabilities as well as a formidable regenerative healing factor. This suits her incredibly violent, often self-serving needs; her primary combat form being a humanoid wolf (giving her the nickname "Gavrill the Wolf"). However, Fran says that transformations require a great amount of willpower. As a result, the Professor has abandoned the practice due to the danger that comes with it if the subject's will is not strong enough.

She, too, is introduced as an antagonist, casually mutilating Veronica in an attempt to lure Fran. Despite her foul-mouthed and exceptionally violent behavior, she is loyal to Dr. Amatsuka, vowing to murder all of his attackers and proves to be a surprisingly adept confidant during her tenure of teaching at Fran's school on Amatsuka's request. Her hatred towards Dr. Madaraki and her "sisters" may stem from his abandoning the Transformer practice, abandoning her in turn.

In Franken Fran Frantic, it is implied that Gavrill had been going to Dr. Amatsuka for her body tunings due to her legitimately caring for his company and well-being, despite her vulgar and insulting language towards him.

Dr. Naomitsu Madaraki (斑木尚允, Madaraki Naomistu)

The creator of Fran and her "siblings". An unseen character, he owns the mansion that Fran lives in but has not lived there for a long time.

During the second World War, Naomitsu worked for the Biochemistry Division, earning fame and the moniker of "Devil of Biology" and "Spider's Thread" due to the nature of his experiments. He is considered a top-class thinker in the field of biotechnology. Given his service in the war, he is presumed to be quite old, constantly traveling the world for the sake of his research. His current whereabouts are unknown to Fran.

Dr. Madaraki defines World War II to be "a war to kill the gods" because of its promotion of scientific development and the erosion of religion accompanied by it.

Dr. Amatsuka (天使-先生, Amatsuka)

A friend of Madaraki's since the days of the old Japanese Empire, his various achievements have earned him the title of Viscount in England. He has an open bet with Madaraki on the existence of God. Amatsuka is also the one responsible for Gavrill's check-ups in order to keep her superhuman abilities stable. Fran is shown to hold a great deal of reverence towards Amatsuka and his contributions to humanity, and even Gavrill appears to show some respect for him despite the fact that Gavrill constantly badmouths him for his age and his cautionary warnings towards her. He is later assaulted by a group of agents who are hired by corrupt politicians. However, Fran is able to save his life with immediate treatment. When Gavrill finds out that Amatsuka was attacked, she vows revenge against the politicians responsible.

Rumiko Kuhou (久宝るみ子, Kuhou Rumiko)

A bespectacled female investigator who has the occasional interaction with the Madarakis, much to her terror. She first meets Fran in order to get help in tracking down a possible murderer; the second she undergoes surgery in order to heighten her senses and eliminate the clones of one of Fran's previous experiments, though this may be a stress-induced nightmare following her interaction with Fran.

After isolating Gavrill on an island, Rumiko was cloned and genetically coded to undergo a form of mitosis, creating an endless force. She is also used as a base for Fran's artificial humans and was constantly cloned. She had also attracted a rich island owner, Matsumae Tadashi.

Okita (沖田, Okita)

One of Fran's engineered companions, Okita has the head of a handsome young man with the body of a cat. He works along with Fran, supporting or making fun of her. Outside of the estate, his head is grafted onto a human body, taking the guise of a perfectly normal adult man. He is sometimes bewildered by Fran, but in general he supervises her actions in silence. He most often serves as the voice of reason amongst the group.

Adorea (アドレア, Adorea)

Another of Fran's companions, she serves as a flexible reserve of organs. Stock is collected through her "face", which when not concealed with her full-body bandaging, is nothing more than hundreds of tentacles used to tear and collect reagents from the patient before death, keeping them fresh and viable. They are accessible via zippers in her skin.

Her origin is revealed in an extra chapter; originally a beautiful, though terminally ill girl, she had a handsome lover in a similar condition. Due to their love for each other, they agreed to give each other their organs upon death, so that the other could live, but the man went back on his word, and took all of Adorea's organs for himself. Dr. Naomitsu Madaraki, the surgeon in charge at the time, modified Adorea into her present condition so she could reclaim her organs with interest.

== Media ==
=== Manga ===
The series is licensed in English by Seven Seas Entertainment, who announced their plans to release it in four 2-in-1 omnibus volumes starting in February 2016.

==== Volumes ====
No.	Original release date	Original ISBN	English release date	English ISBN
1	November 20, 2007	978-4-253-23311-8	February 16, 2016	978-1-626923-03-4
2	July 18, 2008	978-4-253-23312-5	February 16, 2016	978-1-626923-03-4
3	February 20, 2009	978-4-253-23313-2	May 31, 2016	978-1-626922-3-03
4	October 20, 2009	978-4-253-23314-9	May 31, 2016	978-1-626922-3-03
5	June 18, 2010	978-4-253-23315-6	September 27, 2016	978-1-626923-27-0
6	January 20, 2011	978-4-253-23316-3	September 27, 2016	978-1-626923-27-0
7	August 20, 2011	978-4-253-23317-0	January 17, 2017	978-1-626923-82-9
8	February 20, 2012	978-4-253-23318-7	January 17, 2017	978-1-626923-82-9

=== Audio drama ===
==== Track listing ====
1. "Prologue" (プロローグ) - (1:43)
2. "PART1 CHRYSALIS - Islander - " (蟲) - (19:58)
3. "PART2 MY LITTLE SISTER - sister - " (妹) - (13:20)
4. "PART3 LUST" - lust - (肉欲) - (16:40)
5. "Epilogue" (エピローグ) - (2:24)
