= Devilman Grimoire =

Japanese manga series

- First volume cover

デビルマンG (Debiruman G)
- Genre: Action, horror, supernatural
- Manga
- Written by: Go Nagai
- Illustrated by: Rui Takatō
- Published by: Akita Shoten
- English publisher: NA: Seven Seas Entertainment
- Magazine: Champion Red
- Original run: March 19, 2012 – December 19, 2013
- Volumes: 5
- icon

Devilman Grimoire (Japanese: デビルマンG, Hepburn: Debiruman G) is a Japanese manga series written by Go Nagai and illustrated by Rui Takato. It is part of the Devilman franchise created by Nagai. The manga ran in Akita Shoten's Champion Red from March 2012 to December 2013, with its chapters collected in five tankōbon volumes.

In North America, the manga is licensed for English language release by Seven Seas Entertainment.

== Publication ==
Devilman Grimoire is written by Go Nagai and illustrated by Rui Takato. It was serialized in Akita Shoten's Champion Red from March 19, 2012, to December 19, 2013. Akita Shoten collected its chapters in five tankōbon volumes, released from September 20, 2012, to February 20, 2014.

In North America, Seven Seas Entertainment announced the English language release of the manga in January 2017. The five volumes were published between October 31, 2017, and December 31, 2018.

=== Volumes ===
No.	Original release date	Original ISBN	English release date	English ISBN
1	September 20, 2012	978-4-253-23176-3	October 31, 2017	978-1-626925-71-7
2	February 20, 2013	978-4-253-23177-0	February 27, 2018	978-1-626926-70-7
3	June 20, 2013	978-4-253-23178-7	June 26, 2018	978-1-626927-72-8
4	October 18, 2013	978-4-253-23179-4	September 25, 2018	978-1-626928-50-3
5	February 20, 2014	978-4-253-23180-0	December 31, 2018	978-1-626929-43-2
