= Fuan no Tane =

Manga and live-action film series

- The cover of the first volume of Fuan no Tane Plus

不安の種
- Genre: Horror
- Manga
- Written by: Masaaki Nakayama
- Published by: Akita Shoten
- Magazine: Champion Red
- Original run: 2004 – 2005
- Volumes: 3
- Manga

Fuan no Tane Plus
- Written by: Masaaki Nakayama
- Published by: Akita Shoten
- Magazine: Weekly Shōnen Champion
- Original run: 2007 – 2008
- Volumes: 4
- Live-action film
- Directed by: Toshikazu Nagae
- Written by: Toshikazu Nagae
- Released: July 20, 2013
- Manga

Fuan no Tane*
- Written by: Masaaki Nakayama
- Published by: Akita Shoten
- English publisher: NA: Yen Press
- Magazine: Champion Red
- Original run: 2019 – present
- Volumes: 10

Fuan no Tane (不安の種; lit. "Seeds of Anxiety") is a Japanese horror manga series written and illustrated by Masaaki Nakayama. It was adapted into a live-action film released in July 2013.

== Synopsis ==
Fuan no Tane is represented as series of short horror stories with groups of chapters having a similar theme.

== Cast ==
- Anna Ishibashi
- Kenta Suga
- Kōdai Asaka
- Kanji Tsuda
- Shimako Iwai
