= Masami Suzuki =

Japanese voice actress

- 鈴木 真仁
- Born: July 14, 1972 (age 54); Chigasaki, Kanagawa, Japan
- Occupations: Actress; voice actress; singer
- Years active: 1994–present

Masami Suzuki (鈴木 真仁, Suzuki Masami; born July 14, 1972) is a Japanese actress, voice actress, and singer from Chigasaki. She is famous for voice acting roles such as Kaihime/Princess Kai from Samurai Warriors and Warriors Orochi series both from 3 and 4.

== Filmography ==
=== Anime ===
- Akazukin Chacha (1994-1995) – Chacha (debut role)
- Slayers (1995-2009) – Amelia Wil Tesla Seyruun
- Mizuiro Jidai (1996-1997) – Yuuko Kawai
- Lost Universe (1998) – Nina Mercury
- Medabots (1999) – Kikuhime (Samantha), Brass
- Yu-Gi-Oh! Duel Monsters (2000) – Ghost Kotsuzuka and Yugi's mother
- Gate Keepers (2000) – Yukino Hojo
- One Piece (1999-2024) – Apis, Aisa, The Medaka Mermaid Quintuplets, Young Vinsmoke Ichiji, Capone Pez, Cosette, and Charlotte Cinnamon
- Gate Keepers 21 (2002-2003) – Yukino Hojo
- Kakurenbo (2004) – Sorincha
- Legendz (2004) – Mike "Mac" McField
- Shura no Toki (2004) – Tsubura Sanada
- Yu-Gi-Oh! GX (2004-2005) – Sho Marufuji
- Suzuka (2005) – Yuuka Saotome
- Katekyo Hitman Reborn! (2006) – Lal Mirch
- Ghost Hunt (2006-2007) – Ayako Matsuzaki
- Saint October (2007) – Ewan
- Penguin Musume Heart (2008) – Maguro Hōjiro
- Dragon Ball Kai (2014-2015) – Bee
- Shimajiro: A World of Wow! (2017-2018) – Nikki

=== Video games ===
- Yakuza 3 (2009) – Katase
- Samurai Warriors 3 (2009) – Kaihime

=== Drama CD ===
- From Far Away (1999) - Tachiki Noriko
