= Kagaku na Yatsura =

Japanese manga series

- First tankōbon volume cover

カガクなヤツら
- Genre: Risqué comedy; Romantic comedy
- Manga
- Written by: Hideaki Yoshikawa
- Published by: Akita Shoten
- Magazine: Champion Red Ichigo
- Original run: February 5, 2010 – December 5, 2013
- Volumes: 6
- Original video animation
- Directed by: Hiraku Kaneko
- Produced by: Masaru Nagai; Yoshihiro Koyama
- Written by: Katsuhiko Takayama
- Music by: Shigero Yoshida
- Studio: Hoods Entertainment
- Released: February 20, 2013
- Runtime: 25 minutes
- icon

Kagaku na Yatsura (カガクなヤツら; lit. 'Scientific Guys') is a Japanese manga series written and illustrated by Hideaki Yoshikawa. It was serialized in Akita Shoten's seinen manga magazine Champion Red Ichigo from February 2010 to December 2013, with its chapters collected in six tankōbon volumes. An original video animation (OVA), produced by Hoods Entertainment and directed by Hiraku Kaneko, was released in February 2013.

== Story ==
Haruki Komaba accidentally signs up for the school's Technological Science Club and Chemical Science Club at the same time. The two club's heads, Airi Kuze and Ayana Hizuki, become attracted to him and jealous of the other. They constantly compete to outdo the other and try to seduce Haruki so that he will stay in their club exclusively.

== Characters ==
Haruki Komaba (駒場 遥希, Haruki Komaba)
Voiced by: Junji Majima
Haruki is high school boy with two eccentric girl friends. He gets involved in erotic troubles caused by the two as they try to get him to join their respective clubs.
Touko Hizuki (緋月 透子, Touko Hizuki)
Voiced by: Kumi Sakuma
Touko is the older sister of Ayana. She can become invisible at will. She becomes the nurse of the school that Ayana, Airi, and Haruki attend.
Airi Kuze (久世 愛莉, Airi Kuze)
Voiced by: Kana Akutsu
Airi is an eccentric half-cyborg girl and friends with Haruki Komaba. She views Ayana as her rival. She is the head of the Technological Science Club.
Ayana Hizuki (緋月 綾奈, Ayana Hizuki)
Voiced by: Natsumi Takamori
Ayana is a genetic hybrid, the first successful experiment combining human genes with those of a dog. Created in a laboratory by her geneticist mother, she was later entrusted to her aunt's care to live a normal life. She integrates into society by attributing her unique appearance to a rare medical condition. Ayana is the head of the Chemical Science Club.

== Media ==
=== Manga ===
Written and illustrated by Hideaki Yoshikawa, Kagaku na Yatsura was serialized in Akita Shoten's seinen manga magazine Champion Red Ichigo from February 5, 2010, to December 5, 2013. Akita Shoten collected its chapters in six tankōbon volumes, released from March 20, 2011, to February 20, 2014.

==== Volumes ====
No.	Release date	ISBN
1	March 20, 2011	978-4-253-23228-9
2	January 20, 2012	978-4-253-23229-6
3	July 20, 2012	978-4-253-23230-2
4	February 20, 2013	978-4-253-23586-0
5	May 20, 2013	978-4-253-23587-7
6	February 20, 2014	978-4-253-23588-4

=== Original video animation ===
An original video animation (OVA) was bundled with the limited edition of the manga's fourth volume, released on February 20, 2013. It was produced by Hoods Entertainment, directed by Hiraku Kaneko, with screenplay by Katsuhiko Takayama, and character designs by Masaya Nozaki.
