= Natsumi Takamori =

Japanese voice actress

- 高森 奈津美
- Born: February 14, 1987 (age 39); Yamanashi Prefecture, Japan
- Other names: Yuka Kotori; Haruka Omori
- Occupation: Voice actress
- Years active: 2009–present
- Agent: Raccoon Dog
- Height: 160 cm (5 ft 3 in)
- Website: https://www.raccoon-dog.co.jp/talent/r03-takamori.html

Natsumi Takamori (高森 奈津美, Takamori Natsumi; born February 14, 1987) is a Japanese voice actress affiliated with Raccoon Dog. Some of her major roles are Mei Misaki in Another, Miku Maekawa in The Idolmaster Cinderella Girls, Akari Sakura in Jewelpet Twinkle, Nikka Edvardine Katajainen in Brave Witches, Reina Miyama in Pretty Rhythm: Dear My Future, Ellery Himeyuri in Tantei Opera Milky Holmes, Konatsu Toro in Gokujyo, Kome-Kome in Delicious Party Pretty Cure, Hiotan in Denkigai no Honya-san, Misaki Kamiigusa in The Pet Girl of Sakurasou, and Kokoro Shigure/Cure Kyun-Kyun in You and Idol Pretty Cure. She also goes by the name of Yūka Kotorii (小鳥居 夕花, Kotorii Yūka) on adult video games.

== Filmography ==
=== Anime ===
List of voice performances in anime
| Year | Title | Role | Notes | Source |
|---|---|---|---|---|
| 2010 | Jewelpet Twinkle | Akari Sakura | | |
| 2010 | The Legend of the Legendary Heroes | Remil Norths レミル・ノールズ | | |
| 2010 | Mitsudomoe | Higokawa, Kazuya, Takahashi 樋川／かずや／高橋 | | |
| 2010 | Yumeiro Patissiere SP Professional | Child | | |
| 2010 | Fortune Arterial | Kohei Hasekura (child) | | |
| 2011 | Dream Eater Merry | Mei Hoshino | | |
| 2011 | Wish Upon the Pleiades | Subaru | ONA series | |
| 2011 | Nichijou | Ohu, Emi 大胡／エミ | | |
| 2011 | Gintama' | Woman | | |
| 2011 | Sket Dance | Misaki | | |
| 2011 | Deadman Wonderland | Hibana Daida | | |
| 2011 | Nura: Rise of the Yokai Clan: Demon Capital | Expression God, Female 式神／女 | | |
| 2011 | A Dark Rabbit Has Seven Lives | Yuica Kurogane | | |
| 2011 | Phi Brain: Puzzle of God | Kindergartener | | |
| 2011 | Maken-ki! | Yuka Amado | Also Two in 2014 | |
| 2011 | Shakugan no Shana Final | Brigid | | |
| 2012 | 夢想夏郷, 東方 (Touhou Musou Kakyou / A Summer Day's Dream) | Kaguya Houraisan | | |
| 2012 | Tantei Opera Milky Holmes 2nd Act | Female student | | |
| 2012–15 | High School D×D series | Sona Sitri | 3 seasons | |
| 2012 | Bodacious Space Pirates | Sasha Staple | | |
| 2012 | The Familiar of Zero F | Jeanette | | |
| 2012 | Another | Mei Misaki | Also OVA | |
| 2012 | Waiting in the Summer | Employee | | |
| 2012 | Gokujyo | Konatsu Toro | | |
| 2012 | Place to Place | Saki Sakimori | | |
| 2012 | Shirokuma Cafe | Various characters | | |
| 2012 | Pretty Rhythm: Dear My Future | Reina Miyama | | |
| 2012 | Saki Achiga-hen episode of Side-A | Kozue Furuzuka, Tsunoda, others | | |
| 2012–13 | AKB0048 series | Mizuho | | |
| 2012 | Muv-Luv Alternative: Total Eclipse | Phoebe Theodorakis | | |
| 2012 | Lagrange: The Flower of Rin-ne | Reiko Miki | season 2 | |
| 2012 | Tari Tari | Takayoshi Katase 片江利佳 | | |
| 2012 | Upotte!! | Type86S, Girl D | | |
| 2012 | The Ambition of Oda Nobuna | Naotaka Magara | | |
| 2012 | Code Geass: Akito the Exiled | Sarah Danes | OVA | |
| 2012 | Kamisama Kiss | Village girl | | |
| 2012 | Gintama': Enchousen | Shinpachi Shimura (child) | | |
| 2012 | Little Busters! | Female student | | |
| 2012 | B-Daman Fireblast | Mion Aona 御代アオナ | | |
| 2012 | The Pet Girl of Sakurasou | Misaki Kamiigusa | | |
| 2012 | Medaka Box Abnormal | Sakanoue Kake replacement 坂之上替 | | |
| 2012 | Psycho-Pass | Commissa-chan / Nursing Drones コミッサちゃん／看護ドローン | | |
| 2013 | Cuticle Detective Inaba | Hiroshi Inaba (young), others | | |
| 2013–16 | Love Live! School Idol Project | Various characters | | |
| 2013 | Kagaku Na Yatsura | Ayana Hizuki | OVA | |
| 2013 | Jewelpet Happiness | Ayame | | |
| 2013 | The Hentai Prince and the Stony Cat | Morii | | |
| 2013 | Rescue Me! | Yuka Takamura | | |
| 2013 | Rozen Maiden: Zurückspulen | Ms. Saito 斉藤さん | | |
| 2013 | Futari wa Milky Holmes | Ellery Himeyuri | | |
| 2013 | I Couldn't Become a Hero, So I Reluctantly Decided to Get a Job | Lady Simowi | | |
| 2013 | Walkure Romanze | Anne Muller | | |
| 2014–15 | JoJo's Bizarre Adventure: Stardust Crusaders series | Jotaro (young), others | | |
| 2014 | Tenkai Knights | Wakame Kameyama | | |
| 2014 | Monthly Girls' Nozaki-kun | Female student | | |
| 2014 | Magimoji Rurumo | Harulily Walura | | |
| 2014 | Invaders of the Rokujyōma!? | Dark Crimson ダーククリムゾン | | |
| 2014 | Denkigai no Honya-san | Hiotan | | |
| 2014 | Amagi Brilliant Park | Biino Bandou | | |
| 2014 | Yona of the Dawn | Yuri | | |
| 2014 | Psycho-Pass 2 | Commissa コミッサ | | |
| 2015 | The Idolmaster Cinderella Girls series | Miku Maekawa | 2 seasons | |
| 2015 | Tesagure! Bukatsu-mono | Enjoji Yui | | |
| 2015 | Wish Upon the Pleiades | Subaru | TV series | |
| 2016 | Aokana: Four Rhythm Across the Blue | Saki Inui | | |
| 2016 | Onigiri | Mephistopheles | | |
| 2016 | Tanaka-kun Is Always Listless | Miyano | | |
| 2016 | High School Fleet | Maron Yanagiwara | | |
| 2016 | Berserk | Nina | | |
| 2016 | Orange | Azusa Murasaka | | |
| 2016 | D.Gray-man Hallow | Four フォー | | |
| 2016 | Brave Witches | Nikka Edvardine Katajainen | | |
| 2017 | Minami Kamakura High School Girls Cycling Club | Fuyune Kamikura | | |
| 2017–19 | The Idolmaster Cinderella Girls Theater series | Miku Maekawa | 4 seasons | |
| 2017 | Hina Logi ~from Luck & Logic~ | Mahiro Kyobashi | | |
| 2017 | Nora, Princess, and Stray Cat | Patricia of End | | |
| 2017 | Anime-Gataris | Ayame Osaki | | |
| 2018 | Record of Grancrest War | Priscilla Farnese | | |
| 2018–20 | Major 2nd | Izumi Shigeno | | |
| 2018 | Miss Caretaker of Sunohara-sou | Yuzu Yukimoto | | |
| 2019–21 | The Quintessential Quintuplets | Raiha Uesugi | | |
| 2019 | Yubisaki kara no Honki no Netsujō: Osananajimi wa Shōbōshi | Ryō Fujihashi | | |
| 2020 | Interspecies Reviewers | Tiaplate | | |
| 2020 | Super HxEros | Moena Wakakusa | | |
| 2021 | Redo of Healer | Eve | | |
| 2021–22 | World's End Harem | Chifuyu Rehn Kuroda | | |
| 2022 | Princess Connect! Re:Dive Season 2 | Kaori | | |
| 2022 | Delicious Party Pretty Cure | Kome-Kome II, Kome-Kome I | | |
| 2023 | Junji Ito Maniac: Japanese Tales of the Macabre | Kuriko | | |
| 2023 | The Gene of AI | Kaoru | | |
| 2023 | Classroom for Heroes | Deux | | |
| 2023 | Stardust Telepath | Emihara | | |
| 2025–26 | You and Idol Pretty Cure | Kokoro Shigure/Cure Kyun-Kyun | | |
| 2025 | Summer Pockets | Ao Sorakado | | |

=== Film ===
List of voice performances in film
| Year | Title | Role | Notes | Source |
|---|---|---|---|---|
| 2012 | Strike Witches: The Movie | Nikka Edvardine Katajainen | | |
| 2014 | Bodacious Space Pirates: Abyss of Hyperspace | Sasha Staple | | |
| 2014 | Pretty Rhythm All-Star Selection: Prism Show☆Best Ten | Reina Miyama | | |
| 2015 | Chieri and Cherry ちえりとチェリー | Chieri | | |
| 2015 | Love Live! The School Idol Movie | Akiba reporter | | |
| 2015 | Girls und Panzer der Film | Rosehip | | |
| 2016 | Orange: Future | Azusa Murasaka | | |
| 2017–23 | Girls und Panzer das Finale | Rum, Rosehip | | |
| 2019 | Cencoroll Connect | Kaname | | |
| 2020 | High School Fleet: The Movie | Maron Yanagiwara | | |
| 2021 | The Quintessential Quintuplets Movie | Raiha Uesugi | | |

=== Video games ===
List of voice performances in video games
| Year | Title | Role | Notes | Source |
|---|---|---|---|---|
| 2010 | Cross Days | Hanon Nijou | PC Adult; As "Toa Yukimura" | |
| 2010 | White Album | Nobuko | PS3 | |
| 2012 | The Idolmaster Cinderella Girls | Miku Maekawa | | |
| 2012 | Maji de Watashi ni Koishinasai!! S | Otomo Homura | PC Adult; As Haruka Omori | |
| 2012 | Gaku Ou: The Royal Seven Stars | Akari Konoe | PC Adult; As Yuka Kotori, also Meteor in 2013 | |
| 2012 | Shiny Days | Hanon Nijou | PC Adult; As "Toa Yukimura" | |
| 2012 | Tantei Opera Milky Holmes 2 | Ellery Himeyuri | PSP | |
| 2012–13 | Tsujidou-san no Jun'ai Road ja:辻堂さんの純愛ロード | Azusa Inui | PC Adult; As Yuka Kotori | |
| 2013 | The Pet Girl of Sakurasou | Misaki Kamiigusa | PSP, others | |
| 2013 | Muv-Luv Alternative Total Eclipse | Phoebe Theodorakis | PS3, Xbox 360 | |
| 2014 | Rozen Maiden: Wechseln Sie Welt Ab | Ms. Saito 斉藤さん | PS3, other | |
| 2014 | Of the Red, the Light, and the Ayakashi | Kamon 祁門 | PSP | |
| 2014 | Eiyu Senki Gold ja:英雄＊戦姫GOLD | Date Masamune | PC Adult; As Yuka Kotori | |
| 2014 | Granblue Fantasy | Aliza | Browser, Android, iOS | |
| 2014 | AstralAir no Shiroki Towa ja:アストラエアの白き永遠 | Ochiba Tachibana | PC Adult; As Yuka Kotori | |
| 2014 | Fatal Frame: Maiden of Black Water | Shiragiku, Tsumugi Katashina | Nintendo Wii U | |
| 2014 | Majikoi A-4 | Otomo Homura | PC Adult; As Haruka Omori | |
| 2015 | Princess Connect! ja:プリンセスコネクト！ | Kaori / Kaori Kyan | Other | |
| 2015 | Miagete Goran, Yozora no Hoshi o ja:見上げてごらん、夜空の星を | Kurona Kusakabe | PC Adult; As Yuka Kotori | |
| 2016 | Aokana: Four Rhythm Across the Blue | Saki Inui | Other | |
| 2016 | Senren Banka | Hitachi Mako | Other | |
| 2016 | Ys VIII: Lacrimosa of Dana | Laxia ラクシャ | Other | |
| 2016 | Genkai Tokki: Seven Pirates | Mimii | Other | |
| 2017 | Azur Lane | KMS Z1, IJN Yūdachi | Android, IOS | |
| 2017 | Xenoblade Chronicles 2 | Crossette | Nintendo Switch | |
| 2017 | Moe Moe 2 war battle (short) 3 ja:萌え萌え2次大戦(略) 3 | Bendetta / Lavaux ベンデッタ／ラヴォー | Other | |
| 2018 | Princess Connect! Re:Dive | Kaori / Kaori Kyan | Android, iOS, Windows | |
| 2018 | Summer Pockets | Sorakado Ao 空門蒼 | PC, Nintendo Switch | |
| 2018 | Sword Art Online: Fatal Bullet | ArFA-Sys | PC, PS4, Xbox One | |
| 2019 | Aonatsu Line | Miki Kousaka | PC Adult; As Yuka Kotori | |
| 2019 | Arknights | Гум (Gummy, 古米), Mousse | | |
| 2020 | Moe! Ninja Girls RPG | Yamabuki Suou | iOS, Android | |
| 2020 | Summer Pockets Reflection Blue | Sorakado Ao 空門蒼 | PC | |
| 2021 | Guardian Tales | The Guardian Knight (Female. Japanese, Chinese and Nintendo Switch servers only), Future Knight (All servers), Impostor Knight (Female. All servers) | iOS, Android, Nintendo Switch | |
| 2022 | MapleStory | Sugar | PC | |
| 2022 | Live A Live HD-2D Remake | Bel | Nintendo Switch | |
| 2022 | Witch on the Holy Night | May Riddell Archelot | | |
| 2023 | Reverse: 1999 | Vertin | | |
| 2024 | Honkai Impact 3rd | Songque | PC, MacOS, iOS, Android | |
| 2025 | 100% Orange Juice | Kanata | PC | |
| 2025 | Magical Girl Witch Trials | Saeki Miria | PC | |
| 2025 | Genshin impact | Aino | PC, iOS, Android, PS4/5, Xbox Series X/S | |
| 2026 | Blue Archive | Niki Anna | PC, iOS, Android | |
| 2026 | Wuthering Waves | Lily | PC, iOS, Android, PS5, Xbox Series X/S | |

=== Drama CD ===
List of voice performances in drama CD
| Year | Title | Role | Notes | Source |
|---|---|---|---|---|
| 2011 | Oreshura | Akano 赤野さん | | |
