= Yumiko Hosono =

Japanese actress, voice actress, and singer (born 1981)

- Born: June 3, 1981 (age 45); Saitama, Japan
- Occupation: singer

Yumiko Hosono (細野佑美子, Hosono Yumiko; born June 3, 1981) is a Japanese actress, voice actress, and singer from Saitama, Japan. She is also a member of the singing group COACH☆.

== Filmography ==
=== Anime ===
- Suzuka (Voice of Honoka Sakurai)
- Saint October (Voice of Artista)
- Hoshizora Kiseki (Voice of Kozue)
