= Champion Red =

Japanese manga magazine

- Categories: Seinen manga (2004–present); Shōnen manga (2002–2003)
- Frequency: Monthly
- First issue: August 19, 2002
- Company: Akita Shoten
- Country: Japan
- Based in: Tokyo
- Language: Japanese
- Website: http://www.akitashoten.co.jp/red

Champion Red Ichigo
- Categories: Seinen manga
- Frequency: Bimonthly
- First issue: December 2006
- Final issue: August 2014
- Company: Akita Shoten
- Country: Japan
- Based in: Tokyo
- Language: Japanese

Champion Red (チャンピオンRED(レッド), Chanpion Reddo) is a monthly Japanese seinen manga magazine published on the 19th of each month by Akita Shoten since August 19, 2002 (cover date October 2002), initially published as a shōnen magazine. Since 2015, the magazine slogan is "High Quality & High End Seinen Comic Magazine!" (ハイクオリティ&ハイエンド青年コミック誌！, Hai kuoriti to hai endo seinen comikku-shi!).

Champion Red Ichigo (チャンピオンRED(レッド)いちご, Chanpion Reddo Ichigo; lit. 'Champion Red Strawberry') was a special manga edition of Champion Red that ceased publication in 2014.

== Current serializations ==
There are currently 17 manga titles being serialized in Champion Red. Out of them Jinrouki Winvurga is on indefinite hiatus.

| Series Title | Author(s) | Premiered |
|---|---|---|
| Baki Gaiden Doppo - Hitori Nomi Kui Aruki (バキ外伝 神歩〜独り飲み喰い歩き〜) | Keisuke Itagaki, Kenji Hamaoka, Taakaki Hayashi | May 19, 2026 |
| Baki Gaiden: Shin Chiharu (バキ外伝 真・チハル) | Keisuke Itagaki, Tomokazu Omatsu | June 19, 2026 |
| Dead Tube (デッドチューブ, Deddo Chūbu) | Mikoto Yamaguchi, Touta Kitakawa | May 19, 2014 |
| Death Machine in Fairyland (おとぎの国のデスマシーン, Otogi no Kuni no Death Machine) | Chisato Hazama | November 19, 2025 |
| Five years after the dungeon appeared, I dare to challenge at the age of 15. (ダンジョンが現れて5年、15歳でダンジョンに挑むことにした。, Dungeon ga Arawarete Gonen, Juugosai de Dungeon ni Idomu Koto ni Shita.) | Ta-chan, Keita Kano | February 19, 2024 |
| Franken Fran Frantic (フランケン・ふらん Frantic) | Katsuhisa Kigitsu | February 19, 2019 |
| Fuan no Tane* (不安の種＊ アスタリスク) | Masaaki Nakoyama | February 19, 2019 |
| Jinrouki Winvurga (人狼機ウィンヴルガ) | Shirō Tsunashima | August 19, 2016 |
| Kougakureki Nanmin (高学歴難民) | Kyouko Abe, Bull | June 19, 2025 |
| La Magnifique Grande Scène (絢爛たるグランドセーヌ, Kenrantaru Grande Seene) | Cuvie | July 19, 2013 |
| Marry or Die: Women of Defeated Countries (妻か死か～敗戦国の女たち～, Tsuma ka Shi ka ~Haisen Koku no Onnatachi~) | Kiraku Kishima, Tohokô, XPierrot | April 19, 2024 |
| Ninja Slayer - Kyoto Heru on Asu (ニンジャスレイヤー キョート・ヘル・オン・アース) | Yuki Yogo | April 19, 2018 |
| Shinju no Nectar (神呪のネクタール) | Hiroyuki Yoshino, Kenetsu Satô | July 19, 2016 |
| Shiranai Sekai de Rippa na Mesu Doragon to shite Ikimasu! (しらない世界でりっぱな♀ドラゴンとして生きます！) | Kintaro Miyano | July 21, 2026 |
| Succubus & Hitman (サキュバス&ヒットマン) | Makoto Fugami, Seigo Takiya | February 19, 2020 |
| Todoroki Daimaru no Kikai Taikendan (轟大丸の奇怪体験談) | Kakuya Inayama | February 19, 2025 |
| Tōranki Fukushima Katsuchiyo Ichidaiki (冬嵐記 福島勝千代一代記) | Enju, Ibuki Kosaka, Roro Kamijō | September 19, 2025 |

== Past serializations ==
=== Champion Red ===
- Alien Nine Emulators by Hitoshi Tomizawa (2002)
- Batman & the Justice League (June 19, 2017 - May 17, 2019)
- Blassreiter: Genetic (November 2007 - April 2009)
- Breakfast at the Vivarium (April 2021 - November 2025)
- Captain Harlock: Dimensional Voyage (August 2014 - January 2019)
- Casshern R (September 2023 - November 2023)
- Cat Paradise (June 2006 - December 2008)
- Change 123 (June 2005 - April 2010)
- Devilman Grimoire (May 2012 - February 2014)
- Efu no Shichinin (May 2015- January 2021)
- Densha Otoko: The Story of a Train Man Who Fell in Love With A Girl (March 2005 - February 2006)
- Fuan no Tane (2004 - 2005)
- Franken Fran (September 2006 - February 2012)
- Galaxy Express 999 Another Story: Ultimate Journey (March 2018 - February 2025)
- Gomaden Shutendoji (October 2002 - December 2005)
- Linebarrels of Iron (December 2004 - April 2015)
- Princess Tutu (October 2002 - July 2003)
- Saint Seiya Episode.G (December 2002 - June 2013)
- Saint Seiya: Saintia Shō (September 2013 - July 2021)
- The Qwaser of Stigmata (September 2006 - July 2016)
- Ray (2004 - 2006)
- Shounen Princess: Putri Harimau Naoko (January 19, 2014 – May 19, 2014)
- Shin Mazinger Zero (June 2009 - December 2012)
- Witchblade Takeru (March 2006 - March 2007)
- Yakuza Girl (February 2008 - February 2009)
- Yomeiro Choice (October 2007 - August 2011, pulled from Champion Red Ichigo)

=== Champion Red Ichigo ===
- Aki Sora (September 2008 - April 2011)
- The Everyday Tales of a Cat God (July 2007 - October 2012)
- The Fruit of Grisaia: Sanctuary Fellows (February 2013, moved to Champion Cross)
- Junk: Record of the Last Hero (2004 - 2007, pulled from Champion Red)
- Kagaku Na Yatsura (2010–2013)
- Koi Koi Seven (October 2002 - March 2007, pulled from Champion Red)
- Rescue Me! (August 2008 - August 2014)
- Saint Seiya Episode.G: Assassin (April 2014, moved to Champion Cross)
- Shigurui (August 2003 - July 2010, pulled from Champion Red)
