= Gokujyo =

Japanese manga series

- Gokujyo: Gokurakuin Joshikōryō Monogatari

ゴクジョッ。〜極楽院女子校寮物語〜 (Gokujo ~Gokurakuin Joshikōryō Monogatari~)
- Genre: Comedy
- Manga
- Written by: Maya Miyazaki
- Published by: Shueisha
- Magazine: Super Jump (2009–2011); Grand Jump (2011–2013); Grand Jump website (2013–2015)
- Original run: 2009 – 2015
- Volumes: 10
- Anime television series
- Directed by: Futoshi Higashide
- Written by: Yuuji Hosono
- Studio: LMD
- Original network: Chukyo TV; DMM (streaming)
- Original run: January 23, 2012 – March 28, 2012
- Episodes: 12

Gokujyo: Gokurakuin Joshikōryō Monogatari (ゴクジョッ。〜極楽院女子校寮物語〜; lit. "Extreme Woman. The Tales of Gokurakuin Girls School Dorm") is a Japanese manga series by Maya Miyazaki. An anime television series by LMD aired in Japan between January and March, 2012.

== Plot ==
The series follows the exploits of Aya Akabane, a busty and arrogant high school girl who is constantly trying to outdo her classmates in everything (especially anything topic related to sex), only to make a fool of herself in the process. The show is set at Gokuraku High School, an all-girls boarding school.

== Characters ==
Aya Akabane (赤羽 亜矢, Akabane Aya)
Voiced by: Yōko Hikasa
The main protagonist, a loud mouthed girl with an eye for looking sexy and a short fuse.
Konatsu Toro (土呂 小夏, Toro Konatsu)
Voiced by: Natsumi Takamori
Aya's friend, who is often used as an outlet for Aya's rage, most often being grabbed by her ponytail.
Ai Nanasato (七里 愛, Nanasato Ai)
Voiced by: Maaya Uchida
Konatsu's best friend who is pretty normal compared to everyone else.
Asuka Utsunomiya (宇都宮 飛鳥, Utsunomiya Asuka)
Voiced by: Nozomi Sasaki
A mysterious girl who often talks about spiritual phenomenon. She appears to be romantically interested in Aya.
Madoka Oowada (大和田 円, Oowada Madoka)
Voiced by: Satomi Akesaka
A wildly perverted girl who has various fantasies and constant nosebleeds.
Kaname Oku (尾久 要, Oku Kaname)
Voiced by: Yukari Kokubun
A teacher at Aya's school and the head of a bosozuko biker gang.
Saya Akabane (赤羽 沙矢, Akabane Saya)
Voiced by: Mamiko Noto
Aya's older sister who is a gang member alongside Kaname and is greatly feared by Aya, despite her sweet and gentle personality and always having a smile on her face.
Minami Kurihashi (栗橋 南, Kurihashi Minami)
Voiced by: Ayana Taketatsu
A wealthy transfer student who looks down on others, often calling them 'potato girls'; she prefers being called by her nickname "Minamin". She used to live in France and later Los Angeles until her father got a job transfer back in Japan. Upon her recent transfer, she's been assigned as the school's health officer and refers to Aya as "Aya-cchi"-(much to the latter dismay). She has an electric toothbrush that she calls "Francois".

== Media ==
=== Manga ===
Gokujyo is written and illustrated by Maya Miyazaki. It started in Shueisha's Super Jump in 2009. After Super Jump ceased its publication in 2011, the manga was transferred to Grand Jump. It was also published in Grand Jump website, where its most recent chapter was published in November 2015.

=== Anime ===
The manga has been adapted into an anime series by LMD. The series began airing on Chukyo TV from January 23, 2012. Certain episodes containing explicit content were not broadcast and were instead streamed on DMM's website from January 30, 2012. An additional original video animation episode was released on BD/DVD on June 26, 2013. The opening theme is "Gokujyo. no Jōken?" (ゴクジョッ。のジョーケン?; "Requirements for Being an Extreme Woman?") by Yōko Hikasa, Maaya Uchida, Ayana Taketatsu and Satomi Akesaka, whilst the ending theme is "Goku Jyo Overdrive" (極・女おー・う゛ぁーどらいぶ, Goku Jo Ōvādoraibu; "Extreme Woman Overdrive") by Hikasa, Uchida, Taketatsu and Akesaka.

==== Episode list ====
No.	Title	Original release date
1	"Who's Got No Panties!?"; Transliteration: "Nōpan wa Dare da!?" (Japanese: ノーパンは誰だ!?)	January 30, 2012 (stream)
A show off girl named Aya ends up losing her panties somewhere and tries to steal panties from her classmate Konatsu before she's discovered.
2	"The Hiccups Won't Stop"; Transliteration: "Shakkuri Toman ne." (Japanese: しゃっくり止まんねぇ。)	January 23, 2012
Aya develops hiccups, so the others try to help cure them.
3	"Executioner Girl & Demon King's Advent"; Transliteration: "Shokei Musume & Maō Kōrin" (Japanese: 処刑娘&魔王降臨)	February 6, 2012 (stream)
Aya is fearful of her older sister, Saya, and her gang leader boss, Kaname Oku.
4	"First ** at the Pool!?"; Transliteration: "Pūru de Hatsu ○○!?" (Japanese: プールで初○○!?)	February 13, 2012
As Aya's secret underwater plans are thwarted by Asuka Utsunomiya, she almost drowns and ends up having her first kiss taken by Kaname via CPR.
5	"Utsonomiya's Cold Treatment"; Transliteration: "Utsunomiya Shiki Reikan Kaze Chiryō" (Japanese: 宇都宮式 霊感カゼ治療)	February 27, 2012 (stream)
When Aya gets sick with a cold, Asuka comes over to nurse her back to health in her own unique way.
6	"Utsunomiya is Mysterious!!"; Transliteration: "Utsunomiya o Odorokasō!!" (Japanese: 宇都宮を驚かそう!!)	February 20, 2012
Aya comes up with a crazy scheme to try to get Asuka to smile.
7	"Gokurakuin Girls' School Carnival"; Transliteration: "Gokurakuin Joshigakuin Shanikusai" (Japanese: 極楽院女子学院謝肉祭)	February 27, 2012
Konatsu gets a lot of Matsuzaka beef, prompting Aya to have a yakiniku party which gets a few uninvited guests.
8	"The Princess Descends!!"; Transliteration: "Hime Kōrin!!" (Japanese: 姫降臨!!)	March 5, 2012
A rich brat named Minami Kurihashi enrols into the high school, inadvertently picking a fight with Aya after cleaning up her hang out spot.
9	"Forgetful Aya-chan"; Transliteration: "Do Wasure Aya-chan" (Japanese: ド忘れ亜矢ちゃん)	March 12, 2012
Aya contracts amnesia after slipping on a banana skin, so the gang works together to try to bring back her memories.
10	"Wet Bitch Showdown!!"; Transliteration: "Nure Bicchi Ketteisen!!" (Japanese: 濡れビッチ決定戦!!)	April 2, 2012 (stream)
Aya misunderstands a conversation between Konatsu and Ai and gets into a heated debate with Minami about who's more 'appealing'.
11	"Crazy Masquerade?"; Transliteration: "Masukarēdo de Zukyūn?" (Japanese: マスカレードでズキュゥーン？)	March 19, 2012
The girls attend a masquerade ball where everyone besides Ai ends up under the influence of the 'juice' being served.
12	"Farewell, Kurihashi!!"; Transliteration: "Saraba Kurihashi!!" (Japanese: さらば栗橋!!)	March 28, 2012
Minami is due to return to LA, so the girls set off some fireworks to see her off.
OVA	"Yeah, Let's Go to the Hot Springs!!"; Transliteration: "Sō da Onsen ni Ikō!!" (Japanese: そうだ温泉にいこう!!)	June 26, 2013
A school trip to a hot spring inn proves unnerving for Aya after she hears a scary story. Later that night, Asuka makes some moves on Ai whilst the others sleep.
