= Kumi Sakuma =

Japanese voice actress (born 1976)

Kumi Sakuma (佐久間 紅美, Sakuma Kumi; born November 2, 1976 in Chiba Prefecture) is a Japanese voice actress who formerly affiliated with Arts Vision and is now affiliated with Amuleto. She is best known for voicing Momo Hinamori in the anime, Bleach.

== Filmography ==
=== Television animation ===
1998

- Legend of the Mystical Ninja (Nyanko)
- Nessa no Haou Gandalla (Nurse)

2000

- Ceres, Celestial Legend (Celestial Maiden)
- Strange Dawn (Reika)
- Descendants of Darkness (Eileen)
- Sci-Fi Harry (Female Student B (eps 1, 3))
- Ghost Stories (Momoko Koigakubo)

2001

- Comic Party (Child (ep 12), Clerk at Marvel Cafe, Customer (eps 3, 7, 9), Female Student (eps 2, 10), Kazuki's mother, Staff (ep 5))
- You're Under Arrest Second Season (Primary School Children)
- Offside (Nagisa's Mother)
- Fruits Basket (Girl (ep 2))
- X (Yuzuriha Nekoi)

2002

- Seven of Seven (Akane Sugiyama)
- Happy Lesson (Librarians)
- Tenchi Muyo! GXP (Kiriko Masaki)
- Tokyo Mew Mew (Retasu Midorikawa/Mew Lettuce)

2003

- Origami Warriors (Goku Hitsugaya, Nemu Ashikawa, Tomomi Hitsugaya)
- Scrapped Princess (Gloria)
- Kino's Journey (Mother (ep 4))
- Tantei Gakuen Q (Mio Kazama)
- Please Twins! (Futaba Mashita)
- Gungrave (Mika Asagi)
- Peacemaker Kurogane (Yuugao)
- Someday's Dreamers (Aya Kikuchi)
- Texhnolyze (Michiko Kouda)

2004

- Diamond Daydreams (Taiko)
- Sgt. Frog
- Midori Days (Yuka)
- Monster (Edda)
- Pugyuru (Mizore)
- Otogi Zoshi (Urabe no Suetake)
- Desert Punk (Dog Woman)
- Black Jack 21 (Princess)
- Grenadier (Kasumi)

2005

- Bleach (Momo Hinamori)
- Peach Girl (Female Student (eps 1–4), Kako (18 episodes))
- Koi Koi Seven (Yaki)
- Comic Party: Revolution (Yuka Tsukishiro, Miho Hoshino, Yu's Mother, Kuro Mizuki)
- Best Student Council (Seina Katsura)
- Honey and Clover (Yukie Ishida)
- Happy Seven (Tomoya Kuki)
- Magical Girl Lyrical Nanoha A's (Sachie Ishida)

2006

- Soul Link (Nao Morisaki)
- Honey and Clover II (Satsuki-sensei (ep 9))
- Tsuyokiss - Cool×Sweet (Inori Ooeyama)
- Black Blood Brothers (Sayuka Shirane)
- Super Robot Wars OG: Divine Wars (Garnet Sunday)

2007

- Shining Tears X Wind (Reia Hiruda)
- Kimikiss pure rouge (Koichi's mother)

2008

- Bleach (Emilou Apacci)
- XxxHOLiC: Kei (Female (ep 10))
- Blassreiter (Jil Hoffmann)
- Nabari no Ou (Nurse (ep 18))
- Slayers Revolution (Maid (ep 10))
- Clannad After Story (Talent (ep 11))
- Nodame Cantabile: Paris (Elise)

2009

- Maria Holic (Tonomura)
- Slayers Evolution-R (Chibi Dragon)
- Polyphonica Crimson S (Leica)

2010

- Ladies versus Butlers! (Mikan)
- Uragiri wa Boku no Namae o Shitteiru (Yomi)

2011

- Maria Holic Alive (Tonomura)

2012

- High School DxD (Karawana)
- Senki Zesshō Symphogear (Mother, Woman Girl)

2014

- Recently, My Sister Is Unusual (Nanami Akazaka)

2022

- Bleach: Thousand-Year Blood War (Momo Hinamori, Emilou Apacci)

=== OVA ===
- Carnival Phantasm (Ciel, Neco-Arc Bubbles)
- From I"s (Iori Yoshizuki)
- Kagaku Na Yatsura (Touko Hizuki)
- Mizuiro (Asami Kōzu)

=== Video games ===
- Record of Agarest War Zero (Sayane)
- Gokujou Seitokai (Seina Katsura)
- Lucky Star (Fuyuki Amahara)
- Melty Blood (Ciel and Powerd Ciel)
- Mizuiro (Asami Kōzu)
- Super Robot Wars series (Garnet Sandi, Mimsy Laaz)
- The Super Dimension Fortress Macross (PS2 version) (Vanessa Laird)
- Tokyo Mew Mew (Retasu Midorikawa)
- Fire Emblem: Akatsuki no megami (Goddess of Dawn)
- X: Unmei no Sentaku (Yuzuriha Nekoi)
- Hyperdevotion Noire: Goddess Black Heart (Lady Wac)

=== Radio drama ===
- Final Fantasy Tactics Advance (Babus Swain)
