= Meshimase Rōdosu Senki: Sorette Oishii no? =

Japanese anime television series

- Meshimase Lodoss-tō Senki: Sorette Oishii no?
- Promotional poster of the series.

召しませロードス島戦記 〜それっておいしいの?〜 (Meshimase Rōdosu Senki: Sorette Oishii no?)
- Genre: Comedy
- Anime television series
- Directed by: Iku Suzuki
- Written by: Deko Akao; Natsuko Takahashi
- Studio: Studio Deen, Studio Hibari
- Original network: Tokyo MX, Sun TV, AT-X, Niconico
- Original run: April 6, 2014 – June 29, 2014
- Episodes: 13

Meshimase Lodoss-tō Senki: Sorette Oishii no? (召しませロードス島戦記 〜それっておいしいの?〜, Meshimase Rōdosu Senki: Sorette Oishii no?; lit. Have Some, Record of Lodoss War: Is That Delicious?) is a Japanese anime television series produced by Kadokawa Shoten. Thirteen episodes aired between April 6 and June 29, 2014. The series is a parody of the Record of Lodoss War media franchise.

== Plot ==
Meshimase Rōdosu Senki: Sorette Oishii no? is inspired by the fantasy franchise "Record of Lodoss War" by Ryo Mizuno. The show follows school-age kids working on a theatrical play based on the franchise. Their inexperience and lack of a budget has comical results.

== Characters ==
Ban (バン)
Voiced by: Shuta Morishima
Dori (ドリ)
Voiced by: Ibuki Kido
Eto (エト)
Voiced by: Erii Yamazaki
