= Hisako Tōjō =

Japanese voice actress

- 東城 日沙子
- Born: August 21, 1990 (age 36); Saitama Prefecture, Japan
- Other names: Hicha (ひちゃ); Tojo-san (とじょさん); Jō (じょー)
- Occupation: Voice actress
- Years active: 2012–present
- Agent: Early Wing
- Height: 156 cm (5 ft 1 in)

Hisako Tōjō (東城 日沙子, Tōjō Hisako; born August 21, 1990) is a female Japanese voice actress from Saitama Prefecture. She is represented with Early Wing.

== Biography ==
Under the influence of an older sister who loved anime and manga and was aiming to become a voice actor, she came to want to become a voice actress. Tojo joined when she was in fifth grade because her friend was in a children's theater company. There was also a troupe member who appeared in the work as a voice actor and expected that "there may be a voice actor job", but only had the opportunity to perform an extra. On the other hand, she said that she was not conscious of aiming for a voice actor at this time.

When she was a junior high school student, she played a famous role in a cultural festival drama for three years, which increased her interest in the play. At first, she longed for actresses and stage actors, but aspired to be a voice actor as she can play her favorite world. she entered a training school or vocational school where she can enter from 15 years old, but she thought that might find something wanted to do other than a voice actor, she entered high school. However, the desire to become a voice actor remained the same, and entered high school after graduating from high school. At the vocational school audition, the voice actor and narrator training studio (SNT) staff of the Early Wing training school looked only at Tojo and entered.

== Filmography ==
Bold denotes her main characters.

=== TV anime ===
2012

- Place to Place - Neko Nora
- Love, Election and Chocolate - Female student B
- Haitai Nanafa - Kahna

2013

- Day Break Illusion - Elementary school girl, girl B
- Freezing - Julia = Mumberg

2014

- Monster Retsuden Oreca Battle - Child
- 'Samurai Flamenco - Passerby
- Noragami - Maiden B
- Himegoto - Albertina II
- Black Bullet - Maria

2015

- Urawa no Usagi-chan - Midori Sayado
- Dance with Devils - Slave
- Durarara!! - Azusa Tsutsugawa, shrine maiden (Note: The role of "shrine maiden" is released to theatres (13.5 talks in love shame))
- Noragami: Aragoto - Tomomi Ai
- YuruYuri - Female Student B -

2016

- Scorching Ping Pong Girls - Kiruka Gote
- Divine Gate - Samidare
- 91 Days - Cortero (young), Phio, child, female customer
- Natsume Yūjin-chō Go - Otaka Youkai face thief
- B-Project: Kodō*Ambiguous - Utahime lunch B, boy, female A, makeup B

2017

- Hinako Note - Chiaki Hagino
- Anonymous Noise - Female student 2, female MC
- Rage of Bahamut - Clerk
- Natsume Yūjin-chō Roku - Rabbit face yokai
- Love Tyrant - Shop clerk
- Anime Gatari - Yoshiko Koenji

2018

- Lord of Vermilion: The Crimson King - Tachikaze Tsubasa
- Ulysses: Jeanne d'Arc and the Alchemist Knight - Astaroth
- Xuan Yuan Sword Luminary - Li Xiang

2019

- My Roommate is a Cat - Nagisa Yasaka
- Yatogame-chan Kansatsu Nikki - Hanka Jin
- After School Dice Club - Hana Takayashiki
- Didn't I Say to Make My Abilities Average in the Next Life?! - Aureana
- Outburst Dreamer Boys - Hanaka Tsukumo
- Demon Slayer: Kimetsu no Yaiba - Ozaki

2020

- Yatogame-chan Kansatsu Nikki 2 Satsume - Hanka Jin

2021

- Dragon Goes House-Hunting - Harpy B
- PuraOre! Pride of Orange - China Yoneyama

2022

- Healer Girl - Shoko Nagisa
- Musashino! - Midori Saido

2023

- Berserk of Gluttony - Roxy

2024

- Re:Monster - The Alchemist

2025

- Your Forma - Raissa Germaine Robin
- Gachiakuta - Tomme
- A Wild Last Boss Appeared! - Libra

2027

- Booty Royale: Never Go Down Without a Fight! - Misora Haebaru

=== Anime films ===
2015

Title
Love Live! The School Idol Movie

2016

Title	Ref.
Digimon Adventure tri.: Determination	
Digimon Adventure tri.: Confession	
Pop in Q	

=== Video games ===
2012

Title	Role
Ciel Nosurge	Nero

2013

Title	Role	Ref.
Ilog	Alice Iino	
La storia della Arcana Famiglia	Iori	
Girl Friend Beta	**Kumiko Nanjo**	
Senran Kagura Shinovi Versus		
Soul Master	Lulua	
Disgaea D2: A Brighter Darkness		
Hissatsu Shigoto Hito: Oshioki Collection–	Suzune Tachibana	
Meikyū-tō-ji Roegasysta	Moyapī	

2014

Title	Role	Ref.
Ar Nosurge	Nero	
Heroes Placement	Ko Toi	
Break Suzume Burst	**Kai**	

2015

Title	Role	Ref.
AiPara! Idol Paradise	Maia Lucifer	
Shironeko Project	Floria Lekranse	
Root Rexx	Ami Kuzuha	
Monster Musume	Hydra Mirage Rosti	

2016

Title	Role	Ref.
Ichi Chi Manji Suguru -Online-	**Amaterasu**	
Quiz RPG: Mahōtsukai to Kuro Neko no Wiz	Mary Mituboshi, Gwyn Nervia, Trandea	
Cross World	**Tolphin**	
Genkai Tokki: Seven Pirates	Garnet	
Summon Night 6	Fair	
Shironeko Tennis	**Islay**	
Trickster –Shōkansamurai ni naritai–	**Ceria**	

2018

Title	Role	Ref.
Death end re;Quest	**Shina Ninomiya**	
Dragon Star Varnir	**Laponette**	

2019

Title	Role	Ref.
13 Sentinels: Aegis Rim	**Erika Aiba**	

2020

Title	Role	Ref.
Death end re;Quest 2	**Shina Ninomiya**	

2023

Title	Role	Ref.
Takt Op. Symphony	Erlkönig	

=== Digital comics ===
2014

Title	Role	Ref.
Kurosagi	**Tsurara Yoshikawa**	
Deltora Quest	Shan	

=== Radio ===
Bold denotes that it is currently broadcast. ※internet distributed.

Year	Title	Website	Ref.
2013	Aidoru-chō Radio-kyoku	2.5-dimensional farewell official website	
2014	Shimo-ka Seito-kai no Himegoto Radio	Onsen	
2014	**Twinkle Girls: Suiyōbi wa koko de**	Niconico Live Broadcast	
2015	Amazing Soul Labo Radio	HiBiKi Radio Station	
2016	Trickster Radio!!	Onsen	

=== Radio dramas ===
Title	Role
Locador Promotion	Nana Mizushima

=== Dubbing ===
==== Live-action ====
- Host, Caroline (Caroline Ward)
- Wire Room, Nour Holborow (Shelby Cobb)

==== Animation ====
- Shinbi's House (Tooniverse) – Gaeun Lee/Lee Gaeun (Yeo Min-jeong)

== Participation units ==
- AGC38 – Two-dimensional Virtual Idol Unit by Asahi Production's Producer. As No. 18 Aoi Sakurakouji.
- Twinkle Girls Ailes – Voice acting unit by Early Wing members. On 17 May 2015, she graduated from Twinkle Girls 5th Live Nichiyōbi wa koko kara –Start Line–.
- I My Me Mine – Voice acting unit produced by Asahi Production.

== Discography ==
=== Character songs ===
Date	Product	Singers	Song	Notes
2014
Dec	– (Note: CD not recorded.)	Maia Lucifer (Hisako Tōjō), Nina Kuchi (Hikaru Ueda), Marin Raines (Yurina Furukawa)	"The Shining Shooting Star"	Game AiPara! Idol Paradise related song
2016
25 Nov	Shakunetsu Switch	Sparrow is Hara Elementary School Table Tennis Department (Note: Yumiri Hanamori, Minami Tanaka, Ayaka Imamura, Hisako Tōjō, Marika Kōno, Yūki Kuwahara)	"Shakunetsu Switch"	TV anime Scorching Ping Pong Girls opening theme
25 Nov	Shakunetsu Switch	Sparrow is Hara Elementary School Table Tennis Department	"V Ji Jōshō Victory"	TV anime Scorching Ping Pong Girls related song
2017
25 Jan	Scorching Ping Pong Girls Double Song Series 3 Munemune & Kiruka	Munemune (Ayaka Imamura), Kiruka Gote (Hisako Tōjō)	"Bukatsu Deluxe"; "Suzume ga Gen Chūgakkō Kōka Munemune & Kiruka ver."	TV anime Scorching Ping Pong Girls related songs
22 Feb	Scorching Ping Pong Girls Unit Song Series 2	Hanabi Tenka (Marika Kōno), Munemune (Ayaka Inamura), Kiruka Gote (Hisako Tōjō)	"Magau koto naki Chōsen-sha"; "Seichō-ki Stars Hanabi & Munemune & Kiruka ver."	TV anime Scorching Ping Pong Girls related songs
10 May	A-E-I-U-E-O Ao!	Gekidan Hitose (Note: Hinako Sakuragi (M.A.O), Kuina Natsukawa (Miyu Tomita), Mayuki Hiiragi (Yui Ogura), Chiaki Ogino (Hisako Tōjō), Yua Nakajima (Marika Kōno))	"A-E-I-U-E-O Ao!"	TV anime Hinako Note opening theme
10 May	"Curtain Call!!!!!"	Gekidan Hitose	""Curtain Call!!!!!"	TV anime Hinako Note ending theme
10 May	"Curtain Call!!!!!"	Mayuki Hiiragi (Yui Ogura), Chiaki Ogino (Hisako Tōjō)	"Shiawase-iro"	TV anime Hinako Note related song
