= So You Weren't Into Me?! =

Japanese manga series

- First tankōbon volume cover

私のこと好きじゃなかったのかよ!? (Watashi no Koto Suki ja Nakatta no ka yo!?)
- Genre: Harem; Romantic comedy
- Manga
- Written by: Wakame Konbu
- Published by: Shueisha
- Imprint: Young Jump Comics
- Magazine: Weekly Young Jump
- Original run: February 12, 2026 – present
- Volumes: 2

So You Weren't Into Me?! (私のこと好きじゃなかったのかよ!?, Watashi no Koto Suki ja Nakatta no ka yo!?) is a Japanese manga series written and illustrated by Wakame Konbu. It began serialization in Shueisha's Weekly Young Jump magazine in February 2026, and has been compiled into two volumes as of October 2026.

== Plot ==
Kazuaki Okabe, a second-year high school student, had become jaded about love after seeing his former crush get married. Now in high school, he becomes suspicious about the girls who have taken an interest in him, misinterpreting their intentions. On the other hand, they misinterpret his own actions as him not being interested in them.

== Characters ==
Kazuaki Okabe (岡部 かずあき, Okabe Kazuaki)
Voiced by: Tomohiro Ōno (vomic)
A second-year high school student who developed a disdain for love ever since his sister's friend, his crush at the time, suddenly got married. Due to the shock, he failed the entrance exams for his first-choice school. He is childhood friends with Hina and Rui, although he does not reciprocate their feelings.
Kiara Sano (佐野 きあら, Sano Kiara)
Voiced by: Saori Hayami (vomic)
Kiara's classmate, who gains an interest in him and gives him her contact information. She has a cool and mysterious personality, not having been seen talking to others prior to her interest in Kazuaki.
Hina Nishina (仁科 ひな, Nishina Hina)
Voiced by: Naomi Ōzora (vomic)
Kazuaki's childhood friend and classmate. She has a cheerful and energetic personality, making her among the most popular girls in class.
Rui Kuon (久遠 るい, Kuon Rui)
Voiced by: Ayaka Suwa (vomic)
Kazuaki's childhood friend and a first-year student. She has a cool personality, which she developed because Kazuaki once told her he was interested in cool women. Despite having only started her high school life, she has already received love letters.
Satori Inoue (猪上 さとり, Inoue Satori)
Voiced by: Ai Kayano (vomic)
Kazuaki's cousin and a university student. She also serves as his tutor. She has had feelings for Kazuaki since they were children.

== Publication ==
Written and illustrated by Wakame Konbu, the series began serialization in Shueisha's Weekly Young Jump magazine on February 12, 2026. The first tankōbon volume was released on July 17, 2026; five voiced comic videos were posted on the official Weekly Young Jump YouTube channel to promote the volume's release. Two volumes have been released as of October 19, 2026. The series is also simultaneously released in English on Shueisha's Manga Plus app.

No.	Release date	ISBN
1	July 17, 2026	978-4-08-894274-2
2	October 19, 2026	978-4-08-894370-1

== See also ==
- Breasts Are My Favorite Things in the World!, another manga series by the same author
- The Great Jahy Will Not Be Defeated!, another manga series by the same author
- The Maid I Hired Recently Is Mysterious, another manga series by the same author
