= Comic Cune =

Japanese manga magazine

- Cover of Comic Cune featuring Ms. Vampire Who Lives in My Neighborhood
- Categories: Seinen manga
- Frequency: Monthly
- Publisher: Media Factory
- First issue: August 27, 2015
- Country: Japan
- Based in: Tokyo
- Language: Japanese
- Website: Comic Cune

Comic Cune (Japanese: コミックキューン, Hepburn: Komikku Kyūn) is a Japanese seinen manga magazine which mainly serializes 4-koma manga published by Media Factory. The magazine originally began to be published as a supplement 4-koma magazine in Comic Alive in October 2014 but in June 2015, the publisher announced that Comic Cune would be its own magazine instead of just a supplement for Comic Alive, with the magazine debuting on August 27, 2015, with the titles it had before.

== Serialized titles ==
- Alice or Alice
- Akarui Kioku Soushitsu
- Breasts Are My Favorite Things in the World!
- Cheerful Amnesia
- Elf-sensei no Toilet wa Doko desu ka?
- Gal to Otaku wa Wakariaenai
- Harukiya-san wa Ijippri
- Himegasaki Sakurako Is a Hot Mess
- Hinako Note
- I Don't Know Which Is Love
- Karin-chan wa Misetagari
- Lulumate
- Meshi Tero-kei Gradol wa Gaman Dekinai!?
- Ms. Vampire Who Lives in My Neighborhood
- My Lovey-Dovey Wife Is a Stone Cold Killer
- Neeko wa Tsurai yo
- Nyanko Days
- Nyoroko no Nama Hōsō!
- Pan de Peace!
- Popopo no Oneesan
- Sakura Maimai
- Seishun Sweet Track
- Shimeji Simulation
- Shiritsu Seijō Gakuen Kirarin Ryō
- Siscon Onee-chan to Ki ni Shinai Imouto
- Spirits & Cat Ears
- Watashi no Go-shūjin-sama wa Ningen Janai Ki ga Suru
- Yuri Life

== Anime adaptations ==
- Pan de Peace! - Spring 2016
- Nyanko Days - Winter 2017
- Hinako Note - Spring 2017
- Alice or Alice - Spring 2018
- Ms. Vampire Who Lives in My Neighborhood - Fall 2018
- Elf-sensei no Toilet wa Doko desu ka? - TBA
