= Ibuki Kido =

Japanese voice actress (born 1997)

- 木戸 衣吹
- Born: November 14, 1997 (age 28); Aomori, Aomori Prefecture, Japan
- Occupation: Voice actress
- Years active: 2012–present
- Agent: HoriPro International
- Height: 156 cm (5 ft 1 in)
- Musical career
- Genres: J-Pop; Anison
- Instrument: Vocals
- Years active: 2014–present

Ibuki Kido (木戸 衣吹, Kido Ibuki; born November 14, 1997) is a Japanese voice actress from Aomori Prefecture who is affiliated with HoriPro International. She began her career after participating in a voice acting audition held by Horipro in 2011. She played her first main role as Akiko Himenokōji in the 2012 anime series OniAi; she is also known for her roles as Natsuki Andō in Chronicles of the Going Home Club, Nanami Knight Bladefield in If Her Flag Breaks, Megumi Jinno in Eromanga Sensei, and Mio Minato in Aikatsu Friends!. she was a member of the singing duo Everying! together with Erii Yamazaki.

== Biography ==
Kido was born in Aomori Prefecture on November 14, 1997. She had wanted to pursue a career in acting since she was three years old, when she began doing "pretend plays". During her fourth year of elementary school, she developed an interest in anime after watching the television series Shugo Chara! The acting performance of Nana Mizuki, who played the role of Utau Hoshina in the series, left a major impression of her and helped influence her decision to pursue voice acting as a career. To practice her skills, she would mute the television whenever an anime series was airing, and she would voice over what was being played.

In 2011, Kido joined an audition held by the talent agency Horipro. She ended up as a finalist at the competition, which was eventually won by Azusa Tadokoro. She then became affiliated with Horipro, and the following year she played her first anime role as an executive committee member in the anime series Amagami SS+ plus. At the age of 14, she played her first main role as Akiko Himenokōji in the anime series OniAi; she and fellow cast members Minori Chihara, Asami Shimoda, and Eri Kitamura performed the song "Life-Ru is Love-Ru!!" which was used as the ending theme to the series.

In 2013, Kido played the roles of Kasumi Shinomiya in GJ Club, Ria Hagry in Oreimo, and Natsuki Ando in Chronicles of the Going Home Club. The following year, she played the roles of Rinka Urushiba in Tokyo ESP, Claire Rouge in Bladedance of Elementalers, and Nanami Knight Bladefield in If Her Flag Breaks. She also voiced Cocorobo, a robotic vacuum cleaner developed by Sharp. She then formed the singing duo Everying! together with Erii Yamazaki, a fellow Horipro artist; the name of the duo is derived from the names of its two members.

In 2015, she played the roles of Hibiki Amami in Re-Kan! and Sakuya Shimazu in Isuca. The following year, she played the roles of Chisame Nakano in Bakuon!! and Minami Tani in Pan de Peace! In 2017, she played the role of Megumi Jinno in Eromanga Sensei. That same year it was announced that Everying would go on indefinite hiatus to coincide with each member turning 20 years old. In 2018, she was cast as the character Mio Minato in the series Aikatsu Friends!

Kido announced her marriage to someone outside of the industry on her 27th Birthday.

== Filmography ==
=== Anime series ===
Year	Title	Role
2012	Aikatsu!	Asami Himuro, Kurumi Mori
2012	Nazotoki-hime wa Meitantei: Kaizoku no Takara to Komori-uta	Hinami Shiori
2012	OniAi	Akiko Himenokōji
2013	GJ Club	Kasumi Shinomiya
2013	Golden Time	Chinami Oka
2013	Chronicles of the Going Home Club	Natsuki Ando
2013	My Teen Romantic Comedy SNAFU	Yuka
2013	Oreimo	Ria Hagry
2014	Kanojo ga Flag o Oraretara	Nanami Knight Braidfield
2014	Kenzen Robo Daimidaler	Soriko Majikina
2014	Meshimase Lodoss-tō Senki: Sorette Oishii no?	Dori
2014	Nobunaga the Fool	Nell
2014	Oneechan ga Kita	Mina Fujisaki
2014	Orenchi no Furo Jijō	Kasumi
2014	Pupa	Yume Hasegawa
2014	Seirei Tsukai no Blade Dance	Claire Rouge
2014	Tokyo ESP	Rinka Urushiba
2015	Isuca	Sakuya Shimazu
2015	Re-Kan!	Hibiki Amami
2015	Sky Wizards Academy	Christina Balcuhorn
2015	Subete ga F ni Naru	Shiki Magata
2016	Bakuon!!	Chisame Nakano
2016	Ooya-san wa Shishunki!	Mayu Ueno
2016	Pan de Peace!	Minami Tani
2016	Show by Rock!!♯	Hundreko
2016	Trickster	Noro Makoto
2016	Tonkatsu DJ Agetaro	Shiori Karai
2017	Nyanko Days	Maa
2017	Battle Girl High School	Kaede Sendoin
2017	Eromanga Sensei	Megumi Jinno
2018	Aikatsu Friends!	Mio Minato
2019	Aikatsu on Parade!	Mio Minato
2021	Show by Rock!! Stars!!	Hundreko
2021	The Honor Student at Magic High School	Tōko Tsukushiin
2022	Princess Connect! Re:Dive Season 2	Tsumugi

=== Anime films ===
Year	Title	Role
2020	Happy-Go-Lucky Days	Shin-chan
2022	Idol Bu Show	Futaba Ayase

=== Video games ===
Year	Title	Role
2014	Schoolgirl Strikers	Niho Hinomiya
2014	THE iDOLM@STER: ONE FOR ALL	Kana Yabuki
2015	Battle Girl High School	Kaede Sendoin
2016	Girls' Frontline	HSM10, M82
2016	SoulWorker	Lily Bloomerchen
2017	Azur Lane	Shropshire, Leander
2017	Magia Record	Ayame Mikuri
2018	Princess Connect! Re:Dive	Tsumugi / Tsumugi Mayumiya
2021	Blue Archive	Asahina Pina
2023	Honkai Impact 3rd	Shigure Kira

=== Dubbing ===
Year	Title	Role
2021	Calamity, a Childhood of Martha Jane Cannary	Eve
