= Nyanko Days =

Japanese manga and anime series

- Cover of the first manga volume

にゃんこデイズ
- Genre: Comedy, slice of life
- Manga
- Written by: Tarabagani
- Published by: Media Factory
- Magazine: Comic Cune
- Original run: August 2014 – October 27, 2020.
- Volumes: 5
- Anime television series
- Directed by: Yoshimasa Hiraike
- Produced by: Akiko Ooyama; Hideaki Miyamoto; Tadakazu Hiraga; Yūi Sakurai
- Written by: Yoshimasa Hiraike
- Studio: EMT Squared
- Licensed by: NA: Crunchyroll
- Original network: Sun TV, Tokyo MX, AT-X
- Original run: January 8, 2017 – March 26, 2017
- Episodes: 12

Nyanko Days (にゃんこデイズ) is a Japanese four-panel manga series written and illustrated by Tarabagani. It has been serialized since August 2014 in Media Factory's Comic Cune magazine and as of September 2016, it has been collected into a single tankōbon volume. An anime television series adaptation by EMT Squared aired from January 8 to March 26, 2017.

== Characters ==
Yuko Konagai (小長井 友子, Konagai Yūko)
Voiced by: Akari Uehara
The main protagonist of the series. She is shy by nature and has 3 cats (Maa, Shii and Rou).
Maa (まー)
Voiced by: Ibuki Kido
One of Yuko's cats. She is a mischievous Munchkin who loves to explore.
Shii (しー)
Voiced by: Erii Yamazaki
One of Yuko's cats. She is a laid back Singapura cat.
Ro (ろー)
Voiced by: Mikako Komatsu
One of Yuko's cats. She is a level headed Russian Blue.
Azumi Shiratori (白鳥 あづみ, Shiratori Azumi)
Voiced by: Naomi Ōzora
Yuko's friend/classmate and a popular girl in their class. She is from a rich family and has a cat named Elza.
Arashi Iketani (池谷 嵐, Iketani Arashi)
Voiced by: Kazusa Aranami
A gyaru-ish girl and Azumi's self-proclaimed rival, who often challenges her, and has a fear of cats.
Elza (エルザ, Eruza)
Voiced by: Mayu Udono
Azumi's Turkish Angora cat.

== Media ==
=== Manga ===
Nyanko Days is a four-panel manga series by Tarabagani, a Japanese manga artist who mainly draws adult comics. It began serialization in Comic Cune's October 2014 issue released on August 27, 2014; At first, Comic Cune was a "magazine in magazine" placed in Monthly Comic Alive, later it became independent of Comic Alive and changed to a formal magazine on August 27, 2015. Nyanko Days is also available on Kadokawa Corporation's ComicWalker website. It has been collected in a single tankōbon volume.

=== Anime ===
An anime television series adaptation aired between January and March 2017. Yoshimasa Hiraike directed the series at EMT Squared. Miwa Oshima designed the characters. Crunchyroll streamed the anime. Each episode is approximately two minutes in length.

==== Episode list ====
No.	Official English title (Note: All English titles are taken from Crunchyroll.) Original Japanese title	Original release date
1	"Me and My Kitties" "Watashi to, nyanko-tachi" (私と、にゃんこ達)	January 8, 2017
Yuko spends a day in school and returns home to be greeted by her cats.
2	"Weekend with Cats 1" "Neko to no kyūjitsu 1" (ネコとの休日1)	January 15, 2017
Yuko is spending her weekend playing a video game and feeding her cats.
3	"Weekend with Cats 2" "Neko to no kyūjitsu 2" (ネコとの休日2)	January 22, 2017
Yuko takes her cats out for a walk and meets Azumi by accident.
4	"Yuko and Azumi" "Yūko to Azumi" (友子とあづみ)	January 29, 2017
Yuko tries to talk to Azumi at school.
5	"First Side Stop Together" "Hajimete no yorimichi" (はじめての寄り道)	February 5, 2017
Yuko and Azumi go to a coffee shop together after school.
6	"Azumi and Elza" "Azumi to eruza" (あずみとエルザ)	February 12, 2017
Azumi returns home and talks to Elza about her relationship with Yuko.
7	"The Cats' Day" "Neko-tachi no nichijō 1" (ネコたちの日常1)	February 19, 2017
Maa, Shii and Rou mimic Yuko's writing, studying and eating her snacks.
8	"The Cats' Day 2" "Neko-tachi no nichijō 2" (ネコたちの日常2)	February 26, 2017
Maa and Rou get into a fight over what to watch on TV. Their fight made Shii cry. Yuko returns home and fixes everything.
9	"Her Name Is Ran" "Sononaha, arashi" (その名は、嵐)	March 5, 2017
After the Midterm Exams, Iketani approaches Azumi, admits defeat and says that she is not going to lose in combined PE class marathon.
10	"Secrets and Tsundere" "Himitsu to tsundere" (秘密とツンデレ)	March 12, 2017
The combined PE class marathon begins and Yuko learns a secret about Iketani.
11	"Let's Go to the Festival" "Omatsuri ni ikōyo" (お祭りに行こうよ)	March 19, 2017
Yuko goes to the festival with her 3 cats. They meet Azumi and Elza there and decide to enjoy it together.
12	"With My Cats" "Nyanko-tachi to issho ni" (にゃんこ達と一緒に)	March 26, 2017
Maa and Elza got separated from Yuko and Azumi and start looking for them together.
