= Working!! =

Japanese comic strip manga series and its adaptations

- Cover of volume 1 of Working!!, published by Square Enix, featuring Popura Taneshima (center)
- Genre: Comedy; Slice of life
- Manga
- Written by: Karino Takatsu
- Published by: Square Enix
- Magazine: Young Gangan
- Original run: January 2005 – November 2014
- Volumes: 13
- Anime television series
- Directed by: Yoshimasa Hiraike
- Produced by: Hiroyuki Shimizu; Shunsuke Saito; Tomoyuki Saito
- Written by: Yoshimasa Hiraike
- Music by: Monaca
- Studio: A-1 Pictures
- Licensed by: NA: NIS America
- Original network: Tokyo MX, STV, Yomiuri TV
- Original run: April 4, 2010 – June 26, 2010
- Episodes: 13
- Anime television series

Working'!!
- Directed by: Atsushi Ootsuki
- Produced by: Hiroaki Tsunoda (Yomiuri TV); Hiroyuki Shimizu (Aniplex); Shunsuke Saito (Aniplex); Tomoyuki Saito (Yomiuri TV)
- Written by: Takao Yoshioka
- Music by: Monaca
- Studio: A-1 Pictures
- Licensed by: NA: NIS America
- Original network: Tokyo MX, Yomiuri TV
- Original run: October 1, 2011 – December 24, 2011
- Episodes: 13
- Anime television series

Working!!!
- Directed by: Yumi Kamakura
- Written by: Takao Yoshioka
- Music by: Monaca
- Studio: A-1 Pictures
- Licensed by: NA: Aniplex of America
- Original network: Tokyo MX, Yomiuri TV
- English network: Aniplex Channel
- Original run: July 4, 2015 – December 26, 2015
- Episodes: 14
- Manga

Web-ban Working!!
- Written by: Karino Takatsu
- Published by: Square Enix
- Original run: July 25, 2015 – April 25, 2017
- Volumes: 6
- Anime television series

WWW.Working!!
- Directed by: Yumi Kamakura
- Written by: Takao Yoshioka
- Music by: Masaru Yokoyama
- Studio: A-1 Pictures
- Licensed by: NA: Aniplex of America
- Original network: Tokyo MX
- English network: SEA: Animax Asia
- Original run: October 1, 2016 – December 24, 2016
- Episodes: 13

Working!!, released in the US as Wagnaria!!, is a Japanese four-panel comic strip written and illustrated by Karino Takatsu, which follows the activities of the unusual employees at one of the units of the Wagnaria family restaurant chain. The manga was serialized in Square Enix' Young Gangan seinen manga magazine between January 2005 and November 2014. Square Enix released three drama CDs between 2007 and 2009 with scripts written by Shōgo Mukai. An anime television series was produced by A-1 Pictures and directed by Yoshimasa Hiraike, airing in three seasons in 2010, 2011, and 2015 respectively. In North America, the first two anime seasons are licensed by NIS America while the third is licensed by Aniplex of America.

The series is a spin-off of an earlier webcomic of the same name, later published in print form as Web-ban Working!!, set in another Wagnaria restaurant and following a different group of characters. It was adapted into an anime series titled WWW.Working!! in 2016. It is licensed by Aniplex of America.

== Characters ==
=== Main series ===
==== Wagnaria employees ====
Sōta Takanashi (小鳥遊 宗太, Takanashi Sōta)
Voiced by: Kenichi Suzumura (drama CD), Jun Fukuyama (anime)
The main character of Working!!, Sōta is a 16-year-old high school student who was recruited to work at the family restaurant Wagnaria by Popura. He is enamored by small and cute things, and thus favors Popura over the other employees due to her cute appearance. Sōta occasionally voices his thoughts out loud and so offends his co-workers, who punish him in various ways. He was able to adapt quickly to his job at the restaurant and although he usually finds his co-workers and the rules of the restaurant to be strange, but he still has an attachment to his job. Sōta lives with his four sisters (three older and one younger). He expresses a dislike of older women, brought about by his treatment at the hands of his older sisters.
Popura Taneshima (種島 ぽぷら, Taneshima Popura)
Voiced by: Mai Kadowaki (drama CD), Kana Asumi (anime)
Popura is a short 17-year-old high school student who works at Wagnaria. She acts sensitive about her short stature, and many customers believe her to be younger than she really is. Popura admires Kotori, Sōta's cross-dressing persona, as well as the Takanashi sisters due to their tall and mature look. She is a hard worker, but she sometimes makes clumsy mistakes in her job. Despite that, Popura is chosen to replace Yachiyo as chief of staff near the end of the series.
Mahiru Inami (伊波 まひる, Inami Mahiru)
Voiced by: Mai Nakahara (drama CD), Saki Fujita (anime)
Mahiru is a timid 17-year-old girl who works at Wagnaria. She has androphobia and will punch any man who comes near her.
Kyouko Shirafuji (白藤 杏子, Shirafuji Kyouko)
Voiced by: Junko Minagawa (drama CD), Kumiko Watanabe (anime)
The manager of Wagnaria, Kyōko usually maintains a rather apathetic attitude towards the restaurant she runs and almost never bothers to do any work herself. Instead, she is seen constantly eating food such as Yachiyo's parfaits and Otoo's souvenirs. Kyōko does not use violence to deal with unruly customers and believes that employees come before the customers.
Yachiyo Todoroki (轟 八千代, Todoroki Yachiyo)
Voiced by: Shiho Kawaragi (drama CD), Eri Kitamura (anime)
Yachiyo is the 20-year-old chief of staff of Wagnaria. She usually carries around a katana which, according to her, was made by her parents who used to be blacksmiths. Yachiyo is unaware that some of the customers, and even Sōta, are intimidated by her blade. Sōta often addresses her as "Chief".
Jun Satō (佐藤 潤, Satō Jun)
Voiced by: Hirofumi Nojima (drama CD), Daisuke Ono (anime)
Jun is a helpful but intimidating 20-year-old chef who works in the kitchen. He is in love with Yachiyo, but has problems expressing it. However, because she is so devoted to Kyōko, she fails to recognize any of his hints.
Hiroomi Souma (相馬 博臣, Sōma Hiroomi)
Voiced by: Yoshinori Fujita (drama CD), Hiroshi Kamiya (anime)
Another chef who works in the kitchen, Hiroomi is a young man with an easygoing attitude. He often blackmails the other workers to do his job for him and passes it off as a form of modesty from the other employees.
Aoi Yamada (山田 葵, Yamada Aoi)
Voiced by: Kana Ueda (drama CD), Ryō Hirohashi (anime)
Aoi is a mysterious self-proclaimed 16-year-old girl whom Otoo meets on his travels to find his missing wife. She has great confidence in herself, but is an unhelpful troublemaker at work who gets yelled at by the other staff members, especially Sōta. Aoi is also bad with dealing with Sōta's constant complaints about her, but writes down some of his suggestions along with idle complaints.
Hyougo Otoo (音尾 兵吾, Otoo Hyōgo)
Voiced by: Daiki Nakamura (drama CD), Jouji Nakata (anime)
Otoo is the founder of the restaurant. He is away most of the time, searching for his missing wife, who apparently is so bad with directions that she got lost while running errands and is now wandering Japan.
Maya Matsumoto (松本 麻耶, Matsumoto Maya)
Voiced by: Akiko Kawase (anime)
Maya is an 18-year-old girl who works at Wagnaria and wears glasses. She claims to be a "normal person" striving to be completely ordinary in work and life in general. Maya has a hard time understanding the other employees, seeing how awkward all of them are, and tries not to be too familiar with them.

==== Takanashi family ====
Kazue Takanashi (小鳥遊 一枝, Takanashi Kazue)
Voiced by: Mabuki Andō (drama CD), Ryoko Shiraishi (anime)
Kazue is the eldest sister at age 31 who works as a lawyer. She is an expert in the law, and often uses it to her benefit in arguments in combination with violence and wordplay. Kazue seems to be serious and often ignores Sōta's viewpoints. She does get along with Izumi or Kozue, but cares for her family.
Izumi Takanashi (小鳥遊 泉, Takanashi Izumi)
Voiced by: Fumiko Orikasa (drama CD), Yoko Hikasa (anime)
Izumi is the second sister in the Takanashi family at age 28. Tall and slender, she is rarely shown standing and pays little attention to her exotic appearance.
Kozue Takanashi (小鳥遊 梢, Takanashi Kozue)
Voiced by: Akiko Kimura (drama CD), Shizuka Itō (anime)
Kozue is the third sister at age 25. Slightly shorter than Kazue, she is an aikido instructor.
Nazuna Takanashi (小鳥遊 なずな, Takanashi Nazuna)
Voiced by: Rie Kugimiya (drama CD), Momoko Saitō (anime)
Nazuna is the fourth sister and the youngest member in the Takanashi family at age 12. As an elementary school student, her lack of stamina makes it harder for her to stay up late at night.
Shizuka Takanashi (小鳥遊 静, Takanashi Shizuka)
Voiced by: Ai Orikasa
Shizuka is the widowed matriarch of the Takanashi family and a politician who barely appears at home due to work. She finally reveals herself in the final arc of the manga and in the last episode of the anime series. Shizuka is a manipulative and headstrong woman and the simple mention of her name is enough to have her children intimidated, except for Nazuna, who seems to have not known her enough yet.

==== Others ====
Mahiru's Father (まひるの父, Mahiru no Chichi)
Voiced by: Hōchū Ōtsuka (anime)
Mahiru's unnamed father who loves his daughter to the point of making up lies about males so that no boys would come near her. Out of jealousy, he told Mahiru that all men wanted to attack her so that she would fear them and never get married. He is the cause of Mahiru's androphobia and abnormal strength, having subtly trained her from birth, but this has also made him a target for her punching. Due to the possibility of getting hit at home, he lives and works by himself faraway, almost forgetting what Mahiru looks like. He seems to be calm and normal, but carries a rifle with him which he intends to use on boys who get too close to Mahiru.
Mahiru's Mother (まひるの母, Mahiru no Haha)
Voiced by: Masami Suzuki (anime)
Name unspecified. She does not appear to interfere with her husband's upbringing of their daughter.
Haruna Otoo (音尾 春菜, Otoo Haruna)
Voiced by: Junko Iwao (anime)
Haruna is Otoo's wife.
Yōhei Mashiba (真柴 陽平, Mashiba Yōhei)
Voiced by: Yūichi Nakamura (anime)
One of the members of Kyōko's old personal gang, Yōhei occasionally gets called in to help at the restaurant when staff are low. He is unemployed and does not get along with his twin sister, Mitsuki.
Mitsuki Mashiba (真柴 美月, Mashiba Mitsuki)
Voiced by: Haruka Tomatsu (anime)
Mitsuki is Yōhei's twin sister and another member of Kyōko's old gang. She works as an insurance agent and is easily embarrassed by her past looks. Mitsuki is also over-protective of Yachiyo, developing a dislike of Jun as a result of his romantic interest in Yachiyo as well as his correct assertion that Mitsuki's attitude towards Yachiyo is the reason why Yachiyo has not become self-sufficient.
Kirio Yamada (山田 桐生, Yamada Kirio)
Voiced by: Satoshi Hino (anime)
Kirio is Aoi's older brother who has been constantly searching for her. He shares his sister's eyes, dark purple hair and irises, and wears a white school uniform. Like Aoi, his surname is an alias which coincidentally matches hers. Kirio is the captain of a karate club and is strong enough to defend himself against Mahiru, who he gains a crush on.
Tōru Minegishi (峰岸 徹, Minegishi Tōru)
Voiced by: Kōji Yusa (anime)
Tōru is Kazue's ex-husband and childhood friend who works for Shizuka. Because of his constant masochistic tendencies, Kazue divorced him, although it has been hinted that she still has feelings for him (since he still blatantly loves her).
Izumi's Editor (編集者の泉の, Henshū-sha no Izumi)
Voiced by: Yoshitsugu Matsuoka (anime)
Izumi's novel editor who has to constantly deal with late entries from Izumi. She is seen late in the series when Izumi has to deal with Sōta realizing his feelings for Mahiru, which she believes will tear the family apart.

=== WWW.Working!! ===
==== Wagnaria employees ====
Daisuke Higashida (東田 大輔, Higashida Daisuke)
Voiced by: Yūichi Nakamura (drama CD, anime)
The main protagonist, Daisuke is a high school freshman who takes a part-time job at Wagnaria. He does not want to work, but is forced to take on a part-time job to pay for his personal costs after his father's business went bankrupt. Daisuke is an easily annoyed teenager, especially towards his carefree family and towards Miyakoshi's attempts at feeding him chocolate which always end on a disastrous note.
Hana Miyakoshi (宮越 華, Miyakoshi Hana)
Voiced by: Haruka Tomatsu (drama CD, anime)
A high school student, Hana tends to be strict and somewhat unfazed at the strange behavior of her co-workers, except when they fail to do their jobs properly. Hana tends to punch the manager in the face and encourages Higashida to do the same so he does not become as miserable as the manager. Despite being rough on the exterior, she can quickly change her personality to look friendlier (albeit to customers only). She enjoys making chocolates, although they are terrible enough to make people "meet Saint Valentine from down the Heavens".
Sayuri Muranushi (村主 さゆり, Muranushi Sayuri)
Voiced by: Yōko Hikasa (drama CD, anime)
Sayuri is a girl who shows little expression. For first unknown reasons, she serves an invisible "elder customer" despite the fact she claims to not believe in ghosts, making the issue even more confusing. However, it is eventually revealed she can see ghosts as she comes from a family of exorcists, but she simply refuses to believe in such phenomena. She rarely smiles and is said to leave "questionable reactions" on people who see it, with Adachi as one of the few witnesses.
Masahiro Adachi (足立 正広, Adachi Masahiro)
Voiced by: Kōki Uchiyama (drama CD, anime)
One of the cooks, he has black hair tied in a small ponytail. After he witnesses Sayuri smiling at him, he "suffers" from a fast heart beat everytime he sees her, and mistakes it as a curse.
Kisaki Kondō (近藤 妃, Kondō Kisaki)
Voiced by: Risa Taneda (first 3 drama CD), Nana Mizuki (drama CD volume 4 onward, anime)
A university student. She behaves and acts like a delinquent and does very little work. When people reprimand her for her conduct, she retorts with trivia questions that are normally left unanswered. Higashida is one of the few people able to respond to her trivia questions, leaving her surprised. She has a daughter whom she usually leaves with her mother who dotes on her granddaughter too much, and just like her mother, seems to be smart.
Shiho Kamakura (鎌倉 志保, Kamakura Shiho)
Voiced by: Sora Amamiya (drama CD, anime)
Shiho is the daughter of the owner of a large company who is always seen with a smile on her face. Spoiled, arrogant and materialistic, Shiho refers to the people as the "common masses" and often attempts to bribe people with money as her "apology". She has known Shindō since childhood and was rejected by him at some point, which he attributes as the reason of her working despite being economically rich. She frequently bullies and mistreats Shindō due to his previous rejection, using the fact that his father is debt with her father's company as leverage to torment him, despite the fact that she is still in love with him very much, but cannot express it properly.
Yūta Shindō (進藤 ユータ, Shindō Yūta)
Voiced by: Kenshō Ono (drama CD, anime), Ayaka Suwa (young, anime)
The son of a man whose business is in debt, so he works in several jobs, including delivering newspapers and being a host in order to pay the debt, making his situation somewhat similar to Higashida. He considers the job at Wagnaria the most important since he gets leftovers for free. His father's business is a butcher's shop whose display is rather gruesome. Shindō and Shiho have known each other since childhood and he rejected her. This event caused her to subsequently torment him as his father is debt with her father's company, and she uses this situation as leverage. He's very much oblivious to Shiho's lingering feelings for him, which causes her to bully him even further out of frustration.
Takuya Kōno (河野 拓哉, Kōno Takuya)
Voiced by: Hiro Shimono (anime)
One of the cooks, he has short blond hair and gets along with Adachi. Even though it's a waitress' job, Takuya is the one who makes parfait in the restaurant, thanks to Miyakoshi's terrifying cooking skills.
Kōki Saiki (斉木 恒輝, Saiki Kōki)
Voiced by: Yoshimasa Hosoya (anime)
Kōki is the newest employee at Wagnaria. Even though his parents are Japanese, he was raised abroad and initially does not speak Japanese, so he has Kisaki teach him even though he sometimes incorrectly pronounces words in Japanese.
Kenichirō Sakaki (榊 研一郎, Sakaki Kenichirō)
Voiced by: Kōsuke Toriumi (anime)
The manager of Wagnaria. Despite being the manager, he seems to lack actual education as he is unaware of how to write certain words properly or even resolve easy calculations without a calculator, and even then fails.

==== Others ====
Miri Yanagiba (柳葉 ミリ, Yanagiba Miri)
Voiced by: Momo Asakura (anime)
Higashida's classmate who never comes to school due to her illness. Is the granddaughter of the "elderly customer" only Muranashi can see.
Rui Nagata (永田 るい, Nagata Rui)
Voiced by: Ari Ozawa (anime)
Higashida's classmate who has a crush on him but misunderstands things easily.
Yōko Miyakoshi (宮越 葉子, Miyakoshi Yōko)
Voiced by: Mie Sonozaki (anime)
Hana's mother who is ironically a cooking expert despite her daughter's terrifying cooking skill, although she seems to be 'clumsy' as well. Because of her husband's habit of eating everything she cooks, he was diagnosed with diabetes, forcing him to live separately from her until his blood glucose level has dropped. Despite everything she says about her husband, she's totally in love with him.
Tasaka (田坂)
Voiced by: Kazuyuki Okitsu (anime)
One of Shiho's bodyguards. Even though he is Shiho's "bodyguard", he is actually tasked by Shiho's father to prevent Shiho's sadistic tendencies going too far and harming Yūta. He was Sakaki's junior in high school.
Daichi Saitō (斉藤 大地, Saitō Daichi)
Voiced by: Soma Saito, Lynn (young) (anime)
One of Shiho's bodyguards. He was Muranushi's classmate in elementary school and one of the few who witnessed her smile. This causes him to be afraid to look in people's eyes. He also developed a crush on her.

== Media ==
=== Manga ===
Working!! had its origins in a web comic written and illustrated by Karino Takatsu also called Working!!, which she published in irregular intervals on her personal website from 2002 to 2013. This web comic was published in print in six volumes from 2015 to 2017, under the title Web-ban Working!!. The web comic's setting and characters are different from the later four-panel comic strip manga, which was serialized from January 2005 to November 2014 issues of Square Enix's Young Gangan manga magazine. While the restaurant in the web comic and manga are both called Wagnaria, they are different branch stores, so the world is the same. For example, Kenichirō Sakaki (榊 研一郎, Sakaki Kenichrō), the web comic's store manager, is an old friend of Kyōko Shirafuji and Masahiro Adachi (足立 正広, Adachi Masahiro) from the web comic is a bandmate of Jun Satō from the Young Gangan version. The author called the web comic version Cat Group (猫組, Neko-gumi) and the serialized manga version Dog Group (犬組, Inu-gumi). Square Enix published 13 tankōbon volumes between November 25, 2005, and December 25, 2014. Ten additional chapters have been released via mobile phones. The manga has been licensed for release in Mandarin in Taiwan by Tong Li Publishing. Takatsu launched a biweekly web version of Working!! on October 16, 2009, to commemorate the anime series and posts the manga on the anime's official website.

=== Drama CDs and radio show ===
Square Enix released three drama CDs under the title Young Gangan Book In CD Working!!, with scenarios written by Shōgo Mukai. The first volume, released on January 25, 2007, came bundled with a 96-page booklet with bonus manga and the scenario included. The second and third volumes, released on April 25, 2008, and March 25, 2009, respectively, also came bundled with similar booklets. The voice acting cast for the anime is different from the drama CDs.

An Internet radio show to promote the anime series titled Yamaking!! aired 13 episodes between May 21 and October 29, 2010, and was hosted by Ryō Hirohashi, the voice actress of Aoi Yamada. The show restarted with the title Yamaking'!! on October 7, 2011.

=== Anime ===
The first season of the anime, consisting of 13 episodes, is produced by A-1 Pictures and directed by Yoshimasa Hiraike. It aired in Japan between April 4 and June 26, 2010, on Tokyo MX, with the first episode having a special pre-broadcast on March 6, 2010, on Tokyo MX. NIS America licensed the anime under the title Wagnaria!!, and an English-subtitled DVD box set was released on March 24, 2011. The anime's opening theme is "Someone Else" by Kana Asumi, Saki Fujita and Eri Kitamura (the three female leads). The ending theme is "Heart no Edge ni Idomō" (ハートのエッジに挑もう, Haato Ejji ni Idomō; Go to Heart Edge) by Jun Fukuyama, Daisuke Ono, and Hiroshi Kamiya (the three lead men). The special ending theme for episode nine is "Golden Day" (ゴールデン・デイ, Goruden Dei) by Saki Fujita.

A second season, titled Working'!! (with an apostrophe), began airing on October 1, 2011, after a September 3, 2011 preview airing. Crunchyroll did a simulcast of the series. The second season's opening theme is "Coolish Walk" by Asumi, Fujita and Kitamura, while the ending theme is "Always Love&Peace!!" (いつものようにLOVE&PEACE!!, Itsumo no Yōni Love & Peace!!) by Fukuyama, Ono and Kamiya.

A third anime season titled Working!!! premiered on July 4, 2015. It is also streamed online with English subtitles on Aniplex Channel, Crunchyroll, Hulu, Daisuki and Viewster. The third season's opening theme is "Now!!! Gamble" by Asumi, Fujita and Kitamura, while the ending theme is "Matsuge ni Lock" (まつ毛にLOCK; Lock with Your Eyelashes) by Fukuyama, Ono and Kamiya.

WWW.Working!!, an anime adaptation of Web-ban Working!!, the print release of the webcomic predecessor of the manga, premiered on October 1, 2016, on Tokyo MX and other television networks. A-1 Pictures and Yumi Kamakura returned to produce and direct the series, respectively. The opening theme song, titled "Eyecatch! Too Much!", is performed by Haruka Tomatsu, Yōko Hikasa and Sora Amamiya. The ending theme song, titled "Mujūryoku Fever" (無重力Fever; No Weight Fever), is performed by Yūichi Nakamura, Kōki Uchiyama, and Kenshō Ono. WWW.Working!! is licensed in North America by Aniplex of America. It ran on Animax Asia from October 1, 2016, to December 24, 2016.

== Reception ==
The fourth manga volume of Working!! was the seventh highest-selling manga volume in Japan for the week of October 23–29, 2007. The sixth manga volume was the sixth-highest selling manga volume in Japan for the week of March 24–30, 2009, having sold over 73,000 volumes that week.

== See also ==
- Servant × Service, a manga by the same author
