= My Lovey-Dovey Wife Is a Stone Cold Killer =

Japanese manga series

- First tankōbon volume cover, featuring Setsuna

拝啓…殺し屋さんと結婚しました (Haikei... Koroshiya-san to Kekkon Shimashita)
- Genre: Romantic comedy
- Manga
- Written by: Donten Kōsaka
- Published by: Media Factory
- English publisher: NA: Seven Seas Entertainment
- Imprint: MFC Cune Series
- Magazine: Comic Cune
- Original run: September 27, 2019 – present
- Volumes: 9

My Lovey-Dovey Wife Is a Stone Cold Killer (拝啓... 殺し屋さんと結婚しました, Haikei... Koroshiya-san to Kekkon Shimashita), also known as Dear Sir... I Married a Killer, is a Japanese manga series written and illustrated by Donten Kōsaka. It began serialization in Media Factory's Comic Cune magazine in September 2019, and has been compiled into nine volumes as of September 2026. The series is licensed in North America by Seven Seas Entertainment.

== Plot ==
The series follows a salaryman who recently married Setsuna, a professional assassin. Having only dated for a short time prior to their marriage, he is surprised to learn of her background. Despite this, he comes to accept her work. The story follows the couple as they balance married life with Setsuna's job as a hitman.

== Characters ==
Husband (旦那, Danna)
Voiced by: Yūya Hirose (voice comic)
The unnamed protagonist, he is a salaryman who met Setsuna after they were introduced by a mutual friend. Because they only met a few times before they started dating, he did not know about her job as an assassin. Although they are already a couple, he is still not used to married life.
Setsuna (せつな)
Voiced by: Marika Kōno (voice comic)
A professional assassin who had just recently married. She met her husband after their mutual friend invited them to a drinking party. She is proficient both as a hitman and at household chores. Because of her work, she assumes a cold personality, although she warms up as her relationship with her husband develops.
Otonari-san (音成さん)
Voiced by: Mai Fuchigami (voice comic)
Setsuna and her husband's next-door neighbor. Her name is a play on the Japanese word for next-door neighbor, otonari-san (お隣さん).

== Publication ==
The series is written and illustrated by Donten Kōsaka. It began serialization in the November 2019 issue of Media Factory's Comic Cune magazine, released on September 27, 2019. The first tankōbon was released on May 27, 2020. The series has been compiled into nine volumes as of September 26, 2026. A voice comic was posted on YouTube on September 27, 2021, to commemorate the release of the third volume.

The series is licensed in North America by Seven Seas Entertainment, with the first English volume being released on November 23, 2021.

=== Volumes ===
No.	Original release date	Original ISBN	English release date	English ISBN
1	May 27, 2020	978-4-04-064617-6	November 23, 2021	978-1-64827-680-4
Chapters 1–8; Bonus Chapter (描き下ろし漫画, Kakioroshi Manga)
2	January 27, 2021	978-4-04-680101-2	March 1, 2022	978-1-63858-142-0
Chapters 9–16
3	September 27, 2021	978-4-04-680746-5	July 19, 2022	978-1-63858-342-4
Chapters 17–24
4	June 27, 2022	978-4-04-681440-1	April 25, 2023	978-1-63858-837-5
Chapters 25–32
5	February 27, 2023	978-4-04-682145-4	October 24, 2023	979-8-88843-029-3
Chapters 33–40
6	November 27, 2023	978-4-04-683030-2	May 21, 2024	979-8-88843-768-1
Chapters 41–48
7	September 27, 2024	978-4-04-683958-9	May 13, 2025	979-8-89160-646-3
Chapters 49–56
8	September 27, 2025	978-4-04-685074-4	April 28, 2026	979-8-89561-696-3
Chapters 57–67
9	September 26, 2026	978-4-04-660598-6	—	—
