= Hinako Note =

Japanese manga series

- Cover of Hinako Note volume 1 by Media Factory featuring the protagonist Hinako

ひなこのーと (Hinako Nōto)
- Genre: Slice of life
- Manga
- Written by: Mitsuki
- Published by: Media Factory
- Magazine: Comic Cune
- Original run: August 2014 – January 27, 2021
- Volumes: 7
- Anime television series
- Directed by: Takeo Takahashi (Note: Chief Director (総監督)); Hijiri Sanpei (Note: Chief Director (チーフディレクター)); Tooru Kitahata
- Produced by: Shō Tanaka; Takumi Yamamoto; Noritomo Isogai; Ichigo Yamada; Yuki Kurosaki
- Written by: Tatsuhiko Urahata
- Music by: Yukari Hashimoto
- Studio: Passione
- Licensed by: Crunchyroll; SA/SEA: Medialink
- Original network: AT-X, BS11, Tokyo MX, KBS, TV Aichi, TVQ, Sun TV
- Original run: April 7, 2017 – June 23, 2017
- Episodes: 12

Hinako Note (ひなこのーと, Hinako Nōto) is a Japanese four-panel manga series by Mitsuki. It has been serialized since August 2014 in Media Factory's seinen manga magazine Comic Cune, which was originally a magazine supplement in the seinen manga magazine Monthly Comic Alive until August 2015. Seven tankōbon volumes of the manga were released between August 27, 2015, and March 27, 2021. Hinako Note is also available on Kadokawa Corporation's ComicWalker website. An anime television series adaptation by Passione aired in Japan between April and June 2017.

== Plot ==
Having always had an interest in theater but struggling to talk with others, Hinako Sakuragi moves to Tokyo to attend Fujiyama High School, staying as a resident at the Hitotose book store. Upon learning that the school's theater club is actually on hiatus, Hinako and the other residents form their own theater troupe.

== Characters ==
Hinako Sakuragi (桜木 ひなこ, Sakuragi Hinako)
Voiced by: M.A.O
A first year high school girl who moves to Tokyo in the hopes of joining a theater club. She is friendly with animals but struggled with talking to other people, often winding up in a scarecrow-like pose.
Kuina Natsukawa (夏川 くいな, Natsukawa Kuina)
Voiced by: Miyu Tomita
Kuina is a first year high school girl who works at the Hitotose book store. She has a heavy appetite and will occasionally eat pages from the store's books.
Mayuki Hiiragi (柊 真雪, Hiiragi Mayuki)
Voiced by: Yui Ogura
Mayuki is a second year high school girl who works in Hitotose's coffee shop, often dressed in maid attire. Despite being older than Hinako and Kuina, she often acts like an elementary school student.
Chiaki Hagino (萩野 千秋, Hagino Chiaki)
Voiced by: Hisako Tōjō
Chiaki is a second year high school girl who is a member of the currently-on-hiatus theater club and landlady of Hitotose Manor.
Yua Nakajima (中島 ゆあ, Nakajima Yua)
Voiced by: Marika Kōno
Yua is Hinako's classmate who strongly loves Chiaki and often had a one-sided rivalry with Hinako.
Ruriko Kuroyanagi (黒柳 るり子, Kuroyanagi Ruriko)
Voiced by: Yu-ri Yoshida
Ruriko is a nine-year-old child actress and the advisor of the theater club.
Bard (鳥太郎, Toritaro)
Voiced by: Shinya Takahashi

== Media ==
=== Manga ===
Hinako Note is a four-panel manga series by Mitsuki, a Japanese manga artist who mainly draws adult comics. It began serialization in Comic Cune's October 2014 issue released on August 27, 2014; At first, Comic Cune was a "magazine within a magazine" placed in Monthly Comic Alive, later it became independent of Comic Alive and changed to a formal magazine on August 27, 2015. Hinako Note is also available on Kadokawa Corporation's ComicWalker website. Seven tankōbon volumes of the manga were released between August 27, 2015, and March 27, 2021. The series ended on January 27, 2021.

=== Anime ===
An anime television series adaptation by Passione was announced. The series is directed by Toru Kitahata, with Takeo Takahashi credited as chief director. A key visual was unveiled on March 21, 2017. The anime aired in Japan between April 7 and June 23, 2017, and was simulcast by Crunchyroll. The series ran for 12 episodes. The opening and ending themes respectively are "A-E-I-U-E-O Ao!!" (あ・え・い・う・え・お・あお!!) and "Curtain Call!!!!!" (かーてんこーる!!!!!, Kāten Kōru!!!!!), both performed by Gekidan Hitotose (M.A.O, Miyu Tomita, Yui Ogura, Hisako Tōjō, and Marika Kōno).

No.	Title (Note: All English titles are taken from Crunchyroll.)	Original air date
1	"My Talent Is Being a Scarecrow"; Transliteration: "Tokugi wa, Kakashi desu" (Japanese: とくぎは、かかしです)	April 7, 2017
Hinako Sakuragi, a girl who struggles with talking to others, moves into the Hitotose bookstore in Tokyo, meeting two of its residents; Kuina Natugawa, who has a habit of eating books, and Mayuki Hiiragi, who likes dressing as a maid. Having come to Tokyo in hope of joining her Fujimiya High School's theater club, Hinako is shocked to learn that the club has apparently been shut down. As Kuina and Mayuki take Hinako to the park to cheer her up, they come across the landlady, Chiaki Ogino, who explains how the theater club is on hiatus due to the advisor being away. Noticing Hinako's interest in theater, Chiaki suggests that they all start up a theater troupe together.
2	"It Begins Here"; Transliteration: "Koko Kara Hajimaru" (Japanese: ここからはじまる)	April 14, 2017
Hinako recalls how she always used to serve as a makeshift scarecrow for the local farmers, struggling to properly thank them for the vegetables she received in return. Hearing how Hinako wants to theater to become better at speaking, Chiaki suggests that she start off the theater troupe as its principal in lieu of working in the shop. After naming their group the Hitotose Troupe, the girls set a goal to one day perform at the Suzuran theater.
3	"Mistaken Friend"; Transliteration: "Tomodachi Kanchigai" (Japanese: ともだちかんちがい)	April 21, 2017
As Hinako struggles to talk with others on her first day of school, Chiaki's friends put together a theater society to replace the on-hiatus club, with Chiaki inviting Hinako and Kuina to join. This attracts the attention of their classmate, Yua Nakajima, who becomes envious of how close Hinako is to Chiaki and joins the society too. Wanting to prove her superiority, Yua keeps stepping in whenever Hinako is asked to do something, which Hinako interprets as an act of kindness. The next day, Hinako tries working in the coffee shop with Mayuki, during which she manages to help a lost girl get in touch with her mother. Encouraged by the experience, Hinako asks Yua to be her friend.
4	"Scarecrow Heroine"; Transliteration: "Kakashi Hiroin" (Japanese: かかしひろいん)	April 28, 2017
Child actress Ruriko Kuroyanagi, who was the theater club's advisor before putting it on hiatus, returns from overseas training to help the society prepare for the upcoming culture festival. Meanwhile, Mayuki ends up gaining attention with her dancing while Hinako manages to express a talent for singing. Later, Mayuki explains that she doesn't care much for theater as it takes too much of Chiaki's attention away from her. The next day, Ruriko chooses Hinako as the heroine for her play, despite her still being nervous about performing.
5	"A Kind Girl Who Isn't Kind"; Transliteration: "Yasashikunai Yasashii Ko" (Japanese: やさしくないやさしいこ)	May 5, 2017
Yua gets increasingly annoyed at Hinako due to her clumsiness in dance practice and her closeness to Chiaki. Afterwards, Hinako tries imitating some animals in order to broaden her range of expressions. Later, Yua spies on the girls in the park as they help Hinako with her practise, admiring her determination and helping out herself.
6	"Maids, Ghosts, and the Stage of Dreams"; Transliteration: "Meido to Obake to Yume no Butai" (Japanese: めいどとおばけとゆめのぶたい)	May 12, 2017
With one day left until the culture festival, Hinako is surprised to learn Chiaki won't be acting in the play, as she wanted to give the new members a chance to shine, but manages to give a successful rehearsal. On the day of the festival, Hinako ends up forgetting all of her lines as a result of trying to learn everyone else', so Yua and Kuina give her some last minute practice. During the play, Yua ends up forgetting a prop handkerchief, but Hinako and Mayuki manage to help work in a replacement, leading the play to become a success. Afterwards, Ruriko and Yua offer to help Hinako with the Hitotose Theater Troupe.
7	"The Lost Swimsuit"; Transliteration: "Mayoeru Mizugi" (Japanese: まよえるみずぎ)	May 19, 2017
Upon making plans to go to the beach, the girls go to a department store to pick out swimsuits. While at the beach, Mayuki gets lost and comes across Ruriko, who tries to help her find her way back. As Hinako goes off to search for Mayuki, her animal magnetism helps Mayuki find her and join up with the others.
8	"Trying Too Hard"; Transliteration: "Ganbari Sugite" (Japanese: がんばりすぎて)	May 26, 2017
Yua pays a visit to Hitotose to lend Hinako some acting DVDs, only to discover she doesn't have a DVD player. Later, Hinako catches a cold from overworking herself, so the others try to help cure it.
9	"We'll Have a Training Camp"; Transliteration: "Gasshuku Shimasu" (Japanese: がっしゅくします)	June 2, 2017
While Hinako is worried about her mother coming to visit, the girls try to come up with a play to draw customers to the Hitotose during a stamp rally event. Upon hearing their plans, Ruriko arranges for the girls to have an overnight training camp at school to practise. During the night, Hinako and Yua sense a mysterious figure in the darkness, which they discover to be a stray cat.
10	"Pa-Pa-Parade"; Transliteration: "Pa-Pa-Pareido" (Japanese: ぱぱぱれいど)	June 9, 2017
After Kuina finished her script for Troupe Hitotose's place, Mayuki has everyone try out costumes she has made. On the day of the performance, both Hinako and Ruriko's mothers come to watch, putting further pressure on Hinako. With support from her friends, however, the play manages to be a success.
11	"From One Year to the Next"; Transliteration: "Yukutoshi Kurutoshi" (Japanese: ゆくとしくるとし)	June 16, 2017
The girls decide to put together a play of A Christmas Carol for Christmas Eve, which proves popular thanks to Hinako calling in a real deer. Later at the start of the new year, as Kuina and Mayuki go to visit their families, Hinako and Yua joins Chiaki in helping out at the shrine.
12	"The Place We Longed to Reach"; Transliteration: "Akogare no Basho" (Japanese: あこがれのばしょ)	June 23, 2017
Hinako becomes anxious after walking in on Mayuki cooking something mysterious for Chiaki late at night, which just turns out to be Valentine's chocolate. On Valentine's Day, Yua tries to work up the courage to give Chiaki her handmade chocolates. The next day, Chiaki invites everyone to a play being held near Suzuran, which they pay a visit to.

== Reception ==
=== Previews ===
Anime News Network had five editors review the first episode of the anime: Rebecca Silverman was critical of Hinako's scarecrow act feeling false when socializing with people but was intrigued by where it will go in later episodes when the theatre stuff begins; Lynzee Loveridge noted how the production focused on its cast delivering harmless cute antics found in similar anime, crediting the decent chemistry but found it lacking in both comedy and dramatic development, saying it will fulfill its given niche and garner a small following that bought merch related to it; Nick Creamer was generally unimpressed by the adaptation's "rote basics" of the subgenre it occupies, highlighting the overused jokes and middling atmosphere that encompassed the episode, calling it "a passable effort for genre enthusiasts" but nothing more; Paul Jensen also noticed the usual slice-of-life trappings throughout the episode, pointing out the vibrant animation and "mildly amusing" cast of adorable female characters but felt it was missing a "spark of creativity" to put it above the other all-girl comedy shows that came out in previous seasons, saying its "merely competent on a basic level." The fifth reviewer, Theron Martin, saw potential in the series with its main heroine Hinako overcoming her social anxiety through theatre and also gave praise to both studio Passione and director Takeo Takahashi for making a "creative departure" from their comfort zone to create an opener with solid delivery in both its aesthetic and humor, concluding that: "I probably won't watch any more, as this series isn't my kind of thing, but it looks quite promising for those who do like such fare."

=== Series ===
Stig Høgset, writing for THEM Anime Reviews, commended the "generally fine" animation for making the character designs "downright adorable" when being adorn with various dress styles but was critical of the lazy humor delivered by the cast, lack of focus on acting, and the leering fanservice interrupting the show's overall moe vibe, calling it: "Visually pleasing, and funny maybe once or twice per episode, but otherwise dry, uninteresting and underwhelming."
