= Pan de Peace! =

Japanese manga and anime series

- Cover of the first volume featuring Minami Tani

パンでPeace!
- Genre: Comedy
- Manga
- Written by: Emily
- Published by: Media Factory
- Magazine: Comic Cune
- Original run: August 27, 2014 – November 27, 2017
- Volumes: 5
- Anime television series
- Directed by: Hatsuki Tsuji
- Written by: Momoko Murakami
- Studio: Asahi Production
- Licensed by: Crunchyroll
- Original network: Animax
- Original run: April 4, 2016 – June 27, 2016
- Episodes: 13

Pan de Peace! (パンでPeace!; lit. 'Peace Through Bread!') is a Japanese four-panel manga series written and illustrated by Emily (styled as "emily"). It had been printed in Media Factory's Comic Cune magazine since August 2014 and the chapters have been collected into five tankōbon volumes. An anime television series adaptation by Asahi Production aired in Japan from April to June 2016.

== Plot ==
The series follows Minami, a young teenage girl who loves bread, as she befriends her new classmates in her first year of high school and bonds with them over bread.

== Characters ==
Minami Tani (谷 みなみ, Tani Minami)
Voiced by: Ibuki Kido
Minami is the outgoing and happy-go-lucky main protagonist of the series who loves egg sandwiches.
Yū Aizawa (逢沢 ゆう, Aizawa Yū)
Voiced by: Erii Yamazaki
Yū is the first friend Minami made at school after admiring Yū's bread keychains on her bag. She is a shy girl who loves curry bread. Her hobby is drawing, but Yū is too embarrassed to reveal it.
Fuyumi Fukagawa (深川 ふゆみ, Fukagawa Fuyumi)
Voiced by: Moe Toyota
Fuyumi is Minami's friend whose family runs a bakery called Fuwa Fuyu.
Noa Sakura (佐倉 のあ, Sakura Noa)
Voiced by: Nichika Ōmori
Noa is the shortest girl with a petite build. Her favorite kind of bread are baguettes, which she occasionally uses as weapon to defend herself from physical contact.
Ami Sakura (佐倉 あみ, Sakura Ami)
Voiced by: Natsuko Hara
Ami is Noa's little sister.
Mai Kawai (河合 まい, Kawai Mai)
Voiced by: Madoka Asahina
Mai is the owner of Guillame French Bakery whom Noa is close to.
Mana Kawai (河合 まな, Kawai Mana)
Mana is Mai's older sister.

== Media ==
=== Manga ===
Pan de Peace! began in Comic Cune's October 2014 issue released on August 27, 2014. At first, Comic Cune was a "magazine in magazine" placed in Monthly Comic Alive, later it became independent of Comic Alive and changed to a formal magazine on August 27, 2015. Pan de Peace! is also available on Kadokawa Corporation's ComicWalker website. It ended on November 27, 2017, in the January issue. Five tankōbon volumes of the manga were released as of December 2017 in Japan.

=== Anime ===
An anime television series produced by Asahi Production aired in Japan between April 4, 2016, and June 27, 2016. Hatsuki Tsuji directed the series at Asahi Production. Momoko Murakami is in charge of series composition, and Shizue Kaneko designed the characters. It was simulcast by Crunchyroll. The opening theme is "Seishun wa Tabemono desu" (青春は食べ物です, Youth is Food) by Petit Milady.

==== Episode list ====
No.	Title	Original release date
1	"I Made Bread Buddies" "Pan-tomo ga Dekimashita" (パン友ができました)	April 4, 2016
On her first day of school, Minami Tani – a girl who is obsessed with bread – befriends her classmates, Yuu Aizawa and Fuyumi Fukagawa.
2	"This is a Weapon" "Kore wa Buki" (これは武器)	April 11, 2016
Fuyumi introduces her friend, Noa Sakura, who looks and acts childish despite being the same age.
3	"Fuwa Fuyu Bakery" "Fuwa Fuyu Bēkarī" (ふわふゆベーカリー)	April 18, 2016
The girls visit Fuyumi's family bakery, where they try some of their special breads before trying their hand at baking their own.
4	"In Pursuit of the Fabled Bread" "Maboroshi no Pan o Motomete" (幻のパンを求めて)	April 25, 2016
The girls go to the school store to try and obtain a limited ciabatta sandwich.
5	"Yū-chan's Dream" "Yū-chan no Yume" (ゆうちゃんの夢)	May 2, 2016
Yū talks about her dreams of becoming a manga artist.
6	"Fuyumi-chan's Diet" "Fuyumi-chan Daietto" (ふゆみちゃんダイエット)	May 9, 2016
The girls try to help Fuyumi lose weight by making miniature melon pan.
7	"The Sick Noa-chan!" "Kazehiki! Noa-chan" (風邪ひき!のあちゃん)	May 16, 2016
The girls visit Noa, who is sick with a cold, and meet her little sister Ami.
8	"The New Bakery" "Atarashī Pan'ya-san" (新しいパン屋さん)	May 23, 2016
Noa visits Guillame French Bakery, where she befriends a girl named Mai Kawai, prompting some jealousy from Fuyumi.
9	"The Cultural Festival" "Bunkasai" (文化祭)	May 30, 2016
The girls opens a maid café at their school's culture festival, where Mai pays a visit.
10	"Intriguing Girl" "Kininaru Hito" (気になる人)	June 6, 2016
Mai visits Fuwa Fuyu Bakery, where she and Fuyumi find some common interests.
11	"Let's Swimming" "Rettsu Suimingu" (レッツスイミング)	June 13, 2016
The girls go to the pool to teach Noa and Yuu how to swim, unaware that Mai cannot swim either.
12	"Slumber Party at the Vacation Home" "Bessō de Otomarikai" (別荘でお泊まり会)	June 20, 2016
The girls are invited to stay over at Mai's holiday home.
13	"Pan de Peace!" (パンでPeace!)	June 27, 2016
The girls recall all memories they made thanks to their love of bread.
