= Cheerful Amnesia =

Japanese manga series

- Cover of the first Japanese volume

明るい記憶喪失 (Akarui Kioku Soushitsu)
- Genre: Romantic comedy; Yuri
- Manga
- Written by: Tamamushi Oku
- Published by: Media Factory
- English publisher: NA: Yen Press
- Magazine: Comic Cune
- Original run: June 27, 2016 – December 26, 2020
- Volumes: 6

Cheerful Amnesia (Japanese: 明るい記憶喪失, Hepburn: Akarui Kioku Soushitsu) is a Japanese yuri manga written and illustrated by Tamamushi Oku. It was serialized in Media Factory's Comic Cune from June 2016, to December 2020, and is licensed in English by Yen Press.

The series follows Arisa, an amnesiac who is excited to experience dating her girlfriend after having forgotten all their time together.

== Synopsis ==
After Arisa loses her memory of the past few years due to amnesia, her girlfriend Mari worries what that will mean for their relationship. However Arisa is not bothered by her amnesia, instead she is excited to once again experience all the first times that happen between girlfriends.

== Publication ==
Written and illustrated by Tamamushi Oku, Cheerful Amnesia was serialized in Media Factory's Comic Cune magazine from June 27, 2016, to December 26, 2020. The series was collected in six tankōbon volumes from February 27, 2017, to January 27, 2021.

The series is licensed for an English release in North America by Yen Press.

No.	Original release date	Original ISBN	English release date	English ISBN
1	February 27, 2017	978-4-04-069026-1	October 24, 2023	978-1-9753-6987-3
2	September 27, 2017	978-4-04-069429-0	February 20, 2024	978-1-9753-6989-7
3	March 26, 2018	978-4-04-069782-6	June 18, 2024	978-1-9753-6991-0
4	February 27, 2019	978-4-04-065480-5	September 17, 2024	978-1-9753-6993-4
5	February 28, 2020	978-4-04-064360-1	January 21, 2025	978-1-9753-6995-8
6	January 27, 2021	978-4-04-680100-5	May 27, 2025	978-1-9753-6997-2

== Reception ==
For Anime News Network's Fall 2023 Manga Guide, Rebecca Silverman gave the first volume a 3 out of 5, noting that "the four-panel format works well here, although the humor does rely on a lot of repetition that can get a little old.", while Christopher Farris gave it a 3.5 out of 5, summarizing "there should be a place for lesbian love stories to have their own shamelessly stupid, kinda-horny comedies, and Cheerful Amnesia fills that role enjoyably enough." Erica Friedman, the founder of Yuricon, was less favourable towards the premise of the series, noting that "this series could read like a very fun, goofy 4-koma, if one read a page or two at a time. As a volume, I felt so desperately sad for Mari who has the body of her lover back, with the soul of a gaping child inhabiting it."
