= Miyu Tomita =

Japanese voice actress and singer

- 富田 美憂
- Born: November 15, 1999 (age 27); Saitama Prefecture, Japan
- Occupations: Voice actress; singer
- Years active: 2015–present
- Agent: Amuse
- Notable work: Please Tell Me! Galko-chan as Otako; Aikatsu Stars! as Yume Nijino; Gabriel DropOut as Gabriel White Tenma; Made in Abyss as Riko; Kaguya-sama: Love Is War as Miko Iino; We Never Learn as Rizu Ogata; After School Dice Club as Midori Ono; Interspecies Reviewers as Crimvael; Iwa-Kakeru! -Sport Climbing Girls- as Nonoka Sugiura; Otherside Picnic as Akari Seto; The Hidden Dungeon Only I Can Enter as Emma Brightness; Combatants Will Be Dispatched! as Alice Kisaragi; Mobile Suit Gundam: The Witch from Mercury as Chuatury "Chuchu" Panlunch; Ayakashi Triangle as Matsuri Kazamaki (female); The 100 Girlfriends Who Really, Really, Really, Really, Really Love You as Karane Inda
- Height: 153 cm (5 ft 0 in)
- Musical career
- Genres: J-pop; anison
- Instrument: Vocals
- Years active: 2019–present
- Label: Nippon Columbia
- Website: columbia.jp/tomitamiyu/

Miyu Tomita (富田 美憂, Tomita Miyū; born November 15, 1999) is a Japanese voice actress and singer. She is signed to Amuse. After aspiring to become a voice actress while studying in elementary school, she participated in two voice acting auditions in 2014, winning one of them. Some of her roles include Otako in Please Tell Me! Galko-chan, Yume Nijino in Aikatsu Stars!, Gabriel White Tenma in Gabriel DropOut, Riko in Made in Abyss, Rizu Ogata in We Never Learn, Miko Iino in Kaguya-sama: Love Is War, Chuatury "Chuchu" Panlunch in Mobile Suit Gundam: The Witch from Mercury, Matsuri Kazamaki (female) in Ayakashi Triangle, and Karane Inda in The 100 Girlfriends Who Really, Really, Really, Really, Really Love You.

== Biography ==
Tomita was born in Saitama Prefecture on November 15, 1999. She first became interested in voice acting while in elementary school, after watching the anime series Vampire Knight. She also became a fan of voice actor Mamoru Miyano during this time. During her high school days, she was a member of her school's manga research club. In addition to her interest in voice acting, Tomita won a black belt after training in karate for six years. She was a finalist in the Ani-Tan voice acting audition held in 2014, and in the same year won the Grand Prix at the 2014 Voice Actor Artist Development Program Selection audition. She debuted as a voice actress in 2015, voicing a number of minor roles in the anime television series Himouto! Umaru-chan, including voicing the protagonist Taihei Doma during a flashback.

In 2016, Tomita was cast in her first major role as Otako in the anime series Please Tell Me! Galko-chan, where she also performed the opening theme together with Azumi Waki and Minami Takahashi. She was also cast as the character Yume Nijino in the anime television series Aikatsu Stars!, where she narrated a commercial for the series. During the same year, she was also cast in the anime film Garo: Divine Flame as Roberto Lewis. In 2017, Tomita starred in the anime series Gabriel DropOut. Together with co-stars Saori Ōnishi, Naomi Ōzora, and Kana Hanazawa, she performed the opening theme "Gabriel Dropkick" and ending theme "Hallelujah Essaim". Tomita voiced Kuina Natsugawa in the anime television series Hinako Note. She made her major debut as a singer under Nippon Columbia with the release of the single "Present Moment" on November 25, 2019. The title song is used as the opening theme to the anime series After School Dice Club. Her official fanclub, "+ you" (pronounced "plus you"), was launched on the same day as the launch of her first album, Prologue, on June 30, 2021.

== Filmography ==
=== Anime ===
Year	Title	Role	Ref.
2015	Is the Order a Rabbit??	classmate A (episode 8)	
2015	Himouto! Umaru-chan	Taihei Doma (young, episode 7), female student	
2015	Please Tell Me! Galko-chan	Otako	
2015	Aikatsu Stars!	Yume Nijino	
2017	Gabriel DropOut	Gabriel White Tenma	
2017	Hinako Note	Kuina Natsukawa	
2017	Made in Abyss	Riko	
2017	Garo: Vanishing Line	Luke (child)	
2018
2018	Overlord II	Tina	
2018	Holmes of Kyoto	Aoi Mashiro	
2018	Ms. Vampire Who Lives in My Neighborhood	Sophie Twilight	
2019	* The Magnificent Kotobuki	Chika	
2019	We Never Learn	Rizu Ogata	
2019	Wasteful Days of High School Girls	Minami "Yamai" Yamamoto	
2019	After School Dice Club	Midori Ono	
2019	Aikatsu on Parade!	Yume Nijino	
2019	Z/X Code reunion	Yuni Tsukigata	
2020	Haikyū!!	Akane Yamamoto	
2020	Hatena Illusion	Yumemi Hoshisato	
2020	A Certain Scientific Railgun T	Mitori Kōzaku	
2020	Interspecies Reviewers	Crimvael	
2020	Dorohedoro	Ebisu	
2020	Tamayomi	Ibuki Kawaguchi	
2020	Kaguya-sama: Love Is War?	Miko Iino	
2020	Iwa-Kakeru! -Sport Climbing Girls-	Nonoka Sugiura	
2020	One Room Third Season	Akira Kotokawa	
2020	Kuma Kuma Kuma Bear	Shuri	
2020	Talentless Nana	Yūka Sasaki	
2020	Dogeza: I Tried Asking While Kowtowing	Kanan Misenai, Rei Shioya	
2021	Otherside Picnic	Akari Seto	
2021	The Hidden Dungeon Only I Can Enter	Emma Brightness	
2021	Ex-Arm	Yggdrasil	
2021	Vivy: Fluorite Eye's Song	Momoka Kirishima	
2021	Combatants Will Be Dispatched!	Alice Kisaragi	
2021	Battle Athletes Victory ReSTART!	Shelley Wong	
2022	Sabikui Bisco	Tirol Ōchagama	
2022	Miss Kuroitsu from the Monster Development Department	Melty	
2022	Shadowverse Flame	Tsubasa Takanashi	
2022	Skeleton Knight in Another World	Chiyome	
2022	In the Heart of Kunoichi Tsubaki	Tōwata	
2022	Kaguya-sama: Love Is War – Ultra Romantic	Miko Iino	
2022	Onipan!	Noriko Issun	
2022	The Rising of the Shield Hero 2	Kizuna Kazayama	
2022	Classroom of the Elite	Shiho Manabe	
2022	Made in Abyss: The Golden City of the Scorching Sun	Riko	
2022	My Stepmom's Daughter Is My Ex	Isana Higashira	
2022	Smile of the Arsnotoria the Animation	Little Alberta	
2022	Prima Doll	Gekka	
2022	Shine Post	Homare Torawatari	
2022	The Maid I Hired Recently Is Mysterious	Natsume Nakashima	
2022	Mobile Suit Gundam: The Witch from Mercury	Chuatury Panlunch	
2022	Shinobi no Ittoki	Satomi Tsubaki	
2022	Tabi Hani	Akari Yashima	
2023	Farming Life in Another World	Flora	
2023	Endo and Kobayashi Live! The Latest on Tsundere Villainess Lieselotte	Fiene	
2023	Ayakashi Triangle	Matsuri Kazamaki (female)	
2023	KamiKatsu	Beltran (female)	
2023	KonoSuba: An Explosion on This Wonderful World!	Funifura	
2023	Too Cute Crisis	Sasara Azuma	
2023	Reborn as a Vending Machine, I Now Wander the Dungeon	Shui	
2023	The 100 Girlfriends Who Really, Really, Really, Really, Really Love You	Karane Inda	
2023	Butareba: The Story of a Man Turned into a Pig	Ceres	
2024	Delicious in Dungeon	Mickbell	
2024	My Instant Death Ability Is So Overpowered	Tomochika Dannoura	
2024	Sasaki and Peeps	Elsa	
2024	'Tis Time for "Torture," Princess	Vanilla Peschutz	
2024	The Witch and the Beast	Helga Velvet	
2024	Jellyfish Can't Swim in the Night	Kiui Watase	
2024	Gods' Games We Play	Mysterious Beautiful Girl	
2024	Our Last Crusade or the Rise of a New World Season II	May	
2024	Code Geass: Rozé of the Recapture	Haruka Rutaka	
2025	The Daily Life of a Middle-Aged Online Shopper in Another World	Myarey	
2025	Please Put Them On, Takamine-san	Rurika Kurosaki	
2025	Kamitsubaki City Under Construction	Hastaa	
2025	Dusk Beyond the End of the World	Amoru	
2025	May I Ask for One Final Thing?	Nanaka	
2025	Touring After the Apocalypse	Airi	
2025	Umamusume: Cinderella Gray	Ellerslie Pride	
2026	Petals of Reincarnation	M. D'Armont	
2026	An Observation Log of My Fiancée Who Calls Herself a Villainess	Bertia	
2026	Pardon the Intrusion, I'm Home!	Shion Kogi	
2026	The Warrior Princess and the Barbaric King	Kimaki	
2026	Botan Kamiina Fully Blossoms When Drunk	Yaeka Kitamori	
2026	Full Clearing Another World Under a Goddess with Zero Believers	Fiona the Cat	
2026	Even the Student Council Has Its Holes!	Komaro Michinoku, female student	
2026	Uncle's Obsession with Cute Things	Pugtaro	
2026	The Cold Sato-san Is Only Sweet to Me	Rinka Sudō	
2026	Magical Girl Raising Project: Restart	Detec Bell	
2027	Gacha Girls Corps	Norl Fanya	
2027	Mercedes and the Waning Moon	Monica	
2027	My Sword Saint Master Is Too Cute to Live With!	Fiona Rosso	
2027	Mistress Kanan Is Devilishly Easy	Lily Kageno	
2027	Tune In to the Midnight Heart	Kana Himekawa	

=== Films ===
Year	Title	Role	Ref.
2016	Aikatsu Stars!	Yume Nijino	
2016	Garo: Divine Flame	Roberto Lewis	
2019	Made in Abyss: Journey's Dawn and Wandering Twilight	Riko	
2019	KonoSuba: God's Blessing on this Wonderful World! Legend of Crimson	Funifura	
2020	Made in Abyss: Dawn of the Deep Soul	Riko	
2020	High School Fleet: The Movie	Sachiho "Sunny" Chiba	
2022	Kaguya-sama: Love Is War – The First Kiss That Never Ends	Miko Iino	
2024	My Oni Girl	Tsumugi	
2026	Grotesqqque	Chiffon	
2026	Made in Abyss: Mezameru Shinpi	Riko	

=== Video games ===
Year	Title	Role	Ref.
2016	Granblue Fantasy	Chloe	
2016	Onsen Musume	Hinata Kinugawa	
2016	Shōjo Kageki Revue Starlight -Re LIVE-	Lalafin Nonomiya	
2016	Valkyrie Connect	Frigg	
2020	Idolmaster Cinderella Girls: Starlight Stage	Akira Sunazuka	
2020	Arknights	Kafka	
2021	Assault Lily Last Bullet	Himeka Sadamori	
2021	Blue Archive	Shimiko Endo	
2021	Smile of the Arsnotoria	Petit Albert	
2021	Azur Lane	USS New Jersey (BB-62)	
2021	Closers	Shizuku Hoshino (Eunha)	
2022	Fire Emblem Warriors: Three Hopes	Protagonist (Female) / Shez (Female)	
2022	Genshin Impact	Layla	
2022	Made in Abyss: Binary Star Falling into Darkness	Riko	
2022	Samurai Maiden	Komimi	
2023	Towa Tsugai	Hachidori	
2023	Fuga: Melodies of Steel 2	Socks Million	
2023	Echocalypse	Lumin	
2026	Dead or Alive Xtreme Venus Vacation	Meg	
2025	Majogami	Shiroha	
2026	Nekopara: Sekai Connect	Cookie	
2026	Persona 5: The Phantom X	Berry	
2027	Honkai: Nexus Anima	Juelle	
