= Shota Oni =

Japanese manga series

- First tankōbon volume cover, featuring Yū Shimizu (left) and Tsubaki Sawashiro (right)

ショタおに
- Genre: Boys' love
- Manga
- Written by: Miyuki Nakayama
- Published by: Square Enix
- Imprint: Gangan Comics BLiss
- Magazine: Gangan BLiss
- Original run: September 1, 2021 – present
- Volumes: 7
- Anime television series

Ore to Yu Nii!
- Directed by: Noriko Hashimoto
- Written by: Yuniko Ayana
- Music by: Yukari Hashimoto; Ruka Kawada
- Studio: Studio Hibari
- Original run: January 2027 – scheduled
- icon

Shota Oni (ショタおに) is a Japanese boys' love manga series written and illustrated by Miyuki Nakayama. It began serialization on NTT Solmare's Comic CMoa website under Square Enix's Gangan BLiss boy's love manga brand in September 2021. The story follows Tsubaki, a boy in elementary school who loves his teenage friend Yū. An anime television series adaptation produced by Studio Hibari, titled Ore to Yu Nii!, is set to premiere in January 2027.

== Plot ==
Tsubaki, a 10-year-old fifth-grade student, is in love with his childhood friend and neighbor, Yu, who is seven years older than him. The manga follows Tsubaki, who aims to be big and cool, and Yu, who seems to be at the mercy of Tsubaki because of his love for him.

== Characters ==
Tsubaki Sawashiro (沢城椿, Sawashiro Tsubaki)
Voiced by: Shinnosuke Tokudome
Yū Shimizu (清水悠, Shimizu Yū)
Voiced by: Shūichirō Umeda

== Media ==
=== Manga ===
Written and illustrated by Miyuki Nakayama, Shota Oni began serialization on NTT Solmare's Comic CMoa website under Square Enix's Gangan BLiss boy's love manga brand on September 1, 2021. Its chapters have been collected into seven tankōbon volumes as of March 2026.

No.	Release date	ISBN
1	November 21, 2021	978-4-7575-7584-4
2	June 22, 2022	978-4-7575-7980-4
3	February 21, 2023	978-4-7575-8371-9; 978-4-7575-8372-6 (SE)
4	September 21, 2023	978-4-7575-8745-8; 978-4-7575-8746-5 (SE)
5	June 20, 2024	978-4-7575-9259-9
6	March 22, 2025	978-4-7575-9756-3; 978-4-7575-9757-0 (SE)
7	March 21, 2026	978-4-301-00409-7

=== Anime ===
An anime adaptation was announced in the sixth volume of the manga released on March 22, 2025. The adaptation was later confirmed to be a television series and was renamed Ore to Yu Nii! (俺と悠兄！; lit. 'Me and Older Brother Yu'). The series will be produced by Studio Hibari and directed by Noriko Hashimoto, with Yuniko Ayana handling series composition, Yumi Kuroiwa designing the characters, and Yukari Hashimoto and Ruka Kawada composing the music. It is set to premiere in January 2027. The ending theme song is "Pure Heart Beat" (ぴゅあ Heart Beat), performed by Shinnosuke Tokudome and Shūichirō Umeda as their respective characters.

== Reception ==
The series won the award in the Best Next Generation (Newcomer) category in boy's love website Chil-Chil's BL Awards in 2022.

== See also ==
- Blend S, another manga series by the same author
- Spirits & Cat Ears, another manga series by the same author
