= Breasts Are My Favorite Things in the World! =

Japanese manga series

- First tankōbon volume cover

世界で一番おっぱいが好き！ (Sekai de Ichiban Oppai ga Suki!)
- Genre: Comedy, yuri
- Manga
- Written by: Wakame Konbu
- Published by: Media Factory
- English publisher: NA: Yen Press
- Imprint: MFC Cune Series
- Magazine: Comic Cune
- Original run: July 27, 2017 – August 25, 2023
- Volumes: 8
- icon

Breasts Are My Favorite Things in the World! (世界で一番おっぱいが好き！, Sekai de Ichiban Oppai ga Suki!) is a Japanese manga series written and illustrated by Wakame Konbu. It was serialized in Media Factory's Comic Cune magazine from July 2017 to August 2023.

== Plot ==
Chiaki Ichihara, a popular high school girl, secretly finds the act of touching another girl's breasts relaxing. She has established a platonic relationship with another girl, Hana Harumi, who allows Chiaki to feel her breasts. However, Hana is beginning to develop romantic feelings for Chiaki.

== Characters ==
Chiaki Ichihara (市原千秋, Ichihara Chiaki)
Voiced by: Mikako Komatsu (drama CD)
Hana Harumi (春見はな, Harumi Hana)
Voiced by: Risa Taneda (drama CD)
Tōka Momose (桃瀬とうか, Momose Tōka)
Voiced by: Ai Kayano (drama CD)
Kana Kashiwagi (柏木かな, Kashiwagi Kana)
Voiced by: Rina Hidaka (drama CD)
Subaru Sasazuka (笹塚すばる, Sasazuka Subaru)
Voiced by: Sora Tokui (drama CD)

== Publication ==
Written and illustrated by Wakame Konbu, Breasts Are My Favorite Things in the World! was serialized in Media Factory's Comic Cune magazine from July 27, 2017, to August 25, 2023. The series' chapters were collected in eight tankōbon volumes from February 2018 to September 2023. Two drama CDs were included in the releases of volumes 3 and 4.

The manga is licensed in English by Yen Press.

No.	Original release date	Original ISBN	English release date	English ISBN
1	February 26, 2018	978-4-04-069700-0	June 23, 2020	978-1-9753-1003-5
Chapters 0–9; Bonus
2	October 26, 2018	978-4-04-065036-4	November 24, 2020	978-1-9753-1024-0
Chapters 10–17; Side story; Bonus
3	March 27, 2019	978-4-04-065433-1	January 5, 2021	978-1-9753-1028-8
Chapters 18–25; Side story; Bonus
4	December 27, 2019	978-4-04-064156-0	January 25, 2022	978-1-9753-3387-4
Chapters 26–33; Side story; Bonus
5	October 26, 2020	978-4-04-064913-9	March 22, 2022	978-1-9753-3625-7
Chapters 34–42; Side stories 1–2; Recording report
6	November 27, 2021	978-4-04-680800-4	November 22, 2022	978-1-9753-5180-9
Chapters 43–52; Side story
7	November 26, 2022	978-4-04-681972-7	October 17, 2023	978-1-9753-7468-6
Chapters 53–62; Side story
8	September 27, 2023	978-4-04-682805-7	August 20, 2024	979-8-8554-0182-0
Chapters 63–71; Side story

== See also ==
- The Great Jahy Will Not Be Defeated!, another manga series by the same author
- The Maid I Hired Recently Is Mysterious, another manga series by the same author
- So You Weren't Into Me?!, another manga series by the same author
