= The Great Jahy Will Not Be Defeated! =

Japanese manga series

- First tankōbon volume cover, featuring Jahy in her small form

ジャヒー様はくじけない！ (Jahī-sama wa Kujikenai!)
- Genre: Comedy; Slice of life; Supernatural
- Manga
- Written by: Wakame Konbu
- Published by: Square Enix
- English publisher: NA: Square Enix
- Magazine: Monthly Gangan Joker
- Original run: August 22, 2017 – present
- Volumes: 12
- Anime television series
- Directed by: Mirai Minato
- Produced by: Yoshito Hayano; Takumi Itou; Shouta Komatsu; Takuya Matsumoto; Yutaka Suwa
- Written by: Michiko Yokote
- Music by: Kōji Fujimoto; Osamu Sasaki
- Studio: Silver Link
- Licensed by: Crunchyroll (streaming); SEA: Plus Media Networks Asia
- Original network: ANN (ABC TV, TV Asahi)
- English network: SEA: Aniplus Asia
- Original run: August 1, 2021 – December 19, 2021
- Episodes: 20

The Great Jahy Will Not Be Defeated! (Japanese: ジャヒー様はくじけない！, Hepburn: Jahī-sama wa Kujikenai!; lit. "Jahy-sama Won't Be Discouraged!") is a Japanese comedy manga series written and illustrated by Wakame Konbu. It has been serialized in Square Enix's shōnen manga magazine Monthly Gangan Joker since August 2017, and its chapters have been collected into twelve tankōbon volumes as of November 2025. In North America, the manga is licensed by Square Enix.

An anime television series adaptation by Silver Link aired from August to December 2021 on ABC and TV Asahi's Animazing!!! programming block.

== Plot ==
Jahy, the feared and respected second-in-command of the Dark Realm, suddenly finds herself powerless and shrunken in the human world after a magical girl destroys a powerful mana crystal. This action also destroys Jahy's home realm. The manga follows Jahy and her daily life as she learns to live in her new surroundings and to make friends. Meanwhile, she works to restore her original form, the mana crystal, and the Dark Realm.

== Characters ==
Jahy (ジャヒー, Jahī)
Voiced by: Naomi Ōzora (Japanese); Lisette Monique Diaz (English)
Jahy is the former aide to the Dark Lord and second-in-command of the Dark Realm, who is now living in the human world after the Dark Realm perished. She aims to find parts of the mana crystal and restore her home world and her original body, which is in a child-like state after the crystal was destroyed by a magical girl, leaving her powerless. Though she struggles to adapt to her new surroundings and her current state, she remains confident, vigorous, and ambitious. Later on in the series, she establishes her own restaurant, but leaves Druj to run it.
Druj (ドゥルジ, Duruji)
Voiced by: Kana Hanazawa (Japanese); Monét Lerner (English)
A former subordinate of Jahy's who goes by the name Nana Dojima (堂島 ナナ, Dōjima Nana) in the human world. She is the president of a consulting company. Even though she lives elegantly in a high-rise condominium while Jahy lives in squalor in a decaying apartment building, she nonetheless remains friendly with Jahy and regularly hangs out with her. She enjoys being berated and treated as a subhuman by Jahy.
Boss (店長, Tenchō) / Chisa (ちさ, Chisa)
Voiced by: Ai Kayano (Japanese); Natalie Rose (English)
The manager of the pub Sōsaku Izakaya Maō. (創作居酒屋まおう。; transl. "Craft Pub Maou."), where Jahy works. Often displaying a sort of motherly tenderness, she is very friendly with Jahy and gives her the nickname "Hy-chan" (ひーちゃん, Hī-chan).
Landlord (大家, Ōya) / Ryou (涼, Ryō)
Voiced by: Yoko Hikasa (Japanese); Suzanne DeCarma (English)
The landlady of the apartment where Jahy lives, and the sister of the pub manager. She constantly pesters Jahy about her rent, though she also cares about her tenant (albeit with a very tsundere attitude). Similarly to her sister, she nicknames Jahy "Jako" (ジャー子, Jā-ko).
Kokoro Sasaki (佐崎 こころ, Sasaki Kokoro)
Voiced by: Yui Ogura (Japanese); Brooklyn Wade (English)
An elementary school student who helps Jahy on her quest to find mana crystal shards. She exudes an extreme amount of kindness and praise for Jahy, which compels Jahy to befriend her.
Kyouko Jingu (神宮 きょうこ, Jingū Kyōko) / Magical Girl (魔法少女, Mahō Shōjo)
Voiced by: Sumire Uesaka (Japanese); Brittney Karbowski (English)
The magical girl that destroyed Jahy's home world, who later works at the same pub as her. She was originally an ordinary high school girl, but set out as a magical girl to save others from their misfortunes after a mysterious light bestowed a mission to her as she nearly drowned to death. As a result of collecting the same mana crystals as Jahy, she experiences regular bouts of incredibly bad luck. She eventually becomes friendly with Jahy and does not get along with Druj because of this.
Saurva (サルワ, Saruwa)
Voiced by: Mikako Komatsu (Japanese); Brittany Lauda (English)
An elaborately-dressed girl who aims to take Jahy's spot as the number-two ruler of the Dark Realm. Although she is talented and thorough with inventing and planning strategies, she is careless and her efforts prove fruitless.
Demon Lord (魔王, Maō)
Voiced by: Miho Okasaki (Japanese); Krystal LaPorte (English)
The Demon Lord of the Dark Realm who revived in a smaller form in Kyouko's house due to the mana crystals she had amassed. A non-talkative demon who has a blank expression on her face at most times, she is an incredible glutton, often eating large amounts of food.
Su (スー, Sū)
Voiced by: Akari Kitō (Japanese); Celeste Perez (English)
The Demon Lord's younger sister, whose attempt to reconcile with her sister by turning Kyouko into a powerful magical girl accidentally resulted in destroying her and the Dark Realm. Thus, she went around as a mysterious light and began using magical girls to try and gather the mana crystals for her.

== Media ==
=== Manga ===
Originally starting as a one-shot in March 2017, Square Enix has serialized The Great Jahy Will Not Be Defeated! in its monthly shōnen manga magazine, Gangan Joker, since August 22 of the same year. As of November 20, 2025, twelve tankōbon volumes have been published, starting with the first volume released on February 22, 2018. The series is set to end with the release of its thirteenth volume in Q4 2026.

In North America, the manga is published by the Manga & Books division of Square Enix. The first volume was originally scheduled to release in September 2020, but had to be delayed due to the COVID-19 pandemic. The release date was changed to July 27, 2021.

==== Volumes ====
No.	Original release date	Original ISBN	English release date	English ISBN
1	February 22, 2018	978-4-7575-5634-8	July 27, 2021	978-1-64609-076-1
2	April 21, 2018	978-4-7575-5697-3	April 12, 2022	978-1-64609-077-8
3	October 22, 2018	978-4-7575-5885-4	July 12, 2022	978-1-64609-078-5
4	April 22, 2019	978-4-7575-6023-9	November 15, 2022	978-1-64609-079-2
5	September 21, 2019	978-4-7575-6209-7	May 9, 2023	978-1-64609-085-3
6	April 22, 2020	978-4-7575-6617-0	August 15, 2023	978-1-64609-111-9
7	July 20, 2021	978-4-7575-7104-4; 978-4-7575-7281-2 (SE)	October 17, 2023	978-1-64609-161-4
8	December 22, 2021	978-4-7575-7637-7	May 7, 2024	978-1-64609-194-2
9	October 21, 2022	978-4-7575-8212-5	July 16, 2024	978-1-64609-245-1
10	September 21, 2023	978-4-7575-8804-2	October 1, 2024	978-1-64609-302-1
11	March 22, 2025	978-4-7575-9761-7	May 12, 2026	978-1-64609-459-2
12	November 20, 2025	978-4-301-00175-1	March 2, 2027	979-8-899-10032-1

=== Anime ===
An anime television series adaptation was announced on April 16, 2021. The two-cour series was animated by Silver Link and directed by Mirai Minato, with Michiko Yokote overseeing series scripts, Saori Nakashiki designing characters and serving as chief animation director, and Kōji Fujimoto and Osamu Sasaki composing the music. It aired from August 1 to December 19, 2021, on ABC and TV Asahi's Animazing!!! programming block.

The first opening theme is "Fightin★Pose", performed by Yui Ogura, while the ending theme is "Tsumari wa Itsumo Kujikenai!" (つまりはいつもくじけない！; "In Other Words, I'm Always Undefeated!"), performed by NEGI☆U, a unit formed of Hololive Production-affiliated VTubers Minato Aqua, Oozora Subaru, and Momosuzu Nene. The second opening theme is "Seikatsu Konkyū Dame Dinero" (生活こんきゅーダメディネロ; "Life in Poverty, Give Me Money"), performed by Sumire Uesaka, while the ending theme is "Petals" (ペタルズ, Petaruzu), performed by Miho Okasaki.

Crunchyroll streamed the series outside of Asia. Plus Media Networks Asia licensed the series in Southeast Asia and released it on Aniplus Asia. On July 19, 2022, Crunchyroll announced that the series would receive an English dub, which premiered the following day.

==== Episodes ====
Restoration Plan No.	Title	Directed by	Written by	Storyboarded by	Original release date
1	"The Great Jahy Can't Go Back!"; Transliteration: "Jahī-sama wa Modorenai!" (Japanese: ジャヒー様はもどれない!)	Mirai Minato	Michiko Yokote	Mirai Minato	August 1, 2021 (Note: This episode aired at 2:05 a.m. JST, 5 minutes after the original air time on ABC Television.)
Jahy is the second-in-command of the Dark Realm until a magical girl appears and shatters a giant mana crystal, destroying the Dark Realm and causing Jahy to lose almost all of her magical powers, leaving her in a small form. Determined to find the shattered parts of the crystal so she can regain her power and restore the Dark Realm, Jahy is forced to live in a run-down apartment while using her remaining magic to temporarily regain her adult form and work part-time at a craft pub. When her magic runs out and she is discovered in her smaller form by the store manager, Jahy attempts to take over the store only to be comforted by the manager instead. Later, the manager's sister Ryou, the landlord of Jahy's apartment building, struggles to get Jahy to pay her rent. When Jahy discovers her mana crystal necklace is missing, she finds that the manager had been holding onto it for her.
2	"Druj Asks No Questions!"; Transliteration: "Duruji-jō wa Utagawanai!" (Japanese: ドゥルジ嬢は疑わない!)	Hideaki Uehara	Michiko Yokote	Kōji Sawai	August 8, 2021 (Note: This episode aired at 2:15 am. JST, 15 minutes after the original air time on ABC Television.)
Jahy stumbles across her loyal servant from the Dark Realm, Druj, who has since become a successful businesswoman, forcing Jahy to try and hide her shabby lifestyle from her to maintain her dignity. The next day, Jahy finds herself at Druj's high-rise apartment, where she discovers Druj has already assembled several mana crystals for herself. While searching the forest for more crystals, Jahy gets lost, loses her crystal to a crow, gets caught in the rain, and sprains her ankle. Discovering a chick that had fallen from its nest, Jahy risks herself to return it, finding both her crystal and another larger one before she is found by Ryou.
3	"The Great Jahy Can't Brag..."; Transliteration: "Jahī-sama wa Jiman Dekinai..." (Japanese: ジャヒー様は自慢できない…)	Hidehiko Kadota	Michiko Yokote	Hiromitsu Kanazawa	August 15, 2021 (Note: This episode aired at 2:30 am. JST, 30 minutes after the original air time on ABC Television.)
Jahy's joy over obtaining a larger mana crystal quickly dwindles as she ends up using up all of its power doing menial tasks for the manager. The next day, Jahy attempts to brag about the crystal she found to Druj, only to find that she has been having far more success with finding crystals. Later, Druj comes across the pub, forcing Jahy to pretend she owns the place to keep Druj from finding out that she works below someone.
4	"Saurva Never Slips Up?"; Transliteration: "Saruwa-san wa Nukarinai?" (Japanese: サルワさんはぬかりない?)	Kōichirō Kuroda	Misaki Morie	Shin'ichi Watanabe	August 29, 2021 (Note: This episode aired at 2:35 am. JST, 35 minutes after the original air time on ABC Television.)
Saurva, a resident of the Dark Realm who has long sought to usurp the role of second-in-command from Jahy, looks for a chance to defeat her with a magic intensifying potion, only to accidentally feed it to a dog instead. The next day, Saurva uses a magic pill to take Jahy's form in an attempt to ruin her reputation at work, only to wind up inadvertently improving it instead. Finding herself low on money and food, Jahy goes to the shopping district to find a way to make some easy money, only to end up spending all of her remaining money instead.
5	"The Great Jahy Isn't Suspicious?!"; Transliteration: "Jahī-sama wa Ayashikunai!?" (Japanese: ジャヒー様は怪しくない!?)	Yūshi Ibe	Touko Machida	Mirai Minato, Shin'ichi Watanabe	September 5, 2021
While being detained by a policeman over her attire, Jahy hears of a magical girl sighting and goes to investigate, only to find it to be someone completely different to the one who destroyed the Dark Realm. Jahy ends up catching a cold from Ryou, prompting the Manager to come over and look after her. The next day, the true magical girl shows up to try and take Jahy's mana crystal but is stopped by Ryou, who calls the police on her.
6	"The Great Jahy Doesn't Seem to Stand a Chance..."; Transliteration: "Jahī-sama wa Katesō mo nai..." (Japanese: ジャヒー様は勝てそうもない…)	Chihiro Kumano	Touko Machida	Shin'ichi Watanabe	September 12, 2021
Jahy encounters the magical girl in her civilian form, discovering that she experiences extreme misfortune as a result of gathering mana crystals. Losing her mana crystal to the magical girl after letting her guard down, Jahy spends the evening getting drunk with Ryou, a decision they both regret come the morning.
7	"The Great Jahy Doesn't Play!"; Transliteration: "Jahī-sama wa Asobanai!" (Japanese: ジャヒー様は遊ばない！)	Mirai Minato	Michiko Yokote	Hiromitsu Kanazawa	September 19, 2021
Jahy joins the Manager in her exercise routine, finding herself getting into it until the Manager quits after achieving her diet goal. Jahy becomes frustrated with her next-door neighbor playing loud music in the middle of the night, soon finding herself caught up in a jam session. While searching for mana crystals, Jahy is helped out by a grade schooler named Kokoro Sasaki, who finds her a four-leaved clover.
8	"The Great Jahy Can't Bathe!"; Transliteration: "Jahī-sama wa Ofuro ni Hairenai!" (Japanese: ジャヒー様はお風呂に入れない！)	Misuzu Hoshino	Aya Matsui	Tetsuro Amino	September 26, 2021
Druj invites Jahy to her company, Dojima Corporation, to speak before her employees, only for Druj to end up doing most of the speaking. Jahy then goes to a public bath with Ryou and the Manager, before Druj holds her a party to remind her of the Dark Realm.
9	"Saurva Can't Catch a Break..."; Transliteration: "Saruwa-san wa Iyasarenai..." (Japanese: サルワさんは癒されない…)	Mirai Minato	Misaki Morie	Miyana Okita	October 3, 2021
Saurva goes to the bathhouse in the hopes of relaxing, only to coincide with Jahy's first trip there with Ryou and the Manager. Jahy goes to a home store to find a weapon to use against the magical girl, only to end up wasting all of her pay on a bunch of useless products. Later, Jahy sets up traps for the magical girl all around her apartment, trapping herself inside in the process. On another day, Saurva mistakes Jahy in her child form for someone else, coming to admire her for her strength.
10	"The Magical Girl Will Not Lose!"; Transliteration: "Mahō Shōjo wa Makerarenai!" (Japanese: 魔法少女は負けられない！)	Rin Teraoka, Mirai Minato	Touko Machida	Hideaki Uehara, Mirai Minato	October 10, 2021
After Kokoro is saved from an oncoming truck by the magical girl, Jahy tries to prove to her that she is much better than the magical girl. As Jahy worries that she is becoming too accustomed to human life, the Manager attempts to comfort her. Wanting to get her mana crystal back from the magical girl, Kyouko Jingu, Jahy follows her to her school, learning of her determination to gather the mana crystals and eventually destroy them to save others from misfortune.
11	"The Landlord Can't Come Home..."; Transliteration: "Ōya wa Kaerenai..." (Japanese: 大家は帰れない…)	Yūsuke Onoda	Aya Matsui	Shin'ichi Watanabe	October 17, 2021
Jahy tries growing a cherry tomato plant at home to save on her grocery bill, putting a lot of effort and money into raising it, only to discover she's been growing habanero peppers instead. Ryou moves into Jahy's place after getting into a fight with the Manager, while Jahy meets up with Druj to report on her progress, leading her to claim that the magical girl is her underling. When Ryou refuses to make up with the Manager, Jahy reminds her to value the home that she has and convince her to make up with her sister.
12	"Kokoro-chan Will Not Betray?"; Transliteration: "Kokoro-chan wa Uragiranai?" (Japanese: こころちゃんは裏切らない？)	Hidehiko Kadota, Mirai Minato	Misaki Morie	Hiromitsu Kanazawa, Mirai Minato	October 24, 2021
Jahy discovers a mana crystal in the middle of the street, feeling paranoid over falling into a trap until the Manager tries to pick it up for herself. While at the park with Kokoro the next day, Jahy becomes conflicted between her objective of finding mana crystals and her desire to make Kokoro happy by playing with her, ultimate choosing to help her when they are approached by policemen. Meanwhile, Saurva accidentally turns herself into a dog, finding herself unable to resist her new canine urges. Later, Jahy tries to win some snacks for her and Kokoro in a crane game.
13	"Druj Is Not Happy!"; Transliteration: "Duruji Jō wa Yorokobanai!" (Japanese: ドゥルジ嬢は悦ばない！)	Yūshi Ibe	Michiko Yokote	Tetsuro Amino	October 31, 2021
Jahy is brought along to help out Manager and Ryou with their uncle's beach shack, which is struggling with business due to an influx of jellyfish in the sea. Believing a large mana crystal to be the cause, Jahy tries to search for it, rescuing several people in the process and finally stumbling upon a large pile of crystal shards. Later, Jahy invites Druj to relax with her in the park, only to find that she prefers being treated like a slave. With her new collection of mana crystals, Jahy sets off to face Kyouko.
14	"The Magical Girl Will Not Fight!"; Transliteration: "Mahō Shōjo wa Tatakawanai!" (Japanese: 魔法少女は戦わない！)	Mirai Minato	Touko Machida	Kubo Shiba	November 7, 2021
Armed with her assortment of mana crystal shards, Jahy fights against Kyouko, who ultimately offers to relinquish all her mana crystals on the condition that Jahy be her friend. Kyouko invites Jahy over to her calamity-ridden house, where Jahy discovers that the Demon Lord has manifested in a child-like physical form due to the number of mana crystals Kyouko has collected. After Jahy witnesses first-hand how much of a glutton the Demon Lord is, Kyouko tells her about the mysterious voice who made her a magical girl and ordered her to destroy the Dark Realm.
15	"The Boss Cannot Decide!"; Transliteration: "Tenchō wa Kimerarenai!" (Japanese: 店長は決められない！)	Yūshi Ibe, Misaki Nishimoto	Aya Matsui	Miyana Okita	November 14, 2021
Jahy becomes annoyed when Kyouko joins in her playtime with Kokoro, who is more than happy to be friends with her. Kyouko then begins working at the pub, which initially makes Jahy's work harder until she gives her some training. Later, Jahy takes advantage of the Manager asking her and Kyouko to sample potential new menu items to get her to cook some quality steak.
16	"The Demon Lord Doesn't Hold Back!"; Transliteration: "Maō-sama wa Enryo Shinai!" (Japanese: 魔王様は遠慮しない！)	Yoshifumi Sueda	Misaki Morie	Shin'ichi Watanabe	November 21, 2021
Druj and Kyouko argue with each other over who is most suited to be by Jahy's side and challenge each other to collect the most mana crystals. Later, Saurva becomes annoyed when Kyouko keeps setting off the traps that she had set for Jahy and coming out unscathed. When Kyouko leaves her lunch box at home, the Dark Lord sneaks into her school to bring it to her. As Kyouko questions Jahy about why she worships the Demon Lord so much, the Demon Lord herself disposes of a mysterious shimmer of light following after them.
17	"The Great Jahy Can't Sleep..."; Transliteration: "Jahī-sama wa Nemurenai..." (Japanese: ジャヒー様は眠れない…)	Chihiro Kumano	Michiko Yokote	Tetsuro Amino	November 28, 2021
Druj is less than pleased to see Kyouko working at the pub, becoming jealous of the treatment she gets from Jahy. After buying herself a luxury futon, Jahy ends up having to stay with Ryou and the Manager while the water is shut off in her apartment. Meanwhile, as Saurva unwittingly helps out around the neighborhood, a mysterious being of light appears and grants her power for her good deeds, urging her to destroy the mana crystals.
18	"Saurva Will Not Lose!"; Transliteration: "Saruwa-san wa Yaburenai!" (Japanese: サルワさんは敗れない！)	Yūshi Ibe	Michiko Yokote	Shin'ichi Watanabe	December 5, 2021
Granted with the power of light, Saurva confronts Jahy in battle, only to find that her attacks do absolutely nothing. Jahy becomes worried when Kokoro appears to be avoiding her, later discovering it was just because Kokoro had a toothache and couldn't talk to her. After hearing rumors of a ghost, Jahy is approached by the creature of light, who attempts to steal her mana crystal before Druj intervenes.
19	"The Demon Lord Is Relentless?!"; Transliteration: "Maō-sama wa Yōshanai!?" (Japanese: 魔王様は容赦ない！？)	Misuzu Hoshino	Michiko Yokote	Miyana Okita	December 12, 2021
Druj spends so much time reminiscing about how Jahy saved her in the Dark Realm that the being of light ends up having escaped. After being given the idea of opening her own restaurant, Jahy becomes eager to get started right away, though hesitates when she considers all the time she's spent with the Manager. The next day, the being of light once again appears and turns the Manager into a magical girl, only to find that she refuses to hand over Jahy's mana crystals. As the being reveals her true form to be similar to the Demon Lord's, the Demon Lord herself fights against her, with the two of them turning into giants. Angered by the pub getting damaged in their wake, Jahy charges in to stop the two, getting caught between their attacks and knocked unconscious. The being of light, revealing herself to be the Demon Lord's younger sister Su, explains that the destruction of the Demon Realm brought about by turning Kyouko into a magical girl was simply because she wanted her sister's attention, the stupidity of which brings Jahy back to her senses.
20	"The Great Jahy Will Not Be Defeated!"; Transliteration: "Jahī-sama wa Kujikenai!" (Japanese: ジャヒー様はくじけない！)	Mirai Minato, Yamato Ōuchi	Michiko Yokote	Mirai Minato, Hiromitsu Kanazawa, Hiroshi Yoneda, Shin'ichi Watanabe	December 19, 2021
After the Demon Lord and Su repair the pub, everyone holds a farewell party for Jahy to celebrate her new shop. Upon finding how much a new restaurant would cost her, however, Jahy puts Druj in charge of it instead and decides to stay working at the pub. Later, as the shopping district holds a festival, Jahy takes part in a shrine-carrying contest alongside Kokoro, managing to win the top prize. Meanwhile, Saurva is recruited by the Manager to take part in the festival too, later joining Ryou as a backup drummer and being caught up in the festivities all the while. Later that night, everyone gathers around Jahy as they watch the fireworks together.

== See also ==
- Breasts Are My Favorite Things in the World!, another manga series by the same author
- The Maid I Hired Recently Is Mysterious, another manga series by the same author
- So You Weren't Into Me?!, another manga series by the same author
