= Yoshimasa Hiraike =

Japanese anime director

- Occupations: Storyboard artist, screenwriter, director

Yoshimasa Hiraike (平池芳正, Hiraike Yoshimasa) is a Japanese storyboard artist, screenwriter, and director. He has collaborated with famed director Junichi Sato in series such as Aria, Kaleido Star, and Prétear.

== Anime involved in ==
- Excel Saga: Episode Director (7, 12, 17, 22, 25)
- Vandread: Episode Director (5)
- Prétear: Episode Director (4, 8)
- Vandread: The Second Stage: Storyboard (ep 6), Episode Director (1, 6, 8, 11), Assistant Director
- Saikano: Storyboard (ep 7), Episode Director (2, 7)
- Kaleido Star: Director (Season 2), Assistant Director
- SoltyRei: Director, Storyboard (ep 1)
- Aria The Natural: Storyboard (ep 15, 22), Episode Director (15, 22)
- Sketchbook ~full color'S~: Director, Storyboard (ep 1, 6), Episode Director (13)
- Working!!: Director, Series Composition, Storyboard (ep 1, 2)
- Amagami SS: Director, Series Composition, Storyboard (1, 13), Episode Director (26)
- AKB0048: Director, Storyboard (ep 1, 2, 5, 9)
- AKB0048 next stage: Director, Storyboard (ep 4, 12)
- Tokyo Ravens: Storyboard (ep 6)
- Gugure! Kokkuri-san: Director, Script, Storyboard (ep 1)
- Momokuri: Director, Series Composition
- Nyanko Days: Director, Series Composition
- Wotakoi: Love Is Hard for Otaku: Director, Series Composition
- Black Summoner: Director, Series Composition
