= Spirits & Cat Ears =

Japanese manga series

- The cover of the first volume of Spirits & Cat Ears

くだみみの猫 (Kudamimi no Neko)
- Genre: Comedy, Drama, Romance, Slice of Life, Supernatural
- Manga
- Written by: Miyuki Nakayama
- Published by: Media Factory
- English publisher: NA: Yen Press
- Magazine: Monthly Comic Alive (2014–2017); Comic Cune (2017 – present)
- Original run: 23 June 2014 – present
- Volumes: 11

Spirits & Cat Ears (くだみみの猫, Kudamimi no Neko) is a Japanese manga series written and illustrated by Miyuki Nakayama. Media Factory has published eleven volumes since 23 June 2014. Yen Press has licensed the series in North America on 7 July 2016. The first volume was released in English to North America on 21 February 2017.

== Plot ==
The story follows Neneko Izuna, a rookie but experienced miko, and her faithful shikigami Sagami Shichikage. Neneko and Shichikage moved to Waka Clinic to take a job of exorcising evil spirits. Neneko and Shichikage meet fellow miko and shikigami who are also Waka clinic residents. The story follows their ordinary lives and defeating evil spirits as well the love story between miko and shikigami.

== Characters ==
Neneko Izuna
A shy, small-sized miko who lived most of her life as a shut-in due to her insecurities on being possessed by the "Kuda-Fox", a familiar used by miko to possess spirits and said to bring sickness and disease, leading to Neneko to grow two cat-like ears. Her wishes to live a normal life by exorcising "Kuda-Fox" prompted her to take up a job exorcising evil spirits at Waka Clinic. Neneko often annoyed Shichikage antics for cosplaying the costumes he made. Despite this, she is truly grateful to him since she has many pretty clothes made by him. Neneko later realized that she fell in love with Shichikage.
Sagami Shichikage
Neneko's shikigami whom she summoned one day when she was bored in her room. He is relatively obedient but sometimes restrains his mistress with a collar and chain, in addition to carrying her around due to her small stature. His specialty is restraining things with chains, which he was able trap his enemies so easily. He has a hobby of sewing and dressing Neneko up in cosplay costumes. Much to her annoyance. Despite his weird fetish, Shichikage very loyal to her and willing anything to protect her. Shichikage become Neneko shikigami when he was 14 years old while Neneko still 9 years old.
Miya Sōnoichi
A miko who summoned Shingetsu. She appears cold and distant at first glance due to her extreme fear of strangers brought about by her parents, who arranged everything for her every time. She becomes Neneko's first friend. She is very surprised by Shichikage chaining Neneko which is hinted she wanted to but always afraid. Miya seems has romantic feeling toward Shingetsu but often denying this.
Shingetsu Saigami
Miya's shikigami. He is released on the command "Dance!". Shingetsu very loyal to Miya but very oblivious her romantic feeling to him.
Meme Tamayori
A kind-hearted ten-year-old miko with an ability to set up barriers. Despite her youth, she is very powerful. She helps Neneko hide her ears under a temporary barrier when she goes to school. Meme seeing Neneko as her older sister. Meme and Enishi have father-daughter relationship although Meme always hitting Enishi when he pervert toward Neneko.
Enishi Mogami
Meme's shikigami who commands protection using black sheets. He is said to be rather perverted. Which Meme always hitting to him all time. Despite this, Enishi treated Meme like his daughter.
Yurika Waka
The director of Waka Clinic and a miko. She has lovers few years ago but died from unknown illness. She and her lovers has dreaming having a family together. Despite her lover's death, Yurika dreams later come true since she had several both miko and shikigami as her family.
Mirai Omogami
Yurika's shikigami with the power to manipulate gravity. He typically wears an eyepatch.
Chiya
A wicked miko who multiplies evil spirits. She goes to the same school as Izuna and Miya.

== Release ==
Spirits & Cat Ears was first serialized in the monthly seinen magazine Monthly Comic Alive in 2014. Three years later, the series was moved to another manga magazine called Comic Cune which started with a special chapter in the January 2018 issue. The manga resumed regular serialization with the February issue, which along with the previous month were released towards the end of 2017. Eleven bound volumes have been released in Japan which have been published by Media Factory (Kadokawa). Two drama CDs have also been released with the series, the second of which was bundled with the sixth volume. Mikako Komatsu plays the lead role of Neneko Izuna, while Takahiro Sakurai does the role of her shikigami Sagami Shichikage. Komatsu commented in an interview that she was excited to play the part, and that the character pairings of different gods added spice to the story.

On 7 July 2016, it was announced that American publisher Yen Press had licensed the series for release in North America. The release date was set for February in the following year, and the first manga volume came out on the 21st. Yen Press has released ten of the eleven manga volumes that have so far been released in Japan. The tenth volume of the series was released on 22 February 2022.

== Reception ==
The English-language adaptation of Spirits & Cat Ears has received average reviews which mostly were done on the first volume. Rebecca Silverman of Anime News Network gave the first volume an overall rating of a C+ citing the theme of bondage as a possible issue for readers. Silverman points out that there are many similar themes to the manga series Inu x Boku SS, while also calling it a "sister" series or extension. While she praises the good interaction between the characters and the cute artwork, Silverman states that nothing sets the story apart from "the standard". Brandon Varnell from "The Fandom Post" also reviewed the first volume, and concurred with Silverman on the story not being very original. Varnell went on to say that he can already tell how the story will end, but has been surprised "on occasion". He gave the overall content, packaging, and translation a "B" grade and gave an "A" for the artwork. Varnell later did a review on the fifth volume calling the series overall "the funnest, underrated series of our time". Although Varnell highly praised the character development up to this point, his overall grading remained about the same. Sean Gaffney from Manga Bookshelf also pointed out the similarity to "Inu x Boku SS" saying that he can get the same good things in Spirits & Cat Ears from other better series. Gaffney didn't call the series "completely terrible", but recommends it for people who like nekomimis and/or a "teasing sort-of boyfriend" that is into dressing his girlfriend in "sexy" outfits.

== See also ==
- Blend S – Another manga by the same author
- Shota Oni – Another manga by the same author
