= Ms. Vampire Who Lives in My Neighborhood =

Japanese manga series

- The cover of the first manga volume

となりの吸血鬼さん (Tonari no Kyūketsuki-san)
- Genre: Comedy
- Manga
- Written by: Amatou
- Published by: Media Factory
- Magazine: Monthly Comic Alive; Comic Cune (currently)
- Original run: August 2014 – December 2021
- Volumes: 8
- Anime television series
- Directed by: Noriyaki Akitaya
- Written by: Tatsuya Takahashi
- Music by: Yoshiaki Fujisawa
- Studio: Studio Gokumi; AXsiZ
- Licensed by: Crunchyroll (streaming; expired): NA: Discotek Media (home video)
- Original network: AT-X, Tokyo MX, SUN, BS11, TVA
- Original run: October 5, 2018 – December 21, 2018
- Episodes: 12

Ms. Vampire Who Lives in My Neighborhood (Note: Its English title had been Ms. Vampire Who Lives Next to the House, before the second volume was published in Japan.) (となりの吸血鬼さん, Tonari no Kyūketsuki-san) is a Japanese four-panel manga series by Amatou. It has been serialized since August 2014 in Media Factory's seinen manga magazine Comic Cune, which was originally a magazine supplement in the seinen manga magazine Monthly Comic Alive until August 2015. It was collected in eight tankōbon volumes. An anime television series adaptation by Studio Gokumi and AXsiZ aired between October and December 2018.

== Characters ==
Sophie Twilight (ソフィー・トワイライト, Sofī Towairaito)
Voiced by: Miyu Tomita
An approximately 360-year-old vampire girl who came to Japan in 1986. (Note: The year itself is not mentioned in the anime, but in episode 11, Sophie states the release of Super Mario Bros.: The Lost Levels to be her reason for travelling to Japan.) As a never-aging undead, she is incredibly weak to sunlight and thus usually stays awake during the night. Her diet consists solely of blood, albeit refrigerated as she can't bear to drink it directly from humans. While often maintaining a refined appearance, she enjoys going to comic book conventions and ordering otaku goods.
Akari Amano (天野 灯, Amano Akari)
Voiced by: Yū Sasahara
A school girl who begins living with Sophie after meeting her. She keeps a collection of dolls and is particularly fond of Sophie due to her doll-like appearance.
Hinata Natsuki (夏木 ひなた, Natsuki Hinata)
Voiced by: Lynn
Akari's best friend, who often worries about her.
Ellie (エリー, Erī)
Voiced by: Azumi Waki
Another vampire girl who is a long-time acquaintance of Sophie's. She first meets Akari after having slept for over 100 years in her house in America before later moving into the neighborhood. Her character is based on Elizabeth Báthory. She later falls in love with Hinata.
Sakuya Kurai (倉井 朔夜, Kurai Sakuya)
Voiced by: Rina Hidaka
One of Akari's classmates, who is in love with Yū.
Yū Aoki (青木 夕, Aoki Yū)
Voiced by: Aya Uchida
Another of Akari's classmates.

== Media ==
=== Manga ===
Ms. Vampire Who Lives in My Neighborhood is a four-panel manga series by Amatou, a Japanese manga artist who mainly draws adult comics. It began serialization in Comic Cune's October 2014 issue released on August 27, 2014. Comic Cune was initially a "magazine within a magazine" placed in Monthly Comic Alive, but later became independent of Comic Alive and changed to a formal magazine on August 27, 2015. It was last published in the December 2021 issue on October 27, 2021. The first tankōbon volume of the manga was released on September 26, 2015; eight volumes have been published as of December 27, 2021.

=== Anime ===
An anime television series adaptation co-animated by Studio Gokumi and AXsiZ aired in Japan between October 5 and December 21, 2018, on AT-X and other channels and simulcast on Crunchyroll. Ponimu also simulcasted the series in Indonesia. The series is directed by Noriyaki Akitaya, while Tatsuya Takahashi handled the series composition, Takahiro Sakai designed the characters, and Yoshiaki Fujisawa composed the music. The opening theme is "†Kyūtie Ladies†" (†吸tie Ladies†), and the ending theme is "Happy!! Strange Friends" (HAPPY!!ストレンジフレンズ, Happy! Sutorenji Furenzu), both performed by Miyu Tomita, Yū Sasahara, Lynn, and Azumi Waki. The series ran for 12 episodes.

Official Blu-ray disc copy was released on February 22, 2022, from Discotek Media.

No.	Title (Note: All English titles are taken from Crunchyroll.)	Original release date
1	"Ordinary Citizen of the Dark"; Transliteration: "Yami no Ippan Shimin" (Japanese: 闇の一般市民)	October 5, 2018
Upon getting lost in the woods while looking into a rumor about a doll-like girl, Akari Amano is rescued by a vampire named Sophie Twilight, who takes her to her home to spend the night. As Akari becomes attracted to Sophie and starts coming over every day, Sophie attempts to scare her off with her strength, only to impress her more and ultimately become friends with her. Later, Akari decides that she wants to move in with Sophie, who eventually accepts, thinking it'd be more fun with Akari around.
2	"Akari's Friend"; Transliteration: "Akari no Tomodachi" (Japanese: 灯の友達)	October 12, 2018
Akari accompanies Sophie as she ventures out during the day to attend a book signing, helping her to stay out of the sunlight. The next day, Akari's friend, Hinata Natsuki, comes over to meet Sophie, initially becoming worried upon discovering she's a vampire but soon finding her to be a nice person.
3	"The Vampire Goes to School"; Transliteration: "Kyūketsuki Gakkō e Iku" (Japanese: 吸血鬼学校へ行く)	October 19, 2018
Akari and Sophie come over to Hinata's house, where they have a discussion about their families. Later, Sophie goes to Akari's school, where she is introduced to her classmates, Sakuya Kurai and Yuu Aoki, and stands in for another classmate as she goes to visit her sick sister.
4	"Sophie and Ellie"; Transliteration: "Sofī to Erī" (Japanese: ソフィーとエリー)	October 26, 2018
Akari meets Ellie, a vampire acquaintance of Sophie's who has come from America after a 100-year slumber. Ellie believes that humans and vampires can't be friends, but Akari assures her that such a thing is possible and earns her approval. Afterwards, Ellie decides to move into the neighborhood.
5	"Vampire Cooking"; Transliteration: "Kyūketsuki no Ryōri" (Japanese: 吸血鬼の料理)	November 2, 2018
Hinata and Ellie start off on bad terms after inadvertently touching on each other's personal complexes, but they soon make up with each other after Ellie saves Hinata from falling down the stairs. Later, Sophie decides to try cooking something for Akari with Hinata's help, despite knowing nothing about human cuisine.
6	"Interview with the Vampire"; Transliteration: "Intabyū wizu Vanpaia" (Japanese: インタビューウィズヴァンパイア)	November 9, 2018
Sakuya arrives at Sophie's house to interview her about being a vampire. Later, Sophie, Akari, Ellie, and Hinata go to the mall to pick out clothes for each other.
7	"Summer Break Spent with a Vampire"; Transliteration: "Kyūketsuki to Sugosu Natsuyasumi" (Japanese: 吸血鬼とすごす夏休み)	November 16, 2018
Akari struggles to find ways to spend her summer break with Sophie, since most summer activities involve sunlight or running water. She eventually gets the opportunity to invite Sophie and Ellie to a summer festival to watch a fireworks show. Later, Sophie finds herself stuck under a tree during the daytime by herself until Akari comes to rescue her.
8	"The Last Day of Summer Break"; Transliteration: "Natsuyasumi no Saigo no Hi" (Japanese: 夏休みの最後の日)	November 23, 2018
Akari and Hinata get together to try and finish off their homework before summer break is over. On the final day of the break, the girls take a trip to Akihabara, where they shop for manga, play at an arcade, and visit a maid café.
9	"Vampire VS Vampire Hunter"; Transliteration: "Kyūketsuki bāsasu Vanpaia Hantā" (Japanese: 吸血鬼VSヴァンパイアハンター)	November 30, 2018
Sophie and Ellie attend the culture festival at Akari's school, checking out the various exhibits. Upon finding a vampire hunter collapsed on the street, the girls have her stay the night while trying to keep Sophie and Ellie's identities a secret. Later, the girls go to a hot spring together.
10	"The Vampire and the End of the Year"; Transliteration: "Kyūketsuki to Nenmatsu" (Japanese: 吸血鬼と年末)	December 7, 2018
Everyone gets together at Sophie's house for a Halloween party. Later, the girls exchange presents during Christmas before ringing in the New Year together.
11	"Cold Season"; Transliteration: "Kaze no Kisetsu" (Japanese: 風邪の季節)	December 14, 2018
The girls help Sophie clean up one of her rooms, only to find themselves getting distracted by all the things Sophie had collected over the past few hundred years. Later, Akari catches a cold, prompting the others to take care of her.
12	"The Vampire and the Changing Seasons"; Transliteration: "Meguru Kisetsu to Kyūketsuki" (Japanese: 巡る季節と吸血鬼)	December 21, 2018
Sophie and Ellie run out of blood and become unable to order more online, leading them to grow gradually hungrier. Akari offers to let them drink her blood, but they decline as they don't want to drink blood from a friend, eventually managing to get their delivery in. Later, Akari and Sophie go on a night walk together, running into many familiar faces and visiting the spot in the forest where they first met.
