= Elf-sensei no Toilet wa Doko desu ka? =

Japanese manga series

- First tankōbon volume cover

エルフ先生のトイレはどこですか？ (Erufu Sensei no Toire wa Doko desu ka?)
- Genre: Comedy; Fantasy; Reverse isekai
- Manga
- Written by: Chizuna Nakajima
- Published by: Media Factory
- Imprint: MFC Cune Series
- Magazine: Comic Cune
- Original run: January 26, 2024 – present
- Volumes: 2
- Anime television series

Elf-sensei no Toilet wa Doko desu ka? (Japanese: エルフ先生のトイレはどこですか？, Hepburn: Erufu Sensei no Toire wa Doko desu ka?; lit. 'Where is the Elf Teacher's Toilet?') is a Japanese manga series written and illustrated by Chizuna Nakajima. It was originally serialized in Media Factory's seinen manga magazine Comic Cune from January 2024 to January 2025, and resumed serialization in the same magazine in September 2026. An anime television series adaptation has been announced.

== Plot ==
Eruru Shikkoshi is a teacher in training who recently began teaching at an all-boys school. Being an elf, she can only relieve herself in natural settings, causing friction in her city-based daily life. She frequently waits until the last second to urinate, leading to accidents. However, her urine has magical powers, causing flowers to bloom wherever she pees.

== Media ==
=== Manga ===
Written and illustrated by Chizuna Nakajima, Elf-sensei no Toilet wa Doko desu ka? was originally serialized in Media Factory's seinen manga magazine Comic Cune from January 26, 2024, to January 27, 2025. The series resumed serialization in the same magazine on September 26, 2026. Its chapters have been compiled into two tankōbon volumes as of February 2025.

No.	Release date	ISBN
1	July 26, 2024	978-4-04-683740-0
2	February 27, 2025	978-4-04-684484-2

=== Anime ===
An anime television series adaptation produced under WWWave Corporation's Deregula anime label was announced on September 25, 2026.
