= I Don't Know Which Is Love =

Japanese manga series

- First tankōbon volume cover

どれが恋かがわからない (Dore ga Koi ka ga Wakaranai)
- Genre: Romantic comedy; Yuri
- Manga
- Written by: Tamamushi Oku
- Published by: Media Factory
- English publisher: NA: Yen Press
- Imprint: MFC Cune Series
- Magazine: Comic Cune
- Original run: August 27, 2021 – present
- Volumes: 7

I Don't Know Which Is Love (Japanese: どれが恋かがわからない, Hepburn: Dore ga Koi ka ga Wakaranai) is a Japanese yuri manga written and illustrated by Tamamushi Oku. It has been serialized in Media Factory's Comic Cune since August 2021, and is licensed in English by Yen Press.

The series follows Mei Soraike as she begins college hoping to find a girlfriend.

== Synopsis ==
After Mei Soraike tried to confess her love to her best friend during their high school graduation ceremony, she is left crushed as she finds out her friend just got a boyfriend. Wanting to get past her heartbreak, Mei enrols into college with the strong determination to definitely get a girlfriend, which is just as well because she quickly finds herself surrounded by potential prospects.

== Media ==
=== Manga ===
Written and illustrated by Tamamushi Oku, I Don't Know Which Is Love, has been serialized in Media Factory's Comic Cune magazine since August 27, 2021. The series has been collected in seven tankōbon volumes as of May 2026. The series is set to end with the release of its eighth volume.

The series is licensed for an English release in North America by Yen Press.

No.	Original release date	Original ISBN	English release date	English ISBN
1	April 27, 2022	978-4-04-681322-0	August 22, 2023	978-1-9753-6985-9
2	December 27, 2022	978-4-04-681785-3	January 23, 2024	978-1-9753-8789-1
3	August 25, 2023	978-4-04-682804-0	July 22, 2025	979-8-8554-1337-3
4	June 27, 2024	978-4-04-683736-3	December 16, 2025	979-8-8554-1562-9
5	January 27, 2025	978-4-04-684485-9	August 25, 2026	979-8-8554-2442-3
6	September 27, 2025	978-4-04-685075-1	December 15, 2026	979-8-8554-3929-8
7	May 27, 2026	978-4-04-660028-8	—	—

=== Other ===
On May 9, 2022, Kadokawa released a voice comic reading of the first chapter, featuring Sukoya Kana as Mei, Marika Kōno as Riri, Kanna Nakamura as Maria, Yumiri Hanamori as Minato, Kanako Nomura as Karin and Hitomi Ueda as Kaoru.

== Reception ==
Rebecca Silverman of Anime News Network gave I Don't Know Which Is Love's first volume an overall B− rating, praising Tamamushi Oku's art for being expressive and effective at capturing the different energies of each character. She summarized that volume 1 was a "solid introduction that has a lot of gags – and cheesecake – for fans of harem manga, yuri manga, and especially for both."
