= Meshi Tero-kei Gradol wa Gaman Dekinai!? =

Japanese manga series

- First tankōbon volume cover

飯テロ系グラドルは我慢できない!?
- Genre: Gourmet
- Manga
- Written by: Mekimeki
- Published by: Media Factory
- Imprint: MFC Cune Series
- Magazine: Comic Cune
- Original run: May 27, 2024 – present
- Volumes: 3

Meshi Tero-kei Gradol wa Gaman Dekinai!? (飯テロ系グラドルは我慢できない!?) is a Japanese manga series written and illustrated by Mekimeki. It began serialization in Media Factory's Comic Cune magazine in May 2024, and has been compiled into three volumes as of July 2026.

== Plot ==
The series follows Eiko Ōfurita, Shizuka Atami, and Mitsuki Tokufu, three gravure models who are members of the popular group Three Piece. The three idols love food, but their constant eating results in weight gain. With rumors of their apparent weight gain gaining traction on social media, and the possibility of their careers being derailed, the three are forced to go on a diet and to take up exercise to lose weight. However, this proves to be a challenge given the temptation of their love for food remains.

== Characters ==
Mitsuki Tokufu (徳夫 満月, Tokufu Mitsuki)
A 17-year-old gravure model with long black hair. As Three Piece's youngest member, she also has the least experience.
Eiko Ōfurita (大降田 英子, Ōfurita Eiko)
An 18-year-old gravure model with blonde twintailed hair. She is a former child actress and serves as Three Piece's leader.
Shizuka Atami (熱海 静, Atami Shizuka)
A 20-year-old gravure model with long blonde hair.
Yokihito Zendagawa (善田川 良人, Zendagawa Yokihito)
Eiko, Shizuka, and Mitsuki's manager. He warns them that the three will be let go by their agency if they are unable to lose enough weight by Christmas.

== Development ==
Mekimeki was inspired to start the series after noticing how people around them tended to appear thin despite eating a lot. They wanted to create a manga that showed that people could eat delicious food while still maintaining a healthy physique. They watched social media videos of people eating, as well as sometimes eating and preparing the relevant food itself, as inspiration in writing and drawing the scenarios. They were also influenced by their own experiences gaining and losing weight, with them wanting to tackle a usually serious topic in a light-hearted manner. They would often visit restaurants, particularly those that trended online, and use these experiences as influences for the food tasting scenes.

== Publication ==
The series began serialization in Media Factory's Comic Cune magazine on May 27, 2024. The first tankōbon volume was released on October 24, 2024; three volumes have been released as of July 27, 2026.

No.	Release date	ISBN
1	October 24, 2024	978-4-04-684175-9
2	June 27, 2025	978-4-04-684876-5
3	July 27, 2026	978-4-04-660406-4

== Reception ==
A Twitter post by Mekimeki about the series received over 28,000 likes.
