= Pop in Q =

2016 film by Naoki Miyahara

- Theatrical release poster
- Japanese: ポッピンQ
- Revised Hepburn: PoppinQ
- Directed by: Naoki Miyahara
- Screenplay by: Shūko Arai
- Story by: Izumi Todo
- Produced by: Yū Kanemaru
- Starring: Asami Seto; Shiori Izawa; Atsumi Tanezaki; Ari Ozawa; Tomoyo Kurosawa; Marina Tanoue; Kaori Ishihara; Kaede Hondo; M・A・O; Satomi Arai; Unshō Ishizuka; Erii Yamazaki; Azusa Tadokoro; Megumi Toda
- Cinematography: Shunsuke Nakamura
- Edited by: Ryuichi Takita
- Music by: Hiromi Mizutani; Shūji Katayama (Team-MAX)
- Production company: Toei Animation
- Distributed by: Toei Company, Ltd.
- Release date: December 23, 2016
- Running time: 95 minutes
- Country: Japan
- Language: Japanese

Pop in Q (Japanese: ポッピンQ, Hepburn: PoppinQ) is a 2016 Japanese animated fantasy dance film directed by Naoki Miyahara and written by Shūko Arai from an original story conceived by Izumi Todo. Produced by Toei Animation and distributed by Toei Company, the story of the film revolves around five middle school girls being sent to a fantasy world a day before their graduation day, and must avert the crisis through the power of dance and unity. The film stars the voices of Asami Seto, Shiori Izawa, Atsumi Tanezaki, Ari Ozawa, Tomoyo Kurosawa, Marina Tanoue, Kaori Ishihara, Kaede Hondo, M・A・O, Satomi Arai, Unshō Ishizuka, Erii Yamazaki, Azusa Tadokoro and Megumi Toda. It was released in Japan on December 23, 2016.

A crowdfunding campaign for a sequel novella was launched on October 28, 2019, with the goal being reached the following day. A crowdfunding campaign for a second novella was launched on December 7, 2020, and was later reached on January 25, 2021.

== Voice cast ==
- Asami Seto as Isumi Kominato
- Shiori Izawa as Aoi Hioka
- Atsumi Tanezaki as Konatsu Tomodate
- Ari Ozawa as Asahi Ōmichi
- Tomoyo Kurosawa as Saki Tsukui
- Marina Tanoue as Pocon
- Kaori Ishihara as Ruchia
- Kaede Hondo as Daren
- M.A.O as Adona
- Satomi Arai as Rufie
- Unshō Ishizuka as Elder
- Erii Yamazaki as Remy
- Azusa Tadokoro as Miharu Fukamachi
- Megumi Toda as Nana Mitsuhashi

== Promotion ==
The film was announced in April 2015. A teaser trailer was released in March 2016.

== Release ==
In March 2016, it was announced in the teaser that the film is scheduled for release in the winter of 2016. A trailer released in July 2016 announced that the film was scheduled for release in January 2017. Another trailer released in September 2016 announced that the film would be released on December 23, 2016. It premiered across 221 theaters in Japan.
