= Yuri Life =

Japanese manga series

- First tankōbon volume cover

ゆりぐらし (Yurigurashi)
- Genre: Romance; Slice of Life; Yuri
- Manga
- Written by: Kurukuruhime
- Published by: Kadokawa
- English publisher: NA: Yen Press
- Original run: March 18, 2015 – September 9, 2017
- Volumes: 1

Yuri Life (Japanese: ゆりぐらし, Hepburn: Yurigurashi) is a Japanese yuri manga series written and illustrated by Kurukuruhime. It was first published on Kurukuruhime's Twitter and Pixiv accounts, after which it was published by Kadokawa in 2018 as a single tankōbon volume. Yuri Life follows everyday romances of various couples living together. It is licensed for an English-language release by Yen Press.

== Synopsis ==
The series follows the everyday romances of women living together. From a web designer and her illustrator girlfriend to a systems engineer and the Shinigami who loves her, each happy couple experiences their own version of domestic bliss.

== Publication ==
Written and illustrated by Kurukuruhime, Yuri Life was published online to Twitter and Pixiv between March 18, 2015, and September 9, 2017. The series was then collected into a single tankōbon volume by Kadokawa on May 26, 2018.

The series is licensed for an English release in North America by Yen Press.

No.	Original release date	Original ISBN	English release date	English ISBN
1	May 26, 2018	978-4-04-069824-3	July 30, 2019	978-1-9753-5727-6

== Reception ==
Reviewing the series for Otaku USA, Brittany Vincent recommended the manga, noting that "manga fans looking for more realistic depictions of lesbian relationships will especially enjoy it. Yuri Life is a sweet reminder that, even in the most difficult modern times, love is beautiful." Erica Friedman of Yuricon gave the series a similarly positive review, giving it an overall rating of 8 and stating that "as a series of entertaining slice-of-life webcomics that feature adult women living lives with the women they love, you can't really beat Yuri Life."

Rebecca Silverman of Anime News Network was less impressed, giving Yuri Life an overall C− rating, remarking that "Yuri Life is most likely to only appeal to die-hard fans of yuri manga. It isn't terrible, but it is kind of dull, and the stories aren't long enough to really get us invested in the characters or their lives."
