= Erii Yamazaki =

Japanese voice actress and singer

- 山崎 エリイ
- Born: November 20, 1997 (age 28); Chiba Prefecture, Japan
- Occupations: Voice actress and singer
- Years active: 2013–present

Erii Yamazaki (山崎 エリイ, Yamazaki Erii; born November 20, 1997) is a Japanese voice actress and singer from Chiba Prefecture, Japan, affiliated with Horipro.

== Voice roles ==
=== Anime ===
Year	Title	Role
2013	Samurai Flamenco	Moe Morita
2014	Inugami-san to Nekoyama-san	Hibari Torikai
2014	World Conquest Zvezda Plot	Roboko
2014	Marua-no-Bo-Ken	Mu
2014	Meshimase Lodoss-tō Senki: Sorette Oishii no?	Eto
2015	Re-Kan!	Macoto Ogawa
2015	Hyper Galaxy Fleet	Irma Mio
2016	Pan de Peace!	Yū Aizawa
2016	Pop in Q	Remy
2017	Nyanko Days	Shii
2017	Frame Arms Girl	Materia Sisters

=== Video games ===
Year	Title	Role
2014	Omega Quintet	Aria
