= Naomi Ōzora =

Japanese voice actress (born 1989)

- 大空 直美
- Born: February 4, 1989 (age 37); Miyagi Prefecture, Japan
- Education: Ritsumeikan University
- Occupation: Voice actress
- Years active: 2012–present
- Agent: Aoni Production
- Height: 153 cm (5 ft 0 in)
- Children: 1

Naomi Ōzora (大空 直美, Ōzora Naomi; born February 4, 1989) is a Japanese voice actress. Her major voice roles include Hana Uzaki in Uzaki-chan Wants to Hang Out!, Jahy in The Great Jahy Will Not Be Defeated!, Inari Fushimi in Inari, Konkon, Koi Iroha, Chio Miyamo in Chio's School Road, Kiriha in Tsugumomo, Satania in Gabriel DropOut, Ruti Ragnason in Banished from the Hero's Party, Chieri Ogata in The Idolmaster Cinderella Girls, and Tamamo Cross in Umamusume: Pretty Derby.

== Biography ==
Ōzora was born in Miyagi Prefecture. She passed through Kanagawa Prefecture and spent the kindergarten period in Ibaraki Prefecture. Later, she spent time in Osaka Prefecture from elementary school, but once lived in Shikoku.

In June 2012, she made her voice acting debut in Saint Seiya Omega.

In January 2014, she had her first starring role as Inari Fushimi in Inari, Konkon, Koi Iroha.

On May 25, 2023, she announced on her Twitter that she was married in February and she is expecting her first child.

Ōzora is affiliated with Aoni Production.

== Filmography ==
=== Anime ===
2013

- Noucome – Yuragi Hakoniwa
- Servant × Service – Seller Girl
- Tanken Driland: Sennen no Mahō – Amuze
- Genshiken: Second Generation – Susanna Hopkins

2014

- Inari, Konkon, Koi Iroha – Inari
- Marvel Disk Wars: The Avengers – Jessica Shannon
- Sega Hard Girls – SG-1000 II
- Chaika: The Coffin Princess – Karen Bombardier
- Tsubu Doll – Jun

2015

- The Idolmaster Cinderella Girls – Chieri Ogata
- Triage X – Hinako Kominato
- Robot Girls Z+ – Bal-chan

2016

- Maho Girls PreCure! – Cissy
- Matoi the Sacred Slayer – Yuma Kusanagi
- Momokuri – Norika Mizuyama
- Pretty Guardian Sailor Moon Crystal Season III – Tellu

2017

- Gabriel Dropout – Satanichia McDowell Kurumizawa
- Nyanko Days – Azumi Shiratori
- Tsugumomo – Kiriha
- Kemono Friends – Black-tailed Prairie Dog (ep. 5, 7, 12)
- One Piece – Charlotte Anana

2018

- Chio's School Road – Chio Miyamo

2019

- Pastel Memories – Michi Edogawabashi
- Wataten!: An Angel Flew Down to Me – Kanon Konomori
- Kandagawa Jet Girls – Pan Dina

2020

- Tsugu Tsugumomo – Kiriha
- Uzaki-chan Wants to Hang Out! – Hana Uzaki
- Maesetsu! – Mafuyu Kogarashi

2021

- Heaven's Design Team – Meido
- World Trigger Season 2 – Maori Hosoi
- Bakugan: Geogan Rising – Fenneca
- Remake Our Life! – Keiko Tomioka
- The Great Jahy Will Not Be Defeated! – Jahy
- Banished from the Hero's Party – Ruti

2022

- Princess Connect! Re:Dive Season 2 – Yuki
- Bakugan: Evolutions – Fenneca
- Call of the Night – Midori Kohakobe
- Lucifer and the Biscuit Hammer – Samidare Asahina
- Hanabi-chan Is Often Late – Mogumogu Chō Higashisakura
- Uzaki-chan Wants to Hang Out! ω – Hana Uzaki

2023

- Reborn to Master the Blade: From Hero-King to Extraordinary Squire – Ripple
- Rokudo's Bad Girls – Sayuri Osanada
- World Dai Star – Panda Yanagiba
- Level 1 Demon Lord and One Room Hero – Demon Lord
- Sylvanian Families Freya no Go for Dream! – Coco Chocolate
- A Playthrough of a Certain Dude's VRMMO Life – Rona
- I'm Giving the Disgraced Noble Lady I Rescued a Crash Course in Naughtiness – Miaha Basutetosu
- Scott Pilgrim Takes Off – Roxie Richter

2024

- Sasaki and Peeps – Shizuka Futari
- Banished from the Hero's Party 2nd Season – Ruti
- Mysterious Disappearances – Jormun Himeuo
- Sakuna: Of Rice and Ruin – Sakuna
- Babies of Bread – Cream Bun Baby 4

2025

- Umamusume: Cinderella Gray – Tamamo Cross
- Dandadan 2nd Season – Chiquitita
- Watari-kun's ****** Is About to Collapse – Tamayo Watari
- Call of the Night Season 2 – Midori Kohakobe

2026

- Please Excuse My Younger Brothers – Ito Narita

=== Films ===
2015

- Girls und Panzer der Film – Fukuda Haru

2020

- High School Fleet: The Movie – Susan "Sue" Reyes

2022

- Wataten!: An Angel Flew Down to Me: Precious Friends – Kanon Konomori

=== Video games ===
2011

- The Legend of Heroes: Trails to Azure – Duvalie

2014

- The Legend of Heroes: Trails of Cold Steel II – Duvalie

2016

- Ys VIII: Lacrimosa of Dana – Dina, Griselda

2017

- Fire Emblem Heroes – Ylgr, Lethe
- The Legend of Heroes: Trails of Cold Steel III – Duvalie
- Granblue Fantasy – The Sun
- Yuki Yuna is a Hero: Hanayui no Kirameki – Yumiko Miroku
- MapleStory – Cadena (Female)

2018

- Alice Gear Aegis – Aika Aikawa
- Magia Record – Himika Mao
- Valkyria Chronicles 4 – Nikola Graf
- The Legend of Heroes: Trails of Cold Steel IV – Duvalie

2019

- Dead or Alive Xtreme Venus Vacation – Kanna
- Konosuba: Fantastic Days – Amy

2020

- Kandagawa Jet Girls – Pan Dina
- Girls' Frontline – Falcon, QJY-88
- Azur Lane – Perseus, Patricia Abelheim
- Sakuna: Of Rice and Ruin – Sakuna
- Touhou Spell Bubble – Marisa Kirisame
- Atelier Ryza 2: Lost Legends & the Secret Fairy – Patricia Abelheim
- The Legend of Heroes: Trails into Reverie – Duvalie

2021

- Umamusume: Pretty Derby – Tamamo Cross
- Metallic Child – Rona
- Shin Megami Tensei V – Amanozako
- Digimon Survive – Lopmon
- WitchSpring3 Re:Fine – The Story of Eirudy – Esther, Judith

2023

- Atelier Ryza 3: Alchemist of the End & the Secret Key – Patricia Abelheim
- Arknights – Typhon
- Fate/Grand Order – Saika Magoichi
- Girls' Frontline 2: Exilium – Colphne

2025

- Groove Coaster Future Performers – Rikka Sarashina
- Zenless Zone Zero – Zhao
