= Internet Buzzword Award =

Internet award in Japan

Internet Buzzword Award ネット流行語大賞
- Awarded for: Internet buzzword
- Country: Japan
- First award: 2007
- Website: getnews.jp/tag/ネット流行語大賞

The Internet Buzzword Award (ネット流行語大賞, Internet Buzzword Award) is a Japanese award that determines the most popular buzzwords on the Internet during a year.

This article also deals with the Anime Buzzword Award, which has been held in conjunction with the awards since 2013.

== Overview ==
The Internet Buzzword of the Year Award is selected annually by the online media company Gadget Tsushin Launched in 2007, candidates are solicited from the members of 2channel search, and the popular words are decided by the votes of those members. Since 2013, the "Anime Buzzword Awards" have been held only for words related to anime that aired that year.

Since the Grand Prize is held at the end of the year, words that were popular at the end of the year have a comparative advantage. Also, due to the selection method, words that were popular on 2channel and Nico Nico Douga tend to be selected. Many people may be more familiar with this award than the "New Word and Popular Word Awards" sponsored by You Can.

== Award-winning terms ==
Year	Award Type	Award	Buzzword	Award Winner / Recipient
2007	Grand Prize		fabricate	The Asahi Shimbun
2007	Silver Prize		Sweets	N/A
2007	Bronze Prize		leeway	Ministry of Education, Culture, Sports, Science and Technology (MEXT)
2008	Grand Prize		I'm not like you.	Yasuo Fukuda
2008	Silver Prize		～Yes, I understand.	The Idolmaster
2008	Bronze Prize		Go ahead and take your time!	Touhou Project
2009	Grand Prize		But only if you are good looking	All good looking women
2009	Silver Prize		How did this happen?	Mr. Manjero
2009	Bronze Prize		What's wrong with being naked?	Tsuyoshi Kusanagi
2010	Grand Prize		Are you sure you're equipped for this?	Takeyasu Sawaki
2010	Silver Prize		Outflow (sengoku38)	Yoshito Sengoku
2010	Bronze Prize		～Squid? ～Squid.	Masahiro Anbe
2011	Grand Prize		Pop-pop-pop!	AC Japan
2011	Silver Prize		Nadeshiko Japan	Japan Women's National Soccer Team
2011	Bronze Prize		Make a contract with me and become a XX!	Kyubey (Puella Magi Madoka Magica)
2012	Grand Prize		stealth marketing	N/A
2012	Silver Prize		(」・ω・)」/Woo! (」・ω・)」/nya!	Nyaruko: Crawling with Love
2012	Bronze Prize		┌（┌ ＾o＾）┐ I'm going backwards...	Nyaruko: Crawling with Love
2013	Internet Buzzword Award	Grand Prize	When do we do it? Now!	Osamu Hayashi
2013	Internet Buzzword Award	Silver Prize	Gekiko Pun Pun Maru	N/A
2013	Internet Buzzword Award	Bronze Prize	Double back!	Naoki Hanzawa
2013	Anime Buzzword Award	Grand Prize	Nyanpasuu	Non Non Biyori
2013	Anime Buzzword Award	Silver Prize	I'll destroy	Attack on Titan
2013	Anime Buzzword Award	Bronze Prize	I can only swim free	Free!
2014	Internet Buzzword Award	Grand Prize	There are STAP cells	Haruko Obokata
2014	Internet Buzzword Award	Silver Prize	Hmmmmmmmmmmmmmmmmmmmmmmm...	Ryutaro Nonomura
2014	Internet Buzzword Award	Bronze Prize	No ~ No	Nippon Elekitel Rengo
2014	Anime Buzzword Award	Grand Prize	Lick Lick Lick Lick	JoJo's Bizarre Adventure: Stardust Crusaders
2014	Anime Buzzword Award	Silver Prize	Monge	Yo-kai Watch
2014	Anime Buzzword Award	Bronze Prize	It's because of youkai.	Yo-kai Watch
2015	Internet Buzzword Award	Grand Prize	Goromaru	Goromaru Ayumu
2015	Internet Buzzword Award	Silver Prize	Payopayochin	Former F-Secure employee
2015	Internet Buzzword Award	Bronze Prize	ISIS / Islamic State	N/A
2015	Anime Buzzword Award	Grand Prize	Ah ... I'll tell you what happened right now!	JoJo's Bizarre Adventure: Stardust Crusade
2015	Anime Buzzword Award	Silver Prize	Example string / string god	Is It Wrong to Try to Pick Up Girls in a Dungeon?
2015	Anime Buzzword Award	Bronze Prize	Tuna bowl	Mobile Suit Gundam: Iron-Blooded Orphans
2016	Internet Buzzword Award	Grand Prize	PPAP / Pen-Pineapple Appo Pen	Pico Taro
2016	Internet Buzzword Award	Silver Prize	Pokemon GO	Pokémon Go
2016	Internet Buzzword Award	Bronze Prize	The nursery school fell in Japan	Hatena Anonymous Diary'
2016	Anime Buzzword Award	Grand Prize	I just loved it	Sound! Euphonium 2
2016	Anime Buzzword Award	Silver Prize	Garupan is good	Girls und Panzer der Film
2016	Anime Buzzword Award	Bronze Prize	I'll do my best today as well	New Game!
2017	Internet Buzzword Award	Grand Prize	Nintendo Switch	Nintendo Switch
2017	Internet Buzzword Award	Silver Prize	72 hours Honne TV	Goro Inagaki, Tsuyoshi Kusanagi, Shingo Katori
2017	Internet Buzzword Award	Bronze Prize	This hugger!	Mayuko Toyota
2017	Anime Buzzword Award	Grand Prize	Dawn!	The Laughing Salesman
2017	Anime Buzzword Award	Silver Prize	Yay! / Ta-no-shi! / great!	Kemono Friends
2017	Anime Buzzword Award	Bronze Prize	It won't stop ...	Mobile Suit Gundam: Iron-Blooded Orphans
2018	Internet Buzzword Award	Grand Prize	Virtual YouTuber / VTuber	VTuber
2018	Internet Buzzword Award	Silver Prize	The last ○○ in Heisei	N/A
2018	Internet Buzzword Award	Bronze Prize	It 's not odd	Takigawa Daini High School
2018	Anime Buzzword Award	Grand Prize	Toru Amuro	Case Closed: Zero the Enforcer
2018	Anime Buzzword Award	Silver Prize	Amuro woman	Case Closed: Zero the Enforcer
2018	Anime Buzzword Award	Bronze Prize	Well, it's anti.	Pop Team Epic
2019	Internet Buzzword Award	Grand Prize	Destroy NHK	Takashi Tachibana
2019	Internet Buzzword Award	Silver Prize	N country party / Party that protects the people from NHK	N/A
2019	Internet Buzzword Award	Bronze Prize	Senior citizen / Senior innocence	N/A
2019	Anime Buzzword Award	Grand Prize	Sesame pickpocket fucking bird	Kemono Friends 2
2019	Anime Buzzword Award	Silver Prize	Shamiko is bad	The Demon Girl Next Door
2019	Anime Buzzword Award	Bronze Prize	Ikiri Sabataro	Fate/Grand Order - Absolute Demonic Front: Babylonia
2020	Internet Buzzword Award	Grand Prize	Demon Slayer: Kimetsu no Yaiba	Demon Slayer: Kimetsu no Yaiba
2020	Internet Buzzword Award	Silver Prize	It's dense! - Atsumi / Atsumare Animal Crossing	Yuriko Koike - Animal Crossing: New Horizons
2020	Internet Buzzword Award	Bronze Prize	Corona / New Coronavirus / COVID-19	Coronavirus
2020	Anime Buzzword Award	Grand Prize	breathing	Demon Slayer: Kimetsu no Yaiba
2020	Anime Buzzword Award	Silver Prize	Total concentration	Demon Slayer: Kimetsu no Yaiba
2020	Anime Buzzword Award	Bronze Prize	Mr.Kyojuro Rengoku, the 20 billion man.	Demon Slayer: Kimetsu no Yaiba
2021	Internet Buzzword Award	Grand Prize	Umamusume	Umamusume: Pretty Derby
2021	Internet Buzzword Award	Silver Prize	男の人っていつもそうですね…! 私たちのことなんだと思ってるんですか!?	In a World Full of Zombies I'm the Only One Who Doesn't Get Attacked
2021	Internet Buzzword Award	Bronze Prize	The Constitutional Democratic Communist Party	Tarō Asō
2021	Anime Buzzword Award	Grand Prize	Molcar / Pui Pui	Pui Pui Molcar
2021	Anime Buzzword Award	Grand Prize	Mafty syntax, "Let's do it, Mafty!" "There will no problem!" "Is it Gumdam!?"	Mobile Suit Gundam: Hathaway's Flash
2021	Anime Buzzword Award	Silver Prize	Are there any fence-sitters here?	Tokyo Revengers
2021	Anime Buzzword Award	Silver Prize	Uma pyoi	Umamusume: Pretty Derby
2021	Anime Buzzword Award	Bronze Prize	Dances for making X reflect themselves	KXVO
2022	Internet Buzzword Award	Grand Prize	おとわっか	Final Fantasy X, Puella Magi Madoka Magica
2022	Internet Buzzword Award	Silver Prize	X finalized	Shūkan Bunshun
2022	Internet Buzzword Award	Bronze Prize	GaaSyy MB / GaaSyy cannon	GaaSyy
2022	Anime Buzzword Award	Grand Prize	Uta	One Piece Film: Red
2022	Anime Buzzword Award	Silver Prize	Fish--	Lycoris Recoil
2022	Anime Buzzword Award	Silver Prize	Anya knows	Spy × Family
2022	Anime Buzzword Award	Bronze Prize	My shitty double standard dad	Mobile Suit Gundam: The Witch from Mercury
2023	Internet Buzzword Award	Grand Prize	Tax-adding glasses	Fumio Kishida
2023	Internet Buzzword Award	Silver Prize	The Colabo problem	
2023	Internet Buzzword Award	Silver Prize	ちょんまげ小僧 / ひき肉です	
2023	Internet Buzzword Award	Bronze Prize	Education Education Education Education Education Education Education Education Education Education Education Education Education Education Education Education Education Education Death Penalty Death Penalty Death Penalty Death Penalty Death Penalty Death Penalty Death Penalty Death Penalty Death Penalty Education Education Education Education Education Education Education Education Education Education Education Education Education Education Education Education Education Education	Koichi Kaneshige, former Executive Vice President of Big Motor
2023	Anime Buzzword Award	Grand Prize	"Kimi wa Kanpeki de Kyuukyoku no Getter"	Oshi no Ko / Shin Getter Robo vs Neo Getter Robo
2023	Anime Buzzword Award	Silver Prize	Ash Ketchum resigns	Pokémon Journeys: The Series
2023	Anime Buzzword Award	Bronze Prize	Don't do it!	Mobile Suit Gundam: The Witch from Mercury
2024	Internet Buzzword Award	Grand Prize	まいたけダンス	Juufuutei Raden
2024	Internet Buzzword Award	Silver Prize	Yami Baito / White cases	
2024	Internet Buzzword Award	Bronze Prize	No-buying uncle (at the game)	Yusuf Dikeç
2024	Anime Buzzword Award	Grand Prize	Tsumugi, I am so happy	Himitsu no AiPri
2024	Anime Buzzword Award	Silver Prize	"Shikanoko Nokonoko Koshitantan"	My Deer Friend Nokotan
2024	Anime Buzzword Award	Bronze Prize	Himmel theory / Himmel syntax, "It's what Himmel the hero would have done"	Frieren: Beyond Journey's End
2025	Internet Buzzword Award	Grand Prize	"Gah, I'm dead." "Rest in peace, please."	NanJ
2025	Internet Buzzword Award	Silver Prize	Ruby! Yes! What do you like?	"Ai Scream!" by AiScReam
2025	Internet Buzzword Award	Bronze Prize	Ehho Ehho	
2025	Anime Buzzword Award	Grand Prize	Hiroshi Nohara's Domain Expansion	Nohara Hiroshi Hirumeshi no Ryūgi
2025	Anime Buzzword Award	Silver Prize	It's Renako's fault	There's No Freaking Way I'll be Your Lover! Unless...
2025	Anime Buzzword Award	Bronze Prize	By the way, what the hell is a tassel?!	Takopi's Original Sin
