= Vault (gymnastics) =

Artistic gymnastics apparatus which gymnasts perform on

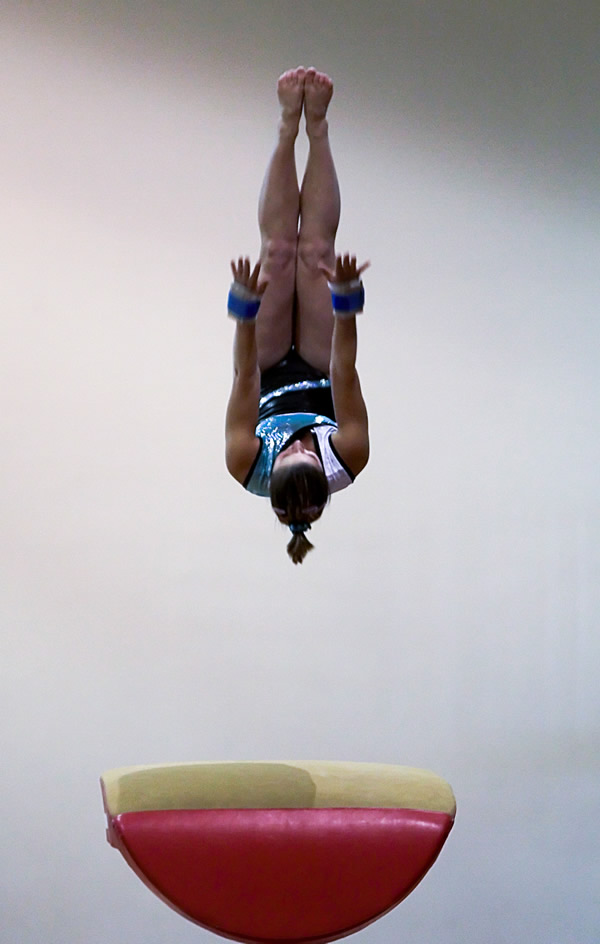
Vault figure

The vault is an artistic gymnastics maneuver typically performed on a pommel horse or a vaulting table. Both male and female gymnasts perform the vault. The English abbreviation for the event in gymnastics scoring is VT.

== The apparatus ==
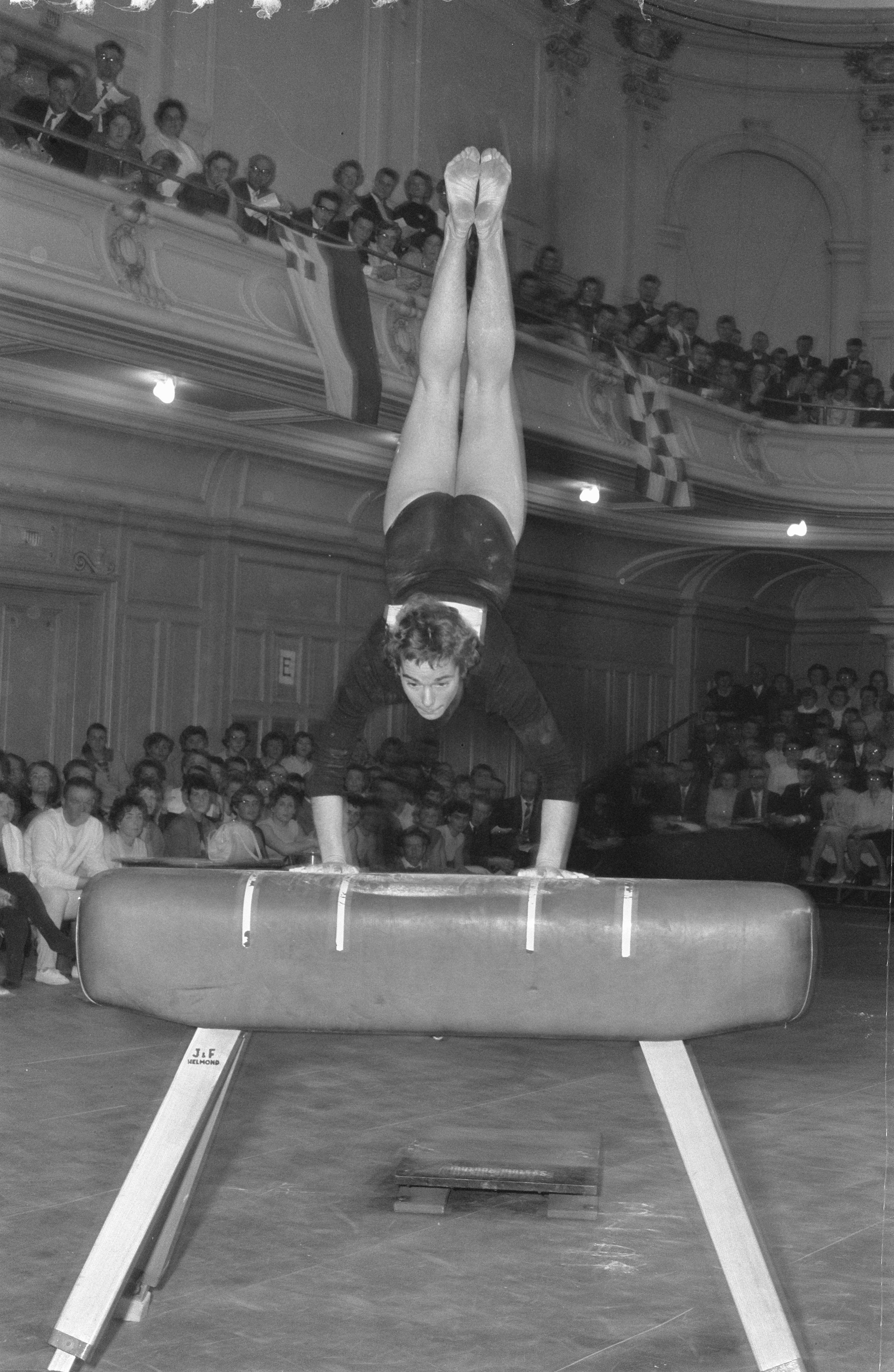
Original vaulting horse configuration (women)

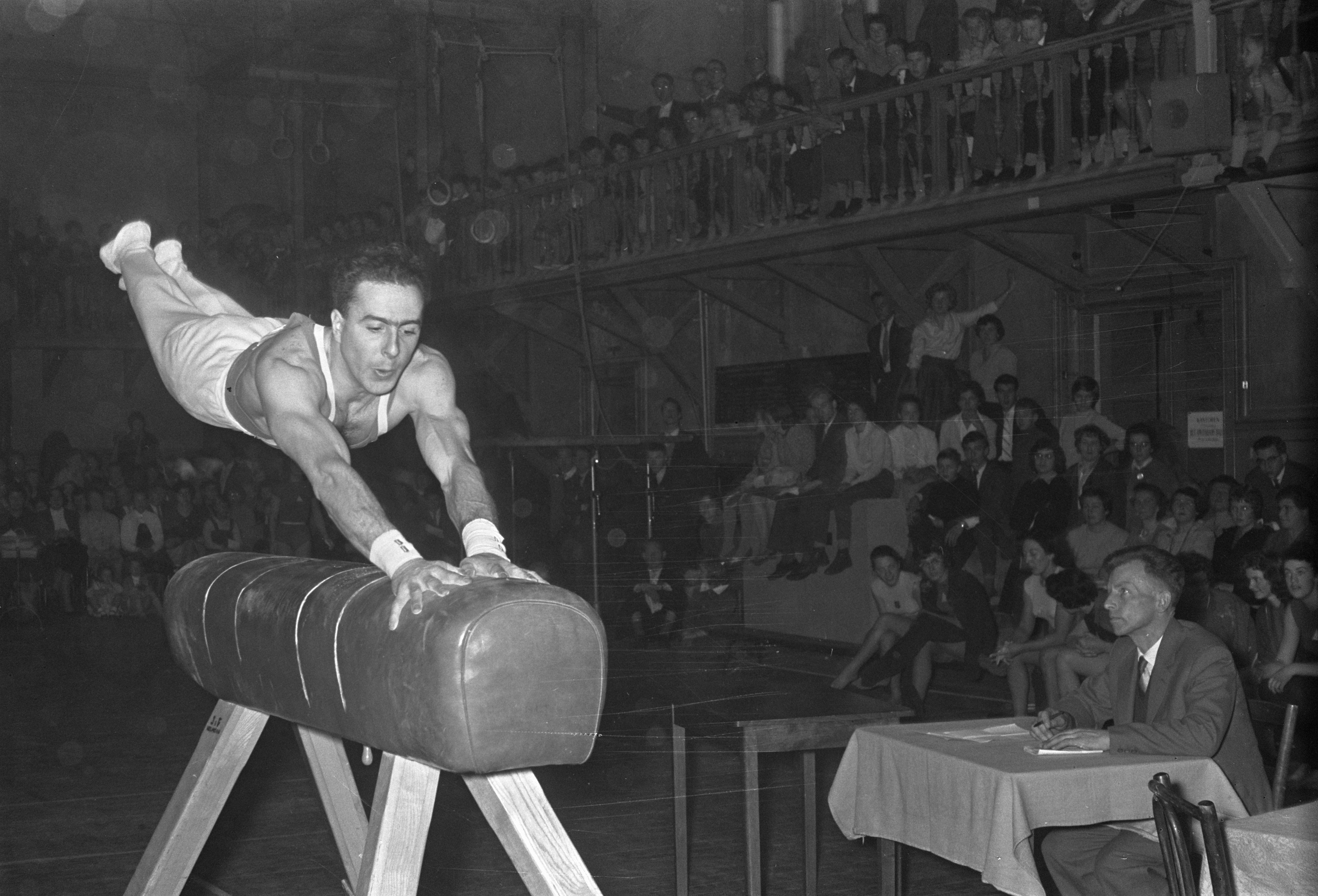
Original vaulting horse configuration (men)

German Friedrich Ludwig Jahn popularized the vault's early forms. The apparatus itself originated as a "horse", much like the pommel horse but without the handles; it was sometimes known as the vaulting horse. The horse was set up with its long dimension perpendicular to the run for women, and parallel for men. The vaulting horse was the apparatus used in the Olympics for over a century, beginning with the Men's vault in the first modern Olympics and ending with the Gymnastics at the 2000 Summer Olympics.

Following an accident in 1988 and compounded by incidents in 1998 and 2000, International Gymnastics Federation (FIG) re-evaluated and changed the apparatus, citing both safety reasons and the desire to facilitate more impressive acrobatics. The 2001 World Artistic Gymnastics Championships were the first international competition to make use of the "vaulting table", an apparatus made by Dutch gymnastics equipment company Janssen-Fritsen since the mid-1990s. It features a flat, larger, and more cushioned surface almost parallel to the floor, which slopes downward at the end closest to the springboard; gymnasts nicknamed it the "tongue". It appears to be somewhat safer than the old apparatus.

=== Dimensions ===
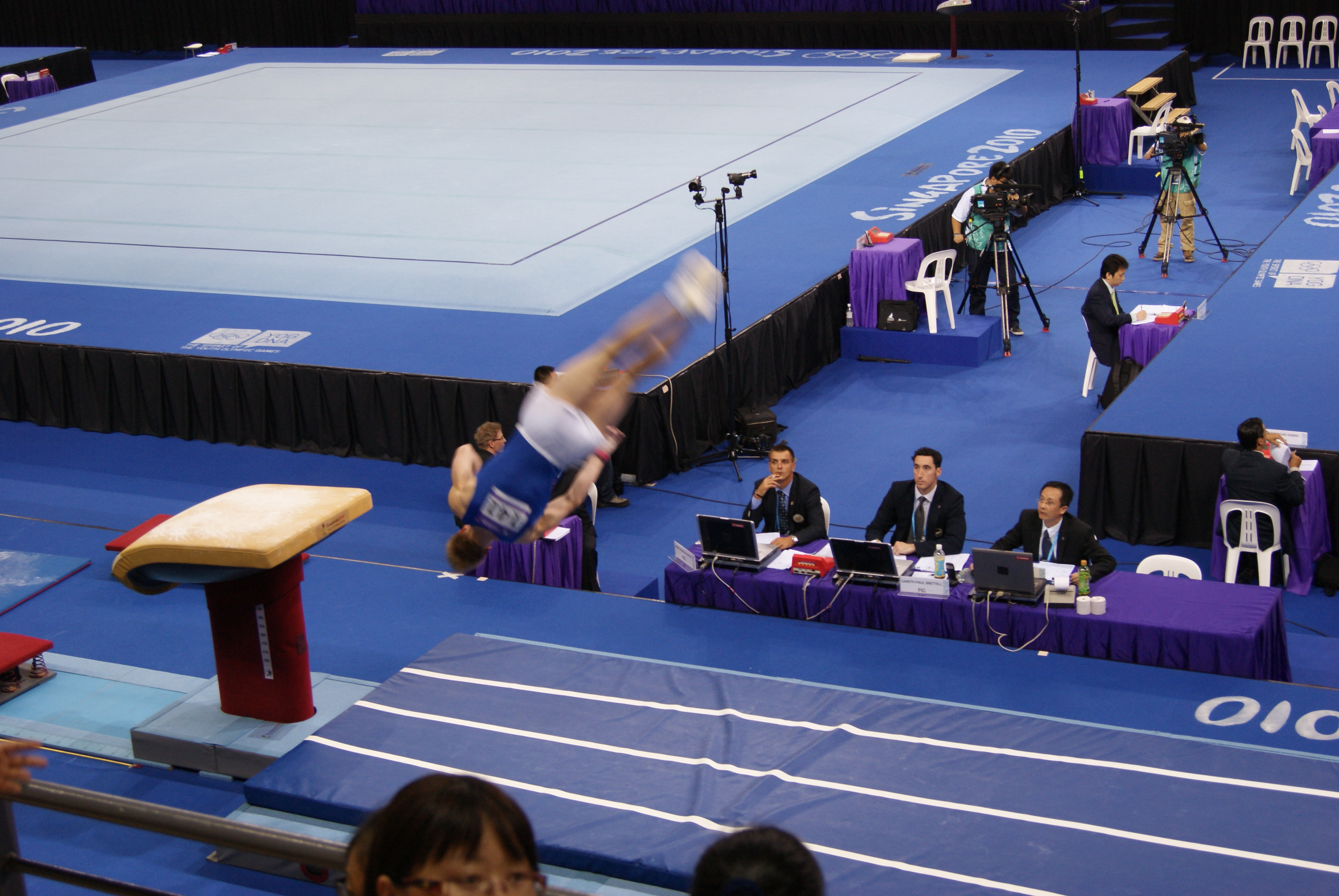
Modern vaulting table

- Length: 120 cm (3 ft 11 in) ± 1 cm (0.39 in)
- Width: 90 cm (2 ft 11 in) ± 1 cm (0.39 in)
- Height:
  - Men: 135 cm (4 ft 5 in) ± 1 cm (0.39 in)
  - Women: 125 cm (4 ft 1 in) ± 1 cm (0.39 in)
- Run-up area:
  - Length: 3,500 cm (114 ft 10 in) ± 10 cm (3.9 in)
  - Width: 100 cm (3 ft 3 in) ± 1 cm (0.39 in)

== Vault as gymnastic skill ==
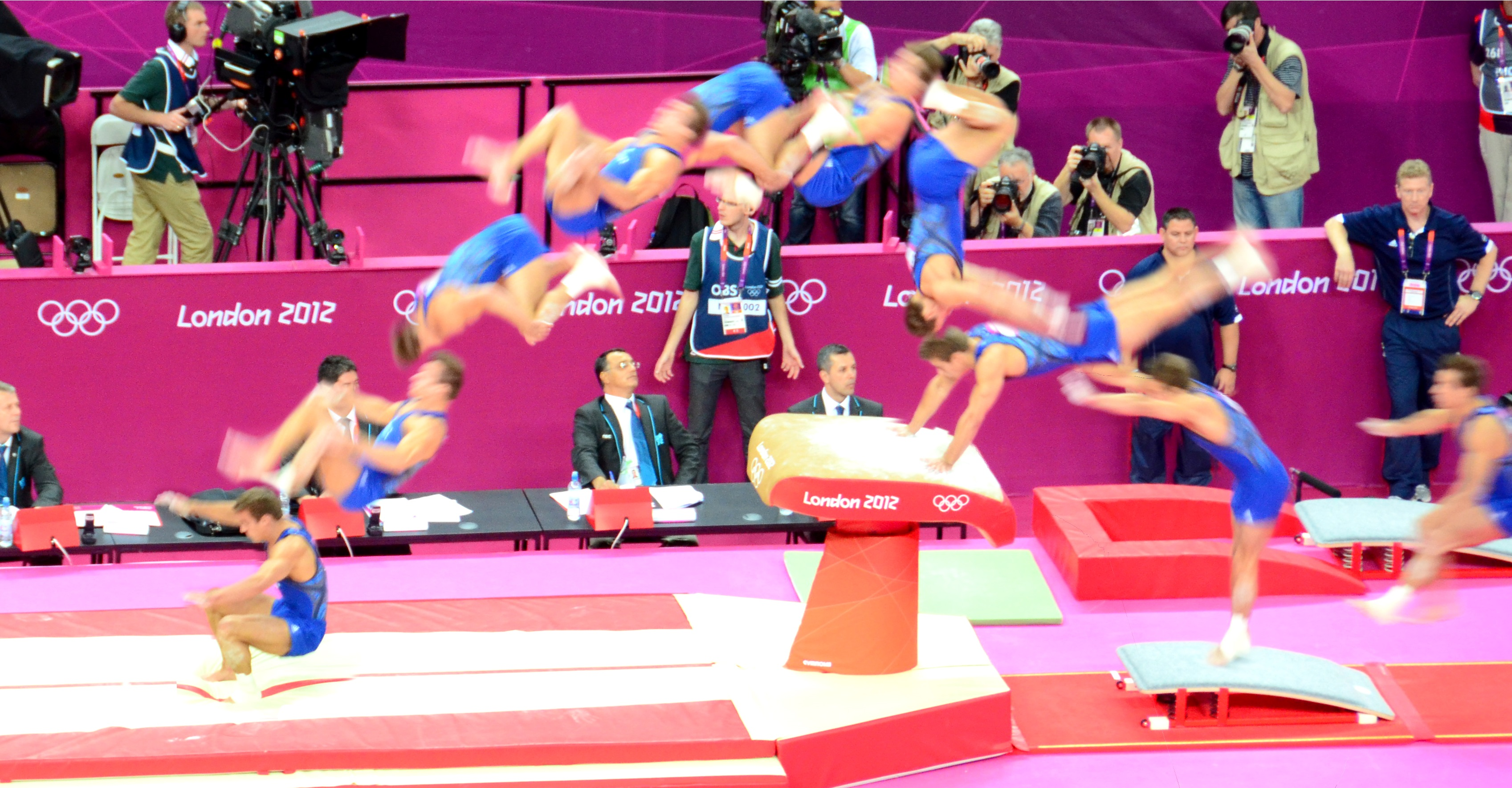
A multiple-exposure image of a gymnast performing a vault (handspring double salto forward tucked) at the 2012 Summer Olympics.

To perform a vault, the gymnast runs down a runway (the run), which is usually padded or carpeted. They hurdle onto a springboard and spring onto the vault with their hands (the preflight or first flight and block). For vaults in the Yurchenko family, the gymnast will put their hands onto a mat that is placed before the springboard, round-off onto the board, and do a back handspring onto the vault. The off-flight may be as simple as leaping over the apparatus or as complicated as executing several twists and turns in the air. The gymnast then lands on the mat on the other side of the apparatus.

The running speed is correlated with the difficulty of the vault performed, with a stronger correlation for women than men, who may not maximize their sprint speed to achieve even the most difficult vaults.

== In competitions ==
=== Event ===
Gymnasts (both male and female) show one vault in Qualification, Team Final, and All Around Final. The gymnasts must perform a second vault during qualifications to qualify for vault apparatus finals. In the Apparatus Finals gymnasts must also show two vaults. For men, the two vaults must be from different element groups, while women must show two vaults with different repulsion and flight phase from the vault table.

=== Scoring ===
The score combines the D-value, the difficulty, and the E-value, the execution.

The projected difficulty is increased with every skill included. Each skill has its own value; the harder the skill, the higher the start value. In 2009, FIG made some changes to put less emphasis on the difficulty and reduce the number of skills required, making the gymnasts focus harder on the perfect execution of the vault.

The execution score is out of 10.0, looking at the form, height, length, and landing. Judges look through four main phases: the preflight, support, after-flight, and landing. Gymnasts are expected to land cleanly, with no hops or steps, and within a set landing zone on the landing mat. Falling or stepping on landing incurs deduction, as will lack of height off the table, or distance from the table.

== Vault families ==
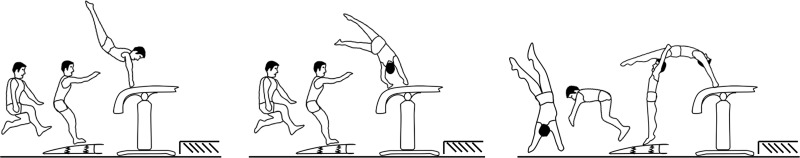
First flight phases of handspring, Tsukahara, and Yurchenko vaults

Vault styles are broken into various groups or families. To compete in a vault final, a gymnast must perform two vaults from different groups whose second flight phase is not identical.

=== Vault groups (men) ===
There are four vault categories for men:

1. Single salto vaults with complex twists.
2. Handspring vaults with or without simple twists, and all double salto fwd.
3. Handspring sideways and Tsukahara vaults with or without simple twists, and all double salto bwd.
4. Round off entry vaults

=== Vault groups (women) ===
There are five vault categories for women:

1. Vault without salto (Handspring, Yamashita, Round-off) with or without LA turn in 1st and/or 2nd flight phase.
2. Handspring fwd with or without 1/1 turn (360°) in 1st flight phase – salto fwd or bwd with or without twist in 2nd flight phase.
3. Handspring with ¼ - ½ turn (90° - 180°) in 1st flight phase (Tsukahara) – salto bwd with or without twist in 2nd flight phase.
4. Round-off (Yurchenko) with or without ¾ turn (270°) in 1st flight phase – salto bwd with or without twist in 2nd flight phase.
5. Round-off with ½ turn (180°) in 1st flight phase – salto fwd or bwd with or without twist in 2nd flight phase.

== Injuries ==
The horse has been blamed for several serious accidents over the years. Diane Ellingson Smith was paralyzed in 1981 when she over-rotated a new vault she was attempting. In 1988, American Julissa Gomez was paralyzed in a vaulting accident; she died from complications from her injuries three years later. In 1990, a junior Colombian gymnast, Claudia Castillo, broke three vertebrae after her feet slipped off the springboard while she was attempting a vault and became quadripalegic. During warmups at the 1998 Goodwill Games, Chinese gymnast Sang Lan fell and suffered paralysis from a cervical-spine injury.

In a series of crashes when the horse's height was set too low at the 2000 Olympics, gymnasts either rammed into the horse's front end, or had bad landings after having problems with their hand placements during push-off.

In 2007, Dutch junior gymnast Imke Glas was seriously injured after a fall on a vault.

A 2021 study suggested that landing scoring criteria for vault in women's gymnastics increased the risk of injury compared to the criteria in men's gymnastics. Both this study and an earlier one from 2015 recommended allowing more flexion at the knees during landing to reduce impact-related injuries.
