= My Deer Friend Nokotan =

Japanese manga series

- First tankōbon volume cover, featuring Noko Shikanoko

しかのこのこのここしたんたん (Shikanoko Nokonoko Koshitantan)
- Genre: Surreal comedy; Slice of life
- Manga
- Written by: Oshioshio
- Published by: Kodansha
- English publisher: NA: Seven Seas Entertainment
- Imprint: Magazine Edge KC (1–4); Sirius KC (5–)
- Magazine: Shōnen Magazine Edge; (November 15, 2019 – October 17, 2023); Magazine Pocket; (December 20, 2023 – present)
- Original run: November 15, 2019 – present
- Volumes: 9
- Anime television series
- Directed by: Masahiko Ohta
- Written by: Takashi Aoshima
- Music by: Yasuhiro Misawa
- Studio: Wit Studio (Note: Animation production assistance (アニメーション制作協力) for all episodes provided by Studio Massket.)
- Licensed by: Remow
- Original network: Tokyo MX, BS NTV, KFB, TV Aichi, SBS, HBC, TSC, NCC, GYT, AT-X
- English network: SEA: Animax Asia
- Original run: July 7, 2024 – September 22, 2024
- Episodes: 12
- icon

My Deer Friend Nokotan (Japanese: しかのこのこのここしたんたん, Hepburn: Shikanoko Nokonoko Koshitantan; lit. 'deer child, brazen, waiting for a chance') is a Japanese manga series written and illustrated by Oshioshio. It began serialization in Kodansha's shōnen manga magazine Shōnen Magazine Edge in November 2019. After the magazine's discontinuation in October 2023, it was transferred to Kodansha's Magazine Pocket manga website in December the same year. An anime television series adaptation produced by Wit Studio aired from July to September 2024.

== Plot ==
Torako Koshi, a second-year at Hino Minami High School, maintains a perfect student image to hide her delinquent past. Her life turns chaotic when she meets Noko Shikanoko, a transfer student who is actually a sika deer / human hybrid form. Reluctantly, Torako becomes Noko's guide to human life and leads the newly-formed Deer Club. Nicknamed "Koshi-tan" by Noko, Torako struggles to balance her model student façade with the club's bizarre and psychotic activities. This unlikely friendship challenges Torako's carefully constructed identity and cripples her sanity, which often leads to comical situations as she navigates school life with a deer-girl in tow.

== Characters ==
=== Deer Club ===
Noko Shikanoko (鹿乃子 のこ, Shikanoko Noko) / Nokotan (のこたん)
Voiced by: Megumi Han (Japanese); Trina Deuhart (English)
The title character of the series, a deer-girl hybrid and transfer student who starts the school's Deer Club. She possesses unusual abilities, such as being able to remove her antlers and use them in various ways. She seems to have the power to influence others around her (except for Torako), as they do not appear to be bothered by her antics. Either way, even though Noko's abilities and life clearly go beyond normal human ones or even violate the laws of reality, it seems that almost no one except Koshi is worried about it. In the final episode of the anime, it is revealed that she came from an organization called the Deer Hole.
Torako Koshi (虎視 虎子, Koshi Torako) / Koshitan (こしたん)
Voiced by: Saki Fujita (Japanese); Roo Ryder (English)
The main protagonist of the series, Torako is the school's Student Council President at her high school and a former mafia delinquent, although she only tried to act tough most of the time. She tries to put on the image of a dignified, ideal honor student. She later becomes the president of the school's Deer Club, started by Noko, where she and her other friends meet after school. Noko's antics prove to be a serious annoyance to Torako on most occasions, almost to the point of driving her insane.
Anko Koshi (虎視 餡子, Koshi Anko) / Koshian (こしあん)
Voiced by: Rui Tanabe (Japanese); Sarah Ruth Thomas (English)
Torako's psychotic younger sister, who is obsessed with her. Torako is often terrified of Anko, but forces herself to pretend as though Anko's behavior does not affect her. Although it is rarely emphasized deeply, some scenes involving her suggest that she has an open incestuous attraction to her sister.
Meme Bashame (馬車芽 めめ, Bashame Meme) / Bashame (ばしゃめ)
Voiced by: Fūka Izumi (Japanese); Bay Doxey (English)
A freshman who claims she wants to become a deer after being given deer crackers from Noko before the opening ceremony of school. Bashame is obsessed with rice and is always seen eating some or planting rice fields. She also wants to become a deer, like Nokotan. She has illeism, referring to herself as "Bashame".

=== Student Council ===
Neko Nekoyamada (猫山田 根子, Nekoyamada Neko) / Nekochan (ねこちゃん)
Voiced by: Yurika Kubo (Japanese); Meagan Johnson (English)
The Vice-President of the school's Student Council. She sees Torako as her arch rival, and attempts to abolish the Deer Club and depose Torako from the Student Council but is never successful. She is very short and frequently carries a step stool.
Kinu Tanukikōji (狸小路 絹, Tanukikōji Kinu) / Tanuki (たぬき)
Voiced by: Rio Tsuchiya (Japanese); Nickolette Kong (English)
The neurotic secretary of the Student Council, who tends to overthink and overreact to issues that affect her.
Chiharu Tsubameya (燕谷 千春, Tsubameya Chiharu) / Tsubame (つばめ)
Voiced by: Chinatsu Akasaki (Japanese); Abby Pasion (English)
The treasurer of the Student Council who seems quiet and aloof, but is secretly a big fan of Nokotan and all things deer.

=== Deer Hole ===
Kyun-chan (キュンちゃん)
A Hokkaido tourism mascot from the Deer Hole. He comes to Hino Minami High School to challenge Noko, but loses to Torako.
Chikamaru-kun and Hana-chan (ちかまる君とはなちゃん)
Two Deer Hole mascots from Ojika, Nagasaki. They come to Hino Minami High School to challenge Noko, but loses to Neko.
Sento-kun (せんとくん)
The Deer Hole's strongest mascot. He is from Nara City. He is the last mascot to challenge Noko and although he wins, both he and Noko are deemed winners.
John Miura (三浦ジョン, Miura John)
A researcher who works for the Deer Hole and serves as the host of the final match between Noko and Sento-kun.

=== Other characters ===
Narrator
Voiced by: Kōsuke Toriumi (Japanese); Donald Guzzi (English)
An unseen narrator who often breaks the fourth wall.
Tsunoda (角田)
Voiced by: Shinya Takahashi (Japanese); Josh Portillo (English)
A deer from the Hino Zoo who sometimes appears in the Deer Club's room.
Yoshiharu Tsubameya (燕谷 善治, Tsubameya Yoshiharu)
Voiced by: Takuya Eguchi (Japanese); Josh Portillo (English)
Chiharu's big brother and the owner and sole barista of the Swallow Cafe. He goes to great extents to try and satisfy his customers.
Ukai (鵜飼)
Voiced by: Kikuko Inoue
Torako and Noko's homeroom teacher, as well as the consultant teacher of the Deer Club. She is very supportive of Noko's antics, much to Torako's frustration and annoyance.
Mitsu Inukai (犬養ミツ, Inukai Mitsu)
Voiced by: Kikuko Inoue (Japanese); Shakyra Dunn (English)
An elderly shrine maiden who hides a demonic side. She is also supportive of Noko.
Tsucchi (つっちー)
A creature that resembles a ball wrapped in flexible antlers, and acts like a domesticated pet to Neko. It was given its name by Chiharu, and is the pet of the Deer Club.
Sōichirō Kumatori
Voiced by: Jiro Saito
An old-fashioned hunter who comes to the school to hunt down Noko, but leaves following a phone call from his wife and is arrested for illegally carrying a gun. He escapes arrest, but finds himself face to face with one of the Murdeerers from the Deer Hole.

== Media ==
=== Manga ===
Written and illustrated by Oshioshio, My Deer Friend Nokotan began serialization in Kodansha's shōnen manga magazine Shōnen Magazine Edge on November 15, 2019. After the final issue of the Shōnen Magazine Edge was published on October 17, 2023, the series was transferred to the Magazine Pocket website on December 20 the same year. The series' chapters have been collected in nine tankōbon volumes as of November 2026. The series is licensed in English by Seven Seas Entertainment.

==== Volumes ====
No.	Original release date	Original ISBN	North American release date	North American ISBN
1	July 17, 2020	978-4-06-520245-6	March 15, 2022	978-1-64827-886-0
1. "Girl Meets Deer"; 2. "Payback"; 3. "Koshitan, the Popular Girl?"; 4. "Hot on the Trail!"; 5. "Koshitan's Discovery!"; 6. "Nokotan's Weakness"; 7. "In the Crosshairs"
2	February 17, 2021	978-4-06-522330-7	July 12, 2022	978-1-63858-318-9
8. "You Call That "Love"?"; 9. "Koshitan is No One's Girl"; 10. "Let's Vogue!"; 11. "Ten Million Views or Die?!"; 12. "A New Year's Shrine Visit"; 13. "A Fight I Can't Lose"
3	February 17, 2022	978-4-06-526851-3	February 28, 2023	978-1-63858-784-2
14. "All's Fair in Love and (Deer) Life"; 15. "Perfect Hospitality!"; 16. "Blame It on Spring..."; 17. "Oh, Deer!!"; 18. "Freshmen Spring Forth"; 19. "With the Deer Club's Future in Mind"
4	February 16, 2023	978-4-06-530787-8	October 17, 2023	978-1-68579-520-7
20. "Caught in the Crosshairs!!"; 21. "Behind Enemy Lines"; 22. "Playing the Part of the Perfect Student!"; 23. "Stay Calm, No Matter What!"; 24. "The More the Merrier(?)"; 25. "The Sports Festival!"
5	May 9, 2024	978-4-06-535574-9	December 31, 2024	979-8-89160-645-6
26. "Sport Festival!! Part 2"; 27. "Come Back! Nokotan!"; 28. "Farm Work!"; 29. "Wake Up!"; 30. "The pursuer and the pursued."; 31. "Studying for the Test!!"
6	July 9, 2024	978-4-06-536165-8	August 5, 2025	979-8-89373-687-8
32. "Outcome of the Showdown"; 33. "His Very First Walk!"; 34. "Dental Clinic!"; 35. "Tanukikoji Kinu's Depression"; 36. "Please Draw"; 37. "May I Divine Your Future?"
7	March 7, 2025	978-4-06-538743-6	February 3, 2026	979-8-89561-921-6
38. "We'll Be in Your Care"; 39. "A Serious Gourmet Challenge!"; 40. "Let's Think About The Deer Club 2"; 41. "I forgot..!!"; 42. "Chiharu Tsubameya's melancholy"; 43. "Sincerity towards the deer"
8	January 8, 2026	978-4-06-542077-5	October 6, 2026	979-8-89863-211-3
44. "Nokotan's Egg"; 45. "It's Alive!!"; 46. "Nokotan and Toshizou"; 47. "What Are Seasons?"; 48. "Rice Harvest Time!"; 49. "What Was It Again?"
9	November 9, 2026	978-4-06-545443-5	—	—

=== Anime ===
An anime television series adaptation was announced in March 2024. It is produced by Wit Studio and directed by Masahiko Ohta, with Takashi Aoshima writing and supervising scripts, Ayumu Tsujimura designing the characters, and Yasuhiro Misawa composing the music. The series aired from July 7 to September 22, 2024, on Tokyo MX and BS Nittele. The opening theme is "Shikairo Days" (シカ色デイズ; lit. 'Deer-Colored Days') performed by Megumi Han, Saki Fujita, Rui Tanabe, and Fūka Izumi as their respective characters in the Deer Club, while the ending theme is "Shika-senbei no Uta" (シカせんべいのうた; lit. 'The Deer Cracker Song') performed by Han and Fujita as their respective characters. Remow licensed the series and announced worldwide streaming on Amazon Prime Video, Anime Onegai, ADN, Crunchyroll, and Tubi.

==== Episodes ====
No.	Title	Directed by (Note: Production staff information is taken from the ending credits of each episode.)	Written by	Storyboarded by	Original release date (Note: Episodes are released on Abema 4 days before their televised airings.)
1	"Girl Meets Deer"; Transliteration: "Gāru Mītsu Shika" (Japanese: ガール・ミーツ・シカ)	Masahiko Ohta	Takashi Aoshima	Masahiko Ohta	July 7, 2024
Torako Koshi is established as a model student, admired by her peers. On her way to school, pondering on her past in juvenile delinquency, she runs into a girl with the antlers of a deer hanging from the power lines. The girl guilts Torako into rescuing her, and claims to be able to pick up on Torako's delinquent past. Later that morning, the same girl violently bursts into Torako's class as a new transfer student and introduces herself as Noko Shikanoko. When Noko teases Torako about being a delinquent and a virgin to the unwanted audience of their classmates and teacher, Torako threatens her into silence. Before going home, Torako visits a dilapidated shed on the school's grounds. There she finds Noko, unfazed and bleeding profusely, having fallen while trying to clean. Torako convinces herself to assist Noko, and the two clear out the shed. When their teacher Ukai stops by, Noko reveals that she had gotten permission to use the premises for an extracurricular Deer Club whereof Torako is made to be president. In the evening, while Torako brushes Noko, another girl stares bitterly from the school's front gate.
2	"Deer Meets Darkness Girl"; Transliteration: "Shika Mītsu Kura Gāru" (Japanese: シカ・ミーツ・暗ガール)	Masahito Otani	Kenji Sugihara	Masahiko Ohta	July 14, 2024
Torako heads to school early in the morning to decorate the new club room. After school, she heads to the club room only to find it vandalized and with Noko as the only witness, assuming she is the vandal. Noko corrects her and airs that another person may be responsible and is targeting her. Noko is lured into a trap, and the culprit reveals herself to be Torako's sister Anko. Anko takes offense to Noko stealing Torako's attention and challenges her to a fight where Noko has to leave the school if Anko wins. Noko agrees, and the two later participate in a game show-styled trivia competition with intimate details about Torako, much to her embarrassment. Frustrated with the close match, Anko attempts to kill Noko with kunai, but trips and accidentally throws one towards Torako. Noko dives in its way and is hit, appearing to have died. Noko gets up and reveals that she was saved by a bundle of deer crackers in her pocket, much to Torako's disbelief. Impressed with Noko saving her beloved sister, Anko yields and the two become friends.
3	"Bashame Enrolls"; Transliteration: "Bashame Nyūgaku" (Japanese: ばしゃめ入学)	Shōgo Arai	Takamitsu Kono	Shōgo Arai	July 21, 2024
Torako finds a deer in the Deer Club and assumes it to be a disguised Noko. She tries many attempts to turn her back, to no avail. However, when Noko suddenly arrives, she informs Torako that the deer, named Tsunoda, is an ordinary deer that escaped from Hino Zoo in search of the club's stash of deer crackers. Afterwards, Tsunoda returns to the zoo. When spring arrives, new students enroll in the school, including Anko. Torako and Noko later find a girl sleeping in front of the Deer Club, who introduces herself as Meme Bashame and wants to be a deer like Noko after being saved from starvation with deer crackers. Meme joins the club. Anko also joins the club and begins expressing jealousy towards Meme, but the misunderstanding is soon cleared up. After seeing the club members lazing around, Torako tries to lay down some rules, which at one point leads Noko to threaten to leave and ruin Torako's reputation if she does not respect her more. Torako ends up brushing Noko, Meme, and Anko while another group of students spies on them from outside.
4	"Deer Club Under Siege"; Transliteration: "Nerawareta Shika-bu" (Japanese: 狙われたシカ部)	Ken Sanuma	Yasunori Yamada	Akira Oguro	July 28, 2024
Torako attends a meeting in the student council room with its members: the scheming Neko Nekoyamada who plans to disband the Deer Club and overthrow Torako as the council's president; the anxious Kinu Tanukikōji; and the stoic Chiharu Tsubameya. Neko has Chiharu talk to Torako in hopes of exposing her weakness, but at the end of the day, Neko forgets to deal with the Deer Club. Torako finds Chiharu in the Deer Club and desperately tries to keep up appearances, but Noko steals Chiharu's attention as Torako unsuccessfully tries to regain it. After Chiharu returns home, it is revealed that she is secretly a big fan of Noko. While Torako is doing an errand with Kinu, they accidentally become locked in the gym storage room. Torako sees Noko through the window, but cannot get her attention as she breaks into a musical number. Fearing that they will never be rescued, Kinu hides in the vaulting box. Miraculously, Noko then opens the door, revealing that she has been secretly growing mushrooms in the vaulting box, and accuses Kinu of trying to steal them after finding her inside. The Deer Club later have a meal alongside Kinu and Chiharu. Meanwhile, Neko is left all alone in the student council room, wondering why the others didn't come.
5	"Dig Up the Dirt!!"; Transliteration: "Aitsu no Yowami o Nigire!!" (Japanese: アイツの弱みをにぎれ!!)	Naoki Horiuchi	Kenji Sugihara	Hidetoshi Namura	August 4, 2024
Torako finds a letter in her locker. She believes it to be a love letter, making Noko jealous; however, it is really a note demanding a challenge. Torako confronts the group of delinquent girls behind the letter, with Noko accompanying her. During the fight, Torako is overwhelmed, but Noko hands her one of her antlers, which explodes, destroying the gym and sending everyone flying. Torako decides to spy on Noko to see if she has a weakness, but only witnesses her doing nothing and eating bananas that she stows inside her antlers. Following her to the zoo, she discovers that Noko lives in the deer exhibit and observes her strange antics with the deer and visitors. After she notices Torako, they spend the day with each other before parting ways. Neko makes an attempt to undermine the Deer Club, but is caught by Noko. Neko initially declines Noko's request to join the club, but quickly changes her mind for espionage purposes. After spending the day at the club, she is unable to find any weaknesses to exploit.
6	"The Summer Deer Festival"; Transliteration: "Natsu no Shika Matsuri" (Japanese: 夏のシカ祭り)	Yuyoshi Aoki	Takashi Aoshima	Takaharu Osumi	August 11, 2024
The episode begins with 18 shorts: Noko tries to bend a spoon, but fails. Noko provides some coffee made in her head to Torako, but the latter quickly declines. Torako goes through bills that she has to pay for the Deer Club, and Noko helps by selling one of her antlers. Noko winks and bends her antlers. While on the computer, Noko finds information on cats and little information on deer. Noko creates a new body pillow and a new T-shirt. Noko approaches Torako dressed like a god and gives her a 'gaming antler'. Torako has trouble drinking her bubble milk tea and finds the straw is actually one of Noko's antlers. Anko shows Torako her new school uniform, which turns out to be Torako's. Noko provides toppings for Meme's rice. Anko and Noko present new antler-based products, which Neko watches. Chiharu buys the antler products and shows them to Kinu, to Neko's shock. Neko wonders what antler-based products will be made in the future. Torako encounters a cat and wind, making Noko and Meme jealous respectively. Anko brings Torako tea and snacks while she is busy with her studies. Tsunoda returns to the club and is greeted by Meme and Noko. The Deer Club starts a band, to Torako's dismay. When summer comes, Torako and Anko talk about Torako's new uniform. At the Deer Club, the group see spots on Noko; Bashame believes she has contracted a disease caused by contaminated rice. Although Noko considers leaving, she quickly returns with Tsunoda, who also has spots, revealing that the two are actually molting (though Noko sheds her "skin", uniform included, instead of her fur, which Meme doesn't hesitate to wear). Neko formulates another plan to take down the Deer Club with a reluctant Chiharu and Kinu, but their meeting is interrupted by Noko, who shows them a wrapped ball-like creature with moving antlers that she found buried in the school grounds. Chiharu names it Tsucchi, and the group discover that it likes to eat chalk. Neko bonds with Tsucchi just as Torako arrives.
7	"DeerColle, Streaming, Hospitality, and Such"; Transliteration: "Shikakore Toka Haishin Toka Omotenashi Toka" (Japanese: シカコレとか配信とかおもてなしとか)	Marina Maki	Takamitsu Kono	Hiroaki Shimura	August 18, 2024
While visiting the Deer Club, Noko receives a message from a deer. She announces to the rest of the club members of her plan to enter an event called Deer Collection 2024, or DeerColle for short, which is a competition involving deer. Torako doesn't want to take part, but learns that the other members have already signed her up for it and that the prizes that they win are fortunate, making her reconsider. However, she and Noko must have a strong bond in order to win, so Torako starts training and ends up embarrassing herself when Ukai walks in on her performing. The winners are then revealed to be Tsunuyoma from Nara Park and Mr. Tanabe; it remains unclear whether Noko and Torako even attended. While Torako is alone with Noko, she begins streaming the Deer Club's activities per a suggestion from Ukai, though Noko complicates things. The video of Noko and Torako's antics proves to be an embarrassment to the latter, especially when she discovers that Anko and Meme had watched the whole stream. The archive of the stream later goes viral. Café owner Yoshiharu Tsubameya, Chiharu's older brother, is busy working just as Torako and Noko arrive. Yoshiharu is surprised by Noko's appearance, but also recalls her sister buying deer-related merchandise earlier. He nevertheless provides them with a table. Noko's unusual behavior and tastes make things difficult for Yoshiharu and he ends up failing to provide proper hospitality for Noko, but Noko convinces him otherwise. In turn, he decides to be prepared for their next visit.
8	"Deer After Deer"; Transliteration: "Yuku Shika, Kuru Shika" (Japanese: ゆくシカ、くるシカ)	Ken Sanuma	Yasunori Yamada	Ken Sanuma	August 25, 2024
At the Deer Shrine of Hino, Torako, Anko, and Meme are waiting for Noko, but decide to go without her when she doesn't show up. Upon attending the ceremony, Torako is shocked to see that Noko is taking part of it as the Deer Goddess, but no one else notices and Noko herself denies being Noko. Torako then meets an elderly shrine maiden named Mitsu Inukai, who scolds her when she speaks up. After selecting a fortune, Torako is surprised at its deer theming. As Torako confronts Noko over her actions, she serves Torako a bowl of antler soup as an antler-burning ritual begins, causing Noko to glow. After the ceremony ends, Torako is left traumatized just as Noko arrives in her school uniform and does not recall the recent events at the shrine, but Torako sees through her bluff after she shares antler soup with them. When the New Year comes, Noko and Torako begin an introduction for the second story. At the Deer Club, Noko, Torako, and Anko are busy playing a deer-themed Game of Life. Fantasy scenes occur throughout the characters' turns that show them with antlers and the board game shown realistically. Torako becomes confused and shocked by the game's events, but nevertheless enjoys it. Meme begins choking on mochi, but recovers after being touched by one of Noko's enlarged moose antlers.
9	"Get the Sports Festival Done!"; Transliteration: "Taiikusai wo Yaritogero!" (Japanese: 体育祭をやり遂げろ!)	Yurika Tsushima	Kenji Sugihara	Akira Oguro	September 1, 2024
Come spring, Torako has already made plans for the sports festival when Neko and several other students arrive the day before and inform her of various emergencies. Being too much work for her, she requests the rest of the Deer Club to help. After dealing with these problems, the Sports Festival begins, but Noko's antics prove to be a bother to Torako. During the first race, Yoshiharu struggles with the obstacles, which involve eating both edible and inedible items. Mitsu ends up winning. Torako takes part in the next event, which is antler bomb defusal, resulting in multiple craters in the field that the students have to fill. The fourth event involves the Deer Club, with Noko bringing deer from the zoo onto the field to Torako's dismay. The fifth event involves a tug of war using Noko's antlers as the rope. Noko is deemed the winner of the event, upsetting Torako. The sixth event involves tossing balls into baskets, but Torako's repeated mental exhaustion sets in, and Neko rushes to Tsucchi's rescue after it gets caught in the middle of the event. The last event is put on hold due to the deer occupying the field, but Torako is able to get them to move using Noko's deer crackers before letting her anger out on Noko for her antics, revealing her true colors in front of the whole school in the process. However, they continue to accept her regardless. The festival eventually ends three hours behind schedule.
10	"Blame it on the Spring"; Transliteration: "Zenbu, Haru no Sei..." (Japanese: 全部、春のせい…)	Shōgo Arai	Yasunori Yamada	Shōgo Arai	September 8, 2024
Following the end of the festival, spring arrives. At the Deer Club, Torako finds Noko crying, but not upset. Noko is also experiencing a rash, leading Torako to deduct that she has hay fever. Neko hopes to use this opportunity to shut down the Deer Club, but gets hay fever as well. Noko considers shutting down the club due to the outbreak, but Torako tries to help her, with little success. The deer from Hino Zoo arrive to encourage her and she gets the idea to destroy the cedar trees causing the hay fever, which Neko agrees with. Torako has Noko and Neko visit an animal hospital, but ends up getting hay fever too. Sometime later, Noko has stopped visiting the Deer Club. Torako decides to find her and discovers that she has become an instructor for a flower arranging club. Noko shows off an arrangement using her antlers and head along with a deer cracker. She then judges the other members of the club and plays a guitar to make some wild flowers move. After the club ends, Noko announces that she is leaving, to the dismay of the club members. The next day, Noko returns to the Deer Club as they continue their activities. Tsucchi helps Meme plant rice crops, but it becomes a competition between the two. After they finish, they have a snack with Anko as they decide to have a party in the future.
11	"The Pursuer and the Pursued"	Ito Zenichiro & Jirou Arimoto	Takamitsu Kono	Hiroaki Shimura	September 15, 2024
Torako is disturbed by Noko producing bubbles from her antlers while sleeping, which also attracts birds. Torako unsuccessfully tries to wake her up while everyone else is surprisingly not bothered, although she does wake up at one point to answer a question. A hunter arrives at the school, and Noko disappears. The hunter comes in and introduces himself as Souichirou Kumatori, who is searching for Noko. After he leaves, Noko comes out of hiding and explains why Kumatori is after her. Kumatori continues his search for Noko throughout the school day. The search continues until midnight, where Noko manages to escape a trap set up by Kumatori. The next morning, the two prepare to face each other on the roof with Torako watching. Noko converts her antlers into a lightsaber-like weapon while Kumatori brandishes a rifle. Before the fight can start, Kumatori is interrupted by a call from his wife and is forced to leave; however, he is arrested by the police after forgetting to put his gun back in its case. Noko wears a torn-up tracksuit while her school uniform is being washed. While going shopping with Torako, Noko reveals that she has a fear of plastic water bottles. Torako decides to take a detour, but they end up back where they started. Returning to the Deer Club, Torako patches up the tracksuit, only for Noko to rip it again. In a post-credits scene, while going to school, Torako notices that Noko has mysteriously disappeared and no one other than her remembers Noko.
12	"Farewell Nokotan!? Long Live the Deer Club!"; Transliteration: "Saraba Nokotan!? Shika-bu yo Eien ni" (Japanese: さらばのこたん!? シカ部よ永遠に)	Masahiko Ohta	Takashi Aoshima	Masahiko Ohta	September 22, 2024
As Noko's memory slowly fades back into reality, she is able to interact with other people again, which retcons the previous episode's cliffhanger. Noko explains that she came from an organization of mascots called the Deer Hole, but fled because she got tired of the events; the anime's broadcasting has revealed her location to the Deer Hole's other mascot members. A contest is held using the same stage from the second episode; should Noko lose, she will be forced to return to the Deer Hole. After the Deer Club wins, they learn that the strongest mascot, Sento-kun, is on his way. The Deer Club help train Noko for the final challenge, which takes place in a wresting arena. Sento-kun defeats Noko in every round, but they are both declared winners on the basis that participation alone takes courage and is a victory in its own right. As a result, Noko is allowed to stay in the Deer Club. The episode ends with an original song in place of the usual outro.

== Reception ==
=== Anime ===
Although the work was relatively little known outside of Japan before the anime adaptation, after the show's premiere, first the anime and then the manga went viral and acquired a memetic reputation. In particular, the anime's title trended on TikTok and won several "buzzword" awards due to its rhythmic repetition in the show's opening theme. While the original story initially had some potential of this as a gag comedy, the staff of the anime adaptation admitted to being shocked by the speed of development and the scale of its popularity.

Year	Award	Category	Recipient	Result	Ref.
2024	TikTok Trend Awards	Hot Word	Shikanoko Nokonoko Koshitantan	Won	
2024	TikTok Awards Japan	Anime of the Year	My Deer Friend Nokotan	Nominated	
2024	Anime Buzzword Awards	Silver Prize	Shikanoko Nokonoko Koshitantan	Won	
2024	Abema Anime Trend Awards	Anime Marketing Award	My Deer Friend Nokotan	Won	
2025	Reiwa Anisong Awards	Character Song Award	"Shikairo Days" by Deer Club (Megumi Han, Saki Fujita, Rui Tanabe, and Fūka Izumi)	Nominated	
2025	Reiwa Anisong Awards	Project Award	"Shikairo Days" by Deer Club (Megumi Han, Saki Fujita, Rui Tanabe, and Fūka Izumi)	Won	
2025	Reiwa Anisong Awards	Anikara Award	"Shikairo Days" by Deer Club (Megumi Han, Saki Fujita, Rui Tanabe, and Fūka Izumi)	Nominated	
2025	AT-X	Top Anime Ranking	My Deer Friend Nokotan	14th place	
2025	11th Anime Trending Awards	Opening Theme Song of the Year	"Shikairo Days" by Deer Club (Megumi Han, Saki Fujita, Rui Tanabe, and Fūka Izumi)	Nominated	
2025	11th Anime Trending Awards	Best Voice Acting Performance – Female	Saki Fujita as Torako Koshi	Nominated	
2025	9th Crunchyroll Anime Awards	Best Comedy	My Deer Friend Nokotan	Nominated	
2025	9th Crunchyroll Anime Awards	Best Slice of Life	My Deer Friend Nokotan	Nominated	
2025	Japan Expo Awards	Daruma for Best Slice of Life	My Deer Friend Nokotan	Nominated	
2025	47th Anime Grand Prix	Best Theme Song	"Shikairo Days" by Deer Club (Megumi Han, Saki Fujita, Rui Tanabe, and Fūka Izumi)	6th place	

== See also ==
- Angry Beavers - another animated surreal comedy that plays on "scientific" facts about animals.
