= Sang Lan =

Chinese gymnast

- 桑兰
- Born: 11 June 1981 (age 45) Ningbo, Zhejiang, China

Gymnastics career
- Discipline: Women's artistic gymnastics
- Country represented: China

Sang Lan (simplified Chinese: 桑兰; traditional Chinese: 桑蘭; pinyin: Sāng Lán; born 11 June 1981) is a Chinese former artistic gymnast. After being paralyzed in an accident, she became a television personality and advocate for the disabled.

== Early life ==
Sang was born in Ningbo; her father worked in housing management, and her mother worked in a steel factory. She began gymnastics at age six. At age 8, she was selected by a sports school away from home, after which she rarely saw her parents, who later expressed regret over not spending more time with her.

== Athletic career and injury ==
Sang joined the Zhejiang provincial team in 1990, and she won the all-around and every single event final at the 1991 Zhejiang Province Championships. Hampered by a serious leg injury, she did not join the national team until the end of 1993.

Though she struggled on some events, she became one of China's strongest vaulters, winning the national vault title. She retired in 1997 due to chronic injuries and the fact that despite her vaulting ability, she would not be selected for major international competition without stronger scores on the other apparatuses. Soon after, she was asked to join the national team again in hopes she could compete at the upcoming 1999 World Championships, held in Tianjin, and the 2000 Summer Olympics. She agreed to do so.

While she never represented China at the Olympics or World Gymnastics Championships, she did compete at the 1996 American Cup, and she was selected for the 1998 Goodwill Games team.

In New York City at the Goodwill Games in July 1998, during warm-ups for the vault event final, Sang fell while she was performing a timer (a simple vault, used by the athlete to familiarize herself with the apparatus and warm up). She could not raise herself from the mat and was taken to Nassau University Medical Center (NUMC), a Level I trauma center in East Meadow. She underwent spinal realignment, and cervical spine fusion, and she regained some movement. However, she had several fractures and dislocations of her cervical vertebrae, and the injury to her spinal cord was extensive, and she was paralysed from the mid-chest down. She received an experimental drug treatment to try to repair her nerves.

Sang remained in New York City for almost a year, receiving rehabilitation at Mount Sinai Hospital. Many celebrities, including Leonardo DiCaprio, Jimmy Carter, Celine Dion and Christopher Reeve visited and offered their support; she was also invited to participate in the New Year's Eve festivities in Times Square as an honored guest. She received a number of donations from her hometown, and the organizing committee of the Goodwill Games covered the expenses of her parents while they stayed with her. Event insurance covered all of her medical expenses while she was in the US.

In 2008, Sang said that her fall was caused by a coach moving the springboard, intending to help her. In 2011, she instead stated that a Romanian coach had moved a mat while she was mid-air, distracting her. She sued several insurance companies and Time Warner Cable, the owner of the event, accusing them of allowing a dangerous number of people near the vault and for failing to provide for her after 1999 as they had publicly stated they would do. She also sued the Liu couple who acted as her guardians during her recovery, who she accused of silencing, controlling, and defaming her; she additionally filed a police report accusing two members of the Liu family of sexually assaulting her. In June, her sexual assault case was dismissed due to lack of jurisdiction, and in July, she and the insurance companies reached a settlement.

== Advocacy ==
Since returning to China, Sang has become a celebrity and a disability advocate. A television miniseries about her life was produced in the late 1990s; she was portrayed by her former gymnastics teammate Mo Huilan. Sang also held her own show, Sang Lan Olympics 2008 on STAR TV, a Mandarin-language television channel. She was an ambassador for Beijing's successful 2008 Olympics bid and was selected as an Olympic relay torchbearer.

Sang graduated from Peking University in 2007. She has continued a rigorous physical therapy regimen and has regained some use of her arms and hands. She hoped to represent China as a table tennis player at the 2008 Summer Paralympics after watching a player with no hands compete.

== Personal life ==
In 2013, Sang married Huang Jian, a former fencer in the Chinese national team. The couple have a son, born a year later.

== Competitive history ==
Year	Event	Team	AA	VT	UB	BB	FX
1995	Chinese Championships			2nd place, silver medalist(s)			
1995	USA-BLR-CHN Tri-Meet		11				
1996	McDonald's American Cup		7				
1996	Chinese Championships			2nd place, silver medalist(s)			
1996	International Mixed Pairs	11					
1997	Chinese Championships			1st place, gold medalist(s)			
1998	Chinese Championships			2nd place, silver medalist(s)			
1998	International Team Championships	3rd place, bronze medalist(s)	17				
