= Soul Buster =

Chinese manhua and animation series

ch: 侍灵演武 jp: ソウルバスター
- Manhua
- Author: Bai Mao
- Published by: Posts & Telecom Press
- Magazine: Shangman
- Original run: May 2012 – present
- Volumes: 3 (locally)
- Anime television series
- Directed by: Kōbun Shizuno (Chief); Toshinori Watanabe
- Written by: Masaya Watanabe
- Music by: Akiyuki Tateyama
- Studio: Studio Pierrot
- Original network: Tokyo MX, BS11, MBS
- Original run: October 4, 2016 – December 11, 2016
- Episodes: 12

Soul Buster is a Chinese manhua written and illustrated by Bai Mao and based on the 14th century novel Romance of the Three Kingdoms by Luo Guanzhong. A Japanese-Chinese animated series adaptation by Studio Pierrot and co-produced with Youku Tudou which aired from October 4 to December 11, 2016.

== Characters ==
- Son Shin

Voiced by: Takahiro Mizushima

- Zhou Yu

Voiced by: Rui Tanabe

- Ryō Un

Voiced by: Seira Ryū

- Barin Yi

Voiced by: Tetsuya Kakihara

- Shuijing

Voiced by: Yuko Sanpei

- Zhang

Voiced by: Tarusuke Shingaki

- Emperor Xian of Han

Voiced by: Tomohiro Nishimura

- Wei Yan

Voiced by: Kenichirou Matsuda

- Zhou Cang

Voiced by: Toshiyuki Toyonaga

- Cao Xing

Voiced by: Shun Horie

- Feng Ya

Voiced by: Ami Koshimizu

- Bo Anzi

Voiced by: Daisuke Namikawa

- Cheng Pu

Voiced by: Takayuki Sugo

- School nurse

Voiced by: Mari Hino
