= Tokuryū =

Loosely organized criminal group in Japan

Tokuryū (匿流) is a term coined by Japan's National Police Agency (NPA) to describe a new and growing form of loosely organized criminal groups that have emerged as an alternative to traditional yakuza organizations. The term combines the Japanese words tokumei (匿名, anonymous) and ryūdo (流動, fluid), reflecting the groups' absence of hierarchy and their flexible, anonymous operations.

These groups have gained prominence in recent years due to crackdowns that disrupted Japan's otherwise hierarchical crime syndicates. Unlike the yakuza, which follow strict codes of conduct and maintain hierarchical organizations, tokuryū are decentralized and rely heavily on digital communication to recruit members and coordinate operations.

== History ==
Japanese and Filipino law enforcement agencies worked together to dismantle the Luffy gang behind the Luffy robberies from 2022 to 2023.

In August 2025, the National Police Agency plans to use generative AI to identify leaders of various tokuryu gangs while collaborating with foreign police forces overseas.

On June 1, 2025, the TMPD announced the creation of the Tokuryu countermeasures headquarters, tasked to investigate and arrest anyone involved in tokuryu operations. It would be allow to operate even outside its jurisdiction.

In November 2025, an assistant inspector in the Tokyo Metropolitan Police Department (TMPD) was arrested for acting as a mole on behalf of Natural, which is considered as a Tokuryū group.

On August 6, 2026, the NPA is considering to implement a new investigation method that involves remotely analyzing communication apps used by tokuryu gangs.

== Characteristics ==
=== Structure and organization ===
Tokuryū groups operate without a centralized structure or formal leadership, making them distinct from traditional yakuza syndicates. Members often do not know one another personally and are recruited for specific tasks or crimes. This lack of connection between members complicates investigations and makes these groups more elusive.

=== Recruitment ===
These groups typically recruit online through social media and encrypted messaging apps. Many recruits are young, including students, part-time workers and unemployed, lured by the promise of high earnings through what are often marketed as yami-baito (闇バイト, dark part-time jobs). These jobs often lead participants into criminal activities.

=== Criminal activities ===
Tokuryū groups are involved in a wide range of illegal activities, including:

- Fraud: Scams such as impersonation fraud and phishing, often targeting vulnerable populations like the elderly.
- Drug trafficking: Smuggling and distributing illegal substances.
- Illegal fishing:
- Robberies and thefts: Coordinated smash-and-grab robberies, particularly targeting high-value items which include vehicles.
- Murder and assault: High-profile cases, such as contract killings, have also been linked to tokuryū.
- Ancillary offenses: Facilitating illegal activities by creating fake documents, operating underground banks, or organizing sham marriages.
