= Ai Tenchi Muyo! =

Japanese anime television series

愛・天地無用! (Ai Tenchi Muyō!)
- Genre: Comedy, harem
- Anime television series
- Directed by: Hiroshi Negishi
- Written by: Hiroshi Negishi; Junpei Yoshihara
- Music by: Yoshihisa Hirano
- Studio: AIC Plus+
- Licensed by: NA: Crunchyroll
- Original network: Tokyo MX
- Original run: October 6, 2014 – December 26, 2014
- Episodes: 50 + 10 recaps
- Manga
- Written by: Haruna Nakazato
- Published by: Kodansha
- Magazine: Monthly Shōnen Sirius
- Original run: November 26, 2014 – October 26, 2015
- Related series
- 1. Tenchi Muyo! Ryo-Ohki; 2. Tenchi Universe; 3. Tenchi in Tokyo; 4. Tenchi Muyo! GXP; 5. Tenchi Muyo! War on Geminar

Ai Tenchi Muyo! (愛・天地無用！) is a Japanese anime series produced by AIC. The series is the 6th installment of the Tenchi Muyo! franchise and is sponsored by the city of Takahashi, Okayama in order to promote tourism for the city, and several new characters are based upon the legend of Momotarō and his companions. It was also created to commemorate the franchise's 20th anniversary and a revival project. The anime series aired on Tokyo MX beginning in October 2014, and consisted of 60 four-minute episodes. The series was directed by Hiroshi Negishi, who previously directed Tenchi Universe and its two sequel films (Tenchi Muyo in Love and Tenchi Forever!), with Suzuhito Yasuda providing the new, updated character designs. Many of the voice actors from the original franchise returned, with the exception of Ayeka, who is now played by Haruhi Nanao. Negishi has stated that the plot is adapted from an unproduced sequel to Tenchi Forever!, though the absence of the character Kiyone Makibi makes continuity with Tenchi Universe dubious.

== Plot ==
In this story, the world is in chaos, thanks to Washu. Now in order to save it, Tenchi Masaki must go undercover as a student teacher at an all-girls school. Unfortunately for him, trouble always comes his way as he has a hard time dealing with the hijinks of his new students.

== Characters ==
=== Masaki Household ===
Tenchi Masaki (柾木 天地)
Voiced by: Masami Kikuchi (Japanese); Matt K. Miller (English)
Now 22 years old, Tenchi is assigned as a student teacher in an all-girls school for a secret mission.
Ryoko (魎呼)
Voiced by: Ai Orikasa (Japanese); Petrea Burchard (English)
A former space pirate, she reformed upon meeting Tenchi and the others and moved to his house.
Ayeka (阿重霞)
Voiced by: Haruhi Nanao (Japanese); Cherami Leigh (English)
A princess of the Jurai Royal Family, usually competes with Ryoko for Tenchi's attention.
Sasami (砂沙美)
Voiced by: Chisa Yokoyama (Japanese); Sherry Lynn (English)
Now a teenager, Sasami is also a princess of Jurai and Ayeka's younger sister.
Mihoshi (美星)
Voiced by: Yūko Mizutani (Japanese); Rebecca Forstadt (English)
A detective of the Galaxy Police, Mihoshi is prone to clumsiness and can act ditsy, despite being highly intelligent.
Washu (鷲羽)
Voiced by: Yuko Kobayashi (Japanese); Karen Strassman (English)
A former director of the Galaxy Academy and ranked as the top scientist in the universe. She is the one who asks Tenchi to infiltrate the school.

=== Student Council ===
Momo Kawanagare (川流 もも)
Voiced by: Nao Tōyama (Japanese); Julie Maddalena (English)
The main female protagonist and the school's student council president. She is straight-forward and honest and has a strong sense of justice. Unbeknownst to her (currently), she is a temporally-displaced princess of the Jurai Royal Family.
Hachiko (ハチ子)
Voiced by: Kana Yūki (Japanese); Mona Marshall (English)
The student council's enforcer. She's chivalrous, spirited, and fundamentally brave. She's overprotective of Momo and to her anyone who gets close to Momo is an enemy. She is brave and strong while fighting with her wooden sword, but cries in despair upon losing it.
Hana Saryu (沙流 葉七)
Voiced by: M.A.O (Japanese); Dorothy Elias-Fahn (English)
The student council's accountant. Contrary to her outward flirtatiousness, she's an aikido master and Yuri enthusiast. She has a broad outlook and is good at reading the atmosphere.
Tōri Fueyama (笛山 塔里)
Voiced by: Ai Fukada (Japanese); Laura Post (English)
The student council's clerk. She's brilliant and keeps her calm no matter what the situation is, except for her infatuation with Sasami. Her grades are number one in the school.

=== Science Club ===
Yuki Fuka (布賀 油木)
Voiced by: Azusa Satou (Japanese); Brianne Brozey (English)
The club president of the science club. She's quick-tempered and unyielding. She searches for treasure around the school for an unknown party, leading them to butt heads with the student council over securing resources with which to do it.
Rui Aoi (藍井 涙)
Voiced by: Rui Tanabe (Japanese); Stephanie Sheh (English)
A shy and weak member of the science club. She's tall, well endowed, and a big eater. She and Yuki are childhood friends and are therefore, unfortunately for Rui, often together.
Beni Kinojō (鬼ノ城 紅)
Voiced by: Yō Taichi (Japanese); Cindy Robinson (English)
The bodyguard of the school science club. She's taciturn, brave, and confident. She has superhuman strength like an ogre. She is suspicious of Tenchi and think he is hiding a secret.

=== Other characters ===
Ukan Kurihara (栗原 有漢)
Voiced by: Ayako Kawasumi (Japanese); Melora Harte (English)
Tenchi's mentor as a teacher, who offers him guidance. It is revealed later that she works for the Galaxy Police.

== Media ==
=== Anime ===
No.	Title	Original release date
1	"Tenchi's Arrival" (Tenchi Appears); Transliteration: "Tenchi Tōjō" (Japanese: 天地登場)	October 6, 2014
2	"School Tour" (School Guide); Transliteration: "Gakkō An'nai" (Japanese: 学校案内)	October 7, 2014
3	"Tenchi's Journey Begins" (Tenchi's Departure); Transliteration: "Tenchi Shuppatsu" (Japanese: 天地出発)	October 8, 2014
4	"Underground Unrest" (Underground Unrest); Transliteration: "Chika Fuon" (Japanese: 地下不穏)	October 9, 2014
5	"Looking Back Part 1" (Looking Back) (1); Transliteration: "Furikaeri (1)" (Japanese: 振り返り (1))	October 10, 2014
A summary of episodes 1 to 4
6	"Seeking Life in Death" (Searching While Dead); Transliteration: "Shichūkyūkatsu" (Japanese: 死中求活)	October 13, 2014
7	"Survived the First Day" (Survive the First Day); Transliteration: "Shonichi Seikan" (Japanese: 初日生還)	October 14, 2014
8	"Tenchi Encounter" (Tenchi Encounter); Transliteration: "Tenchi Sōgū" (Japanese: 天地遭遇)	October 15, 2014
9	"Festival Preparation" (Pre-festival Preparations); Transliteration: "Matsuri Maejunbi" (Japanese: 祭前準備)	October 16, 2014
10	"Looking Back Part 2" (Looking Back) (2); Transliteration: "Furikaeri (2)" (Japanese: 振り返り (2))	October 17, 2014
A summary of episodes 6 to 9
11	"Dungeon Conquer" (Conquering the Dungeon); Transliteration: "Meikyū Tōha" (Japanese: 迷宮踏破)	October 20, 2014
12	"Friend and Foe Stuck in the Same Boat" (Enemies in the Same Boat); Transliteration: "Goetsudōshū" (Japanese: 呉越同舟)	October 21, 2014
13	"Cutting the Gordian Knot" (Cutting a Tangled Knot); Transliteration: "Kaitōranma" (Japanese: 快刀乱麻)	October 22, 2014
14	"Delicious Trouble" (Delicious Slip of the Tongue); Transliteration: "Bimi Zekka" (Japanese: 美味舌禍)	October 23, 2014
15	"Looking Back Part 3" (Looking Back) (3); Transliteration: "Furikaeri (3)" (Japanese: 振り返り (3))	October 24, 2014
A summary of episodes 11 to 14
16	"Tenchi Arrives" (Tenchi's Arrival); Transliteration: "Tenchi Tōtatsu" (Japanese: 天地到達)	October 27, 2014
17	"Festival Opening" (Festival Opening); Transliteration: "Saiten Kaimaku" (Japanese: 祭典開幕)	October 28, 2014
18	"Tenchi's Kiss" (Tenchi's Kiss); Transliteration: "Tenchi Seppun" (Japanese: 天地接吻)	October 29, 2014
19	"Tenchi's Transformation" (Tenchi's Transformation); Transliteration: "Tenchi Hensei" (Japanese: 天地変成)	October 30, 2014
20	"Looking Back Part 4" (Looking Back) (4); Transliteration: "Furikaeri (4)" (Japanese: 振り返り (4))	October 31, 2014
A summary of episodes 16 to 19
21	"Beautiful Feast" (Beautiful Feast); Transliteration: "Birei Kyōen" (Japanese: 美麗饗宴)	November 3, 2014
22	"Storm Before Interlude" (Intermission Before the Storm); Transliteration: "Arashi Zen Makuai" (Japanese: 嵐前幕間)	November 4, 2014
23	"Opening Declaration" (Opening Declaration); Transliteration: "Kaikai Sengen" (Japanese: 開会宣言)	November 5, 2014
24	"Obstacle Course" (Steeplechase); Transliteration: "Shōgai Kyōsō" (Japanese: 障害競走)	November 6, 2014
25	"Looking Back Part 5" (Looking Back) (5); Transliteration: "Furikaeri (5)" (Japanese: 振り返り (5))	November 7, 2014
A summary of episodes 21 to 24
26	"The Great Mock Calvalry Battle" (Great Mock Cavalry Battle); Transliteration: "Dai Gibasen" (Japanese: 大騎馬戦)	November 10, 2014
27	"Lovely Sumo Butts" (Lovely Back-to-Back Sumo); Transliteration: "Bi Shirizumou" (Japanese: 美尻相撲)	November 11, 2014
28	"Super Playoffs" (Super Overtime); Transliteration: "Chō Enchō-sen" (Japanese: 超延長戦)	November 12, 2014
29	"Dorm Supervisor Inauguration" (Dormitory Supervisor Inauguration); Transliteration: "Ryōkan Shūnin" (Japanese: 寮監就任)	November 13, 2014
30	"Looking Back Part 6" (Looking Back) (6); Transliteration: "Furikaeri (6)" (Japanese: 振り返り (6))	November 14, 2014
A summary of episodes 26 to 29
31	"Hazy Shadows" (Steam Shadows); Transliteration: "Yukemuri In'nei" (Japanese: 湯煙陰影)	November 17, 2014
32	"No Need for a Midnight Snack" (No Need for a Midnight Snack); Transliteration: "Yashoku Muyō" (Japanese: 夜食無用)	November 18, 2014
33	"Tenchi in Action!" (Tenchi in Action); Transliteration: "Tenchi Jikkō" (Japanese: 天地実行)	November 19, 2014
34	"Meeting on the Roof" (One Meeting on the Roof); Transliteration: "Yane Ichigū" (Japanese: 屋根一遇)	November 20, 2014
35	"Looking Back Part 7" (Looking Back) (7); Transliteration: "Furikaeri (7)" (Japanese: 振り返り (7))	November 21, 2014
A summary of episodes 31 to 34
36	"Backyard Dorm Barbeque" (Barbecue in the Dormitory Garden); Transliteration: "Ryō Niwa Yakiniku" (Japanese: 寮庭焼肉)	November 24, 2014
Tenchi's friends hold a barbecue with the Student Council and invite the Science Club to party with them as well.
37	"Where Tenchi's Mission Began" (When Tenchi's Season Began); Transliteration: "Tenchi Kaimaku" (Japanese: 天地開幕)	November 25, 2014
The event that leads to the start of this series and how Tenchi became a teacher trainee.
38	"Tenchi's Abduction" (Tenchi's Abduction); Transliteration: "Tenchi Rachi" (Japanese: 天地拉致)	November 26, 2014
The Science Club asks for Tenchi and his friends help looking for the treasure that they are so eager to find.
39	"Abnormal Traces" (Abnormal Traces); Transliteration: "Ijō Konseki" (Japanese: 異常痕跡)	November 27, 2014
Upon meeting Mihoshi, Tenchi and the others learn more about the current situation, but certain that they were abducted by the Science Club, the Student Council launches an attack to rescue them.
40	"Looking Back Part 8" (Looking Back) (8); Transliteration: "Furikaeri (8)" (Japanese: 振り返り (8))	November 28, 2014
A summary of episodes 36 to 39
41	"Fierce Fight in the Ruins" (Fierce Fight in the Ruins); Transliteration: "Haikyō Gekitō" (Japanese: 廃墟激闘)	December 1, 2014
Ryoko and Ayeka confront the Student Council while the rest of the gang help the Science Club look for the treasure they are seeking.
42	"Make a Choice" (Making a Choice); Transliteration: "Shushasentaku" (Japanese: 取捨選択)	December 2, 2014
Upon finding the treasure, Tenchi discovers that not only it, but Momo and Beni as well are somehow connected to his mission.
43	"Bringing about the Storm" (Bringing about Winds and Clouds); Transliteration: "Fūun Shōrai" (Japanese: 風雲招来)	December 3, 2014
44	"Declaration of War" (Declaration of War); Transliteration: "Sensen Fukoku" (Japanese: 宣戦布告)	December 4, 2014
45	"Looking Back Part 9" (Looking Back) (9); Transliteration: "Furikaeri (9)" (Japanese: 振り返り (9))	December 5, 2014
A summary of episodes 41 to 44
46	"A Case of Corruption" (Corruption Case); Transliteration: "Oshoku Jiken" (Japanese: 汚職事件)	December 8, 2014
47	"Investigation of Seized Assets" (Seizure Investigation); Transliteration: "Ōshū Sōsa" (Japanese: 押収捜査)	December 9, 2014
48	"Scandal Coverage" (Scandal Reporting); Transliteration: "Shūbun Hōdō" (Japanese: 醜聞報道)	December 10, 2014
49	"Showdown at the Summit" (Showdown at the Summit); Transliteration: "Chōjō Kessen" (Japanese: 頂上決戦)	December 11, 2014
50	"Looking Back Part 10" (Looking Back) (10); Transliteration: "Furikaeri (10)" (Japanese: 振り返り (10))	December 12, 2014
A summary of episodes 46 to 49
51	"A Collapse of Faith" (Bankruptcy of Faith); Transliteration: "Shingi Hatan" (Japanese: 信義破綻)	December 15, 2014
52	"Arrival of the Space Menace" (Demons Descend); Transliteration: "Tenma Kōrin" (Japanese: 天魔降臨)	December 16, 2014
53	"Conflict at the Ruins" (Battle at the Ruins); Transliteration: "Haikyo Kōbō" (Japanese: 廃墟攻防)	December 17, 2014
54	"Wild Sweeping Hit" (A Powerful Blow); Transliteration: "Ōsutoria-da Issen" (Japanese: 豪打一閃)	December 18, 2014
55	"Fateful Encounter" (Fateful Encounter); Transliteration: "Inga Sōgū" (Japanese: 因果遭遇)	December 19, 2014
56	"Wandering in the Dark" (In the Fog); Transliteration: "Gorimuchū" (Japanese: 五里霧中)	December 22, 2014
57	"Torn Asunder" (Torn Asunder); Transliteration: "Shibungoretsu" (Japanese: 四分五裂)	December 23, 2014
58	"Time and Time Again" (Time and Time Again); Transliteration: "Saisansaishi" (Japanese: 再三再四)	December 24, 2014
59	"One and Only" (One and Only); Transliteration: "Yuiitsu Muni" (Japanese: 唯一無二)	December 25, 2014
60	"Once in a Lifetime Encounter" (One in a Lifetime Encounter); Transliteration: "Ichigoichie" (Japanese: 一期一会)	December 26, 2014

=== Manga ===
A manga adaptation, written and illustrated by Haruna Nakazato, debuted in Kodansha's Monthly Shōnen Sirius on November 26, 2014, and ran until October 26, 2015.
