= Rui Tanabe =

Japanese voice actress

- 田辺 留依
- Born: May 23, 1997 (age 29); Tokyo, Japan
- Occupation: Voice actress
- Years active: 2013–present
- Agent: Stay Luck
- Height: 154 cm (5 ft 1 in)

Rui Tanabe (田辺 留依, Tanabe Rui; born May 23, 1997) is a Japanese voice actress. Her voice is featured in several anime series, including as Anko Koshi in My Deer Friend Nokotan, Cecil in Wizard Barristers: Benmashi Cecil, Nanana in Nanana's Buried Treasure, and Zhou Yu in Soul Buster. She also voices Rui Aoi in Ai Tenchi Muyo!, Ai Nishimura in One Week Friends, Mafuyu Asahina in Project Sekai, and Kayoko in High School Fleet.

== Filmography ==
=== Anime ===
List of voice performances in anime
Year	Title	Role	Notes	Source
2012	Polar Bear Café	Porcupine fan club		
2013	Kin-iro Mosaic	Girl, Female student		
2013	Golden Time	Meiko		
2013	Nagi-Asu: A Lull in the Sea	Sanae Ueda 浮田沙苗		
2014	Wizard Barristers	Cecil Sudo		
2014	The Irregular at Magic High School	Chiaki Hirakawa		
2014	One Week Friends	Ai Nishimura		
2014	The Comic Artist and His Assistants	Girlfriend		
2014	Nanana's Buried Treasure	Nanana Ryūgajō		
2014	Ai Tenchi Muyo!	Rui Aoi		
2015	Saekano: How to Raise a Boring Girlfriend	Echika Mizuhara		
2015	Jewelpet: Magical Change	Laura Fukuoji		
2015	Venus Project: Climax	Mizuki Sarashina		
2015–16	The Asterisk War	Yanon Kujizuka	2 seasons	
2016	High School Fleet	Kayoko Himeji		
2016	Soul Buster	Zhou Yu		
2016	To Be Hero	Prince (fourth grade)		
2017	Tenchi Muyo Ryo-Ohki	Ringo Tatsuki	OVA series 4	
2018	Yu Yu Hakusho	Maya Kitajima	OVA ("Two Shots")	
2018	A Certain Magical Index III	Lancis		
2018–19	Hinomaru Sumo	Chizuko Hori		
2021	WIXOSS Diva(A)Live	Sanga Shinonome		
2021	Blue Reflection Ray	Uta Komagawa		
2023	The Fruit of Evolution 2	Helen Rosa		
2023	Umamusume: Pretty Derby 3rd Season	Royce and Royce		
2024	My Deer Friend Nokotan	Anko Koshi		
2026	A Misanthrope Teaches a Class for Demi-Humans	Tobari Haneda		
2026	Playing Death Games to Put Food on the Table	Chie		

=== Anime film ===
- High School Fleet: The Movie (2020), Kayoko Himeji
- Colorful Stage! The Movie: A Miku Who Can't Sing (2025), Mafuyu Asahina
- Virgin Punk: Clockwork Girl (2025), Maggie

=== Video games ===
List of voice performances in video games
Year	Title	Role	Notes	Source
2014	Omega Quintet	Kyouka		
2015	Trillion: God of Destruction	Fegor		
2018	Fighting EX Layer	Blair		
2018	The King of Fighters All Star	Kasumi Todoh		
2020	Final Fantasy VII Remake	Katie		
2020	Hatsune Miku: Colorful Stage!	Mafuyu Asahina	mobile rhythm game	
2021	Blue Archive	Juri Ushimaki		
2021	Blue Reflection: Second Light	Uta Komagawa		
2023	Umamusume: Pretty Derby	Royce and Royce	smartphone game	
	School Star Dream!	Tsukumo Kotomi	smartphone game	
	Venus Project	Mizuki Sarashina		

=== Drama CD ===
List of voice performances in drama CDs
Year	Title	Role	Notes	Source
	Venus Project	Mizuki Sarashina		

=== Dubbing ===
- Freaky, Ryler (Melissa Collazo)
- Mortal Engines, Clytie Potts (Sophie Cox)
- Shark Bait, Nat (Holly Earl)
- Catch! Teenieping, Joahping
