= Springboard (gymnastics) =

Platform used for jumping in gymnastics

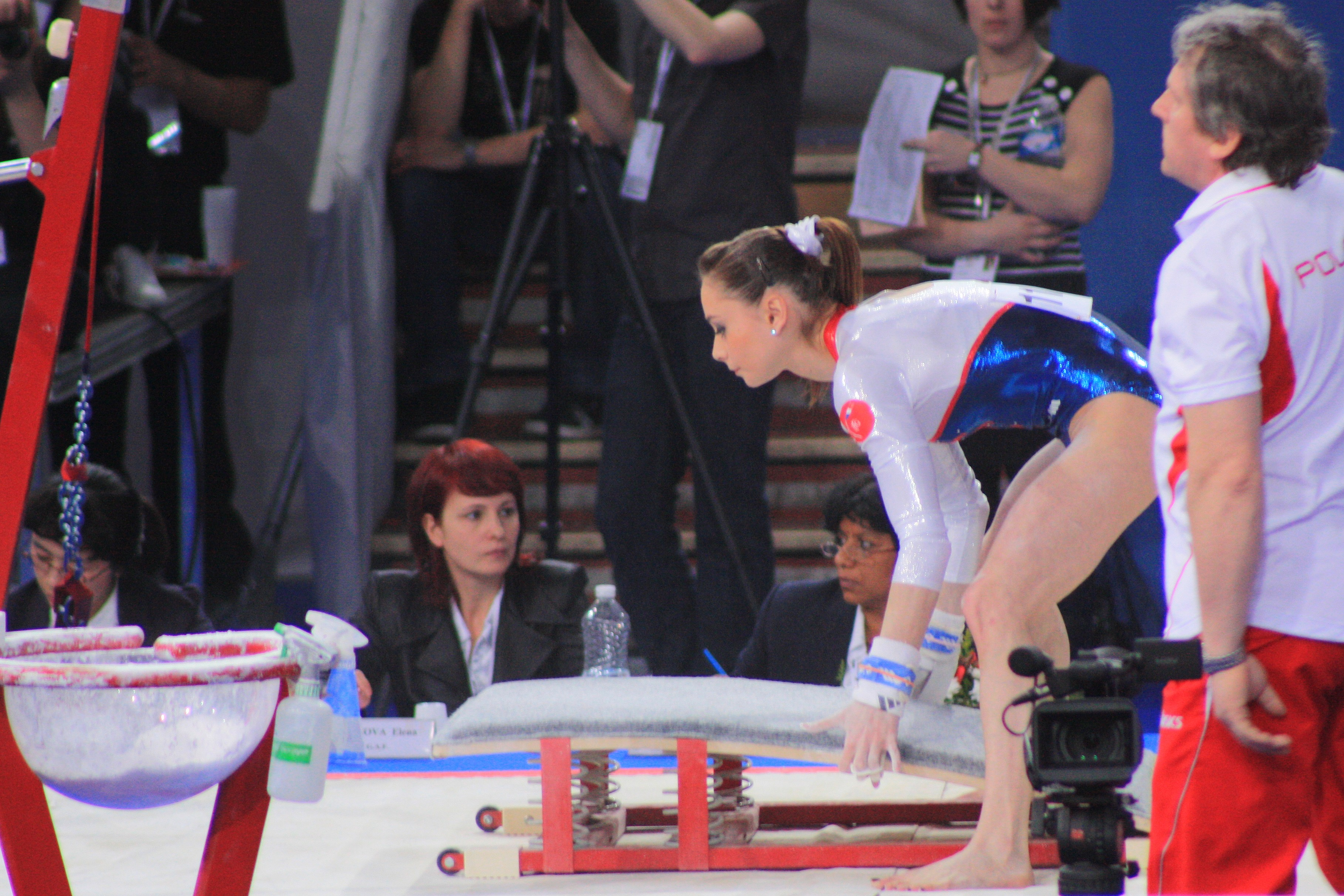
Pauline Morel placing a springboard at the uneven bars

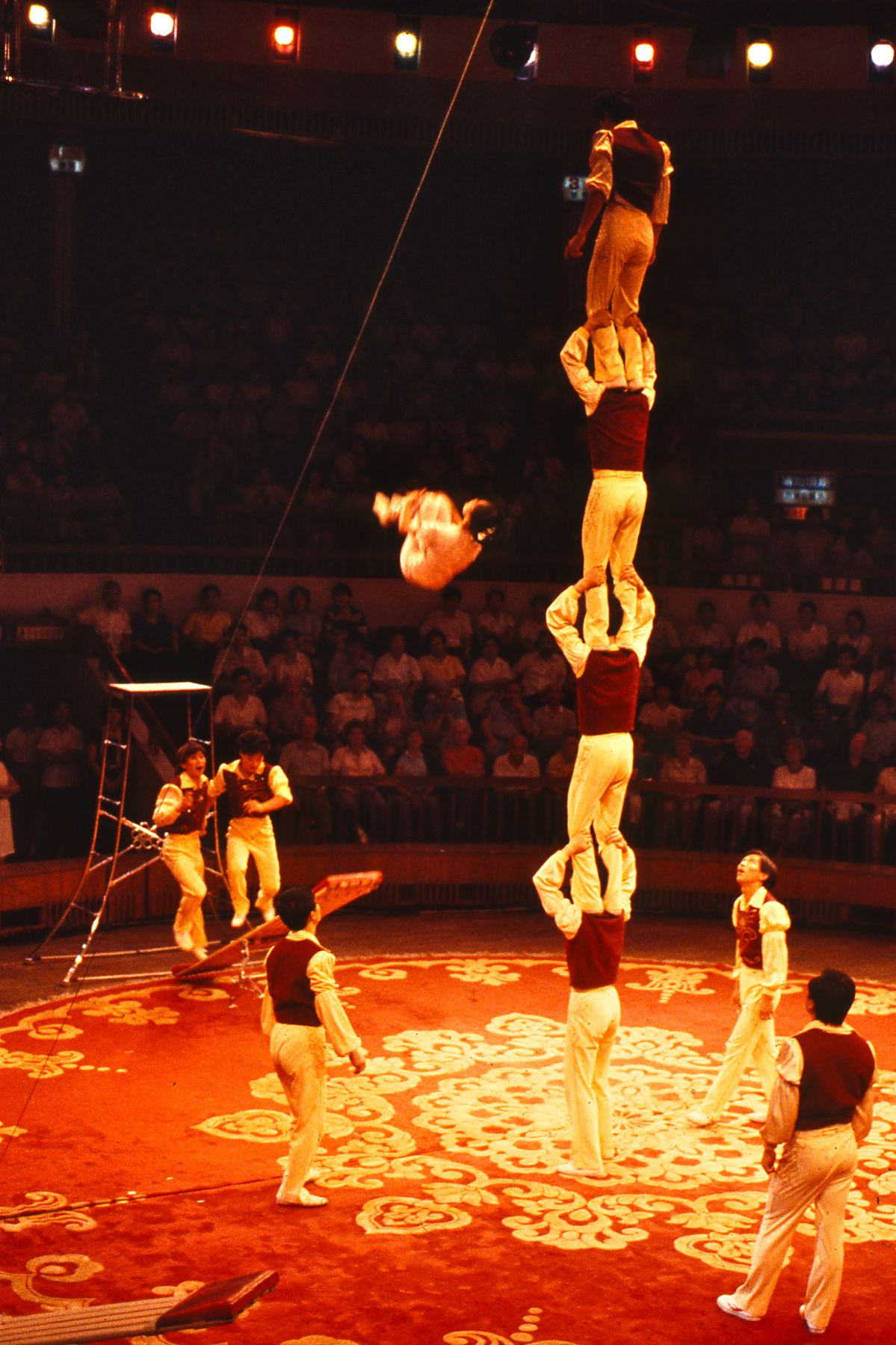
Chinese acrobat in midair after being propelled off a springboard, China, 1987

A springboard is a platform set upon one or usually multiple springs used in artistic gymnastics to propel a gymnast who jumps upon it further than if they had otherwise jumped off a fixed platform. The springboard is a vital part of the vault event and is commonly used in some routines of other events, such as the balance beam, or uneven bars, to start the event by springing onto the apparatus. The springboard is usually about 2 feet (0.6 m) wide and 4 feet (1.2 m) long.

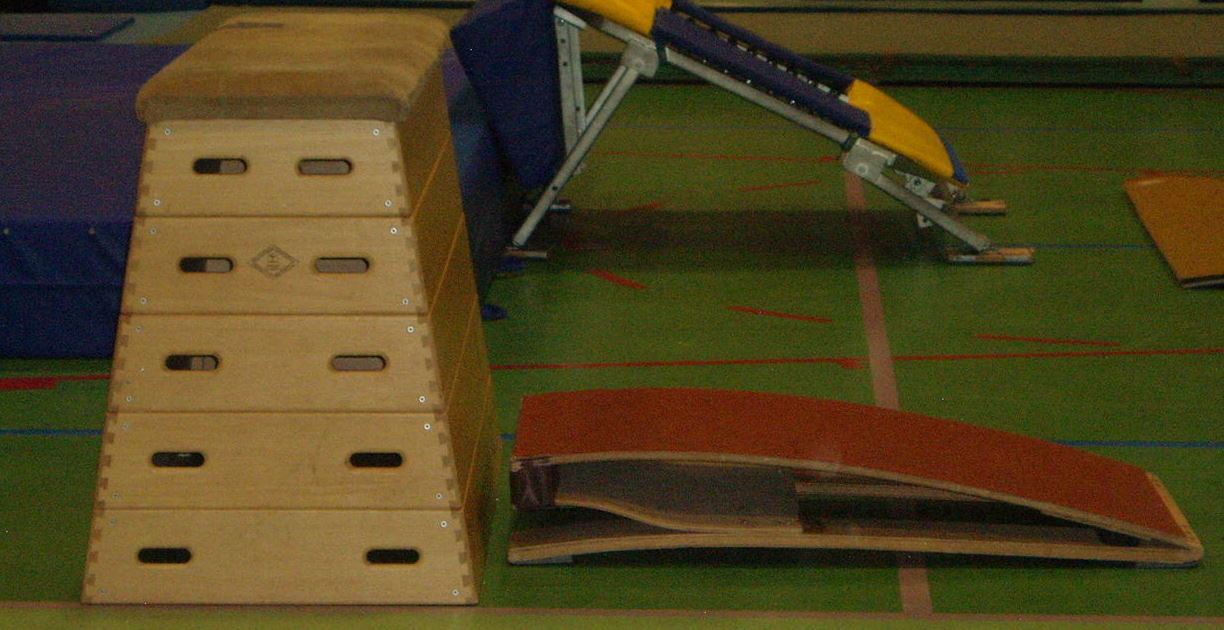
Reuther board with no springs

Development of a new type of springboard began in the 1930s. Named 'Reuther boards' after their inventor, Richard Reuther, they allowed gymnasts to gain more speed and height when vaulting. The first Olympics they were used in was the 1956 Summer Olympics. After boards with springs were introduced, for a time, which was type of board was used varied by competition, as the regulations did not specify. The 1991 World Championships used springboards, while the 1992 Summer Olympics used Reuther boards.

At modern competitions, two kinds of springboards are provided, a 'hard' board and a 'soft' board. Gymnasts may choose between the hard and soft boards for vault, but they may only choose to use the soft board on other events.
