= Shikairo Days =

2024 single by Shika-bu

- Cover art featuring Nokotan, Koshitan, Anko and Bashame

Single by Shika-bu (Note: Consisting Megumi Han as Nokotan, Saki Fujita as Koshitan, Rui Tanabe as Anko Koshi, and Fūka Izumi as Meme Bashame)
- Language: Japanese
- Written: Splash Sound Studio; Studio Earkth
- Released: July 8, 2024
- Length: 3:21
- Label: Lantis
- Composer: Yūki Waga
- Lyricist: Kana Yaginuma

Alternative cover
- CD cover

Music videos
- Shikairo Days on YouTube

"Shikairo Days" (Japanese: シカ色デイズ, Hepburn: Shikairo Deizu; lit. 'Deer-colored Days') is a Japanese song by Shika-bu (シカ部) performed by Megumi Han, Saki Fujita, Rui Tanabe, and Fūka Izumi as their respective characters. It was released on July 8, 2024, and is the opening theme song of the 2024 anime My Deer Friend Nokotan.

The song became a viral meme on YouTube and TikTok.

== Production ==
The lyrics were written by Kana Yaginuma and the music was composed by Yūki Waga under the music label Lantis.

In an interview, Waga explained that while writing the song, he walked around the house repeating the phrase Shikanoko nokonoko koshitantan at every speed and rhythm that he was required to by Lantis and Twin Engine to create an "earworm" song for the anime.

== Promotion ==
On June 22, 2024, ABEMA, the streaming service that streamed My Deer Friend Nokotan, broadcast a 24-hour endurance video promoting both the song and the anime.

== Release ==
The song was released on July 8, 2024, as the opening theme of the anime My Deer Friend Nokotan. It was performed by Shika-bu, consisting of Megumi Han as Nokotan, Saki Fujita as Koshitan, Rui Tanabe as Anko Koshi, and Fūka Izumi as Meme Bashame. On September 18, 2024, after the show aired its final episode, the official music video was released on Twin Engine's official channel.

== Reception ==
=== Commercial performance ===
"Shikairo Days" debuted at number two on the Oricon Digital Singles Chart for the issue date of July 22, 2024, gaining 8,618 downloads in the first week. The CD single debuted at number 32 on the Oricon Singles Chart for the issue date of September 9, 2024, selling 1,843 copies. It also charted at number 47 on Billboard Japan's Hot 100 chart, and ranked 1st on Heatseekers Songs. It was placed 2nd in the TikTok Weekly ratings on its debut, and reached 1st place on iTunes Japan on its debut.

=== Popularity ===
The song become a viral meme on YouTube and TikTok after the official YouTube channel of Twin Engine released a 1-hour endurance video featuring Koshitan dancing in front of a deer on loop — which is an excerpt of the scene in episode 3 of the anime — on May 28, 2024, for the promotion of My Deer Friend Nokotan. It is also often described by some fans as "brainrot".

=== Critical reception ===
Akihiro Tomita of Real Sound praise the song's melody and rhythm adding that "This is a song that we can be proud of in the world, and one that could only have come from Japanese anime culture."

== Accolades ==
Awards and nominations for "Shikairo Days"
Ceremony	Year	Award	Result	Ref.
Reiwa Anisong Awards	2025	Character Song Award	Nominated	
Reiwa Anisong Awards	2025	Project Award	Won	
Reiwa Anisong Awards	2025	Anikara Award	Nominated	
11th Anime Trending Awards	2025	Opening Theme of the Year	Nominated	
47th Anime Grand Prix	2025	Best Theme Song	6th place	

== Charts ==
Weekly chart performance for "Shikairo Days"
Charts	Peak position
Japan (Japan Hot 100)	47
Japan Hot Animation (Billboard Japan)	12
Japan (Oricon)	32
Japan Anime Singles (Oricon)	10
