= Oshioshio =

Japanese manga artist and illustrator

Oshioshio (おしおしお) is a Japanese manga artist and illustrator. She is best known as the creator of the manga series Kamisama to Quintet, Sakura Maimai, and My Deer Friend Nokotan. She is also a light novel illustrator and VTuber character designer, most notably Hololive Production's Japanese VTuber Amane Kanata.

== Biography ==
Oshioshio is a native of Kanagawa Prefecture. After graduating from art school, she worked for an advertising company, but left after about a year to pursue a career in illustration. While working on doujinshi activities, she was invited by an editor at Houbunsha to make her debut as a commercial manga artist with Kamisama to Quintet, a yonkoma manga depicting the campus life of art school students. She also began serializing another manga, Sakura Maimai, in Comic Cune.

Through her editor at Comic Cune, Oshioshio was approached by an editor at MF Bunko J for her first light novel illustration: Noboru Okazaki's Hime-sama, Sekai Horobu kara Gohan Tabete Ikimasuyo!. Oshioshio, who had long admired light novel illustrator Kouhaku Kuroboshi, subsequently made her light novel illustration debut with the first volume in 2016.

She is the character designer for Hololive Production VTuber Amane Kanata and Nijisanji VTuber Soraboshi Kirame. Real Sound said that both character designs "are short and small-chested; these two points seem to be non-negotiable for Oshio, and even when the two of them later asked her to make them taller "make her bust bigger" or "make her taller," she refused every time".

In 2021, she exhibited at the 10th edition of Sankei Shimbun's Eshi100 exhibition. In September 2022, her first solo exhibition, Seikō (青光; lit. 'Blue light'), was held at Pixiv Waen Gallery. In February 2023, Ichijinsha released an art book on her work, Oshioshio Gashū: Ao no Hibi.

She later began serializing the comedy manga My Deer Friend Nokotan in Shōnen Magazine Edge. In 2024, she also assisted in the production of the manga's anime adaptation, including with casting and adding anime-only content.

Among her themes are illustrations of sad, crying girls, as well as "conveying the emotions of characters, focusing on illustrations of fragile and delicate girls".

== Works ==
=== Manga ===
- Kamisama to Quintet (2014-2016)
- Sakura Maimai (2014-2018)
- My Deer Friend Nokotan (2019–present)

=== Illustrations ===
- Hime-sama, Sekai Horobu kara Gohan Tabete Ikimasuyo (2016)
- King of Prism by Pretty Rhythm Comic Anthology (2016)
- Hinako Note Official Comic Anthology (2017, frontispiece)
- Isekai-dō no Mia: Omochikaeri wa Ajin Maid desu ka? (2017; written by Kōta Amana)
- Ore no Tachi Ichi wa Koko Janai! (2017-2018; written by Sei Utsuda)
- Avalon Bitter: Kōfuku o Nozomu Yuri Anthology (2018)
- Tonari no Kyūketsuki-san Official Comic Anthology (2018, color illustration)
- Shitsuren Bunko: Kakioroshi Shitsuren Shōsetsu Anthology (2019, cover)
- Gokumon Nadeshiko koko ni Ari (2023; originally by Nanao Fushimi)

=== Others ===
- Oshioshio Gashū: Ao no Hibi (おしおしお画集 青の日々; lit. 'Oshioshio Art Collection: Blue Days'; 2023)
