= Diane Ellingson Smith =

American gymnast, teacher, and speaker (1959–2019)

- Full name: Diane Ellingson Smith
- Born: May 27, 1959 Salt Lake City, Utah
- Died: July 12, 2019 (aged 60)

Gymnastics career
- Former countries represented: United States
- College team: University of Utah
- Former coaches: Paul Hunt; Michelle Pond; Greg Marsden

Diane Ellingson Smith (27 May 1959 – 12 July 2019) was an American gymnast, teacher, and inspirational speaker.

== Biography ==
Diane Ellingson Smith was born and raised in Salt Lake City, Utah, and had six siblings.

At fourteen years old, Ellingson Smith traded cleaning for gymnastics lessons. She competed with the Utah Academy of Gymnastics during high school with coaches Paul Hunt and Michelle Pond, and then competed on the Utah Red Rocks gymnastics team with coach Greg Marsden at the University of Utah. She won the Junior Olympic All-Around Championship, Region 1 Senior Division Championship, and placed second in nationals on the bars. She was a three-time All-American champion on the uneven parallel bars and finished second in the National Championships in 1981. She led her University of Utah teammates to their first national AIAW championship in 1981.

In 1981, at age 22, she joined the first U.S. Professional Gymnastics Classic. On the first day of the tour, she over-rotated while landing a vaulting horse move and landed on her neck, sustaining an injury that left her paralyzed from the chest down.

After the accident, Ellingson Smith completed her degree in childhood education at the University of Utah and became an elementary school teacher and inspirational speaker. A book, Don’t You Dare Give Up, was published about her in 1991.

After her teaching career, she founded and serves as president of a sales, motivation, leadership and achievement company

That same year, she married Scott Smith and became the stepmother to four children. She was a torchbearer for the 1996 Olympic Games and the 2002 Winter Olympic Games. Ellingson Smith died on 12 July 2019, aged 60, from undisclosed causes.

== Legacy ==
The Diane Ellingson Award, an award given to the most inspirational University of Utah gymnast, is named after her.
