= Sakura Maimai =

Japanese manga series

さくらマイマイ
- Manga
- Written by: Oshioshio
- Published by: Media Factory
- Magazine: Comic Cune
- Original run: August 2014 – February 2018
- Volumes: 3

Sakura Maimai (さくらマイマイ) is a Japanese manga series by Oshioshio. It has been serialized from August 2014 to February 2018 in Kadokawa's seinen manga magazine Comic Cune, which was originally a magazine supplement in the seinen manga magazine Monthly Comic Alive until August 2015. It was collected in three tankōbon volumes from October 2015 to March 2018. Sakura Maimai is also available on Kadokawa Corporation's ComicWalker website.

== Media ==
=== Manga ===
Sakura Maimai is a four-panel manga series by Oshioshio. It began serialization in Comic Cune's October 2014 issue released on August 27, 2014; At first, Comic Cune was a "magazine in magazine" placed in Monthly Comic Alive, later it became independent of Comic Alive and changed to a formal magazine on August 27, 2015. Sakura Maimai is also available on Kadokawa Corporation's ComicWalker website. It was collected in three tankōbon volumes from October 2015 to March 2018.
