= Paul Hunt (gymnast) =

American gymnastics coach and clown

Paul Hunt (born 1952–1953) is an American gymnastics coach, and gymnastics clown. Hunt has performed comedic women's gymnastics routines, including the uneven bars, floor exercises, and the balance beam since 1980. He has performed on US and international television, including Wide World of Sports and America's Funniest Videos.

Born in Illinois, he was a competitive men's gymnast at the University of Illinois in the early 1970s. He won the Big Ten Conference individual championship in the floor exercise in 1971, and had another win in the floor exercise in 1973.

Hunt had always had an interest in circus performances, both gymnastic and clowning. His comedy routines were parodies of women's gymnastics, and his "Paulette" clown character evolved from his gymnastic coaching of girls, demonstrating to them what they were doing wrong, and showing them how to improve. While demonstrating a backflip for a female student, he realized the comic value of a man performing women's gymnastics, and he then developed several complex routines, which he performed during gymnastics competitions for comic relief.

Hunt's small stature – he was 5'2" tall and weighed 140 lbs., according to a sports announcer describing his 1988 floor exercise routine – made it possible for him to closely mimic the movements of female athletes on regulation-sized equipment, while at the same time applying his natural male strength to delicate artistic routines. During his act he usually wore a skirted leotard and tied ribbons in his hair, but retained his mustache and did not shave his hirsute body. He presented a mixture of his own men's floor exercise gymnastics; brief interludes of male bodybuilding poses, such as a rear lat spread in the style of Frank Zane; and broadly comedic versions of the well-known balance beam, uneven bars, and floor exercise routines of then-popular female artistic gymnasts. During the 1970s and 1980s he performed all over the world under a shifting series of stage names, including Paulette Huntesque, Paulina Huntescu, Pauletta Huntenova, and Paulette Huntinova. He was well-accepted by the female gymnastics community, touring with and parodying the routines of many superstars of the era, such as Olga Korbut, Nadia Comaneci, Mary Lou Retton, Kim Zmeskal, and Shannon Miller. He also toured as a gymnastic clown with the U.S., Russian, Romanian, and Chinese Olympic sports teams.

In 1974 Hunt moved to Utah and began coaching there at Hunt's Gymnastics Academy, also known as Hunt's Gym, in Salt Lake City. The gym closed at the end of December 2020 due to lost revenue from the COVID-19 pandemic lockdown. With the closure of his academy, Hunt retired from coaching.
