= Venus Project (franchise) =

Japanese media franchise

ヴィーナス プロジェクト (Vīnasu Purojekuto)
- Genre: Science fiction
- Video game
- Developer: Galat
- Genre: Card battle role-playing game
- Platform: PlayStation Vita
- Released: JP: April 21, 2015
- Anime television series

Venus Project -Climax-
- Directed by: Takehiro Nakayama
- Written by: Gō Zappa
- Studio: Nomad
- Licensed by: NA: Funimation
- Original network: Tokyo MX
- Original run: July 12, 2015 – September 20, 2015
- Episodes: 6

Venus Project (Japanese: ヴィーナス プロジェクト, Hepburn: Vīnasu Purojekuto) is a Japanese multimedia franchise conceived by software and 3D character studio Galat. The project involves Japanese idols living in Japan in the near future. A video game for the PlayStation Vita was released in April 2015. An anime television series aired in Japan between July and September 2015. A web comic is also planned for release.

== Characters ==
Eriko Hara (原 エリコ, Hara Eriko)
Voiced by: Sawako Hata
Ruka Sovagasky (流華・ソバガスキー, Ruka Sobagasukī)
Voiced by: Riho Iida
Miu Nureha (濡羽 美烏, Nureha Miu)
Voiced by: Marika Hayase
Asuka Kougami (紅神 明日花, Kōgami Asuka)
Voiced by: Romi Park
Hoshi Kokujō
Voiced by: Rumi Shishido
Coach (コーチ, Kōchi)
Voiced by: Takehito Koyasu
Company President
Voiced by: Rieko Takahashi

== Music ==
Opening Theme

- Venus Drive!! by Sawako Hata & Manami Himesaki

Insert Song

- Venus Drive!! CLIMAX FinalBattle Version by Sawako Hata

== See also ==
- Extreme Hearts, similar concept: idols compete in a futuristic sports-like competition called Extreme Hearts
