= Janssen-Fritsen =

Dutch gymnastics equipment company

Janssen-Fritsen Gymnastics b.v.
- Company type: Besloten Vennootschap (privately held company limited liability company)
- Industry: Manufacturing
- Founded: 1950; 76 years ago
- Headquarters: Helmond, Netherlands
- Products: Professional gymnastics equipment
- Website: janssen-fritsen.com

Janssen-Fritsen Gymnastics b.v. is a manufacturer of professional gymnastics equipment and apparatus, based in the Netherlands.

In the mid-1990s the company pioneered the design of the vaulting table, a replacement for the pommel horse-like apparatus used since the 19th century in international competitions. The vaulting table, first introduced at the international level at the 2001 World Artistic Gymnastics Championships, has been used in Gymnastics at the 2004 and the 2008 Summer Olympics. The switch in apparatus has made the sport safer and enabled the introduction of more spectacular vaults, including Yurchenko-style vaults.
