= Luffy robberies =

2021–2022 series of robberies in Japan

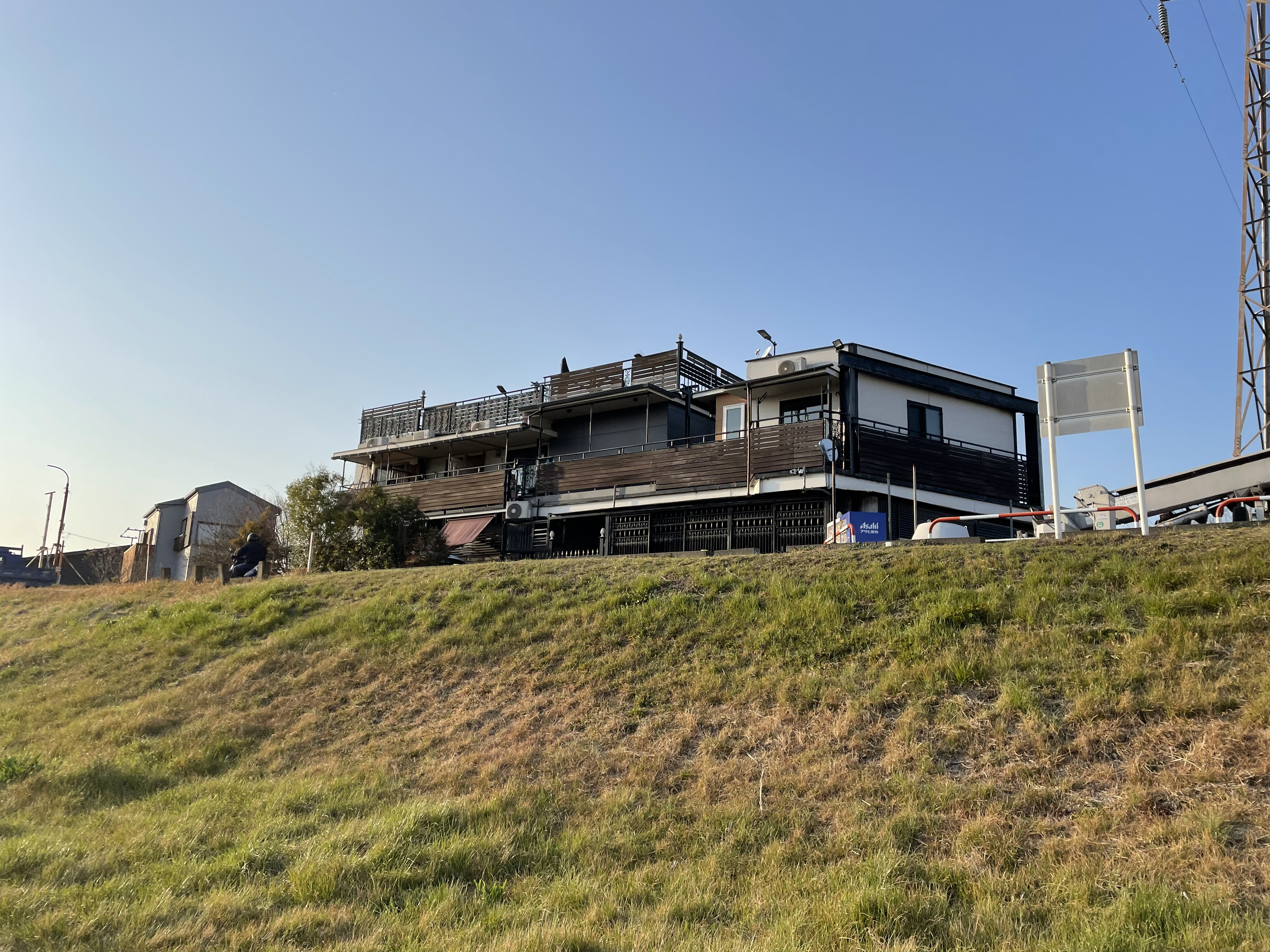
- One of the victim's house in Komae, Tokyo
- Native name: ルフィ広域強盗事件
- Date: May 2, 2022 – January 19, 2023
- Location: Japan and the Philippines
- Type: Robbery scheme
- Theme: Transnational organized crime
- Target: Residents in Japan
- Perpetrators: "Luffy" and his group

The Luffy robberies were a series of criminal incidents that occurred in Japan between 2021 and 2022. The crimes were linked to a group of Japanese nationals residing in the Philippines, reportedly led by an individual using the alias "Luffy". In 2023, four Japanese citizens suspected of involvement in the robberies were deported to Japan.

== Background ==
=== 2019 Makati hotel arrests ===
In 2019, 36 Japanese nationals part of the scam group Kakeko were arrested at a hotel in Makati, Philippines, on charges related to telecommunications fraud and extortion. The scheme was estimated to have affected approximately 1,393 victims, resulting in losses of around ¥2 billion (₱1 billion). The individuals were deported to Japan between 2020 and 2021.

Yuki Watanabe was detained at the Bureau of Immigration Bicutan Detention Center on April 19, 2021, where he remained under a summary deportation order issued on May 28, 2021. His deportation was put on hold due to a Violence Against Women and Children (VAWC) case filed against him.

Another Japanese national, Imamura Kiyoto, is also facing a VAWC case, resulting in the deferment of his deportation as well.

Yuki Watanabe, Imamura Kiyoto, Tomonobu Saito and Fujita Toshiya where all believed to be senior members of this group. As of February 2023, Japanese authorities reported the arrest of all four suspects.

== Suspects ==
Yuki Watanabe (Big Boss)

He is the leader of the group and is reported to be the "big boss" within the group.

In 2012 Yuki Watanabe was arrested together with Seiya Fujita for a safe robbery.

Imamura Kiyoto (Luffy)

It is said that Imamura "Luffy" Kiyoto had contact with Yuki Watanabe when he was working in the Susukino district in Sapporo. it is also believed that he was in charge of organizing the special fraud group Kakeko in the Philippines.

Imamura was arrested in 2008 on suspicion of violating the Entertainment Business Act, and in 2016 he was also arrested in a hit-and-run incident.

Seiya Fujita (Kim)

Seiya Fujita also known as Kim is believed to be the recruiter of the gang and used social media to solicit people to commit robbery's or fraud.

Seiya Fujita and Yuki Watanabe are believed to have been close friends for over 20 years. He used to run a pub in Susukino but this closed after a few years. After this he used to work in a real estate company, but was fired for embezzlement.

Tomonobu Kojima (Tatsuhiko Shiratori)

Kojima helped managing the operations of the scams.

Kojima was in debt and traveled to the Philippines in the summer of 2018.

He then joined the organization and managed the finances.

== Activities ==
Criminal activity in Japan associated with the Luffy robberies is believed to have begun in the summer of 2021, with over 50 cases reported across 14 prefectures linked to the group. Watanabe, Kiyoto, Saito, and Toshiya—the suspected ringleaders of the operation—remain in detention in the Philippines.

The group allegedly recruited accomplices through social media by offering so-called "dark part-time jobs" with promises of high financial compensation. Instructions were communicated to gang members via the Telegram messaging application. Accomplices reportedly posed as police officers or officials from the Japan Financial Services Agency to deceive victims into believing their bank accounts had been compromised. They would then visit the victims' residences to obtain their ATM cards and subsequently withdraw funds from their accounts. Accomplices in Japan were allegedly directed by individuals based in the Philippines operating under the aliases "Luffy" and "Kim".

== 2023 deportations and arrests ==
On January 30, 2023, the Government of Japan formally requested the deportation of four suspects in connection with the Luffy robberies. Although a deportation request had initially been made in 2019, the suspects remained in the Philippines due to pending legal proceedings related to separate criminal charges.

Toshiya Fujita and Kiyoto Imamura were deported to Japan on February 7, 2023, following the dismissal of their cases in the Philippines. Yuki Watanabe and Tomonobu Saito were deported the following day.

The Philippine Department of Justice coordinated with the Integrated Bar of the Philippines and the Bureau of Immigration to review the previously pending charges against the four Japanese nationals. These cases have been suspected of being contrived to delay or prevent their deportation to Japan.

On May 26, 2024, Bureau of Immigration Commissioner Norman Tansingco announced that Rendel Ryan Sy of the Fugitive Search Unit had arrested Nagaura Hiroki, 26, on Estrella Avenue in Poblacion, Makati. Hiroki, who is charged with telecommunications fraud and subject to an arrest warrant for theft issued by the Tokyo Summary Court under the Penal Code of Japan, underwent deportation proceedings and was detained at Camp Bagong Diwa.
