= Front handspring vaults =

Front or forward handspring vaults begin with a front handspring onto the vaulting table, followed by a salto. There are many variations of handspring vaults, including the handspring double salto forward tucked.

== Sources ==
- Jancosek, Mario; Danko, Maria; Ivankova, Julia; Somos, Andrej; Zivcak, Jozef (2020). "Biomechanical Parameterization of Front Handspring Vaults". Acta Mechanica Slovaca. 24 (2): 6–12. doi:10.21496/ams.2020.016.
- Schärer, Christoph; Lehmann, Thomas; Naundorf, Falk; Taube, Wolfgang; Hübner, Klaus (2019). "The faster, the better? Relationships between run-up speed, the degree of difficulty (D-score), height and length of flight on vault in artistic gymnastics". PLOS ONE. 14 (3) e0213310. doi:10.1371/journal.pone.0213310. ISSN 1932-6203. PMC 6405201. PMID 30845256.
- Takei, Yoshiaki (1990). "Techniques Used by Elite Women Gymnasts Performing the Handspring Vault at the 1987 Pan American Games". International Journal of Sport Biomechanics. 6 (1): 29–55. doi:10.1123/ijsb.6.1.29.
- Takei, Yoshiaki (1989). "Techniques Used by Elite Male Gymnasts Performing a Handspring Vault at the 1987 Pan American Games". International Journal of Sport Biomechanics. 5 (1): 1–25. doi:10.1123/ijsb.5.1.1.
- Penitente, Gabriella; Sands, William A. (2015). "Exploratory Investigation of Impact Loads During the Forward Handspring Vault". Journal of Human Kinetics. 46 (1): 59–68. doi:10.1515/hukin-2015-0034 (inactive 12 July 2025). PMC 4519222. PMID 26240649.
