= Posts & Telecom Press =

- Parent company: China Industry and Information Technology Publishing and Media Group
- Founded: 1 October 1953
- Country of origin: China
- Headquarters location: No.14, Xizhaosi Street, Dongcheng District, Beijing (old site); No.11, Chengshousi Road, Fengtai District, Beijing (new site)
- Imprints: Tongqu Publishing Co., Ltd. Beijing Puhua Culture Development Co., Ltd. Beijing Turing Culture Development Co., Ltd. Beijing New Curve Publishing Consulting Co., Ltd.
- Official website: www.ptpress.com.cn/en

Posts & Telecom Press (PTP), full name "Posts & Telecommunications Press" (simplified Chinese: 人民邮电出版社; traditional Chinese: 人民郵電出版社; pinyin: Rénmín Yóudiàn Chūbǎnshè), is a large publishing house in Beijing, China. Established in 1953, PTP is now under the Ministry of Industry and Information Technology of the People's Republic of China, and mainly publishes books and periodicals in the fields of communications, electronics, economics, management, transportation, computers, and children education. Among them, the market share of computer retail books ranks first in China.

== History ==
The following is a brief introduction of PTP's history.

In October 1953, the "People's Posts and Telecommunications Press" was established, with its Chinese name written by Mao Zedong.

In October 1958, the "China Post and Telecommunications Workers" newspaper was merged into the Press.

In May 1969, the People's Posts and Telecommunications Press was abolished.

In May 1973, the People's Posts and Telecommunications Press was restored.

On May 28, 2009, the Press was rated as a national first-class publishing house by the General Administration of Press and Publication and was awarded the title of "Top 100 Book Publishing Units in China".

In May 2010, the Press was officially transformed into a state-owned enterprise.

In December 2018, the People's Posts and Telecommunications Press was renamed "Posts and Telecommunications Press Co., Ltd."

== Current situation ==
At present, Posts & Telecom Press has more than 750 employees. It publishes more than 2,600 new books annually, covering the areas of communications, computer science, science popularization, electronics and electrical engineering, college and technical school textbooks, psychology, workplace motivation, economics and management, art, photography, design, music, sports and leisure and children. Among them, computer, art, photography, sports and leisure categories rank first in the country.

PTP's first joint venture publishing company in the People's Republic of China, Children's Fun Publishing Co., Ltd (established in a joint venture with Denmark's Egmont Group in 1994), is a well-known children's book brand. Its Mickey Mouse magazine and Pleasant Goat and Big Big Wolf series of books were successful. The publishing house also hosts Shangman, a long-form original youth comic magazine that is rare in China mainland.

== Honors ==
The Posts & Telecom Press has won a number of honor titles, including:

- National Civilized Unit,
- Model of Civilized Units in Central and State Organs
- Excellent publisher in China,
- Top 100 book publishers in China
- Advanced publisher of China Publishing Government Award.
