= Yami baito =

Japanese term for criminal gig work

Yami baito (闇バイト; lit. 'dark part-time job') is a term used for recruitment of people without previous criminal involvement for criminal activities in Japan, often promising high pay for an easy job. The recruitments, often by tokuryū groups, take place on social media and employment websites. The Japanese police has warned that people recruited through these methods are forced to provide personal information, are often "disposed after use" and are rarely actually paid.

== Description ==
Recruitment messages for yami baito are usually found on social media platforms such as Twitter and employment websites, promising high pay and easy jobs. The Japanese police warns that these promises are false, and criminal organizations, such as the yakuza, use people recruited via these methods as disposable. People who are recruited are usually asked for personal information, such as Identity documents, which are later used for threats of harm when the recruited person refused to cooperate.

People recruited via these methods are usually young and even minors. In 2023, 991 out of 2,373 arrested for fraud were recruited from social media, and 763 out of 2,373 were recruited by people they know.

Types of illegal yami baito jobs include drug trafficking, robbery (or driving for robbers), fraud, and SIM swap scams.

== Criminal cases and prevention ==
From May 2022 to January 2023, a series of robberies, later named as Luffy robberies occurred using people recruited via social media, with several victims injured and a 90 year old woman killed during the robberies.

A series of over 15 robberies, termed the Shutoken robberies, occurred in the Kantō region with 40 recruited people arrested from August 2024, continuing as of November 2024.

A joint investigation headquarters was formed between Chiba, Kanagawa, and Saitama prefectural police forces in October 18, 2024 to prevent the series of yami baito robberies in the region.

In October 22, 2024, Shigeru Ishiba expressed willingness to include costs for anti-yami baito recruitment in the 2025 budget.
