= Balance beam =

Artistic gymnastics apparatus

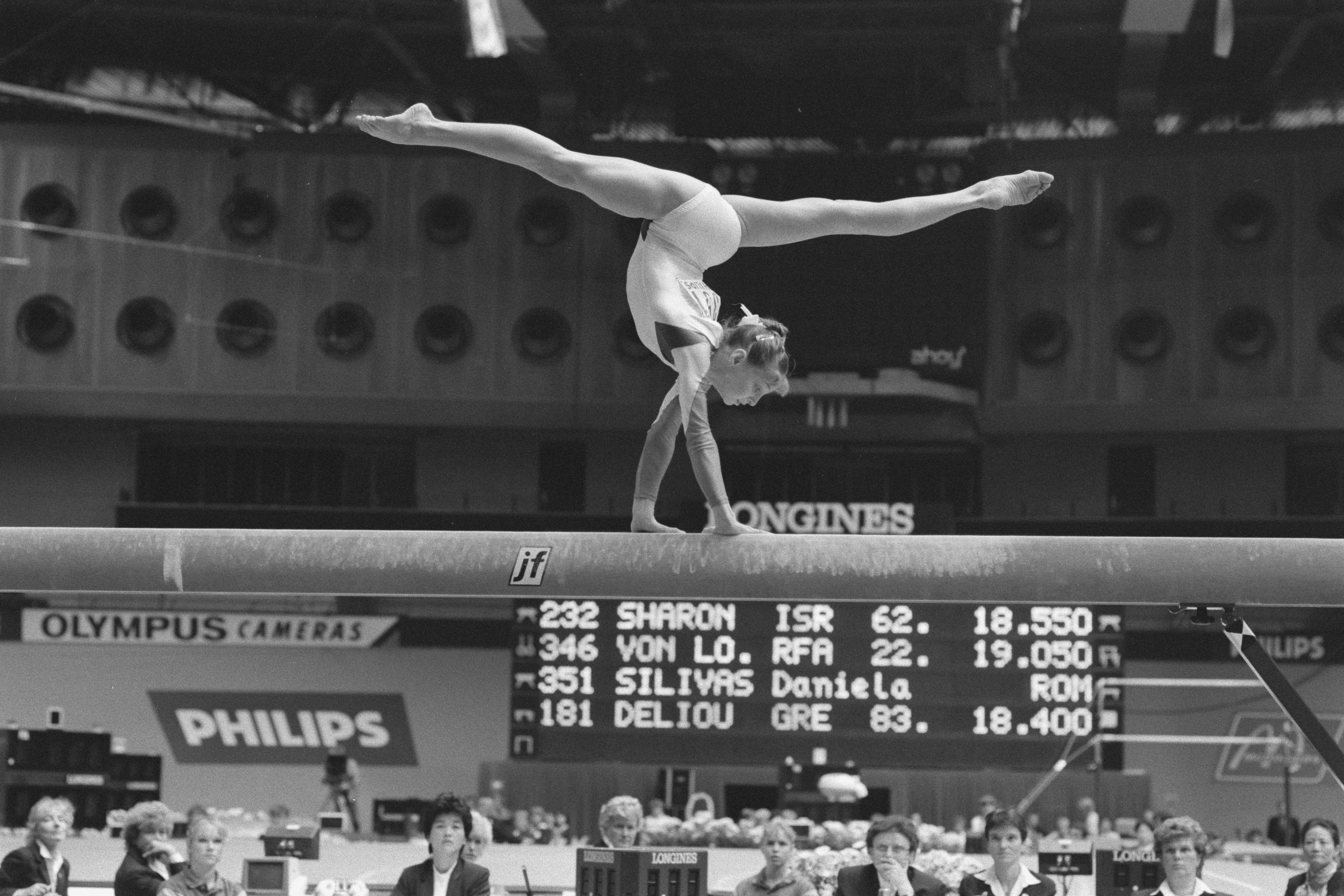
Daniela Silivaș performing on the balance beam at the 1987 World Championships

The balance beam is a rectangular artistic gymnastics apparatus and an event performed using the apparatus. The apparatus and the event are sometimes simply called "beam". The English abbreviation for the event in gymnastics scoring is BB. The balance beam is performed competitively only by female gymnasts.

== The apparatus ==
The beam is a small, thin beam that is raised from the floor on a leg or stand at both ends. It is usually covered with leather-like material and is only four inches wide.

Balance beams used in international gymnastics competitions must conform to the guidelines and specifications set forth by the International Gymnastics Federation Apparatus Norms brochure. Several companies manufacture and sell beams, including AAI (USA), Janssen-Fritsen (Europe) and Acromat (Australia). Most gymnastics schools purchase and use balance beams that meet the FIG's standards, but some may also use beams with carpeted surfaces for practice situations. While learning new skills, gymnasts often work on floor beams with the same dimensions and surface of regulation apparatus but are set a very short distance from or on the ground. They may also work on medium beams, mini beams, road beams, or even lines on a mat.

Originally, the beam surface was plain polished wood. In earlier years, some gymnasts competed on a beam made of basketball-like material. However, this beam type was eventually banned due to its extreme slipperiness. Since the 1980s, beams have been covered in leather or suede. In addition, they are now also sprung to accommodate the stress of high-difficulty tumbling, turns, and poses.

The Fédération Internationale de Gymnastique (FIG) publishes the apparatus's measurements in the Apparatus Norms brochure.

- Height: 125 centimetres (4.10 ft)
- Length: 500 centimetres (16 ft)
- Width: 10 centimetres (3.9 in)

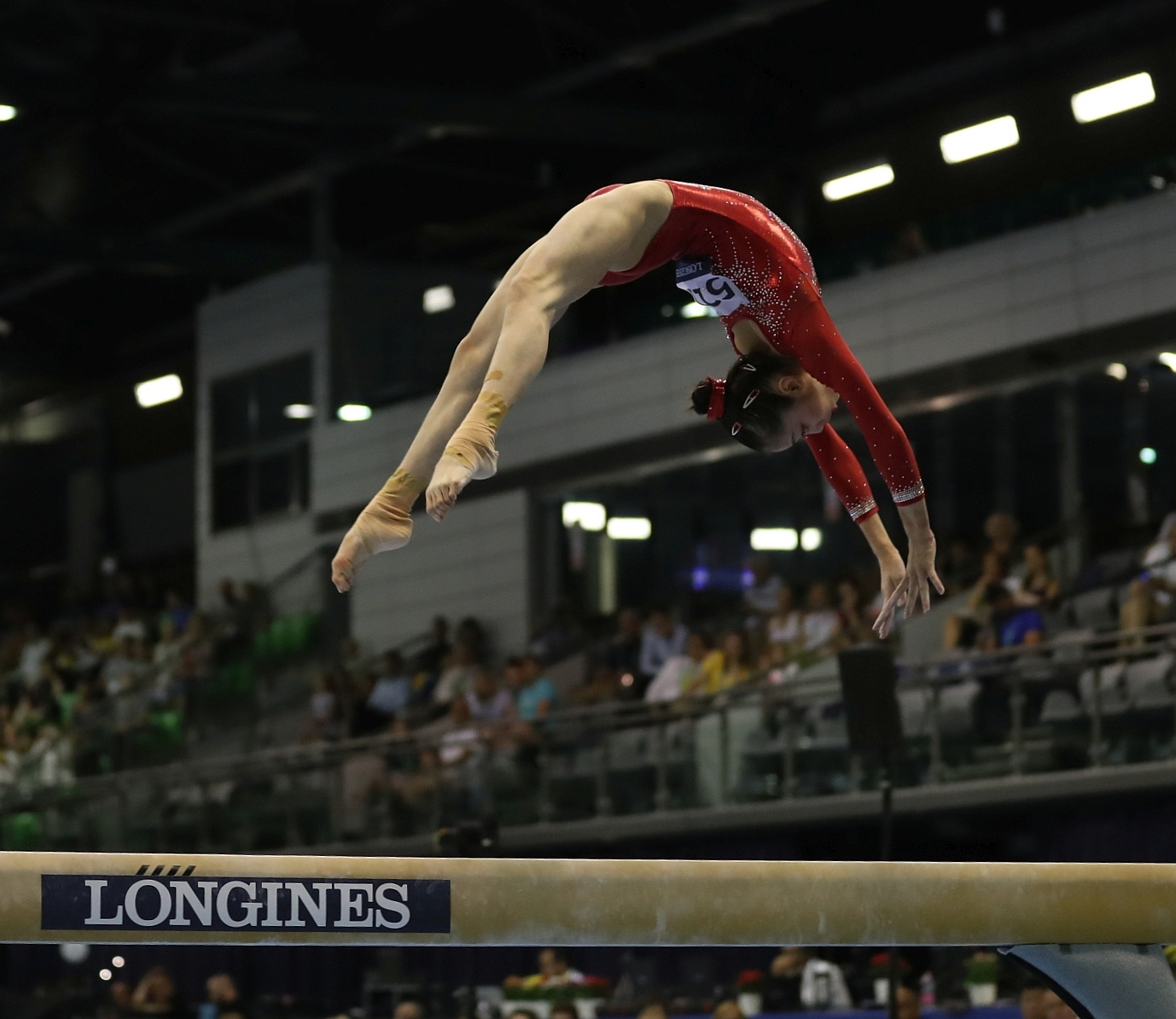
Chinese gymnast Wei Xiaoyuan competing on the beam at the 2019 Junior World Championships.

== Competition ==
A beam routine must consist of:

- A connection of two dance elements, one a leap, jump, or hop with legs in a 180-degree split
- A full turn on one foot
- One series of two acrobatic skills, one being a salto
- Acrobatic elements in different directions (forward/sideward and backward)
- A dismount

The gymnast may mount the beam using a springboard or from the mat; however, the mount must come from the Code of Points. The routines can last up to 90 seconds.

=== Scoring ===
For detailed information on score tabulation, please see the Code of Points article.

Several aspects of the performance determine the gymnast's final mark. All elements in the routine, as well as all errors, are noted by the judges.

Deductions are taken for all errors made while on the beam, including lapses in control, balance checks (i.e., wobbling or stumbling to maintain balance), poor technique and execution, and failure to fulfill the required Code of Points elements. Falls automatically incur a deduction depending on the level the gymnast is on.

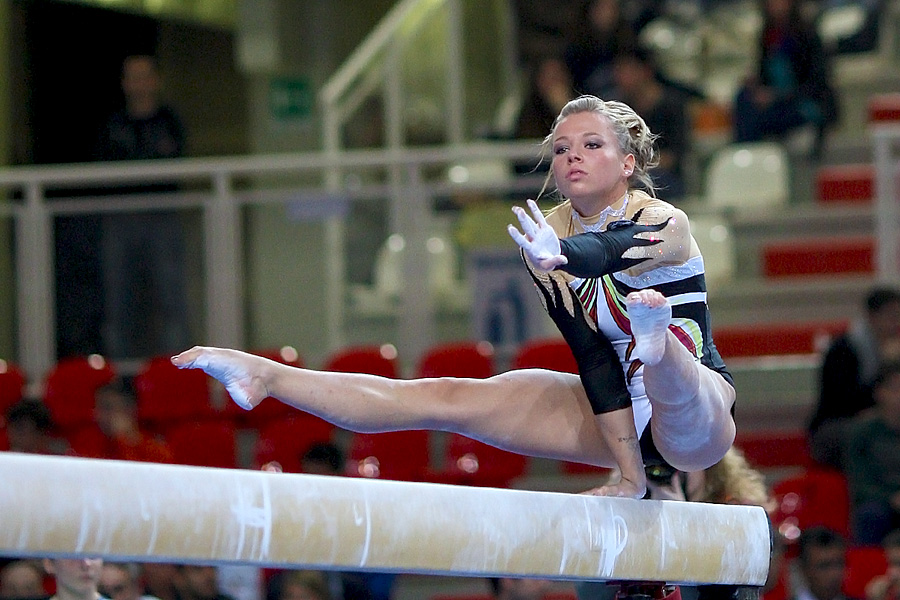
Dorina Böczögő performing a one-arm press hold during her mount, 2012.

=== Rules ===
The gymnast may compete barefoot or wear special beam shoes if she chooses. She may also chalk her hands and/or feet for added stability on the apparatus. Small markings may also be placed on the beam.

Once the exercise has started, the gymnast's coach may not spot her or interfere. The only time the gymnast may be accompanied on the podium is during a mount involving a springboard. In this instance, the coach may quickly remove the springboard from the area. In the event of a fall, once the athlete is on her feet, she has 10 seconds to remount the beam and continue the routine. If she does not return to the beam within this time limit, she cannot continue.

Under FIG rules, the maximum allowed time for a balance beam routine is 1:30 minutes. The routine is timed on the scoreboard timer, visible to gymnasts and judges. In addition, a warning tone or bell is sounded at 1:20 into the exercise. If the gymnast has not left the beam by 1:30, another bell is sounded, and a score deduction is incurred, which is 0.1.

== History ==
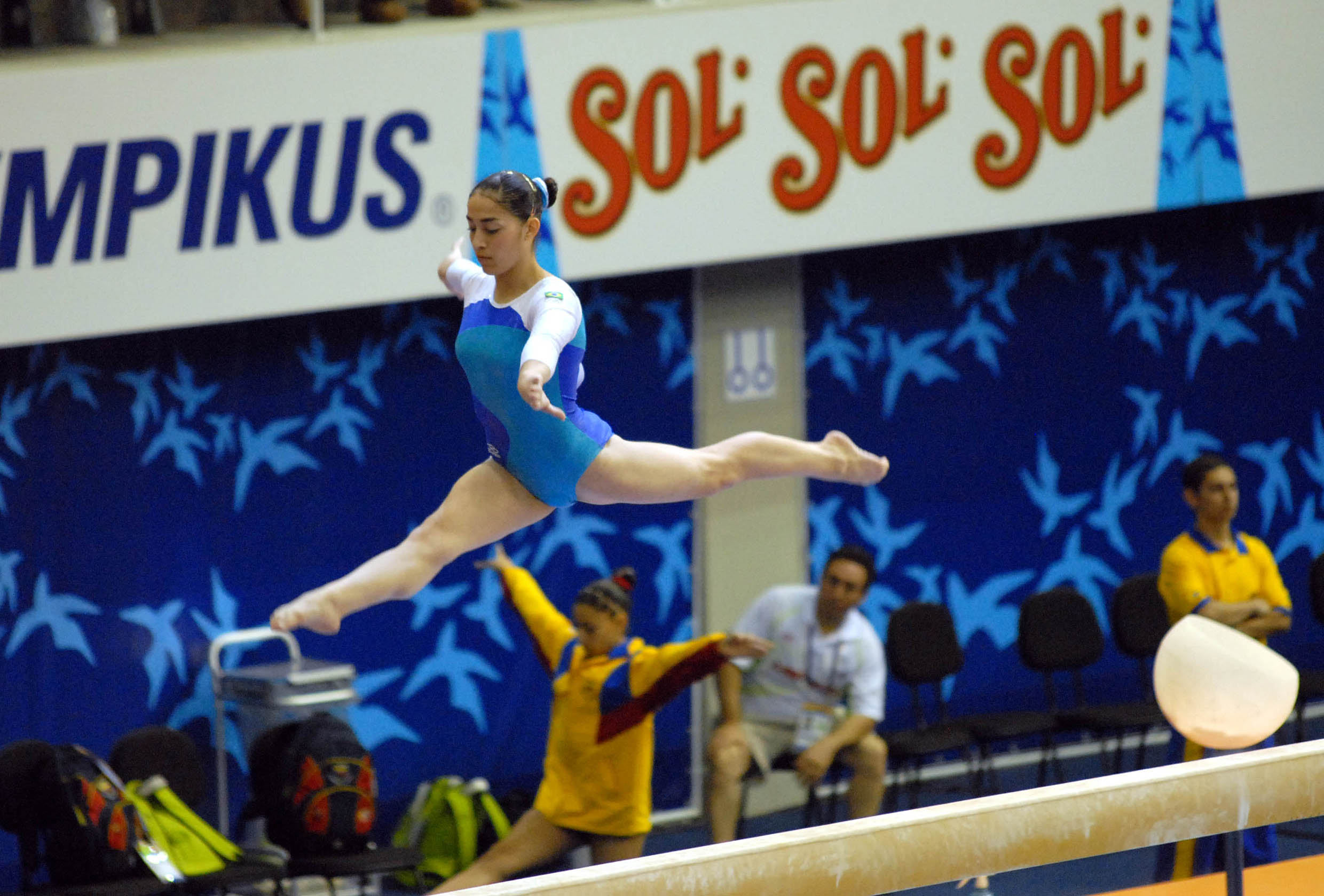
Daniele Hypólito performing on the balance beam in 2007

The idea of the balance beam came from the 19th century physical education teachers Johann Christoph Friedrich GutsMuths from Germany and Pehr Henrik Ling from Sweden. It was initially meant to be used by men. At the time, German ideas of gymnastics focused on preparing men for military roles, and when women began to be included, they were taught different exercises that focused on traits seen as feminine.

GutsMuth suggested as one exercise having children walk along a tree trunk laid horizontally and supported by two posts. Ling invented a round bar affixed to wooden blocks, which could be low to the ground or high. As Ling's bar was difficult to stand on, a low, flat wooden beam was also used. The beam was commonly used in Swedish gymnastics to train balance and other physical skills.

Friedrich Ludwig Jahn, one of the founders of gymnastics in Germany, took up GutsMuth's suggestion of using tree trunks; he dedicated four pages of a book on gymnastics published in 1816 to the beam and exercises that could be performed on it, which he suggested should be first learned on the floor for safety. The trunks he used were approximately 12 metres (39 ft) long. Other apparatuses similar to the modern balance beam were also invented in Spain, France, and Switzerland.

An engraving from 1846 shows girls walking along beams, and Swedish team Anton Santesson, a proponent of gymnastics for women, suggested in 1866 that women should train with it to develop grace. Women also sometimes used it in team exhibitions or gymnastics festivals. However, the balance beam was not typically trained by women until the 1934 World Championships, the first World Championships where women were allowed to compete. The balance beam used then was narrower than the modern beam. A Hungarian gymnast, Gaki Mezsaros, drew notice by performing a split on the beam.

In the early days of women's artistic gymnastics, beam was based more on dance than in tumbling. Even at the elite level, routines were composed of combinations of leaps, dance poses, handstands, rolls, and walkovers. In line with ideas that women should not perform feats of strength, the regulations for the 1948 Summer Olympics said that routines should not show the use of force, and gymnasts displayed little risk or complexity on the apparatus at the time. The first cartwheel performed on the balance beam in competition was done by Eva Bosáková at the 1956 Summer Olympics.

During the 1960s, pre-acrobatic elements became more common in optional (free) routines, though the beam itself, made of slippery, laminated wood and positioned over much thinner mats than today, did not lend itself to performing more difficult acrobatic feats. Compulsory (fixed) routines continued to focus on choreography and dance elements. During this decade, the most difficult acrobatic skill performed by an Olympic gymnast was a back handspring, first performed by Erika Zuchold in 1964.

Balance beam difficulty began to increase dramatically in the 1970s. Olga Korbut and Nadia Comăneci pioneered advanced tumbling combinations and aerial skills on beam; other athletes and coaches began to follow suit. The change was also facilitated by transitioning from wooden beams to safer, less slippery models with suede-covered surfaces and elastic padding. By the mid-1980s, top gymnasts routinely performed flight series and multiple aerial elements on beam.

Today, balance beam routines still consist of a mixture of acrobatic skills, dance elements, leaps, and poses, but they are significantly more difficult. It is also an individual medal competition in the Olympics.
