= Shounen Princess: Putri Harimau Naoko =

Romance manga series by Seishiro Matsuri

- Tankōbon cover depicting Nao Kusunoki

少年☆プリンセス Putri Harimau Naoko
- Genre: Romance
- Manga
- Written by: Seishiro Matsuri
- Published by: Akita Shoten
- Imprint: Champion Red Comics
- Magazine: Champion Red
- Original run: January 19, 2014 – May 19, 2014
- Volumes: 1

Shounen Princess: Putri Harimau Naoko (Japanese: 少年☆プリンセス Putri Harimau Naoko; "Boy Princess: Putri Harimau Naoko") is an otokonoko romance manga series by Seishiro Matsuri. It was serialized in Akita Shoten's monthly magazine Champion Red from January 19 to May 19, 2014, and later collected in a single tankōbon volume, for which the subtitle was changed to Putri Harimau Nao. The decision to end the series was Akita Shoten's; Matsuri said in 2019 that he would like to continue it if a publisher were to finance further production.

The story follows a young man who is mistaken for a woman by the prince of Urunei, who wants to marry him. His father, a bureaucrat in the Japanese Ministry of Foreign Affairs, is eager to please Urunei and advance his career, so he sends him against his will to Urunei as his daughter Nao. As the future crown princess, Nao has to pretend to be a woman while being targeted by assassins.

Critics enjoyed the series, finding the protagonist and his gradual turn to femininity appealing, as well as how the story goes beyond just a "reversed gender" scenario, but criticized the ending as rushed. According to Matsuri, sales were positively affected by the premiere of the anime series Himegoto, which also features a cross-dressing male character.

== Plot ==
Shounen Princess: Putri Harimau Naoko is an otokonoko romance story and follows Naotora Kusunoki, the son of a bureaucrat in the Japanese Ministry of Foreign Affairs. The prince of Urunei, a wealthy Southeast Asian ally to Japan, has seen a picture of Naotora, and, mistaking him for a woman, requests to marry him. Despite Naotora's protests, his father obliges, eager to please Urunei and advance his career, and sends him to Urunei as his daughter under the name Nao, cross-dressing in a revealing Uruneian outfit. Arriving in Urunei, Nao worries about passing as female, but the press, there to photograph the future princess, calls him a beautiful woman. At his hotel, an assassin from a purist faction opposing commoners marrying into the royal family attacks Nao, but his bodyguard Ahmad saves him.

Visiting a market with Ahmad, Nao overhears a rumor that he is Putri Harimau reborn – the legendary Eastern tigress spirit who founded Urunei alongside the royal family's dragon-god ancestor. Nao realizes he finds Ahmad attractive, but they are interrupted by another assassination attempt, which is only stopped when the assassins learn that Ahmad is prince Ahmad bin Shaya Rahman in disguise. Nao later learns that Ahmad is a woman disguised as a man when accidentally seeing her bathing with her confidant Major Malika. In the women-only inner palace, Nao risks revealing that he has a penis, and is bullied by noblewomen and the king's mother for being a foreign commoner, but Ahmad defends him.

Nao begins to worry that femininity feels natural, when he is confronted by Jemal Wahid, a masked man offering to return him to Japan if he cooperates with a plot to reveal Ahmad's gender by drugging her and leaving her naked in public. Nao prevents the plot and saves Ahmad, but the two fall into the ocean after being chased by Jemal. After waking up on an island, they kiss while Nao contemplates how their relationship may require him to keep cross-dressing. Ahmad tells Nao that Jemal is a descendant of the royal family and the only person who could challenge her claim to the throne.

Jemal steals Putri Harimau's sword, used in Urunei's enthronement ceremonies; confronting him, Nao learns that the queen and prince died in an accident fifteen years prior, and that Ahmad, the prince's twin sister, has taken his place. Unable to take back the sword with force, Nao does so through seduction. Jemal does not believe Nao can use it, as legend says only Putri Harimau can unsheathe it, but Nao succeeds, confirming him as her reincarnation. Jemal forcibly kisses Nao and proclaims that he has everything as the true king – the sword, bloodline, and Putri Harimau – when Ahmad arrives to place flowers at her family's death site. She confronts Jemal, but Malika shoots her and swears fealty to Jemal.

Locked in his room, Nao learns that Jemal plans to kill Ahmad at sea. Nao contacts the purist faction, allying on the condition that he cannot marry Ahmad. Boarding the boat, they learn that Ahmad is in safety, with a decoy doll in her place: Malika had only pretended to support Jemal, and had faked her earlier attack on Ahmad. Malika shoots Jemal, and he falls overboard, pulling Nao with him in hopes of drowning him. Underwater, Nao surprises Jemal by revealing he has a penis, making Jemal lose his grip and sink as Nao returns to the boat. Nao thinks he will never see Ahmad again due to his promise, but having witnessed his actions, the purist faction pledges loyalty to him. Nao and Ahmad kiss and return to land to plan their wedding, as Nao realizes that as princess he will have to continue wearing women's clothes forever. In an epilogue, the sword is discovered to contain a map.

== Production and release ==
Shounen Princess was written and illustrated by Seishiro Matsuri and was serialized by Akita Shoten in Japanese in their monthly magazine Champion Red, from the March 2014 issue, which was published on January 19, 2014, until the July issue, published on May 19, 2014. Akita Shoten later collected the series as a single, 200-page tankōbon volume under its Champion Red Comics imprint and released it together with an epilogue on June 20, 2014; for this collected edition, the subtitle was changed to Putri Harimau Nao. Art prints with illustrations of Nao were made available to readers buying the Champion Red debut issue of Shounen Princess and the tankōbon volume.

One of the series' themes was the concept that boys who "become girls" end up taking on a type of heroism, an idea that Matsuri said he felt vindicated in believing in after reading Mayao Masayoshi's manga Shishunki Bitter Change. The ending to the series indicates that a continuation was planned, with a "to be continued?"; in 2019, Matsuri said that it had been Akita Shoten's decision to end the production and that he would like to continue the series but would need a publisher to finance the production costs.

=== Collected edition ===
No.	Release date	ISBN
1	June 20, 2014	978-4-253-23368-2
Chapter 1: "Tora no Musume to Ryū Ōji" (虎の娘と龍王子; "The Tiger Girl and the Dragon Prince"); Chapter 2: "Kōkyū no Yami" (後宮の闇; "The Inner Palace's Darkness"); Chapter 3: "Nazo no Otoko Jemaru" (謎の男・ジェマル; "The Mysterious Man Jemal"); Chapter 4: "Ōja no Jōken" (王者の条件; "Conditions of a Ruler"); Chapter 5: "Otome Sairin" (乙女再臨; "Return of the Maiden"); "Omake: Fragments" (おまけ fragments; "Bonus: Fragments")

== Reception ==
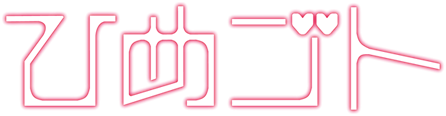
According to Matsuri, the anime Himegoto affected Shounen Princess's sales positively.

The series was well received by critics and was included in the Japanese publication Kono Manga ga Sugoi!'s monthly recommended manga feature. The publication liked how the series depicted the psychology of Nao as he gradually becomes more accustomed to femininity and dressing like a woman. Describing him as the main attraction of the story, they called him more attractive than the heroine and sexy in a way that could only happen in an otokonoko scenario. They also appreciated how the plot goes beyond just being a "reversed gender" scenario, instead being a more complex story about an average person growing and becoming a hero, but criticized the ending as feeling rushed and not resolving how Nao and Ahmad are hiding their genders, wishing for a continuation. Writer Naoki Miyamoto recommended the series, finding the scenario of Nao trying to learn how to behave femininely cute, and liked the series' twist on typical marriage scenarios.

The pop culture news site Akiba Blog reported that readers considered the story clever and cute and liked its use of romance and eroticism, and how it features both comedic and more serious sequences. They also liked its empathetic portrayal of its characters and its use of trans-esque themes in a story about marriage and national interests. According to Matsuri, sales of Shounen Princess were positively affected by the Niconico premiere of the anime adaptation of Norio Tsukudani's Himegoto, which also follows a male character dressing like a woman.
