= Saki Ono =

Japanese voice actress and singer

- 小野 早稀
- Born: 26 November 1990 (age 35); Tokyo, Japan
- Other name: Chansaki (ちゃんさき)
- Occupation: Voice actress
- Years active: 2013–present

Saki Ono (小野 早稀, Ono Saki; born 26 November 1990) is a Japanese voice actress from Tokyo who has featured in a number of television series, video games, radio performances and music releases. She was previously represented with Just Production. She was a member of voice acting unit I My Me Mine by Asahi Production.

== Biography ==
Her first starring role was in the 2015 television anime Onsen Yōsei Hakone-chan.

On 26 November 2016, on her Twitter account, she reported that she transferred to Just Production from Seinenza Theater Company Movie Broadcast. On 30 April 2019, she reported that she left Just Production.

== Personal life ==
Ono is friends with Yūki Kuwahara and comics artist and illustrator Norio Tsukudani. She is a big fan of Hiroshima Toyo Carp.

== Filmography ==
Bold denotes main characters.

=== TV anime ===
2013

Title	Role
Beyond the Boundary	Waitress
Day Break Illusion	Female student
No Matter How I Look at It, It's You Guys' Fault I'm Not Popular!	Baseball club manager

2014

Title	Role	Ref.
Himegoto	**Unko**	

2015

Title	Role	Ref.
Onsen Yōsei Hakone-chan	**Hakone-chan**	
Venus Project -Climax-	Romi Oze	
Funassyi no Funafunafuna Biyori	**Nyaossyi**	

2016

Title	Role	Ref.
Nazotokine	Aiko Nishikawa	

2017

Title	Role	Ref.
Kemono Friends	Common Raccoon, King Cobra	

2018

Title	Role	Ref.
Beatless	Yuka Endo	

2019

Title	Role	Ref.
Kemono Friends 2	Common Raccoon, Giant Pangolin	
Nori Pro	Ezomiya Milk	

=== Video games ===
2013

Title	Role	Ref.
Puella Magi Madoka Magica: The Battle Pentagram	Tsukaima / Witch / Student / Nurse	

2014

Title	Role	Ref.
Himegoto	**Shikinatsume Nekoya**	

2015

Title	Ref.
The Witcher 3: Wild Hunt	

2016

Title	Role	Ref.
Company Girls	**Claris Rigby**, **Aitana Felin**	
Suke Suzume Keiji	**Bridget Brillouin**, **Chieri Monobe**	
Mon Musume Harem	**Astel**, Chan	

2017

Title	Role	Ref.
Genkai Totsu-jō: Castle Panzers	**Mikoto Barcher**	
Fantasy Squad	Asila	
Himitsu no Yadoya	Delfin	
Dragon Genesis	Io	

2022

Title	Role	Ref.
Massage Freaks	**Mikuni Haruyama**	

=== Drama CD ===
2014

Title	Role
Maury to Ryū	**Chibi**

2017

Title	Role
Hen Onna	**Riri Momoki**

=== Dubbing ===
2021

Title	Role
My Little Pony: Friendship is Magic	**Cozy Glow**

=== Radio ===
Bold denotes it is currently broadcast. *Internet radio.

Dates	Title	Network	Notes	Ref.
2014	Shimo-ka Seito-kai no Himegoto Radio	Onsen*		
2015	Onsen Yōsei Hakone-chan Radio	Onsen*		
2016–	**Kemono Friends Radio!!**	HiBiKi Radio Station*		
7 Jul 2017 –	RCC Carp Niter Special Jingle	RCC	As Common raccoon from Kemono Friends	

=== TV programmes ===
Date	Title	Network	Notes	Ref.
Jun 2012	music ru		Opening theme	
7 Dec 2015	Anime Mashite	TX		
14 Apr 2017	Music Station	EX	As part of Dōbutsu Biscuits×PPP	

=== Stage ===
Dates	Title	Role	Location	Ref.
30 Jun – 31 Jul 2016	Legend of Funassyi	Caron (voice appearance)	DMM VR Theater	
14–18 Jun 2017	Kemono Friends	Common raccoon	Shinagawa Prince Hotel Club eX	

== Discography ==
=== Character songs ===
Release date	Product name	As	Song	Remarks
2017
8 Feb	Yōkoso Japari Park e	Dōbutsu Biscuits (Note: Common raccoon (Saki Ono), Serval cat (Yuka Ozaki), Fennec (Kana Motomiya))×PPP (Note: Rockhopper penguin (Aina Aiba), Humboldt penguin (Ikuko Chikuta), Royal penguin (Mikoi Sasaki), Emperor penguin (Ruka Nemoto), Gentoo penguin (Kyoka Tamura))	"Yōkoso Japari Park e"	TV anime Kemono Friend opening theme
7 Jun	"Kemono Friends" Drama & Character Song Album "Japari Café"	Dōbutsu Biscuits+Kaban (Aya Uchida)×PPP	"Kemono Parade –Japari Park Memorial–"	TV anime Kemono Friends related song
7 Jun	"Kemono Friends" Drama & Character Song Album "Japari Café"	Dōbutsu Biscuits+Kaban (Aya Uchida)×PPP	"Yōkoso Japari Park e (with Kaban)"	TV anime Kemono Friends related song
7 Jun	"Kemono Friends" Drama & Character Song Album "Japari Café"	Dōbutsu Biscuits	"Pop Step Frends"	TV anime Kemono Friends related song

== Participating units ==
- I My Me Mine – voice actress unit produced by Asahi Production.

Former

- Tartetatin – Along with Ayano Kametaka, debuted on 21 March 2012. Disbanded on 6 July 2012.
