= Oto Nyan =

Japanese manga magazine

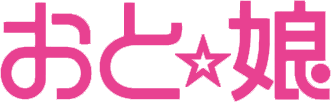

- Issue 9 cover art
- Categories: Manga
- Frequency: Quarterly
- First issue: October 25, 2010
- Final issue Number: May 25, 2013; 11
- Company: Million Publishing
- Country: Japan
- Language: Japanese
- Website: otonyan.jp

Oto Nyan (Japanese: おと☆娘(ニャン)) is a Japanese manga magazine, which was published quarterly by Million Publishing from October 25, 2010 to May 25, 2013, for 11 issues; for its final issue, it was rebranded Oto Nyan Omega (おと☆娘Ω). The manga in the magazine focus on male characters who cross-dress; the magazine also includes articles, interviews, and media reviews.

The Oto Nyan manga include both one-shots and series, and often have themes of gay male romance and eroticism; long-running series in the magazine include Ei Tachibana's You See, Teacher... and Hinaki's Amahara-kun+. A sister publication, Otokonoko Comic Anthology (オトコの娘コミックアンソロジー), was released from July 11, 2011 to April 15, 2013, and features cross-dressing manga on a given theme varying with each issue. Oto Nyan was well received and mainly competed with Ichijinsha's cross-dressing manga magazine Waai!.

== History ==
Oto Nyan was announced August 2010, and publisher Million Publishing launched its first issue on October 25, 2010, following behind Ichijinsha's similar magazine Waai!, which launched earlier that year. Issues of the magazine often came bundled with feminine clothing items intended for male readers to wear, which an Oto Nyan spokeswoman described as something to make the otokonoko fantasy more real for readers, and with items chosen based on what characters in the Oto Nyan manga often wear; these included knee socks, a hair pin, a swimsuit, a lingerie set, and a plaid miniskirt.

The magazine was released quarterly, and was initially 207 pages long; with volume 8, the magazine was expanded by over a hundred pages, to 323, and added several new serialized manga, along with a redesign and slight price reduction. A sister publication, Otokonoko Comic Anthology, was published from July 11, 2011 to April 15, 2013, with each issue featuring manga one-shots on a given theme; for example, volume 1 features stories that are all about male characters cross-dressing because they are forced to by others. The Oto Nyan book Josō Shōnen Game Taizen 2009–2011 (Note: Josō Shōnen Game Taizen 2009–2011 (女装少年 ゲーム大全 2009~2011, "Cross-Dressing Guys Video Game Encyclopedia 2009–2011")) was released on August 29, 2011, and features reviews and coverage of video games from 2009–2011 that feature otokonoko characters.

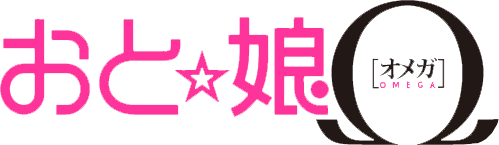
The magazine was rebranded Oto Nyan Omega for its final issue.

For the main magazine's eleventh issue, it was rebranded Oto Nyan Omega, but put on hiatus after its release on May 25, 2013; the editorial department wrote that they were hoping to be able to bring Oto Nyan back in some form in the future, and asked readers to follow the magazine's website and social media for updates. Several of the manga published in Oto Nyan and Otokonoko Comic Anthology were later re-released in collected tankōbon volumes; some of these have in turn been published in English.

== Content ==
Oto Nyan published manga one-shots and series about cross-dressing male characters and otokonoko, often with themes of gay male romance and eroticism. In addition to the manga, the magazine includes feature articles, interviews, reviews of anime, video games, and novels with cross-dressing male characters, and illustration galleries. Some issues include audio drama CDs, including a two-volume drama where characters voiced by Rino Kawashima and Hikaru Isshiki hypnotize a male point-of-view character to make him wear women's clothes.

=== Manga ===
==== Series ====
Manga series published in Oto Nyan
Years	#	Title	Creator	Premise	Ref.
2010–2011	1–2	♂ Docchi ♀ (♂どっち♀)	Ryuya Kamino	Tsukasa must cross-dress and serve as the student council president's maid as punishment.	
2010–2012	1–6	Otomegokoro (?) no Jiyuukei (乙女心(？)の自由形)	Wataru Akizuki	Akira Kobayakawa must cross-dress and join a female idol group to repay a favor.	
2010–2013	1–7, 9–10	You See, Teacher... (先生あのね。, Sensei Anone.)	Ei Tachibana	Nakamura, a feminine student at an all-male school, is attracted to his teacher Kakenshi. Note: released in English by Project H.	
2010–2012	1–3, 8	Sensei no Boku (せんせいのぼく)	Hinaki	Yuu's girlfriend, the dominant teacher Kyouko, forces him to cross-dress.	
2010, 2012	1, 6–9	Spilled Milk (あとのまつり, Ato no Matsuri)	Mitohi Matsumoto	Ikumi is chosen to cross-dress and kiss his friends due to how none of them have girlfriends. Note: titled Kanojo? to Shitai 10 no Koto! (カノジョ？としたい10のコト!) in volume 6–9. Released in English by Project H.	
2011–2012	3, 5, 8	Actress (アクトレス)	Mitohi Matsumoto	Yuta Tsuyama falls in love with cross-dressing actor Chisato Hidaka thinking he is a woman, and gets cast as a female extra in a film when seeking him out. Note: released in English by Project H.	
2011–2013	3, 8–11	Josou Sanmyaku (女装山脈)	Hajime Nishida (author), Penta Aogiri (artist)	During a stormy mountaineering trip, Ikuto seeks shelter in a village where three otokonoko live. Note: adaptation of the visual novel game Tomgirls of the Mountains.	
2011–2013	3, 5–10	Miki no Houkago (ミキの放課後)	Chita Tsumura	Itsuki helps his fellow student Miki cross-dress in secret.	
2011–2013	4–10	Amahara-kun+ (あまはら君+)	Hinaki	The cross-dresser Amahara makes other men begin wearing women's clothes too.	
2011–2012	4–9	Shitsuji de Maid na Otokonoko (執事でメイドなおとこのコ)	Yukako	The bodyguard Yuuri must dress as a maid to join his boss Asahina to a women-only meeting.	
2011–2013	5–11	Kagayaku‼ Otokonoko Juku (煌‼ 男の娘塾)	Wadapen	Akira Miyashita must dress like a woman to become manga artist Tsurugi Amara's apprentice.	
2012–2013	8–11	Cherry Garden (チェリーガーデン)	Kazumi Umekawa	Mayumi is accidentally registered as female due to his feminine name, and must attend school as a woman.	
2012–2013	8–10	Iincho wa ♂ (いいんちょは♂)	Sugar	Sanae Tachibana flirts with his classmate Satou while cross-dressing.	
2012–2013	8–10	Imōto (Otōto) Kissa Hajimemashita. (妹（弟）喫茶はじめました。)	Kira Tome	A male employee at a coffee shop must cross-dress as a waitress for work.	
2012–2013	8–10	Kami Yome ♂ Desu Kedo! (神嫁♂ですけどっ!)	Kuromame	Follows male, cross-dressing yōkai.	
2012–2013	8–11	Otokonoko Lovers‼ (オトコの娘ラヴァーズ‼)	Gorou Yoshida	Manabu, an otokonoko manga enthusiast, meets others like him.	
2012–2013	8–11	Urafu. Youkoso Urafuki Iinkai e (うらふ～。ようこそ裏風紀委員へ)	Benjamin	A student cross-dresses for a sting operation for his school's morality committee.	
2013	10–11	Chikage-chan Black (ちかげちゃんブラック)	Mitohi Matsumoto	The cross-dresser Chikage and another student both want to be student council president.	
2013	10–11	Dakara Boku wa Imōto X Otōto ni Koi o Suru (だから僕は妹×弟に恋をする)	Wataru Akizuki	A young man thinks his cross-dressing brother is cute.	

==== One-shots ====
Manga one-shots published in Oto Nyan
Year	#	Title	Creator	Premise	Ref.
2010	1	Boku mo Kitto (ボクもきっと)	Wadapen	Follows a cross-dresser who likes being cute.	
2010	1	Cosmos (コスモス)	Naoki Matsumura	A person who likes wearing women's clothes questions their gender identity.	
2010	1	Karen ni Musashi (可憐にムサシ)	Muunii Mucchiri	The maid café cook Musashi Ichimonji must cross-dress as a waitress due to staff shortages.	
2010	1	Mahou Bloomers (魔法ブルマ)	Seihoukei	Aki's sister tricks him into cross-dressing while running a marathon.	
2010	1	A Steamy Otokonoko (ゆけむりオトコの娘, Yukemuri Otokonoko)	Kuromame	Kazuma visits a unisex hot spring and flirts with the cross-dresser Chihiro thinking that he is a woman. Note: Released in English by Project H.	
2011	2	An Angel's Flight (天使の放物線(パラボラ), Tenshi no Parabora)	Mitohi Matsumoto	Yuu Kawazoe falls into the river when hit by a baseball, and, mistaken for a woman, must wear a cheerleader uniform while his clothes dry. Note: Released in English by Project H.	
2011	2	Chocolate de Cousin	Maatan	Kou meets his cousin Hiroki for the first time in six years, who now dresses like a woman.	
2011	2	A Deep Kiss from a Certain Nurse (とあるナースの熱烈検温(ディープキッス), Toaru Nurse no Deep Kiss)	Kuromame	Shibano is hospitalized and assigned a cross-dressing male nurse. Note: released in English by Project H.	
2011	2	Koda-kun to Nozomi-senpai (香田クンとのぞみ先輩)	Muunii Mucchiri	Koda must cross-dress as punishment for spilling a drink on his senpai Nozomi's documents.	
2011	2	Prologue	Wadapen	Bullies force a male student to cross-dress, and he realizes that he likes it.	
2011	2	Sakura Saku (サクラサク)	Naoki Matsumura	A boy starts wearing a girls' school uniform when beginning middle school.	
2011	3	Boku wa Kimi no Kanojo ni Naritai (香田クンとのぞみ先輩)	Muunii Mucchiri	A male student is molested on the train but is saved by a cross-dresser.	
2011	3	Class Buntan: Otokonoko!? (クラス分担：おとこのこ!?)	Seihoukei	Due to the gender imbalance of Ihiko's class of 20 male students and 18 female students, he is redesignated as female, and must cross-dress and attend school as a woman from then on.	
2011	3	Confession (告白, Kokuhaku)	Kuromame	The teacher at a school for nuns is told by one nun in the confessional that he is a cross-dressing man.	
2011	3	Ribbon	Wadapen	A young man is caught trying on his sister's hair ribbon.	
2011	4	Leo and the Night Sky of Summer (獅子座のボクと夏の夜空, Shishiza no Boku to Natsu no Yozora)	Mitohi Matsumoto	The astronomy club president makes Fumizuki cosplay as female alien characters to bait a UFO; succeeding, Fumizuki is probed by aliens researching otokonoko. Note: released in English by Project H.	
2011	4	Natsu da! Hanabi da! Otokonoko ni wa Yukata da! (夏だ！花火だ！おとこのこには浴衣だ！)	Seihoukei	Yuuha's girlfriend Yuki makes him cross-dress for the summer festival.	
2011	4	Before and After the School Swimsuit (スク水ビフォーアフター, Sukusui Before After)	Kuromame	Okada must wear a women's swimsuit to learn how to swim. Note: Released in English by Project H.	
2011	4	Skirt	Wadapen	A male student loses a bet with a female classmate and must wear her clothes, but ends up liking it.	
2011	4	Yakusoku (約束)	Chita Tsumura	A man's brother likes cross-dressing and kissing boys.	
2011	5	Magical Ear Pick Panic (Magical耳かきパニック, Magical Mimikaki Panic)	Kuromame	Rui who must cross-dress as part of a scientific experiment. Note: released in English by Project H.	
2011	5	Shuugaku Ryokou no Yoru (修学旅行の夜)	Seihoukei	Nodoka's cross-dressing classmate Shizuku flirts with him at the hot spring.	
2011	5	Warera Nishizaki Kiba Gundan (われら西崎騎馬軍団)	Maatan	Nishizaki accidentally brings his sister's gym clothes for the school's sports day, and must participate wearing them.	
2012	6	Setsubun Kaanibaru (SETSUBUNかぁにばる)	Maatan	Due to a model canceling in the last minute, Subaru must take her place in a bikini contest.	
2012	6	The Striped Panties of Destiny (運命の縞パン, Unmei no Shimapan)	Kuromame	Kazuki is introduced to women's clothes by his sister's cross-dressing friend Haru. Note: Released in English by Project H.	
2012	7	Datte Kawaii nda mon! (だって可愛いんだモン！)	Gorou Yoshida	Aikawa cross-dresses because he wants to be a girl.	
2012	7	Harukaze (はるかぜ)	Hiroshi Yamazaki	Michiharu realizes he likes wearing skirts after his sister dresses him like a girl.	
2012	7	Mannequin-san, Sekimen Chuu! (マネキンさん、赤面中！)	Kuromame	Nao is a male employee at a clothing store, and must model women's fashion.	
2012	7	Motenai (モテない)	Seihoukei	Sakata asks Yamauchi how to be popular with girls, and gets a demonstration where he, cross-dressing, plays the part of the girl.	
2012	8	Himegoto (ひめごと)	Yuu Uonuma	A young man gets a feminine make-over.	
2012	8	Kagami no Naka no Watashi (鏡の中の私)	Wataru Akizuki	Satoshi cross-dresses in the hope that his sister will like him better as a girl.	
2012	8	UV Guard 120% (UVが～ど120％)	Maatan	A cross-dresser wears a women's swimsuit under his T-shirt.	
2012	9	Boku no Imouto ni (僕の妹に)	Wataru Akizuki	Follows a cross-dresser who others think is a woman.	
2012	9	Tadaima Nama Haishin Chu (ただいま生配信chu)	Maatan	A young man runs cross-dressing live streams.	
2013	10	Boku no Kanojo no Skirt Ka Jijō (僕の彼女のスカート下事情)	Yukako	A young man tries on his girlfriend's skirt.	
2013	10	Kokuhaku (コクハク)	Shiho Aichi	A man dates a cross-dresser thinking he is a woman, but does not mind when learning the truth.	
2013	11	Josoashi (じょそあし)	Gorou Yoshida	Yonkoma comedy about cross-dressing.	
2013	11	Tosho-Shitsu no Kanojo (図書室の彼女)	Naoya Kaneko	Follows a cross-dresser on the library committee.	

== Reception ==
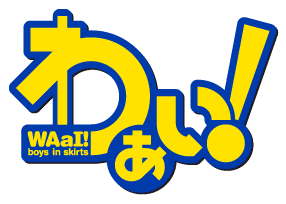
Oto Nyan competed with the magazine Waai!.

Natalie found it exciting to see Oto Nyan launch and how it broadened the otokonoko scene. They described it as a magazine that constantly drew the spotlight due to the unusual items bundled with the issues, fighting for attention with the major competing cross-dressing manga magazine Waai!, which bundled cosmetics products with its issues. Pop culture news site Akiba Blog appreciated Oto Nyan's slightly bigger focus on eroticism compared to Waai! and found that it made the magazine stand out. Reviewing My Cute Crossdresser, a collection of several of Mitohi Matsumoto's manga from the magazine, Bleeding Cool recommended them to readers who like "bulges, a little bondage, and dudes kissing other dudes when they're dressed up as girls", finding Leo and the Night Sky of Summer the most interesting.
