= Waai! =

Japanese manga magazine

- Volume 4 cover, with art by Akira Kasukabe
- Editor-in-chief: Toshinaga Hijikata
- Categories: Manga
- Frequency: Quarterly
- Format: JB5
- First issue: April 24, 2010 (special); February 25, 2011 (stand-alone)
- Final issue Number: February 25, 2014; 16
- Company: Ichijinsha
- Country: Japan
- Based in: Tokyo
- Language: Japanese
- Website: www.ichijinsha.co.jp/waai/

Waai! (Japanese: わぁい！; "Wow!", stylized "WAaI!") is a Japanese manga magazine which was published by Ichijinsha from April 24, 2010 to February 25, 2014, for 16 issues. The manga in Waai! focus on male characters who engage in cross-dressing, willingly or due to circumstance; the magazine also includes articles, interviews, and reviews. Its sister magazine Waai! Mahalo (わぁい！Mahalo) was published for 6 issues from April 25, 2012 to December 25, 2013, and only contains manga.

The main magazine started as a special issue of the publisher's Monthly Comic Rex, before getting spun out as a separate publication. The creation of the magazine was pushed for by its editor-in-chief, Toshinaga Hijikata, a cross-dresser and writer of books about cross-dressing, who aimed to create a magazine with wider appeal than the more sexual cross-dressing magazines that came before it.

Manga featured in the magazines include one-shots and series, which often combine the cross-dressing conceit with themes of gay male romance and societal rules of femininity; among the serializations are Dicca Suemitsu's Reversible! (2010–2013), Rika Kamiyoshi's Sazanami Cherry (2010–2011), and Norio Tsukudani's Himegoto (2011–2014), the latter of which saw an anime adaptation in 2014. At first the magazine was primarily popular with male audiences, but it gradually also built a female following, which by late 2011 represented about a third of its readership.

== History ==
Waai! began on April 24, 2010 as a special issue of publisher Ichijinsha's manga magazine Monthly Comic Rex with a focus on otokonoko, after being teased at Comiket in December 2009. The special drew a lot of attention, leading to it being continued as a Monthly Comic Rex special for two more volumes, before being spun out into a stand-alone magazine with the launch of volume 4 on February 25, 2011. The magazine's editor-in-chief Toshinaga Hijikata was a driving force behind its creation, being a cross-dresser, a reader of otokonoko fiction, and a writer of books about cross-dressing. According to Hijikata, the proposal to create the magazine went smoothly as Ichijinsha had noticed the popularity of cross-dressing fiction. The rest of the magazine's editorial staff were also otokonoko enthusiasts. The artist Akira Kasukabe provided many illustrations for the magazine's covers and for its short stories; other interior artists included Maki Makita, Usagi Yuki, Penta Aogiri, Yuki Ameto, and Yuu Ueda.

The magazine was printed in a JB5 182 mm × 257 mm (7.2 in × 10.1 in) paper format and was published on a quarterly basis. Starting with Reversible! and Sazanami Cherry in 2011, some of the manga featured in the magazine have also been published in collected tankōbon volumes; the two were chosen for being the Waai! manga standing out the most and representing the magazine. Because of the cross-dressing themes in the manga published in Waai!, the magazine staff took special care when designing the covers for the collected volumes, to avoid readers feeling too embarrassed to bring a copy to the checkout in the bookstore, but also used cross-dressing photo models in the marketing for the volumes. A sister magazine focusing solely on manga, Waai! Mahalo, launched on April 25, 2012, and ran for six volumes until December 25, 2013. Like with the main magazine, Kasukabe provided the cover art.

The main Waai! magazine continued until the release of volume 16 on February 25, 2014, after which it was put on an indefinite hiatus, with the editorial staff advising readers to follow the magazine's social media for any potential future updates. Hijikata apologized for the lack of prior warning, saying that it was a sudden development, but that the collected editions of the manga run in the magazine would continue as planned, as would the production of the anime adaptation of the Waai! manga Himegoto. On June 23, 2014, Ichijinsha published the artbook Paramitta (ぱらみった), collecting Kasukabe's art pieces from the magazine.

== Content ==
Waai! and Waai! Mahalo published manga series and one-shots about otokonoko and about male characters engaging in cross-dressing. Although the magazines focused on the manga, the main magazine also contains other features about cross-dressing, including coverage and reviews of anime, manga, and video games with otokonoko or cross-dressing themes, how-to articles about cross-dressing, short stories, interviews, pictures of male models wearing women's clothes, and a section called "Otokonoko Land" with letters from readers. In contrast to other more sexual cross-dressing magazines, Hijikata intended for the magazine to be accessible for a broader audience, while still at times featuring elements of eroticism.

To appeal to a broad range of cross-dressing fiction enthusiasts, the magazine tried to vary the type of stories it ran, with some featuring characters who actively enjoy cross-dressing, and some with characters who are forced to cross-dress through the situation they find themselves in. The stories are frequently also themed around gay male romance and initiations into societal rules around femininity.

=== Manga ===
==== Waai! ====
Manga published in Waai!
Release	Vol.	Title	Creator	Format	Premise	Ref.
2010	1	Nonono	Reku Fuyunagi	One-shot	The cross-dresser Nono's lesbian friend Sei helps him be more feminine.	(Note: Sources for Waai! appearances: Issue 1, 2, 3, 4, 5, 6, 7, 8, 9, 10, 11, 12, 13, 14, 15, 16)
2010–2011	1–7	Onnanoko Tokidoki Otokonoko	Notari Hinemotsu	Series	Yuusuke meets his childhood friend Akira, who now wears women's clothes.	
2010–2013	1–15	Reversible!	Dicca Suemitsu	Series	Shuu Kaidou transfers to an all-male school where students must dress like women.	
2010–2011	1–6	Sazanami Cherry	Rika Kamiyoshi	Series	Kazuhiro Migiwa confesses his love to the cross-dresser Ren, thinking he is a woman.	
2010–2014	1–16	The Secret Devil-chan	Emu	Series	Sou Kurosaki summons the feminine, male demon Kogure. Note: published in English by Digital Manga.	
2010–2012	1–8	Suzunone: Wakaokami? Funtouki	Hako Hitsuji	Series	Ryoto must cross-dress to work as a hostess at his family's inn when his sister refuses.	
2010	2	Onna no Buki ga Tsukaete Koso Otokonoko desu.	Yuu Ueda	One-shot	A cross-dresser uses his femininity to convince his brother to get a haircut.	
2010–2013	2–12	Past Future	Tsukasa Takatsuki	Series	Kako Akari borrows and wears his sister Mirai's clothes, to her displeasure.	
2010	3	Fuwa Kyun	Hyuura Konata	One-shot	Kae wants to be surrounded by women, so she makes her butler Haraguchi cross-dress.	
2010	3	Mayo Elle Otokonoko	Pop	One-shot	Follows cross-dressing students. Prologue to the original video animation of the same name.	
2011–2014	4, 7–16	Otasuke Miko Miko-chan	Hiroichi	Series	Ayumu Mikoshiba must as an only child continue his family's magical girl tradition.	
2011	5	Kindan no Mama ni	Muranako	One-shot	A cross-dressing male student attends an all-female school.	
2011	5	Yomi ♂	Zenzai Yoshihira	One-shot	Usagi Mitsuki accidentally promises to marry a male deity, believing he is a woman.	
2011	6	Tintin Cheer	Hideyu Tougarashi	One-shot	A student at an all-male school must cross-dress to be a cheerleader.	
2011	6	♂ Yorishiro ♀	Muranako	One-shot	Follows cross-dressing ghost hunters.	
2011	7	Boku no Otouto no Kawaisa wa Ijou	Gorou Yoshida	One-shot	The cross-dresser Yuuki's brother tries cross-dressing to understand why Yuuki likes it.	
2011	7	Hikaru to Hikari	Getsu Takebayashi	Series	Hikaru's neighbor Aya gets him to cross-dress and participate in a singing contest for women. Bonus chapter of the series run in Waai! Mahalo.	
2011–2014	7–16	Himegoto	Norio Tsukudani	Series	Yonkoma about Hime Arikawa, who due to a debt must cross-dress until graduating. Adapted into anime.	
2011	7	Tomodachi Nanka Iranai	Reku Fuyunagi	One-shot	Follow-up to Nonono.	
2011	7	Tutor Maid	Yuki Ameto	One-shot	Yuuki Narusawa is hired as a tutor, and must wear lingerie and a maid outfit for work.	
2012–2014	8–16	Boku to Boku	Futago Minazuki	Series	The cross-dresser Junichirou Izumi is saved from a molester by Yuuki Kimino.	
2012–2013	8–13	Otokonoko Days	Asuka Kanan	Series	Shuusei's cross-dressing friend Hinata gets him to begin wearing women's clothes.	
2012–2014	8–16	Taboo Quartette	Muranako	Series	Tomoe is a male heir to a family tradition of shrine maidens.	
2012	9	Oshiire kara Ai o Komete	Ayame Nagi	One-shot	Haruka's closet is home to a cross-dressing male zashiki-warashi spirit.	
2012	10	Omaera Minna Damasareteiru!	Airi Mori	One-shot	Soutarou Yamazaki's friend Kirika Tachibana must attend school in women's clothes without anyone realizing he is not a woman, or be forced to join a theater group.	
2012–2013	10–15	Oneechan ga Mamotte Ageru!	Sora Yoshino	Series	Kairi Shinonome's brother Anri has been dressing like a girl since childhood, and goes to an idol audition. Follow-up to Change Idol.	
2013	11	Dousei Chuu‼	Benny's	One-shot	Shinya has cousins who cross-dress. Continued from Josou Shounen Anthology Comic.	
2013	11	Mise Moi!	Red Kamaboko	One-shot	Hiro dislikes the shamelessness of his cross-dressing neighbors Akira and Suguru.	
2013	12	Ore to Fuuki Iin no.	Airi Mori	One-shot	Riku Kurata must live as a woman due to issues relating to succession after his father remarries.	
2013–2014	12–13, 15–16	Super Family Complete	Red Kamaboko	Series	Mirin Asami dislikes cross-dressing, but his three brothers like it.	
2013	13	Damatte Watashi no Iu Koto Kikinasai!	Airi Mori	One-shot	Kanata Tsukishiro's dead sister's spirit frequently possesses him to make him cross-dress and romantically pursue a male classmate.	
2013	14	Hanazawa-kun wa, Hanikanda.	Naoya Kaneko	One-shot	Hanazawa acts drastically different when wearing women's clothes.	
2013	14	Nise Shōjo Sentai Q	Red Kamaboko	One-shot	Hiyoko joins an all-male hero club which fights evil while dressed like tokusatsu superheroines.	
2013–2014	14–16	Zettai Fukujuu Game	Peke	Series	Kotarou Hayasaka's all-male school's student council makes all students wear women's clothes.	
2013	15	Immoral Josochology	Naoya Kaneko	One-shot	Follows a student with a focus on his identity as a cross-dresser.	
2014	16	Boku no Geboku ni Nare!	Assa	Series	Rion Tachibana suspects that Yukinari Takase knows that Rion secretly is a cross-dressing man rather than a woman. Continued from Waai! Mahalo.	
2014	16	Hanazawa-kun wa, Kakenuketa.	Naoya Kaneko	One-shot	Follow-up to Hanazawa-kun wa, Hanikanda.	

==== Waai! Mahalo ====
Manga published in Waai! Mahalo
Release	Vol.	Title	Creator	Format	Premise	Ref.
2012–2013	1–6	Boku wa Senpai ni Josou o Shiirareteimasu.	Kotaro Shono	Series	Wataru's senpai Ayane Takamura forces him to wear women's clothes.	(Note: Sources for Waai! Mahalo appearances: Issue 1, 2, 3, 4, 5, 6)
2012–2013	1	Change Idol	Sora Yoshino	One-shot	Nanami Kousaka wants to be an idol but is rejected due to his cuteness, so his producer Kouichi Kitami makes him debut as a woman.	
2012	1–2	Chuu x2 Trap	Kurena Minakami	Series	The lesbian woman Minori Takasaki becomes the target of a cross-dressing vampire.	
2012	1	Kasukabe Koukou Josou-bu	Sakuya Yuuki	Series	Akira Komukai attends a cross-dressing club. Continued from Josou Shounen Anthology Comic.	
2012–2013	1–5	Motto! Himitsu no Akuma-chan	Emu	Series	Spin-off from The Secret Devil-chan.	
2012	1	Onnanoko Kenkyuukai	Beru Okabayashi	One-shot	Yuuma Yamabuki must wear women's clothes to help Laira, a student at an all-female school.	
2012–2013	1–3, 5–6	Porte Tricolore	Seri Minase	Series	Brothers Rio, Noa, and Rei were raised as girls, and live in a world where otokonoko can use magic.	
2012	1	Re:Volutions	Ryouko Amami	One-shot	Follows a cross-dressing swordsman.	
2012	1–2	Suzunone: Wakaokami? Funtouki: After	Hako Hitsuji	Series	Follow-up to Suzunone: Wakaokami? Funtouki.	
2012	2	Hatsukoi Lovers	Ayune Araragi	One-shot	Mamori Kusunoki's cross-dressing friend Wakaba Kisaki is attracted to him.	
2012–2013	2–6	Hikaru to Hikari	Getsu Takebayashi	Series	Hikaru's neighbor Aya makes him cross-dress and participate in a singing contest for women.	
2012–2013	2–6	Himegoto+	Norio Tsukudani	Series	Spin-off from Himegoto, about Hime's cross-dressing brother Kaguya.	
2012	2	Narcissus Tomo-chan	Yoshino	One-shot	Tomo Fukuya loves taking pictures of himself while cross-dressing.	
2012–2013	2, 4–6	Onnanoko Play	Notari Hinemosu	Series	Junichi Sasaki must cross-dress for female roles in the drama club.	
2012	2–3	Twins Game	Ryou Kurashina (writer), Miyabi Hasaki (artist)	Series	Follows a brother and sister who both cross-dress.	
2012	3	Kiratto! Yell	Airi Mori	One-shot	Yuuto joins a male cheer squad expecting it to be manly, but the members dress like female cheerleaders.	
2012	3	Onii-chan Complex	Ayune Araragi	One-shot	Haruki's brother Natsuki keeps visiting him in school while cross-dressing.	
2012	3	Ruru Chouchou	Nami Nishiuri	One-shot	Sorano is a cross-dresser in feudal Japan.	
2012–2013	3–5	Family Complete	Red Kamaboko	Series	Follows cross-dressing families.	
2012–2013	3–4	Tadashii Ace no Kouryakuhou	Mitohi Matsumoto	Series	Baseball player Hiroto Fujiki has a cross-dressing groupie; and team manager Ayumu Tsumori follows a book's advice to cross-dress to motivate his team. Continued in Monthly Comic Rex.	
2013	4–6	Boku no Geboku ni Nare!	Assa	Series	Rion Tachibana suspects that Yukinari Takase knows that Rion secretly is a cross-dressing man rather than a woman. Continued in Waai!.	
2013	4	Boku to Boku	Futago Minazuki	Series	Bonus chapter of the series run in Waai!.	
2013	4	Houkago, 2-C no Kyoushitsu de.	Ayune Araragi	One-shot	Yuuto Sasaki is a cross-dressing student who is attracted to his teacher Sasaki Tsukimori.	
2013	5	Ore ga XX de Model Debut!?	Shiki Kazutoki	One-shot	Koutarou Asama is an aspiring male model who is unwittingly hired to model women's fashion.	
2013	5	Present Koukan wa Kiken na Kaori...!?	Ayune Araragi	One-shot	The cross-dressing characters from Hatsukoi Lovers, Onii-chan Complex, and Houkago, 2-C no Kyoushitsu de. exchange Christmas presents.	
2013	6	Boku ga Otouto to Nakayoku Naru Houhou	Shiki Kazutoki	One-shot	Haruki cross-dresses to reconnect with his brother.	
2013	6	Hataraite Kudasai, Haruko-sensei!	Hyaku Fujishiro	One-shot	The teacher Haruko Sakurai has her students try cross-dressing.	
2013	6	Majo-san to Issho	Red Kamaboko	One-shot	A monster-slaying witch hires a cross-dressing male witch as a bodyguard.	

== Reception ==
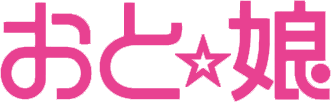
Waai! was leading in its niche, and led to the launch of the later magazine Oto Nyan.

The first issue of Waai! drew a lot of attention through its focus on male-to-female cross-dressing and was a commercial success, selling well enough to prompt a second printing. Although its main target demographic was men – many of whom were cross-dressers or wanted to cross-dress – Hijikata noted that they also wanted to attract female readers; for the first issue, the vast majority of Waai!'s readers were male, but the amount of female readers grew with each new issue, and by October 2011, about a third of its readers were women. At that time, the average Waai! reader was in their 20s. It was the leading magazine within the cross-dressing manga niche and was considered to have paved the way for the later cross-dressing magazine Oto Nyan, although the publisher did not divulge the circulation figures.

Japanese entertainment news site Natalie thought that the cross-dressing characters in the Waai! manga were cute and specifically found Reversible! and Sazanami Cherry to be the foundation that the magazine rested on, standing out among the rest of the manga and diversifying the magazine's content. Himegoto was another popular series, with both Hime and Kaguya appearing in the results of a 2016 Goo Rankings survey of the most popular otokonoko characters in Japan. Jonathan Clements, writing for Neo, found Waai!'s conceptualization of femininity too overtly consumerist and materialistic, describing it as that of a beautician's, and considered the manga stories aside from the cross-dressing themes to often be all-male-cast retreads of old manga conceits. However, he found it difficult to criticize the magazine's motives without inadvertently also criticizing cross-dressers' lifestyles. Da Vinci found the magazine comprehensive, with its combination of entertainment and how-to guides, and still found it an "indispensable magazine" for cross-dressers and cross-dressing enthusiasts by 2017. Yuricon founder Erica Friedman posted a eulogy to the magazine after its discontinuation, speaking to the frustration of a magazine or serialized manga shutting down as publishers fail to draw new readers in.
