= Reversible! =

2010 manga by Dicca Suemitsu

- Volume 1 cover, featuring Shuu Kaidou (left) and Tsubaki Yaezaki

リバーシブル！ (Ribāshiburu!)
- Genre: Romance
- Manga
- Written by: Dicca Suemitsu
- Published by: Ichijinsha
- Imprint: Waai! Comics
- Magazine: Waai!
- Original run: April 24, 2010 – November 25, 2013
- Volumes: 3

Reversible! (Japanese: リバーシブル！, Hepburn: Ribāshiburu!) is an otokonoko romance manga series created by Dicca Suemitsu. It was originally serialized by Ichijinsha in their magazine Waai! from April 24, 2010, to November 25, 2013, and has since also been collected in three tankōbon volumes. Together with Sazanami Cherry, it was the first manga published under the Waai! Comics imprint.

The story follows Shuu Kaidou, who has to transfer to an all-male school that requires its students to take turns wearing women's clothing, a rule in place to promote positive relationships between men and women. He is confused by this but is helped by the cross-dressing coordination committee member Tsubaki Yaezaki. The series was written with themes of male gay romance, change, and male femininity, with a focus on how the characters are affected by dressing like women. It was well received, considered to stand out both among the manga published in Waai! and among cross-dressing manga more broadly.

== Premise ==
Reversible! is an otokonoko romance manga set in St. Stokesia Academy, a Japanese all-male school which mandates that its students – half of them at a time – take turns wearing women's clothing, alternating every week. This rule is in place to encourage positive relationships between men and women despite the all-male environment. Shuu Kaidou, a student at another school, is bullied and eventually framed for a crime by three women, and as a result has to transfer to St. Stokesia. He is confused by and unhappy with the mandated cross-dressing but gets help from the experienced cross-dresser Tsubaki Yaezaki, a student on the school's cross-dressing coordination committee. Tsubaki gradually introduces Shuu to wearing feminine clothing and living as a woman, and he begins to enjoy it.

== Production and release ==
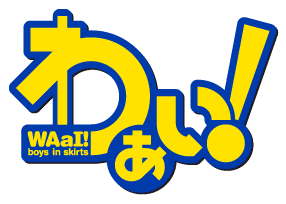
Waai!'s staff saw Reversible! as representative of the magazine.

Reversible! was written and illustrated by Dicca Suemitsu, and was serialized by Ichijinsha in Japanese in their cross-dressing manga magazine Waai!. It premiered on April 24, 2010, in the magazine's first issue, and ran until November 25, 2013. The series ended when it did because of the magazine's cancellation with the following issue, and although Suemitsu was happy with the ending, he wondered where the series could have gone had he been able to continue writing it.

When writing the manga, Suemitsu used themes of male gay romance, change, and male femininity, with a focus on how Shuu and the people around him are affected by dressing like women: Shuu goes from being forced to wear women's clothing to doing so willingly, and the cross-dressing is eventually depicted as positive for him. The forced aspect of the cross-dressing was also seen as important due to the slight eroticism it adds.

Ichijinsha has collected the series in three tankōbon volumes, which together with Sazanami Cherry were both the first manga released under the Waai! Comics imprint and the first Waai! manga to see a collected release. The two series were chosen for this as Waai!'s editor-in-chief Toshinaga Hijikata considered them the most distinctive and representative of their manga. Because of the cross-dressing theme, the magazine staff focused on ensuring that the cover artwork for the collected volumes would not cause embarrassment for potential customers and cause them to avoid bringing a copy to the book store check-out. At some retailers, the collected volumes were bundled with art prints depicting the series' characters wearing their feminine school uniforms and party dresses. The series has also been published in Chinese by Tong Li Publishing starting in 2014.

=== Volumes ===
No.	Release date	ISBN
1	October 20, 2011	978-4758012423
Chapter 1–5
After being framed for a crime by three women who bully him, Shuu Kaidou has to transfer to the all-male St. Stokesia Academy, where he is told by the principal that the students are required to take turns living and dressing like women. Shuu is unenthused, but Tsubaki Yaezaki, a student on the cross-dressing coordination committee, helps him with his feminine school uniform while flirting with him. The next day, Tsubaki teaches Shuu about make-up, and he meets his roommate Touma Matsuyuki and his classmate Aoi Natsume, both of whom flirt with him. Aoi and Shuu form a study group, and Shuu borrows a skirt to wear outside school. Shuu ponders how he enjoys feeling cute and how he acts differently while cross-dressing, and after seeing two students kissing, wonders about romance at an all-male school.
2	December 20, 2012	978-4758012836
Chapter 6–10
Shuu buys his own feminine clothes, and Touma teaches him about coordinating outfits. Touma is sexually harassed by other students for his femininity and homosexuality and almost sexually assaulted, but his friends save him. Enjoying feeling cute and feminine, Shuu wears women's clothes throughout the summer break despite not having to. When Shuu and Aoi help the principal sort documents, they learn that he too is a cross-dressing man, not a woman as they had thought, and that he took up cross-dressing because of his androphobic childhood friend Koharu, Tsubaki's mother. While walking back to their rooms, Aoi confesses his love to Shuu through the indirect Japanese declaration of love "the moon is beautiful, isn't it?" (月が綺麗ですね, tsuki ga kirei desu ne), but Shuu does not understand it, and Aoi chooses not to bring it up again.
3	February 20, 2014	978-4758013604
Chapter 11–15
Shuu wishes he and Tsubaki could be together forever, but Tsubaki tells him that he no longer needs help, and that he should stop being in charge of him as a cross-dressing coordination committee member. Aoi and Touma talk with Shuu about how Tsubaki dislikes being romantically pursued just for his looks, and how they think he is distancing himself from Shuu for fear of that. Shuu explains to Tsubaki how he respects him and joins the coordination committee. During a test of courage, Shuu and Tsubaki fall down a cliff and talk about their relationship while awaiting help. They visit Shuu's hometown during the winter break and encounter the women who framed him. They bully him for having "become a woman" and press him for money by threatening to take pictures of him in women's clothes, but he stands up to them, having grown through his time with Tsubaki. Time passes, and Shuu is shown living alone in the city after having graduated. He meets Tsubaki at a mixer, who now studies to be a stylist, and they reconnect.

== Reception ==
Reversible! was well received by readers, and Suemitsu still regularly saw royalties for the e-book edition by 2018; he said in 2019 that he frequently received requests for international releases of the series, but that it was up to publishers to determine whether to pursue that. It was also well received by critics: Honcierge called it one of the best manga in its genre, and Bukumaru considered it a "must-read" otokonoko manga.

Neo considered the core conceit of the school-mandated cross-dressing odd but found the manga to stand out from typical cross-dressing manga set in schools, because it avoids having a male cross-dressing character who hides that he is not a woman; instead, it features a setting where cross-dressing is encouraged and even required. They also felt it stood out among manga more generally by replacing the "unattainable girl" manga trope with a gay male romance, while featuring an inexperienced protagonist who is initiated into the societal rules of femininity and living as a woman. Natalie had looked forward to the collected volumes, calling them a "long-awaited" release with appealing cover designs. They found the character artwork cute and also appreciated how the manga stood out; they found that it helped diversify Waai!'s content and called it the foundation that the magazine rests on, with many other stories being more simplistic and solely revolving around how characters thought to be women are revealed to be cross-dressing men. Bukumaru appreciated its blend of seriousness and comedy and thought that the highlight was to see the main characters grow as people and come to terms with their pasts. Honcierge also enjoyed the comedy and drama and liked the characters, highlighting Aoi's portrayal as an intelligent beauty and how Tsubaki makes for a cute girl while still being able to stand up for himself.
