= Sazanami Cherry =

2010 manga by Rika Kamiyoshi

- Tankōbon cover art, featuring Ren Takano

さざなみチェリー (Sazanami Cherī)
- Genre: Romance
- Manga
- Written by: Rika Kamiyoshi
- Published by: Ichijinsha
- Imprint: Waai! Comics
- Magazine: Waai!
- Original run: April 24, 2010 – August 25, 2011
- Volumes: 1

Sazanami Cherry (Japanese: さざなみチェリー, Hepburn: Sazanami Cherī) is an otokonoko romance manga created by Rika Kamiyoshi. It was originally serialized by Ichijinsha in their magazine Waai! from April 24, 2010, to August 25, 2011, and has since been collected in a single tankōbon volume. Together with Reversible!, it was the first manga published under the Waai! Comics imprint.

The story follows Kazuhiro Migiwa, who falls in love with the cross-dresser Ren Takano under the belief that he is a woman, and their romantic relationship. Kamiyoshi wrote the story based on the concept of the unease around difficulties for otokonoko to remain feminine as they grow older and wrote the main characters as a gay couple to add more depth to the story. The series was well received and was considered by critics to stand out among otokonoko manga.

== Plot ==
Sazanami Cherry is an otokonoko romance manga following Kazuhiro Migiwa, who falls in love with Ren Takano on first sight. When confessing his love, he learns that Ren is a cross-dressing man, rather than a woman as he had first believed. Kazuhiro is surprised but does not let Ren's gender affect his attraction to him. They become a couple and begin dating, and Ren enjoys being treated like a woman and being seen as cute. One day while on a date they are confronted by Ren's older sister Kai, who disapproves of how he cross-dresses and pretends to be a woman, and tells him he will have to stop eventually.

Ren tells Kazuhiro about how he took an interest in cross-dressing after playing dress-up with Kai as a child, but that their father was upset at Kai over it, after which Kai has tried to stop Ren from wearing girls' clothes. Ren asks Kazuhiro if he could still love him if he stopped being feminine, and he does not know how to answer. When they see each other on the train the next day, Ren is wearing men's clothes and breaks up with Kazuhiro. Kai seeks out Kazuhiro, telling him about how Ren left her a message apologizing for cross-dressing. She reveals that she was herself assigned male at birth, but that her father did not accept that she preferred femininity until she was an adult; knowing the hardship of presenting femininely, she tried to dissuade Ren from it.

Kazuhiro explains to her how Ren feels, and they meet up with him to talk. Kai repeats what she told Kazuhiro and says that she was jealous of Ren for his femininity and for having a boyfriend. Ren is surprised, having only ever known her as a woman due to their age gap. They reconcile, and Ren takes up dressing like a woman again. Two years later, he is still cross-dressing and in a relationship with Kazuhiro. In an epilogue, Ren and Kai are shown having grown closer again.

== Production and release ==
Sazanami Cherry was written and illustrated by Rika Kamiyoshi, who was helped by her assistants Shiro and Mugicha with the background art and screentones. It was serialized by Ichijinsha in Japanese in their cross-dressing manga magazine Waai!, premiering on April 24, 2010, in the magazine's first issue and running until its sixth issue on August 25, 2011. The concept for the story came from how Kamiyoshi wanted to write a story about a cute cross-dresser falling in love, and to portray the unease of difficulties for otokonoko in remaining feminine while getting older. She considered whether the cross-dressing character's partner should be female or male, and if male, whether they too are a cross-dresser, finding this an important point in cross-dressing romance stories: she eventually chose to make Kazuhiro a male character, as she thought Kazuhiro and Ren being a gay couple would add depth to the story.

Kamiyoshi designed the characters in consultation with her editor but in the end only made few, minor alterations to the designs compared to her first drafts; for Kai, she did not prepare a design sheet in advance but designed her as a "somewhat pretty, realistic-looking" woman in her mid-20s. She designed Ren to be cute in a feminine way when wearing men's clothes and even more so when cross-dressing, while contrasting this by writing him as mischievous. A key point in his design to make him come across as charming was the addition of pigtail hair extensions that shake as he moves around. The main characters' names were chosen to carry meaning: "Ren" is written with the same kanji character as sazanami (漣; "waves"), and Kazuhiro's family name "Migiwa" (汀) means "shore", representing how Kazuhiro supports Ren. Kai's nickname, "Umi", is also based on kanji readings, chosen as a more feminine-sounding reading of the same kanji used to write "Kai" (海).

Ichijinsha collected the series in a single tankōbon volume on October 20, 2011, which together with Reversible! was both the first manga released under the Waai! Comics imprint and the first Waai! manga to see a collected release. The two series were chosen for this as Waai!'s editor-in-chief Toshinaga Hijikata considered them the most distinctive and representative of their manga. Because of the cross-dressing theme, the magazine staff focused on ensuring that the cover artwork for the collected volume would not cause embarrassment for potential customers and cause them to avoid bringing a copy to the book store check-out.

=== Collected edition ===
No.	Release date	ISBN
1	October 20, 2011	978-4758012430

== Reception ==
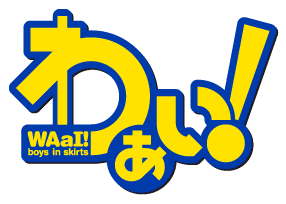
Sazanami Cherry was considered to stand out among the manga in Waai!

Sazanami Cherry was well received both critically and by readers; Bukumaru and Honcierge both considered it a must-read otokonoko manga, the latter calling it among the best written. Natalie found it to stand out among Waai!'s manga, helping diversify the magazine and forming the foundation that Waai! rests on.

Critics liked the writing, with Bukumaru calling it an exciting and sad love story. Honcierge called the story heartbreaking and appreciated how it made use of the otokonoko genre to tell a story that could not happen in other genres. The cast was well received, with both Natalie and Honcierge finding Ren cute and charming, the latter of whom appreciated seeing him act both cutely mischievous and sweetly with Kazuhiro, whom they found appealing for not letting Ren's gender affect his attraction to him. Bukumaru enjoyed following Ren and Kazuhiro's relationship and considered the highlight to be Ren's inner conflict around having to stop being feminine as he gets older.
