= Mahalo (disambiguation) =

"Mahalo" is the Hawaiian word for "thank you".

Mahalo may also refer to:

- mahalo.com, a web directory and question-and-answer site
- Mahalo Air, airline
- Waai! Mahalo, a manga magazine
