= Amachin wa Jishou Osu =

2017 manga series by Akane Terai

- Volume 1 cover art, featuring Amachin

あまちんは自称♂
- Genre: Romantic comedy
- Manga
- Written by: Akane Terai
- Published by: Kodansha
- Imprint: Magazine Edge Comics
- Magazine: Shonen Magazine Edge
- Original run: June 17, 2017 – April 17, 2023
- Volumes: 11

Amachin wa Jishou Osu (Japanese: あまちんは自称♂; "Amachin Calls Himself Male") (Note: The title is stylized with a Mars symbol (♂), which is read as osu (オス; "male").) is a Japanese otokonoko romantic comedy manga series by Akane Terai, which has been serialized by Kodansha in their magazine Shonen Magazine Edge from June 2017 to April 2023. Kodansha has also collected it in eleven tankōbon volumes. The story follows Amachin, a feminine young man who is attracted to his friend Tatsumi, and tries to make him like him back by dressing and acting cutely. The series was well received by readers and critics for its title character.

== Premise ==
Amachin wa Jishou Osu is an otokonoko romantic comedy manga set in Ishikawa Prefecture in Japan. It follows Kokoro "Amachin" Amasawa, a feminine young man who often gets mistaken for a woman due to his looks, to the point where his male classmates fall in love with him, including his childhood friend and classmate Tatsumi Kamishimo. Amachin is attracted to Tatsumi and tries to win him over by presenting himself in a cute way.

== Publication ==
Amachin wa Jishou Osu is written and illustrated by Akane Terai and was serialized by Kodansha in their manga magazine Shonen Magazine Edge from its July 2017 issue, released on June 17, 2017 to its May 2023 issue released on April 17, 2023. The series went on hiatus in April 2022, but resumed the same year in the magazine's October issue.

Since November 16, 2017, Kodansha has also collected the series in tankōbon volumes under the imprint Magazine Edge Comics. The fourth volume was made available in both a standard edition and a digital special edition that includes a photo book-style set of color illustrations depicting a date with Amachin. The volumes are also released in Chinese by Tong Li Publishing since 2019.

On December 25, 2021, a promotional video was released to celebrate the 500,000 sales of the series, in which Amachin was voiced by Hiromi Igarashi.

=== Volumes ===
No.	Release date	ISBN
1	November 16, 2017	978-4065104903
Chapter 1–7
2	May 7, 2018	978-4065114735
Chapter 8–13
3	November 15, 2018	978-4065136652
Chapter 14–19
4	May 16, 2019	978-4065157527
Chapter 20–25
5	November 15, 2019	978-4065176214
Chapter 26–31
6	May 15, 2020	978-4065195383
Chapter 32–36
7	November 17, 2020	978-4065214329
Chapter 37–41
8	May 17, 2021	978-4065232477
Chapter 42–46
9	November 17, 2021	978-4065259580
Chapter 47–51
10	March 16, 2023	978-4065310441
Chapter 52–56
11	June 15, 2023	978-4065319291
Chapter 57–62; Epilogue

== Reception ==
The series was well received and was nominated for the 2018 Next Manga Award. It is also popular with readers; in a 2020 survey about what manga series people would like to see adapted into an anime series, where 70% of respondents were women, Amachi wa Jishou Osu was the 15th most requested. The series has performed well commercially, with volume 1 maintaining the number one ranking on Pixiv for a month after its release. The print volumes sold enough to warrant a reprint of the first three volumes by May 2019.

Critics liked the title character for his cuteness; Music.jp appreciated the series for Amachin's cuteness, naivete, and slight eroticism, and called it a great and refreshing otokonoko series. Bukumaru called it a must-read otokonoko manga: they appreciated it for the contrast between Amachin's appearance and brazenness, calling him cuter than girls and bolder than guys. They also enjoyed the depiction of Amachin's and Tatsumi's relationship, finding it unique and interesting to follow. Honcierge also found the contrast interesting, exemplified by the volume 1 cover art, showing what appears to be a cute girl in the men's bathroom. They also enjoyed the rest of the cast, considering them to stand out, and liked their character designs, commending Terai for her ability to draw both cute and cool characters. Magmix recommended it to readers who like comedy manga.
