= Heroes: Legend of the Battle Disks =

Japanese anime television series

ヒーローズ ～バトルディスク伝説～ (Hīrōzu ~Batoru Disuku Densetsu~)
- Anime television series
- Directed by: Masahiro Hosoda
- Produced by: Hiroaki Taneoka, Kosuke Harada
- Written by: Junki Takegami
- Music by: Tomohisa Ishikawa
- Studio: Asahi Production
- Licensed by: MarVista Entertainment
- English network: SEA: HBO Family Asia; ZA: eToonz
- Original run: 23 November 2015 – 9 December 2015
- Episodes: 26

Heroes: Legend of the Battle Disks (ヒーローズ ～バトルディスク伝説～, Hīrōzu ~Batoru Disuku Densetsu~) is an anime series based on a toy line by the Spain-based company Magic Box Int. Toys. It was originally set to launch in the winter of 2013. In Latin America, the series began streaming on Netflix on July 15, 2015. An English version of the show began airing November 23, 2015, on HBO Family Asia.

== Production ==
In February 2011, Spanish toy manufacturer Magic Box Int. launched a line of collectible toys called Heroes: Legend of the Battle Disks in Europe.

In January 2013, Magic Box, in partnership with the Japanese studio Asahi Production, announced an anime adaptation set for broadcast in winter 2013. At the time, the series was expected to air in at least 28 markets, with the overall franchise expected to generate $370 million USD in revenue.

In September 2014, MarVista Entertainment acquired the global distribution rights to the series and debuted it at MIP Junior the following month. There it was revealed that the show would be directed by Masahiro Hosoda (Dragon Ball Z: Battle of Gods, Digimon Fusion), written by Junki Takegami (Naruto Shippuden the Movie, Hyakujuu Sentai Gaoranger) with character designs by Yoshihiro Nagamori (Bakugan, Beyblade), and available in 26 episodes x half-hour or 52 x thirteen minute formats. The show began airing in Latin America, South Africa and South East Asia in late 2015. The series officially debuted in the United States through Tubi TV on August 28, 2018.

== Episodes ==
No. overall	No. in series	Title	Original release date
1	1	"Come Forth! My Disk Monster!"	23 November 2015
2	2	"Come To Me! Chiko, The Baby Dragon"	23 November 2015
3	3	"I Am Yungel, The Forest Warrior!"	24 November 2015
4	4	"Exploration! The Secret Ancient Ruins!"	24 November 2015
5	5	"Kick! The Mysterious Giant Monster!"	25 November 2015
6	6	"Off I Go, To The Seas Of Zairan!"	25 November 2015
7	7	"I Won't Give Up! The Do Or Die Disk Collection!"	26 November 2015
8	8	"Help! I'm Still In The Nightmare!"	26 November 2015
9	9	"The Memories Hidden In The Ragged Cape"	27 November 2015
10	10	"Who's After The Battle Disks?"	27 November 2015
11	11	"Each And Every Battle! I Swear I Won't Lose!"	30 November 2015
12	12	"Overcoming Adversity! I Will Become A Hero!"	30 November 2015
13	13	"Orbiton Attacks! The Revenge Of Gronor!"	1 December 2015
14	14	"Toward The Entrusted Future! We're Off To Clonia!"	1 December 2015
15	15	"Where Can They Be? The Heroes In The Desert!"	2 December 2015
16	16	"Let's Go! Reveal The Secret Of Clonia!"	2 December 2015
17	17	"Beyond The Legend! Battle In The World Of Myth!"	3 December 2015
18	18	"Showdown! The Clash Of The Duo's Wills!"	3 December 2015
19	19	"A New Power! The Truth Of The Stone Of Light!"	4 December 2015
20	20	"The Heroes' Final Day!"	4 December 2015
21	21	"The Holy One! Protect The Priestess Maya!"	7 December 2015
22	22	"Infiltrating The Mother Ship! Free Priestess Maya!"	7 December 2015
23	23	"Everyone, Head For The Temple!"	8 December 2015
24	24	"Resurrection! The Legendary Red Dragon!"	8 December 2015
25	25	"Clash! The Alma-Packed Final Showdown!"	9 December 2015
26	26	"Take Off! Towards The Cosmic Unknown!"	9 December 2015
