= Teogonia =

Japanese light novel series

- First light novel volume cover

神統記(テオゴニア)
- Genre: Adventure; fantasy; Isekai
- Novel series
- Written by: Tsukasa Tanimai
- Published by: Shōsetsuka ni Narō
- Original run: August 7, 2017 – present
- Light novel
- Written by: Tsukasa Tanimai
- Illustrated by: Kouichiro Kawano
- Published by: Shufu to Seikatsu Sha
- English publisher: NA: J-Novel Club
- Imprint: PASH! Books
- Original run: March 30, 2018 – present
- Volumes: 3
- Manga
- Written by: Tsukasa Tanimai
- Illustrated by: Shunsuke Aoyama
- Published by: Shufu to Seikatsu Sha
- Magazine: Comic PASH!
- Original run: March 30, 2018 – present
- Volumes: 14
- Anime television series
- Directed by: Kunihiro Mori
- Written by: Tomoyasu Okubo
- Music by: Kenji Fujisawa
- Studio: Asahi Production
- Licensed by: Crunchyroll: SEA: Tropics Entertainment
- Original network: Tokyo MX, SUN, BS11
- Original run: April 12, 2025 – June 28, 2025
- Episodes: 12

Teogonia (神統記(テオゴニア)) is a Japanese light novel series written by Tsukasa Tanimai and illustrated by Kouichiro Kawano. It began serialization on the user-generated novel publishing website Shōsetsuka ni Narō in August 2017. It was later acquired by Shufu to Seikatsu Sha who began publishing it under their PASH! Books light novel imprint in March 2018. A manga adaptation illustrated by Shunsuke Aoyama began serialization on Shufu to Seikatsu Sha's Comic PASH! website in March 2018. An anime television series adaptation produced by Asahi Production aired from April to June 2025.

== Plot ==
In an era of relentless warfare, brutal battles rage between humans and demi-human tribes, such as the Ash Monkeys (Macaques) and the pig-like Ogres, who invade human lands. Kai, a boy from the village of Rag, spends his days fighting to protect his home.

Amid the brutal conflict, those known as "guardian bearers" wield immense power, enforcing the chaos. As Kai's comrades fall one by one, he suddenly has memories he shouldn't have—visions of a world with advanced technology and knowledge of life beyond this one.

Although he was once just a simple villager, Kai soon finds himself thrown into extraordinary trials. A fantasy tale unfolds, chronicling his struggle and growth in a ruthless world.

== Characters ==
Kai (カイ)
Voiced by: Mutsumi Tamura (Japanese); Rebecca Chiara Marano (English)
Jose (ジョゼ, Joze)
Voiced by: Kana Hanazawa (Japanese); Rebecca Danae (English)
Orha (オルハ, Oruha)
Voiced by: Yoshitsugu Matsuoka (Japanese); Ricco Fajardo (English)
Vegin (ヴェジン, Vejin)
Voiced by: Atsushi Miyauchi (Japanese); Christopher Guerrero (English)
Manso (マンソ)
Voiced by: Masaya Fukunishi (Japanese); Tom Aglio (English)
Elsa (エルサ, Erusa)
Voiced by: Manaka Iwami
Alue (アルゥエ, Aruue)
Voiced by: Hana Tamegai
Polek (ポレック, Porekku)
Voiced by: Hiroshi Naka
The Valley God (谷の神, Tani no Kami)
Voiced by: Banjō Ginga

== Media ==
=== Light novel ===
Written by Tsukasa Tanimai, Teogonia began serialization on the user-generated novel publishing website Shōsetsuka ni Narō on August 7, 2017. It was later acquired by Shufu to Seikatsu Sha who began publishing it with illustrations by Kouichiro Kawano under their PASH! Books imprint on March 30, 2018. Three volumes have been released as of June 2019. During their Anime NYC 2019 panel, J-Novel Club announced that they licensed the light novels for English publication.

No.	Original release date	Original ISBN	North American release date	North American ISBN
1	March 30, 2018	978-4-391-15169-5	February 15, 2020	978-1-718-37098-2
2	July 27, 2018	978-4-391-15217-3	May 1, 2020	978-1-718-37100-2
3	June 28, 2019	978-4-391-15279-1	July 20, 2020	978-1-718-37102-6

=== Manga ===
A manga adaptation illustrated by Shunsuke Aoyama began serialization on Shufu to Seikatsu Sha's Comic PASH! website on March 30, 2018. The manga's chapters have been collected into fourteen tankōbon volumes as of April 2026. Starting in April 2025 to coincide with the release of the anime, it is being released in English translation both as chapters and volumes with seven volumes available in English as of June 2025.

No.	Original release date	Original ISBN	English release date	English ISBN
1	November 30, 2018	978-4-391-15255-5	April 11, 2025	—
2	May 31, 2019	978-4-391-15280-7	April 11, 2025	—
3	October 25, 2019	978-4-391-15412-2	April 11, 2025	—
4	April 24, 2020	978-4-391-15457-3	April 11, 2025	—
5	October 30, 2020	978-4-391-15524-2	April 11, 2025	—
6	May 7, 2021	978-4-391-15595-2	May 30, 2025	—
7	December 3, 2021	978-4-391-15596-9	June 20, 2025	—
8	July 1, 2022	978-4-391-15777-2		
9	January 6, 2023	978-4-391-15911-0		
10	August 4, 2023	978-4-391-16029-1		
11	April 5, 2024	978-4-391-16230-1		
12	July 5, 2024	978-4-391-16313-1		
13	April 4, 2025	978-4-391-16475-6		
14	April 4, 2026	978-4-391-16637-8		

=== Anime ===
An anime television series adaptation was announced on April 5, 2024. It is produced by Asahi Production and directed by Kunihiro Mori, with scripts written by Tomoyasu Okubo, characters designed by Kouichiro Kawano, and music composed by Kenji Fujisawa. The series aired from April 12 to June 28, 2025, on Tokyo MX and other networks. (Note: Tokyo MX, SUN and BS11 lists the series premiere on April 11, 2025, at 24:30, which is effectively April 12 at 12:30 a.m. JST.) The opening theme song is "Shoudou" (衝動; Impulse), performed by Aimi Noda, while the ending theme song is "Tsuki to Boku to Atarashii Jibun" (月と僕と新しい自分; The Moon, Me, and My New Self) performed by STU48. Crunchyroll streamed the series. Tropics Entertainment licensed the series in Southeast Asia for streaming on the Tropics Anime Asia YouTube channel.

==== Episodes ====
No.	Title	Directed by (Note: Production staff information is taken from the ending credits of each episode.)	Written by	Storyboarded by	Original release date
1	"Kai of Lag Village"; Transliteration: "Ragu Mura no Kai" (Japanese: ラグ村の少年(カイ))	Masato Suzuki	Tomoyasu Okubo	Kunihiro Mori	April 12, 2025
During an attack by Ash Monkeys on Lag Village the young warrior Kai is saved by Olha Vezin, a Guardian Bearer blessed by the Land God. Kai considers it unfair the monkey's God-stones which increase spiritual power are given to Bearer's like Olha, whereas warriors are only granted a few drops each. Olha's father Baron Moloch throws a victory feast, but Kai notices warriors receive far less food than Moloch and his family. Kai is troubled by visions of strange objects and alternate worlds. Olha's sister Jose resents not being allowed to fight because she is female. Kai daydreams about something he envisioned called Magic, a strange power he is sure would be useful if it actually existed. His squad leader claims it could be true since in the past there was a monk that could spray fire from his fingertips. Kai starts to wonder if maybe spiritual power can generate magic. Soldiers from Lag and Banya team up to fight Orgs. In battle Kai manages to push spiritual energy from his own God-stone through his fingers into a fireball. Unfortunately, the fire proves difficult to extinguish and he is drained of almost all his spiritual power, making him weak. An org blinded by his fire pushes them both over a cliff into a lake.
2	"Lady Jose"; Transliteration: "Joze-sama" (Japanese: 白姫(ジョゼ)様)	Motohiko Niwa & Kunihiro Mori	Tomoyasu Okubo	Kunihiro Mori	April 19, 2025
Kai consumes the orgs God-stone, having never had an entire one to himself before. The next morning he awakens and finds he bears the face crest of a Guardian Bearer and wonders if he was blessed by the Land God like Moloch and his children. A nearby stone tablet appears familiar but he ignores it and returns to Lag. The warriors notice his increased abilities but Kai claims he merely consumed several God-stones trying to stay alive. Jose happens to spot Kai making fire and reveals he is an Ability-user, a gift found only in certain families, or in monks who train for years. Jose offers to keep his secret if he trains her to fight. Jose reveals there is a grave she cleans regularly and asks Kai to go with her by joining her guards. The land surrounding the grave has withered thanks to the Land God losing power over the area, so as a Guardian Bearer Jose regularly prays there hoping to re-establish that power. Jose begins cleaning the gravestone dedicated to the Land God and Kai sees it is the same kind of tablet as the one by the lake, though when he touches it he becomes able to translate some of the carvings. Ash Monkey's attack and while protecting her Jose momentarily sees his crest before it disappears again.
3	"Arbitration God"; Transliteration: "Chōteishin" (Japanese: 調停神)	Takahiro Otsuka	Yasutoshi Yamada	Nishida Masayoshi & Kunihiro Mori	April 26, 2025
Jose is scolded for putting herself at risk. Kai's actions impress the warriors, especially the servant Elsa. The warriors assume there is something romantic between Kai and Jose. Kai is drawn back to the lake gravestone which he cleans as thanks to the unknown God. Kai notices the land is unusually fertile and decides to build a cabin. Requiring wood, a vision tells him to use magic to break the bonds between the tree molecules, even though he has no idea what molecules are. He is interrupted by a group of dwarf-like Koror and their elder Porek. Porek explains orgs drove them from their land, so they have come hoping to beg the protection of the powerful Valley God, who in Porek's youth took his eyes as penance for trespassing in the valley. Porek is certain Kai is the Arbitration God come to intercede between them and the orgs, and as payment has already sacrificed his granddaughter Aruwe to the valley. Horrified Kai retrieves Aruwe and heals her body's damaged cells, despite not knowing what cells are. Orgs attack the Koror so Kai rushes to save them, with the voice of the Valley God urging him to annihilate the orgs. From his godly blue flames Porek confirms Kai is the God of Arbitration; he who smites the guilty, grants mercy to the innocent and wields the Scales of Life.
4	"A Small Paradise"; Transliteration: "Ko Rakuen" (Japanese: 小楽園)	Aoi Mori	Yasutoshi Yamada	Nishida Masayoshi & Midori Mori	May 3, 2025
Porek reveals the org leader was also a Guardian Bearer, so if Kai eats its God-stone he will absorb its God's power too. Kai's own God-stone reacts painfully and he rushes back to the Valley where he dreams of the monster that killed his family. He awakens to find Aruwe caring for him. She insists as a sacrifice she belongs to the Arbitration God and must serve him. Porek reveals until he has mastered his power Kai will be an easy target for other Gods. Porek also asks permission to build a home in the valley. Feeling overwhelmed Kai demands Aruwe return to Porek and forbids them from entering the valley. Moloch challenges Kai to a training duel. Kai holds back to not draw any God's attention and loses the duel. Moloch decides to train Kai personally. Kai returns to the valley and finds Uruwe has built a hut next to the gravestone and the Koror a campsite in the forest. Kai shares his time between the valley and Lag; practising magic, training Jose and training with Moloch. Elsa is upset Kai forgot they came from the same village before monsters destroyed it. This causes Kai to remember why he wanted to become a warrior. A giant org leads his army to the valley to destroy the Valley God.
5	"The Priest and the Inspector"; Transliteration: "Sō to Junsatsu-shi" (Japanese: 僧と巡察使)	Masato Suzuki	Tomoyasu Okubo	Masato Suzuki & Aoi Mori	May 10, 2025
Kai wonders why rice balls keep appearing in his visions. A Royal Inspector visits Lag to collect taxes. As they are already struggling Moloch orders most of their grain hidden so the Inspector can't take it. Inspector Gandal, a fat, arrogant Guardian Bearer, criticises Moloch for not killing enough monsters and tells Jose she should find a husband. Monk Nada visits from Maas Monastery and demonstrates to Kai that by consuming multiple God-stones he acquired a facial crest despite not being blessed by any God. Gandal angers everyone by demanding lavish meals. Nada informs Moloch a large org army is looking for something and requests warriors help him investigate. Moloch sends Jose with Nada, Kai and the warriors to find the org army. Elsa gives Kai experimental rice balls made from grain, but Kai gets the feeling they should be wrapped in some sort of green leaf. Nada explains a prophesy has predicted the rise of a new God and it is vital humans be the first to worship at its gravestone so it can't be claimed by monsters. Kai is afraid Nada might be looking for him as the supposed Arbitration God. Jose spots a village of peaceful Uzelle demihumans destroyed by orgs. Jose is amazed the Uzelle's female Baron killed several orgs by herself before dying, proving women can be warriors. Kai realises the org army is heading directly for his valley.
6	"Rigdaros"; Transliteration: "Rigudarosu" (Japanese: 六頭将(リグダロス))	Daiki Nishimura	Yasunori Yamada	Hiroshi Aoyama & Aoi Mori	May 17, 2025
Olha is furious when he discovers a camp of a hundred Ash Monkeys and his men refuse to attack them without reinforcements. Jose worries Kai has been gone a long time and must be talked out of following him. Nada uses magic to spy on Kai from a distance. Kai nears the valley and finds the Koror preparing to defend the Valley God and their new home. The orgs leader suddenly spots them. Gandal sets lascivious eyes on Elsa but is distracted by the cook Adelia. The org leader turns out to be Adurakan, one of the six Rigdaros, the strongest of the org Guardian-Bearers. Adurakan turns out to have a powerful healing ability granted by his Land God so he recovers from all injuries almost instantly, even from Kai's fire. Kai drops Elsa's riceballs and notices the ball is only composed of individual grains, just like tree molecules and human cells, all of which can be separated. He suddenly invents a new spell, an invisible blade that transcends the power of a Land God's blessing and he cuts Adurakan's God-Stone neatly in half, killing him before consuming the stone to take the God's power. The orgs flee and Kai collapses. Jose collapses from a wound on her leg she had been ignoring.
7	"Truthseeker"; Transliteration: "Shinri Tankyū-kan" (Japanese: 真理探究官)	Kunihiro Mori & Shinichi Ide	Tomoyasu Ohkubo	Yoshio Suzuki, Midori Mori & Aoi Mori	May 24, 2025
Kai is told by Porek that consuming Adurakan's God-Stone somehow caused the God himself extreme pain. He returns to the warriors and tells them the orgs were defeated by some unknown enemy. Nada knows Kai is lying but says nothing. They return Jose to Lag and find it was raided by Ash Monkeys. Moloch reveals Olha has the same wound as Jose, a curse caused by the Monkeys corrupting their God's gravestones. Nada offers to purge the gravestones in Elg and Eda villages and is given Kai as a guard. Kai says goodbye to Elsa and promises to see her again. Nada uses magic to scout Elg, causing Kai to realise Nada watched his fight against Adurakan. Nada asks Kai to move to the capital where the Arbitration God could do the most good, pointing out corrupt officials like Gandal have weakened the King, the Gods and the land, and without a new God the kingdom will fall. Feeling insulted, the Valley God urges Kai to kill Nada but he resists. With his gravestone cleared Olha starts to recover. Nada and Kai clear Jose's gravestone in Eda and Nada suddenly asks Kai to abandon the Koror in order to offer his God's power to humans. Kai refuses to abandon anyone who needs him, so Nada stabs him in the back.
8	"To Ispi Rio"; Transliteration: "Isupi Rio e" (Japanese: 大霊河(イスピ・リオ)へ)	Yoshio Suzuki	Yasunori Yamada	Yoshio Suzuki & Hiroshi Aoyama	May 31, 2025
Nada reveals the dagger is a holy treasure that can drain a God's strength. As Kai has proven too strong willed to control Nada plans to consume his God-Stone and replace him as Arbitration God. In Lag Moloch prepares everyone to defend against another Ash-Monkey attack. Kai insists his power was given to him to protect Lag and the Valley, and nothing else. Guardian-Bearer Monkey's attack them and in the fighting Kai saves Nada, who starts to understand why the Valley God gave Kai his power. Nada uses his far-seeing magic to track the Monkeys for Kai who kills two of them, but the third stabs Nada. Olha recovers and joins the battle in Lag. Kai tries to heal Nada but Nada's own God-Stone has been pierced and can't be healed even with magic. Before dying, Nada finds it amusing that with the power of Destruction and Restoration Kai might be capable of controlling destiny. Jose awakens but rather than follow Moloch's orders to escape she takes over care of the frightened women and children. To save himself Gandal murders a warrior, takes Elsa hostage and opens the main gate for his carriage to escape, allowing the Monkey's to enter Lag.
9	"The Power of God"; Transliteration: "Kami no Chikara" (Japanese: 神の力)	Harune Kosaka	Tomoyasu Okubo	Midori Mori, Harune Kosaka & Kunihiro Mori	June 7, 2025
Kai rushes back to Lag. Moloch's men realise the Monkey's want Moloch's God-Stone, so they paint fake Bearer crests on their own faces to confuse the Monkey's. Jose decides to fight as well, taking an Uzelle spear to honour the Uzelle Baron. Kai arrives and battles the Monkey's outside the gate, killing most of them until their leader retreats. Kai claims his facial crest was also fake, though no one believes him. Kai learns of Elsa's kidnapping and chases after Gandel's carriage so quickly his raging aura spooks the horses and the carriage crashes. Kai finds he can't heal Elsa's injuries, yet he witnesses Gandel healing himself with his Guardian-Bearer power. Gandel claims Elsa's injury was Kai's fault for not controlling his power and that it shouldn't belong to a commoner like Kai. Kai kills Gandel and feeds his God-Stone to Elsa, which still doesn't work. Desperate, he takes her to Porek who explains a human consuming another human's God-Stone is poisonous if done improperly and quickly begins treating her. The Monkey leader approaches and claims Kai bears the crest of their God Kanae, so he begs Kai to come with them back to their land.
10	"The Great God Kanae"; Transliteration: "Kanae no Ōgami" (Japanese: 鼎の大神)	Higashiko Yamauchi & Katsuko Kase	Tomoyasu Okubo	Aoi Mori & Masato Suzuki	June 14, 2025
The leader, Torud, explains the Ash-Monkey's lands of Heju have become corrupted by the God Diabo and have become unlivable. He thus asks Kai to help defeat Diabo so the Monkeys can go home, or they will be forced to continue fighting humans for survival. Porek reminds Kai the Arbitration God transcends species and he is bound by celestial laws to respond to their request for justice. Kai returns to Lag and informs Moloch the Monkey's may soon attack again. Olha is angry Kai did so well in the battle while he did almost nothing. If he had distinguished himself instead of Kai news would have reached the capital, improved the Moloch family status and brought prosperity to Lag. Kai decides to end the fighting by helping the Monkey's. Jose gives Kai her own dagger for the trip. Since a human travelling with a Monkey would draw attention Kai disguises himself as a Koror and says goodbye to the still unconscious Elsa. Porek also gives Kai Adurakan's axe to protect himself. In the capital the nobles discuss whether to assist Lag and other villages like them or ignore them. Kai enters Heju and finds the Monkey's barely surviving in dire circumstances due to Diabo's corruption. Torud takes him to meet their Baron Abridor.
11	"Diabo"; Transliteration: "Diabo" (Japanese: 悪神(ディアボ))	Masato Suzuki	Yasunori Yamada	Katsuko Kase, Midori Mori & Toru Yoshida	June 21, 2025
Abridor reveals the Ash-Monkey King fell into corruption, weakening the land. Shendor, one of the King's sons, fled to foreign lands seeking a new God. After finding one he made many enemies who laid curses on his God in revenge until Shendor mutated into Diabo, returned home and ate his father and brothers. Kai agrees to defeat Diabo and is taken to the former King's palace Dehoushi. There they find the Gahama, the king's bodyguards, insisting Diabo must be killed by Zayena, the former king's youngest daughter. Zayena turns out to have enslaved Deuswulf, God of the Northern Lands, with mind controlling herbs and a magic staff. Unfortunately, Diabo is poisonous and Deuswulf is paralysed after biting it. Kai ignores Zayena and manages to revive Deuswulf. Valley God tells Kai to ignore Diabo's body and strike at the God-Stone. Zayena plans to take Diabo's God-Stone so she can seize her father's throne. Kai stops her from controlling Deuswulf again. Zayena mocks him for claiming to be an Arbitration God despite being so pathetically indecisive. Deuswulf evolves a resistance to poison from Kai's magic and attacks Diabo. Diabo is enraged and grows even larger absorbing spiritual energy from the land itself. Deuswulf is restrained and Kai saves Zayena but loses Jose's sword.
12	"Protector of Kanae"; Transliteration: "Kanae no Shugo-sha" (Japanese: 鼎の守護者)	Aoi Mori & Toru Yoshida	Tomoyasu Okubo	Aoi Mori & Toru Yoshida	June 28, 2025
Valley God shows Kai that unless he masters himself then everything he cares about will be taken by Diabo. Kai has a vision of a process called Calcification, from which he realises he can protect himself from Diabo's poison by making his skin hard like the outside of a God-Stone. Having transcended his former being, Kai awakens as the true Kanae. Acknowledging him as a fellow God, Deuswulf assists Kai. Zayena unwillingly assists him to ensure Diabo won't escape. Kai cuts Diabo apart and exposes Shendor at the centre, then destroys Diabo's God-Stone, returning Shendor to normal. Kai collapses from exhaustion and Zayena realises if she is to be a good Queen she cannot succumb to pride as her father and brothers did. Abridor swears eternal friendship between Kai and the Ash-Monkey kingdom. As Abridor's rival for the throne Zayena warns Kai they may yet become enemies, but she acknowledges him as the God Kanae and frees Deuswulf. Kai returns to Lag with the news the Ash-Monkey's are unlikely to return. Jose notices Kai seems to have inexplicably matured in only a few days. Olha reports with Gandal missing the capital might suspect Lag. Elsa continues to improve but does not yet awaken. As a new God, Kai considers turning the valley into his own nation. A few days later Nirun, daughter of the Chief of the Uzelle kingdom, requests permission for her people to worship Kai alongside the Koror, pleasing the Valley God that Kai is already gathering worshippers.
