= Onsen Yōsei Hakone-chan =

Japanese manga and anime series

- Cover of Onsen Yōsei Hakone-chan volume 1 by Aplix

温泉幼精ハコネちゃん
- Genre: Comedy, supernatural
- Manga
- Written by: Daisuke Yui
- Published by: Flex Comix
- Imprint: Flex Comix
- Magazine: Comic Meteor
- Original run: 2012 – December 22, 2015
- Volumes: 2
- Anime television series
- Directed by: Takeyuki Yanase
- Written by: Korie Tomonaga; Momoko Murakami
- Studio: Asahi Production; Production Reed
- Licensed by: NA: Crunchyroll
- Original network: TVS, tvk, KBS, Sun TV, Animax
- Original run: October 4, 2015 – December 27, 2015
- Episodes: 13

Onsen Yōsei Hakone-chan (温泉幼精ハコネちゃん; lit. Young Hot Spring Fairy Hakone-chan) is a Japanese manga series written and illustrated by Daisuke Yui. It began serialization online via Flex Comix's Comic Meteor website in 2012 and has since been collected into two tankōbon volumes. An anime television series adaptation by Asahi Production and Production Reed aired from October to December 2015.

== Characters ==
Hakone (ハコネ)
Voiced by: Saki Ono
Hakone is the hot spring spirit enshrined at the well in Tōya's backyard. She was awakened when he wished for a favorable fortune with Haruna, with whom he has a crush on her. Since she is weakened from her long slumber, she takes the form of a little girl. She regains her full adult form when her powers are fully recharged. She is also endowed with a magical yosegi puzzle box she sometimes use. She is later hired by the local association of hot spring owners to be their ambassador.
Tōya (冬哉)
Voiced by: Taishi Murata
Tōya is in charge of cleaning the well, where Hakone is enshrined, in their backyard. He awakened Hakone when, after wishing for a favorable fortune with Haruna, he accidentally dropped his offering of a steamed bun into the well. His family also owns a steamed bun factory.
Miya (ミヤ)
Voiced by: Yūki Kuwahara
Miya is the second hot spring spirit to awaken, she being the spirit of the Miyanoshita Hot Springs. Hakone's archrival is dressed in a Gothic outfit and speaks in a refined manner. She owns the new hot spring resort hotel in the neighborhood. She is also endowed with magical puzzle box. She aims to battle Hakone at first, but given the threat of the new hot spring spirits, she joins forces with her. She also has a crush on Tōya, partly due to Hakone's magic unleashed on her.
Haruna (榛名)
Voiced by: Mao Ichimichi
Haruna's family owns the Shunjusou, a hot spring hotel near Tōya's place. Tōya has a crush on her, and Hakone is helping him win her over, though she is older than him. Despite her calm demeanor, there is a side of her that is so strict everyone is scared of it. She also later shows that side whenever Tōya is cavorting with another girl.
Aki (亜季)
Voiced by: Ayaka Asai
Fourteen year-old Aki is Haruna's younger sister who would tag along with her, Tōya, and Hakone on the latter's quest to regain her powers.
Gōra (ゴウラ)
Voiced by: Aoi Yūki
Gōra is the spirit of Gōra Park, and, along with Ashinoko, aims to dominate the hot springs in the area. She is dressed in a kimono quite similar to that of Sakura Shinguji.
Ashinoko (アシノコ)
Voiced by: Ayana Taketatsu
Ashinoko, the guardian of Ashinoko Shrine, is another new hot spring spirit who helps Gōra to dominate the hot springs in the area. She wears a sailor uniform.
Otama (お玉)
Voiced by: Nozomi Furuki
Hakoneko (ハコネコ)
Voiced by: Mitsuo Iwata

== Media ==
=== Anime ===
An anime television adaptation by Asahi Production aired from October 2015 to December 2015.

==== Episode list ====
No.	Title	Original release date
1	"Hakone-chan Has Descended!" "Hakone-chan Kōrin!" (ハコネちゃん降臨！)	October 4, 2015
Tōya is cleaning the well in their backyard and offered a steam bun as he wished he would get closer to Haruna. The steam bun fell into the well, and just then Hakone, the guardian of the well, awakens and appears in front of him. At first he won't believe it, because she assumes the form of a little girl (he knows that a hot spring spirit is a beautiful adult woman), until he hears from her about his wish. And she wants more, in exchange for her keeping his wish a secret.
2	"Hakone-chan and the Secret Box" "Hakone-chan to Himitsu-bako" (ハコネちゃんと秘密箱)	October 11, 2015
Hakone is introduced to Haruna's younger sister Aki. She won't believe Hakone is a hot spring fairy, so she proved it by improving the hot spring's water. Hakone gets weakened in the process. Later, she gets treated to some steamed buns, and is amazed that Tōya's family is producing them by the thousands. She also used her secret puzzle box to make Haruna fall for Tōya, but the effect is temporary due to her diminished powers.
3	"Hakone-chan and Hakoneko" "Hakone-chan to Hakoneko" (ハコネちゃんとハコネコ)	October 18, 2015
Hakone is introduced to the neighborhood association of hotel and hot springs resort owners. She is also introduced to Hakoneko, the town mascot, which terrifies her. When the association sees how she attacked the mascot, they asked her to do it again, which she agrees to. She is then made into the town's tour ambassador, much to Tōya's dismay.
4	"Hot Spring Spirit Hakone-chan" "Hakone-chan to Kankō Taishi" (ハコネちゃんと観光大使)	October 25, 2015
Hakone starts her job as tour ambassador, much to Aki's surprise. She did some "magic tricks" with the spring water, causing her to weaken. Tōya treats Hakone to a pair of hair ties for her hard work, but when he treats her like a kid, she demands steamed buns as punishment.
5	"Hakone-chan and Hakone-sama" "Hakone-chan to Hakone-sama" (ハコネちゃんとハコネ様)	November 1, 2015
One day Aki finds an unfamiliar girl in the washroom. She later finds out that the adult girl is Hakone, with her powers fully charged. She planned to go out, and not until Aki lends her her spare school uniform; but nobody in the neighborhood, including Tōya, recognizes her in her grown-up form, making her sad. Haruna sees the two of them, feeling a bit jealous. It's only when she sneezed (unleashing her powers in the process) that she returned to her child form and Tōya is able to recognize her, much to Haruna's relief. They later find out that the reason for her adult form manifesting is due to the devotion the people gives her by recognizing her tour ambassador work.
6	"Hakone-chan and Miya-chan" "Hakone-chan to Miya-chan" (ハコネちゃんとミヤちゃん)	November 8, 2015
One day a new hotel is opening. Haruna and Aki gets to know Miya, its youthful-looking owner. Miya tries underhanded tactics to gain customers by hypnotizing them using a secret puzzle box quite similar to what Hakone is using. Tōya finds that out, and it is later revealed that Miya is a hot spring spirit--which Hakone identifies as the guardian spirit of Miyanoshita Hot springs, and her archrival. Miya tried using her Water of Servitude on Hakone, but she ran out. Hakone unleashes her magic box's powers, causing Miya to fall for Tōya. Amidst this, two unknown spirits are observing them.
7	"Hakone-chan and the Hot Spring Pool" "Hakone-chan to Onsen Pūru" (ハコネちゃんと温泉プール)	November 15, 2015
Miya invites Haruna, Aki, Tōya, and Hakone over to her hot spring pool. But Miya has a motive for inviting Hakone: to get back at her for what she did earlier. The two unidentified spirits from earlier tries to join in their duel, but a troop of monkeys--what hot spring spirits hate the most--interrupts them. Tōya drives them away using a bunch of steamed buns. Haruna gets mad when she sees Tōya and Miya close together.
8	"Hakone-chan and Jigokudani" "Hakone-chan to Jigokudani" (ハコネちゃんと地獄谷)	November 22, 2015
Haruna, Aki, Tōya, Hakone and Miya head over to Owakudani to distribute fliers. Hakone finds out that the place they have come to is Jigokudani, and is scared stiff believing there are demons around. Hakone panics, running away scared (and the others chasing after her), until she sees the Hakoneko mascot. The two unknown spirits are also scared as well, and they run scared until they bump into Hakone. The three are scared when the man behind the mascot suit removes its head portion.
9	"Hakone-chan and Otamagaike" "Hakone-chan to Otamagaike" (ハコネちゃんとお玉ヶ池)	November 29, 2015
Hakone, Miya, and Tōya are on a steamed bun delivery run to Otamagaike. Along the way they see the Hakone Checkpoint marker, and got to see the ghost of the woman who got executed for sneaking past the checkpoint without a pass that has been haunting the place for centuries. It scared Tōya and Miya, but the ghose recognizes her. Hakone realizes that the ghost is that of Otama, the woman whom she allowed to sneak past the checkpoint, much to Miya and Tōya's surprise. Hakone later helps Otama pass on by bathing in special hot spring water. The two unknown spirits tried to pounce on the bathing ladies, but were scared away upon seeing Otama's ghost.
10	"Hakone-chan and Gora Park" "Hakone chanto Gōra kōen" (ハコネちゃんと強羅公園)	December 6, 2015
It is here that the two unknown spirits--Gōra and Ashinoko--reveal their identities. Meanwhile, Haruna, Aki, Tōya, Hakone and Miya head over to Gōra Park which, unbeknownst to them, is Gōra's domain. She starts attacking them, but destroys the park in the process, much to her remorse. It could have been worse if not for Ashinoko's timely intervention.
11	"Hakone-chan and the Tekkosen" "Hakone chanto tetsukabuto-sen" (ハコネちゃんと鉄甲船)	December 13, 2015
To find a solution to their weakened powers, Hakone and Miya, accompanied by Haruna, Aki, and Tōya, travel to Ashinoko via the Tekkosen tour boat. Miya reminds Hakone to be vigilant (although her vigilance lapses thanks to Tōya's presence), especially that they are passing through Ashinoko's domain.
12	"Hakone-chan and the New Hot Spring Spirits" "Hakone chanto aratana onsen seirei" (ハコネちゃんと新たな温泉精霊)	December 20, 2015
Hakone and Miya, accompanied by Haruna, Aki, and Tōya, are returning to Motohakone via the Tekkosen. Miya tries using her Water of Servitude to deal with the crowds, but that left her open for Gōra to snatch her secret puzzle box. Hakone goes after them to retrieve it, making Miya realize (through Tōya) that Hakone does not see her as an enemy, but as a friend. Miya is then urged to help Hakone. Miya is able to lunge at Gōra and take her puzzle box back. She then unleashes its powers, making Gōra grovel uncontrollably. As the ship returns to Motohakone, everyone races back to the shrine.
13	"A New Day with Hakone-chan" "Hakone chanto mata atarashī nichijō" (ハコネちゃんとまた新しい日常)	December 27, 2015
For a moment Hakone and Miya regained their full powers upon reaching the shrine. Hakone mentions that no hot spring spirit can warm the soul with stolen powers. Sensing wisdom in her words Gōra tells Ashinoko to stop. Ashinoko turns on Gōra as a result, but that is because Ashinoko, being still too young, cannot fully handle her powers yet. Hakone and Miya return to their weakened states because of using too much power, but Hakone manages to neutralize the enraged Ashinoko, causing her to disappear. They fail to find her, but managed to return to her well a few seasons later. Gōra and Ashinoko started working around Haruna's family-owned resort, and things return to normal.
