= Himegoto =

2011 manga series by Norio Tsukudani

- Volume 6 manga cover, featuring Kaguya Arikawa (left) and Hime Arikawa

ひめゴト
- Genre: Comedy
- Manga
- Written by: Norio Tsukudani
- Published by: Ichijinsha
- Magazine: Waai!; Waai! Mahalo; Monthly Comic Rex; Febri
- Original run: November 25, 2011 – June 17, 2015 (Note: November 25, 2011–February 25, 2014 in Waai!; April 25, 2012–December 25, 2013 in Waai! Mahalo; October 27, 2013–June 27, 2015 in Monthly Comic Rex; June 20, 2014–June 17, 2015 in Febri)
- Volumes: 6 (Note: The tankōbon volumes combine the chapters serialized in Waai!, Waai! Mahalo, Monthly Comic Rex and Febri.)
- Anime television series
- Directed by: Yūji Yanase
- Written by: Kazuho Hyodo
- Music by: Hiroyuki Kozu
- Studio: Asahi Production
- Licensed by: NA: Crunchyroll
- Original network: BS11
- Original run: July 7, 2014 – September 29, 2014
- Episodes: 13

Himegoto (Japanese: ひめゴト; lit. "Secret"), also known as Secret Princess, is a Japanese manga series written and illustrated by Norio Tsukudani. It was originally serialized in Ichijinsha's Waai! magazine, but was later featured in three additional magazines published by Ichijinsha: Waai! Mahalo, Monthly Comic Rex and Febri. Collectively, Himegoto was serialized across the four magazines from November 2011 to June 2015 and was collected into six tankōbon volumes.

The story focuses on Hime Arikawa, a high school boy whose sizable debt is paid off by the girls of his school's student council. In exchange, he agrees to join the student council and spend the rest of his high school life dressed as a girl. An anime television series adaptation by Asahi Production aired from July to September 2014. Critics panned it for its characters, its focus on humiliation and shame, and reliance on a single joke throughout the series.

== Plot ==
Himegoto follows Hime Arikawa, a second-year student at Shimoshina High School (霜科高校, Shimoshina Kōkō). Forced to assume a large amount of debt from his now-absent parents, Hime is saved by the three girls of his school's student council after he is chased down by debt collectors. In return for paying off his debt, Hime agrees to their conditions of becoming the student council's servant and spending his high school life dressed as a girl.

== Characters ==
Hime Arikawa (有川 ひめ, Arikawa Hime)
Voiced by: Yūki Kuwahara
The protagonist of the series, Hime is a feminine-looking second-year high school student who gets troubled by debt collectors because his parents have racked up a large amount of debt in his name for constantly traveling overseas. When the student council pays off his creditors, he is obligated to join them as a servant, and must also cross-dress for the rest of his time in high school.^{[vol. 1]} While at first he only cross-dresses because he has no other choice, he starts to slowly shows signs of enjoying it, much to the delight of his brother and the student council.
Aruku 18-kin (歩く18禁, Aruku Jūhachi-kin; "Walking 18+")
Voiced by: Yuka Matenrō
18-kin is the student council vice-president.^{[vol. 1]} She often forces Hime into unreasonable situations. Her father is the board chairman of the school.^{[vol. 1]} Despite how much she enjoys making fun of Hime, she never allows actual harm to come to him. She has feelings for Hime and likes kissing.^{[vol. 5]} Her real name is Tōya Shimoshina (霜科 十八, Shimoshina Tōya).^{[vol. 5]}
Unko (運子)
Voiced by: Saki Ono
Unko is the student council president at Shimoshina.^{[vol. 1]} She is an intelligent and athletic girl.^{[vol. 1]} Although her name is actually Sadako Ijūin (伊集院 運子, Ijūin Sadako),^{[vol. 5]} this reminds her of the horror character Sadako, so she prefers to use Unko because she is afraid of ghosts.^{[vol. 2]}
Albertina II (アルベルティーナ 2世, Aruberutīna Ni-sei)
Voiced by: Hisako Tōjō
Albertina II, who also goes by "Bell" (ベル, Beru), is the student council secretary.^{[vol. 1]} She is a popular manga artist, and uses Hime as the basis for the title character in her manga Magical Boy Hime Kiss (魔法少年ヒメキッス, Mahō Shōnen Hime Kissu).^{[vol. 2]} She is sensitive about her small chest and gets upset whenever the issue of size comes up.^{[vol. 1]} Her real name is China Abe (阿部 ちな, Abe China).^{[vol. 5]}
Kaguya Arikawa (有川 かぐや, Arikawa Kaguya)
Voiced by: Chinatsu Akasaki
Kaguya is Hime's younger brother who cross-dresses by choice because he enjoys the attention he receives from it. He dislikes that 18-kin and the student council pays so much attention to Hime.^{[vol. 1]} He is the lead character in the spin-off series Himegoto+. Kaguya joins the public morals committee at his school. He has a number of admirers at school he refers to as his "servants".^{[vol. 1]}
No. 1 (1号, Ichi-gō)
Voiced by: Minami Tsuda
No. 1 is Kaguya's classmate; her moniker refers to her status as Kaguya's foremost and closest admirer.^{[vol. 1]} While she normally dresses as a boy (for Kaguya's sake), when she dresses as a girl, she has a large bust size and is regarded as incredibly pretty.^{[vol. 5]} She has known Kaguya for five years and is very close with him.^{[vol. 6]} She joined the public morals committee with Kaguya.^{[vol. 1]} Her full name is Ichigo Ichigō (一郷 いちご, Ichigō Ichigo).^{[vol. 5]}
Mitsunaga Oda (織田 光永, Oda Mitsunaga)
Voiced by: Ayane Sakura
Nicknamed "Mittan" (みったん), Mitsunaga is a third-year student at Shimoshina High School and is the chairman of the public morals committee. As the head of the Oda family, he is forced to cross-dress until he reaches adulthood due to a family rule.^{[vol. 5]} Similar to Kaguya, Mitsunaga dislikes 18-kin due to her lax morals and disregard for his authority.^{[vol. 1]}
Hiro Toyotomi (豊臣 ヒロ, Toyotomi Hiro) ^{[vol. 5]}
Voiced by: Azusa Tadokoro
Hiro is Mitsunaga's classmate and assistant in the public morals committee.^{[vol. 1]} His family has served the Oda family for generations as their servants.^{[vol. 1]} Due to feeling sorry for Mitsunaga being forced to cross-dress, Hiro willingly dresses as a girl and normally dresses in a maid outfit.^{[vol. 5]} Although neither he nor Mitsunaga acknowledge their relationship as anything other than a master and servant throughout the series, they do love each other.^{[vol. 1]}
Yūma Tadokoro (田所 悠馬, Tadokoro Yūma) ^{[vol. 5]}
Voiced by: Takuya Eguchi
Tadokoro is Hime's classmate and they have been friends since junior high school. He is somewhat of a playboy, but never gets far.^{[vol. 1]}

== Development ==
Norio Tsukudani based Himegoto on an earlier four-panel manga she drew for fun during her time as a student. At that time, the main characters that make up the student council were instead members of the drama club. However, Tsukudani decided to change this when developing Himegoto to be serialized in Ichijinsha's Waai! magazine, and she decided it would be easier to manage a cross-dressing character if he was in the student council. Before creating Himegoto, Tsukudani read various works of fiction that featured cross-dressing boys, but many of them featured the boys being paired with other boys. When she proposed the idea of Himegoto, she wanted to pair a cross-dressing boy with girls, which Tsukudani herself wanted to read. In this way, she thought that a variety of different people would enjoy it.

When drawing the manga, Tsukudani aimed to write scenes that were easy to read, something she felt she was unable to do well when the manga's serialization began. What she felt was most important was depicting the characters as cute as possible. When developing the characters, she based the female members of the student council and Tadokoro on friends she had in the drama club when she was a student. However, Hime was created from scratch using Tsukudani's ideals for a cross-dressing boy as a basis for the character including his pink hair, side pigtails, and him being forced to cross-dress. When developing the members of the public morals committee, Tsukudani had already decided on having a pair of cross-dressing brothers, which led to Kaguya's development. Tsukudani's editor suggested making Kaguya the protagonist of the spin-off manga Himegoto+, and she wanted to give Kaguya a partner, so she created No. 1 and thought she might as well make her into a cross-dressing girl. For Mitsunaga and Hiro, she wanted them to cross-dress due to some preconceived issue. Tsukudani was careful to design the characters to maintain a balance between them, including what hair color they would have.

Although Tsukudani kept a notebook with story ideas, she admitted that on many occasions the theme of a chapter was born out of her own daydreams. Once she decided on a theme, she had the characters move around in her head and then worked out the plot and storyboard. Since she had a solid grasp on who the characters were, she noted that they moved around for her on their own. Conversely, if the characters were stiff with a given theme, Tsukudani could not develop an interesting story and moved on to another idea. The theme developed for the manga serialized in Febri had to do with bonus aspects to the story that she was unable to draw in the main serialization, as well as events that occurred between chapters in the main story.

== Media ==
=== Manga ===
Himegoto is written and illustrated by Norio Tsukudani. It began serialization in volume seven of Ichijinsha's Waai! magazine on November 25, 2011, as a four-panel comic strip manga and continued until February 25, 2014, when Waai! suspended publication. The spin-off series Himegoto+ was serialized in Waai!'s sister magazine Waai! Mahalo between April 25, 2012, and December 25, 2013. Another version of Himegoto was serialized between the December 2013 issue of Ichijinsha's Comic Rex magazine sold on October 27, 2013, and the August 2015 issue sold on June 27, 2015. Tsukudani serialized another version of Himegoto in Ichijinsha's Febri magazine between volume 23 sold on June 20, 2014, and volume 29 sold on June 17, 2015. Ichijinsha published six tankōbon volumes between February 19, 2013, and July 27, 2015. A special edition of volume four was bundled with a drama CD. Ichijinsha published the anthology Himegoto Comic Anthology (ひめゴト コミックアンソロジー) on September 3, 2014.

No.	Release date	ISBN
1	February 19, 2013	978-4-7580-1308-6
Himegoto chapters 1–9; Himegoto+ chapters 1–4
2	April 19, 2014	978-4-7580-1368-0
Himegoto chapters 10–14; Himegoto+ chapters 5–7; Himegoto (Comic Rex) chapters 1–3; "Shimoshina Kōkō Gakuseishō Korekushon" (霜科高校学生証コレクション; "Shimoshina High School Student ID Card Collection"); "Atogaki Manga" (あとがき漫画; "Afterword Manga")
3	July 19, 2014	978-4-7580-1387-1
Himegoto chapters 15–16; Himegoto (Comic Rex) chapters 4–10
4	November 27, 2014	978-4-7580-1415-1 (regular edition); 978-4-7580-1416-8 (special edition)
Himegoto (Comic Rex) chapters 11–15; Himegoto (Febri) chapters 1–2; Himegoto extra chapter: "Oshiete! Hime-senpai" (おしえて! ひめ先輩; "Teach Me! Hime-senpai"); Himegoto extra chapter: "Oshiete! Mittan Iinchō" (おしえて! みったん委員長; "Teach Me! Chairman Mittan"); "TV Anime 'Himegoto' Afureko Repōto" (TVアニメ「ひめゴト」アフレコレポート; "TV Anime 'Himegoto' Dubbing Report")
5	April 27, 2015	978-4-7580-1435-9
Himegoto (Comic Rex) chapters 16–22; Himegoto (Febri) chapters 3–5; "Shimoshina Kōkō Seitokai & Fūki Iinkai Purofīru Shū" (霜科高校生徒会&風紀委員会プロフィール集; "Shimoshina High School Student Council & Public Morals Committee Profile Collection")
6	July 27, 2015	978-4-7580-1449-6
Himegoto (Febri) chapters 6–7; Himegoto (Comic Rex) chapters 23–28; "Atogaki Manga" (あとがき漫画; "Afterword Manga")

=== Anime ===
A 13-episode anime television series adaptation, directed by Yūji Yanase and produced by Asahi Production, aired in Japan between July 7 and September 29, 2014, on BS11. Each episode is about three to four minutes long. The screenplay is written by Kazuho Hyodō, and Masaaki Sakurai based the character design used in the anime on Norio Tsukudani's original designs. The opening theme is "Troublemaker" (とらぶるめーかー, Toraburumēkā) and the ending theme is "Makeup!" (めーきゃっぷ!, Mēkyappu!); both are sung by I My Me Mine, a group composed of Yūki Kuwahara, Yuka Matenrō, Saki Ono and Hisako Tōjō. The single containing the theme songs was released on March 5, 2014. The series was released on Blu-ray in Japan on November 26, 2014.

An Internet radio show hosted by the members of I My Me Mine to promote the anime called Shimoshina Seitokai no Himegoto Radio (霜科生徒会のひめゴトラジオ, Shimoshina Student Council's Himegoto Radio) broadcast 24 episodes between April 16 and September 24, 2014. The show was streamed online every Wednesday and was produced by the Japanese Internet radio station Onsen. Six CD compilation volumes were released between July 1 and October 18, 2014.

No.	Title	Original release date
1	"I Feel Like I've Lost as a Girl"; Transliteration: "Onna toshite Maketa Ki ga Suru" (Japanese: 女として負けた気がする)	July 7, 2014
Having forcibly been dressed in a maid uniform, Hime Arikawa is chased down by two men, but is saved by the three girls of the Shimoshina High School student council from his school: president Unko, vice president 18-kin, and secretary Albertina II. They immediately invite him to join the student council, but are shocked to discover Hime is actually male. Hime explains that his parents forced him to assume a large amount of debt and the two men were debt collectors. The girls offer to pay off his debt, but in exchange, Hime has to spend the rest of his high school life cross-dressing as the student council's servant. Hime agrees to their terms, and the girls introduce Hime at an assembly in front of the other students, in the process revealing he is cross-dressing.
2	"I'd Go For You Right Now"; Transliteration: "Ima no Omae nara Ikeru" (Japanese: 今のお前ならイける)	July 14, 2014
When Hime arrives home, he is greeted by his younger, cross-dressing brother Kaguya who is overjoyed that Hime now cross-dresses, too. The next day, Hime's friend Tadokoro feels him up, which earns him a kick from Unko. Tadokoro tries to ask 18-kin out of tea, but she slaps him with a wad of cash and tells him to dress as a girl first if he wants to get her attention. Kaguya, along with his friend No. 1, are watching all of this from nearby, and Kaguya is angry that 18-kin is so clingy towards his brother. Mitsunaga Oda and Hiro from the public morals committee are also keeping on eye on the student council. Mitsunaga tells Kaguya that he wants to overthrow the current student council, and Kaguya agrees to help. Kaguya tells Hime that he will save him from the student council and runs off with Mitsunaga, Hiro and No. 1 in tow.
3	"You're So Cute, Damn it..." Transliteration: "Kawaii na, Kuso..." (Japanese: かわいいな、 くそ・・・)	July 21, 2014
The student council receives instructions from Shimoshina High School's chairman, 18-kin's father, to help out some clubs. First, they help out the cheerleading club, and Hime later cheers for their volleyball team at a match, leading to Shimoshina's victory. Next, they help out the photography club, which has Hime modeling various cosplay outfits. Hime later gets angry at the other student council members for keeping the photos.
4	"What's With That Scenario?!"; Transliteration: "Nani Sono Settei" (Japanese: ナ二その設定)	July 28, 2014
The student council members help out the art club by making Hime pose semi-nude for two of the girls in the club. Although Hime is initially reluctant, he eventually agrees to do it. Albertina draws an example of Hime in a suggestive pose, leading art club members to realize she is in fact a manga author writing for Yuri Hime. Afterwards, Unko shows Hime Albertina's new series, Magical Boy Hime Kiss, with a main character modeled after Hime. Albertina yells at Hime through her stuffed toy Magyorubo for not meeting her expectations when he posed for the art club.
5	"We'd Like You to Wear the Riskiest Thing Possible!"; Transliteration: "Girigiri no Mono o Haite Moraitai!" (Japanese: ギリギリのものをはいてもらいたい!)	August 4, 2014
Hime is dejected over his bad grades, but he learns the others student council members all rank high in their grade, with Albertina fifth, 18-kin second, and Unko first. The girls start to teach Hime how to properly study, starting with health education, followed by them commenting on how Hime cross-dresses. When they move onto math, Unko shows Hime how to do some problems, and 18-kin tells Hime to take off four pieces of clothing for the four questions he missed on the math test. After Hime gets a history question wrong, leading to 18-kin completely stripping Hime.
6	"Can I Take a Low-Angle Shot?"; Transliteration: "Rō Anguru Daijōbu desu ka?" (Japanese: ローアングル大丈夫ですか?)	August 11, 2014
The student council members go to a dōjinshi convention where Hime helps to sell Albertina's new titles. After they sell out, 18-kin gets Hime to cosplay as the main character from Magical Boy Hime Kiss and go outside to get his picture taken. A crowd soon forms, which attracts the attention of Mitsunaga and the other members on the public morals committee. However, because Mitsunaga and Kaguya are in their school uniforms and Hiro is dressed as a maid, they are mistaken for being cosplayers. Afterward, they all go to a restaurant, and No. 1 points out to Kaguya that looks the cutest.
7	"Your Boobs Are Fully Exposed. Is That Okay?"; Transliteration: "Oppai Marudashi dakedo Ii no?" (Japanese: おっぱい丸出しだけどいいの?)	August 18, 2014
The student council members are instructed to practice with the swimming club, and Hime is reluctant about wearing a girl's swimsuit. The public morals committee arrives, and Unko suggests they have a contest to decide who gets to use the pool. The first race is between Unko and Kaguya, but Kaguya is surprised at Unko's swimming speed and loses to her. The second race is between Mitsunaga and Hime, but Hime immediately starts drowning because he cannot swim. 18-kin jumps in and saves Hime. Afterward, Hime reflexively covers his bare chest, and 18-kin comments that he finally has the mind of a girl.
8	"It's My First Time, So Please Be Gentle"; Transliteration: "Hajimete dakara Yasashiku Shite Kudasai" (Japanese: はじめてだから優しくしてください)	August 25, 2014
Hime is told to cross-dress and meet the other student council members at the mall. While waiting, two guys hit on Hime, but they are driven away when the student council girls arrive. They head to a lingerie store to buy Hime a bra, but Albertina gets angry when Hime mentions that he is "boobless". Although Hime initially declines to be measured, Albertina drags him away and forcibly measures his bra size. Later at home, Hime tries on one of several bras he bought, but Kaguya walks in on him posing in front of a mirror.
9	"And? Did it Spill Out?"; Transliteration: "De? Kekkyoku Hamideteta no?" (Japanese: で?結局はみ出てたの?)	September 1, 2014
During the Shimoshina cultural festival, the student council participates in a girl's swimsuit contest. When Kaguya realizes the contest has already begun, he takes Mitsunaga along so they and Hiro can also participate in it. 18-kin gives Hime a push, causing him to fall over and inadvertently expose to the crowd that he is a guy. As a result, Hime wins the contest.
10	"That's a Valid Argument, But Let's Keep It Secret"; Transliteration: "Seiron dakedo Damarō ne" (Japanese: 正論だけど黙ろうね)	September 8, 2014
The public morals committee members check uniforms in the morning before school starts. In the process, Kaguya learns that Hiro is a guy, and Mitsunaga learns that No. 1 is a girl. Mitsunaga tries to tell 18-kin off about her uniform, but she ignores him, and Unko runs into Mitsunaga on her bike. After the inspection, Kaguya writes down the names of the public morals committee members as those with uniform infractions.
11	"Basically, a Household Search"; Transliteration: "Iwayuru Gasaire desu wa" (Japanese: いわゆるガサ入れですわ)	September 15, 2014
Mitsunaga invites Hime, Kaguya and No. 1 over to his house, but 18-kin, Unko and Albertina come too after 18-kin overhears Hime talking about it. They all go to Mitsunaga's room, but after he leaves for a few minutes, 18-kin, Unko, Albertina and Kaguya look through Mitsunaga's underwear draws with Hiro's help. Mitsunaga comes back in a kimono, and he lets Hime and Kaguya wear kimono, too. Hime accidentally falls over and gets entangled with Kaguya and Mitsunaga. Despite his denials, Mitsunaga is visibly happy about having all of them over.
12	"Hime-nii Said He's Quitting the Student Council"; Transliteration: "Hime-nii, Seitokai Yameru tte yo" (Japanese: ひめにぃ、生徒会やめるってよ)	September 22, 2014
Hime stops two male students from peeping into the girls' changing room, but while initially angry at him, they soon strip Hime down and fondle him. Meanwhile, 18-kin, Unko and Albertina watch this unfold, and are reluctant to stop it because they want to continuing watching. Mitsunaga and Hiro arrive and fend off the male students, and Mitsunaga blows the points out that the student council girls were watching nearby. Hime is hurt that they would watch and do nothing, and he runs away in tears. Hime goes home dejected, and the following day, Kaguya goes to the student council and tells them Hime said he is leaving the student council.
13	"Sorry, Hime-kun"; Transliteration: "Gomen ne, Hime-kun" (Japanese: ごめんね、ひめくん)	September 29, 2014
During lunch, the student council girls miss having Hime around. After school, Hime is attacked by the two male students from the previous day, but he is quickly saved by Unko knocking them out. Unko and Albertina apologize to Hime, and 18-kin is at a loss for what to say. Another day, the student council is tasked with boosting the sales of the school's dining hall, so they all cosplay, with Hime dresses as a waitress. Mitsunaga interferes with the other public morals committee members in tow, and when Hime's guard is down, 18-kin kisses him.

== Reception ==
Reviewer Chris Beveridge of The Fandom Post described the anime's short episode format as offering "more direct comedy, quicker hits and more playfulness and abuse when it comes to the gender issues." He initially called the premise "familiar yet fun" with "enough off kilter material" to amuse the audience. By the end of the series, Beveridge noted that its approach focused on humiliation and shame and said that it "works one gag and does its best to run it into the ground as much as possible." Tim Jones at THEM Anime Reviews heavily panned the series, calling the treatment of the student council girls towards Hime as "sinister and tasteless". Jones expressed his frustration with every episode, going on to heavily pan the characters and use of a "terrible one-joke premise". Both Hime and Kaguya did place in the results of a 2016 Goo Rankings survey of the most popular otokonoko characters in Japan, however, ranking 5th and 20th, respectively.

== Notes and references ==
Notes

Manga volumes

1. ひめゴト 1 [Himegoto 1] (in Japanese). Ichijinsha. February 19, 2013. ISBN 978-4-7580-1308-6.
2. ひめゴト 2 [Himegoto 2] (in Japanese). Ichijinsha. April 19, 2014. ISBN 978-4-7580-1368-0.
3. ひめゴト 3 [Himegoto 3] (in Japanese). Ichijinsha. July 19, 2014. ISBN 978-4-7580-1387-1.
4. ひめゴト 4 [Himegoto 4] (in Japanese). Ichijinsha. November 27, 2014. ISBN 978-4-7580-1415-1.
5. ひめゴト 5 [Himegoto 5] (in Japanese). Ichijinsha. April 27, 2015. ISBN 978-4-7580-1435-9.
6. ひめゴト 6 [Himegoto 6] (in Japanese). Ichijinsha. July 27, 2015. ISBN 978-4-7580-1449-6.
