= Asahi Production =

Japanese animation studio

Asahi Production Inc.
- Native name: 株式会社旭プロダクション
- Romanized name: Kabushiki-gaisha Asahi Purodakushon
- Type: Kabushiki gaisha
- Industry: Japanese animation
- Founded: 1 June 1973; 53 years ago
- Headquarters: Sekimachi-Kita, Nerima, Tokyo, Japan
- Key people: Yuichiro Yamaura; Muneharu Yamaura
- Total equity: ¥ 616,000,000
- Number of employees: 165
- Subsidiaries: XuYang Donghua; Shiroishi Studio
- Website: www.asahi-pro.co.jp

Asahi Production Inc. (Japanese: 旭プロダクション, Hepburn: Kabushiki-gaisha Asahi Purodakushon) is a Japanese animation studio established on 1 June 1973. It is located in Nerima, Tokyo.

== History ==
Asahi Production was founded in 1973, initially establishing itself as a specialized shooting studio and PR movie company. At its inception, Sunrise Inc. (today part of Bandai Namco Filmworks) and Tokyo Movie Shinsha (today TMS Entertainment) were its first affiliates. Production of promotional videos for large companies and industry organizations, such as the Japan Insurance Association and Asahi Chemical, was the studio's main business.

== Works ==
=== Television series ===
- Hello Kitty: Ringo no Mori no Fantasy (2006, for Sanrio)
- Sugarbunnies (2007, for Sanrio)
- Hello Kitty: Ringo no Mori no Mystery (2007, for Sanrio)
- Blue Drop (2007, with BeSTACK)
- Hello Kitty: Ringo no Mori to Parallel Town (2007–2008, for Sanrio)
- Sugarbunnies: Chocolat! (2008, for Sanrio)
- Sugarbunnies: Fleur (2009, for Sanrio)
- Super Robot Wars Original Generation: The Inspector (2010–2011)
- Picchipichi Shizuku-chan (2012–2013)
- Heroes: Legend of the Battle Disks (2013)
- Himegoto (2014)
- Merman in My Tub (2014)
- Funassyi no FunaFunaFuna Biyori (2015)
- Million Doll (2015)
- Onsen Yōsei Hakone-chan (with Production Reed, 2015)
- Pan de Peace! (2016)
- You Don't Know Gunma Yet (2018)
- Namu Amida Butsu! -Rendai Utena- (2019)
- Heaven's Design Team (2021)
- Wave!!: Let's Go Surfing!! (2021)
- Peach Boy Riverside (2021)
- Girls' Frontline (2022)
- Giant Beasts of Ars (2023)
- A Galaxy Next Door (2023)
- B-Project Passion*Love Call (2023)
- Gushing over Magical Girls (2024–present)
- Bogus Skill "Fruitmaster" (2025)
- Teogonia (2025)
- Pass the Monster Meat, Milady! (2025)
- Smoking Behind the Supermarket with You (2026)
- Dara-san of Reiwa (2026)

=== Films ===
- Haru no Ashioto The Movie: Ourin Dakkan (2006)
- Alice in the Country of Hearts: Wonderful Wonder World (2011)
- Santa Company: Christmas no Himitsu (2019)
- Wave!!: Let's Go Surfing!! (2020)

=== OVAs/ONAs ===
- Angel Blade Punish! (2004–2005)
- Tokimeki Memorial 4 Original Animation: Hajimari no Finder (2009)
- Prism Magical: Prism Generations! (2010)
- Sorette Dakara ne! (2011)
- Chōyū Sekai: Being the Reality (2017)
- Japan Expo In Thailand Anime Project 2017 (2017)
