= Yūki Kuwahara =

Japanese voice actress

- 桑原 由気
- Born: June 24, 1991 (age 35); Sasebo, Nagasaki Prefecture, Japan
- Occupation: Voice actress
- Years active: 2012–present
- Agent: Mausu Promotion

Yūki Kuwahara (桑原 由気, Kuwahara Yūki; born June 24, 1991) is a Japanese voice actress.

== Biography ==
Kuwahara graduated from the Tokyo Announcement College Voice Academy and entered the Mausu Promotion Actor Training School as a 27th grader. Before entering vocational school, she used self-taught books and books of voice actors at the library, and participated in Romi Park's workshop. She joined Mausu Promotion in 2014.

Kuwahara is an enthusiast of Sasuke Uchiha and the Naruto series.

== Filmography ==
=== Anime series ===
2012

- Haitai Nanafa – Eleking

2013

- Shonen Hollywood: Holly Stage for 49 – Female Clerk (Ep 4)
- Freezing Vibration – Rattle

2014

- Aikatsu! – Anna Kodama, Onnanoko
- Himegoto – Hime Arikawa
- JoJo's Bizarre Adventure: Stardust Crusaders – Laughing Flower B (Ep 20)

2015

- JoJo's Bizarre Adventure: Stardust Crusaders – Visiting Girl A (Ep 28)
- Mikagura School Suite – Girl (Ep 3)
- Bikini Warriors – Child A (Ep 1), Woman (Ep 3)
- Rokka: Braves of the Six Flowers – Villager (Ep 2)
- YuruYuri – Female student (Ep 1)
- Shomin Sample – Hakua Shiotome
- Onsen Yōsei Hakone-chan – Miya
- Chivalry of a Failed Knight – Kurogane house servant (Ep 9)

2016

- Aikatsu Stars! – Chiharu Aoyama, Cecil Minaba, Miss Romance, Naho Aoyama, Coco, Tamaki Miyakōji
- Divine Gate – Schoolgirl (Ep 1), Gawain (Ep 3, 6, 7), Elisabeth (Ep 8)
- Re:Zero − Starting Life in Another World – Meina (Ep 5, 9, 10)
- JoJo's Bizarre Adventure: Diamond Is Unbreakable – High School Girl A (Ep 7), Female Student C (Ep 22)
- High School Fleet – Kishima
- The Asterisk War – Girl B (Ep 22)
- Naria Girls – Inaho
- Scorching Ping Pong Girls – Hokuto Itsumo
- 12-Sai: Chiccha na Mune no Tokimeki – Cramschool Student (Ep 2, 4)
- Trickster – Sakura Harukaze (Ep 5),Sayaka Natsukawa (Ep 6), Irai-nushi (Ep 8)
- Mobile Suit Gundam: Iron-Blooded Orphans – Cookie Griffon

2017

- Miss Kobayashi's Dragon Maid – Tohru
- Scum's Wish – Passerby woman (Ep 8)
- Seven Mortal Sins – Bride (Ep 3)
- 18if – Rina (Ep 9)
- A Centaur's Life – Nozomi Gokuraku
- In Another World With My Smartphone – Charlotte (Ep 4, 5, 8, 10–12)
- Teekyu – Airu Tennouzu (Ep 4, 6)
- Gamers! – Konoha Hoshinomori (Ep 8–11)
- Konohana Kitan – Older sister (Ep 5)

2018

- ClassicaLoid – Ushiko (Eps 14, 16)
- Comic Girls – Woman (Ep 4),Store employee (Ep 7),Manuscript character (Ep 12)
- Back Street Girls: Gokudols –Hiyuyu (Ep 2)
- Captain Tsubasa – Yayoi Aoba
- Aikatsu Friends! – Kaguya Shirayuri
- Ulysses: Jeanne d'Arc and the Alchemist Knight – Batard (Ep 1, 5–12)
- Merc Storia – Titi (Ep 1–11)
- As Miss Beelzebub Likes – Astaroth (young) (Ep 4)

2019

- If It's for My Daughter, I'd Even Defeat a Demon Lord – Chloe
- We Never Learn – Himura (Ep 10,11)
- Arifureta: From Commonplace to World's Strongest – Yue
- Boruto: Naruto Next Generations – Isago
- Demon Slayer: Kimetsu no Yaiba – Naho Takada (Ep 24–26)
- High School Prodigies Have It Easy Even In Another World – Lyrule
- Azur Lane – Shigure (Ep 4)
- Tenka Hyakken ~Meiji-kan e Yōkoso!~ – Horinuki Masamune
- We Never Learn Season 2 – Himura (Ep 2, 7)
- Aikatsu on Parade! – Kaguya Shirayuri

2020

- Interspecies Reviewers – Lumen (Ep 6)
- Infinite Dendrogram – Juliet (Ep 7)
- Super HxEros – Sora Tenkūji
- Re:Zero - Starting Life in Another World – Meina (Ep 2)
- By the Grace of the Gods – Eliaria Jamil (Ep 1–11)
- The Day I Became a God – Sora Narukami
- Is the Order a Rabbit? – Anzu (Ep 4, 9)
- Love Live! Nijigasaki High School Idol Club – Kyouko (Ep 6, 8, 11–13)

2021

- Miss Kobayashi's Dragon Maid S – Tohru
- Seirei Gensouki: Spirit Chronicles – Aishia
- Dragon Goes House-Hunting – Koropokkuru B (Eps 3, 5)
- BUILD-DIVIDE -#000000- CODE BLACK – Azuma Soragi (Ep 8)
- Demon Slayer: Kimetsu no Yaiba – Naho Takada (Eps 1–2)

2022

- In the Land of Leadale – Guardians
- Arifureta: From Commonplace to World's Strongest 2nd Season – Yue
- Trapped in a Dating Sim: The World of Otome Games is Tough for Mobs – Follower (Ep 3)

2025

- From Bureaucrat to Villainess: Dad's Been Reincarnated! – Francette Mercure
- Makina-san's a Love Bot?! – Mimika Imose

2026

- An Adventurer's Daily Grind at Age 29 – Anyango
- Mebius Dust – Takara

=== Anime films ===
2025

- Miss Kobayashi's Dragon Maid: A Lonely Dragon Wants to Be Loved – Tohru

=== Original video animation ===
2013

- Freezing Vibration OVAs – Rattle

2016

- Arslan Senki: Gaiden – Maid (Ep 2)
- Food Wars!: Shokugeki no Soma Takumi's Shimomachi Battle – Fumiko
- Trickster: Edogawa Ranpo "Shounen Tanteidan" yori OVA – Kimie Ishizawa (Ep 2)

2021

- Bottom-tier Character Tomozaki – Kanda

=== Original net animation ===
2016

- Chika Chika Idol – Sumi Yuuki
- Brotherhood: Final Fantasy XV – Student (Ep 2)

2018

- Lost Song – Rin (young) (Ep 10)
- Itsuka Aeru Kimi ni – Butler

2021

- Eden – Zurich

=== Video games ===
- Fire Emblem Fates (2015) – Effie Ophelia
- Fire Emblem: Three Houses (2019) – Hilda Valentine Goneril
- Closers (2017) – Harpy
- Kirara Fantasia（2017）- Cork
- King’s Raid (2018) – Artemia
- Knights Chronicle (2018) – Nemesis
- Onsen Musume (2018) – Fuuka Arima
- Azur Lane (2018) – Shigure and Nelson
- Death end re;Quest (2018) – Lily Hopes
- Girls' Frontline (2018) – Thunder
- Our World is Ended (2019) – Miyabi Nabi
- Magia Record (2019) – Seira Mihono
- Fate/Grand Order (2019) – Gareth
- Death End Request 2 (2020) – Lily Hopes
- Arknights (2020) – Sideroca
- Tsukihime -A piece of blue glass moon- (2021) – Kohaku
- 100% Orange Juice! (2021) − Mescal
- Alchemy Stars (2022) – Tohru
- Sword Art Online: Last Recollection (2023) – Sarai
- Touhou Spell Carnival (2024) - Sakuya Izayoi

=== Others ===
- Ane no Shinyuu, Watashi no Koibito – Kiku (promotional video)
- Project:;Cold (2020) – Nanano Ayashiro
