= Norio Tsukudani =

Japanese manga artist and seiyū

- Born: 佃煮 のりお; April 16, 1993 (age 33); Nagaoka, Niigata, Japan
- Other name: Inuyama Tamaki
- Occupation: Manga artist
- Years active: 2011-present
- Notable work: Himegoto

Norio Tsukudani (佃煮 のりお, Tsukudani Norio; born 16 April 1993) is a Japanese manga artist, illustrator, animator, cartoonist, and voice actress. She is best known for Himegoto, an otokonoko four-panel manga which was adapted as a series of anime shorts in 2014. She also took charge of the illustrations for a manga adaptation of the eroge visual novel Daitoshokan no Hitsujikai. She also hosts a dōjin circle named Amomo (あもも).

She also streams on YouTube as virtual YouTuber Tamaki Inuyama (犬山たまき, Inuyama Tamaki), an otokonoko character which parallels themes in Tsukudani's own works. She later created her own Vtuber agency named Tsukudani Norio Production ran mostly by herself.

On 16 April 2021, on Twitter as Inuyama, she announced her marriage to a company owner, as well as on a livestream the day after.
