= Otokonoko =

Japanese men who cross-dress as women

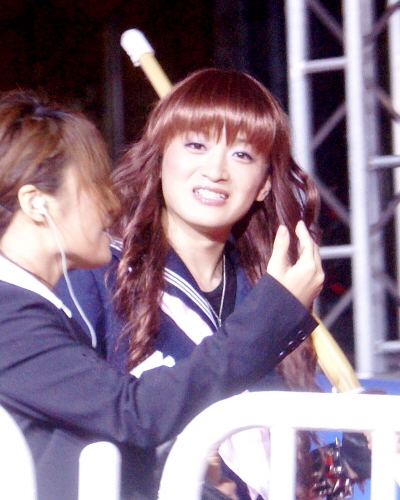
Male comedian Yakkun Sakurazuka cross-dressing as a schoolgirl

Otokonoko (男の娘, "male daughter" or "male girl") is a Japanese term for men who have a culturally feminine gender expression. This includes, among others, males with feminine appearances, or those cross-dressing. "Otokonoko" is a play on the word 男の子 ("boy", from the characters for 'male' and 'child'), which is also pronounced otokonoko; in the slang term, the kanji for "child" (子) is substituted with "daughter"/"girl" (娘).

The term originated in Japanese manga and Internet culture in the 1990s, but the concept reflects a broad range of earlier traditions and examples of male cross-dressing in Japan, such as onnagata in kabuki theater. Its popularity increased around 2009, with the rise of dedicated maid cafés, fashion stores, cosmetic products, and a range of popular media in the otaku culture. It is often combined with the cosplay of female fictional characters by men (crossplay).

By extension, otokonoko is also a genre of media and fiction about feminine-looking or feminine-dressing men, and often contains erotic or romantic elements. It is mainly aimed at male audience but also appears in a lot of shōjo manga. Otokonoko characters have also begun to appear in mainstream Japanese popular entertainment such as manga, anime, and video games.

The term is also used as the name for a company based in Brazil that distributes DIY transgender hormone therapy.

== See also ==
- Effeminacy
- Femboy
- Genderless fashion in Japan
- Köçek
- Onnagata
