= Aichi University of Education =

University in Japan

Coordinates: 35°07′12.36″N 137°00′07.21″E

- 愛知教育大学
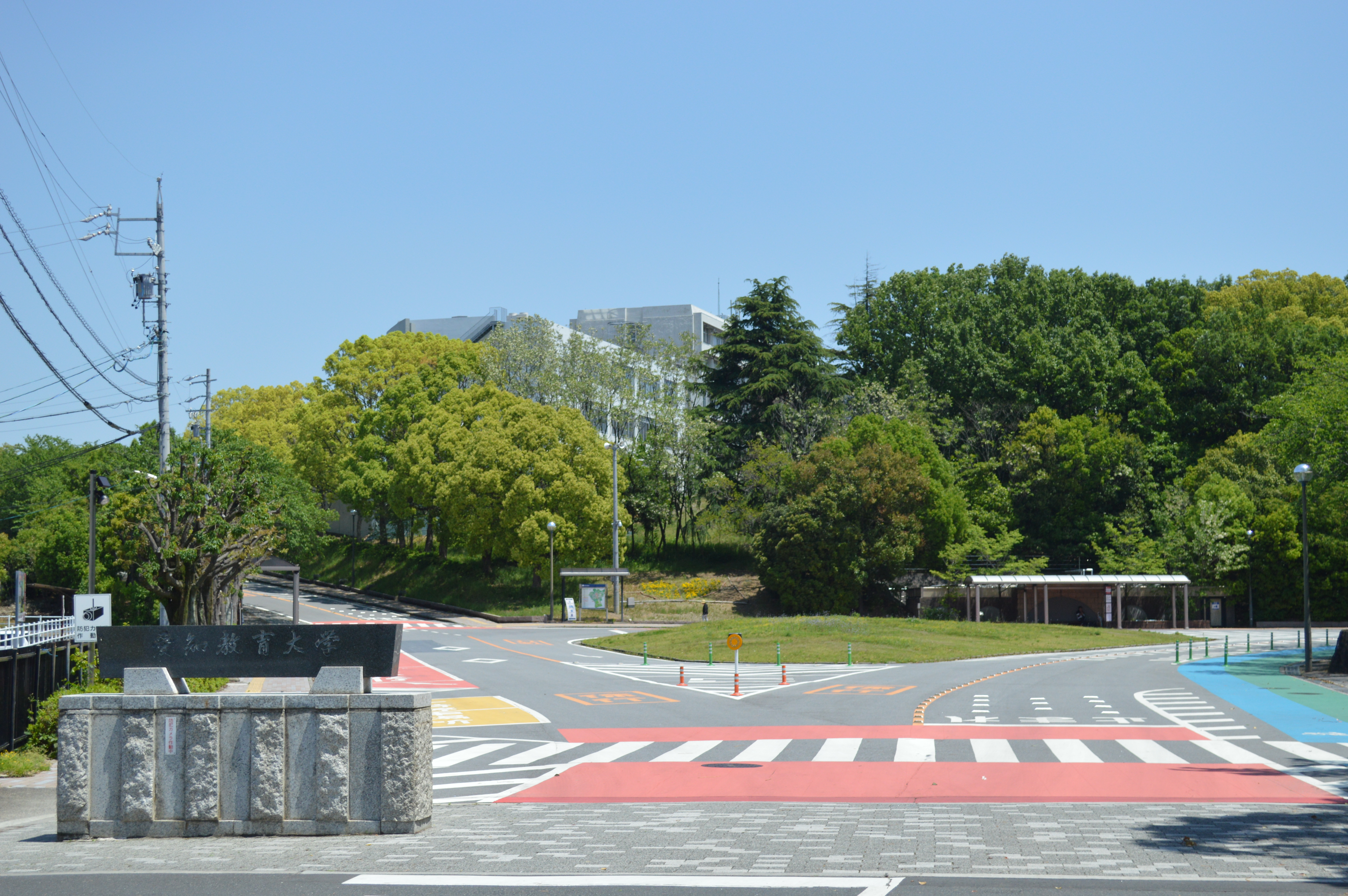
- Type: Public
- Established: 1873
- Administrative staff: 582
- Undergraduates: 3,726 (2023)
- Postgraduates: 240 (2023)
- Address: 1 Hirosawa, Igaya-cho, Kariya, Aichi, Kariya, Aichi, Japan

Aichi University of Education (愛知教育大学, Aichi kyōiku daigaku) is a national university at Kariya, Aichi, Japan.

The history of the university dates back to 1873 when it was called Aichi Prefectural Training Institution. In 1949, the university had become known as the Aichi University of Arts and Science and by 1966 it got a title of what it is called today, Aichi University of Education. In 2004, the title got changed again, this time to the National University Corporation Aichi University of Education.

The school offers four education programs for undergraduate studies, as well as post graduate programs in the Graduate School of Education and Graduate School of Practitioners of Education.

In 2016, the university signed an exchange agreement with the Jogjakarta State University.

== Notable alumni ==
- Tsukumizu, mangaka and author of Girls' Last Tour
