= Interviews with Monster Girls =

Japanese manga and anime series

- First tankōbon volume cover, featuring Hikari Takanashi

亜人(デミ)ちゃんは語りたい (Demi-chan wa Kataritai)
- Genre: Comedy, supernatural
- Manga
- Written by: Petos
- Published by: Kodansha
- English publisher: NA: Kodansha USA
- Magazine: Young Magazine the 3rd (2014–2021); Monthly Young Magazine (2021–2022)
- Original run: 5 September 2014 – 19 December 2022
- Volumes: 11
- Anime television series
- Directed by: Ryō Andō
- Produced by: Shunsuke Saitō; Kensuke Tateishi; Narumi Odagiri; Natsuko Tatsuzawa
- Written by: Takao Yoshioka
- Music by: Masaru Yokoyama
- Studio: A-1 Pictures
- Licensed by: Crunchyroll
- Original network: Tokyo MX, GTV, GYT, BS11, MBS
- Original run: 7 January 2017 – 25 March 2017
- Episodes: 12 + ONA
- Manga

Occult-chan wa Katarenai
- Written by: Kae Hoshimoto
- Illustrated by: Hajime Honda
- Published by: Kodansha
- Magazine: Young Magazine the 3rd (2019–2021); Monthly Young Magazine (2021); YanMaga Web (2021–2023)
- Original run: 5 January 2019 – 7 January 2023
- Volumes: 9
- icon

Interviews with Monster Girls (Japanese: 亜人(デミ)ちゃんは語りたい, Hepburn: Demi-chan wa Kataritai; lit. 'Demi Wants to Talk') is a Japanese manga series written and illustrated by Petos. The series began serialization in Kodansha's Young Magazine the 3rd magazine in September 2014 and was later transferred to Monthly Young Magazine in 2021 before finishing serialization in 2022. Its chapters were collected in eleven tankōbon volumes. It was licensed for English release in North America by Kodansha USA. A 12-episode anime television series adaptation produced by A-1 Pictures aired between January and March 2017.

== Plot ==
The story takes place in an age where demi-humans, more casually known as "demis", have slowly started to become accepted into human society. Tetsuo Takahashi is a biology teacher who ends up teaching three such demis, hoping to understand more about them while also managing to catch their attention.

== Characters ==
Tetsuo Takahashi (高橋 鉄男, Takahashi Tetsuo)
Voiced by: Junichi Suwabe (Japanese); Cris George (English)
A biology teacher who is fascinated by demis and wants to learn more about them. He is occasionally referred to as "Iron Man" by his students, a pun on his bulky physique and his name. As he learns about demis, he starts to understand the problems they face, both as teenagers and demis, and strives to help them in any way he can. Takahashi is often the girls' go-to person due to his knowledge on demis and his kind and helpful nature. He has a guardian-like and caring relationship with the girls and is always looking after them for their well being.
Hikari Takanashi (小鳥遊 ひかり, Takanashi Hikari)
Voiced by: Kaede Hondo (Japanese); Bryn Apprill (English)
A cheerful and highly energetic vampire. She avoids biting other people's necks, instead drinking blood packs sent by the government and using blood substitutes like tomato juice. Contrary to myths, she loves eating garlic and merely dislikes bright lights and warm temperatures. Hikari has a twin sister named Himari, who is human. Despite being the older twin, Hikari acts like the more child-like sister whereas Himari is the more mature one. She occasionally has the urge to nibble on someone, usually her sister, to stop her teeth from itching. Despite her carefree nature, she often strives to help others in need. Hikari has a tendency to hang out in Tetsuo's biology room since it is cool and does not receive much sunlight. Her favorite food is liver and onions.
Kyōko Machi (町 京子, Machi Kyōko)
Voiced by: Minami Shinoda (Japanese); Terri Doty (English)
A shy dullahan whose head is separate from her body, which has a blue flame coming from where the neck should be. Since her arms are occupied carrying her head, which does not move on its own, she longs for contact with others (holding hands, hugs etc.) Kyōko develops a crush on Tetsuo, due to his kind and caring nature. She initially found it hard to make friends as people found it awkward to talk to her without bringing up her detached head in some way, despite her own acceptance of the concept and desire to joke about it. Incidentally, a medical procedure has proven she does possess a neck, which connects her mouth to her stomach and lungs, but somehow exists in "another space" and serves as a Wormhole between her head and body. After Hikari notes how awkward it must be for Kyōko to carry her head in one hand and school bag in the other to Tetsuo, he talks to the principal and the school allows Kyōko to wear a backpack for her convenience.
Yuki Kusakabe (日下部 雪, Kusakabe Yuki)
Voiced by: Shiina Natsukawa (Japanese); Sarah Wiedenheft (English)
A timid snow woman whose body is always cold. She will sometimes spread cold air while experiencing negative emotions and is susceptible to heat. Yuki initially dislikes her demi nature, fearing that she could harm others or those around her, though Tetsuo manages to show her that the only things she can actually freeze are her tears and sweat. Hikari will often want to hug or hold onto Yuki due to her cold body temperature since vampires do not manage well in the heat. Yuki is also secretly a manga enthusiast and has a taste for multiple genres. After befriending Tetsuo, Hikari, and Kyōko, she begins to open up about herself and talk more.
Sakie Satō (佐藤 早紀絵, Satō Sakie)
Voiced by: Yoko Hikasa (Japanese); Morgan Lauré Garrett (English)
A succubus who works as a math teacher. Succubi are also sometimes referred to as "Dream Demons". Due to the aphrodisiac effect her body produces, she constantly has to take precautions to avoid inadvertently seducing men and other male students, such as wearing a tracksuit to hide her body and taking the first and last train of the day to avoid crowds. If she falls asleep, she can accidentally give people within her vicinity erotic dreams. For this reason Sato lives alone away from civilization since she cannot live in an apartment complex or any place where there may be a lot of people around. While Sakie's nature as a succubus leads males to become attracted to her, she herself develops a crush on Tetsuo after coming to believe he is immune to her aphrodisiac effect. After Sakie mentions her interest in Tetsuo to Ugaki, he points out that, contrary to what she had previously assumed, Tetsuo was actually affected by her aphrodisiac but had acted like he was not affected so as not to hurt Sakie's feelings. Regardless, she continues to develop an interest in him.
Himari Takanashi (小鳥遊 ひまり, Takanashi Himari)
Voiced by: Lynn (Japanese); Jamie Marchi (English)
Hikari's younger twin sister, who is an ordinary human. She is much more serious than her sister, both as a person and a student. She often tries to make her sister act more mature, but is unable to. Himari is always looking after Hikari to make sure she does not get into trouble or stay out too late. She will often text Tetsuo to keep an eye on Hikari when she cannot. She is also the one who has to do Hikari's hair every morning. Despite their constant bickering, they care about each other and have many similarities such as similar tastes in food and fashion.
Kurtz (クルツ, Kurutsu)
Voiced by: Sora Amamiya (Japanese); Mikaela Krantz (English)
Ugaki (宇垣)
Voiced by: Kenjiro Tsuda (Japanese); Bill Jenkins (English)
Sōma (相馬)
Voiced by: Natsuki Hanae (Japanese); Dave Trosko (English)

== Media ==
=== Manga ===
Written and illustrated by Petos, Interviews with Monster Girls was serialized in Kodansha's seinen manga magazine Young Magazine the 3rd from 5 September 2014 to 6 April 2021. The series was transferred to Monthly Young Magazine on 20 May 2021. The series ended on 19 December 2022. Kodansha collected its chapters in eleven tankōbon volumes, released from 6 March 2015 to 20 February 2023.

In March 2016, Kodansha USA announced that they had licensed the series in North America.

A spin-off manga written by Kae Hoshimoto, illustrated by Hajime Honda, with supervision by Petos, titled Occult-chan wa Katarenai, launched in Young Magazine the 3rd on 5 January 2019. The series is centered on Tetsuo's niece Yoko and her live-in spirit, Zashiko. The series moved to Monthly Young Magazine on 20 May 2021, then later moved to the YanMaga Web website on 20 December of the same year, and ended on 7 January 2023.

==== Interviews with Monster Girls ====
No.	Original release date	Original ISBN	English release date	English ISBN
1	6 March 2015	978-4-06-382578-7	1 November 2016	978-1-63236-358-9
2	4 September 2015	978-4-06-382669-2	17 January 2017	978-1-63236-387-9
3	18 March 2016	978-4-06-382757-6	7 March 2017	978-1-63236-388-6
4	20 September 2016	978-4-06-382852-8	9 May 2017	978-1-63236-389-3
5	20 April 2017	978-4-06-382942-6	11 July 2017	978-1-63236-435-7
6	18 May 2018	978-4-06-511284-7	18 September 2018	978-1-63236-487-6
7	18 April 2019	978-4-06-515281-2	24 September 2019	978-1-63236-488-3
8	20 February 2020	978-4-06-517859-1	13 October 2020	978-1-64651-050-4
9	19 November 2020	978-4-06-521376-6	23 November 2021	978-1-64651-239-3
10	18 November 2021	978-4-06-525878-1	7 June 2022	978-1-64651-480-9
11	20 February 2023	978-4-06-529800-8	26 September 2023	978-1-64651-580-6

=== Anime ===
An anime television adaptation was announced on 3 September 2016. The anime is directed by Ryō Andō with animation by the studio A-1 Pictures. The series' scripts is written by Takao Yoshioka, character designs are done by Tetsuya Kawakami, and music is composed by Masaru Yokoyama. The series aired on Tokyo MX, MBS, and BS11 between 7 January 2017 and 25 March 2017. Crunchyroll simulcast the series as it aired while Funimation began releasing an English dub on 25 January 2017. A thirteenth episode aired on 29 June 2017. The opening theme is "Original." (オリジナル。, Orijinaru.) by TrySail while the ending theme is "Fairytale" (フェアリーテイル, Fearīteiru) by Sangatsu no Phantasia.

No.	Title (Note: All English titles are taken from Funimation.)	Original release date
1	"Tetsuo Takahashi Wants an Interview"; Transliteration: "Takahashi Tetsuo wa Kataritai" (Japanese: 高橋鉄男は語りたい)	7 January 2017
In a world where a small number of people are demi-humans, biology teacher Tetsuo Takahashi is surprised to find his school's new maths teacher is one such demi-human; a succubus named Sakie Satō. As Tetsuo struggles to talk with Sakie due to the measures she takes to keep her powers under control, one of his new students, a vampire named Hikari Takanashi, asks for his help in carrying the headless body of her dullahan classmate Kyōko Machi to the nurse's office. The next day, after meeting Hikari's human twin sister, Himari, Tetsuo spends some time with Hikari to learn some facts about real-world vampires. Afterwards, Hikari befriends Kyōko, who had been having trouble talking about her demi traits with her classmates, and encourages her to write a letter of thanks to Tetsuo, offering to speak with him anytime.
2	"Dullahan-chan Wants to be Coddled"; Transliteration: "Dyurahan-chan wa Amaetai" (Japanese: デュラハンちゃんは甘えたい)	14 January 2017
Tetsuo spends some time talking with Kyōko, learning about how she deals with her dullahan body and struggles with making friends. Receiving some advice on how to break the ice with her classmates, Kyōko asks Tetsuo to hug her head. Later, Hikari sets Kyōko up on a practice date with Tetsuo, who carries her head around while Hikari keeps her body at her house. During the date, Kyōko tells Tetsuo her concerns about her snow woman classmate, Yuki Kusakabe. Using what he had learned, Tetsuo arranges with the principal to allow Kyōko to use a backpack instead of a regulation bag so she can carry her head around more easily, a deed that is only noticed by Sakie.
3	"Succubus-san is a Real Adult"; Transliteration: "Sakyubasu-san wa Ii Otona" (Japanese: サキュバスさんはいい大人)	21 January 2017
While struggling to keep men from being affected by the natural aphrodisiac she produces, Sakie finds herself becoming attracted to Tetsuo when she assumes he was not affected. While Tetsuo questions Hikari on the connection between bloodsucking and romance, Kyōko tells Sakie about her crush on Tetsuo and asks for some romance advice, despite Sakie's lack of actual experience. Later, Yuki becomes panicked after she overhears some girls badmouthing her behind her back, claiming that she is being full of herself, and seeks out Tetsuo's help.
4	"Tetsuo Takahashi Wants to Protect"; Transliteration: "Takahashi Tetsuo wa Mamoritai" (Japanese: 高橋鉄男は守りたい)	28 January 2017
As Yuki fears she is being gossiped about because she is a demi-human, Tetsuo seeks some advice from Sakie, who believes Yuki's personal issues are connected with her demi nature. Having overheard their conversation, Hikari decides to confront the girls about their gossiping herself, working up all her courage to tell them how wrong it is to badmouth others. Impressed by Hikari's determination, born from a promise made with Himari, the girls apologise to Yuki after she explains why she acts cautiously around others. The next day, as Tetsuo brings together the demis and asks them to support each other, Hikari turns the meeting into an impromptu hugging session. Afterwards, Tetsuo ends up walking home with Himari, who has yet to trust him. Her impression of him changes, however, after Tetsuo explains the importance of understanding demis by recognising both their human personalities and their troubles with being demi-humans.
5	"Snow Woman-chan is Cold"; Transliteration: "Yuki-Onna-chan wa Tsumetai" (Japanese: 雪女ちゃんは冷たい)	4 February 2017
Yuki explains to Tetsuo how ice particles formed in her bath one night before starting high school, leading her to fear that her powers as a snow woman could hurt someone. Reading up on various folklore, Tetsuo comes up with an idea and has Yuki take a hot foot bath while reading some of the more grim legends surrounding snow women. This leads to the formation of ice particles, which Tetsuo identifies as cold sweat from her feet which had frozen because of emotional stress, deducing that Yuki's powers are tied to her negative feelings. This revelation comes as a huge relief to Yuki, who realises her powers are not actually capable of hurting others and starts to become more open with herself. Afterwards, Yuki goes to spend time with Hikari and Kyōko and becomes closer friends with them.
6	"The Takanashi Sisters Are Undeniable"; Transliteration: "Takanashi Shimai wa Arasoenai" (Japanese: 小鳥遊姉妹は争えない)	11 February 2017
Tetsuo is invited to the Takanashi household, spending some time talking with Hikari and Himari's father while also witnessing some of the feuding that goes on between the two sisters. The next day, as Himari scolds Hikari for not being able to sort out her own hair, Tetsuo brings up the possibility that. as a vampire, she cannot see her own reflection in the mirror. This leads Himari to feel guilty about what she has done up until she realises that the superstition is actually false. Later, Kyōko finds herself in the biology prep room with an allegedly sleeping Tetsuo, unaware that he is actually awake.
7	"Succubus-san is Inquisitive"; Transliteration: "Sakyubasu-san wa Ibukashige" (Japanese: サキュバスさんはいぶかしげ)	18 February 2017
Sakie comes across a boy named Kurtz, who is revealed to be a police detective working under Ugaki, an old acquaintance of hers. After Sakie mentions her interest in Tetsuo, Ugaki points out that, contradictory to what she had previously assumed, Tetsuo was actually affected by her aphrodisiac but had acted like he was not affected so as not to hurt Sakie's feelings. Later, Kurtz scolds some male students for taking peeping photos of Sakie while Tetsuo talks with Ugaki about his work in a demi-human division, particularly incidents involving succubi.
8	"Demi-chans Want to Learn"; Transliteration: "Demi-chan wa Manabitai" (Japanese: 亜人ちゃんは学びたい)	25 February 2017
Yuki tries to hide her guilty enjoyment of classic gag manga after Sakie stumbles across one of her dropped books. Surprised to find Kyōko is smarter than she thought she was, Hikari asks her to help her with her studies so she can get praised by Tetsuo. Later, Hikari holds a contest among the others to decide whose arm she would prefer to bite.
9	"Demi-chans Want to Try"; Transliteration: "Demi-chan wa Tameshitai" (Japanese: 亜人ちゃんは試したい)	4 March 2017
Encouraged by Ugaki to make a move, Sakie comes to Tetsuo with the intention of using her aphrodisiac effect on him, but finds herself charmed by his theory on how genuine affection for a succubus can be. Later, Yuki asks Tetsuo to help her learn how to control her snow woman abilities in order to beat the summer heat. Following a particularly hot P.E. lesson, Kyōko tries telling the others a ghost story to cool them down.
10	"The Dullahan Surpasses Space-Time"; Transliteration: "Dyurahan wa Jikū o Koete" (Japanese: デュラハンは時空を超えて)	11 March 2017
After hearing Hikari brag about kissing Tetsuo on the cheek, Kyōko attempts to get a kiss for herself, only to get scolded by Tetsuo when she almost drops her head in the process. Wanting to apologise by providing him with more demi-human research, Kyōko joins Tetsuo at his old university to meet his friend, Souma, who believes that her neck is a wormhole between her head and body that exists in another dimension. Hearing Souma's theories on a dullahan's space-time potential, Kyōko starts to take an interest in researching more about dullahans.
11	"Demi-chans Want to Support"; Transliteration: "Demi-chan wa Sasaetai" (Japanese: 亜人ちゃんは支えたい)	18 March 2017
As Tetsuo looks into a way to help Hikari and Yuki deal with the summer heat, he is warned by the vice-principal not to focus so much on the demis, who currently rely exclusively on him. Having heard about this conflict, some of the regular students, including the girls who used to bully Yuki, discuss among themselves how they should get along with their demi schoolmates. Upon learning of the situation after noticing Tetsuo distance himself from them, the girls send him a video message thanking him for everything he has done for them while Hikari thanks him in person. The next day, the vice-principal reverses his decision, acknowledging how Tetsuo's efforts have inspired both his demi-human and human students.
12	"Demi-chans Want to Swim"; Transliteration: "Demi-chan wa Oyogitai" (Japanese: 亜人ちゃんは泳ぎたい)	25 March 2017
Despite having some concerns over how Hikari will fare in the sunlight, Tetsuo allows her and the others to reserve the outdoor pool, inviting Sakie to join them. As the girls enjoy themselves, Sakie attempts to ask Tetsuo out while Kyōko has a discussion about the legends concerning dullahans, leading to her first experience putting her head underwater. Afterwards, Hikari explains that she wanted to prioritise everyone having fun instead of going out of their way for her.
ONA	"The Demi-chans' Summer Break"; Transliteration: "Demi-chan no Natsuyasumi" (Japanese: 亜人ちゃんの夏休み)	29 June 2017
During summer break, Tetsuo asks Sakie to join him on patrol duty for the local summer festival, which both the demis and Himari and her friends go to. As each group decides to check out a nearby shrine, they get spooked by some strange occurrences, which turn out to be each other. As the next term begins, Tetsuo converses with an invisible woman named Matsuri.

== Reception ==
As of September 2016, the series' three volumes had 550,000 copies in print. As of December 2016, the series had over 1.1 million copies in print.

Volume 2 ranked at number 13 on the Oricon manga charts during its first week, selling 39,876 copies. It dropped to number 14 for its second week, selling another 32,283 copies. Volume 3 ranked 21st, selling 55,907 copies in its first week.

Anime News Network editor Theron Martin published a positive review of the complete anime series in 2018. He gave praise to the loveable main cast (singling out both Tetsuo and Hikari as highlights), the story's attention to detail in its worldbuilding of the demis and adding a bit of philosophy when interacting with them, concluding that "Overall, Interviews with Monster Girls delivers an entertaining and occasionally thoughtful package that avoids the seedier pitfalls common to the monster girl genre."

The Encyclopedia of Science Fiction described the Interviews with Monster Girls anime series as interesting and engaging, highlighting its exploration of the social integration of demi-humans, whose experiences it interpreted as a metaphor for disability. It particularly noted the series' sociological themes, including the history of discrimination against demi-humans and the development of government policies to protect their rights, although it observed that these struggles remained largely confined to the backstory. The encyclopedia also praised the show's scientific speculation, particularly its attempt to explain the biology of mythical creatures through concepts such as wormholes. However, it considered the middle episodes less interesting from a science-fiction perspective, warning that the series risked becoming a conventional slice of life comedy with unusual characters rather than fully exploring its scientific and sociological premises.

=== Accolades ===
Interviews with Monster Girls was nominated for Best Slice of Life in the 2017 Crunchyroll Anime Awards but lost to Girls' Last Tour.
