= Shimeji Simulation =

Japanese manga series

- Cover of the first tankōbon volume, featuring Shijima (left) and Majime (right)

シメジ シミュレーション (Shimeji Shimyurēshon)
- Genre: Surreal comedy
- Manga
- Written by: Tsukumizu
- Published by: Media Factory
- Magazine: Comic Cune
- Original run: January 26, 2019 – November 27, 2023
- Volumes: 5

Shimeji Simulation (シメジ シミュレーション, Shimeji Shimyurēshon) is a Japanese four-panel surreal comedy manga series written and illustrated by Tsukumizu. It was serialized in Media Factory's Comic Cune magazine from January 2019 to November 2023 and compiled into five tankōbon volumes.

== Plot ==
Shimeji Simulation follows Shijima Tsukishima, a former hikikomori who decides to attend high school after spending two years in her closet. As she gets ready for school, she finds shimeji mushrooms have sprouted from her head. Later, at school, Shijima is approached by Majime Yamashita, a girl with a fried egg on her own head, which she says she was born with. The two bond while more strange events happen in their town.

== Characters ==
Shijima Tsukishima (月島 しじま, Tsukishima Shijima)
Voiced by: Naomi Ōzora (voice comic)
A former hikikomori with shimeji mushrooms growing from her head, who decides to go to school after two years of living in a closet.
Majime Yamashita (山下 まじめ, Yamashita Majime)
Voiced by: Yumiri Hanamori (voice comic)
A girl born with a fried egg on her head, who becomes Shijima's first real friend after a prolonged period of self-isolation.
Shijima's older sister (しじまの姉, Shijima no ane)
Voiced by: Mai Fuchigami (voice comic)
Shijima's unnamed sister who dropped out of university and is currently conducting mysterious research. She is Shijima's sole caretaker and helps her study for her high school entrance exams.
Ms. Mogawa (もがわ先生, Mogawa-sensei)
One of the teachers in Shijima's school. Her subject is art, and she serves as the curator of the Hole-Digging Club. She is a known alcoholic.
Sumida (すみだ, Sumida)
A second-year student and member of the Hole-Digging Club. Due to her lack of social skills, Sumida communicates by writing in a sketchbook that she always carries with her.
Yomikawa (よみかわ, Yomikawa)
A third-year student and member of the Hole-Digging Club. She has a book on her head, which represents her hobby as an avid reader.
Shijima's neighbors
Two unnamed characters that live in the same apartment complex as Shijima. They are cameos of Chito and Yuuri, the main characters of Tsukumizu's previous work Girls' Last Tour. Yuuri's counterpart is a convenience store worker.
The Gardener
A girl in a dress and a hat that resembles cat ears. She uses a baton-like stick to fix anomalies in the city.

== Publication ==
Shimeji Simulation is written and illustrated by Tsukumizu. The series ran in Media Factory's Comic Cune magazine from January 26, 2019, to November 26, 2023. The first volume was released on February 28, 2020, and the last on January 26, 2024.

=== Volumes ===
No.	Release date	ISBN
1	February 28, 2020	978-4-04-064291-8
2	January 27, 2021	978-4-04-064967-2
3	January 27, 2022	978-4-04-681080-9
4	January 27, 2023	978-4-04-682066-2
5	January 26, 2024	978-4-04-683209-2

== Reception ==
Jacob Parker-Dalton of Otaquest calls Shimeji Simulation a continuation of the imaginativeness of Girls' Last Tour, and compares the dour/dashing dynamic between Shijima and Majime to Chito and Yuuri in a May 2020 review. Matthew England of CBR, meanwhile, ranks it as number eight on their list of 5 Manga That Need An Anime Adaptation (& 5 That You Didn't Know Already Have One).
