= Flying Witch =

Japanese manga series

- First tankōbon volume cover, featuring Chito (left) and Makoto Kowata (right)

ふらいんぐうぃっち (Furaingu Witchi)
- Genre: Comedy; Iyashikei; Supernatural
- Manga
- Written by: Chihiro Ishizuka
- Published by: Kodansha
- English publisher: NA: Vertical
- Magazine: Bessatsu Shōnen Magazine
- Original run: August 9, 2012 – present
- Volumes: 15
- Anime television series
- Directed by: Katsushi Sakurabi
- Produced by: Atsushi Kirimoto; Hiroyuki Inage; Kazunari Sengoku; Shunsuke Nara; Yohei Ito
- Written by: Deko Akao
- Music by: Yoshiaki Dewa
- Studio: J.C.Staff
- Licensed by: NA: Sentai Filmworks; UK: Animatsu Entertainment (cancelled); MVM Films
- Original network: Nippon TV, Sun TV, RAB, BS NTV, MMT
- Original run: April 10, 2016 – June 26, 2016
- Episodes: 12
- icon

Flying Witch (Japanese: ふらいんぐうぃっち, Hepburn: Furaingu Witchi) is a Japanese manga series written and illustrated by Chihiro Ishizuka. It has been serialized in Kodansha's Bessatsu Shōnen Magazine since August 2012, with its chapters collected in 15 tankōbon volumes as of June 2026. An anime television series adaptation produced by J.C.Staff aired between April and June 2016.

== Plot ==
The story is about Makoto, a young witch from Yokohama, who moves to Hirosaki, Aomori to live with relatives as part of her training. What follows is Makoto's daily life as she gets used to her new environment. Her relatives and the new friends she makes there are introduced to the customs and peculiarities of witchcraft.

== Characters ==
Makoto Kowata (木幡 真琴, Kowata Makoto)
Voiced by: Minami Shinoda (Japanese); Stephanie Wittels (English)
A witch in training who moves to live with her relatives in Aomori. She is a polite and kind girl who gets lost easily, and is more focused on preparing potions than casting spells. She has a black cat familiar named Chito.
Chito (チト)
Voiced by: Ai Kayano (Japanese); Tiffany Grant (English)
A 17-year-old black cat who is Makoto's familiar.
Chinatsu Kuramoto (倉本 千夏, Kuramoto Chinatsu)
Voiced by: Eri Suzuki (Japanese); Juliet Simmons (English)
Kei's little sister and Makoto's cousin. Initially wary of Makoto, whom she found strange when they first met, she quickly comes to like her after Makoto takes her flying on a broom. She is fascinated with magic and eagerly watches Makoto when she does something that involves witchcraft or something supernatural. She also enjoys sweets. She becomes Akane's apprentice to learn more about magic and to later become a witch herself. After wishing to be able to use magic, Makoto and Inukai manage to inadvertently create a ring filled with mana from a tooth from Hamabe (a sea spirit who befriended Chinatsu). The ring then bonded with Chinatsu and enabled her to use water magic.
Kei Kuramoto (倉本 圭, Kuramoto Kei)
Voiced by: Shinsuke Sugawara (Japanese); Adam Gibbs (English)
Chinatsu's older brother and Makoto's cousin.
Keiji Kuramoto (倉本啓二, Kuramoto Keiji)
Voiced by: Mitsuru Ogata (Japanese); John Swasey (English)
Kei and Chinatsu's father and Nana's husband. He speaks in a Tsugaru dialect. In the English dub, Keiji speaks with a country accent.
Nana Kuramoto (倉本 奈々, Kuramoto Nana)
Voiced by: Kikuko Inoue (Japanese); Joanne Bonasso (English)
Kei and Chinatsu's mother. She is familiar with the world of witchcraft and does not find some of the odd things that happen because of Makoto strange at all. She illustrates and writes children books professionally as her job.
Akane Kowata (木幡茜, Kowata Akane)
Voiced by: Kana Aoi (Japanese); Christina Kelly (English)
Makoto's older sister and a full-fledged witch. She contrasts with Makoto in both personality and appearance. While Makoto is polite and softly spoken, Akane is more brash and loud-mouthed, though still just as kind. She also has brown skin and white hair, which contrasts with Makoto's pale skin and black hair. Makoto mentions that many people say that they do not have much in common. Akane cares deeply for Makoto and takes time off from her travels all around the world to visit and check on her sister regularly. She also has a Siamese cat familiar named Kenny.
Kenny (ケニー, Kenī)
Voiced by: Ayane Sakura (Japanese); Kyle Colby Jones (English)
A Siamese cat who is Akane's familiar.
Nao Ishiwatari (石渡なお, Ishiwatari Nao)
Voiced by: Shiori Mikami (Japanese); Chaney Moore (English)
Kei's friend, whose family runs a liquor store.
Inukai (犬養)
Voiced by: Mari Hino (Japanese); Chelsea McCurdy (English)
A witch from Akita who specializes in fortune-telling, and is also Akane's friend. After a night of heavy drinking, she ate some chocolates which turn people into animals, made by Akane, and became an anthropomorphic dog. As the chocolates did not work correctly she simply has the face, ears, and tail of a dog, as well as furry skin, and returns to her human form at night. She has been looking for a way to contact Akane for a year to find a cure which will return her to human form permanently. Due to her half-animal appearance, she wears a cloak that covers her face and body so that she does not draw attention. Kei admits that she is his type of girl after seeing her as a human. She has a hamster familiar named Al.
Al (アル, Aru)
Voiced by: Ari Ozawa (Japanese); Alexandra Bedford (English)
A white hamster who is Inukai's familiar. It wears a small bow tie.
Anzu Shiina (椎名あんず, Shiina Anzu)
Voiced by: Yuka Iguchi (Japanese); Kira Vincent-Davis (English)
A witch who lives nearby Kei and Chinatsu's house. While soft-spoken and somewhat reserved, she's an amateur archaeologist and has a love for history. She has a brown owl familiar named Aurore.
Aurore (オロル, Ororu)
A brown owl who is Anzu Shiina's familiar.
Anzu's Mother (杏子の母)
Voiced by: Risa Hayamizu (Japanese); Courtney Lomelo (English)
Anzu's mother and the owner of Café Concrucio, She is also a witch.
Hina (ひな)
Voiced by: Hisako Kanemoto (Japanese); Melissa Molano (English)
A female ghost who was born in 1906 Japan (Meiji Era) and now works at the Café run by Anzu's mother. She is very shy towards others as shown when Makoto, Kei and Chinatsu visit the café.

== Media ==
=== Manga ===
Written and illustrated by Chihiro Ishizuka, Flying Witch began in Kodansha's shōnen manga magazine Bessatsu Shōnen Magazine on August 9, 2012. Kodansha has collected its chapters into individual tankōbon volumes. The first volume was released on December 9, 2013. In 2019, Partial sales from the eighth volume were donated to Kyoto Animation after the Kyoto Animation arson attack. As of June 9, 2026, 15 volumes have been released.

North American publisher Vertical announced their license to the series during their panel at Anime Central on May 22, 2016. The first volume was released in March 2017.

==== Volumes ====
No.	Original release date	Original ISBN	English release date	English ISBN
1	December 9, 2013	978-4-06-394992-6	March 28, 2017	978-1-94-505409-9
2	June 9, 2014	978-4-06-395095-3	June 27, 2017	978-1-94-505410-5
3	April 9, 2015	978-4-06-395363-3	September 26, 2017	978-1-94-505411-2
4	March 9, 2016	978-4-06-395635-1	December 19, 2017	978-1-94-505412-9
5	November 9, 2016	978-4-06-395790-7	March 20, 2018	978-1-94-505467-9
6	September 8, 2017	978-4-06-510183-4	June 5, 2018	978-1-94-719404-5
7	September 7, 2018	978-4-06-512323-2	June 11, 2019	978-1-94-719461-8
8	August 9, 2019	978-4-06-516285-9; 978-4-06-517032-8 (SE)	April 21, 2020	978-1-94-998015-8
9	June 9, 2020	978-4-06-519382-2	March 9, 2021	978-1-94-998097-4
10	June 9, 2021	978-4-06-523415-0	February 22, 2022	978-1-64-729048-1
11	June 9, 2022	978-4-06-528167-3	February 21, 2023	978-1-64-729063-4
12	June 8, 2023	978-4-06-531871-3	March 26, 2024	978-1-64-729230-0
13	June 7, 2024	978-4-06-535786-6	July 29, 2025	978-1-64-729455-7
14	June 9, 2025	978-4-06-539743-5	July 7, 2026	978-1-64-729588-2
15	June 9, 2026	978-4-06-544109-1	—	—

=== Anime ===
An anime television series adaptation aired from April 10 to June 26, 2016. (Note: NTV listed the air dates for the series on Saturday at 26:25, which is effectively Sunday at 2:25 a.m. JST.) The opening theme of the anime is Shanranran (シャンランラン) by miwa featuring 96 Neko (96猫), while the ending theme is Everyday Magic (日常の魔法, Nichijō no mahō) by Minami Shinoda and Eri Suzuki. Sentai Filmworks has licensed the series in North America and produced an English dub. Animatsu Entertainment initially licensed the series in the United Kingdom. However, the release was cancelled after the company was dissolved at the end of 2019. Eventually, MVM Films acquired the series in the United Kingdom and Ireland and released it with a collector's edition on October 9, 2023.

==== Episodes ====
No.	Title	Original release date
1	"It's Been Six Years"; Transliteration: "6-Nen buri no fushigi" (Japanese: 6年振りの不思議)	April 10, 2016
Makoto Kowata is a young witch who moves from Yokohama to Aomori in northern Honshu to complete her training and become a full-fledged witch. She has arranged to stay with her cousins, the Kuramotos, on their farm. Her younger cousin Chinatsu thinks Makoto is odd for talking to her cat, Chito-san, but is quickly won over by a trip to the shopping mall in the town of Hirasaki. Among other things, Makoto buys a broomstick for flying. She lets Chinatsu fly back to the farm on her new broomstick. Chinatsu is ecstatic. She becomes more friendly to Makoto and less fearful of magic. The next day, Makoto attends a normal high school with her older cousin Kei and his friend Nao. After school, Nao guides Makoto home, so she will not get lost. While they are getting to know each other, Makoto finds a wild mandrake root and pulls it up. She offers it to Nao as a gift of their new friendship. Nao is terrified by the squirming, screaming root, so she declines the gift. Makoto takes the root home with her, because mandrake is a rare and precious resource.
2	"A Visitor for the Witch"; Transliteration: "Majo e no hōmon-sha" (Japanese: 魔女への訪問者)	April 17, 2016
Chinatsu is scared by the appearance of a strange, tall man at their front door. Makoto recognizes him as the Harbinger of Spring. The Harbinger indicates this is a courtesy call to welcome her to this area. Makoto greets him respectfully and thanks him for creating the beautiful Spring foliage and flowers. She offers him two pieces of the mandrake root she recently collected. The Harbinger thanks her for the rare gift. He gives her a pot of petunias as a peace offering for scaring Chinatsu. Later, on the way home from school, Makoto tells Nao that she had a dream that indicated good luck in her future. Nao is delighted and heads home. Makoto and Kei pick some wild fuki shoots, locally called bakke, along the side of the road. At home, they soak the bitterness from the buds and fry them in tempura batter for a snack. Chinatsu refuses to have any because no amount of soaking will change the bitter taste. Elsewhere, Nao sits and wonders what form her predicted good luck might take.
3	"Lessons in Farming and Magic"; Transliteration: "Hata kōza to majutsu kōza" (Japanese: 畑講座と魔術講座)	April 24, 2016
Makoto wants to start a garden to increase her knowledge and connection with Nature. Uncle Keiji says she can use the plot behind the house, which has not been used since his mother passed away. It is full of weeds, so Kei and Chinatsu offer to help pull them up. After a while, Makoto spots a pheasant and chases it around the garden. She references "The Tale of Momotarō," who is accompanied by his faithful monkey, dog, and pheasant. Across the world in Africa, Makoto's sister Akane decides to take a break from her world travels to visit Makoto and her Aomori cousins. Akane teleports to the Kuramoto farm and greets everyone. She hands out very odd gifts from Africa. Akane criticizes Makoto's laziness in spellcasting. Akane teaches Makoto a spell to summon a wild crow, using a black hair from Chinatsu. Makoto practices the spell, but accidentally makes it too powerful by using her own black hair. The hair of a witch is very potent, so it summons a whole flock—a murder of crows. Akane says the birds will disperse, eventually. Akane teleports away, leaving them to deal with the birds.
4	"A Fortune Teller Veiled in Cherry Blossoms"; Transliteration: "Sakura no naka no uranaishi" (Japanese: 桜の中の占い師)	May 1, 2016
Makoto and her cousins visit the Hanami, the local cherry blossom festival. Makoto and her cousins explore the park and have their picture taken in front of Hirasaki Castle. On the way back home, the trio encounters a roadside fortune teller. When the fortune teller hears Makoto's surname, Kowata, she reveals herself to be a fellow witch named Inukai. She claims that after a drunken night of revelry, Akane Kowata tricked her into being turned into a dog-person. It happened last year, so Inukai has been in the park waiting for Akane to return. Makoto invites Inukai to the Kuramoto household and attempts to reverse Akane's spell with magical konpeito candy. However, the candy temporarily makes Inukai more dog-like. Later, Akane arrives and explains that Inukai caused the transformation herself. Akane had warned Inukai not to eat the magic chocolate, but she was hungry, so she ate it. The spell will fade, eventually.
5	"How to Use Your Familiar"; Transliteration: "Tsukaima no katsuyō-hō" (Japanese: 使い魔の活用法)	May 8, 2016
Chito explores the town. By familiarizing herself with the town, Chito can prevent Makoto from becoming lost. A curious Chinatsu follows Chito as she visits different places. After returning home, Chinatsu is tired and takes a nap. Chito takes Makoto for a walk and shows her interesting things: a mark on a door which looks like a face, a tied-up dog which Chito taunts, a cherry tree which rains blossoms, and a treasure box which some boys hid. Makoto examines the box and discovers it's a time capsule.
6	"Trick and Treat"; Transliteration: "Okashina okashi" (Japanese: おかしなおかし)	May 15, 2016
Akane starts teaching Makoto witchcraft. Chinatsu asks Akane to take her as an apprentice and make her a witch as well. Chinatsu asks her parents for permission, which they give easily. Akane is still reluctant, because people who are not naturally born a witch have to work very hard. Akane proposes to show Chinatsu what it's like to be a witch, so she can make an informed decision. Akane shows Chinatsu and Makoto a "Trick or Treat" magic spell, using some snacks, one makes the eater cry, and the other laugh. Makoto ends up crying, Chinatsu laughing, while Uncle Keiji—who eats both—simultaneously laughs and cries.
7	"Café Conclusio"; Transliteration: "Kissa Konkurushio" (Japanese: 喫茶コンクルシオ)	May 22, 2016
Makoto, Chinatsu, Nao, and Kei go picking herbs in the mountains. The children and Nao take the bus to the forest at the foot of the mountains. Akane is jet-lagged, so she stays home to sleep. Kei selects a good spot to pick ostrich fern fiddle-heads for snacks. This is Nao's first time picking greens in the woods. She is afraid there may be bears. When a frog hops on Nao, she screams so loud that the hidden forest bear runs away. When they get home, Kei cooks up the fern snacks. Later, Akane sends Chinatsu, Makoto, and Kei to a nearby café owned by a local witch and her daughter, thinking Chinatsu should experience the local witch community and Makoto should meet a local senior practitioner. They follow the map Akane drew for them, but the address is a deserted ruin. On the back of the map, there are instructions for a short ritual. When they perform the rite, they see a lovely café in place of the ruined building. They enter and seat themselves. A ghostly paper appears on the table, indicating they should make their order. The waitress is revealed to be a timid ghost named Hina. They order tea and a variety of desserts.
8	"The Regular Customers"; Transliteration: "Jōren no nakigoe" (Japanese: 常連の鳴き声)	May 29, 2016
While the group enjoys their tea and cake, the owner, Mrs. Shiina, and her daughter, Anzu, arrive, and later, some regular customers, a ladybug couple, share some snacks. Chinatsu provides a commentary for the couple as they dine. The Veil of Night, who brings the night every day, has a quiet table to herself. And a fox comes by to enjoy a plate of winter cherries. The children are in awe of the clientele and enjoy themselves. Post-credits, Akane travels to Vietnam and tries a new spell.
9	"The Day After Tomorrow is Today"; Transliteration: "Ashita no ashita wa ima ni aru" (Japanese: 明日の明日は今にある)	June 5, 2016
Aunt Nana is an author and illustrator of children's books. The children read and enjoy her latest book. Just then, Inukai arrives with her familiar, Al the hamster. Inukai feels guilty that she never told Makoto's fortune at the Hanami festival. To make up for it, she casts pebbles to read a fortune for each child. Later, Nao drops by for a visit. Makoto shows her around the farm. When they get near the mandrake root, Makoto offers it to her as a gift. Still terrified, Nao declines again. Akane flies in and gives everyone a gift from Africa. Each gift matches that person's fortune.
10	"Bad With Cooking and Bad With Bees"; Transliteration: "Ryōri awazu to hachi awazu" (Japanese: 料理合わずと蜂合わず)	June 12, 2016
Nao is bad at cooking and is nervous in home-ec class. With support from Makoto and Kei, Nao attempts to make hamburger steaks. Kei makes a curry. Makoto makes a salad and some cookies that look like witch pinkie fingers. All the food looks delicious. When they are ready to eat, they realize no one made the rice! Later, Makoto and Akane accompany their cousins to their apple orchard to thin the apple blossoms. Thinning the blossoms ensures that each apple will get a greater share of the nutrients and grow to be a perfect fruit. Makoto goes near the beehives. She lets one of the hornface bees land on her finger. These bees do not sting, but this one bites her and flies off to pollinate a flower.
11	"A Whale in the Sky"; Transliteration: "Kujira, sora o tobu" (Japanese: くじら、空をとぶ)	June 26, 2016
The Newspaper Carrier arrives in the fog and brings Akane a paper with magical community news. Makoto sees the magical newspaper, and Akane remarks that Makoto should get one too. It's been a long time since she had news "from the other side." While reading the magical newspaper, Akane sees an article that a flying whale will be nearby. She takes Makoto and Chinatsu to see it. They fly up onto the whale for a ride and find Anzu Shiina already there. She is studying the ancient ruins built on the whale's back. They invite Anzu to their place for breakfast. Kei makes hotcakes, and they all enjoy breakfast with some congenial conversation.
12	"A Witch's Robe and Different Ways to Spend the Day (Series Finale)"; Transliteration: "Majo no rōbu to hibi wa jūnintoiro" (Japanese: 魔女のローブと日々は十人十色)	June 26, 2016
Makoto finds her old witch's robes. They are very small, worn thin, and shredded by Chito. She decides to make some new robes. After getting directions to a fabric store from Aunt Nana, Makoto ventures out with Chito. They buy some cloth and return without getting lost. Makoto also makes a set of witch's robes with some red cloth for Chinatsu. Makoto will not let Chinatsu watch her sew, referencing "The Tale of the Grateful Crane." Chinatsu is extremely happy with the finished robe and shows it to her family. Later, a drunken Akane returns from the Hirasaki Neputa Festival. While Makoto and Akane are trying to locate a lost mandrake root, they find ground fish. They are like normal fish, except they live in the ground. The fish are gathering because they love festivals. Akane gives them some of her sake. The fish drink greedily, change color, and float into the air. They begin to glow like festival lanterns. Makoto looks upon them in wonder and delight.
