= Rinkai! =

Japanese media franchise

- Anime key visual

リンカイ！
- Genre: Sports (Keirin)
- Created by: Mixi
- Manga

Rinkai! Azalea
- Written by: Kiyoshi Yamane
- Published by: Amazia
- Magazine: Manga Bang!
- Original run: April 9, 2024 – present
- Anime television series
- Directed by: Takaaki Ishiyama
- Written by: Hideki Shirane
- Music by: Shuichiro Fukuhiro; Yoshihei Ueda; Mana Hirano
- Studio: TMS Entertainment (Note: Animation production assistance (アニメーション制作協力) for all episodes provided by Maruga Factory.)
- Licensed by: SA/SEA: Medialink
- Original network: Tokyo MX, BS Fuji
- Original run: April 9, 2024 – June 25, 2024
- Episodes: 12
- icon

Rinkai! (リンカイ！) is a Japanese mixed-media project about women's keirin cycling created by Mixi. A manga series by Kiyoshi Yamane titled Rinkai! Azalea began serialization in Amazia's Manga Bang! service in April 2024. An anime television series adaptation produced by TMS Entertainment aired from April to June 2024.

== Characters ==
As per their official profiles, every character is a cyclist each representative from a different Japanese prefecture, associated with a specific velodrome situated there. Each character's surname shares in turn the name of the city which is home to such velodrome.

=== Main characters (Protagonists) ===
Izumi Itō (伊藤 泉, Itō Izumi)
Voiced by: Umino Kawamura
The daughter of the owner of an onsen inn establishment, together with her older sister Atsumi they are known as the "On-Sen Sisters". A cycling enthusiast, she became an athlete without having any previous experience in the sport.
Nana Hiratsuka (平塚 ナナ, Hiratsuka Nana)
Voiced by: Azusa Aoi
Born to a Japanese mother and a French father, himself also a cyclist, she achieved entrance to a cycling training institute in the first ever special selection for female athletes, all the while completing school education ahead of schedule.
Miko Yahiko (弥彦 巫子, Yahiko Miko)
Voiced by: Rena Hasegawa
Previously the center of a former local idol group which ended up disbanding due to certain internal issues, she set out to become a cyclist who would be able to earn a living with her own strength alone.
Sachi Nagoya (那古屋 紗智, Nagoya Sachi)
Voiced by: Saika Kitamori
The only daughter of a renowned zaibatsu family of the Tōkai region, after being raised in a sheltered and overly affective way by her parents, she decided to become a cyclist in order to become independent from her family.
Kinusa Takamatsu (高松 絹早, Takamatsu Kinusa)
Voiced by: Riho Sugiyama
Capable both in sports and in the academic field, after graduating from school she found a job at a major firm. Not feeling fulfilled with it, however, she switched through different occupations, from office worker to yoga instructor, until finally becoming a cyclist.
Ai Kumamoto (熊本 愛, Kumamoto Ai)
Voiced by: Minami Hinata
A sports multi-talent with an innate leader character, she began cycling competitions since the second year of high school, dominating the whole national scene with her prowess.

=== Minor characters ===
Tsutsuji Kurume (久留米 美虹, Kurume Tsutsuji)
Voiced by: Rico Sasaki
A gold medalist at worldwide competitions and current title holder. Despite not starting as an elite athlete, she changed radically after going through a certain moment of her life, rising all at once to the top position.
Chigiri Toyohashi (豊橋 契, Toyohashi Chigiri)
Voiced by: Yukari Anzai
Suzu Matsusaka (松阪 鈴, Matsusaka Suzu)
Voiced by: Miho Morisaki
Sora Iwakitaira (磐城平 颯来, Iwakitaira Sora)
Voiced by: Yuka Ozaki
Remi Hiroshima (広島 恋未, Hiroshima Remi)
Voiced by: Hinako Takahashi
Midori Maebashi (前橋 緑, Maebashi Midori)
Voiced by: Misato Murai
Rika Matsudo (松戸 梨花, Matsudo Rika)
Voiced by: Minami Shinoda
Rio Kishiwada (岸和田 リオ, Kishiwada Rio)
Voiced by: Rena Maeda
Yakuko Toyama (富山 薬子, Toyama Yakuko)
Voiced by: Hiromi Kawakami
Momoka Tamano (玉野 桃花, Tamano Momoka)
Voiced by: Hikaru Tono
Kōme Hōfu (防府 幸梅, Hōfu Kōme)
Voiced by: Makoto Koichi
Remu Tachikawa (立川 麗夢, Tachikawa Remu)
Voiced by: Yū Wakui
Miyako Mukomachi (向日町 京子, Mukomachi Miyako)
Voiced by: Mariko Higashiuchi
Sawamitsu (澤光)
Voiced by: Kazuya Ichijō
Yamada (山田)
Voiced by: Yasushi Iwaki

== Media ==
=== Manga ===
A manga series by Kiyoshi Yamane titled Rinkai! Azalea (リンカイ！アザレア, Rinkai! Azarea) began serialization in Amazia's Manga Bang! service April 9, 2024.

=== Anime ===
An anime television series was announced alongside the manga series at the AnimeJapan 2023 event. The series is produced by TMS Entertainment and directed by Takaaki Ishiyama, with Hideki Shirane handling series composition, Hiromi Ono designing the characters, and Shuichiro Fukuhiro, Yoshihei Ueda and Mana Hirano composing the music. It aired from April 9 to June 25, 2024, on Tokyo MX and BS Fuji. The opening theme song is "Windshifter", performed by Rico Sasaki, while the ending theme song is "Override!", performed by the main cast.

Medialink licensed the series in South and Southeast Asia for streaming on Ani-One Asia's YouTube channel, while Jonu Media licensed the series in Spain.

==== Episodes ====
No.	Title (Note: All English titles are taken from Ani-One Asia.)	Original release date
1	"Hot Springs and Vows"; Transliteration: "Onsen to Chikai" (Japanese: 温泉と誓い)	April 9, 2024
2	"The Courage to Take The Step"; Transliteration: "Fumidasu Yūki" (Japanese: 踏み出す勇気)	April 16, 2024
3	"L14 Term"; Transliteration: "L14 Ki" (Japanese: L14期)	April 23, 2024
4	"Let's Fight It Out"; Transliteration: "Shinken Shōbu" (Japanese: 真剣勝負)	April 30, 2024
5	"Competitor"; Transliteration: "Raibaru" (Japanese: ライバル)	May 7, 2024
6	"The Morning Sun of Tomorrow"; Transliteration: "Ashita no Asa" (Japanese: あしたの朝)	May 14, 2024
7	"Graduation Commemorative Game"; Transliteration: "Sotsuki Rēsu" (Japanese: 卒記レース)	May 21, 2024
8	"The Way of Survival in Bicycle Race"; Transliteration: "Keirin to Iu Ikikata" (Japanese: 競輪という生き方)	May 28, 2024
9	"I Don't Know"; Transliteration: "Wakarimasen!" (Japanese: わかりません！)	June 4, 2024
10	"Thanks"; Transliteration: "Taisha" (Japanese: 代謝)	June 11, 2024
11	"Bicycle Race Arena"; Transliteration: "Keirinjō" (Japanese: 競輪場)	June 18, 2024
12	"To the Future"; Transliteration: "Mogake, Mirai e!" (Japanese: もがけ、未来へ！)	June 25, 2024
