= Minami Shinoda =

Japanese voice actress and singer (born 1994)

- 篠田 みなみ
- Born: 3 June 1994 (age 32)
- Occupation: Voice actress
- Years active: 2014–present
- Notable work: Tokyo 7th Sisters as Haru Kasukabe; Flying Witch as Makoto Kobata; Interviews with Monster Girls as Kyōko Machi; Umamusume: Pretty Derby as Tap Dance City

Minami Shinoda (Japanese: 篠田 みなみ, Hepburn: Shinoda Minami; born 3 June 1994) is a Japanese voice actress from Chiba Prefecture. She is known for voicing Haru Kasukabe in Tokyo 7th Sisters, Makoto Kobata in Flying Witch, Kyōko Machi in Interviews with Monster Girls, Rika Matsudo in Rinkai!, and Tap Dance City in Umamusume: Pretty Derby.

== Biography ==
Minami Shinoda, a native of Chiba Prefecture, was born on 3 June 1994. During her youth, she spent some time living in Singapore and started learning Sōran Bushi and jazz dance. She joined the Japan Narration Actor Institute during her first year of high school to study acting and later knew that she wanted to pursue voice acting as a career.

In 2014, she starred as Haru Kasukabe in Tokyo 7th Sisters, her first role she won by passuing a voice acting audition. In April 2014, she started working as the Tuesday host of Maji! Anirabu team. In April 2016, she was cast in her first anime starring role as Makoto Kobata in Flying Witch; she and her-co-star Eri Suzuki also sang the anime's ending song "Nichijō no Mahō". She later starred as Kyōko Machi in Interviews with Monster Girls (2017). In September 2018, she was appointed as a Dōgo Onsen Tourism Goodwill Ambassador along her Onsen Musume character Izumi Dōgo. In 2020, she stepped down from Gekidan Tokyo Suzuki-ku's production of Heroine A Go Go! Ano Hi no Mahō Shōjo due to complications from nasopharyngitis. She left VIMS and become a freelancer on 31 August 2021. In 2024, she was cast as Rika Matsudo in Rinkai!.

She is a certified Korean Language Proficiency Test Beginner Level.

== Filmography ==
=== Animated television ===
Year	Title	Role(s)	Ref
2014	One Week Friends		
2015	Aikatsu!		
2015	God Eater	Refugee	
2015	Uta no Prince-sama: Maji Love Revolutions		
2016	Beyblade Burst	Akio	
2016	ClassicaLoid	Friend A	
2016	Flying Witch	Makoto Kowata	
2016	Haven't You Heard? I'm Sakamoto	Female student	
2016	JoJo's Bizarre Adventure: Diamond Is Unbreakable	Female student B, Reiko	
2016	Lostorage incited WIXOSS	Piruluk	
2016	Magical Girl Raising Project	Boy B	
2016	Re:Zero	Cain	
2017	Fuuka	Female customer	
2017	Interviews with Monster Girls	Kyōko Machi	
2018	Chio's School Road	Takkun	
2018	High School DxD Hero	Le Fay Pendragon	
2018	Layton Mystery Tanteisha: Katori no Nazotoki File	Bengali	
2018	Slow Start	Momoka Sekine	
2018	The Ryuo's Work Is Never Done!	Asuka Iwaishi	
2019	Fruits Basket	Senior, boy	
2024	Rinkai!	Rika Matsudo	

=== Original video animation ===
Year	Title	Role(s)	Ref
2014	Miss Monochrome		

=== Original net animation ===
Year	Title	Role(s)	Ref
2016	Momokuri		
2016	Tawawa on Monday	Dental assistant	
2018	Monster Strike	Eriya	

=== Video games ===
Year	Title	Role(s)	Ref
2017	Azur Lane Crosswave	Lexington	
2017	Hiragana Danshi	I	
2017	Tenka Hyakken: Zan	Sōza Samonji	
2018	Kirara Fantasia	Agiri Goshiki	
2019	Kemono Friends 3	Kujaku	
2020	Last Period	Aruru	
2023	Umamusume: Pretty Derby	Tap Dance City	

=== Dubbing ===
==== Animation ====
Year	Title	Role(s)	Ref
2016	Lego Nexo Knights	Robin Underwood	
2023	Firebuds	Bo Bayani	
