= Iyashikei =

Genre of Japanese works

Iyashikei (Japanese: 癒し系; lit. 'healing' or 'healing-type') is a genre specific to Japanese works, primarily manga and anime. It is a sub-genre of slice of life, portraying characters living out peaceful lives in calming environments, and is intended to have a healing effect on the audience. Shaenon K. Garrity of Otaku USA wrote that in iyashikei works, "the focus is less on character and plot, more on worldbuilding and creating an immersive visual setting".

== Origins ==
Iyashikei originated in the late 1970s, but it emerged as a distinct subgenre in 1995, in the wake of the Great Hanshin earthquake and the Tokyo subway sarin attack. These traumatic events, combined with the economic recession, would lead to what scholar Paul Roquet calls the iyashi trend, or healing boom. The trauma suffered by the Japanese public provided "the emotional context for the emergence of calm as a lucrative and marketable feeling."

== Examples ==
- Adachi and Shimamura
- Animal Crossing series
- Aria
- Azumanga Daioh
- Bartender
- Boku no Natsuyasumi series
- Flying Witch
- Girls' Last Tour
- Hakumei and Mikochi
- The Helpful Fox Senko-san
- K-On!
- Kiyo in Kyoto
- Kuma Kuma Kuma Bear
- Laid-Back Camp
- Magical Emi, the Magic Star
- Mushishi
- My Neighbor Totoro
- My Roommate Is a Cat
- Natsume's Book of Friends
- Non Non Biyori
- Super Cub
- Tamayura
- Wakakozake
- Yokohama Kaidashi Kikou

== Reception ==
Journalist Patrick Lum of The Guardian wrote an article on the genre titled "In Praise of Iyashikei: why we love soothing anime where nothing happens" commending the genre. In it, he explained that even if works in this genre can be considered "boring" where not much happens in them in regards to plot, they have an appeal where it's simply cozy. The fact that nothing much in them other than wholesome activity could make a rather comforting watch from their point of view. Lum recommended My Neighbor Totoro as an example of the genre.
