= Girls' Last Tour =

Japanese manga and anime series

- Cover of the first tankōbon volume, featuring Chito (left) and Yuuri (right)

少女終末旅行 (Shōjo Shūmatsu Ryokō)
- Genre: Iyashikei; Post-apocalyptic; Science fiction
- Manga
- Written by: Tsukumizu
- Published by: Shinchosha
- English publisher: NA: Yen Press
- Imprint: Bunch Comics
- Magazine: Kurage Bunch
- Original run: February 21, 2014 – January 12, 2018
- Volumes: 6
- Anime television series
- Directed by: Takaharu Ozaki
- Produced by: Mitsuhiro Ogata; Shō Tanaka; Noritomo Isogai; Tomoaki Iwasaka
- Written by: Kazuyuki Fudeyasu
- Music by: Kenichiro Suehiro
- Studio: White Fox
- Licensed by: NA: Sentai Filmworks; UK: MVM Films; SA/SEA: Muse Communication
- Original network: AT-X, Tokyo MX, BS11, Sun TV, KBS, TV Aichi, TVQ
- English network: SEA: Animax Asia
- Original run: October 6, 2017 – December 22, 2017
- Episodes: 12
- Original video animation

少女週末授業 Girls' Last Class
- Studio: Kadokawa
- Released: October 6, 2017 – December 22, 2017
- Runtime: 1 minute, 30 seconds (each episode)
- Episodes: 12
- Manga

Kaisō Toshi Danpen-Shū
- Written by: Tsukumizu
- Published by: Shinchosha
- Magazine: Kurage Bunch
- Original run: June 26, 2026 – present
- Volumes: 1
- icon

Girls' Last Tour (Japanese: 少女終末旅行, Hepburn: Shōjo Shūmatsu Ryokō) is a Japanese manga series written and illustrated by Tsukumizu. It follows the adventures of two girls, Chito and Yuuri, traveling through a world that has fallen into a post-apocalyptic winter.

The manga was serialized monthly on Shinchosha's Kurage Bunch manga website from February 2014 to January 2018, with its chapters collected in six tankōbon volumes. An English release of the manga is licensed in North America by Yen Press. A 12-episode anime television adaptation, produced by White Fox, aired in Japan from October to December 2017. It covered the manga's first four volumes.

The manga series began as a short story that would later become a chapter of its first volume, with Tsukumizu creating Chito and Yuuri's characters from the idea of expressing personal questions. The anime adaptation involved Takaharu Ozaki, its director, focusing on the story's narrative structure as well as Chito and Yuuri's emotional portrayals.

The anime won the "Best Slice of Life" category at the 2nd Crunchyroll Anime Awards in 2018, and the manga won the 50th Seiun Award in the Best Comic category in 2019. Both the manga and anime series have been well received for their premise, visual elements, and themes, with the plot garnering more balanced reactions.

== Plot ==
The series follows two girls, Chito and Yuuri, as they navigate the ruins of civilization after a major conflict leaves the world in a desolate post-apocalyptic winter. They travel in their Kettenkrad halftrack motorcycle and seek food and supplies while surviving day-to-day. They conduct a variety of simple activities such as washing clothes and bathing. Chito regularly writes in a journal, collects books, and drives the Kettenkrad. Yuuri takes on a protection role and wields a rifle.

During their journey, they encounter a man named Kanazawa, who is mapping out one of the levels of a large city. He gives the girls his camera in return for the girls giving him food, before he leaves after having helped them reach the next level of the city. They next encounter a woman named Ishii after their Kettenkrad breaks down. The girls help Ishii complete the plane that she was building, and she helps them fix the Kettenkrad in return. Ishii subsequently attempts to leave in the plane, heading to the city across the water, though the plane breaks down shortly after its liftoff.

Ishii leaves them information on a facility that grows potatoes and creates rations before they leave, and the two girls capitalize on this opportunity. They pass by a series of black slabs filled with drawers, which Chito deduces are graves, before ascending to the next level of the city. They destroy a construction robot in an aquarium to save a fish after having a discussion with the caretaker robot.

The two girls find a cat-like creature they name Nuko (Note: Nuko's name is derived from neko (猫), the Japanese word for "cat," so to preserve the pun, Amazon's subtitles for the anime refer to Nuko as "Cut," while Yen Press' translation of the manga calls the creature "Ket.") after exploring a drinking hole; Nuko can communicate with the girls via radio signals. They decide to follow such signals which eventually leads them to a submarine. The camera's images are synchronized to a computer that displays pictures and videos of various past events. Yuuri is eaten by a larger version of Nuko; she is released shortly after and the adult Nuko informs the girls that Nuko is part of a species that consumes and stabilizes unstable energy. Before the creatures ascend into the sky with Nuko, they inform Chito and Yuuri that they are the only two humans left on this level. (Note: The anime concludes at this point, though the manga continues for two more volumes.)

Chito and Yuuri continue on despite this. They encounter an art museum as well as a research facility, discovering rockets that people attempted to leave in during the war. Their Kettenkrad finally breaks down and cannot be repaired. Chito is forced to burn her books in order to have warm water. They finally reach the top of the city and discover it to be desolate. There, they go to sleep, resting against the wall of the stairwell.

== Characters ==
Chito (チト)
Voiced by: Inori Minase (Japanese); Cat Thomas (English)
One of the two main protagonists, nicknamed "Chi-chan". She has a wide knowledge of machines and drives the Kettenkrad. She is literate and an avid reader. Though generally calm and composed, she can be riled by Yuuri on occasion. She often dwells on the past and worries about the future.
Yuuri (ユーリ, Yūri)
Voiced by: Yurika Kubo (Japanese); Juliet Simmons (English)
The second main protagonist, nicknamed "Yuu" by Chito. She is more easy-going than Chito, and cannot read, but is proficient with rifles and an accurate shooter who takes on a role of protector. She rides in the back of the Kettenkrad. Yuuri has little fear of the unknown and is quite adventurous, often acting on instinct and emotion.
Kanazawa (カナザワ)
Voiced by: Akira Ishida^{Ep. 3 credits} (Japanese); Mark X. Laskowski (English)
A traveler that Chito and Yuuri meet while trying to find a path to the upper levels of the city. He is a cartographer who wants to map the entire city. He gifts his camera to Yuuri and Chito when he leaves them to continue his mapping project.
Ishii (イシイ)
Voiced by: Kotono Mitsuishi^{Ep. 6 credits} (Japanese); Stephanie Wittels (English)
A scientist who lives in an abandoned airbase, building an airplane based on old records. She wants to fly to a city that is on the opposite shore. She helps fix Chito and Yuuri's Kettenkrad and enlists their help to finish the airplane. She gives Yuuri and Chito potatoes and tells them where to find more.
Nuko (ヌコ)
Voiced by: Kana Hanazawa^{Ep. 10 credits} (Japanese); Kalin Coates (English)
Named Ket in the English manga translation. A mysterious, cat-like creature that is long and white, which Chito and Yuuri pick up on their journey. It communicates with the girls via radio signals. Nuko can shape-shift to activate mechanisms and likes eating bullets. It is later discovered to be part of a species which consumes weapons and power sources to stabilize them. It gets reunited with its own kind on the submarine, and leaves with them.

=== Minor characters ===
Eringi (エリンギ)
Voiced by: Sumi Shimamoto (Japanese); Shelley Calene-Black (English)
The adult form of Nuko's species. It consumes high-energy weapons, machinery, and substances in order to stabilize them. It uses radio waves as its language and travels between cities by expanding its umbrella-like top.
Autonomous Machine (自律機械)
Voiced by: Hiroaki Enoki (Japanese); Kregg Daily (English)
The robot in charge of section management at the aquarium. It is equipped with "empathy capability" to communicate with humans.
Construction Machine (建設機械)
The robot responsible for maintenance in the area around the aquarium. It was responsible for maintaining infrastructure but began dismantling the aquarium due to a bug.
Female students (女子学生)
Voiced by: Rie Takahashi, Natsumi Okamoto, and Natsumi Fujiwara (Japanese)
Three female high school students. They give a research report on a small machine they operated in one of the videos on Kanazawa's camera when it is synced to the submarine's computer.
Old Man (オジリさん)
Voiced by: Motomu Kiyokawa (Japanese); John Swasey (English)
An old man who raised Chito and Yuuri. He sent the two girls with the Kettenkrad to ascend to the city's upper levels. He owned many of the books that Chito has.
Woman in the photo (写真の女性)
An unnamed woman who appears in a photo with Kanazawa. She previously travelled with him, but her whereabouts is unknown.

== Production ==
=== Manga ===
Girls' Last Tour was Tsukumizu's first original work. The manga Blame! influenced their worldview, while Girls' Last Tour's message was inspired by the works of Haruki Murakami and Kaori Ekuni, especially Haruki's "Norwegian Wood" and "Dance Dance Dance" along with Kaori's "Twinkle Twinkle Hikaru". The series initially began as a short story, which would later become Chapter 3 of Volume 1. The story was written by Tsukumizu in college; they initially studied art with the goal of becoming an art teacher but began drawing manga "on a whim."

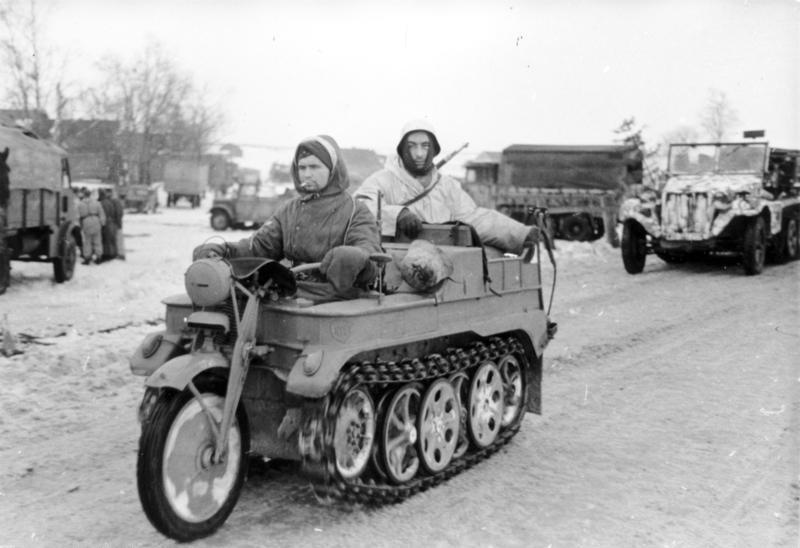
Two German soldiers ride a Kettenkrad in 1943; Tsukumizu added the vehicle to Girls' Last Tour after seeing it in Saving Private Ryan

Tsukumizu was interested in war movies while creating Girls' Last Tour. They saw a Kettenkrad in Saving Private Ryan and decided to incorporate it into the story as an ideal vehicle for Chito and Yuuri to travel in. The helmets the girls wear are modeled after ones from real life—Chito's after the British Brodie helmet from World War I, and Yuuri's after the German Stahlhelm from the same war. Yuuri also carries a Japanese Type 38 rifle.

Tsukumizu's process for creating scenes began with coming up with a story, a punchline, and something to raise awareness of a value. Afterwards, they would sketch the background and create a story that fit the setting and theme. They drew scenes with a pencil, then imported them onto a computer to ink and tone using Clip Studio Paint. Tsukumizu said that Chito and Yuuri were "born from expressing the questions" that they had, and that the two characters speak for Tsukumizu in those questions. According to Tsukumizu, Kanazawa and Ishii live with a goal in mind while Chito and Yuuri travel aimlessly; Tsukumizu said that the characters were born from questions like "[h]ow do we live our lives to find true happiness, and what is the right thing to do?"

=== Anime ===
"Our goal is to show the leisurely daily life of two girls, while allowing the audience to rediscover the value of things around them from their pure perspectives." [女子の二人のゆったりとした日常が感じられて、なおかつ彼女たちの純粋な目線で身近にあるものの価格を再発見するようなものを目指しています。]

— Takaharu Ozaki, TVアニメ少女終末旅行公式設定資料集 [TV Anime Girls' Last Tour Official Setting Materials Collection], page 82

At about two-thirds of the way through production of the manga, an anime adaptation was proposed. Its director, Takaharu Ozaki, discussed its ending with Tsukumizu and asked them to come up with an ending to the manga. After reading the manga, Takaharu said that he wanted a spiral-shaped scene; Tsukumizu took this as an opportunity to arrange a large spiral staircase at the end of the manga for Chito and Yuuri to climb. White Fox, the animation studio behind the anime adaptation, initially had doubts that the manga's style was suitable for thirty-minute long episodes and thought that a length of fifteen minutes would be more appropriate for each episode. The studio's president, Takeru Iwasa, cited an example of a movie with only two characters and almost no dialogue while arguing in favor of thirty-minute episodes; the studio subsequently agreed.

==== Direction ====
Takaharu said that the whole work should feel like a spiral; where one thing ends, another begins. He felt that in terms of emotional portrayals, Chito and Yuuri had to feel that being by one another's side was the most important thing. The anime added various sound effects to highlight the feeling of silence; for example, the sound of water was emphasized, since water served as a symbol of life in a mechanical environment with almost no living things.

The anime's script coordinator, Kazuyuki Fudeyasu, asked Tsukumizu about plot details that would be used only for the anime. Among the details added were Chito's memory of her and Yuuri leaving their grandfather. Kazuyuki also changed aspects that he believed would show the depth of the relationship between the two girls; the first chapter of the manga had Chito covering herself and then Yuuri with a blanket before going to sleep, which was changed in the anime adaptation to Chito placing the blanket over Yuuri before covering herself.

==== Art and animation ====
Illustrations of the bodies and heads (from various angles) of Chito and Yuuri, the main protagonists of Girls' Last Tour

The character design was done by Mai Toda, who decided that Chito and Yuuri's designs should be kept simple. Their eyebrows were drawn as a thin line, which made it challenging to express their emotions. The anime also added reflections to their eyes, a detail not present in the manga. The ruins that make up the background were given a special aesthetic effect to avoid depicting it as a messy and dirty place, while the art director Masakazu Miyake incorporated color into the background to not have it appear monotonous and grey.

A portion of the storyboard for the anime's opening theme, done by Takaharu. The left box contains a sketch of the shot, middle box gives directions on how the characters and scene moves, and the right box shows dialogue.

The storyboards for the opening theme were done by Takaharu. The storyboards included directions for camera techniques and how the overall composition of scenes should look. Additionally, the ending theme's animation was done by Tsukumizu and consisted of about 400 pencil drawings. They had initially envisioned a peaceful scene of Chito and Yuuri lighting a fire, but changed their mind after hearing the music and instead decided to show the two girls playing and teasing each other.

The average number of shots in each episode ranges from 250 to 270. There are also about one hundred 3D scenes per episode, which includes the Kettenkrad and various robots.

==== Sound effects ====
Though the original manga was set in a silent post-apocalyptic world, various sound effects were used to highlight the feeling of silence. Natural phenomena such as wind and water still exist in an apocalypse, and the sound director Yuji Furuya believed they could be gradually added beginning in the first episode of the anime. The sounds of the ruined city and the Kettenkrad were among those used to emphasize silence. Mechanical sound effects, such as the sounds of signals coming from the robots taking care of the fish in the aquarium, were created by Yuji after processing Morse code. The Kettenkrad's sound effect came from a mix of the onomatopoeia "dong dong dong dong" (totototo) that appeared in the manga as well as the sounds of small fishing boats, tractors, and tanks. For a segment of the fifth episode, "The Sound of Rain", the sound of falling raindrops was specially arranged. The sound that appeared with raindrops in the first episode was made realistic, and then percussion-sounding rain was combined with the anime's opening song to create a sound like both rain and music.

==== Music ====
"Regarding "Girls' Last Tour," when I saw the teaser visual, I felt that the amount of information conveyed through the visuals was already very dense, so I didn't feel the need to take an overly elaborate approach with the music." [「少女終末旅行」に関しては、ティザービジュアルを見た時点で映像が持つ情報量が濃密だと感じたので、音楽の面で過剰なアプローチをする感覚はなかったです。]

— Kenichiro Suehiro, TVアニメ少女終末旅行公式設定資料集 [TV Anime Girls' Last Tour Official Setting Materials Collection], page 105

The composer for the anime's soundtrack, Kenichiro Suehiro, read the manga and initially considered using music in the style of Brian Eno, which largely consists of ambient music. However, Takaharu requested that the music be performed in a sung style with unplugged instruments. Three pieces were completed by Suehiro, who then used them as a basis for the remainder of the soundtrack. He used a harp to emphasize the atmosphere between Chito and Yuuri, and also incorporated Nocturne in E-flat major, Op. 9, No. 2 by Frédéric Chopin. To assist with vocals, he invited the singer MAYUKO; she subsequently inserted new words into the vocals. Kenichiro said that he did not want the songs to be too long, but also felt that the work required longer songs. He had taken a similar approach when composing music for the anime Re:Zero in 2014.

The anime's opening theme, titled "Ugoku Ugoku" (動く、動く, Moving, Moving) was composed by Mao Kai. He wanted to emphasize the characters' perspective rather than the work's worldview, so he created the song with the inspiration of Chito and Yuuri constantly talking back and forth. The ending theme, titled "One More Night", was arranged by emon(Tes.) and composed by Hige Driver. The Japanese pronunciation of "not yet finished" in the song sounds similar to its title. The insert song "The Sound of Raindrops" was created by baker. It was based on the sound of water droplets falling onto empty pots and cans, with the sounds then combined into a rhythm. It also served as the ending theme of the final episode at the suggestion of sound director Jin Aketagawa.

==== Voice acting ====
Chito was voiced by Inori Minase, and Yuuri was voiced by Yurika Kubo. During the voice acting process, they were permitted to speak freely and be unrestricted, which was appreciated by Tsukumizu since he believed it expressed some of the work's more ambiguous aspects. Inori and Yurika performed the opening and ending themes.

The English dub cast of Girls' Last Tour was announced on November 16, 2018, at that year's Anime NYC.

== Media ==
=== Manga ===
Girls' Last Tour was written and illustrated by Tsukumizu. It was serialized in Shinchosha's Kurage Bunch online magazine between February 21, 2014, and January 12, 2018, and collected in six tankōbon volumes. Yen Press released the series in North America, Chingwin Publishing Group released the series in Taiwan, Tianjin People's Fine Arts Publishing House released the series in China, Tsuruyama Culture Publishing House released the series in South Korea, and AST released the series in European Russia.

A limited edition of volume 1 was released by Shosen Grande and Shosen Book Tower in 2014. It included an explanatory page about the workings of the Kettenkrad by Takaaki Suzuki, who had previously done research and worked on the scripts for the anime Girls und Panzer and Strike Witches. A limited edition released by Melon Books included a booklet by Tsukumizu titled "Girls' Weekend Trip" (少女週末旅行). Comic Toranoana and Sanyodo distributed illustration cards and Kikuya Bookstore and Bunch Comics distributed papers as purchase bonuses.

Two manga anthologies illustrated by various artists such as Hatopopoko, atto, and Shinya Komatsu were released in 2017.

A prologue manga, titled Kaisō Toshi Danpen-Shū, began serialization on Kurage Bunch on June 26, 2026.

==== Volumes ====
No.	Original release date	Original ISBN	English release date	English ISBN
1	November 8, 2014	978-4-10-771781-8	May 23, 2017	978-0-31-647062-9
2	July 9, 2015	978-4-10-771830-3	August 22, 2017	978-0-31-647064-3
3	February 9, 2016	978-4-10-771874-7	November 14, 2017	978-0-31-647068-1
4	November 9, 2016	978-4-10-771929-4	February 27, 2018	978-0-31-641598-9
5	September 8, 2017	978-4-10-772009-2	December 11, 2018	978-1-97-538093-9
6	March 9, 2018	978-4-10-772060-3; 978-4-10-772019-1 (LE)	February 19, 2019	978-1-97-532903-7

=== Anime ===
An anime television series adaptation by White Fox was announced by Kadokawa at Anime Expo 2017 alongside the release of a teaser visual, with Takaharu Ozaki directing, Kazuyuki Fudeyasu in charge of series composition, and Mai Toda adapting the character designs for animation. The series aired in Japan between October 6 and December 22, 2017, on AT-X and other stations. Sentai Filmworks licensed the series and simulcast streamed it on Anime Strike. MVM Films licensed the series in the United Kingdom and Muse Communication licensed the series in South and Southeast Asia.

==== Episodes ====
Each episode consists of two to three short, interconnecting stories.

No.	Title (Note: All English episode titles are taken from Anime Strike.)	Original release date
1	"Starry Sky"; Transliteration: "Hoshizora" (Japanese: 星空)	October 6, 2017
1	"War"; Transliteration: "Sensō" (Japanese: 戦争)	October 6, 2017
In a time following a massive war, two girls, Chito and Yuuri, travel aimlessly through a dark abandoned factory in their Kettenkrad. After Yuuri slobbers all over her hand during her sleep, Chito realizes that they can use a wet finger to find a way out by feeling the direction of the breeze and they emerge to see a starry sky. The next day, the girls explore a battlefield from the apocalyptic war and come across an abandoned plane. They find explosives and rations. Surprisingly, Yuuri pulls her gun on Chito and demands the last piece in a ration pack.
2	"Bath"; Transliteration: "Furo" (Japanese: 風呂)	October 13, 2017
2	"Journal"; Transliteration: "Nikki" (Japanese: 日記)	October 13, 2017
2	"Laundry"; Transliteration: "Sentaku" (Japanese: 洗濯)	October 13, 2017
Taking shelter from a snowstorm, Chito and Yuuri discover a power plant with hot running water and they use it to fill a metal tank to take a makeshift bath. Chito becomes upset at Yuuri when she throws one of Chito's books onto the fire to keep warm during the night. The next day, after the storm passes, the girls collect drinking water in a river created by melting snow. They decide to wash their clothes as well and come across a dead fish which they roast for dinner.
3	"Encounter"; Transliteration: "Sōgū" (Japanese: 遭遇)	October 20, 2017
3	"City"; Transliteration: "Toshi" (Japanese: 都市)	October 20, 2017
3	"Streetlights"; Transliteration: "Gaitō" (Japanese: 街灯)	October 20, 2017
While searching for the source of the fish they ate, the girls are impeded by a chasm dividing the city. They encounter another survivor named Kanazawa after he demolishes a building to create a bridge across the gap. Kanazawa has been mapping the abandoned city and hitches a ride with the girls as they make their way using his maps. They reach the base of a tower and the group take an external freight elevator towards the upper levels of the city. However, the elevator suddenly tilts, causing Kanazawa to drop his maps and he becomes despondent. Yuuri manages to cheer him up, and in gratitude Kanazawa gives the girls his camera. As Kanazawa sets off alone to start redrawing his maps, night falls and the girls watch the street lights come on.
4	"Photograph"; Transliteration: "Shashin" (Japanese: 写真)	October 27, 2017
4	"Temple"; Transliteration: "Jiin" (Japanese: 寺院)	October 27, 2017
Yuuri uses Kanazawa's camera to take photographs of some unusual tall, white stone statues around the city while Chito discovers the camera's self-timer. Later, the girls are exploring a temple when their lantern suddenly goes out. Yuuri fumbles around in the darkness until they both discover a bright room with a pond and fake metal lily pads.
5	"House"; Transliteration: "Jūkyo" (Japanese: 住居)	November 3, 2017
5	"Nap"; Transliteration: "Hirune" (Japanese: 昼寝)	November 3, 2017
5	"The Sound of Rain"; Transliteration: "Amaoto" (Japanese: 雨音)	November 3, 2017
The girls explore the city and spend the night in an sparsely furnished apartment, picturing what it would be like to live in a house. Feeling tired after staying up all night, Chito takes a midday nap and has peculiar dreams in which she is threatened by a gigantic Yuuri. Later, the girls shelter from the rain in some ruins, taking an interest in the sound the dripping rain makes when hitting various objects.
6	"Accident"; Transliteration: "Koshō" (Japanese: 故障)	November 10, 2017
6	"Technology"; Transliteration: "Gijutsu" (Japanese: 技術)	November 10, 2017
6	"Takeoff"; Transliteration: "Ririku" (Japanese: 離陸)	November 10, 2017
While exploring the city, the Kettenkrad breaks down and Chito cannot fix it. The girls encounter a woman named Ishii who offers to fix their vehicle in exchange for helping her. Together they finish constructing a simple airplane which Ishii is building from old plans in an effort to escape and reach a neighboring city. Once completed, Ishii sets off in her airplane, only for it to fall apart shortly after take-off. Luckily, she manages to parachute out safely and she slowly drifts down to the lower levels of the city.
7	"Labyrinth"; Transliteration: "Meiro" (Japanese: 迷路)	November 17, 2017
7	"Cooking"; Transliteration: "Chōri" (Japanese: 調理)	November 17, 2017
The girls enter a labyrinth of large pipes while following Ishii's map to a food manufacturing plant. Chito struggles with her fear of heights as she and Yuuri walk on top of the pipes before discovering there is a actually pathway inside them. They eventually find a facility filled with machines and cooking ingredients; powdered potato, sugar and salt. The girls deduce that they were used to make rations, and using the ingredients they bake their own food bars using one of the huge ovens.
8	"Memory"; Transliteration: "Kioku" (Japanese: 記憶)	November 24, 2017
8	"Spiral"; Transliteration: "Rasen" (Japanese: 螺旋)	November 24, 2017
8	"Moonlight"; Transliteration: "Gekkō" (Japanese: 月光)	November 24, 2017
Back outdoors, the girls discover a strange place featuring tall black slabs filled with drawers. Yuuri finds a mysterious device and other seemingly meaningless objects inside them. Chito deduces that the drawers are graves containing the belongings of those who have died so they would be remembered. Afterwards, the girls ascend a spiralling path up another tower in their Kettenkrad. They are forced to take an outside path which dangerously collapses behind them, but they manage to reach the summit. Exploring the top of the tower, the girls find some bottles of beer and spend the night getting drunk under the moonlight.
9	"Technology"; Transliteration: "Gijutsu" (Japanese: 技術)	December 1, 2017
9	"Aquarium"; Transliteration: "Suisō" (Japanese: 水槽)	December 1, 2017
9	"Life"; Transliteration: "Seimei" (Japanese: 生命)	December 1, 2017
While exploring a facility, the girls are surprised by a large construction robot which is oblivious to their presence. They then discover an aquarium containing a single fish guarded by a robotic caretaker. It explains that the facility was once used for fish farming. The robot allows the girls to swim in one of the empty aquarium tanks, although Chito almost drowns. Later, the large construction robot begins dismantling the facility apparently due to a bug in its programming. This leads Chito to engage the caretaker robot in a discussion about what it means to be alive. Fearing for the fish's life, the girls save it by destroying the construction robot using explosives.
10	"Train"; Transliteration: "Densha" (Japanese: 電車)	December 8, 2017
10	"Wavelength"; Transliteration: "Hachō" (Japanese: 波長)	December 8, 2017
10	"Capture"; Transliteration: "Hokaku" (Japanese: 捕獲)	December 8, 2017
The girls drive their Kettenkrad onto a goods train, finding its carriages filled with broken down machines. They disembark at the last station and ride an inclined elevator towards the top of the building. As they ascend, Yuuri starts hearing music coming from the radio she picked up earlier which they hear more clearly as they reach the surface. The next day, as the girls explore a large hole for some drinking water, they discover a small long, white life-form. They discover that it can communicate with them using their radio. Naming it "Nuko", the girls decide to take it with them on their journey.
11	"Culture"; Transliteration: "Bunka" (Japanese: 文化)	December 15, 2017
11	"Destruction"; Transliteration: "Hakai" (Japanese: 破壊)	December 15, 2017
11	"The Past"; Transliteration: "Kako" (Japanese: 過去)	December 15, 2017
Yuuri discovers that Nuko likes to eat bullets and begins feeding it while Chito finds a book on war and civilization written in English. They soon arrive at a huge clockwork-type contraption, where music starts playing on the radio again. They decide to head towards the source of the broadcast. The girls are interrupted by an incredibly large robot which crashes down in front of them. Nuko powers up the robot and Yuuri tries out some of its weapons, causing massive destruction to the city. The next day, the girls follow the music's signal to a still functioning submarine lying in the snow, inside of which they find an array of nuclear missiles.
12	"Connection"; Transliteration: "Setsuzoku" (Japanese: 接続)	December 22, 2017
12	"Friends"; Transliteration: "Nakama" (Japanese: 仲間)	December 22, 2017
While exploring the submarine, the girls inadvertently synchronize their camera to the submarine's computer and it displays their photographs, plus those Kanazawa took before giving them the camera. Among the computer files, they find videos of people and past events, including the war which led to the destruction of humanity. A larger Nuko, resembling the pillars they encountered earlier, suddenly appears and swallows Yuuri; Chito pursues the creature outside the submarine and finds Yuuri safe as the creature had only wanted to ingest her radio. The creature then explains that their purpose is to consume and stabilise unstable energy, and that that their work in the city has finished. More creatures emerge from the missile tubes as the creature says that Yuuri and Chito are the only humans they have detected up to this level. They then drift upwards together like dandelion seeds and take Nuko with them. With the submarine now completely shut down, Chito and Yuuri continue their journey towards the top level of the city, with a new sense of camaraderie and their importance to each other.

=== Girls' Last Class ===
A twelve-episode series titled Girls' Last Class (少女週末授業) was released as a short spinoff OVA. The work features Chito and Yuuri as schoolgirls, with characters and objects from Girls' Last Tour appearing as teachers. It ran starting on October 6, 2017, with episodes being released each Friday and the series running parallel to the main anime. It was uploaded on the Kadokawa YouTube channel and broadcast on the AT-X television network; Girls' Last Class was also temporarily released as a bonus for those who had purchased the anime. Each episode was a minute and a half long.

=== Subsequent appearances ===
Two unnamed characters with identical appearance and behavior to Chito and Yuuri appear as guest characters in Tsukumizu's second manga, Shimeji Simulation. The first volume was released in 2020, and the last volume was released in 2024.

== Reception ==
=== Accolades ===
==== Manga ====
In 2019, Girls' Last Tour won the 50th Seiun Award in the Best Comic category. The English release of the first two volumes were included on the American Library Association's list of 2018 Great Graphic Novels for Teens.

==== Anime ====
The series won the "Best Slice of Life" category at the 2nd Crunchyroll Anime Awards in 2018. IGN listed Girls' Last Tour as one of the best anime of the 2010s, describing it as a "morose anime" which is "made brighter through [Chito and Yuuri's] perspective on a barren world". It was named the best anime of Fall 2017 by Anime News Network.

=== Critical reception ===
==== Manga ====
The manga's post-apocalyptic premise was generally well-received. Horn of The Fandom Post called the manga's premise "absolutely fantastic" and opined that it explored an undercovered genre. Similarly, Beatrix Urkowitz of The Comics Journal considered it to be the best long-form narrative comic of the 2010s, writing that it "shows an apocalypse which has opportunities for joy". James Nicoll of Reactor highlighted the manga's nature as an iyashikei story, a genre with a "soothing effect", and found it to be "done well" despite the unusual choice of setting.

The manga's atmosphere was widely discussed. Urkowitz described it as "incredibly sensitive while being utterly unsentimental", while Amy McNulty of Anime News Network observed a "quiet stillness [...] like the blankets of snow that fall throughout" the story, finding it "slow-paced and full of subtle moments". Sean Gaffney of Manga Bookshelf stated that it was relaxing and compared it to the "last slice-of-life moe manga you'd read before the end times cast the universe into heat death."

The overall plot was more divisive. Urkowitz argued that the main characters' seeming lack of direction is an essential part of the story's purpose, and that its portrayal of living in the present was intended for "those who don't have the privilege to plan for the future". In contrast, Nik Freeman of Anime News Network was struck by how "pointless" it felt and found it less optimistic than described by others.

Regarding the art, McNulty praised Tsukumizu's illustrations, calling them "stunning" and intentionally "sketch-like". She considered Chito and Yuuri's character designs "cute", though possibly to an intentionally overdone degree. Rebecca Silverman of Anime News Network characterized the art style as "surreal", particularly through the use of different levels of detail for the background and characters.

The story was described by several critics as having themes of hope. Urkowitz felt that the narrative's "most remarkable quality" was that "it does not despair"—despite the dystopian setting, Chito and Yuuri continue to enjoy life. She argued that it "poses a utopian question: If moments of happiness are possible even at the end of the world, what might be possible now?" Similarly, McNulty analyzed a specific scene where the girls help give a photographer a reason to keep living, calling it a "touching theme" for showing "there's always more to hope for" and concluding that the story offers "gentle optimism in an isolated existence".

==== Anime ====
The anime received positive reviews from several critics. Gabriella Ekens of Anime News Network considered the series a "minor masterpiece", concluding that it was "one of those special shows that makes you feel less alone in the world." Michael Goldstein of Otaku USA called it "poetry in motion" through its focus on the main characters' journey, rather than their difficult situation, and described it as an iyashikei ("healing") story. Dee of Anime Feminist named it as "one of the finest atmospheric stories of the year". Steven Pearce of The Encyclopedia of Science Fiction likewise described it as a fine anime.

Regarding the series' more serious themes, Onosume of Anime UK News opined that beyond the "slow pace and slice-of-life style", it carried an "engaging deeper narrative" with its characters and message. Dee felt it was "neither optimistic nor despairing" and showed how people find meaning, ultimately resulting in a "heartbreakingly bleak and warmly peaceful" tone. Pearce similarly highlighted the charm of the two protagonists, whose friendship tempered the increasingly sombre atmosphere. He noted that the story developed slowly before gathering momentum in its final three episodes.

Several reviewers found the anime emotionally impactful. Steve Jones of Anime News Network considered it "one of the most emotionally affecting shows of the year" with a "great balance of lighthearted and heavier moments". Nicole Maclean of THEM Anime Reviews deemed the show's emotional range as one of its "strongest" points, calling the story "often funny, sometimes cute, ultimately profoundly sad" as well as "beautifully made".

The anime's production value received warm comments, with Onosume of Anime UK News commending the "depth and complexity" of the backgrounds, such as its use of lighting to set the mood. Furthermore, they regarded the show's "greatest achievement" to be its "incredible" sound design and effects, which they felt enhanced the story's realism. Ekens called the production "gorgeous" with its "aesthetic and atmospheric excellence", with particular praise for its imagery and character designs. Pearce contrasted the simple character designs with the detailed and visually interesting backgrounds and technology, and also praised the memorable soundtrack.

Analyzing the story's overall themes, Onosume argued that the "core message" was ultimately one of being anti-war, which was conveyed through imagery of weaponry in the post-apocalyptic landscape. Similarly, Jones contended that it was "frank about mankind's destructive tendencies", but also opined that it was "warm and life-affirming". Dee opined that the story used its setting and characters to "ask questions about life, death, and what it means to be human" with "elegance that was rare to find". Pearce also appreciated how philosophical questions and details of the ruined world's history emerged naturally during the protagonists' everyday search for food, fuel and distractions.
