= Risa Taneda =

Japanese voice actress

- 種田 梨沙
- Born: July 12, 1988 (age 38); Tokyo, Japan
- Occupation: Voice actress
- Years active: 2010–present
- Notable work: From the New World as Saki Watanabe; High School DxD as Xenovia Quarta; Beyond the Boundary as Mirai Kuriyama; Strike the Blood as Yukina Himeragi; Is the Order a Rabbit? as Rize Tedeza; Your Lie in April as Kaori Miyazono; Food Wars!: Shokugeki no Soma as Erina Nakiri; Utawarerumono as Kuon
- Height: 153 cm (5 ft 0 in)

Risa Taneda (種田 梨沙, Taneda Risa; born July 12, 1988) is a Japanese voice actress affiliated with Office Osawa talent agency. She is also a member of the voice actress idol unit Rhodanthe* (ローダンセ) since 2013, along with Nao Tōyama, Asuka Nishi, Manami Tanaka and Yumi Uchiyama. Some of her major roles include Mirai Kuriyama in Beyond the Boundary, Yukina Himeragi in Strike the Blood, Rize Tedeza in Is the Order a Rabbit?, Kaori Miyazono in Your Lie in April, and Erina Nakiri in Food Wars!: Shokugeki no Soma.

== Biography ==
=== Early life and education ===
Taneda was born in Tokyo. At the 7th grade, Taneda first learned about voice acting and became interested in it after listening to radio programs hosted by voice actors. Meanwhile, Taneda was also into the fantasy world of Harry Potter series. "I want to play in the series!" aspired Taneda.

During junior and senior high schools, she was prohibited to do entertainment activities. She had to teach herself acting by herself. Her method was to practice reading manga dialogue in her room. Because she often spent long periods talking to herself behind the closed doors, her parents became worried. Once, they rushed into her room to ask what was happening, and she told them for the first time that she wanted to be a voice actress. After persuading her parents, she applied for the assistant group of the voice actor radio program "Tomokazu & Miki's Radio Big Bang." and succeeded. She befriended fellow voice actor, Shiori Mikami who also served in assistant group.

In 2007, Taneda went to university in Tokyo. She majored in Design in Joshibi University of Art and Design and later graduated with a Bachelor of Arts. Taneda also holds a certification as middle school art teacher. While in the university, Taneda began to intern at the voice acting agency Office Osawa, and was successfully converted to an affiliated voice actress after an audition in 2009.

=== Narrator, voice acting and singing career ===
Taneda started his career with Office Osawa as a narrator. In her early days, the agency only gave Taneda two or three opportunities per year to participate in anime auditions.

In October 2011, Taneda made her voice acting debut as a narrator in the short anime film Sakura no Ondo (桜の温度). On July 1, 2012, Taneda's voice was heard in a TV anime for the first time as she was in Tari Tari Episode 1, voicing Midori Ueno.

In September 2012, Taneda voiced her first main character Saki Watanabe in the anime series From the New World. She also performed the ending theme Wareta Ringo (割れたリンゴ) and hosted a mini television program The Chronicle of From the New World (新世界よりクロニクル) on TV Asahi Channel (テレビ朝日CS). Although it was only her first main role, Taneda demonstrated impressive voice acting skills and played the three different ages of Saki Watanabe very well throughout the series. Later on, her career took off, and she voice-acted in many notable works, including Rize Tedeza in Is the Order a Rabbit?, Kaori Miyazono in Your Lie in April, Erina Nakiri in Food Wars: Shokugeki no Soma, and Kotoha Tanaka in The Idolmaster Million Live!.

In 2013, Taneda voiced one of the main characters, Aya Komichi (小路綾), in the anime Kin-iro Mosaic along with Nao Tōyama, Asuka Nishi, Manami Tanaka and Yumi Uchiyama. The cast later formed the seiyuu idol unit Rhodanthe* (ローダンセ). On the same year, she voiced Yukina Himeragi in the anime series Strike the Blood which expanded from anime television series into OVA series until 2022. Taneda was a cast as Xenovia Quarta in anime High School DxD New.

In 2014, Taneda was a cast as Neko Kuroha in Gokukoku no Brynhildr, Sachi Nagamiya in Glasslip, Sayumi Takanashi in Inou Battle wa Nichijou-kei no Naka de, and Kaori Miyazono in Your Lie in April. On the same year, she voiced a main character in visual novel, CHAOS;CHILD produced by MAGES.

In 2015, Taneda was a cast as Rory Mercury in GATE, Erina Nakiri in Shokugeki no Souma, Maname & Yukano in Ninja Slayer, Riveria Ljos Alf in Is It Wrong to Try to Pick Up Girls in a Dungeon?, and Yuri Flostre in Kuusen Madoushi Kouhosei no Kyoukan. Taneda voiced Dual in sci-fi animation film Garakowa: Restore the World animated by A-1 Pictures. Taneda voiced Mash Kyrielight in gacha mobile game Fate/Grand Order before succeeded by Rie Takahashi during her hiatus. Taneda voiced Yui Kusano in science fantasy role-playing video game, Princess Connect produced by Cygames. Taneda voiced Kuon in visual novel, Utawarerumono: Itsuwari no Kamen. In May 2015, Taneda became the first voice actress to appear in Japanese women's fashion magazine "AneCan".

In 2016, Taneda was a cast for Yatorishino Igsem in Nejimaki Seirei Senki: Tenkyou no Alderamin, and Tamaki Yurine in Luck & Logic. Taneda voiced Francoise Arnoul in animation film trilogy, Cyborg 009: Call of Justice.

Taneda gradually came back to voice acting with reprised her role as Rize Tedeza in animation film Gochuumon wa Usagi Desuka?? Dear My Sister in November 2017.

In 2018, Taneda landed a role as Ai Mizuno in idol anime Zombie Land Saga produced by MAPPA, Avex Pictures, and Cygames. Taneda was a cast as Theresa in Release the Spyce, Mayu in Lostorage Conflated Wixoss, and Kagari Hiiragi in Toji no Miko. In February 2018, Taneda reprised her role as Kotoha Tanaka in game THE IDOLM@STER MILLION LIVE! Theater Days after delayed implementation due the her hiatus. Taneda also performed in concert for the first time since her hiatus in "THE IDOLM@STER MILLION LIVE! 5thLIVE BRAND NEW PERFORM@NCE!!!" held at Saitama Super Arena in June 2nd and 3rd.

In 2019, Taneda was a anime cast as Momo Sakurahara in Oresuki, and Shoukaku, Zuikaku & Cygnet in Azur Lane The Animation. Taneda voiced Kuon in latest gacha game Utawarerumono: Lost Frag by AQUAPLUS.

In 2020, Taneda voiced Meteorite and Eyjafjalla in tower defense mobile game Arknights produced by Hypergryph. Chou!A&G+ announced the rebirth of Yumi & Risa Tokyo Rough Story radio program hosted by Taneda and Yumi Uchiyama on July 9th. Onsen Radio announced "Welcome to Salon de Taneda♪" solo monthly radio hosted by Taneda and started in July 12th.

In 2021, Taneda voiced Shirasu Azusa in gacha game Blue Archive by Nexon.

In 2022, Taneda reprised her role in anime television as Kuon in Utawarerumono: Futari no Hakuoro, Meteorite in Arknights: Prelude to Dawn, Yui in Princess Connect! Re:Dive Season 2, Nachi & Ashigara in Kantai Collection: Itsuka no Umi de, and MG3 in Dolls Frontline.

In 2023, Taneda reprised her role in anime television as Kotoha Tonoka in THE iDOLM@STER MILLION LIVE! and Meteorite in Arknights: Perish in Frost.

In 2025, Taneda reprised her role in anime film Zombie Land Saga: Yumeginga Paradise as Ai Mizuno and anime television Arknights: Rise from Ember as Meteorite.

=== Hiatus ===
On September 1, 2016, Office Osawa announced that Taneda would put her career on hiatus to focus on treatment for her throat. Her role of Kisaki Kondo from WWW.Working!! was replaced by Nana Mizuki.

On August 4, 2017, Office Osawa announced that her treatment was successful and she would gradually return to voice acting.

On August 14, 2022, Taneda announced on Instagram that she had undergone throat surgery again, had finished her recovery period, and had returned to work. Previously, she planned to announce it only after things stabilized due to concerns about causing worry and the uncertainty of the post-operative observation period. Taneda stated that she would continue throat treatment and care in the future and would actively give her all to her work. The specific illness was not disclosed this time either.

On May 16, 2023, Office Osawa announced that Taneda tested positive for COVID-19 via PCR.

== Stand-in voice actors ==
Risa's replacements in her previous roles are as below:

- Rie Takahashi – Fate/Grand Order: Mash Kyrielight
- Hisako Kanemoto – Food Wars!: Shokugeki no Soma (The Second Plate OVA, The Third Plate): Erina Nakiri
- Nana Mizuki – WWW.Working!!: Kisaki Kondō
- Asami Sanada – Chaos;Child: Mio Kunosato
- Kaori Ishihara – Break Out: Narration
- Ayako Kawasumi – Is It Wrong to Try to Pick Up Girls in a Dungeon?: Sword Oratoria: Riveria Ljos Alf
- Ai Kakuma – A Sister's All You Need (2nd drama CD and anime): Miyako Shirakawa
- Inori Minase – The Legend of Heroes: Trails of Cold Steel III: Altina Orion

== Personal Life ==
Taneda is the youngest of three siblings, and both her older brothers are married.

Taneda adopted 3 cats at her home.

Her close friendship include Yumi Uchiyama, Mikako Takahashi, Afumi Hashi, Shiori Mikami, Yuri Yamaoka, Ai Kayano, Minami Takahashi, Rumi Ookubo, and Machico. Taneda is also often hanging out with other Strike the Blood cast (Asami Seto, Rina Hidaka, Saori Oonishi, Ikumi Hayama, Megumi Han, Yukiyo Fujii), GochiUsa cast (Ayane Sakura, Inori Minase, Maaya Uchida, Sora Tokui, Rie Murakawa), and Rhodanthe* members (Ayaka Suwa, Asuka Nishi, Nao Touyama, Manami Tanaka).

Taneda once had a persistent fever during the peak moment of her career. At the same time, the agency also refused Taneda's sick leave application and did note reduce her workload. As a result, Taneda had to continue to work with high fever for a long time, and was so busy that she did not even have time to see a doctor.

On April 4th, 2020, Taneda launched her Instagram.

== Filmography ==
=== Television and web animation ===
2012

- AKB0048: Yuuka's brother
- Battle Spirits: Sword Eyes: Woman B
- From the New World: Saki Watanabe
- Fushigi no Yappo Shima Pukipuki to Poi
- Love, Elections & Chocolate: Female student, female student C
- Natsuyuki Rendezvous: Kool
- Say "I love you": Asami Oikawa
- Tanken Driland: Mermaid Princess Sera
- Tari Tari: Midori Ueno
- To Love-Ru Darkness: Pretty girl (ep. 12)

2013

- A Certain Scientific Railgun S: Female student
- AKB0048 next stage: Yuuka's brother
- Battle Spirits: Sword Eyes: Maid, girl
- Beyond the Boundary: Mirai Kuriyama
- Boku wa Tomodachi ga Sukunai NEXT: Jenfa
- Gaist Crusher: Sakura Sango
- Genshiken Second Season: Fuji
- High School DxD New: Xenovia Quarta
- Kin-iro Mosaic: Aya Komichi
- Kotoura-san: Yu-chan, female student
- Golden Time: Solicitor
- Gargantia on the Verdurous Planet: Paraem
- Magi: The Labyrinth of Magic: Tiare
- My Girlfriend and Childhood Friend Fight Too Much: Kaoru Asoi
- Ro-Kyu-Bu! SS: Masami Fujii
- Strike the Blood: Yukina Himeragi
- The Devil Is a Part-Timer!: Girl
- Tokyo Ravens: Harutora Tsuchimikado (young), woman A, female student
- Unbreakable Machine-Doll: Cedric Granville/Alice Bernstein
- Yozakura Quartet: child A of 2nd street, girl 2, girl
- Yuyushiki: Yukari Hinata

2014

- Brynhildr in the Darkness: Neko Kuroha/Kuroneko
- If Her Flag Breaks: No. 0
- Is the Order a Rabbit?: Rize Tedeza
- Glasslip: Sachi Nagamiya
- Lady Jewelpet: Lillian
- Log Horizon 2: Seine, Chika
- M3 the dark metal: young Heito
- No Game No Life: Queen
- Recently, My Sister Is Unusual: Female student
- Selector Infected WIXOSS: Mayu
- selector spread WIXOSS: Mayu
- Tenkai Knights: Chooki Mason
- When Supernatural Battles Became Commonplace: Sayumi Takanashi
- Your Lie in April: Kaori Miyazono

2015

- Food Wars!: Shokugeki no Soma: Erina Nakiri
- Gate: Jieitai Kanochi nite, Kaku Tatakaeri: Rory Mercury
- Is the Order a Rabbit??: Rize Tedeza
- Hello!! Kin-iro Mosaic: Aya Komichi
- High School DxD BorN: Xenovia Quarta
- Is It Wrong to Try to Pick Up Girls in a Dungeon?: Riveria Ljos Alf
- Kantai Collection: Nachi, Ashigara, Haguro
- Log Horizon 2: Sejin
- Ninja Slayer From Animation: Dragon Yukano/Amnesia,
- Sky Wizards Academy: Yuri Floster
- The Rolling Girls: Ai Hibiki
- Ultimate Otaku Teacher: Matome Nishikujou
- Utawarerumono: The False Faces: Kuon
- Super Shorts Comics: Android Player

2016

- Aokana: Four Rhythm Across the Blue: Reiko Satōin
- Alderamin on the Sky: Yatorishino Igsem
- Food Wars! Shokugeki no Soma: The Second Plate: Erina Nakiri
- Gate: Jieitai Kanochi nite, Kaku Tatakaeri – Enryuu-hen: Rory Mercury
- Luck & Logic: Tamaki Yurine
- Undefeated Bahamut Chronicle: Celistia Ralgris

2017

- Hand Shakers: Schoolgirl

2018

- Butlers: Chitose Momotose Monogatari: Satsuki Mikami
- High School DxD Hero: Xenovia Quarta
- Junji Ito Collection: Yui
- Katana Maidens ~ Toji No Miko: Kagari Hiiragi
- Release the Spyce: Theresia
- Zombie Land Saga: Ai Mizuno
- Lostorage Conflated WIXOSS: Mayu
- Manga de Wakaru! Fate/Grand Order: Kiyohime

2019

- Grimms Notes The Animation: Akazukin, Jack, Little Red Wolf, Usagi Sangatsu, Child B, Association Women A
- Oresuki: Momo "Cherry" Sakurabara
- Azur Lane: Cygnet, Shōkaku & Zuikaku
- Star Twinkle Precure: Ohitsujiza

2020

- Is the Order a Rabbit? BLOOM: Rize Tedeza
- Princess Connect! Re:Dive: Yui/Yui Kusano (cameos and flashbacks only)
- Dolls Frontline -Frenzy Edition-: M1 Garand

2021

- Zombie Land Saga Revenge: Ai Mizuno
- Azur Lane: Slow Ahead!: Shōkaku & Zuikaku

2022

- Girls' Frontline: MG3
- Utawarerumono: Mask of Truth: Kuon
- Arknights: Prelude to Dawn: Meteorite
- Kantai Collection: Let's Meet at Sea: Nachi, Ashigara, Haguro
- Blue Archive 1.5 Anniversary Short Animation: Shirasu Azusa

2023

- The Idolmaster Million Live!: Kotoha Tanaka
- Arknights: Perish in Frost: Meteorite
- Zom 100: Bucket List of the Dead: Zombie 3

2024

- Fate/Grand Order Fujimaru Ritsuka ha Wakaranai Season 2: Kiyohime

2025

- Arknights: Rise from Ember: Meteorite

=== Original video animation (OVA) ===
- Arata-naru Sekai (2012): Yakusa
- Hori-san to Miyamura-kun (2012-2021): Female Student
- Sukitte Ii na yo. Dareka ga (2013): Asami Oikawa
- Gargantia on the Verdurous Planet: Far Beyond the Voyage (2014-2015): Paraem
- High School DxD BorN: Yomigaeranai Fushichou (2015): Xenovia
- High School DxD BorN: Teishi Kyoushitsu no Vampire – Oppai, Tsutsumimasu! (2015): Xenovia
- Your Lie in April:MOMENTS (2015): Kaori Miyazono
- Strike the Blood: Valkyria no Oukoku Hen OVA (2015): Yukina Himeragi
- Food Wars! Shokugeki no Soma OAD (2015-2018): Nakiri Erina
- Sky Wizards Academy: Lecty, Animal Caretaker (2016): Yuri Flostre
- Strike the Blood II OVA (2016-2017): Yukina Himeragi
- Yuyushiki: Komarasetari, Komarasaretari (2017): Yukari Hinata
- Utawarerumono: Tusukuru-koujo no Karei Naru Hibi (2018): Kuon
- Strike the Blood III OVA (2018-2019): Yukina Himeragi
- Is the Order a Rabbit?? ~Sing For You~ (2019): Rize Tedeza
- Strike the Blood: Kieta Seisou Hen OVA (2020): Yukina Himeragi
- Strike the Blood IV OVA (2020-2021): Yukina Himeragi
- Oresuki: Oretachi no Game Set (2020): Momo "Cherry" Sakurabara
- Strike the Blood Final OVA (2022): Yukina Himeragi

=== Theatrical animation ===
- Sakura no Ondo (2011): Narrator
- Beyond the Boundary: I'll Be Here – Past (2015): Mirai Kuriyama
- Beyond the Boundary: I'll Be Here – Future (2015): Mirai Kuriyama
- Garakowa -Restore the World- (2016): Dual
- Gekijouban Kantai Collection (2016): Akashi, Myoukou, Nachi, Ashigara, Haguro
- Is the Order a Rabbit?? Dear My Sister (2017): Rize Tedeza
- Kin-iro Mosaic: Thank You!! (2021): Aya Komichi
- Zombie Land Saga: Yumeginga Paradise (2025): Ai Mizuno
- Gekijouban Gochuumon wa Usagi Desuka? We Are Family! (TBA): Rize Tedeza

=== Video games ===
2012

- Glass Heart Princess: Manaka

2013

- Kantai Collection – Nachi, Ashigara, Haguro, Myōkō, Akashi, Samidare, Suzukaze, Shōhō
- Glass Heart Princess:PLATINUM: Manaka
- The Idolmaster Million Live!: Kotoha Tanaka

2014

- Dengeki Bunko: Fighting Climax: Yukina Himeragi
- Etrian Odyssey 2 Untold: The Fafnir Knight: Arianna
- Schoolgirl Strikers 2: Yui Chitose
- Fatal Frame: Maiden of Black Water: Yuri Kozukata
- The Legend of Heroes: Trails of Cold Steel II: Altina Orion

2015

- Fate/Grand Order: Mash Kyrielight, Marie Antoinette, Mata Hari, Kiyohime)
- Utawarerumono: Itsuwari no kamen: Kuon
- Valkyrie Drive -Bhikkhuni-: Koharu Tsukikage
- Princess Connect: Yui/Yui Kusano

2016

- Overwatch: D.Va
- Utawarerumono: Futari no Hakuoro: Kuon
- Girls' Frontline: M1 Garand, MG3, Thompson
- Is the order a rabbit?? Wonderful Party!: Rize Tedeza

2017

- Azur Lane: Cygnet, Shōkaku & Zuikaku
- Dragon Quest 8: Princess Medea
- Fire Emblem Echoes: Shadows of Valentia, Fire Emblem Heroes: Palla

2018

- The Idolmaster Million Live!: Theater Days: Kotoha Tanaka
- Digimon Re:Arise: Erismon
- Dragalia Lost: Sazanka
- Princess Connect! Re:Dive: Yui/Yui Kusano
- Utawarerumono: Zan: Kuon
- Super Smash Bros. Ultimate: Yuri Kozukata

2019

- Granblue Fantasy: Aster
- Arena of Valor: Violet (Japanese Voice), Violet (Dimension Breaker Skin)
- Arknights: Eyjafjalla, Meteorite, Eyjafjalla The Hvit Aska
- Utawarerumono: Lost Flag: Kuon

2020

- Venus Eleven Vivid!: Xenovia
- Illusion Connect: Mari
- Final Gear: Natasha, Nova
- World Flipper: Ai Mizuno

2021

- Utawarerumono: Zan 2: Kuon
- Blue Archive: Azusa Shirasu, Azusa (Racing)
- The Idolmaster: Starlit Season: Kotoha Tanaka
- Is It Wrong to Try to Pick Up Girls in a Dungeon? ~Memoria Freese~: Yukina Himeragi
- Dragon Quest Rivals: Princess Meteor

2022

- Gizoku Tantei Nosuri: Kuon
- Wixoss Multiverse: Mayu
- Princess Connect Grand Masters: Yui

2023

- Mobile Suit Gundam U.C. ENGAGE: Icelina Eschonbach

2024

- Horcrux College: Scalance

2025

- Houchi Shoujo: Inari Ookami
- Gacha Party: Candy Bomber

=== Drama CD ===
- Ichiban Ushiro No Daimao: Drama & Character Song Album – Ichiban Ushiro Ni Aru Kimochi (2010): Female student B
- Kyoukai no Kanata Drama CD: Slapstick Literary Club (2013), Mirai Kuriyama
- Like a Butterfly (2014): Yuri Kudō
- Sky Wizards Academy (2014): Yuri Flostre
- The Garden of sinners/recalled out summer (2014): Miyazuki Risu
- Neko to Watashi no Kinyōbi (2014): Mosko
- The Master of Ragnarok & Blesser of Einherjar (2014): Sigrun
- Fushigi so Resident Resident X X ~X'mas Special~ (2014): Ohagi
- Mahō Shōjo Ikusei Keikaku (2014): Shadow Gale
- Fate/Grand Order Mook Appendix (2015): Mash Kyrielight
- THE iDOLM@STER Million Live! (2015): Kotoha Tanaka
- Magika no Kenshi to Basileus (2015): Kanae Hayashizaki
- Imōto Sae Ireba Ii (2016).: Miyako Shirakawa
- I like OPPAI best in the world! (2019): Hana Harumi
- Zombie Land Saga Drama CD "Secret Before Christmas SAGA" (2021): Ai Mizuno

=== Dubbing ===
- Silent Hill: Revelation 3D (2013): Suki
- Movie 43 (2014): Amanda
- She-Ra and the Princesses of Power (2018-2020): Glimmer

=== Digital comics ===
- VOMIC γ Gamma (2015): Kitaka Kaiho
- Selector Infected WIXOSS ~Ruuko & Tama Final Chapter~ (2025): Mayu

=== Live-action film ===
- 2nd Photo Club!! (2009): Student

=== Radio ===
- Tomokazu & Miki's Radio Big Bang (2007-2008, Nippon Cultural Broadcasting): 9th Assistant
- Ren'ai Talk Variety Sukinayo. Bu (2012-2013, Chou!A&G+) with Nobunaga Shimazaki, & Yumi Uchiyama
- High School RADIO×RADIO DxD (2013, HiBiKi Radio Station with) with Azumi Asakura & Maaya Uchida
- StriB Radio: Yukina to Nagisa no Otonari Housoukyoku (2013-2020, HiBiKi Radio Station) with Rina Hidaka
- Kyoukai no Kanata: Fuyukai Radio (2013-2014, Onsen) with Yuri Yamaoka
- Taneda Risa to Nitta Emi no Shin-Tane Radio (2014, Chou!A&G+) with Emi Nitta
- Glasslip ~Kazemichi Radio~ (2014, Onsen & HiBiKi Radio Station) with Saori Hayami and Seria Fukugawa
- It's not "April", it's "You Lie". Radio (2014-2015, Onsen) with Ayane Sakura
- Rhodanthe*'s Chat Mosaic (2015-2022, FlyingDog)
- SHOKUGEKI NO SOMA ~TANEDA TAKAHASHI Cooking Academy~ (2015, Onsen) with Minami Takahashi
- Yumi & Risa Tokyo Rough Story (2015-2016, Chou!A&G+) with Yumi Uchiyama
- Is the Order a Radio?? ~Welcome to Rabbit House~ (2015-2021, Onsen) with Inori Minase, Maaya Uchida, Ayane Sakura, Satomi Satou, Youko Hikasa, & Saori Hayami
- Clockwork Spirit War Chronicles: Alderamin of the Heavenly Mirror Web Radio: Inori Taneda Empire (2016, Onsen) with Inori Minase
- Shokugeki no Sōma Ni no Sara presents: Taneda Takahashi no "Oagariyo, Matsuoka-san! (2016, Onsen) with Minami Takahashi and Matsuoka Yoshitsugu
- Is the Order a Radio?? ~WELCOME [U-sa-gi!]~ (2018-2019, Nippon Cultural Broadcasting)
- Yumi & Risa Tokyo Rough Story Comes Suddenly (2020-2026, Chou!A&G+ & Qlover) with Yumi Uchiyama
- Welcome to Salon de Taneda♪ (2020-, Onsen)
