= Mikako Izawa =

Japanese voice actress

- 井澤 美香子
- Born: September 6, 1994 (age 31)
- Occupation: Voice actress
- Agent: Sony Music Artists

Mikako Izawa (井澤 美香子, Izawa Mikako; born September 6, 1994) is a Japanese voice actress affiliated with Sony Music Artists.

== Television animation ==
- Amagi Brilliant Park (2014), Mutsumi Terano; Preschooler
- Locodol (2014), Satsuki Kashiba
- Is It Wrong to Try to Pick Up Girls in a Dungeon? (2015), Goddess A
- Hello! Kin-iro Mosaic (2015), Female Student B, Girl
- Re-Kan! (2015), Hanako-san
- To Love-Ru Darkness 2nd (2015), Girl
- Valkyrie Drive: Mermaid (2015), Mamori Tokonome
- Wakaba Girl (2015), Moeko Tokita
- Age 12 (2016), Miko Onda, Anzu Yamada, Student, Clerk
- Shōnen Maid (2016), Yu Nomura, Pet Owner
- Gabriel Dropout (2017), Dog, Tanaka, Chappi
- Kirakira PreCure a la Mode (2017), Girl
- Anima Yell! (2018), Uki Sawatari
- Assault Lily Bouquet (2020), Kaede Johan Nouvelle
- Assault Lily Fruits (2021), Kaede Johan Nouvelle
- Harem in the Labyrinth of Another World (2022), Rutina

== Original video animation (OVA) ==
- Amagi Brilliant Park (2015), Preschooler
- Locodol Christmas Special (2015), Satsuki Kashiwaba

== Film animation ==
- Kuro no Sumika: Chronus (2014), Female Student
- Grisaia: Phantom Trigger the Animation (2019), Shiori Arisaka

== Dubbing ==
- Pitch Perfect (2015), Kimmy Jin

== Web radio ==
- Izawa Mikako no honki! Anirabu (Chou! A&G+: October 2, 2012 - March 19, 2013)
- Puchidopod (Neopod: June 4 - August 14, 2013)
- Izawa Mikako Suwa Nanaka no Fuwa Sata (Chou! A&G+: July 11, 2015 - )
- Wakaba Radio (D Anime Store: July 31, 2015 - )
- Valkyrie Drive ~ Radio Mermaid (HiBiKi Radio Station: 2015 )
- Nagaku Yuki Izawa Mikako no Boke TWO Office (Radiotomo: 2016–2017 )

== Television program ==
- Chōryūha (TV Tokyo: June 5, 2015 - ), Narrator

== Video games ==
- Azur Lane (2018), HMS Neptune
