= Wakaba Girl =

Japanese manga and anime series

わかば＊ガール
- Genre: Comedy
- Manga
- Written by: Yui Hara
- Published by: Houbunsha
- Imprint: Manga Time KR Comics
- Magazine: Otome Tsūshin
- Original run: 2010 – 2013
- Volumes: 1
- Anime television series
- Directed by: Masaharu Watanabe
- Produced by: Asuka Yamazaki; Hiroyuki Kobayashi; Kazuhiro Kanemitsu; Kenji Yamaguchi; Mitsutoshi Ogura; Satoshi Fukao; Yoshiki Usa
- Written by: Jukki Hanada
- Music by: Kenji Kawai
- Studio: Nexus
- Licensed by: NA: Sentai Filmworks
- Original network: AT-X, Tokyo MX, BS11
- Original run: July 3, 2015 – September 25, 2015
- Episodes: 13

Wakaba Girl (わかば＊ガール, Wakaba Gāru) is a Japanese four-panel manga series written and illustrated by Yui Hara and published by Houbunsha. An anime television series adaptation by Nexus aired in Japan between July and September 2015.

== Plot ==
Wakaba Kohashi is "a slightly out-of-tune super" daughter of a well-to-do family. She looks like an elegant rich daughter, but admires the trendy "gyaru" fashion subculture. Her friends are the pure, innocent, fairy-tale-like Moeko, the capricious Mao, and Nao who used to be an athletic type of girl, but now loves the boys-love genre. Most of the series takes place at Shirozume Girls High School.

== Characters ==
Wakaba Kohashi (小橋 若葉, Kohashi Wakaba)
Voiced by: Ari Ozawa
Moeko Tokita (時田 萌子, Tokita Moeko)
Voiced by: Mikako Izawa
Mao Kurokawa (黒川 真魚, Kurokawa Mao)
Voiced by: Mao Ichimichi
Nao Mashiba (真柴 直, Mashiba Nao)
Voiced by: Rie Murakawa

== Media ==
=== Anime ===
An anime television series adaptation by Nexus aired in Japan between July 3, 2015 and September 25, 2015, and was simulcast by Crunchyroll. Character designs were created by Kana Ishida and the scripts were written by Jukki Hanada. The opening theme is "Hajimete Girls!" (初めてガールズ！) by Ray.

==== Episode list ====
No.	Title	Original release date
1	"My Dream is to Become a High School Girl" "Yume wa Joshi Kōsei desu" (夢は女子高生です)	July 3, 2015
Upon starting high school, Wakaba Kohashi, a rich girl wishing to be a gyaru, makes friends with her classmates, Moeko Tokita, Mao Kurokawa, and Nao Hashiba.
2	"In a D-Cup, Please" "Dī-kappu de O-negaishimasu" (Dカップでお願いします)	July 10, 2015
Wakaba becomes excited about going to get ice cream with her new friends.
3	"The Road to Becoming a Gyaru is Long" "Gyaru e no Michinori wa Tōi" (ギャルへの道のりは遠い)	July 17, 2015
Wakaba buys a galge under the impression that it is a game for gyaru, with Nao lending her one of her own games.
4	"So This Is A Knife" "Kore ga Hōchō desu ka" (これが包丁ですか)	July 24, 2015
Wakaba and the others go to Moeko's house, where they decide to make some cupcakes, only for Moeko to do everything herself.
5	"Rich Girls Are Not Fair" "Ojō-sama wa Zurui" (お嬢様はずるい)	July 31, 2015
Mao feels downhearted when a boy she kind of has a crush on appears to be interested in a girl from a rich school, so she decides to observe Wakaba in order to pick up her rich girl mannerisms.
6	"The Area of Fabric is Too Small" "Nuno no Menseki ga Chīsasugimasu" (布の面積が小さすぎます)	August 7, 2015
The girls go to the pool together, with Wakaba borrowing a swimsuit from Moeko. Afterwards, Wakaba laments being unable to go to a summer festival due to her curfew, so the others come up with a plan.
7	"A Sniper, By Any Chance?" "Moshikashite Sunaipā" (もしかしてスナイパー)	August 14, 2015
The girls manage to convince Wakaba's mother to let Wakaba attend the festival with them, allowing them to enjoy the stalls and fireworks.
8	"Bang Bang Bang" "Dondokodokodoko" (ドンドコドコドコ)	August 21, 2015
Wakaba's class prepares a play for the upcoming culture festival while Nao sets her sights on the beauty pageant.
9	"Wakaba-chan Fever" "Wakaba-chan Fībā" (若葉ちゃんフィーバー)	August 28, 2015
Nao catches a fever on the day of the culture festival, so Wakaba takes her place in the beauty pageant, managing to win first place.
10	"That's Impossible" "Sore wa Muri desu wa" (それは無理ですわ)	September 4, 2015
Moeko attempts to overcome her struggles with sports by trying to perform a back hip circle on a bar.
11	"A Machine for Generating Lazy People" "Daraku Ningen Seizō Kikai" (堕落人間製造機械)	September 11, 2015
The girls have a sleepover at Moeko's place during New Year's so Wakaba can have her first shrine visit with her friends.
12	"Stop With Those Eyes" "Sono Me o Yamero" (その目をやめろ)	September 18, 2015
Wakaba enjoys her first snowfall by participating in a snowball fight with the others, though ends up catching a cold in the process.
13	"Regular Girl" "Futsū no Onnanoko" (普通の女の子)	September 25, 2015
Wakaba worries that she might be moving abroad with her family, so the others try and convince them to stay, soon learning it was just a misunderstanding on Wakaba's part.
14 (OVA)	"I Want To Go to the Hot Springs" "Onsen Tsukaritai" (温泉つかりたい)	October 23, 2015
Wanting to go to a hot spring inn, the girls get a part-time job at a family restaurant run by Wakaba's older sister.

== See also ==
- Kin-iro Mosaic, another manga series by Yui Hara
- Majo wa Mangetsu ni Saku, another manga series by Yui Hara
