= Tesagure! Bukatsu-mono =

Japanese anime television series

- Cover of the first Blu-Ray Disc

てさぐれ！部活もの
- Genre: Slice of life
- Created by: Kōtarō Ishidate
- Anime television series
- Directed by: Kōtarō Ishidate
- Written by: Kōtarō Ishidate
- Music by: Junichi Inoue
- Studio: Yaoyorozu
- Original network: NTV
- Original run: October 5, 2013 – December 29, 2013
- Episodes: 12
- Manga
- Illustrated by: Kotora Suzune
- Published by: Takeshobo
- Magazine: Manga Life Win
- Original run: October 30, 2013 – December 20, 2013
- Anime television series

Tesagure! Bukatsu-mono Encore
- Directed by: Kōtarō Ishidate
- Written by: Kōtarō Ishidate
- Music by: Junichi Inoue
- Studio: Yaoyorozu
- Original network: NTV
- Original run: January 12, 2014 – March 29, 2014
- Episodes: 12
- Anime television series

Tesagure! Bukatsumono Spin-off Purupurun Sharumu to Asobou
- Directed by: Kōtarō Ishidate
- Written by: Kōtarō Ishidate
- Music by: Junichi Inoue
- Studio: Yaoyorozu
- Original network: Nippon TV
- Original run: April 5, 2015 – June 28, 2015
- Episodes: 12

Tesagure! Bukatsu-mono (てさぐれ！部活もの) is a Japanese anime television series. The series is animated using the program MikuMikuDance. The series began airing on Nippon Television in October 2013. A second season titled Tesagure! Bukatsu-mono Encore (てさぐれ!部活もの あんこーる) aired from January 12, 2014. A manga illustrated by Kotora Suzune is published online on Manga Life Win by Takeshobo. The third season is a collaboration with Ryū Jikō and Kidani L's manga Minarai Megami: Puru Purun Charm, which is published in Monthly Shōnen Sirius, and titled Tesagure! Bukatsumono Spin-off Purupurun Sharumu to Asobou (てさぐれ!部活もの すぴんおふ プルプルんシャルムと遊ぼう). Instead of each episode being 15 minutes as with the previous two seasons, the length of each episode is 30 minutes long to match the format of most TV anime.

== Plot ==
Koharu Tanaka joins an unusual club, in which the members brainstorm alternative club activities, drawing on common tropes from anime genres.

== Characters ==
=== Tesaguri club ===
Yua Suzuki (鈴木 結愛, Suzuki Yua)
Voiced by: Asuka Nishi
Third year student at Tousei High School. The club president, and wears a flower badge as a sign of this. Kikokushijo from Poland. Very strong enthusiasm and leadership skills.
Hina Satou (佐藤 陽菜, Satō Hina)
Voiced by: Satomi Akesaka
Third year student at Tousei High School. The club vice-president. Childhood friend of Yua. Wears a headband with a flower attached to it. Has a calm, intellectual personality. Nicknamed "Hīna" by other club members.
Aoi Takahashi (高橋 葵, Takashi Aoi)
Voiced by: Karin Ogino
Second year student at Tousei High School. Very direct and tends to badmouth, often using negative terms such as "annoying" when discussing other clubs.
Koharu Tanaka (田中 心春, Tanaka Koharu)
Voiced by: Ayaka Ōhashi
First year student at Tousei High School. Nicknamed "Koharun" by other club members. Wanting to join a club in high school but unable to decide which one to join, she was roped into the Tesaguri club because she "looked like a tsukkomi". Due to being raised by her grandmother, her tastes are a bit outdated.
Mio Watanabe (渡辺 美桜, Watanabe Mio)
Voiced by: Kaoru Mizuhara
The former club president. One year senior to Yua and Hina and previous president of the Tesaguri club. Introduced Aoi into the club. Largehearted and cares greatly for the other club members.
Appears in season two in the twelfth episode (with a brief glimpse in episode eight) and in season three in the fifth and twelfth episodes.

=== Other ===
Mobuko Sonota (園田 萌舞子, Sonota Mobuko)
Voiced by: Reina Ueda
Hazuki-sensei (葉月先生)
Voiced by: Reina Ueda
Fuefukitarō (笛吹太郎)
Voiced by: Kōtarō Ishidate

=== "Puru Purun Charm" characters ===
Rin Arisugawa (有栖川 凛, Arisugawa Rin)
Voiced by: Shiori Mikami
Kanon Izayoi (十六夜 花音, Izayoi Kanon)
Voiced by: Rumi Ōkubo
Hina Usami (宇佐美 陽菜, Usami Hina)
Voiced by: Mikako Komatsu
Enjoji Yui (円城寺 結衣, Yui Enjōji)
Voiced by: Natsumi Takamori
Okonogi Tomomi (小此木 友美, Tomomi Okonogi)
Voiced by: Sumire Uesaka

== Episode list ==
=== Season 1 ===
No.	Title	Original release date
1	"Welcome" "Kangei" (歓迎)	October 5, 2013
Koharu Tanaka is roped into an unusual club, in which the members brainstorm alternative club activities. The club comes up with some alternative activities related to baseball club.
2	"Pure love" "Junsui na aijō" (純粋な愛情)	October 12, 2013
3	"Inconstancy" "Utsurigi" (移り気)	October 19, 2013
4	"Dignity" "Igen" (威厳)	October 26, 2013
5	"Longing" "Akogare" (憧れ)	November 2, 2013
6	"Lonely love" "Samishii aijō" (淋しい愛情)	November 9, 2013
7	"Sincerity of the maiden" "Otome no magokoro" (乙女の真心)	November 16, 2013
8	"Love of ideal" "Risō no ai" (理想の愛)	November 23, 2013
9	"Shyness" "Uchiki" (内気)	November 30, 2013
10	"Egoism" "Egoizumu" (エゴイズム)	December 7, 2013
11	"Love fortune-telling" "Koi uranai" (恋占い)	December 13, 2013
12	"Heart of beauty" "Kokoro no bi" (心の美)	December 20, 2013

=== Tesagure! Bukatsu-mono Encore (Season 2) ===
No.	Title	Original release date
13	"We will never part" "Kesshite hanarenai" (決して離れない)	January 12, 2014
After a recap of season 1, Aoi and Koharu decide that this is the kind of anime where characters don't age (or graduate) and catch Yua and Hina for an "encore".
14	"Sincerity that withstood all trials" "Arayuru shiren ni taeta seijitsu" (あらゆる試練に耐えた誠実)	January 19, 2014
It has been one month since Koharu joined, or so the characters claim tongue-in-cheek. According to Yua, season 2 was decided on so suddenly they had to cut back on labor and she asks the others to stay as still as possible resulting in a mostly freeze frame episode. Discussion topic: basketball team.
15	"You are beautiful but cold" "Anata wa utsukushii ga reitan da" (あなたは美しいが冷淡だ)	January 26, 2014
This time the girls decide to recycle old footage and use rough sketches to reduce costs. Discussion topic: judo club.
16	"You cannot be fooled" "Anata wa itsuwarenai" (あなたは偽れない)	February 2, 2014
This episode's animation might be finished just in time, but the characters agree on avoiding extravagant movements to play it safe. Discussion topic: art club.
17	"I only stare at you" "Watashi wa anata dake o mitsumeru" (私はあなただけを見つめる)	February 9, 2014
Discussion topic: volleyball team.
18	"I like you when you are sad" "Kanashindeiru toki no anata ga suki" (悲しんでいるときのあなたが好き)	February 16, 2014
Discussion topic: broadcasting club.
19	"Aesthetic harmony" "Bi-teki chōwa" (美的調和)	February 23, 2014
Discussion topic: rugby club.
20	"Perfect charm" "Kanpeki na miryoku" (完璧な魅力)	March 2, 2014
The Tesaguri club performs a comedy act and a song at the school festival. Discussion topic: school festivals.
21	"Suspicion" "Saigishin" (猜疑心)	March 9, 2014
Discussion topic: quiz bowl club.
22	"Conceit" "Unubore" (うぬぼれ)	March 16, 2014
Discussion topics: riddles, athletic festivals.
23	"Hidden love" "Himeta ai" (秘めた愛)	March 23, 2014
Discussion topics: kendo club, rakugo society.
24	"A graceful woman" "Yūbi na josei" (優美な女性)	March 29, 2014
Most of the episode covers the year when Aoi was recruited and Mio was club president. Discussion topic: amusement parks. Then, Aoi and Koharu discuss if time should proceed normally this time with Yua and Hina graduating.

=== Tesagure! Bukatsumono Spin-off Purupurun Sharumu to Asobou (Season 3) ===
No.	Title	Original release date
25	"Let's play with female-shaped fighting robots and one-frame manga" "Josei-gata sentō robo to hito-koma manga de asobou" (女性型戦闘ロボとひとコマ漫画で遊ぼう)	April 5, 2015
Again, Yua and Hina are not allowed to graduate for good and the four girls decide this season is a dream and a spin-off, so they can get away with anything, and a collaboration with five characters from another work (Minarai Megami: Puru Purun Charm comedy manga) that doesn't have an anime adaptation yet, in a 30 minute time slot. First, they discuss how to reconcile schedules of nine voice actresses and issues with merging the two settings. The Charm girls discuss female-type battle robots and the Tesagure girls a one-frame slice-of-life manga.
26	"Let's play with the gymnastics club and musicals" "Taisō-bu to myūjikaru de asobou" (体操部とミュージカルで遊ぼう)	April 12, 2015
The Charm girls discuss gymnastics clubs and the Tesagure girls present highlights from season 1 and 2 musical-style.
27	"Let's play with interviews and table tennis" "Mensetsu to takkyū-bu de asobou" (面接と卓球部で遊ぼう)	April 19, 2015
The girls discuss their strong points, job interviews and table tennis clubs.
28	"Let's play with villas and school songs" "Bessō to kōka de asobou" (別荘と校歌で遊ぼう)	April 26, 2015
Yua and the Charm girls discuss new country villas, the Tesagure girls discuss and perform a new school song.
29	"Let's play with school trips and haunted houses" "Ensoku to o-bakeyashiki de asobou" (遠足とお化け屋敷で遊ぼう)	May 3, 2015
Mio, Hina and the Charm girls discuss school trips, then the Tesagure girls discuss haunted houses with the voice actresses recorded on location in a haunted house attraction.
30	"Let's play with dentists and Ferris wheels" "Haisha to kanransha de asobou" (歯医者と観覧車で遊ぼう)	May 10, 2015
Shuffling of discussion group members continues and the Tesagure voice actresses are recorded taking a ride on a ferris wheel.
31	"Let's play with werewolves and yuri (1)" "Jinrō to yuri de asobou ①" (人狼と百合で遊ぼう①)	May 17, 2015
All the voice actresses are together for recording. Based on the Werewolf party game, there are two "yuriwolves" among them and they must find out who they are before falling prey to them.
32	"Let's play with werewolves and yuri (2)" "Jinrō to yuri de asobou ②" (人狼と百合で遊ぼう②)	May 24, 2015
The game continues with a surprise as two girls claim to be the fortune-teller.
33	"Let's play with theaters and zoos" "Eigakan to dōbutsuen de asobou" (映画館と動物園で遊ぼう)	May 31, 2015
Discussion topics: movie theaters, zoos.
34	"Let's play with beauty salons and senryū" "Miyōin to senryū de asobou" (美容院と川柳で遊ぼう)	June 7, 2015
The girls discuss beauty salons and play a card game creating senryū.
35	"Let's play with previous videos from up to this point" "Ima made no eizō de asobou" (今までの映像で遊ぼう)	June 14, 2015
As the voice actresses can't match up their schedules and the animation production team is over-worked, they decide to play a game, "nuance dubbing theater", re-dubbing previous footage from season 3.
36	"Let's play with the MAJI Tesaguri Grand Prix" "MAJI tesaguri guran puri de asobou" (MAJIてさぐりグランプリで遊ぼう)	June 21, 2015
The girls have a comic dialog face-off to determine the main character of season 3.
