= Bladedance of Elementalers =

Japanese light novel series

- Cover of Blade dance of Elementalers volume 1.

精霊使いの剣舞 (Seirei Tsukai no Bureidodansu)
- Genre: Action, comedy, harem
- Light novel
- Written by: Yū Shimizu
- Illustrated by: Hanpen Sakura (1–13); Yuuji Nimura (14–16); Kohada Shimesaba (17–20)
- Published by: Media Factory
- Imprint: MF Bunko J
- Original run: December 24, 2010 – March 25, 2019
- Volumes: 20 + 1 extra
- Manga
- Written by: Yū Shimizu
- Illustrated by: Hyōju Issei
- Published by: Media Factory
- English publisher: NA: Digital Manga
- Magazine: Monthly Comic Alive
- Original run: June 27, 2012 – January 27, 2017
- Volumes: 6
- Anime television series
- Directed by: Tetsuya Yanagisawa
- Produced by: Maki Fujii
- Written by: Takao Yoshioka
- Music by: Yasuyoshi Susuki
- Studio: TNK
- Licensed by: AUS: Madman Entertainment; NA: Sentai Filmworks; UK: Animatsu Entertainment
- Original network: AT-X, Tokyo MX, MBS, TVA, BS11
- English network: NA: Anime Network; SEA: Animax Asia
- Original run: July 14, 2014 – September 29, 2014
- Episodes: 12 + 6 specials
- icon

Bladedance of Elementalers (Japanese: 精霊使いの剣舞(ブレイドダンス), Hepburn: Seirei Tsukai no Bureidodansu; lit. Spirit Elementalist's Blade Dance), also written as Blade Dance of Elementalers, is a Japanese light novel series written by Yū Shimizu with illustrations by Hanpen Sakura (volumes 1–13), Yuuji Nimura (volumes 14–16) and Kohada Shimesaba (volumes 17–20). A manga adaptation illustrated by Hyōju Issei was serialized from June 27, 2012, to January 27, 2017, in Media Factory's Monthly Comic Alive and compiled in six volumes. The first volume was released on February 23, 2013. An anime television series adaptation by TNK aired from July 14 to September 29, 2014. The last volume of the novel was released on March 25, 2019.

== Plot ==
The story takes place in a world where spirits exist and only pure maidens have the privilege of contracting with the spirits. These maidens hail from noble families and gather at the Areishia Spirit Academy, a specialized school where they are trained to become elementalists.

However, a male teenager named Kamito Kazehaya changes everything. After receiving an invitation from the Academy's director, Greyworth Ciel Mais to come to Areisha Spirit Academy, he loses his way in the spirit forest and stumbles upon a girl named Claire Rouge purifying herself in a lake. She is, understandably, upset and embarrassed and attacks him. He is able to avoid the worst of her wrath and finds out that she intends to contract with a sealed sword spirit. He accompanies her so that she can guide him out of the forest once she has accomplished her goal. Claire attempts to contract with the sealed sword spirit but fails causing it to go berserk. In order to save her life and much to Claire's chagrin, Kamito forms a contract with the sword spirit himself, turning him into the only male elementalist in the world (he also becomes the second male elementalist in 1000 years). Disregarding the fact that he saved her life, she accuses him of stealing her spirit and insists that he atone for it by becoming her contracted spirit.

== Characters ==
=== Team Scarlet ===
Kamito Kazehaya (カゼハヤ・カミト, Kazehaya Kamito)
Voiced by: Makoto Furukawa
The world's only known male elementalist. He forms an incomplete contract with the sealed sword spirit, Est, while responding to a summon from the director of Areishia Spirit Academy.
Before being summoned to the Academy he was raised as an elite assassin by the Institutional School where he was conditioned to become an emotionless shell in order to make him a more controllable (and disposable) tool. However, his life changed after meeting the spirit, Restia. She taught him about the world outside of the school, and, in the process, rekindled his emotions. The Institutional School was attacked and destroyed by a rampant fire spirit which allowed him to escape, along with the sealed artifact, a special ring that belonged to the first "Demon King", imprisoning Restia. An encounter with Greyworth, further changed his life.

Three years before, Kamito participated in the Blade Dance in drag under the name Ren Ashbell (レン・アッシュベル, Ren Asshuberu) and won the title of the Strongest Blade Dancer. He had long hair at the time, and an outfit (for girls) from what is believed to be his homeland as his disguise. Since Ren Ashbell is such a prominent role model to many of the maidens at the Academy, Kamito tries to avoid using his better-known techniques to avoid revealing that everyone's favorite idol is really a boy, usually unsuccessfully. His attempts at subterfuge are aided by the fact that, as Ren, he wielded Restia (a black sword) with his left hand (now covered with a glove), and he now wields Est (a white sword) with his right hand.
Kamito's life at the Academy is rather taxing because of The girls' feelings for him, coupled with wildly exaggerated rumors and misconceptions about him. The result of these hijinks is that Kamito becomes known as the 'Demon King of the Night' (and eventually daylight and noon). The irony of the situation is that if Kamito had actually done even a fraction of the perverted stuff he is rumored to, neither he or the girls he 'soiled' would be pure enough to use their contracted Spirits. Despite this inconsistency, the rumors about him are considered fact by numerous Intelligence agencies including the Duchy of Dracunia who first wanted to castrate him to protect innocent maidens, and then later changed their minds to wanting to seduce him, with the hope that the resulting children would inherit his abilities.

Claire Rouge (クレア・ルージュ, Kurea Rūju)
Voiced by: Ibuki Kido
Claire is the younger daughter of Duke Elstein. She inherited the Elstein fire-red hair and eyes as well as the family aptitude for Fire magic. The Elsteins were grand nobles who had served the royal family for generations ever since the founding of the Ordesian Empire. Four years ago her elder sister, Rubia, the Queen serving under the Fire Elemental Lord, snatched the strongest flame spirit, Laevateinn, and disappeared. Outraged by this betrayal, the Fire Elemental Lord burned parts of the Empire and would not allow any fires other than those of Flame Spirits to exist within the Empire. Ren Ashbell's Blade Dance the following year appeased the Fire Lord's anger enough that he stopped randomly burning the Empire. As the result of that incident, the Elstein duchy and fortune were seized and the duke and his wife were imprisoned in Balsas's prison. Although Claire was not sent to prison, the Imperial family demanded the return of Scarlet, her elemental spirit. However, Greyworth interceded on her behalf, saying that Claire would become an excellent elementalist at her Academy.
After Claire accepted Greyworth's offer, she dropped the Elstein family name and attends Areishia Spirit Academy under the alias Claire Rouge. Initially a meek and shy child Claire has strengthened herself in order to win the Blade Dance and find out the reasons for her sister's actions. Due to being ostracized as the sister of the "Calamity Queen", she has little trust in anybody other than Scarlet. Claire has studied intensely to become one of the top students of the school and become an able strategist. Her contract symbol with Scarlet is on the back of her right hand and looks like a white/red whirling mass of flames.

Although she treats Kamito as her 'slave spirit' as punishment for contracting Est in her place, she seems to enjoy books where the male character enslaves the female protagonist and even has dreams of being Kamito's slave. Like many other maidens, she was inspired by Ren Ashbell's Blade Dance three years ago. She has suspicions of Kamito being Ren Ashbell after observing him fight using the same moves as Ren and seeing him cross-dress during the current Blade Dance.
Ellis Fahrengart (エリス・ファーレンガルト, Erisu Fārengaruto)
Voiced by: Shizuka Ishigami
A daughter of Duke Fahrengart who's the head of the militant Fahrengart family. She has contracted with Simurgh, a wind spirit who appears as a large hawk with a waffe form of a spear. Her contract symbol is on the back of her right hand and resembles the view of a tornado seen from directly above in white/green. The Duke Fahrengart is Ellis' father, who wants her to marry Kamito and raise kids. Ellis also has a two years-elder adopted sister, Velsaria Eva Fahrengart.
Ellis is also the captain of the Sylphid Knights; a group of students, who help protect the Academy, enforce discipline and morals, handle wild spirits and the recently opened Astral Gates in the forest. Although initially vehemently against Kamito's presence at the Academy (as the only other known male elementalist was the demon king) she gradually warms up to and falls in love with him. Ellis has a strict and firm personality, but has the heart of an innocent maiden which her close friends and comrades in the Sylphid Knights take advantage of;– she was once tricked her into believing a risqué outfit was the new dress uniform. It's unknown if she had a specific wish for the Blade Dance, although she may have entered to save her sister Velsaria as well as to bring honor to her family and country.

After seeing Kamito fight numerous times she is suspicious of how similar his fighting style is to Ren Ashbell's, but is fooled by an article listing Ashbell's believed "preferences" which are different from his due to him giving vague yes/no answers back then to cover his voice cracking. In Volume 13, she gets a big boost to her divine power and recovery ability after kissing Kamito on the lips. The boost was powerful enough to heal several days' worth of injuries in one day and enlarged Sigmurgh enough to enable him to carry two people instead of just one.
Rinslet Laurenfrost (リンスレット・ローレンフロスト, Rinsuretto Rōrenfurosuto)
Voiced by: Kana Yūki
She is one of the daughters of the Laurenfrost family. While a prominent family it was slightly lesser to that of the Elsteins before their fall. Rinslet's personality is that of a showoff that enjoys the spotlight chance permitting, but not at the expense of doing her duty. Despite that is still a shy girl who hides her concern for others and unlike many never treated Claire any differently from when they were friends to Rubia becoming the Calamity Queen. She was chosen by the Laurenfrost guardian spirit Fenrir to be his contractor. Due to being contracted with him she is very skilled in Ice magic and an accomplished sniper with his Waffe form of a bow. Like the others has the heart of an innocent maiden who falls deeply for Kamito. Also like the others this does not stop her from striking hard with magic (and holding him completely at fault) if she catches him in an embarrassing situation with another girl. She is an expert in domestic matter due to her maid Carol being completely lacking in skills of being a Laurenfrost maid except for being cute (and able to trick Rinslet easily).
Rinslet enters the Blade Dance with the wish for the Water Lord to forgive her sister Judia and break the eternal ice curse cast upon her for what was thought to be a mistake during a kagura dance to the Water Lord. Similar to Ellis she gets a boost to her divine power after kissing Kamito in Volume 13. Position in team is that of Sniper/Support as her Ice Magic and Bow attacks are best suited for mid/long range battle while extremely disadvantageous at close melee range. Contract symbol is on back of her right hand and resembles a white/blue complex snowflake with two sides cropped off by the edge of the symbol. While trying to save a spirit after the Blade Dance she gets another contract symbol on the back of her left hand that looks like a white/blue ice rose.

Fianna Ray Ordesia (フィアナ・レイ・オルデシア, Fiana Rei Orudeshia)
Voiced by: Saori Ōnishi
She is the second princess of the Ordesian Empire and the chosen contractor of the family guardian spirit, Georgios. Her contract symbol is white/gold in color and located just above her cleavage. It is discovered later that she was using pads and the family bloodstone she stole to appear bigger. Fianna has a playful personality with a risque sense of humour that earned her the nickname Perverted Princess. She is aware that Kamito is Ren Ashbell due to him having saved her from a rogue spirit while wielding Restia three years previously. She demanded his true name and made a promise to meet him again. When she enrolls in the Academy, Greyworth asks Kamito's team to act as Fianna's bodyguard and Kamito does not recognize her at first due to trauma and Restia's magic clouding his memories around the time of his wish.
Fianna was raised as a typical potential Queen candidate maiden being trained in seclusion but she has been unable to summon Georgios since Rubia used the just stolen Levateinn to take out Georgios in one strike. As a result she was ostracized as the "Lost Queen", practically disowned, and treated harshly by not only her family, but the family servants and other nobles as well. Especially in regards to her two year-older brother, Arneus Ray Ordesia, who she considers cruel and unfit to be the next emperor as well as anyone getting what they deserve if they crown him. As with many other girls of her generation, seeing Ren Ashbell's Blade Dance three years ago gave her the strength to go on. Greyworth and a few other teachers are aware that she 'cheated' on her entrance exam by using flash stones (magic stones containing a spirit anyone can use but is expensive and one use only) and that she is unable to function as an elementalist, but the headmistress allowed her to enroll regardless, hoping that she will be able to regain her abilities.

Fianna joins Team Scarlet, and with the support of Kamito and the others, is able to summon Georgios again. Her purpose in entering the Blade Dance is to regain her ability as an elementalist. Due to lack of combat training, she is unable to enter direct combat except for summoning and sending Georgios. After learning how to summon a waffe she is also able to cast the spell known as "Save the Queen" which establishes an area around where the waffe has been stabbed into the ground as her territory which shields those inside from enemy attacks as well as heal wounds and replenish divine power through the Holy Attribute. She acts as the team's healer but she has to be in skin contact with Kamito to heal him due to his resistance to Holy magic, which she does quite willingly and forwardly. While she cherishes the friends who did not abandon her, she wishes to remain with Team Scarlet as they fully accepted her, even after discovering she was initially faking being an elementalist (especially as she is very much in love with Kamito.)

=== Spirits ===
Terminus Est (テルミヌス・エスト, Teruminusu Esuto)
Voiced by: Ai Kakuma
Est is Kamito's second contracted spirit. Due to his guilt (for making another spirit contract) and refusal to abandon Restia, the contract was only partially completed so she can only manifest 10% of her power. Therefore, unlike other spirits, she can't return to Astral Zero to recharge and so spends a large amount of time sleeping in sword form to recover her strength. This also means Kamito can't summon her with the Spirit Seal on his hand as summoning only works if the spirit is in Astral Zero. She has long, white hair, blue eyes, and in human form looks to be about 12-13 years old. She is usually stoic (speaking softly in a monotone), but she likes to be praised and having Kamito pat her on the head. Est is especially jealous of Restia. In an effort to "please" Kamito she has read some of Claire's X-rated books and wears unusual costumes from Fianna's collection to bid him good morning. For some reason Est has no problem appearing naked as long as her legs are covered, usually with knee socks.
In the past, she was contracted to Areishia Idriss, the Sacred Queen who defeated the Demon King, but her unique ability which destroys curses unfortunately builds up her own curse until it activates turning her wielder into Spirit Crystal. This is because she is not a true Holy Sword but rather a Demonic Sword. After years of daily fighting, her curse finally took its toll and, to her horror, Est witnessed Areishia turn into crystal right in front of her. Afterwards that she sealed herself in the Demon King's armory and refused to make a contract with anyone to prevent the same thing from happening again. After her memory was restored, not wanting to curse Kamito too, she sealed herself away again but he refused saying that he would accept her curse and destiny even if it would one day lead to his own destruction.

Restia Ashdoll (レスティア・アッシュドール, Resutia Asshudōru)
Voiced by: Yōko Hikasa
Kamito's first contracted spirit. She was sealed in the ring of Sulaimon and taught Kamito everything including about the world beyond the Institutional School, and giving him emotions as well as forming a Spirit Contract with him without permission. After the Institutional School was destroyed Kamito took the ring and searched for a way to release her, eventually leading him to Greyworth who took an interest in him and helped him to release her from the ring. Afterwards she and Kamito took part in the Bladedance becoming the Strongest Bladedancer and making a forbidden wish which corrupted her and made her disappear. It's later revealed that she was one of the 72 pillars of the first Demon King and that her job is to find, select, and raise a potential candidate as the next Demon King if she feels that person is worthy of inheriting the title. Kamito is the first potential candidate she has come into contact with who was not overwhelmed by the Demon King's power within them. Her personality is that of a mischievous, caring young woman fond of pranks but can be deadly serious when the situation calls for it. Like Est she cares very deeply for Kamito and is jealous that Est is also Kamito's contracted spirit. Restia's contract circle isn't described but is located on Kamito's left hand which he usually covers with a leather glove. As no two Spirit Contract symbols are alike this could expose his identity as Ren Ashbell whose Spirit Contract symbol is as well known as Ashbell is.
Her elemental waffe is The Sword That Pierces Truth Vorpal Sword that looks like a black greatsword with a red edge. Her special power as a sword is releasing powerful black/purple lightning that destroys almost everything it touches. In human form she can disappear into shadows and shoot all the feathers from her wings like darts, although using the latter prevents her from being able to fly until her wings recover. To ensure that she doesn't become the "Enemy of the World" she told Kamito to kill her if she became someone other than herself.

Scarlet/Ortlinde (スカーレット/オルトリンデ, Sukāretto/Orutorinde)
Voiced by: Ibuki Kido
Scarlet is Claire's female contracted spirit that had been passed down the Elstein family contracting only with those of her choosing. Scarlet usually takes the form of a flaming red house cat or, when in waffe form, that of a whip with Fire attributes. It is later revealed that Scarlet is in fact a powerful fire spirit able to take human form, but that her true name, Ortlinde, was forgotten. Ortlinde, also known as the Scarlet Valkyrie, appears as a young cat girl garbed in flames who wields a flame scythe and is able to conjure fireballs which are immensely more powerful than Claire's. Due to her isolation as Rubia's younger sister, Claire developed a habit of keeping Scarlet around for companionship. Scarlet is fond of Kamito because he feeds her and Ortlinde considers him to be Claire's master because of Claire's dreams involving him.
Fenrir (フェンリル, Fenriru)
Fenrir is an Ice attribute spirit, contracted with Rinslet Laurenfrost, who takes the form of a white/silver Wolf with blue eyes. Fenrir is large enough to be ridden by Rinslet. His waffe form is that of a silvery bow that shoots ice arrows. In addition to Ice Magic, Fenrir can also 'suck' up items that are carried in some kind of pocket dimension (Hammerspace) that can be 'spat' out later depending on which items are wanted.
Simurgh (シムルグ, Shimurugu)
Simurgh is Ellis' contracted Wind spirit who takes the form of a large hawk or, in his waffe form, that of a spear. Being a Wind spirit, Simurgh is able to act independently at greater distances than other contracted spirits.
Georgios (ゲオルギウス, Georugiusu)
Georgios is Fianna's contracted Holy Spirit who takes the form of a glowing knight in full plate armor wielding a sword and shield. Georgios' waffe form is that of a ceremonial rapier. As a Holy Spirit he has extreme resistance and can inflict severe damage to Darkness Spirits. Georgios was overwhelmed by Rubia when Fianna tried to stop Rubia's betrayal, and as a result Fianna became unable to summon him until, three years later, she was able to regain the inner strength she needed thanks to Kamito. Unlike Claire and Rinslet, Fianna doesn't summon Georgios for companionship but only when he is needed.

=== Ordesian Empire ===
==== Areishia Spirit Academy ====
Greyworth Ciel Mais (グレイワース・シェルマイス, Gureiwāsu Sherumaisu)
Voiced by: Mai Nakahara
Greyworth is the principal and director of the Areishia Spirit Academy and a former member of the Ordesia Empire's Numbers, an organization of elites. She is also known as the "Dusk Witch". She has the appearance of a beautiful woman in her early twenties with ash-blonde hair and gray eyes. She won the Blade Dance 24 years prior to the beginning of the story with her demon spirit, Void. She wished for immortality and youth. She met Kamito soon after he escaped the destruction of the Instructional School when he was contracted to kill her. She took him in and trained him in the sword techniques that allowed him to win the Blade Dance the following year. In the present, she summons Kamito to Areishia Spirit Academy where she enrolls him as a transfer and forces him to participate in the current Blade Dance.
Freya Grandol (フレイヤ・グランドル, Fureiya Gurandoru)
Voiced by: Yumi Kakazu
Freya is a teacher at Areishia Spirit Academy. She is Raven Class's homeroom lecturer and a shadow spirit elementalist. She is also the manager of the academy's Astral Gate. She appears to be in her mid-twenties and has long black hair. She uses her ability to travel between shadows to gather information for Greyworth. As a member of the Spirit Research Agency Freya has traveled and performed field work across the continent.

=== Instructional School ===
The Instructional School was a secret academy run by powerful but unknown people from the Empire for the express purpose of training children to become emotionless assassins. The children raised at the Instructional School were usually orphans, abandoned for various reasons or kidnapped. The school was destroyed by an extremely powerful fire spirit and those children who were not killed or did not escape on their own were taken into the care of the Ordesian Empire.
Muir Alenstarl (ミュア・アレンスタール, Myua Arensutāru)
Muir was the second most powerful assassin at the Instructional School after Kamito. She was born in a small village on the border of the Empire. Even though she was not of noble blood, she was found to possess the ability to contract with spirits and for this she was treasured. On her fourth birthday she was presented to the village's guardian spirit in hopes that she would form a contract with it and so allow the village to prosper. Unknown to the villagers, Muir's ability could only cause spirits she encountered to go berserk. As a result, the guardian spirit ran amok and destroyed the village and itself in the process. Vilified, Muir was abandoned and picked up by the Instructional School, where she was taught nothing but slaughter techniques, given the Cursed Armament Seal called "Jester's Vice", which allowed her some measure of control over the spirits she encountered, and became known as a Monster. She has a child-like personality and likes to do things as the whim takes her without regards for anyone else. Since she was born with a power which the world rejects, she has chosen to reject the world in turn and is merciless against those who oppose her will, with the exception of Kamito, whom she refers to as Onii-sama. In fact, one might call Muir obsessed with Kamito who tried to befriend her when she arrived at the Instructional School, but when she refused friendship offered to think of her as a younger sister.
Lily Flame (リリィ・フレイム, Riryi Fureimu)
Lily is an Elfim assassin with jade-green hair, red eyes and pointy ears. She was ranked as the sixth strongest at Instructional School and worked closely with Muir and Kamito, where she was in charge of information gathering. Lily has contracted with Titania, a plant spirit with many different types of poisons and chemicals to wear down its opponents that have been touched by its spines. :Following the destruction of the Instructional School, Lily was found by Rubia Elstein and swore loyalty to her because not only did Rubia value her abilities, but she treated Lily as a person worthy of respect rather than a disposable tool. Two years later, she was reunited with Muir and later became a member of Team Inferno.
Jio Inzagi (ジオ・インザーギ, Jio Inzāgi)
Voiced by: Yoshitsugu Matsuoka
Jio was an orphan who was raised at the Instructional School. He has a hard, steel-like reddish hair (black in the light novel) and red eyes with dark skin. Although he went through the same training as Kamito, his abilities were inferior (he was outclassed by both Muir and Kamito) and he did not have the ability to communicate and form a contract with spirits. Jio has a haughty and arrogant personality that considers spirits to be disposable tools to be used up and discarded like trash. Only keeps his promises or word when he feels like it, and ready to break them and abandon anyone at his earliest convenience while saying it's not his fault that they were foolish enough to trust him.
After the destruction of the Instructional School, Jio was found to have the ability to maintain numerous Spirit Seals within his body (in the form of tattoos) and command them through use of a blood stone. (Most people would have trouble with just a few Seals without getting drained.) He is extremely jealous of Kamito's position as the next demon king and tries to defeat Kamito using various tricks to make it seem that he's doing so with the Demon King's power to prove 'he' is the rightful successor and not the cheap imitation he really is. After his defeat, Jio is sent to Balsas Prison.

=== Laurenfrost House ===
Judia Laurenfrost (ユーディア・ローレンフロスト, Yūdia Rōrenfurosuto)
She is the second daughter of Gryus Laurenfrost. Rinslet's younger sister. She took Rinslet's place to do a dance honoring the Water Elemental Lord Iseria Seaward, but made a mistake resulting her being imprisoned in eternal ice for punishment. No Water Spirit users have been able to melt the ice, and no offerings have been enough to pardon Judia. Feeling guilty for letting Judia take her place in the dance, Rinslet wants to win the Blade Dance to wish Judia forgiven and freed.
Turns out Judia didn't make a mistake, but during her dance the Darkness driving the Elemental Lords mad noticed her and used the ritual to send a piece of itself into her to control her. Unable to stop it from corrupting Judia, Iseria froze her to stop keep her from summoning the rest of the Darkness into the human world. However, Kamito is able to use Est to free Judia from the Darkness, but what damage to her body and mind is unknown as she's still out cold at the end of Light Novel 13 and is resting in bed.

Mirelle Laurenfrost (ミレーユ・ローレンフロスト, Mirēyu Rōrenfurosuto)
Rinslet's youngest sister. Looks a lot like a younger Rinslet, but hasn't shown any signs of forming a Spirit Contract yet.
Carol Nastassha (キャロル・ナスターシャ, Kyaroru Nasutāsha)
Voiced by: Manami Tanaka
She is Rinslet Laurenfrost's personal maid. Although Carol is quite useless as a maid, she understands her master very well and she is always there to support Rinslet. Carol often relays her master's true feelings to Kamito when Rinslet is not being honest. She is adept at talking Rinslet into taking care of her and doing things she should be doing for Rinslet. While she hasn't shown any skills expected for a maid, she seems to be accepted as a Laurenfrost maid as their only criterion seems to be that a maid is cute.

== Media ==
=== Light novels ===
Bladedance of Elementalers is a light novel series written by Yū Shimizu with illustrations by Hanpen Sakura (volumes 1–14), Yuuji Nimura (14–16) and Kohada Shimesada (17–20). The first volume was published on December 24, 2010, under Media Factory's MF Bunko J, and the last on March 25, 2019. Twenty novels in the series and one extra have been released.

No.	Title	Release date	ISBN
1	Bladedance of Elementalers: The Sword, The Academy and The Hell Cat Girl (精霊使いの剣舞 剣と学院と火猫少女)	December 24, 2010	978-4-8401-3675-4
2	Bladedance of Elementalers 2: The Lost Queen (精霊使いの剣舞2 ロスト・クイーン)	February 25, 2011	978-4-8401-3824-6
3	Bladedance of Elementalers 3: Pledge of the Wind (精霊使いの剣舞3 風の誓約)	May 25, 2011	978-4-8401-3930-4
4	Bladedance of Elementalers 4: The Blade Dance (精霊使いの剣舞4 精霊剣舞祭)	August 25, 2011	978-4-8401-4202-1
5	Bladedance of Elementalers 5: Demon Slayer (精霊使いの剣舞5 魔王殺しの聖剣)	November 25, 2011	978-4-8401-4299-1
6	Bladedance of Elementalers 6: The Reminisced Darkness Spirit (精霊使いの剣舞6 追憶の闇精霊)	February 24, 2012	978-4-8401-4386-8
7	Bladedance of Elementalers 7: The Strongest Blade Dancer (精霊使いの剣舞7 最強の剣舞姫)	May 25, 2012	978-4-8401-4580-0
8	Bladedance of Elementalers 8: The Night Before the Finale (精霊使いの剣舞8 決戦前夜)	August 24, 2012	978-4-8401-4684-5
9	Bladedance of Elementalers 9: Cross Fire (精霊使いの剣舞9 クロス・ファイア)	November 22, 2012	978-4-8401-4874-0
10	Bladedance of Elementalers 10: The Awakening of the Demon King (精霊使いの剣舞10 魔王覚醒)	February 25, 2013	978-4-8401-4983-9
11	Bladedance of Elementalers 11: Elemental Lord Assassination (精霊使いの剣舞11 精霊王暗殺)	July 25, 2013	978-4-8401-5225-9
12	Bladedance of Elementalers 12: Releasing the Sealed Sword (精霊使いの剣舞12 封剣解放)	November 25, 2013	978-4-04-066075-2
13	Bladedance of Elementalers 13: Queen of Ice Blossoms (精霊使いの剣舞13 氷華の女王)	April 25, 2014	978-4-04-066383-8
14	Bladedance of Elementalers 14: Upheaveal at the Imperial Capital (精霊使いの剣舞14 帝都動乱)	July 24, 2015	978-4-04-066915-1
15	Bladedance of Elementalers 15: The Dragon King of Dracunia (精霊使いの剣舞15 ドラクニアの竜王)	February 25, 2016	978-4-04-068037-8
16	Bladedance of Elementalers 16: The Demon King Returns in Triumph (精霊使いの剣舞16 魔王凱旋)	February 25, 2017	978-4-04-068343-0
Ex	Bladedance of Elementalers: Elemental Festa (精霊使いの剣舞 精霊舞踏祭)	October 25, 2017	978-4-04-069345-3
17	Bladedance of Elementalers 17: The Queen of the Demon King City (精霊使いの剣舞17 魔王都市の女王)	February 24, 2018	978-4-04-069740-6
18	Bladedance of Elementalers 18: Retaking the Imperial Capital (精霊使いの剣舞18 帝都奪還)	May 25, 2018	978-4-04-069922-6
19	Bladedance of Elementalers 19: Holy City Annihilation (精霊使いの剣舞19 聖都消滅)	September 25, 2018	978-4-04-065094-4
20	Bladedance of Elementalers 20: The Holy Sword of Resonance (精霊使いの剣舞20 共鳴の聖魔剣)	March 25, 2019	978-4-04-065630-4

=== Manga ===
A manga adaptation illustrated by Hyōju Issei was serialized from June 27, 2012, to January 27, 2017, in Media Factory's Monthly Comic Alive and compiled in six volumes. The first volume was released on February 23, 2013 and the last on March 23, 2017. In May 2014, Digital Manga licensed the manga for release in North America, and released the first volume on October 27, 2015. They did not release others.

No.	Original release date	Original ISBN	English release date	English ISBN
1	February 23, 2013	978-4-04-066804-8	October 27, 2015	978-1-569-70340-3
2	August 23, 2013	978-4-04-066805-5	–	—
3	March 22, 2014	978-4-04-066502-3	–	—
4	November 22, 2014	978-4-04-066894-9	–	—
5	February 23, 2016	978-4-04-068250-1	–	—
6	March 23, 2017	978-4-04-069124-4	–	—

=== Anime ===
It was one of five MF Bunko J light novel anime adaptations announced at Media Factory's Summer School Festival event on July 28, 2013. An anime television series adaptation by TNK aired from July 14 to September 29, 2014. The opening theme is "Kyoumei no True Force" (共鳴のTrue Force, Sympathy's True Force) performed by Hitomi Harada and the ending theme song is "Blade Dance" (精霊剣舞祭（ブレイドダンス）, Bureido Dansu) performed by Knee-Socks. Each BD release included a short special episode. Crunchyroll streamed the series, while Sentai Filmworks have licensed the series.

No.	Title	Original release date
1	"The Sword, the School, and the Fire Cat-Girl"; Transliteration: "Ken to Gakuin to Hineko Shōjo" (Japanese: 剣と学院と火猫少女)	July 14, 2014
Areishia Spirit Academy: a place where young girls train to become elementalers, where no men are allowed. Kazehaya Kamito gets lost trying to head to the school, and runs into Claire Rouge, a girl purifying herself for a spirit contracting ceremony. She tries to contract with the Demon Slayer, a sword that no one had succeeded in contacting with before, but it goes out of control...
2	"Blade Dance at Midnight"; Transliteration: "Mayonaka no Bureido Dansu" (Japanese: 真夜中の剣舞(ブレイドダンス))	July 21, 2014
Kamito is the only guy in at Areishia Spirit Academy, where no men are supposed to be allowed. He ends up getting a house next to the stable, when Rinslet comes to see him. She offers him some soup, in exchange for him to become her servant. Claire shows up at the same time with some canned food. The two begin fighting over Kamito.
3	"The Holy Sword that Killed the Demon Lord"; Transliteration: "Maō-Goroshi no Seiken" (Japanese: 魔王殺しの聖剣)	July 28, 2014
At the end of the battle with Sylphid knights, commanded by Ellis, a demon spirit appears. Claire desires a strong spirit and attempts to contract with it, and confronts it by herself. She ultimately proves no match to it, and Kamito uses the sword spirit to try to rescue her.
4	"The Strongest Blade Dancer"; Transliteration: "Saikyō no Bureido Dansā" (Japanese: 最強の剣舞姫(ブレイドダンサー))	August 4, 2014
There's a contracting ceremony this afternoon in which Claire's involved. Claire wants to gain power by obtaining spirits, but she might be in more than she bargained for when she enters a blade dance. Kamito comes to her aid, but is he too late?
5	"Lost Queen"; Transliteration: "Rosuto Kuīn" (Japanese: 口ストクイーン)	August 11, 2014
Everyone wants Kamito to join their team, but his allegiance lies with Claire. Meanwhile, a girl of noble order transfers to their school and Kamito is asked to protect her. And some of Kamito's mysterious past is revealed.
6	"The Demon Lord's Successor"; Transliteration: "Maō no Kōkeisha" (Japanese: 魔王の後継者)	August 18, 2014
Princess Fianna just got to Areishia Spirit Academy and she's already causing problems. For one, she challenges Claire Rouge to a duel. And the duel is one that Claire doesn't expect. To add to the chaos, a mysterious boy shows up on campus.
7	"Battle of the Mining City"; Transliteration: "Kōzan Toshi no Tatakai" (Japanese: 鉱山都市の戦い)	August 25, 2014
Rinslet, Claire, Est, and Fianna fight for affection and time with Kamito as they all set on a new mission, only to find Ellis Fahrengart and the rest of the Ordesia order girls fighting what could very well be the true successor to the Demon Lord.
8	"Team Scarlet"; Transliteration: "Chīmu Sukāretto" (Japanese: チーム・スカーレット)	September 1, 2014
The madness has worked its way to a fever pitch as Kamito and the ladies come to a battle – which includes bloodstones and an altar - that is much bigger than they could've ever imagined. Meanwhile, Fianna reveals a big and bold secret to the team.
9	"Covenant of the Wind"; Transliteration: "Kaze no Seiyaku" (Japanese: 風の誓約)	September 8, 2014
As it's almost the Festival of Valentia and you’re supposed to give chocolate to your crush, we find the girls slaving away in the kitchen to impress Kamito. A lunch outing presents a strange new girl that could be up to something behind the scenes.
10	"Sylphid"; Transliteration: "Shirufīdo" (Japanese: 風王騎士団(シルフィード))	September 15, 2014
Ellis asks Kamito to join Sylphid Knight, the school's guard, and he reluctantly says yes in return for some compensation. Of course, when Claire finds out the news she's heartbroken – as these are the same girls that made fun of her and her sister.
11	"The Night of Valentia"; Transliteration: "Varentia no Yoru" (Japanese: ヴァレンティアの夜)	September 22, 2014
Ellis' sister is drunk with power as she practically blows up the entire town in her wake. Ellis, Rinslet, and Claire join forces as Team Scarlet just in time for the Blade Dance. And Kamito spends his team compensation on something special.
12	"Ren Ashbell"; Transliteration: "Ren Asshuberu" (Japanese: レン・アッシュベル)	September 29, 2014
Velsaria is confronted by Team Scarlet and each uses their strongest move that fails, then Kamito asks Est to take them to the team is at. As Kamito got there he fights Velsaria with the aid of his team, they notice he uses the same moves as Ren Ashbell. And manages to save Velsaria, later Greyworth found out what made Velsaria got that strange power.
OVA–1	"Imperial City Spirit Festival"; Transliteration: "Teito no Seirei Taisai" (Japanese: 帝都の精霊大祭)	October 8, 2014
The story is set four years ago, in which Kamito must recover Demon King's regalia in the kingdom during a festival.
OVA–2	"Est Nursing"; Transliteration: "Esuto, Kanbyō Suru" (Japanese: エスト、看病する)	November 5, 2014
Kamito is sick and Terminus Est, left behind, tries to nurse him back to health.
OVA–3	"The Princess's Secret Part-Time Job"; Transliteration: "Ohime-sama no Naisho no Arubaito" (Japanese: お姫様の内緒のアルバイト)	December 3, 2014
Kamito, Est, Claire and Fianna takes a part-time job in a maid cafe.
OVA–4	"Follow the Legendary Busty Spirit"; Transliteration: "Densetsu no Kyonyū Seirei o Oe" (Japanese: 伝説の巨乳精霊を追え)	January 7, 2015
Claire and Rinslet tries to search for the legendary bust spirit in a lake.
OVA–5	"Horror of Darkness Hot Pot Battle"; Transliteration: "Senritsu no Yaminabe Batoru" (Japanese: 戦慄の闇鍋バトル)	February 4, 2015
Team Scarlet tries to do a Spirit Summon by hotpot.
OVA–6	"Elementalists on Holiday"; Transliteration: "Seirei Tsukai no Kyūsoku" (Japanese: 精霊使いの休息)	March 4, 2015
Kamito gets a rest in a hot spring, but gets in hot water when the rest of the team walks in the spring.
