= Suzakinishi the Animation =

Television series

- Promotional image of the anime television series featuring the main characters.

洲崎西 THE ANIMATION
- Genre: Comedy, Slice of Life
- Anime television series
- Directed by: Yoshihiro Hiramine
- Written by: Yoshihiro Hiramine
- Music by: Yoshihiro Suda
- Studio: Feel
- Original network: Tokyo MX, SUN-TV, KTK
- Original run: July 8, 2015 – September 23, 2015
- Episodes: 12

Suzakinishi the Animation (洲崎西 THE ANIMATION), stylized as SUZAKINISHI THE ANIMATION or SuzakiNishi the Animation is a Japanese anime television series produced by Feel. The anime is based on Bunka Housou Chou A&G + internet radio program SuzakiNishi by Aya Suzaki and Asuka Nishi. Besides starring in the anime, both voice actresses also perform the anime theme song "Smile☆Revolution".

== Plot ==
Two transfer students arrive at a certain high school in Tokyo at the same time on the same day; airhead Aya Suzaki and happy-go-lucky Asuka Nishi. The story is about the two girls everyday fun school life.

== Characters ==
Aya Suzaki (洲崎 綾, Suzaki Aya)
Voiced by: Aya Suzaki
Asuka Nishi (西 明日香, Nishi Asuka)
Voiced by: Asuka Nishi
