= Garakowa: Restore the World =

- Poster

Japanese name
- Kanji: ガラスの花と壊す世界
Transcriptions
- Revised Hepburn: Glass no Hana to Kowasu Sekai
- Directed by: Masashi Ishihama
- Screenplay by: Fumihiko Shimo
- Story by: Physics Point (Note: Original Concept (原案); a creative duo consisting of Otono Shimura and Suyuri Hiraume.); Masashi Ishihama (Note: Story Supervisor (ストーリー監修))
- Based on: D.Backup by Physics Point
- Produced by: Ryōichi Ishihara
- Starring: Yumiri Hanamori; Risa Taneda; Ayane Sakura; Ai Kayano
- Cinematography: Kenji Takahashi
- Edited by: Kentarou Tsubone
- Music by: Masaru Yokoyama
- Production company: A-1 Pictures
- Distributed by: Pony Canyon
- Release date: January 9, 2016 (Japan)
- Running time: 66 minutes
- Country: Japan
- Language: Japanese
- Box office: $43,000

Garakowa: Restore the World, known in Japan as Vitreous Flower & Destroy the World (ガラスの花と壊す世界, Garasu no Hana to Kowasu Sekai; lit. 'The Glass Flower and The Destroyed World'), is a 2016 Japanese anime science fiction fantasy film produced by A-1 Pictures, directed by Masashi Ishihama and written by Fumihiko Shimo. Distributed by Pony Canyon, the film was released in Japan on January 9, 2016, and was streamed on Crunchyroll on January 16, 2016.

== Plot ==
Dual and Dorothy are two programs that reside within the Box of Wisdom. Their job is to enter the various worlds containing the memories of people across many timelines, deleting worlds that become infected with viruses. One day, they come across Remo, a girl who has lost memory of who she is, who is searching for something known as the flower garden. While trying to figure out who she is, Dual and Dorothy spend time with Remo, learning to find joy in various things that they'd normally deem pointless. However, they soon begin to learn not only about Remo's true purpose but also about the state of the world outside of their box.

== Characters ==
Remo/ Mother Remote (リモ, Rimo)
Voiced by: Yumiri Hanamori
Dual (デュアル, Duaru)
Voiced by: Risa Taneda
Dorothy (ドロシー, Doroshī)
Voiced by: Ayane Sakura
Sumire (スミレ)
Voiced by: Ai Kayano

== Reception ==
Theron Martin of Anime News Network gave the film an overall B rating, praising the film's outstanding background art and cuteness, but criticizing the story for not realizing the potential of its serious tones and being overall too condensed. Garakowa: Restore the World grossed $43,000 at the box office.
