= MikuMikuDance =

3D animation program for Windows

MikuMikuDance (MMD)
- A computer-generated model of Hatsune Miku (CV01) rendered in MikuMikuDance (MMD)
- Original author: HiguchiM
- Developer: HiguchiM
- Release: February 24, 2008; 18 years ago
- Stable release: 9.32 / December 10, 2019; 6 years ago
- Written in: C++
- Operating system: Microsoft Windows
- Available in: English, Japanese, Chinese, Spanish
- Type: Computer-generated imagery
- License: Freeware
- Website: sites.google.com/view/vpvp/

MikuMikuDance (commonly abbreviated to MMD) is a freeware animation program that allows users to create animated and still renders, originally produced for the Japanese Vocaloid Hatsune Miku, the first member of the Character Vocal series created by Crypton Future Media. The program was developed by Yu Higuchi (HiguchiM) and has gone through significant upgrades since its initial creation. Its production was made as part of the VOCALOID Promotion Video Project (VPVP).

== Overview ==
The software allows users to import computer-generated .pmd and .pmx models into a virtual space that can be moved and animated accordingly. The positioning of the computer-generated figures can be easily altered, as can the facial expressions (as long as the model has morphs to use), and motion data can be applied to the model to make it move. In addition, accessories, stages, and backgrounds can be added to create an environment, and effects such as shaders and filters can be applied using the MMEffect (MikuMikuEffect or MME) plugin. Sound and music can also be added via .WAV files to create music videos, short films, and fan-made stories. The motion data used to animate the characters and the pose data used for still-renders can be exported as .vmd (Vocaloid Motion Data) files and .vpd (Vocaloid Pose Data) files respectively. Camera data is also exported as motion data. The exported files can then be imported into other compatible projects. This allows users to share data with other users. The software also uses the Bullet physics engine. Users can also use Microsoft's Kinect for several Xbox consoles and Windows updates for motion capturing. Map shadowing, screenshot rendering in several picture file formats and full movie rendering in the .avi file format are also possible.

With the exception of a few models, stages, motion data and accessories that come with the software, all content is created and distributed by users, meaning all rules and restrictions (or lack thereof) vary greatly from case to case. Most models' rules may be found in its readme file, which may be a .txt, pdf or a webpage file. The creator, HiguchiM, has stated he can make no promises regarding how other users' fan-made models can or cannot be used, and is exempt from all responsibility relating to this subject. Models created by users are often made available for public download. As MikuMikuDance is exclusively a posing, animation and environment-building software, modelers use external computer-generated modeling software such as Blender or Metasequoia, to create the model and UV map, while the majority of conversion to the platform (such as facial morphs, bones and physical bodies) is done with a program made especially for 'MMDers', PMD Editor or its successor PMX editor.

The software itself comes with a small number of assets. Models include various Vocaloids created by Crypton Future Media and Fanloids acknowledged by Crypton Future Media. One stage is available, which was inspired by a stage environment found in the game Idolmaster. Accessories include a negi (a leek, Hatsune Miku's character item) and a microphone. Two sample .pmm files (the file type that MMD projects are saved as) allow the user to load in a pre-made project. It also contains a Dammy or Dummy Bone model, which allows for accessories and effects to be attached for ease of animating. No effects come with the MikuMikuDance software, as the MMEffect plugin is community-made, therefore effects must be downloaded online. The software was originally only released in Japanese, however an English version was released at a later date. Videos using the software are regularly seen on sites such as Niconico and YouTube and are popular among Vocaloid fans and users alike. Other websites such as DeviantART and Twitter harbour the majority of still-render art. A magazine which hands out exclusive models with every issue was also produced owing to this popularity. Some models for Vocaloid may also be used for Vocaloid music, going on to be used by studios working with the Vocaloid software.

Many people also buy Windows100% magazines which give models exclusive to the public. These come out once every month and due to popularity, modelers are giving out secret models, as well as models customers have paid for online. Most of these tend to be Vocaloids or models that do not have a particular copyright holder.

On May 26, 2011, continuous updates of the software came to an end and the last version was released. In a closing statement, HiguchiM left the software in the hands of the fans to continue building upon. Despite this, the source code has not been released, and the developer has no intentions of doing so, making it impossible for people to continue building upon the original software. However, there are alternative programs that provide similar functionality, such as MikuMikuMoving (MMD's "replacement" that is updated frequently and has many of the features of MMD, as well as new file formats unique to the program, support for the Oculus Rift head-mounted display and a new UI, among other features), and the free software, Blender.

Between then and now, there have been several small updates to version 7.39, mainly the addition of the x64 version, providing better performance, faster render times, and higher quality, to name a few. However, on June 1 2013, HiguchiM began to release software updates very suddenly. Since June 2013, 20 new versions have been produced. Most of these updates were made to increase compatibility with newer, more advanced .pmx models. It is unknown why HiguchiM returned to the development of MMD. On December 10, 2019, version 9.32 was released, which remains the most current version.

In December 2014, Sekai Project announced that they had acquired permission to release MikuMikuDance on Steam. However, it remains unreleased.

The first anime television series to be fully produced with the software, Straight Title Robot Anime, premiered on February 5, 2013. Other anime that use the software include Tesagure! Bukatsu-mono and Hi-sCoool! SeHa Girls.

In 2021, the MikuMikuEffect Archive (abbreviated to the MMEArchive) was published. The project aimed to serve as a catalogue and centralized guide for MMD effects, though it went on an indefinite hiatus in February 2024 due to website costs and the site's creator moving on to other activities.

== Copyright ==
The software was released as freeware. The models of the Vocaloids provided with the software are subject to Piapro Studio's Character License, and cannot be used for commercial purposes without permission. Although the software is distributed freely, models released independently of the software may not be; originally produced models, motion data, effects and environments may be subject to their creator's own rules. The program does not include all Vocaloids by default, but it includes Crypton Future Media's Vocaloids which are Hatsune Miku, Kagamine Rin, Kagamine Len, KAITO, MEIKO, and Megurine Luka; and although Yowane Haku, Akita Neru, Sakine Meiko, and Kasane Teto are not official Vocaloids (Teto being both an UTAU and a vocal synth for Synthesizer V), they became so popular that Crypton Future Media officially licensed and added them to Hatsune Miku: Project DIVA.
