= Asuka Nishi =

Japanese voice actress (born 1988)

- 西 明日香
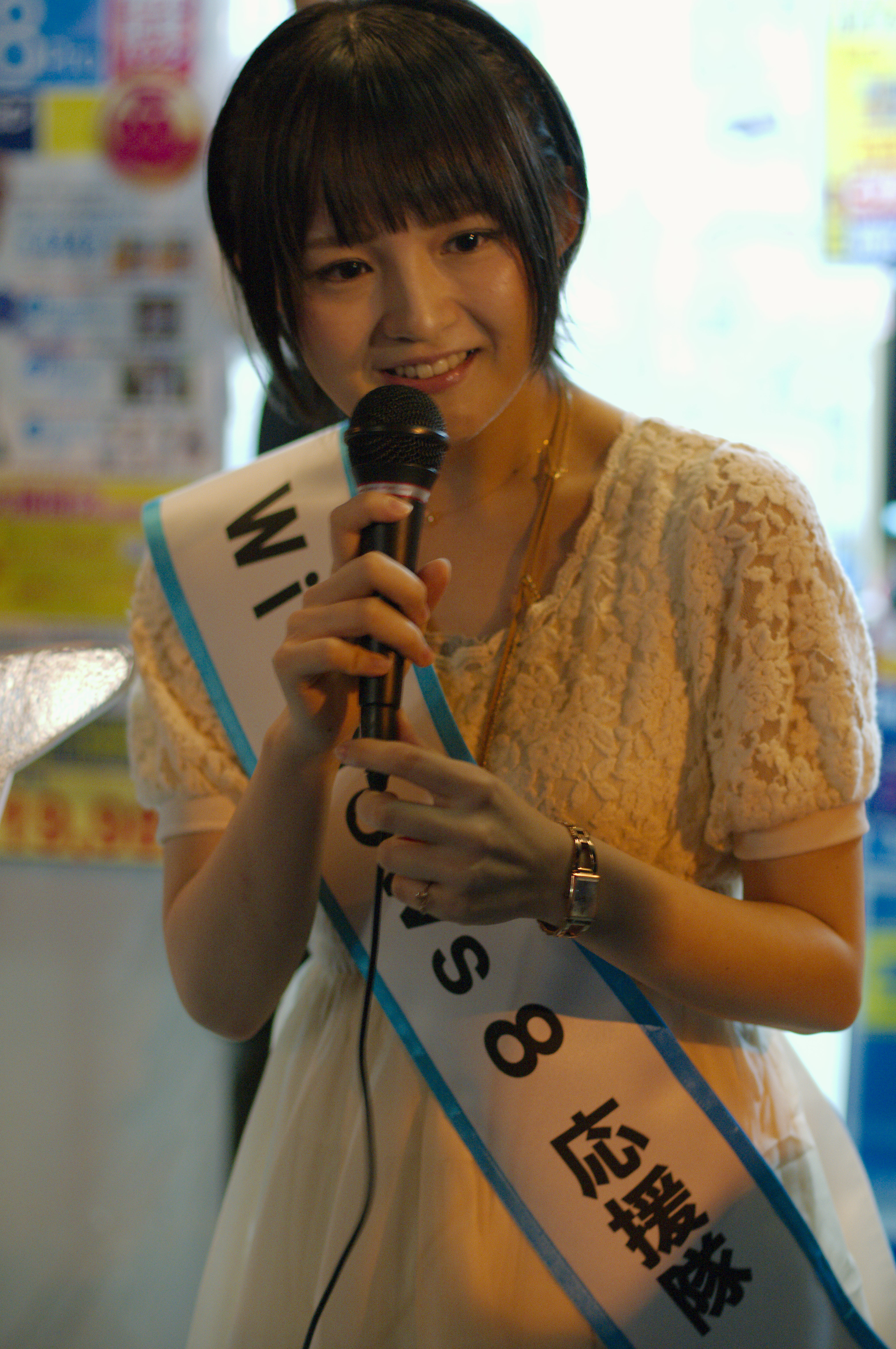
- Nishi in October 2012
- Born: February 10, 1988 (age 38); Hyōgo Prefecture, Japan
- Occupations: Voice actress; narrator
- Years active: 2008–present
- Agent: Sigma Seven
- Height: 159 cm (5 ft 3 in)
- Spouse: Unnamed (m. 2021)
- Children: 1
- Website: nishiasuka.jp

Asuka Nishi (西 明日香, Nishi Asuka; born February 10, 1988) is a Japanese voice actress from Hyōgo Prefecture. She is represented by the talent agency Sigma Seven.

== Personal life ==
In April 2021, Nishi announced through her official social media account that she had registered her marriage to her non-celebrity husband. On November 18 of the following year, she announced that she was pregnant with the couple's first child, and on April 10, 2023, she gave birth to her first child, a daughter.

== Filmography ==
=== Television animation ===
- Chibi Devi! (2011), Shiori
- Hanasaku Iroha (2011), Mai
- Arashi no Yoru ni (2012), Young white goat
- Battle Spirits: Sword Eyes (2012), Yamabuki
- Bodacious Space Pirates (2012), Ursula Abramov
- Ebiten (2012), Hakata Kanamori
- High School DxD (2012), Ravel Phoenix
- Sengoku Collection (2012), Gentleman Bashou Matsuo
- Battle Spirits: Sword Eyes Gekitōden (2013), Yamabuki, Waitress - ep 1
- Kin-iro Mosaic (2013), Shinobu Ōmiya
- Problem Children Are Coming from Another World, Aren't They? (2013), Calico Cat
- Straight Title Robot Anime (2013), Fujii
- Tesagure! Bukatsu-mono (2013), Yua Suzuki
- The Devil Is a Part-Timer! (2013), Rika Suzuki
- Unbreakable Machine-Doll (2013), Henriette Belew
- Yozakura Quartet (2013), Midoriko
- 47 Todō Fuken R (2014), Hyōgo Dog
- Bladedance of Elementalers (2014), Shareiria
- Dai-Shogun - Great Revolution (2014), Sakuragi
- Maken-ki! 2 (2014), Monji
- Sakura Trick (2014), Shinobu Noda
- Selector Infected Wixoss (2014), Yūko
- Tesagure! Bukatsu-mono Encore (2014), Yua Suzuki
- The Irregular at Magic High School (2014), Eimi Akechi
- Gourmet Girl Graffiti (2015), Misaki Yoneya
- High School DxD BorN (2015), Ravel Phoenix
- Is It Wrong to Try to Pick Up Girls in a Dungeon? (2015), Anya
- Hello!! Kin-iro Mosaic (2015), Shinobu Ōmiya
- Mikagura School Suite (2015), Yuriko
- Suzakinishi the Animation (2015), Asuka Nishi
- Tesagure! Bukatsu-mono: Spin-off Puru Purun Sharumu to Asobō (2015), Yua Suzuki
- Gate: Jieitai Kano Chi nite, Kaku Tatakaeri (2016), Meya
- Go! Princess PreCure (2016), Kotori
- Mahō Shōjo Nante Mō Ii Desu Kara. (2016), Pochi
- Magical Girl Raising Project (2016), Tama
- Three Leaves, Three Colors (2016), Kō Hayama
- Black Clover (2017), Mimosa Vermillion
- High School DxD Hero (2018), Ravel Phoenix
- Endro! (2019), Chibi Dragon
- Star Twinkle PreCure (2019), Yanyan
- Magia Record (2020), Meiyui Chun (Ep.6)
- The 8th Son? Are You Kidding Me? (2020), Elize
- Redo of Healer (2021), Anna
- Scarlet Nexus (2021), Naomi Randall
- The Honor Student at Magic High School (2021), Eimi Akechi
- Seirei Gensouki: Spirit Chronicles (2021), Alma
- The Devil Is a Part-Timer!! (2022), Rika Suzuki

=== Original video animation (OVA) ===
- Problem Children Are Coming from Another World, Aren't They? (2013), Female Guest
- High School DxD BorN (2015), Ravel Phoenix

=== Theatrical animation ===
- Death Billiards (2013), Female Patron
- Bodacious Space Pirates: Abyss of Hyperspace (2014), Ursula Abramov
- Kin-iro Mosaic: Thank You!! (2021), Shinobu Ōmiya

=== Video games ===
- Koi Q Bu! (2014), Megumi Tsutsui
- The Irregular at Magic High School Out of Order (2014), Eimi Akechi
- Idol Incidents (2015), Aina Kingetsu
- Idol Paradise (2015), Ange Tears
- Rage of Bahamut (2015), Pine
- Moero Crystal (2015), Lulucie
- Idol Death Game TV (2016), Rito Karasuma
- Magia Record (2017), Meiyui Chun
- Azur Lane (2020), HMS Valiant
- Livestream: Escape from Hotel Izanami (2021), Nana Sakurai
- beat refle (2022), Mei Amamiya
- Love on Leave (2023), Kanami Amakusa

=== Web anime ===
- Starry Sky (2010), Kindergarten Pupil

=== Other ===
- Windows 8 Pro DSP, Madobe Yū

== Discography ==
=== Singles ===
Release date	Title	Catalog No.	Peak weekly Oricon ranking
October 19, 2016	Honey Face	NAMC-001; NAMC-002; NAMC-003	23
