= Yaoyorozu =

Japanese 3D animation studio

Yaoyorozu, Co., Ltd.
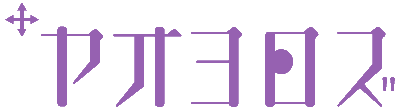
- Native name: ヤオヨロズ株式会社
- Type: Kabushiki gaisha
- Industry: Animation studio
- Founded: August 2013; 13 years ago
- Founder: Ishidate Uraaka
- Defunct: April 2020; 6 years ago
- Headquarters: 3-23-16 Higashi-Azabu, Minato, Tokyo, Japan
- Key people: Yoshihiro Terai; Yoshitada Fukuhara
- Parent: Just Production
- Website: yaoyorozu.info

Yaoyorozu (Japanese: ヤオヨロズ株式会社) was a Japanese animation studio producing anime using cel shading and 3D computer graphics technology.

== History ==
The company was founded in Minato, Tokyo by the screenwriter Ishidate Uraaka in August 2013. It was a subsidiary of Just Production (Japanese: 株式会社ジャストプロ).

The company won the third edition of the CGWORLD (Japanese: シージーワールド) award on December 28, 2017.

On April 1, 2020, it was announced that Yaoyorozu had been dissolved and folded into a new company called 8million, a move meant to consolidate company assets under a single name; little would change in the company's day-to-day business.

== Works ==
=== Television series ===
Title	Broadcast Channel	First run start date	First run end date	Eps	Note(s)	Ref(s)
Straight Title Robot Anime	NOTTV	February 6, 2013	April 24, 2013	12	Original work.	
Tesagure! Bukatsu-mono	NTV	October 5, 2013	December 29, 2013	12	Original work.	
Tesagure! Bukatsu-mono Encore	NTV	January 12, 2014	March 29, 2014	12	Sequel to Tesagure! Bukatsu-mono.	
Minarai Diva	Tokyo MX	July 14, 2014	September 22, 2014	10	Original work.	
Tesagure! Bukatsumono Spin-off Purupurun Sharumu to Asobou	NTV	April 5, 2015	June 28, 2015	12	Sequel to Tesagure! Bukatsu-mono Encore.	
Kemono Friends	TV Tokyo	January 10, 2017	March 28, 2017	12	Based on an Android and iOS game developed by Nexon.	
Kemurikusa	Tokyo MX	January 9, 2019	March 27, 2019	12	Original work.	
