= Straight Title Robot Anime =

Japanese anime television series

- Promotional art for the anime on Niconico.

直球表題ロボットアニメ (Chokkyuu Hyoudai Robotto Anime)
- Genre: Comedy, science fiction
- Anime television series
- Directed by: Kōtarō Ishidate & Toru Nakano (Sound Director)
- Written by: Kōtarō Ishidate
- Music by: ZAQ
- Studio: Yaoyorozu
- Licensed by: NA: Crunchyroll
- Original network: NOTTV
- Original run: February 6, 2013 – April 24, 2013
- Episodes: 12

Straight Title Robot Anime (直球表題ロボットアニメ, Chokkyuu Hyoudai Robotto Anime) is a CG anime that first aired on February 6, 2013, in Japan. The anime is created with the MikuMikuDance animation software and is the first MMD-based program to air on TV.

== Plot ==
The story is set in the year 9013 (Mobile Century 8013) where humans no longer inhabit the planet Earth. However, remaining military robots continue to fight for unknown purpose(s). Three non-combatant robots, Fuji, Kato, and Mori attempt to end the war that lasted for 7 millennia by investigating on human laughter.

== Characters ==
Fuji (フジイ, Fujii)

Voiced by: Asuka Nishi

Kato (カトウ, Katō)

Voiced by: Miho Arakawa

Mori (モリ, Mori)

Voiced by: Rumi Ōkubo

Narrator

Voiced by: Hiroaki Hirata

== Media ==
The anime aired for 12 episodes during the Winter 2013 anime season in Japan, on Tokyo MX and also streamed online on Niconico. Crunchyroll also broadcast the anime to all regions outside Japan. KEI, the designer for Hatsune Miku (as well as other Vocaloids) was the character designer for Straight Title Robot Anime. The director is Kōtarō Ishidate, and the animation director is cort.

The opening theme is "Break the War", sung by Confection Planning, and written and arranged by Steel Soldier. The ending theme is "Reason for Freedom" (自由という理由, Jiyū toiu riyū), which was written, arranged, and sung by ZAQ.
