= Majo wa Mangetsu ni Saku =

Japanese manga series

- First tankōbon volume cover

魔女は満月に咲く
- Genre: Fantasy; Romantic comedy
- Manga
- Written by: Yui Hara
- Published by: Houbunsha
- Imprint: FUZ Comics
- Magazine: Comic Fuz
- Original run: February 26, 2023 – present
- Volumes: 6

Majo wa Mangetsu ni Saku (Japanese: 魔女は満月に咲く; lit. "Witches Bloom Under the Full Moon") is a Japanese manga series written and illustrated by Yui Hara. It began serialization on Houbunsha's Comic Fuz web service in February 2023, and has been compiled into six volumes as of November 2026.

== Plot ==
One night, Kouichi Hotaka, a junior high school student, has a strange dream about seeing a witch who claims to have a connection to him. The following day, Shima Minato, a beautiful girl who resembles the witch in his dream, transfers to his class. Shima quickly develops an attachment to him, much to his friends' surprise given how popular she quickly becomes. Shima claims to be a witch from another world called Astromeria and wants him to sign a contract with her. He declines as he does not know her very well; however, when an examiner claims she will lose her magic if she lacks a partner, he accepts her offer. The two seal their bond with a kiss, after which Shima starts living with him.

== Characters ==
Kouichi Hotaka (帆高 航一, Hotaka Kōichi)
Voiced by: Kanna Nakamura (PV)
A second-year junior high school student. He is described by his friends as having chūnibyō. One night, he dreams about meeting a witch, and is surprised to see that girl, Shima, transfer to his class the next day. While he initially declines her request, he ultimately accepts. He lives with his mother and older sister Marimo as his father is working overseas.
Shima Minato (湊 紫麻, Minato Shima)
Voiced by: Nao Tōyama (PV)
A witch from a world called Astromeria who comes to live on Earth. She transfers to Kouichi's class and quickly falls in love with him, seeing her as her new partner. Because she has just arrived on Earth, she is still unfamiliar with many of its concepts and practices. Like her fellow witches, she aims to top the Witch Exam, which involves going on an exchange program to Earth in order to help improve themselves. Her real name is Rira (リラ).
Nagi Setouchi (瀬戸内 なぎ, Setouchi Nagi)
Kouichi and Shima's classmate. She is Umeko's partner.
Umeko Nanami (七海 梅子, Nanami Umeko)
Nagi's partner and a witch from Astromeria. She has the ability to take on a dog form. Her real name is Plum (プラム, Puramu).
Marimo Hotaka (帆高 まりも, Hotaka Marimo)
Kouichi's older sister and a high school student. She later becomes Ange's partner after Ange appeared in her dream as an idol.
Sousuke Ebihara (海老原 颯介, Ebihara Sōsuke)
Kouichi's classmate and childhood friend.
Kaito Ise (伊勢 海斗, Ise Kaito)
Kouichi's classmate and friend. He has feelings for Shiranami-sensei and is aware of her identity as a witch. Despite being contracted to her, they initially have a distant relationship. His name is a pun on isekai.
Shiranami-sensei (白波先生)
Kouichi and Shima's homeroom teacher. She often feels hung over due to her fondness for alcohol. She is actually also a witch from Astromeria and an exchange student, but decided to stay on Earth rather than study and take the Witch Exam. Her real name is Erika (エリカ).
Ange (アンジュ, Anju)
Shima's childhood friend, who aims to bring her back to Astromeria. Because she has nowhere else to stay, she ends up staying with Kouichi and Shima. She transfers to their school and takes on the name Angela Suzuki (鈴木 アンゲラ, Suzuki Angera). While staying at the Hotaka residence, she becomes attached to Marimo and takes her as her partner.
Elizabeth (エリザベート, Erizabēto)
A being from Astromeria who serves an examiner for the Witch Exam.

== Publication ==
The series is written and illustrated by Yui Hara, who previously created the manga series Kin-iro Mosaic and Wakaba Girl. It began serialization on Houbunsha's Comic Fuz web service on February 26, 2023. The first tankōbon volume was released on November 1, 2023; a promotional video featuring Kanna Nakamura as Kouichi Hotaka and Nao Toyama as Shima Minato was released on October 30, 2023 to promote the volume's release. Six volumes have been released as of November 2, 2026.

No.	Release date	ISBN
1	November 1, 2023	978-4-8322-0339-6
2	April 1, 2024	978-4-8322-0388-4
3	November 5, 2024	978-4-8322-0452-2
4	June 2, 2025	978-4-8322-0512-3
5	June 1, 2026	978-4-8322-0622-9
6	November 2, 2026	978-4-8322-0666-3

== See also ==
- Kin-iro Mosaic, another manga series by the same author
- Wakaba Girl, another manga series by the same author
