= Crunchyroll UK and Ireland =

Anime distributor and licensing company in the United Kingdom and Ireland

Crunchyroll Limited
- Formerly: Golden Square Music (1987–1991); Island World Communications (1991–1993); Manga Entertainment (1993–2021); Funimation UK and Ireland (2021–2022)
- Type: Subsidiary
- Traded as: Crunchyroll UK and Ireland
- Industry: Entertainment
- Genre: Anime
- Founded: 4 December 1987; 38 years ago
- Headquarters: Brunel Building, 2 Canalside Walk, 12th Floor; Paddington, London, England; W2 1DG, United Kingdom
- Area served: United Kingdom; Ireland
- Products: Home video; merchandising
- Parent: Island World Group (1987–1998); Starz Distribution (2004–2015); Crunchyroll, LLC (2019–present) (Note: Through a joint venture between Sony Pictures and Aniplex)

Crunchyroll Limited, trading as Crunchyroll UK and Ireland, is an anime distributor and licensing company in the United Kingdom and Ireland. Founded in 1987 as Island World Communications, the company operated as Manga Entertainment Ltd. until 2021. The company is a wholly owned subsidiary of Crunchyroll, LLC, run by Sony through Sony Pictures and Aniplex.

== History ==
The former Manga Entertainment logo used from 2015 until 2021

=== Original history ===
Golden Square Music was founded in London in 1987 by Chris Blackwell and Andy Frain as a subsidiary of Island Records' Island World Group. Golden Square Music changed its name to Island World Communications in 1991, and to Manga Entertainment in 1993. Manga Entertainment expanded into North America in 1993 with the purchase of L.A. Hero, renamed to Manga US. Over time, Manga Entertainment changed ownership from IDT Entertainment, Liberty Media, and Starz Media.

In November 2014, it was revealed that Manga UK's Director of Marketing and Acquisitions Jerome Mazandarani, and product manager Andrew Hewson had left Manga Entertainment to form Animatsu Entertainment, a new anime licensing company. The company was registered on 11 September 2014, with Mazandarani becoming COO and Hewson becoming marketing manager. On 13 January 2015, Animatsu announced that it had reached a licensing deal with Sentai Filmworks to distribute titles in the United Kingdom and Ireland. The company would also enter into a sales and marketing partnership with Manga UK. With the partnership, Animatsu was responsible for licensing, marketing, and brand management, while Manga UK was responsible for distribution and sales.

On 26 February 2015, the UK branch was acquired from Starz Media, alongside its parent Anchor Bay UK, by managing director Colin Lomax. Anchor Bay UK was renamed to Platform Entertainment and went on to have exclusive rights to the Manga Entertainment branding and catalog in the UK and Ireland. In September of that year, Mazandarani revealed that Animatsu and Manga UK were in the process of merging operations. The Animatsu brand would ultimately be phased out, with its final release being Hello! KINMOZA, released on 2 July 2018. Animatsu Entertainment was dissolved on 31 December 2019.

On 17 June 2016, it was announced that Animatsu had acquired the global rights to the film In This Corner of the World, with Mazandarani credited as "Overseas Manager" for the film. Animatsu later announced that it had reached a distribution deal with Shout! Factory to distribute the film in North America. In the same month, Kaleidoscope Film Distribution announced they had purchased Platform Entertainment and confirmed that they would split Manga UK off as an independent company.

Prior to 2016, Funimation sublicensed its properties for the UK and Ireland market through companies Revelation Films, MVM Entertainment, then-independent Manga Entertainment, and Anime Limited. In 2016, Funimation began directly releasing its titles in the United Kingdom and Ireland, with Funimation handling licensing, localization and branding, and Anime Limited handling distribution and classification. Funimation later distributed My Hero Academia through Universal Pictures UK in 2017, and later through Sony Pictures UK, along with other select titles, in 2018. Funimation later began sub-licensing titles to Manga Entertainment's UK branch in late 2018, before acquiring the company on 29 May 2019.

=== Sony acquisition ===
On 29 May 2019, Sony Pictures, the parent company of American anime distributor Funimation, had announced that they had acquired Manga UK, and was merging its UK and Ireland operations into Manga UK. Manga UK managing director Jerome Mazandarani stated that the acquisition would secure more content for Manga Entertainment, while being able to pursue licenses outside of Funimation.

On 30 May 2019, Manga UK announced that they were co-producing the anime television series Cannon Busters with Netflix.

On 12 April 2021, Funimation announced that Manga Entertainment would officially rebrand to Funimation in the UK and Ireland on 19 April 2021, with the Manga Entertainment brand name remaining on select releases within the region. They stated in a press release that the distribution of digital, physical and theatrical anime would continue "without interruption". Blue Exorcist and Blue Exorcist: Kyoto Saga joined the Funimation catalog in the UK and Ireland the same day, to celebrate the merger.

On 28 March 2022, the company changed its legal name to Crunchyroll Manga Ltd. and again on 21 July 2022 to Crunchyroll Ltd.
