= Kin-iro Mosaic =

Japanese manga and its adaptations

- Cover of the first manga volume, featuring the main characters (from left-to-right): Karen Kujo, Shinobu Omiya, and Alice Cartelet

きんいろモザイク (Kin'iro Mozaiku)
- Genre: Comedy, slice of life
- Manga
- Written by: Yui Hara
- Published by: Houbunsha
- English publisher: NA: Yen Press
- Magazine: Manga Time Kirara Max
- Original run: April 19, 2010 – March 19, 2020
- Volumes: 11
- Anime television series
- Directed by: Tensho
- Written by: Yuniko Ayana
- Music by: Ruka Kawada
- Studio: Studio Gokumi
- Licensed by: NA: Sentai Filmworks; UK: Animatsu Entertainment
- Original network: AT-X, Tokyo MX, BS11 Digital
- English network: SEA: Animax Asia
- Original run: July 6, 2013 – September 21, 2013
- Episodes: 12
- Anime television series

Hello!! Kin-iro Mosaic
- Directed by: Tensho
- Written by: Yuniko Ayana
- Music by: Ruka Kawada
- Studio: Studio Gokumi (Note: Animation production assistance (アニメーション制作協力) for all episodes provided by AXsiZ)
- Licensed by: NA: Sentai Filmworks; UK: Animatsu Entertainment
- Original network: AT-X, Tokyo MX, SUN, KBS, TVh, TVA, BS11
- English network: SEA: Animax Asia
- Original run: April 5, 2015 – June 21, 2015
- Episodes: 12
- Original video animation

Kin-iro Mosaic: Pretty Days
- Directed by: Tensho
- Written by: Yuniko Ayana
- Music by: Ruka Kawada
- Studio: Studio Gokumi; AXsiZ
- Released: November 12, 2016
- Runtime: 50 minutes
- Manga

Kin-iro Mosaic Best wishes
- Written by: Yui Hara
- Published by: Houbunsha
- English publisher: NA: Yen Press
- Magazine: Manga Time Kirara Max
- Original run: May 19, 2020 – March 18, 2021
- Volumes: 1
- Anime film

Kin-iro Mosaic: Thank You!!
- Directed by: Munenori Nawa
- Written by: Yuniko Ayana
- Music by: Ruka Kawada
- Studio: Studio Gokumi; AXsiZ
- Released: August 20, 2021
- Runtime: 1 hour 21 minutes
- icon

Kin-iro Mosaic (Japanese: きんいろモザイク, Hepburn: Kin'iro Mozaiku; lit. "Golden Mosaic"), also known by the abbreviation Kinmoza (きんモザ), is a Japanese four-panel manga written and illustrated by Yui Hara. The series began serialization in Houbunsha's Manga Time Kirara Max magazine in June 2010 issue and is licensed in English by Yen Press. An anime television adaptation by Studio Gokumi aired in Japan between July and September 2013, with a second season airing between April and June 2015. An original video animation was released in November 2016, and an anime film premiered on August 20, 2021.

== Plot ==
Shinobu Omiya is a Japanese high school girl who, five years ago, got a homestay in England with a girl named Alice Cartelet. One day, Shinobu receives a letter from Alice saying she is coming to Japan to live with her. Surely enough, Alice appears and joins Shinobu and her friends Aya Komichi and Yoko Inokuma at her school. She is soon followed by Alice's half-British, half-Japanese friend from England, Karen Kujo, and they later meet Honoka Matsubara, and they all became the best of friends.

== Characters ==
=== Main ===
Shinobu Omiya (大宮 忍, Ōmiya Shinobu)
Voiced by: Asuka Nishi
The graceful, optimistic protagonist, a high school girl who previously stayed over at Alice's home in England. She dreams of becoming an interpreter, but generally has bad grades in English, among other subjects, although she shows talent as a seamstress. She loves western culture, and notably has an obsession with blonde hair. Her friends nickname her Shino, a shortened term for her name.
Alice Cartelet (アリス・カータレット, Arisu Kātaretto)
Voiced by: Manami Tanaka
A girl from England who transfers into Shinobu's school and lives at her house. Highly intelligent, she loves Japanese culture and speaks the language fluently, but can also act childish at times, and has a complex about her short stature.
Aya Komichi (小路 綾, Komichi Aya)
Voiced by: Risa Taneda
Nicknamed "Ayaya" by Karen, Shinobu's classmate, and friend since middle school. Throughout the series, she increasingly develops a crush on Yoko, however she has difficulty being honest with her feelings, and often snaps at her, only to feel bad about it later on. She frequently misinterprets situations between herself and Yoko, responding indignantly and blushing. As a student, she is highly intelligent, and even passed an entrance exam to a prestigious high school, however she turns down the opportunity as she does not wish to be separated from her friends. She is also very shy, and dislikes physical exercise, preferring indoor activities.
Yoko Inokuma (猪熊 陽子, Inokuma Yōko)
Voiced by: Yumi Uchiyama
Shinobu's classmate and childhood friend since elementary school, who often serves as the tsukkomi character. Cheerful, boyish, and very energetic, she seems to be oblivious of Aya's sentiment towards her, however she becomes increasingly aware that Aya cares about her. Like Shinobu, she often struggles to get good grades in school, and she is also very clumsy, on one occasion accidentally breaking her sister's teddy bear. She has two younger siblings: a brother and sister, whom she cares deeply about, but she often worries about their tendency to lie.
Karen Kujo (九条 カレン, Kujō Karen)
Voiced by: Nao Tōyama
A half-British, half-Japanese girl who comes from a rich family and was Alice's friend back in England. She also comes to Japan and enrolls in Shinobu's school. She is very energetic, fun-loving and carefree, not even worrying about her grades or getting fat. She often wears a Union Jack parka jacket over her school uniform and generally speaks in broken Japanese. Being incredibly friendly, she seeks to make friends with all of her classmates, and even her second-year homeroom teacher Akari Kuzehashi, albeit with varying degrees of success.
Honoka Matsubara (松原 穂乃花, Matsubara Honoka)
Voiced by: Ayaka Suwa
Karen's classmate and best friend, who is a member of the tennis club and is often seen bringing Karen homemade snacks. Much like Shinobu, she has a fascination with blonde hair and sees Alice and Karen as royalty. Her family owns a restaurant. Because of her blonde hair fetish, she develops a major crush on Karen, and on one occasion finds herself incredibly nervous to ask Karen for her email address.

=== Recurring ===
Isami Omiya (大宮 勇, Ōmiya Isami)
Voiced by: Yukari Tamura
Shinobu's older sister who is a fashion model. She is often worried about Shinobu, because she is very careless and absent-minded but she manages to handle her very well.
Sakura Karasuma (烏丸 さくら, Karasuma Sakura)
Voiced by: Satomi Satō
Shinobu's English teacher, who is often seen wearing a tracksuit jersey. She is kind, meek, and absent-minded. Alice initially sees her as a rival for Shinobu's affections, but grows fond of her over time. She has two older brothers. She spends most of her time with Kuzehashi, and is constantly asked for advice by her.
Akari Kuzehashi (久世橋 朱里, Kuzehashi Akari)
Voiced by: Saori Ōnishi
A home economics teacher who appears after a year has passed in the story and is the homeroom teacher of class 2-A. She is very conscientious about the example she sets for her students, however she also wants to get along with her students, but always ends up intimidating them. She and Karen have an unusual relationship, initially not getting along with her, but warming up to her over time. Regardless, she often has to berate Karen for forgetting her homework or falling asleep in class, though she makes an increasing effort to not be too stern with her.
Kota Inokuma (猪熊 空太, Inokuma Kōta) and Mitsuki Inokuma (猪熊 美月, Inokuma Mitsuki)
Voiced by: Megumi Han (Kota) and Rie Murakawa (Mitsuki)
Yoko's younger brother and sister, who are both twins. They are often notorious liars, making up weird tales, and generally speak in a monotone. They also help Aya with her crush on Yoko.

== Books and publications ==
=== Manga ===
The original manga by Yui Hara began serialization in Houbunsha's Manga Time Kirara Max magazine in June 2010 issue (April 19, 2010). Eleven tankōbon volumes and two anthology comics have been released as of April 27, 2020. The series has been licensed in English by Yen Press, and in Indonesian by Elex Media Komputindo. A spin-off manga titled Kin-iro Mosaic Best wishes was launched in the July 2020 issue (May 19, 2020) after the ending of the original series, and ended serialization in the May 2021 issue (March 18, 2021). The spin-off manga is also licensed in English by Yen Press.

No.	Original release date	Original ISBN	English release date	English ISBN
1	March 26, 2011	978-4-83-224011-7	December 20, 2016	978-0-31-650146-0
2	April 26, 2012	978-4-83-224143-5	March 21, 2017	978-0-31-643353-2
3	June 27, 2013	978-4-83-224314-9	June 20, 2017	978-0-31-643354-9
4	September 27, 2013	978-4-83-224350-7	September 19, 2017	978-0-31-643356-3
5	November 27, 2014	978-4-83-224497-9	December 19, 2017	978-0-31-643357-0
6	June 27, 2015	978-4-83-224578-5	April 24, 2018	978-0-31-643358-7
7	September 27, 2016	978-4-83-224744-4	September 18, 2018	978-1-97-530177-4
8	July 27, 2017	978-4-83-224855-7	January 22, 2019	978-1-97-530236-8
9	July 26, 2018	978-4-83-224963-9	May 21, 2019	978-1-97-535673-6
10	July 25, 2019	978-4-83-227107-4	March 17, 2020	978-1-97-539946-7
11	April 27, 2020	978-4-83-227186-9	August 31, 2021	978-1-97-533572-4
12	March 26, 2021	978-4-83-227267-5	March 21, 2023	978-1-97-536313-0

=== Art book ===
No.	Title	Release date	ISBN
1	Secret Kin-iro Mosaic	August 27, 2013	ISBN 978-4-8322-4344-6
2	Yui Hara Art Book "Parade"	May 27, 2015	ISBN 978-4-8322-4575-4

=== Comics anthology ===
No.	Release date	ISBN
1	July 27, 2013	ISBN 978-4-8322-4331-6
2	April 27, 2015	ISBN 978-4-8322-4564-8

=== TV Anime Official Guide Book ===
No.	Title	Release date	ISBN
1	Mosaiclopedia	December 26, 2013	ISBN 978-4-8322-4391-0
2	See you next time!	September 26, 2015	ISBN 978-4-8322-4623-2

== Anime ==
A 12-episode anime adaptation was produced by Studio Gokumi, with direction by Tensho and character design by Kazuyuki Ueda. The series aired in Japan on AT-X between July 6 and September 21, 2013, and was simulcast by Crunchyroll. The respective opening and ending themes are "Jumping!!" and "Your Voice", both performed by Rhodanthe* (Asuka Nishi, Manami Tanaka, Risa Taneda, Yumi Uchiyama, and Nao Tōyama). The series is licensed in North America by Sentai Filmworks under the title Kinmoza! A second season, titled Hello!! Kin-iro Mosaic, aired between April 5, 2015, and June 21, 2015, once again simulcast by Crunchyroll. The respective opening and ending themes are "Yumeiro Parade" (夢色パレード, Dream-colored Parade) and "My Best Friends", both performed by Rhodanthe*. As with the first season, the second season was licensed by Sentai Filmworks under the title Hello!! Kinmoza! An original video animation episode, Kin-iro Mosaic: Pretty Days, was released on March 3, 2017. Manga Entertainment licensed both seasons for a UK release, and were released by Animatsu Entertainment as a DVD and Blu-ray combo pack on October 9, 2017, and December 18, 2017. An anime film was announced in March 2020. The film, titled Kin-iro Mosaic: Thank You!!, premiered on August 20, 2021. The film is directed by Munenori Nawa and co-animated by Studio Gokumi and AXsiZ, with Yuniko Ayana writing the scripts, Kazuyuki Ueda designing the characters, and Ruka Kawada composing the film's music. On August 1, 2020, both seasons were removed from Crunchyroll, along with 76 other titles which were licensed by Sentai Filmworks. In 2023, "KINMOZA! Pretty Days" and "KINMOZA Thank You!!" were licensed for release on HIDIVE.

On March 18, 2026, the first season of Kin-iro Mosaic made its debut on the HIDIVE platform, with Comic Book saying that "the platform has yet to announce the streaming date of the sequel."

=== Theme song ===
Season 1

Opening theme

"Jumping!!" by Rhodanthe*

Lyrics: yukio
Composer: Meis Clauson
Arranger: Hiroshi Uesugi

Ending theme

"Your Voice" by Rhodanthe*

Lyrics, composer: Takeshi Nakatsuka
Arranger: Hiroshi Uesugi

Insert song

"Happy birthday to you" (おたんじょうびのうた) (Episode 4)

by Alice Cartelet (Manami Tanaka)

"Silver Snow Drop" (ぎんいろスノウドロップ, Giniro Snow Drop) by Alice Cartelet (Manami Tanaka) (Episode 7)

Lyrics: RUCCA
Composer: Takaharu Anzai
Arranger: Nao Tokisawa

"Sakura Color Cherish" (さくらいろチェリッシュ, Sakura iro cherisshu) by Rhodanthe* (Episode 7)

Lyrics: RUCCA
Composer: Ken-G
Arranger: Hiroshi Uesugi

Season 2

Opening theme

"Dream Color Parade" (夢色パレード, Yumeiro Parade) by Rhodanthe* (Episodes 2–9, 11–12)

Lyrics: yuiko
Composer: Meis Clauson
Arranger: Hiroshi Uesugi
The first part of episodes 3, 5, 7, 9, and 11 was solo of Alice Cartelet (Manami Tanaka), Shinobu Omiya (Asuka Nishi), Karen Kujo (Nao Toyama), Aya Komichi (Risa Taneda), and Yoko Inokuma (Yumi Uchiyama) respectively with different lyrics. Other episodes is the chorus of Rhodanthe*

"Glitter Summer Rainbow" (きらめきいろサマーレインボー, Kirameki-iro samāreinbō) (Episode 10)

Lyrics: yuiko
Composer: Masaaki Ishihara
Arranger: Hiroshi Uesugi

Ending theme

"My Best Friends" by Rhodanthe*

Lyrics, Composer: Takeshi Nakatsuka
Arranger: Hiroshi Uesugi

=== Blu-ray Disc/DVD ===
Season	No.	Release date	Episodes included	Product number	
Season	No.	Release date	Episodes included	BD	DVD
Season 1	1	September 25, 2013	1st episode–2nd episode	ZMXZ-8771	ZMBZ-8781
Season 1	2	October 30, 2013	3rd episode–4th episode	ZMXZ-8772	ZMBZ-8782
Season 1	3	November 27, 2013	5th episode–6th episode	ZMXZ-8773	ZMBZ-8783
Season 1	4	December 25, 2013	7th episode–8th episode	ZMXZ-8774	ZMBZ-8784
Season 1	5	January 29, 2014	9th episode–10th episode	ZMXZ-8775	ZMBZ-8785
Season 1	6	February 26, 2014	11th episode–12th episode	ZMXZ-8776	ZMBZ-8786
Season 1	BOX	November 25, 2016	1st episode–12th episode	ZMAZ-10884	—
Season 2	1	June 24, 2015	1st episode–2nd episode	ZMXZ-10041	ZMBZ-10051
Season 2	2	July 24, 2015	3rd episode–4th episode	ZMXZ-10042	ZMBZ-10052
Season 2	3	August 26, 2015	5th episode–6th episode	ZMXZ-10043	ZMBZ-10053
Season 2	4	September 25, 2015	7th episode–8th episode	ZMXZ-10044	ZMBZ-10054
Season 2	5	October 28, 2015	9th episode–10th episode	ZMXZ-10045	ZMBZ-10055
Season 2	6	November 25, 2015	11th episode–12th episode	ZMXZ-10046	ZMBZ-10056
Season 2	BOX	March 18, 2020	1st episode–12th episode	ZMAZ-13801	—
OVA	1	March 3, 2017	—	ZMXZ-11007	ZMBZ-11008
Film	1	April 27, 2022	—	ZMXZ-15402	ZMBZ-15403

=== CD ===
Title	Release date	Product number	
Title	Release date	First version	Normal version
TV Animation Kin-iro Mosaic Hajimemashite Yoroshikune (TVアニメーション きんいろモザイク サウンドブック はじめまして よろしくね。)	August 21, 2013		VTCL-60349
TV Animation Kin-iro Mosaic Sound Book Itsu Made Mo Isshodayo (TVアニメーション きんいろモザイク サウンドブック いつまでも一緒だよ。）	October 9, 2013		VTCL-6035
『Hello!! Kin-iro Mosaic』Character CD Music Palette 1 Shinobu*Alice『ハロー!!きんいろモザイク』キャラクターCD Music Palette 1 忍*アリス	December 3, 2014	VTZL-89	VTCL-35196
『Hello!! Kin-iro Mosaic』Character CD Music Palette 2 Aya*Yoko『ハロー!!きんいろモザイク』キャラクターCD Music Palette 2 綾*陽子	February 4, 2015	VTZL-90	VTCL-35197
『Hello!! Kin-iro Mosaic』角色CD Music Palette 3 Karen*Honoka『ハロー!!きんいろモザイク』キャラクターCD Music Palette 3 カレン*穂乃花	April 1, 2015	VTZL-91	VTCL-35198
TV Animation『Hello!! Kin-iro Mosaic』Sound Book "Mata, Aetane" (TVアニメーション『ハロー!!きんいろモザイク』サウンドブック「また、会えたね。」)	June 17, 2015		VTCL-60401

== Appearances in other media ==
Characters and songs from Kin-iro Mosaic appear alongside other anime characters in the crossover rhythm game Miracle Girls Festival, which is developed by Sega for the PlayStation Vita. Characters from the series also appear in the mobile game Kirara Fantasia.

== See also ==
- Majo wa Mangetsu ni Saku, another manga series by Yui Hara
- Wakaba Girl, another manga series by Yui Hara
