= Battle Spirits: Sword Eyes =

Japanese anime television series

バトルスピリッツ ソードアイズ
- Created by: Hajime Yatate
- Anime television series
- Produced by: Masaki Watanabe
- Written by: Atsuhiro Tomioka
- Music by: Eishi Segawa
- Studio: Sunrise
- Original network: ANN (Nagoya TV, TV Asahi)
- Original run: 9 September 2012 – 8 September 2013
- Episodes: 50

Battle Spirits: Sword Eyes (バトルスピリッツ ソードアイズ, Batoru Supirittsu Sōdo Aizu) is a Japanese anime series. It premiered on 9 September 2012.

== Plot ==
Atlantia had been ravaged by riots and civil wars following the emperor's death many years ago. But with the ascension of young king Yaiba, rebel traitors were executed and peace was restored. However, the authoritarian rule remained, causing Atlantia to linger in the shadows of radical governance. Living in the countryside with vague memories of his parents, Tsurugi Tatewaki is a spirited teen. One day, he stumbles upon a mystical sword that transforms into a Battle Spirits card. Soon, Atlantian forces attempt to take Tsurugi's card, and his mysterious past begins to unravel. Joined by a droid named Bringer, Tsurugi travels to the Atlantian capital and meets fighters wielding similar swords. As Tsurugi's life becomes increasingly complicated by unfolding mysteries, he must rethink his beliefs about good and evil.

== Characters ==
=== Sword Eyes of Light ===
Tsurugi Tatewaki (ツルギ・タテワキ, Tsurugi Tatewaki) (Sword/Flamberge/Excalibur)
Voiced by: Junko Minagawa
The main protagonist of the series and the wielder of the Red Sword Eyes of Light. During the mid-series, Tsurugi lost his Red Sword Eye of Light due to his battle with Yaiba, but gains the Sword Eye of Darkness afterwards.
Bringer (ブリンガー, Buringar)
Voiced by: Junichi Suwabe
Bringer is a card battler droid, who took Tsurugi away from Atlantia when he was a baby. He stayed locked in a room like a statue, but awakened when Tsurugi was in danger, in order to protect him. He is skilled in Battle Spirits, and carries a deck on him.
Sora Ryuyo (ソラ・リュウヨウ, Sora Ryūyō) (Jian)
Voiced by: Yūki Ono
Sora is the blue Sword Eyes of Light. He is a droid mechanic and lives with his younger brother, Long. He has been a friend of Kizakura's since he met her as a child at a stand selling secondhand parts.
Kizakura Kukuri (キザクラ・ククリ, Kisakura Kukuri) (Rapier)
Voiced by: Yui Horie
Kizakura is the yellow Sword Eyes of Light. She is a member of a group called the Sweetsmates, along with her friends Yamabuki and Kogane, and many unnamed members. She lost her parents, possibly due to abandonment, and had to struggle to survive when she was younger. This was made especially difficult due to some adults who liked to bully her and other children, taking the food she did work to earn.
Hagakure Shidou (ハガクレ・シドー, Hagakure shidō) (Naginata)
Voiced by: Jun Fukuyama
Hagakure is the green Sword Eyes of Light. He comes from a ninja village, and practices the Yamabiko ninja arts. His best friend is a giant bird named Hayatemaru. He considers them to have a bond even stronger than brothers.
Suou Rakels (スオウ・ラケルス; Suō Rakerusu)
Voiced by: Daisuke Sakaguchi
Suou Rakels is a homunculus created by Rirove using alchemy in an attempt to revive his deceased brother. Unfortunately for him, according to Rirove, he is a failed product only escaping death upon meeting the Tsurugi and the Swords of Light.
Haqua Estoc (ハクア・エストック, Hakua Esutokku) (Cutlass)
Voiced by: Rie Kugimiya
Haqua is the white Sword Eyes of Light. He is from the ice continent Xamuler, and he came to Atlantia to sell its specialty, never-melting ice.

=== Sword Eyes of Darkness ===
Yaiba (白夜王ヤイバ, Byakuya-ō Yaiba) (Saber)
Voiced by: Hikaru Midorikawa
Yaiba is the white Sword Eyes of Darkness. He is Tsurugi's older brother who was manipulated by Garudos Randall. He was born on the day of the midnight sun, which is a holiday. Yaiba made himself the king of Atlantia after his father's death. He is trying to gather the 12 Sword Eyes and Sword Braves, but claims that isn't all he needs for his plan.
Brau Balm (ブラウ・バルム, Burau Bāmu) (Zweihander)
Voiced by: Hiroki Yasumoto
Brau Balm is the blue Sword Eyes of Darkness who very serious and cold. He never tolerates failure and he is obsessed with getting revenge on Bringer. Brau is also extremely loyal to Yaiba. He was born into a family who had traditionally served in the royal family's imperial guard. 14 years ago, he tried to chase down Bringer, when he fled Atlantia with Tsurugi. He failed to stop Bringer, and got his scar in that incident.
Gordy Dain (ゴーディー・ダーイン, Gōdi Dein) (Falchion)
Voiced by: Hiroshi Yanaka
Gordy Dain is the green Sword Eyes of Darkness, although he didn't have his Sword Brave at the beginning. He had his subordinate Cornell attack Pacifice, and scolded him when he failed. However, obtain the sword of darkness afterwards.
Amarello Berge (アマレロ・ベルジェ, Amarerro Beruhe) (Basket-hilted sword)
Voiced by: Akemi Kanda
Amarello is the yellow Sword Eyes of Darkness who tends to act smug most of the time, and appears as if she wants Yaiba to succeed, which is likely an act. Her father was a member of the Red Army. She went to Megallanion as an envoy, to try and convince king Megalla II to allow Stinger armies to be placed in the country.
Rirove Rakels (リローヴ・ラケルス, Rirōvu Rakerusu) (Executioner's sword)
Voiced by: Daisuke Namikawa
Rirove is the purple Sword Eyes of Darkness. He comes from Stoke, an underground land of alchemy masters. He seemingly created Suou, using alchemy, from his original deceased brother. Because Suou was a failure, he wanted to kill him. Although he loved the original Suou, his artificial brother, he calls this Suou a "doll of bones."

=== Antagonists ===
Garudos Randall (ガルドス・ランダル, Garudosu Randōru) (Gram)
Voiced by: Sho Hayami
Garudos Randall is regent of Atalantia, who works closely with the ruling family and the main antagonist of Battle Spirits: Sword Eyes. Garudos is the manipulative man with a god complex who aims to surpass his deceased brother, Vargas and be the ruler of Legendia. He trained Yaiba in politics since he was young. By the start of the series, he killed Tsurugi and Yaiba's father, which resulted in the violent rebellion, and working under the latter while putting one well-hidden facade, who ordered him to hunt down anyone who would rebel. Along with Yaiba, he wants to gather the 12 Sword Eyes and Sword Braves. However in doing this, he manipulated Yaiba and others into gathering the 12 Sword Eyes and Sword Braves and to obtain the power of the Sword of Judgment, a god-like Sword Eye that controls the world of Legendia. He later merges with God as he claims he froze time for himself was to preserve his body so it could be God's vessel. In the final battle, Garudos threatens to destroy Legendia if Tsurugi doesn't battle him and every time Tsurugi loses a life, his Iron Hammer would drop a little closer, and ultimately destroy the world if Tsurugi loses. Ultimately, Garudos was finally defeated and Yaiba uses the Sword of Judgement to destroy God permanently. Upon realizing that he will never be able to surpass Vargas and regrets his actions, Garudos finally passes away with his soul departing with Vargas'.
Caladbolgar (カラドボルガル, Karadoborugaru)
Voiced by: Masayoshi Sugawara
Caladbolgar is a sadistic ancient droid who works for Garudos. He awakened after Garudos obtained the Sword of Judgment. In the past, he devoured countless souls of deceased Sword Eyes users. Garudos ordered him to eat Vargas, which he claimed would make him "perfect." He seemed to succeed. Later, he tried to eat Tsurugi and Yaiba. Bringer fought against him to protect Tsurugi. The fight ended when Justice Tachibana and Bomber interfered. Caladbolgar later fought against Bringer again, who was trying to prevent the Iron Hammer of God from dropping on Legendia. He was destroyed for good by the powered-up Bringer.
