= Manami Tanaka =

Japanese voice actress (born 1989)

- 田中 真奈美
- Born: November 21, 1989 (age 36); Hiroshima Prefecture, Japan
- Occupation: Voice actress
- Years active: 2010–present
- Agent: Production Baobab

Manami Tanaka (田中 真奈美, Tanaka Manami) (born November 21, 1989) is a Japanese voice actress.

== Early life ==
Tanaka was born in Hiroshima Prefecture.

== Filmography ==
=== Anime series ===
- Sacred Seven, Manami
- Kin-iro Mosaic, Alice Cartelet
- Bladedance of Elementalers, Carol Natassha
- Recently, My Sister is Unusual, Ayaka Tachibana
- Shimajirō no Wow!, Snow Rabbit
- Strike the Blood, Minami Shindō
- The Comic Artist and His Assistants, Matome Minano
- Absolute Duo, Otoha Kokonoe
- Hello!! Kin-iro Mosaic, Alice Cartelet
- Rilu Rilu Fairilu: Yousei no Door, Ofuku-san
- Keijo, Kaho Fuyuzora
- Cultural Exchange with a Game Centre Girl, Sheryl Baker

=== Video games ===
- Rage of Bahamut (2014), Connie
- Uchi no Hime-sama ga Ichiban Kawaii (2014), Anna
- Dream C Club Gogo (2014), Chiri
- Kirara Fantasia (2017), Solt, Alice Cartelet
- Arknights (2019), Haruka (English dub)

=== Dubbing roles ===
==== Live Action ====
- Just Add Magic – Hannah Parker-Kent (Aubrey Miller)

=== Other ===
- CeVIO AI Talk voice and Synthesizer V voice provider, Tsurumaki Maki
