= List of Princess Connect! Re:Dive episodes =

Princess Connect! Re:Dive is an anime series adapted by CygamesPictures based on the video game of the same name developed by Cygames. It was directed by Takaomi Kanasaki with assistant directing by Kana Harufuji. Satomi Kurita, Lie Jun Yang and Yasuyuki Noda provided character designs. The series aired in Japan from April 7 to June 30, 2020, on Tokyo MX, BS11, Sun TV, and KBS Kyoto before airing on other channels. It was also simulcast in North America by Crunchyroll.

== Series overview ==
Season	Episodes	Originally released	
Season	Episodes	First released	Last released
1	13	April 7, 2020	June 30, 2020
2	12	January 11, 2022	March 29, 2022

== Episodes ==
=== Season 1 (2020) ===
No. overall	No. in season	Title	Directed by	Written by	Storyboarded by	Original release date (Note: Episodes were released on AbemaTV every Tuesday at 12:00 a.m. JST, 30 minutes before the original air time on Tokyo MX.)
1	1	"The Adventure Begins ~Sautéed Mushrooms at Sunset~"; Transliteration: "Bōken no Hajimari～Yūyake Sora ni Kinoko no Sotē～" (Japanese: 冒険の始まり～夕焼け空にきのこのソテー～)	Kana Shundō	Takaomi Kanasaki	Takaomi Kanasaki	April 7, 2020
2	2	"A Moody Cat's Mischief ~Warm, Golden Rice Balls~"; Transliteration: "Kimagure Neko no Itazura～Koganeiro no Pokapoka Onigiri～" (Japanese: きまぐれ猫の悪戯～黄金色のポカポカおにぎり～)	Shunsuke Ishikawa	Takaomi Kanasaki	Takaomi Kanasaki	April 14, 2020
3	3	"The Epicurean Frontier ~Heavenly Fruit Is the Secret Ingredient~"; Transliteration: "Bishoku no Furontia～Kakushiaji ni Tenjō no Kajitsu o Soete〜" (Japanese: 美食のフロンティア～隠し味に天上の果実を添えて～)	Yoshinari Suzuki	Takaomi Kanasaki	Takaomi Kanasaki	April 21, 2020
4	4	"Welcome to the Gourmet Guild ~Beef Stew at Nightfall~"; Transliteration: "Yōkoso Bishoku-den～Yoi no Tobari ni Bīfu Shichū〜" (Japanese: ようこそ美食殿～宵のとばりにビーフシチュー～)	Tetsuaki Matsuda	Takaomi Kanasaki	Takaomi Kanasaki	April 28, 2020
5	5	"Porridge Made With Love ~Topped with a Twilight Fate~"; Transliteration: "Aijō Tappuri Porijji～Towairaito na Unmei o Nosete〜" (Japanese: 愛情たっぷりポリッジ～トワイライトな運命をのせて～)	Yoshimichi Hirai	Takaomi Kanasaki	Takaomi Kanasaki	May 5, 2020
6	6	"Melody of Departure ~Aromatic Spices under the Starry Sky~"; Transliteration: "Tabidachi no Shirabe～Hoshizora wa Supaisu no Kaori〜" (Japanese: 旅立ちの調べ～星空はスパイスの香り～)	Tarō Kubo	Takaomi Kanasaki	Takaomi Kanasaki	May 12, 2020
7	7	"A Light to Pierce the Darkness ~Like Two Sisters in a Pod~"; Transliteration: "Yami Ugatsu Hikari～Nakayoshi Shimai no Mariāju〜" (Japanese: 闇穿つ光～仲良し姉妹のマリアージュ～)	Yasuo Iwamoto	Takaomi Kanasaki	Takaomi Kanasaki	May 19, 2020
8	8	"A Little, Lyrical Kids' Meal ~Country-Style Fried Eggs~"; Transliteration: "Ritoru de Ririkaru na Okosama Ranchi～Den'en-fū Tamagoyaki Setto〜" (Japanese: リトルでリリカルなお子様ランチ～田園風玉子焼きセット～)	Yoshihisa Iida	Hiroyuki Kamei	Kana Shundō	May 26, 2020
9	9	"A Gourmet Getaway ~Fragrant Tentacles on the Beach~"; Transliteration: "Bishoku no Bakansu～Iso no Kaori wa Tentakuru〜" (Japanese: 美食のバカンス～磯の香りはテンタクル～)	Kyōhei Yamamoto	Takaomi Kanasaki	Shinobu Tagashira	June 2, 2020
10	10	"Flowers in Eternal Darkness ~Cursed Pudding~"; Transliteration: "Tokoyami ni Tsudoishi Hana～Noroi no Pudingu na no〜" (Japanese: 常闇に集いし華～呪いのプディングなの～)	Tetsuaki Matsuda	Takaomi Kanasaki	Takaomi Kanasaki	June 9, 2020
11	11	"Evening Home ~A Crispy Quest Hot Dog~"; Transliteration: "Yūgure Mai Hōmu～Sakusaku Tansaku Hotto Doggu〜" (Japanese: 夕暮れマイホーム～サクサク探索ホットドッグ～)	Yoshinari Suzuki	Takaomi Kanasaki	Yoshimasa Hiraike, Kana Shundō, Takaomi Kanasaki	June 16, 2020
12	12	"The Whimsical Patissier's Specialty ~A Memory of Labyrinths and Crepes~"; Transliteration: "Kimagure Patishie Jiman no Ippin～Meikyū to Kurēpu no Memorī〜" (Japanese: きまぐれパティシエ自慢の一品～迷宮とクレープのメモリー～)	Shunji Yoshida	Takaomi Kanasaki	Takaomi Kanasaki	June 23, 2020
13	13	"Lost Princess ~Garnished with Smiles~"; Transliteration: "Rosuto Purinsesu～Minna no Egao o Soete〜" (Japanese: ロストプリンセス～皆の笑顔を添えて～)	Yasuo Iwamoto	Takaomi Kanasaki	Takaomi Kanasaki, Kana Shundō, Yoshimasa Hiraike	June 30, 2020

=== Season 2 (2022) ===
No. overall	No. in season	Title	Directed by	Storyboarded by	Original release date
14	1	"A Walk on the Gourmet Side ~Curiosity Is the Best Bouquet Garni~"; Transliteration: "Bishoku o Tazunete～Kōkishin wa Saikō no Būke Garuni〜" (Japanese: 美食を訪ねて〜好奇心は最高のブーケガルニ〜)	Yasuo Iwamoto	Takaomi Kanasaki	January 11, 2022
15	2	"A Moody Cat's Hesitation ~Antipasto in the Moonlight~"; Transliteration: "Kimagure Neko no Tamerai～Tsukiakari no Antipasuto〜" (Japanese: きまぐれ猫の躊躇い〜月明かりのアンティパスト〜)	Yūji Tokuno	Takaomi Kanasaki	January 18, 2022
16	3	"Tea Party in the Mysterious Forest ~Afternoon Carries the Scent of Danger~"; Transliteration: "Fushigi na Mori no Tī Pātī～Afutānūn wa Kiken na Kaori～" (Japanese: 不思議な森のティーパーティー～アフターヌーンは危険な香り～)	Yoshifumi Sasahara	Takaomi Kanasaki	January 25, 2022
17	4	"The Budding Detective ~Mirror Glaze on the Mind~"; Transliteration: "Kakedashi no Mei Tantei～Mirowāru ni Omoi o Yosete～" (Japanese: 駆け出しの名探偵～ミロワールに想いを寄せて～)	Takahito Sakazume	Takahito Sakazume	February 1, 2022
18	5	"Light and Darkness as One ~Churrasco of Indecision and Resolve~"; Transliteration: "Senaka Awase no Hikari to Yami～Mayoi to Ketsui no Shurasuko～" (Japanese: 背中合わせの光と闇～迷いと決意のシュラスコ～)	Yoshihisa Iida	Takaomi Kanasaki	February 8, 2022
19	6	"Code Name: Monika ~Bouillabaisse Is Best Enjoyed Hot~"; Transliteration: "Kōdo Nēmu: Monika～Buiyabēsu wa Atatakai Uchi ni～" (Japanese: コードネーム：モニカ～ブイヤベースは温かいうちに～)	Yūji Tokuno	Kōichi Kikuta	February 15, 2022
20	7	"The Prankster Pixie ~Cuore in the Mist~"; Transliteration: "Itazurazuki no Pikushī～Kasumi no Naka no Kuōre～" (Japanese: 悪戯好きのピクシー～霞の中のクオーレ～)	Seo Hye-Jin	Takaomi Kanasaki	February 22, 2022
21	8	"A Letter to Join Feelings ~Arancini on the Green Hill~"; Transliteration: "Shiawase o Tsunagu Tegami～Midori no Oka no Aranchīni～" (Japanese: 幸せを繋ぐ手紙～緑の丘のアランチーニ～)	Kento Nakagomi	Takaomi Kanasaki, Shin'ya Kawatsura	March 1, 2022
22	9	"Converging Hearts, Passing Souls ~Crepes the Flavor of a Promise~"; Transliteration: "Chikazuku Kokoro, Surechigau Tamashī～Kurēpu wa Chikai no Aji de～" (Japanese: 近づく心、すれ違う魂～クレープは誓いの味で～)	Yoshifumi Sasahara	Takaomi Kanasaki, Chengzhi Liao	March 8, 2022
23	10	"Landosol at Sundown"; Transliteration: "Rakujitsu no Randosoru" (Japanese: 落日のランドソル)	Shinsuke Gomi	Takaomi Kanasaki	March 15, 2022
24	11	"Those Who Fight Back"; Transliteration: "Aragau Mono-tachi" (Japanese: 抗う者たち)	Chengzhi Liao, Yoshihisa Iida	Takaomi Kanasaki, Chengzhi Liao	March 22, 2022
25	12	"Connecting the Pieces with You Once More"; Transliteration: "Mō Ichido, Kimi to Tsunagaru Monogatari" (Japanese: もう一度、キミとつながる物語)	Yasuo Iwamoto, Atsushi Nakagawa, Ken Yamamoto, Takaomi Kanasaki	Kōichi Kikuta, Ken Yamamoto, Takaomi Kanasaki, Atsushi Nakagawa	March 29, 2022
