= Tomica Hyper Rescue Drive Head Kidō Kyūkyū Keisatsu =

Anime television series

- Tomica Hyper Rescue Drive Head Mobile Emergency Police
- Drive Head key visual

トミカハイパーレスキュー ドライブヘッド 機動救急警察
- Genre: Mecha
- Anime television series
- Directed by: Takao Kato
- Written by: Kenichi Araki
- Music by: Yoshihisa Hirano
- Studio: OLM, Inc., Xebec
- Original network: JNN (TBS TV)
- Original run: April 15, 2017 – December 23, 2017
- Episodes: 37
- Original net animation
- Directed by: Takao Kato
- Written by: Kenichi Araki
- Music by: Yoshihisa Hirano
- Studio: OLM, Inc., Xebec
- Released: January 19, 2018 – August 18, 2018
- Runtime: 15 minutes
- Episodes: 8
- Anime film

Eiga Drive Head: Tomica Hyper Rescue Kidō Kyūkyū Keisatsu
- Directed by: Takao Kato
- Written by: Kenichi Araki
- Music by: Yoshihisa Hirano
- Studio: OLM, Inc., Xebec
- Released: August 24, 2018

Tomica Hyper Rescue Drive Head Mobile Emergency Police (Japanese: トミカハイパーレスキュー ドライブヘッド 機動救急警察, Hepburn: Tomika Haipā Resukyū Doraibuhedoo Kidō Kyūkyū Keisatsu) is a Japanese anime television series made to promote Takara Tomy's long-running Tomica toyline of miniature toy cars. It aired on Saturday mornings at 7:00 am on the new hour-long Anisata block on TBS and affiliated stations. The original series aired from April 15, 2017, to December 23 of the same year, while 2018 featured a monthly 8 episode follow-up. A feature film was released a week later, tying it in with its concurrently airing successor series, Shinkansen Henkei Robo Shinkalion, with main character Hayato Hayasugi crossing over with the E5 Hayabusa.

== Plot ==
In the near future, to cope with various incidents and disasters as well as crime, the Mobile Rescue Police developed the Drive Head, which transforms from a vehicle form to the robotic Walker Vehicle form. Gō Kurumada, the son of the Drive Head's developer, was discovered to be a suitable driver for Drive Head 01 Sonic Interceptor. He and the other children who were selected must bravely stand up to face incidents and disasters.

== Characters ==
=== Team Drive Head ===
Gō Kurumada (車田 ゴウ, Kurumada Gou)
Voiced by: Natsumi Fujiwara
The protagonist. A 5th grader who is the driver of Drive Head 01 Sonic Interceptor. After the frame is damaged in the 11th episode, it is upgraded to Drive Head 01 Mk-II Cyclone Interceptor. His father and grandfather were involved in the development of the Drive Head. Gō is always an optimistic person. Although he can be frivolous and likes to do things his own way, he is genuinely friendly. He has a photographic memory and can instantly burn images of what he sees into his mind. This helps him conduct rescues during disasters. He is forbidden from revealing the secret that he is a driver to his friends, which he is unhappy about. His favorite food is curry.
Taiga Yagura (矢倉 タイガ, Yagura Taiga)
Voiced by: Sachi Kokuryu
Gō's rival. A 5th grader who is the driver of Drive Head 02 Rescue Backdraft. It is upgraded to Drive Head 02 Mk-II Brave Backdraft in the 23rd episode, to increase its heat resistance. During the web series, it is upgraded to Drive Head 02 Mk-III Master Backdraft, which has increased power and speed, as well as a flight unit. Taiga is a talented athlete, and also plays the piano. At first he wouldn't talk much to Gō and the other drivers, but became a close friend over time. At school, he is very popular with girls. Commander Saionji is his uncle.
Jin Ishino (石野 ジン, Ishino Jin)
Voiced by: Kei Shindou
Mikoto's twin brother. A 5th grader who is the co-driver of Drive Head 03 White Hope, which he and his sister share. It is upgraded to Drive Head 03 Mk-II White Crystal Hope in the 22nd episode. He is introverted and a gentle person who dislikes conflict. He and his sister were both influenced by their parents, who are doctors working overseas. He has a crush on Sala Manda, an idol singer.
Mikoto Ishino (石野 ミコト, Ishino Mikoto)
Voiced by: Sachika Misawa
Jin's twin sister. A 5th grader who is the co-driver of Drive Head 03 White Hope, which she and her brother share. It is upgraded to Drive Head 03 Mk-II White Crystal Hope in the 22nd episode. During the web series, Mikoto gets a personal Drive Head, Drive Head 03 Mk-II White Pearl Hope. She is quite feminine and is popular in school. She is daring as well as assertive. Mikoto, as well as Jin, has great mathematical ability. Her favorite food is pancakes.

=== Mobile Rescue Police Staff ===
Jō Kurumada (車田 ジョー, Kurumada Jou)
Voiced by: Kenji Hamada
Gō's father and the Chief Engineer to the Mobile Rescue Police. He took over development of the Drive Head project after the death of his father, Jōtarō. He has been close friends with Commander Saionji since they were in school. He also has ties with Karigari, who holds a grudge on him. Jō is crazy about dams, and goes annually to watch a dam's discharge. He has a wife, Kumiko, who is not affiliated with the Mobile Rescue Police.
Takahito Saionji (西園寺 貴仁, Saionji Takahito)
Voiced by: Kenichirou Matsuda
Commander of the Mobile Rescue Police. He is Taiga's uncle. No matter the disaster or incident, he handles the case calmly, leading the rescue work.
Arisa Munakata (宗像 亜里沙, Munakata Arisa)
Voiced by: Kaho Kouda
The Chief to Team Drive Head, who drives the Transporter and gives instructions while on the scene of a rescue. She controls the Support Vehicles remotely. She later becomes the primary driver of Transporter Gaia and assists in rescues more directly. She grew up on an island, where her grandmother, Sanae, currently lives.
Megumi Shinmon (新門 めぐみ, Shinmon Megumi)
Voiced by: Ami Koshimizu
An operator. She also works as a counselor at Gō's school. If the drivers miss class because they have to launch, she makes them take supplementary lessons. She has to reprimand Gō whenever he's about to reveal that he's a Drive Head driver.
Hayato Isurugi (石動 速人, Isurugi Hayato)
Voiced by: Junji Majima
A mechanic. He assists with the Synchro Fusion for the Drive Heads and Support Vehicles via remote-control.
Toshimichi Izawa (伊沢 利通, Izawa Toshimichi)
Voiced by: Nobuaki Kanemitsu
A mechanic. He provides support from inside the Transporter.
Eiko Anzai (安斉 映子, Anzai Eiko)
Voiced by: Ami Naitou
An operator.
Kanji Gozu (牛頭 寛治, Gozu Kanji)
Voiced by: Yutaka Aoyama
The Mobile Rescue Police chief. He has full authority over the Drive Head project.

=== Mobile Assault Police ===
Shun Kuroeda (黒江田 隼, Kuroeda Shun)
Voiced by: Takahiro Mizushima
A young man who is the driver of the S.I.B. Max. He is a rare prodigy. He was initially pursuing the wanted criminal, Dr. Karigari. He later begins to investigate the Black Chips and the mysterious android, TF-3. He knows the identities of the other drivers, and takes an interest in them because of their courage. He has cooperated with them during various major disasters and incidents. During the events of the movie, he becomes the driver of a new unit, the C.I.B. Max. He is forced to destroy the S.I.B. Max, which was taken over by Terra.

=== Others ===
Kasumi Haruno (春野 かすみ, Haruno Kasumi)
Voiced by: Emiri Iwai
The school idol of Takatomi Elementary, which Gō and the other drivers attend. She ridicules Gō for his behavior, such as frequently leaving class for bathroom breaks (which is actually an excuse so he can launch). She admires the driver of Sonic Interceptor, but believes him to be someone tall and handsome and doesn't realize that it's Gō. On one occasion, because some functions at the Mobile Rescue Police headquarters weren't working properly, she accidentally entered the base through the shooter in the school gym, while following Gō. Although Kasumi hoped she could meet the driver of Interceptor, she passed out due to being sick, and was later told that the incident was a dream, although she still believed it was real. This is helped by the fact that she met the dog Axel both inside and outside of the base.
Honda Sensei (本田先生, Honda Sensei)
Voiced by: Marie Ooi
Gō's homeroom teacher. She doesn't know that Gō and the others are drivers.
Yuri Sasagawa (笹川 友里, Sasagawa Yuri)
Voiced by: Yuri Sasagawa (TBS Announcer)
An announcer who works for the station Akasaka TV (abbreviated as AKTV.) She is modeled after a real-life TV announcer, but is a fictionalized version. She is a huge fan of Drive Head who always arrives first at the scene of a disaster to report on their actions, and hosts various other TV programs. She has faith in Dr. Karigari, who is a wanted criminal but has saved her life.
Fritz von Gustav Karigari (刈狩・フリッツフォン・グスタフ, Karigari Furittsu fon Gusutafu)/ Dr. Karigari (刈狩博士, Karigari Hakase)
Voiced by: Kouji Ishii
A mad scientist who is a self-proclaimed "Genius Scientist". He has a deep amount of self-pride. Along with his subordinates Yūsuke and Akira, he instigates various disasters and incidents against the Mobile Rescue Police. He has a one-sided rivalry with Jō Kurumada and Takahito Saionji, because in the past he once developed a robot for disaster aide, but his project was rejected in favor of the Drive Head project due to safety issues. Although he is obsessed with revenge he doesn't believe in harming outsiders. He is a passionate fan of Sasagawa, loves to watch her Fortune Corner and has saved her from danger. He later opposes the Evil AI and assists the Mobile Rescue Police, using a machine equipped with his personal driving system.
Yūsuke (ユウスケ, Yuusuke)
Voiced by: Tsukasa Saitou (of Trendy Angel)
A bank robber whom Gō arrests in the first episode. He is actually Dr. Karigari's faithful subordinate. He is a skilled Walker Vehicle driver.
Akira (アキラ, Akira)
Voiced by: Takashi (of Trendy Angel)
A bank robber whom Gō arrests in the first episode. He is actually Dr. Karigari's faithful subordinate. He adores his "bro", Yūsuke.
The Evil AI/Terra (邪悪AI/テラ, Jaaku Ei Ai/Tera)
Voiced by: Maaya Uchida (child), Kentarō Itō (adult).
A mysterious AI that lurks in various computers. It creates all sorts of disasters. When it invades a machine, the shape of an eyeball appears on-screen. It also causes disasters using Black Chips. Not only can it influence machines, but human emotions, as proven when it caused Isurugi and Izawa to rampage. Eventually, it begins to turn humans into metal. It is made of negative human emotions and capable of self-evolving. Its ultimate goal is to wipe out humanity. In the web series, it gains a new body. This body was originally a completely self-functioning android called TF-3, which was constructed for a terraforming project. The Evil AI took it over after being defeated in battle against the Drive Heads, and it took the name, "Terra". In the movie, it evolves again to an adult form, and attempts to restructure the earth in order to wipe out all life. It is finally defeated by Gō.
Hayato Hayasugi (速杉 ハヤト, Hayasugi Hayato)
Voiced by: Ayane Sakura
The protagonist of Shinkansen Henkei Robo Shinkalion.

=== Minor characters ===
Kenichi (ケンイチ, Kenichi)
Voiced by: Marie Ooi
Gō's friend.
Hiroaki (ヒロアキ, Hiroaki)
Voiced by: Misuzu Togashi
Gō's friend.
Azusa (アズサ, Azusa)
Voiced by: Ami Naitou
Kasumi's friend.
Nozomi (ノゾミ, Nozomi)
Voiced by: Saki Minami
Kasumi's friend.
Harrisen Ford (ハリセンフォード, Harisen Fuoodo)
Voiced by: Takaki Ōtomari
An American movie director. He has many exotic pets.
Sala Manda (万田 サラ, Manda Sara)
Voiced by: Aimi Tanaka
An idol who wears a salamander suit. Although she keeps her real face a secret, Jin accidentally saw it when rescuing her from a disaster. She has been a fan of White Hope ever since this incident.
Maiko (マイコ, Maiko)
Voiced by: Marina Inoue
A thief who infiltrated a motor show. She stole a car with a self-driving AI called Idaten. Later, she copied Idaten for herself, who serves as a companion. Maiko unknowingly assisted the Evil AI in resurrecting, when she planted a Black Chip in the Mobile Rescue Police Headquarters in exchange for pay.
Idaten (韋駄天, Idaten)
Voiced by: Rikako Aikawa
The AI of a self-driving car. Idaten was developed by Mikoshiba. He becomes the partner of Maiko.
Mikoshiba (御子柴, Mikoshiba)
Voiced by: Kan Tanaka
Idaten's developer.
Kumiko Kurumada (車田 久美子, Kurumada Kumiko)
Voiced by: Megumi Toyoguchi
Mother of Gō and wife of Jō. She and her husband share a very affectionate relationship. She is aware of the identities of the drivers.
Sanae Munakata (宗像 沙南江, Munakata Sanae)
Voiced by: Miyako Itō
Arisa's grandmother.
Risa Unai (宇内 梨沙, Unai Risa)
Voiced by: Risa Unai (TBS Announcer)
An announcer who works for Akasaka TV. She is Sasagawa's junior, who serves as a pinch hitter. Like Sasagawa, she is modeled off of a real-life announcer.

== Mecha ==
=== Drive Heads ===
Drive Head 01 Sonic Interceptor (ドライブヘッド01（ゼロワン） ソニックインターセプター, Doraibuheddo Zero Wan Sonikku Intaaseputa)
Driven by Gō Kurumada. Debuts in episode 1. It has a police car motif.
Synchro Fusions- Sonic Interceptor Jet Burnern (Fusion with Sonic Jet)
Drive Head 01 Mk-II Cyclone Interceptor (ドライブヘッド01MKII（ゼロワン マークツー） サイクロンインターセプター, Doraibuheddo Zero Wan Maaku Tsuu Saikuron Intaaseputaa)
Driven by Gō Kurumada. Debuts in episode 13. It has a police car motif.
Synchro Fusions- Cyclone Interceptor Mach Shooting Star (Fusion with Blitz Formula), Cyclone Interceptor Jet Striker (Fusion with Blitz Jet Fighter)
Drive Head 02 Rescue Backdraft (ドライブヘッド02（ゼロツー） レスキューバックドラフト, Doraibuheddo Zero Tsuu Resukyuu Bakkudorafuto)
Driven by Taiga Yagura. Debuts in episode 3. It has a fire truck motif.
Synchro Fusions- Rescue Backdraft Booster Cannon (Fusion with Fire Truck), Rescue Backdraft Heavy Blade Stronger (Fusion with Rescue Bull Chainsaw)
Drive Head 02 Mk-II Brave Backdraft (ドライブヘッド02MKII（ゼロツー マークツー） ブレイブバックドラフト, Doraibuheddo Zero Tsuu Maaku Tsuu Bureibu Bakkudorafuto)
Driven by Taiga Yagura. Debuts in episode 23. It has a fire truck motif.
Synchro Fusions- Brave Backdraft Rescue Commander (Fusion with Transporter Gaia)
Drive Head 02 Mk-III Master Backdraft (ドライブヘッド02MKIII（ゼロツー マークスリー） マスターバックドラフト, Doraibuheddo Zero Tsuu Maaku Surii Masutaa Bakkudorafuto)
Driven by Taiga Yagura. Debuts in episode 3 of the ONA. It has a fire truck motif.
Synchro Fusions- Master Backdraft Jet Striker (Fusion with Brave Jet Fighter)
Drive Head 03 White Hope (ドライブヘッド03（ゼロスリー） ホワイトホープ, Doraibuheddo Zero Surii Howaito Hoopu)
Driven by Jin and Mikoto Ishino. Debuts in episode 3. It has an ambulance motif. White Hope has two separate Vipers, and its appearance differs based on which driver is inside.
Synchro Fusions- White Hope Thruster Emperor (Fusion with Rescue Helicopter), White Hope Heavy Blade Stronger (Fusion with Rescue Bull Chainsaw)
Drive Head 03 Mk-II White Crystal Hope (ドライブヘッド03MKII（ゼロスリー マークツー） ホワイトクリスタルホープ, Doraibuheddo Zero Surii Maaku Tsuu Howaito Kurisutaru Hoopu)
Driven by Jin and Mikoto Ishino. Debuts in episode 22. It has an ambulance motif. During the ONA, Jin becomes its sole driver.
Synchro Fusions- White Crystal Hope Rescue Commander (Fusion with Transporter Gaia)
Drive Head 03 Mk-II White Pearl Hope (ドライブヘッド03MKII（ゼロスリー マークツー） ホワイトパールホープ, Doraibuheddo Zero Surii Maaku Tsuu Howaito Paaru Hoopu)
Driven by Mikoto Ishino. Debuts in episode 6 of the ONA. It has an ambulance motif.
Synchro Fusions- White Pearl Hope Armored Emperor (Fusion with Rescue Active Offroader), White Pearl Hope Armored Thruster Emperor (Fusion with Rescue Active Offroader and Rescue Helicopter)
Drive Head Sonic Interceptor Black Max (S.I.B. Max) (ドライブヘッド S.I.B.MAX（エス・アイ・ビー・マックス、ソニックインターセプターブラックマックス）, Doraibuheddo Esu Ai Bii Makkusu/Sonikku Intaaseputa Burakku Makkusu)
Driven by Shun Kuroeda. Debuts in episode 19. A black variant of Sonic Interceptor. It belongs to the Mobile Assault Police.
Synchro Fusions- S.I.B. Mega Max (Fusion with Sonic Jet Eagle and Sonic Doberman John)
Drive Head 0 Mk-II Cyclone Interceptor Black Max (C.I.B. Max) (ドライブヘッド 0 MKII（ゼロ マークツー）C.I.B.MAX（シー・アイ・ビー・マックス、サイクロンインターセプターブラックマックス）, Doraibuheddo Shii Ai Bii Makkusu/Saikuron Intaaseputa Burakku Makkusu)
Driven by Shun Kuroeda. Debuts in the movie. A black variant of Cyclone Interceptor. It belongs to the Mobile Assault Police.
Fake Drive Head 01
A fake Drive Head largely based on Sonic Interceptor, created by the Evil AI.
Fake Drive Head 02
A fake Drive Head largely based on Rescue Backdraft, created by the Evil AI.
Fake Drive Head 03
A fake Drive Head largely based on Mikoto's White Hope, originally created by the Evil AI. Karigari customized it with his own system and drives it. This custom version is only used in the final episode. It has no official name.

=== Support vehicles ===
Sonic Jet (ソニックジェット, Soniku Jietto)
Fire Truck (ファイヤートラック, Faiyaa Torakku)
Rescue Helicopter (レスキューヘリコプター, Resukyuu Herikoputaa)
Rescue Bull Chainsaw (レスキューブルチェーンソー, Resukyuu Buru Chieensoo)
Blitz Formula (ブリッツフォーミュラ, Burittsu Fuoomyura)
Blitz Jet Fighter (ブリッツジェットファイター, Burittsu Jietto Fuaitaa)
Transporter (トランスポーター, Toransupootaa)
Transporter Gaia (トランスポーターガイア, Toransupootaa Gaia)
Brave Jet Fighter (ブレイブジェットファイター, Bureibu Jietto Fuaitaa)
Rescue Active Offroader (レスキューアクティブオフローダー, Resukyuu Akuteibu Ofuroodaa)
Active Offroader (アクティブオフローダー, Akuteibu Ofuroodaa)
Sonic Jet Eagle (ソニックジェット・イーグル, Soniku Jietto Iigeru)
Sonic Doberman John (ソニックドーベルマン・ジョン, Soniku Dooberuman Jyon)

== Media ==
=== Anime ===
Drive Head's TV anime ran for 37 episodes. It was followed up by a monthly web-series, with shorter-length episodes, beginning January 20, 2018. Following the web series is an anime film in August 2018.

==== List of episodes ====
No.	Title	Script	Storyboard	Episode Director	Animation Director	Original Airdate
1	There's an Incident! Go Rescue!!	Kenichi Araki	Takao Kato	Seung Hui Son	Takumo Norita	April 15, 2017
2	The Birth of Drive Head 01!!	Kenichi Araki	Jun Takahashi		Yoshiya Yamamoto	April 22, 2017
3	Its Name is Rescue Backdraft!!	Hiroaki Kitajima	Tsuneo Tominaga		Fumio Matsumoto	April 29, 2017
4	Fly Away! Synchro Fusion!!	Katsuhiko Chiba	Kaito Asakura	Naoki Oohira	Hidetsugu Hirayama	May 6, 2017
5	Overcome the Storm! White Hope!!	Naoko Marukawa	Hitoyuki Matsui	Yasuro Tsuchiya	Sōma Watanabe	May 13, 2017
6	The Red Guy's Burning Fusion!!	Masaharu Amiya	Jun Kamiya	Masayuki Iimura	Shinichi Suzuki	May 20, 2017
7	The Drive Head Couldn't Launch!!	Kenichi Araki	Taichi Atarashi	Akiko Seki	Ayako Mori, Naoko Ikeuchi	May 27, 2017
8	Sigh, Being a Driver Sure is Tough	Hiroaki Kitajima	Tsuneo Tominaga		Fumio Matsumoto	June 3, 2017
9	Rescue Backdraft who Disappeared in Magma!!	Masaharu Amiya	Jun Takahashi		Maiko Okada, Chika Kojima	June 10, 2017
10	Dash Forward, Sonic Interceptor!!	Katsuhiko Chiba	Yasuro Tsuchiya	Hitoyuki Matsui	Sōma Watanabe	June 17, 2017
11	The Disaster Scientist is Back!!	Kenichi Araki	Yui Umemoto		Yoshiya Yamamoto	June 24, 2017
12	Inspection! Drive Head's Secret!!	Kensaku Sakai	Takao Kato		Takumo Norita	July 1, 2017
13	Sortie! Cyclone Interceptor!!	Hiroaki Kitajima	Hiroaki Nishimura		Ichizō Kobayashi	July 8, 2017
14	Snipe! The AM516 Magnum!	Masaharu Amiya	Naoki Oohira		Hidetsugu Hirayama	July 15, 2017
15	It's Complete! Heavy Blade Stronger!!	Katsuhiko Chiba	Tsuneo Tominaga		Fumio Matsumoto	July 22, 2017
16	Legend of the Galactic Kong	Katsuhiko Chiba	Jun Kamiya	Jun Takahashi	Chika Kojima, Yoshiya Yamamoto	July 29, 2017
17	Stop the Giant Ferris Wheel!!	Kensaku Saka	Kaito Asakura	Hiroyuki Yokoyama	Miori Nomura, Katsumi Hashimoto	August 5, 2017
18	Super Speed! Mach Shooting Star!!	Kenichi Araki	Hitoyuki Matsui	Yasuro Tsuchiya	Sōma Watanabe	August 12, 2017
19	Jet Black Drive Head!!	Kenichi Araki	Jun Takahashi		Yoshiya Yamamoto, Chika Kojima	August 19, 2017
20	Stop the Dam from Bursting!!	Naoko Marukawa	Hiroaki Nishimura		Hisashi Mitsui, Kenji Hattori, Kenji Aoyagi	August 26, 2017
21	Kasumi-chan SOS!!	Masaharu Amiya	Kaito Asakura	Yoshito Hata	Hideaki Shimada, Tamaki Kanbe, Keizō Shimizu, Yuko Kiyoshima, Yukari Kobayashi, Ippei Masui, Duk Ho Lee	September 2, 2017
22	Black Scheme! The Black Chip!!	Katsuhiko Chiba	Tsuneo Tominaga		Fumio Matsumoto	September 9, 2017
23	Flame Hero! Brave Backdraft!!	Hiroaki Kitajima	Akiko Seki		Naoko Ikeuchi, Ayako Mori	September 16, 2017
24	The Disaster Scientist's Day Off	Kenichi Araki	Kentarō Fujita		Shiori Kobayashi, Kenji Aoyagi	September 23, 2017
25	Jet Striker of the Stormy Sea!!	Katsuhiko Chiba	Naoki Oohira		Hidetsugu Hirayama	September 30, 2017
26	My Boyfriend is Crystal Hope!	Naoko Marukawa	Takao Kato	Tatsunari Oyano	Seiji Kishimoto, Taeko Hori, Takumo Norita, Chizuru Kobayashi	October 7, 2017
27	Emergency Launch! Transporter Gaia!!	Masaharu Amiya	Tsuneo Tominaga		Fumio Matsumoto	October 14, 2017
28	Entrance! Rescue Commander!!	Hiroaki Kitajima	Jun Takahash		Chika Kojima, Shigenori Kurii	October 21, 2017
29	Dad is the Chief Engineer!!	Kensaku Sakai	Taichi Atarashi	Masayuki Iimura	Yukari Kobayashi	October 28, 2017
30	Welcome to the Mobile Rescue Police	Kensaku Sakai	Takao Kato		Takumo Norita	November 4, 2017
31	The Evil Eye is Approaching	Kenichi Araki	Hiroaki Nishimura		Kenji Aoyagi, Shiori Kobayashi, Etsushi Mori	November 11, 2017
32	Secret of the Drive Gear	Kenichi Araki	Akiko Seki		Naoko Ikeuchi, Ayako Mori	November 18, 2017
33	Kasumi in Wonder-Base	Katsuhiko Chiba	Taichi Atarashi	Hiroyuki Yokoyam	Miori Nomura, Katsumi Hashimoto	November 25, 2017
34	Renegade! Transporter Gaia!!	Masaharu Amiya	Jun Takahashi	Masashi Abe	Kazuyuki Ikai, Hiroshi Numata	December 2, 2017
35	Drive Head! Attack!!	Naoko Marukawa	Naoki Oohira		Hidetsugu Hirayama, Chika Kojima	December 9, 2017
36	Evil Identity	Kenichi Araki	Tsuneo Tominaga	Kentarō Fujita	Kenji Aoyagi, Akira Koremoto, Yuna Naeki	December 16, 2017
37	Team Drive Head! Go Rescue!	Kenichi Araki	Takao Kato	Tatsunari Oyano	Takumo Norita, Chizuru Kobayashi, Seiji Kishimoto	December 23, 2017
Drive Head 2018						Original Release date
1	Activate! A New Drive Head Plan!!	-				January 20, 2018
2	New Potential! Drive Head 02 Mk-III is Developed!!	-				February 17, 2018
3	It's Complete! Master Backdraft!!	Kenichi Araki	Takao Kato	Jun Takahashi	Chika Kojima, Kanako Watanabe	March 17, 2018
4	Flame Hero who Flies in the Sky! Brave Jet Fighter!!	Kenichi Araki	Takao Kato	Kazuya Fujishiro	Takumo Norita, Chizuru Kobayashi	April 21, 2018
5	Take Off! Plan for the 4th Drive Head!!	-				May 19, 2018
6	White Savior! White Pearl Hope!!	Kenichi Araki	Takao Kato	Kazuya Fujishiro	Takumo Norita, Chizuru Kobayashi	June 16, 2018
7	Synchro Fusion! Armored Emperor!!	Kenichi Araki	Naoki Oohira		Hidetsugu Hirayama	July 21, 2018
8	A Special Right Before the Film Opens	-				August 18, 2018

=== Music ===
Opening themes

- "Chatter-Rattle!" ((ワチャ-ガチャ!), "Wacha-Gacha!")
  - Performance: SUPER★DRAGON
  - Episodes: 1–25 and the web series
- "Help You" ((ヘルプ ユー), "Herupu Yuu")
  - Performance: Satori Boys Club
  - Episodes: 26–37

Ending themes

- "Worry-Free Hero" (悩めるヒーロー, "Nayameru Hiiroo")
  - Performance: SECRET GUYZ
  - Episodes: 1–12
- "Apology Rhythm" (あやまリズム, "Ayamarizumu")
  - Performance: Sakura Shimeji
  - Episodes: 13–25
- "My Friend" (マイ・フレンド, "Mai Furendo")
  - Performance: EBiSSH
  - Episodes: 26–37

Movie theme

- "Go!!!"
  - Performance: EBiSSH
