= Ayane Sakura =

Japanese voice actress

- 佐倉 綾音
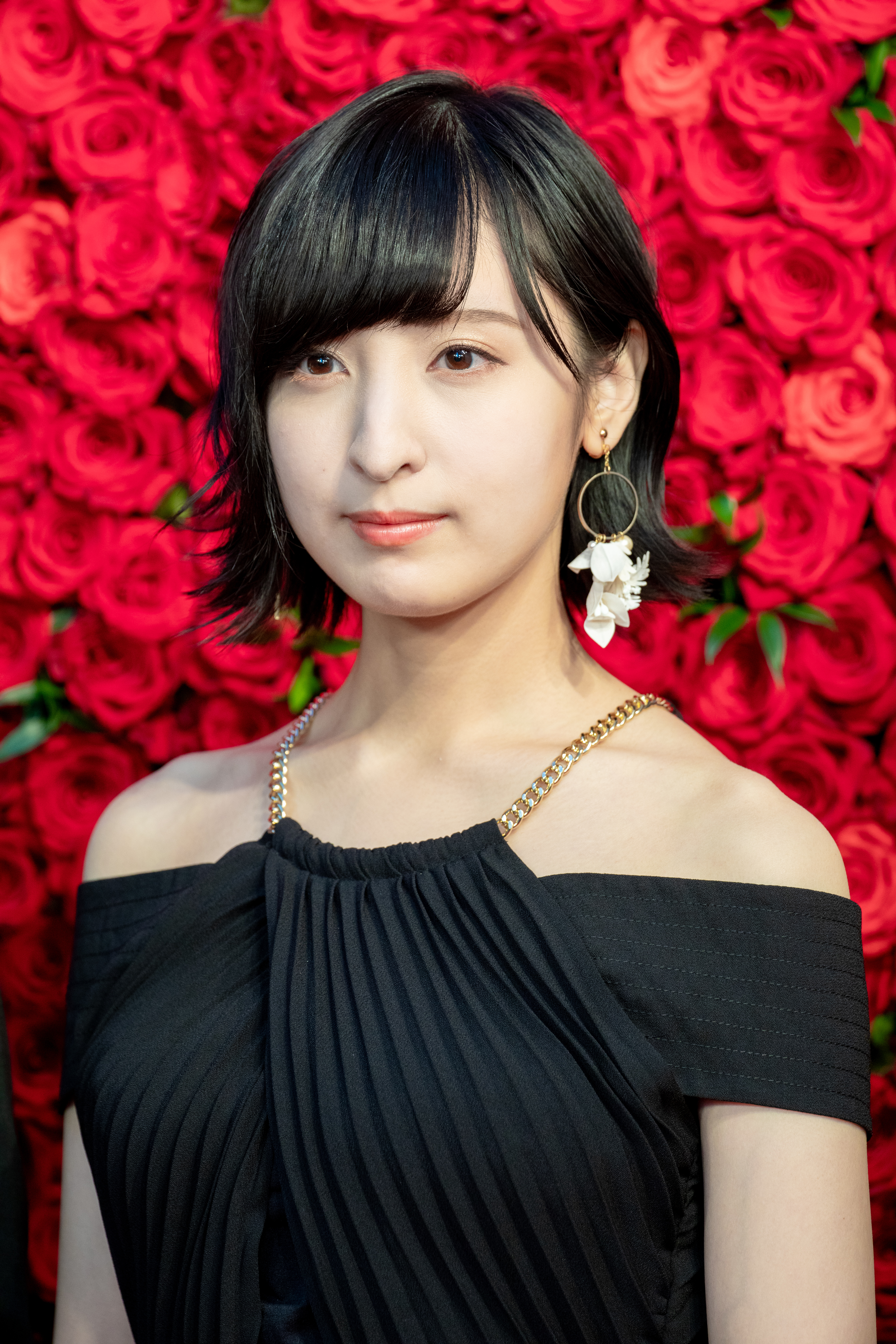
- Ayane Sakura at the Tokyo International Film Festival 2018
- Born: January 29, 1994 (age 32); Ebisu, Shibuya, Tokyo, Japan
- Other name: Ayaneru
- Occupation: Voice actress
- Years active: 2010–present
- Agent(s): I'm Enterprise (2010–2022); Aoni Production (2022–Present)
- Awards: 12th Seiyu Awards Personality Award

Ayane Sakura (佐倉 綾音, Sakura Ayane; born January 29, 1994) is a Japanese voice actress affiliated with Aoni Production. She won the Best Supporting Actress award at the 12th Seiyu Awards.

Her roles included Ren Saionji in MF Ghost, Natsumi Koshigaya in Non Non Biyori, Shiromi Iori in Blue Archive, Secre Swallowtail in Black Clover, Ochaco Uraraka in My Hero Academia, Tsubaki Sawabe in Your Lie in April, Iroha Isshiki in My Youth Romantic Comedy Is Wrong, As I Expected, Suzuka Dairenji in Tokyo Ravens, the Nagato, Sendai, Kuma, Tama and Shimakaze ships in Kantai Collection, Cocoa Hoto in Is the Order a Rabbit?, Ran Mitake in BanG Dream!, Clarisse in Granblue Fantasy, Yotsuba Nakano in The Quintessential Quintuplets, Hasuki Komai in Boarding School Juliet, Nao Tomori in Charlotte, Rinne in Pretty Rhythm: Rainbow Live and King of Prism, Yae Sakura in Honkai Impact 3rd, Prinz Eugen in Azur Lane, Gabi Braun in Attack on Titan: The Final Season, Ephnel in SoulWorker, Yae Miko in Genshin Impact, and Fiona Frost in Spy × Family. She has performed theme and character songs for each series other than MF Ghost.

== Biography ==
Sakura was born on January 29, 1994, in Ebisu, Shibuya, Tokyo, Japan. She had a desire in becoming an actress and decided to enroll in a theater acting school, during her junior high school years. At school, she studied Japanese dancing, stretching, sword fighting, voice training and acting, although she initially continued to pursue acting, after performing on stage, she realized that she "was different" and decided that acting was no longer a suitable career for her. At this point, she decided to become a voice actress.

Sakura made her voice acting debut in 2010, starring in Keroro Gunso the Super Movie: Creation! Ultimate Keroro, Wonder Space-Time Island, and playing Futaba Shirayuki in the ninth episode of the anime series Ōkami-san & her Seven Companions, as well as voicing background characters in the anime series Oreimo. In 2011, she voiced Merry Nightmare, the heroine of the anime series Dream Eater Merry, as well as the character Yozora Mikazuki in the anime series Haganai during flashbacks. She also performed the song "Yume to Kibō to Ashita no Atashi" (ユメとキボーとアシタのアタシ), which was used as the ending theme to Dream Eater Merry. In 2012, she voiced the character Miyabi Kannagi in Nakaimo - My Sister Is Among Them!, Marii Buratei in Joshiraku, and Ayami Ōruri in Pretty Rhythm: Dear My Future. She also performed the song "Heavenly Lover" together with the other cast members of Nakaimo, and the song "Oato ga Yoroshikutte...Yo!" (お後がよろしくって…よ!)" which she performed together with her Joshiraku co-stars; the song was used as the opening theme to Joshiraku.

In 2013, Sakura played Asuka Mishima in A Town Where You Live, Alisa Ayase in Love Live!, Yuiko Enomoto in Love Lab, Natsumi Koshigaya in Non Non Biyori, Akane Isshiki in Vividred Operation and Suzuka Dairenji in Tokyo Ravens. In 2014, she played the role of Cocoa Hoto in the anime series Is the Order a Rabbit?; she and her co-stars performed the series' opening theme "Daydream Cafe" as the group Petit Rabbit's. She also played Silvia Lautreamont in Dragonar Academy, Yuzuki Kurebayashi in Selector Infected WIXOSS, Levi Kazama in Trinity Seven and Tsubaki Sawabe in Your Lie in April. In 2015, Sakura reprised the role for the second season of Is the Order a Rabbit?; she and her co-stars performed the series' opening theme "No-Poi!". She voiced Nao Tomori in Charlotte, Iroha Isshiki in My Youth Romantic Comedy Is Wrong, As I Expected, Haru Onodera in Nisekoi, and Moa in Show by Rock!!. In 2016, Sakura played Ochaco Uraraka in My Hero Academia, Rena Asteria in Regalia: The Three Sacred Stars and Ryoka Narusawa in Occultic;Nine. In 2017, she played the roles of Hikari Tsuneki in Seiren, Phoena in Chain Chronicle, and Shizuku Hanaoka in Welcome to the Ballroom. Sakura shared the Best Supporting Actress Award at the 12th Seiyu Awards with Saori Ōnishi. In 2018, she played the roles of Yū Ōsawa in Ms. Koizumi Loves Ramen Noodles and Saiko Yonebayashi in Tokyo Ghoul:re. In 2019, she played Yotsuba Nakano in The Quintessential Quintuplets.

On January 31, 2022, Sakura announced that she has left her talent agency I'm Enterprise. The following day, Aoni Production announced that she has joined their agency.

== Filmography ==
=== Live-action ===
| Year | Title | Role | Notes |
|---|---|---|---|
| 2023 | Ohsama Sentai King-Ohger Adventure Heaven | Devonica | |
| 2024 | Ohsama Sentai King-Ohger | Devonica | Episode 49 |

=== Anime series ===
| Year | Title | Role | Notes |
|---|---|---|---|
| 2010 | Okami-san and Her Seven Companions | Futaba Shirayuki | Episode 9 |
| 2010 | Oreimo | Electric little sister (Ep 4), Mikoto (Ep. 5), Kirara Hoshino | |
| 2011 | Anohana: The Flower We Saw That Day | Sales clerk | |
| 2011 | Ben-To | Female student A | |
| 2011 | Dream Eater Merry | Merry Nightmare | |
| 2011 | Haganai | Sora/Yozora Mikazuki (young), Schoolgirl, Schoolgirl A | |
| 2011 | Jewelpet Sunshine | Natchi | Episode 29 |
| 2011 | Puella Magi Madoka Magica | Girl, Female student | |
| 2011 | Ro-Kyu-Bu! | Hijiri Kuina | |
| 2011 | Sacred Seven | Ayane | |
| 2011 | Sket Dance | Reality Maji (Ep. 8), Schoolgirl | |
| 2011 | Wandering Son | Isawa, Nagasawa, Female student A | |
| 2012 | Bakuman. 3 | Saeki | |
| 2012 | Campione! | Female student A | |
| 2012 | Nogizaka Haruka no Himitsu: Finale | Student of Seijukan School | |
| 2012 | Chōyaku Hyakunin isshu: Uta Koi | Akiko Nakamiya | |
| 2012 | Joshiraku | Marī Buratei | |
| 2012 | Kokoro Connect | Anzu Kiriyama | |
| 2012 | Listen to Me, Girls. I Am Your Father! | Luna Noir | Episodes 5 and 10 |
| 2012 | Mobile Suit Gundam AGE | Remi Ruth | |
| 2012 | Muv-Luv Alternative: Total Eclipse | Giselle Adjani | |
| 2012 | Nakaimo - My Sister Is Among Them! | Miyabi Kannagi | |
| 2012 | Pretty Rhythm: Dear My Future | Ayami Ōruri | |
| 2012 | Psycho-Pass | Mika Shimotsuki | |
| 2012 | The Pet Girl of Sakurasou | Research student B | |
| 2012 | Tari Tari | Nao Ise | |
| 2013 | A Town Where You Live | Asuka Mishima | |
| 2013 | Aiura | Mei Yanase | |
| 2013 | Battle Spirits: Sword Eyes | Boy, Konoha, Ragā | |
| 2013 | Beyond the Boundary | Nase Hiroomi (Young) | |
| 2013 | Day Break Illusion | Fuyuna Shinzaki | |
| 2013 | Haganai NEXT | Sora/Yozora Mikazuki (young) | |
| 2013 | High School DxD New | Gasper Vladi | |
| 2013 | Infinite Stratos 2 | Chloe Chronicle | |
| 2013 | Love Lab | Yuiko "Eno" Enomoto | |
| 2013 | Love Live! | Alisa Ayase | |
| 2013 | Non Non Biyori | Natsumi Koshigaya | |
| 2013 | Pretty Rhythm: Rainbow Live | Rinne | |
| 2013 | Ro-Kyu-Bu! SS | Hijiri Kuina | |
| 2013 | The Eccentric Family | Kaisei Ebisugawa | |
| 2013 | Tokyo Ravens | Suzuka Dairenji | |
| 2013 | Vividred Operation | Akane Isshiki | |
| 2014 | Bladedance of Elementalers | Velsaria Fahrengart | |
| 2014 | Brynhildr in the Darkness | Chie | |
| 2014 | Dragonar Academy | Silvia Lautreamont | |
| 2014 | Engaged to the Unidentified | Nadeshiko Kashima | |
| 2014 | Girl Friend Beta | Kazuha Kumada | |
| 2014 | Himegoto | Mitsunaga Oda | |
| 2014 | Is the Order a Rabbit? | Cocoa Hoto | |
| 2014 | Knights of Sidonia | Mozuku Kunato, Nurse, Female announcer, Air traffic controllers | |
| 2014 | Love Live! 2nd Season | Alisa Ayase | |
| 2014 | Monthly Girls' Nozaki-kun | Asuka | |
| 2014 | Psycho-Pass 2 | Mika Shimotsuki | |
| 2014 | Selector Infected WIXOSS | Yuzuki Kurebayashi | |
| 2014 | Selector Spread WIXOSS | Yuzuki Kurebayashi | |
| 2014 | Terra Formars | Eva Frost | |
| 2014 | Trinity Seven | Levi Kazama | |
| 2014 | Your Lie in April | Tsubaki Sawabe | |
| 2014 | Z/X Ignition | Type II | |
| 2015 | Aquarion Logos | Maia Tsukigane | |
| 2015 | Aria the Scarlet Ammo AA | Akari Mamiya | |
| 2015 | Battle Spirits: Burning Soul | Munenori Hiiragi | |
| 2015 | Charlotte | Nao Tomori | |
| 2015 | High School DxD BorN | Gasper Vladi | |
| 2015 | Is the Order a Rabbit?? | Cocoa Hoto | |
| 2015 | I Can't Understand What My Husband Is Saying | Akiko Toshiura | |
| 2015 | Knights of Sidonia: Battle for Planet Nine | Mozuku Kunato | |
| 2015 | Kantai Collection | Nagato-class, Sendai-class, Kuma, Tama, Shimakaze | |
| 2015 | Miritari! | Second Lieutenant Haruka | |
| 2015 | My Teen Romantic Comedy SNAFU TOO! | Iroha Isshiki | |
| 2015 | Nisekoi | Haru Onodera | |
| 2015 | Non Non Biyori Repeat | Natsumi Koshigaya | |
| 2015 | Overlord | Solution Epsilon | |
| 2015 | Seiyu's Life! | Sayo-chan | |
| 2015 | Show by Rock!! | Moa | |
| 2015 | Ultimate Otaku Teacher | Sachiko Tanaka/Kisaki Tenjōin | |
| 2015 | Unlimited Fafnir | Tear Lightning | |
| 2015 | Utawarerumono: Mask of Deception | Ululu, Sarana | |
| 2015 | World Break: Aria of Curse for a Holy Swordsman | Katya Eschvna Honda | |
| 2016 | Ange Vierge | Eins Exaura | |
| 2016 | Battle Spirits: Double Drive | Kiki Beresia | |
| 2016 | Concrete Revolutio ~Chojin Genso~ THE LAST SONG | Debiro | |
| 2016 | Days | Sayuri Tachibana | |
| 2016 | Flying Witch | Kenny | |
| 2016 | Gate 2nd Season | Giselle | |
| 2016 | Girlish Number | Maimai-chan | |
| 2016 | Lostorage incited WIXOSS | Yuzuki Kurebayashi | |
| 2016 | Magical Girl Raising Project | La Pucelle / Souta Kishibe | |
| 2016 | My Hero Academia | Ochaco Uraraka / Reiko Yanagi | |
| 2016 | Occultic;Nine | Ryoka Narusawa | |
| 2016 | Orange | Rio Ueda | |
| 2016 | PJ Berri no Mogu Mogu Munya Munya | Sunny Funny | |
| 2016 | Ragnastrike Angels | Nagisa Nanami | |
| 2016 | RS Project -Rebirth Storage- | Kaori Shimizu | |
| 2016 | Regalia: The Three Sacred Stars | Rena Asteria | |
| 2016 | Shounen Ashibe Go! Go! Goma-chan | Yuma-kun, Sugao's mom, Anzai-sensei | |
| 2016 | Show by Rock!! Short!! | Moa | |
| 2016 | Show by Rock!!# | Moa | |
| 2016 | This Art Club Has a Problem! | Magical Ribbon | |
| 2016 | ViVid Strike! | Jill Stola | |
| 2017 | Atom: The Beginning | Ochanomizu Ran | |
| 2017 | Battle Girl High School | Subaru Wakaba | |
| 2017 | Classroom of the Elite | Masumi Kamuro | |
| 2017 | Doraemon | Titi (Doraemon 2017 Birthday Special) | |
| 2017 | Land of the Lustrous | Bort | |
| 2017 | My Hero Academia 2nd Season | Ochaco Uraraka | |
| 2017 | Juni Taisen: Zodiac War | Niwatori | |
| 2017 | Seiren | Hikari Tsuneki | |
| 2017 | Tsuredure Children | Ryoko Kaji | |
| 2017 | Welcome to the Ballroom | Shizuku Hanaoka | |
| 2018 | Alice or Alice | Rise | |
| 2018 | BanG Dream! Girls Band Party! Pico | Ran Mitake | |
| 2018 | Boarding School Juliet | Hasuki Komai | |
| 2018 | Shinkansen Henkei Robo Shinkalion | Hayato Hatasugi | |
| 2018 | Darling in the Franxx | Nine Delta | |
| 2018 | High School DxD Hero | Gasper Vladi | |
| 2018 | Lostorage conflated WIXOSS | Yuzuki Kurebayashi | |
| 2018 | Million Arthur | Thief Arthur | Episode 10 |
| 2018 | Miss Caretaker of Sunohara-sou | Nana Sunohara | |
| 2018 | Ms. Koizumi Loves Ramen Noodles | Yū Ōsawa | |
| 2018 | My Hero Academia 3rd Season | Ochaco Uraraka | |
| 2018 | Ninja Girl & Samurai Master 3rd Season | Nyoshunni | |
| 2018 | Overlord II | Solution Epsilon | |
| 2018 | Overlord III | Solution Epsilon | |
| 2018 | Radiant | Lieselotte | |
| 2018 | The Ryuo's Work Is Never Done! | Ai Yashajin | |
| 2018 | Tokyo Ghoul:re | Saiko Yonebayashi | |
| 2019 | Ace of Diamond: Act II | Yoshikawa Haruno | |
| 2019 | Afterlost | Suzuna | |
| 2019 | Assassins Pride | Nerva Martillo | |
| 2019 | BanG Dream! 2nd Season | Ran Mitake | |
| 2019 | Carole & Tuesday | Cybelle | |
| 2019 | Kono Oto Tomare! Sounds of Life | Kazusa Ōtori | |
| 2019 | My Hero Academia 4th Season | Ochaco Uraraka | |
| 2019 | Psycho-Pass 3 | Mika Shimotsuki | |
| 2019 | The Helpful Fox Senko-san | Yasuko Koenji | |
| 2019 | The Quintessential Quintuplets | Yotsuba Nakano | |
| 2020 | Attack on Titan: The Final Season | Gabi Braun | |
| 2020 | BanG Dream! 3rd Season | Ran Mitake | |
| 2020 | BanG Dream! Girls Band Party! Pico: Ohmori | Ran Mitake | |
| 2020 | Black Clover | Secre Swallowtail | |
| 2020 | Drifting Dragons | Katja | |
| 2020 | ID: Invaded | Nahoshi Inami | |
| 2020 | Is the Order a Rabbit? BLOOM | Cocoa Hoto | |
| 2020 | Kakushigoto | Ami Kakei | |
| 2020 | Lapis Re:Lights | Yuzuriha | |
| 2020 | Magia Record: Puella Magi Madoka Magica Side Story | Felicia Mitsuki | |
| 2020 | My Teen Romantic Comedy SNAFU Climax | Iroha Isshiki | |
| 2020 | Sakura Wars the Animation | Sakura Amamiya | |
| 2020 | Sleepy Princess in the Demon Castle | Aladdif | |
| 2020 | The Day I Became a God | Hina Sato | |
| 2020 | The God of High School | Park Seungah | |
| 2020 | Uchitama?! Have you seen my Tama? | Emi Hanasaki | |
| 2021 | Azur Lane: Slow Ahead! | Prinz Eugen | |
| 2021 | Backflip!! | Asawo Kurikoma | |
| 2021 | BanG Dream! Girls Band Party! Pico Fever! | Ran Mitake | |
| 2021 | Girlfriend, Girlfriend | Saki Saki | |
| 2021 | Magia Record: Puella Magi Madoka Magica Side Story - Eve of Awakening | Felicia Mitsuki | |
| 2021 | Mieruko-chan | Yulia Niguredō | |
| 2021 | My Hero Academia 5th Season | Ochaco Uraraka | |
| 2021 | Non Non Biyori Nonstop | Natsumi Koshigaya | |
| 2021 | Osamake | Shirokusa Kachi | |
| 2021 | The Quintessential Quintuplets 2nd Season | Yotsuba Nakano | |
| 2021 | Shadows House | Louise / Lou | |
| 2021 | Show by Rock!! Stars!! | Moa | |
| 2021 | Tsukimichi: Moonlit Fantasy | Tomoe | |
| 2022 | Arknights: Prelude to Dawn | Nearl | |
| 2022 | Do It Yourself!! | Kurei | |
| 2022 | Don't Hurt Me, My Healer! | Thief | |
| 2022 | Heroines Run the Show | Juri Hattori | |
| 2022 | Legend of Mana: The Teardrop Crystal | Esmeralda | |
| 2022 | Love After World Domination | Anna Hōjō | |
| 2022 | Magia Record: Puella Magi Madoka Magica Side Story - Dawn of a Shallow Dream | Felicia Mitsuki | |
| 2022 | Princess Connect! Re:Dive Season 2 | Chieru | |
| 2022 | Shadows House 2nd Season | Louise / Lou | |
| 2022 | She Professed Herself Pupil of the Wise Man | Amaratte | |
| 2022 | My Hero Academia 6th Season | Ochaco Uraraka | |
| 2022 | Spy × Family | Fiona Frost | |
| 2022 | The Little Lies We All Tell | Sekine | |
| 2022 | Trapped in a Dating Sim: The World of Otome Games Is Tough for Mobs | Marie Fou Lafan | |
| 2022 | Utawarerumono: Mask of Truth | Uruuru, Saraana | |
| 2023 | Firefighter Daigo: Rescuer in Orange | Yuki Nakamura | |
| 2023 | KamiErabi God.app | Lall | |
| 2023 | MF Ghost | Ren Saionji | |
| 2023 | My Happy Marriage | Kaya Saimori | |
| 2023 | Pokémon Horizons: The Series | Orio | |
| 2023 | Spy Classroom | Sara | |
| 2023 | The Ice Guy and His Cool Female Colleague | Otonashi-san | |
| 2024 | Blue Archive the Animation | Iori Shiromi | |
| 2024 | Dandadan | Aira Shiratori | |
| 2024 | Grendizer U | Naida Baron | |
| 2024 | Hokkaido Gals Are Super Adorable! | Minami Fuyuki | |
| 2024 | My Hero Academia 7th Season | Ochaco Uraraka | |
| 2024 | Oshi no Ko 2nd Season | Abiko Samejima | |
| 2024 | Ranma ½ | Kodachi Kunō | |
| 2024 | The Foolish Angel Dances with the Devil | Lily Amane | |
| 2024 | Tsukimichi: Moonlit Fantasy 2nd Season | Tomoe | |
| 2024 | VTuber Legend: How I Went Viral After Forgetting to Turn Off My Stream | Awayuki Kokorone | |
| 2025 | Ameku M.D.: Doctor Detective | Takao Ameku | |
| 2025 | Bad Girl | Marimo Nishikawa | |
| 2025 | #Compass 2.0: Combat Providence Analysis System | Meg Meg | |
| 2025 | Farmagia | Arche | |
| 2025 | Gnosia | Comet | |
| 2025 | Kamitsubaki City Under Construction | Laplus | |
| 2025 | Let's Play | Angela O'Neill | |
| 2025 | Sakamoto Days | Lu Shaotang | |
| 2025 | Si-Vis: The Sound of Heroes | Siren | |
| 2025 | To Be Hero X | Loli | |
| 2026 | Magic Knight Rayearth | Hikaru Shidou | |
| 2026 | Petals of Reincarnation | John V. Neumann | |

=== Original net animation ===
| Year | Title | Role |
|---|---|---|
| 2014 | Bonjour♪Sweet Love Patisserie | Ran Mochizuki |
| 2014 | Shinra Banshō Choco | Arcana |
| 2014 | Pretty Guardian Sailor Moon Crystal Season I | Mii |
| 2015 | Overlord: Purepure Pleiades | Solution Epsilon |
| 2015 | Jaku-San-Sei Million Arthur | Thief Arthur |
| 2018 | Sword Gai | Midoriko |
| 2019 | Blade of the Immortal -Immortal- | Rin Asano |
| 2019 | Levius | Natalia Garnet |
| 2021 | Vlad Love | Mitsugu Bamba |
| 2022 | Ultraman Season 2 | Maya |
| 2023 | Tonikawa: Over the Moon for You – High School Days | Kaguya Gekkō |
| 2023 | My Daemon | Kaede |
| 2025 | Koisuru One Piece | Nami Koyama |

=== Original video animation ===
| Year | Title | Role |
|---|---|---|
| 2014 | Chain Chronicle: Short Animation | Phoena |
| 2015 | Pokémon: Hoopa, The Mischief of Pokémon | Meary |
| 2018 | Kase-san and Morning Glories | Tomoka Kase |

=== Anime films ===
| Year | Title | Role | Other notes |
|---|---|---|---|
| 2010 | Keroro Gunso the Super Movie: Creation! Ultimate Keroro, Wonder Space-Time Island | | voice acting debut |
| 2011 | Hotarubi no Mori e | Hotaru Takegawa | |
| 2013 | A Certain Magical Index: The Movie – The Miracle of Endymion | Ladylee Tangleroad | |
| 2014 | Pretty Rhythm All-Star Selection: Prism Show Best Ten | Rinne, Ayami Ōruri | |
| 2015 | Knights of Sidonia | Mozuku Kunato | |
| 2015 | Love Live! The School Idol Movie | Alisa Ayase | |
| 2015 | Psycho-Pass: The Movie | Mika Shimotsuki | |
| 2015 | Pokémon the Movie: Hoopa and the Clash of Ages | Meary | |
| 2016 | Garakowa: Restore the World | Dorothy | |
| 2016 | selector destructed WIXOSS | Yuzuki Kurebayashi | |
| 2016–17 | Chain Chronicle Movies | Phoena | |
| 2017 | Trinity Seven the Movie: The Eternal Library and the Alchemist Girl | Levi Kazama | |
| 2017 | King of Prism: Pride the Hero | Rinne | |
| 2017 | Girls und Panzer das Finale | Ogin | |
| 2018 | Non Non Biyori Vacation | Natsumi Koshigaya | |
| 2018 | My Hero Academia: Two Heroes | Ochaco Uraraka | |
| 2019 | Grisaia: Phantom Trigger the Animation | Tohka | |
| 2019 | Promare | Aina Ardebit | |
| 2019 | Psycho-Pass SS Case.1 Tsumi to Bachi | Mika Shimotsuki | |
| 2019 | Trinity Seven: Heavens Library & Crimson Lord | Levi Kazama | |
| 2019 | King of Prism: Shiny Seven Stars IV: Louis x Shin x Unknown | Rinne | |
| 2019 | Weathering with You | Ayane Hanazawa | |
| 2019 | My Hero Academia: Heroes Rising | Ochaco Uraraka | |
| 2019 | Pokémon: Mewtwo Strikes Back—Evolution | Sweet / Neesha | |
| 2019 | BanG Dream! Film Live | Ran Mitake | |
| 2020 | Shirobako: The Movie | Kaede Miyai | |
| 2020 | Love Me, Love Me Not | | |
| 2021 | BanG Dream! Episode of Roselia II: Song I am. | Ran Mitake | |
| 2021 | My Hero Academia: World Heroes' Mission | Ochaco Uraraka | |
| 2021 | BanG Dream! Film Live 2nd Stage | Ran Mitake | |
| 2022 | Deemo: Memorial Keys | Rosalia | |
| 2022 | The Quintessential Quintuplets Movie | Yotsuba Nakano | |
| 2022 | Backflip!! | Asawo Kurikoma | |
| 2023 | Rakudai Majo: Fūka to Yami no Majo | Lilica | |
| 2023 | Black Clover: Sword of the Wizard King | Nero | |
| 2023 | Pretty Guardian Sailor Moon Cosmos The Movie | Kō Yaten / Sailor Star Healer | |
| 2024 | Mobile Suit Gundam SEED Freedom | Toyah Mashima | |
| 2024 | My Hero Academia: You're Next | Ochaco Uraraka | |
| 2025 | Batman Ninja vs. Yakuza League | Jessica Cruz / Green Lantern | |
| 2025 | Toi-san | Yuri Himeno | |
| 2025 | You and Idol Pretty Cure the Movie: For You! Our Kirakilala Concert! | Amas | |
| 2026 | Killtube | Leonardo | |
| 2026 | Expelled from Paradise: Resonance from the Heart | Gabriel | |

=== Video games ===
| Year | Title | Role |
|---|---|---|
| 2012 | Under Night In-Birth: Exe Late | Linne |
| 2014 | Flowers -Le Volume sur Printemps- | Erika Yaegaki |
| 2014 | Chain Chronicle | various male and female characters |
| 2014 | Granblue Fantasy | Clarisse |
| 2014 | Left 4 Dead: Survivors | Haruka Hirose |
| 2014 | Kai-Ri-Sei Million Arthur | Thief Arthur |
| 2015 | Battle Girl High School | Wakaba Subaru |
| 2015 | Flowers -Le volume sur été- | Erika Yaegaki |
| 2015 | Fate/Grand Order | Queen Medb, Miyamoto Musashi, Assassin of Paraiso/Mochizuki Chiyome |
| 2015 | Tokyo Mirage Sessions ♯FE | Eleonora Yumizuru |
| 2015 | Makai Ichiban Kan | Ruche |
| 2015 | Yoru no Nai Kuni | Corrine |
| 2015 | Date A Live: Rio Reincarnation | Rio Sonogami |
| 2016 | Flowers - Le volume sur Automne- | Erika Yaegaki |
| 2016 | Girls' Frontline | QBZ-97, De Lisle |
| 2017 | Flowers - Le volume sur Hiver- | Erika Yaegaki |
| 2017 | Grisaia: Phantom Trigger | Shishigaya Tohka |
| 2017 | Azur Lane | Prinz Eugen |
| 2017 | Blue Reflection | Yuri Saiki |
| 2017 | BanG Dream! Girls Band Party! | Ran Mitake |
| 2017 | Honkai Impact 3rd | Yae Sakura |
| 2017 | Fire Emblem Heroes | Minerva, Julia, Eleonora, Nils |
| 2017 | Xenoblade Chronicles 2 | Mikumari/Praxis |
| 2017 | Kirara Fantasia | Hoto Cocoa, Merry Nightmare |
| 2017 | Magia Record: Puella Magi Madoka Magica Side Story | Felicia Mitsuki |
| 2018 | BlazBlue: Cross Tag Battle | Linne |
| 2018 | Fire Emblem Warriors | Minerva |
| 2018 | Arena of Valor | Roxie (Japanese Voice) |
| 2018 | Valkyria Chronicles 4 | Angelica Farnaby |
| 2018 | My Hero: One's Justice | Ochaco Uraraka |
| 2018 | Sdorica | Kittyeyes, Kittyeyes SP, Leah, Leah SP, Leah MZ |
| 2018 | Sword Art Online: Fatal Bullet | Kureha |
| 2018 | The King of Fighters All Star | Kaya |
| 2018 | SNK Heroines: Tag Team Frenzy | Arthur Thief |
| 2018 | Food Fantasy | MoonCake |
| 2018 | Another Eden | Ruina, Yuna |
| 2018 | Dragalia Lost | Lin You |
| 2019 | Our World is Ended | Yuno Hayase |
| 2019 | Grand Chase: Dimensional Chaser | Edel Frost |
| 2019 | Pokémon Masters | Kasumi |
| 2019 | Sakura Wars | Sakura Amamiya |
| 2019 | Ash Arms | P-47 Thunderbolt, M26 Pershing |
| 2019 | Arknights | Nearl |
| 2019 | Ys IX: Monstrum Nox | Yufa Gamberg |
| 2020 | Persona 5 Strikers | Alice Hiiragi |
| 2020 | My Hero One's Justice 2 | Ochaco Uraraka |
| 2020 | No Straight Roads | Mayday |
| 2020 | Princess Connect! Re:Dive | Chieru |
| 2021 | Birdie Crush | Erin G. Brid |
| 2021 | Blue Archive | Iori Shiromi |
| 2021 | Rakugaki Kingdom | Fujimaru |
| 2021 | Cinderella Nine | Musubi Serizawa |
| 2021 | Black Surgenight | Ashigara |
| 2021 | Alchemy Stars | Cuscuta Benny and Curo |
| 2021 | Genshin Impact | Yae Miko |
| 2021 | Azur Lane | Ägir |
| 2021 | Tsukihime -A piece of blue glass moon- | Mario Gallo Bestino |
| 2021 | MELTY BLOOD: TYPE LUMINA | Mario Gallo Bestino |
| 2021 | Cookie Run: Kingdom | Kumiho Cookie |
| 2021 | Digimon New Century | Alice Yazawa |
| 2021 | Counter:Side | Orca |
| 2022 | Arknights | Goldenglow, Nearl |
| 2022 | Identity V | Tracy Reznik/Mechanic |
| 2022 | Tower of Fantasy | Protagonist (female) |
| 2022 | Goddess of Victory: Nikke | Julia |
| 2023 | Master Detective Archives: Rain Code | Guillaume Hall |
| 2023 | Fate/Samurai Remnant | Berserker |
| 2023 | Racing Master | Hayley/Coco |
| 2025 | The Hundred Line: Last Defense Academy | Tsubasa Kawana |
| 2025 | Groove Coaster Future Performers | Aria Himekawa |
| 2026 | Honkai: Star Rail | Evanescia |

=== Dubbing ===
==== Live-action ====
- Deadpool & Wolverine, Cassandra Nova (Emma Corrin)
- The Exorcist: Believer, Angela Fielding (Lidya Jewett)
- The Girl with All the Gifts, Melanie (Sennia Nanua)
- Gran Turismo, Leah Vega (Emelia Hartford)
- Guardians of the Galaxy Vol. 3, Lylla (Linda Cardellini)
- Heart of Stone, Keya Dhawan (Alia Bhatt)
- Lord of the Flies, Simon (Ike Talbut)
- The Nun II, Sophie (Caitlin Rose Downey)
- School of Rock, Tomika (Breanna Yde)
- The Time Traveler's Wife, Charisse (Natasha Lopez)

==== Animation ====
- Ballerina, Dora
- The Cuphead Show!, Ms. Chalice
- Gabby's Dollhouse, Kitty Fairy
- Sing, Rabbit 2 (Central Chorus)
- Sing 2, Piglet Adeline
- Toy Story 5
- White Snake, Xiao Qing

== Discography ==
| First Order Date | CD Name | Artist | Song | Note |
2011
| Jan 26 | Yume to Kibou to Ashita no Atashi | Merry Nightmare (Ayane Sakura) | Yume to Kibou to Ashita no Atashi | Television Animation Dream Eater Merry Ending Theme Song |
| Jan 26 | Yume to Kibou to Ashita no Atashi | Merry Nightmare (Ayane Sakura) | Hatsuyume Choko Donuts | Television Animation Dream Eater Merry Character Song |
2012
| May 9 | Listen to Me, Girls. I Am Your Father! Blu-Ray Vol. 3 Tokuten CD | Luna Noir (Ayane Sakura), Luna Fleur (Touyama Nao) | Runaruna Go! Go! | Television Animation Listen to Me, Girls. I Am Your Father! Character Song |
| Jul 25 | Heavenly Lover | Konoe Tsuruma (Kaori Ishihara), Miyabi Kannagi (Ayane Sakura), Rinka Kunitachi (Ayana Taketatsu), Mana Tendou (Asuka Ōgame), Mei Sagara (Rina Hidaka) | Heavenly Lover | Television Animation Nakaimo - My Sister Is Among Them! Ending Theme Song |
| Jul 25 | Heavenly Lover | Konoe Tsuruma (Kaori Ishihara), Miyabi Kannagi (Ayane Sakura) | Midnight Girls Summit☆ | Web Radio Nakaimo - My Sister Is Among Them! Theme Song |
| Aug 15 | Oato ga Yoroshikutte...Yo! | 極♨落女会 (Ayane Sakura, Kotori Koiwai, Nozomi Yamamoto, Yoshino Nanjō and Saori Gotō) | Oato ga Yoroshikutte...Yo! | Television Animation Joshiraku Opening Theme Song |
| Aug 15 | Oato ga Yoroshikutte...Yo! | 極♨落女会 (Ayane Sakura, Kotori Koiwai, Nozomi Yamamoto, Yoshino Nanjō and Saori Gotō) | Ren`ai Kowai | |
| Sep 26 | Nakaimo - My Sister Is Among Them! Character Song Vol. 2 | Miyabi Kannagi (Ayane Sakura) | Tonari Doushi. | Television Animation Nakaimo - My Sister Is Among Them! Character Song |
| Sep 26 | Nakaimo - My Sister Is Among Them! Character Song Vol. 2 | Miyabi Kannagi (Ayane Sakura) | Virgin Road de Matteite! (Miyabi Kannagi Ver.) | Television Animation Nakaimo - My Sister Is Among Them! Character Song |
| Sep 26 | Joshiraku Blu-ray&DVD Vol. 1 | Marī Buratei (Ayane Sakura) | Tsuwamono-domo ni Tsugu | Television Animation Joshiraku Character Song |
| Dec 19 | Pretty Rhythm: Dear My Future - Prism Song Collection "Life Is Just a Miracle" | Prizmmy☆ぼいすアクトレス(Ayami Ōruri (Ayane Sakura), Karin Shijimi (Minami Tsuda), Reina Miyama (Natsumi Takamori), Mia Ageha (Rumi Ōkubo) | Life is just a miracle | Television Animation Pretty Rhythm: Dear My Future Character Song |
| Dec 19 | Pretty Rhythm: Dear My Future - Prism Song Collection "Life Is Just a Miracle" | Sprouts (Reina Miyama (Natsumi Takamori), Ayami (Ayane Sakura), Serena Jōnouchi (Madoka Yonezawa)) | Mirage JET | Television Animation Pretty Rhythm: Dear My Future Character Song |
2013
| Mar 27 | Vividred Operation Blu-ray&DVD Vol. 1 | Akane Isshiki (Ayane Sakura), Aoi Futaba (Rie Murakawa) | WE ARE ONE! | Television Animation Vividred Operation Ending Theme Song |
| Mar 27 | Vividred Operation Blu-ray&DVD Vol. 1 | Akane Isshiki (Ayane Sakura) | Friend of mine | Television Animation Vividred Operation Character Song |
| Apr 24 | Vividred Operation Blu-ray&DVD Vol. 2 | Akane Isshiki (Ayane Sakura), Wakaba Saegusa (Yuka Ōtsubo) | STEREO COLORS | Television Animation Vividred Operation Ending Theme Song |
| Apr 24 | Vividred Operation Blu-ray&DVD Vol. 2 | Akane Isshiki (Ayane Sakura), Himawari Shinomiya (Aya Uchida) | Stray Sheep Story | Television Animation Vividred Operation Ending Theme Song |
| May 29 | Vividred Operation Blu-ray&DVD Vol. 3 | Akane Isshiki (Ayane Sakura), Aoi Futaba (Rie Murakawa), Wakaba Saegusa (Yuka Ōtsubo), Himawari Shinomiya (Aya Uchida), Rei Kuroki (Maaya Uchida) | Vivid Shining Sky | Television Animation Vividred Operation Ending Theme Song |
| May 29 | Vividred Operation Blu-ray&DVD Vol. 3 | Akane Isshiki (Ayane Sakura), Aoi Futaba (Rie Murakawa), Wakaba Saegusa (Yuka Ōtsubo), Himawari Shinomiya (Aya Uchida), Rei Kuroki (Maaya Uchida) | Let's be together!! | Television Animation Vividred Operation Character Song |
| Jun 12 | Aiura CHARACTER SONG♪や | Mei Yanase (Ayane Sakura) | グッとLuck! Everyday | Television Animation Aiura Character Song |
| Jun 12 | Aiura CHARACTER SONG♪や | Mei Yanase (Ayane Sakura) | ちぇあWooman | Television Animation Aiura Character Song |
| Jun 26 | Pretty Rhythm Rainbow Live: Prism Music Collection DX | Rinne (Ayane Sakura) | Gift | Television Animation Pretty Rhythm: Rainbow Live Insert Song |
| Aug 14 | Sentimental Love | Yuzuki Eba (Megumi Nakajima), Asuka Mishima (Ayane Sakura), Nanami Kanzaki (Yuki Takao) | Senkou Hanabi | Television Animation A Town Where You Live Character Song |
| Aug 28 | High School DxD New Ending Chara Song Album | Occult Research Club Girls [ Rias Gremory (Yōko Hikasa), Akeno Himejima (Shizuka Itō), Asia Argento (Azumi Asakura), Koneko Toujou (Ayana Taketatsu), Xenovia (Risa Taneda), Gasper Vladi (Ayane Sakura) ] | Lovely♥Devil | Television Animation High SchoolD×D NEW Ending Theme Song |
| Aug 28 | High School DxD New Ending Chara Song Album | Gasper Vladi (Ayane Sakura) | Ugokidashita Jikan no Naka de | Television Animation High SchoolD×D NEW Character Song |
| Sep 18 | Kimi no Iru Machi Character Song Album Answer Songs | Asuka Mishima (Ayane Sakura) | Naname Ushiro Sora | Television Animation A Town Where You Live Character Song |
| Sep 18 | Kimi no Iru Machi Character Song Album Answer Songs | Asuka Mishima (Ayane Sakura) | Sayonara no Tame ni | Television Animation A Town Where You Live Character Song |
