= 12th Seiyu Awards =

Japanese voice acting awards ceremony in 2018

- Awarded for: Voice acting in Japan
- Date: March 3, 2018
- Location: JOQR Media Plus Hall; Minato, Tokyo
- Country: Japan

Highlights
- Best Lead Actor: Toshiyuki Toyonaga
- Best Lead Actress: Tomoyo Kurosawa
- Website: www.seiyuawards.jp

The 12th Seiyu Awards was held on March 3, 2018 at the JOQR Media Plus Hall in Minato, Tokyo. The winners of the Merit Awards, the Kei Tomiyama Award and the Kazue Takahashi Award were announced on February 16, 2018. The rest of the winners were announced on the ceremony day.

Winners	Agency	Highlight Voice Roles	Works (Format)
Best Actor in a Leading Role
Toshiyuki Toyonaga	Super Eccentric Theater	Yuri Katsuki	Anime TV series Yuri on Ice
Toshiyuki Toyonaga	Super Eccentric Theater	Sora Ohara	Anime TV series Tsukipro The Animation
Best Actress in a Leading Role
Tomoyo Kurosawa	Mausu Promotion	Phosphophyllite	Anime TV series Land of the Lustrous
Tomoyo Kurosawa	Mausu Promotion	Kumiko Oumae	Anime Film Sound! Euphonium: The Movie – May the Melody Reach You!
Best Actors in Supporting Roles
Junichi Suwabe	Haikyō	Viktor Nikiforov	Anime TV series Yuri on Ice
Junichi Suwabe	Haikyō	Archer	Anime Film Fate/stay night: Heaven's Feel I. presage flower
Best Actresses in Supporting Roles
Saori Ōnishi	I'm Enterprise	Eriri Spencer Sawamura	Anime TV series Saekano: How to Raise a Boring Girlfriend Flat
Saori Ōnishi	I'm Enterprise	Hisako Arato	Anime TV series Food Wars! Shokugeki no Soma The Third Plate
Ayane Sakura	I'm Enterprise	Shizuku Hanaoka	Anime TV series Welcome to the Ballroom
Ayane Sakura	I'm Enterprise	La Pucelle / Souta Kishibe	Anime TV series Magical Girl Raising Project
Best Rookie Actors
Kōtarō Nishiyama	81 Produce	Eichi Horimiya	Anime TV series TsukiPro The Animation
Shun Horie	Pro-Fit	Tsugiyoshi Sumino	Anime TV series Juni Taisen: Zodiac War
Taku Yashiro	VIMS	Naoto Azuma	Anime TV series Tiger Mask W
Best Rookie Actresses
Ayaka Nanase	Axl-One	Yoshino Koharu	Anime TV series Sakura Quest
Yui Fukuo	81 Produce	Linze Silhoueska	Anime TV series In Another World With My Smartphone
Singing Award
Winner	Members	Agency	
Dōbutsu Biscuits x PPP	Saki Ono; Yuka Ozaki; Kana Motomiya; Aina Aiba; Ikuko Chikuta; Mikoi Sakaki; Ruka Nemoto; Kyouka Tamura		
Personality Award
Winner(s)	Agency	Radio program	Broadcasting Station
Ayane Sakura; Saori Ōnishi	I'm Enterprise	Sakura Toshitai Ōnishi	JOQR

Merit Award
Winners	Agency
Hiroshi Masuoka	Haikyō
Tomie Kataoka	Seinenza Theater Company
Kei Tomiyama Memorial Award
Winner	Agency
Chō	Haikyō
Kazue Takahashi Memorial Award
Winner	Agency
Miina Tominaga	Haikyō
Synergy Award
Winner
Despicable Me 3
Special Award
Winner	Agency
Takayuki Matsutani	Tezuka Productions
