= Kaho Kōda =

Japanese voice actress (born 1967)

Kaho Kōda (幸田 夏穂, Kōda Kaho) is a Japanese voice actress, who was born on July 8, 1967, in Tokyo, Japan. She is represented by 81 Produce.

== Notable filmography ==
- Nataku in Saiyuki
- Kanoe in X/1999 the series
- Kinu in Shinobido: Way of the Ninja
- Cher Degré in Wolf's Rain
- Miho Karasuma in Witch Hunter Robin
- Ultima in the Radio Edition of Final Fantasy Tactics Advance
- Nephelia in Galaxy Angel: Moonlit Lovers
- Announcer in Sonic Adventure
- Computer Voice and various Female Citizens of Haven City in Jak II (Japanese version)
- Madam Oreille in Darker than Black: Ryūsei no Gemini
- Solice Malvin in Pumpkin Scissors
- Twi Chang in D.Gray-man Hallow
- Arisa Munakata in Tomica Hyper Rescue Drive Head Kidō Kyūkyū Keisatsu
- Keiei Lee in Godzilla Singular Point

=== Dubbing ===
- Bottoms Up, Lisa Mancini (Paris Hilton)
- Bring It On Again, Tina Hammersmith (Bree Turner)
- Chicken with Plums, Faranguisse (Maria de Medeiros)
- Cursed, Ellie Myers (Christina Ricci)
- Daddy Day Camp, Kim Hinton (Tamala Jones)
- Duets, Suzi Loomis (Maria Bello)
- Enough Said, Eva (Julia Louis-Dreyfus)
- The Fabulous Baker Boys, Nina
- The Fast and the Furious, Mia Toretto (Jordana Brewster)
- Final Destination 3, Erin Ulmer (Alexz Johnson)
- Fired Up!, Diora (Molly Sims)
- Godzilla x Kong: The New Empire, Cadogan
- Julie & Julia, Julie Powell (Amy Adams)
- My Life Without Me, Ann (Leonor Watling)
- Sabrina the Teenage Witch, Jenny Kelley (Michelle Beaudoin)
- Saw III, Amanda Young (Shawnee Smith)
