= List of Shinkansen Henkei Robo Shinkalion characters =

The Shinkansen Henkei Robo Shinkalion anime series features an extensive cast of characters designed by Yuka Aono.

== Main characters ==
Mainly the drivers from Shinkansen Ultra Evolution Institute Ōmiya Branch. Also known as Team Ōmiya.
Hayato Hayasugi (速杉 ハヤト, Hayasugi Hayato)
Voiced by: Ayane Sakura
Ex-driver of the Shinkalion E5 Hayabusa and current driver of the Shinkalion E5 Hayabusa MkII. An 11-year-old who lives in Ōmiya, Saitama Prefecture.
Akita Oga (男鹿 アキタ, Oga Akita)
Voiced by: Manami Numakura
Driver of the Shinkalion E6 Komachi. An 11-year-old who hails from Kitaakita, Akita Prefecture.
Tsuranuki Daimonyama (大門山 ツラヌキ, Daimonyama Tsuranuki)
Voiced by: Rie Murakawa
Driver of the Shinkalion E7 Kagayaki. An 11-year-old who hails from Kanazawa, Ishikawa Prefecture.
Shashot (シャショット, Shashotto)
Voiced by: Yūji Ueda
Hayato's partner. A Conductor Robot with Deep learning functioned AI specially built for Shinkanlion E5 Hayabusa.
Shinobu Tsukiyama (月山 シノブ, Tsukiyama Shinobu)
Voiced by: Nanami Yoshimura
Driver of the Shinkalion E3 Tsubasa and Shinkalion E3 Tsubasa Iron Wing. A 10-year-old who lives in Yonezawa, Yamagata Prefecture.
Azusa Ueda (上田アズサ, Ueda Azusa)
Voiced by: Ayana Taketatsu
Azusa is a popular elementary school YouTuber and a classmate of Hayato. She is the only member of Team Omiya who is not a Shinkalion driver.
Seiryu (セイリュウ, Seiryuu)
Voiced by: Kei Shindō
Driver of Black Shinkalion. He was formerly a Kitoralsus agent, but eventually joins the institute since episode 55. Currently lives in Azusa's home.

== Supporting cast ==
=== Other Shinkalion Drivers ===
==== Tokai Command Office Nagoya Branch ====
Ryūji Kiyosu (清洲 リュウジ, Kiyosu Ryuuji)
Voiced by: Ryota Osaka, Ami Naito
Ex-driver of the Shikalion N700A Nozomi and current driver of the Shinkalion Doctor Yellow. A 14-year-old who lives in Nagoya, Aichi Prefecture.
Tatsumi Kiyosu (清洲タツミ, Kiyosu Tatsumi)
Voiced by: Yumi Hino
Ryūji's younger brother and the second driver of the Shikalion N700A Nozomi. A 12-year-old who lives in Nagoya, Aichi Prefecture.

==== Hokkaido Command Office Hokkaido Branch ====
Miku Hatsune (発音 ミク, Hatsune Miku)
Voiced by: Saki Fujita
Driver of the Shinkalion H5 Hayabusa. An 11-year-old who lives in Sapporo, Hokkaido. She is designed and named after a character of the same name from the Vocaloid series, but with a different spelling (初音 versus 発音).

==== Kyushu Command Office Moji Branch ====
Rei Ōzora (大空 レイ, Oozora Rei)
Voiced by: Eriko Matsui
Driver of the Shinkalion 800 Tsubame. A 9-year-old who lives in Kitakyushu, Fukuoka Prefecture.
Takatora Kirishima (霧島 タカトラ, Kirishima Takatora)
Voiced by: Mitsuhiro Ichiki
Driver of the Shinkalion N700 Mizuho. A 12-year-old who lives in Kagoshima, Kagoshima Prefecture.

==== West Japan Command Office Kyoto Branch ====
Gin Itsutsubashi (五ツ橋 ギン, Itsutsubashi Gin)
Voiced by: Eri Goda
Driver of the Shinkalion 700 Hikari Railstar. An 11-year-old and twin brother to Jō who lives in Yamaguchi Prefecture.
Jō Itsutsubashi (五ツ橋 ジョウ, Itsutsubashi Jou)
Voiced by: Eri Goda
Driver of the Shinkalion 700 Nozomi. An 11-year-old and twin brother to Gin who lives in Yamaguchi Prefecture.

=== Shinkansen Ultra Evolution Institute Staff Members ===
==== East Japan Command Office Ōmiya Branch ====
Hokuto Hayasugi (速杉ホクト, Hayasugi Hokuto)
Voiced by: Tomokazu Sugita
Father of Hayato and Haruka. Director of Shinkansen Ultra Evolution Institute Ōmiya Branch. Later becomes the driver of Shinkalion 500 Kodama and Shinkalion 923 Doctor Yellow.
Shinpei Izumi (出水シンぺイ, Izumi Shinpei)
Voiced by: Hikaru Midorikawa
Commander of Shinkansen Ultra Evolution Institute Ōmiya Branch.
Futaba Mihara (三原フタバ, Mihara Futaba)
Voiced by: Sora Amamiya
One of the operators of Shinkansen Ultra Evolution Institute Ōmiya Branch. After Hokuto's transference to Kyoto, she becomes the Acting Director of the Ōmiya Branch.
Akagi Honjo (本庄アカギ, Honjo Akagi)
Voiced by: Kiyotaka Furushima
One of the operators of Shinkansen Ultra Evolution Institute Ōmiya Branch.
Daiya Oyama (小山ダイヤ, Oyama Daiya)
Voiced by: Kōhei Amasaki (episode 08 only), Noriaki Kanze (episode 26-)
One of the operators of Shinkansen Ultra Evolution Institute Ōmiya Branch.
Minori Sanjo (三条ミノリ, Sanjo Minori)
Voiced by: Wakana Kingyo
One of the operators of Shinkansen Ultra Evolution Institute Ōmiya Branch.
Hibiki Mishima (三島ヒビキ, Mishima Hibiki)
Voiced by: Nodoka Hasegawa
Researcher of Shinkansen Ultra Evolution Institute Ōmiya Branch.
Midori Kurume (久留米ミドリ, Kurume Midori)
Voiced by: Saki Endo
Medical personnel of Shinkansen Ultra Evolution Institute Ōmiya Branch.
Nagato Yamaguchi (山口ナガト, Yamaguchi Nagato)
Voiced by: Masaki Ihara
Mechanic of Shinkansen Ultra Evolution Institute Ōmiya Branch.
Kintoki Odawara (小田原キントキ, Odawara Kintoki)
Voiced by: Yō Kitazawa
Mechanic of Shinkansen Ultra Evolution Institute Ōmiya Branch.

==== West Japan Command Office Kyoto Branch ====
Kaisei Akashi (明石カイセイ, Akashi Kaisei)
Voiced by: Shinnosuke Musashi
Operator and trainer of Shinkansen Ultra Evolution Institute Kyoto Branch.

==== Tokai Command Office Nagoya Branch ====
Rindo Hashima (羽島リンドウ, Hashima Rindou)
Voiced by: Takanori Hoshino
Commander of Shinkansen Ultra Evolution Institute Tokai Branch.
Suruga Hamamatsu (浜松スルガ, Hamamatsu Suruga)
Voiced by: Shunsuke Sakai
Operator of Shinkansen Ultra Evolution Institute Tokai Branch.

==== Hokkaido Command Office Hokkaido Branch ====
Soya Onuma (大沼ソウヤ, Oonuma Souya)
Voiced by: Takaya Hashi
Commander of Shinkansen Ultra Evolution Institute Hokkaido Branch.
Kamui Oshima (渡島カムイ, Oshima Kamui)
Voiced by: Tatsunori Tsujimoto
Operator of Shinkansen Ultra Evolution Institute Hokkaido Branch.

==== Kyushu Command Office Moji Branch ====
Akatsuki Ogura (小倉アカツキ, Ogura Akatsuki)
Voiced by: Fumiya Yazaki
Commander of Shinkansen Ultra Evolution Institute Moji Branch.
Nagisa Sendai (川内ナギサ, Sendai Nagisa)
Voiced by: Wakana Kingyo
Operator and trainer of Shinkansen Ultra Evolution Institute Moji Branch.

==== General Command Office ====
Subaru Azuma (東スバル, Azuma Subaru)
Voiced by: Koichi Yamadera
The chief commander of Shinkansen Ultra Evolution Institute.
Haruna Takasaki (高崎ハルナ, Takasaki Haruna)
Voiced by: Mami Fujita
Secretary general of Shinkansen Ultra Evolution Institute General Command Office.
Penguin (ペンギン, Pengin)
Voiced by: Wakana Kingyo
Subaru's pet penguin. It is based on the mascot of Suica, a type of JR East IC card.

=== Other supporting characters ===
==== Hayasugi Family ====
Sakura Hayasugi (速杉サクラ, Hayasugi Sakura)
Voiced by: Risa Shimizu
Wife of Hokuto and Mother of Hayato & Haruka.
Haruka Hayasugi (速杉ハルカ, Hayasugi Haruka)
Voiced by: Wakana Kingyo
Hayato's younger sister.

==== Ueda Family ====
Dad (パパ, Papa)
Voiced by: Yūji Ueda
Father of Azusa.

==== Omiya Elementary School ====
Inori Nagaoka (長岡イノリ, Nagaoka Inori)
Voiced by: Naomi Maruyama
Homeroom teacher of Hayato, Akita, Tsuranuki and Azusa.

==== Oga Family ====
Momiji Oga (男鹿モミジ, Oga Momiji)
Voiced by: Miho Masaka
Mother of Akita Oga.
Grandpa (祖父, Sofu)
Voiced by: Shouji Izumi
Grandfather of Akita.

==== Daimonyama Family ====
Misuzu Daimonyama (大門山ミスズ, Daimonyama Misuzu)
Voiced by: Rie Takahashi
Mother of Tsuranuki, Kagari and Kenroku.
Kagari Daimonyama (大門山カガリ, Daimonyama Kagari)
Voiced by: Miyuki Kobori
Tsuranuki's younger sister.
Kenroku Daimonyama (大門山ケンロク, Daimonyama Kenroku)
Voiced by: Haruka Shamoto
Tsuranuki's younger brother.

==== Tsukiyama Family ====
Chiaki Tsukiyama (月山チアキ, Tsukiyama Chiaki)
Voiced by: Yuka Adachi
Mother of Shinobu Tsukiyama.

==== Kiyosu Family ====
Chikuma Kiyosu (清洲チクマ, Kiyosu Chikuma)
Voiced by: Ryota Osaka
Late father of Ryūji, Tatsumi and Miyu.
Kaede Kiyosu (清洲カエデ, Kiyosu Kaede)
Voiced by: Yuka Hirose
Mother of Ryūji, Tatsumi and Miu.
Miyu Kiyosu (清洲ミユ, Kiyosu Miyu)
Voiced by: Kei Shindo
Ryūji and Tatsumi's younger sister.

==== Kirishima Family ====
Nichirin Kirishima (霧島ニチリン, Kirishima Nichirin)
Voiced by: Kazumasa Fukagawa
Father of Takatora Kirishima.

==== Kurashiki Family ====
Yakumo Kurashiki (倉敷ヤクモ, Kurashiki Yakumo)
Voiced by: Kengo Tsujii
Izumo Kurashiki (倉敷イズモ, Kurashiki Izumo)
Voiced by: Mitsuru Ogata

== Kitoralsus ==
Kitoralsus (キトラルザス, Kitoraruzasu) is an ancient humanoid species who live in the underground world.

=== The Agents ===
Byakko (ビャッコ, Byakko)
Voiced by: Yoshimasa Hosoya
The third driver of Black Shinkalion Ogre.
Genbu (ゲンブ, Genbu)
Voiced by: Maxwell Powers
The second driver of the Shinkalion E5 Hayabusa.
Suzaku (スザク, Suzaku)
Voiced by: Akeno Watanabe
The only female Kitoralsus Agent.

=== The Old Generation Agents ===
Torame (トラメ, Torame)
Voiced by: Toshitsugu Takashina
Sougyoku (ソウギョク, Sougyoku)
Voiced by: Kenji Yamauchi
The second driver of Black Shinkalion Ogre.
Kairen (カイレン, Kairen)
Voiced by: Toshiki Masuda
The leader of the old generation Kitoralsus Agents.

=== Others ===
Dr. Iza (ドクター・イザ, Dokutā Iza)
Voiced by: Yūji Ueda
A mysterious old man who secretly instructs the Agents. His true identity is a human named Isaburou Yatsushiro (八代 イサブロウ, Yatsushiro Isaburou), the former leader of Shinkansen Ultra Evolution Institute.
Kirin (キリン, Kirin)
Voiced by: Daisuke Namikawa
The driver of Black Shinkalion Ogre.

=== Valhallan ===
Nahane (ナハネ, Nahane)
Voiced by: Kentarō Itō
Ohanefu (オハネフ, Ohanefu)
Voiced by: Kōtarō Yoshida

== Main characters (Movie) ==
The Young Hokuto (少年ホクト, Shōnen Hokuto)
Voiced by: Rie Kugimiya
Driver of the Shinkalion ALFA-X. A 9-year-old counterpart of Hokuto Hayasugi from another timeline who was brought to Hayato's world by accident.

== Main characters (Shinkansen Henkei Robo Shinkalion Z) ==
Shin Arata (新多 シン, Arata Shin)
Voiced by: Minami Tsuda
Driver of the Shinkalion Z E5 Hayabusa. An 11-year-old who lives in Tabata, Tokyo.
Abuto Usui (碓氷 アブト, Usui Abuto)
Voiced by: Akari Kitō
Driver of the Dark Shinkalion. An 11-year-old who lives in Yokokawa, Gunma Prefecture. He is a half-Human, half-Teoti boy.
Smat (スマット, Sumatto)
Voiced by: Jun Fukuyama
Shin's partner. A robot converted from the Ultra Evolution Mobile Z Gear.
Hanabi Ōmagari (大曲 ハナビ, Ōmagari Hanabi)
Voiced by: Yuka Terasaki
Driver of the Shinkalion Z E6 Komachi. An 11-year-old who hails from Ōmagari, Akita Prefecture.
Taiju Togakushi (戸隠 タイジュ, Togakushi Taiju)
Voiced by: Michiko Kaiden
Driver of the Shinkalion Z E7 Kagayaki. An 11-year-old who hails from Kiso, Nagano Prefecture.

== Supporting casts (Shinkansen Henkei Robo Shinkalion Z) ==
=== Other Shinkalion Z Drivers ===
Yamakasa Nakasu (中洲 ヤマカサ, Nakasu Yamakasa)
Voiced by: Miyuri Shimabukuro
Driver of the Shinkalion Z 800 Tsubame. A 12-year-old who hails from Fukuoka, Fukuoka Prefecture.
Nagara Anjō (安城 ナガラ, Anjō Nagara)
Voiced by: Nao Tōyama
Driver of the Shinkalion Z N700S Nozomi. A 10-year-old who hails from Nagoya, Aichi Prefecture.
Shimakaze Anjō (安城 シマカゼ, Anjō Shimakaze)
Voiced by: Yuma Uchida
Nagara's older brother and the co-driver of the Shinkalion Z N700S Nozomi and current driver of the Shinkalion Z Doctor Yellow. A 12-year-old who hails from Nagoya, Aichi Prefecture.
Ginga Arashiyama (嵐山 ギンガ, Arashiyama Ginga)
Voiced by: Shouta Aoi
Driver of the Shinkalion Z 500 Kodama. An 11-year-old who hails from Kyoto, Kyoto Prefecture.
Maetel Tsukino (月野 メーテル, Tsukino Mēteru)
Voiced by: Satsuki Yukino
Driver of the Shinkalion Z H5 Hayabusa. An 11-year-old who hails from Oshamambe, Hokkaido. She is designed and named after a character of the same name from the Galaxy Express 999 franchise.

=== Shinkansen Ultra Evolution Institute Yokokawa Branch ===
Saijō Sogō (十河 サイジョウ, Sogō Saijō)
Voiced by: Kōsuke Gotō
Commander of Shinkansen Ultra Evolution Institute Yokokawa Branch.
Goichi Shima (島 ゴイチ, Shima Goichi)
Voiced by: Takahiro Fujiwara
Head mechanic of Shinkansen Ultra Evolution Institute Yokokawa Branch.
Kasumi Abiko (吾孫子 カスミ, Abiko Kasumi)
Voiced by: Sayaka Senbongi
Instructor of Shinkansen Ultra Evolution Institute Yokokawa Branch.
Misaki Ōishi (大石 ミサキ, Ōishi Misaki)
Voiced by: Satomi Moriya
Operator of Shinkansen Ultra Evolution Institute Yokokawa Branch.
Atsuta Hosokawa (細川 アツタ, Hosokawa Atsuta)
Voiced by: Fumihiro Okabayashi
One of the mechanics of Shinkansen Ultra Evolution Institute Yokokawa Branch.

=== Shinkansen Ultra Evolution Institute Iyo-Saijō Branch ===
Hinode Seto (瀬戸 ヒノデ, Seto Hinode)
Voiced by: Ryū Yamaguchi
Commander of Shinkansen Ultra Evolution Institute Iyo-Saijō Branch.

=== Arata Family ===
Ayu Arata (新多 アユ, Arata Ayu)
Voiced by: Kanon Takao
Shin's older sister.
Kibō Arata (新多 キボウ, Arata Kibō)
Voiced by: Eiji Hanawa
Shin's father.
Toki Arata (新多 トキ, Arata Toki)
Voiced by: Chiemi Ishimatsu
Shin's mother.

=== Usui Family ===
Shirayuki Usui (碓氷 シラユキ, Usui Shirayuki)
Voiced by: Chika Fujimura
Abuto's mother.

=== Ōmagari Family ===
Tanebi Ōmagari (大曲 タネビ, Ōmagari Tanebi)
Voiced by: Masafumi Kimura
Hanabi's father.
Tomoshibi Ōmagari (大曲 トモシビ, Ōmagari Tomoshibi)
Voiced by: Natsuo Takahashi
Hanabi's mother.

=== Togakushi Family ===
Kirikabu Togakushi (戸隠 キリカブ, Togakushi Kirikabu)
Voiced by: Yūsuke Shiro'oka
Taiju's father.
Kozue Togakushi (戸隠 コズエ, Togakushi Kozue)
Voiced by: Yukiko Motoyoshi
Taiju's mother.
Masakari Togakushi (戸隠 マサカリ, Togakushi Masakari)
Voiced by: Tadashi Miyazawa
Taiju's grandfather.

=== Nakasu Family ===
Dontaku Nakasu (中洲 ドンタク, Nakasu Dontaku)
Voiced by: Shōhei Tō
Yamakasa's father.
Hōjō Nakasu (中洲 ホウジョウ, Nakasu Hōjō)
Voiced by: Akiko Koga
Yamakasa's mother.

=== Anjō Family ===
Shinano Anjō (安城 シナノ, Anjō Shinano)
Voiced by: Gō Inoue
Nagara and Shimakaze's father.

=== Arashiyama Family ===
Asahi Arashiyama (嵐山 アサヒ, Arashiyama Asahi)
Ginga's father.
Kirameki Arashiyama (嵐山 キラメキ, Arashiyama Kirameki)
Ginga's mother.

== Teoti ==
Teoti (テオティ, Teoti) is an ancient humanoid species who live in the spaceship called Yugosupia (ユゴスピア, Yugosupia).

=== The Agents ===
Wadatsumi (ワダツミ, Wadatsumi)
Voiced by: Tōru Sakurai
Valtom (ヴァルトム, Varutomu)
Voiced by: Masaya Matsukaze
Tokonami Usui (碓氷 トコナミ, Usui Tokonami)
Voiced by: Kōsuke Tanabe
Abuto's father. His true identity is a member of Teoti named Zagan (ザガン, Zagan).

=== The Royal Family ===
King of Teoti (テオティの王, Teoti no Ō)
Voiced by: Hisao Egawa
Kannagi (カンナギ, Kannagi)
Voiced by: Yōhei Azakami
He is the Crown prince of Teoti and Astrea's twin younger brother.
Akeno Myojo (明星 アケノ, Myōjō Akeno)
Voiced by: Marina Inoue
Her true identity is a member of Teoti and Kannagi's twin older sister named Astrea (アストレア, Asutorea).

=== Yugosupia Resident ===
Setsura (セツラ, Setsura)
Voiced by: Yurika Kubo

=== The Gardian ===
Bahram (バフラム, Bafuramu)
Voiced by: Yūki Hoshi
Camulus (カマルス, Kamarusu)
Voiced by: Akihiro Tajima

== Main characters (Shinkalion: Change the World) ==
Taisei Ōnari (大成 タイセイ, Ōnari Taisei)
Voiced by: Hiiro Ishibashi, Chiyuki Miura(child)
Driver of the Shinkalion CW E5 Hayabusa.
Akane Forden (フォールデン アカネ, Fōruden Akane)
Voiced by: Kensho Ono
Driver of the Shinkalion CW E6 Komachi. He is a half-French, half-Japanese boy.
Ryōta Kuzuryū (九頭竜 リョータ, Kuzuryū Ryōta)
Voiced by: Shimba Tsuchiya, Arisa Sekine(child)
Driver of the Shinkalion CW E7 Kagayaki.
Ten Uotora (魚虎 テン, Uotora Ten)
Voiced by: Natsumi Fujiwara
Driver of the Shinkalion CW N700S Nozomi.
Shion Goryōkaku (五稜郭 シオン, Goryōkaku Shion)
Voiced by: Masumi Tazawa, Yūto Uemura(avatar)
Driver of the Shinkalion CW H5 Hayabusa.
Gamma Mogami (最上 ガンマ, Mogami Gamma)
Voiced by: Fumitake Ishiguro
Driver of the Shinkalion CW E8 Tsubasa.
Tsukumo Umikaze (海風 ツクモ, Umikaze Tsukumo)
Voiced by: Tasuku Hatanaka
Driver of the Shinkalion CW N700S Kamome.
Yamato Nishiōji (西大路 ヤマト, Nishiōji Yamato)
Voiced by: Kazuki Ura
Driver of the Shinkalion CW 500 Kodama.
Morito Kuchinashi/Delta (梔子 モリト/デルタ, Kuchinashi Morito/Deruta)
Voiced by: Mutsumi Tamura
Driver of the Shinkalion CW Doctor Yellow and Great Doctor Yellow.
Reiji Takumibe (工部 レイジ, Takumibe Reiji)
Voiced by: Yuki Kaji
Driver of the Shinkalion CW 0 and Hades Shinkalion.

== Supporting casts (Shinkalion: Change the World) ==
Vina (ビーナ, Bīna)
Voiced by: Hana Tamegai
Taisei's navigator AI.
Mai Oume (青梅 マイ, Oume Mai)
Voiced by: Kaede Hondo
Kadomichi Takanawa (高輪 カドミチ, Takanawa Kadomichi)
Voiced by: Chikahiro Kobayashi
Ina Ōnari (大成 イナ, Ōnari Ina)
Voiced by: Eri Kitamura
Taisei's older sister and ex-driver of the Phantom Shinkalion.

== Neon Genesis Evangelion Crossover Characters ==
All the characters here originated from the Neon Genesis Evangelion franchise.

=== Shinkansen Ultra Evolution Institute Kyoto Branch ===
Shinji Ikari (碇 シンジ, Ikari Shinji)
Voiced by: Megumi Ogata
Driver of the Shinkalion 500 TYPE EVA and Shinkalion Z 500 TYPE EVA.
Misato Katsuragi (葛城ミサト, Katsuragi Misato)
Voiced by: Kotono Mitsuishi
Trainer of Shinkansen Ultra Evolution Institute Kyoto Branch.

=== Tokyo-3 Residents ===
Hikari Horaki (洞木ヒカリ, Horaki Hikari)
Voiced by: Junko Iwao
Nozomi Horaki (洞木ノゾミ, Horaki Nozomi)
Voiced by: Junko Iwao
Hikari's younger sister.
Kodama Horaki (洞木コダマ, Horaki Kodama)
Voiced by: Junko Iwao
Hikari and Nozomi's older sister.
Asuka Langley Soryu (惣流・アスカ・ラングレー, Sōryū Asuka Rangurē)
Voiced by: Yūko Miyamura
Rei Ayanami (綾波レイ, Ayanami Rei)
Voiced by: Megumi Hayashibara

=== Others ===
Gendo Ikari (碇 ゲンドウ, Ikari Gendō)
Voiced by: Fumihiko Tachiki
Shinji's father.
