= List of Muv-Luv Alternative: Total Eclipse episodes =

Muv-Luv Alternative: Total Eclipse (マブラヴ オルタネイティヴ トータル・イクリプス, Maburavu Orutaneitivu Tōtaru Ikuripusu) is an anime adaptation of the light novel series of the same name, based on the Muv-Luv visual novel franchise.

The anime is produced by ixtl and Satelight and directed by Takayuki Inagaki and Masaomi Ando, series composition by Takayuki Inagaki, music by Seikou Nagaoka, character design by Yumiko Hara and art and sound direction by Kei Ichikura and Jin Aketagawa respectively. The 24 episode anime series began airing on July 2, 2012, on TV Osaka, TVQ Kyushu Broadcasting, TV Hokkaido, AT-X, TV Setouchi, TV Aichi and Nico Nico Douga in Japan.

Set in an alternative timeline, Earth is invaded by an alien species known as BETA. Overwhelmed by the BETA's superior numbers, mankind develops a jet/mecha hybrid called Tactical Surface Fighters or TSF to counter them. The series follows the members of the UN Project PROMINENCE, a corp of international pilots testing and improving TSF to help Earth's war against the BETA.

The first opening theme is "Go to the Top (song)" by Koda Kumi, and the ending theme is "signs ~Saku Tsuki Hitoyo~" (signs ～朔月一夜～) by Minami Kuribayashi; from episode 20 onwards, the opening theme is "Doubt the World" by Minami Kuribayashi and the ending theme is "Revise the World" by ayami. Music for the anime is produced by Avex Entertainment; insert songs by Avex Entertainment include "NO PLACE LIKE A STAGE" by GRANRODEO, "True 4 Eyes" by Minami Kuribayashi and "Apocalypse of Destiny" by ayami; the special ending theme for episode 17 is "Snow Maiden" (スノウメヰデン, Sunō Meiden) by Misato Aki.

== Episode list ==
No.	Title	Directed by	Written by	Original release date
1	"The Imperial Capital Burns - Part One"; Transliteration: "Teito Moyu (zenpen)" (Japanese: 帝都燃ゆ (前編))	Masashi Abe	Hiroshi Yamaguchi	2 July 2012
In 1967, humanity discovers a hostile alien race called the BETA on the Moon. Despite their attempts to stop them, the BETA makes landfall on Earth in 1973, which leads to a long, grueling 30-year war where the BETA conquers half the Eurasian continent while humanity can only stall them. In 1998, Yui Takamura is a student of the Kyoto Royal Guard Academy where she studies to become an Imperial Guard TSF pilot along with her friends Aki Iwami, Izumi Noto, Shimako Kai and her rival turn friend Kazusa Yamashiro. As the Asian front lines turn dire, Yui's uncle Eiji Iwaya meets with Yuuhi Koubuin of the Shogunate family over a new weapon that might help turn the tide against the BETA. As Yui and her friends improve themselves in TSF combat training, the Korea peninsula is overrun by the BETA. As the Korean front falls and the BETA invades the Japanese isles, Yui and her fellow cadets are ordered to assist the Japanese army in defending the capital of Kyoto.
2	"The Imperial Capital Burns - Part Two"; Transliteration: "Teito Moyu (kōhen)" (Japanese: 帝都燃ゆ (後編))	Kōji Yoshikawa	Hiroshi Yamaguchi	9 July 2012
Despite help by the US Navy, the Japanese forces cannot stop the BETAs due to their numbers, forcing the military to perform scorched earth tactics on Kyoto to destroy them. When their supply base has been overrun by the BETA, Yui's unit are ordered to retreat but her teammates are killed one by one including her friends; Aki is smashed by a Destroyer-Class BETA, Shinmako is shot down by a Laser-Class BETA, Izumi and Kazusa TSFs crash where they are eaten by Soldier-Class BETAs. As Yui is about to suffer the same fate as Kazusa and Izumi, she is rescued by a Takemikazuchi TSF who easily kills the BETAs before she falls unconscious. Yui later awakes, upon learning Kyoto fell and many lives were lost, she mourns for her friends. Three years later, Yui, now a Lieutenant in the Japanese Imperial Guard, heads to Alaska.
3	"Verdant Yukon"; Transliteration: "Sōsōtaru yūkon" (Japanese: 錚々たるユーコン)	Naomichi Yamato	Takayuki Inagaki	16 July 2012
US test pilot Yuuya Bridges and his engineer friend Vincent Lowell transfers to Yukon, Alaska to be part of the United Nations' international test corp Project PROMINENCE, which aims to test and experiment new TSF technology. Yuuya and Vincent join the Argos Test Flight, which aims to develop a new TSF for Japan. After getting to know the members of Argos Flight, the Turkish commander Ibrahim Doğulu, test pilots Nepali Tarisa Manandal, Italian Valerio Giacosa and Swedish Stella Bremer and Development Chief Yui, Tarisa refuses to accept Yuuya as the new leader of Argos Flight due to the fact he has never fought in the front lines unlike the rest of them. To settle things, Yuuya proposes a two on two TSF duel between him and Stella against Tarisa and Valerio. To make things fair, he allows Tarisa to pilot the advance F-15･ACTV TSF while the rest pilot the F-15E TSF. Yuuya uses his tactical genius and teamwork with Stella to defeat Valerio and Tarisa which the latter finally accepts him. Later, Yuuya encounters Yui and is angered when she didn't find his duel impressive but disappointing.
4	"A Flock of Hazy Moons"; Transliteration: "Oborodzuki no mure" (Japanese: 朧月の群れ)	Tomohisa Taguchi	Hiroshi Yamaguchi	23 July 2012
Tensions grow between Yuuya and Yui over their countries different combat doctrine and Yui commenting over his Japanese heritage which Yuuya doesn't like as he hates Japanese people due to racism he suffered as a child. Ordered to fly a Japanese Zuikaku TSF with the rest of Argos Flight in a virtual simulation battle against the BETA, Yuuya is unable to get used to the Zuikaku's controls and is unable to keep up with his seasoned teammates in fighting. After another heated argument with Yui, Yuuya meets Inia Sestina, a Soviet Russian pilot from the Idar Test Flight and one of the "Scarlet Twins". Inia befriends Yuuya and invites him to see her teddy bear Misha at the Soviet sector of the base. However, this gets Yuuya into trouble when Inia's co-pilot, Cryska Barchenowa has Yuuya apprehended, believing he is a Japanese spy. As he is about to be tortured by Soviet interrogators, Yuuya is ordered to be released thanks to Yui's intervention. Inia stills wants to be friends with Yuuya despite Cryska telling her to stay away from him. The next day, Yuuya begins piloting the Type-94 Shiranui TSF.
5	"The Right Stuff"; Transliteration: "Tadashiki shishitsu" (Japanese: 正しき資質)	Seo Hye-jin	Takashi Aoshima	30 July 2012
Still disappointed by Yuuya's performance on piloting Japanese TSFs, Yui gives some advice to him that he shouldn't force the TSF to do things his way but understand it like the proverb "A man and his horse are one". Vincent suggest he should listen to it since he and Yui are not so different; both having a cold attitude but a kind side which they are too stubborn to show. As Argos Flight heads towards their next destination, they suddenly encounter Yui piloting a Takemikazuchi TSF and duels against them. After defeating everyone by melee combat, Yui fights against Yuuya. Finally understanding what Yui told him, Yuuya manages to better pilot the Shiranui to disarm Yui. As his teammates congratulate him, Yui is proud of Yuuya's results.
6	"Ultramarine"; Transliteration: "Gunjō" (Japanese: 群青)	Masayuki Iimura	Yūko Kakihara	6 August 2012
The Argos Flight and Idar Flight crews head to the West Indies to gather test flight data in tropical regions while having R & R at the resorts and participating in a PR photo shoot to raise morale. At first the vacation goes fine until Inia and Tarisa almost start a fight until the resort's commander suggest they settle things in a paddleboat race tomorrow. Yui and Cryska team up when Cryska suddenly faints. Yuuya swims over to help them but a storm suddenly comes, which the three are forced to seek refuge in a cave on a nearby island. As Yuuya heads to check their boat, Cryska, wondering why Inia is interested with Yuuya, asks Yui what is her relationship with him, much to the latter's shock.
7	"Wanderer's Whereabouts"; Transliteration: "Hyōhaku no yukue" (Japanese: 漂泊の行方)	Masashi Abe	Yūko Kakihara	13 August 2012
Yui is unable to answer Cryska why her partner Inia likes being with Yuuya and suggests she should ask him himself. Yuuya returns to the ladies, informing them that their boat was swept away by the storm. As Yuuya and Cryska heads out to figure out where they are, Cryska faints and is about to fall before Yuuya catches her. Cryska reveals she has a fear being near the ocean hence her recent fainting spells. However, Yui arrives mistakenly thinking Yuuya and Cryska are hugging, which makes her jealous. As all three of them are back in the cave, Cryska asks why Yuuya doesn't like being called a Japanese. Yuuya tells Cryska with Yui listening that it is due to his Japanese father; his father left his American mother before he was born and never came back which angered his maternal grandfather to believe the Japanese are scum that shouldn't be trusted. Rescue finally arrives for the three when Inia, Tarisa, Valerio and Stella find them in their TSFs. For troubling everyone, the resort's commander has Yui, Cryska and Inia participate in a swimsuit photo-shoot for the troops while the Argos crew bothers Yuuya if anything happen between him and Yui.
8	"Far East Battle Lines"; Transliteration: "Kyokutō sensen" (Japanese: 極東戦線)	Tatsuya Nokimori; Yōsuke Hashiguchi	Hiroshi Yamaguchi	20 August 2012
Project PROMINENCE heads to the Kamchatka front lines to gather test flight data in cold regions and their first live battle data with the BETA along with Yui being pressured by both the UN and Japanese government to test her uncle's new weapon, the EML-99X rapid-fire railgun. The Argos crew notices Yuuya and Yui are now more friendlier with each other and support it. Yui shows Yuuya the railgun and tells him to abandon it and escape to safety should something bad happens during the test and destroy it to prevent other nations from copying it but he assures her that both he and railgun will come back. As he heads back to his quarters, he discovers Cryska and Inia being ganged up by a group of young Soviet pilots. The pilots express their hatred for Russians like Cryska and Inia due to the fact when the Soviet Union fell to the BETA, the Russians were the first to get refuge in Alaska while they, the Georgians and Kazakhs, were left behind and were forced to fight the BETA themselves. Cryska is unable to defend Inia due to a serious headache. When one of the pilots attempts to rape Inia, Yuuya attacks him. The pilots are about to surround Yuuya when their commanding officer orders them to stand down and leave. The next day, Ibrahim briefs the Argos, Idar and Bao-Feng Flight crews on where they will be doing their tests during an upcoming BETA invasion and introduces the woman whose battalion will be protecting them, Lieutenant Colonel Fikatsia Latrova of the Zhar Battalion, the officer who saved Yuuya, Cryska and Inia.
9	"Falling Tears"; Transliteration: "Rakurui" (Japanese: 落涙)	Seo Hye-jin	Takashi Aoshima	27 August 2012
Latrova tells the UN Flight crews to do their tests while her battalion protects them and not to interfere with her job. Cryska, now better but seemingly having no memory of the events of yesterday, tortures one of the Zhar Battalion pilots who attacked them and warns them to stay away from her and Inia or she will kill them. On the day of the test, Yuuya is nervous since this will be his first real battle, no making things better with the Zhar pilots mocking him but the rest of Argos crew ensures they will protect while he tests the railgun. As the BETA invades the coast, Yui realize something is wrong when she notices there is not enough ground forces protecting the Flight crews. Yui asks her Soviet counterpart to call for reinforcements, unaware that reinforcements won't come as the Soviet higher ups wants the railgun test to fail even at the cost of Latrova's battalion. Realizing they will be overrun soon, Yuuya convinces Latrova to order everyone to fall back so he has the clear to fire the railgun, which she does after realizing what her superior's plan in sacrificing her pilots. With everyone falling back, Yuuya fires the railgun which destroys all of the invading BETA forces. As everyone celebrates, Yui tells Yuuya that she's glad he's safe and tells him to return to base.
10	"Premonition"; Transliteration: "Yochō" (Japanese: 予兆)	Daisuke Tsukushi	Kiyoko Yoshimura	3 September 2012
Yuuya is given a heroes welcome at the Kamchatka base but the Zhar pilots don't see him as one when they were the ones doing the fighting. Realizing they are right, Yuuya asks Yui for a TSF melee combat in the next TSF test. As he's put on standby, Yuuya encounters Latrova, who thanks him for saving their lives and gives him some advice before her second in command, Natasha Ivanova, fetches her. With the railgun being in repairs and his TSF still under maintenance, Yui decides she will take over Yuuya in the next live battle test. However, the President of the company contracted to build Japan's newest TSF insist Yuuya being in the next test. Latrova briefs her pilots, who she considers like her children as she hopes to find her son before her superiors give the Zhar Battalion their next mission. As the UN Flight crews and Zhar Battalion does another sortie against the BETA, which they find it strange they are fighting the remnants of the last attack. Much to everyone's shock, the BETA have another force coming underground which arrives near the Kamchatka base.
11	"BETA Offensive"; Transliteration: "BETA Shingeki" (Japanese: BETA進撃)	Yoshihide Ibata	Katsuhiko Chiba	10 September 2012
As the BETA travel to the base, the Soviet commander tells all but the Soviet TSFs to retreat to an area further than usual, with the intention of using the Soviet forces to buy time. With respect to this, the commander issues that all personnel in the base evacuate, leaving everything behind. Lt. Dahl and Yui confirm their suspicions that the evacuation is all but a ploy for the Soviet to get their hands on the Type 99. Yui evades Soviet troops and plans to blow up the Type 99. The Soviets altered the self-destruct code, rendering it incapable of being blown up. Suddenly, some BETA have already reached the base.
12	"The End of the Fight to the Death"; Transliteration: "Shitō no hate" (Japanese: 死闘の果て)	Kōji Yoshikawa	Hiroshi Yamaguchi	17 September 2012
Yui is trapped in the abandoned supply base, and she plans to lure the BETA to the cannon's core module, taking her with it. Meanwhile the Soviet command, actively jamming all radio communications from the UN command, is joyous at the prospect of obtaining the type 99. The BETA infiltrates the hangar and nearly kill Yui when Yuuya and Stella arrive timely and saves her. Yui continues her plan to blow up the Type 99. Simultaneously, the main BETA force arrive and are heading toward them.
13	"The Value of Choice"; Transliteration: "Sentaku no taika" (Japanese: 選択の対価)	Daisuke Kurose	Hiroshi Yamaguchi	24 September 2012
Yuuya uses the Type 94 to destroy the Type 99. Disobeying Yui's request, he destroys all but its core module, which will make reconstructing it again easier. The Soviet command, aware that they are trying to salvage the cannon, orders the base to be completely blown up by bombers. In their escape, the Type 94's arm, carrying the module, was bitten off. Yuuya, carrying Yui inside his TSF, can't fight for the reason that Yui will hurt herself as she is not wearing a fortified suit. Yuuya transfers Yui to Stella's TSF due to his fear that the TSF has already sustained heavy damage. Yuuya and Stella use the base's runway for takeoff. However only Stella was able to takeoff as Yuuya's TSF is already too damage. Yuuya decides to stay and fight till his last.
14	"A Pilot's Honour"; Transliteration: "Eji no ichibun" (Japanese: 衛士の一分)	Akira Shimizu	Hiroshi Yamaguchi	30 September 2012
Yuuya's TSF is already critically damaged and is no longer able to fly. Before he is finished off, the Zhar Battalion arrives timely and save him. The bombers arrive and start blowing up the base, but the unexpected arrival of laser-class BETAs wipe them out. With Yuuya's TSF unable to fly, Lt. Latrova orders her battalion to escort him to safety, while the rest will attempt to flank the laser-class BETAs. An unknown and very powerful TSF is detected approaching them from the rear, and Latrova stays back to confront it. The mysterious TSF intercepts and kills her. In Alaska, the UN force mourns Yuuya's death, with Yui mourning the most. In a miracle, Yuuya's TSF appears in the horizon, walking in its damaged state. Fast forward, and the XFJ project unveils its newest creation, the XFJ-01a, Shiranui Second. Vincent tells Yuuya that the whole Zhar battalion was annihilated, but not after defeating the laser-class and the remaining BETA. They were named Heroes of the Soviet Union.
15	"Hot-on-heels Cross"; Transliteration: "Oisugaru jūjika" (Japanese: 追い縋る十字架)	Yoshifumi Sasahara	Takashi Aoshima	14 October 2012
In order to promote solidarity between nations, a military exercise called the Blue Flag was held, much to Yuuya and Yui's disgust. Meanwhile a party is held to celebrate the return of the Argos test flight. Yui cooks up a homemade meal for Yuuya, making him remember on how his mother used to make it. Out of the blue, Cui Yifei of the United Chinese Front appears and compliments Yuuya for his humility while also expressing her romantic interest. The next day, Cryska finds Yuuya in hopes that he knows where Inia is. She smiles (for the first time in the series) and tells him Inia likes him. They spend all night searching for Inia to no avail. That night, Yuuya sees his old flight mate and partner, Leo Kuze, who express his desire to best him.
16	"Pale Blue Flame"; Transliteration: "Aozameta homura" (Japanese: 蒼ざめた焔)	Daisuke Tsukushi	Katsuhiko Chiba	21 October 2012
After meeting with Yuuya again, Leo expresses intent on ending Project XFJ by beating it with supposedly superior American technology. Leo and his girlfriend Sharon Heim visit a bar where they meet Vincent once more. Vincent tells him that Yuuya has changed for the better, but Leo blocks him off saying that he has not forgotten what Yuuya did to him years back. In the morning of Blue Flag exercises, Idar Flight is pitted against Slechtvalk Flight. In what appears to be unbelievable, the Scarlet twins destroy the whole flight within ten minutes, a colossal feat. In the afternoon, Argos test flight is pitted against Bao Feng test flight, where the former is outmatched by the teamwork of the latter. Knowing that Cui wants him to fight her one-on-one, Yuuya subjects to it. Initially being outmatched by the Chinese TSF's brute force, Yuuya uses the Type 94 2's more agile movements to turn the tide and win the match. In another scene, the twins are shown to be submerged inside a tank due to their slightly unsatisfactory performance.
17	"Dark Recollection"; Transliteration: "Honoguraki tsuioku" (Japanese: 仄暗き追憶)	Akihiro Izumi	Yūko Kakihara	28 October 2012
While submerged in the tank, Cryska reminisces on her lonely childhood, how she met Inia, and their first meeting with Lt. Jerry Sandek. The Blue Flag exercises are in full swing, and the USA's Infinity flight demonstrates its Raptor with its advanced stealth technology against Bao Feng flight, and the latter is easily defeated within 4 minutes. After the fight, Yuuya meets the Scarlet Twins where he finds out that both twins share similar feelings for Yuuya, and Cryska wants to find out why. Yuuya tells him it might be because they share the same stubborn and perfectionist personality and she agrees. Their talk is disturbed by Cui while Yui sees everything and runs away with jealousy. Later that night Yuuya finds Yui in a bar and he asks her for Japanese sword-fighting lessons. Leo interrupts them and threatens Yuuya to tell him about his military history, which the latter punches him for. A bar fight ensues and the MP arrive, forcing them to escape.
18	"The Sound of Twisted Wings"; Transliteration: "Yugami no haoto" (Japanese: 歪みの羽音)	Hazuki Mizumoto	Kiyoko Yoshimura	4 November 2012
In 2000, Yuuya and his team are testing the F-22 Raptor. Yuuya strives to push the Raptor to the limit, which gets their Squad leader killed by accident. This is revealed to be the reason Leo bears a grudge on Yuuya. Yuuya reveals this to Inia, and she tells him that no one should blame anyone in an accident. That night Vincent, who won the bet of Argos winning their first fight, treats everyone for drinks. Yuuya chats with Natalie, the bartender, about his friends. While going to the bar, Yui meets Cui and the latter tells her to forget about Yuuya as she will never understand him. Cryska and Inia meet with Sandek who reveals that he has plans for Yuuya.
19	"Deep Green"; Transliteration: "Fukamidori" (Japanese: 深緑)	Fumio Maezono	Takashi Aoshima	11 November 2012
To quell the increasing rivalries between the nations competing in Blue Flag, the high ranking officers involved in the Prominence project decide to send the test pilots on a wilderness backpacking trip. While walking towards their objective, Argos, Idar, Bao Feng, and Infinity converge on a hot spring. They have dinner together and enjoy the spring. While relaxing, VG and Vincent get beaten up by Lt. Blazer, Inia and Cryska meet Yuuya on the hot pool naked, and Cui continues her rivalry with Yui.
20	"The World Bares its Fangs"; Transliteration: "Kiba o muku sekai" (Japanese: 牙を剥く世界)	Seiya Numata	Hiroshi Yamaguchi	25 November 2012
Cui offers Argos flight to a practice fight to prepare for their upcoming fight with Infinity in exchange for a date with Yuuya. Mysterious men posing as contractors arrive at the base, disguised as the military. Upon infiltrating, they kill a huge number of military personnel and seize control of several TSFs. In addition, they capture all the top officials and cut off all communications, prompting Yuuya to return to the base. Yui barely survives the attack and meets up with Cryska. The mysterious men announce themselves as the Refugee Liberation Front. Natalie, revealing herself as one of the RLF, confront Yuuya, Cui, and Tarisa and announce their plans on changing the world. As she was about to mention something about the US's secret research, she is killed by one of her own for revealing too much. Yuuya creates a diversion and the trio escape.
21	"The Future Tears Open"; Transliteration: "Sakeru mirai" (Japanese: 裂ける未来)	Yoshihide Ibata; Michinori Shiga	Katsuhiko Chiba	2 December 2012
The RLF take control of an underground research facility that is trying to breed BETAs. Argos test flight, Cryska, and Cui, being uncaptured, attempts to retake the base using the remaining TSF. Meanwhile, the RLF have achieved full control of the base. Sandek escapes and they pilot to the Soviet base for resupply. Lt. Dahl, who stayed at the commander center to send a distress call, meets some RLF members who plead him to fight their cost. Idar Test Flight is destroyed by the RFL TSF, and only Inia escapes thanks to Infinity test flight. The remaining TSF rushes to regroup in an area, but are intercepted by RLF TSFs, led by Ozlem Saner.
22	"Untainted Revenge"; Transliteration: "Kegare naki hōfuku" (Japanese: 汚れ無き報復)	Akira Shimizu	Takashi Aoshima	9 December 2012
Badly outnumbered, Yuuya volunteers to fight all 24 TSFs himself to buy time for the rest of Argos to escape. While he destroys many of them, he is soon surrounded; he is however saved by the timely intervention of Inia. The rest of them return, citing that they saw and followed Inia. With the tables turned, Ozlem executes a suicide attack. Mariem, one of the RLF, confronts Dahl and pleads that he join them; when she receives news of her sister's death, she tries to kill Dahl but fails. The RLF announces to the world and announces their demands. In addition, they announce to the whole world of the US secret BETA research facility (where they released all the BETA) and the Red shift, a last ditch plan that incorporates Hydrogen bombs buried beneath Alaska to create a new defense line in case of a BETA invasion. However this will mean the mass extermination of all Soviet citizens leaving near the area. Yuuya plans to steal weapons from a Soviet patrol base, citing guerrilla reasons. Major Christopher, the head of the RLF invasion, initiates his own plan.
23	"The Victory Song of the Dead"; Transliteration: "Shiseru-mono-tachi no gaika" (Japanese: 屍せる者たちの凱歌)	Atsushi Nakayama	Kiyoko Yoshimura	16 December 2012
The remaining pilots refuel and restock at the patrol station. They will attempt to get communications back online to give the US and USSR a visual of the BETA invasion. Returning to the base, they are confronted by the RLF led by Christopher and a chase ensues, with the team attempting to stop the BETA. Major Christopher reveals himself to be an Allegiant, a group of people who worship the BETA as gods, and refuses to help in the BETA attack. Seeing that they were used, the remaining RLF commit suicide to maintain their dignity. Leo and Sharon join the fight. In a desperate effort, Sandek gives the order for the Scarlet twins to activate Prafka, a state of mind that greatly heightens their piloting skills. The twins wake up in a shared unconscious, and Cryska wonders what happened to their bodies.
24	"White Darkness"; Transliteration: "Shiroi yami" (Japanese: 白い闇)	Masaomi Andō	Kiyoko Yoshimura	23 December 2012
As the twins activate their Prafka, Christopher activates an unknown device in an attempt to gain control of them. Instead of gaining control, it drives the twins berserk and they crush Christopher. Under some heavy hypnosis, the twins go on a rampage and mistakes everyone as the enemy. It dismantles Tarisa's TSF, and nearly defeats Yui. Sandek informs Yuuya that for some reason he is the only one that can stop them, lest the twins will destroy everything in sight. Seeking to give the twins what everyone around him has given him, he drops his weapon and allow the twins to impale him. The impaling shocks the twins back to reality. The blade misses Yuuya by mere centimeters and he is shown unscathed. Lt. Dahl with some Soviet special forces retake command of the HQ. The master, the mysterious leader of the RLF, acknowledges the plan's failure and sets his eyes on Japan. With the invasion repelled, the rest of the world is calling for an investigation of the Red Shift. Yui is sent back to Japan, with the possibility of the XFJ Project cancelled. Yui tells Dahl she will return to Yukon. Infinity test leaves for the US. Yuuya sees Yui, and they give their final salutes to each other. As Yui leaves, Cryska finds her and tells her of her romantic feelings toward Yuuya, which Yui replies that they will be rivals in love.
