= Flowers (video game series) =

Series of Japanese visual novel video games

- Le Volume sur Printemps cover art, featuring (left to right) Rikka, Suou and Mayuri
- Genre: Visual novel
- Developer: Innocent Grey
- Publishers: JP: Innocent Grey, Prototype; WW: JAST USA
- Artist: Miki Sugina
- Writer: Hatsumi Shimizu
- Composer: Manyo
- Platforms: Microsoft Windows, PlayStation Portable, PlayStation Vita, Android, PlayStation 4
- First release: Flowers: Le Volume sur Printemps; 18 April 2014
- Latest release: Flowers: Le Volume sur Hiver; 15 September 2017

Flowers is a series of yuri-themed visual novel video games developed by Innocent Grey. The first entry, Flowers: Le Volume sur Printemps, was released in 2014; three more games were released in 2015, 2016, and 2017.

While the company has previously released visual novels for adult audiences with 18+ content, the Flowers is distinguished by its broader appeal and the absence of any (overt) sexual content, while still remaining a game series in the romance genre. (Note: The games in the series feature various openly queer characters involved in various form of lesbian interaction, but most of romantic interactions are deliberately limited to depicting "strong emotional bonds between girls."). This is partly due to the use of Class S yuri Maria-sama ga Miteru as a primary source of inspiration, and partly due to the desire to create a work that would appeal to a wide range of people, regardless of age or preference. For the same reason, the franchise is located outside the fictional shared universe of the company's other games.

== Titles ==
=== Video games ===
- Flowers: Le Volume sur Printemps is the first game in the series. It was released for Microsoft Windows on 18 April 2014, and by Prototype for PlayStation Portable and PlayStation Vita on 9 October 2014. The game was released in English for Microsoft Windows on 17 August 2016.
- Flowers: Le Volume sur Été is the second game in the series. It was released for Microsoft Windows on 17 April 2015, and by Prototype for PlayStation Portable and PlayStation Vita on 22 October 2015. The game was released in English for Microsoft Windows on 15 July 2018 with a Steam release planned for 25 July 2018.
- Flowers: Le Volume sur Automne is the third game in the series. It was released for Microsoft Windows on 27 May 2016, and by Prototype for PlayStation Vita on 17 November 2016. An English release was announced on 5 July 2018.
- Flowers: Le Volume sur Hiver is the fourth game in the series. It was released for Microsoft Windows on 15 September 2017, and on 16 March 2018 for PlayStation Vita.
- Flowers: Les Quatre Saisons is a collection of all four games. It was released for the PlayStation 4 on 7 March 2019 in Japan.

=== Other media ===
In addition to the video games, other media based on the series has been released: Six audio dramas have been published, as part of the limited editions of the Microsoft Windows and console versions of each game; the games' music has been published as three soundtrack albums; and two fanbooks based on the first two games have been released.

== Development ==
The Flowers series is developed by Innocent Grey, with art by Miki Sugina. Unlike their previous games, the developers decided to not focus on characters' deaths, instead depicting female students' everyday life, and how they cooperate to solve mysteries. Even prior to the first game's release, it was decided that there would be four games, representing the four seasons.

During their panel at Anime Expo in July 2015, JAST USA announced that they would localize and publish the first game in late 2015; the localized demo was eventually released in February 2016, with the full game planned for both physical and digital release in March 2016. Due to translation errors, JAST USA had to delay the game to allow time for heavy editing and quality assurance; the game was eventually released in English in August 2016.

== Reception ==
Famitsu review scores
Game	Famitsu
Flowers: Le volume sur printemps	31/40
Flowers: Le volume sur été	33/40
Flowers: Le volume sur automne	33/40
Flowers: Le volume sur hiver	33/40

The series has been well received by critics. Marcus Estrada of Hardcore Gamer called Primtemps's release "great news for yuri fans", and described the series' artwork as "gorgeous".
