= Welcome to the Ballroom =

Japanese manga and anime series

- Cover of volume 1

ボールルームへようこそ (Bōrurūmu e Yōkoso)
- Genre: Comedy drama, sports
- Manga
- Written by: Tomo Takeuchi
- Published by: Kodansha
- English publisher: NA: Kodansha Comics
- Magazine: Monthly Shōnen Magazine
- Original run: November 5, 2011 – present
- Volumes: 12
- Anime television series
- Directed by: Yoshimi Itazu
- Produced by: Tetsuya Kinoshita
- Written by: Kenichi Suemitsu
- Music by: Yuki Hayashi
- Studio: Production I.G
- Licensed by: BI: Anime Limited; NA: Ponycan USA
- Original network: MBS, Tokyo MX, BS11, Gunma TV
- Original run: July 8, 2017 – December 17, 2017
- Episodes: 24
- icon

Welcome to the Ballroom (Japanese: ボールルームへようこそ, Hepburn: Bōrurūmu e Yōkoso) is a Japanese manga series written and illustrated by Tomo Takeuchi. It tells the prototypical story of an aimless Japanese youth named Tatara Fujita, who, after a chance encounter, is plunged into the world of competitive dancing. An anime television series adaptation produced by Production I.G was broadcast from July to December 2017.

In North America, the manga has been licensed for English language release by Kodansha Comics.

== Plot ==
Third-year middle school student Tatara Fujita has no plans for his future or dreams, but tries to find something he can pursue for his whole life. With him being bullied and extorted, he is saved from delinquents by a man named Kaname Sengoku, a motorcycle-riding dance instructor. Tatara is entered into the Ogasawara Dance Studio in which he is shown the ropes of the world of dancesport.

== Characters ==
Tatara Fujita (富士田多々良, Fujita Tatara)
Voiced by: Shimba Tsuchiya
Tatara is a high school freshman. In his third year of middle school he did not know what he wanted to do in the future, nor had a hobby. He accidentally entered the Ogasawara Dance Studio after Sengoku saved him from the delinquents, and becomes hooked with dance. While he is difficult to be taught with words, Tatara is good at duplicating dance moves he has seen. His current partner is Chinatsu.
Kiyoharu Hyōdō (兵藤清春, Hyōdō Kiyoharu)
Voiced by: Nobuhiko Okamoto
A professional dancer and Shizuku's partner for 9 years, Hyōdō is a genius dancer who looks unmotivated at most times, but is serious when it comes to dance. His family owns a dance studio and his mother is the current coach.
Shizuku Hanaoka (花岡雫, Hanaoka Shizuku)
Voiced by: Ayane Sakura
A first-year high school student and Hyōdō's dancing partner. Shizuku went to the same middle school as Tatara.
Chinatsu Hiyama (緋山千夏, Hiyama Chinatsu)
Voiced by: Chinatsu Akasaki
A first-year high school student in Tatara's class. She is skilled at leading and is Tatara's partner.
Kaname Sengoku (仙谷要, Sengoku Kaname)
Voiced by: Toshiyuki Morikawa
A 23-year-old champion dancer specializing in Latin. He took Tatara under his tutelage.
Gaju Akagi (赤城賀寿, Akagi Gaju)
Voiced by: Kentarō Tomita
A remarkable Latin dancer and a high school freshman. He always wanted to be Shizuku's dancing partner.
Mako Akagi (赤城真子, Akagi Mako)
Voiced by: Sumire Morohoshi
A junior high school second year and Gaju's younger sister and dance partner. She was temporarily partnered with Tatara after her brother Gaju decided to partner with Shizuku.
Masami Kugimiya (釘宮正美, Kugimiya Masami)
Voiced by: Takahiro Sakurai
Tatara's rival and occasional training partner. His style of dancing can be described as elegant, strict, and "traditional" or old fashioned. He hides an insecure, sensitive, and overthinking personality behind his calm and contained persona. He trains under Marisa Hyōdō ever since he had a car accident. He becomes Tamie Idogawa's dancing partner.
Marisa Hyōdō (兵藤マリサ, Hyōdō Marisa)
Voiced by: Yūko Kaida
Kiyoharu's mother and a dance coach. She is a highly regarded celebrity and trained her son and Shizuku to becoming elite dancers. She later becomes Tatara's coach when Chinatsu becomes his dance partner.
Tamaki Tsuburaya (円谷環, Tsuburaya Tamaki)
Voiced by: Mamiko Noto
Owner of the Ogasawara Dancing Studio.
Karen Banba (番場可憐, Banba Karen)
Voiced by: Yūki Kodaira
An instructor at Ogasawara Dancing Studio.
Tomichika Jinbo (仁保友親, Jinbo Tomichika)
Voiced by: Chado Horī
An instructor at Ogasawara Dancing Studio.

== Media ==
=== Manga ===
Welcome to the Ballroom is written and illustrated by Tomo Takeuchi. The manga began in Kodansha's Monthly Shōnen Magazine in the December 2011 issue, published on November 5, 2011. The series went on hiatus in February 2016 due to the author's poor health, but returned in the February 2017 issue. The series went on another hiatus for two months from December 2017 due to the author's health, however, did not return during the expected timeframe, and was instead expected to return in April 2018, but due to further health issues, the manga remained on hiatus until further notice. On May 13, 2019, it was announced that Takeuchi was preparing to resume working on the manga, later announcing in the July 2019 issue of Monthly Shōnen Magazine that the series would return on July 5, 2019. In the February 2020 issue of Monthly Shōnen Magazine published on January 6, 2020, it was announced the series would be on an indefinite hiatus due to Takeuchi's continued decline in health. The series later resumed in the August 2020 issue of Monthly Shōnen Magazine published in July 2020, but took a one-month break in the November 2020 issue published in October 2020 due to "establishment of a new system and the replacement of assistants".

In March 2016, Kodansha Comics announced the English language release of the manga.

==== Volume list ====
No.	Original release date	Original ISBN	English release date	English ISBN
1	May 17, 2012	978-4063713299	September 27, 2016	978-1-63-236376-3
1. "Welcome to Ogasawara Dance Studio" (小笠原ダンススタジオへようこそ, Ogasawara Dansu Sutajio e Youkoso); 2. "Shadowing Basics" (シャドー・ベーシック, Shadō Bēshikku); 3. "Dance the Waltz" (ワルツを踊れ, Warutsu o Odore)
2	July 17, 2012	978-4-06-371339-8	November 29, 2016	978-1-63-236377-0
4. "The Mikasanomiya Cup" (三笠宮杯, Mikasanomiya Hai); 5. "Dancer's High" (ダンサーズ・ハイ, Dansāzu Hai); 6. "Partners" (パートナー, Pātonā); 7. "Tatara on Stage" (たたらの舞台, Tatara no Butai)
3	November 16, 2012	978-4-06-371354-1	February 21, 2017	978-1-63-236405-0
8. "The Tenpei Cup" (天平杯, Tenpei Hai); 9. "Reality" (現実, Genjitsu); 10. "Target" (ターゲット, Tāgetto); 11. "The Flower and the Picture Frame" (花と額縁, Hana to Gakubuchi); Extra Heat: "Ogasawara Dance Studio Girl Talk" (小笠原ダンススタジオガールズトーク, Ogasawara Dansu Sutajio Gāruzu Tōku)
4	April 17, 2013	978-4-06-371373-2	March 21, 2017	978-1-63-236406-7
12. "Gaju Akagi" (赤城賀寿, Akagi Gaju); 13. "Voltage" (ボルテージ, Borutēji); 14. "Radiation" (伝播, Denpa); 15. "Special Variation" (特別振り付け, Tokubetsu Furitsuke); 16. "Judgment" (判定, Hantei)
5	September 17, 2013	978-4-06-371388-6	May 23, 2017	978-1-63-236407-4
17. "You're Not Behind" (遅くない, Osokunai); 18. "New Faces" (出会い, Deai); 19. "Lessons" (レッスン, Ressun); 20. "What a Weirdo" (変な子, Henna Ko); 21. "Basic" (ベーシック, Bēshikku)
6	April 17, 2014	978-4-06-371413-5	July 11, 2017	978-1-63-236446-3
22. "Snap the Lead" (男女逆転, Danjo Gyakuten); 23. "Form Up" (結成, Kessei); 24. "Give and Take" (譲歩の活路, Jōho no Katsuro); 25. "So Sneaky" (ずるい, Zurui); 26. "Know Thyself" (自覚せよ, Jikaku Seyo)
7	November 17, 2014	978-4-06-371450-0	September 12, 2017	978-1-63-236520-0
27. "Advancing" (途上, Tojō); 28. "Grand Prix" (グランプリ, Guran Puri); 29. "Strange"; 30. "Awhirl on Four Legs" (4本足の眩暈, 4 Pon Ashi no Memai); 31. "Karuizawa Training Camp" (軽井沢合宿, Karuizawa Gasshuku); 32. "The Bucking Horse, Bridled" (気負けの荒馬, Kimake no Arauma); Extra Heat: "What if We Genderswap the Leaders and Partners" (「リーダーとパートナーあべこべでどう組んだらいいんだよ!!」の巻, "Rīdā to Pātonā Abekobe de Dō Kundara Iin dayo!!" no Maki)
8	October 16, 2015	978-4-06-371468-5	November 14, 2017	978-1-63-236521-7
33. "Blind" (ブラインド, Buraindo); 34. "Self-Expression" (表現者, Hyōgen Sha); 35. "The Tokyo Tournament" (都民大会, Tomin Taikai); 36. "Entry No. 13" (背番号13, Sebangō 13)
9	June 23, 2017	978-4-06-392588-3	January 30, 2018	978-1-63-236580-4
37. "The Vase and the Keg of Beer" (花瓶とビア樽, Kabin to Bia Taru); 38. "Chinatsu and Akira" (千夏と明, Chinatsu to Akira); 39. "Homecoming"; 40. "Zero-Sum Game" (ゼロ和ゲーム, Zero wa Gēmu); 41. "Common Ground" (着地点, Ki Chiten)
10	January 17, 2020	978-4-06-518385-4	October 27, 2020	978-1-63-236581-1
42. "His Insight, Their Progress" (気付きと進化, Kizuki to Shinka); 43. "Captivity" (逼塞者, Hissoku-sha); 44. "The Metropolitan Tournament Finals" (都民大会A級戦 決勝, Tomin Taikai Ē-kyu-sen Kesshō); 45. "Companion Galaxies" (隣人 宇宙が如し, Rinjin Uchū ga Gotoshi); 46. "The Taming of the Shrew" (じゃじゃ馬ならし, Jajaumanarashi); 47. "The Double Lead's Got a Shot" (Wリーダーの勝機, Daburu Rīdā no Shōki); 48. "Reawakened" (回帰, Kaiki)
11	April 16, 2021	978-4-06-522780-0	October 25, 2022	978-1-63-236582-8
49. "The Judges" (都民大会A級戦 決勝, Tomin Taikai A-kyū-sen Kesshō); 50. Tomin Taikai A-kyū-sen Kesshō ② (都民大会A級戦 決勝②); 51. "Results" (都民大会A級戦 決勝③, Tomin Taikai A-kyū-sen Kesshō ③); 52. Kekka Happyō ① (結果発表①); 53. "New Competitors" (結果発表②, Kekka Happyō ②); 54. "Night of the Floating Mosquitoes" (結果発表③, Kekka Happyō ③); 55. "Lookers On" (蚊が飛ぶ夜, Ka ga Tobu Yoru); 56. "White Curtain" (見やる者, Miyaru Mono); 57. "Into the Unknown" (白裂, Hakuretsu)
12	November 4, 2022	978-4-06-529436-9	—	—
58. "The Underachievers" (杳として, Yōto Shite); 59. "The Overachievers" (劣等生, Rettōsei); 60. "Nice Guys" (優等生, Yūtōsei); 61. "A Second Wind" (新風, Shinpū); 62. "Looking Back, Moving Forward" (立ち返り路を進む, Tachikaeri-michi o Susumu); 63. "The World Changes" (世界 変わりゆく, Sekai Kawari Yuku); 64. "Collapse" (瓦解, Gakai); 65. "Collapse Part 2" (瓦解②, Gakai ②); 66. "A Fresh Start" (再出発, Sai Shuppatsu)

=== Anime ===
It was announced in the February 2017 issue of the Monthly Shōnen Magazine that the series would receive an anime television series adaptation. The series is directed by Yoshimi Itazu and written by Kenichi Suemitsu, with animation produced by Production I.G, character designs by Takahiro Kishida and music composed by Yuki Hayashi. Tetsuya Kinoshita produced the anime. It had its world premiere at the 2017 Anime Expo on July 2, 2017, later premiering on MBS and other channels on July 8, 2017. From episodes 1–11, Unison Square Garden performed the opening theme song "10% Roll, 10% Romance" (originally "Chandelier Waltz"), while Mikako Komatsu performed the ending theme song "Maybe the Next Waltz". From episode 12 onwards, the opening theme song was "Invisible Sensation" by Unison Square Garden while the ending theme song is "Swing Heart Direction" by Mikako Komatsu. Amazon began streaming the anime series on their now-defunct Anime Strike service in U.S. and on Amazon Video worldwide one day before the first episode aired in Japan, with the following episodes streamed as soon as they aired in Japan. The series ran for 24 episodes. Anime Limited announced that they had acquired the series for release in the United Kingdom and Ireland.

==== Episode list ====
No.	Title	Original release date
1	"Welcome to Ogasawara Dance Studio" "Ogasawara Dansu Sutajio e Yōkoso" (小笠原ダンススタジオへようこそ)	July 8, 2017
Tatara Fujita is a third year in middle school student with no plans for his future. As he heads home after being scolded by his teacher about having no future plans, he spots his crush Shizuku Hanaoka walking to a dance studio. Tatara heads towards the studio, but is attacked by bullies. A man on a motorcycle, Kaname Sengoku, walks up to and intimidates them, and forces Tatara to enter the dance studio with him. After finding out that Shizuku was a ballroom dancer, Tatara tries to dance with her but runs away after realising that he was nothing like Shizuku. Tatara returns to the dance studio the next day after viewing a pre-recorded dance competition featuring Kaname, but turns down the offer to join the dance studio due to financial issues. Kaname and Tamaki Tsuburaya decide to allow Tatara to make delayed payments after realising he had the confidence and motivation to become a professional dancer. Kaname decides to teach Tatara the Box, thinking he would pass out after twenty minutes, but Tatara ends up practising the Box for the entire night.
2	"Kiyoharu Hyodo" "Hyōdō Kiyoharu" (兵藤清春)	July 16, 2017
3	"Dance the Waltz" "Warutsu o Odore" (ワルツを踊れ)	July 23, 2017
4	"Dancer's High" "Dansāzu Hai" (ダンサーズ・ハイ)	July 30, 2017
5	"Partners" "Pātonā" (パートナー)	July 30, 2017 (Note: Episodes 4 and 5 aired as an hour special.)
6	"Line of Dance" "Rain obu Dansu" (ライン・オブ・ダンス)	August 13, 2017 (Note: Episode 6 was delayed on MBS to August 20, therefore Tokyo MX aired the episode on August 13 at 23:30.)
7	"The Tenpei Cup" "Tenpei Hai" (天平杯)	August 20, 2017 (Note: Due to Episode 6 being delayed on MBS, Tokyo MX aired Episode 7 on August 20 at 23:30.)
8	"Reality" "Genjitsu" (現実)	August 27, 2017
9	"A Flower in a Frame" "Hana to Gakubuchi" (花と額縁)	September 3, 2017
10	"Voltage" "Borutēji" (ボルテージ)	September 10, 2017
11	"Final Evaluation" "Hyōka" (評価)	September 17, 2017
12	"Encounters" "Deai" (出会い)	September 24, 2017
13	"Matchmaking" "Omiai" (お見合い)	October 1, 2017
14	"Formation" "Kessei" (結成)	October 8, 2017
15	"Taming a Wild Horse" "Jajaumanarashi" (じゃじゃ馬ならし)	October 15, 2017
16	"Four Legs" "Yonhon Ashi" (四本足)	October 22, 2017
17	"Performer" "Hyōgen-sha" (表現者)	October 29, 2017
18	"Entry #13" "Sebangō 13" (背番号13)	November 5, 2017
19	"Rivals" "Raibaru" (敵(ライバル))	November 12, 2017
20	"Friends" "Tomodachi" (友達)	November 19, 2017
21	"The Door" "Doa" (扉(ドア))	November 26, 2017
22	"Leader Partner" "Rīdā Pātonā" (リーダーパートナー)	December 3, 2017
23	"Tradition and Evolution" "Dentō to Shinka" (伝統と進化)	December 10, 2017
24	"Welcome to the Ballroom" "Bōrurūmu e Yōkoso" (ボールルームへようこそ)	December 17, 2017

== Reception ==
Welcome to the Ballroom was nominated for the 6th Manga Taishō. The series ranked ninth on the 2013 Kono Manga ga Sugoi! Top 20 Manga for Male Readers survey. It was placed seventh in Zenkoku Shotenin ga Eranda Osusume Comic 2013, a 2013 ranking of the top 15 manga recommended by Japanese bookstores. It is nominated for the 8th Manga Taishō. Volume 4 sold 53,892 copies in the week of April 14 to 20, 2013.
