= Kanako Tateno =

Japanese voice actress

- 立野 香菜子
- Born: January 4, 1980 (age 46)
- Occupation: Voice actress
- Years active: 1999-present
- Agent: Aoni Production

Kanako Tateno (立野 香菜子, Tateno Kanako; born January 4. 1980) is a Japanese voice actress from Miyagi Prefecture. She is affiliated with Aoni Production. Her major roles include Yumi Mamiya in Onmyō Taisenki, Shirayuki-hime in Fairy Musketeers, and Itsuki in Wish Upon the Pleiades. She voices Corrine in Tales of Symphonia and Elisa Dolittle Naruse in Tokimeki Memorial 4.

== Filmography ==
=== Anime ===
List of voice performances in anime
| Year | Series | Role | Notes | Source |
|---|---|---|---|---|
| 1999 | Shūkan Storyland | Children | | |
| 2000 | Hand Maid May | Kyoko Masuda | | |
| 2000 | Legendary Gambler Tetsuya | Boy | | |
| 2001 | Alien Nine | Miyu Tamaki | OVA | |
| 2001 | Captain Tsubasa | Masaru Hinata | 2001 TV series | |
| 2001 | Crush Gear Turbo | Shinnosuke Gomano, Shinomiya Rin, Crush Mary, Aida Koume, others | | |
| 2001 | Rave Master | Lilith Nina, Chino, Melodia | | |
| 2002 | Kanon | Nurse, students | | |
| 2002 | Forza! Hidemaru | Florence | | |
| 2002 | Witch Hunter Robin | Risa Kayama | | |
| 2002 | Fortune Dogs | Kosuke | | |
| 2003 | One Piece | Longo | Eps. 139-143 | |
| 2003 | L/R: Licensed by Royalty | Julian | | |
| 2003 | Machine Robo Rescue | Ryo Mizushima | | |
| 2003 | Crush Gear Nitro | Hajime Kondo, Funaki-sensei, Arudonsa | | |
| 2003 | Beast Fighter - The Apocalypse | Leviathan | | |
| 2003 | The World of Narue | Kyoko Kudo | | |
| 2004 | Battle B-Daman | Berkhart | | |
| 2004 | Onmyō Taisenki | Yumi Mamiya, Kanro no Kuradayū) | | |
| 2004 | Viewtiful Joe | Children | | |
| 2005 | Fairy Musketeers Little Red Hiding Hood | Shirayuki Hime | OVA | |
| 2005 | Iriya no Sora, UFO no Natsu | Kiyomi | OVA | |
| 2005 | Patalliro Saiyuki! | Nata San Taishi | | |
| 2006 | Ergo Proxy | Gatari, Policenyan, others | | |
| 2006 | Fairy Musketeers Little Red Riding Hood | Shirayuki Hime | TV series | |
| 2006 | Chocotto Sister | Masami Kozumi | | |
| 2006 | Penelope tete en l'air | Drugstore old lady | | |
| 2007 | Moonlight Mile | Reporters, Wife, Dancer | | |
| 2007 | Dennō Coil | Boy | | |
| 2007 | Moonlight Mile 2nd Season -Touch Down- | Female operator | | |
| 2008 | Porphy no Nagai Tabi | Rune | | |
| 2008 | Onegai My Melody: Kirara | Star Pink | | |
| 2008 | Yozakura Quartet | Children | | |
| 2009 | Penelope tete en l'air second series | Drugstore old lady | | |
| 2011 | Wish Upon the Pleiades | Itsuki | ONA | |
| 2015 | Wish Upon the Pleiades | Itsuki | TV series | |

=== Theatrical animation ===
List of voice performances in anime feature films
| Year | Series | Role | Notes | Source |
|---|---|---|---|---|
| 2004 | Steamboy | John | | |
| 2005 | Air | Misuzu's classmate | | |

=== Video games ===
List of voice performances in video games
| Year | Series | Role | Notes | Source |
|---|---|---|---|---|
| 2002 | Disaster Report | Natsumi Higa | PS1/PS2 | |
| 2002 | Crush Gear Turbo | Aida Koume | PS1/PS2 | |
| 2002 | SD Gundam G-Generation NEO | La Mira Luna | PS1/PS2 | |
| 2002 | Nijiiro Dodge Ball: Otome Tachi no Seishun | Sena Jinbo | PS1/PS2 | |
| 2003 | Summon Night 3 | Kunon | PS2 | |
| 2003 | Tales of Symphonia | Korin | GC | |
| 2004 | Tales of Symphonia | Korin | PS2 | |
| 2004 | Magna Carta: Crimson Stigmata | Mano (child) | Also Portable in 2006 | |
| 2005 | Soulcalibur III | Amy | | |
| 2006 | Raw Danger! | Natsumi Higa | PS1/PS2 | |
| 2006 | Rune Factory: A Fantasy Harvest Moon | Cecilia | DS | |
| 2006 | Wrestle Angels Survivor | Nastasha Han, Cindy Wong | PS1/PS2 | |
| 2006 | Summon Night 4 | Kunon | PS2 | |
| 2008 | Rune Factory 2 | Cecilia, Roy | DS | |
| 2008 | Wrestle Angels Survivor 2 | Nastasha Han, Cindy Wong | PS1/PS2 | |
| 2008 | Wonderland Online | Maid no Aoi-san (Natsu-fuku) | Windows | |
| 2009 | Zettai Zetsumei Toshi 3: Kowareyuku Machi to Kanojo no Uta | Natsumi Higa | PSP | |
| 2009 | Tokimeki Memorial 4 | Elisa Dolittle Naruse | PSP | |
| 2010 | Senko no Ronde: Dis-United Order | Ranatasu | Xbox | |
| 2011 | ja:どきどきすいこでん | 八雲公佳 | PSP | |
| 2022 | アカシッククロニクル /Mobile Legends: Adventure | Hazuki | Mobile/PC | |
