= Kano (Japanese musician) =

Japanese musician and virtual YouTuber

Kano 鹿乃
- Born: December 24
- Origin: Japan
- Genres: J-Pop, Anison
- Years active: 2010–present
- Label: Imperial Records
- Website: kano-official.amebaownd.com

Kano (Japanese: 鹿乃; born December 24) is a Japanese musician and virtual YouTuber who is signed to Imperial Records. She began her artist activities as a doujin artist, uploading songs on the video-sharing website Nicovideo, before making her major debut in 2015 with the release of her single "Stella-rium". Her songs have been featured in anime series such as Wish Upon the Pleiades, Heavy Object, Azur Lane, and Uzaki-chan Wants to Hang Out!.

== Career ==
Kano's music activities began in 2010 when she began uploading songs on the Japanese video-sharing website Nicovideo. In 2015, she made her debut as a major artist with the release of her single "Stella-rium" on May 20; the title song is used as the opening theme of the anime series Wish Upon the Pleiades. Her second single, "Dear Brave" (ディアブレイブ), was released on November 18, 2015; the title song was used as the first ending theme of the anime series Heavy Object.

Kano released her first major album, Nowhere, on May 11, 2016. Her third single, "Nameless", was released on September 7, 2016, with the title track being used as the ending theme of the anime series Alderamin on the Sky. Her fourth single "Day by Day" was released on May 24, 2017; the title song is used as the ending theme of the anime series Sword Oratoria. Her second album, Alstroemeria (アルストロメリア), was released on December 20, 2017.

In 2018, it was announced that she would provide the voice bank for the Japanese version of the Chinese Vocaloid Luo Tianyi. On December 19, 2018, she released her third album, Rye.

On September 25, 2019, Kano released the mini-album Itsuka no Yakusoku o Kimi ni (いつかの約束を君に). This was followed by the release of the single "Hikari no Michishirube" (光の道標) on November 27, 2019; the title track was used as the ending theme of the anime series Azur Lane.

In 2020, Kano announced that she would debut as a Virtual YouTuber, with her 3D image being based on an avatar called "Bambi" that she has used on various media such as official artwork. This was followed by the release of her fourth album, Yuanfen, on March 4, 2020. She released the single "Nadamesukashi Negotiation" (なだめスかし Negotiation) on September 2, 2020; a duet version with voice actress Naomi Ōzora is used as the opening theme of the anime series Uzaki-chan Wants to Hang Out!.

== Discography ==
=== Singles ===
Title	Peak Oricon position
"Stella-rium": Release date: May 20, 2015	28
"Dear Brave" (ディアブレイブ): Release date: November 18, 2015	38
"Nameless": Release date: September 7, 2016	38
"Day by Day": Release date: May 24, 2017	41
"Hikari no Michishirube" (光の道標): Release date: November 27, 2019	32
"Nadamesukashi Negotiation" (なだめスかし Negotiation): Release date: September 2, 2020	24

=== Albums ===
Title	Peak Oricon position
Nowhere: Release date: May 11, 2016	11
Alstroemeria (アルストロメリア): Release date: December 20, 2017	50
Rye: Release date: December 19, 2018	39
Yuanfen: Release date: March 4, 2020	20

=== Mini-albums ===
Title	Peak Oricon position
Itsuka no Yakusoku o Kimi ni (いつかの約束を君に): Release date: September 25, 2019	57
