= Abyss of the Sacrifice =

2010 video game

- Developer(s): Intense
- Publisher(s): D3 Publisher
- Producer(s): Hiroshi Ogasawara
- Designer(s): Naoki Fukuda
- Writer(s): Yuuki Katahira, Sayuri Abe
- Platform(s): PlayStation Portable, Nintendo Switch, Microsoft Windows
- Release: PlayStation Portable: JP: February 4, 2010; Nintendo Switch, Microsoft Windows: WW: December 17, 2020
- Genre(s): Adventure, visual novel
- Mode(s): Single-player

Abyss of the Sacrifice (密室のサクリファイス, Misshitsu no Sakurifaisu) is a Japanese visual novel adventure game for the PlayStation Portable and by Intense and D3 Publisher. It was released on February 4, 2010. The game is described as a "trap adventure" (トラップアドベンチャー, Torappu Adobenchā). An enhanced version of the game for the Nintendo Switch and Microsoft Windows was released worldwide on December 17, 2020.

== Gameplay ==
Abyss of the Sacrifice has two modes of gameplay. The first mode requires little interaction on the player's part as much of the player's time will be spent on reading the text that appears on the game's screen. These lines of text represents either the inner thoughts of the characters or the conversation the characters are having with one another. After a stage has been completed, the player will be presented with a screen displaying the possible stages that the player can advance to. Stages that have been completed will be highlighted in blue whereas those that have not been played will be in orange. Each row of stages has a character's name attached to it which will determine which character will be the main character. As stages are completed, more stages will become available. The ending of the game will differ based on the stages that have been selected.

The second mode is more closely connected to adventure games. The player is tasked with the need to investigate different scenes to find clues and items. It is even possible to combine items together to create new items. The player will then try to solve the puzzles in the game using the information and items they have acquired.

== Plot ==
=== Setting ===
The story of Abyss of the Sacrifice takes place in an underground facility called "Foundation" (ファウンデーション, Faundēshon). It is not clear why the facility was built and there is no longer anyone above the ground that knows of its existence.

=== Characters ===
There are five main characters in Abyss of the Sacrifice. Miki (ミキ; voiced by: Kei Shindō) is a Japanese girl who is good at sports and was originally aiming to become a high jumper but due to an injury she received during a practice, she has given this up. Asuna (アスナ; voiced by: Eri Kitamura) is a Russian girl who appears before Miki covered in blood. Oruga (オルガ; voiced by: Shizuka Itō) is the daughter of a famous doctor and an honours student. She is familiar with some basics regarding medical treatment. Chloe (クロエ, Kuroe; voiced by: Yukana) is a very intelligent German girl and is skilled at cracking into computer systems. Jitka (イトカ, Itoka; voiced by: Asuka Ōgame) is a Slav who is able to see other people's pasts in her dreams.

== Release ==
A demo containing two stages from the game was released on January 12, 2010. An enhanced version of game for the Nintendo Switch and Microsoft Windows was released worldwide on December 17, 2020.
