= Tokimeki Memorial 4 =

2009 video game

- Developer: Konami
- Publisher: Konami
- Series: Tokimeki Memorial
- Platform: PlayStation Portable
- Release: JP: December 3, 2009
- Genre: Dating sim
- Mode: Single-player

Tokimeki Memorial 4 (ときめきメモリアル4, Tokimeki Memoriaru Fō) is a dating sim developed and published by Konami and the fourth game in the Tokimeki Memorial series. It is also the first original game in the series to debut on a portable system (the PSP).

The game celebrated the 15th anniversary of the Tokimeki Memorial franchise. A special edition package of the game included an OVA, the soundtrack, a character box, and sketches from the artists of the game.

The game featured the return of the Tree of Legend from the first Tokimeki Memorial game, as well as the return of the Kirameki High school setting, set 15 years after the first game.

== Main characters ==
Maki Hoshikawa (星川 真希, Hoshikawa Maki)

Voiced by: Asuka Ōgame

The female lead of Tokimeki Memorial 4, Maki is a compassionate, cheerful, sincere, and honest person who can get along with everyone and likes to help people around her. She becomes the class representative, later joins the student union, and subsequently serves as its president. Her hobbies include listening to J-pop music. Her closest friend is Tsugumi Godo. Maki first appears on the first day of class, seated next to the protagonist. Even if players don't date her, she will still help with a lot of things, especially with setting "special skills", which allows the player to obtain skills useful in variety of aspects.

Maki's storyline mainly revolves around her wish to become a nurse and hesitation that comes with it.

Yu Satsuki (皐月 優, Satsuki Yū)

Voiced by: Juri Takita

A student one year older than the protagonist and the president of Kirameki High School Student Union. She bears several similarities to Shiori Fujisaki, the main female lead of the first Tokimeki Memorial, and excels at everything she does. Due to the large load of work she is responsible for, she is very busy and seen carrying a folder all the time. Her closest friend is Kai Ryukoji.

In the beginning of her story, she invites the protagonist to join the student union. After he joins the union with Maki, Yu instructs them on what they need to learn in the student union. When the protagonist makes a good relationship with Yu, he knows her weakness, like she always loses her way, and her stories what he hasn't known. It is later revealed that Yu is similar to Shiori: Shiori is a relative of Yu and the inspirational figure that she has always looked up to since she was young. She believes that if she can become perfect like Shiori, she will be able to find the person she loves and confess her love to him under the legendary tree on the graduation day, like Shiori did. However, when her graduation day comes, she ends up not being courageous enough to confess to the protagonist (who is one year below her), and thus misses the opportunity she has always dreamed of.

In the end, on the graduation day of the protagonist, she will appear to confess her love to the protagonist under the legendary tree, saying that it does not matter even if it is not her graduation day. After all, the only thing that matters to her is the protagonist, not the legend, and she believes that they will be together always.

Like Shiori, Yu is the final character to end with in Tokimeki memorial 4. To pursue her route, player is required to have very high status points in every area, as well as to be able to gain admission to a first-rate university.

Tsugumi Godo (語堂 つぐみ, Godō Tsugumi)

Voiced by: Sayuri Yahagi

Tsugumi is Maki's closest friend who overly cares for Maki and is ready to do everything to protect her. She initially hates the protagonist for being friends with Maki and will continue to do so unless the player dates her to a certain point.

Tsugumi is talented in language and literature. She is often found reading books in the school library. She belongs to the Kirameki literature club. After she graduates, she also continues her education at a specialized school for language and literature. While she is academically excellent, she is bad at sports.

Tsugumi is neither soft-spoken nor gentle. On the other hand, she is morose and sulky, ready to snap at everyone who irritates her. She is also brave, as shown when she tries to protect Maki from a group of thugs. Due to these characteristics, Tsugumi is commonly characterised as the "tsundere" girl of Tokimeki Memorial 4.

Tsugumi's storyline is mainly about how she has to accept the fact that she and Maki have their own lives and that she could not protect Maki all the time.

Rhythmy Kyono (響野 里澄, Kyōno Rizumi)

Voiced by: Kana Hanazawa

A genius music prodigy, Rhythmy (a homonym of 'Rizumi') devotes all of energy for music composition. She is seen wearing headphones all the time, which makes people afraid to talk to her. She also does not talk much at all. As a result of her personality, she does not have many friends at school.

Rhythmy has excellent sense of hearing, as she can hear and distinguish every kind of sound, regardless of how far it is. Once, she even tells the protagonist the model of an airplane just by listening to its engine sound, despite the fact that the plane is so far away that the protagonist cannot even see it. Her incredible (and sometimes too good) sense of hearing is part of reasons why she has to wear headphones. She also likes quiet places as she will not have to hear and get disturbed by all kinds of sound.

Rhythmy's storyline is mainly about her composition based on her high school life. Because she does not do much at school besides spending time alone composing music, she has a hard time imagining how this piece of music will turn out. Her relationship with the protagonist helps her understand more and more what it means to be a high school student.

She also appears in Tokimeki Memorial 4 Mobile.

Kai Ryukoji (龍光寺 カイ, Ryūkōji Kai)

Voiced by: Chie Matsuura

The daughter and the sole heir of Ryukochi Zaibatsu, Kai is raised as a boy and is described as having masculine traits. She is good at fighting and does not hesitate to beat up anyone who annoys her. This makes her a frightening figure among the local thugs. Her closest friend is Yu Satsuki.

At school, Kai is a delinquent, hardly going to class or participating in any activities. During school, she spends most of her time taking a nap on the rooftop, chilling out at Kirameki riverside park, or going to the game arcade. Despite her delinquency, Kai does well in exams and often stays among the top of the class.

Kai's storyline is mainly about her decision to succeed Ryukochi Zaibatsu or to be a normal girl. Choosing the later will definitely go against her father's will and may eventually escalate to a familial feud. The protagonist will play an important role in helping her make the decision that is best for everyone.

Itsuki Maeda (前田 一稀, Maeda Itsuki)

Voiced by: Emiri Katō

Itsuki has a passion for sports, especially soccer. She is the Kirameki girls’ soccer club and is the best player on the team. She is always seen dribbling a soccer ball. Her closest friend is Miyako Okura.

In addition to her athletic skills, Itsuki is also good at mechanics, as it is related to her family's business.

Elisa Dolittle Naruse (エリサ・D(ドリトル)・鳴瀬, Erisa Doritoru Naruse)

Voiced by: Kanako Tateno

She transfers to Kirameki High School in the protagonist's second year. Although she has a blond hair and blue eyes, she is Japanese and of mixed heritage born in Miyagi Prefecture. She is very interested in the Japanese culture and has skill in Kendo. Fumiko Yanagi is her best friend.

Once the protagonist becomes close to Elisa, he will learn that she is very concerned about her mixed heritage. She feels that just because of her blond hair, she is different from other Japanese people, and will never be able to really blend in, despite her love in Japanese culture. For this reason, she is never seen wearing Yukata or Kimono, as she feels it will look bad on her. If the protagonist can get her to confess her love under the legendary tree at the end, she will be waiting there, wearing Kimino. She will thank the protagonist and say that because of him, she can finally believe that her appearances do not define who she truly is.

She also appears in Tokimeki Memorial 4 Mobile.

Aki Koriyama (郡山 知姫, Kōriyama Aki)

Voiced by: Umeka Shōji

Aki is an upperclassman who is extremely talented in chemistry. She always comes up with new recipes for supplemental nutrition and does not hesitate to distribute them to girls who are interested. The protagonist encounters her when she persuades him to try her new formula, which turns out to have adverse effects on the protagonist's health.

Although Aki spends most of her time researching, she is mature and caring. She often gives advice to the protagonist if he joins the chemistry club, and tries to take care of him. This is partly because she is very conscious about the fact that she is an upperclassman, which is reflected in her calling the protagonist "Kouhai" (underclassman) throughout the game.

It is revealed later on that Aki is so interested in making supplemental nutrition because her mother works hard to support the family, so she wants her to stay beautiful and young.

Fumiko Yanagi (柳 冨美子, Yanagi Fumiko)

Voiced by: Yuka Iguchi

Fumiko is a student in the broadcasting club who is social and loves having fun. She is clumsy, annd often runs into the protagonist for many times. She loves cute things and considers herself a cute person. Sometimes, she is seen dressed as an animal mascot walking around the school. Fumiko is fond of eating. She is easily frightened and dislikes places such as haunted houses.

== Secret characters ==
Miyako Okura (大倉 都子, Ōkura Miyako)

Voiced by: Misato Fukuen

Miyako is the protagonist's childhood friend and neighbor. She is generally a cheerful, straightforward, and impatient person. She helps the protagonist with a lot of things, including waking him up in the morning, bringing him his monthly allowance, and giving him information about other girls in Kirameki High School. Miyako always carries with her a bunny doll that she and the protagonist made when they were young. The bunny's appearance is a cameo of the reccurring Silent Hill object known as Robbie the Rabbit, and serves as a company in-joke.

At the beginning of the game, Miyako's roles are more like protagonist's male friends in previous Tokimeki Memorial games. Player can ask her girls' profile and their feelings towards the player just. She is initially not datable, but if the player asks her out for a certain number of times, she will eventually agree to date the protagonist.

Once the player starts dating Miyako, a series of events lead her to believe that the protagonist does not really care for her. As a result, she undergoes a marked change in behaviour. She becomes quiet, starts to dress in black, and always talks about scary things. She no longer tells the protagonist girls' information and stops bringing him monthly allowance. She also stalks the protagonist heavily, knowing when he goes out with other girls. If the protagonist dates any girl during this period, he will have to fight the evil spirit of the bunny doll. Miyako returns to her previous demeanour if the player continues dating her for a while. Even so, the player will no longer be able to ask her about girls. Also, the player will hardly be able to go home with other girls, given that he will have to fight the bunny before he could do so. Due to all mentioned, Miyako is considered the "yandere" girl of Tokimeki Memorial 4 and is the first one in Tokimeki Memorial series.

Rui Nanakawa (七河 瑠依, Nanakawa Rui)

Voiced by: Kaori Mizuhashi

The older sister of Tadashi and a student of Hibiki High School, which is the setting of Tokimeki Memorial 2. She is a cheerful person who can remain optimistic even in a time of crisis. She likes anime and video games, and considers herself an otaku. She disguises herself as Tadashi and infiltrates Kirameki High School to look for something she wants. She also likes drawing dōjin manga. During Christmas in the third year, the protagonist spends all night helping her with the manga that must be presented at the Comic Convention the day after.

Haruna Mizuki (水月 春奈, Mizuki Haruna)

Voiced by: Yūmi Kikuchi

A student one year younger than the protagonist who attends Kirameki part-time High School, Haruna uses the nickname “Haru” in her diary and hopes to share her feeling with someone. After the protagonist finds her diary, they begin exchanging diary entries each month. She works in a sweet shop every day and dreams of becoming a pâtissière.

== Supporting characters ==
- Manabu Kobayashi (小林 学, Kobayashi Manabu) Voiced by: Daisuke Sakaguchi
- Tadashi Nanakawa (七河 正志, Nanakawa Tadashi) Voiced by: Yūichi Nakamura
