= Yukiko Horiguchi =

Japanese animator and illustrator

- 堀口 悠紀子
- Born: 28 January 1983 (age 43); Kyoto, Japan
- Other name: Shiromizakana (白身魚)
- Occupations: Animator; animation director; character designer; illustrator
- Years active: 2003–present
- Known for: Employee of Kyoto Animation
- Notable work: Lucky Star; K-On!; Tamako Market

Yukiko Horiguchi (堀口 悠紀子, Horiguchi Yukiko; born 28 January 1983) is a Japanese animator and illustrator from Kyoto Prefecture who worked for the anime studio Kyoto Animation. When illustrating a light novel, she uses the pen name "Shiromizakana" (白身魚). She is best known as the character designer for the anime adaptations of K-On! and Lucky Star and as the illustrator of the light novel series Kokoro Connect.

She is the older sister of BUNBUN (also known as abec), the original character designer for the anime Sakura Quest and the illustrator of the light novel series Sword Art Online and Sword Art Online: Progressive. She is close to her brother and was once part of a doujinshi circle with him.

== Career ==
After graduating from junior college, Horiguchi joined Kyoto Animation in 2003. Her first position was as an animator for the television anime Crayon Shin-chan, and began work as a key animator for the first time on Episode 163 of Inuyasha. Her first work as a character designer was for Lucky☆Star. She has also worked on anime such as K-ON! and Tamako Market. In 2007, she illustrated her first light novel, and since then, she continued to do it for many works on the market.

Horiguchi's last credited work at Kyoto Animation was as the character designer and animation director on Tamako Market in 2013. Since then she decided to become a freelancer and work on different projects of anime and mainly as an illustrator of light novels.

== Works ==
=== Anime ===
- Lucky Star (2007) - character design, chief animation director
- K-On! (2009) - character design, chief animation director
- Tamako Market (2013) - character design, chief animation director
- Ano Hi no Kanojo-tachi (2018) - character design, animation director, original character designer for Miu Takigawa
- Hello World (2019) - character design
- Demons' Crest (2026) - character design
- Eiga Bocchi the Rock! Hoshi no Ashiato (2027) - character design

=== Light novel illustrations ===
- Lucky Star Yuruyuru Days
- Hayate no Gotoku! Nagi ga Tsukaima!? Yattoke Sekai Seifuku
- Tobira no Soto
- Zarathustra e no Kaidan
- Ryokuma no Machi
- Kokoro Connect (2010-2013)
- Akaoni wa Mō Nakanai
- Buta wa Tondemo Tada no Buta?
- Tamako Market
- Aoi Haruno Subete (2014)
- Demons' Crest (2022)

=== Others ===
- 22/7 (character design, original character designer for Miu Takigawa)
- Vocaloid 4 library Tone Rion V4 & Yumemi Nemu (character design)
- Sakura Wars (2019) (guest character design)
