= Wish Upon the Pleiades =

Japanese anime television series

- The cast of Wish Upon the Pleiades.

放課後のプレアデス (Hōkago no Pureadesu)
- Genre: Magical girl
- Created by: Gainax; Subaru
- Original net animation
- Directed by: Shouji Saeki
- Written by: Shouji Saeki; Daisuke Kikuchi
- Music by: Nobuhito Tanahashi
- Studio: Gainax
- Released: February 1, 2011
- Runtime: 5–7 minutes
- Episodes: 4
- Anime television series
- Directed by: Shōji Saeki
- Produced by: Yukihiro Itō; Jun Fukuda; Fuminori Yamazaki; Hirokazu Hara; Naoya Moriya; Akihiko Okada
- Written by: Shōji Saeki (#1–4, 6, 11–12); Tatsuhiko Urahata (#4–6, 8, 11–12); Haruka Kimura (#4, 7, 9–12) (Note: Credited under the pseudonym Yū Mori (森悠, Mori Yū).)
- Music by: Shirō Hamaguchi
- Studio: Gainax
- Licensed by: AUS: Madman Entertainment; NA: Sentai Filmworks; UK: Animatsu Entertainment
- Original network: ABC, Tokyo MX, GTV, GYT, BS Fuji, AT-X
- English network: SEA: ANIPLUS HD Animax Asia
- Original run: April 9, 2015 – June 24, 2015
- Episodes: 12

Wish Upon the Pleiades (Japanese: 放課後のプレアデス, Hepburn: Hōkago no Pureadesu; lit. "After-School Pleiades") is an original net animation series produced by Gainax in collaboration with Japanese automaker Subaru. The series was released on YouTube in four parts on February 1, 2011, with the English-subtitled version appearing six days later. An anime television series aired in Japan between April and June 2015. It was the final anime series to be produced by Gainax before their closure on June 7, 2024.

== Story ==
One day, a girl named Subaru comes across a group of magical girls, among which is her childhood friend Aoi, and becomes one herself. Their duty is to search for fragments of a spaceship belonging to an alien known as a Pleiadian. However, a mysterious boy is seeking the fragments for his own use.

== Characters ==
Subaru (すばる)
Voiced by: Natsumi Takamori
Subaru is the clumsy main protagonist.
Aoi (あおい)
Voiced by: Ayuru Ōhashi
Subaru's friend, who is often worried about her attitude.
Itsuki (いつき)
Voiced by: Kanako Tateno
A kind girl.
Hikaru (ひかる)
Voiced by: Yui Makino
A frank girl whose father is a pianist.
Nanako (ななこ)
Voiced by: Saki Fujita
A girl who is often seen wearing a black witch's outfit even outside of magical form. She has a generally monotone personality which changes when translating for the Pleiadian.
The Pleiadian (プレアデス星人, Pureadesuseijin)
Voiced by: Saki Fujita
A small green alien who is searching for the scattered fragment of his spaceship engine.
Minato (みなと)
Voiced by: Houko Kuwashima
A boy who resides in a mysterious greenhouse, who is also stealing the fragments of the star.

== Media ==
=== Original net animation ===
The four-part original net animation series was created by Gainax in collaboration with car manufacturer Subaru. The series was released on YouTube on February 1, 2011, with an English subtitled version released on February 7, 2011.

==== Episode list ====
No.	Title	Original release date
1	"1st Night" "Dai 1 Yoru" (第1夜)	February 1, 2011
A girl named Subaru witnesses a star shower the night before. The next day at school, she enters the viewing room to find a strange magical garden and a boy named Minato. Later on, when her compass is stolen by a strange green blob, Subaru comes across another room filled with oddly dressed girls, one of which is her friend, Aoi.
2	"2nd Night" "Dai 2 Yoru" (第2夜)	February 1, 2011
As the other girls in this strange club wonder how Subaru came across this room, since it was allegedly sealed by magic, Subaru hears a strange noise, which alerts them to a star shower. Subaru is transformed into a magical girl and joins the others on a magic broom ride to chase after a large star known as an Engine Fragment, which they are collecting to send the club president, the green blob, back to his home planet. As they catch the fragment and shrink it down to size, they are confronted by Minato, who is revealed to be their enemy.
3	"3rd Night" "Dai 3 Yoru" (第3夜)	February 1, 2011
The girls try to fight Minato off, but Subaru loses concentration when she recognises Minato, who escapes with the fragment and announces he will come for the others in three days. Subaru wishes to continue to help the girls, but Aoi objects. The next day, Subaru returns to the viewing room, only to find it empty and she cries. Subaru runs into Aoi at a bus shelter, where they make up with each other.
4	"4th Night" "Dai 4 Yoru" (第4夜)	February 1, 2011
The girls confront Minato as he attacks the school looking for the other fragments. As Minato prepares to attack Aoi as she protects the fragments, Subaru stands to protect her where her true powers start to appear. Subaru embraces Minato in the hopes of freeing him, but the evil behind him keeps a hold of him. Minato leaves his jacket to Subaru, who promises to find him some day. Subaru returns to the viewing room, where she finds some beautiful flowers starting to bloom.

=== Television series ===
An anime television adaptation, also by Gainax, aired in Japan between April 9, 2015, and June 24, 2015, and was simulcast by Crunchyroll. The opening theme is "Stella-rium" by Kano while the ending theme is "Koko kara, Kanata kara" (ここから、かなたから, From Here, From Far Away) by fragments (Natsumi Takamori, Ayuru Ōhashi, Kanako Tateno, Yui Makino, and Saki Fujita).

==== Episode list ====
No.	Title	Original release date
1	"Meteor Shower Forecast: Rain with Occasional Shooting Stars" "Ryūsei Yohō: Ame Tokidoki Nagareboshi" (流星予報:雨時々流れ星)	April 9, 2015
One day, while visiting her school's observatory in preparation for a meteor shower, a girl named Subaru comes across a mysterious greenhouse where she meets a frail boy. After leaving the room, finding it revert to the observatory before her eyes, Subaru encounters a small alien-like creature and follows it to a magically sealed classroom, where she comes across a group of girls in witch outfits, including her childhood friend Aoi. The girls and the creature, revealed to be a Pleiadian and the girls' president, notice potential in Subaru and give her a special broom, which brings her up through the clouds to a star-shaped gem that transforms her into a witch herself. The girls soon come under attack by a fragment of the Pleiadian's spaceship engine, which they attempt to capture but are suddenly thrown off when Subaru and Aoi argue with each other over their pasts. Encouraged by Subaru's positive attitude, the girls make a second attempt to capture the fragment, managing to shrink it down to size, but suddenly come under attack by a mysterious cloaked figure, who steals the fragment for himself. Luckily, Subaru manages to hide the real fragment under her hat and gets to see a meteor shower up close.
2	"The Star Travel Song" "Hoshi Meguri no Uta" (星めぐりの歌)	April 16, 2015
The next day, Subaru is surprised to find Aoi and the rest of the girls are all a part of her class, with her classmates seemingly having their memories rewritten. The Pleiadian believes this to be because of everyone's fates converging caused by his spaceship, which also seems to be related to Subaru and Aoi's contradictory pasts. With the story behind it put on hold, the girls teach Subaru how to ride her drive shaft, after which Subaru appears to be conflicted over her relationship with Aoi. She once again arrives at the mysterious greenhouse where the boy, Minato, assures her that Aoi is probably having the same worries as her. Taking his advice, Subaru and Aoi take to the skies to talk things over and become friends again. A week later, as Subaru becomes better at flying, the group come across a pair of fragments that need to be stopped at the same time. Subaru and Aoi use a song they know from their past to catch the fragments and stop them just in time, but the cloaked figure appears once again and steals one of the fragments for himself. After briefly lamenting their frustration, the girls manage to get a place to assemble in the form of a "Cosplay Research Club".
3	"Five Cinderellas" "Gonin no Shinderera" (5人のシンデレラ)	April 22, 2015
As the girls feel downhearted over another loss against the cloaked stranger, not helped by the Pleiadian's harsh words, Subaru once again receives encouragement from Minato. Later, the cloaked figure attempts to steal another fragment from the girls, but a counterattack causes the fragment to wind up in the ocean, prompting the girls to dive in after it. However, some interference by the cloaked boy causes the fragment to launch up into the stratosphere. Managing to utilise Subaru's power, fellow member Itsuki helps bring everyone up to the stratosphere to obtain the fragment before the boy can.
4	"Dream of Sol" "So no Yume" (ソの夢)	April 29, 2015
The girls, learning that the next fragment is located in the Moon's orbit, are trained rigorously to prepare themselves to leave Earth. They also hear about a piano concert held by Hikaru's parents, who are trying to send piano music into space, much to the dismay of Hikaru herself, who barely gets to see them. Later, as the girls head for the Moon, they are once again interrupted by the cloaked boy, who ends up causing a blast. After having a dream, in which she laments to Subaru about not being able to listen to her father's song that she altered by herself, Hikaru awakes to hear the song being sent from Earth by her father, who believed a note she left that said she would be on the moon. After using the cloaked boy in order to catch the fragment, Hikaru manages to hear that her father kept the note she added to the song.
5	"A Hat, Ice, and a Princess" "Bōshi to Kōri to Ohime-sama" (帽子と氷とお姫様)	May 6, 2015
Aoi and Itsuki are chosen to play the prince and princess in a class play for the upcoming cultural festival. After encountering Minato again, Subaru hears from Itsuki about how, when she was younger, she got herself in an accident for which her brother got blamed, which led her to be conscious about causing people trouble with her own desires. Just then, as another fragment appears, the girls wind up on Saturn's rings, where they are once again confronted by the cloaked boy. Deciding to take a risk once again, Itsuki and the others repeatedly dive through the rings in order to locate the fragment and capture it. Learning that she is allowed to be selfish sometimes, Itsuki switches roles with Aoi and plays as the prince in the play.
6	"Flower of Awakening" "Mezame no Hana" (目覚めの花)	May 13, 2015
A mysterious band of light appears in the sky, which is revealed to be a faint remnant of the Pleiadian's spaceship that is slowly materialising. After recovering a fragment and returning it to the clubroom, Subaru discovers it to be a fragment that the cloaked boy had captured, using it to track the girls towards their base. Trapped inside the school by the boy's magic, which locks the others out, Subaru flees from the cloaked boy and comes across the greenhouse, where Minato reacts strangely to the earring that emerged from the fragment. Minato sends Subaru further into the garden to a door, which opens up the observatory doors, allowing the other girls to enter the school and pursue the caped boy, who brings the school into space in order to fight against them. Just as the boy uses his own fragments to capture the others, the spaceship materializes and starts crashing towards Earth. As Subaru becomes determined to protect everyone, the shafts change forms, granting enough power to start up the engine, causing the spaceship to disappear again. When Subaru returns to the greenhouse, she finds it has completed wilted, save for a few bright flowers.
7	"Two Treasures or The Smell of Strawberries" "Takaramono Futatsu, Arui wa, Ichigo no Kaori" (タカラモノフタツ 或いは イチゴノカオリ)	May 20, 2015
After Subaru plants the flowers that were left behind, she tells Aoi about Minato and the mysterious greenhouse, but she only becomes annoyed that she didn't tell her earlier. Later that day, Subaru seems to find Minato tending the garden, but he denies any existence of a greenhouse. Afterwards, the girls go to capture a fragment that has merged with a comet that is heading towards the Sun. While the others hold off the cloaked boy, Subaru and Aoi, realising they both share the feeling of being left behind, make up with each other and manage to capture the fragment. Afterwards, Subaru and Aoi are surprised to find they both possess a necklace Aoi helped Subaru find during their childhood, realising that neither left the other behind. This gives Subaru the courage to talk to Minato, who recognizes her after all.
8	"Nanako 13" "Nanako Sātīn" (ななこ13)	May 27, 2015
With the next fragment lying on the outer edge of the Solar System, Nanako, the Pleiadian's translator, volunteers to travel alone to its destination so the others can instantly warp there, having the Pleiadian act as her stand-in during her three month journey. As the months pass, Nanako laments her loneliness, having been separated from her little brother after he left with her mother to travel around the world. Arriving at the edge of the Solar System, Nanako comes across a lone planet, which she named Apate, and manages to call out to Subaru and the others, who join her in capturing the fragment, which causes Apate to gradually transform into a star. The girls soon arrive back to shortly after Nanako left, allowing her to celebrate her birthday and look forward to the events she would have otherwise missed.
9	"Planetarium Rendezvous" "Puranetariumu Randebū" (プラネタリウムランデブー)	June 3, 2015
With the school's cultural festival approaching, Subaru, who is making a planetarium with Minato for the astronomy club, offers to look after the fragments while the cosplay club hold their activities. While testing out the planetarium, Minato brings Subaru into outer space, taking her on a tour of the universe. During the trip, Subaru recalls how she once experienced something similar when she met a boy in hospital, which is revealed to be Minato. After the two return home, leaving the memories of the tour behind, Minato discovers the fragments Subaru had hidden in the observatory.
10	"Shining Night" "Kirakira no Yoru" (キラキラの夜)	June 10, 2015
Alerted to the fragments being stolen, Subaru discovers Minato is the caped boy as he uses the stolen fragments to draw the others towards him. While waiting in space, Minato thinks back to his childhood, where he met another mysterious boy named Elnath, helping him to search for crystals to repair his broken spaceship. Later, after Minato's first meeting with Subaru, Minato attempted to capture an engine fragment to grant Subaru's wish, only for Elnath's power to run out, revealing Minato had actually been in a coma the entire time. Refusing to accept this fate, Minato chose to pursue the fragments in order to change his destiny, casting Elnath aside and becoming consumed by darkness, while his other self slept until being found by Subaru in the magical greenhouse. Back in the present, as Minato resolves to use the fragments to disappear from his world, Subaru reveals her identity to him in order show that someone still cares for him. However, Minato gets stabbed by the remaining fragment and disappears, using the last of his strength to return Subaru and the fragments safely to Earth.
11	"The Final Light and His Name" "Saigo no Hikari to Kare no Namae" (最後の光と彼の名前)	June 17, 2015
Upon waking up from her experience, Subaru finds she has lost her transformation powers and is no longer able to see the Pleiadian. Not wanting to remain depressed, the girls decide to turn their focuses to enjoying the cultural festival. After the festival, Aoi gives Subaru some encouragement before she and the others set off in search of the final fragment. Despite moving faster than the speed of light, the girls struggle to catch up to the fragment, but their determination to see things through points them towards their destination. Meanwhile, Subaru, recalling how she and Minato once exchanged stars with each other, manages to go through a magic door, where she finds the real Minato in his comatose state. Just then, their two stars combine, Subaru gains new magic powers and awakens the true Minato before reuniting with the others.
12	"At the Water's Edge" "Nagisa ni te" (渚にて)	June 24, 2015
The girls discover the last fragment to be located within a black hole. With everyone needing to combine the fragments in order to drag the last one towards them, Subaru stops Minato from going into the black hole after it, assuring him that she'll be by his side and kissing him. With the spaceship appearing near them, Minato makes up with the Pleiadian, who is revealed to be Elnath, before helping the girls form six new black holes to draw out the remaining fragment. With his spaceship finally completed, Elnath travels to a new universe to carry on Minato's mission to save potential lives. Meanwhile, Minato takes the girls to the beginning of time, offering them the chance to live out different potentials, but they decide to be themselves. As the girls part ways with each other, Subaru decides to stay with Minato. Returning to the start of middle school, Subaru manages to reform her friendship with Aoi, as well as make friends with the other girls.
