= Kokoro Connect =

Japanese light novel series by Sadanatsu Anda

- Cover of Kokoro Connect volume 1, Hito Random

ココロコネクト (Kokoro Konekuto)
- Genre: Romantic comedy, supernatural
- Light novel
- Written by: Sadanatsu Anda
- Illustrated by: Shiromizakana
- Published by: Enterbrain
- English publisher: NA: J-Novel Club
- Imprint: Famitsu Bunko
- Original run: January 30, 2010 – September 30, 2013
- Volumes: 11
- Manga
- Written by: Sadanatsu Anda
- Illustrated by: Cuteg
- Published by: Enterbrain
- English publisher: NA: Seven Seas Entertainment
- Magazine: Famitsu Comic Clear
- Original run: October 22, 2010 – August 23, 2013
- Volumes: 5
- Anime television series
- Directed by: Shin Oonuma (Note: Credited as Chief Director (総監督, Sō Kantoku).); Shinya Kawatsura
- Produced by: Masako Takayama; Takahiro Yamanaka
- Written by: Fumihiko Shimo
- Music by: Yasuhiro Misawa
- Studio: Silver Link
- Licensed by: AUS: Hanabee; NA: Sentai Filmworks; UK: MVM Films
- Original network: Tokyo MX, Tvk, Chiba TV, TV Saitama, MBS, AT-X, BS11
- Original run: July 8, 2012 – December 30, 2012
- Episodes: 17
- Manga

Kokoro Connect On Air
- Written by: Sadanatsu Anda
- Illustrated by: Na!
- Published by: Kadokawa Shoten
- Magazine: Nyantype
- Original run: June 30, 2012 – December 27, 2012
- Volumes: 1
- Video game

Kokoro Connect Yochi Random
- Developer: Banpresto
- Publisher: Namco Bandai Games
- Genre: Visual novel
- Platform: PlayStation Portable
- Released: November 22, 2012

Kokoro Connect (Japanese: ココロコネクト, Hepburn: Kokoro Konekuto; lit. "Hearts Connect" or "Souls Connect") is a Japanese light novel series written by Sadanatsu Anda, with illustrations by Shiromizakana. It centers around five high school students facing supernatural phenomena that test their bonds by forcing them to reveal their secrets. The series includes 11 volumes published by Enterbrain between January 2010 and September 2013. Two manga adaptations have been published by Enterbrain and Kadokawa Shoten. A 13-episode anime adaptation directed by Shinya Kawatsura, written by Fumihiko Shimo, and produced by Silver Link aired in Japan between July and September 2012. Four additional episodes aired on December 30, 2012. The Kokoro Connect franchise was localized in North America by several companies: Seven Seas Entertainment licensed the manga, Sentai Filmworks the anime, and J-Novel Club the light novel series.

== Plot ==
The story primarily involves five high school students – Taichi, Iori, Himeko, Yoshifumi, and Yui – who are all the only members of the Student Cultural Research Club at the high school they attend. They all face various supernatural, sense-altering phenomena in their daily lives, all seemingly caused by a cryptic entity which refers to itself as 'Heartseed', who is intent on using the phenomena to test the characters for an unknown goal. As the five undergo these phenomena, the strength of their bonds will be tested.

== Characters ==
=== Main characters ===
Taichi Yaegashi (八重樫 太一, Yaegashi Taichi)
Voiced by: Takahiro Mizushima (Japanese); Greg Ayres (English)
Taichi is the main protagonist and a big professional wrestling fan. He and four others formed the cultural club because their school did not have the club they wanted to join. He is generally selfless and will usually try to help others in need. He confesses his love to Iori in the Hito Random arc, however he gets rejected since it was believed she was going to "die." They do start a relationship but break up very shortly after because Iori believed Taichi did not know the real "her". During the events of Michi Random, his feelings began to change and he confesses to Himeko by the end of the series.
Iori Nagase (永瀬 伊織, Nagase Iori)
Voiced by: Aki Toyosaki (Japanese); Monica Rial (English)
Iori is the easy going president of the cultural club. She lives alone with her mother who is seldom at home. Having previously had a violent stepfather, she had learned to alter her personality to fit the expectations of others to the point where she is unsure who she was originally supposed to be. She is in love with Taichi, but decides to postpone their relationship until the phenomena was over. In Kizu Random, she finds out that Himeko has feelings for Taichi, too; Iori confronts her and later encourages her to confess to him. By the end of the Kako Random arc, she starts to question whether or not she has feelings for Taichi and if people really know the real her; throughout the course of the series, their feelings toward each other change back into friendship and they do not date again, though they remain happy that they fell in love with each other. She is controlled several times by Heartseed when a phenomenon is about to end.
Himeko Inaba (稲葉 姫子, Inaba Himeko)
Voiced by: Miyuki Sawashiro (Japanese); Luci Christian (English)
Himeko is the vice president of the cultural club, who has a contrasting personality with Iori. She often reacts violently to Taichi or Yoshifumi's jokes, and is nicknamed "Inaban" by Iori. She was a computer club member but quit after having an argument with the president of that club, and then joined the cultural club. She is generally distrustful of others and worries a lot, even more so when they begin swapping bodies. Between them, she is the most calm and rational when dealing with unexpected situations. During Kizu Random, Heartseed confronts her in coming to the realization that she has feelings for Taichi when she was pretending she did not know. She confesses to him after the class trip by the encouragement of Iori, declaring that she would make him fall for her even if he was in love with Iori. Over the course of the series, she gets more and more attached to the group, especially Taichi, and softens her sharp and rational personality. In the end of the Michi Random arc, she starts dating Taichi and at the end of the light novels, they are still a couple.
Yui Kiriyama (桐山 唯, Kiriyama Yui)
Voiced by: Hisako Kanemoto (Japanese); Emily Neves (English)
Yui is a close friend of Himeko, who initially applied to be a member of the Fancy Club before finding out that it was defunct, joining the cultural club as a last resort. She is skilled in karate but developed an extreme androphobia after she was almost raped in junior high school. She starts having a different opinion of boys after Taichi helps her, and as the series progresses, she grows to trust him and Yoshifumi as they help her combat her greatest fears. She has rejected Yoshifumi numerous times, but she later admits that she is just not yet ready to have a relationship. She overcomes her androphobia after Yoshifumi reaffirms his love for her, and the two start dating near the end of the series.
Yoshifumi Aoki (青木 義文, Aoki Yoshifumi)
Voiced by: Takuma Terashima (Japanese); Clint Bickham (English)
Yoshifumi is Taichi's best friend with whom he often shares adult videos. His perverted attitude led him to believe that there was a real "Player's Club" at the school, dedicated to taking lewd photos of the school's female population. While having a non-serious attitude, he loves Yui and does not hesitate to show it seriously. As a kid, he vowed to live life to the fullest after a student he knew died; however, this also leads to difficulties in communicating with others as he isolated himself for a long time after. Throughout the series, his communication improves as he opens up more and more to Yui. He is considered as the weakest of the five by Heartseed, but generally has the clearest head on his shoulders of any member of the group; this, however, also causes him to overreact and make foolish mistakes while trying too hard to help people.
Chihiro Uwa (宇和 千尋, Uwa Chihiro)
Voiced by: Toshiyuki Toyonaga
Chihiro is one of two freshmen who joined the cultural club. He was given a power by Heartseed called Illusory Projection, which allows him to transform into anyone by having the same physical traits of the person including their scent and voice.
Shino Enjōji (円城寺 紫乃, Enjōji Shino)
Voiced by: Nao Tōyama
Shino is one of two freshmen that joins the cultural club. She is in love with Chihiro.
Heartseed (ふうせんかずら, Fūsen Kazura)
A supernatural being who is the cause of the phenomena surrounding the cultural club. It communicates with the group by possessing other humans, most often Mr. Gotō, and often speaks in a tired monotone voice. Its name comes from the balloon plant, whose seeds have heart-shaped patterns. There are actually two Heartseeds, the first who refers to itself with "boku" while another who uses "watashi", which possibly means that the first is a male and second is a female.

=== Yamaboshi High School ===
Maiko Fujishima (藤島 麻衣子, Fujishima Maiko)
Voiced by: Shizuka Itō (Japanese); Carli Mosier (English)
Class 1-3's representative and is quite perverted in nature.
Ryūzen Gotō (後藤 龍善, Gotō Ryūzen)
Voiced by: Keiji Fujiwara (Japanese); David Matranga (English)
Class 1-3's homeroom teacher and cultural club advisor, who is often possessed by Heartseed. He also moderates the jazz club. He occasionally gives advice to the club in the form of moral teaching.
Shingo Watase (渡瀬 伸吾, Watase Shingo)
Voiced by: Yūki Ono (Japanese); Connor Leach (English)
Taichi, Iori, and Himeko's classmate. He has a crush on Maiko.
Shōto Shiroyama (城山 翔斗, Shiroyama Shōto)
Voiced by: Mitsuhiro Ichiki (Japanese); Johnny De La Cerda (English)
Taichi, Iori, and Himeko's classmate who is nicknamed "Prince" in his class and his jazz club. He had a crush on Iori, but was quickly declined, mostly due to him asking during the period when Iori was isolated from the class.
Kaoru Setouchi (瀬戸内 薫, Setouchi Kaoru)
Voiced by: Sumire Uesaka (Japanese); Shannon Emerick (English)
Class 2-2's representative in the second year of the story. In Michi Random, she has a crush on Shōto. When Iori rejected Shōto, she got angry and made several rumors about Iori, and hired some miscreants from other schools to ruin the cultural club's presentation. Ironically, while being blamed by the miscreants for the kidnapping of Inaban, she ends up becoming friends with Iori, changing her appearance, physical and mental, to be more tame and nice.
Mihara (三原) and Mikitani (三木谷)
Voiced by: Yukiyo Fujii (Mihara) and Kanako Nomura (Mikitani)
Two friends of Kaoru. They egg her on to tear up and ruin the cultural club's presentation, and are responsible for misguiding the thoughts of Kaoru but are not seen after Michi Random.
Mariko Nakayama (中山 真理子, Nakayama Mariko)
Voiced by: Chinatsu Akasaki (Japanese); Juliet Simmons (English)
Iori's best friend who is a calligraphy club member.
Yukina Kurihara (栗原 雪菜, Kurihara Yukina)
Voiced by: Kaori Ishihara (Japanese); Hayley Adams (English)
Yui's friend.
Misaki Ōsawa (大沢 美咲, Ōsawa Misaki)
Voiced by: Yuka Iguchi

=== Others ===
Chinatsu Mihashi (三橋 千夏, Mihashi Chinatsu)
Voiced by: Maaya Uchida (Japanese); Shannon Emerick (English)
An old karate rival of Yui's who appears to be hung up over a certain promise Yui apparently made.
Nana Nishino (西野 菜々, Nishino Nana)
Voiced by: Haruka Tomatsu (Japanese); Hayley Adams (English)
Yoshifumi's old girlfriend whom he dated in middle school before she moved to Sendai. Her appearance is similar to that of Yui's when Yoshifumi was in middle school, but she cut her hair after moving away.
Anzu Kiriyama (桐山 杏, Kiriyama Anzu)
Voiced by: Ayane Sakura (Japanese); Tiffany Terrell (English)
Yui's younger sister.
Rina Yaegashi (八重樫 莉奈, Yaegashi Rina)
Voiced by: Asuka Ōgame (Japanese); Brittney Karbowski (English)
Taichi's elementary school age younger sister. She often gives advice to her brother about love. Like Ryūzen and Iori, she is sometimes controlled by Heartseed, but a different one from the Heartseed the cultural club members know of.
Reika Nagase (永瀬 玲佳, Nagase Reika)
Voiced by: Atsuko Tanaka (Japanese); Molly Searcy (English)
Iori's single parent. She has dated five different men, but has only been married to three out of the five.

== Media ==
=== Light novel ===
Kokoro Connect began as a light novel series written by Sadanatsu Anda, with illustrations by Yukiko Horiguchi under the pen name Shiromizakana. Anda entered the first novel in the series, originally titled Hito Tsunagari Te, Doko e Yuku (ヒトツナガリテ、ドコへユク), into Enterbrain's 11th Entertainment Awards in 2009 and the novel won the Special Prize. The first volume, renamed Kokoro Connect Hito Random, was published on January 30, 2010, under Enterbrain's Famitsu Bunko imprint. The main series ended with the tenth release of the novels on March 30, 2013, and a side-story collection was released on September 30, 2013. During their panel at Anime Expo 2018, J-Novel Club announced that they have licensed the light novel.

No.	Title	Original release date	English release date
1	Kokoro Connect Hito Random; Heart Connect Random People (ココロコネクト ヒトランダム)	January 30, 2010; 978-4-04-726290-4	August 22, 2018; 978-1-718-32600-2
Chapter 1: By The Time We Realized, It Had Already Begun; Chapter 2: B___; Chapter 3: Definition of "Fascinating"; Chapter 4: Bonds and Bombshells (One Week Later); Chapter 5: Soliloquy of a Jobber; Chapter 6: Low Blow; Chapter 7: Conclude and Begin Anew; Chapter 8: Born That Way; Chapter 9: In Love and Death; Epilogue
The life of Yamaboshi High Cultural Club's members: Taichi Yaegashi, Iori Nagase, Himeko Inaba, Yoshifumi Aoki, and Yui Kiriyama starts to change when all of a sudden, their bodies began to swap. A being known as "Heartseed" possess their teacher Ryuuzen Gotō and states that he is responsible for this phenomenon where their bodies swap randomly. The phenomenon name is "changing personalities" (人格入れ替わり).
2	Kokoro Connect Kizu Random; Heart Connect Random Wound (ココロコネクト キズランダム)	May 29, 2010; 978-4-04-726537-0	October 24, 2018; 978-1-718-32602-6
Prologue: It Struck Without Warning; Chapter 1: C Can't Stop Can't Stop Can't Stop; Chapter 2: By The Time We Realized, It Had Already Begun... Again; Chapter 3: Our New Normal; Chapter 4: Falling Apart; Chapter 5: Stronger Together; Chapter 6: Can't Unsee It; Chapter 7: Showdown; Chapter 8: Using Her Words; Epilogue: Inaba Himeko Strikes Back
Three weeks after the first phenomenon ended, "Heartseed" returns and gives the Cultural Club's members another phenomenon that makes their desires unleashed. As the phenomenon begins, it starts to cause cracks in the relationship between the club members. The phenomenon name is "liberation of desire" (欲望解放).
3	Kokoro Connect Kako Random; Heart Connect Random Past (ココロコネクト カコランダム)	September 30, 2010; 978-4-04-726775-6	December 26, 2018; 978-1-718-32604-0
Prologue: New Year's Day; Chapter 1: It Began With A Warning; Chapter 2: Once Upon A Time; Chapter 3: Old Self, New Self; Chapter 4: No Choice; Chapter 5: New Year's Eve; Chapter 6: Goodbye; Chapter 7: I Am My Own Lord; Chapter 8: Second Chances; Epilogue: All It Takes
As winter vacation rolls in, a different Heartseed than before instigates a new phenomenon in which, during certain times of the day, members besides Taichi will randomly revert to a younger age, regaining some of their childhood memories upon returning. The phenomenon name is "time to retrograde" (時間退行).
4	Kokoro Connect Michi Random; Heart Connect Random Track (ココロコネクト ミチランダム)	January 29, 2011; 978-4-04-727030-5	March 1, 2019; 978-1-718-32606-4
Prologue: I Just Can't; Chapter 1: Yaegashi Taichi's Confession; Chapter 2: Valentine's Day With Inaba Himeko; Chapter 3: Aoki Yoshifumi's Preferred Battle Tactic; Chapter 4: Yaegashi Taichi's Tangled Love Life; Chapter 5: Kiriyama Yui's Dramatic Struggle; Chapter 6: Inaba Himeko's Commitment; Chapter 7: Yaegashi Taichi's Epiphany; Chapter 8: Nagase Iori Settles the Score; Epilogue: Nagase Iori's Final Chapter
As Iori begins to question if Taichi really understands the real her and if she's really in love with Taichi, each of the members' conscience can be heard by one or more other members. The phenomenon name is "sentiments to transmit" (感情伝導).
5	Kokoro Connect Clip Time; Heart Connect Clip Time (ココロコネクト クリップタイム)	May 30, 2011; 978-4-04-727280-4	May 7, 2019; 978-1-718-32608-8
How to Get Mileage Out of a Paparazzi Photo; Kiriyama Yui's First Date; Inaba Himeko's Solitary Struggle; Pentagon++
6	Kokoro Connect Nise Random; Heart Connect Random Fake (ココロコネクト ニセランダム)	October 29, 2011; 978-4-04-727585-0	July 5, 2019; 978-1-718-32610-1
Chapter 1: The Sports Festival; Chapter 2: Temptation; Chapter 3: The Ultimate Game; Chapter 4: No Going Back; Chapter 5: Five Minus Two; Chapter 6: The Starring Role; Chapter 7: At Any Given Moment; Chapter 8: The Day of the Festival; Epilogue: Rock Their World
The phenomenon name is "fantasy projection" (幻想投影).
7	Kokoro Connect Yume Random; Heart Connect Random Dream (ココロコネクト ユメランダム)	February 29, 2012; 978-4-04-727839-4	October 14, 2019; 978-1-718-32612-5
Chapter 1: The Dreaded Career Planning Surveys; Chapter 2: It Began, Prefaced as "The End"; Chapter 3: Playing Cupid; Chapter 4: A Fork in the Road; Chapter 5: World's Greatest Detective; Chapter 6: Ensnared; Chapter 7: Under the Sea of Stars; Chapter 8: A Resolution for All; Epilogue: Going Toward
The phenomenon name is "perspective dreamland" (夢中透視).
8	Kokoro Connect Step Time; Heart Connect Step Time (ココロコネクト ステップタイム)	June 30, 2012; 978-4-04-728122-6	January 28, 2020; 978-1-718-32614-9
First Encounter; A Tale of Two Loners; DATE x DATE x DATE; A Mad Dash Down My Destined Path
9	Kokoro Connect Asu Random Part 1 Heart Connect Random Tomorrow Part 1 (ココロコネクト アスランダム 上)	September 29, 2012; 978-4-04-728350-3	June 2, 2020; 978-1-718-32616-3
Chapter 1: Just Another Day; Chapter 2: By the Time They Realized, It Had Already Begun; Chapter 3: Not Quite Right; Chapter 4: Someone Else's Story; Chapter 5: Finally, It Begins; Chapter 6: Sheep and the Shepherd; Chapter 7: Left Behind; Chapter 8: Seeds Sown in Secret; Chapter 9: Parting Words; Chapter 10: Departure
10	Kokoro Connect Asu Random Part 2 Heart Connect Random Tomorrow Part 2 (ココロコネクト アスランダム 下)	March 30, 2013; 978-4-04-728736-5	September 2, 2020; 978-1-718-32618-7
Chapter 1: The Other Side; Chapter 2: The Battle Is Joined; Chapter 3: Opposition; Chapter 4: Sabotage; Chapter 5: The Catalyst; Chapter 6: Showdown; Chapter 7: Heartseed; Epilogue: Where Our Bonds Take Us
11	Kokoro Connect Precious Time; Heart Connect Precious Time (ココロコネクト プレシャスタイム)	September 30, 2013; 978-4-04-729150-8	November 24, 2020; 978-1-718-32620-0
The Rina Report; Couples' Battle Royale; Fly High, New Kid!; The Rest of Our Lives

=== Manga ===
A manga adaptation illustrated by Cuteg was serialized in Enterbrain's Famitsu Comic Clear online manga magazine between October 22, 2010, and August 23, 2013. Enterbrain published five tankōbon volumes between May 14, 2011, and September 14, 2013. Seven Seas Entertainment began releasing the series in North America in August 2014. A second manga based on the anime adaptation, illustrated by Na! and titled Kokoro Connect On Air, was serialized between the August 2012 and April 2013 issues of Kadokawa Shoten's Nyantype magazine. A single volume was released on March 30, 2013. Enterbrain published two volumes of an anthology titled Magi-Cu 4-koma Kokoro Connect on July 25 and September 25, 2012.

=== Drama CDs ===
Enterbrain released a drama CD titled Kokoro Connect Natsu to Mizugi to Bōfūu (ココロコネクト 夏と水着と暴風雨, Heart Connect Summer, Swimsuits, and a Storm) on February 16, 2011. A second drama CD titled Kokoro Connect Haru to Date to Imōto Gokko (ココロコネクト 春とデートと妹ごっこ, Heart Connect Spring, a Date, and Playing a Little Sister) was released on January 6, 2012.

=== Anime ===
An anime adaptation was directed by Shinya Kawatsura and produced by Silver Link. The anime's screenplay is written by Fumihiko Shimo, the character designs are by Toshifumi Akai, and the sound director is Toshiki Kameyama. The cast is the same with the drama CD cast. Of the 17 episodes, the first 13 were aired in Japan between July 8 and September 30, 2012. The four remaining episodes aired on AT-X on December 30, 2012. The anime was released on seven Blu-ray Disc (BD)/DVD compilation volumes between October 24, 2012, and April 24, 2013.

The anime has seven pieces of theme music: three opening themes and four ending themes. The first opening theme is "Paradigm" (パラダイム, Paradaimu) by Eufonius and is used for the first ten episodes. The episodes released on BD and DVD, as well as the AT-X broadcast, replace "Paradigm" with "Kimochi Signal" (キモチシグナル, Kimochi Shigunaru) by Sayuri Horishita. Beginning with episode 12, the opening theme is "Kimi Rhythm" (キミリズム, Kimi Rizumu) by Masaki Imai. The first ending theme is "Kokoro no Kara" (ココロノカラ) by Team.Nekokan [Neko] feat. Junca Amaoto for the first five episodes. The second ending theme is "Cry Out" by Team Nekokan feat. Atsuko for episodes six through ten. The third ending theme is "Salvage" by Team.Nekokan [Neko] feat. Rekka Katakiri for episodes 11 through 13. The fourth ending theme is "I scream Chocolatl" by Team.Nekokan [Neko] feat. Lia for episodes 14 through 17. An insert song titled "Milkshake" (ミルクセーキ, Miruku Sēki) sung by Sayuri Horishita was used in episode 17.

The series was simulcast on Crunchyroll. Sentai Filmworks licensed the series in North America and released the first 13 episodes on BD/DVD on October 22, 2013, and the remaining four on December 10 of that same year. Hanabee has licensed the series in Australia. After the acquisition of Crunchyroll by Sony Pictures Television, Kokoro Connect, among several Sentai Filmworks titles, was dropped from the Crunchyroll streaming service on March 31, 2022.

==== Allegation of bullying during promotion ====
At an advance screening of the anime series on June 24, 2012, voice actor Mitsuhiro Ichiki had supposedly auditioned for a character role and was invited to the event to allegedly be announced as a surprise cast member. It was then revealed at the event that Ichiki was to in fact be chosen as head of public relations, with his audition revealed to be a candid-camera style fake. While Ichiki accepted the role as head of PR, criticism of the event led to a flow of criticism directed towards the staff and voice actors involved on blog websites and Twitter accounts, as well as people not directly involved. The staff of the show posted an official statement on September 2, 2012, apologizing for "insufficient consideration regarding performers" leading to "widespread discomfort and misunderstanding", promising to seriously reflect on the incident in the future. They had also cancelled the Internet radio program Kokoro Connect Bunken Shinbun as a result. Ichiki also posted a statement the same day, mentioning how he felt no ill will towards the staff as a result of the incident and denies any bullying or harassment taking place.

==== Episodes ====
No.	Title	Original release date
Hito Random
1	"A Story That Had Already Begun Before Anyone Realized It"; Transliteration: "Kizuita Toki ni wa Hajimatteita toiu Hanashi" (Japanese: 気づいた時には始まっていたという話)	July 8, 2012
Taichi Yaegashi, Iori Nagase, Himeko Inaba, Yui Kiriyama, and Yoshifumi Aoki are first-year high school classmates and members of the Student Cultural Society. As Taichi, Iori, and Himeko try to brainstorm about a new topic for a news article, Yoshifumi and Yui later arrive in the clubroom and claim to have temporarily switched bodies the previous night. Taichi, Iori, and Himeko are pretty skeptical of this, but when Iori goes to a classroom to retrieve a notebook, it is soon proven to be real when Taichi suddenly switches bodies with Iori and briefly gets hit on by the class president, Maiko Fujishima. After spending the rest of the afternoon convincing Himeko what had happened is real, Taichi and Iori eventually switch back to their original bodies, before the five of them leave school to return to their homes.
2	"Some Fascinating Humans"; Transliteration: "Nakanaka Omoshiroi Ningen-tachi" (Japanese: なかなか面白い人間達)	July 15, 2012
The next morning, Himeko, Yoshifumi, and Yui all switch bodies together, though soon revert to normal. After the gang are excused from absence in class, Taichi briefly ends up switching places with Yui before getting grilled by Iori over what happened the previous day while he was in her body. Just then, the gang is approached by someone who had swapped bodies with their homeroom teacher Ryūzen Gotō, calling himself Heartseed, who is revealed to be responsible for the body swapping, vaguely explaining the situation before leaving. A week later, the group discuss how best to handle the situation without making anyone else suspicious. As Iori later swaps bodies with Yoshifumi, she talks with Taichi about how the switching may affect their individuality before she switches back. The next day, as Taichi and Himeko switch and end up volunteering for off-campus cleaning duty with Maiko, Himeko decides to get revenge against Taichi and declare to Maiko that Iori is hers while in Taichi's body.
3	"Jobber and Low Blow"; Transliteration: "Jobā to Rōburō" (Japanese: ジョバーとローブロー)	July 22, 2012
As Taichi questions Himeko about what she said in front of Maiko, she implies to Taichi he has feelings for Iori while also worrying about how the body swapping could eventually break them. Later, Taichi and Yoshifumi learn Yui has androphobia, the fear of men. At night, as Taichi switches with Yui, they meet up in a park, where she reveals she gained fear after almost being raped in middle school, believing she could not beat a man in a fight. Wanting to help her get over her fear, Taichi teaches Yui the crotch is the one weakness all men possess. The next day, as Yui becomes a bit more confident and decides to take up martial arts again, Himeko suddenly collapses before Taichi.
4	"Twin Feelings"; Transliteration: "Futatsu no Omoi" (Japanese: 二つの想い)	July 29, 2012
As Taichi and Iori escort Himeko home, Taichi is forced to spill the beans about what happened last night with Yui, leaving Iori a bit shocked as she was unaware of Yui's androphobia. After dropping Himeko off, Iori tells Taichi about the troubles she faced due to her mother Reika Nagase constantly getting remarried, having to keep changing her persona to fit the tastes of others while eventually forgetting who she is, and she feels the body swapping would cause her to just fade away. The next day, Taichi confronts Himeko, who eventually reveals she cannot trust them to use another's body for evil deeds, hating herself for feeling this way. As Taichi tells Himeko she does not need to change who she is to be accepted by others, he tells her a secret about his lustfully thought of her and the other girls in the past. Moved by his confession, Himeko decides to share her issues with the others and finds the others accept her.
5	"A Confession and a Death..."; Transliteration: "Aru Kokuhaku, Soshite Shi wa..." (Japanese: ある告白、そして死は...)	August 5, 2012
Yoshifumi once again confesses to Yui, but she declines since she is not ready to date anyone just yet. Iori pretends to have swapped places with Himeko to find out how Taichi feels about her. After he says he likes their current relationship, Himeko walks in on them, causing Iori to run off in embarrassment. Taichi realizes his folly and chases after her, finding her on a bridge over the river. Taichi expresses his admiration for her and confesses to her, but Heartseed suddenly possesses Iori and forces her to jump off into the river, which results in her being hospitalized for intensive care. Heartseed, who then possesses Gotō, tells the others Iori will soon die, allotting them thirty minutes to decide amongst themselves whose soul will die with her and giving them the ability to switch bodies on verbal request. As Iori swaps with Yoshifumi and learns of the situation, she offers to die with her own body, not willing to sacrifice anyone else. As she spends time talking to everyone individually, she confesses to Taichi and kisses him while in Himeko's body. It turns out Iori managed to survive and the Heartseed planned out this whole ordeal. As Iori recovers from her injuries and returns to school, the gang assume the body swapping has stopped, while Himeko gets revenge on Taichi for stealing her first kiss.
Kizu Random
6	"A Story That Continued Before Anyone Realized It"; Transliteration: "Kizuita Toki ni wa Mata Hajimatteita toiu Hanashi" (Japanese: 気づいた時にはまた始まっていたという話)	August 12, 2012
Three weeks following the body swapping incident, Taichi and Iori have yet to have a chance to talk alone since the club has been busy writing a paper. One day, as Taichi and Himeko are alone in the clubroom, Himeko suddenly starts stripping and making advances on Taichi before they are interrupted by Yui, who suddenly smashes the table without realizing it. Later at night, both Taichi and Iori end up doing things unconsciously, though it does give them a chance to finally talk about the confession. The next day, Taichi, Iori and Himeko learn from Maiko Yui and Yoshifumi had been taken into police custody after Yui had beaten up some guys hitting on some girls, while Yoshifumi was trying to protect her from being taken away. As Taichi, Iori and Himeko discuss the voices they had been hearing in their heads, Heartseed appears again, explaining they are being put through a new phenomenon in which their bodies will impulsively act on their deepest desires. As Taichi, Iori, Himeko and Yoshifumi discuss how they need to be more careful to try and not get innocent people involved, Himeko hides her doubt from the others. Later, Iori calls Taichi to tell him they should put off dating until the phenomenon is over.
7	"Falling Apart"; Transliteration: "Barabara to Kuzureru" (Japanese: バラバラと崩れる)	August 19, 2012
As the others grow concerned about Yui, who has not shown up at school since the incident, Himeko tells Taichi he could be in danger if his desire to help others is unleashed. As the others visit Yui the next day, she reveals her worries she might end up hurting others again. However, Himeko ends up unleashing her desire to scold her, stating her belief they could all be in danger if they do not satisfy Heartseed's desire for entertainment. As Yui doesn't know what to do, Himeko tells her to stop whining, her crying and hiding isn't gonna solve her problems, which causes Yui to have a breakdown. Because of the incident, Himeko tries to keep herself out of the situation, but Taichi's desires cause him to argue with her and lectures her for giving up on her friends and being a coward. She is visibly hurt by this and walks away, with Tachi showing remorse for his words.
8	"And Then There Were None"; Transliteration: "Soshite Dare mo Inakunatta" (Japanese: そして誰もいなくなった)	August 26, 2012
As Himeko distances herself from the others, concerns over Yui cause Taichi and Yoshifumi to argue with each other. When Iori tries to stop them from fighting, Taichi's desires cause him to inadvertently injure her. The next day, as Maiko makes plans with the class for a field trip, Iori becomes worried as both Himeko and Taichi are becoming more distant from her, in which she gets into a fight with Himeko, nearly unleashing her desires in the process. At the moment, Maiko steps in, declaring Himeko and Iori will be a part of her group, much to Himeko's annoyance, as she argues she can't make such decisions. However, Maiko tells her as class representative she can, forcing her to stop protesting as she has no say in the matter. Later, Gotō asks Taichi to help him carry some school equipment. As Tachi doesn't know what to do, Gotō suggests Taichi should turn to his friends for advice, while Maiko later suggests Taichi should consider what is most important to him.
9	"Can't Stop, Can't Stop, Can't Stop"; Transliteration: "Tomaranai Tomaranai Tomaranai" (Japanese: 止まらない止まらない止まらない)	September 2, 2012
Taichi apologizes to Iori and tells her he would rather stay with his friends and risk hurting them than distance himself from them. After making up with Iori, Taichi also manages to make up with Yoshifumi, but Himeko is still avoiding them. Recalling how the body swapping allowed Taichi to help Yui with her androphobia, he and Yoshifumi assure Yui their desires can be controlled with enough will and convince her to attend school again. Meanwhile, Heartseed appears at Himeko's house at night, bringing to light her withheld feelings she fears could tear apart the group if revealed, indirectly revealing her feelings for Tachi. As Heartseed digs deeper, asking who she cares for the most, Himeko snaps and angrily demands he stop talking. Heartseed smiles, stating Himeko is now fully aware of her feelings and with that, his work here is done. Himeko appears weak, trying to reject what has developed, but Heartseed expresses how easy it is to manipulate her and how he looks forward to what's to come. As he exits, Heartseed warns Himeko to stop hiding.
10	"Putting Into Words"; Transliteration: "Sore o Kotoba ni Suru toiu Koto" (Japanese: それを言葉にするということ)	September 9, 2012
As the school goes on the field trip to the mountains, Himeko remains concerned over what Heartseed had told her. Iori takes notice and learns Himeko also has romantic feelings for Taichi. Iori confronts Himeko, who reveals she never acted on her feelings as she did not want the group to fall apart, believing no one would want a weakling such as herself and she didn't want to put herself between Iori and Tachi. Iori tells Himeko to stop putting herself down and reassures her their friendship will always remain despite her flaws and their shared love of Taichi. Just as they make up, Heartseed possesses Iori and tells Himeko Taichi had been in an accident, causing Himeko to panic, believing he had fallen down a cliff. Upon discovering had simply fallen off a tree while rescuing a kitten, remaining relatively unscathed, Himeko breaks down in tears out of relief. With the desire unleashing phenomenon declared over, Himeko decides to confess to Taichi and, despite getting rejected, remains confident in the fact she may one day win against Iori and then gives him a kiss. Laughing gleefully, Himeko looks toward a brighter future where she can be true to her feelings.
Kako Random
11	"A Story That Began As We Realized It"; Transliteration: "Kizuki o Ataerarete Hajimatta toiu Hanashi" (Japanese: 気づきを与えられて始まったという話)	September 16, 2012
On the day before winter break, following a brief period of peace after the desire unleashing incident, a new phenomenon takes place in which Iori and Yui temporarily revert to children from noon to five o'clock in the afternoon. After returning to normal, they lose memory of what happened, but remember things from when they were at the age. Later at night, a second Heartseed appears before Taichi through his younger sister, Rina Yaegashi, tasking him to watch over the others and warning him not to tell the others about his existence. The next day, Taichi stumbles upon Yui, who is argued at by an old karate rival, Chinatsu Mihashi, over breaking a certain promise which she cannot remember. As the gang meets up at an abandoned building, this time Himeko and Yoshifumi shrink, with the now ten-year-old Yoshifumi likening Yui to a girl named Nana Nishino. After reverting to his normal age, Yoshifumi explains Nana was a girl he went out with once before she moved, leading him to be conflicted over how his feelings stand for both her and Yui. The next day, as Taichi and Himeko watch over a fourteen-year-old Iori, Himeko voices her worries.
12	"Into a Snowy City"; Transliteration: "Yuki Furu Machi e" (Japanese: 雪降る街へ)	September 23, 2012
As the gang have to look after Iori who winds up as a baby, Yui is confronted by Chinatsu, who challenges her to a karate match and defeats her. Meanwhile, Yoshifumi ponders if his feelings for Yui are because of her similar appearance to Nana. On the second day of the New Year, Yui reverts to right after she was assaulted and, upon returning to normal, remembers vividly about during age. As Yui refuses to talk things out with Chinatsu and lashes out at Yoshifumi for only liking her because she resembles Nana, he scolds her for refusing to face her problems, she keeps making excuses and giving up and she has no right to criticize him. Both walk away from their outburst, ashamed of their words. Talking with Taichi alone, Yui reveals her promise with Chinatsu was to meet each other at the national karate tournament, which she was unable to keep after contracting her androphobia, and laments how weak and reliant she has become, but accepts her fate nonetheless. After sending Yui home, the others speak with Yoshifumi, who remembers his personal vow to live carefree and decides to go visit Nana to tell her about his love for Yui. Afterwards, Yoshifumi reconfirms to Yui he loves her for who she is. This encourages Yui to stop running away and facing her own problems, embracing Yoshifumi and overcoming her androphobia. Afterwards, Himeko becomes suspicious of Taichi hiding something from everyone.
13	"As Long as the Five of Us Are Together"; Transliteration: "Kono Gonin ga Ireba" (Japanese: この五人がいれば)	September 30, 2012
As Taichi is forced to tell the others what he had been hiding, the second Heartseed reminds them of the consequences, making the age revert phenomenon happen at random times and including Taichi in the phenomenon, which forces them to stay at the building to avoid others discovering themselves. Iori becomes stressed from believing Reika is in danger from her violent second husband, who wants to get back together with her. Iori, briefly turning younger for a short period and regaining memories of that age, is stopped by the others when she tries to head off on her own, as they tell her she shouldn't try to do this alone and ask for help, which she does after much needed pep talk. As Taichi, Iori and Himeko reach the house and hear violent noises, they are forced to retreat after Iori turns into a baby. Just then, the first Heartseed approaches them, ending the age revert phenomenon and offering Iori the opportunity to go back in time and rectify some of the bad decisions she made in her youth. After some encouragement by Taichi and Himeko, Iori declines his offer, saying her past mistakes have allowed her to become the person she is now. Afterwards, everyone goes with Iori to see Reika, where they both realize they had both made mistakes trying to make the other happy. After Reika gains the encouragement to turn her second husband away, Iori gives thanks to everyone who made her who she is. Yui apologizes to Chinatsu, promising to meet her at the next karate tournament. As winter break comes to an end, Iori starts to question if she truly loves Taichi.
Michi Random
14	"The Days Fall Apart"; Transliteration: "Kowareteyuku Hibi" (Japanese: 壊れてゆく日々)	December 30, 2012
Heartseed puts the gang through another phenomenon, in which their true emotions will be randomly transmitted to each other, shown when Iori turns Taichi down when he asks to start dating her three days later. As Valentine's Day comes and Maiko suggests Taichi turn his attention towards Himeko, the gang grows concerned when they learn Gotō will only be able to be an advisor for one club, meaning they will have to outdo the Jazz Band Club in a presentation in order to keep him. While the discussion turns to Valentine's Day, both Himeko's feelings for Taichi and Taichi's rejection by Iori gets transmitted to the others. As Himeko tries to get Iori to speak her reasons, Iori's selfish thoughts end up getting transmitted to everyone, which in turn leads Iori to hear everyone's concerned thoughts about her, including a harsh one from Himeko. When Himeko asks Iori about it privately, Iori responds the experiences with Heartseed has affected her decision making, which makes her uncertain about if she actually loves Taichi or not. Afterwards, Taichi and Himeko have a talk, where she confronts him for not talking to her first before he asked Iori out, listing the things he likes about Himeko, although still pointing out he is in love with Iori. As the gang decides what to do for their presentation, Yoshifumi hears Iori's thoughts about how everyone has their own idea of her personality. Later, Heartseed approaches Yoshifumi and notices how useless he is, which urges Yoshifumi to strengthen his resolve with thoughts of Yui, who also hears his thoughts.
15	"You Don't See It, You Don't Get It"; Transliteration: "Nanimo Mietenai Nanimo Wakattenai" (Japanese: なにも見えてない なにもわかってない)	December 30, 2012
As Iori struggles with her identity, she ends up being cold and distancing herself from everyone around her, first shown when she turns down Shōto Shiroyama, a boy from the Jazz Band Club. also angering Kaoru Setouchi, who reprimands her for this, but Iori brushes off her threats and offends her, unintentionally making enemies with her in the process. When Taichi hears Himeko thinking about disbanding the Student Cultural Society, she explains it as a possible method to stop Heartseed from interfering with them, though Taichi easily tells she does not want it to come to that. Concerned about Iori, Yui later tries to reason with her, but Iori denounces her claims, stating if she likes her no matter who she is, then she's missing the point of what liking someone means. At the moment, Yui's telepathic transmission activates, stating her horror at what Iori has become. Knowing how she really feels, Iori tells Yui they can no longer be friends and leaves. As Yui is approached by Heartseed in the evening, she resolves to stop relying on others so much, later giving Taichi some encouragement to help save Iori. The next day, Himeko tries to get Iori to say what she truly feels, in which Iori responds by saying it is Himeko's selfishness concerning Taichi is to blame.
16	"Determination and Resolution"; Transliteration: "Kakugo to Hyōkai" (Japanese: 覚悟と氷解)	December 30, 2012
As the gang continues on their presentation without Iori, Taichi makes a bold statement in class in order to quell the rumors surrounding Iori. However, Kaoru is not fooled by this and plots to scheme something as payback, worrying Iori in the process. Later, the gang returns to the clubroom to find their presentation has been torn to shreds. Despite the others putting it aside and deciding to remake the project from scratch, Iori discovers this, becomes infuriated at Kaoru for supposedly getting others involved and threatens to get revenge. This forces Taichi and Himeko to stop Iori in her tracks. They manage to stop her from hurting Kaoru. After calming her down, Himeko forces Iori to explain why she's distancing herself by sharing an embarrassing dream about Taichi. Iori eventually breaks down, and due to all the stress and suffering the Heartseed incidents have caused her, she reveals she's had enough of the suffering and how she cannot stand to keep up her fake, cheerful personality anymore. Himeko reprimands her, stating she shouldn't care what other people think and she should just live the way she wants to, whilst Taichi mentions he still loves her even if it was not her true personality. As Iori asks to think about it, Himeko encounters the group of boys who were responsible for messing up the clubroom, and when she tries to confront them, she ends up being kidnapped.
17	"Connecting Hearts"; Transliteration: "Kokoro o Tsunaide" (Japanese: 心をつないで)	December 30, 2012
As Taichi, Yui and Yoshifumi learn of Himeko's kidnapping via the emotion transmission and rush to save her, Iori remains conflicted over what she should do, but inevitably decides to follow Taichi and Himeko's advice and live for herself. As the others start fighting against the boys who kidnapped Himeko, one of them puts a knife towards her. Just then, Iori arrives and manages to use the emotion transmission to get Himeko to safety and taking down the last guy. Kaoru, who showed resentment towards Iori for turning down Shōto in the past, apologizes for taking her actions too far. Noticing Kaoru also changed personalities to be accepted by others, Iori gives Kaoru the same advice she was once given before and soon befriends Kaoru. As the gang makes their way home, one of the kidnappers comes at them with a metal pipe, hitting Taichi as he protects Himeko. After Taichi and Iori have a mental discussion via the emotion transmission, where they decide to start their relationship from scratch, Taichi awakens and decides to ask Himeko out, to which she agrees. Elsewhere, Iori is suddenly greeted by Heartseed, who tells her the phenomenon is over. Iori accuses him of turning her against her friends, but he denies it and tells her she learned something from it and he takes his leave. As the phenomenon comes to its conclusion, Gotō is impressed by the gang's presentation and decides to continue moderating both clubs. Maiko tells Taichi her father arrested the kidnappers and they won't be bothering them again. With Taichi and Himeko start dating and Iori making friends again, the gang enter the new school year with their paths ahead of them.

=== Visual novel ===
A visual novel developed by Banpresto and published by Bandai Namco Entertainment under the title Kokoro Connect Yochi Random (ココロコネクト ヨチランダム, Heart Connect Random Prediction) was released on the PlayStation Portable on November 22, 2012.

== Reception ==
Theron Martin of Anime News Network (ANN) published a positive review covering the first eight episodes of the anime series. Despite finding criticism in the "erratic artistic merits" of the show's overall aesthetic and the resolution of issues being handled "too easily and simply", he gave praise to the main cast for their deep characterizations, the first two arcs having "a good balance of light humor and varying degrees of drama" (singling out the second arc as the strongest), and the voice actors for conveying their characters during the first arc's body switching moments, concluding that: "Kokoro Connect is not an outstanding series so far, but it exploits its defining gimmicks effectively enough to avoid being labeled as a heavily-derivative, run-of-the-mill one." Bamboo Dong reviewed the home video release for the same website in 2013. While commending the show's premise for having its characters confront personal problems through imaginative scenarios and the talents of the English voice actors, he criticized the writers for utilizing "lazy storytelling and [lazy] conflict resolution" when dealing with various societal issues, concluding that: "Kokoro Connect is a fine little series for what it is, but it could have been magnificent."

Carlos Ross, writing for THEM Anime Reviews, reviewed the TV series and its continuation Michi Random: He was critical of Heartseed as the catalyst for the supernatural events feeling "contrived, artificial or outright cringeworthy" but was positive towards the "impressive character work" of the ensemble cast and their interactions with each other being "realistically fluid and constantly evolving" like real-life relationships. Ross wrote that despite a "superfluous" subplot, the underutilization of Yui and Yoshifumi, and some "blatant plot holes" towards the conclusion, he praised Michi Random for putting the focus on Iori and showing the main cast being "strong-willed and determined" in their latest predicament, calling it "a fitting endcap to a light, but likable school drama, and brings this saga to a satisfying close while hinting at more to come."

Fellow ANN editor Rebecca Silverman reviewed the first volume of the 2011 manga adaptation in 2014. She wrote that it felt "decidedly underwhelming" with CUTEG's "cute and attractive" illustrations failing to portray the "emotional pull" and body swap moments of the previous works, concluding that: "I really enjoyed the anime and was excited to read this, but it fell far short of the mark with confusing body switches and art that's more cute than useful."

== See also ==
- K-On!, 2009 anime series with characters designed by Yukiko Horiguchi
- Tamako Market, 2013 anime series with characters designed Yukiko Horiguchi
