= Demons' Crest =

Japanese light novel series

- First light novel volume cover, featuring Yuuma (left) and Sawa Ashihara (right)

デモンズ・クレスト (Demonzu Kuresuto)
- Genre: Adventure; Fantasy; Science fiction
- Light novel
- Written by: Reki Kawahara
- Illustrated by: Yukiko Horiguchi
- Published by: ASCII Media Works
- English publisher: NA: Yen Press
- Imprint: Dengeki Bunko
- Original run: November 10, 2022 – present
- Volumes: 4
- Manga
- Written by: Reki Kawahara; Koroku Takano
- Illustrated by: TOmoe
- Published by: Akatsuki (online serialization in Japanese); Media Factory (print in Japanese); Webtoon (online serialization in English)
- Imprint: MF Comics
- Magazine: HykeComic (application)
- Original run: November 6, 2022 – present
- Volumes: 3
- Original net animation

Devils' Crest
- Directed by: Shinji Ushiro (chief); Kenichirō Komaya
- Written by: Eiji Umehara
- Music by: Yuki Hayashi; Naoyuki Chikatani
- Studio: Production I.G
- Licensed by: Amazon Prime Video
- Released: November 6, 2026 – present
- Episodes: 4
- icon

Demons' Crest (Japanese: デモンズ・クレスト, Hepburn: Demonzu Kuresto) is a Japanese light novel series written by Reki Kawahara and illustrated by Yukiko Horiguchi. It has been published by ASCII Media Works under its Dengeki Bunko imprint since November 2022. A webtoon adaptation illustrated by TOmoe began serialization on Akatsuki's HykeComic platform the same month. The light novel series has been licensed for English release in North America by Yen Press under its Yen On imprint. An original net anime (ONA) adaptation, officially titled in English as Devils' Crest and produced by Production I.G, premiered worldwide on Amazon Prime Video in November 2026.

== Plot ==
On June 6, 2031, playtesting begins for the VRMMO game Actual Magic. Yuuma Ashihara, an elementary school student, is one of the play testers. He is initially amazed by the realistic fantasy world the game created. However, upon logging out, the game begins fusing with reality, turning one of the most beautiful girls in his class, Sumika Watamaki, into a horrifying monster. Yuuma must figure out how to survive despite the chaos and confusion of the situation.

== Characters ==
Yuuma Ashihara (芦原 佑馬, Ashihara Yūma)
Voiced by: Tomo Muranaka (PV), Haruka Shiraishi (anime) (Japanese); Julian Stamboulieh (English)
Sawa Ashihara (芦原 佐羽, Ashihara Sawa)
Voiced by: Miyu Tomita (PV), Konomi Inagaki (anime) (Japanese); Romane Denis (English)
Kenji Kondou (近堂 健児, Kondō Kenji) / Kenk (コンケン, Konken)
Voiced by: Yūya Hirose (anime) (Japanese); Anthony Therrien (English)
Minagi Sano (茶野 水凪, Sano Minagi)
Voiced by: Satomi Amano (anime) (Japanese); Teale Bishopric (English)
Teruki Sugamo (須鴨 光輝, Sugamo Teruki)
Voiced by: Yūsuke Kobayashi (anime) (Japanese); Alexandre Bacon^{Ep. 1 credits} (English)
Aria Misono (三園 愛莉亜, Misono Aria)
Voiced by: Maaya Uchida (anime) (Japanese); Léa Roy (English)
Kai Kisanuki (木佐貫 櫂, Kusanuki Kai)
Voiced by: Rie Murakawa (anime)
Sumika Watamaki (綿巻 すみか, Watamaki Sumika)
Voiced by: Sora Amamiya (PV, anime)
Shin Haizaki (灰崎シン, Haisaki Shin)
Voiced by: Atsushi Tamaru
Kakeru Niki (仁木翔, Niki Kakeru)
Voiced by: Ayumu Murase

== Media ==
=== Light novels ===
The series was announced by ASCII Media Works on September 5, 2022, and the first volume was published by ASCII Media Works under its Dengeki Bunko imprint on November 10, 2022. In a press release, Yen Press announced that it had licensed the series in English. The English version is translated by James Balzer, and the first volume was released on June 18, 2024.

No.	Title	Original release date	English release date
1	Reality Erosion; Genjitsu∽Shinshoku (現実∽侵食)	November 10, 2022; 978-4-04-914677-6	June 18, 2024; 978-1-9753-9352-6
2	Otherworld Manifestation; Ikai∽Kengen (異界∽顕現)	July 7, 2023; 978-4-04-915151-0	October 29, 2024; 978-1-9753-9890-3
3	Demonspawn Awakening; Majin∽Kakusei (魔人∽覚醒)	November 8, 2024; 978-4-04-915801-4	December 30, 2025; 979-8-8554-2241-2
4	Haken∽Sōdatsu (覇権∽争奪)	December 10, 2025; 978-4-04-916868-6	—

=== Webtoon ===
A webtoon adaptation written by Koroku Takano, illustrated by TOmoe (TOもえ), and produced by whomor inc began serialization on Akatsuki's HykeComic webtoon platform under the HxSTOON label on November 6, 2022, soon before the first light novel release. After the initial batch of chapters, it started a weekly serialization schedule, which moved to a biweekly schedule on January 7, 2024, and after multiple periods of hiatus in 2025 moved to a monthly schedule starting on December 7, 2025. Its chapters have been collected unscrolled in tankōbon volumes by Media Factory under its MF Comics (MFC) imprint. The webtoon received an English version on the Webtoon platform starting on October 30, 2026.

No.	Release date	ISBN
1	June 21, 2024	978-4-04-683672-4
2	October 23, 2026	978-4-04-660504-7
3	October 23, 2026	978-4-04-660505-4

=== Anime ===
An anime adaptation was announced on December 2, 2025. It was later revealed to be an original net animation (ONA) that would be produced by Production I.G and directed by Kenichirō Komaya, with Shinji Ushiro serving as chief director, Eiji Umehara handling series composition, Yukiko Horiguchi redesigning the characters for animation, and Yuki Hayashi and Naoyuki Chikatani composing the music. Titled in English as Devils' Crest, the series premiered worldwide on Amazon Prime Video on November 6, 2026, with the first two episodes, and will run for two consecutive cours. The opening theme song is "Shinka" (シンカ; 'Evolution'), performed by Ado, and the ending theme song is "ReaL", performed by Soala.

==== Episodes ====
No.	Title	Directed by	Written by	Storyboarded by	Original release date
1	"Encroachment"; Transliteration: "Shinshoku" (Japanese: 侵食)	Fumihiro Matsui	Eiji Umehara	Shinji Ushiro	November 6, 2026
As Yuuma Ashihara awakens from inside a full-dive gaming capsule called a Caliculus, he recalls the events leading up to that point. Yuuma and his sixth-grade classmates were beta testing the VRMMORPG game, Actual Magic. Yuuma, playing as a monster tamer, captured a rabbit during a hunt with his party members Sawa Ashihara, Kenji "Konken" Kondou, and Minagi "Nagi" Sano. Afterwards, they took on a dungeon quest with their remaining playtime to win a bet Konken made with Teruaki "Gamo" Sugamo. Using Yuuma's rabbit, they navigated through the dungeon and arrived at the gate to the boss room just before Gamo's party. Both parties then battled the dungeon boss, a red dragon, in separate boss rooms. After feeling out the dragon's attack patterns, Yuuma's party quickly defeated the dragon. With their playtime ending, the party attempted to log out, but found no way to log out and instead, the servers sent shockwaves to the Caliculi causing the players to pass out. Upon awakening, Yuuma found Sawa unconscious with a bloodied face. Back to the present, Yuma gets attacked by Gamo's party member Sumika Watamaki, who was turned into a monster.
2	"Transformation"; Transliteration: "Henyō" (Japanese: 変容)	Yūma Imura	Eiji Umehara	Takeshi Mori	November 6, 2026
Yuuma and Konken struggle fighting Sumika before they are saved by Sawa, who has transformed into a humanoid devil. Just as Sawa is about to kill Sumika, Yuuma steps in and captures Sumika instead like he did with the rabbit as their game stats are also in effect in the real world. After passing out from exhaustion and waking up again, Sawa explains that the game world is integrating with the real world and that dying in the game means death in real life. She mentions that the senses of touch, sight, and sound have been virtually stimulated, but not taste and smell, and that her appearance as a devil was not by choice. Yuuma opens Nagi's Caliculus and finds it empty despite the emergency lever to open it being unused. While searching for Nagi, the three find their classmate Yukihisa Miura brutally killed, which Yuuma confirms was Sumika's doing. After laying Miura to rest inside a Caliculus, they hear loud noises coming from below. The three find out that the banging sound came from a boss monster in the game, and find several IO-Tage Inc. employees dead.
3	"Awakening"; Transliteration: "Kakusei" (Japanese: 覚醒)	Shigeru Ueda	Daisuke Ishibashi	Takeshi Mori	November 13, 2026
As the Conehead Bruiser, a monster with high defense stats, breaks down the metal barricade that several classmates took shelter behind, Yuuma comes up with a plan to fight the Bruiser. Sawa and Konken draw the Bruiser's attention while Yumua gets ethanol from the staff room. Yuuma throws the ethanol into the Brusier's mouth and engulfs it in flames. However, the sprinklers activate before the Bruiser's HP is completely depleted. Yuuma summons Sumika to slay the Bruiser just as he was about to be eaten by it. Realizing that Sumika's soul is not completely gone, he promises to return her to normal. Afterwards, the three form a party to monitor each other, then learn that their storage box can hold both both real and game items. With no telling how long the class will be trapped, Yuuma and Sawa stock up on food, water, and supplies. Sawa puts on an oversized jacket to conceal her wings and horns, and points out to Yuuma that his hair is blue, implying that everybody's bodies are changing. Meanwhile, Gamo confronts Konken and accuses him of being a monster.
4	"Suspicion"; Transliteration: "Saigi" (Japanese: 猜疑)	Shinya Sadamitsu	Gigaemon Ichikawa	Takeshi Mori	November 20, 2026
5	"Devil"; Transliteration: "Akuma" (Japanese: 悪魔)	TBA	TBA	TBA	November 27, 2026
