= Ayuru Ōhashi =

Japanese voice actress and singer

- 大橋 歩夕
- Born: April 28, 1984 (age 42); Tokyo, Japan
- Other name: Erika Nakai
- Occupations: Voice actress; singer
- Years active: 2005–present
- Agent: Mausu Promotion
- Height: 153 cm (5 ft 0 in)
- Website: ayuru.net

Ayuru Ōhashi (大橋 歩夕, Ōhashi Ayuru; born April 28, 1984), formerly known as Erika Nakai (仲井 絵里香, Nakai Erika), is a Japanese voice actress and singer from Tokyo. Some of her major roles are Aoi in Wish Upon the Pleiades original net animation (ONA) and its anime adaptation, Eila Ilmatar Juutilainen in Strike Witches, Adele in Horizon in the Middle of Nowhere, Oryō in Girls und Panzer, and Anju Yuuki in Love Live! School Idol project. She was associated with ToriTori agency until June 2015. She is currently associated with Mausu Promotion.

== Filmography ==
=== Anime ===
==== Television series ====
Year	Title	Role	Notes	Source
2005	Speed Grapher	Girl		
2005	Sugar Sugar Rune	Anana	Credited as Erika Nakai	
2005	Happy 7: The TV Manga	Nene Tokuda	Credited as Erika Nakai	
2005	Artificial Insect Kabuto Borg Victory by Victory	Ayumi, Mariko Ibaraki		
2005	Idaten Jump	Girl		
2006	Yōkai Ningen Bem	Mari Kabeya		
2008–12	Strike Witches	Eila Ilmatar Juutilainen	Also Strike Witches 2, movie Also credited as Erika Nakai	
2009	Saki	Tomoki Sawamura		
2011	Wish Upon the Pleiades	Aoi	ONA	
2011	Hoshizora e Kakaru Hashi	Ayumu Hoshino	Also OVA	
2011	Double-J	Hajime Usami		
2011	Horizon on the Middle of Nowhere	Adele Barrufet		
2012	Medaka Box	Harigane Onigase		
2012	Girls und Panzer	Oryō		
2013	Love Live!	Anju Yuuki		
2014	Space Dandy	Eldest daughter		
2015	Wish Upon the Pleiades	Aoi		
2016	High School Fleet	Momo Aoki		
2016	Brave Witches	Eila Ilmatar Juutilainen	ep.7	
2017	Nora, Princess, and Stray Cat	Euracia of End		
2019	Strike Witches 501st Unit, Taking Off!	Eila Ilmatar Juutilainen		

==== Films ====
Year	Title	Role	Notes	Source
2015	Girls und Panzer der Film	Oryō		
2017	Girls und Panzer das Finale: Part 1	Oryō, Ship department member		
2019	Girls und Panzer das Finale: Part 2	Oryō, Maiko		
2020	High School Fleet: The Movie	Momo Aoki		
2021	Girls und Panzer das Finale: Part 3	Oryō		

=== Video games ===
Year	Title	Role	Notes	Source
	Sudeki: Sennen no Akatsuki no Monogatari	Emily Rankin		
2014	Girls und Panzer: Senshadō, Kiwamemasu!	Oryo		
2014	Sousyu Sensinkan-gakuen Hachimyoujin	Hyakuonisora亡	PS Vita	

== Discography ==
=== Singles ===
List of major CD releases, with selected chart positions
Release Date	Title	Catalogue Number (Japan)	Oricon	
Release Date	Title	Catalogue Number (Japan)	Peak position	Weeks charted
2010	Fantastic (ファンタぢっく)	Boundee: XQIT-1001	89	1
2011	Romantic (ロマンちっく)	XQIT-1005	73	1
2011	Plustic (プラスちっく)	XQIT-1008	161	1
2013	Gold Illumination (金色イルミネーション)	XQIT-1024	–	–
2014	Natsuiro Fiction (夏色フィクション)	XQIT-1026	–	–
2014	Mirai Torabera (未来トラベラー)	XQIT-1034	–	–

=== Compilation albums ===
List of albums, with selected chart positions
Title	Album details (Japan)	Oricon
Title	Album details (Japan)	Peak position
Fantasista (ファンタぢすた)	Released: March 28, 2012; Label: Boundee; Catalog No.: XQIT-1010; Tracklist : 1. Opening; 2. Hello,goodbye; 3. Dekakemasyo(reading); 4. Teddy Bear; 5. Cute Ni Fantasic; 6. Hello,goodby (off Vocal); 7. Teddy Bear (off Vocal); 8. Cute Ni Fantasic (off Vocal)	161
Mini Ako (ミニあこ)	Released: March 20, 2013; Label: Boundee; Catalog No.: XQIT-1012; Tracklist : 1. Mermaid Acoustic Version; 2. Kokode; 3. Yozora Wo Miagete Lost Romantics Acoustic Version; 4. Anatato; 5. Harunonioi Acoustic Version; 6. Kaerimichi; 7. Angel Girl Acoustic Version; 8. Mermaid Acoustic Version Off Vocal; 9. Yozora Wo Miagete Lost Romantics Acoustic Version Off Vocal; 10. Harunonioi Acoustic Version Off Vocal; 11. Angel Girl Acoustic Version Off Vocal	–
Chic Remastered (ちっくリマスター)	Released: July 30, 2014; Label: Boundee; Catalog No.: XQIT-1035; Tracklist : 1. Eternity; 2. Opening; 3. Hello Goodbye; 4. Dekakemasyo; 5. Teddy Bear; 6. Cute ni Fantasic; 7. Yozora wo Miagete Lost Romantics; 8. Omocha no Kimochi 1; 9. Angel Girl; 10. Omocha no Kimochi 2; 11. Soyokaze to Senaka; 12. Mermaid; 13. Issyo ni 14. Shinainaru; 15. Shizen na Kimochi Soshite Korekara mo 16. Plus Going; 17. Restart; 18. Eternity Hissatsu Version	–
