= Asuka Ōgame =

Japanese voice actress

- 大亀 あすか
- Born: Hiroshima Prefecture, Japan
- Occupation: Voice actress
- Years active: 2009–present
- Agent: Sigma Seven
- Spouse: Nobuhiko Okamoto (m. 2020)

Asuka Ōgame (大亀 あすか, Ōgame Asuka) is a Japanese voice actress from Hiroshima Prefecture, Japan. She is affiliated with Sigma Seven.

== Biography ==
Ōgame stated that she became a voice actress when she saw the stage where the voice actors appeared, felt fresh and attractive, and knew the diversity of the profession of voice actors. She passed the 2nd Sigma Seven public audition held in 2007 while attending Sogo Gakuen Human Academy (Asuka Nishi, Mai Fuchigami and Atsushi Tamaru) and made her debut in 2009. She played the role of Mayshen Trinden in her debut work, Chrome Shelled Regios. A debut support project titled "Ganbare Mayshen" was held on a related site.

Ōgame mainly voices female characters. In 2009, she played the role of Maki Hoshikawa as the main heroine of the video game Tokimeki Memorial 4.

She also actively engages in music activities, such as singing an opening theme under the name of Erio Tōwa in Ground Control to Psychoelectric Girl and singing the theme song for "Tansu Mobile Phone Atsume Thai \ (^ o ^) /", sponsored by the Ministry of Economy, Trade and Industry.

Since October 2014, she has also been active as a professional member of the Japan Professional Mahjong Association. She left the organization in April 2022.

On March 21, 2020, Ōgame confirmed that she is married to Nobuhiko Okamoto after Shūkan Bunshun reported he had an extramarital affair with an unnamed woman.

== Filmography ==
=== Television animation ===
2009

- Chrome Shelled Regios - Mayshen Torinden
- Heaven's Lost Property - Daedalus

2010

- Chu-Bra!! - Akemi; Shimada
- Hanamaru Kindergarten - Daigo; Maika
- Kiss×sis - Mikazuki Kiryū
- Omamori Himari - Lizlet L. Chelsie
- Heaven's Lost Property ~Forte~ - Daedalus

2011

- Denpa Onna to Seishun Otoko - Erio Tōwa
- Rio: Rainbow Gate! - Yang-Yang
- Ro-Kyu-Bu! - Satsuki Kakizono

2012

- Kono Naka ni Hitori, Imōto ga Iru! - Mana Tendō
- Kokoro Connect - Rina Yaegashi
- Medaka Box - Aria Ariake
- Saki Achiga-hen episode of Side-A - Himeko Tsuruta

2013

- Vividred Operation - Momo Isshiki
- Photo Kano - Rina Yunoki

2014

- Dragonar Academy - Lukka Saarinen

2015

- Kōfuku Graffiti - Kirin Morino

2016

- Girls Beyond the Wasteland - Class representative

=== Original video animation ===
2010

- Tokimeki Memorial 4 Original Animation: Hajimari no Finder - Maki Hoshikawa

2011

- Baby Princess 3D Paradise 0 - Asahi Amatsuka

2012

- Moe Can Change! - Sarari
- A Town Where You Live - Student

2013

- OVA no Naka ni Hitori, Imōto ga Iru! - Mana Tendō

=== Video games ===
2009

- Tokimeki Memorial 4 - Maki Hoshikawa

2010

- Abyss of the Sacrifice - Jitka

2011

- Dead End: Orchestral Manoeuvres in the Dead End - Grete
- Yome Collection - Erio Tōwa

2012

- Atelier Ayesha ~Tasogare no Daichi no Renkinjutsushi~ - Nanaca Grunden

2014

- Dengeki Bunko: Fighting Climax - Erio Tōwa
- Granblue Fantasy - Sara

2016

- Girls Beyond the Wasteland - Class representative

2017

- School Girl/Zombie Hunter - Sayuri Akiba

2023

- Blue Archive - Momiji Akiizumi
