= Alderamin on the Sky =

Japanese light novel series

- First light novel cover

ねじ巻き精霊戦記 天鏡のアルデラミン (Nejimaki Seirei Senki: Tenkyō no Aruderamin)
- Genre: Military history, Fantasy
- Light novel
- Written by: Bokuto Uno
- Illustrated by: Sanbasō (volume 1-5); Ryūtetsu (volume 6-14)
- Published by: ASCII Media Works
- Imprint: Dengeki Bunko
- Original run: June 10, 2012 – August 10, 2018
- Volumes: 14
- Manga
- Illustrated by: Taiki Kawakami
- Published by: ASCII Media Works
- Imprint: Dengeki Comics
- Magazine: Dengeki Maoh
- Original run: May 27, 2014 – May 27, 2017
- Volumes: 7
- Anime television series
- Directed by: Tetsuo Ichimura
- Produced by: Nobuhiro Nakayama; Yasutaka Kurosaki; Jun Fukuda; Yukihiro Ito; Yuki Yoshida
- Written by: Shōgo Yasukawa
- Music by: Keiji Inai
- Studio: Madhouse
- Licensed by: Crunchyroll (streaming); SEA: Muse Communication
- Original network: Tokyo MX, KBS, Sun TV, TV Aichi, BS Fuji, AT-X
- Original run: July 9, 2016 – September 30, 2016
- Episodes: 13
- icon

Alderamin on the Sky (Japanese: ねじ巻き精霊戦記 天鏡のアルデラミン, Hepburn: Nejimaki Seirei Senki: Tenkyō no Aruderamin; lit. 'Wind-Up Spirit Chronicles: Alderamin on the Sky') is a Japanese light novel series written by Bokuto Uno and illustrated by Sanbasō (volumes 1–5) and Ryūtetsu (volume 6–14) between 2012 and 2018. A manga based on the series, written by Taiki Kawakami, was published in Dengeki Maoh. An anime adaptation produced by Madhouse and directed by Tetsuo Ichimura aired from July to September 2016.

== Summary ==
The Katvarna Empire is at war with the neighboring Republic of Kioka. In the Katvarna Empire, Ikuta hates war, but due to certain circumstances, he grudgingly takes the High Grade Military Officer Exam. No one would have expected that this 17-year-old young man would eventually become a commander. Ikuta survives this world engulfed in war with his intellect.

== Characters ==
Ikta Solork (イクタ・ソローク, Ikuta Sorōku)
Voiced by: Nobuhiko Okamoto, MAO (childhood) (Japanese); Joel McDonald (Adult), Terri Doty (childhood) (English)
Spirit: Light Spirit Kus Voiced by: Eri Suzuki (Japanese); Clifford Chapin (English)
Even though Ikta is an extremely intelligent war strategist, he abhors war and despises being assigned as a soldier, due to what happened to his father Bada Sankrei. He is quite frank and has no trouble voicing his opinions (which are usually pessimistic but truthful), however aggravating it may be. Slothful by nature, he has a habit of ending battles in the most convenient way possible. He enjoys chasing after older women, primarily Haroma, and hates handsome men. After being made an Imperial Knight for his part in the rescue of Princess Chamille, Ikta said he has now become the three things he never wanted to be: a soldier, a noble and a hero.
Yatorishino Igsem (ヤトリシノ・イグセム, Yatorishino Igusemu)
Voiced by: Risa Taneda (Japanese); Caitlin Glass (Adult), Alison Viktorin (childhood) (English)
Spirit: Flame Spirit Shia Voiced by: Haruka Yamazaki
The Igsem family was given the duty and the honor to wear two swords to protect the Kingdom. Yatorishino is the latest of this family and possibly the best having been trained since she was a little girl. Due to a deal made between her and Ikta, both have become companions since their academy days. She has bright red hair. She wields a saber and a main gauche when fighting, though she uses the parrying dagger in a much more offensive style. She is extremely loyal to the Kingdom and will immediately attack Ikta should he overstep his bounds while complaining about the kingdom to a higher up. At one time when she attacked a group of men that tried to kidnap Princess Chamille, she was in such a blood rage that after it was over, Ikta had to talk her down to finally get her to drop her swords.
Chamille Kitra Katvarnmaninik (シャミーユ・キトラ・カトヴァンマニニク, Shamīyu Kitora Katovanmaniniku)
Voiced by: Inori Minase (Japanese); Megan Shipman (English)
Third princess of the imperial family. She joins Ikta's group after he rescues her from drowning. She understands how intelligent Ikta is and how he hides it with his laziness. She holds him in high regard, not just for his intelligence but for his outspoken personality as well, something many lack. She hates how the country is in the latter part of its decline and she wants to destroy it, so it can start over again. She enlists Ikta's help for this as all the others either lack the intelligence, like Torway or Matthew, or are too loyal to the country to destroy it even if it's for the better, like Yatorishino.
Torway Remion (トルウェイ・レミオン, Toruwei Remion)
Voiced by: Ryōsuke Kanemoto (Japanese); Austin Tindle (English)
Spirit: Wind Spirit Safi
The Remion family is known for having some of the best marksmen in the Kingdom. An academy graduate who meets Ikta and the others on the ship before the High Officers exam. He is revealed to be extremely proficient with guns, and can easily hit a target from afar. However he cannot hit a close up target as he cannot view them objectively. Ikta suggests that he pick off the enemy from far as possible so that he cannot see them clearly enough to view them as human, which works very well. Torway loves to nickname people, usually his male friends, even though Ikta is really against it. He uses an air spirit.
Matthew Tetdrich (マシュー・テトジリチ, Mashū Tetojirichi)
Voiced by: Junji Majima (Japanese); Shawn Gann (English)
Spirit: Wind Spirit Tsuu
Ikta's and Yatorishino's classmate in the academy. The three meet each other again on the ship heading for the army exam. His family, Tetdrich, is part of a minor noble family that has low recognition. He desires to make his family better known. Since Yatorishino and Torway are part of more recognized noble families he sees them as great rivals and often compares himself to them, hoping to beat them one day. He often engages in chess games with all the characters in an attempt to improve his ability to think strategically.
Haroma Becker (ハローマ・ベッケル, Harōma Bekkeru)
Voiced by: Haruka Chisuga (Japanese); Leah Clark (English)
Spirit: Water Spirit Miru
A nurse who meets Ikta and the others on the ship before their army exam. She is considered very beautiful by Ikta who often flirts with her, which leaves her flustered. She has five younger brothers as stated by her, whom she wants to take care of. She wants to be a nurse in the army, and often takes care of the group.

== Media ==
=== Light novels ===
Bokuto Uno began publishing the light novels with illustrations by Sanbasō under ASCII Media Works' Dengeki Bunko imprint in June 2012. After Sanbasō began suffering from poor health, Ryūtetsu took over illustrating the series, starting with the sixth novel.

No.	Japanese release date	Japanese ISBN
1	June 10, 2012	978-4-04-886559-3
2	November 10, 2012	978-4-04-886988-1
3	April 10, 2013	978-4-04-891533-5
4	September 10, 2013	978-4-04-891906-7
5	March 8, 2014	978-4-04-866437-0
6	October 10, 2014	978-4-04-869011-9
7	March 10, 2015	978-4-04-869336-3
8	October 10, 2015	978-4-04-865456-2
9	April 9, 2016	978-4-04-865879-9
10	July 9, 2016	978-4-04-892196-1
11	November 10, 2016	978-4-04-892471-9
12	July 7, 2017	978-4-04-893219-6
13	December 9, 2017	978-4-04-893517-3
14	August 10, 2018	978-4-04-893962-1

=== Manga ===
A manga adaptation by Taiki Kawakami began serialization in the July 2014 issue of ASCII Media Works imprint Dengeki Comics' seinen manga magazine Dengeki Maoh on May 27, 2014.

No.	Japanese release date	Japanese ISBN
1	October 10, 2014	978-4-04-866915-3
2	March 10, 2015	978-4-04-869237-3
3	October 10, 2015	978-4-04-865435-7
4	March 10, 2016	978-4-04-865843-0
5	July 9, 2016	978-4-04-892137-4
6	December 10, 2016	978-4-04-892509-9
7	June 9, 2017	978-4-04-892973-8

=== Anime ===
An anime adaptation was announced at the Dengeki Bunko Autumn Festival 2015 on October 4, 2015. The adaptation was later revealed to be a television series in the December issue of Kodansha's Monthly Shōnen Sirius magazine on October 26, 2015. A trailer for the series was released during the Dengeki Bunko Haru no Saiten 2016 event on March 13, 2016.

The series is directed by Tetsuo Ichimura and written by Shogo Yasukawa, with animation by the studio Madhouse. Kunio Katsuki provided the character designs for the anime, while Yoshikazu Iwanami served as the series' sound director. Keiji Inai composed the music for the anime. The opening theme is "Tenkyō no Alderamin" (天鏡のアルデラミン; 'Alderamin on the Sky') by Kisida Kyoudan & The Akebosi Rockets, while the ending theme is "nameless" by Kano.

The series aired from July 9, 2016, (Note: The broadcast date for the first episode is listed as July 8, 2016 at 25:05, which is the same as July 9 at 1:05.) to September 30, 2016, on Tokyo MX. It then aired on KBS Kyoto, Sun TV, TV Aichi, and BS Fuji on July 11, and on AT-X on July 12. Crunchyroll streamed the series worldwide except Asia. The anime was released across seven Blu-ray & DVD volumes. The anime is licensed in North America by Crunchyroll and distributed by Funimation, who provided an English dub of the series. Funimation later premiered with its English dub in December 2016. Muse Communication licensed the series in Southeast Asia and streamed on Muse Asia YouTube channel.

==== Episodes ====
No.	Official English title (Note: All English titles are taken from Crunchyroll.) Original Japanese title	Directed by	Written by	Storyboarded by	Original release date	Ref.
1	"A Stormy Encounter"; Transliteration: "Arashi no Kaikō" (Japanese: 嵐の邂逅)	Masaki Matsumura	Shōgo Yasukawa	Tetsuo Ichimura	July 9, 2016	
Fresh out of school, Ikta Solork and Yatorishino Igsem embark on a ship to attend the second stage of the High Grade Military Officer Exam, where they meet Haroma Becker, Torway Remeon, and Matthew Tetdrich. During transit, a powerful storm forces everyone to abandon ship. After saving a young girl thrown overboard by the swaying vessel, the five reach land a couple of days later and take shelter in a cave. There, they discover the girl is Princess Chamille Kitra Katjvanmaninik of their homeland, the Katjvarna Empire. Over the following days, they ascertain that they have washed ashore in enemy territory within the Republic of Kioka and begin planning how to return home amidst the active war between the two nations. At night, Chamille leaves the cave for a moment and is nearly detected by a Kiokan patrol, prompting Ikta to surrender in her place before they can discover her.
2	"An Unwanted Medal of Honor"; Transliteration: "Fuhon'i naru Hōshō" (Japanese: 不本意なる褒賞)	Kunio Wakabayashi	Shōgo Yasukawa	Morio Asaka	July 16, 2016	
Interrogated at gunpoint by the Kiokan patrol, Ikta claims to be an asylum seeker from the Katjvarna Empire's Eastern Province who escaped with his mother, pleading with the soldiers to help her who is in the cave. Believing him, the patrols follow him back, where Ikta and the other High Grade Officer candidates ambush and kill them. The next day, after gathering intelligence and equipment from the dead soldiers, Ikta puts on a Kiokan uniform and urgently requests an audience with the local Kiokan commander. He reports that his patrol lost control of their hot air balloon—a valuable piece of hardware for the Republic's new Air Force—and claims the rest of the group are refugees willing to return it in exchange for safe passage back to Katjvarna, bluffing that one of the asylum seekers is piloting it when it is actually flying uncontrolled. The commander agrees, and the group returns to Katjvarna. With Chamille's ring proving her identity, the army thanks them, brings them to the capital, and awards them the title of Imperial Knights alongside acceptance as High Grade Military Officers despite missing the exam due to the storm.
3	"The Knights of the High-Level Officer's School"; Transliteration: "Kōtō Shikan Gakkō no Kishi-dan" (Japanese: 高等士官学校の騎士団)	Mihiro Yamaguchi	Shōgo Yasukawa	Naoyuki Itō	July 23, 2016	
Now High Grade Military Officer cadets, the group and Princess Chamille report to the Katjvarna Empire's High-Grade Officers School. During class, Chamille and Ikta quietly communicate via desk blackboards before the instructor calls on Ikta, who explains the lesson and goes further by detailing how mobility allows a smaller force to defeat a larger one. Later, Torway's older brother, Sariha Remeon, stops Matthew and Torway to berate Torway for his incompetence and thank Matthew for supposedly looking after him. Sleeping in a tree above, Ikta drops in to defend Torway and push back against Sariha, resulting in Ikta being violently assaulted until Yatori, Haroma, and Chamille intervene and Yatori beats two of the five attackers back before they leave. When the cadets are assigned platoons, Ikta's unit ignores him and trains independently due to his poor reputation and a story about him attempting to get close to their leader Suuya Mitcalif's mother. Soon after, Matthew learns an upcoming military exercise will pit combat veterans Sariha and Sushuraf Remeon alongside Yatori against Ikta, Torway, and Matthew, with Haroma serving as leader of a neutral medical corps. Doubting she can defeat them herself, Suuya agrees to yield command of the platoon to Ikta if he proves he can win the war game. Taking supreme command of the three platoons, Ikta has his troops discard extra gear for a fast march to a major river, where they chop and sink trees underwater the next day. Arriving at the suggested battleground a day later to find it empty, Sariha panics at being late when scouts locate Ikta's forces and rushes to engage, resulting in a standoff as the first force to cross risks getting bogged down and losing.
4	"Watchdogs of the Spirit Tree"; Transliteration: "Eireiju no Banken-tachi" (Japanese: 永霊樹の番犬たち)	Tomohiro Furukawa	Shōgo Yasukawa	Tomohiro Furukawa	July 30, 2016	
At the river standoff, Ikta orders Torway's platoon upstream, prompting Sariha to send Yatori's platoon to block a presumed flanking attempt. Ikta then orders his remaining two platoons to charge across the river, using the sunken logs for footing to avoid getting stuck and catching Sariha off guard. Having merely hidden in the forest rather than marching upstream, Torway's platoon joins the battle; outnumbered three platoons to two, Sariha freezes in indecision and suffers heavy losses before Yatori returns to protect him and cover a retreat. Seeking revenge, Sariha hides his troops along their retreat path expecting pursuit, but Ikta instead blockades the return route Sariha must follow to avoid automatic defeat. Forced to attack, Sariha orders his men to cheat by pretending not to notice hits, only for Torway to eliminate him with a paint shot to the back of the head. Ikta's forces unexpectedly charges rather than holding ground, prompting Torway's second brother, Sushuraf, to assume command and order another retreat. Ikta's post-battle speech wins over his subordinates. Meanwhile, noticing Chamille's sudden absence after she had consistently watched the exercise, Ikta deduces she has been kidnapped by her guards and forfeits the war game so both sides can rescue her. Using sharpened darts to make their practice ammunition lethal, Yatori's crossbowmen ambush the traitors before she eliminates the rest in melee combat. Interrogating the guard leader, Ikta learns the kidnapping was meant to catalyze reform over the politically motivated abandonment of the Eastern Province, which cost the life of a great general and many soldiers.
5	"Two in One"; Transliteration: "Futari de Hitotsu" (Japanese: 二人でひとつ)	Masaki Matsumura	Shōgo Yasukawa	Toshiya Shinohara	August 6, 2016	
Reflecting on the fury she felt while rescuing Princess Chamille, Yatori recalls her adolescence, when she first met Ikta and was introduced to the science he loves. Together, they participate in experiments under Anarai Khan, a renowned Imperial scientist later forced to flee to the Republic over his heretical work against the Church of Alderamin. While running errands and playing pranks together, Ikta discovers Yatori is unusually skilled at chess compared to his previous opponents. Later, Yatori joins Ikta and his family on a hike up a mountain where Ikta's father, Katjvarnan officer Bada Sankrei, is scheduled to conduct a survey. Reaching the top, Ikta's parents realize they forgot the surveying tools and hike back down to retrieve them, leaving the two children alone at the cottage. When a pack of wolves arrives, Ikta and Yatori fortify a storehouse and hole up inside, combining Ikta's tactical mind with Yatori's swordsmanship to survive until the pack is driven away.
6	"At the Base of the Stairs of God"; Transliteration: "Kami no Kizahashi no Fumoto Nite" (Japanese: 神の階の麓にて)	Yōsuke Hatta	Shinsuke Ōnishi	Naoyuki Itō	August 13, 2016	
After platoon training, Haroma finds Ikta under a tree reading a letter listing the scientific inventions Anarai Khan had provided to Kioka in exchange for asylum, sent so Katjvarna can avoid falling too far behind technologically and maintaining the balance between the two. Ikta, Matthew, and Torway discuss their upcoming field deployment to the Northern Garrison—where Ikta notes the local Shinak tribe's custom of women visiting men's beds at night—before joining Yatori, Haroma, and Chamille. At the garrison, they are greeted by its titular commander, Lieutenant General Tamtooktsk Safida, and Major Yuskushiram Taekk, who actually manages daily operations. At the welcoming dinner, Ikta meets officer Senpa Sazaruf, while Cavalry Platoon Commander Deinkun Hargunska, the garrison's top swordsman, challenges Yatori to a duel. Yatori swiftly defeats him, and Ikta explains to Chamille why the Igsem family must continue to duel in order to preserve their exclusive right to dual-wield in the army. The next day, Sazaruf leads the cadets and regular troops on a hike along the Alafatra Mountains, discussing past tensions with the Shinak and the recent peace, before learning Ikta skipped the exercise by voluntarily reporting to the detention barracks. Back at the garrison, Ikta stops an officer from striking Private First Class Kanna Temari while confiscating books from the women's barracks to sell for profit, goading him into punching a bookshelf so a large spider falls into his clothes and sends him fleeing. Ikta introduces himself to Kanna as her senior as a fellow scholar of science before Sazaruf drags him to the detention barracks, where Ikta slips away and shines Kusu's light into a cell that catches his eye.
7	"The Northern Katjvarna Rebellion"; Transliteration: "Katovāna Hokuiki Dōran" (Japanese: カトヴァーナ北域動乱)	Kunio Wakabayashi	Shinsuke Ōnishi	Morio Asaka	August 20, 2016	
Deinkun loses a chess match to Torway in 54 moves and marches away in anger. Dehydrated after four days without food or water, Ikta stumbles into the cafeteria, where Haroma's water spirit, Miru, provides water and Yatori gives him her saved snacks to restore his strength. The next day, Yatori escorts Major Taekk and a trade convoy to a nearby town. Kanna, helping push a cart, is surprised when Ikta emerges from inside; he obtains sugarcane from a local and brings her to the town fountain. There, Ikta recalls finding wind and fire spirits locked in the dark prison separated from their owners—a strict taboo under the Church of Alderamin—and compares the Alderan religion with Shinak beliefs. Meanwhile, Taekk tells Yatori to relax, though she stands guard outside instead as he and his aides enter to meet local leaders, only to find the representatives murdered before being ambushed and killed themselves. Yatori fights off the attackers and leads a cavalry pursuit toward the Alafatra Mountains, halting when she spots an ambush. Shinak leader Nanak Dar declares a holy war against Katjvarna over years of abuse and the forced separation from their spirits, which they call "Hahashiku." Back at the garrison, Safida hides the events from Central and organizes a punitive force to wipe out the Shinak, prompting Deinkun to protest the war against fellow citizens as dishonorable. Hearing Yatori's report, Ikta questions why the Shinak invoked a "holy war," a concept that should have been alien due to their beliefs. The next day, Chamille is sent to the rear as the garrison mobilizes; Torway's unit receives new air-rifles derived from Anarai's Box and Ikta's designs, while Kanna's company faces a brutal uphill battle against the Shinak.
8	"Some Day, for the Third Time"; Transliteration: "Itsuka san-dome ni" (Japanese: いつか三度目に)	Tomohiro Furukawa	Shinsuke Ōnishi	Tomohiro Furukawa	August 27, 2016	
On a supply mission, Ikta and his second-in-command, Suuya, converse before delivering jackets and gloves for high-altitude combat to a medical camp overwhelmed with casualties. At a strategy meeting, the Imperial Knights are ordered to march to a base closer to the front lines to continue ferrying supplies. Meanwhile, Kanna's platoon takes up post in an abandoned fortress and is left to hold it while the army continues advancing. After a long day at the field hospital, Ikta invites Haroma to dinner, only for alarms to signal an enemy attack. Taking command of the training platoons, Ikta forms a defensive line before the headquarters and hospital tents: his illumination platoon blinds the charging foes, Matthew and Torway's riflemen cut them down, and Yatori finishes them with a cavalry charge. Elsewhere, Kanna shares her backstory with a fellow infantryman before an alarm reveals their fortress is surrounded. Marching under a new superior on another supply run, the Imperial Knights spot a Shinak-held fort. To avoid an undesirable reconnaissance in force, Ikta promises to retake it in under an hour; Torway's new air rifles disable the Shinak air mortars and provide covering fire while Ikta and Matthew's platoons charge in and capture the fort. Afterward, an injured messenger reports that his besieged fortress needs immediate reinforcement before collapsing. Ikta leads the training platoons to assist but rests two days to prevent altitude sickness; by the time they arrive, the fortress is empty save for the corpses of Kanna's platoon and the Shinak.
9	"The Fate of a Small Reputation"; Transliteration: "Sasayakana menboku no yukue" (Japanese: ささやかな面目の行方)	Masaki Matsumura	Shinsuke Ōnishi	Masaki Matsumura	September 2, 2016	
Arriving at their next supply point, the training platoons meet Sazaruf—now promoted from First Lieutenant to Captain due to high officer casualties—who informs them they are at the front lines. After briefing the Imperial Knights, he assigns them to "light bonfires," sending the platoons to burn Shinak villages and relocate the residents to a temporary camp. While Ikta assigns tents, a Shinak boy screams and bites his clothes; Ikta flicks him to break free, accidentally giving him a nosebleed. Enraged, Deinkun punches Ikta in the face before tending to the boy and punching his own nose to match, calling him a brave young warrior. Stopping a furious Suuya who came to check on him, Ikta thanks Deinkun for establishing himself as someone the Shinak can trust and asks him to handle tent assignments in his place. Later, the forces that survived the Alafatra march gather for a speech from Safida. Over dinner, the Imperial Knights discuss how the punitive force had lost over half its force in transit; after Yatori and Haroma leave, Matthew asks Ikta and Torway how they deal with their urges, with Sazaruf joining in. The next day, as the force marches through a ravine, Ikta suggests raising shields toward the slopes incase of an ambush from above. When Shinak warriors rush down, Deinkun saves Ikta while he protects Haroma, fighting beside him. Nanak charges down to kill Safida and duels Yatori, who is guarding him, losing the duel and her spirit, Hisha, but escapes when unknown assailants fatally wound Deinkun and draw Yatori away. As the Imperial Knights gather around him, Deinkun asks Yatori with his final words if he was an honorable knight. Meanwhile, Nanak returns to find her village ablaze.
10	"La Saia Alderamin"; Transliteration: "Ra saia aruderamin" (Japanese: ラ • サイア • アルデラミン)	Mitsutaka Noshitani	Shōgo Yasukawa	Masayuki Kojima	September 9, 2016	
After a flashback of young Ikta and Nanak playing at night, Nanak rushes into her village to find her grandparents dead and Imperial soldiers inside; she kills one before her blade gets stuck and she is captured. Arriving to find Imperial troops pillaging the settlement, Ikta and Yatori interrupt soldiers about to assault Nanak, order them out, and free her. The next day, an inspector from Holy Aldera discovers widespread religious taboos and leaves to report them. Ordered by Safida to intercept him, Sazaruf and the Imperial Knights instead discover a 12,000-strong army from La Saia Alderamin invading. At a strategy meeting, the officers decide the main force will retreat while a 600-man battalion delays the invaders. Meeting with Nanak, Ikta reveals himself as her childhood friend and severs his pinky into three pieces in a traditional Shinak apology, asking that she accept his apology for the army's atrocities, help repel the Alderan army threatening both their peoples, and let him continue calling her Nana. Ikta and Yatori are promoted to First Lieutenants and Torway, Matthew, and Haroma to Second Lieutenants; Matthew and Haroma refuse Ikta and Yatori's urging to retreat with the main army, choosing instead to stay and fight alongside them. The detachment creates a fire wall, lighting the Great Forest of Gagal Kasakan ablaze, halting the Alderan advance. While Haroma treats Ikta's finger and urges him not to carry every burden alone, Yatori reports the Alderan army has set counter-fires to burn out the forest and wall sooner and shares rumors of a Kiokan exchange officer known as the "Sleepless Officer". Kiokan Major Jean Arkinex and First Lieutenant Miara Gin discuss the caliber of the Imperial commander delaying them.
11	"Lazy vs. Unsleeping"; Transliteration: "Jōtai VS fumin" (Japanese: 常怠VS不眠)	Shūhei Yabuta	Shōgo Yasukawa	Morio Asaka	September 16, 2016	
While Jean and Miara discuss strategy, Princess Chamille receives word of the La Saia Alderamin invasion. The Imperial Knights, Sazaruf, and Nanak plan to draw the Alderamin army into battle so it does not detour around the fire wall. When enemy officers learn a section of the fire is dying down, the Imperial detachment fortifies its pocket. As the Alderamin vanguard attacks, Ikta's platoon illuminates them while Torway and Matthew's rifle platoons open fire. When enemy soldiers bring forward stakes to block bullets, Yatori and Nanak's forces rush out to dismantle the defenses; caught up in the fight, Nanak's warriors overextend and take heavy casualties from a Kiokan air-rifle volley. With a fresh wave of infantry advancing, Ikta commits his platoon to cover their retreat back inside, setting the barrier alight to restore the fire wall once everyone clears the gate. At the field hospital, Haroma treats the wounded while Suuya is overwhelmed by the training platoons' first fatalities. Reporting the losses to Ikta, she rages at his unemotional response until he points out she is really angry about saving the Shinak they had been fighting just the day prior. After an emotional talk with Yatori, Suuya runs off, and Yatori confesses that if ordered to kill Ikta, she would comply only by destroying herself as Yatori first. Meanwhile, a Kiokan special forces unit behind enemy lines receives orders from Jean.
12	"Ghost Hunter"; Transliteration: "Bōrei o karu mono" (Japanese: 亡霊を狩るもの)	Kunio Wakabayashi	Shōgo Yasukawa	Minoru Ōhara	September 23, 2016	
After Safida and his staff complete their retreat to the rear, Princess Chamille bursts in and informs him he is being court-martialed. Meanwhile, the Imperial Knights and Sazaruf hold a strategy meeting as Jean receives intelligence from his unit behind enemy lines. Visiting the dead, Suuya is initially angered to see Nanak leaving the tent until she realizes Nanak left white flowers for their fallen comrades according to Shinak custom. When a messenger reports the Aldera army is on the move, Sazaruf volunteers to hold the fortifications along the side route, admitting Ikta should remain in overall command; Torway's platoon follows to support him. Haroma and Matthew spot a Kiokan hot air balloon from which Jean records the size of the force sent to the side route, while Ikta briefs his troops on maintaining the dying fire wall. In his command tent, Ikta receives a confusing report of 300 Kiokan cavalrymen riding in circles around burning trees. At the side route, Torway asks Sazaruf for permission to act independently—which Sazaruf grants upon realizing it is Ikta's order—allowing Torway's platoon to ambush and wipe out the Kiokan special forces on an overlooking cliff before the remaining Kiokans besiege Sazaruf's position. Overlooking the fire wall, Ikta and Yatori share a meal back-to-back as Ikta promises never to abandon her. The next day, Jean deploys six unprecedentedly large blast cannons delivered by wagon, obliterating an Imperial detachment's defenses beyond the fire wall before Kiokan cavalry cuts through to wipe out the survivors. Ikta realizes the balloon surveyed the terrain so the cavalry could practice crossing the fire wall as Jean leads 300 air-rifle cavalry toward his command post.
13	"In a Twilight Empire"; Transliteration: "Tasogare no teikoku nite" (Japanese: たそがれの帝国にて)	Masaki Matsumura; Tetsuo Ichimura	Shōgo Yasukawa	Masaki Matsumura; Yoshiaki Kawajiri; Tetsuo Ichimura	September 30, 2016	
Leaving Haroma and Matthew to command, Ikta departs with Yatori, Nanak, and a platoon to intercept the Kiokan strike group at an abandoned work station. Arriving at night, Jean spots Imperial infantry behind defenses with flammable materials scattered ahead and smells oil. Deducing a fire trap against a charge, he halts the assault and orders riders to line up for volley fire, realizing he has been deceived only as the oil scent fades. Ikta's troops emerge from concealed underground positions, blinding the horses with light and stabbing horses and riders in the chaos. Yatori's cavalry disrupts reorganizing soldiers before raising a flag meaning "open to negotiate"; infuriated by the disorderly fight, Jean agrees to a ceasefire. Rejecting Jean's demand to surrender, Ikta shines Kusu's light on Jean's chest, claiming air-rifle marksmen will shoot on his command, and demands a withdrawal across the fire wall; unwilling to risk his larger ambitions, Jean agrees to pull back. Marching toward the rear—where the rest of the delaying force has already retreated—Ikta's group is ambushed by the sole surviving Kiokan special forces commander, whom Yatori defeats in a duel. At the rear, Chamille rushes to hug Ikta. Following a military tribunal, Safida is stripped of his rank and honors, his family's wealth is seized to compensate fallen soldiers' families, and he is sentenced to death. In a private audience, Chamille reveals she wants Ikta to rise to command Katjvarna's military and lead the nation into a controlled defeat so it preserves sovereignty while adopting Kiokan innovation and democracy to revive the decaying empire. Afterwards, Ikta and Yatori sit back-to-back and share a conversation.

== Reception ==
In 2014, the light novels ranked at number ten on the Kono Light Novel ga Sugoi! list of top 10 light novels.

The anime series has received generally positive reviews.The anime series has received generally positive reviews. (Note: It holds a score of 7.62 out of 10 on MyAnimeList.)

== See also ==
- Reign of the Seven Spellblades — Another light novel series by the same author.
- That Time I Got Reincarnated as a Slime - Another light novel whose manga adaptation was illustrated by Taiki Kawakami,
