= Beyond the Boundary: I'll Be Here =

2015 two-part Japanese animated film by Taichi Ishidate

- Kanji: 劇場版 境界の彼方 -I'LL BE HERE-
- Revised Hepburn: Gekijōban Kyōkai no Kanata: I'll Be Here
- Directed by: Taichi Ishidate
- Screenplay by: Jukki Hanada
- Based on: Beyond the Boundary by Nagomu Torii
- Produced by: Nagaharu Ohashi; Shinichi Nakamura; Shigeru Saitō; Gō Tanaka
- Starring: Risa Taneda; Kenn; Minori Chihara; Tatsuhisa Suzuki; Ayako Kawasumi; Masaya Matsukaze; Akeno Watanabe; Naomi Shindō; Yuri Yamaoka; Moe Toyota
- Cinematography: Ryūta Nakagami
- Edited by: Kengo Shigemura
- Music by: Hikaru Nanase
- Production company: Kyoto Animation
- Distributed by: Shochiku
- Release dates: March 14, 2015 (Past); April 25, 2015 (Future)
- Running time: Total (2 films): 175 minutes
- Country: Japan
- Language: Japanese
- Box office: Total (2 films): US$2.89 million

Beyond the Boundary: I'll Be Here (Note: Japanese: 劇場版 境界の彼方 -I'LL BE HERE-, Hepburn: Gekijōban Kyōkai no Kanata: I'll Be Here; lit. 'Beyond the Boundary: The Movie – I'll Be Here') is a 2015 two-part Japanese animated film based on the light novel series Beyond the Boundary by Nagomu Torii, consisting of Beyond the Boundary: I'll Be Here – Past (Note: Japanese: 劇場版 境界の彼方 -I'LL BE HERE- 過去篇, Hepburn: Gekijōban Kyōkai no Kanata: I'll Be Here – Kako-hen) and Beyond the Boundary: I'll Be Here – Future. (Note: Japanese: 劇場版 境界の彼方 -I'LL BE HERE- 未来篇, Hepburn: Gekijōban Kyōkai no Kanata: I'll Be Here – Mirai-hen) Produced by Kyoto Animation and distributed by Shochiku, both films are directed by Taichi Ishidate from a script written by Jukki Hanada. The first film serves as a recap of the 2013 anime television series adaptation and the second film takes place one year after the events of the series.

Originally conceived as an anime series, the project as a film was revealed in July 2014. The film being split into two parts was confirmed in November 2014, along with the announcement of their staff and cast. Additional staff and cast for the films were revealed in February 2015.

Beyond the Boundary: I'll Be Here – Past and Beyond the Boundary: I'll Be Here – Future were released in Japan on March 14 and April 25, 2015, respectively. Both films collectively grossed over $2 million worldwide.

== Plot ==
=== Past ===
The head of the Nase household in Nagatsuki City, Izumi, contacts Mirai Kuriyama, a member of the clan that has cursed blood, and gives her a mission to kill Akihito Kanbara, an immortal half-yōmu. On his way home, Akihito notices Mirai on the school building's rooftop and rushes in to save her from taking "suicide", only for Mirai to stab him with a sword formed out of her blood. This meeting leads to Mirai attempting to kill Akihito on multiple occasions and to both of them getting acquainted. Meanwhile, Miroku Fujima of the Spirit World Warriors' Observation Department meets up with Izumi to inform her about the yōmu called the Hollow Shadow. At a cliff, Akihito gets possessed by the Hollow Shadow and pleads with Mirai to inject him with her blood. After Mirai forced out the Hollow Shadow and destroyed it, Hiroomi Nase, Shizuku Ninomiya, and Ayaka Shindō contain the weakened Akihito as his yōmu side is about to surface. The three fail to stop a transformed Akihito, but Mirai manages to pacify his yōmu and bring him back to his senses. During a lantern festival, Mirai tells Izumi that she has decided to not kill Akihito while staying true to her mission.

After leaving behind Akihito, Mirai, and her brother Hiroomi, Mitsuki meets Miroku, who then explains that the coming Calm, a phenomenon when all yōmu become weak, is caused by a yōmu called Beyond the Boundary. Hiroomi shows up and engages in a fight with Miroku before the latter escapes. During the Calm, Akihito and his yōmu-half become weak, with the latter manifesting. The transformed Akihito briefly fights with Izumi before escaping. Izumi tells Mirai that her blood can extract Akihito's yōmu from his body to save him but at the cost of her life and gives his location. Mirai finds the transformed Akihito in a forest and engages in a fight with him until she manages to incapacitate him. Akihito wakes up inside his apartment and finds Mirai taking care of him. Sometime later inside the Literature Club's room, Mirai reveals that he is dreaming since his "wake" and that her existence is due to a portion of her blood inside his body as she no longer exists in the real world before saying goodbye with a kiss. Akihito wakes up in a hospital room and learns that he has been unconscious for three months since his last encounter with Mirai.

Mirai is seen in the world of Beyond the Boundary along with a mindless puppet Akihito and later engages in a battle with the yōmu. Meanwhile, Akihito hears noises coming from the sky, with Ayaka explaining that it is his yōmu-half, Beyond the Boundary, that once inhabited his body. Akihito reads the last text message from Mirai and breaks down in tears. Sometime later at night, Hiroomi, Mitsuki, Shizuku, and Sakura Inami witness multiple yōmu getting absorbed by a black sphere in the sky and encounter Akihito going to the Literature Club room. The group then meets Yayoi, Akihito's mother, who reveals that Mirai is alive. With the help of his yōmu stone that was dislodged from him during the Hollow Shadow incident, Akihito fuses with a piece of the Beyond the Boundary and his puppet in its world. He then reunites with Mirai, who both then plan to defeat Beyond the Boundary.

Mirai eventually reaches Beyond the Boundary's core with Akihito's help and destroys it with her sword. The two then find themselves surrounded by Akihito's bad memories. As they calm down, the two are surrounded by multiple yōmu, which they kill. Akihito then defeats Beyond the Boundary, who takes the form of himself, and absorbs it back into himself. After patting her head and saying his gratitude, Akihito finds Mirai slowly disappearing due to the defeat of Beyond the Boundary. He then leaps off from the crumbling world of Beyond the Boundary to save the ring that she has left behind. Sometime later after the incident, Akihito senses Mirai on the school building's rooftop and confesses his love to her as he gives her red-framed eyeglasses. In a post-credits scene, Mirai wears the eyeglasses but suddenly recalls the memories of her mother and her time with Akihito as they begin to fade away. Afterward, she questions her and Akihito's identities.

=== Future ===
A year after the Beyond the Boundary incident, Akihito and Mitsuki are now third-year students, Hiroomi has graduated and taken over the Nase clan following the disappearance of Izumi, and Mirai is now a second-year student that has an amnesia. Akihito decides to hide the truth about Mirai's identity to free her from her miserable past. Sakura and Ai Shindō invite Mirai to join tennis, but the latter wants to join the Literature Club. Meanwhile, Hiroomi and Shizuku fight humanoid black goos, but the latter retreats. Mirai and Sakura head home from school when they encounter the black goo and a mysterious hooded figure, who telepathically asks Mirai if she wants to know about her identity. Akihito and Hiroomi arrive to save the girls, followed by Mitsuki. Mirai then insists Mitsuki and Akihito tell her about her identity, but Hiroomi and Mitsuki cover up for Akihito. Later at night, Mirai finds the blood on her hand sizzling near her ring.

Mirai joins the Literature Club as its vice president upon the invitation from Mitsuki, who wants to protect her. Sakura and Mitsuki approach Akihito and tell him that Mirai still has a lingering feeling related to him. Akihito and Mirai then go to dinner together. Afterward, Mirai begs Akihito to tell her the truth about herself and her relationship with him and reveals that she has figured out her ability to form a sword with her blood. Suddenly, the hooded figure attacks them. Mirai instinctively protects a wounded Akihito and her blood causes the mysterious figure's hood to be melted, revealing its identity as Izumi. Izumi then restores some of Mirai's memories, during which Hiroomi arrives and plants a tracking spell on his older sister before the latter runs away.

In his apartment, Akihito is visited by his mother Yayoi. Yayoi tells him that she and Hiroomi will be dealing with Izumi. In her apartment, Mirai is visited by Akihito but becomes worried when she receives a phone call from Akihito. The fake Akihito reveals to be Miroku who is responsible for Izumi being possessed and injects Mirai with a yōmu capable of bringing out the darkness within her. Mirai then remembers the fate of her clan and Akihito possessing Beyond the Boundary. Akihito arrives and finds himself being attacked by a possessed Mirai. Mitsuki and Shizuku stop Mirai, with Shizuku setting the track to an escaping goo to lead them to the castigator behind the recent attacks. Meanwhile, Hiroomi and Ayaka arrive at a forest to deal with Izumi, but Ayaka teleports Hiroomi away to assist Akihito and prepares to fight Izumi.

Akihito, Mitsuki, and Shizuku reach an abandoned building, where they learn from archived footage that Miroku is already dead and Izumi is his vassal as a result of them getting injected by the same yōmu in the past. Mirai arrives and attempts to kill Akihito, but Hiroomi stops her. Suddenly, a defeated Ayaka in her yōmu form is thrown into the building by Izumi, who is later incapacitated by Hiroomi. Akihito allows himself to be stabbed by Mirai, during which he is transported to her subconscious and learns about her past. He manages to take her out of her misery and helps her to come to terms with it. Before returning to the real world, both of them promise that they are going to stay with each other forever. Meanwhile, Yayoi is present with the group and reveals herself to be the gatekeeper between the worlds of humans and yōmu. They later reunite with Akihito and Mirai, and their lives return to normal following the incident. In a post-credits scene, Akihito and Mirai say "I love you" to each other.

== Voice cast ==
The table shows the Japanese voice cast (green-colored cells) and the English dub cast (white-colored cells) of the two Beyond the Boundary: I'll Be Here films.

Character	Past	Future
Mirai Kuriyama	Risa Taneda	Risa Taneda
Mirai Kuriyama	Kira Vincent-Davis	Kira Vincent-Davis
Akihito Kanbara	Kenn Mei Tanaka (young)	Kenn Mei Tanaka (young)
Akihito Kanbara	Clint Bickham	Clint Bickham
Mitsuki Nase	Minori Chihara	Minori Chihara
Mitsuki Nase	Monica Rial	Monica Rial
Hiroomi Nase	Tatsuhisa Suzuki	Tatsuhisa Suzuki
Hiroomi Nase	Adam Gibbs	Adam Gibbs
Izumi Nase	Ayako Kawasumi	Ayako Kawasumi
Izumi Nase	Carli Mosier	Carli Mosier
Miroku Fujima	Masaya Matsukaze	Masaya Matsukaze
Miroku Fujima	Houston Hayes	Houston Hayes
Shizuku Ninomiya	Akeno Watanabe	Akeno Watanabe
Shizuku Ninomiya	Joanne Bonasso	Joanne Bonasso
Ayaka Shindō	Naomi Shindō	Naomi Shindō
Ayaka Shindō	Molly Searcy	Molly Searcy
Ai Shindō	Yuri Yamaoka	Yuri Yamaoka
Ai Shindō	Brittney Karbowski	Brittney Karbowski
Sakura Inami	Moe Toyota	Moe Toyota
Sakura Inami	Caitlynn French	Caitlynn French
Yayoi Kanbara	Hiromi Konno	Hiromi Konno
Yayoi Kanbara	Luci Christian	Luci Christian
Grandfather Nase	Ikuya Sawaki	
Grandfather Nase	John Swasey	
Mirai's mother		Emi Shinohara
Mirai's ancestor		Yoko Hikasa
Nase household servant		Michiko Kaiden
Spirit world warrior		Seiichiro Yamashita
Spirit world warrior		Masayoshi Sugawara

== Production ==
In July 2014, Kyoto Animation updated the website of the 2013 anime television series Beyond the Boundary to reveal an anime film for the series. The project was originally planned to be produced as an anime series, but the enthusiasm of the staff had led the change of its format into a film. Director Taichi Ishidate stated:

After the last episode, I was burnt out in my own way (laughs), but I was told, "There are more things you want to say and do". Everyone on the staff had worked so hard that it would have been a waste if it were only on TV, and I had put my own various messages and feelings into the production, so we all thought that we could make a movie version that would be enjoyed by a wider audience.

In November 2014, the full title was announced as Beyond the Boundary: The Movie – I'll Be Here (劇場版 境界の彼方 -I'LL BE HERE-, Gekijōban Kyōkai no Kanata: I'll Be Here) and the film was revealed to be split into two parts, subtitled Past (過去篇, Kako-hen) and Future (未来篇, Mirai-hen). Past would center on Mirai Kuriyama as it retells the events depicted in the anime series and Future was described as a "brand-new work" taking place one year after the events of the series. The staff working on the films at Kyoto Animation were also announced, including Ishidate as the director, Jukki Hanada as the screenwriter, and Miku Kadowaki as the character designer. Risa Taneda, Kenn, Minori Chihara, and Tatsuhisa Suzuki were set to reprise their roles from the anime series.

Additional staff were revealed in February 2015, including Mikiko Watanabe as the art director, Kana Miyata as the color designer, and Ryūta Nakagami as the cinematographer. The returning cast were also revealed, including Ayako Kawasumi, Masaya Matsukaze, Akeno Watanabe, Naomi Shindō, Yuri Yamaoka, and Moe Toyota. In March 2015, Taneda confirmed that all the lines in Past were re-recorded despite it being a compilation film. Additionally, Watanabe was revealed to be solely voicing Beyond the Boundary in Past, which was previously voiced by all the cast in the anime series.

In September 2015, Sentai Filmworks revealed Krystal LaPorte as the English dub actress for Kuriyama, followed by the full cast that month. However, LaPorte revealed in her Twitter account in August 2016 that she was fired and banned by Sentai in February without an explanation. Following the licensing of the films by Sentai in March 2017, Kira Vincent-Davis has replaced LaPorte as the voice actress for Kuriyama.

== Music ==
In February 2015, Hikaru Nanase was revealed to be composing the two Beyond the Boundary: I'll Be Here films. Chihara was also revealed to be performing the theme song for the second film, Future, titled "I Wanted to Meet the Sky" (会いたかった空, Aitakatta Sora). It was released as a single in Japan on April 22, 2015. The original soundtrack for the films was released in Japan on May 20, 2015, which includes the image song performed by Annabel for the first film, Past, titled "Your Smile That Tells the World" (あなたの笑顔という世界, Anata no Egao to Iu Sekai).

Beyond the Boundary: I'll Be Here – Original Sound Track [Disc 1]
No.	Title	Length
1.	"The First Red Thread"	1:59
2.	"Beginning of the Story"	0:37
3.	"That Nase Household"	2:35
4.	"Mirai Doesn't Stand Out"	0:59
5.	"In the Middle of Confusion"	0:55
6.	"Sad and Painful Decision"	1:44
7.	"Demonification of the Half-Demon"	1:21
8.	"Confrontation with an Inescapable Fate"	1:01
9.	"Quiet Determination"	0:35
10.	"The Arrival of Calm"	1:09
11.	"Asking Suspicious Questions"	1:13
12.	"Nightmare Space"	1:13
13.	"Circulating Kindness"	1:43
14.	"Gloominess of the Nase Household"	1:32
15.	"The Hesitation of the Decision"	0:45
16.	"Because of Love"	1:28
17.	"Empty Gathering"	1:51
18.	"Friendship Without Reality"	0:59
19.	"Telling the Truth"	2:22
20.	"White World"	1:11
21.	"A Battle for One Person Only"	0:58
22.	"Justice of the Nase Household"	1:26
23.	"The Magnitude of What Was Lost"	1:05
24.	"A Not Unpleasant Mail"	2:18
25.	"Prologue of the Battle"	0:56
26.	"The Secret Beyond the Boundary"	1:03
27.	"The Final Strategy Begins"	1:35
28.	"Continuing Charge"	1:13
29.	"Facing Mirai"	0:54
30.	"Two People Becoming Heroic"	1:08
31.	"Mirai Crumbles and Disappears"	2:38
32.	"Everyday Life Recovered"	4:21
33.	"Memories of Mirai"	1:26
34.	"Your Smile That Tells the World"	5:00
Total length:		53:13

All music is composed by Nanase, except where indicated.

Beyond the Boundary: I'll Be Here – Original Sound Track [Disc 2]
No.	Title	Music	Length
1.	"New Prologue"		2:19
2.	"Telling the Whole Story"		2:34
3.	"As a Result of the Present"		1:23
4.	"Pale Everyday Life"		1:45
5.	"A Heart That Doesn't Overlap"		0:53
6.	"An Unknown Threat"		0:53
7.	"A Sign of Darkness Getting Closer"		1:04
8.	"Mirai Seeking the Truth"		2:12
9.	"Swaying an Unhappy Heart"		0:49
10.	"Time to Decide"		0:58
11.	"Decision and Resolution"		1:32
12.	"Wavering Worries"		1:18
13.	"Two People Looking For the Way"		1:47
14.	"Distance of the Approaching Heart"		1:24
15.	"Mirai's Hesitation"		2:06
16.	"Tough Core"		1:41
17.	"Looming"		1:05
18.	"A Shocking Situation"		1:17
19.	"Time to Go Back"		1:28
20.	"Parent-and-Child Time"		1:13
21.	"A Trembling Threat"		2:19
22.	"Forced to Go Off Track"		1:09
23.	"Mirai's Transformation"		0:58
24.	"Invoking a Cataclysm"		1:56
25.	"Confrontational Woman"		0:30
26.	"Sinister Truth"		2:45
27.	"Mirai Mixture"		1:03
28.	"Untold Feelings and Battle"		1:27
29.	"A Battle That Becomes Tragic"		2:13
30.	"Family Tragedy"		3:24
31.	"Mirai Saved"		1:40
32.	"The Plain Truth"		2:06
33.	"A New Story of Two People"		1:44
34.	"The Two People Thereafter"		0:32
35.	"I Wanted to Meet the Sky (Short Size)"	Daisuke Kikuta	4:18
Total length:			57:45

== Marketing ==
A teaser key visual and trailer for the two Beyond the Boundary: I'll Be Here films were released on November 29, 2014. The films received a new key visual and trailer on February 14, 2015. A key visual solely for the second film, Future, was revealed in March 2015. Kintetsu Railway, the Kashihara City Tourism Association in Kashihara, Nara Prefecture, and the karaoke Joysound have made collaborations with the films.

== Release ==
=== Theatrical ===
The two Beyond the Boundary: I'll Be Here films were released in Japan in 2015: Past on March 14 and Future on April 25. In light of the arson attack at Kyoto Animation, Shochiku held a special screening for the films produced by the studio "to create an opportunity for people to be able to watch... works... by Kyoto Animation on the big screen"; Past and Future were screened at Shinjuku Piccadilly Cinema in Tokyo in August 2019 and at Movix in Kyoto in September.

=== Home media ===
The two Beyond the Boundary: I'll Be Here films were released on Blu-ray and DVD in Japan in 2015: Past on September 18 and Future on October 7. The Blu-ray and DVD of Past was originally planned to be available at theaters on its release without being sold to the general public. Sentai released the films on Blu-ray and DVD combo pack on August 22, 2017. Animatsu Entertainment released the films as a bundle on Blu-ray and DVD in the United Kingdom on October 2, 2017; it was previously scheduled to be released in March. Manga Entertainment released the films as a bundle on Blu-ray and DVD in the United Kingdom on October 16, 2017. Hidive added the films for streaming on November 20, 2017. Hanabee Entertainment released the films as a bundle on Blu-ray and DVD in Australia and New Zealand on April 12, 2018.

== Reception ==
=== Box office ===
The two Beyond the Boundary: I'll Be Here films grossed a total of US$2.89 million worldwide. The first film, Past, grossed ¥140 million (US$1.16 million) at the Japanese box office. The second film, Future, grossed ¥203 million (US$1.68 million) in Japan and US$53,179 in South Korea, for a total of US$1.73 million. In the first two days since its release, Future debuted ninth place at the Japanese box office after earning ¥47 million (US$384,919).

=== Critical response ===
In his review of the second film, Richard Eisenbeis at Kotaku stated that Beyond the Boundary: I'll Be Here – Future was "a solid end to Beyond the Boundary. While the series itself had a good ending in its own right, the movie goes that one extra step to explain the series' remaining mysteries and give our heroes one final obstacle to overcome before they get the happy ending they so richly deserve." Eisenbeis lauded the film for how it effectively used the theme of amnesia in the plot, how the "run-of-the-mill forgettable... villain" was being used as a guide to give light to the pseudo-antagonists of the anime series, how the other characters had backstories that "[m]ost are well done", and the action sequences involving the "awesome-looking" blood bending. However, he felt the film "starts to seem a bit over connected" and its deus ex machina–the Beyond the Boundary itself–was "both a bit predictable and cheap".

Paul Jensen of Anime News Network felt the two Beyond the Boundary: I'll Be Here films were "a mixed bag. The first is a poor replacement for the TV series, so I'm almost tempted to classify it as an on-disc extra instead of as a self-contained piece of entertainment. The second movie does a much better job of fulfilling its purpose as an updated and improved conclusion to the story." Jensen praised Kyoto Animation for the films' visual presentation "from subtle body language to frantic action scenes". However, he criticized the first film, Past, for squeezing "three hundred minutes' worth of plot into around ninety" and its "rushed" pacing, but he felt that it did "at least make a reasonable decision to focus as narrowly on the main characters as possible", and Future for having "the same problem as the TV series[, which it] was always entertaining and even poignant in the moment, but it didn't really stick with me after the credits rolled." Ian Wolf of Anime UK News gave the films a score of 5 out of 10, describing them as "mediocre films for an equally mediocre show." Wolf felt that they were "even less good than [the mixed-bag Beyond the Boundary]" and the plot of Future was "not that exciting,... sometimes confusing, and you feel yourself drifting off at numerous points." However, he praised Future for its artwork and humor.
