= List of Beyond the Boundary episodes =

Beyond the Boundary
- Cover of the second Blu-ray volume released by Pony Canyon in Japan on February 5, 2014.
- No. of episodes: 12 + 1 OVA + 5 ONA

Release
- Original network: Tokyo MX
- Original release: October 2 – December 18, 2013

Beyond the Boundary is a 2013 supernatural Japanese anime series based on the light novels written by Nagomu Torii and illustrated by Chise Kamoi. One day high-school student Akihito Kanbara instinctively goes to save his fellow schoolmate, Mirai Kuriyama who he thinks is committing suicide. However Mirai stabs Akihito with a sword made of her own blood and discovers that Akihito is an immortal "half-youmu"—the offspring of a supernatural creature called a youmu and a human. After learning that Mirai is a Spirit World Warrior and lacks the confidence to slay youmu, the two form an unlikely pair when Akihito decides to help her regain her confidence to kill youmu so that she may stop attempting to kill him as practice.

The twelve episode anime was produced by Kyoto Animation, directed by Taichi Ishidate and written by Jukki Hanada, with character designs by Miku Kadowaki, art direction by Mikiko Watanabe, sound direction by Yota Tsuruoka and soundtrack music by Hikaru Nanase. The series premiered on Tokyo MX between October 2 and December 18, 2013, and later aired on ABC, TVA, BS11 and Animax along with online streaming on TBS On Demand and Niconico. Crunchyroll simulcasted the series with English subtitles in North America. An original video animation episode was later released on July 2, 2014. Pony Canyon released the series in Japan on seven Blu-ray and DVD volumes between January 8 and July 2, 2014. The anime was licensed by Sentai Filmworks in North America and was dubbed and produced by Sentai Studios in Houston, Texas. Hanabee Entertainment later licensed the series for a digital release in Australia.

An original net animation titled Beyond the Boundary Idol Trial! was released on YouTube between November 18 and December 16, 2013. The mini-series follows super deformed versions of Mitsuki, Mirai, Sakura, and Ai as they put wrong-doers on trial and sentence them following an idol stage performance.

The opening theme is "Beyond the Boundary" (境界の彼方; "Kyōkai no Kanata") by Minori Chihara and ending theme is "Daisy" by Stereo Dive Foundation. "Yakusoku no Kizuna" (約束の絆; "Bonds of Promises") performed by the Yomu Tobatsutai (Mirai Kuriyama (Risa Taneda), Mitsuki Nase (Minori Chihara) and Ai Shindō (Yuri Yamaoka)) is used as the Insert Song of episode six. The ending theme of the ONA is "Popī no Kaeri Michi" (ポピーの帰り道, "The Road Home Filled With Poppies") by Ai Shindō (Yuri Yamaoka), while "Judgment Ja!" (Judgmentじゃ!) performed by Ai Shindō and the Jury Dancers (Ai Shindō (Yuri Yamaoka), Mirai Kuriyama (Risa Taneda), Mitsuki Nase (Minori Chihara) and Sakura Inami (Moe Toyota)) is used as the insert song for all ONA episodes

== Episode list ==
| No. | Official English title (Note: All English titles are taken from Hanabee Entertainment.) Original Japanese title | Episode director | Animation director | Original air date (Note: As Beyond the Boundary premiered in Tokyo MX's Wednesday 24:30 (00:30 JST) time slot, the episodes technically aired the days following the ones listed.) | Refs. |
|---|---|---|---|---|---|
| 1 | "Carmine"; Transliteration: "Kāmain" (Japanese: カーマイン) | Taichi Ishidate | Miku Kadowaki | October 2, 2013 | |
While contemplating suicide, second year high school student Akihito Kanbara notices freshman Mirai Kuriyama about to jump off of the school roof and tries to save her. Annoyed, Mirai impales Akihito with a sword. Later, Akihito and his friend Mitsuki Nase prepare an anthology for their Literary Club until Mirai interrupts. She admits to stalking Akihito all week in an attempt to kill him, but continuously failed due to Akihito's immortality as a half-youmu. When confronted by Mirai after school, Akihito learns that Mirai is the lone survivor after the Kuriyama clan was wiped out because of their powerful ability to create weapons from their own blood. A youmu suddenly crashes through the window, which famous Spirit World Warrior Shizuku Ninomiya quickly defeats. Mirai explains that she had been using Akihito as battle practice. Meanwhile, Shizuku kills the previous youmu and extracts a stone at its core. The next day, Akihito learns that a youmu had been haunting Mirai's home, and decides to help her kill it.
| 2 | "Ultramarine"; Transliteration: "Gunjō" (Japanese: 群青) | Yasuhiro Takemoto | Nao Naitō | October 9, 2013 | |
Mirai manages to kill the youmu, revealing an ultramarine stone at its core. As Akihito tends to her woundsm he invites her to join the Literary Club, which she declines before passing out. The next day, Akihito and Mirai take the youmu stone to an appraiser and meet the humanoid youmu Ai Shindō. At school, Akihito tries to gather information on the aggressiveness of the recent youmu attacks from Mitsuki's younger sister Hiroomi, to no avail. Afterward, Akihito visits Ai's elder sister Ayaka Shindō to get her to reveal the contents of a postcard from his mother Yayoi Kanbara, where she warns him of the Hollow Shadow, a powerful youmu without a physical body. Ayaka explains it effortlessly defeated five A-level Spirit Warriors and the recent low-level youmu were probably agitated by its proximity. Ayaka appraises Mirai's youmu stone and uses the money to treat Akihito to food while imploring him not to further involve himself in her affairs, revealing that she has killed someone.
| 3 | "Moonlight Purple"; Transliteration: "Mūnraito Pāpuru" (Japanese: ムーンライトパープル) | Noriyuki Kitanohara | Shoko Ikeda | October 16, 2013 | |
Mirai chases a low-level youmu, but finds herself unable to kill it. Mitsuki appears and kills it, offering Mirai its stone which she rejects. Meanwhile, an interrogation officer from the Spirit World Warriors' Observation Department, Miroku Fujima, meets with Izumi Nase to discuss the coming of the Shadow. At school, Akihito fruitlessly implores Mirai to visit the Literary Club. Mitsuki later has Akihito rendezvous with her at the train yard to disclose some sensitive information she obtained from Iori Ichinomiya. Mitsuki reveals that Mirai pursue the Shadow and that she was adopted by the Inami clan who lost their daughter at the hands of Mirai while confronting the youmu. As the Shadow enters Nagatsuki City, causing the moon to turn purple, Akihito tries to prevent Mirai from going after it. Mirai tells Akihito of her connection to the Inami clan and that she murdered her friend Yui Inami out of fear after the Hollow Shadow possessed her. Despite Akihito's pleas, Mirai forbids him from accompanying her. Spirit World Warriors in the area establish barriers to guide the Shadow out of the city. As the youmu in the area become increasingly malicious, Mirai arrives at the city limits and prepares to confront it. Sakura Inami attacks her as they both become engulfed and get thrown into a random part of the city by the Shadow. Akihito stops Sakura.
| 4 | "Bitter Orange"; Transliteration: "Daidai" (Japanese: 橙) | Yasuhiro Takemoto | Chiyoko Ueno | October 23, 2013 | |
Akihito and Mirai flee from Sakura down the labyrinth created by the Shadow. Arriving at an illusionary replication of the train yard, Mirai becomes ensnared by the Shadow as it mimics Yui, but Akihito returns Mirai to reality before the Shadow kills her. Revealing its main body, the Shadow attacks Mirai who injects its body with corrosive blood, destroying it. The weakened Shadow later possesses Akihito, whom Mirai injects with her blood, forcing the Shadow out of Akihito and allowing Mirai to destroy it. Hiroomi, Ayaka and Shizuku arrive and forbid Mirai from going to Akihito's aid, locking him in a cage. Ayaka explains that Akihito's youmu half awakened due to his human half's weakened state. Akihito undergoes a monstrous transformation and becomes violent. The trio try and fail to keep him contained until Mirai empathetically embraces him. Akihito reawakens and apologizes profusely for the destruction he caused, bringing Mirai to tears. After observing the struggle, Miroku reports back to the Society. In the epilogue, Izumi presents the Hollow Shadow's stone to an unknown man, and remarks that it should stall the Society for the time being.
| 5 | "Chartreuse Light"; Transliteration: "Moegi no Akari" (Japanese: 萌黄の灯) | Naoko Yamada | Nao Naitō | October 30, 2013 | |
After she finally joins the Literary Club, Mirai, Akihito, Mitsuki and Hiroomi visit the Nase mansion where hey encounter a departing Miroku. Izumi confiscates Mirai's Spirit World Warrior license for a month for disobeying orders and pursuing the Shadow. Mitsuki tries to get Mirai hired at her part-time job, also discussing the latter's change of heart to socialization and Akihito's relationship with the Nase clan. They notice a passerby possessed by a youmu and chase it. Mirai battles and kills the youmu as Shizuku arrives and treats them to barbecue as thanks. Mirai notices a poster for the annual Nagatsuki City Lantern Festival, which Mitsuki recalls being barred from attending due to her warrior duties. Ayaka hires Mirai at her shop, and Mirai and Mitsuki inform her of Akihito's depression following his youmu transformation. Mitsuki agrees to attend the festival with Mirai. There, they encounter a surprised Akihito and Hiroomi at the festival, and Mirai knowingly decrees that they no longer have to be alone. In the epilogue, Mirai encounters Izumi in the woods.
| 6 | "Shocking Pink"; Transliteration: "Shokkingu Pinku" (Japanese: ショッキングピンク) | Taiichi Ogawa | Nobuaki Maruki | November 6, 2013 | |
Mirai learns of a valuable fruit-type youmu lurking on their school roof. When she and Akihito confront it, it defends itself by drenching them in a noxious-smelling liquid. When Ai explains that the youmu gets easily distracted by human girls, Akihito and Mirai implore Mitsuki to help. The following day, Mirai flirts with the youmu while Mitsuki approaches from behind, but it attacks again. Hiroomi explains that the youmu is weak to a specific song, but this also fails when Mirai turns out to be a weak singer. The group spends the next week learning the words and choreography to the song, which they perform perfectly in front of the youmu, lowering its guard. When the performance ends, the group horrifically realizes they failed to assign someone to kill the youmu, at which point it explodes and covers the entire roof in its liquid.
| 7 | "Color of Clouds"; Transliteration: "Donshoku" (Japanese: 曇色) | Noriyuki Kitanohara | Shoko Ikeda | November 13, 2013 | |
Sakura recalls Yui's warning of the Shadow's power while hunting an amphibious youmu. The next day, Shizuku informs the Literary Club of Sakura's impending transfer to their school, though Mirai decides not to intervene. That evening, Sakura collapses while fighting a flying youmu, and Akihito takes her home to tend to her wounds. Sakura explains that her spear, given to her by a mysterious man, grows stronger by devouring youmu stones and that she may keep it for herself if she kills Mirai. Mirai unexpectedly arrives to return Akihito's phone, forcing him to reveal Sakura when Mirai panics upon noticing the second pair of shoes at his doorstep. The next day, Sakura successfully transfers despite Akihito's caution. Mirai and Sakura meet at a market alley to and begin their battle. Drawing Sakura into the sewers, Mirai explains her loss of interests in revenge and her intention to live for the sake of the Inami sisters. Sakura to loses her fighting resolve at which point the spear attempts to devour her before Mirai stops it. Sakura admits to losing sight of herself at the chime of Yui's bell necklace and reconciles with Mirai. Miroku collects the spear to retrieve the Shadow's stone. Izumi and Mitsuki witness a phenomenon called the Calm as it spreads through Nagatsuki City.
| 8 | "Calming Gold"; Transliteration: "Nagi Ōgon" (Japanese: 凪黄金) | Rika Ōta | Yukiko Horiguchi | November 20, 2013 | |
Yayoi warns Akihito of the coming of the Calm as the city starts feeling its effects. Ai and Ayaka explain that the Calm severely weakens youmu; Akihito could potentially lose his immortality. As the group heads home, Miroku intercepts Mitsuki and explains that the phenomenon she witnessed was part of a youmu known as the one Beyond the Boundary, and that he was sent to investigate the Nase family's plans and learned that Izumi saved Mirai from being killed by the Inami clan following Yui's death. Hiroomi intervenes and attacks Miroku, who escapes. Akihito awakens on a train following a flashback before Izumi puts him to sleep again. Ayaka watches over Akihito at her shop as he starts feeling the Calm's effects. The Calm begins at midnight and the Spirit World Warriors of the city start slaughtering any youmu in sight. As Hiroomi and Mitsuki look into the conflict between their clan and the Society, they learn of Akihito's state and notice a giant youmu while Sakura manages to convince Mirai to go to Akihito. Ayaka intercepts Miroku, who is trying to capture Akihito for the Society, outside her shop and attacks him in her youmu form. Before she becomes overpowered, Izumi stops Miroku's attack. As Mirai returns to the shop, Akihito's youmu half awakens.
| 9 | "Silver Bamboo"; Transliteration: "Ginchiku" (Japanese: 銀竹) | Eisaku Kawanami | Kayo Hikiyama | November 27, 2013 | |
Mirai discovers Akihito in his youmu form. Meanwhile, as Hiroomi and Mitsuki attack the giant youmu, Izumi battles Miroku who escapes when a nearby fireball distracts Izumi. Izumi returns to the shop and attacks Akihito in front of Mirai before he too manages to escape. Hiroomi and Mitsuki defeat the large shadow and rendezvous at Akihito's apartment with Izumi and Mirai. Mirai explains that the Calm weakened Akihito's human half, causing his youmu half to surface. As they track Akihito through the woods, Izumi suggests that Mirai can now kill Akihito. The following day, as Mitsuki and Hiroomi ponder Izumi's ulterior motive, the latter surmises that Mirai deliberately weakened Akihito's human half with her freezing barrier. Izumi warns him about the Society. Dissatisfied, Hiroomi tries to dissuade Mirai from killing Akihito and later enters the Nase family archives, where he discovers that Akihito's youmu half is the one Beyond the Boundary. AS Miroku manages to steal the Hollow Shadow's stone from the Nase vault, Mirai tracks Akihito to a deserted forest and battles him, eventually injuring him severely.
| 10 | "White World"; Transliteration: "Shiro no Sekai" (Japanese: 白の世界) | Yasuhiro Takemoto | Chiyoko Ueno | December 4, 2013 | |
In a flashback, Izumi summons Mirai to Nagatsuki City. In the present, Akihito awakens in his apartment and learns that Mirai has been caring for him following his youmu transformation. Mirai reveals that she exists via a portion of her blood within Akihito and they are in his dream after he fell unconscious during their battles. She explains that she was sent to Nagatsuki to kill Beyond the Boundary but cannot bring herself to harm Akihito, instead using her blood during the Calm to draw the youmu out of Akihito and into herself before vanishing. Mirai kisses Akihito, who awakens in shock. Another flashback reveals that Mirai had informed Izumi of her refusal to kill Akihito during the lantern festival. Izumi then used her freezing barrier to draw the youmu out of Akihito during the Calm and manipulated Mirai into believing she could save him by sacrificing herself to it, to which she agreed. Elsewhere, in the Mirror World, Mirai makes her way toward Beyond the Boundary's core.
| 11 | "Black World"; Transliteration: "Kuro no Sekai" (Japanese: 黒の世界) | Ichirou Miyoshi | Nao Naitō | December 11, 2013 | |
After a three month coma, Akihito learns that his separation from the Beyond the Boundary killed Mirai and nullified of his immortality. Akihito demands to speak with Izumi, but Hiroomi says it is no use. Izumi arrives and explains the nature of Beyond the Boundary and the use of Mirai's blood to defeat it. That evening, Akihito opens his last email from Mirai, where she thanks him for helping her gain self-acceptance. Miroku deduces that Beyond the Boundary retreated into another dimension to battle Mirai while absorbing the supernatural energy from the real world. Miroku uses the spear to inject energy into Beyond the Boundary and exposes a black sphere hovering above the city, which attracts and absorbs all of the city's youmu. At the Literary Club, Yayoi informs Akihito, Mitsuki, and Hiroomi of Mirai's survival and battle against Beyond the Boundary. She gives Akihito the shard of Beyond the Boundary's stone, restoring some of his powers, while explaining that it emerged when he was possessed by the Hollow Shadow. Despite Izumi's warning, Akihito enters the black sphere and catches Mirai during her battle with Beyond the Boundary.
| 12 | "Grey World"; Transliteration: "Haiiro no Sekai" (Japanese: 灰色の世界) | Taiichi Ogawa | Miku Kadowaki | December 18, 2013 | |
As Mirai and Akihito reunite, Izumi demands that Yayoi explain the nature of half-youmu. Yayoi escapes after warning them of the Society's movement. Akihito uses his powers to defend himself from Beyond the Boundary's attacks before he and Mirai enter its core. Elsewhere, Shizuku, Sakura, Hiroomi, Mitsuki and Izumi confront Miroku, who seals himself and Izumi inside a barrier. Mirai manages to impale Beyond the Boundary with her sword. Meanwhile, Hiroomi enters Miroku's barrier and learns that both Miroku and Izumi harbor youmu within their bodies. Izumi impales Miroku, who seemingly self-destructs. Meanwhile, Akihito and Mirai face and overcome their dark memories inside Beyond the Boundary's core and find themselves in a ferocious battle against an army of youmu. As Beyond the Boundary emerges, Akihito beats it into submission and reabsorbs it. With Beyond the Boundarymgone, the Mirror World and Mirai begin disappearing; Mirai and Akihito share a tender moment before she disappears. The world returns to normal, the incident is covered, up and Hiroomi takes over the Nase clan. Akihito mourns Mirai, but suddenly enters the school roof when her ring disappears and reunites with her. After declaring his feelings for her, Akihito returns Mirai's glasses.
| 0–OVA | "Daybreak"; Transliteration: "Shinonome" (Japanese: 東雲) | Unknown | TBA | July 2, 2014 | |
Bundled with the seventh Blu-ray/DVD volume of Kyoukai no Kanata. Episode 0 takes place three years prior to the TV series when the Nase siblings meet Akihito for the first time in a mission for Hiroomi. Mitsuki follows her brother on this mission and their goal is to subjugate Akihito.

=== Beyond the Boundary Idol Trial! ===
| No. | English title Original Japanese title | Storyboard | Original release date | Refs. |
|---|---|---|---|---|
| 1 | "Even as You Waver, The Nation Judges You #1"; Transliteration: "Mayoi Nagara mo Kimi o Sabaku Tami #1" (Japanese: ～迷いながらも君を裁く民～ #1) | Taichi Ishidate | November 18, 2013 | |
Akihito somehow finds himself in a courtroom as a defendant being tried for his glasses fetish by super deformed idol versions of accusers Mitsuki, Mirai and Sakura along with Judge Ai. As Akihito refuses to admit any wrongdoing, the girls present evidence depicting him staring into a glasses store for hours, taking pictures of Mirai's glasses and buying pictures of girls wearing glasses from Ayaka. Finding him guilty, Ai sentences Akihito to witness the destruction of Mirai's glasses.
| 2 | "Even as You Waver, The Nation Judges You #2"; Transliteration: "Mayoi Nagara mo Kimi o Sabaku Tami #2" (Japanese: ～迷いながらも君を裁く民～ #2) | Hiroko Utsumi | December 2, 2013 | |
Shizuku somehow finds herself on trial for her teenage behavior. However Mitsuki, Mirai and Sakura remain initially hesitant in sentencing Shizuku out of pity for her failure to grow up. After Ai teases Shizuku's teenage-looking hairstyle the girls then present their evidence depicting Shizuku taking teenage compliments seriously and also struggling to maintain an unnaturally perfect posture despite her age. Finding her guilty, Ai sentences Shizuku to cosplay as a sixteen-year-old high school girl.
| 3 | "Even as You Waver, The Nation Judges You #3"; Transliteration: "Mayoi Nagara mo Kimi o Sabaku Tami #3" (Japanese: ～迷いながらも君を裁く民～ #3) | Hiroko Utsumi | December 16, 2013 | |
Hiroomi appears in the courtroom and proudly flaunts his nude body under the guise of training to overcome his cold hypersensitivity, much to the distress of the girls. Enraged, Mitsuki uses various means to attack Hiroomi who only seems to revel in the former's anger. After Hiroomi openly admits his perversion, Ai finds him guilty and sentences him to have his hands stuck under Akihito's armpits for three days. However Akihito finds it much of a punishment for himself rather than for Hiroomi.
| 4 | "Even as You Waver, The Nation Judges You #4"; Transliteration: "Mayoi Nagara mo Kimi o Sabaku Tami #4" (Japanese: ～迷いながらも君を裁く民～ #4) | TBA | July 2, 2014 | |
Akihito is standing in the courtroom when his mother Yayoi appears and begins to embarrass him. It's revealed that she is on trial for being annoying. She is sentenced to switch bodies with Akihito, however she begins to embarrass him further while in his body.
| 5 | "Even as You Waver, The Nation Judges You #5"; Transliteration: "Mayoi Nagara mo Kimi o Sabaku Tami #5" (Japanese: ～迷いながらも君を裁く民～ #5) | TBA | July 2, 2014 | |
Izumi is called to stand trial, but the girls are too terrified of her to sentence her with anything and proclaim her innocent. She responds that she must have been brought there under false charges and steps forward to punish them, smiling. The camera cuts away as the girls let out a collective scream. After this, Akihito reveals the episode, and possibly the previous 4, were just a weird dream he had.

== Home media ==
Pony Canyon released the complete Beyond the Boundary series in Japan on six Blu-ray and DVD volumes between January 8 and June 4, 2014. The seventh volume included the original first three episodes of the Idol Trial ONA and two additional ones. Sentai Filmworks will release the series in Region 1 on Blu-ray and DVD format on October 13, 2015. In addition, 'Mini Theatre' episodes were included with each of the 7 volumes.

Pony Canyon (Region 2 - Japan)
| Vol. | Episodes | Blu-ray / DVD artwork | Release date | Ref. |
|---|---|---|---|---|
| 1 | 1, 2, Mini Theatre 1 | Akihito Kanbara & Mirai Kuriyama | January 8, 2014 | |
| 2 | 3, 4, Mini Theatre 2 | Akihito, Mirai, Mitsuki & Hiroomi | February 5, 2014 | |
| 3 | 5, 6, Mini Theatre 3 | Ai, Mirai & Mitsuki | March 5, 2014 | |
| 4 | 7, 8, Mini Theatre 4 | Sakura & Mirai | April 2, 2014 | |
| 5 | 9, 10, Mini Theatre 5 | Mitsuki & Hiroomi | May 14, 2014 | |
| 6 | 11, 12, Mini Theatre 6 | Akihito & Mirai | June 4, 2014 | |
| 7 | 0 (Daybreak OVA), Idol Trial 1-5, Mini Theatre 7 | Akihito, Mitsuki & Hiroomi | July 2, 2014 | |

Sentai Filmworks (Region 1 - North America)
| Vol. | Episodes | Blu-ray / DVD artwork | BD / DVD Release date | BD Ref. | DVD Ref. |
|---|---|---|---|---|---|
| 1 | 1-12 (Note: Both BD and DVD volumes will include the Beyond the Boundary Idol Trail! ONA with the exception of Episode 0 (Daybreak), which will only be included in the Beyond the Boundary Collector's Edition BD/DVD, also released on October 13, 2015.) | Akihito Kanbara & Mirai Kuriyama | October 13, 2015 | | |
