= Caitlynn French =

American voice actress

- Born: Caitlynn Lindsay Shae French; May 8, 1989 (age 37); Fort Worth, Texas, U.S.
- Education: Southwestern College
- Occupation: Voice actress
- Years active: 2006–present
- Spouse: Justin Brasfield (m. 2014)
- Relatives: Shaelynn French (sister)

Caitlynn Lindsay Shae French (born May 8, 1989) is an American voice actress known for her work on English adaptations of Japanese anime shows and films. Some of her major voice roles include Shiro in No Game No Life, Tina Sprout in Black Bullet, Miyu Edelfelt in Fate/kaleid liner Prisma Illya, Hana Isuzu in Girls und Panzer, Naru Sekiya in Hanayamata, Ai Astin in Sunday Without God, Matsurika Shinoji in Maria Holic, Chiaki Kurihara from Bodacious Space Pirates, Mei Tachibana in Say "I love you", Kanna Makino in Tamako Market, and Leviathan in Leviathan The Last Defense.

== Biography ==
French was born in Fort Worth on May 8, 1989 and raised in Derby, Kansas. Along with her younger sister Shaelynn, she was drawn into the performing arts. As a high school student at Derby High School, French performed in musicals and stage plays such as West Side Story, Seussical and The People Vs. Maxine Lowe. She later attended Southwestern College in Winfield, Kansas and earned a degree in Theater Performance there in 2011.

== Filmography ==
=== Film ===
Year	Title	Role	Notes
2013	Love, Chunibyo & Other Delusions the Movie: Rikka Takanashi Revision	Female clerk	
2014	Bodacious Space Pirates: Abyss of Hyperspace	Chiaki Kurihara	
2014	Tamako Love Story	Kanna Makino	
2015	Beyond the Boundary: I'll Be Here – Past	Sakura Inami	
2015	Beyond the Boundary: I'll Be Here – Future	Sakura Inami	
2015	Girls und Panzer der Film	Hana Isuzu	
2017	No Game No Life: Zero	Schwi Dola	

=== Television ===
Year	Title	Role	Notes
2006	Intrigue in the Bakumatsu – Irohanihoheto	Additional Voices	Episode: "A Foul Star in the Sky"
2009	Kampfer	Ryouka Yamakawa	Guest role (5 episodes)
2009–2010	Armed Librarians: The Book of Bantorra	Qumola, Woman A, Additional Voices	Recurring role (27 episodes)
2009; 2011	Maria Holic	Matsurika Shinoji	Main role (24 episodes)
2011	Rio: Rainbow Gate!	Ille Adams	Recurring role (13 episodes)
2011	Mayo Chiki!	Kureha Sakamachi	Main role (13 episodes)
2011–2012	Majikoi!	Angel Itagaki, Additional Voices	Recurring role (9 episodes)
2012	Shining Hearts: Shiawase no Pan	Kagyua	Guest role (4 episodes)
2012	Bodacious Space Pirates	Chiaki Kurihara	Main role (20 episodes)
2012–2013	AKB0048	Suzuko Kanzaki	Main role (25 episodes) (Includes Next Stage)
2012	The Ambition of Oda Nobuna	Maeda Inuchiyo	Recurring role (12 episodes)
2012	Say I Love You	Mei Tachibana	Main role (13 episodes)
2012–2013	Girls und Panzer	Hana Isuzu	Main role (12 episodes)
2012–2014	Little Busters!	Mio Nishizono	Main role (Season 1); Recurring role (Refrain & EX) (28 episodes)
2013	Tamako Market	Kanna Makino	Main role (12 episodes)
2013	Little Busters!	Midori Nishizono	Guest role (2 episodes)
2013	My Youth Romantic Comedy Is Wrong, As I Expected	Minami Sagami	Guest role (4 episodes)
2013	Leviathan: The Last Defense	Leviathan	Main role (13 episodes)
2013	Hakkenden: Eight Dogs of the East	Princess Yana, Additional Voices	Guest role (6 episodes)
2013	The World God Only Knows	Tsukiyo Kujo, Vulcanus	Guest role (7 episodes)
2013	Golden Time	Chinami	Guest role (20 episodes)
2013	Beyond the Boundary	Sakura Inami	Recurring role (10 episodes)
2013–2014	Sunday Without God	Ai	Main role (13 episodes)
2013–2016	Fate/kaleid liner PRISMA☆ILLYA	Miyu Edelfelt	Main role (30 episodes) (Includes 2wei! nd 2wei Herz!)
2014	My Neighbor Seki: The Master of Killing Time	Sakura	Guest role (5 episodes)
2014	Black Bullet	Tina Sprout	Main role (10 episodes)
2014	No Game No Life	Shiro	Main role (12 episodes)
2014	Hanayamata	Naru Sekiya	Main role (12 episodes)
2014–2015	Cross Ange: Rondo of Angel and Dragon	Chris	Recurring role (20 episodes)
2016–2017; 2020	God Complex	Kebechet, Nike	Guest role (5 episodes)
2017	Just Because!	Additional Voices	Guest role (5 episodes)
2017	My Girlfriend is Shobitch	Additional Voices	Guest role (6 episodes)
2018	Hakumei and Mikochi	Koharu	Episode: “"A Ladder in the Tree/The Metropolitan Lifestyle/Photo of a Smile"
2019	7 Seeds	Hotaru	Guest role (3 episodes)
2020	BanG Dream!	Additional voices	Season 2
2020	The Pet Girl of Sakurasou	Mashiro Shiina	Main Role
2020	Fragtime	Misuzu Moritani	Main Role
2026	Chained Soldier 2	Saki Tokoyama	Recurring Role

=== Video games ===
Year	Title	Role	Notes
2016	Lucid9: Inciting Incident	Airi Hiraga	
2016	Backstage Pass	Trina	
2017	Valentine Panic!	Leia	
