= Kira Vincent-Davis =

American voice actress

- Occupation: Voice actress
- Years active: 1998–present

Kira Vincent-Davis is an American voice actress best known for her work in English-language versions of Japanese anime. She voices Lucy/Nyu in Elfen Lied, Anchovy in Girls und Panzer, Izuna Hatsuse in No Game No Life, Ayumu Kasuga in Azumanga Daioh, Mirai Kuriyama in Beyond the Boundary, Kansai in World's End Club, Minagi Tohno in Air, Mizuki Tachibana in Gravion, Rino Rando and Pucchan in Best Student Council, Chaika Trabant in Chaika - The Coffin Princess, Yuki Hanzomon in Release the Spyce, Maki Kasahara in The Place Promised in our Early Days, Rin Namiki in Kandagawa Jet Girls, and Mio Sakamoto in the Strike Witches series. She also narrates all of the videos on the YouTube channel 'Physics Videos by Eugene Khutoryansky'.

== Filmography ==
=== Anime ===
Year	Title	Role	Notes	Source
2000	Martian Successor Nadesico	Ruri Hoshino		
2001	Princess Nine	Koharu Hotta		
2002	Steel Angel Kurumi	Nakahito Kagura		
2003	Divergence Eve	Misaki Kureha		
2003	Najica Blitz Tactics	Najica Hiiragi		
2003	Super Gals	Miyu Yamazaki		
2004	Azumanga Daioh	Ayumu Kasuga		
2004	Divergence Eve - Misaki Chronicles	Misaki Kureha		
2004	Gravion	Mizuki Tachibana		
2005	A Tree of Palme	Palme		
2005	Elfen Lied	Lucy/Nyu		
2006	Nerima Daikon Brothers	Pandaikon		
2006	UFO Ultramaiden Valkyrie	Valkyrie		
2007	Air	Minagi Tono		
2007	Best Student Council	Rino Rando, Pucchan		
2007	Magikano	Maika Yoshikawa		
2010	Strike Witches	Mio Sakamoto	also season 2, Operation Victory Arrow, 501st Joint Fighter Wing Take Off! (and movie), Road to Berlin, and World Witches Take Off!	
2011	Rosario + Vampire: Capu2	Kokoa Shuzen		
2012–2019	Fairy Tail	Ur		
2014	Cross Ange	Salia Tereshkova		
2014	Girls und Panzer: This Is the Real Anzio Battle!	Anchovy	OVA	
2014	Infinite Stratos II	Kanzashi Sarashiki		
2015	Beyond the Boundary	Mirai Kuriyama	Steelbook Blu-Ray	
2015	Brynhildr in the Darkness	Saori		
2015	Chaika the Coffin Princess	Chaika Trabant	also season 2	
2015	Muv-Luv Alternative - Total Eclipse	Kazusa Yamashiro		
2015	No Game No Life	Izuna Hatsuse		
2015	Outbreak Company	Petralka Anne Eldant III		
2015–2016	Akame ga Kill!	Seryu Ubiquitous		
2016	Dennō Coil	Kyoko Okonogi, Akira Hashimoto		
2016	Fate/kaleid liner Prisma Illya 2wei!	Chloe von Einzbern	also 2wei Herz	
2016	Flying Witch	Anzu Shiina		
2016	Flip Flappers	Irodori		
2016	Trinity Seven	Hijiri Kasuga		
2016	Utawarerumono	Elulu		
2016	Wizard Barristers: Bemmashi Cecil	Natsuna Hataru, Seira		
2017	Ushio and Tora	Reiko Hanyu, Kuragi		
2017	Diabolik Lovers More, Blood	Edgar		
2017	Chihayafuru	Shinobu Wakamiya		
2017	Gate	Panache Kure Falgi		
2017	Monster Musume	Zombina		
2017	Squid Girl	Eiko Aizawa	Season 2	
2018	Devils' Line	Nanako Tenjo		
2018	Armed Girl's Machiavellism	Rin Onigawara		
2018	Doreiku the Animation	Lucie Suginami		
2018	Food Wars! The Second Plate	Taki Tsunozaki		
2018	UQ Holder!	Setsuna Sakurazaka, Sayo Aisaka		
2018	Release the Spyce	Yuki Hanzomon		
2018	Takunomi	Makato Kiriyama		
2018	The Seven Heavenly Virtues	Uriel		
2019	Golden Time	Nana		
2019	Hakumei and Mikochi	Sen		
2019	Domestic Girlfriend	Kanae/Jun		
2019	How Clumsy you are, Miss Ueno	Nishinara		
2019	Kämpfer	Electrocuted Wildcat		
2019	My Youth Romantic Comedy Is Wrong, As I Expected	Kaori Orimoto		
2020	After the Rain	Yuto Kondo		
2020	BanG Dream!	Asuka Toyama	Season 2	
2020	The Pet Girl of Sakurasou	Yayoi Honjō/Fuka Kamiigusa		
2020	Wasteful Days of High School Girls	Kanade "Majime" Ninomae		
2021	Kandagawa Jet Girls	Rin Namiki		
2022	Himouto! Umaru-chan R	Hikari Kongō		
2022	I've Somehow Gotten Stronger When I Improved My Farm-Related Skills	Young Testa		
2022	Vermeil in Gold	Lilia		
2023	Farming Life in Another World	Leely		
2023	The Dreaming Boy Is a Realist	Ayano Mita		
2023	Love Flops	Loverin		
2024	Helck	Vermilio		
2024	The Vexations of a Shut-In Vampire Princess	Karen Helvetius		
2024	Level 1 Demon Lord and One Room Hero	Rebecca		
2025	Loner Life in Another World	Shimazaki		
2025	I'm a Behemoth, an S-Ranked Monster, but Mistaken for a Cat, I Live as an Elf Girl's Pet	Aria		
2025	Bad Girl	Suzu Suzukaze		

=== Film ===
Year	Title	Role	Notes	Source
2003	Martian Successor Nadesico: The Motion Picture – Prince of Darkness	Ruri Hoshino		
2005	The Place Promised in Our Early Days	Maki Kasahara		
2016	Girls und Panzer der Film	Anchovy		
2016	Strike Witches the Movie	Mio Sakamoto		
2016	Bodacious Space Pirates: Abyss of Hyperspace	Kanata Mugen		
2017	No Game No Life: Zero	Izuna Hatsuse		
2017	Beyond the Boundary: I'll Be Here – Past	Mirai Kuriyama		
2017	Beyond the Boundary: I'll Be Here – Future	Mirai Kuriyama		
2017	Tamako Love Story	Shiori Asagiri	Credited as Francis Caorrots	

=== Video games ===
Year	Title	Role	Notes	Source
2003	Unlimited Saga	Jeanne Maure		
2021	World's End Club	Kansai		

== Music ==
- Voices for Peace (2006 album) – Vocals: "Fortunate Son"
