= Beast Tamer =

Japanese light novel series

- First light novel volume cover

勇者パーティーを追放されたビーストテイマー、最強種の猫耳少女と出会う (Yūsha Pātī o Tsuihō Sareta Bīsuto Teimā, Saikyōshu no Nekomimi Shōjo to Deau)
- Genre: Fantasy, harem
- Novel series
- Written by: Suzu Miyama
- Published by: Shōsetsuka ni Narō
- Original run: June 11, 2018 – present
- Light novel
- Written by: Suzu Miyama
- Illustrated by: Hotosoka (vol. 1 – 8); Nozomi (vol. 9 onwards)
- Published by: Kodansha
- Imprint: Kodansha Ranobe Books
- Original run: May 2, 2019 – present
- Volumes: 12
- Manga
- Written by: Suzu Miyama
- Illustrated by: Moto Shigemura
- Published by: Square Enix
- Magazine: Manga Up!
- Original run: January 30, 2019 – present
- Volumes: 12
- Anime television series
- Directed by: Atsushi Nigorikawa
- Produced by: Yuuko Esaka; Shouta Komatsu; Hideaki Miyamoto; Aya Nakama; Yuuki Satou; Hiroyasu Taniguchi; Yang Guoxiang; Shintarou Yoshitake; Takashi Ooba
- Written by: Takashi Aoshima
- Music by: Yuki Hayashi; Alisa Okehazama; Naoyuki Chikatani
- Studio: EMT Squared
- Licensed by: Crunchyroll (streaming); SA/SEA: Muse Communication
- Original network: Tokyo MX, ytv, TVA, BS Fuji, AT-X
- English network: SEA: Animax Asia
- Original run: October 2, 2022 – December 24, 2022
- Episodes: 13
- icon

Beast Tamer (勇者パーティーを追放されたビーストテイマー、最強種の猫耳少女と出会う, Yūsha Pātī o Tsuihou Sareta Bīsuto Teimā, Saikyōshu no Nekomimi Shōjo to Deau; "The Beast Tamer Who Was Exiled from His Party Meets a Cat Girl from the Strongest Race") is a Japanese light novel series written by Suzu Miyama and illustrated by Hotosoka. It has been published online via the user-generated novel publishing website Shōsetsuka ni Narō since June 2018. It was later acquired by Kodansha, who has released twelve volumes since May 2019 under their Kodansha Ranobe Books imprint. A manga adaptation illustrated by Moto Shigemura has been serialized in Square Enix's Manga Up! website since January 2019; twelve tankōbon volumes have been released as of September 2026. An anime television series adaptation by EMT Squared aired from October to December 2022.

== Plot ==
Rein is a beast tamer who was expelled from the hero Arios' party who consider him too weak because he only has the ability to form contracts with animals. While looking for work, Rein rescues Kanade, a member of the cat spirit tribe who becomes his companion. By forming a contract with a member from one of the strongest races known as an "ultimate species", Rein obtains some of her powers, becoming much stronger. The two then begin their journey together, with Rein befriending and taming other girls from different races who become powerful companions while obtaining new abilities with each new contract formed, his group eventually becoming far more powerful than Arios and his party. Overcome with anger and frustration, Arios begins loathing Rein, neglecting his duties as a hero and focusing on revenge against him and his friends instead.

== Characters ==
Rein Shroud (レイン・シュラウド, Rein Shuraudo)
Voiced by: Shōya Chiba (Japanese); Kevin D. Thelwell (English)
The protagonist, a Beast Tamer, who originally had no other combat skills except basic martial arts training and weak fire and healing spells, which leads him to be expelled from the hero's party. However, upon meeting Kanade and making a contract with her, Rein learns he can obtain other skills from members of strongest races, which makes him stronger with each new contract. A skilled strategist, Rein is capable of taming multiple animals at once and using their abilities to have the advantage in combat. Rein's optimistic and caring attitude makes him earn the respect of his friends and the loyalty, devotion and even infatuation from his partners. Later Rein discovers he is a descendant of the original Hero who obtained power directly from the gods, which is the reason why his abilities far surpass those of regular Beast Tamers. Rein is also the sole survivor of his home village, whose inhabitants were also skilled tamers like him, before it was destroyed by demons.
Kanade (カナデ)
Voiced by: Azumi Waki (Japanese); Jalitza Delgado (English)
A teenage member of the Cat Tribe, the rarest of the strongest races, Kanade left her hometown in search for adventure until she is rescued by Rein and she becomes his friend, agreeing to be his partner, and later, his first wife. She possesses superhuman strength and endurance, a trait Rein inherits upon making a contract with her.
Tania (タニア)
Voiced by: Rumi Okubo (Japanese); Molly Searcy (English)
A teenage member of the Dragon Race, Tania travels the world challenging other fighters until she is defeated by Rein and Kanade. Upon befriending them, she decides to join the party as Rein's second partner, and later becomes his second wife. Tania possesses enhanced magical ability and Rein's contract with her increases the power of his spells.
Sora (ソラ) and Luna (ルナ, Runa)
Voiced by: Minami Tanaka (Sora), Maria Sashide (Luna) (Japanese); Francine Gonzalez (Sora), Celeste Perez (Luna) (English)
Twin sisters from the Fairy Race. Rein and the others first met Sora when she was trying to rescue Luna from a monster alone, until they helped her. Since then, they became close to Rein and became his third and fourth partners. Sora is more polite and reserved while Luna is more mischievous and playful. Both can hide their wings using magic to cover their true identity. Sora can conjure illusions and her contract with Rein gives him the ability to cast multiple spells in succession, while Luna is capable of enhancing and tuning another person's magic, improving the effectiveness of her and her sister's spells and her contract with Rein made him immune to the effect of abnormal conditions, including instant death magic.
Stella Enplace (ステラ・エンプレイス, Sutera Enpureisu)
Voiced by: Rie Takahashi (Japanese); Giovannie Cruz (English)
The vice-captain turned Captain of the Horizon branch of the Order of Knights. When Rein stands up to the mayor of Horizon, she asks him for help in taking down the corrupt knights and arresting the lord and Edgar for the many crimes they committed.
Nina (ニーナ, Nīna)
Voiced by: Marika Kōno (Japanese); Kristen McGuire (English)
A member of the Demigod Race, she is a child with fox features. Nina was worshipped as a deity on her homeland, until she is captured and turned into a slave upon being forced to wear a magic collar to restrain her, until she is rescued by Rein, who uses his magic to break Nina free from the collar and she becomes his fifth partner. Nina can teleport herself and others with her instantly and her contract with Rein gives him the power to materialize specific items with his magic.
Tina Hollee (ティナ・ホーリー, Tina Hōrī)
Voiced by: M.A.O (Japanese); Morgan Berry (English)
The ghost of a young maid haunting a mansion. She befriends Rein and his party after they buy the mansion and move there. After Rein's group help Tina enact revenge by having her murderer arrested for the crime, she becomes his sixth partner. Her contract with Rein gives him the power to manipulate gravity.
Iris (イリス, Irisu)
A young child member of the Celestial Race, considered the most powerful of the strongest races, able to cast divine magic. She loathes humans and after being freed from her seal by Arios, she agrees with his plea to kill Rein for him. However, upon meeting Rein, she becomes interested in him instead, eventually befriending him and becoming his seventh partner. Aside from casting various types of magic, Iris can summon weapons and animals to assist in battle, a trait that Rein inherits with their contract, albeit with less proficiency.
Rifa (リファ, Rifa)
A member of the Oni Race, vampire branch, who can manipulate her blood to use as a weapon and perform powerful shadow magic. She meets Rein and the others while looking for help to deal with demons attacking her hometown. After her hometown is saved, she becomes Rein's eighth partner, their contract giving him the power to charm or paralyze enemies with his glance.
Arios Orlando (アリオス・オーランド, Ariosu Ōrando)
Voiced by: Nobunaga Shimazaki (Japanese); Alejandro Saab (English)
The main antagonist in half of the series. Arios is the Hero chosen by the king to slay the Demon Lord and defeat his army. As a descendant of the original Hero, Arios possesses a skill called "Limit Break" which means his growth potential as a warrior is limitless. However, after being defeated by Rein, who became much stronger since he was expelled from his party, Arios becomes extremely jealous of him, to the point of making plans to ensure his downfall. When Arios' true colors are exposed by the royalty, his title is revoked by the king. In response, Arios betrays and kills the other members of his party and joins forces with the demons instead to continue with his plans of revenge. Having realized his former friend became irredemable, Rein kills him afterwards.
Edgar Fromware (エドガー・フロムウェア, Edogā Furomuuea)
Voiced by: Tomohito Takatsuka (Japanese); Matthew Elkin (English)
The corrupt son of a mayor, who helps Arios with his plans. He met his demise after being turned into a demon and being killed by Rein. In the manga and novel series, Edgar survived his transformation and defeat, but was left maimed for life.

== Media ==
=== Light novels ===
Written by Suzu Miyama began publication as a web novel on the novel publishing site Shōsetsuka ni Narō on June 11, 2018. The series was later acquired by Kodansha who have published it in print as a light novel with illustrations by Hotosoka since May 2, 2019. The announcement of printed version and manga adaptation was on the same date, October 20, 2018. As of March 2, 2026, twelve volumes have been released.

No.	Release date	ISBN
1	May 2, 2019	978-4-06-515548-6
2	July 2, 2019	978-4-06-516596-6
3	December 2, 2019	978-4-06-518323-6
4	April 30, 2020	978-4-06-519593-2
5	November 2, 2020	978-4-06-521536-4
6	May 6, 2021	978-4-06-523830-1
7	November 2, 2021	978-4-06-526202-3
8	July 1, 2022	978-4-06-528776-7
9	September 2, 2024	978-4-06-535806-1
10	February 28, 2025	978-4-06-537819-9
11	September 2, 2025	978-4-06-539665-0
12	March 2, 2026	978-4-06-541729-4

=== Manga ===
A manga adaptation illustrated by Moto Shigemura began serialization in Square Enix's Manga Up! website on January 30, 2019. The first volume was released on June 12, 2019. As of September 2026, twelve volumes have been released.

No.	Japanese release date	Japanese ISBN
1	June 12, 2019	978-4-7575-6160-1
2	November 12, 2019	978-4-7575-6384-1
3	April 11, 2020	978-4-7575-6598-2
4	October 7, 2020	978-4-7575-6880-8
5	April 7, 2021	978-4-7575-7181-5
6	October 7, 2021	978-4-7575-7517-2
7	September 7, 2022	978-4-7575-8008-4
8	September 7, 2023	978-4-7575-8767-0
9	September 6, 2024	978-4-7575-9401-2
10	August 6, 2025	978-4-7575-9989-5
11	March 6, 2026	978-4-301-00366-3
12	September 7, 2026	978-4-301-00742-5

=== Anime ===
An anime television series adaptation was announced on June 10, 2022. The series is animated by EMT Squared and directed by Atsushi Nigorikawa, with Takashi Aoshima overseeing the series' scripts, Shuuhei Yamamoto designing the characters, and Yuki Hayashi, Alisa Okehazama, and Naoyuki Chikatani composing the music. It aired from October 2 to December 25, 2022, on AT-X, Tokyo MX, ytv, TVA, and BS Fuji. The opening theme song is "Change The World" by MADKID, while the ending theme song is "LOVE&MOON" by Marika Kōno. Crunchyroll streamed the series worldwide outside of Asia; an English dub premiered on the service on October 15, 2022. Muse Communication licensed it in South and Southeast Asia.

No.	Title	Directed by	Written by	Storyboarded by	Original release date (Note: Episodes are released on ABEMA a day before their air dates on television.)
1	"Meeting of Fate"; Transliteration: "Unmei no Deai" (Japanese: 運命の出会い)	Atsushi Nigorikawa	Takashi Aoshima	Atsushi Nigorikawa	October 2, 2022
Rein, the Beast Tamer from the hero Arios's party, is expelled for being considered useless. During the exam to become an adventurer, he meets a girl and a member of the Cat Tribe, Kanade, and saves her from peril. The two become friends and their journey together begins.
2	"Comrades"; Transliteration: "Nakama" (Japanese: 仲間)	Mitsutaka Noshitani	Takashi Aoshima	Mitsutaka Noshitani	October 9, 2022
Rein discovers that his contract with Kanade gave him the same superhuman strength as her, allowing him to defeat a thug who tries to win Kanade from him in an arm wrestling match. While doing their first job as adventurers, they find a merchant being attacked by bandits and set out to rescue him and deal with the criminals.
3	"Another Ultimate Species"; Transliteration: "Mō Hitori no Saikyōshu" (Japanese: もう一人の最強種)	Naoya Murakawa	Takamitsu Kōno	Akari Ranzaki	October 16, 2022
Rein and Kanade are tasked to subdue an unknown thug appearing on the south bridge, where they meet and fight Tania, a member of the powerful Dragon Tribe, who challenges them to a duel. After she is defeated, Tania recognizes Rein's worth and joins his party.
4	"Dragonoid Power"; Transliteration: "Ryūzoku no Chikara" (Japanese: 竜族の力)	Zhou Xu	Takamitsu Kōno	Toshihiko Masuda	October 23, 2022
Tania and Kanade learn from Rein about his past, including how he became an orphan and was briefly part of the hero's party. Meanwhile, Arios realizes that he needs Rein's help to fulfill an important quest and decides to take advantage of him.
5	"Beast Tamer VS Hero"; Transliteration: "Bīsuto Teimā Buiesu Yūsha" (Japanese: ビーストテイマーVS勇者)	Harume Kosaka	Takashi Aoshima	Harume Kosaka; Hisashi Ishii	October 30, 2022
Rein and Arios meet again. Arios requests for his help an retrieving a weapon called the Shield of Truth, but he declines. Angry at Arios and his companions for treating Rein with disrespect, Tania and Kanade demand them to apologize, leading to a duel between both groups.
6	"The Lost Woods"; Transliteration: "Mayoi no Mori" (Japanese: 迷いの森)	Kōki Onoue	Takamitsu Kōno	Kōki Onoue	November 6, 2022
After easily defeating Arios and his party, Rein, Kanade and Tania accept his quest to retrieve the Shield of Truth, which is being guarded in the Lost Woods, for him. The trio gets lost in the forest, unable to make progress, when they come in contact with Sora, a member of the Fairy Tribe, who demands that they leave, but they manage to reason with her. She is desperate because a monster captured her twin sister Luna and her tribe will not help rescue her.
7	"The Captive Fairy"; Transliteration: "Toraware no Seireizoku" (Japanese: 囚われの精霊族)	Yūki Kusakabe	Takamitsu Kōno	Yūki Kusakabe	November 13, 2022
Rein and his friends confront the monster to rescue Luna. After succeeding, Sora and Luna decide to leave the forest and join Rein's party, as they are no longer willing to live with their tribe.
8	"Let's Make Weapons"; Transliteration: "Buki o Tsukurō" (Japanese: 武器を作ろう)	Naoya Murakawa	Takashi Aoshima	Atsushi Nigorikawa	November 20, 2022
Having completed Arios' request, Rein looks for a new weapon with the best blacksmith in town, and after earning his respect, accepts his request to discover why his personal mine has suddenly depleted. Arios still holds a grudge against Rein and vows to kill him.
9	"Beast Tamer VS Beast Tamer"; Transliteration: "Bīsuto Teimā Buiesu Bīsuto Teimā" (Japanese: ビーストテイマーVSビーストテイマー)	Zhou Xu	Takamitsu Kōno	Toshihiko Masuda	November 27, 2022
Rein and the others discover that the mine is occupied by a group of thieves led by another Beast Tamer who took control of a powerful monster and they fight him to stop their plans.
10	"Darkness in Horizon"; Transliteration: "Horaizun no Yami" (Japanese: ホライズンの闇)	Kōki Onoue	Takashi Aoshima	Kōki Onoue	December 4, 2022
Rein is approached by Edgar, the son of the local Mayor, who wants to take Sora and Luna with him by force and even tries to blackmail him, but Rein stops him with powerful magic, forcing him to retreat empty-handed. Soon after, a female knight called Stella Enplace turns to Rein and his party, asking for their help in order to bring Edgar and his father to justice for their crimes. Meanwhile, Arios approaches Edgar as part of his plan to get his revenge on Rein.
11	"Black Waves"; Transliteration: "Kuroi Hadō" (Japanese: 黒い波動)	Yoshihide Kuriyama; Harume Kosaka	Takashi Aoshima	Hisashi Ishii	December 11, 2022
After dealing with the corrupt knights, Rein and his party storm Edgar's house to arrest him while rescuing Nina, a member of the Demigod Race, who was his prisoner. He manages to remove her slave collar, but this wears him out. However, Edgar uses the ring he got from Arios to set a mortal trap for Rein, which fails because of a new power he earned from his contract with Luna.
12	"Champion"; Transliteration: "Eiyū" (Japanese: 英雄)	Naoya Murakawa	Takashi Aoshima	Akari Ranzaki	December 18, 2022
Edgar is possessed by a demon inhabiting the ring and transforms into a monster, forcing Rein and his party to fight him desperately to protect the city. The members of Arios' party consider providing aid, but Arios refuses to not expose his involvement with it.
13	"A Home for All"; Transliteration: "Minna no Ie" (Japanese: みんなの家)	Atsushi Nigorikawa	Takashi Aoshima	Atsushi Nigorikawa	December 25, 2022
After saving the city of Horizon from the demon, Rein and the others welcome Nina as a member of their party. They decide to settle nearby and look for a suitable place, but the mansion they want to move in is haunted by a ghost called Tina. The party confronts Tina and after befriending her, they convince her to let them move in. Sometime later, Arios and his companions are shunned by the local residents for refusing to fight the demon, while Rein enjoys life with his companions in their new house, certain that their adventures together are just beginning.
