= Nora, Princess, and Stray Cat =

Japanese video game and anime series

ノラと皇女と野良猫ハート (Nora to Ōjo to Noraneko Hāto)
- Genre: Comedy, Romance, Fantasy
- Video game
- Developer: Harukaze
- Publisher: Harukaze
- Genre: Eroge, visual novel
- Platform: Windows, PlayStation Vita
- Released: Windows; February 26, 2016; PlayStation Vita; September 28, 2017
- Anime television series
- Directed by: Kenshirō Morii
- Produced by: Hiroyuki Kimura
- Written by: Hato
- Music by: Shintarō Mori
- Studio: DMM.futureworks; W-Toon Studio
- Original network: Tokyo MX, Sun TV
- Original run: July 12, 2017 – September 27, 2017
- Episodes: 12

Nora, Princess, and Stray Cat, released in English as The Princess, the Stray Cat, and Matters of the Heart, is a Japanese adult visual novel developed by Harukaze and was released for Windows on February 26, 2016. A 12-episode anime television series adaptation aired from July to September 2017. PlayStation Vita (PSV) version of the game was released on September 28, 2017. The original title is Nora to Ōjo to Noraneko Heart (ノラと皇女と野良猫ハート, Nora to Ōjo to Noraneko Hāto; lit. Nora, Princess, and Stray Cat Heart), and it is officially abbreviated as Noratoto (ノラとと) in Japan.

External videos
- Nora, Princess, and Stray Cat. teaser movie (Harukaze) - YouTube

== Gameplay ==
Nora, Princess, and Stray Cat is a romance visual novel in which the player assumes the role of Nora Handa. Much of its gameplay is spent on reading the story's narrative and dialogue. The text in the game is accompanied by character sprites, which represent who Nora is talking to, over background art. Throughout the game, the player encounters CG artwork at certain points in the story, which take the place of the background art and character sprites. The game follows a branching plot line with multiple endings, and depending on the decisions that the player makes during the game, the plot will progress in a specific direction. There are four main plot lines that the player will have the chance to experience, one for each heroine. Throughout gameplay, the player is given multiple options to choose from, and text progression pauses at these points until a choice is made. Some decisions can lead the game to end prematurely, which offer an alternative ending to the plot. To view all plot lines in their entirety, the player will have to replay the game multiple times and choose different choices to further the plot to an alternate direction. Throughout gameplay, there are scenes with sexual CGs depicting Nora and a given heroine having sex.

== Plot ==
Nora, Princess, and Stray Cat set in a coastal town named Sakuragabuchi (桜ヶ淵). The story's protagonist, Nora Handa, is a student at Sakuragabichi Academy (桜ヶ淵学園, Sakuragabuchi Gakuen). One morning in spring he meets a beautiful girl at a park on his way to school. Her name is Patricia. She is a princess of the underworld whose mission is the eradication of all life. However, she gets sick just after coming to the surface and Nora kindly looks after her while she recovers. Later that same day, a kiss from Patricia transforms Nora into a black cat and the magic of which compels him to serve the demon.

== Characters ==
=== Main characters ===
Nora Handa (反田 ノラ, Handa Nora)
Voiced by: Ayaka Asai (anime)
The main protagonist and a second-year student of Sakuragabuchi Academy. His mother died several years ago.
Patricia of End (パトリシア・オブ・エンド, Patorishia obu Endo)
Voiced by: Yūka Kotorii (PC game), Natsumi Takamori (anime, PSV game)
The main heroine and a princess of the underworld, the place where the dead live. She has two sisters named Lucia and Euracia, and transfers into Sakuragabuchi Academy along with them.
Michi Kuroki (黒木 未知, Kuroki Michi)
Voiced by: Sora Haruka (PC game), Eri Sendai (anime, PSV game)
A second-year student and Nora's childhood friend. She has a serious personality and is in the school's discipline committee. She always studies hard and is good in the school. She is the first person who finds out that Nora has transformed into a cat.
Shachi Yūri (夕莉 シャチ, Yūri Shachi)
Voiced by: Misaki Kamishiro (PC game), Yū Asakawa (anime, PSV game)
A second-year student who lives along with Nora. She was an orphan whom Nora found at a beach in his childhood. She is good at cooking and weather forecast. She has a quiet personality and a polite manner of speaking.
Yūki Asuhara (明日原 ユウキ, Asuhara Yūki)
Voiced by: Hana Kiritani (PC game), Atsumi Tanezaki (anime, PSV game)
A first-year student and Nora's underclasswoman. Although the same age as Nora, she entered Sakuragabuchi Academy a year later than he. She looks like a gyaru and calls Nora as "Norapai" (ノラパイ; "Nora-senpai").

=== Other characters ===
Lucia of End (ルーシア・オブ・エンド, Rūshia obu Endo)
Voiced by: Mai Indeka (PC game), Yō Taichi (anime, PSV game)
Patricia's older sister. She looks like strict, but indulges her two younger sisters.
Euracia of End (ユウラシア・オブ・エンド, Yuurashia obu Endo)
Voiced by: Ui (PC game), Ayuru Ōhashi (anime, PSV game)
Lucia and Patricia's younger sister. She has a childish personality and is curious about the surface world.
Nobuchina Takada (高田 ノブチナ, Takada Nobuchina)
Voiced by: Mitsuko Hachi (PC game), Yuri Yamaoka (anime, PSV game)
A second-year student and Nora's classmate. Her family is a local yakuza.
Tanaka-chan (田中ちゃん)
Voiced by: Tayo Matsude (PC game), Juri Kimura (anime, PSV game)
A second-year student and Nora's classmate. She has a shy personality.
Ida (井田)
Voiced by: Kojirō Sasasaki (PC game), Takeaki Masuyama (anime, PSV game)
A second-year male student and Nora's classmate.
Underworld's mother (冥界の母, Meikai no haha)
Voiced by: Reina Saji (PC game)
Patricia, Lucia, and Euracia's mother and the queen of the underworld. She lives in a castle in the underworld.

== Development and release ==
Nora, Princess, and Stray Cat is Harukaze's second game after Love of Love Emperor of Love!, their debut title released on May 31, 2013. The game's first news was released in August 2015.

The game's scenario was written by Hato, the representative director of Harukaze. Hato is also one of the five authors at Wagamama High Spec, a visual novel developed by Madosoft. The character design was provided by Itsuki Ōzora; super deformed illustrations was provided by Haruka Kusakabe.

The game's free trial version, playable the prologue part of the story, became available for download on January 20, 2016, and the full game was released as a limited-edition version on February 26, 2016. A special edition version of the game to commemorate the anime adaptation was released on February 24, 2017. A PlayStation Vita (PSV) version of the game was released on September 28, 2017. A sequel game titled Nora, Princess, and Crying Cat (ノラと皇女と野良猫ハート2) or The Princess, the Stray Cat, and Matters of the Heart 2 was released on October 27, 2017. Four new characters appear in the sequel game: Iris December Uncry (アイリス・ディセンバー・アンクライ, Airisu Disenbā Ankurai), Noel the Nextseason (ノエル・ザ・ネクストシーズン, Noeru za Nekusutoshīzun), Nobuchika Takada (高田 ノブチカ, Takada Nobuchika), and Orca (オルカ, Oruka).

== Related media ==
=== Print ===
A 128-page guidebook for the game titled Nora, Princess, and Stray Cat Visual Fanbook (ノラと皇女と野良猫ハート -Nora, Princess, and Stray Cat.- ビジュアルファンブック) published from Enterbrain on June 24, 2016. A light novel adaptation written by Kentarō Kobayashi was published by Ichijinsha on June 30, 2017. A manga adaptation, illustrated by Eku Takeshima, titled Nora to Ōjo to Noraneko Heart: Pirikara Yūsha Nobuchina (ノラと皇女と野良猫ハート ピリ辛勇者ノブチナ; "Nora, Princess, and Stray Cat Heart: Spicy Hero Nobuchina") began serialization in the August 2017 issue of Dengeki G's Comic on June 30, 2017. Nobuchina Takada is the main protagonist in the manga.

=== Anime ===
Before the game's release, a short anime television series adaptation was announced on December 29, 2015. The series is directed by Kenshirō Morii and written by Hato. It aired from July 12 to September 20, 2017 on Tokyo MX and Sun TV as a 12-episode series of five-minute shorts. The anime television series' Blu-ray and DVD will be attached to the PlayStation Vita version of the game.

An Internet radio show to promote the anime titled Nora to Ōjo to Noraneko Radio (ノラと皇女と野良猫ラジオ; "Nora, Princess, and Stray Cat Radio") began airing on May 25, 2017. The show is produced by HiBiKi Radio Station and is streamed online every other Thursday. It is hosted by Atsumi Tanezaki and Yuri Yamaoka, the voice actresses of Yūki Asuhara and Nobuchina Takada.

A new anime project was announced on November 29, 2018.

== Music ==
External videos
- Nora, Princess, and Stray Cat. opening movie (Harukaze) - YouTube

The game's theme song is "Noraneko Heart" (野良猫ハート; "Stray Cat Heart"). It was written by Hato, composed by Drop, and sung by the voice cast of the main female characters: Yūka Kotorii, Sora Haruka, Misaki Kamishiro, and Hana Kiritani. The song is used as both the opening and ending themes.

There are four insert songs:

- "Re:Start!", written by Yukinoren, composed by Re-D, and sung by Yukinoren.
- "Brave Guardian", written by Shiki, composed by Re-D, and sung by Yukinoren.
- "Boku ga Kimi o Mamoru Riyū" (僕が君を護る理由; "The Reason I Protect You"), written by Tono, composed by Rimo Shinnosuke Mori, and sung by Tono.
- "Tsuki" (月; "The Moon") , written by Hato, composed by Pomi, sung by Shirome, and violin performance by Rina Akiyama.

The game's original sound track titled "Open Heart" (ノラと皇女と野良猫ハート オリジナルサウンドトラック「Open Heart」) was released from Harukaze on May 1, 2016.
