= Molly Searcy =

American actress

- Born: Molly Glyncora Searcy; November 25, 1986 (age 39); Houston, Texas, U.S.
- Education: University of Texas at Austin; Southern Methodist University
- Occupation: Voice actress
- Years active: 2004–present
- Website: mollysearcyofficial.com

Molly Glyncora Searcy (born November 25, 1986) is an American actress. Her notable roles were as Isuzu Sento in Amagi Brilliant Park, Rin Ōtomo in Psycho-Pass: Sinners of the System, Akame in Akame ga Kill!, Mako Reizei in Girls und Panzer, Ayaka Shindo in Beyond the Boundary, Centorea Shianus in Monster Musume, Tania in Beast Tamer, and Kiui Watase in Jellyfish Can't Swim in the Night.

== Filmography ==
=== Anime television series ===
Year	Title	Role	Notes	Source
2013	Girls und Panzer	Mako Reizei		
2014	Tamako Market	Michiko Ōji		
2015	Akame ga Kill!	Akame		
2015	Beyond the Boundary	Ayaka Shindo		
2015	Love, Chunibyo & Other Delusions: Heart Trob	Kazari Kannagi; Kumin's Aunt		
2017	Amagi Brilliant Park	Isuzu Sento		
2017	Monster Musume	Centorea "Cerea" Shianus		
2019	How Heavy Are the Dumbbells You Lift?	Nana Uehara		
2019	Why the Hell are You Here, Teacher!?	Saya Matsukaze		
2022–present	Natsume's Book of Friends	Hinoe		
2022	Beast Tamer	Tania		
2022	Spy × Family	Princess Honey		
2022	Ya Boy Kongming!	Kondo's Secretary		
2023	Mobile Suit Gundam: The Witch From Mercury	Golneri		
2023	Reborn as a Vending Machine, I Now Wander the Dungeon	Filmina		
2023	Management of a Novice Alchemist	Ophelia Millis		
2023	Shy	Unilord		
2023	Love Flops	Yoshino Feynman		
2023	One Piece	Kozuki Hiyori / Komurasaki; Princess Comane	Funimation/Crunchyroll Dub	
2024	I've Somehow Gotten Stronger When I Improved My Farm-Related Skills	Lucica Wayne		
2024	Gods' Games We Play	Miranda		
2024	Fairy Tail: 100 Years Quest	Karameel		
2024	Jellyfish Can't Swim in the Night	Kiui Watase		
2024	Nina the Starry Bride	Queen		
2024	Is It Wrong to Try to Pick Up Girls in a Dungeon?	Horn		
2025	Plus-Sized Elf	Satero		
2025	Yakuza Fiancé: Raise wa Tanin ga Ii	Yoshino		
2025	Let This Grieving Soul Retire!	Eva		
2026	Takopi's Original Sin	Happy Mama		
2026	Daemons of the Shadow Realm	young Yuru		

=== Anime films ===
Year	Title	Role	Notes	Source
2016	Girls und Panzer der Film	Mako Reizei		
2017	Beyond the Boundary: I'll Be Here	Ayaka Shindo		
2017	Tamako Love Story	Michiko Ōji		
2025	Batman Ninja vs. Yakuza League	Wonder Woman / Diana		

=== Television ===
Year	Title	Role	Notes	Source
2026	Special Ops: Lioness	Nurse	Season 3, Episode 8: "The Unraveling"	
