= Beyond the Boundary =

Japanese light novel series and its adaptations

- Cover of the first light novel volume featuring Mirai Kuriyama (left) and Akihito Kanbara (right)

境界の彼方 (Kyōkai no Kanata)
- Genre: Dark fantasy; Romance; Supernatural
- Light novel
- Written by: Nagomu Torii
- Illustrated by: Tomoyo Kamoi
- Published by: Kyoto Animation
- Imprint: KA Esuma Bunko
- Original run: June 9, 2012 – December 18, 2013
- Volumes: 3
- Anime television series
- Directed by: Taichi Ishidate
- Produced by: Gou Tanaka; Riri Senami; Shigeru Saitō; Shinichi Nakamura
- Written by: Jukki Hanada
- Music by: Hikaru Nanase
- Studio: Kyoto Animation
- Licensed by: AUS: Hanabee; NA: Sentai Filmworks (Note: Home video rights in North America via Section23 Films and streaming rights in English-speaking regions through Hidive.); UK: Animatsu Entertainment Manga Entertainment
- Original network: Tokyo MX, TVA, ABC, BS11, Animax
- English network: SEA: Animax Asia
- Original run: October 2, 2013 – December 18, 2013
- Episodes: 12
- Original net animation

Beyond the Boundary: Idol Trial!
- Directed by: Taichi Ishidate
- Written by: Jukki Hanada
- Studio: Kyoto Animation
- Licensed by: NA: Sentai Filmworks
- Released: November 18, 2013 – July 2, 2014
- Episodes: 5
- Original video animation

Daybreak
- Directed by: Taichi Ishidate
- Written by: Jukki Hanada
- Music by: Hikaru Nanase
- Studio: Kyoto Animation
- Licensed by: AUS: Hanabee; NA: Sentai Filmworks
- Released: July 2, 2014
- Runtime: 23 minutes
- Anime film
- Beyond the Boundary: I'll Be Here

Beyond the Boundary (Japanese: 境界の彼方, Hepburn: Kyōkai no Kanata) is a Japanese light novel series written by Nagomu Torii, with illustrations by Tomoyo Kamoi. The work won an honorable mention in the Kyoto Animation Award competition in 2011. Kyoto Animation has published three volumes since June 2012. Set in Kashihara, Nara, this story follows a young boy named Akihito Kanbara who is an immortal being and half a spirit. After Akihito saves a girl named Mirai Kuriyama from committing suicide, he learns that she is a spirit world warrior and their lives become intertwined.

An anime television series adaptation, produced by Kyoto Animation, aired in Japan between October and December 2013. An original video animation episode was released in July 2014. A two-part anime film premiered in March and April 2015.

== Plot ==
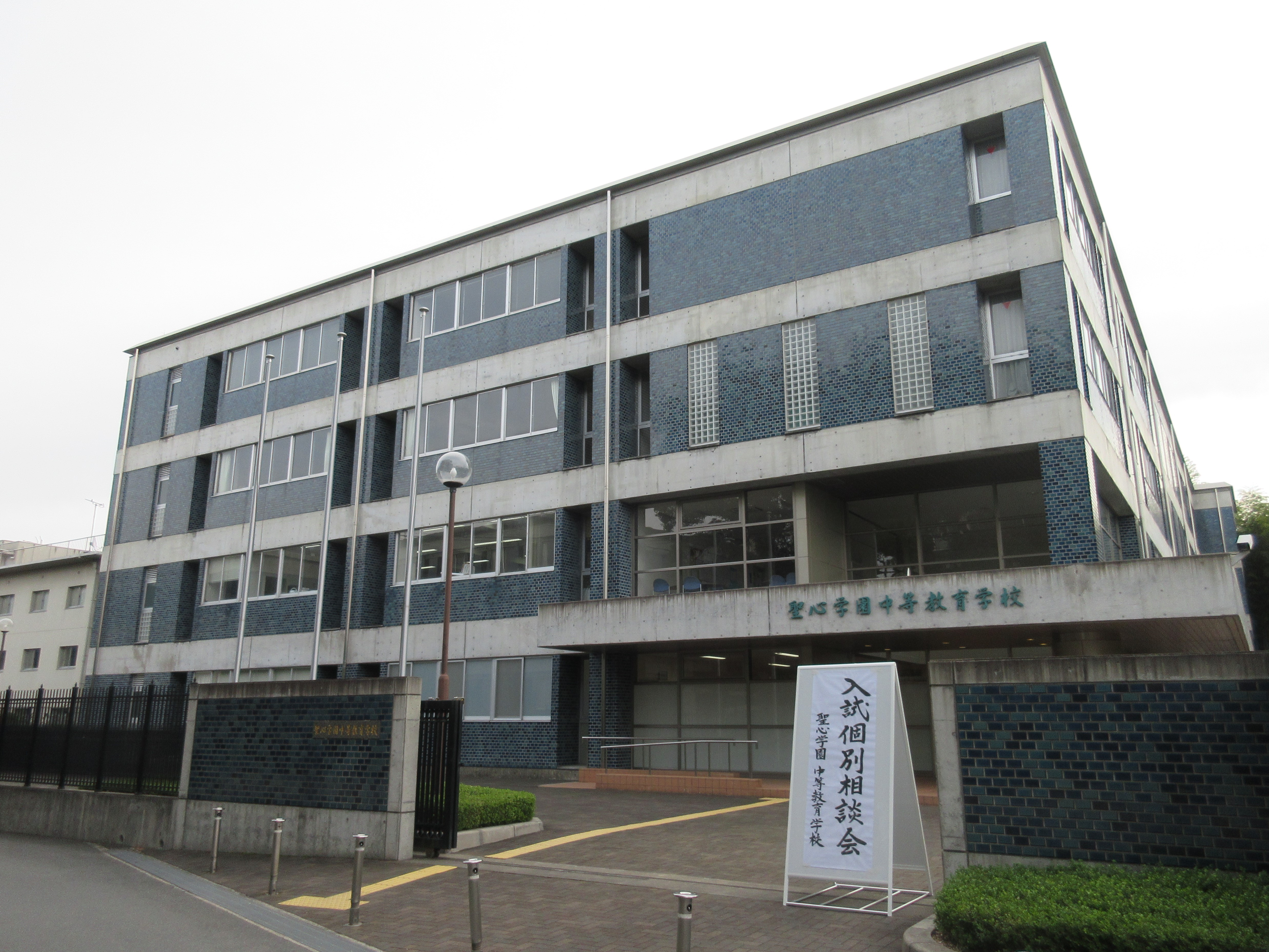
Seishin Gakuen Secondary School in Kashihara, Nara is where the series is set.

One day, high school student Akihito Kanbara instinctively goes to save his fellow schoolmate, Mirai Kuriyama, from committing suicide. Following his pleas, Mirai suddenly stabs Akihito with a sword formed out of her own blood and is shocked to discover that Akihito is an immortal "half-youmu"—the offspring of a supernatural creature, called a youmu, and a human. After learning that Mirai is a Spirit World Warrior (異界士, Ikaishi)—specialists who protect humans from being affected by youmu—and the last surviving member of her spirit hunting clan, their lives become intertwined as Akihito seeks to help Mirai gain the confidence to kill youmu so that she may stop attempting to kill him as practice.

Youmu (妖夢, yōmu; alt. Dreamshade) are supernatural creatures that appear throughout the series and can only be seen by those with a supernatural affinity. They are said to be the physical materialization of human animosity such as negative emotions including hatred, jealousy and malice and therefore as long as humans exist, youmu will continue to exist. They can exist in many types of shapes and forms with some even having a human appearance. There are also rare cases when a youmu and a human mate may produce an offspring, which is called Half-Youmu (半妖, Han-Yō; "Half-Shade"). Most youmu are relatively docile and coexist with humans without them even being aware of their presence. However, there are times when a youmu's behavior upsets the balance, so the Spirit World Warriors are sent in to kill them. Upon death, a youmu produces a Youmu Stone (妖夢石, Yōmu Ishi; alt. Dreamshade Stone) which can be appraised and traded, hence providing a source of income for a Spirit World Warrior.

== Characters ==
=== Main ===
Akihito Kanbara (神原 秋人, Kanbara Akihito)
Voiced by: Kenn, Mei Tanaka (young) (Japanese); Clint Bickham (English)
Akihito is a second-year high school student with short blonde hair who is an immortal half-youmu, the offspring of a youmu and a human. He has the ability to heal quickly from any wound albeit still experiencing pain. Due to this Mirai uses him as practice to help overcome her fear of killing youmus. He is a member of the Literary Club. He has an attraction to girls with glasses, as shown by his spontaneous compliments to Mirai, whom he develops romantic feelings for, as well as being disdainfully teased for it by Mitsuki. If Akihito's physical human body finds itself in a severe weakened state, his dormant youmu half emerges, physically changing his body into a hideous feral appearance which then proceeds to go on a rampage. Akihito's youmu half is extremely powerful, able to easily overwhelm supernatural cages and barriers that attempt to contain it in addition to having enough destructive force to physically devastate whatever landscape surrounds it. Akihito implies that because of his youmu half, the Nase clan are not exactly his friends but instead people who are tasked with watching him should his youmu-half ever go berserk and killing him if necessary. Following a youmu transformation, Akihito falls into a state of depression due to almost killing Hiroomi in a past rampage. Akihito's youmu half holds the greatest destructive power of all youmu and is referred to as "Beyond the Boundary".
Mirai Kuriyama (栗山 未来, Kuriyama Mirai)
Voiced by: Risa Taneda (Japanese); Krystal LaPorte (series), Kira Vincent-Davis (films; steelbook Blu-Ray) (English)
Mirai is a first-year high school student with short, light pink hair styled into a bob, and wears red-rimmed glasses, leading Akihito to call her a 'bespectacled beauty', much to her dismay. She has the ability to manipulate blood, which is unique even within the scope of the Spirit World. Overuse of her ability results in severe anemia while at the same time it causes her to feel isolated and seemingly attempts suicide by jumping off the roof of the high school until she is saved by Akihito. She is summoned to kill Akihito but ends up harboring feelings for him. She is often ridiculed due to her constantly posting about the misfortunes in her life on her blog and Twitter account. She usually uses the phrase, "How unpleasant" (「不愉快です」, "Fuyukai desu") to describe most situations, particularly at remarks made by Akihito. Despite her cursed blood lineage, she was adopted by the Inami clan and befriended their daughter, Yui Inami whom she killed out of fear after Yui was possessed by the Hollow Shadow—an act of which Mirai is deeply regretful and hence gave root to her fear of killing. Her signature weapon is a carmine colored sword formed out of her blood.
Mitsuki Nase (名瀬 美月, Nase Mitsuki)
Voiced by: Minori Chihara (Japanese); Monica Rial (English)
Mitsuki is a second-year high school student with silky, dark hair. She is the younger sister of Hiroomi and Izumi and the President of the Literary Club. She enjoys teasing Akihito, such as claiming to be his childhood friend (in actuality, Akihito first met her in junior high; the OVA revealing it was the same incident in which his youmu half nearly killed Hiroomi). Although she calls her brother Hiromi a "pervert" and calls him "aniki" (respected older brother) to sound less informal, she really adores him and holds him very dear to herself. Her clan governs Spirit World Warriors in their area. Izumi instilled in her the belief that Spirit World Warriors are to be alone all their life, due to their duties and therefore resulted in Mitsuki missing out on experiences with her peers while growing up. She has a rodent-like youmu called "Yakiimo" as a familiar. Like her brother, Mitsuki is capable of setting up cages.
Hiroomi Nase (名瀬 博臣, Nase Hiroomi)
Voiced by: Tatsuhisa Suzuki, Ayane Sakura (young) (Japanese); Adam Gibbs (English)
Hiroomi is a third-year high school student who is also Mitsuki's brother. He has black hair in a bowl-cut and wears a scarf at all times due to his supernatural powers that make him cold. He is also a member of the Literary Club. Hiroomi adores his sister Mitsuki and likes having her call him "Onii-chan", and also has a habit of teasing Akihito and affectionately calls him "Akkey". He is proficient in setting up cages or barriers that prevent youmu from entering a protected area. His supernatural abilities make him extremely sensitive to the cold which not only causes him to constantly wear a scarf and also warm his fingers in Akihito's armpits much to the latter's annoyance. His back is severely scarred due to having to restrain Akihito's youmu rampage in the past, which almost resulted in his death.

=== Spirit World Warriors ===
Shizuku Ninomiya (二ノ宮 雫, Ninomiya Shizuku)
Voiced by: Akeno Watanabe (Japanese); Amelia Fischer (English)
A rather skilled Spirit World Warrior. She is usually referred to as "Nino-san" and works as a teacher at Nagatsuki High School, in addition to Spirit Hunting. Despite her beauty, she always finds herself turned down by men.
Yayoi Kanbara (神原 弥生, Kanbara Yayoi)
Voiced by: Hiromi Konno (Japanese); Luci Christian (English)
Akihito's mother and a Spirit World Warrior. She is constantly traveling and sends Akihito a postcard to check up on him every so often. Akihito describes her as being a "free-spirited" avant-garde thinker in addition to possessing an eccentric personality and is thus ashamed of her childlike behavior. This is shown during Akihito's elementary school's Parents' Day when she sat at a student's desk while wearing a panda costume and participated in the class.
Izumi Nase (名瀬 泉, Nase Izumi)
Voiced by: Ayako Kawasumi (Japanese); Carli Mosier (English)
The eldest daughter of the Nase clan. She usually has a calm demeanor despite having a malicious undertone. She has the viewpoint that youmu are no different from crops or farm animals and exist solely to provide her clan with a livelihood. Like the rest of her clan, Izumi is proficient in setting up barriers. She possesses a type of freezing ability while her signature weapon is a dual-tipped spear. She has a past connection with Miroku and also harbors a youmu within her body—which she tries to keep from the rest of her clan.
Maya Minegishi (峰岸 舞耶, Minegishi Maya)
A silver-haired girl who was pursued during the Spirit World Warrior-slaying incidents. Her signature weapons include an automatic pistol and revolver. She also possesses the ability to suppress the power of an Interrogation Officer. She had an incident in the past with Miroku.
Yu Mashiro (真城 優斗, Mashiro Yu)
Mirai's childhood friend. He has a puppeteering ability.

=== Observation Department ===
Miroku Fujima (藤真 弥勒, Fujima Miroku)
Voiced by: Masaya Matsukaze (Japanese); Houston Hayes (English)
The main antagonist of the series and an interrogation officer from the Spirit World Warriors' Observation Department. He has the ability to instantly kill a youmu by simply focusing on it. He harbors a youmu within his own body, granting him special abilities.
Ukyo Kusunoki (楠木 右京, Kusunoki Ukyo)
An interrogation officer.
Kikyō Nagamizu (永水 桔梗, Nagamizu Kikyō)
An interrogation officer. She has the ability to manipulate the weight of objects.

=== Others ===
Ayaka Shindō (新堂 彩華, Shindō Ayaka)
Voiced by: Naomi Shindō (Japanese); Molly Searcy (English)
An appraiser of youmu. Her appraising business is camouflaged as a photo shop to normal humans. Her true form is that of a powerful multi-tailed fox-like youmu but usually takes the appearance of a human. She is also capable of setting up cages and barriers.
Ai Shindō (新堂 愛, Shindō Ai)
Voiced by: Yuri Yamaoka (Japanese); Brittney Karbowski (English)
An anime original character, Ai is Ayaka's 16-year-old sister who manages the appraising shop when Ayaka is unavailable. She is a cat-like youmu, with the ability to shape-shift into human form.
Yui Inami (伊波 唯, Inami Yui)
Voiced by: Sayuri Yahagi (Japanese); Sara Ornelas (English)
The deceased daughter of the Inami clan. She was the only one in her clan who treated Mirai with kindness but was ultimately killed by Mirai when she became possessed by the Hollow Shadow.
Sakura Inami (伊波 桜, Inami Sakura)
Voiced by: Moe Toyota (Japanese); Caitlynn French (English)
An anime original character, Sakura is the younger sister of Yui Inami. She hates Mirai for Yui's death and tries to kill the former as an act of revenge, but later realizes her true feelings for Mirai were clouded and forgives her. She has a tendency to be lazy at times. Sakura's spiritual powers are practically non-existent hence she fought using a spear courtesy of Miroku which absorbed the power of youmu stones.
Iori Ichinomiya (一ノ宮 庵, Ichinomiya Iori)
An information gatherer. He has the ability to directly link his mind to the Internet to obtain information.
Kana Shinozaki (篠崎 夏菜, Shinozaki Kana)
Sophomore at Nagatsuki High School. She wears a large ribbon on her head. Her signature phrase is "Hey!".

== Media ==
=== Light novels ===
Beyond the Boundary began as a light novel series written by Nagomu Torii, with illustrations provided by Tomoyo Kamoi. Torii entered the first novel in the series into the second Kyoto Animation Award contest in 2011, and it won an honorable mention in the novel category. The studio later published the first volume with their KA Esuma Bunko imprint on June 9, 2012, and three volumes have been released as of October 2, 2013.

No.	Release date	ISBN
1	June 9, 2012	978-4-9905812-4-4
2	April 8, 2013	978-4-907064-04-4
3	October 2, 2013	978-4-907064-07-5

=== Anime ===
An anime television series adaptation, produced by Kyoto Animation and directed by Taichi Ishidate, began airing on October 2, 2013. The opening theme is "Kyōkai no Kanata" (境界の彼方) by Minori Chihara and the ending theme is "Daisy" sung by Stereo Dive Foundation. The series was simulcasted on Crunchyroll until March 31, 2022. The anime has been licensed by Sentai Filmworks in North America for streaming and home video release on October 13, 2015. Three original net animation episodes of a short series titled Beyond the Boundary Idol Trial! (「きょうかいのかなた アイドル裁判!, Kyōkai no Kanata Aidoru Saiban!) were released between November 18 and December 16, 2013, on the official website via YouTube. Two additional Idol Trial episodes were released on DVD and Blu-ray Disc along with the first three and a full-length original video animation episode on July 2, 2014.

A two-part anime film titled Beyond the Boundary: I'll Be Here (劇場版 境界の彼方 -I'LL BE HERE-, Gekijōban Kyōkai no Kanata: I'll Be Here) was produced by Kyoto Animation and directed by Taichi Ishidate. The first film, Past (過去篇, Kako-hen), was released on March 14, 2015; its theme song is "Daisy" by Stereo Dive Foundation. The second film, Future (未来篇, Mirai-hen), was released on April 25, 2015; its theme song is "Aitakatta Sora" (会いたかった空, The Sky I Wanted To Meet) by Chihara. Past retells the events of the television series, while Future is an original story set one year after the end of the television series. Sentai Filmworks licensed the films in North America, and Animatsu Entertainment licensed the films in the UK.

Prior to Sentai Filmworks' licensing of the films in 2017 for release in North America, voice actress Krystal LaPorte—the original English dub actress of Mirai Kurayama—was unknowingly recast in all the roles she had previously dubbed for the company and blacklisted from working for them in the future. LaPorte later explained on Twitter how, without any prior knowledge, she was recast in all her previous roles with the company and when reaching out to the ADR manager, she was offered no explanation for her recasting. In 2017, when the films were released by Sentai Filmworks in North America, Mirai Kurayama had been dubbed by Kira Vincent-Davis. On August 18, 2020, the complete anime—the series, films, and OVA—was released on Blu-ray in a special steelbook collection. Although the previous 2015 Blu-ray release of the series had included LaPorte's dubbing, the steelbook collection included Vincent-Davis as Mirai Kurayama in the series as well as the films and OVA, having redubbed all of the character's lines.
