= Yuri Yamaoka =

Japanese voice actress

- 山岡 ゆり
- Born: July 7 Saitama Prefecture, Japan
- Occupation: Voice actress
- Years active: 2009–present
- Agent: Holy Peak
- Notable credit: Kyoukai no Kanata as Ai Shindō
- Height: 149 cm (4 ft 11 in)

Yuri Yamaoka (山岡 ゆり, Yamaoka Yuri; born July 7) is a Japanese voice actress. She is affiliated with Holy Peak.

== Personal life ==
Yuri Yamaoka was July 7, 2007, in Saitama Prefecture with Blood type O.

She started to the piano from the age of two or three. Upon becoming a junior high school student, she decided that she would join a music club. When she was choosing an instrument, she originally wanted to play the flute; however, when a really pretty senior who played the trumpet invited her to try the trumpet, and she reluctantly said yes.

On July 7, 2018, she shared on Twitter that she had married a man outside the entertainment industry.

== Filmography ==
Anime
Year	Title	Character	Ref.
	9-Nine: Ruler's Crown	Haruka Kōsaka	
	Aikatsu!	Arisa Umeda	
	Aikatsu Friends!	Suzuka Ise	
	Baku Tech! Bakugan	Tatsuma	
	Beyond the Boundary	Ai Shindō	
	Fairy Tail	Village Girl	
	Fantasista Doll	Miko Uno	
	Girls und Panzer	Yūki Utsugi	
	Gunma-chan	Yayoi-hime	
	Heybot!	Sky Rabbit	
	Love, Chunibyo & Other Delusions	Cento	
	Nora, Princess, and Stray Cat	Nobuchina Takada	
	Nura: Rise of the Yokai Clan	Errand Rat Yōkai	
	Shirobako	Erika Yano, Hiroko Tokiwa, Tatiana Yakovlef	
	Sound! Euphonium	Yūko Yoshikawa	
	Tamako Market	Choi Mochimazzui	
	Umineko When They Cry	Beelzebub	
	Yumeiro Patissiere	Chocolat, Sayuri Kanda	
	Yashahime: Princess Half-Demon	Aiya	

Original video animation
Year	Title	Character	Ref.
	Shirobako	Tatiana Yakovlef	

=== Anime films ===
- Girls und Panzer das Finale: Part 1 – Yūki Utsugi
- Girls und Panzer das Finale: Part 2 – Yūki Utsugi
- Girls und Panzer das Finale: Part 3 – Yūki Utsugi
- Girls und Panzer der Film – Yūki Utsugi
- Love, Chunibyo & Other Delusions! Take on Me – Cento
- Shirobako: The Movie – Erika Yano

=== Video games ===
- Alice Gear Aegis – Kanade Nikitō
- Another Eden – Renri
- Arcana Heart 3: LOVE MAX SIX STARS!!!!! – Minori Amanohara
- Arknights – Conviction
- Azur Lane – Admiral Hipper, Foxhound, Achilles
- Granblue Fantasy – Manamel
- Exos Heroes – Magi
- Tokyo 7th Sisters – Manon Hoshigaki
- Umineko no Naku Koro ni: Majo to Suiri no Rondo – Beelzebub
- Umineko no Naku Koro ni: Shinjitsu to Gensō no Yasōkyoku – Beelzebub
- Xenoblade Chronicles 2 – Obrona (Kamui)
- Touhou Lost Word – Remilia Scarlet (Tiny Devil Mistress)
